= Handball at the 2014 Central American and Caribbean Games =

- Venue: Centro Deportivo Carlos Serdán Arechavaleta
- Location: Veracruz, Mexico
- Dates: 15-26 November

The handball competition at the 2014 Central American and Caribbean Games will be held in Veracruz, Mexico from 15 to 26 November 2014 at the Centro Deportivo Carlos Serdán Arechavaleta.

== Qualification ==
Qualification	Date	Host	Places	Men	Women
Host	–	–	1	Mexico	Mexico
2013 Central American Games	4–8 March 2013	Costa Rica, San José	3	Nicaragua; Guatemala; Costa Rica	Costa Rica; Guatemala; Nicaragua
2013 Caribbean Cup	5–9 November 2013	Dominican Republic, Santo Domingo	4	Dominican Republic; Cuba; Puerto Rico; Colombia	Cuba; Dominican Republic; Puerto Rico; Colombia

== Medal summary ==
Event	Gold	Silver	Bronze
Men’s tournament	Puerto Rico (PUR); Pascual Pacheco; Alberto Pizarro; Jose Sanchez; Hector Santana; Angel Benitez; Jorge Nazario; Jose Ceballos; Hector Hiraldo; Jesus Arroyo; Steven Rodriguez; Emmanuelly Fernandez; Julio Baez; Joshua Mercado; Edwin Brito; Juan Ramos	Dominican Republic (DOM); Erick Montero; Leony de Leon; Erinson Tavarez; Pablo Jacobo; Anthony Manzanillo; Luis Objio; Franalbert Aybar; Geraldo Diaz; Elvin Fis; Luis Sanlate; Domingo Caraballo; Jose Sanchez; Dioris Mateo; Willibert de la Rosa	Cuba (CUB); Alejandro Romero; Pedro Veitia; Omar Toledano; Adonys Garcia; Angel Rivero; Pavel Caballero; Yoan Balazquez; Reinier Taboada; Yanquiel Cruzata; Yacel Lazo; Reyniel Justa; Angel Hernandez; Odanis Perez; Alain Vizcay; Noelbis Robles
Women’s tournament	Cuba (CUB); Marines Rojas; Maricet Fernandez; Ayling Martinez; Livia Veranes; Raiza Beltran; Aida Despaigne; Lizandra Lusson; Gleinys Reyes; Yunisleidy Camejo; Maria Aldama Miranda; Ismari Barrios; Naddezza Valera; Eneleidis Guevara; Lisandra Espinosa; Yenma Ramirez	Puerto Rico (PUR); Adriana Cabrera; Nathalys Ceballos; Sheila Hiraldo; Joane Vergara; Natalie Cabello; Kitsa Escobar; Fabiola Martínez; Roxanaly Carrasquillo; Jackeline Gonzalez; Nicolette Pope; Jailene Maldonado; Zugeily Soto; Lillianushka Natal; Ciris García; Zuleyka Fuentes	Mexico (MEX); Itzel Aguirre; Brenda Ramirez; Tania Navarro; Guadalupe Saavedra; Selene Sifuentes; Fernanda Rivera; Denisse Romo; Berenice Esquivel; Laura Morales; Marlene Sosa; Elsa Felix; Nashely Jaramillo; Maria de Lourdes Rocha; Manuela Zavala; Belen Aguirre

== Women's tournament ==
=== Group A ===
Team	Pld	W	D	L	GF	GA	GD	Pts
Cuba	3	3	0	0	144	35	+109	6
Dominican Republic	3	2	0	1	95	71	+24	4
Costa Rica	3	1	0	2	46	107	−61	2
Nicaragua	3	0	0	3	45	117	−72	0

15 November 2014; 13:00	Dominican Republic	45 – 15	Nicaragua	Carlos Cerdan Complex; Referees: Díaz, Zapata (COL)
15 November 2014; 13:00	Peña 10	(28–7)	Rivera 5	Carlos Cerdan Complex; Referees: Díaz, Zapata (COL)
15 November 2014; 13:00	3× (yellow card) 4× (suspension)		2× (yellow card) 2× (suspension)	Carlos Cerdan Complex; Referees: Díaz, Zapata (COL)

15 November 2014; 15:00	Costa Rica	7 – 55	Cuba	Carlos Cerdan Complex; Referees: Camacho, Ortíz (MEX)
15 November 2014; 15:00	Arce, Cordero 2	(4–27)	Reyes 11	Carlos Cerdan Complex; Referees: Camacho, Ortíz (MEX)
15 November 2014; 15:00	3× (yellow card) 9× (suspension) 1× (red card)		3× (yellow card) 2× (suspension)	Carlos Cerdan Complex; Referees: Camacho, Ortíz (MEX)

16 November 2014; 13:00	Nicaragua	21 – 22	Costa Rica	Carlos Cerdan Complex; Referees: Duran, Rodríguez (MEX)
16 November 2014; 13:00	Acuña, Cárdenas 5	(9–8)	Blanco 5	Carlos Cerdan Complex; Referees: Duran, Rodríguez (MEX)
16 November 2014; 13:00	3× (yellow card) 4× (suspension)		3× (yellow card) 7× (suspension)	Carlos Cerdan Complex; Referees: Duran, Rodríguez (MEX)

16 November 2014; 15:00	Cuba	39 – 19	Dominican Republic	Carlos Cerdan Complex; Referees: Pinto, Menezes (BRA)
16 November 2014; 15:00	Martínez 9	(19–7)	Hernández 6	Carlos Cerdan Complex; Referees: Pinto, Menezes (BRA)
16 November 2014; 15:00	2× (yellow card) 3× (suspension)		3× (yellow card) 5× (suspension)	Carlos Cerdan Complex; Referees: Pinto, Menezes (BRA)

17 November 2014; 13:00	Dominican Republic	31 – 17	Costa Rica	Carlos Cerdan Complex; Referees: Hernández, Montiel (NCA)
17 November 2014; 13:00	Brito 8	(14–6)	Camacho 6	Carlos Cerdan Complex; Referees: Hernández, Montiel (NCA)
17 November 2014; 13:00	2× (yellow card) 5× (suspension)		3× (yellow card) 6× (suspension)	Carlos Cerdan Complex; Referees: Hernández, Montiel (NCA)

17 November 2014; 15:00	Nicaragua	9 – 50	Cuba	Carlos Cerdan Complex; Referees: Díaz, Zapata (COL)
17 November 2014; 15:00	Rivera 5	(4–25)	Reyes 9	Carlos Cerdan Complex; Referees: Díaz, Zapata (COL)
17 November 2014; 15:00	3× (yellow card)		3× (yellow card) 3× (suspension)	Carlos Cerdan Complex; Referees: Díaz, Zapata (COL)

=== Group B ===
Team	Pld	W	D	L	GF	GA	GD	Pts
Puerto Rico	3	3	0	0	86	54	+32	6
Mexico	3	2	0	1	93	56	+37	4
Guatemala	3	1	0	2	53	79	−26	2
Colombia	3	0	0	3	47	90	−43	0

15 November 2014; 18:00	Puerto Rico	27 – 17	Guatemala	Carlos Cerdan Complex; Referees: Zúñiga, Aldea (CUB)
15 November 2014; 18:00	Ceballos 7	(12–6)	Lavarreda 5	Carlos Cerdan Complex; Referees: Zúñiga, Aldea (CUB)
15 November 2014; 18:00	4× (yellow card) 3× (suspension)		2× (yellow card) 1× (suspension)	Carlos Cerdan Complex; Referees: Zúñiga, Aldea (CUB)

15 November 2014; 20:00	Mexico	35 – 16	Colombia	Carlos Cerdan Complex; Referees: Hernández, Montiel (NCA)
15 November 2014; 20:00	Ramírez, Saavedra, Rivera 5	(23–5)	Estrada 5	Carlos Cerdan Complex; Referees: Hernández, Montiel (NCA)
15 November 2014; 20:00	1× (yellow card) 8× (suspension)		3× (yellow card) 6× (suspension) 1× (red card)	Carlos Cerdan Complex; Referees: Hernández, Montiel (NCA)

16 November 2014; 18:00	Colombia	14 – 32	Puerto Rico	Carlos Cerdan Complex; Referees: Camacho, Ortiz (MEX)
16 November 2014; 18:00	Perez 4	(3–16)	Ceballos, Vergara, Martínez 4	Carlos Cerdan Complex; Referees: Camacho, Ortiz (MEX)
16 November 2014; 18:00	3× (yellow card) 4× (suspension) 1× (red card)		3× (yellow card) 3× (suspension)	Carlos Cerdan Complex; Referees: Camacho, Ortiz (MEX)

16 November 2014; 20:00	Guatemala	13 – 35	Mexico	Carlos Cerdan Complex; Referees: Perez, Guzman (PUR)
16 November 2014; 20:00	McGauran 3	(8–15)	Ramirez, Saavedra 7	Carlos Cerdan Complex; Referees: Perez, Guzman (PUR)
16 November 2014; 20:00	3× (yellow card) 11× (suspension) 1× (red card)		2× (yellow card) 2× (suspension)	Carlos Cerdan Complex; Referees: Perez, Guzman (PUR)

17 November 2014; 18:00	Guatemala	23 – 17	Colombia	Carlos Cerdan Complex; Referees: Reyes, Zúñiga (CUB)
17 November 2014; 18:00	Lopez 8	(9–8)	Orjuela, Alvarez, Estrada 3	Carlos Cerdan Complex; Referees: Reyes, Zúñiga (CUB)
17 November 2014; 18:00	3× (yellow card) 4× (suspension)		3× (yellow card) 7× (suspension)	Carlos Cerdan Complex; Referees: Reyes, Zúñiga (CUB)

17 November 2014; 20:00	Puerto Rico	27 – 23	Mexico	Carlos Cerdan Complex; Referees: Pinto, Menezes (BRA)
17 November 2014; 20:00	Cabrera, Vergara, García 5	(12–13)	Ramirez 8	Carlos Cerdan Complex; Referees: Pinto, Menezes (BRA)
17 November 2014; 20:00	3× (yellow card) 6× (suspension)		3× (yellow card) 4× (suspension)	Carlos Cerdan Complex; Referees: Pinto, Menezes (BRA)

== Knockout stage ==
Semi-finals
November 19
Cuba	28
Mexico	27
November 19
Dominican Republic	21
Puerto Rico	22

Final
November 20
Cuba	32
Puerto Rico	18
Third place
November 20
Mexico	24
Dominican Republic	20

=== 5th–8th place playoffs ===
Semifinals
November 19
Costa Rica	16
Colombia	26
November 19
Nicaragua	24
Guatemala	23

Fifth place
November 20
Colombia	33
Nicaragua	23
Seventh place
November 20
Costa Rica	21
Guatemala	20

==== 5th 8th place playoffs ====
19 November 2014; 10:00	Costa Rica	16 – 26	Colombia	Carlos Cerdan Complex; Referees: Duran, Rodriguez (MEX)
19 November 2014; 10:00	Urena, Camacho 4	(8–11)	Mazo, Rodriguez 6	Carlos Cerdan Complex; Referees: Duran, Rodriguez (MEX)
19 November 2014; 10:00	3× (yellow card) 8× (suspension)		3× (yellow card) 6× (suspension)	Carlos Cerdan Complex; Referees: Duran, Rodriguez (MEX)

19 November 2014; 17:00	Nicaragua	24 – 23	Guatemala	Carlos Cerdan Complex; Referees: Diaz, Zapata (COL)
19 November 2014; 17:00	Acuna 8	(10–11)	Lavarreda 7	Carlos Cerdan Complex; Referees: Diaz, Zapata (COL)
19 November 2014; 17:00	2× (yellow card) 2× (suspension)		3× (yellow card) 3× (suspension)	Carlos Cerdan Complex; Referees: Diaz, Zapata (COL)

==== Semifinals ====
19 November 2014; 12:30	Cuba	28 – 27	Mexico	Carlos Cerdan Complex; Referees: Perez, Guzman (PUR)
19 November 2014; 12:30	Martinez, Espinosa 6	(12–13)	Ramirez, Jaramillo 6	Carlos Cerdan Complex; Referees: Perez, Guzman (PUR)
19 November 2014; 12:30	4× (yellow card) 6× (suspension)		3× (yellow card) 5× (suspension)	Carlos Cerdan Complex; Referees: Perez, Guzman (PUR)

19 November 2014; 20:00	Dominican Republic	21 – 22	Puerto Rico	Carlos Cerdan Complex; Referees: Reyes, Zuniga (CUB)
19 November 2014; 20:00	Hernández 5	(8–8)	Ceballos 6	Carlos Cerdan Complex; Referees: Reyes, Zuniga (CUB)
19 November 2014; 20:00	2× (yellow card) 2× (suspension)		3× (yellow card) 4× (suspension)	Carlos Cerdan Complex; Referees: Reyes, Zuniga (CUB)

==== 7th-place match ====
20 November 2014; 10:00	Costa Rica	21 – 20	Guatemala	Carlos Cerdan Complex; Referees: Hernandez, Montiel (NCA)
20 November 2014; 10:00	Camacho 6	(6–10)	Lavarreda 6	Carlos Cerdan Complex; Referees: Hernandez, Montiel (NCA)
20 November 2014; 10:00	3× (yellow card) 3× (suspension)		3× (yellow card) 4× (suspension)	Carlos Cerdan Complex; Referees: Hernandez, Montiel (NCA)

==== 5th-place match ====
20 November 2014; 12:30	Colombia	33 – 23	Nicaragua	Carlos Cerdan Complex; Referees: Camacho, Ortiz (MEX)
20 November 2014; 12:30	Alvarez 6	(13–9)	Cardenas 8	Carlos Cerdan Complex; Referees: Camacho, Ortiz (MEX)
20 November 2014; 12:30	3× (yellow card) 5× (suspension)		2× (yellow card) 5× (suspension)	Carlos Cerdan Complex; Referees: Camacho, Ortiz (MEX)

==== Bronze medal match ====
20 November 2014; 17:30	Mexico	24 – 15	Dominican Republic	Carlos Cerdan Complex; Referees: Pinto, Menezes (BRA)
20 November 2014; 17:30	Ramirez, Sifuentes 4	(12–7)	Brito, Pimentel 3	Carlos Cerdan Complex; Referees: Pinto, Menezes (BRA)
20 November 2014; 17:30	3× (yellow card) 5× (suspension)		3× (yellow card) 5× (suspension)	Carlos Cerdan Complex; Referees: Pinto, Menezes (BRA)

==== Gold medal match ====
20 November 2014; 20:00	Cuba	32 – 18	Puerto Rico	Carlos Cerdan Complex; Referees: Diaz, Zapata (COL)
20 November 2014; 20:00	Reyes 8	(18–7)	Ceballos 8	Carlos Cerdan Complex; Referees: Diaz, Zapata (COL)
20 November 2014; 20:00	3× (yellow card) 3× (suspension)		3× (yellow card) 4× (suspension)	Carlos Cerdan Complex; Referees: Diaz, Zapata (COL)

== Final standing ==
Rank	Team
Gold medal	Cuba
Silver medal	Puerto Rico
Bronze medal	Mexico
4	Dominican Republic
5	Colombia
6	Nicaragua
7	Costa Rica
8	Guatemala

Team qualified to the 2015 Pan American Games

== Men's tournament ==
=== Group A ===
Team	Pld	W	D	L	GF	GA	GD	Pts
Dominican Republic	3	3	0	0	78	55	+23	6
Puerto Rico	3	2	0	1	90	65	+25	4
Colombia	3	1	0	2	63	72	−9	2
Costa Rica	3	0	0	3	46	85	−39	0

=== Group B ===
Team	Pld	W	D	L	GF	GA	GD	Pts
Cuba	3	3	0	0	110	66	+44	6
Mexico	3	2	0	1	104	66	+38	4
Guatemala	3	1	0	2	86	84	+2	2
Nicaragua	3	0	0	3	60	154	−94	0

== Knockout stage ==
Semi-finals
November 19
Dominican Republic	28
Mexico	23
November 19
Cuba	30
Puerto Rico	31

Final
November 20
Dominican Republic	27
Puerto Rico	37
Third place
November 20
Mexico	22
Cuba	32

=== 5th–8th place playoffs ===
Semifinals
November 19
Colombia	37
Nicaragua	28
November 19
Guatemala	26
Costa Rica	24

Fifth place
November 20
Colombia	26
Guatemala	25
Seventh place
November 20
Nicaragua	24
Costa Rica	23

== Final standing ==
Rank	Team
Gold medal	Puerto Rico
Silver medal	Dominican Republic
Bronze medal	Cuba
4	Mexico
5	Colombia
6	Guatemala
7	Nicaragua
8	Costa Rica

Team qualified to the 2015 Pan American Games

== Medal table ==
* Host nation (Mexico)

Rank	Nation	Gold	Silver	Bronze	Total
1	Puerto Rico (PUR)	1	1	0	2
2	Cuba (CUB)	1	0	1	2
3	Dominican Republic (DOM)	0	1	0	1
4	Mexico (MEX)*	0	0	1	1
Totals (4 entries)		2	2	2	6
