= Lisandra Espinosa =

Cuban handball player (born 1986)

Personal information
- Full name: Lisandra Espinosa Zamora
- Nationality: Cuban
- Born: September 29, 1986 (age 40)
- Height: 165 cm (65 in)

Sport
- Sport: Handball

Senior clubs
- Years: Team
- –: Matanzas
National team
- Years: Team
- –: Cuba
Medal record
Pan American Championship
Silver medal – second place	2015 Cuba	Team
Nor.Ca. Championship
Gold medal – first place	2015 Puerto Rico	Team

Lisandra Espinosa Zamora (born 29 September 1986) is a Cuban team handball player. She has played on the Cuban national team, and participated at the 2011 World Women's Handball Championship in Brazil.
