= Raiza Beltran =

Cuban handball player (born 1994)

Personal information
- Nationality: Cuban
- Born: 26 August 1994 (age 32)
- Height: 1.80 m (5 ft 11 in)

Sport
- Sport: Handball
- Position: Left back
- Current club: Guantánamo
National team
Years	Team	Apps	(Gls)
–	Cuba	39	(30)
Medal record
Pan American Championship
Silver medal – second place	2015 Cuba
Nor.Ca. Championship
Gold medal – first place	2015 Puerto Rico

Raiza Beltran (born 26 August 1994) is a Cuban handball player. She plays for the club Guantánamo and is member of the Cuban national team. She competed at the 2015 World Women's Handball Championship in Denmark.
