= Eneleidis Guevara =

Cuban handball player (born 1986)

Personal information
- Nationality: Cuban
- Born: 4 August 1986 (age 40)
- Height: 1.79 m (5 ft 10 in)

Sport
- Sport: Handball
- Position: Goalkeeper
- Current club: Matanzas
National team
Years	Team	Apps	(Gls)
–	Cuba	61	(0)
Medal record
Pan American Championship
Silver medal – second place	2015 Cuba
Nor.Ca. Championship
Gold medal – first place	2015 Puerto Rico

Eneleidis Guevara Llovera (born 4 August 1986) is a Cuban handball player. She plays on the Cuban national team, and participated at the 2011 World Women's Handball Championship in Brazil.
