= Handball at the 2015 Pan American Games – Women's tournament =

Handball – Women's tournament at the 2015 Pan American Games
- Venue: Exhibition Centre – Hall B
- Dates: July 16 – July 24
- Competitors: 120 from 8 nations

Medalists
| Gold medal | Brazil |
| Silver medal | Argentina |
| Bronze medal | Uruguay |

The women's handball tournament at the 2015 Pan American Games in Toronto, Canada was held at the Exhibition Centre (in Hall B) from July 16 to 24.

For these Games, the women competed in an 8-team tournament. The teams were grouped into two pools of four teams each for a round-robin preliminary round. The top two teams in each group advanced to a single elimination bracket.

Brazil were the defending champions from the 2011 Pan American Games in Guadalajara, defeating Argentina, 33–15 in the final.

The winner of the tournament were to qualify for the 2016 Summer Olympics in Rio de Janeiro, Brazil, while the 2nd and the 3rd place (due to the continental rankings at the World Championship) qualified for the Olympic Qualification Tournament. As the host nation Brazil won, the runner up qualified instead, in accordance with the regulations.

== Qualification ==
A total of eight women's teams qualified to compete at the games. The top three teams at the South American and Central American and Caribbean Games qualified, along with the host nation Canada. The United States and Uruguay competed against one another in a home/away playoff for the last spot in the tournament. The fourth placed team in the Central American and Caribbean Games both declined to compete in the respective tournaments.

=== Summary ===
| Event | Date | Location | Vacancies | Qualified |
|---|---|---|---|---|
| Host Nation | —N/a | —N/a | 1 | Canada |
| 2014 South American Games | March 7–15 | (Chile) Santiago | 3 | Brazil; Argentina; Chile |
| 2014 Central American and Caribbean Games | November 15–23 | (Mexico) Veracruz | 3 | Cuba; Puerto Rico; Mexico |
| Last chance qualification tournament | March 7/14, 2015 | (United States) Auburn (Uruguay) Montevideo | 1 | Uruguay |
| Total | | | 8 | |

=== Last chance qualification tournament ===
| March 07 | United States | 25 – 30 | Uruguay | Beard–Eaves–Memorial Coliseum, Auburn; Attendance: 900; Referees: Perez, Guzman (PUR) |
| March 07 | Gascon, Darling 7 | (16–15) | Scarrone 8 | Beard–Eaves–Memorial Coliseum, Auburn; Attendance: 900; Referees: Perez, Guzman (PUR) |
| March 07 | 3× (yellow card) 7× (suspension) 1× (red card) | Report | 2× (yellow card) 3× (suspension) | Beard–Eaves–Memorial Coliseum, Auburn; Attendance: 900; Referees: Perez, Guzman (PUR) |

| March 14 | Uruguay | 24 – 22 | United States | Polideportivo, Montevideo; Attendance: 1200; Referees: Minore, Marina (ARG) |
| March 14 | Barreiro 5 | (13–8) | Darling 7 | Polideportivo, Montevideo; Attendance: 1200; Referees: Minore, Marina (ARG) |
| March 14 | 3× (yellow card) 5× (suspension) | Report | 3× (yellow card) 7× (suspension) 1× (red card) | Polideportivo, Montevideo; Attendance: 1200; Referees: Minore, Marina (ARG) |

== Rosters ==
At the start of tournament, all eight participating countries had up to 15 players on their rosters.

- Argentina
- Brazil
- Canada
- Chile
- Cuba
- Mexico
- Puerto Rico
- Uruguay

== Draw ==
The draw for the competition took place on March 15, 2015 in Montevideo, Uruguay.

| Pot 1 | Pot 2 | Pot 3 | Pot 4 |
|---|---|---|---|
| Brazil; Argentina | Chile; Mexico | Puerto Rico; Uruguay | Canada; Cuba |

== Results ==
The official detailed schedule was revealed on April 26, 2015.

All times are Eastern Daylight Time (UTC−4)

=== Preliminary round ===
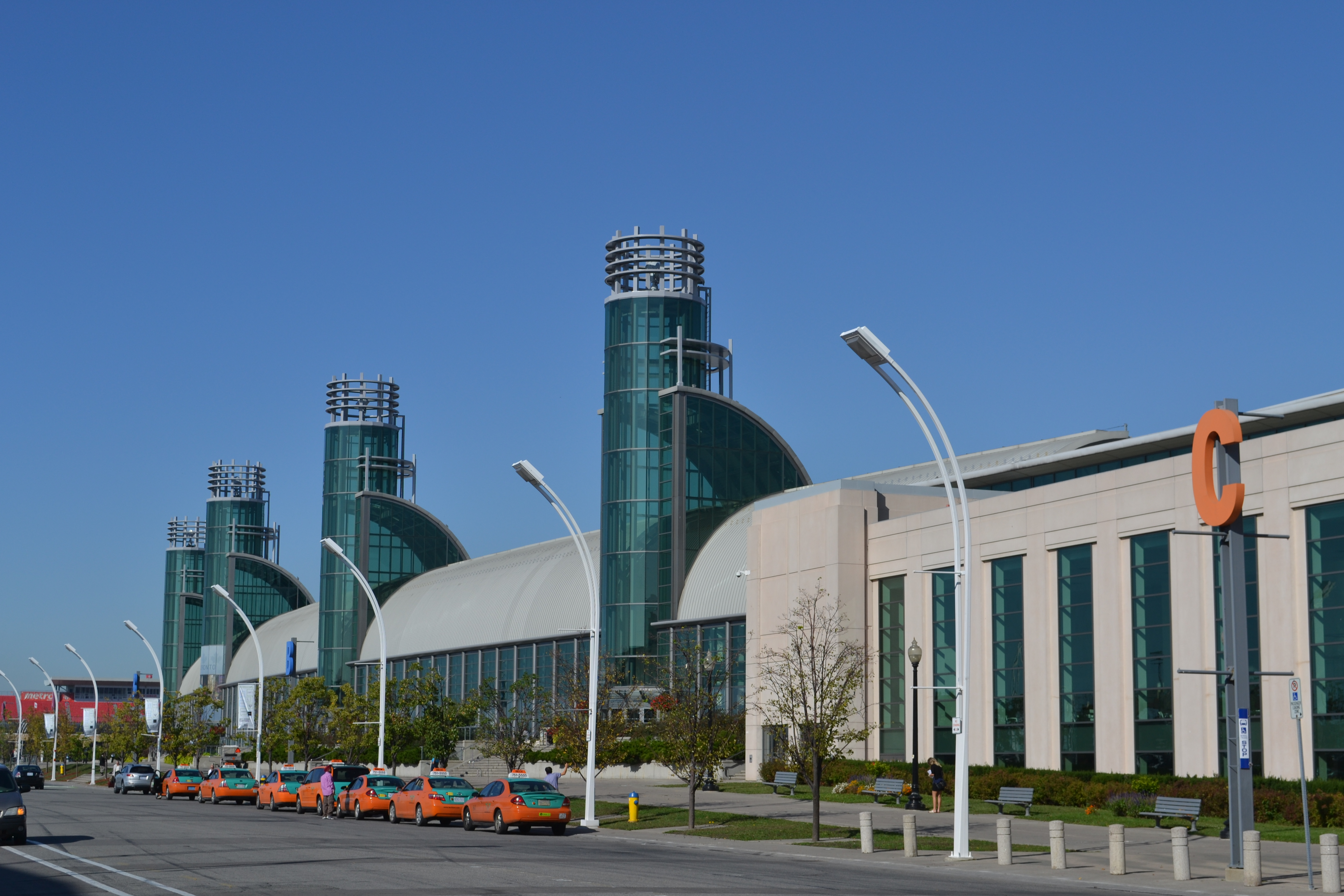
The Direct Energy Centre (Exhibition Centre), was the venue for the women's handball competition

==== Group A ====
| Team | Pld | W | D | L | GF | GA | GD | Pts | Qualification |
|---|---|---|---|---|---|---|---|---|---|
| Brazil | 3 | 3 | 0 | 0 | 120 | 52 | +68 | 6 | Qualified for the Semifinals |
| Mexico | 3 | 2 | 0 | 1 | 83 | 86 | −3 | 4 | Qualified for the Semifinals |
| Puerto Rico | 3 | 0 | 1 | 2 | 72 | 98 | −26 | 1 | |
| Canada | 3 | 0 | 1 | 2 | 55 | 94 | −39 | 1 | |

| July 16; 11:30 | Brazil | 38–21 | Puerto Rico | Exhibition Centre – Hall B Referees: Paolantoni, Zanikian (ARG) |
| July 16; 11:30 | Nascimento, Silva 7 | (15–10) | Ceballos 7 | Exhibition Centre – Hall B Referees: Paolantoni, Zanikian (ARG) |
| July 16; 11:30 | 3× (yellow card) 2× (suspension) | Report | 2× (yellow card) 5× (suspension) | Exhibition Centre – Hall B Referees: Paolantoni, Zanikian (ARG) |

| July 16; 13:30 | Mexico | 25–22 | Canada | Exhibition Centre – Hall B Referees: Lemes, Sosa (URU) |
| July 16; 13:30 | Aguirre, Saavedra 4 | (14–10) | Lochet 5 | Exhibition Centre – Hall B Referees: Lemes, Sosa (URU) |
| July 16; 13:30 | 3× (yellow card) 4× (suspension) | Report | 2× (yellow card) 4× (suspension) | Exhibition Centre – Hall B Referees: Lemes, Sosa (URU) |

| July 18; 11:30 | Canada | 12–48 | Brazil | Exhibition Centre – Hall B Referees: Zuñiga, Reyes (CUB) |
| July 18; 11:30 | Routhier 6 | (5–26) | Nascimento 9 | Exhibition Centre – Hall B Referees: Zuñiga, Reyes (CUB) |
| July 18; 11:30 | 2× (yellow card) 2× (suspension) | Report | 2× (yellow card) 3× (suspension) | Exhibition Centre – Hall B Referees: Zuñiga, Reyes (CUB) |

| July 18; 13:30 | Puerto Rico | 30–39 | Mexico | Exhibition Centre – Hall B Referees: Minore, Marina (ARG) |
| July 18; 13:30 | Cabrera, Ceballos 6 | (17–14) | Rocha 6 | Exhibition Centre – Hall B Referees: Minore, Marina (ARG) |
| July 18; 13:30 | 3× (yellow card) 9× (suspension) 1× (red card) | Report | 3× (yellow card) 3× (suspension) | Exhibition Centre – Hall B Referees: Minore, Marina (ARG) |

| July 20; 11:30 | Puerto Rico | 21–21 | Canada | Exhibition Centre – Hall B Referees: Paolantoni, Zanikian (ARG) |
| July 20; 11:30 | Ceballos 7 | (10–7) | Perry 7 | Exhibition Centre – Hall B Referees: Paolantoni, Zanikian (ARG) |
| July 20; 11:30 | 2× (yellow card) 3× (suspension) | report | 2× (yellow card) 5× (suspension) | Exhibition Centre – Hall B Referees: Paolantoni, Zanikian (ARG) |

| July 20; 13:30 | Brazil | 34–19 | Mexico | Exhibition Centre – Hall B Referees: Lemes, Sosa (URU) |
| July 20; 13:30 | Nascimento 8 | (19–12) | Jaramillo 3 | Exhibition Centre – Hall B Referees: Lemes, Sosa (URU) |
| July 20; 13:30 | 3× (yellow card) 1× (suspension) | Report | 3× (yellow card) 1× (suspension) | Exhibition Centre – Hall B Referees: Lemes, Sosa (URU) |

==== Group B ====
| Team | Pld | W | D | L | GF | GA | GD | Pts | Qualification |
|---|---|---|---|---|---|---|---|---|---|
| Argentina | 3 | 2 | 0 | 1 | 75 | 60 | +15 | 4 | Qualified for the Semifinals |
| Uruguay | 3 | 2 | 0 | 1 | 80 | 74 | +6 | 4 | Qualified for the Semifinals |
| Cuba | 3 | 2 | 0 | 1 | 83 | 83 | 0 | 4 | |
| Chile | 3 | 0 | 0 | 3 | 69 | 90 | −21 | 0 | |

| July 16; 18:30 | Argentina | 20–15 | Uruguay | Exhibition Centre – Hall B Referees: Pinto, Menezes (BRA) |
| July 16; 18:30 | Mendoza 6 | (13–7) | Barreiro 9 | Exhibition Centre – Hall B Referees: Pinto, Menezes (BRA) |
| July 16; 18:30 | 3× (yellow card) 2× (suspension) | report | 3× (yellow card) 5× (suspension) | Exhibition Centre – Hall B Referees: Pinto, Menezes (BRA) |

| July 16; 20:30 | Chile | 25–28 | Cuba | Exhibition Centre – Hall B Referees: Guzman, Perez (PUR) |
| July 16; 20:30 | Feuchtmann, Torres 5 | (11–14) | Lusson 10 | Exhibition Centre – Hall B Referees: Guzman, Perez (PUR) |
| July 16; 20:30 | 2× (yellow card) 5× (suspension) | report | 1× (yellow card) 7× (suspension) 1× (red card) | Exhibition Centre – Hall B Referees: Guzman, Perez (PUR) |

| July 18; 18:30 | Cuba | 27–25 | Argentina | Exhibition Centre – Hall B Referees: Martin Gjeding, Mads Hansen (DEN) |
| July 18; 18:30 | Lusson 14 | (14–13) | Mendoza 9 | Exhibition Centre – Hall B Referees: Martin Gjeding, Mads Hansen (DEN) |
| July 18; 18:30 | 1× (yellow card) 8× (suspension) | Report | 3× (yellow card) 2× (suspension) | Exhibition Centre – Hall B Referees: Martin Gjeding, Mads Hansen (DEN) |

| July 18; 20:30 | Uruguay | 32–26 | Chile | Exhibition Centre – Hall B Referees: Ines Paolantoni, Florencia Zanikian (ARG) |
| July 18; 20:30 | three players 5 | (15–10) | Flores 5 | Exhibition Centre – Hall B Referees: Ines Paolantoni, Florencia Zanikian (ARG) |
| July 18; 20:30 | 3× (yellow card) 4× (suspension) | Report | 2× (yellow card) 7× (suspension) | Exhibition Centre – Hall B Referees: Ines Paolantoni, Florencia Zanikian (ARG) |

| July 20; 18:30 | Uruguay | 33–28 | Cuba | Exhibition Centre – Hall B Referees: Minore, Marina (ARG) |
| July 20; 18:30 | Barreiro 10 | (13–12) | Lusson 9 | Exhibition Centre – Hall B Referees: Minore, Marina (ARG) |
| July 20; 18:30 | 4× (yellow card) 4× (suspension) | report | 2× (yellow card) 5× (suspension) | Exhibition Centre – Hall B Referees: Minore, Marina (ARG) |

| July 20; 20:30 | Argentina | 30–18 | Chile | Exhibition Centre – Hall B Referees: Zuñiga, Reyes (CUB) |
| July 20; 20:30 | Mendoza 6 | (15–10) | three players 3 | Exhibition Centre – Hall B Referees: Zuñiga, Reyes (CUB) |
| July 20; 20:30 | 3× (yellow card) 1× (suspension) | report | 4× (yellow card) 3× (suspension) | Exhibition Centre – Hall B Referees: Zuñiga, Reyes (CUB) |

=== Classification round ===
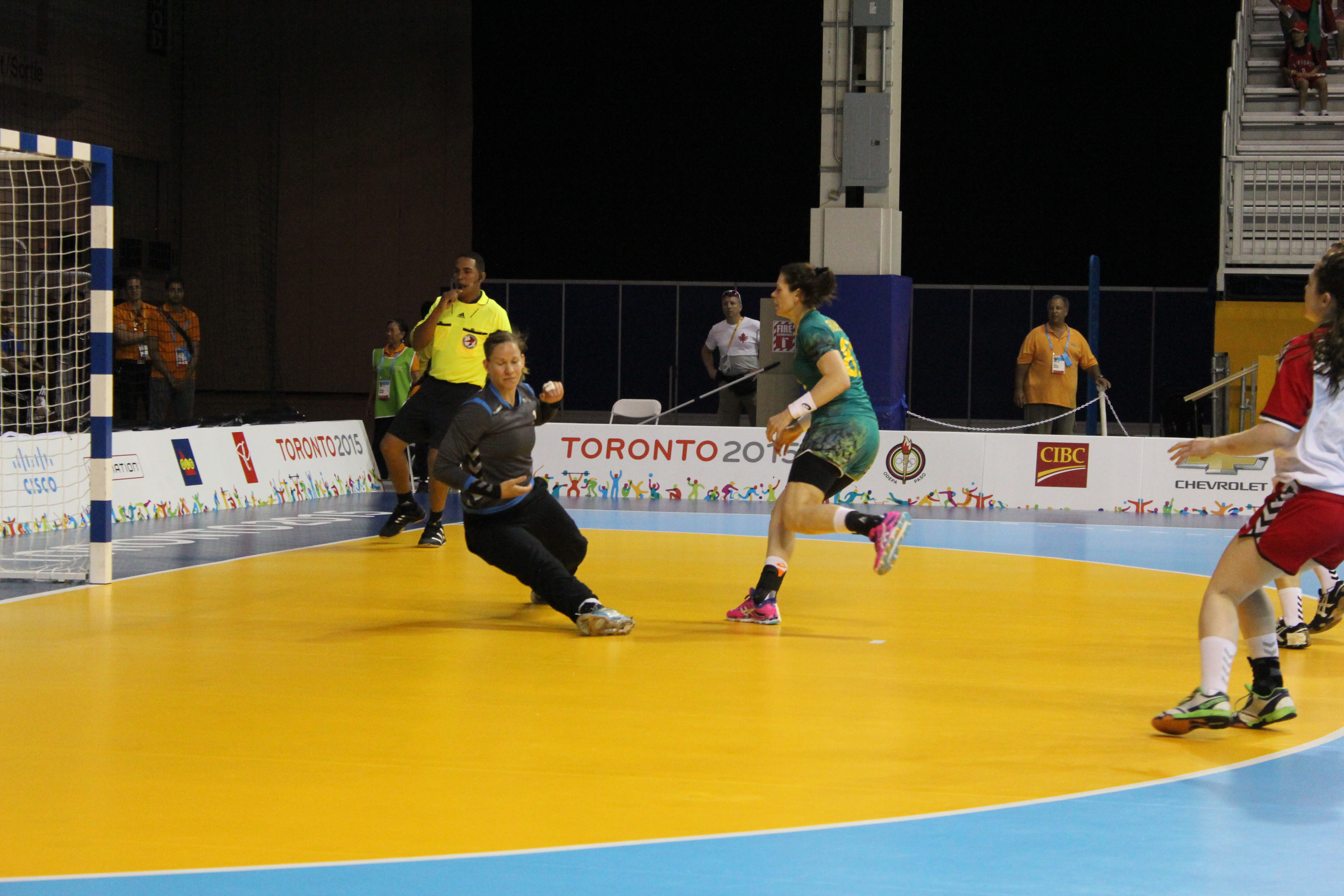
Detail from group stage mach Brazil vs Canada

Semifinals
July 22 — Toronto
Puerto Rico | 36
Chile | 34
July 22 — Toronto
Canada | 20
Cuba | 30

Fifth place
July 24 — Toronto
Puerto Rico | 27
Cuba | 40
Seventh place
July 24 — Toronto
Chile | 20
Canada | 27

==== Semifinals ====
| July 22; 11:00 | Puerto Rico | 36–34 | Chile | Exhibition Centre – Hall B Referees: Paoloantoni, Zanikian (ARG) |
| July 22; 11:00 | Ceballos 11 | (21–18) | Feuchtmann 6 | Exhibition Centre – Hall B Referees: Paoloantoni, Zanikian (ARG) |
| July 22; 11:00 | 2× (yellow card) | report | 2× (yellow card) 3× (suspension) | Exhibition Centre – Hall B Referees: Paoloantoni, Zanikian (ARG) |

| July 22; 18:00 | Canada | 20–30 | Cuba | Exhibition Centre – Hall B Referees: Lemes, Sosa (URU) |
| July 22; 18:00 | Routhier 5 | (7–18) | Lusson 9 | Exhibition Centre – Hall B Referees: Lemes, Sosa (URU) |
| July 22; 18:00 | 3× (yellow card) 2× (suspension) | report | 4× (yellow card) 5× (suspension) | Exhibition Centre – Hall B Referees: Lemes, Sosa (URU) |

==== Seventh place match ====
| July 24; 10:30 | Chile | 20–27 | Canada | Exhibition Centre – Hall B Referees: Paolantoni, Zanikian (ARG) |
| July 24; 10:30 | Miño 5 | (10–14) | Lochet, Laplante 4 | Exhibition Centre – Hall B Referees: Paolantoni, Zanikian (ARG) |
| July 24; 10:30 | 3× (yellow card) 3× (suspension) | report | 2× (yellow card) 3× (suspension) | Exhibition Centre – Hall B Referees: Paolantoni, Zanikian (ARG) |

==== Fifth place match ====
| July 24; 13:00 | Puerto Rico | 27–40 | Cuba | Exhibition Centre – Hall B Referees: Pinto, Menezes (BRA) |
| July 24; 13:00 | three players 5 | (14–20) | Reyes, Barrio 7 | Exhibition Centre – Hall B Referees: Pinto, Menezes (BRA) |
| July 24; 13:00 | 2× (yellow card) 2× (suspension) | report | 1× (yellow card) 6× (suspension) | Exhibition Centre – Hall B Referees: Pinto, Menezes (BRA) |

=== Medal round ===
Semifinals
July 22 — Toronto
Brazil | 40
Uruguay | 22
July 22 — Toronto
Mexico | 16
Argentina | 27

Final
July 24 — Toronto
Brazil | 25
Argentina | 20
Third place
July 24 — Toronto
Uruguay | 29
Mexico | 21

==== Semifinals ====
| July 22; 13:30 | Brazil | 40–22 | Uruguay | Exhibition Centre – Hall B Referees: Guzman, Perez (PUR) |
| July 22; 13:30 | Silva 8 | (18–11) | Scarrone 8 | Exhibition Centre – Hall B Referees: Guzman, Perez (PUR) |
| July 22; 13:30 | 3× (yellow card) 5× (suspension) | report | 3× (yellow card) 2× (suspension) | Exhibition Centre – Hall B Referees: Guzman, Perez (PUR) |

| July 22; 20:30 | Mexico | 16–27 | Argentina | Exhibition Centre – Hall B Referees: Gjeding, Hansen (DEN) |
| July 22; 20:30 | Jaramillo, Sifuentes 4 | (6–11) | Pizzo 7 | Exhibition Centre – Hall B Referees: Gjeding, Hansen (DEN) |
| July 22; 20:30 | 3× (yellow card) 3× (suspension) | report | 3× (yellow card) 5× (suspension) | Exhibition Centre – Hall B Referees: Gjeding, Hansen (DEN) |

==== Bronze medal match ====
| July 24; 17:30 | (bronze) Uruguay | 29–21 | Mexico | Exhibition Centre – Hall B Referees: Zuñiga, Reyes (CUB) |
| July 24; 17:30 | Barreiro 11 | (11–8) | Saavedra 7 | Exhibition Centre – Hall B Referees: Zuñiga, Reyes (CUB) |
| July 24; 17:30 | 3× (yellow card) 2× (suspension) | Report | 2× (yellow card) 6× (suspension) | Exhibition Centre – Hall B Referees: Zuñiga, Reyes (CUB) |

==== Gold medal match ====
| July 24; 20:00 | (gold) Brazil | 25–20 | Argentina (silver) | Exhibition Centre – Hall B Referees: Lemes, Sosa (URU) |
| July 24; 20:00 | Nascimento 6 | (12–12) | Mendoza, Karsten 5 | Exhibition Centre – Hall B Referees: Lemes, Sosa (URU) |
| July 24; 20:00 | 3× (yellow card) 5× (suspension) | report | 3× (yellow card) 2× (suspension) | Exhibition Centre – Hall B Referees: Lemes, Sosa (URU) |

== Final ranking ==
| Rank | Team |
|---|---|
| 1st place, gold medalist(s) | Brazil |
| 2nd place, silver medalist(s) | Argentina |
| 3rd place, bronze medalist(s) | Uruguay |
| 4 | Mexico |
| 5 | Cuba |
| 6 | Puerto Rico |
| 7 | Canada |
| 8 | Chile |

| Qualified for the 2016 Summer Olympics |
| Qualified for the Olympic Qualification Tournament |

Note: As Brazil were already qualified for the olympics as hosts, the qualification slot went to Argentina instead and Mexico qualified for the Olympic Qualification Tournament instead of Argentina.

2015 Pan American Games winners

Brazil
5th title

== Statistics ==
=== Top scorers ===
| Rank | Player | Goals |
|---|---|---|
| 1 | (Cuba) Lisandra Lusson | 48 |
| 2 | (Uruguay) Martina Barreiro | 39 |
| 3 | (Brazil) Alexandra Nascimento | 34 |
| 3 | (Puerto Rico) Nathalys Ceballos | 34 |
| 5 | (Brazil) Fernanda da Silva | 32 |

=== Top Goalkeepers ===
| Rank | Player | Saves | % |
|---|---|---|---|
| 1 | (Argentina) Valentina Kogan | 49 | 43 |
| 2 | (Argentina) Marisol Carratu | 26 | 42 |
| 3 | (Brazil) Mayssa Pessoa | 31 | 39 |
