= Yenma Ramírez =

Cuban handball player (born 1984)

Personal information
- Nationality: Cuban
- Born: 12 February 1984 (age 42)
- Height: 1.80 m (5 ft 11 in)

Sport
- Sport: Handball
- Position: Left back
- Current club: Guantánamo
National team
Years	Team	Apps	(Gls)
–	Cuba	48	(59)
Medal record
Pan American Championship
Silver medal – second place	2015 Cuba
Nor.Ca. Championship
Gold medal – first place	2015 Puerto Rico

Yenma Ramírez (born 12 February 1984) is a Cuban handball player. She plays on the Cuban national team, and participated at the 2011 World Women's Handball Championship in Brazil.
