= Handball at the 2016 Summer Olympics – Women's qualification =

The qualification for the 2016 Women's Olympic Handball Tournament was held from December 2014 to March 2016. Twelve teams qualified, the hosts, the world champion, four continental champions and six teams from the World Olympic qualification tournaments respectively.

== Qualification summary ==
| Mean of qualification | Date | Host | Vacancies | Qualified |
|---|---|---|---|---|
| Host nation | 2 October 2009 | (Denmark) Copenhagen | 1 | Brazil |
| 2014 European Championship | 7–21 December 2014 | (Croatia) Zagreb (Hungary) Budapest | 1 | Spain^{[1]} |
| 2015 African Qualification Tournament | 19–21 March 2015 | (Angola) Luanda | 1 | Angola |
| 2015 Pan American Games | 15–24 July 2015 | (Canada) Toronto | 1 | Argentina |
| 2015 Asian Qualification Tournament | 20–25 October 2015 | (Japan) Nagoya | 1 | South Korea |
| 2015 World Championship | 5–20 December 2015 | Denmark | 1 | Norway |
| 2016 Olympic Qualification Tournaments | 18–20 March 2016 | (France) Metz | 2 | Netherlands |
| 2016 Olympic Qualification Tournaments | 18–20 March 2016 | (France) Metz | 2 | France |
| 2016 Olympic Qualification Tournaments | 18–20 March 2016 | (Denmark) Aarhus | 2 | Romania |
| 2016 Olympic Qualification Tournaments | 18–20 March 2016 | (Denmark) Aarhus | 2 | Montenegro |
| 2016 Olympic Qualification Tournaments | 18–20 March 2016 | (Russia) Astrakhan | 2 | Russia |
| 2016 Olympic Qualification Tournaments | 18–20 March 2016 | (Russia) Astrakhan | 2 | Sweden |
| Total | | | 12 | |

1. Norway won the European Championship, ensuring its qualification. Norway later also won the 2015 World Championship title, which took precedence in the qualification path. Therefore, the European Championship's runner-up, Spain, received the European continental tournament berth.

== Legend for qualification type ==
| Qualified for the 2016 Summer Olympics |
| Qualified for the 2016 World Olympic Qualification Tournaments |

== Host country ==
- Brazil

== World Championship ==
| Rank | Team |
|---|---|
| Gold medal | Norway |
| Silver medal | Netherlands |
| Bronze medal | Romania |
| 4 | Poland |
| 5 | Russia |
| 6 | Denmark |
| 7 | France |
| 8 | Montenegro |
| 9 | Sweden |
| 10 | Brazil |
| 11 | Hungary |
| 12 | Spain |
| 13 | Germany |
| 14 | South Korea |
| 15 | Serbia |
| 16 | Angola |
| 17 | China |
| 18 | Argentina |
| 19 | Japan |
| 20 | Puerto Rico |
| 21 | Tunisia |
| 22 | Kazakhstan |
| 23 | Cuba |
| 24 | DR Congo |

== Continental qualification ==
=== Europe (1st ranking continent) ===
| Rank | Team |
|---|---|
| 1st place, gold medalist(s) | Norway |
| 2nd place, silver medalist(s) | Spain |
| 3rd place, bronze medalist(s) | Sweden |
| 4 | Montenegro |
| 5 | France |
| 6 | Hungary |
| 7 | Netherlands |
| 8 | Denmark |
| 9 | Romania |
| 10 | Germany |
| 11 | Poland |
| 12 | Slovakia |
| 13 | Croatia |
| 14 | Russia |
| 15 | Serbia |
| 16 | Ukraine |

=== America (2nd ranking continent) ===
| Rank | Team |
|---|---|
| 1st place, gold medalist(s) | Brazil |
| 2nd place, silver medalist(s) | Argentina |
| 3rd place, bronze medalist(s) | Uruguay |
| 4 | Mexico |
| 5 | Cuba |
| 6 | Puerto Rico |
| 7 | Canada |
| 8 | Chile |

| Qualified for the 2016 Summer Olympics |
| Qualified for the Olympic Qualification Tournament |

=== Asia (3rd ranking continent) ===
The competition was held in Nagoya, Japan.

All times are local (UTC+9).

| Pos | Team | Pld | W | D | L | GF | GA | GD | Pts | Qualification |
|---|---|---|---|---|---|---|---|---|---|---|
| 1 | South Korea | 4 | 4 | 0 | 0 | 160 | 82 | +78 | 8 | Advance to final tournament |
| 2 | Japan | 4 | 3 | 0 | 1 | 125 | 94 | +31 | 6 | Advance to qualification tournaments |
| 3 | China | 4 | 2 | 0 | 2 | 106 | 102 | +4 | 4 | |
| 4 | Kazakhstan | 4 | 1 | 0 | 3 | 103 | 114 | −11 | 2 | |
| 5 | Uzbekistan | 4 | 0 | 0 | 4 | 80 | 182 | −102 | 0 | |

Source: Asianhandball
Rules for classification: 1) points; 2) head-to-head points; 3) head-to-head goal difference; 4) head-to-head number of goals scored; 5) goal difference.

| 20 October 2015; 17:00 | Kazakhstan | 18−28 | China | Aichi Prefectural Gymnasium, Nagoya |
| 20 October 2015; 17:00 | | (8−13) | | Aichi Prefectural Gymnasium, Nagoya |

| 20 October 2015; 19:00 | Japan | 51−17 | Uzbekistan | Aichi Prefectural Gymnasium, Nagoya |
| 20 October 2015; 19:00 | | (25−10) | | Aichi Prefectural Gymnasium, Nagoya |

| 21 October 2015; 17:00 | South Korea | 35−24 | Kazakhstan | Aichi Prefectural Gymnasium, Nagoya |
| 21 October 2015; 17:00 | | (18−10) | | Aichi Prefectural Gymnasium, Nagoya |

| 21 October 2015; 19:00 | China | 19−29 | Japan | Aichi Prefectural Gymnasium, Nagoya |
| 21 October 2015; 19:00 | | (11−13) | | Aichi Prefectural Gymnasium, Nagoya |

| 22 October 2015; 17:00 | China | 22−34 | South Korea | Aichi Prefectural Gymnasium, Nagoya |
| 22 October 2015; 17:00 | | (8−15) | | Aichi Prefectural Gymnasium, Nagoya |

| 22 October 2015; 19:00 | Uzbekistan | 27−38 | Kazakhstan | Aichi Prefectural Gymnasium, Nagoya |
| 22 October 2015; 19:00 | | (15−18) | | Aichi Prefectural Gymnasium, Nagoya |

| 24 October 2015; 16:00 | Japan | 24−23 | Kazakhstan | Aichi Prefectural Gymnasium, Nagoya |
| 24 October 2015; 16:00 | | (13−11) | | Aichi Prefectural Gymnasium, Nagoya |

| 24 October 2015; 18:00 | Uzbekistan | 15−56 | South Korea | Aichi Prefectural Gymnasium, Nagoya |
| 24 October 2015; 18:00 | | (8−30) | | Aichi Prefectural Gymnasium, Nagoya |

| 25 October 2015; 14:00 | Uzbekistan | 21–37 | China | Aichi Prefectural Gymnasium, Nagoya |
| 25 October 2015; 14:00 | | (6–21) | | Aichi Prefectural Gymnasium, Nagoya |

| 25 October 2015; 16:00 | South Korea | 35–21 | Japan | Aichi Prefectural Gymnasium, Nagoya |
| 25 October 2015; 16:00 | | (17–11) | | Aichi Prefectural Gymnasium, Nagoya |

=== Africa (4th ranking continent) ===
The competition was held in Luanda, Angola.

All times are local (UTC+1).

| Pos | Team | Pld | W | D | L | GF | GA | GD | Pts | Qualification |
|---|---|---|---|---|---|---|---|---|---|---|
| 1 | Angola | 3 | 3 | 0 | 0 | 100 | 72 | +28 | 6 | Advance to final tournament |
| 2 | Tunisia | 3 | 2 | 0 | 1 | 74 | 66 | +8 | 4 | Advance to qualification tournaments |
| 3 | Senegal | 3 | 1 | 0 | 2 | 65 | 85 | −20 | 2 | |
| 4 | DR Congo | 3 | 0 | 0 | 3 | 71 | 87 | −16 | 0 | |

Rules for classification: 1) points; 2) head-to-head points; 3) head-to-head goal difference; 4) head-to-head number of goals scored; 5) goal difference.

| 19 March 2015; 18:00 | Angola | 38−21 | Senegal | Pavilhão da Cidadela, Luanda |
| 19 March 2015; 18:00 | | (20–10) | | Pavilhão da Cidadela, Luanda |
| 19 March 2015; 18:00 | | Report | | Pavilhão da Cidadela, Luanda |

| 19 March 2015; 20:00 | Tunisia | 26−21 | DR Congo | Pavilhão da Cidadela, Luanda |
| 19 March 2015; 20:00 | | (14–11) | | Pavilhão da Cidadela, Luanda |
| 19 March 2015; 20:00 | | Report | | Pavilhão da Cidadela, Luanda |

| 20 March 2015; 18:00 | Senegal | 19−25 | Tunisia | Pavilhão da Cidadela, Luanda |
| 20 March 2015; 18:00 | | (13–13) | | Pavilhão da Cidadela, Luanda |
| 20 March 2015; 18:00 | | Report | | Pavilhão da Cidadela, Luanda |

| 20 March 2015; 20:00 | Angola | 36−28 | DR Congo | Pavilhão da Cidadela, Luanda |
| 20 March 2015; 20:00 | | (19–13) | | Pavilhão da Cidadela, Luanda |
| 20 March 2015; 20:00 | | Report | | Pavilhão da Cidadela, Luanda |

| 21 March 2015; 18:00 | DR Congo | 22–25 | Senegal | Pavilhão da Cidadela, Luanda |
| 21 March 2015; 18:00 | | (14–11) | | Pavilhão da Cidadela, Luanda |
| 21 March 2015; 18:00 | | Report | | Pavilhão da Cidadela, Luanda |

| 21 March 2015; 20:00 | Angola | 26–23 | Tunisia | Pavilhão da Cidadela, Luanda |
| 21 March 2015; 20:00 | | (10–12) | | Pavilhão da Cidadela, Luanda |
| 21 March 2015; 20:00 | | Report | | Pavilhão da Cidadela, Luanda |

== Olympic Qualification Tournaments ==
The Olympic Qualification Tournaments were held on 18–20 March 2016. Only twelve teams that have not yet qualified through the five events mentioned above could play in the tournament:

- The top six teams from the World championship that did not already qualify through their continental championships are eligible to participate in the tournament.
- The best ranked teams of each continent in the World championship represented the continent in order to determine the continental ranking. The first ranked continent received two more places for the tournament. The second, third and fourth ranked continent received one place each. The last place belongs to a team from Oceania, if it was ranked between 8th–12th at the World Championship. But, as no team from Oceania met this condition, the second ranked continent received an extra place instead. The teams, which already earned their places through their World championship ranking were not considered for receiving places through the continental criterion.
- The twelve teams were allocated in three pools of four teams according to the table below. The top two teams from each pool qualified for the 2016 Olympic Games.

| 2016 Olympic Qualification Tournament #1 | 2016 Olympic Qualification Tournament #2 | 2016 Olympic Qualification Tournament #3 |
|---|---|---|
| 2nd from World: Netherlands; 7th from World: France; 2nd from Asia: Japan; 2nd from Africa: Tunisia | 3rd from World: Romania; 6th from World: Denmark; 3rd from Americas: Uruguay; 4th from Europe: Montenegro | 4th from World: Poland; 5th from World: Russia; 3rd from Europe: Sweden; 4th from Americas: Mexico |

=== 2016 Olympic Qualification Tournament #1 ===
| Pos | Team | Pld | W | D | L | GF | GA | GD | Pts | Qualification |
|---|---|---|---|---|---|---|---|---|---|---|
| 1 | Netherlands | 3 | 3 | 0 | 0 | 103 | 62 | +41 | 6 | Advanced to final tournament |
| 2 | France (H) | 3 | 2 | 0 | 1 | 75 | 56 | +19 | 4 | Advanced to final tournament |
| 3 | Japan | 3 | 1 | 0 | 2 | 79 | 78 | +1 | 2 | |
| 4 | Tunisia | 3 | 0 | 0 | 3 | 55 | 116 | −61 | 0 | |

Source: IHF
Rules for classification: 1) points; 2) head-to-head points; 3) head-to-head goal difference; 4) head-to-head number of goals scored; 5) goal difference.
(H) Hosts

All times are local (UTC+1).

| 18 March 2016; 16:45 | Japan | 37–20 | Tunisia | Arènes de Metz, Metz; Attendance: 4,000; Referees: Gatelis, Mažeika (LTU) |
| 18 March 2016; 16:45 | Fujii 8 | (19–8) | Hamrouni 7 | Arènes de Metz, Metz; Attendance: 4,000; Referees: Gatelis, Mažeika (LTU) |
| 18 March 2016; 16:45 | 3× (yellow card) 3× (suspension) | Report | 3× (yellow card) 2× (suspension) | Arènes de Metz, Metz; Attendance: 4,000; Referees: Gatelis, Mažeika (LTU) |

| 18 March 2016; 19:00 | Netherlands | 24–17 | France | Arènes de Metz, Metz; Attendance: 5,000; Referees: Arntsen, Røen (NOR) |
| 18 March 2016; 19:00 | Van der Heijden 5 | (9–7) | Dembélé 5 | Arènes de Metz, Metz; Attendance: 5,000; Referees: Arntsen, Røen (NOR) |
| 18 March 2016; 19:00 | 2× (yellow card) 2× (suspension) | Report | 3× (yellow card) 3× (suspension) | Arènes de Metz, Metz; Attendance: 5,000; Referees: Arntsen, Røen (NOR) |

| 19 March 2016; 16:45 | Netherlands | 33–25 | Japan | Arènes de Metz, Metz; Attendance: 4,000; Referees: Nachevski, Nikolov (MKD) |
| 19 March 2016; 16:45 | Malestein 8 | (15–16) | Yokoshima 7 | Arènes de Metz, Metz; Attendance: 4,000; Referees: Nachevski, Nikolov (MKD) |
| 19 March 2016; 16:45 | 3× (yellow card) 5× (suspension) | Report | 3× (yellow card) 3× (suspension) | Arènes de Metz, Metz; Attendance: 4,000; Referees: Nachevski, Nikolov (MKD) |

| 19 March 2016; 19:00 | France | 33–15 | Tunisia | Arènes de Metz, Metz; Attendance: 4,000; Referees: Gatelis, Mažeika (LTU) |
| 19 March 2016; 19:00 | Houette 8 | (20–6) | three players 3 | Arènes de Metz, Metz; Attendance: 4,000; Referees: Gatelis, Mažeika (LTU) |
| 19 March 2016; 19:00 | 4× (yellow card) 4× (suspension) | Report | 3× (yellow card) 3× (suspension) 1× (red card) | Arènes de Metz, Metz; Attendance: 4,000; Referees: Gatelis, Mažeika (LTU) |

| 20 March 2016; 17:45 | Tunisia | 20–46 | Netherlands | Arènes de Metz, Metz; Attendance: 2,800; Referees: Arntsen, Røen (NOR) |
| 20 March 2016; 17:45 | three players 3 | (10–27) | Abbingh 8 | Arènes de Metz, Metz; Attendance: 2,800; Referees: Arntsen, Røen (NOR) |
| 20 March 2016; 17:45 | 3× (yellow card) 3× (suspension) | Report | 3× (yellow card) 4× (suspension) | Arènes de Metz, Metz; Attendance: 2,800; Referees: Arntsen, Røen (NOR) |

| 20 March 2016; 19:30 | France | 25–17 | Japan | Arènes de Metz, Metz; Attendance: 4,000; Referees: Nachevski, Nikolov (MKD) |
| 20 March 2016; 19:30 | Pineau 7 | (11–7) | Fujii 5 | Arènes de Metz, Metz; Attendance: 4,000; Referees: Nachevski, Nikolov (MKD) |
| 20 March 2016; 19:30 | 3× (yellow card) 1× (suspension) | Report | 3× (yellow card) 2× (suspension) | Arènes de Metz, Metz; Attendance: 4,000; Referees: Nachevski, Nikolov (MKD) |

=== 2016 Olympic Qualification Tournament #2 ===
| Pos | Team | Pld | W | D | L | GF | GA | GD | Pts | Qualification |
|---|---|---|---|---|---|---|---|---|---|---|
| 1 | Romania | 3 | 2 | 1 | 0 | 91 | 67 | +24 | 5 | Advanced to final tournament |
| 2 | Montenegro | 3 | 2 | 1 | 0 | 83 | 64 | +19 | 5 | Advanced to final tournament |
| 3 | Denmark (H) | 3 | 1 | 0 | 2 | 85 | 75 | +10 | 2 | |
| 4 | Uruguay | 3 | 0 | 0 | 3 | 55 | 108 | −53 | 0 | |

Source: IHF
Rules for classification: 1) points; 2) head-to-head points; 3) head-to-head goal difference; 4) head-to-head number of goals scored; 5) goal difference.
(H) Hosts

All times are local (UTC+1).

| 18 March 2016; 16:45 | Uruguay | 19–34 | Montenegro | Ceres Arena, Aarhus; Attendance: 1,100; Referees: Alpaidze, Berezkina (RUS) |
| 18 March 2016; 16:45 | Scarrone 4 | (10–15) | Mehmedović 7 | Ceres Arena, Aarhus; Attendance: 1,100; Referees: Alpaidze, Berezkina (RUS) |
| 18 March 2016; 16:45 | 2× (yellow card) 3× (suspension) | Report | 3× (yellow card) 5× (suspension) | Ceres Arena, Aarhus; Attendance: 1,100; Referees: Alpaidze, Berezkina (RUS) |

| 18 March 2016; 19:00 | Romania | 32–25 | Denmark | Ceres Arena, Aarhus; Attendance: 3,100; Referees: Geipel, Helbig (GER) |
| 18 March 2016; 19:00 | Buceschi 10 | (19–13) | Dalby, Spellerberg 4 | Ceres Arena, Aarhus; Attendance: 3,100; Referees: Geipel, Helbig (GER) |
| 18 March 2016; 19:00 | 2× (yellow card) 3× (suspension) | Report | 3× (yellow card) 4× (suspension) | Ceres Arena, Aarhus; Attendance: 3,100; Referees: Geipel, Helbig (GER) |

| 19 March 2016; 17:45 | Romania | 36–19 | Uruguay | Ceres Arena, Aarhus; Referees: Alpaidze, Berezkina (RUS) |
| 19 March 2016; 17:45 | Chintoan 9 | (17–10) | Fynn 4 | Ceres Arena, Aarhus; Referees: Alpaidze, Berezkina (RUS) |
| 19 March 2016; 17:45 | 3× (yellow card) 3× (suspension) | Report | 3× (yellow card) 6× (suspension) | Ceres Arena, Aarhus; Referees: Alpaidze, Berezkina (RUS) |

| 19 March 2016; 20:00 | Denmark | 22–26 | Montenegro | Ceres Arena, Aarhus; Attendance: 3,200; Referees: Horáček, Novotný (CZE) |
| 19 March 2016; 20:00 | Jørgensen 7 | (10–13) | Bulatović 9 | Ceres Arena, Aarhus; Attendance: 3,200; Referees: Horáček, Novotný (CZE) |
| 19 March 2016; 20:00 | 3× (yellow card) 4× (suspension) | Report | 3× (yellow card) 4× (suspension) | Ceres Arena, Aarhus; Attendance: 3,200; Referees: Horáček, Novotný (CZE) |

| 20 March 2016; 17:30 | Montenegro | 23–23 | Romania | Ceres Arena, Aarhus; Attendance: 1,200; Referees: Horáček, Novotný (CZE) |
| 20 March 2016; 17:30 | Despotović 8 | (11–15) | Chintoan 6 | Ceres Arena, Aarhus; Attendance: 1,200; Referees: Horáček, Novotný (CZE) |
| 20 March 2016; 17:30 | 3× (yellow card) 6× (suspension) | Report | 2× (yellow card) 3× (suspension) | Ceres Arena, Aarhus; Attendance: 1,200; Referees: Horáček, Novotný (CZE) |

| 20 March 2016; 20:00 | Denmark | 38–17 | Uruguay | Ceres Arena, Aarhus; Attendance: 1,500; Referees: Geipel, Helbig (GER) |
| 20 March 2016; 20:00 | Rej 9 | (19–7) | Barreiro 8 | Ceres Arena, Aarhus; Attendance: 1,500; Referees: Geipel, Helbig (GER) |
| 20 March 2016; 20:00 | 3× (yellow card) 4× (suspension) | Report | 2× (yellow card) 4× (suspension) | Ceres Arena, Aarhus; Attendance: 1,500; Referees: Geipel, Helbig (GER) |

=== 2016 Olympic Qualification Tournament #3 ===
| Pos | Team | Pld | W | D | L | GF | GA | GD | Pts | Qualification |
|---|---|---|---|---|---|---|---|---|---|---|
| 1 | Russia (H) | 3 | 3 | 0 | 0 | 101 | 71 | +30 | 6 | Advanced to final tournament |
| 2 | Sweden | 3 | 2 | 0 | 1 | 100 | 81 | +19 | 4 | Advanced to final tournament |
| 3 | Poland | 3 | 1 | 0 | 2 | 85 | 71 | +14 | 2 | |
| 4 | Mexico | 3 | 0 | 0 | 3 | 51 | 114 | −63 | 0 | |

Source: IHF
Rules for classification: 1) points; 2) head-to-head points; 3) head-to-head goal difference; 4) head-to-head number of goals scored; 5) goal difference.
(H) Hosts

All times are local (UTC+3).

| 18 March 2016; 17:30 | Poland | 25–27 | Russia | Sportcomplex Zvezdny, Astrakhan; Attendance: 6,000; Referees: Koo, Lee (KOR) |
| 18 March 2016; 17:30 | Kobylińska 5 | (11–11) | Vyakhireva 7 | Sportcomplex Zvezdny, Astrakhan; Attendance: 6,000; Referees: Koo, Lee (KOR) |
| 18 March 2016; 17:30 | 2× (yellow card) 2× (suspension) | Report | 4× (yellow card) 3× (suspension) | Sportcomplex Zvezdny, Astrakhan; Attendance: 6,000; Referees: Koo, Lee (KOR) |

| 18 March 2016; 20:00 | Sweden | 41–20 | Mexico | Sportcomplex Zvezdny, Astrakhan; Attendance: 1,000; Referees: Lah, Sok (SLO) |
| 18 March 2016; 20:00 | Sand 5 | (21–9) | Aguirre 8 | Sportcomplex Zvezdny, Astrakhan; Attendance: 1,000; Referees: Lah, Sok (SLO) |
| 18 March 2016; 20:00 | 3× (yellow card) 5× (suspension) | Report | 3× (yellow card) 2× (suspension) | Sportcomplex Zvezdny, Astrakhan; Attendance: 1,000; Referees: Lah, Sok (SLO) |

| 19 March 2016; 16:00 | Poland | 24–30 | Sweden | Sportcomplex Zvezdny, Astrakhan; Attendance: 3,700; Referees: Bonaventura, Bonaventura (FRA) |
| 19 March 2016; 16:00 | Zych 6 | (12–16) | Alm 6 | Sportcomplex Zvezdny, Astrakhan; Attendance: 3,700; Referees: Bonaventura, Bonaventura (FRA) |
| 19 March 2016; 16:00 | 3× (yellow card) 1× (suspension) | Report | 3× (yellow card) 3× (suspension) | Sportcomplex Zvezdny, Astrakhan; Attendance: 3,700; Referees: Bonaventura, Bonaventura (FRA) |

| 19 March 2016; 18:30 | Russia | 37–17 | Mexico | Sportcomplex Zvezdny, Astrakhan; Attendance: 6,000; Referees: Koo, Lee (KOR) |
| 19 March 2016; 18:30 | Gorshkova 6 | (17–11) | Sifuentes 5 | Sportcomplex Zvezdny, Astrakhan; Attendance: 6,000; Referees: Koo, Lee (KOR) |
| 19 March 2016; 18:30 | 3× (yellow card) 5× (suspension) | Report | 3× (yellow card) 3× (suspension) 1× (red card) | Sportcomplex Zvezdny, Astrakhan; Attendance: 6,000; Referees: Koo, Lee (KOR) |

| 20 March 2016; 18:00 | Russia | 37–29 | Sweden | Sportcomplex Zvezdny, Astrakhan; Attendance: 6,000; Referees: Lah, Sok (SLO) |
| 20 March 2016; 18:00 | Dmitrieva, Vyakhireva 7 | (15–10) | Gulldén 8 | Sportcomplex Zvezdny, Astrakhan; Attendance: 6,000; Referees: Lah, Sok (SLO) |
| 20 March 2016; 18:00 | 3× (yellow card) 2× (suspension) | Report | 3× (yellow card) 3× (suspension) | Sportcomplex Zvezdny, Astrakhan; Attendance: 6,000; Referees: Lah, Sok (SLO) |

| 20 March 2016; 20:30 | Mexico | 14–36 | Poland | Sportcomplex Zvezdny, Astrakhan; Attendance: 1,500; Referees: Bonaventura, Bonaventura (FRA) |
| 20 March 2016; 20:30 | Esquivel 6 | (5–18) | Kołodziejsk 8 | Sportcomplex Zvezdny, Astrakhan; Attendance: 1,500; Referees: Bonaventura, Bonaventura (FRA) |
| 20 March 2016; 20:30 | 3× (yellow card) 1× (suspension) | Report | 3× (yellow card) 2× (suspension) | Sportcomplex Zvezdny, Astrakhan; Attendance: 1,500; Referees: Bonaventura, Bonaventura (FRA) |
