= 2025 Nor.Ca. Women's Handball Championship =

Tournament details
- Host country: Mexico
- Venue(s): 1 (in 1 host city)
- Dates: 7–12 April
- Teams: 5 (from 1 confederation)

Final positions
- Champions: Cuba (3rd title)
- Runner-up: Mexico
- Third place: Canada
- Fourth place: United States

Tournament statistics
- Matches played: 12
- Goals scored: 599 (49.92 per match)

‌The 2025 Nor.Ca. Women's Handball Championship was the sixth edition of the championship, held from 7 to 12 April 2025 in Mexico City, Mexico under the aegis of North America and Caribbean Handball Confederation. The championship acted as the qualification tournament for the 2025 World Women's Handball Championship, with the top team from the championship directly qualifying for the event.

Defending champions Greenland did not enter due to financial reasons. Cuba won the tournament after a finals win over Mexico.

== Teams ==
Five teams participated.

- Canada
- Cuba
- Puerto Rico
- Mexico (hosts)
- United States

== Venue ==
The venue is the Mexican Olympic Training Center in Mexico City.

== Preliminary round ==
=== Standings ===
Pos	Team	Pld	W	D	L	GF	GA	GD	Pts	Qualification
1	Cuba	4	4	0	0	125	79	+46	8	Final
2	Mexico (H)	4	3	0	1	98	87	+11	6	Final
3	Canada	4	2	0	2	100	100	0	4	Third place game
4	United States	4	1	0	3	83	103	−20	2	Third place game
5	Puerto Rico	4	0	0	4	94	131	−37	0	

Rules for classification: 1) points; 2) head-to-head points; 3) head-to-head goal difference; 4) head-to-head number of goals scored; 5) goal difference.
(H) Hosts

=== Results ===
All times are local (UTC−6).

7 April 2025; 16:00	Canada	37–26	Puerto Rico	Mexican Olympic Training Center, Mexico City
7 April 2025; 16:00		(16–8)		Mexican Olympic Training Center, Mexico City

7 April 2025; 18:00	Mexico	21–19	United States	Mexican Olympic Training Center, Mexico City
7 April 2025; 18:00		(12–6)		Mexican Olympic Training Center, Mexico City

8 April 2025; 16:00	United States	17–26	Canada	Mexican Olympic Training Center, Mexico City
8 April 2025; 16:00		(9–15)		Mexican Olympic Training Center, Mexico City

8 April 2025; 18:00	Puerto Rico	23–35	Cuba	Mexican Olympic Training Center, Mexico City
8 April 2025; 18:00		(10–17)		Mexican Olympic Training Center, Mexico City

9 April 2025; 16:00	Cuba	29–19	Canada	Mexican Olympic Training Center, Mexico City
9 April 2025; 16:00		(18–12)		Mexican Olympic Training Center, Mexico City

9 April 2025; 18:00	Puerto Rico	23–28	Mexico	Mexican Olympic Training Center, Mexico City
9 April 2025; 18:00		(10–13)		Mexican Olympic Training Center, Mexico City

10 April 2025; 16:00	United States	31–22	Puerto Rico	Mexican Olympic Training Center, Mexico City
10 April 2025; 16:00		(16–9)		Mexican Olympic Training Center, Mexico City

10 April 2025; 18:00	Mexico	21–27	Cuba	Mexican Olympic Training Center, Mexico City
10 April 2025; 18:00		(11–13)		Mexican Olympic Training Center, Mexico City

11 April 2025; 16:00	Cuba	34–16	United States	Mexican Olympic Training Center, Mexico City
11 April 2025; 16:00		(15–7)		Mexican Olympic Training Center, Mexico City

11 April 2025; 18:00	Canada	18–28	Mexico	Mexican Olympic Training Center, Mexico City
11 April 2025; 18:00		(8–13)		Mexican Olympic Training Center, Mexico City

== Knockout stage ==
=== Third place game ===
12 April 2025; 14:00	Canada	26–20	United States	Mexican Olympic Training Center, Mexico City
12 April 2025; 14:00		(11–12)		Mexican Olympic Training Center, Mexico City

=== Final ===
12 April 2025; 16:00	Cuba	32–21	Mexico	Mexican Olympic Training Center, Mexico City
12 April 2025; 16:00		(15–10)		Mexican Olympic Training Center, Mexico City

== Final standing ==
Rank	Team
1st place, gold medalist(s)	Cuba
2nd place, silver medalist(s)	Mexico
3rd place, bronze medalist(s)	Canada
4	United States
5	Puerto Rico

Team qualified for the 2025 World Women's Handball Championship

== Cuban players leaving ==
Three players from Cuba Naomis Mustelier, Islenia Parra and Nahomi Rodríguez left the team after the training on Thursday morning 10 April. They only played the first three games.
