= Lizandra Lusson =

Cuban handball player (born 1986)

Lisandra Lusson
Personal information
- Full name: Lisandra Lusson Miranda
- Born: 29 September 1986 (age 40) Havana, Cuba
- Height: 1.80 m (5 ft 11 in)

Sport
- Sport: Handball
- Position: Left back
- Current club: BM Remudas
- Number: 9

Senior clubs
- Years: Team
- –: Havana
- 2016–2020: BM Remudas
National team
Years	Team	Apps	(Gls)
–	Cuba	217	(1079)
Medal record
Pan American Games
Silver medal – second place	2007 Rio de Janeiro	Team
Bronze medal – third place	2019 Lima	Team
Pan American Championship
Silver medal – second place	2015 Cuba
Nor.Ca. Championship
Gold medal – first place	2015 Puerto Rico

Lisandra Lusson Miranda (born 29 September 1986) is a Cuban handball player for BM Remudas and the Cuban national team.

She participated at the 2011 World Women's Handball Championship in Brazil. and the 2015 World Women's Handball Championship in Denmark.

== Individual achiviements ==
- Top Scorer:
  - 2015 Pan American Games
