= 2023 Nor.Ca. Women's Handball Championship =

Women's handball tournament in Greenland

Tournament details
- Host country: Greenland
- Venue(s): 1 (in 1 host city)
- Dates: 5–11 June
- Teams: 5 (from 1 confederation)

Final positions
- Champions: Greenland (1st title)
- Runner-up: Canada
- Third place: Mexico
- Fourth place: Cuba

Tournament statistics
- Matches played: 12
- Goals scored: 569 (47.42 per match)
- Top scorer(s): (Mexico) Gemma Burgos (34 goals)

Awards
- Best player: (Greenland) Ivalu Bjerge

‌The 2023 Nor.Ca. Women's Handball Championship was the fifth edition of the championship, held from 5 to 11 June 2023 in Nuuk, Greenland under the aegis of North America and Caribbean Handball Confederation. It was the first time in history that the championship was organised by the Greenland Handball Federation and it also acted as the qualification tournament for the 2023 World Women's Handball Championship, with the top team from the championship directly qualifying for the event.

Greenland won their first title after defeating Canada in the final.

== Teams ==
Five teams participated.

- Canada
- Cuba
- Greenland
- Mexico
- United States

== Preliminary round ==
=== Standings ===
Pos	Team	Pld	W	D	L	GF	GA	GD	Pts	Qualification
1	Greenland (H)	4	4	0	0	106	72	+34	8	Final
2	Canada	4	3	0	1	104	90	+14	6	Final
3	Mexico	4	2	0	2	109	104	+5	4	Third place game
4	Cuba	4	1	0	3	105	96	+9	2	Third place game
5	United States	4	0	0	4	57	119	−62	0	

Source: NACHC
Rules for classification: 1) points; 2) head-to-head points; 3) head-to-head goal difference; 4) head-to-head number of goals scored; 5) goal difference.
(H) Hosts

=== Results ===
All times are local (UTC−1).

5 June 2023; 17:00	Cuba	26–32	Mexico	Inussivik, Nuuk
5 June 2023; 17:00	Armenteros 7	(12–10)	Botello 6	Inussivik, Nuuk
5 June 2023; 17:00	2× (suspension)	Report	3× (suspension)	Inussivik, Nuuk

5 June 2023; 20:00	Greenland	30–19	Canada	Inussivik, Nuuk
5 June 2023; 20:00	Lukassen, N. Lyberth 5	(14–8)	Lacasse 5	Inussivik, Nuuk
5 June 2023; 20:00	4× (suspension)	Report	4× (suspension)	Inussivik, Nuuk

6 June 2023; 17:30	Canada	26–11	United States	Inussivik, Nuuk; Attendance: 250
6 June 2023; 17:30	Zimmer 7	(14–6)	Darling, Taylor 3	Inussivik, Nuuk; Attendance: 250
6 June 2023; 17:30	1× (yellow card) 2× (suspension)	Report	5× (suspension)	Inussivik, Nuuk; Attendance: 250

6 June 2023; 20:00	Cuba	19–25	Greenland	Inussivik, Nuuk; Attendance: 1,200
6 June 2023; 20:00	Armenteros, González 6	(13–12)	Gadgaard, Anj. Heilmann 5	Inussivik, Nuuk; Attendance: 1,200
6 June 2023; 20:00	4× (suspension)	Report	2× (suspension)	Inussivik, Nuuk; Attendance: 1,200

7 June 2023; 17:30	Mexico	25–32	Canada	Inussivik, Nuuk; Attendance: 400
7 June 2023; 17:30	Burgos, Gallegos 8	(14–19)	Pallas, Zimmer 8	Inussivik, Nuuk; Attendance: 400
7 June 2023; 17:30	1× (yellow card) 4× (suspension)	Report	4× (suspension)	Inussivik, Nuuk; Attendance: 400

7 June 2023; 20:00	Greenland	27–12	United States	Inussivik, Nuuk; Attendance: 1,200
7 June 2023; 20:00	Bjerge, Zeeb 5	(16–5)	Monroy 5	Inussivik, Nuuk; Attendance: 1,200
7 June 2023; 20:00	2× (suspension)	Report	3× (suspension)	Inussivik, Nuuk; Attendance: 1,200

9 June 2023; 17:30	United States	22–30	Mexico	Inussivik, Nuuk; Attendance: 400
9 June 2023; 17:30	Valonne 7	(8–15)	Three players 4	Inussivik, Nuuk; Attendance: 400
9 June 2023; 17:30	1× (suspension)	Report	4× (suspension)	Inussivik, Nuuk; Attendance: 400

9 June 2023; 20:00	Canada	27–24	Cuba	Inussivik, Nuuk; Attendance: 400
9 June 2023; 20:00	Pallas 5	(12–12)	Romero 6	Inussivik, Nuuk; Attendance: 400
9 June 2023; 20:00	5× (suspension) 1× (red card)	Report	1× (yellow card) 4× (suspension)	Inussivik, Nuuk; Attendance: 400

10 June 2023; 17:30	United States	12–36	Cuba	Inussivik, Nuuk; Attendance: 300
10 June 2023; 17:30	Clerc, Timmermann 3	(6–15)	Elliott 7	Inussivik, Nuuk; Attendance: 300
10 June 2023; 17:30	3× (suspension)	Report	1× (yellow card) 2× (suspension)	Inussivik, Nuuk; Attendance: 300

10 June 2023; 20:00	Mexico	22–24	Greenland	Inussivik, Nuuk
10 June 2023; 20:00	Burgos 9	(8–14)	Zeeb 6	Inussivik, Nuuk
10 June 2023; 20:00	3× (suspension)	Report	3× (suspension)	Inussivik, Nuuk

== Knockout stage ==
=== Third place game ===
11 June 2023; 13:00	Mexico	29–27	Cuba	Inussivik, Nuuk; Attendance: 900
11 June 2023; 13:00	Rubalcava 6	(12–11)	González 8	Inussivik, Nuuk; Attendance: 900
11 June 2023; 13:00	2× (suspension)	Report	1× (yellow card) 6× (suspension)	Inussivik, Nuuk; Attendance: 900

=== Final ===
11 June 2023; 16:00	Greenland	17–15	Canada	Inussivik, Nuuk; Attendance: 1,400
11 June 2023; 16:00	Bjerge 7	(9–6)	Routhier 5	Inussivik, Nuuk; Attendance: 1,400
11 June 2023; 16:00	1× (suspension)	Report	4× (suspension)	Inussivik, Nuuk; Attendance: 1,400

== Final standing ==
Rank	Team
1st place, gold medalist(s)	Greenland
2nd place, silver medalist(s)	Canada
3rd place, bronze medalist(s)	Mexico
4	Cuba
5	United States

Team qualified for the 2023 World Women's Handball Championship

== All Star Team ==
The all-star team was announced on 11 June 2023.

Position	Player
Goalkeeper	(Canada) Vassilia Gagnon
Right wing	(Canada) Maksi Pallas
Right back	(Cuba) Rosa Armenteros
Centre back	(Greenland) Najaaja Lyberth
Left back	(Canada) Myriam Zimmer
Left wing	(Greenland) Andrea Heilmann
Pivot	(Cuba) Arisleidy Herrera
MVP	(Greenland) Ivalu Bjerge
