= Johannes Groth =

Greenlandic handball player and coach (born 1988)

Personal information
- Nationality: Greenlandic
- Born: 9 November 1988 (age 37) Sisimiut, Greenland
- Height: 179 cm (70 in)

Sport
- Sport: Handball
National team
- Years: Team
- 2007: Greenland

Teams managed
- Years: Team
- 2011-2016: Grønlands Seminariums Sportklub (Women)
- ????-2016: Grønlands Seminariums Sportklub (Men)
- 2012-2016: Greenland Women (Assistant)
- 2016-2021: Greenland Women
- Updated on 8 May 2021

Johannes Groth (born 9 November 1988) is a Greenlandic former handballer for the Greenlandic national team and current coach of the Greenlandic women's national team.

== Coaching ==
He began in 2011 with the women's team of the Grønlands Seminariums Sportklub. One year later he became assistant coach of Greenlandic women's national team and 2016 the head coach. In May 2021 he resigned from the coaching position shortly before the 2021 Nor.Ca. Women's Handball Championship.
