= Maricet Fernández =

Cuban handball player (born 1989)

Personal information
- Nationality: Cuban
- Born: 6 December 1989 (age 36)

Sport
- Sport: Handball

Senior clubs
- Years: Team
- 2015-2015: Adesal Córdoba
- 2015–2016: KH-7 Granollers
National team
- Years: Team
- –: Cuba

Maricet Fernández (born 6 December 1989) is a team handball player from Cuba. She plays on the Cuba women's national handball team, and participated at the 2011 World Women's Handball Championship held in Brazil.
