= Danielys Herranz =

Cuban handball player (born 1999)

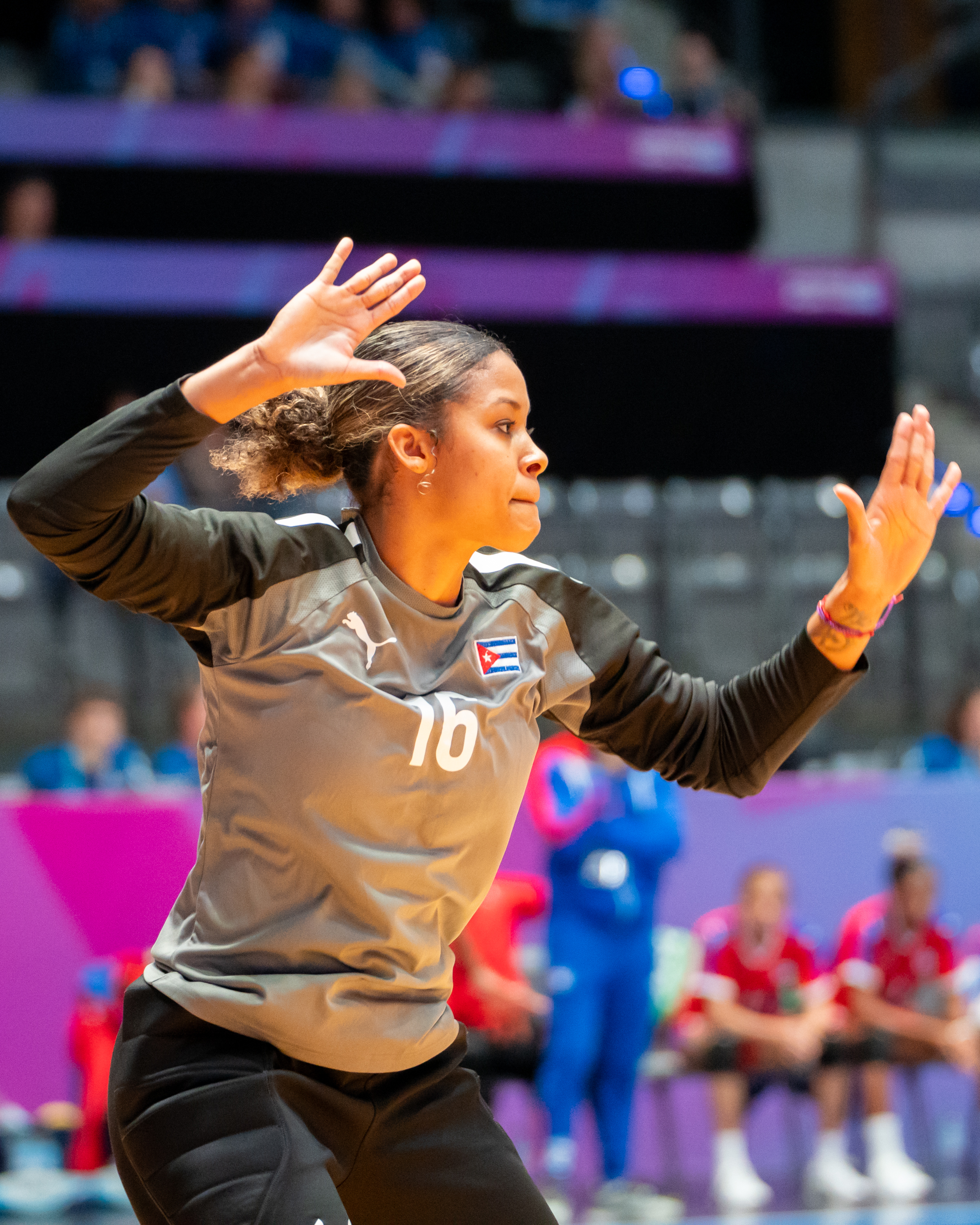

Personal information
- Full name: Danielys Herranz Reyes
- Nationality: Cuban
- Born: 26 January 1999 (age 27)
- Height: 1.76 m (5 ft 9 in)

Sport
- Sport: Handball
- Position: Goalkeeper
- Current club: HAC Nuoro

Senior clubs
- Years: Team
- –: Matanzas
- –: HAC Nuoro
National team
Years	Team	Apps	(Gls)
–	Cuba	35	(2)
Medal record
Central American and Caribbean Games
Gold medal – first place	2023 San Salvador	Team
- Updated on 27 November 2025

Danielys Herranz Reyes (born 26 January 1999) is a Cuban handball player for HAC Nuoro and the Cuban national team.

She represented Cuba at the 2019 World Women's Handball Championship.
