= Jan Laugesen =

Danish handball coach (born 1964)

Personal information
- Full name: Jan Wulff Laugesen
- Nationality: Danish
- Born: 23 October 1964 (age 61) Denmark

Sport
- Sport: Handball

Teams managed
- Years: Team
- 1997-1999: Frederikshavn fI
- 1999-????: Greenland Women
- 2000-2002: Viborg HK (Assistant)
- 2002-2004: Kolding IF
- 2004-2005: GV Ejby
- 2006-2010: SønderjyskE
- 2010-2011: HC Odense
- 2011-2012: KIF Vejen
- 2014-2015: Horsens HK (Assistant)
- 2016-2017: Horsens HK
- 2016-2018: Horsens HK (Assistant)
- Updated on 8 May 2021

Jan Wulff Laugesen (born 23 October 1964) is a Danish handball coach. He coached the Greenlandic women's national team at the 2001 World Women's Handball Championship.
