= Martinique women's national handball team =

Martinique

Information
- Association: Ligue de Handball de Martinique

Colours
1st	2nd

Results

Nor.Ca. Championship
- Appearances: 1 (First in 2015)
- Best result: 6th (2015)
- Last updated on Unknown.

The Martinique women's national handball team is the national handball team of Martinique.

== Nor.Ca. Championship record ==
- 2015 – 6th place
