= 1999 Pan American Women's Handball Championship =

Tournament details
- Host country: Argentina
- Venue(s): 1 (in 1 host city)
- Dates: 30 March – 3 April
- Teams: 6 (from 1 confederation)

Final positions
- Champions: Brazil (2nd title)
- Runners-up: Cuba
- Third place: Argentina
- Fourth place: Uruguay

Tournament statistics
- Matches played: 15
- Goals scored: 688 (45.87 per match)

The 1999 Pan American Women's Handball Championship was the fifth edition of the Pan American Women's Handball Championship, held in Buenos Aires, Argentina from 30 March to 3 April 1999. It acted as the American qualifying tournament for the 1999 World Women's Handball Championship.

== Standings ==
Team	Pld	W	D	L	GF	GA	GD	Pts
Brazil	5	5	0	0	148	80	+68	10
Cuba	5	3	1	1	140	93	+47	7
Argentina (H)	5	3	1	1	126	93	+33	7
Uruguay	5	2	0	3	114	86	+28	4
Greenland	5	1	0	4	102	110	−8	2
Colombia	5	0	0	5	58	226	−168	0

(H) Hosts

== Results ==
30 March 1999; 16:00	Uruguay	15–8	Greenland	CeNARD, Buenos Aires; Referees: Tchara, Fromento (ARG)
30 March 1999; 16:00	Jose Del Campo (6)	(7–4)	Grødem (4)	CeNARD, Buenos Aires; Referees: Tchara, Fromento (ARG)

30 March 1999	Brazil	25–22	Cuba

30 March 1999	Argentina	38–15	Colombia

31 March 1999	Brazil	51–9	Colombia
31 March 1999		(26–3)

31 March 1999	Cuba	21–18	Uruguay
31 March 1999		(7–9)

31 March 1999	Argentina	31–17	Greenland	CeNARD, Buenos Aires; Referees: Romero, Gonzales (URU)
31 March 1999	Nieues (10)	(16–9)	Jensen & Kyed (each 5)	CeNARD, Buenos Aires; Referees: Romero, Gonzales (URU)

1 April 1999	Cuba	55–9	Colombia
1 April 1999		(26–6)

1 April 1999	Brazil	24–17	Greenland	CeNARD, Buenos Aires; Referees: Tchara, Fromento (ARG)
1 April 1999	de Silva (9)	(10–10)	Hansen & Jensen (each 5)	CeNARD, Buenos Aires; Referees: Tchara, Fromento (ARG)

1 April 1999	Argentina	22–21	Uruguay
1 April 1999		(11–10)

2 April 1999	Uruguay	43–7	Colombia
2 April 1999		(18–3)

2 April 1999	Cuba	22–21	Greenland	CeNARD, Buenos Aires; Referees: Adenilson, Carvalho (BRA)
2 April 1999	Dùran (10)	(15–9)	Grødem (6)	CeNARD, Buenos Aires; Referees: Adenilson, Carvalho (BRA)

2 April 1999	Brazil	20–15	Argentina

3 April 1999	Greenland	39–18	Colombia	CeNARD, Buenos Aires
3 April 1999	4 players (6)	(19–8)		CeNARD, Buenos Aires

3 April 1999	Brazil	28–17	Uruguay
3 April 1999		(17–8)

3 April 1999	Cuba	20–20	Argentina

Games of Greenland

== Final ranking ==
Qualified for the 1999 World Championship

Rank	Team
Gold medal	Brazil
Silver medal	Cuba
Bronze medal	Argentina
4	Uruguay
5	Greenland
6	Colombia
