= Ayliny Martínez =

Cuban handball player (born 1979)

Personal information
- Full name: Ayliny Martínez Duanis
- Nationality: Cuban
- Born: April 12, 1979 (age 47)
- Height: 170 cm (67 in)

Sport
- Sport: Handball

Senior clubs
- Years: Team
- –: Habana
National team
- Years: Team
- –: Cuba

Ayliny Martínez Duanis (born 12 April 1979) is a team handball player from Cuba. She has played on the Cuba women's national handball team, and participated at the 2011 World Women's Handball Championship in Brazil.
