= 2019 Nor.Ca. Women's Handball Championship =

Tournament details
- Host country: Mexico
- Venue(s): 1 (in 1 host city)
- Dates: 28 May – 2 June
- Teams: 7 (from 1 confederation)

Final positions
- Champions: Cuba (2nd title)
- Runners-up: Puerto Rico
- Third place: Greenland
- Fourth place: Dominican Republic

Tournament statistics
- Matches played: 15
- Goals scored: 807 (53.8 per match)

The 2019 Nor.Ca. Women's Handball Championship was the third edition of the Nor.Ca. Women's Handball Championship. The tournament took place in Mexico City from 28 May to 2 June 2019. It acted as the North American and Caribbean qualifying tournament for the 2019 World Women's Handball Championship.

== Draw ==
The draw took place on 14 April 2019.

=== Seeding ===
Pot 1	Pot 2	Pot 3	Pot 4
Dominican Republic; United States	Cuba; Puerto Rico	Canada; Mexico	Greenland

== Preliminary round ==
All times are local (UTC−6).

=== Group A ===
Pos	Team	Pld	W	D	L	GF	GA	GD	Pts	Qualification
1	Puerto Rico	2	2	0	0	59	52	+7	4	Semifinals
2	Dominican Republic	2	1	0	1	56	57	−1	2	Semifinals
3	Mexico (H)	2	0	0	2	68	74	−6	0	

Rules for classification: 1) points; 2) head-to-head points; 3) head-to-head goal difference; 4) head-to-head number of goals scored; 5) goal difference.
(H) Hosts

28 May 2019; 18:00	Dominican Republic	38–34	Mexico	Centro Deportivo Olímpico Mexicano, Mexico City
28 May 2019; 18:00		(20–13)		Centro Deportivo Olímpico Mexicano, Mexico City

29 May 2019; 18:00	Puerto Rico	36–34	Mexico	Centro Deportivo Olímpico Mexicano, Mexico City
29 May 2019; 18:00		(17–17)		Centro Deportivo Olímpico Mexicano, Mexico City

30 May 2019; 18:00	Dominican Republic	18–23	Puerto Rico	Centro Deportivo Olímpico Mexicano, Mexico City
30 May 2019; 18:00		(9–9)		Centro Deportivo Olímpico Mexicano, Mexico City

=== Group B ===
Pos	Team	Pld	W	D	L	GF	GA	GD	Pts	Qualification
1	Cuba	3	3	0	0	82	55	+27	6	Semifinals
2	Greenland	3	1	1	1	84	68	+16	3 (Note: United States 22–22 Greenland)	Semifinals
3	United States	3	1	1	1	85	70	+15	3	
4	Canada	3	0	0	3	59	117	−58	0	

Rules for classification: 1) points; 2) head-to-head points; 3) head-to-head goal difference; 4) head-to-head number of goals scored; 5) goal difference.
Notes:

28 May 2019; 14:00	United States	22–22	Greenland	Centro Deportivo Olímpico Mexicano, Mexico City
28 May 2019; 14:00		(10–9)		Centro Deportivo Olímpico Mexicano, Mexico City

28 May 2019; 16:00	Cuba	30–17	Canada	Centro Deportivo Olímpico Mexicano, Mexico City
28 May 2019; 16:00		(16–7)		Centro Deportivo Olímpico Mexicano, Mexico City

29 May 2019; 14:00	Canada	21–42	United States	Centro Deportivo Olímpico Mexicano, Mexico City
29 May 2019; 14:00		(12–22)		Centro Deportivo Olímpico Mexicano, Mexico City

29 May 2019; 16:00	Greenland	17–25	Cuba	Centro Deportivo Olímpico Mexicano, Mexico City
29 May 2019; 16:00		(11–12)		Centro Deportivo Olímpico Mexicano, Mexico City

30 May 2019; 14:00	Canada	21–45	Greenland	Centro Deportivo Olímpico Mexicano, Mexico City
30 May 2019; 14:00		(10–26)		Centro Deportivo Olímpico Mexicano, Mexico City

30 May 2019; 16:00	United States	21–27	Cuba	Centro Deportivo Olímpico Mexicano, Mexico City
30 May 2019; 16:00		(11–12)		Centro Deportivo Olímpico Mexicano, Mexico City

== Knockout stage ==
=== Bracket ===
Semifinals
1 June
Puerto Rico	29
Greenland	25
1 June
Cuba	30
Dominican Republic	23

Final
2 June
Puerto Rico	24
Cuba	27
Third place game
2 June
Greenland	22
Dominican Republic	20

=== Placement matches ===
1 June 2019; 14:00	Mexico	30–24	Canada	Centro Deportivo Olímpico Mexicano, Mexico City
1 June 2019; 14:00		(16–10)		Centro Deportivo Olímpico Mexicano, Mexico City

2 June 2019; 14:00	United States	33–27	Mexico	Centro Deportivo Olímpico Mexicano, Mexico City
2 June 2019; 14:00		(17–18)		Centro Deportivo Olímpico Mexicano, Mexico City

=== Semifinals ===
1 June 2019; 16:00	Puerto Rico	29–25	Greenland	Centro Deportivo Olímpico Mexicano, Mexico City
1 June 2019; 16:00		(11–12)		Centro Deportivo Olímpico Mexicano, Mexico City

1 June 2019; 18:00	Cuba	30–23	Dominican Republic	Centro Deportivo Olímpico Mexicano, Mexico City
1 June 2019; 18:00		(11–10)		Centro Deportivo Olímpico Mexicano, Mexico City

=== Third place game ===
2 June 2019; 16:00	Greenland	22–20	Dominican Republic	Centro Deportivo Olímpico Mexicano, Mexico City
2 June 2019; 16:00		(14–10)		Centro Deportivo Olímpico Mexicano, Mexico City

=== Final ===
2 June 2019; 16:00	Puerto Rico	24–27	Cuba	Centro Deportivo Olímpico Mexicano, Mexico City
2 June 2019; 16:00		(15–14)		Centro Deportivo Olímpico Mexicano, Mexico City

== Final standing ==
Rank	Team
1st place, gold medalist(s)	Cuba
2nd place, silver medalist(s)	Puerto Rico
3rd place, bronze medalist(s)	Greenland
4	Dominican Republic
5	United States
6	Mexico
7	Canada

Team qualified for the 2019 World Women's Handball Championship
