= Gleinys Reyes =

Cuban handball player (born 1989)

Gleinys Reyes González
Personal information
- Born: 31 July 1989 (age 37) Granma Province, Cuba
- Height: 1.71 m (5 ft 7 in)

Sport
- Sport: Handball
- Position: Right back
- Current club: Balonmano Zonzamas

Senior clubs
- Years: Team
- –: Granma
- 2018–2019: BM Remudas
- 2019–: Balonmano Zonzamas
National team
Years	Team	Apps	(Gls)
–	Cuba	43	(123)
Medal record
Pan American Games
Bronze medal – third place	2019 Lima	Team
Pan American Championship
Silver medal – second place	2015 Cuba
Central American and Caribbean Games
Gold medal – first place	2023 San Salvador	Team
Nor.Ca. Championship
Gold medal – first place	2015 Puerto Rico

Gleinys Reyes González (born 31 July 1989) is a Cuban handball player for Adesal Cordoba and the Cuban national team.

She competed at the 2015 World Women's Handball Championship in Denmark.

== Individual awards and achievements ==
- 2015 Nor.Ca. Women's Handball Championship: Top Scorer
- 2015 Pan American Women's Handball Championship: Top Scorer
- 2015 Pan American Women's Handball Championship: All Star Team Right Wing
