= Greenland women's national handball team =

Greenland

Information
- Association: Greenland Handball Federation
- Coach: Mikkel Bom

Colours
1st	2nd

Results

World Championship
- Appearances: 2
- Best result: 24th (2001)

Pan American Championship
- Appearances: 3 (First in Nor.Ca. Championship)
- Best result: 1st (2023)
- Last updated on Unknown.

Greenland women's national handball team
Medal record

Nor.Ca. Handball Championship
Gold medal – first place	2023 Greenland	
Silver medal – second place	2021 United States	
Bronze medal – third place	2019 Mexico	

The Greenland women's national handball team is the national team of Greenland managed by the Greenland Handball Federation. It takes part in international handball competitions.

The team participated in the 2001 World Women's Handball Championship in Italy and the 2023 World Women's Handball Championship in Norway.

== History ==
After the Greenland Handball Federation was recognized by the International Handball Federation as independent member in 1998, they played their first game against the Icelandic national team on 27 December 1998.

== Results ==
=== World Championship ===
Year	Round	Position	GP	W	D*	L	GS	GA
(Italy) 2001	Group stage	24th	5	0	0	5	77	152
(Denmark) (Norway) (Sweden) 2023	Group stage	32nd	7	0	0	7	130	231
Total	1/26	0 titles	12	0	0	12	207	383

=== Pan American Championship ===
Year	Round	Position	GP	W	D*	L	GS	GA
(Argentina) 1999	round robin	5th	5	1	0	4	102	110
(Brazil) 2000	round robin	3rd	5	3	0	2	123	120
(Cuba) 2015	5th place match	6th	7	2	1	4	150	176
Total	3/12	0 titles	17	6	1	10	375	406

=== Nor. Ca. Championship ===
Year	Round	Position	GP	W	D*	L	GS	GA
(Puerto Rico) 2015	Bronze Medal Match	4th	6	2	2	2	142	150
(Puerto Rico) 2017	Bronze Medal Match	4th	5	0	0	5	117	134
(Mexico) 2019	Bronze Medal Match	3rd	5	2	1	2	131	117
(United States) 2021	Final	2nd	4	3	0	1	111	102
(Greenland) 2023	Final	1st	5	5	0	0	123	87
Total	5/5	1 title	25	12	3	10	624	590

== Team ==
=== Current squad ===
Roster for the 2023 World Women's Handball Championship.

Head coach: Anders Friis

No.	Pos.	Name	Date of birth (age)	Height	App.	Goals	Club
2	RW	Nuunu Lukassen	6 November 1999 (age 26)	1.64 m	9	18	(Denmark) Ejstrup/Hærvejen
3	LW	Andrea Heilmann	21 February 1988 (age 37)	1.64 m	20	8	(Greenland) GSS Nuuk
4	RW	Anja Heilmann	5 January 1997 (age 29)	1.74 m	34	97	(Greenland) GSS Nuuk
5	P	Ivâna Meincke	7 August 1995 (age 30)	1.68 m	10	15	(Iceland) Stjarnan
7	LW	Aviana Kâjangmat	25 February 2000 (age 25)	1.68 m	4	16	(Denmark) Silkeborg-Voel KFUM 2
8	RW	Ane-Sofiannguaq Frederiksen	25 October 2001 (age 24)	1.65 m	5	5	(Denmark) Silkeborg-Voel KFUM 2
10	RB	Josefine Gadgaard	12 July 1994 (age 31)	1.69 m	11	28	(Denmark) Ejstrup/Hærvejen
12	GK	Nivi Fly	3 August 1989 (age 36)	1.69 m	20	0	(Greenland) GSS Nuuk
13	LB	Ivalu Bjerge	13 September 2000 (age 25)	1.71 m	14	37	(Denmark) NSK Håndbold
14	LB	Nivi Petersen	22 April 2000 (age 25)	1.71 m	5	5	(Denmark) Silkeborg-Voel KFUM 2
15	P	Sandra Rothberg	1 December 2000 (age 25)	1.86 m	14	32	(Greenland) GSS Nuuk
16	GK	Rina Møller Lorentzen	16 February 1991 (age 34)	1.82 m	19	0	(Greenland) GSS Nuuk
17	LB	Lykke Frank Hansen	8 January 1988 (age 38)	1.80 m	24	37	(Denmark) Fredericia HK
18	GK	Aviaja Heilmann	26 January 1989 (age 37)	1.66 m	24	0	(Greenland) GSS Nuuk
19	P	Nukaaka Lyberth	25 March 2001 (age 24)	1.68 m	5	6	(Faroe Islands) Eiðis Bóltfelag
21	LB	Aili Pedersen	27 January 1993 (age 33)	1.84 m	6	1	(Greenland) GSS Nuuk
26	P	Ivaana Holm	16 July 1990 (age 35)	1.70 m	21	24	(Greenland) GSS Nuuk
79	LW	Sascha Jordening Zeeb	31 October 1990 (age 35)	1.70 m	10	15	(Greenland) GSS Nuuk

=== Coaches ===
First	Last	Nat.	Name
27 December 1998	3 April 1999		Kim Mandrup
31 October 2000 *1)	?	Denmark	Jan Laugesen
2011	2016	Denmark	Jakob Andreasen
2016	2021	Greenland	Johannes Groth
2021	2024	Denmark	Anders Friis
2024		Denmark	Mikkel Bom

*1) He already started in 1999 with coaching but his first game was in 2000
