= 2015 Nor.Ca. Women's Handball Championship =

Tournament details
- Host country: Puerto Rico
- Venue(s): 1 (in 1 host city)
- Dates: 24–28 March
- Teams: 6 (from 1 confederation)

Final positions
- Champions: Cuba (1st title)
- Runners-up: Mexico
- Third place: United States
- Fourth place: Greenland

Tournament statistics
- Matches played: 18
- Goals scored: 935 (51.94 per match)
- Top scorer(s): Gleinys Reyes (CUB) (40 goals)

The 2015 Nor.Ca. Women's Handball Championship was the first edition of the Nor.Ca. Women's Handball Championship, which took place in Salinas, Puerto Rico from 30 March to 5 April 2015. It acted as the North America e Caribbean qualifying tournament for the 2015 Pan American Women's Handball Championship.

== Participating teams ==
- Cuba
- Greenland
- Martinique
- Mexico
- Puerto Rico
- United States

== Preliminary round ==
All times are local (UTC−4).

Team	Pld	W	D	L	GF	GA	GD	Pts
Cuba	5	5	0	0	181	90	+91	10
Mexico	5	3	1	1	131	126	+5	7
Greenland	5	2	2	1	119	123	−4	6
United States	5	2	1	2	124	142	−18	5
Martinique	5	0	1	4	106	136	−30	1
Puerto Rico	5	0	1	4	120	164	−44	1

Team qualified to the gold medal match
Team qualified to the bronze medal match

30 March 2015; 16:00	United States	26–26	Greenland	Albergue Olimpico, Salinas
30 March 2015; 16:00	Van Ryn 8	(15–15)	Hansen 9	Albergue Olimpico, Salinas
30 March 2015; 16:00	2× (yellow card) 1× (suspension)	Report	2× (yellow card) 5× (suspension)	Albergue Olimpico, Salinas

30 March 2015; 18:00	Mexico	33–25	Martinique	Albergue Olimpico, Salinas
30 March 2015; 18:00	Rocha, Zavala 6	(14–9)	Liroy, Bivard 6	Albergue Olimpico, Salinas
30 March 2015; 18:00	1× (yellow card) 4× (suspension)	Report	3× (yellow card) 11× (suspension) 2× (red card)	Albergue Olimpico, Salinas

30 March 2015; 20:00	Puerto Rico	15–52	Cuba	Albergue Olimpico, Salinas
30 March 2015; 20:00	Hiraldo 4	(11–23)	Camejo 12	Albergue Olimpico, Salinas
30 March 2015; 20:00	3× (yellow card) 5× (suspension)	Report	3× (yellow card) 8× (suspension) 1× (red card)	Albergue Olimpico, Salinas

31 March 2015; 16:00	Greenland	20–20	Mexico	Albergue Olimpico, Salinas
31 March 2015; 16:00	Rasmussen 6	(7–10)	Saavedra 6	Albergue Olimpico, Salinas
31 March 2015; 16:00	2× (yellow card) 3× (suspension)	Report	3× (yellow card) 1× (suspension)	Albergue Olimpico, Salinas

31 March 2015; 18:00	Cuba	35–15	United States	Albergue Olimpico, Salinas
31 March 2015; 18:00	Lusson 12	(18–7)	Gascon 5	Albergue Olimpico, Salinas
31 March 2015; 18:00	2× (yellow card) 4× (suspension)	Report	2× (yellow card) 6× (suspension)	Albergue Olimpico, Salinas

31 March 2015; 20:00	Martinique	24–24	Puerto Rico	Albergue Olimpico, Salinas
31 March 2015; 20:00	Jean-Philippe 7	(14–16)	Ceballos 5	Albergue Olimpico, Salinas
31 March 2015; 20:00	3× (yellow card) 6× (suspension)	Report	2× (yellow card) 5× (suspension)	Albergue Olimpico, Salinas

1 April 2015; 16:00	Cuba	33–17	Martinique	Albergue Olimpico, Salinas
1 April 2015; 16:00	Reyes 7	(18–9)	Jean-Philippe 5	Albergue Olimpico, Salinas
1 April 2015; 16:00	2× (yellow card) 4× (suspension)	Report	3× (yellow card) 1× (suspension)	Albergue Olimpico, Salinas

1 April 2015; 18:00	Mexico	31–26	United States	Albergue Olimpico, Salinas
1 April 2015; 18:00	Aguirre, Saavedra 6	(18–16)	Gascon 5	Albergue Olimpico, Salinas
1 April 2015; 18:00	1× (suspension)	Report	2× (yellow card) 6× (suspension) 1× (red card)	Albergue Olimpico, Salinas

1 April 2015; 20:00	Greenland	27–26	Puerto Rico	Albergue Olimpico, Salinas
1 April 2015; 20:00	Lyberth 6	(13–12)	Hiraldo 8	Albergue Olimpico, Salinas
1 April 2015; 20:00	1× (suspension)	Report	2× (yellow card) 6× (suspension)	Albergue Olimpico, Salinas

2 April 2015; 16:00	Cuba	29–19	Mexico	Albergue Olimpico, Salinas
2 April 2015; 16:00	Reyes 11	(16–12)	Aguirre 6	Albergue Olimpico, Salinas
2 April 2015; 16:00	2× (yellow card) 6× (suspension) 1× (red card)	Report	1× (yellow card) 3× (suspension)	Albergue Olimpico, Salinas

2 April 2015; 18:00	Martinique	19–22	Greenland	Albergue Olimpico, Salinas
2 April 2015; 18:00	Zide 6	(10–11)	Rasmussen 7	Albergue Olimpico, Salinas
2 April 2015; 18:00	3× (yellow card) 5× (suspension)	Report	1× (yellow card) 2× (suspension)	Albergue Olimpico, Salinas

2 April 2015; 20:00	Puerto Rico	29–33	United States	Albergue Olimpico, Salinas
2 April 2015; 20:00	Ceballos, Hiraldo 7	(15–19)	Taylor 9	Albergue Olimpico, Salinas
2 April 2015; 20:00	2× (yellow card) 3× (suspension)	Report	3× (yellow card) 2× (suspension)	Albergue Olimpico, Salinas

4 April 2015; 13:00	Greenland	24–32	Cuba	Puerto Rico Convention Center, San Juan
4 April 2015; 13:00	Rasmussen 9	(8–18)	Ramirez 10	Puerto Rico Convention Center, San Juan
4 April 2015; 13:00	2× (yellow card) 1× (suspension)	Report	1× (yellow card) 1× (suspension)	Puerto Rico Convention Center, San Juan

4 April 2015; 15:00	United States	24–21	Martinique	Puerto Rico Convention Center, San Juan
4 April 2015; 15:00	Taylor, Hartnett 5	(11–11)	Jaune 6	Puerto Rico Convention Center, San Juan
4 April 2015; 15:00	3× (yellow card) 2× (suspension)	Report	1× (yellow card) 4× (suspension)	Puerto Rico Convention Center, San Juan

4 April 2015; 17:00	Mexico	28–26	Puerto Rico	Puerto Rico Convention Center, San Juan
4 April 2015; 17:00	Jaramillo 8	(14–14)	García 7	Puerto Rico Convention Center, San Juan
4 April 2015; 17:00	1× (yellow card) 7× (suspension) 1× (red card)	Report	3× (yellow card) 5× (suspension)	Puerto Rico Convention Center, San Juan

== Final round ==
=== Fifth place game ===
5 April 2015; 15:00	Martinique	18–27	Puerto Rico	Puerto Rico Convention Center, San Juan
5 April 2015; 15:00	Bivard, Jean-Philippe 4	(10–10)	Pope 7	Puerto Rico Convention Center, San Juan
5 April 2015; 15:00	3× (yellow card) 8× (suspension)	Report	3× (yellow card) 5× (suspension)	Puerto Rico Convention Center, San Juan

=== Third place game ===
5 April 2015; 13:00	Greenland	23–27	United States	Puerto Rico Convention Center, San Juan
5 April 2015; 13:00	Lyberth 5	(14–10)	Darling 9	Puerto Rico Convention Center, San Juan
5 April 2015; 13:00	3× (yellow card) 1× (suspension)	Report	3× (yellow card) 3× (suspension)	Puerto Rico Convention Center, San Juan

=== Final ===
5 April 2015; 17:00	Cuba	34–25	Mexico	Puerto Rico Convention Center, San Juan
5 April 2015; 17:00	Camejo 7	(18–11)	Jaramillo 6	Puerto Rico Convention Center, San Juan
5 April 2015; 17:00	2× (yellow card) 2× (suspension)	Report	3× (yellow card) 2× (suspension)	Puerto Rico Convention Center, San Juan

== Final standing ==
Rank	Team
Gold medal	Cuba
Silver medal	Mexico
Bronze medal	United States
4	Greenland
5	Puerto Rico
6	Martinique

Team qualified to the 2015 Pan American Women's Handball Championship
