= 2015 Pan American Women's Handball Championship =

Tournament details
- Host country: Cuba
- Venue: 1 (in 1 host city)
- Dates: 21–28 May
- Teams: 12 (from 1 confederation)

Final positions
- Champions: Brazil (9th title)
- Runners-up: Cuba
- Third place: Argentina
- Fourth place: Puerto Rico

Tournament statistics
- Matches played: 42
- Goals scored: 2,188 (52.1 per match)
- Top scorers: (Cuba) Gleinys Reyes (54 goals)

The 2015 Pan American Women's Handball Championship was the 13th edition of the Pan American Women's Handball Championship, held in Cuba from 21 to 28 May 2015. It acted as the American qualifying tournament for the 2015 World Women's Handball Championship.

== Preliminary round ==
The draw was held on 25 April 2015.

All times are local (UTC−4).

=== Group A ===
Pos	Team	Pld	W	D	L	GF	GA	GD	Pts	Qualification
1	Brazil	5	5	0	0	156	79	+77	10	Advance to semifinals
2	Puerto Rico	5	3	1	1	123	135	−12	7	Advance to semifinals
3	Paraguay	5	3	0	2	132	129	+3	6	
4	Greenland	5	1	1	3	110	132	−22	3	
5	United States	5	1	0	4	102	124	−22	2 (Note: Venezuela–United States 20–22)	
6	Venezuela	5	0	2	3	113	137	−24	2	

Source: panamhandball.org
Rules for classification: 1) points; 2) head-to-head points; 3) head-to-head goal difference; 4) head-to-head number of goals scored; 5) Goal difference.
Notes:

21 May 2015; 09:00	Venezuela	25–25	Puerto Rico	Sala Polivalente Kid Chocolate, Havana; Referees: González, Prieto (URU)
21 May 2015; 09:00	Barinas 7	(10–13)	Fuentes 7	Sala Polivalente Kid Chocolate, Havana; Referees: González, Prieto (URU)
21 May 2015; 09:00	2× (yellow card) 5× (suspension)	Report	3× (yellow card) 1× (suspension)	Sala Polivalente Kid Chocolate, Havana; Referees: González, Prieto (URU)

21 May 2015; 11:00	Paraguay	25–18	Greenland	Sala Polivalente Kid Chocolate, Havana; Referees: Sosa, Lemes (URU)
21 May 2015; 11:00	Aluan 9	(9–10)	Rasmussen 6	Sala Polivalente Kid Chocolate, Havana; Referees: Sosa, Lemes (URU)
21 May 2015; 11:00	2× (yellow card) 2× (suspension)	Report	3× (yellow card) 3× (suspension)	Sala Polivalente Kid Chocolate, Havana; Referees: Sosa, Lemes (URU)

21 May 2015; 13:00	Brazil	28–14	United States	Sala Polivalente Kid Chocolate, Havana; Attendance: 200; Referees: Reyes, Zuñiga (CUB)
21 May 2015; 13:00	Piedade, Constantino 4	(13–9)	Borg 5	Sala Polivalente Kid Chocolate, Havana; Attendance: 200; Referees: Reyes, Zuñiga (CUB)
21 May 2015; 13:00	3× (yellow card) 1× (suspension)	Report	3× (yellow card) 1× (suspension)	Sala Polivalente Kid Chocolate, Havana; Attendance: 200; Referees: Reyes, Zuñiga (CUB)

22 May 2015; 09:00	Greenland	26–26	Venezuela	Sala Polivalente Kid Chocolate, Havana; Attendance: 150; Referees: Sosa, Lemes (URU)
22 May 2015; 09:00	Rasmussen 9	(13–10)	Barinas 12	Sala Polivalente Kid Chocolate, Havana; Attendance: 150; Referees: Sosa, Lemes (URU)
22 May 2015; 09:00	3× (yellow card) 4× (suspension)	Report	3× (yellow card) 5× (suspension)	Sala Polivalente Kid Chocolate, Havana; Attendance: 150; Referees: Sosa, Lemes (URU)

22 May 2015; 11:00	United States	24–25	Paraguay	Sala Polivalente Kid Chocolate, Havana; Attendance: 150; Referees: González, Prieto (URU)
22 May 2015; 11:00	Borg 10	(12–11)	Martínez 7	Sala Polivalente Kid Chocolate, Havana; Attendance: 150; Referees: González, Prieto (URU)
22 May 2015; 11:00	3× (yellow card) 4× (suspension)	Report	3× (yellow card) 1× (suspension)	Sala Polivalente Kid Chocolate, Havana; Attendance: 150; Referees: González, Prieto (URU)

22 May 2015; 15:00	Puerto Rico	15–35	Brazil	Sala Polivalente Kid Chocolate, Havana; Referees: Paolantoni, Zanikian (ARG)
22 May 2015; 15:00	Natal 5	(7–16)	Quintino 10	Sala Polivalente Kid Chocolate, Havana; Referees: Paolantoni, Zanikian (ARG)
22 May 2015; 15:00	3× (yellow card) 6× (suspension) 1× (red card)	Report	2× (yellow card) 7× (suspension) 1× (red card)	Sala Polivalente Kid Chocolate, Havana; Referees: Paolantoni, Zanikian (ARG)

23 May 2015; 09:00	Brazil	32–12	Greenland	Sala Polivalente Kid Chocolate, Havana; Attendance: 200; Referees: González, Prieto (URU)
23 May 2015; 09:00	S. Rocha 6	(18–6)	three players 3	Sala Polivalente Kid Chocolate, Havana; Attendance: 200; Referees: González, Prieto (URU)
23 May 2015; 09:00	2× (yellow card)	Report	1× (yellow card)	Sala Polivalente Kid Chocolate, Havana; Attendance: 200; Referees: González, Prieto (URU)

23 May 2015; 11:00	Paraguay	31–26	Venezuela	Sala Polivalente Kid Chocolate, Havana; Referees: Reyes, Zuñiga (CUB)
23 May 2015; 11:00	Martínez 13	(14–10)	Barinas 7	Sala Polivalente Kid Chocolate, Havana; Referees: Reyes, Zuñiga (CUB)
23 May 2015; 11:00	2× (yellow card) 3× (suspension)	Report	3× (yellow card) 7× (suspension)	Sala Polivalente Kid Chocolate, Havana; Referees: Reyes, Zuñiga (CUB)

23 May 2015; 13:00	United States	20–23	Puerto Rico	Sala Polivalente Kid Chocolate, Havana; Attendance: 150; Referees: Lenci, López (ARG)
23 May 2015; 13:00	Borg 7	(8–9)	Ceballos 9	Sala Polivalente Kid Chocolate, Havana; Attendance: 150; Referees: Lenci, López (ARG)
23 May 2015; 13:00	3× (yellow card) 2× (suspension)	Report	1× (yellow card) 4× (suspension)	Sala Polivalente Kid Chocolate, Havana; Attendance: 150; Referees: Lenci, López (ARG)

24 May 2015; 09:00	Paraguay	29–33	Puerto Rico	Sala Polivalente Kid Chocolate, Havana; Referees: Magalhães, Rocha (BRA)
24 May 2015; 09:00	Faría 6	(14–13)	Ceballos 10	Sala Polivalente Kid Chocolate, Havana; Referees: Magalhães, Rocha (BRA)
24 May 2015; 09:00	3× (yellow card) 2× (suspension)	Report	3× (yellow card) 2× (suspension)	Sala Polivalente Kid Chocolate, Havana; Referees: Magalhães, Rocha (BRA)

24 May 2015; 11:00	Greenland	28–22	United States	Sala Polivalente Kid Chocolate, Havana; Attendance: 150; Referees: Paolantoni, Zanikian (ARG)
24 May 2015; 11:00	Rasmussen 11	(14–14)	Borg, Van Ryn 5	Sala Polivalente Kid Chocolate, Havana; Attendance: 150; Referees: Paolantoni, Zanikian (ARG)
24 May 2015; 11:00	4× (yellow card) 3× (suspension)	Report	4× (yellow card) 3× (suspension)	Sala Polivalente Kid Chocolate, Havana; Attendance: 150; Referees: Paolantoni, Zanikian (ARG)

24 May 2015; 15:00	Venezuela	16–33	Brazil	Sala Polivalente Kid Chocolate, Havana; Referees: Zapata, Ojeda (COL)
24 May 2015; 15:00	Carbajal, Barinas 4	(8–16)	Coppi 9	Sala Polivalente Kid Chocolate, Havana; Referees: Zapata, Ojeda (COL)
24 May 2015; 15:00	1× (yellow card) 1× (suspension)	Report	2× (yellow card) 1× (suspension)	Sala Polivalente Kid Chocolate, Havana; Referees: Zapata, Ojeda (COL)

25 May 2015; 09:00	Puerto Rico	27–26	Greenland	Sala Polivalente Kid Chocolate, Havana; Referees: Reyes, Zuñiga (CUB)
25 May 2015; 09:00	Ceballos, Hiraldo 7	(11–13)	three players 7	Sala Polivalente Kid Chocolate, Havana; Referees: Reyes, Zuñiga (CUB)
25 May 2015; 09:00	1× (yellow card) 2× (suspension)	Report	3× (yellow card)	Sala Polivalente Kid Chocolate, Havana; Referees: Reyes, Zuñiga (CUB)

25 May 2015; 11:00	Venezuela	20–22	United States	Sala Polivalente Kid Chocolate, Havana; Referees: Lenci, López (ARG)
25 May 2015; 11:00	Barinas 9	(10–8)	Taylor 7	Sala Polivalente Kid Chocolate, Havana; Referees: Lenci, López (ARG)
25 May 2015; 11:00	2× (yellow card) 2× (suspension)	Report	2× (yellow card) 3× (suspension)	Sala Polivalente Kid Chocolate, Havana; Referees: Lenci, López (ARG)

25 May 2015; 13:00	Brazil	28–22	Paraguay	Sala Polivalente Kid Chocolate, Havana; Attendance: 230; Referees: Sosa, Lemes (URU)
25 May 2015; 13:00	Coppi 6	(14–12)	Faría 7	Sala Polivalente Kid Chocolate, Havana; Attendance: 230; Referees: Sosa, Lemes (URU)
25 May 2015; 13:00	4× (yellow card) 7× (suspension)	Report	3× (yellow card)	Sala Polivalente Kid Chocolate, Havana; Attendance: 230; Referees: Sosa, Lemes (URU)

=== Group B ===
Pos	Team	Pld	W	D	L	GF	GA	GD	Pts	Qualification
1	Cuba (H)	5	5	0	0	192	100	+92	10	Advance to semifinals
2	Argentina	5	4	0	1	172	88	+84	8	Advance to semifinals
3	Mexico	5	2	1	2	145	149	−4	5 (Note: Uruguay–Mexico 37–37)	
4	Uruguay	5	2	1	2	142	156	−14	5	
5	Chile	5	1	0	4	133	149	−16	2	
6	Guatemala	5	0	0	5	66	208	−142	0	

Source: panamhandball.org
Rules for classification: 1) points; 2) head-to-head points; 3) head-to-head goal difference; 4) head-to-head number of goals scored; 5) Goal difference.
(H) Hosts
Notes:

21 May 2015; 15:00	Uruguay	29–27	Chile	Sala Polivalente Kid Chocolate, Havana; Referees: Arntsen, Røen (NOR)
21 May 2015; 15:00	M. Barreiro 12	(13–13)	Musalen 7	Sala Polivalente Kid Chocolate, Havana; Referees: Arntsen, Røen (NOR)
21 May 2015; 15:00	2× (yellow card) 4× (suspension)	Report	3× (yellow card) 8× (suspension)	Sala Polivalente Kid Chocolate, Havana; Referees: Arntsen, Røen (NOR)

21 May 2015; 18:30	Argentina	23–24	Cuba	Sala Polivalente Kid Chocolate, Havana; Attendance: 1,500; Referees: Magalhães, Rocha (BRA)
21 May 2015; 18:30	Pizzo 6	(10–15)	Rizo 9	Sala Polivalente Kid Chocolate, Havana; Attendance: 1,500; Referees: Magalhães, Rocha (BRA)
21 May 2015; 18:30	3× (yellow card) 4× (suspension)	Report	3× (yellow card) 6× (suspension)	Sala Polivalente Kid Chocolate, Havana; Attendance: 1,500; Referees: Magalhães, Rocha (BRA)

21 May 2015; 20:30	Mexico	35–15	Guatemala	Sala Polivalente Kid Chocolate, Havana; Attendance: 250; Referees: Ojeda, Zapata (COL)
21 May 2015; 20:30	four players 4	(17–6)	Sosa 4	Sala Polivalente Kid Chocolate, Havana; Attendance: 250; Referees: Ojeda, Zapata (COL)
21 May 2015; 20:30	3× (yellow card) 2× (suspension)	Report	3× (yellow card) 4× (suspension)	Sala Polivalente Kid Chocolate, Havana; Attendance: 250; Referees: Ojeda, Zapata (COL)

22 May 2015; 13:00	Mexico	30–24	Chile	Sala Polivalente Kid Chocolate, Havana; Attendance: 300; Referees: Magalhães, Rocha (BRA)
22 May 2015; 13:00	Saavedra 7	(15–11)	Flores 5	Sala Polivalente Kid Chocolate, Havana; Attendance: 300; Referees: Magalhães, Rocha (BRA)
22 May 2015; 13:00	4× (yellow card) 2× (suspension)	Report	4× (yellow card) 6× (suspension)	Sala Polivalente Kid Chocolate, Havana; Attendance: 300; Referees: Magalhães, Rocha (BRA)

22 May 2015; 17:00	Argentina	48–6	Guatemala	Sala Polivalente Kid Chocolate, Havana; Referees: Ojeda, Zapata (COL)
22 May 2015; 17:00	Bianchi 10	(24–3)	Lavarreda 3	Sala Polivalente Kid Chocolate, Havana; Referees: Ojeda, Zapata (COL)
22 May 2015; 17:00	2× (yellow card)	Report	3× (yellow card) 3× (suspension)	Sala Polivalente Kid Chocolate, Havana; Referees: Ojeda, Zapata (COL)

22 May 2015; 19:00	Cuba	44–19	Uruguay	Sala Polivalente Kid Chocolate, Havana; Attendance: 300; Referees: Lenci, López (ARG)
22 May 2015; 19:00	Mesa 9	(18–10)	M. Barreiro 7	Sala Polivalente Kid Chocolate, Havana; Attendance: 300; Referees: Lenci, López (ARG)
22 May 2015; 19:00	2× (yellow card) 3× (suspension)	Report	2× (yellow card) 3× (suspension)	Sala Polivalente Kid Chocolate, Havana; Attendance: 300; Referees: Lenci, López (ARG)

23 May 2015; 15:00	Argentina	31–20	Chile	Sala Polivalente Kid Chocolate, Havana; Attendance: 300; Referees: Ojeda, Zapata (COL)
23 May 2015; 15:00	Campigli 7	(16–8)	Zavala 5	Sala Polivalente Kid Chocolate, Havana; Attendance: 300; Referees: Ojeda, Zapata (COL)
23 May 2015; 15:00	3× (yellow card) 4× (suspension)	Report	2× (yellow card) 5× (suspension)	Sala Polivalente Kid Chocolate, Havana; Attendance: 300; Referees: Ojeda, Zapata (COL)

23 May 2015; 17:00	Uruguay	37–37	Mexico	Sala Polivalente Kid Chocolate, Havana; Referees: Arntsen, Røen (NOR)
23 May 2015; 17:00	C. Barreiro 9	(20–16)	Aguierre 8	Sala Polivalente Kid Chocolate, Havana; Referees: Arntsen, Røen (NOR)
23 May 2015; 17:00	3× (yellow card) 3× (suspension)	Report	2× (yellow card) 1× (suspension)	Sala Polivalente Kid Chocolate, Havana; Referees: Arntsen, Røen (NOR)

23 May 2015; 19:00	Cuba	47–12	Guatemala	Sala Polivalente Kid Chocolate, Havana; Attendance: 500; Referees: Alaufsen, Sørensen (GRL)
23 May 2015; 19:00	Reyes 17	(22–6)	Lavarreda 5	Sala Polivalente Kid Chocolate, Havana; Attendance: 500; Referees: Alaufsen, Sørensen (GRL)
23 May 2015; 19:00	3× (yellow card) 3× (suspension)	Report	1× (yellow card) 3× (suspension)	Sala Polivalente Kid Chocolate, Havana; Attendance: 500; Referees: Alaufsen, Sørensen (GRL)

24 May 2015; 13:00	Mexico	23–36	Argentina	Sala Polivalente Kid Chocolate, Havana; Referees: Arntsen, Røen (NOR)
24 May 2015; 13:00	Aguierre, Saavedra 4	(8–20)	Pizzo 6	Sala Polivalente Kid Chocolate, Havana; Referees: Arntsen, Røen (NOR)
24 May 2015; 13:00	3× (yellow card) 3× (suspension)	Report	3× (yellow card) 2× (suspension)	Sala Polivalente Kid Chocolate, Havana; Referees: Arntsen, Røen (NOR)

24 May 2015; 17:00	Uruguay	42–14	Guatemala	Sala Polivalente Kid Chocolate, Havana; Referees: Reyes, Zuñiga (CUB)
24 May 2015; 17:00	M. Barreiro 7	(19–6)	Lavarreda, Herrera 4	Sala Polivalente Kid Chocolate, Havana; Referees: Reyes, Zuñiga (CUB)
24 May 2015; 17:00	3× (yellow card) 1× (suspension)	Report	3× (yellow card) 4× (suspension)	Sala Polivalente Kid Chocolate, Havana; Referees: Reyes, Zuñiga (CUB)

24 May 2015; 19:00	Chile	26–40	Cuba	Sala Polivalente Kid Chocolate, Havana; Referees: Lenci, López (ARG)
24 May 2015; 19:00	Llanos 7	(14–22)	Rizo 9	Sala Polivalente Kid Chocolate, Havana; Referees: Lenci, López (ARG)
24 May 2015; 19:00	3× (yellow card) 4× (suspension)	Report	3× (yellow card) 4× (suspension)	Sala Polivalente Kid Chocolate, Havana; Referees: Lenci, López (ARG)

25 May 2015; 15:00	Argentina	34–15	Uruguay	Sala Polivalente Kid Chocolate, Havana; Referees: Arntsen, Røen (NOR)
25 May 2015; 15:00	Campigli 7	(15–7)	three players 3	Sala Polivalente Kid Chocolate, Havana; Referees: Arntsen, Røen (NOR)
25 May 2015; 15:00	2× (yellow card)	Report	4× (yellow card) 4× (suspension)	Sala Polivalente Kid Chocolate, Havana; Referees: Arntsen, Røen (NOR)

25 May 2015; 17:00	Guatemala	19–36	Chile	Sala Polivalente Kid Chocolate, Havana; Referees: Alaufsen, Sørensen (GRL)
25 May 2015; 17:00	Herrera 4	(10–16)	Castañeda 8	Sala Polivalente Kid Chocolate, Havana; Referees: Alaufsen, Sørensen (GRL)
25 May 2015; 17:00	1× (yellow card) 3× (suspension)	Report	1× (yellow card) 1× (suspension)	Sala Polivalente Kid Chocolate, Havana; Referees: Alaufsen, Sørensen (GRL)

25 May 2015; 19:00	Mexico	20–37	Cuba	Sala Polivalente Kid Chocolate, Havana; Referees: Magalhães, Rocha (BRA)
25 May 2015; 19:00	Jaramillo, Favela 4	(11–21)	Reyes 12	Sala Polivalente Kid Chocolate, Havana; Referees: Magalhães, Rocha (BRA)
25 May 2015; 19:00	3× (yellow card) 1× (suspension)	Report	3× (yellow card) 3× (suspension)	Sala Polivalente Kid Chocolate, Havana; Referees: Magalhães, Rocha (BRA)

== Knockout stage ==
=== Bracket ===
Semifinals
Brazil	26
Argentina	15
Cuba	32
Puerto Rico	26

Final
Brazil	26
Cuba	22
Third place
Argentina	33
Puerto Rico	16

5–8th place bracket

5–8th place semifinals
Paraguay	23
Uruguay	28
Mexico	17
Greenland	19

Fifth place
Uruguay	27
Greenland	21
Seventh place
Paraguay	30
Mexico	24

9–12th place bracket

9–12th place semifinals
United States	37
Guatemala	16
Chile	35
Venezuela	28

Ninth place
United States	22
Chile	28
Eleventh place
Guatemala	19
Venezuela	32

All times are local (UTC−4).

=== 9–12th place semifinals ===
27 May 2015; 09:00	United States	37–16	Guatemala	Sala Polivalente Kid Chocolate, Havana; Referees: Lemes, Sosa (URU)
27 May 2015; 09:00	Darling 7	(18–9)	Lavarreda 5	Sala Polivalente Kid Chocolate, Havana; Referees: Lemes, Sosa (URU)
27 May 2015; 09:00		Report	2× (yellow card) 1× (suspension)	Sala Polivalente Kid Chocolate, Havana; Referees: Lemes, Sosa (URU)

27 May 2015; 11:00	Chile	35–28	Venezuela	Sala Polivalente Kid Chocolate, Havana; Attendance: 200; Referees: Ojeda, Zapata (COL)
27 May 2015; 11:00	Musalen 10	(14–15)	Barinas 9	Sala Polivalente Kid Chocolate, Havana; Attendance: 200; Referees: Ojeda, Zapata (COL)
27 May 2015; 11:00	2× (yellow card) 2× (suspension)	Report	3× (yellow card) 5× (suspension)	Sala Polivalente Kid Chocolate, Havana; Attendance: 200; Referees: Ojeda, Zapata (COL)

=== 5–8th place semifinals ===
27 May 2015; 13:00	Paraguay	23–28	Uruguay	Sala Polivalente Kid Chocolate, Havana; Attendance: 300; Referees: Magalhães, Rocha (BRA)
27 May 2015; 13:00	Faría 5	(12–13)	Scarrone 7	Sala Polivalente Kid Chocolate, Havana; Attendance: 300; Referees: Magalhães, Rocha (BRA)
27 May 2015; 13:00	1× (yellow card) 4× (suspension)	Report	2× (yellow card) 2× (suspension)	Sala Polivalente Kid Chocolate, Havana; Attendance: 300; Referees: Magalhães, Rocha (BRA)

27 May 2015; 17:00	Mexico	17–19	Greenland	Sala Polivalente Kid Chocolate, Havana; Attendance: 250; Referees: Paolantoni, Zanikian (ARG)
27 May 2015; 17:00	Aguierre 7	(8–9)	Heilmann 8	Sala Polivalente Kid Chocolate, Havana; Attendance: 250; Referees: Paolantoni, Zanikian (ARG)
27 May 2015; 17:00	1× (yellow card) 3× (suspension)	Report	3× (yellow card) 5× (suspension)	Sala Polivalente Kid Chocolate, Havana; Attendance: 250; Referees: Paolantoni, Zanikian (ARG)

=== Semifinals ===
27 May 2015; 15:00	Brazil	26–15	Argentina	Sala Polivalente Kid Chocolate, Havana; Attendance: 500; Referees: González, Prieto (URU)
27 May 2015; 15:00	Anastácio 6	(16–5)	Salvadó 4	Sala Polivalente Kid Chocolate, Havana; Attendance: 500; Referees: González, Prieto (URU)
27 May 2015; 15:00	3× (yellow card) 4× (suspension)	Report	2× (yellow card)	Sala Polivalente Kid Chocolate, Havana; Attendance: 500; Referees: González, Prieto (URU)

27 May 2015; 19:00	Cuba	32–26	Puerto Rico	Sala Polivalente Kid Chocolate, Havana; Attendance: 400; Referees: Arntsen, Røen (NOR)
27 May 2015; 19:00	Lusson, Reyes 7	(19–13)	García 7	Sala Polivalente Kid Chocolate, Havana; Attendance: 400; Referees: Arntsen, Røen (NOR)
27 May 2015; 19:00	1× (yellow card) 7× (suspension)	Report	1× (yellow card) 5× (suspension)	Sala Polivalente Kid Chocolate, Havana; Attendance: 400; Referees: Arntsen, Røen (NOR)

=== Eleventh place game ===
28 May 2015; 09:00	Guatemala	19–32	Venezuela	Sala Polivalente Kid Chocolate, Havana; Attendance: 150; Referees: Zapata, Ojeda (COL)
28 May 2015; 09:00	Gudiel 4	(8–13)	Cedeño 5	Sala Polivalente Kid Chocolate, Havana; Attendance: 150; Referees: Zapata, Ojeda (COL)
28 May 2015; 09:00	2× (yellow card) 4× (suspension)	Report	3× (yellow card) 3× (suspension)	Sala Polivalente Kid Chocolate, Havana; Attendance: 150; Referees: Zapata, Ojeda (COL)

=== Ninth place game ===
28 May 2015; 11:00	United States	22–28	Chile	Sala Polivalente Kid Chocolate, Havana; Attendance: 250; Referees: Paolantoni, Zanikian (ARG)
28 May 2015; 11:00	Gascon, Taylor 4	(6–11)	three players 4	Sala Polivalente Kid Chocolate, Havana; Attendance: 250; Referees: Paolantoni, Zanikian (ARG)
28 May 2015; 11:00	3× (yellow card) 4× (suspension)	Report	2× (yellow card) 3× (suspension)	Sala Polivalente Kid Chocolate, Havana; Attendance: 250; Referees: Paolantoni, Zanikian (ARG)

=== Seventh place game ===
28 May 2015; 13:00	Paraguay	30–24	Mexico	Sala Polivalente Kid Chocolate, Havana; Attendance: 245; Referees: González, Prieto (URU)
28 May 2015; 13:00	Sosa, Martínez 7	(15–12)	Zavala 5	Sala Polivalente Kid Chocolate, Havana; Attendance: 245; Referees: González, Prieto (URU)
28 May 2015; 13:00	3× (yellow card) 3× (suspension)	Report	1× (yellow card) 1× (suspension)	Sala Polivalente Kid Chocolate, Havana; Attendance: 245; Referees: González, Prieto (URU)

=== Fifth place game ===
28 May 2015; 17:00	Uruguay	27–21	Greenland	Sala Polivalente Kid Chocolate, Havana; Referees: Arntsen, Røen (NOR)
28 May 2015; 17:00	M. Barreiro 8	(11–12)	Heilmann 6	Sala Polivalente Kid Chocolate, Havana; Referees: Arntsen, Røen (NOR)
28 May 2015; 17:00	2× (yellow card) 4× (suspension)	Report	2× (yellow card) 3× (suspension)	Sala Polivalente Kid Chocolate, Havana; Referees: Arntsen, Røen (NOR)

=== Third place game ===
28 May 2015; 15:00	Argentina	33–16	Puerto Rico	Sala Polivalente Kid Chocolate, Havana; Attendance: 400; Referees: Reyes, Zuñiga (CUB)
28 May 2015; 15:00	Gambino 7	(14–8)	García 5	Sala Polivalente Kid Chocolate, Havana; Attendance: 400; Referees: Reyes, Zuñiga (CUB)
28 May 2015; 15:00	2× (yellow card) 1× (suspension)	Report	3× (yellow card) 4× (suspension)	Sala Polivalente Kid Chocolate, Havana; Attendance: 400; Referees: Reyes, Zuñiga (CUB)

=== Final ===
28 May 2015; 19:00	Brazil	26–22	Cuba	Sala Polivalente Kid Chocolate, Havana; Attendance: 2,000; Referees: Lenci, López (ARG)
28 May 2015; 19:00	F. Rocha 6	(13–11)	Lusson 10	Sala Polivalente Kid Chocolate, Havana; Attendance: 2,000; Referees: Lenci, López (ARG)
28 May 2015; 19:00	3× (yellow card) 2× (suspension)	Report	3× (yellow card) 5× (suspension)	Sala Polivalente Kid Chocolate, Havana; Attendance: 2,000; Referees: Lenci, López (ARG)

== Final ranking ==
Rank	Team
Gold medal	Brazil
Silver medal	Cuba
Bronze medal	Argentina
4	Puerto Rico
5	Uruguay
6	Greenland
7	Paraguay
8	Mexico
9	Chile
10	United States
11	Venezuela
12	Guatemala

Team advanced to the 2015 World Women's Handball Championship
Team advanced to the Final qualification tournament

- Uruguay, Greenland, and Paraguay all declined participation in the "Final qualification tournament" allowing Mexico the opportunity.

== Awards ==
All-star team

- Goalkeeper: (Brazil) Jéssica Oliveira
- Right Wing: (Cuba) Gleinys Reyes
- Right Back: (Puerto Rico) Nathalys Ceballos
- Playmaker: (Cuba) Eyatne Rizo
- Left Back: (Brazil) Jaqueline Anastácio
- Left Wing: (Brazil) Samira Rocha
- Pivot: (Argentina) Antonela Mena
