= Nor.Ca. Women's Handball Championship =

Women's handball competition

The Nor.Ca. Women's Handball Championship is a competition for women's national handball teams in North America and the Caribbean. In addition to crowning the Nor.Ca. champions, the tournament also served as a qualifying tournament for the Pan American Handball Championship. Starting from the 2019 edition, the tournament is a qualifying event for the IHF World Women's Handball Championship.

== Summary ==
Year	Host	Final			Third place match		
Year	Host	Champion	Score	Runner-up	Third place	Score	Fourth place
2015; Details	(Puerto Rico); Salinas	Cuba	34–25	Mexico	United States	27–23	Greenland
2017; Details	(Puerto Rico); Río Grande	Puerto Rico	28–27	United States	Dominican Republic	32–27	Greenland
2019; Details	Mexico City	Cuba	27–24	Puerto Rico	Greenland	22–20	Dominican Republic
2021; Details	(United States); Elgin	Puerto Rico	34–24	Greenland	Mexico	28–14	United States
2023; Details	(Greenland); Nuuk	Greenland	17–15	Canada	Mexico	29–27	Cuba
2025; Details	Mexico City	Cuba	32–21	Mexico	Canada	26–20	United States

== Medal table ==
Rank	Nation	Gold	Silver	Bronze	Total
1	Cuba	3	0	0	3
2	Puerto Rico	2	1	0	3
3	Greenland	1	1	1	3
4	Mexico	0	2	2	4
5	Canada	0	1	1	2
5	United States	0	1	1	2
7	Dominican Republic	0	0	1	1
Totals (7 entries)		6	6	6	18

== Participating nations ==
Nation	(Puerto Rico) 2015	(Puerto Rico) 2017	(Mexico) 2019	(United States) 2021	(Greenland) 2023	(Mexico) 2025	Years
Canada	–	–	7th	–	2nd	3rd	3
Cuba	1st	–	1st	–	4th	1st	4
Dominican Republic	–	3rd	4th	–	–	–	2
Greenland	4th	4th	3rd	2nd	1st	–	5
Martinique	6th	–	–	–	–	–	1
Mexico	2nd	–	6th	3rd	3rd	2nd	5
Puerto Rico	5th	1st	2nd	1st	–	5th	5
United States	3rd	2nd	5th	4th	5th	4th	6
Total	6	4	7	4	5	5	

== See also ==
- Nor.Ca. Men's Handball Championship
- Pan American Women's Handball Championship
- Handball at the Pan American Games
