= Cuba women's national handball team =

Cuba

Information
- Association: Federación Cubana de Balonmano
- Coach: Osvaldo Hernández
- Assistant coach: Jorge Coll; Juan Conde

Colours
| 1st | 2nd |

Results

World Championship
- Appearances: 5 (First in 1999)
- Best result: 21st (1999, 2019)

Pan American Championship
- Appearances: 3 (First in 1999)
- Best result: 2nd (1999, 2015)
- Last updated on Unknown.

Cuba women's national handball team
Medal record

Pan American Championship
| Silver medal – second place | 1999 Argentina | |
| Silver medal – second place | 2015 Cuba | |
| Bronze medal – third place | 2011 Brazil | |

Pan American Games
| Silver medal – second place | 2007 Brazil | Team |
| Bronze medal – third place | 1999 Canada | Team |

Central American and Caribbean Games
| Gold medal – first place | 1993 Puerto Rico | Team |
| Gold medal – first place | 2006 Dominican Republic | Team |
| Gold medal – first place | 2014 Mexico | Team |
| Gold medal – first place | 2023 El Salvador | Team |

Nor.Ca. Handball Championship
| Gold medal – first place | 2015 Puerto Rico | |
| Gold medal – first place | 2019 Mexico | |
| Gold medal – first place | 2025 Mexico | |

The Cuba women's national handball team represents Cuba in international handball competitions, and is controlled by the Federación Cubana de Balonmano.

The team participated in their first world cup the 1999 World Women's Handball Championship and then again at the 2011 World Women's Handball Championship. At the 2025 World Women's Handball Championship they managed to get their first ever World Cup win after 18 losses in a row, after they beat Kazakhstan 29-28.

== Results ==
=== World Championship ===
| Year | Round | Position | GP | W | D* | L | GS | GA |
|---|---|---|---|---|---|---|---|---|
| (Denmark) (Norway) 1999 | preliminary round | 21st | 5 | 0 | 0 | 5 | 103 | 181 |
| (Brazil) 2011 | President's Cup | 23rd | 7 | 1 | 0 | 6 | 174 | 221 |
| (Denmark) 2015 | President's Cup | 23rd | 7 | 1 | 0 | 6 | 176 | 245 |
| (Japan) 2019 | President's Cup | 21st | 7 | 2 | 0 | 5 | 200 | 279 |
| (Germany) (Netherlands) 2025 | President's Cup | 30th | 7 | 1 | 1 | 5 | 143 | 229 |
| Total | 5/27 | | 33 | 5 | 1 | 27 | 796 | 1155 |

=== Pan American Championship ===
| Year | Round | Position | GP | W | D* | L | GS | GA |
|---|---|---|---|---|---|---|---|---|
| (Argentina) 1999 | round robin | 2nd | 5 | 3 | 1 | 1 | 140 | 93 |
| (Brazil) 2011 | 3rd place match | 3rd | 5 | 3 | 0 | 2 | 174 | 143 |
| (Cuba) 2015 | Final | 2nd | 7 | 6 | 0 | 1 | 246 | 152 |
| Total | 3/14 | | 17 | 12 | 1 | 4 | 560 | 388 |

=== Pan American Games ===
- 1987 – 4th
- 1995 – 4th
- 1999 – 3rd

| Games | Round | Position | Pld | W | D | L | GF | GA |
|---|---|---|---|---|---|---|---|---|
| (Brazil) 2007 Rio de Janeiro | gold medal match | 2nd place | 5 | 3 | 0 | 2 | 151 | 127 |
| (Canada) 2015 Toronto | 5th place match | 5th place | 5 | 4 | 0 | 1 | 153 | 130 |

=== Central American and Caribbean Games ===
| Games | Round | Position | Pld | W | D | L | GF | GA |
|---|---|---|---|---|---|---|---|---|
| (El Salvador) 2018 Barranquilla | Bronze medal game | 3rd | 5 | 3 | 0 | 2 | 148 | 99 |
| (Colombia) 2023 San Salvador | Gold medal game | 1st | 5 | 4 | 0 | 1 | 173 | 122 |

=== Nor.Ca. Championship ===
| Year | Round | Position | GP | W | D* | L | GS | GA |
|---|---|---|---|---|---|---|---|---|
| (Puerto Rico) 2015 | Final | 1st | 6 | 6 | 0 | 0 | 215 | 115 |
| (Puerto Rico) 2017 | Did not participate | | | | | | | |
| (Mexico) 2019 | Final | 1st | 5 | 5 | 0 | 0 | 139 | 102 |
| (United States) 2021 | Did not participate | | | | | | | |
| (Greenland) 2023 | Bronze medal game | 4th | 5 | 1 | 0 | 4 | 132 | 125 |
| (Mexico) 2025 | Final | 1st | 5 | 5 | 0 | 0 | 157 | 100 |
| Total | 4/6 | | 21 | 17 | 0 | 4 | 643 | 442 |

=== Caribbean Handball Cup ===
| Year | Round | Position | GP | W | D* | L | GS | GA |
|---|---|---|---|---|---|---|---|---|
| (Colombia) 2017 | bronze medal match | 4 | 6 | 2 | 1 | 3 | 175 | 161 |

=== Other tournaments ===
- 2016 Women's Four Nations Tournament – 4th

== Current squad ==
Squad for the 2025 World Women's Handball Championship.

Head coach: Osvaldo Hernández

| No. | Pos. | Name | Date of birth (age) | Height | App. | Goals | Club |
|---|---|---|---|---|---|---|---|
| 1 | GK | Niurkis Mora | 6 October 1994 (age 31) | 1.83 m | 36 | 4 | (France) Rouen Handball |
| 2 | RW | Zajaris Hernández | 26 January 2006 (age 19) | 1.83 m | 15 | 31 | Santiago de Cuba |
| 4 | RW | Liliamnis Rosabal | 3 July 1999 (age 26) | 1.73 m | 29 | 31 | (Cuba) Granma |
| 6 | P | Dianny González | 19 September 1998 (age 27) | 1.81 m | 18 | 31 | (Cuba) Matanzas Handball |
| 10 | RW | Gleinys Reyes | 31 July 1989 (age 36) | 1.78 m | 35 | 62 | (Spain) CB Zonzamas |
| 11 | CB | Diancy González | 19 September 1998 (age 27) | 1.70 m | 10 | 8 | (Cuba) Matanzas Handball |
| 15 | RW | Odalys Escalona | 1 October 1983 (age 42) | 1.74 m | 24 | 10 | (Spain) CB Bolaños |
| 16 | GK | Danielys Herranz | 26 January 1999 (age 26) | 1.78 m | 35 | 2 | (Italy) HAC Nuoro |
| 17 | CB | Angela Amoros | 11 May 1992 (age 33) | 1.68 m | 24 | 28 | (Cuba) Matanzas Handball |
| 18 | RB | Lorena Téllez | 26 November 1996 (age 29) | 1.82 m | 25 | 49 | (Spain) CB Atlético Guardés |
| 24 | LB | Schakira Robert | 5 September 1996 (age 29) | 1.75 m | 25 | 17 | (Spain) Ciudad Real |
| 26 | RW | Anna Sardiñas | 27 October 2007 (age 18) | 1.85 m | 5 | 21 | (Cuba) La Habana |
| 30 | CB | Adriana Arencibia | 3 March 2003 (age 22) | 1.72 m | 0 | 0 | (Cuba) Villa Clara |
| 34 | LW | Yennifer Toledo | 1 October 2000 (age 25) | 1.83 m | 22 | 58 | (Kosovo) KHF Samadrexha |
| 55 | CB | Yarumy Céspedes | 2 January 1996 (age 29) | 1.70 m | 28 | 45 | (Spain) CB T-Maravilla |
| 80 | P | Melissa Chala | 27 April 2004 (age 21) | 1.82 m | 24 | 21 | (Cuba) Pinar del Río |
