= Handball at the 2026 Central American and Caribbean Games =

- Venue: Pabellón de Balonmano
- Location: Santo Domingo Este, Dominican Republic
- Start date: 29 July 2026
- End date: 7 August 2026

The handball competition at the 2026 Central American and Caribbean Games was held in Santo Domingo Este, Dominican Republic, from 29 July to 7 August 2026 at the Pabellón de Balonmano.

== Participating nations ==
The number of athletes a nation entered is in parentheses beside the name of the country.

Men

- Costa Rica (14)
- Cuba (14)
- Dominican Republic (14)
- Guatemala (14)
- Mexico (14)
- Nicaragua (14)
- Puerto Rico (14)
- Venezuela (14)

Women

- Costa Rica (14)
- Cuba (14)
- Dominican Republic (14)
- Guatemala (14)
- Mexico (14)
- Nicaragua (14)
- Puerto Rico (14)
- Venezuela (14)

== Medal table ==
* Host nation (Dominican Republic)

Rank	Nation	Gold	Silver	Bronze	Total
1	Cuba (CUB)	2	0	0	2
2	Dominican Republic (DOM)*	0	1	1	2
3	Puerto Rico (PUR)	0	1	0	1
4	Mexico (MEX)	0	0	1	1
Totals (4 entries)		2	2	2	6

== Medal summary ==
Event	Gold	Silver	Bronze
Men's tournament	Cuba; Esniel Negret; Ronaldo Almeida; Sondy Benítez; Reylan González; Adrián Azcuy; Hanser Rodríguez; Osmany Miniet; Maiko Vázquez; Ronal Menéndez; Magnol Suárez; Lisván Mora; Mario Pérez; Geovanys Claro; Jorge Luis	Puerto Rico; Pascual Pacheco; Alberto Pizarro; José Sánchez; Yadnier Nieves; Christian Marín; Jorge Nazario; José Ceballos; Antwan García; Izahar González; Luis Hernández; Pablo Monge; Pablo Rodríguez; Edwin Brito; Dylan Andreu	Dominican Republic; Erick Montero; Luiggy López; Luis Objío; Maykol Beras; Geraldo Díaz; Joaquín de la Cruz; Jorge Soto; Francis de la Cruz; Heriberto Merino; Willibert de la Rosa; Luis Tejeda; Julio Alcántara; Pedro Matos; Adonis González
Women's tournament	Cuba; Niurkis Mora; Zajaris Hernández; Lietis Beltrán; Diancy González; Gleinys Reyes; Dianny González; Odalys Escalona; Danielys Herranz; Lorena Téllez; Schakira Robert; María Mazorra; Jennifer Toledo; Yarumy Céspedes; Melissa Chala	Dominican Republic; Cari Domínguez; Yojaver Brito; Mabelin Wattley; Danilza Liranzo; Annerys Cabrera; Nancy Peña; Mariela Andino; Carina Lorenzo; Florquidia Puello; Suleidi Suárez; Ania Ramos; Yeimy Novas; Yacaira Tejeda; Olkidia Cuevas	Mexico; Eva Hernández; Gemma Leal; Itzel Aguirre; Dahena Paz; Brenda Govea; Angela Tapia; Itzel Vargas; Fernanda Rivera; Sayra Pereira; Nataly González; Cinthia Gallegos; Laura Morales; Perla Fernández; Yuridia Arenas

== Women's tournament ==
=== Group A ===
Pos	Team	Pld	W	D	L	GF	GA	GD	Pts	Qualification
1	Dominican Republic (H)	3	3	0	0	94	55	+39	6	Semifinals
2	Puerto Rico	3	2	0	1	92	78	+14	4	Semifinals
3	Guatemala	3	1	0	2	69	81	−12	2	5–8th place semifinals
4	Nicaragua	3	0	0	3	75	116	−41	0	5–8th place semifinals

Source: Centro Caribe Sports
Rules for classification: 1) points; 2) head-to-head points; 3) head-to-head goal difference; 4) head-to-head number of goals scored; 5) goal difference.
(H) Hosts

29 July 2026; 15:00	Puerto Rico	30–24	Guatemala	Handball Pavilion, Santo Domingo Este; Referees: R. Oyarzun, A. Zaragüeta (ESP)
29 July 2026; 15:00	Ceballos 6	(14–13)	Ampudia 7	Handball Pavilion, Santo Domingo Este; Referees: R. Oyarzun, A. Zaragüeta (ESP)
29 July 2026; 15:00	4× (suspension) 1× (red card)	Report	1× (yellow card) 2× (suspension)	Handball Pavilion, Santo Domingo Este; Referees: R. Oyarzun, A. Zaragüeta (ESP)

29 July 2026; 19:00	Dominican Republic	45–19	Nicaragua	Handball Pavilion, Santo Domingo Este; Referees: M. Fabryczny, J. Rawicki (POL)
29 July 2026; 19:00	Brito 11	(21–13)	Suárez 6	Handball Pavilion, Santo Domingo Este; Referees: M. Fabryczny, J. Rawicki (POL)
29 July 2026; 19:00	5× (suspension) 1× (red card)	Report	1× (suspension)	Handball Pavilion, Santo Domingo Este; Referees: M. Fabryczny, J. Rawicki (POL)

31 July 2026; 15:00	Nicaragua	30–40	Puerto Rico	Handball Pavilion, Santo Domingo Este; Referees: J. López, J. Monjarás (MEX)
31 July 2026; 15:00	Ortega, Tercero 6	(15–20)	Rodríguez 9	Handball Pavilion, Santo Domingo Este; Referees: J. López, J. Monjarás (MEX)
31 July 2026; 15:00	4× (suspension) 1× (red card)	Report	6× (suspension)	Handball Pavilion, Santo Domingo Este; Referees: J. López, J. Monjarás (MEX)

31 July 2026; 19:00	Guatemala	14–25	Dominican Republic	Handball Pavilion, Santo Domingo Este; Referees: M. Fabryczny, J. Rawicki (POL)
31 July 2026; 19:00	Ampudia 4	(10–13)	Brito, Liranzo 6	Handball Pavilion, Santo Domingo Este; Referees: M. Fabryczny, J. Rawicki (POL)
31 July 2026; 19:00	1× (yellow card) 1× (suspension)	Report	1× (yellow card) 5× (suspension)	Handball Pavilion, Santo Domingo Este; Referees: M. Fabryczny, J. Rawicki (POL)

2 August 2026; 15:00	Nicaragua	26–31	Guatemala	Handball Pavilion, Santo Domingo Este; Referees: J. Monjará, J. López (MEX)
2 August 2026; 15:00	Suárez 7	(13–12)	López 8	Handball Pavilion, Santo Domingo Este; Referees: J. Monjará, J. López (MEX)
2 August 2026; 15:00	5× (suspension)	Report	5× (suspension)	Handball Pavilion, Santo Domingo Este; Referees: J. Monjará, J. López (MEX)

2 August 2026; 19:00	Dominican Republic	24–22	Puerto Rico	Handball Pavilion, Santo Domingo Este; Referees: R. Oyarzun, A. Zaragüeta (ESP)
2 August 2026; 19:00	Brito, Ramos 7	(10–13)	Ceballos 8	Handball Pavilion, Santo Domingo Este; Referees: R. Oyarzun, A. Zaragüeta (ESP)
2 August 2026; 19:00	5× (suspension)	Report	1× (yellow card) 5× (suspension)	Handball Pavilion, Santo Domingo Este; Referees: R. Oyarzun, A. Zaragüeta (ESP)

=== Group B ===
Pos	Team	Pld	W	D	L	GF	GA	GD	Pts	Qualification
1	Cuba	3	3	0	0	101	65	+36	6	Semifinals
2	Mexico	3	2	0	1	85	80	+5	4	Semifinals
3	Venezuela	3	1	0	2	73	82	−9	2	5–8th place semifinals
4	Costa Rica	3	0	0	3	56	88	−32	0	5–8th place semifinals

Source: Centro Caribe Sports
Rules for classification: 1) points; 2) head-to-head points; 3) head-to-head goal difference; 4) head-to-head number of goals scored; 5) goal difference.

29 July 2026; 13:00	Mexico	29–20	Costa Rica	Handball Pavilion, Santo Domingo Este; Referees: F. Estrada, J. Paternina (COL)
29 July 2026; 13:00	Leal 7	(15–8)	Polanco 6	Handball Pavilion, Santo Domingo Este; Referees: F. Estrada, J. Paternina (COL)
29 July 2026; 13:00	2× (suspension) 1× (red card)	Report	4× (suspension)	Handball Pavilion, Santo Domingo Este; Referees: F. Estrada, J. Paternina (COL)

29 July 2026; 17:00	Cuba	32–23	Venezuela	Handball Pavilion, Santo Domingo Este; Referees: C. Sánchez, K. Torres (PUR)
29 July 2026; 17:00	Beltrán, Robert 5	(14–9)	Barinas 6	Handball Pavilion, Santo Domingo Este; Referees: C. Sánchez, K. Torres (PUR)
29 July 2026; 17:00	3× (suspension)	Report	4× (suspension)	Handball Pavilion, Santo Domingo Este; Referees: C. Sánchez, K. Torres (PUR)

31 July 2026; 13:00	Venezuela	23–33	Mexico	Handball Pavilion, Santo Domingo Este; Referees: A. Vega, J. Salas (NCA)
31 July 2026; 13:00	Barinas 7	(8–16)	Vargas 8	Handball Pavilion, Santo Domingo Este; Referees: A. Vega, J. Salas (NCA)
31 July 2026; 13:00	4× (suspension)	Report	1× (yellow card) 7× (suspension)	Handball Pavilion, Santo Domingo Este; Referees: A. Vega, J. Salas (NCA)

31 July 2026; 17:00	Costa Rica	19–32	Cuba	Handball Pavilion, Santo Domingo Este; Referees: F. Estrada, J. Paternina (COL)
31 July 2026; 17:00	Polanco 5	(9–16)	Mazorra 8	Handball Pavilion, Santo Domingo Este; Referees: F. Estrada, J. Paternina (COL)
31 July 2026; 17:00	5× (suspension)	Report	1× (yellow card) 8× (suspension)	Handball Pavilion, Santo Domingo Este; Referees: F. Estrada, J. Paternina (COL)

2 August 2026; 13:00	Costa Rica	17–27	Venezuela	Handball Pavilion, Santo Domingo Este; Referees: A. Vega, J. Salas (NCA)
2 August 2026; 13:00	Corrales 5	(8–13)	Machado 6	Handball Pavilion, Santo Domingo Este; Referees: A. Vega, J. Salas (NCA)
2 August 2026; 13:00	1× (yellow card) 5× (suspension)	Report	2× (suspension) 1× (red card)	Handball Pavilion, Santo Domingo Este; Referees: A. Vega, J. Salas (NCA)

2 August 2026; 17:00	Cuba	37–23	Mexico	Handball Pavilion, Santo Domingo Este; Referees: L. De Jesús, Y. Agramonte (DOM)
2 August 2026; 17:00	Téllez 10	(16–16)	Aguirre 6	Handball Pavilion, Santo Domingo Este; Referees: L. De Jesús, Y. Agramonte (DOM)
2 August 2026; 17:00	6× (suspension)	Report	3× (suspension) 1× (red card)	Handball Pavilion, Santo Domingo Este; Referees: L. De Jesús, Y. Agramonte (DOM)

=== Placement matches ===
==== 5–8th place semifinals ====
4 August 2026; 13:00	Guatemala	20–15	Costa Rica	Handball Pavilion, Santo Domingo Este; Referees: J. Salas, A. Vega (NCA)
4 August 2026; 13:00	Abularach 4	(13–6)	Polanco 6	Handball Pavilion, Santo Domingo Este; Referees: J. Salas, A. Vega (NCA)
4 August 2026; 13:00	1× (yellow card) 1× (suspension)	Report	1× (yellow card) 5× (suspension)	Handball Pavilion, Santo Domingo Este; Referees: J. Salas, A. Vega (NCA)

4 August 2026; 15:00	Venezuela	45–28	Nicaragua	Handball Pavilion, Santo Domingo Este; Referees: K. Torres, C. Sánchez (PUR)
4 August 2026; 15:00	Machado 10	(25–14)	Tercero 8	Handball Pavilion, Santo Domingo Este; Referees: K. Torres, C. Sánchez (PUR)
4 August 2026; 15:00	1× (suspension)	Report	1× (suspension)	Handball Pavilion, Santo Domingo Este; Referees: K. Torres, C. Sánchez (PUR)

==== Seventh place match ====
6 August 2026
13:00
Costa Rica
28–25
Nicaragua
Handball Pavilion, Santo Domingo Este
Referees: J. López, J. Monjarás (MEX)
Araya, Corrales 7
(11–9)
Bervis 7
5× (suspension)
Report
2× (suspension)

FT: 25–25 Pen: 3–0

==== Fifth place match ====
6 August 2026; 15:00	Guatemala	18–26	Venezuela	Handball Pavilion, Santo Domingo Este; Referees: J. Paternina, F. Estrada (COL)
6 August 2026; 15:00	Ugalde 4	(10–13)	Barinas, Carvajal 5	Handball Pavilion, Santo Domingo Este; Referees: J. Paternina, F. Estrada (COL)
6 August 2026; 15:00	2× (suspension)	Report	1× (suspension)	Handball Pavilion, Santo Domingo Este; Referees: J. Paternina, F. Estrada (COL)

=== Semifinals ===
4 August 2026; 17:00	Dominican Republic	29–27	Mexico	Handball Pavilion, Santo Domingo Este; Referees: M. Fabryczny, J. Rawicki (POL)
4 August 2026; 17:00	Brito, Ramos 6	(13–17)	Tapia 8	Handball Pavilion, Santo Domingo Este; Referees: M. Fabryczny, J. Rawicki (POL)
4 August 2026; 17:00	2× (suspension)	Report	1× (yellow card) 3× (suspension)	Handball Pavilion, Santo Domingo Este; Referees: M. Fabryczny, J. Rawicki (POL)

4 August 2026; 19:00	Cuba	29–28	Puerto Rico	Handball Pavilion, Santo Domingo Este; Referees: F. Estrada, J. Paternina (COL)
4 August 2026; 19:00	Téllez 9	(19–17)	Ceballos 9	Handball Pavilion, Santo Domingo Este; Referees: F. Estrada, J. Paternina (COL)
4 August 2026; 19:00	3× (suspension) 1× (red card)	Report	1× (yellow card) 4× (suspension)	Handball Pavilion, Santo Domingo Este; Referees: F. Estrada, J. Paternina (COL)

=== Bronze medal match ===
6 August 2026; 17:00	Mexico	32–28	Puerto Rico	Handball Pavilion, Santo Domingo Este; Referees: Y. Agramonte, L. De Jesús (DOM)
6 August 2026; 17:00	Leal 12	(17–13)	Ceballos 7	Handball Pavilion, Santo Domingo Este; Referees: Y. Agramonte, L. De Jesús (DOM)
6 August 2026; 17:00	3× (suspension)	Report	2× (yellow card) 2× (suspension)	Handball Pavilion, Santo Domingo Este; Referees: Y. Agramonte, L. De Jesús (DOM)

=== Gold medal match ===
6 August 2026; 19:00	Dominican Republic	17–35	Cuba	Handball Pavilion, Santo Domingo Este; Referees: A. Zaragüeta, R. Oyarzun (ESP)
6 August 2026; 19:00	Brito 4	(8–12)	Beltrán 5	Handball Pavilion, Santo Domingo Este; Referees: A. Zaragüeta, R. Oyarzun (ESP)
6 August 2026; 19:00	4× (suspension)	Report	1× (yellow card) 3× (suspension)	Handball Pavilion, Santo Domingo Este; Referees: A. Zaragüeta, R. Oyarzun (ESP)

=== Final ranking ===
Rank	Team
1st place, gold medalist(s)	Cuba
2nd place, silver medalist(s)	Dominican Republic
3rd place, bronze medalist(s)	Mexico
4	Puerto Rico
5	Venezuela
6	Guatemala
7	Costa Rica
8	Nicaragua
