= Handball at the 2019 Pan American Games – Women's tournament =

Women's handball at the XVIII Pan American Games

Tournament details
- Host country: Peru
- Venue(s): 1 (in 1 host city)
- Dates: 24–30 July
- Teams: 8 (from 2 confederations)

Final positions
- Champions: Brazil (6th title)
- Runners-up: Argentina
- Third place: Cuba
- Fourth place: United States

Tournament statistics
- Matches played: 20
- Goals scored: 968 (48.4 per match)
- Top scorer(s): (Argentina) Elke Karsten (28 goals)

The handball women's tournament at the 2019 Pan American Games in Lima, Peru was held between 24 and 30 July 2019. Eight nations participated. Brazil won its sixth straight title, directly qualifying to the 2020 Summer Olympics.

== Qualification ==
A total eight women's teams qualified to compete at the games in each tournament. The host nation (Peru) qualified in each tournament, along with seven other teams in various qualifying tournaments.

=== Summary ===
Event	Dates	Location	Vacancies	Qualified
Host Nation	—	—	1	Peru
2018 South American Games	27–31 May	(Bolivia) Cochabamba	2	Brazil; Argentina
2018 Central American and Caribbean Games	20–25 July	(Colombia) Barranquilla	3	Dominican Republic; Puerto Rico; Cuba
North Zone Qualifying (Canada vs. United States)	2–5 September	(United States) Auburn (Canada) Montreal	1	United States
Repechage qualification tournament	26–28 March	Mexico City	1	Canada
Total			8	

- Chile (3rd placed finisher at the South American Games), Mexico and Guatemala (4th and 5th at the Central American and Caribbean Games) and Canada (loser of the North Zone Qualifying) competed in the Repechage tournament.

=== North Zone Qualifying ===
2 September 2018	United States	22–20	Canada	Beard–Eaves–Memorial Coliseum, Auburn
2 September 2018		(12–11)		Beard–Eaves–Memorial Coliseum, Auburn

5 September 2018	Canada	16–26	United States	Montreal
5 September 2018		(6–14)		Montreal

United States won 48–36 on aggregate.

=== Repechage qualification tournament ===
Pos	Team	Pld	W	D	L	GF	GA	GD	Pts	Qualification
1	Canada	3	2	0	1	74	62	+12	4 (Note: Canada 2 Pts, +3 GD; Mexico 2 Pts, +1 GD; Chile 2 Pts, −4 GD)	2019 Pan American Games
2	Mexico (H)	3	2	0	1	97	67	+30	4	
3	Chile	3	2	0	1	75	71	+4	4	
4	Guatemala	3	0	0	3	51	97	−46	0	

Rules for classification: 1) Points; 2) Head-to-head points; 3) Head-to-head goal difference; 4) Head-to-head goals scored; 5) Goal difference; 6) Goals scored; 7) Draw.
(H) Hosts
Notes:

26 March 2019	Chile	30–22	Guatemala	Centro Deportivo Olímpico Mexicano, Mexico City
26 March 2019		(16–10)		Centro Deportivo Olímpico Mexicano, Mexico City

26 March 2019	Mexico	29–26	Canada	Centro Deportivo Olímpico Mexicano, Mexico City
26 March 2019		(15–11)		Centro Deportivo Olímpico Mexicano, Mexico City

27 March 2019	Canada	22–16	Chile	Centro Deportivo Olímpico Mexicano, Mexico City
27 March 2019		(10–10)		Centro Deportivo Olímpico Mexicano, Mexico City

27 March 2019	Guatemala	12–41	Mexico	Centro Deportivo Olímpico Mexicano, Mexico City
27 March 2019		(6–20)		Centro Deportivo Olímpico Mexicano, Mexico City

28 March 2019	Canada	26–17	Guatemala	Centro Deportivo Olímpico Mexicano, Mexico City
28 March 2019		(13–6)		Centro Deportivo Olímpico Mexicano, Mexico City

28 March 2019	Mexico	27–29	Chile	Centro Deportivo Olímpico Mexicano, Mexico City
28 March 2019		(12–13)		Centro Deportivo Olímpico Mexicano, Mexico City

== Results ==
All times are in Peru Time (UTC−5).

=== Preliminary round ===
==== Group A ====
Pos	Team	Pld	W	D	L	GF	GA	GD	Pts	Qualification
1	Brazil	3	3	0	0	110	48	+62	6	Semifinals
2	Cuba	3	2	0	1	75	68	+7	4	Semifinals
3	Puerto Rico	3	1	0	2	63	76	−13	2	5–8th place semifinals
4	Canada	3	0	0	3	36	92	−56	0	5–8th place semifinals

Source: Lima 2019
Rules for classification: 1) points; 2) head-to-head points; 3) head-to-head goal difference; 4) head-to-head goals scored; 5) goal difference; 6) goals scored; 7) draw.

24 July 2019; 13:00	Puerto Rico	23−9	Canada	Villa Deportiva Nacional; Referees: Paolantoni, García (ARG)
24 July 2019; 13:00	Ceballos 6	(12−4)	three players 2	Villa Deportiva Nacional; Referees: Paolantoni, García (ARG)
24 July 2019; 13:00	1× (yellow card) 1× (suspension)	Report	1× (yellow card) 3× (suspension)	Villa Deportiva Nacional; Referees: Paolantoni, García (ARG)

24 July 2019; 20:30	Brazil	29−20	Cuba	Villa Deportiva Nacional; Referees: Raluy, Sabroso (ESP)
24 July 2019; 20:30	De Paula 6	(13−9)	Rizo 4	Villa Deportiva Nacional; Referees: Raluy, Sabroso (ESP)
24 July 2019; 20:30	1× (yellow card) 4× (suspension)	Report	1× (yellow card) 4× (suspension)	Villa Deportiva Nacional; Referees: Raluy, Sabroso (ESP)

25 July 2019; 15:30	Cuba	27−24	Puerto Rico	Villa Deportiva Nacional; Referees: Lenci, López (ARG)
25 July 2019; 15:30	three players 4	(14−13)	Ceballos 6	Villa Deportiva Nacional; Referees: Lenci, López (ARG)
25 July 2019; 15:30	4× (suspension)	Report	2× (yellow card) 3× (suspension) 1× (red card)	Villa Deportiva Nacional; Referees: Lenci, López (ARG)

25 July 2019; 20:30	Canada	12−41	Brazil	Villa Deportiva Nacional; Referees: Pineda, Estrada (COL)
25 July 2019; 20:30	four players 2	(5−20)	Castro 10	Villa Deportiva Nacional; Referees: Pineda, Estrada (COL)
25 July 2019; 20:30	2× (yellow card) 4× (suspension)	Report	1× (yellow card) 1× (suspension)	Villa Deportiva Nacional; Referees: Pineda, Estrada (COL)

27 July 2019; 13:00	Cuba	28–15	Canada	Villa Deportiva Nacional; Referees: Paolantoni, García (ARG)
27 July 2019; 13:00	Rosabal, Téllez 6	(11–7)	Benhacine, Routhier 3	Villa Deportiva Nacional; Referees: Paolantoni, García (ARG)
27 July 2019; 13:00	3× (yellow card) 4× (suspension)	Report	1× (yellow card) 6× (suspension)	Villa Deportiva Nacional; Referees: Paolantoni, García (ARG)

27 July 2019; 18:00	Brazil	40–16	Puerto Rico	Villa Deportiva Nacional; Referees: Sosa, Lemes (URU)
27 July 2019; 18:00	Belo 8	(20–10)	Ceballos, García 4	Villa Deportiva Nacional; Referees: Sosa, Lemes (URU)
27 July 2019; 18:00	1× (yellow card) 5× (suspension)	Report	1× (yellow card) 3× (suspension) 1× (red card)	Villa Deportiva Nacional; Referees: Sosa, Lemes (URU)

==== Group B ====
Pos	Team	Pld	W	D	L	GF	GA	GD	Pts	Qualification
1	Argentina	3	3	0	0	105	39	+66	6	Semifinals
2	United States	3	2	0	1	70	59	+11	4	Semifinals
3	Dominican Republic	3	1	0	2	85	69	+16	2	5–8th place semifinals
4	Peru (H)	3	0	0	3	34	127	−93	0	5–8th place semifinals

Source: Lima 2019
Rules for classification: 1) points; 2) head-to-head points; 3) head-to-head goal difference; 4) head-to-head goals scored; 5) goal difference; 6) goals scored; 7) draw.
(H) Hosts

24 July 2019; 15:30	Dominican Republic	46−16	Peru	Villa Deportiva Nacional; Referees: Pineda, Estrada (COL)
24 July 2019; 15:30	Andino 13	(22−7)	Cruz 8	Villa Deportiva Nacional; Referees: Pineda, Estrada (COL)
24 July 2019; 15:30	1× (yellow card) 5× (suspension)	Report	1× (yellow card) 7× (suspension) 1× (red card)	Villa Deportiva Nacional; Referees: Pineda, Estrada (COL)

24 July 2019; 18:00	Argentina	26−15	United States	Villa Deportiva Nacional; Referees: Zuñiga, Reyes (CUB)
24 July 2019; 18:00	Karsten 5	(13−8)	Andersen, Rhoads 5	Villa Deportiva Nacional; Referees: Zuñiga, Reyes (CUB)
24 July 2019; 18:00	1× (yellow card) 3× (suspension)	Report	2× (yellow card) 6× (suspension)	Villa Deportiva Nacional; Referees: Zuñiga, Reyes (CUB)

25 July 2019; 13:00	United States	26−22	Dominican Republic	Villa Deportiva Nacional; Referees: Pinto, Menezes (BRA)
25 July 2019; 13:00	Rhoads, Taylor, 7	(11−10)	three players 4	Villa Deportiva Nacional; Referees: Pinto, Menezes (BRA)
25 July 2019; 13:00	2× (yellow card) 4× (suspension)	Report	3× (yellow card) 5× (suspension)	Villa Deportiva Nacional; Referees: Pinto, Menezes (BRA)

25 July 2019; 18:00	Peru	7−52	Argentina	Villa Deportiva Nacional; Referees: Sosa, Lemes (URU)
25 July 2019; 18:00	Cruz 4	(2−25)	Karsten 10	Villa Deportiva Nacional; Referees: Sosa, Lemes (URU)
25 July 2019; 18:00	1× (yellow card) 6× (suspension)	Report	1× (yellow card) 1× (suspension)	Villa Deportiva Nacional; Referees: Sosa, Lemes (URU)

27 July 2019; 15:30	United States	29–11	Peru	Villa Deportiva Nacional; Referees: Zuñiga, Reyes (CUB)
27 July 2019; 15:30	Butler, Taylor 5	(16–8)	Cruz, Servat 4	Villa Deportiva Nacional; Referees: Zuñiga, Reyes (CUB)
27 July 2019; 15:30	3× (yellow card) 3× (suspension)	Report	1× (suspension)	Villa Deportiva Nacional; Referees: Zuñiga, Reyes (CUB)

27 July 2019; 20:30	Argentina	27–17	Dominican Republic	Villa Deportiva Nacional; Referees: Pinto, Menezes (BRA)
27 July 2019; 20:30	Pizzo 6	(13–6)	Cabrera 4	Villa Deportiva Nacional; Referees: Pinto, Menezes (BRA)
27 July 2019; 20:30	1× (yellow card) 6× (suspension)	Report	1× (yellow card) 8× (suspension) 1× (red card)	Villa Deportiva Nacional; Referees: Pinto, Menezes (BRA)

=== Classification round ===
5–8th place semifinals
29 July — Lima
Dominican Republic	24
Canada	23
29 July — Lima
Puerto Rico	43
Peru	14

Fifth place
30 July — Lima
Dominican Republic	26
Puerto Rico	24
Seventh place
30 July — Lima
Canada	31
Peru	12

==== 5–8th place semifinals ====
29 July 2019; 10:00	Dominican Republic	24–23	Canada	Villa Deportiva Nacional; Referees: Sosa, Lemes (URU)
29 July 2019; 10:00	Brito, Lorenzo 5	(9–14)	Benhacine 8	Villa Deportiva Nacional; Referees: Sosa, Lemes (URU)
29 July 2019; 10:00	2× (yellow card) 4× (suspension) 1× (red card)	Report	2× (yellow card) 3× (suspension)	Villa Deportiva Nacional; Referees: Sosa, Lemes (URU)

29 July 2019; 12:00	Puerto Rico	43–14	Peru	Villa Deportiva Nacional; Referees: Lenci, López (ARG)
29 July 2019; 12:00	Fuentes 8	(24–7)	Cruz 4	Villa Deportiva Nacional; Referees: Lenci, López (ARG)
29 July 2019; 12:00		Report	3× (suspension)	Villa Deportiva Nacional; Referees: Lenci, López (ARG)

==== Seventh place match ====
30 July 2019; 10:00	Canada	31–12	Peru	Villa Deportiva Nacional; Referees: Pineda, Estrada (COL)
30 July 2019; 10:00	Routhier 8	(17–6)	Delgado 5	Villa Deportiva Nacional; Referees: Pineda, Estrada (COL)
30 July 2019; 10:00	1× (yellow card) 2× (suspension)	Report	1× (yellow card) 2× (suspension)	Villa Deportiva Nacional; Referees: Pineda, Estrada (COL)

==== Fifth place match ====
30 July 2019; 12:00	Dominican Republic	26–24	Puerto Rico	Villa Deportiva Nacional; Referees: Zuñiga, Reyes (CUB)
30 July 2019; 12:00	Nova 6	(13–14)	four players 4	Villa Deportiva Nacional; Referees: Zuñiga, Reyes (CUB)
30 July 2019; 12:00	3× (yellow card) 2× (suspension)	Report	2× (yellow card) 1× (suspension) 1× (red card)	Villa Deportiva Nacional; Referees: Zuñiga, Reyes (CUB)

=== Medal round ===
Semifinals
29 July — Lima
Argentina	31
Cuba	21
29 July — Lima
Brazil	34
United States	9

Final
30 July — Lima
Argentina	21
Brazil	30
Third place
30 July — Lima
Cuba	24
United States	23

==== Semifinals ====
29 July 2019; 18:00	Argentina	31–21	Cuba	Villa Deportiva Nacional; Referees: Raluy, Sabroso (ESP)
29 July 2019; 18:00	Karsten 6	(17–7)	Rizo 8	Villa Deportiva Nacional; Referees: Raluy, Sabroso (ESP)
29 July 2019; 18:00	2× (yellow card) 3× (suspension)	Report	2× (yellow card) 3× (suspension) 1× (red card)	Villa Deportiva Nacional; Referees: Raluy, Sabroso (ESP)

29 July 2019; 20:30	Brazil	34–9	United States	Villa Deportiva Nacional; Referees: Pineda, Estrada (COL)
29 July 2019; 20:30	Castro 8	(15–3)	Rhoads 5	Villa Deportiva Nacional; Referees: Pineda, Estrada (COL)
29 July 2019; 20:30	1× (yellow card) 2× (suspension)	Report	1× (yellow card) 2× (suspension)	Villa Deportiva Nacional; Referees: Pineda, Estrada (COL)

==== Bronze medal match ====
30 July 2019; 18:00	Cuba	24–23	United States	Villa Deportiva Nacional; Referees: Paolantoni, García (ARG)
30 July 2019; 18:00	Rizo 6	(13–12)	Andersen 8	Villa Deportiva Nacional; Referees: Paolantoni, García (ARG)
30 July 2019; 18:00	2× (yellow card) 4× (suspension)	Report	3× (suspension)	Villa Deportiva Nacional; Referees: Paolantoni, García (ARG)

==== Gold medal match ====
30 July 2019; 20:30	Argentina	21–30	Brazil	Villa Deportiva Nacional; Referees: Sosa, Lemes (URU)
30 July 2019; 20:30	Karsten 4	(12–12)	Amorim, Fachinello 5	Villa Deportiva Nacional; Referees: Sosa, Lemes (URU)
30 July 2019; 20:30	1× (yellow card) 1× (suspension)	Report	4× (yellow card) 5× (suspension)	Villa Deportiva Nacional; Referees: Sosa, Lemes (URU)

== Ranking and statistics ==
Rank	Team
1st place, gold medalist(s)	Brazil
2nd place, silver medalist(s)	Argentina
3rd place, bronze medalist(s)	Cuba
4	United States
5	Dominican Republic
6	Puerto Rico
7	Canada
8	Peru

Qualified for the 2020 Summer Olympics
Qualified for the Olympic Qualification Tournament

2019 Pan American Games winners

Brazil
Sixth title

=== Top scorers ===
Rank	Name	Goals	Shots	%
1	(Argentina) Elke Karsten	28	56	50
2	(Brazil) Adriana Cardoso de Castro	27	36	75
3	(Dominican Republic) Mariela Andino	24	32	75
4	(Argentina) Manuela Pizzo	24	36	67
5	(United States) Jence Ann Rhoads	24	40	60

Source: Lima 2019 Archived 2019-07-31 at the Wayback Machine

=== Top goalkeepers ===
Rank	Name	%	Saves	Shots
1	(Brazil) Renata Arruda	51	35	69
2	(Argentina) Nadia Bordon	51	21	41
3	(Argentina) Marisol Carratu	41	48	118
4	(Dominican Republic) Cari Domínguez	38	47	124
5	(Brazil) Bárbara Arenhart	37	25	68

Source: Lima 2019 Archived 2019-07-31 at the Wayback Machine
