= 2017 Pan American Women's Handball Championship =

Tournament details
- Host country: Argentina
- Venue(s): 1 (in 1 host city)
- Dates: 18–25 June
- Teams: 10 (from 1 confederation)

Final positions
- Champions: Brazil (10th title)
- Runners-up: Argentina
- Third place: Paraguay
- Fourth place: Uruguay

Tournament statistics
- Matches played: 29
- Goals scored: 1,482 (51.1 per match)
- Top scorer(s): (Paraguay) Sabrina Fiore (34 goals)

Awards
- Best player: (Brazil) Samira Rocha

The 2017 Pan American Women's Handball Championship was the 14th edition of the Pan American Women's Handball Championship, held in at the Sociedad Alemana de Gimnasia de Villa Ballester, in Buenos Aires Province, Argentina from 18 to 25 June 2017. It acted as American qualifying tournament for the 2017 World Women's Handball Championship. The event was originally set to be held in Toronto, Canada but the Canadian Handball Federation withdrew, citing lack of funds.

Brazil defeated Argentina 38–20 to capture their 10th title.

== Qualified teams ==
Competition	Dates	Vacancies	Qualified
Host nation		1	Argentina
Secured places		5	Brazil; Chile; Colombia; Paraguay; Uruguay
2016 Central American Women's Handball Championship	22–26 November 2016	1	Guatemala
2017 Nor.Ca. Women's Handball Championship	30 March–3 April 2017	3	Dominican Republic; Puerto Rico; United States

== Preliminary round ==
The schedule was announced on 16 May 2017, with the exact throw-off times being published on 2 June 2017.

All times are local (UTC−3).

=== Group A ===
Pos	Team	Pld	W	D	L	GF	GA	GD	Pts	Qualification
1	Brazil	4	4	0	0	157	52	+105	8	Semifinals
2	Paraguay	4	3	0	1	107	95	+12	6	Semifinals
3	Puerto Rico	4	2	0	2	98	114	−16	4	
4	United States	4	1	0	3	91	117	−26	2	
5	Colombia	4	0	0	4	67	142	−75	0	

Source: Panamhandball
Rules for classification: 1) points; 2) head-to-head points; 3) head-to-head goal difference; 4) head-to-head number of goals scored; 5) Goal difference.

18 June 2017; 12:00	Paraguay	35–17	Colombia	Estadio Mundialista, Villa Ballester
18 June 2017; 12:00	Fiore 8	(18–11)	Córdoba, Estrada 5	Estadio Mundialista, Villa Ballester
18 June 2017; 12:00	2× (suspension)	Report	1× (yellow card) 6× (suspension)	Estadio Mundialista, Villa Ballester

18 June 2017; 19:15	Brazil	42–10	United States	Estadio Mundialista, Villa Ballester
18 June 2017; 19:15	M. Costa, T. Costa 7	(17–7)	Andersen 3	Estadio Mundialista, Villa Ballester
18 June 2017; 19:15	3× (yellow card) 2× (suspension)	Report	1× (yellow card) 6× (suspension)	Estadio Mundialista, Villa Ballester

19 June 2017; 13:30	United States	25–29	Puerto Rico	Estadio Mundialista, Villa Ballester
19 June 2017; 13:30	Andersen 6	(10–14)	Hiraldo 8	Estadio Mundialista, Villa Ballester
19 June 2017; 13:30	1× (yellow card) 6× (suspension)	Report	1× (yellow card) 4× (suspension)	Estadio Mundialista, Villa Ballester

19 June 2017; 20:00	Colombia	12–46	Brazil	Estadio Mundialista, Villa Ballester
19 June 2017; 20:00	Córdoba 4	(7–20)	M. Costa 8	Estadio Mundialista, Villa Ballester
19 June 2017; 20:00	2× (yellow card) 2× (suspension)	Report	1× (yellow card) 1× (suspension)	Estadio Mundialista, Villa Ballester

20 June 2017; 15:30	Colombia	21–30	Puerto Rico	Estadio Mundialista, Villa Ballester
20 June 2017; 15:30	Córdoba 5	(12–13)	Fuentes 10	Estadio Mundialista, Villa Ballester
20 June 2017; 15:30	3× (yellow card) 7× (suspension)	Report	3× (yellow card) 2× (suspension)	Estadio Mundialista, Villa Ballester

20 June 2017; 20:00	Paraguay	15–29	Brazil	Estadio Mundialista, Villa Ballester
20 June 2017; 20:00	Fiore 5	(12–13)	Quintino 8	Estadio Mundialista, Villa Ballester
20 June 2017; 20:00	3× (yellow card) 4× (suspension)	Report	2× (yellow card) 8× (suspension)	Estadio Mundialista, Villa Ballester

21 June 2017; 15:00	United States	31–17	Colombia	Estadio Mundialista, Villa Ballester
21 June 2017; 15:00	Taylor, Darling 6	(14–8)	Pérez 5	Estadio Mundialista, Villa Ballester
21 June 2017; 15:00	1× (yellow card) 4× (suspension)	Report	2× (yellow card) 8× (suspension)	Estadio Mundialista, Villa Ballester

21 June 2017; 17:00	Paraguay	28–24	Puerto Rico	Estadio Mundialista, Villa Ballester
21 June 2017; 17:00	Fernández, F. Acuña 6	(12–11)	García 9	Estadio Mundialista, Villa Ballester
21 June 2017; 17:00	2× (yellow card) 7× (suspension)	Report	2× (yellow card) 5× (suspension) 1× (red card)	Estadio Mundialista, Villa Ballester

22 June 2017; 14:30	Paraguay	29–25	United States	Estadio Mundialista, Villa Ballester
22 June 2017; 14:30	Fiore 9	(15–11)	Darling 7	Estadio Mundialista, Villa Ballester
22 June 2017; 14:30	1× (yellow card) 2× (suspension)	Report	1× (yellow card) 1× (suspension)	Estadio Mundialista, Villa Ballester

22 June 2017; 19:00	Brazil	40–15	Puerto Rico	Estadio Mundialista, Villa Ballester
22 June 2017; 19:00	M. Costa 7	(17–5)	García 4	Estadio Mundialista, Villa Ballester
22 June 2017; 19:00	1× (yellow card) 2× (suspension)	Report	2× (suspension)	Estadio Mundialista, Villa Ballester

=== Group B ===
Pos	Team	Pld	W	D	L	GF	GA	GD	Pts	Qualification
1	Argentina (H)	4	4	0	0	141	59	+82	8	Semifinals
2	Uruguay	4	3	0	1	114	81	+33	6	Semifinals
3	Chile	4	2	0	2	100	88	+12	4	
4	Dominican Republic	4	1	0	3	74	124	−50	2	
5	Guatemala	4	0	0	4	68	145	−77	0	

Source: Panamhandball
Rules for classification: 1) points; 2) head-to-head points; 3) head-to-head goal difference; 4) head-to-head number of goals scored; 5) Goal difference.
(H) Hosts

18 June 2017; 14:00	Chile	33–11	Dominican Republic	Estadio Mundialista, Villa Ballester
18 June 2017; 14:00	Parra 6	(16–4)	López 3	Estadio Mundialista, Villa Ballester
18 June 2017; 14:00	1× (yellow card) 3× (suspension)	Report	3× (yellow card) 5× (suspension)	Estadio Mundialista, Villa Ballester

18 June 2017; 17:15	Argentina	43–14	Guatemala	Estadio Mundialista, Villa Ballester
18 June 2017; 17:15	Bonazzola 7	(22–10)	Lavarreda 8	Estadio Mundialista, Villa Ballester
18 June 2017; 17:15	3× (yellow card) 1× (suspension)	Report	3× (yellow card) 4× (suspension)	Estadio Mundialista, Villa Ballester

19 June 2017; 15:30	Guatemala	12–39	Uruguay	Estadio Mundialista, Villa Ballester
19 June 2017; 15:30	Lavarreda 6	(5–25)	Schinca 6	Estadio Mundialista, Villa Ballester
19 June 2017; 15:30	2× (yellow card) 2× (suspension)	Report	2× (yellow card)	Estadio Mundialista, Villa Ballester

19 June 2017; 18:00	Dominican Republic	9–43	Argentina	Estadio Mundialista, Villa Ballester
19 June 2017; 18:00	three players 2	(4–21)	Bonazzola 7	Estadio Mundialista, Villa Ballester
19 June 2017; 18:00	5× (suspension)	Report	3× (yellow card)	Estadio Mundialista, Villa Ballester

20 June 2017; 13:30	Uruguay	31–23	Dominican Republic	Estadio Mundialista, Villa Ballester
20 June 2017; 13:30	López 7	(16–9)	López 7	Estadio Mundialista, Villa Ballester
20 June 2017; 13:30	2× (yellow card) 4× (suspension)	Report	2× (yellow card) 8× (suspension) 1× (red card)	Estadio Mundialista, Villa Ballester

20 June 2017; 18:00	Chile	19–26	Argentina	Estadio Mundialista, Villa Ballester
20 June 2017; 18:00	Lovera 4	(9–13)	Karsten 5	Estadio Mundialista, Villa Ballester
20 June 2017; 18:00	2× (yellow card) 4× (suspension)	Report	2× (yellow card) 1× (suspension)	Estadio Mundialista, Villa Ballester

21 June 2017; 13:00	Dominican Republic	31–17	Guatemala	Estadio Mundialista, Villa Ballester
21 June 2017; 13:00	López 8	(17–6)	Herrera 7	Estadio Mundialista, Villa Ballester
21 June 2017; 13:00	1× (yellow card) 5× (suspension)	Report	2× (yellow card) 5× (suspension)	Estadio Mundialista, Villa Ballester

21 June 2017; 19:00	Uruguay	26–17	Chile	Estadio Mundialista, Villa Ballester
21 June 2017; 19:00	Fynn 7	(14–8)	Torres 6	Estadio Mundialista, Villa Ballester
21 June 2017; 19:00	3× (yellow card) 6× (suspension)	Report	6× (suspension) 1× (red card)	Estadio Mundialista, Villa Ballester

22 June 2017; 16:30	Chile	31–25	Guatemala	Estadio Mundialista, Villa Ballester
22 June 2017; 16:30	Canessa, Lovera 5	(18–14)	Lavarreda 8	Estadio Mundialista, Villa Ballester
22 June 2017; 16:30	2× (yellow card) 2× (suspension)	Report	3× (yellow card) 4× (suspension)	Estadio Mundialista, Villa Ballester

22 June 2017; 21:00	Argentina	29–17	Uruguay	Estadio Mundialista, Villa Ballester
22 June 2017; 21:00	Salvadó 8	(11–7)	Scarrone 4	Estadio Mundialista, Villa Ballester
22 June 2017; 21:00	2× (yellow card) 1× (suspension)	Report	1× (yellow card) 6× (suspension)	Estadio Mundialista, Villa Ballester

== Knockout stage ==
=== Bracket ===
Semifinals
Brazil	42
Uruguay	23
Argentina	29
Paraguay	19

Final
Brazil	38
Argentina	20
Third place
Uruguay	22
Paraguay	24

5–8th place bracket

5–8th place semifinals
Puerto Rico	34
Dominican Republic	23
Chile	20
United States	27

Fifth place
Puerto Rico	26
United States	27
Seventh place
Dominican Republic	20
Chile	26

=== 5–8th place semifinals ===
24 June 2017; 12:00	Chile	20–27	United States	Estadio Mundialista, Villa Ballester
24 June 2017; 12:00	Torres 6	(10–13)	Darling 7	Estadio Mundialista, Villa Ballester
24 June 2017; 12:00	1× (yellow card) 2× (suspension)	Report	3× (yellow card) 2× (suspension)	Estadio Mundialista, Villa Ballester

24 June 2017; 14:00	Puerto Rico	34–23	Dominican Republic	Estadio Mundialista, Villa Ballester
24 June 2017; 14:00	García 7	(13–14)	Puello 7	Estadio Mundialista, Villa Ballester
24 June 2017; 14:00	2× (yellow card) 2× (suspension)	Report	1× (yellow card) 4× (suspension)	Estadio Mundialista, Villa Ballester

=== Semifinals ===
24 June 2017; 16:00	Brazil	42–23	Uruguay	Estadio Mundialista, Villa Ballester
24 June 2017; 16:00	Rocha 10	(25–8)	Charlo 6	Estadio Mundialista, Villa Ballester
24 June 2017; 16:00	3× (suspension)	Report	2× (yellow card) 6× (suspension)	Estadio Mundialista, Villa Ballester

24 June 2017; 18:00	Argentina	29–19	Paraguay	Estadio Mundialista, Villa Ballester
24 June 2017; 18:00	Campigli 9	(15–9)	three players 4	Estadio Mundialista, Villa Ballester
24 June 2017; 18:00	1× (yellow card) 2× (suspension)	Report	2× (yellow card) 1× (suspension)	Estadio Mundialista, Villa Ballester

=== Ninth place game ===
24 June 2017; 10:00	Colombia	28–23	Guatemala	Estadio Mundialista, Villa Ballester
24 June 2017; 10:00	Córdoba 6	(14–12)	seven players 3	Estadio Mundialista, Villa Ballester
24 June 2017; 10:00	2× (yellow card) 8× (suspension) 1× (red card)	Report	4× (yellow card) 1× (red card)	Estadio Mundialista, Villa Ballester

=== Seventh place game ===
25 June 2017; 09:30	Chile	26–20	Dominican Republic	Estadio Mundialista, Villa Ballester
25 June 2017; 09:30	three players 4	(14–10)	López 6	Estadio Mundialista, Villa Ballester
25 June 2017; 09:30	2× (yellow card) 2× (suspension)	Report	1× (yellow card) 3× (suspension)	Estadio Mundialista, Villa Ballester

=== Fifth place game ===
25 June 2017; 11:30	United States	27–26	Puerto Rico	Estadio Mundialista, Villa Ballester
25 June 2017; 11:30	Darling 8	(10–15)	Ceballos 7	Estadio Mundialista, Villa Ballester
25 June 2017; 11:30	2× (yellow card) 5× (suspension)	Report	1× (yellow card) 5× (suspension)	Estadio Mundialista, Villa Ballester

=== Third place game ===
25 June 2017; 14:00	Uruguay	22–24	Paraguay	Estadio Mundialista, Villa Ballester
25 June 2017; 14:00	Fynn, Scarrone 5	(13–15)	F. Acuña 7	Estadio Mundialista, Villa Ballester
25 June 2017; 14:00	1× (yellow card) 6× (suspension)	Report	1× (yellow card) 4× (suspension)	Estadio Mundialista, Villa Ballester

=== Final ===
25 June 2017; 16:15	Brazil	38–20	Argentina	Estadio Mundialista, Villa Ballester
25 June 2017; 16:15	Amorim 7	(18–8)	Campigli, Urban 3	Estadio Mundialista, Villa Ballester
25 June 2017; 16:15	2× (yellow card) 2× (suspension)	Report	2× (yellow card) 2× (suspension)	Estadio Mundialista, Villa Ballester

== Final ranking ==
Rank	Team
Gold medal	Brazil
Silver medal	Argentina
Bronze medal	Paraguay
4	Uruguay
5	United States
6	Puerto Rico
7	Chile
8	Dominican Republic
9	Colombia
10	Guatemala

Team qualified to the 2017 World Women's Handball Championship

== Awards ==
All-star team

- Goalkeeper: (Brazil) Bárbara Arenhart
- Right Wing: (Brazil) Jéssica Quintino
- Right Back: (Argentina) Manuela Pizzo
- Playmaker: (Paraguay) Marizza Faría
- Left Back: (Brazil) Eduarda Amorim
- Left Wing: (Brazil) Samira Rocha
- Pivot: (Argentina) Antonela Mena
- MVP: (Brazil) Samira Rocha
