= Adriana Cabrera =

Puerto Rican handball player

Personal information
- Nationality: Puerto Rican
- Born: 23 November 1992 (age 33)
- Height: 1.70 m (5 ft 7 in)

Sport
- Sport: Handball
- Position: Right back
- Current club: Santa Isabel Handball
National team
Years	Team	Apps	(Gls)
–	Puerto Rico	38	(71)
Medal record
Women's handball
Representing Puerto Rico
Central American and Caribbean Games
Silver medal – second place	2018 Barranquilla	Team
Silver medal – second place	2023 San Salvador	Team
Nor.Ca. Championship
Gold medal – first place	2017 Puerto Rico
Gold medal – first place	2021 United States
Caribbean Cup
Silver medal – second place	2017 Colombia

Adriana Cabrera (born 23 November 1992) is a Puerto Rican handball player who plays for the club Santa Isabel Handball. She is member of the Puerto Rican national team. She competed at the 2015 World Women's Handball Championship in Denmark.
