= Joane Vergara =

Puerto Rican handball player

Personal information
- Nationality: Puerto Rican
- Born: 25 August 1990 (age 36)
- Height: 1.63 m (5 ft 4 in)

Sport
- Sport: Handball
- Position: Right wing
- Current club: Rio Grande Handball
National team
Years	Team	Apps	(Gls)
–	Puerto Rico	15	(27)
Medal record
Women's handball
Representing Puerto Rico
Central American and Caribbean Games
Silver medal – second place	2018 Barranquilla	Team
Silver medal – second place	2023 San Salvador	Team
Nor.Ca. Championship
Gold medal – first place	2017 Puerto Rico
Gold medal – first place	2021 United States
Caribbean Cup
Silver medal – second place	2017 Colombia

Joane Vergara (born 25 August 1990) is a Puerto Rican handball player who plays for the club Rio Grande Handball. She is member of the Puerto Rican national team. She competed at the 2015 World Women's Handball Championship in Denmark.
