= Zugeily Soto =

Puerto Rican handball player

Personal information
- Nationality: Puerto Rican
- Born: 9 October 1996 (age 30)
- Height: 1.76 m (5 ft 9 in)

Sport
- Sport: Handball
- Position: Goalkeeper
- Current club: Santa Isabel Handball
National team
Years	Team	Apps	(Gls)
–	Puerto Rico	15	(0)
Medal record
Women's handball
Representing Puerto Rico
Nor.Ca. Championship
Gold medal – first place	2017 Puerto Rico
Gold medal – first place	2021 United States
Caribbean Cup
Silver medal – second place	2017 Colombia

Zugeily Soto (born 9 October 1996) is a Puerto Rican handball player who plays for the club Santa Isabel Handball. She is member of the Puerto Rican national team. She competed at the 2015 World Women's Handball Championship in Denmark.
