= Crisleydi Hernández =

Dominican Republic handball player

Personal information
- Nationality: Dominican
- Born: 10 January 1983 (age 43)
- Height: 1.78 m (5 ft 10 in)

Sport
- Sport: Handball
- Position: Central back
- Current club: Simon Bolivar Handball
National team
Years	Team	Apps
–	Dominican Republic	93
Medal record
Pan American Games
Bronze medal – third place	2011 Guadalajara	Team
Central American and Caribbean Games
Gold medal – first place	2018 Barranquilla	Team
Bronze medal – third place	2023 San Salvador	Team
Nor.Ca. Championship
Bronze medal – third place	2017 Puerto Rico
Bolivarian Games
Bronze medal – third place	2022 Valledupar	Team
Caribbean Cup
Bronze medal – third place	2017 Colombia

Crisleydi Hernández Guerrero (born 10 January 1983) is a Dominican team handball player. She plays for the club Simon Bolivar, and on the Dominican Republic national team. She competed at the 2013 World Women's Handball Championship in Serbia, where the Dominican Republic placed 23rd.
