= Suleidy Suárez =

Dominican Republic handball player

Suleidy Suarez
Personal information
- Nationality: Dominican
- Born: 8 July 1991 (age 35)
- Height: 1.68 m (5 ft 6 in)

Sport
- Sport: Handball
- Position: Goalkeeper
- Current club: Ortiz Celado
National team
| Years | Team | Apps |
| – | Dominican Republic | 0 |
Medal record
Pan American Games
| Bronze medal – third place | 2011 Guadalajara | Team |
Central American and Caribbean Games
| Gold medal – first place | 2018 Barranquilla | Team |
| Bronze medal – third place | 2023 San Salvador | Team |
Bolivarian Games
| Bronze medal – third place | 2022 Valledupar | Team |
Caribbean Cup
| Bronze medal – third place | 2017 Colombia |

Suleidy Suarez (born 8 July 1991) is a Dominican team handball player. She plays for the club Ortiz Celado, and on the Dominican Republic national team. She competed at the 2013 World Women's Handball Championship in Serbia, where the Dominican Republic placed 23rd.
