= Jailene Maldonado =

Puerto Rican handball player

Personal information
- Nationality: Puerto Rican
- Born: 15 February 1995 (age 31)
- Height: 1.79 m (5 ft 10 in)

Sport
- Sport: Handball
- Position: Right wing
- Current club: Lanzarote Zonzomas
National team
Years	Team	Apps	(Gls)
–	Puerto Rico	20	(38)
Medal record
Women's handball
Representing Puerto Rico
Central American and Caribbean Games
Silver medal – second place	2018 Barranquilla	Team
Nor.Ca. Championship
Gold medal – first place	2021 United States
Caribbean Cup
Silver medal – second place	2017 Colombia

Jailene Maldonado (born 15 February 1995) is a Puerto Rican handball player who plays for the club Fraikin Granollers. She is member of the Puerto Rican national team. She competed at the 2015 World Women's Handball Championship in Denmark.
