= Florquidia Puello =

Dominican Republic handball player

Personal information
- Nationality: Dominican
- Born: 27 July 1995 (age 31)
- Height: 1.79 m (5 ft 10 in)

Sport
- Sport: Handball
- Position: Left wing
- Current club: Simon Bolivar Handball
National team
Years	Team	Apps
–	Dominican Republic	35
Medal record
Pan American Championship
Bronze medal – third place	2013 Dominican Republic
Central American and Caribbean Games
Gold medal – first place	2018 Barranquilla	Team
Bronze medal – third place	2023 San Salvador	Team
Nor.Ca. Championship
Bronze medal – third place	2017 Puerto Rico
Bolivarian Games
Bronze medal – third place	2022 Valledupar	Team
Caribbean Cup
Bronze medal – third place	2017 Colombia

Florquidia Puello (born 27 July 1995) is a Dominican team handball player. She plays for the club Simon Bolivar, and on the Dominican Republic national team. She competed at the 2013 World Women's Handball Championship in Serbia, where the Dominican Republic placed 23rd.
