= Nancy Peña (handballer) =

Dominican Republic handball player

Personal information
- Full name: Nancy Mileidy Peña Rodríguez
- Nationality: Dominican
- Born: 29 July 1982 (age 44)
- Height: 1.62 m (5 ft 4 in)

Sport
- Sport: Handball
- Position: Left wing
- Current club: Simon Bolivar Handball
National team
Years	Team	Apps
–	Dominican Republic	94
Medal record
Pan American Games
Bronze medal – third place	2011 Guadalajara	Team
Pan American Championship
Bronze medal – third place	2007 Dominican Republic
Bronze medal – third place	2013 Dominican Republic
Central American and Caribbean Games
Gold medal – first place	2002 San Salvador	Team
Gold medal – first place	2010 Mayagüez	Team
Gold medal – first place	2018 Barranquilla	Team
Silver medal – second place	2006 Cartagena	Team
Bronze medal – third place	2023 San Salvador	Team
Nor.Ca. Championship
Bronze medal – third place	2017 Puerto Rico
Bolivarian Games
Bronze medal – third place	2022 Valledupar	Team
Caribbean Cup
Silver medal – second place	2013 Dominican Republic
Silver medal – second place	2022 Dominican Republic
Bronze medal – third place	2017 Colombia

For the French comics writer and illustrator, see Nancy Peña (comics writer).

Nancy Peña (born 29 July 1982) is a Dominican team handball player. She plays for the club Simon Bolivar, and on the Dominican Republic national team. She competed at the 2013 World Women's Handball Championship in Serbia, where the Dominican Republic placed 23rd.

== Individual Achiviements ==
- All star team: Left wing:
  - 2013 Pan American Women's Handball Championship
