= Cari Domínguez =

Cari Domínguez may refer to:

- Cari M. Dominguez, Chair of the U.S. Equal Employment Opportunity Commission
- Cari Domínguez (handballer) (born 1992), Dominican handball player
