= 2021 Nor.Ca. Women's Handball Championship =

Tournament details
- Host country: United States
- Venue: 1 (in 1 host city)
- Dates: 22–25 August
- Teams: 4 (from 1 confederation)

Final positions
- Champions: Puerto Rico (2nd title)
- Runners-up: Greenland
- Third place: Mexico
- Fourth place: United States

Tournament statistics
- Matches played: 8
- Goals scored: 402 (50.25 per match)
- Attendance: 0 (0 per match)
- Top scorers: (Puerto Rico) Nathalys Ceballos (24 goals)

Awards
- Best player: (Puerto Rico) Sheila Hiraldo

‌The 2021 Nor.Ca. Women's Handball Championship was the fourth edition of the championship, held from 22 to 27 August 2021 at Elgin, United States under the aegis of North America and Caribbean Handball Confederation. It was the first time in history that the championship is organised by the USA Team Handball. It also acted as the qualification tournament for the 2021 World Women's Handball Championship, with the top team from the championship directly qualifying for the event to be held in Spain. The tournament was held behind closed doors, due to the COVID-19 pandemic.

Puerto Rico won the final 34–24 against Greenland, to capture their second title.

== Teams ==
Four teams participated.

- Greenland
- Mexico
- Puerto Rico
- United States

== Referees ==
The following four referee pairs were selected.

Referees
France	Yann Carmaux; Julien Mursch
Greenland	Enok Petersen; Erni Johansen
Mexico	Juan Castro; Omar García
United States	Rafael Marques; Kevin Poulet

== Preliminary round ==
=== Standings ===
Pos	Team	Pld	W	D	L	GF	GA	GD	Pts	Qualification
1	Greenland	3	3	0	0	87	68	+19	6	Final
2	Puerto Rico	3	2	0	1	80	70	+10	4	Final
3	Mexico	3	1	0	2	76	83	−7	2	Third place game
4	United States (H)	3	0	0	3	59	81	−22	0	Third place game

Source: TeamUSA
Rules for classification: 1) points; 2) head-to-head points; 3) head-to-head goal difference; 4) head-to-head number of goals scored; 5) goal difference.
(H) Hosts

=== Fixtures ===
22 August 2021; 17:00	Puerto Rico	28–20	United States	The Centre of Elgin, Elgin; Referees: Carmaux, Mursch (FRA)
22 August 2021; 17:00	Graciani 6	(14–8)	Carvalho, Lima 4	The Centre of Elgin, Elgin; Referees: Carmaux, Mursch (FRA)
22 August 2021; 17:00	2× (suspension)	Report	1× (yellow card) 8× (suspension)	The Centre of Elgin, Elgin; Referees: Carmaux, Mursch (FRA)

22 August 2021; 19:00	Greenland	33–27	Mexico	The Centre of Elgin, Elgin; Referees: Marques, Poulet (USA)
22 August 2021; 19:00	Heilmann 7	(17–12)	Leal 8	The Centre of Elgin, Elgin; Referees: Marques, Poulet (USA)
22 August 2021; 19:00	2× (yellow card) 6× (suspension) 1× (red card)	Report	2× (suspension)	The Centre of Elgin, Elgin; Referees: Marques, Poulet (USA)

23 August 2021; 17:00	Mexico	24–29	Puerto Rico	The Centre of Elgin, Elgin; Referees: Petersen, Johansen (GRL)
23 August 2021; 17:00	Arriaga 6	(10–15)	Fuentes 7	The Centre of Elgin, Elgin; Referees: Petersen, Johansen (GRL)
23 August 2021; 17:00	3× (suspension)	Report	1× (yellow card) 5× (suspension)	The Centre of Elgin, Elgin; Referees: Petersen, Johansen (GRL)

23 August 2021; 19:00	United States	18–28	Greenland	The Centre of Elgin, Elgin; Referees: Castro, García (MEX)
23 August 2021; 19:00	Nesper 5	(10–11)	Hansen 9	The Centre of Elgin, Elgin; Referees: Castro, García (MEX)
23 August 2021; 19:00	1× (yellow card) 3× (suspension) 1× (red card)	Report	2× (yellow card) 3× (suspension)	The Centre of Elgin, Elgin; Referees: Castro, García (MEX)

24 August 2021; 17:00	Greenland	26–23	Puerto Rico	The Centre of Elgin, Elgin; Referees: Castro, García (MEX)
24 August 2021; 17:00	Kajangmat 7	(10–8)	Fuentes, Hiraldo 4	The Centre of Elgin, Elgin; Referees: Castro, García (MEX)
24 August 2021; 17:00	1× (yellow card) 5× (suspension)	Report	1× (yellow card) 2× (suspension)	The Centre of Elgin, Elgin; Referees: Castro, García (MEX)

24 August 2021; 19:00	United States	21–25	Mexico	The Centre of Elgin, Elgin; Referees: Carmaux, Mursch (FRA)
24 August 2021; 19:00	Carvalho, Christensen 4	(12–14)	Gallegos 6	The Centre of Elgin, Elgin; Referees: Carmaux, Mursch (FRA)
24 August 2021; 19:00	2× (suspension)	Report	3× (suspension)	The Centre of Elgin, Elgin; Referees: Carmaux, Mursch (FRA)

== Knockout stage ==
=== Third place game ===
25 August 2021; 17:00	Mexico	28–14	United States	The Centre of Elgin, Elgin; Referees: Petersen, Johansen (GRL)
25 August 2021; 17:00	Leal 6	(13–5)	Taylor 4	The Centre of Elgin, Elgin; Referees: Petersen, Johansen (GRL)
25 August 2021; 17:00	2× (yellow card)	Report	1× (yellow card) 2× (suspension)	The Centre of Elgin, Elgin; Referees: Petersen, Johansen (GRL)

=== Final ===
25 August 2021; 19:00	Greenland	24–34	Puerto Rico	The Centre of Elgin, Elgin; Referees: Carmaux, Mursch (FRA)
25 August 2021; 19:00	Holm 7	(10–18)	Ceballos 10	The Centre of Elgin, Elgin; Referees: Carmaux, Mursch (FRA)
25 August 2021; 19:00	2× (yellow card) 3× (suspension)	Report	1× (yellow card) 2× (suspension)	The Centre of Elgin, Elgin; Referees: Carmaux, Mursch (FRA)

== Final standing ==
Rank	Team
1st place, gold medalist(s)	Puerto Rico
2nd place, silver medalist(s)	Greenland
3rd place, bronze medalist(s)	Mexico
4	United States

Team qualified for the 2021 World Women's Handball Championship

== All Star Team ==
The all-star team was announced on 25 August 2021.

Position	Player
Goalkeeper	(United States) Sophie Fasold
Right wing	(Puerto Rico) Jailene Maldonado
Right back	(Greenland) Josephine Gardaard
Centre back	(Puerto Rico) Nathanys Ceballos
Left back	(Greenland) Lykke Frank Hansen
Left wing	(Puerto Rico) Zuleika Fuentes
Pivot	(Puerto Rico) Ivana Holm
MVP	(Puerto Rico) Sheila Hiraldo

== Squads ==
=== Greenland ===
Head coach: Johannes Groth

No.	Pos.	Name	Date of birth (age)	Height	App.	Goals	Club
2		Nuunu M Lukassen					(Greenland) N-48
3		Aviaaja Heilmann					(Greenland) GSS
4		Anja Heilmann					(Greenland) GSS
5		Ivana Meincke					(Greenland) N-48
6	P	Ivaana Holm	16 July 1990 (aged 31)	170 cm			(Greenland) GSS
7		Aviana Kajangmat					(Greenland) NÛK
8		Pilunnguaq R. Wille					(Greenland) NÛK
9		Josephine Gadgaard					(Greenland) GSS
10		Christina V lange					(Greenland) NÛK
12		Rina Lorentzen					(Greenland) NÛK
13		Ivalu Bjerge					(Denmark) Holstebro Håndbold
14		Kathrine Mikkelsen					(Denmark) Silkeborg-Voel KFUM
15	P	Sandra Rothberg		186 cm			(Denmark) Nykøbing Falster Håndboldklub
16		Nivi Fly					(Greenland) GSS
17	LB	Lykke Frank Hansen	8 January 1988 (aged 33)	1.80 m			(Denmark) Nykøbing Falster Håndboldklub
14		Gerdaaraq I. Geisler					(Greenland) N-48

=== Mexico ===
Head coach: ?

No.	Pos.	Name	Date of birth (age)	Height	App.	Goals	Club
1		Adela Valenzuela
2		Gemma Leal
5		Ana Hernandez
10		Fernanda Rivera
11		Sayra Pereira
12		Itzel Vargas
13		Jaqueline Lopez
14		Cinthia Gallegos
16		Nataly Gonzalez
17		Tamara Robles
25		Lucero Quezada
55		Debanhy Arriaga

=== Puerto Rico ===
Head coach: Camilo Estevez

No.	Pos.	Name	Date of birth (age)	Height	App.	Goals	Club
1	GK	Kitsa Escobar	1 December 1990 (aged 31)	1.58 m
2	RB	Adriana Cabrera	23 November 1992 (aged 29)	1.71 m
5	CB	Nathalys Ceballos	10 March 1990 (aged 31)	1.52 m
6	CB	Sheila Hiraldo	21 April 1989 (aged 32)	1.58 m
8	LW	Joane Vergara	25 August 1990 (aged 31)	1.58 m
11	LW	Alanis Benítez	28 October 1997 (aged 24)	1.58 m
12	GK	Roxanalis Carrasquillo	21 October 1990 (aged 31)	1.60 m
13	LB	Cyolimar Ortíz	10 August 2004 (aged 17)	1.64 m
15	RW	Jailene Maldonado	15 February 1995 (aged 26)	1.76 m
16	GK	Zugeily Soto	10 September 1996 (aged 25)	1.78 m
17	RB	Ericka Graciani	4 April 1996 (aged 25)	1.68 m
18	P	Ciris García	9 January 1991 (aged 30)	1.77 m
21	LB	Nastasha Escobar	30 April 2003 (aged 18)	1.76 m
22	LW	Zuleika Fuentes	29 June 1993 (aged 28)	1.58 m
23	P	Lizabeth Rodríguez	17 November 1992 (aged 29)	1.64 m
24	LW	Robeliz Ortíz	12 January 1995 (aged 26)	1.58 m

=== United States ===
Head coach: Julio Sainz

No.	Pos.	Name	Date of birth (age)	Height	App.	Goals	Club
1	GK	Sophie Fasold	2 January 1994 (aged 27)	1.73 m			(Germany) TSV Nord Harrislee
2	CB	Cecile Brown	20	1.68 m			(Norway) IL ROS
3	LW	Maria Vallone	17 May 1991 (aged 30)	1.70 m			(United States) Rogue Handball
4	P	Sarah Gascon	12 January 1982 (aged 39)	1.73 m			(United States) Rogue Handball
7	CB	Binta Carvalho	30	1.73 m			(United States) Boston THC
8	RW	Saga Nordin	2 February 2001 (aged 20)	1.68 m			(Norway) TIF Viking
9	CB	Kathy Darling	24 August 1981 (aged 39)	1.88 m			(United States) Rogue Handball
11	LW	Julia Taylor	4 December 1989 (aged 31)	1.73 m			(France) SC Draveil Handball
12	GK	Sanna Wheeler	24 August 2001 (aged 19)	1.80 m			(Norway) Oppegård IL
13	P	Karen Schultze	2 December 1999 (aged 21)	1.80 m			(Germany) ASV Schwarz-Rot 06 e.V.
14	CB	Gabrielle Martin	17	1.70 m			(Canada) Celtique Handball Club
15	CB	Emma Ready	17	1.63 m			(Norway) Vikhammer HK
18	LW	Moa Liberty Bengtsson	17	1.78 m			(Sweden) Kärra HF
22	P	Bruna Lima	29	1.75 m			(United States) Boston THC
23	CB	Sif Skov Christiansen	19	1.80 m			(Denmark) Hillerød Håndbold Klub
26	CB	Teasia Stewart	23	1.63 m			(United States) West Point Team Handball
44	RW	Eden Nesper	16	1.63 m			(Germany) TV Hannover-Badenstedt
88	GK	Emily Myrmo	20	1.75 m			(Norway) Bærum Topphåndball
