= Sheila Hiraldo =

Puerto Rican handball player

Sheila Hiraldo Cepeda
Personal information
- Nationality: Puerto Rican
- Born: 21 April 1989 (age 37)
- Height: 1.63 m (5 ft 4 in)

Sport
- Sport: Handball
- Position: Left back
- Current club: IHC Intrèpide Handball Club Guadalupe Handball
National team
Years	Team	Apps	(Gls)
–	Puerto Rico	38	(117)
Medal record
Women's handball
Representing Puerto Rico
Central American and Caribbean Games
Silver medal – second place	2018 Barranquilla	Team
Silver medal – second place	2023 San Salvador	Team
Nor.Ca. Championship
Gold medal – first place	2017 Puerto Rico
Gold medal – first place	2021 United States

Sheila Hiraldo (born 21 April 1989) is a Puerto Rican handball player who plays for the club Guadalupe Handball. She is member of the Puerto Rican national team. She competed at the 2015 World Women's Handball Championship in Denmark.
