= Johanna Pimentel =

Dominican Republic handball player

Personal information
- Nationality: Dominican
- Born: 20 April 1992 (age 34)
- Height: 1.90 m (6 ft 3 in)

Sport
- Sport: Handball
- Position: Right back
- Current club: Ortiz Celado
National team
Years	Team	Apps
–	Dominican Republic	80
Medal record
Pan American Games
Bronze medal – third place	2011 Guadalajara	Team
Pan American Championship
Bronze medal – third place	2013 Dominican Republic
Central American and Caribbean Games
Gold medal – first place	2018 Barranquilla	Team
Bronze medal – third place	2023 San Salvador	Team
Nor.Ca. Championship
Bronze medal – third place	2017 Puerto Rico

Johanna Pimentel (born 20 April 1992) is a Dominican team handball player. She plays for the club Ortiz Celado, and on the Dominican Republic national team. She competed at the 2013 World Women's Handball Championship in Serbia, where the Dominican Republic placed 23rd.

== Individual Awards and recognitions ==
- 2017 Nor.Ca. Women's Handball Championship: All Star Team Right Back
