= Cari Domínguez (handballer) =

Dominican Republic handball player

Cari Dominguez
Personal information
- Nationality: Dominican
- Born: 10 October 1992 (age 34)
- Height: 1.74 m (5 ft 9 in)

Sport
- Sport: Handball
- Position: Goalkeeper
- Current club: Maquiteria Handball
National team
Years	Team	Apps
–	Dominican Republic	0
Medal record
Pan American Games
Bronze medal – third place	2011 Guadalajara	Team
Pan American Championship
Bronze medal – third place	2013 Dominican Republic
Central American and Caribbean Games
Gold medal – first place	2010 Mayagüez	Team
Gold medal – first place	2018 Barranquilla	Team
Nor.Ca. Championship
Bronze medal – third place	2017 Puerto Rico
Caribbean Cup
Bronze medal – third place	2017 Colombia
- Updated on 7 December 2013

Cari Dominguez (born 10 October 1992) is a Dominican handball player for Maquiteria Handball and the Dominican Republic national team.
