= Niurkis Mora =

Cuban handball player (born 1994)

Personal information
- Full name: Niurkis Mora Arias
- Nationality: Cuban
- Born: 6 October 1994 (age 32)
- Height: 1.78 m (5 ft 10 in)

Sport
- Sport: Handball
- Position: Goalkeeper
- Current club: Santiago de Cuba
National team
Years	Team	Apps	(Gls)
–	Cuba	43	(7)
Medal record
Pan American Games
Bronze medal – third place	2019 Lima	Team
Pan American Championship
Silver medal – second place	2015 Cuba
Central American and Caribbean Games
Gold medal – first place	2023 San Salvador	Team
Bronze medal – third place	2018 Barranquilla	Team

Niurkis Mora Arias (born 6 October 1994) is a Cuban handball player for Santiago de Cuba and the Cuban national team.

She competed at the 2015 World Women's Handball Championship in Denmark.

== Individual Awards and recognitions ==
- 2017 Caribbean Handball Cup: All Star Team Goalkeeper
