= Miroslav Vujasinović =

Dominican handball coach

Miroslav Vujasinović is a Dominican handball coach of the Dominican national team.
