= Eyatne Rizo =

Cuban handball player (born 1995)

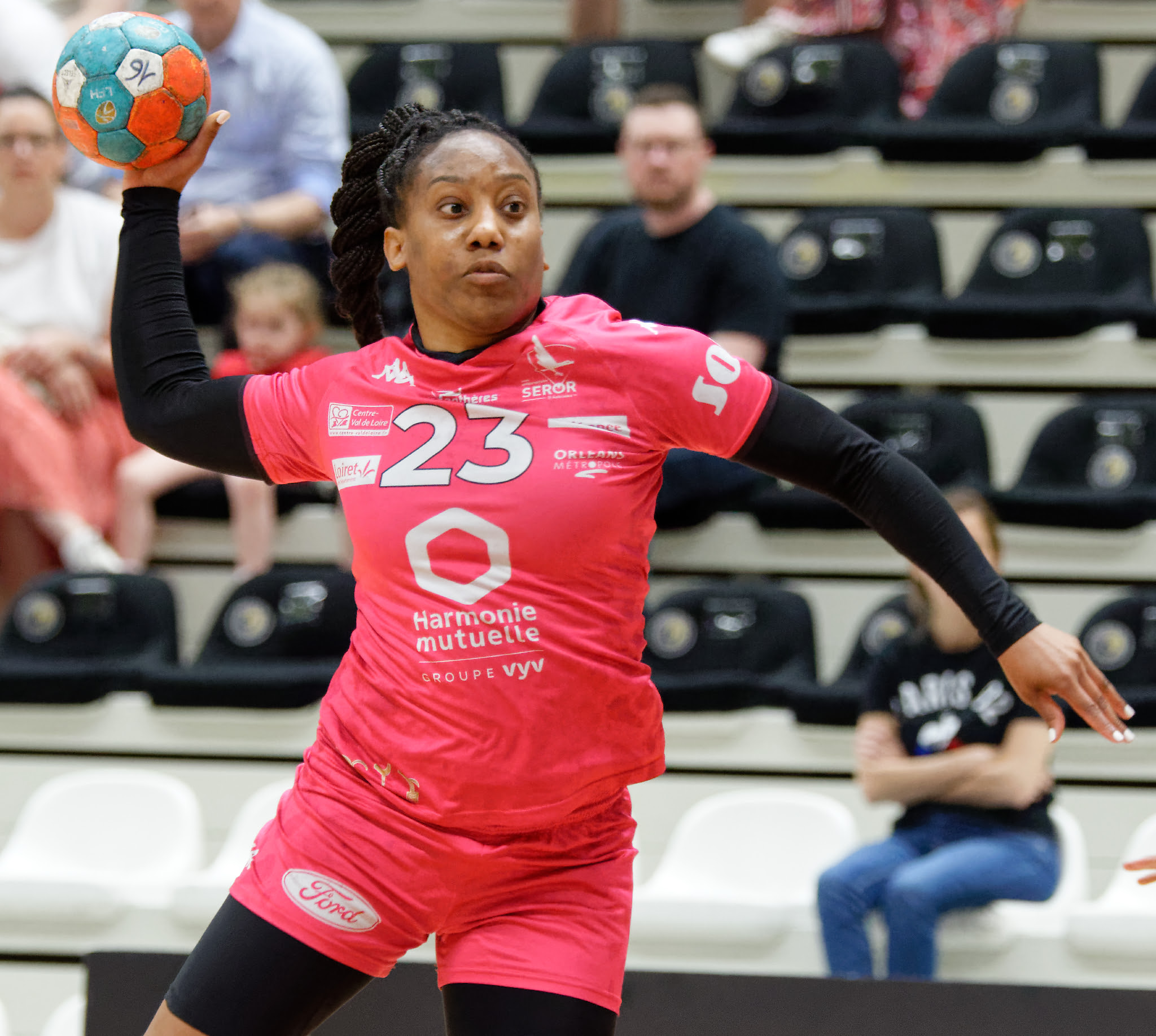
- Eyatne Rizo Gomez (2022)

Personal information
- Full name: Eyatne Rizo Gómez
- Born: 18 October 1995 (age 31) Havana, Cuba
- Height: 1.65 m (5 ft 5 in)

Sport
- Sport: Handball
- Position: Centre back
- Current club: Fleury Loiret HB
- Number: 23
National team
| Years | Team | Apps | (Gls) |
| – | Cuba | 39 | (106) |
Medal record
Pan American Games
| Bronze medal – third place | 2019 Lima | Team |
Pan American Championship
| Silver medal – second place | 2015 Cuba |
Central American and Caribbean Games
| Bronze medal – third place | 2018 Barranquilla | Team |
Nor.Ca. Championship
| Gold medal – first place | 2015 Puerto Rico |

Eyatne Rizo Gómez (born 18 October 1995) is a Cuban handball player for Fleury Loiret HB and the Cuban national team.

She competed at the 2015 World Women's Handball Championship in Denmark.

== Awards and achievements ==
- 2015 Pan American Women's Handball Championship: All Star Team Playmaker
