= Ciris García =

Puerto Rican handball player

Personal information
- Nationality: Puerto Rican
- Born: September 1, 1989 (age 37)
- Height: 1.73 m (5 ft 8 in)

Sport
- Sport: Handball
- Position: Pivot
- Current club: Ardeşen GSK

Senior clubs
- Years: Team
- 2017–: Ardeşen GSK
National team
Years	Team	Apps	(Gls)
–	Puerto Rico	38	(170)
Medal record
Women's handball
Representing Puerto Rico
Central American and Caribbean Games
Silver medal – second place	2018 Barranquilla	Team
Silver medal – second place	2023 San Salvador	Team
Nor.Ca. Championship
Gold medal – first place	2021 United States
Gold medal – first place	2017 Puerto Rico
Silver medal – second place	2019 Mexico
Caribbean Cup
Silver medal – second place	2017 Colombia

Ciris García (born September 1, 1989) is a Puerto Rican handball player who plays for the club Guadalupe Handball. She is member of the Puerto Rican national team. She competed at the 2015 World Women's Handball Championship in Denmark.

In 2017 she won the North American and Caribbean Championship. She was the tournament topscorer and included in the all-star team.

== Individual Awards and recognitions ==
- 2017 Nor.Ca. Women's Handball Championship: Top scorer
- 2017 Nor.Ca. Women's Handball Championship: All Star Team Pivot
- 2017 Caribbean Handball Cup: All Star Team Pivot
