= Zuleika Fuentes =

Puerto Rican handball player

Personal information
- Nationality: Puerto Rican
- Born: 29 June 1993 (age 33)
- Height: 1.58 m (5 ft 2 in)

Sport
- Sport: Handball
- Position: Left wing
- Current club: Rio Grande Handball
National team
Years	Team	Apps	(Gls)
–	Puerto Rico	12	(20)
Medal record
Women's handball
Representing Puerto Rico
Central American and Caribbean Games
Silver medal – second place	2018 Barranquilla	Team
Silver medal – second place	2023 San Salvador	Team
Nor.Ca. Championship
Gold medal – first place	2017 Puerto Rico
Gold medal – first place	2021 United States
Caribbean Cup
Silver medal – second place	2017 Colombia

Zuleika Fuentes (born 29 June 1993) is a Puerto Rican handball player who plays for the club Rio Grande Handball. She is member of the Puerto Rican national team. She competed at the 2015 World Women's Handball Championship in Denmark.

In 2017 she won the North American and Caribbean Championship, and was included in the all-star team.

== Honors ==
- 2017 Nor.Ca. Women's Handball Championship: All Star Team left wing
- 2017 Caribbean Handball Cup: All Star Team left wing
- Handball at the 2018 Central American and Caribbean Games: Top scorer
