= Lykke Frank Hansen =

Greenlandic handball player (born 1988)

Personal information
- Full name: Lykke Catrine Frank Hansen
- Nationality: Greenlandic; Danish
- Born: 8 January 1988 (age 38) Nuuk, Greenland
- Height: 180 cm (71 in)

Sport
- Sport: Handball
- Position: Left back
- Current club: Fredericia HK
- Number: 17

Senior clubs
- Years: Team
- 2017-2018: GSS Håndbold
- 2019-2022: Nykøbing Falster HK
- 2023-2024: Fredericia HK
National team
Years	Team	Apps	(Gls)
–	Greenland	24	(37)
Medal record
Nor.Ca. Championship
Silver medal – second place	2021 United States	{{{2}}}
- Updated on 27 August 2021

Lykke Frank Hansen (born 8 January 1988) is a Greenlandic handballer for Fredericia HK and the Greenlandic national team.

In 2021 Johannes Groth nominated her for the 2021 Nor.Ca. Women's Handball Championship. In 2023 she represented Greenland at the 2023 World Women's Handball Championship, where Greenland finished in last place, 32 out of 32. This was Greenlands second ever appearance at a world championship.

She joined Fredericia HK in 2023. The season before she joined the club had secured promotion to the Danish 1st Division, the second tier of Danish handball. She has previously played in the Danish Women's Handball League for Nykøbing Falster Håndboldklub between 2019 and 2022.

== Statistics ==
Saison	Team	Competition	Games	Goals
2019/20	DNK Nykøbing Falster Håndboldklub	EHF Cup *1)	2	0
2020/21	DNK Nykøbing Falster Håndboldklub	EHF European League	2	1
Total:		Women's EHF European League	4	1

*1) Renamed to EHF European League
