= Yacaira Tejeda =

Dominican Republic handball player

Yacaira Alexandra Tejeda Peña
Personal information
- Nationality: Dominican
- Born: 20 August 1992 (age 34)
- Height: 1.75 m (5 ft 9 in)

Sport
- Sport: Handball
- Position: Pivot

Senior clubs
- Years: Team
- 2010–2012: BM Gijón
- 2012–2013: CB Salud
- 2013–2015: BM Adesal Córdoba
- 2015–2017: BM Remudas
National team
| Years | Team | Apps |
| – | Dominican Republic | 90 |
Medal record
Pan American Games
| Bronze medal – third place | 2011 Guadalajara | Team |
Pan American Championship
| Bronze medal – third place | 2013 Dominican Republic |
Central American and Caribbean Games
| Bronze medal – third place | 2023 San Salvador | Team |

Yacaira Tejeda (born 20 August 1992) is a Dominican team handball player. She plays for the club Parque del Este, and on the Dominican Republic national team. She represented Dominican Republic at the 2013 World Women's Handball Championship in Serbia, where Dominican Republic placed 23rd.
