= Nathalys Ceballos =

Puerto Rican handball player

Personal information
- Nationality: Puerto Rican
- Born: March 10, 1990 (age 36)
- Height: 1.51 m (4 ft 11 in)

Sport
- Sport: Handball
- Position: Centre back
- Current club: Rio Grande Handball
National team
Years	Team	Apps	(Gls)
–	Puerto Rico	38	(151)
Medal record
Women's handball
Representing Puerto Rico
Central American and Caribbean Games
Silver medal – second place	2018 Barranquilla	Team
Silver medal – second place	2023 San Salvador	Team
Nor.Ca. Championship
Gold medal – first place	2017 Puerto Rico
Gold medal – first place	2021 United States
Caribbean Cup
Silver medal – second place	2017 Colombia

Nathalys Ceballos (born March 10, 1990) is a Puerto Rican handball player who plays for the club Rio Grande Handball. She is a member of the Puerto Rican national team. Ceballos competed at the 2015 World Women's Handball Championship in Denmark.

In 2017 she won the North American and Caribbean Championship, and was included in the all-star team.

== Individual awards and recognitions ==
- 2015 Pan American Women's Handball Championship: All Star Team Right Back
- 2015 Pan American Games: 3rd top scorer with 34 goals
- 2017 Nor.Ca. Women's Handball Championship: All Star Team Center Back
