= Camilo Estévez (handball) =

Puerto Rican handball coach (born 1970)

Camilo Ernesto Estévez Muiña (born February 14, 1970) is a Puerto Rican handball coach of the Puerto Rican women's national team.

He coached them at the 2015 World Women's Handball Championship, which was the first participation at a world championship for Puerto Rico. They finished 20th of 24. He coached them again at the 2021 World Women's Handball Championship.

He addition he has also coached the Puerto Rico U17 Beach Handball team.
