= Colombia women's national handball team =

Colombia

Information
- Association: Federacion Colombiana de Balomano
- Coach: Mónica Ospina

Colours
1st	2nd

Results

Pan American Championship
- Appearances: 3 (First in 1999)
- Best result: 6th (1999, 2000)
- Last updated on Unknown.

The Colombia women's national handball team is the national team of Colombia. It is governed by the Federacion Colombiana de Balomano and takes part in international handball competitions.

== Results ==
=== Pan American Championship ===
Year	Round	Position	GP	W	D*	L	GS	GA
(Argentina) 1999	round robin	6th	5	0	0	5	58	226
(Brazil) 2000	round robin	6th	5	0	0	5	63	148
(Argentina) 2017	9th place match	9th	5	1	0	4	95	165

=== Junior Pan American Games ===
Games	Round	Position	Pld	W	D	L	GF	GA
(Colombia) 2021 Cali	7th place game	7th	5	1	0	4	124	178

=== Central American and Caribbean Games ===
Games	Round	Position	Pld	W	D	L	GF	GA
(Colombia) 2018 Barranquilla	5th place game	6th	5	2	0	3	93	117
(El Salvador) 2023 San Salvador	5th place game	5th	5	3	0	2	165	149

=== Caribbean Handball Cup ===
Year	Round	Position	GP	W	D*	L	GS	GA
(Colombia) 2017	6th place match	6	6	0	0	6	126	189

=== Bolivarian Games ===
Games	Round	Position	Pld	W	D	L	GF	GA
(Colombia) 2017 Santa Marta	round robin	4th	5	2	0	3	149	107
(Colombia) 2022 Valledupar/Chía	Bronze medal match	4th	3	1	0	2	75	78

=== World Championship qualification tournament ===
Tournament	Outcome	Position	Pld	W	D	L	GF	GA
(Colombia) 2025	not qualified	2nd	2	1	0	1	61	45
