= Mariela Andino =

Dominican handball player

Personal information
- Nationality: Dominican
- Born: 9 October 1992 (age 34)
- Height: 1.68 m (5 ft 6 in)

Sport
- Sport: Handball
- Position: Right wing
- Current club: Maquiteria Handball
National team
Years	Team	(Gls)
–	Dominican Republic	(90)
Medal record
Pan American Games
Bronze medal – third place	2011 Guadalajara	Team
Pan American Championship
Bronze medal – third place	2013 Dominican Republic
Central American and Caribbean Games
Bronze medal – third place	2023 San Salvador	Team
Bolivarian Games
Bronze medal – third place	2022 Valledupar	Team

Mariela Andino (born 9 October 1992) is a Dominican team handball player. She plays for the club Maquiteria, and on the Dominican Republic national team. She competed at the 2013 World Women's Handball Championship in Serbia, where the Dominican Republic placed 23rd.
