= Yojaver Brito =

Dominican Republic handball player

Personal information
- Nationality: Dominican
- Born: 3 December 1995 (age 30)
- Height: 1.59 m (5 ft 3 in)

Sport
- Sport: Handball
- Position: Left back
- Current club: Simon Bolivar Handball
National team
Years	Team	(Gls)
–	Dominican Republican	(25)
Medal record
Pan American Championship
Bronze medal – third place	2013 Dominican Republic
Central American and Caribbean Games
Gold medal – first place	2018 Barranquilla	Team
Bronze medal – third place	2023 San Salvador	Team
Nor.Ca. Championship
Bronze medal – third place	2017 Puerto Rico
- Updated on 7 December 2013

Yojaver Brito (born 3 December 1995) is a Dominican handball player for Simon Bolivar Handball and the Dominican Republic national team.

== Individual Awards and recognitions ==
- 2017 Nor.Ca. Women's Handball Championship: All Star Team Right Wing
