= Venezuela women's national handball team =

National women's handball team of Venezuela

Venezuela

Information
- Association: Federacion Venezolana de Balonmano

Colours
1st	2nd

Results

Pan American Championship
- Appearances: 3 (First in 2011)
- Best result: 7th (2013)
- Last updated on Unknown.

The Venezuela women's national handball team is the national team of Venezuela. It is governed by the Federacion Venezolana de Balonmano and takes part in international handball competitions.

== Results ==
=== Pan American Championship ===
Year	Round	Position	GP	W	D*	L	GS	GA
(Brazil) 2011	7th place match	8th	4	0	0	4	94	155
(Dominican Republic) 2013	7th place match	7th	6	2	0	4	176	197
(Cuba) 2015	11th place match	11th	7	1	2	4	173	191

=== Caribbean Handball Cup ===
Year	Round	Position	GP	W	D*	L	GS	GA
(Colombia) 2017	6th place match	5	6	3	1	2	151	150

=== Bolivarian Games ===
Games	Round	Position	Pld	W	D	L	GF	GA
(Colombia) 2017 Santa Marta	round robin	3rd	5	3	0	2	199	104
(Colombia) 2022 Valledupar/Chía	5th place match	5th	4	2	0	2	115	125
