= Dominican Republic women's national handball team =

Dominican Republic

Information
- Association: Dominican Republic Handball Federation
- Coach: Félix Romero

Colours
1st	2nd

Results

World Championship
- Appearances: 2 (First in 2007)
- Best result: 22nd (2007)

Pan American Championship
- Appearances: 7 (First in 2003)
- Best result: 3rd (2007, 2013)
- Last updated on Unknown.

Dominican Republic women's national handball team
Medal record

Pan American Games
Bronze medal – third place	2011 Guadalajara	Team

The Dominican Republic women's national handball team is the national handball team of Dominican Republic and is governed by the Dominican Republic Handball Federation.

The team won the Bronze medal at the 2011 Pan American Games held in Guadalajara, Mexico.

== Results ==
=== World Championship ===
- 2007 – 22nd
- 2013 – 23rd

=== Pan American Championship ===
Year	Position	GP	W	D*	L	GS	GA
(Brazil) 2003	6th	4	1	0	3	84	118
(Brazil) 2005	5th	4	1	0	4	115	143
(Dominican Republic) 2007	3rd	5	3	0	2	108	130
(Chile) 2009	4th	4	0	1	3	80	117
(Brazil) 2011	6th	4	1	1	2	98	103
(Dominican Republic) 2013	3rd	6	4	0	2	160	135
(Argentina) 2017	8th	6	1	0	5	117	184

=== Central American and Caribbean Games ===
Games	Round	Position	Pld	W	D	L	GF	GA
(Colombia) 2018 Barranquilla	Gold medal game	1st	5	5	0	0	158	111
(El Salvador) 2023 San Salvador	Bronze medal game	3rd	5	4	0	1	148	125

=== Nor.Ca Championship ===
Year	Position	GP	W	D*	L	GS	GA
(Puerto Rico) 2017	3rd	5	2	1	2	116	130
(Mexico) 2019	4th	4	1	0	3	99	109

=== Caribbean Handball Cup ===
- 2013: 2nd

Year	Position	GP	W	D*	L	GS	GA
(Colombia) 2017	3rd	6	3	1	2	159	156

=== Other tournaments ===
- 2017 Women's Four Nations Tournament – 4th
- 2022 Bolivarian Games –

== Current squad ==
Roster for the 2013 World Women's Handball Championship.

Head coach: Miroslav Vujasinović

No.	Pos.	Name	Date of birth (age)	Height	App.	Goals	Club
1	GK	Cari Dominguez	10 October 1992 (aged 21)	1.74 m		0	(Dominican Republic) Maquiteria Handball
2	LB	Yojaver Brito	3 December 1997 (aged 16)	1.59 m		25	(Dominican Republic) Simon Bolivar Handball
5	LW	Devora Torreira	1 January 1991 (aged 22)	1.79 m			(Dominican Republic) Los Frailes
7	RW	Johanna Pimentel	20 April 1992 (aged 21)	1.90 m		80	(Dominican Republic) Ortiz Celado
8	LB	Nancy Peña	29 July 1982 (aged 31)	1.62 m		94	(Dominican Republic) Simon Bolivar Handball
9	RB	Mariela Andino	9 October 1992 (aged 21)	1.68 m		90	(Dominican Republic) Maquiteria Handball
10	CB	Carina Lorenzo	4 June 1997 (aged 16)	1.71 m		35	(Dominican Republic) Maquiteria Handball
11	LB	Florquidia Puello	27 July 1997 (aged 16)	1.79 m		35	(Dominican Republic) Simon Bolivar Handball
12	GK	Suleidy Suarez	8 July 1992 (aged 21)	1.68 m		0	(Dominican Republic) Ortiz Celado
13	CB	Carolina López	16 November 1993 (aged 20)	1.74 m		95	(Dominican Republic) Simon Bolivar Handball
14	P	Yacaira Tejada	20 August 1992 (aged 21)	1.75 m		90	(Dominican Republic) Parque del Este
15	LB	Mariela Cespedes	13 November 1993 (aged 20)	1.68 m		85	(Dominican Republic) Maquiteria Handball
17	W	Irina Pop	8 October 1988 (aged 25)	1.90 m		100	(Dominican Republic) Parque del Este
23	CB	Crisleydi Hernández	10 January 1983 (aged 30)	1.78 m		93	(Dominican Republic) Simon Bolivar Handball
