= Puerto Rico women's national handball team =

Puerto Rico

Information
- Nickname: Las Fieras
- Association: Federación Puertorriqueña de Balonmano
- Coach: Camilo Estevez
- Assistant coach: Dennis Santiago
- Captain: Nathalys Ceballos

Colours
1st	2nd

Results

World Championship
- Appearances: 2 (First in 2015)
- Best result: 20th (2015)

Pan American Championship
- Appearances: 3 (First in 1991)
- Best result: 4th (2015)
- Last updated on Unknown.

Puerto Rico women's national handball team
Medal record

Central American and Caribbean Games
Silver medal – second place	2010 Puerto Rico	Team
Silver medal – second place	2014 Mexico	Team
Silver medal – second place	2018 Colombia	Team
Silver medal – second place	2023 El Salvador	Team

Nor.Ca. Handball Championship
Gold medal – first place	2017 Puerto Rico	
Silver medal – second place	2019 Mexico	

The Puerto Rico women's national handball team represents Puerto Rico in international handball competitions.

== Results ==
=== World Championship ===
Year	Position	GP	W	D*	L	GS	GA
(Denmark) 2015	20th	7	1	0	6	117	269
(Spain) 2021	20th	8	2	0	6	137	343
Total	2/30	7	1	0	6	117	269

=== Pan American Championship ===
Year	Position	GP	W	D*	L	GS	GA
(Cuba) 1991	7th	4	0	0	4	23	181
(Cuba) 2015	4th	7	3	1	3	165	200
(Argentina) 2017	6th	6	3	0	3	158	164

=== Pan American Games ===
Games	Position	Pld	W	D	L	GF	GA
(Brazil) 2007 Rio de Janeiro	8th	5	0	0	5	102	137
(Mexico) 2011 Guadalajara	6th	5	2	0	3	132	142
(Canada) 2015 Toronto	6th	5	1	1	3	135	172
(Peru) 2019 Lima	6th	5	2	0	3	130	116

=== Central American and Caribbean Games ===
Games	Round	Position	Pld	W	D	L	GF	GA
(El Salvador) 2018 Barranquilla	Gold medal game	2nd	5	4	0	1	152	123
(Colombia) 2023 San Salvador	Gold medal game	2nd	5	4	0	1	174	132

=== Nor.Ca. Championship ===
Year	Position	GP	W	D*	L	GS	GA
(Puerto Rico) 2015	5th	6	1	1	4	147	182
(Puerto Rico) 2017	1st	5	3	1	1	141	128
(Mexico) 2019	2nd	4	3	0	1	112	104
(United States) 2021	1st	4	3	0	1	114	94
(Mexico) 2025	5th	4	0	0	4	94	131

=== Caribbean Handball Cup ===
- 2013 – 3rd

Year	Round	Position	GP	W	D*	L	GS	GA
(Colombia) 2017	Final	2	6	3	0	3	149	141

== Team ==
=== Current squad ===
Squad for the 2021 World Women's Handball Championship.

Head coach: Camilo Estevez

No.	Pos.	Name	Date of birth (age)	Height	App.	Goals	Club
1	GK	Kitsa Escobar	1 December 1990 (age 34)	1.58 m	30	2
2	RB	Adriana Cabrera	23 November 1992 (age 32)	1.71 m	35	63
5	CB	Nathalys Ceballos	10 March 1990 (age 35)	1.52 m	60	150
6	CB	Sheila Hiraldo	21 April 1989 (age 35)	1.58 m	75	180
8	LW	Joane Vergara	25 August 1990 (age 34)	1.58 m	29	42
11	LW	Alanis Benítez	28 October 1997 (age 27)	1.58 m	10	5
12	GK	Roxanalis Carrasquillo	21 October 1990 (age 34)	1.60 m	20	2
13	LB	Cyolimar Ortíz	10 August 2004 (age 20)	1.64 m	4	5
15	RW	Jailene Maldonado	15 February 1995 (age 30)	1.76 m	42	115
16	GK	Zugeily Soto	10 September 1996 (age 28)	1.78 m	21	1
17	RB	Ericka Graciani	4 April 1996 (age 29)	1.68 m	29	64
18	P	Ciris García	9 January 1991 (age 34)	1.77 m	75	124
21	LB	Nastasha Escobar	30 April 2003 (age 21)	1.76 m	5	10
22	LW	Zuleika Fuentes	29 June 1993 (age 31)	1.58 m	50	96
23	P	Lizabeth Rodríguez	17 November 1992 (age 32)	1.64 m	15	18
24	LW	Robeliz Ortíz	12 January 1995 (age 30)	1.58 m	2	4

=== Technical staff ===
- Head coach: Camilo Estévez
- Assistant coach: Dennis Santiago
