= 2017 Nor.Ca. Women's Handball Championship =

Tournament details
- Host country: Puerto Rico
- Venue: 1 (in 1 host city)
- Dates: 30 March – 3 April
- Teams: 4 (from 1 confederation)

Final positions
- Champions: Puerto Rico (1st title)
- Runners-up: United States
- Third place: Dominican Republic
- Fourth place: Greenland

Tournament statistics
- Matches played: 10
- Goals scored: 500 (50 per match)
- Attendance: 3,150 (315 per match)
- Top scorers: (Puerto Rico) Ciris García (31 goals)

The 2017 Nor.Ca. Women's Handball Championship was the second edition of the Nor.Ca. Women's Handball Championship. The tournament took place in Río Grande, Puerto Rico from 30 March to 3 April. It acts as the North American and Caribbean qualifying tournament for the 2017 Pan American Women's Handball Championship.

== Participating teams ==
- Dominican Republic
- Greenland
- Puerto Rico
- United States

== Preliminary round ==
Pos	Team	Pld	W	D	L	GF	GA	GD	Pts
1	United States	3	3	0	0	79	62	17	6
2	Puerto Rico	3	1	1	1	81	78	3	3
3	Dominican Republic	3	1	1	1	61	71	−10	3
4	Greenland	3	0	0	3	72	82	−10	0

All times are local (UTC−04:00).

30 March 2017; 17:30	Greenland	22–25	Dominican Republic	Cancha Néstor Milete, Rio Grande
30 March 2017; 17:30	Andreassen 5	(11–12)	Lopéz 7	Cancha Néstor Milete, Rio Grande
30 March 2017; 17:30	3× (yellow card) 5× (suspension) 1× (red card)	Report	3× (yellow card) 6× (suspension)	Cancha Néstor Milete, Rio Grande

30 March 2017; 20:00	Puerto Rico	26–28	United States	Cancha Néstor Milete, Rio Grande
30 March 2017; 20:00	Ceballos 7	(17–11)	Darling 7	Cancha Néstor Milete, Rio Grande
30 March 2017; 20:00	2× (yellow card) 4× (suspension)	Report	2× (yellow card) 1× (suspension)	Cancha Néstor Milete, Rio Grande

31 March 2017; 17:30	United States	25–23	Greenland	Cancha Néstor Milete, Rio Grande; Attendance: 200
31 March 2017; 17:30	Darling 7	(14–10)	Lyberth 7	Cancha Néstor Milete, Rio Grande; Attendance: 200
31 March 2017; 17:30	1× (yellow card) 2× (suspension)	Report	1× (yellow card) 2× (suspension)	Cancha Néstor Milete, Rio Grande; Attendance: 200

31 March 2017; 19:30	Dominican Republic	23–23	Puerto Rico	Cancha Néstor Milete, Rio Grande; Attendance: 500
31 March 2017; 19:30	López 6	(10–11)	García 9	Cancha Néstor Milete, Rio Grande; Attendance: 500
31 March 2017; 19:30	2× (yellow card) 5× (suspension)	Report	2× (yellow card) 2× (suspension)	Cancha Néstor Milete, Rio Grande; Attendance: 500

1 April 2017; 17:30	United States	26–13	Dominican Republic	Cancha Néstor Milete, Rio Grande; Attendance: 100
1 April 2017; 17:30	Butler 7	(13–5)	López, Lorenzo 4	Cancha Néstor Milete, Rio Grande; Attendance: 100
1 April 2017; 17:30	3× (yellow card) 2× (suspension)	Report	2× (yellow card) 3× (suspension)	Cancha Néstor Milete, Rio Grande; Attendance: 100

1 April 2017; 19:30	Puerto Rico	32–27	Greenland	Cancha Néstor Milete, Rio Grande; Attendance: 500
1 April 2017; 19:30	García 8	(16–12)	Salso 6	Cancha Néstor Milete, Rio Grande; Attendance: 500
1 April 2017; 19:30	3× (yellow card) 2× (suspension)	Report	2× (yellow card) 1× (suspension) 1× (red card)	Cancha Néstor Milete, Rio Grande; Attendance: 500

== Knockout stage ==
=== Bracket ===
Semifinals
2 April
United States	20
Greenland	18
2 April
Puerto Rico	32
Dominican Republic	23

Final
3 April
United States	27
Puerto Rico	28
Third place
3 April
Greenland	27
Dominican Republic	32

=== Semifinals ===
2 April 2017; 17:30	United States	20–18	Greenland	Cancha Néstor Milete, Rio Grande; Attendance: 200
2 April 2017; 17:30	Lombard 4	(10–9)	Rasmussen 4	Cancha Néstor Milete, Rio Grande; Attendance: 200
2 April 2017; 17:30	1× (yellow card) 3× (suspension)	Report	3× (yellow card) 3× (suspension) 1× (red card)	Cancha Néstor Milete, Rio Grande; Attendance: 200

2 April 2017; 19:30	Puerto Rico	32–23	Dominican Republic	Cancha Néstor Milete, Rio Grande; Attendance: 600
2 April 2017; 19:30	Fuentes 9	(16–8)	Hernández 7	Cancha Néstor Milete, Rio Grande; Attendance: 600
2 April 2017; 19:30	2× (yellow card) 2× (suspension)	Report	3× (yellow card) 6× (suspension)	Cancha Néstor Milete, Rio Grande; Attendance: 600

=== Third place game ===
3 April 2017; 17:30	Greenland	27–32	Dominican Republic	Cancha Néstor Milete, Rio Grande; Attendance: 250
3 April 2017; 17:30	Frank 6	(11–13)	Hernández 8	Cancha Néstor Milete, Rio Grande; Attendance: 250
3 April 2017; 17:30	1× (yellow card) 3× (suspension)	Report	1× (yellow card) 5× (suspension)	Cancha Néstor Milete, Rio Grande; Attendance: 250

=== Final ===
3 April 2017; 19:30	United States	27–28	Puerto Rico	Cancha Néstor Milete, Rio Grande; Attendance: 800
3 April 2017; 19:30	Darling 7	(14–16)	Ceballos 6	Cancha Néstor Milete, Rio Grande; Attendance: 800
3 April 2017; 19:30	2× (yellow card) 3× (suspension) 1× (red card)	Report	2× (yellow card) 1× (suspension) 1× (red card)	Cancha Néstor Milete, Rio Grande; Attendance: 800

== Final standing ==
Rank	Team
Gold medal	Puerto Rico
Silver medal	United States
Bronze medal	Dominican Republic
4	Greenland

Team qualified to the 2017 Pan American Women's Handball Championship

== Awards ==
All-star team

- Goalkeeper: (United States) Sophie Fasold
- Right Wing: (Dominican Republic) Yojaver Brito
- Right Back: (Dominican Republic) Johanna Pimentel
- Center Back: (Puerto Rico) Nathalys Ceballos
- Left Back: (Greenland) Lykke Frank Hansen
- Left Wing: (Puerto Rico) Zuleika Fuentes
- Pivot: (Puerto Rico) Ciris García
