= Caribbean Handball Championship =

Sports competition in the Caribbean

The Caribbean Handball Championship is the official competition for Men's and Women's national handball teams of Caribbean. In addition to crowning the Caribbean champions, the tournament also serves as a qualifying tournament for the Central American and Caribbean Games.

== Men ==
=== Summary ===
Year	Host	Final			Third place match		
Year	Host	Champion	Score	Runner-up	Third place	Score	Fourth place
2013; Details	(Dominican Republic); Santo Domingo	Dominican Republic	No playoffs	Cuba	Puerto Rico	No playoffs	Colombia
2017; Details	(Colombia); Cartagena	Puerto Rico	32 – 30	Cuba	Dominican Republic	28 – 27	Mexico
2022; Details	(Dominican Republic); Santo Domingo	Dominican Republic	27 – 25	Cuba	Mexico	28 – 21	Puerto Rico

=== Medal table ===
Rank	Nation	Gold	Silver	Bronze	Total
1	Dominican Republic	2	0	1	3
2	Puerto Rico	1	0	1	2
3	Cuba	0	3	0	3
4	Mexico	0	0	1	1
Totals (4 entries)		3	3	3	9

=== Participating nations ===
Nation	(Dominican Republic) 2013	(Colombia) 2017	(Dominican Republic) 2022	Years
Colombia	4th	5th	–	2
Cuba	2nd	2nd	2nd	3
Dominican Republic	1st	3rd	1st	3
Mexico	5th	4th	3rd	3
Puerto Rico	3rd	1st	4th	3
Venezuela	–	6th	–	1
Total	5	6	4	

== Women ==
=== Summary ===
Year	Host	Final			Third place match		
Year	Host	Champion	Score	Runner-up	Third place	Score	Fourth place
2013; Details	(Dominican Republic); Santo Domingo	Cuba	32 – 28	Dominican Republic	Puerto Rico	35 – 21	Colombia
2017; Details	(Colombia); Cartagena	Mexico	25 – 20	Puerto Rico	Dominican Republic	28 – 27	Cuba
2022; Details	(Dominican Republic); Santo Domingo	Cuba	30 – 21	Dominican Republic	Puerto Rico	37 – 25	Mexico

=== Medal table ===
Rank	Nation	Gold	Silver	Bronze	Total
1	Cuba	2	0	0	2
2	Mexico	1	0	0	1
3	Dominican Republic	0	2	1	3
4	Puerto Rico	0	1	2	3
Totals (4 entries)		3	3	3	9

=== Participating nations ===
Nation	(Dominican Republic) 2013	(Colombia) 2017	(Dominican Republic) 2022	Years
Colombia	4th	6th	–	2
Cuba	1st	4th	1st	3
Dominican Republic	2nd	3rd	2nd	3
Mexico	–	1st	4th	2
Puerto Rico	3rd	2nd	3rd	3
Venezuela	–	5th	–	1
Total	4	6	4	
