= 2017 Caribbean Handball Cup =

Handball competition

Tournament details
- Host country: Colombia
- Venue: 1 (in 1 host city)
- Dates: 24 – 29 October
- Teams: 12 (from 1 confederation)

Final positions
- Champions: Puerto Rico (men); Mexico (women)
- Runners-up: Cuba (men); Puerto Rico (women)
- Third place: Dominican Republic (men); Dominican Republic (women)
- Fourth place: Mexico (men); Cuba (women)

Tournament statistics
- Top scorers: (Venezuela) Jhonny Peñaloza (40 goals) (Venezuela) Marian Salcedo (40 goals)

Awards
- Best player: (Puerto Rico) Jorge Nazario (Mexico) Celene Cifuentes

The 2017 Caribbean Handball Cup was a Handball Event held at the city of Cartagena Colombia, from 24 to 29 October to qualify the nations of the Caribe region for the handball tournament of the 2018 Central American and Caribbean Games.

== Participating teams ==
Men

- Colombia
- Cuba
- Mexico
- Puerto Rico
- Dominican Republic
- Venezuela

Women

- Colombia
- Cuba
- Mexico
- Puerto Rico
- Dominican Republic
- Venezuela

== Medal summary ==
Event	Gold	Silver	Bronze
Men's tournament	Puerto Rico	Cuba	Dominican Republic
Women's tournament	Mexico	Puerto Rico	Dominican Republic

== Men's tournament ==
=== Qualification round ===
Team	Pld	W	D	L	GF	GA	GD	Pts
Cuba	5	5	0	0	166	118	+48	10
Puerto Rico	5	3	1	1	140	141	–1	7
Mexico	5	3	0	2	152	146	+6	6
Dominican Republic	5	0	3	2	136	139	–3	3
Venezuela	5	1	1	3	138	147	–9	3
Colombia	5	0	1	4	107	148	–41	1

Teams qualified for the gold medal match
Teams qualified for the bronze medal match

All times are local (UTC−05:00).

24 October 2017; 15:00	Puerto Rico	33–29	Mexico	Coliseo de Combate, Cartagena
24 October 2017; 15:00		(13–18)		Coliseo de Combate, Cartagena

24 October 2017; 16:00	Cuba	36–22	Venezuela	Coliseo de Combate, Cartagena
24 October 2017; 16:00		(15–10)		Coliseo de Combate, Cartagena

24 October 2017; 20:00	Dominican Republic	22–22	Colombia	Coliseo de Combate, Cartagena
24 October 2017; 20:00		(11–10)		Coliseo de Combate, Cartagena

25 October 2017; 16:00	Mexico	32–31	Dominican Republic	Coliseo de Combate, Cartagena
25 October 2017; 16:00		(14–16)		Coliseo de Combate, Cartagena

25 October 2017; 18:00	Colombia	21–35	Cuba	Coliseo de Combate, Cartagena
25 October 2017; 18:00		(12–14)		Coliseo de Combate, Cartagena

25 October 2017; 20:00	Venezuela	29–30	Puerto Rico	Coliseo de Combate, Cartagena
25 October 2017; 20:00		(11–14)		Coliseo de Combate, Cartagena

26 October 2017; 16:00	Dominican Republic	27–27	Venezuela	Coliseo de Combate, Cartagena
26 October 2017; 16:00		(16–11)		Coliseo de Combate, Cartagena

26 October 2017; 18:00	Colombia	19–29	Mexico	Coliseo de Combate, Cartagena
26 October 2017; 18:00		(8–15)		Coliseo de Combate, Cartagena

26 October 2017; 20:00	Cuba	32–17	Puerto Rico	Coliseo de Combate, Cartagena
26 October 2017; 20:00		(13–13)		Coliseo de Combate, Cartagena

27 October 2017; 16:00	Cuba	30–27	Mexico	Coliseo de Combate, Cartagena
27 October 2017; 16:00		(14–17)		Coliseo de Combate, Cartagena

27 October 2017; 18:00	Venezuela	27–20	Colombia	Coliseo de Combate, Cartagena
27 October 2017; 18:00		(15–10)		Coliseo de Combate, Cartagena

27 October 2017; 20:00	Puerto Rico	25–25	Dominican Republic	Coliseo de Combate, Cartagena
27 October 2017; 20:00		(14–16)		Coliseo de Combate, Cartagena

28 October 2017; 16:00	Mexico	35–33	Venezuela	Coliseo de Combate, Cartagena
28 October 2017; 16:00		(18–19)		Coliseo de Combate, Cartagena

28 October 2017; 18:00	Puerto Rico	35–26	Colombia	Coliseo de Combate, Cartagena
28 October 2017; 18:00		(15–11)		Coliseo de Combate, Cartagena

28 October 2017; 20:00	Dominican Republic	31–33	Cuba	Coliseo de Combate, Cartagena
28 October 2017; 20:00		(18–17)		Coliseo de Combate, Cartagena

== Final Round ==
=== 5th place match ===
29 October 2017; 12:00	Colombia	32–28	Venezuela	Coliseo de Combate, Cartagena
29 October 2017; 12:00		(20–13)		Coliseo de Combate, Cartagena

=== Bronze medal match ===
29 October 2017; 16:00	Mexico	27–28	Dominican Republic	Coliseo de Combate, Cartagena
29 October 2017; 16:00		(14–12)		Coliseo de Combate, Cartagena

=== Gold medal match ===
29 October 2017; 20:00	Cuba	30–32	Puerto Rico	Coliseo de Combate, Cartagena
29 October 2017; 20:00		(15–11)		Coliseo de Combate, Cartagena

== Final standing ==
Rank	Team
Gold medal	Puerto Rico
Silver medal	Cuba
Bronze medal	Dominican Republic
4	Mexico
5	Colombia
6	Venezuela

Teams qualified for the 2018 Central American and Caribbean Games

== All-star team ==
- Goalkeeper: (Cuba) Alejandro Romero
- Right Wing: (Dominican Republic) Jorge Montanillo
- Right Back: (Puerto Rico) Julio Baez
- Playmaker: (Mexico) Abel Villalobos
- Left Back: (Mexico) Alan Villalobos
- Left Wing: (Dominican Republic) José Sanchez
- Pivot: (Mexico) Sergio Sanchez

== Women's tournament ==
=== Qualification round ===
Team	Pld	W	D	L	GF	GA	GD	Pts
Mexico	5	4	1	0	151	119	+32	9
Puerto Rico	5	3	0	2	129	116	+13	6
Cuba	5	2	1	2	148	133	+15	5
Dominican Republic	5	2	1	2	131	129	+2	5
Venezuela	5	2	1	2	124	129	–5	5
Colombia	5	0	0	5	105	162	–57	0

Teams qualified for the gold medal match
Teams qualified for the bronze medal match

All times are local (UTC−05:00).

24 October 2017; 10:00	Puerto Rico	23–27	Mexico	Coliseo de Combate, Cartagena
24 October 2017; 10:00		(12–15)		Coliseo de Combate, Cartagena

24 October 2017; 12:00	Colombia	23–36	Cuba	Coliseo de Combate, Cartagena
24 October 2017; 12:00		(10–18)		Coliseo de Combate, Cartagena

24 October 2017; 14:00	Dominican Republic	18–21	Venezuela	Coliseo de Combate, Cartagena
24 October 2017; 14:00		(18–9)		Coliseo de Combate, Cartagena

25 October 2017; 10:00	Mexico	31–25	Cuba	Coliseo de Combate, Cartagena
25 October 2017; 10:00		(14–12)		Coliseo de Combate, Cartagena

25 October 2017; 12:00	Venezuela	21–29	Puerto Rico	Coliseo de Combate, Cartagena
25 October 2017; 12:00		(14–10)		Coliseo de Combate, Cartagena

25 October 2017; 14:00	Colombia	24–35	Dominican Republic	Coliseo de Combate, Cartagena
25 October 2017; 14:00		(8–19)		Coliseo de Combate, Cartagena

26 October 2017; 10:00	Cuba	32–23	Venezuela	Coliseo de Combate, Cartagena
26 October 2017; 10:00		(17–12)		Coliseo de Combate, Cartagena

26 October 2017; 12:00	Dominican Republic	28–22	Puerto Rico	Coliseo de Combate, Cartagena
26 October 2017; 12:00		(10–15)		Coliseo de Combate, Cartagena

26 October 2017; 14:00	Colombia	22–32	Mexico	Coliseo de Combate, Cartagena
26 October 2017; 14:00		(7–17)		Coliseo de Combate, Cartagena

27 October 2017; 10:00	Puerto Rico	27–26	Cuba	Coliseo de Combate, Cartagena
27 October 2017; 10:00		(9–14)		Coliseo de Combate, Cartagena

27 October 2017; 12:00	Dominican Republic	22–33	Mexico	Coliseo de Combate, Cartagena
27 October 2017; 12:00		(11–12)		Coliseo de Combate, Cartagena

27 October 2017; 14:00	Venezuela	31–22	Colombia	Coliseo de Combate, Cartagena
27 October 2017; 14:00		(13–11)		Coliseo de Combate, Cartagena

28 October 2017; 10:00	Mexico	28–28	Venezuela	Coliseo de Combate, Cartagena
28 October 2017; 10:00		(13–9)		Coliseo de Combate, Cartagena

28 October 2017; 12:00	Cuba	29–29	Dominican Republic	Coliseo de Combate, Cartagena
28 October 2017; 12:00		(14–13)		Coliseo de Combate, Cartagena

28 October 2017; 14:00	Puerto Rico	28–14	Colombia	Coliseo de Combate, Cartagena
28 October 2017; 14:00		(16–5)		Coliseo de Combate, Cartagena

== Final Round ==
=== 5th place match ===
29 October 2017; 10:00	Colombia	21–27	Venezuela	Coliseo de Combate, Cartagena
29 October 2017; 10:00		(9–12)		Coliseo de Combate, Cartagena

=== Bronze medal match ===
29 October 2017; 14:00	Cuba	27–28	Dominican Republic	Coliseo de Combate, Cartagena
29 October 2017; 14:00		(16–15)		Coliseo de Combate, Cartagena

=== Gold medal match ===
29 October 2017; 18:00	Mexico	25–20	Puerto Rico	Coliseo de Combate, Cartagena
29 October 2017; 18:00		(12–10)		Coliseo de Combate, Cartagena

== Final standing ==
Rank	Team
Gold medal	Mexico
Silver medal	Puerto Rico
Bronze medal	Dominican Republic
4	Cuba
5	Venezuela
6	Colombia

Teams qualified for the 2018 Central American and Caribbean Games

== All-star team ==
- Goalkeeper: (Cuba) Niurkis Mora
- Right Wing: (Cuba) Nahomy Rodriguez
- Right Back: (Mexico) Guadalupe Saavedra
- Playmaker: (Mexico) Celene Cifuentes
- Left Back: (Dominican Republic) Carolina López
- Left Wing: (Puerto Rico) Zuleika Fuentes
- Pivot: (Puerto Rico) Ciris García
