= Handball at the 2018 Central American and Caribbean Games =

- Venue: Sagrado Corazon de Jesus School Coliseum
- Location: (Colombia) Barranquilla
- Dates: 20 July – 1 August
- Nations: 9
- Teams: 8 (men); 8 (women)

Champions
- Men: Cuba
- Women: Dominican Republic

Handball competition of the 2018 Central American and Caribbean Games in Barranquilla was held from 20 July to 1 August at the Coliseo Colegio Sagrado Corazón de Jesús. The top three teams in both genders qualified to the 2019 Pan American Games.

== Medal summary ==
=== Medalists ===
Event	Gold	Silver	Bronze
Men	Cuba	Puerto Rico	Mexico
Women	Dominican Republic	Puerto Rico	Cuba

=== Medal table ===
Rank	Nation	Gold	Silver	Bronze	Total
1	Cuba (CUB)	1	0	1	2
2	Dominican Republic (DOM)	1	0	0	1
3	Puerto Rico (PUR)	0	2	0	2
4	Mexico (MEX)	0	0	1	1
Totals (4 entries)		2	2	2	6

== Qualification ==
Qualification	Date	Host	Vacancies	Men	Women
Host	11 June 2014	(Mexico) Veracruz	1	Colombia	Colombia
2017 Caribbean Cup	24–29 October 2017	(Colombia) Cartagena	4	Puerto Rico; Cuba; Dominican Republic; Mexico	Mexico; Puerto Rico; Dominican Republic; Cuba
2017 Central American Games	4–8 December 2017	(Nicaragua) Managua	3	Guatemala; Costa Rica; Honduras	Guatemala; Costa Rica; Nicaragua
Total			8		

== Men's tournament ==
All times are local (UTC−5).

=== Group stage ===
==== Group A ====
Pos	Team	Pld	W	D	L	GF	GA	GD	Pts	Qualification
1	Cuba	3	3	0	0	103	44	+59	6	Semifinals
2	Puerto Rico	3	2	0	1	71	75	−4	4	Semifinals
3	Guatemala	3	1	0	2	63	78	−15	2	5–8th place semifinals
4	Costa Rica	3	0	0	3	49	89	−40	0	5–8th place semifinals

Source: Barranquilla 2018
Rules for classification: 1) points; 2) head-to-head points; 3) head-to-head goal difference; 4) head-to-head number of goals scored; 5) goal difference.

27 July 2018; 14:00	Cuba	35–15	Costa Rica	Coliseo Colegio Sagrado Corazón de Jesús Barranquilla; Referees: Aires, Pinto (BRA)
27 July 2018; 14:00	Caballero 6	(19–8)	R. Molina, Vargas 3	Coliseo Colegio Sagrado Corazón de Jesús Barranquilla; Referees: Aires, Pinto (BRA)
27 July 2018; 14:00	2× (yellow card) 3× (suspension)	Report	3× (yellow card) 3× (suspension)	Coliseo Colegio Sagrado Corazón de Jesús Barranquilla; Referees: Aires, Pinto (BRA)

27 July 2018; 16:00	Puerto Rico	26–25	Guatemala	Coliseo Colegio Sagrado Corazón de Jesús Barranquilla; Referees: Ojeda, Zapata (COL)
27 July 2018; 16:00	Santana 6	(11–10)	V. Morales 8	Coliseo Colegio Sagrado Corazón de Jesús Barranquilla; Referees: Ojeda, Zapata (COL)
27 July 2018; 16:00	3× (yellow card) 3× (suspension) 1× (red card)	Report	1× (yellow card) 3× (suspension)	Coliseo Colegio Sagrado Corazón de Jesús Barranquilla; Referees: Ojeda, Zapata (COL)

28 July 2018; 10:00	Cuba	32–14	Guatemala	Coliseo Colegio Sagrado Corazón de Jesús Barranquilla; Referees: Coba, Osalde (MEX)
28 July 2018; 10:00	three players 4	(16–4)	Herrera, V. Morales 5	Coliseo Colegio Sagrado Corazón de Jesús Barranquilla; Referees: Coba, Osalde (MEX)
28 July 2018; 10:00	1× (suspension) 1× (red card)	Report	1× (yellow card) 1× (suspension)	Coliseo Colegio Sagrado Corazón de Jesús Barranquilla; Referees: Coba, Osalde (MEX)

28 July 2018; 12:00	Puerto Rico	30–14	Costa Rica	Coliseo Colegio Sagrado Corazón de Jesús Barranquilla; Referees: Estrada, Pineda (COL)
28 July 2018; 12:00	Santana 9	(15–5)	D. Molina 4	Coliseo Colegio Sagrado Corazón de Jesús Barranquilla; Referees: Estrada, Pineda (COL)
28 July 2018; 12:00	3× (yellow card) 5× (suspension) 1× (red card)	Report	3× (yellow card) 4× (suspension)	Coliseo Colegio Sagrado Corazón de Jesús Barranquilla; Referees: Estrada, Pineda (COL)

29 July 2018; 10:00	Guatemala	24–20	Costa Rica	Coliseo Colegio Sagrado Corazón de Jesús Barranquilla; Referees: Ojeda, Zapata (COL)
29 July 2018; 10:00	V. Morales 7	(10–7)	R. Molina 5	Coliseo Colegio Sagrado Corazón de Jesús Barranquilla; Referees: Ojeda, Zapata (COL)
29 July 2018; 10:00	3× (yellow card) 5× (suspension)	Report	2× (yellow card) 5× (suspension)	Coliseo Colegio Sagrado Corazón de Jesús Barranquilla; Referees: Ojeda, Zapata (COL)

29 July 2018; 12:00	Puerto Rico	15–36	Cuba	Coliseo Colegio Sagrado Corazón de Jesús Barranquilla; Referees: Aires, Pinto (BRA)
29 July 2018; 12:00	Mercado 4	(9–16)	Corzo 7	Coliseo Colegio Sagrado Corazón de Jesús Barranquilla; Referees: Aires, Pinto (BRA)
29 July 2018; 12:00	3× (yellow card) 9× (suspension)	Report	5× (suspension)	Coliseo Colegio Sagrado Corazón de Jesús Barranquilla; Referees: Aires, Pinto (BRA)

==== Group B ====
Pos	Team	Pld	W	D	L	GF	GA	GD	Pts	Qualification
1	Dominican Republic	3	2	0	1	104	77	+27	4 (Note: Dominican Republic 2 Pts, +3 GD; Mexico 2 Pts, +1 GD; Colombia 2 Pts, –4 GD.)	Semifinals
2	Mexico	3	2	0	1	89	74	+15	4	Semifinals
3	Colombia (H)	3	2	0	1	82	73	+9	4	5–8th place semifinals
4	Honduras	3	0	0	3	60	111	−51	0	5–8th place semifinals

Source: Barranquilla 2018
Rules for classification: 1) points; 2) head-to-head points; 3) head-to-head goal difference; 4) head-to-head number of goals scored; 5) goal difference.
(H) Hosts
Notes:

27 July 2018; 18:00	Mexico	35–21	Honduras	Coliseo Colegio Sagrado Corazón de Jesús Barranquilla; Referees: González, Prieto (URU)
27 July 2018; 18:00	Valenzuela 6	(12–7)	García 7	Coliseo Colegio Sagrado Corazón de Jesús Barranquilla; Referees: González, Prieto (URU)
27 July 2018; 18:00	1× (yellow card) 2× (suspension)	Report	2× (yellow card) 3× (suspension) 2× (red card)	Coliseo Colegio Sagrado Corazón de Jesús Barranquilla; Referees: González, Prieto (URU)

28 July 2018; 14:00	Dominican Republic	42–18	Honduras	Coliseo Colegio Sagrado Corazón de Jesús Barranquilla; Referees: Ojeda, Zapata (COL)
28 July 2018; 14:00	Manzanillo 9	(18–11)	García 9	Coliseo Colegio Sagrado Corazón de Jesús Barranquilla; Referees: Ojeda, Zapata (COL)
28 July 2018; 14:00	3× (yellow card) 4× (suspension)	Report	3× (suspension)	Coliseo Colegio Sagrado Corazón de Jesús Barranquilla; Referees: Ojeda, Zapata (COL)

28 July 2018; 16:00	Colombia	23–20	Mexico	Coliseo Colegio Sagrado Corazón de Jesús Barranquilla; Referees: Reyes, Zuñiga (CUB)
28 July 2018; 16:00	S. Restrepo 10	(14–11)	Ab. Villalobos 7	Coliseo Colegio Sagrado Corazón de Jesús Barranquilla; Referees: Reyes, Zuñiga (CUB)
28 July 2018; 16:00	2× (yellow card) 9× (suspension) 1× (red card)	Report	1× (yellow card) 6× (suspension)	Coliseo Colegio Sagrado Corazón de Jesús Barranquilla; Referees: Reyes, Zuñiga (CUB)

29 July 2018; 14:00	Dominican Republic	30–34	Mexico	Coliseo Colegio Sagrado Corazón de Jesús Barranquilla; Referees: González, Prieto (URU)
29 July 2018; 14:00	Díaz, Sánchez 7	(15–16)	Ávalos 7	Coliseo Colegio Sagrado Corazón de Jesús Barranquilla; Referees: González, Prieto (URU)
29 July 2018; 14:00	2× (yellow card) 5× (suspension)	Report	1× (yellow card) 2× (suspension)	Coliseo Colegio Sagrado Corazón de Jesús Barranquilla; Referees: González, Prieto (URU)

29 July 2018; 16:00	Colombia	34–21	Honduras	Coliseo Colegio Sagrado Corazón de Jesús Barranquilla; Referees: Coba, Osalde (MEX)
29 July 2018; 16:00	S. Restrepo 7	(15–11)	García 8	Coliseo Colegio Sagrado Corazón de Jesús Barranquilla; Referees: Coba, Osalde (MEX)
29 July 2018; 16:00	5× (yellow card) 5× (suspension)	Report	1× (yellow card) 6× (suspension) 1× (red card)	Coliseo Colegio Sagrado Corazón de Jesús Barranquilla; Referees: Coba, Osalde (MEX)

30 July 2018; 11:00	Colombia	25–32	Dominican Republic	Coliseo Colegio Sagrado Corazón de Jesús Barranquilla; Referees: Reyes, Zuñiga (CUB)
30 July 2018; 11:00	S. Restrepo 9	(12–16)	Manzanillo 10	Coliseo Colegio Sagrado Corazón de Jesús Barranquilla; Referees: Reyes, Zuñiga (CUB)
30 July 2018; 11:00	2× (yellow card) 3× (suspension)	Report	2× (yellow card) 9× (suspension)	Coliseo Colegio Sagrado Corazón de Jesús Barranquilla; Referees: Reyes, Zuñiga (CUB)

=== Fifth to eighth place classification ===
5–8th place semifinals
31 July
Costa Rica	24
Colombia	29
31 July
Guatemala	33
Honduras	28

5th place
1 August
Colombia	29
Guatemala	24
7th place
1 August
Costa Rica	31
Honduras	17

==== 5–8th place semifinals ====
31 July 2018; 10:00	Costa Rica	24–29	Colombia	Coliseo Colegio Sagrado Corazón de Jesús Barranquilla; Referees: Aires, Pinto (BRA)
31 July 2018; 10:00	P. Molina 7	(11–12)	S. Restrepo 8	Coliseo Colegio Sagrado Corazón de Jesús Barranquilla; Referees: Aires, Pinto (BRA)
31 July 2018; 10:00	2× (yellow card) 5× (suspension)	Report	2× (yellow card) 7× (suspension)	Coliseo Colegio Sagrado Corazón de Jesús Barranquilla; Referees: Aires, Pinto (BRA)

31 July 2018; 12:30	Guatemala	33–28	Honduras	Coliseo Colegio Sagrado Corazón de Jesús Barranquilla; Referees: Reyes, Zuñiga (CUB)
31 July 2018; 12:30	Luna 8	(16–12)	García 10	Coliseo Colegio Sagrado Corazón de Jesús Barranquilla; Referees: Reyes, Zuñiga (CUB)
31 July 2018; 12:30	3× (yellow card) 3× (suspension)	Report	2× (yellow card) 3× (suspension)	Coliseo Colegio Sagrado Corazón de Jesús Barranquilla; Referees: Reyes, Zuñiga (CUB)

==== Seventh place game ====
1 August 2018; 10:00	Costa Rica	31–17	Honduras	Coliseo Colegio Sagrado Corazón de Jesús Barranquilla; Referees: Estrada, Pineda (COL)
1 August 2018; 10:00	Marchena, R. Molina 8	(15–7)	Lainez, López 3	Coliseo Colegio Sagrado Corazón de Jesús Barranquilla; Referees: Estrada, Pineda (COL)
1 August 2018; 10:00	2× (yellow card) 3× (suspension)	Report	3× (yellow card) 5× (suspension)	Coliseo Colegio Sagrado Corazón de Jesús Barranquilla; Referees: Estrada, Pineda (COL)

==== Fifth place game ====
1 August 2018; 12:00	Colombia	29–24	Guatemala	Coliseo Colegio Sagrado Corazón de Jesús Barranquilla; Referees: González, Prieto (URU)
1 August 2018; 12:00	S. Restrepo 9	(17–9)	V. Morales 7	Coliseo Colegio Sagrado Corazón de Jesús Barranquilla; Referees: González, Prieto (URU)
1 August 2018; 12:00	3× (yellow card) 7× (suspension)	Report	1× (yellow card) 3× (suspension)	Coliseo Colegio Sagrado Corazón de Jesús Barranquilla; Referees: González, Prieto (URU)

=== First to fourth place classification ===
Semifinals
31 July
Cuba	40
Mexico	23
31 July
Puerto Rico	31
Dominican Republic	26

Final
1 August
Cuba	29
Puerto Rico	18
Third place
1 August
Mexico	33
Dominican Republic	32

==== Semifinals ====
31 July 2018; 14:30	Cuba	40–23	Mexico	Coliseo Colegio Sagrado Corazón de Jesús Barranquilla; Referees: Estrada, Pineda (COL)
31 July 2018; 14:30	Corzo, Valdés 6	(23–12)	Al. Villalobos 7	Coliseo Colegio Sagrado Corazón de Jesús Barranquilla; Referees: Estrada, Pineda (COL)
31 July 2018; 14:30	3× (yellow card) 5× (suspension)	Report	1× (yellow card) 1× (suspension)	Coliseo Colegio Sagrado Corazón de Jesús Barranquilla; Referees: Estrada, Pineda (COL)

31 July 2018; 16:30	Puerto Rico	31–26	Dominican Republic	Coliseo Colegio Sagrado Corazón de Jesús Barranquilla; Referees: González, Prieto (URU)
31 July 2018; 16:30	Nazario 7	(14–14)	three players 5	Coliseo Colegio Sagrado Corazón de Jesús Barranquilla; Referees: González, Prieto (URU)
31 July 2018; 16:30	1× (yellow card) 5× (suspension)	Report	4× (yellow card) 7× (suspension) 1× (red card)	Coliseo Colegio Sagrado Corazón de Jesús Barranquilla; Referees: González, Prieto (URU)

==== Third place game ====
1 August 2018; 14:00	Mexico	33–32	Dominican Republic	Coliseo Colegio Sagrado Corazón de Jesús Barranquilla; Referees: Reyes, Zuñiga (COL)
1 August 2018; 14:00	Al. Villalobos 11	(18–18)	Beras, Sánchez 7	Coliseo Colegio Sagrado Corazón de Jesús Barranquilla; Referees: Reyes, Zuñiga (COL)
1 August 2018; 14:00	2× (yellow card) 2× (suspension)	Report	1× (yellow card) 4× (suspension)	Coliseo Colegio Sagrado Corazón de Jesús Barranquilla; Referees: Reyes, Zuñiga (COL)

==== Final ====
1 August 2018; 16:00	Cuba	29–18	Puerto Rico	Coliseo Colegio Sagrado Corazón de Jesús Barranquilla; Referees: Aires, Pinto (BRA)
1 August 2018; 16:00	Corzo 6	(14–10)	Hiraldo, Nazario 4	Coliseo Colegio Sagrado Corazón de Jesús Barranquilla; Referees: Aires, Pinto (BRA)
1 August 2018; 16:00	3× (yellow card) 5× (suspension)	Report	4× (yellow card) 4× (suspension)	Coliseo Colegio Sagrado Corazón de Jesús Barranquilla; Referees: Aires, Pinto (BRA)

=== Final standing ===
Rank	Team
1st place, gold medalist(s)	Cuba
2nd place, silver medalist(s)	Puerto Rico
3rd place, bronze medalist(s)	Mexico
4	Dominican Republic
5	Colombia
6	Guatemala
7	Costa Rica
8	Honduras

Team qualified to the 2019 Pan American Games

=== Top scorers ===
Rank	Player	Goals
1	(Colombia) Sebastian Restrepo	43
2	(Honduras) Asler Garcia	36
3	(Dominican Republic) Jorge Manzanillo	32
3	(Guatemala) Victor Morales	32
5	(Mexico) Alan Villalobos	27

== Women's tournament ==
=== Group stage ===
==== Group A ====
Pos	Team	Pld	W	D	L	GF	GA	GD	Pts	Qualification
1	Puerto Rico	3	3	0	0	99	69	+30	6	Semifinals
2	Mexico	3	2	0	1	118	78	+40	4	Semifinals
3	Nicaragua	3	1	0	2	67	101	−34	2	5–8th place semifinals
4	Costa Rica	3	0	0	3	61	97	−36	0	5–8th place semifinals

Source: Barranquilla 2018
Rules for classification: 1) points; 2) head-to-head points; 3) head-to-head goal difference; 4) head-to-head number of goals scored; 5) goal difference.

20 July 2018; 14:00	Puerto Rico	39–21	Nicaragua	Coliseo Colegio Sagrado Corazón de Jesús Barranquilla; Referees: Aires, Pinto (BRA)
20 July 2018; 14:00	Maldonado 6	(20–8)	Gutiérrez, Ortega 5	Coliseo Colegio Sagrado Corazón de Jesús Barranquilla; Referees: Aires, Pinto (BRA)
20 July 2018; 14:00	3× (yellow card) 3× (suspension)	Report	1× (yellow card) 6× (suspension)	Coliseo Colegio Sagrado Corazón de Jesús Barranquilla; Referees: Aires, Pinto (BRA)

20 July 2018; 16:00	Mexico	46–23	Costa Rica	Coliseo Colegio Sagrado Corazón de Jesús Barranquilla; Referees: Reyes, Zuñiga (CUB)
20 July 2018; 16:00	Saaverda 9	(21–10)	Ramírez 6	Coliseo Colegio Sagrado Corazón de Jesús Barranquilla; Referees: Reyes, Zuñiga (CUB)
20 July 2018; 16:00	3× (yellow card) 3× (suspension)	Report	2× (yellow card) 2× (suspension)	Coliseo Colegio Sagrado Corazón de Jesús Barranquilla; Referees: Reyes, Zuñiga (CUB)

21 July 2018; 14:00	Mexico	46–26	Nicaragua	Coliseo Colegio Sagrado Corazón de Jesús Barranquilla; Referees: Gonzalez, Prieto (URU)
21 July 2018; 14:00	Sifuentes 7	(25–9)	Gutiérrez 6	Coliseo Colegio Sagrado Corazón de Jesús Barranquilla; Referees: Gonzalez, Prieto (URU)
21 July 2018; 14:00	2× (yellow card) 3× (suspension)	Report	1× (yellow card) 4× (suspension)	Coliseo Colegio Sagrado Corazón de Jesús Barranquilla; Referees: Gonzalez, Prieto (URU)

21 July 2018; 16:00	Puerto Rico	31–22	Costa Rica	Coliseo Colegio Sagrado Corazón de Jesús Barranquilla; Referees: Ojeda, Zapata (COL)
21 July 2018; 16:00	Pope 7	(17–8)	Taborda 5	Coliseo Colegio Sagrado Corazón de Jesús Barranquilla; Referees: Ojeda, Zapata (COL)
21 July 2018; 16:00	1× (yellow card) 3× (suspension)	Report	3× (yellow card) 2× (suspension)	Coliseo Colegio Sagrado Corazón de Jesús Barranquilla; Referees: Ojeda, Zapata (COL)

22 July 2018; 14:00	Nicaragua	20–16	Costa Rica	Coliseo Colegio Sagrado Corazón de Jesús Barranquilla; Referees: Coba, Osalde (MEX)
22 July 2018; 14:00	Rivera, Tercero 4	(9–7)	Taborda 5	Coliseo Colegio Sagrado Corazón de Jesús Barranquilla; Referees: Coba, Osalde (MEX)
22 July 2018; 14:00	5× (suspension)	Report	1× (yellow card) 6× (suspension)	Coliseo Colegio Sagrado Corazón de Jesús Barranquilla; Referees: Coba, Osalde (MEX)

22 July 2018; 16:00	Puerto Rico	29–26	Mexico	Coliseo Colegio Sagrado Corazón de Jesús Barranquilla; Referees: Estrada, Pineda (COL)
22 July 2018; 16:00	Fuentes 7	(15–11)	Rivera 8	Coliseo Colegio Sagrado Corazón de Jesús Barranquilla; Referees: Estrada, Pineda (COL)
22 July 2018; 16:00	3× (yellow card) 5× (suspension)	Report	1× (yellow card) 5× (suspension) 1×	Coliseo Colegio Sagrado Corazón de Jesús Barranquilla; Referees: Estrada, Pineda (COL)

==== Group B ====
Pos	Team	Pld	W	D	L	GF	GA	GD	Pts	Qualification
1	Dominican Republic	3	3	0	0	96	57	+39	6	Semifinals
2	Cuba	3	2	0	1	94	50	+44	4	Semifinals
3	Colombia (H)	3	1	0	2	49	78	−29	2	5–8th place semifinals
4	Guatemala	3	0	0	3	42	96	−54	0	5–8th place semifinals

Source: Barranquilla 2018
Rules for classification: 1) points; 2) head-to-head points; 3) head-to-head goal difference; 4) head-to-head number of goals scored; 5) goal difference.
(H) Hosts

20 July 2018; 18:00	Dominican Republic	42–13	Guatemala	Coliseo Colegio Sagrado Corazón de Jesús Barranquilla; Referees: Coba, Osalde (MEX)
20 July 2018; 18:00	Peña 10	(19–3)	Lavarreda 4	Coliseo Colegio Sagrado Corazón de Jesús Barranquilla; Referees: Coba, Osalde (MEX)
20 July 2018; 18:00	4× (yellow card) 5× (suspension)	Report	1× (yellow card) 3× (suspension)	Coliseo Colegio Sagrado Corazón de Jesús Barranquilla; Referees: Coba, Osalde (MEX)

20 July 2018; 20:00	Cuba	34–11	Colombia	Coliseo Colegio Sagrado Corazón de Jesús Barranquilla; Referees: González, Prieto (URU)
20 July 2018; 20:00	Amoros 10	(14–6)	Mazo 6	Coliseo Colegio Sagrado Corazón de Jesús Barranquilla; Referees: González, Prieto (URU)
20 July 2018; 20:00	1× (yellow card) 3× (suspension) 1× (red card)	Report	3× (yellow card) 4× (suspension)	Coliseo Colegio Sagrado Corazón de Jesús Barranquilla; Referees: González, Prieto (URU)

21 July 2018; 18:00	Cuba	35–11	Guatemala	Coliseo Colegio Sagrado Corazón de Jesús Barranquilla; Referees: Estrada, Pineda (COL)
21 July 2018; 18:00	Rodríguez 7	(16–6)	Herrera, Lavarreda 3	Coliseo Colegio Sagrado Corazón de Jesús Barranquilla; Referees: Estrada, Pineda (COL)
21 July 2018; 18:00	2× (yellow card) 4× (suspension)	Report	2× (yellow card) 2× (suspension)	Coliseo Colegio Sagrado Corazón de Jesús Barranquilla; Referees: Estrada, Pineda (COL)

21 July 2018; 20:00	Dominican Republic	26–19	Colombia	Coliseo Colegio Sagrado Corazón de Jesús Barranquilla; Referees: Aires, Pinto (BRA)
21 July 2018; 20:00	López 4	(11–10)	Mazo 8	Coliseo Colegio Sagrado Corazón de Jesús Barranquilla; Referees: Aires, Pinto (BRA)
21 July 2018; 20:00	2× (yellow card) 6× (suspension)	Report	3× (yellow card) 6× (suspension)	Coliseo Colegio Sagrado Corazón de Jesús Barranquilla; Referees: Aires, Pinto (BRA)

22 July 2018; 18:00	Cuba	25–28	Dominican Republic	Coliseo Colegio Sagrado Corazón de Jesús Barranquilla; Referees: Ojeda, Zapata (COL)
22 July 2018; 18:00	Rizo 10	(11–15)	Fernández, López 5	Coliseo Colegio Sagrado Corazón de Jesús Barranquilla; Referees: Ojeda, Zapata (COL)
22 July 2018; 18:00	4× (yellow card) 3× (suspension)	Report	3× (yellow card) 7× (suspension)	Coliseo Colegio Sagrado Corazón de Jesús Barranquilla; Referees: Ojeda, Zapata (COL)

22 July 2018; 20:00	Colombia	19–18	Guatemala	Coliseo Colegio Sagrado Corazón de Jesús Barranquilla; Referees: Reyes, Zuñiga (CUB)
22 July 2018; 20:00	Mazo 9	(8–8)	Herrera, McGauran 3	Coliseo Colegio Sagrado Corazón de Jesús Barranquilla; Referees: Reyes, Zuñiga (CUB)
22 July 2018; 20:00	1× (yellow card) 3× (suspension)	Report	2× (yellow card) 2× (suspension)	Coliseo Colegio Sagrado Corazón de Jesús Barranquilla; Referees: Reyes, Zuñiga (CUB)

=== Fifth to eighth place classification ===
5–8th place semifinals
24 July
Costa Rica	21
Colombia	27
24 July
Nicaragua	27
Guatemala	34

5th place
25 July
Colombia	17
Guatemala	18
7th place
25 July
Costa Rica	26
Nicaragua	22

==== 5–8th place semifinals ====
24 July 2018; 14:00	Costa Rica	21–27	Colombia	Coliseo Colegio Sagrado Corazón de Jesús Barranquilla; Referees: González, Prieto (URU)
24 July 2018; 14:00	Arce 6	(12–8)	three players 6	Coliseo Colegio Sagrado Corazón de Jesús Barranquilla; Referees: González, Prieto (URU)
24 July 2018; 14:00	6× (suspension)	Report	2× (yellow card) 5× (suspension)	Coliseo Colegio Sagrado Corazón de Jesús Barranquilla; Referees: González, Prieto (URU)

24 July 2018; 16:00	Nicaragua	27–34	Guatemala	Coliseo Colegio Sagrado Corazón de Jesús Barranquilla; Referees: Ojeda, Zapata (COL)
24 July 2018; 16:00	Tercero 8	(9–17)	Herrera 11	Coliseo Colegio Sagrado Corazón de Jesús Barranquilla; Referees: Ojeda, Zapata (COL)
24 July 2018; 16:00	1× (yellow card) 2× (suspension)	Report	3× (yellow card) 4× (suspension)	Coliseo Colegio Sagrado Corazón de Jesús Barranquilla; Referees: Ojeda, Zapata (COL)

==== Seventh place game ====
25 July 2018; 14:00	Costa Rica	26–22	Nicaragua	Coliseo Colegio Sagrado Corazón de Jesús Barranquilla; Referees: Coba, Osalde (MEX)
25 July 2018; 14:00	Ramirez 5	(10–10)	Lainez 5	Coliseo Colegio Sagrado Corazón de Jesús Barranquilla; Referees: Coba, Osalde (MEX)
25 July 2018; 14:00	2× (yellow card) 1× (suspension)	Report	2× (yellow card) 2× (suspension)	Coliseo Colegio Sagrado Corazón de Jesús Barranquilla; Referees: Coba, Osalde (MEX)

==== Fifth place game ====
25 July 2018; 16:00	Colombia	17–18	Guatemala	Coliseo Colegio Sagrado Corazón de Jesús Barranquilla; Referees: Aires, Pinto (BRA)
25 July 2018; 16:00	Mazo 6	(8–10)	Herrera 6	Coliseo Colegio Sagrado Corazón de Jesús Barranquilla; Referees: Aires, Pinto (BRA)
25 July 2018; 16:00	2× (yellow card) 5× (suspension) 1× (red card)	Report	3× (yellow card) 4× (suspension)	Coliseo Colegio Sagrado Corazón de Jesús Barranquilla; Referees: Aires, Pinto (BRA)

=== First to fourth place classification ===
Semifinals
24 July
Puerto Rico	28
Cuba	25
24 July
Mexico	29
Dominican Republic (OT)	33

Final
25 July
Puerto Rico	25
Dominican Republic	29
Third place
25 July
Cuba	29
Mexico	21

==== Semifinals ====
24 July 2018; 18:00	Puerto Rico	28–25	Cuba	Coliseo Colegio Sagrado Corazón de Jesús Barranquilla; Referees: Aires, Pinto (BRA)
24 July 2018; 18:00	Fuentes 10	(15–14)	Rizo 6	Coliseo Colegio Sagrado Corazón de Jesús Barranquilla; Referees: Aires, Pinto (BRA)
24 July 2018; 18:00	4× (yellow card) 4× (suspension)	Report	2× (yellow card) 5× (suspension)	Coliseo Colegio Sagrado Corazón de Jesús Barranquilla; Referees: Aires, Pinto (BRA)

24 July 2018
20:00
Mexico
29–33 (ET)
Dominican Republic
Coliseo Colegio Sagrado Corazón de Jesús Barranquilla
Referees: Reyes, Zuñiga (CUB)
Rivera 5
(10–10)
Brito 7
2× (yellow card) 5× (suspension) 2× (red card)
Report
3× (yellow card) 1× (suspension) 2× (red card)

FT: 24–24 ET: 5–9

==== Third place game ====
25 July 2018; 18:00	Cuba	29–21	Mexico	Coliseo Colegio Sagrado Corazón de Jesús Barranquilla; Referees: Estrada, Pineda (COL)
25 July 2018; 18:00	Camejo 7	(13–10)	Leal 7	Coliseo Colegio Sagrado Corazón de Jesús Barranquilla; Referees: Estrada, Pineda (COL)
25 July 2018; 18:00	3× (yellow card) 3× (suspension)	Report	2× (yellow card) 2× (suspension)	Coliseo Colegio Sagrado Corazón de Jesús Barranquilla; Referees: Estrada, Pineda (COL)

==== Final ====
25 July 2018; 20:00	Puerto Rico	25–29	Dominican Republic	Coliseo Colegio Sagrado Corazón de Jesús Barranquilla; Referees: González, Prieto (URU)
25 July 2018; 20:00	Fuentes 10	(12–12)	Peña 9	Coliseo Colegio Sagrado Corazón de Jesús Barranquilla; Referees: González, Prieto (URU)
25 July 2018; 20:00	2× (yellow card) 2× (suspension)	Report	1× (yellow card) 6× (suspension) 1× (red card)	Coliseo Colegio Sagrado Corazón de Jesús Barranquilla; Referees: González, Prieto (URU)

=== Final standing ===
Rank	Team
1st place, gold medalist(s)	Dominican Republic
2nd place, silver medalist(s)	Puerto Rico
3rd place, bronze medalist(s)	Cuba
4	Mexico
5	Guatemala
6	Colombia
7	Costa Rica
8	Nicaragua

Team qualified to the 2019 Pan American Games

=== Top scorers ===
Rank	Player	Goals
1	(Puerto Rico) Zuleika Fuentes	35
1	(Colombia) Verónica Mazo	35
3	(Puerto Rico) Nathalys Ceballos	26
3	(Guatemala) Luisa Herrera	26
3	(Mexico) Gemma Leal	26
