= 2004 Pan American Women's Youth Handball Championship =

2004 Pan American Handball Women's Youth Championship
Tournament details
- Host country: Brazil
- Venue: 1 (in 1 host city)
- Dates: September 21–25
- Teams: 8

Final positions
- Champions: Brazil
- Runners-up: Argentina
- Third place: Uruguay
- Fourth place: Mexico

Tournament statistics
- Matches played: 20
- Goals scored: 951 (47.55 per match)
- Top scorers: Alejandra Garcia (MEX) (49 goals)

The 2004 American Handball Women's Youth Championships took place in São José dos Pinhais from September 21 – 25.

== Teams ==
Group A	Group B
Brazil; Canada; Puerto Rico; Uruguay	Argentina; Chile; Mexico; Paraguay

== Preliminary round ==
=== Group A ===
Team	Pld	W	D	L	GF	GA	GD	Pts
Brazil	3	3	0	0	113	46	+67	6
Uruguay	3	2	0	1	65	69	–4	4
Puerto Rico	3	1	0	2	46	67	–21	2
Canada	3	0	0	3	37	89	–52	0

September 21; 12:30	Uruguay	26 – 13	Canada	Ginásio Ney Braga, São José dos Pinhais
September 21; 12:30		(13–8)		Ginásio Ney Braga, São José dos Pinhais

September 21; 18:30	Brazil	31 – 9	Puerto Rico	Ginásio Ney Braga, São José dos Pinhais
September 21; 18:30		(12–6)		Ginásio Ney Braga, São José dos Pinhais

September 22; 14:00	Puerto Rico	20 – 24	Uruguay	Ginásio Ney Braga, São José dos Pinhais
September 22; 14:00		(10–10)		Ginásio Ney Braga, São José dos Pinhais

September 22; 22:00	Brazil	46 – 12	Canada	Ginásio Ney Braga, São José dos Pinhais
September 22; 22:00		(17–2)		Ginásio Ney Braga, São José dos Pinhais

September 23; 15:30	Canada	12 – 17	Puerto Rico	Ginásio Ney Braga, São José dos Pinhais
September 23; 15:30		(6–10)		Ginásio Ney Braga, São José dos Pinhais

September 23; 18:30	Brazil	36 – 15	Uruguay	Ginásio Ney Braga, São José dos Pinhais
September 23; 18:30		(15–6)		Ginásio Ney Braga, São José dos Pinhais

=== Group B ===
Team	Pld	W	D	L	GF	GA	GD	Pts
Argentina	3	3	0	0	106	49	+57	6
Mexico	3	2	0	1	76	88	–12	4
Chile	3	1	0	2	65	82	–17	2
Paraguay	3	0	0	3	72	100	–28	0

September 21; 18:30	Argentina	39 – 19	Mexico	Ginásio Ney Braga, São José dos Pinhais
September 21; 18:30		(16–8)		Ginásio Ney Braga, São José dos Pinhais

September 21; 20:00	Chile	31 – 27	Paraguay	Ginásio Ney Braga, São José dos Pinhais
September 21; 20:00		(20–12)		Ginásio Ney Braga, São José dos Pinhais

September 22; 12:30	Chile	23 – 26	Mexico	Ginásio Ney Braga, São José dos Pinhais
September 22; 12:30		(14–13)		Ginásio Ney Braga, São José dos Pinhais

September 22; 15:30	Argentina	38 – 19	Paraguay	Ginásio Ney Braga, São José dos Pinhais
September 22; 15:30		(21–9)		Ginásio Ney Braga, São José dos Pinhais

September 23; 17:00	Argentina	29 – 11	Chile	Ginásio Ney Braga, São José dos Pinhais
September 23; 17:00		(17–4)		Ginásio Ney Braga, São José dos Pinhais

September 23; 20:00	Paraguay	26 – 31	Mexico	Ginásio Ney Braga, São José dos Pinhais
September 23; 20:00		(8–19)		Ginásio Ney Braga, São José dos Pinhais

== Placement 5th–8th ==
September 24; 14:00	Chile	24 – 14	Canada	Ginásio Ney Braga, São José dos Pinhais
September 24; 14:00		(8–7)		Ginásio Ney Braga, São José dos Pinhais

September 24; 15:00	Puerto Rico	24 – 16	Paraguay	Ginásio Ney Braga, São José dos Pinhais
September 24; 15:00		(12–8)		Ginásio Ney Braga, São José dos Pinhais

=== 7th/8th ===
September 25; 9:00	Canada	19 – 17	Paraguay	Ginásio Ney Braga, São José dos Pinhais
September 25; 9:00		(12–7)		Ginásio Ney Braga, São José dos Pinhais

=== 5th/6th ===
September 25; 9:00	Chile	28 – 23	Puerto Rico	Ginásio Ney Braga, São José dos Pinhais
September 25; 9:00		(11–12)		Ginásio Ney Braga, São José dos Pinhais

== Final round ==
Semifinal
September 24 – São José dos Pinhais
Brazil	45
Mexico	13
September 24 – São José dos Pinhais
Uruguay	18
Argentina	28

Final
September 25 – São José dos Pinhais
Brazil	33
Argentina	21
Third place
September 25 – São José dos Pinhais
Mexico	23
Uruguay	25

=== Semifinals ===
September 24; 17:00	Argentina	28 – 18	Uruguay	Ginásio Ney Braga, São José dos Pinhais
September 24; 17:00		(12–7)		Ginásio Ney Braga, São José dos Pinhais

September 24; 18:30	Brazil	45 – 13	Mexico	Ginásio Ney Braga, São José dos Pinhais
September 24; 18:30		(23–6)		Ginásio Ney Braga, São José dos Pinhais

=== Bronze medal match ===
September 25; 13:30	Uruguay	25 – 23	Mexico	Ginásio Ney Braga, São José dos Pinhais
September 25; 13:30		(15–11)		Ginásio Ney Braga, São José dos Pinhais

=== Gold medal match ===
September 25; 15:30	Brazil	33 – 21	Argentina	Ginásio Ney Braga, São José dos Pinhais
September 25; 15:30		(14–10)		Ginásio Ney Braga, São José dos Pinhais

== Final standing ==
Rank	Team
Gold medal	Brazil
Silver medal	Argentina
Bronze medal	Uruguay
4	Mexico
5	Chile
6	Puerto Rico
7	Canada
8	Paraguay
