= 2001 Pan American Women's Youth Handball Championship =

2001 Pan American Handball Women's Youth Championship
Tournament details
- Host country: Brazil
- Venue(s): 1 (in 1 host city)
- Dates: September 26–30
- Teams: 6

Final positions
- Champions: Brazil
- Runners-up: Argentina
- Third place: Uruguay
- Fourth place: Chile

Tournament statistics
- Matches played: 15
- Goals scored: 699 (46.6 per match)

The 2001 American Handball Women's Youth Championships took place in São Bernardo do Campo from September 26 – 30.

== Results ==
Team	Pld	W	D	L	GF	GA	GD	Pts
Brazil	5	5	0	0	153	73	+80	10
Argentina	5	4	0	1	127	86	+41	8
Uruguay	5	3	0	2	120	98	+22	6
Chile	5	2	0	3	108	110	–2	4
Paraguay	5	1	0	4	118	129	–11	2
Mexico	5	0	0	5	73	203	–130	0

September 26; 12:00	Uruguay	22 – 18	Chile	Ginásio do MESC, São Bernardo do Campo
September 26; 12:00		(10–9)		Ginásio do MESC, São Bernardo do Campo

September 26; 14:00	Argentina	46 – 16	Mexico	Ginásio do MESC, São Bernardo do Campo
September 26; 14:00		(26–7)		Ginásio do MESC, São Bernardo do Campo

September 26; 16:00	Brazil	32 – 19	Paraguay	Ginásio do MESC, São Bernardo do Campo
September 26; 16:00		(16–9)		Ginásio do MESC, São Bernardo do Campo

September 27; 12:00	Paraguay	20 – 29	Argentina	Ginásio do MESC, São Bernardo do Campo
September 27; 12:00		(7–14)		Ginásio do MESC, São Bernardo do Campo

September 27; 14:00	Mexico	15 – 43	Uruguay	Ginásio do MESC, São Bernardo do Campo
September 27; 14:00		(9–19)		Ginásio do MESC, São Bernardo do Campo

September 27; 16:00	Brazil	26 – 16	Chile	Ginásio do MESC, São Bernardo do Campo
September 27; 16:00		(16–9)		Ginásio do MESC, São Bernardo do Campo

September 28; 12:00	Paraguay	23 – 26	Chile	Ginásio do MESC, São Bernardo do Campo
September 28; 12:00		(7–10)		Ginásio do MESC, São Bernardo do Campo

September 28; 14:00	Argentina	17 – 13	Uruguay	Ginásio do MESC, São Bernardo do Campo
September 28; 14:00		(7–3)		Ginásio do MESC, São Bernardo do Campo

September 28; 16:00	Brazil	47 – 7	Mexico	Ginásio do MESC, São Bernardo do Campo
September 28; 16:00		(23–4)		Ginásio do MESC, São Bernardo do Campo

September 29; 12:00	Argentina	22 – 17	Chile	Ginásio do MESC, São Bernardo do Campo
September 29; 12:00		(10–7)		Ginásio do MESC, São Bernardo do Campo

September 29; 14:00	Mexico	18 – 36	Paraguay	Ginásio do MESC, São Bernardo do Campo
September 29; 14:00		(11–18)		Ginásio do MESC, São Bernardo do Campo

September 29; 16:00	Brazil	28 – 18	Uruguay	Ginásio do MESC, São Bernardo do Campo
September 29; 16:00		(12–6)		Ginásio do MESC, São Bernardo do Campo

September 30; 10:00	Chile	31 – 17	Mexico	Ginásio do MESC, São Bernardo do Campo
September 30; 10:00		(15–4)		Ginásio do MESC, São Bernardo do Campo

September 30; 12:00	Uruguay	24 – 20	Paraguay	Ginásio do MESC, São Bernardo do Campo
September 30; 12:00		(14–9)		Ginásio do MESC, São Bernardo do Campo

September 30; 14:00	Brazil	20 – 13	Argentina	Ginásio do MESC, São Bernardo do Campo
September 30; 14:00		(8–6)		Ginásio do MESC, São Bernardo do Campo

== Final standing ==
Rank	Team
Gold medal	Brazil
Silver medal	Argentina
Bronze medal	Uruguay
4	Chile
5	Paraguay
6	Mexico
