= 2008 Pan American Women's Junior Handball Championship =

International handball competition

The 2008 Pan American Women's Junior Handball Championship took place in the sports complex CeNARD, in Buenos Aires from March 11 – March 15.

== Teams ==
Group A	Group B
Brazil; Chile; Greenland; Dominican Republic	Argentina; Uruguay; Puerto Rico; Mexico

=== Bronze medal match ===
March 14	Uruguay	30 – 22	Chile	Buenos Aires

=== Gold medal match ===
March 15	Argentina	24 – 17	Brazil	Buenos Aires

== Final standing ==
Rank	Team
Gold medal	Argentina
Silver medal	Brazil
Bronze medal	Uruguay
4	Chile
5	Puerto Rico
6	Greenland
7	Mexico
8	Canada
