= Francielle da Rocha =

Brazilian handball player (born 1992)

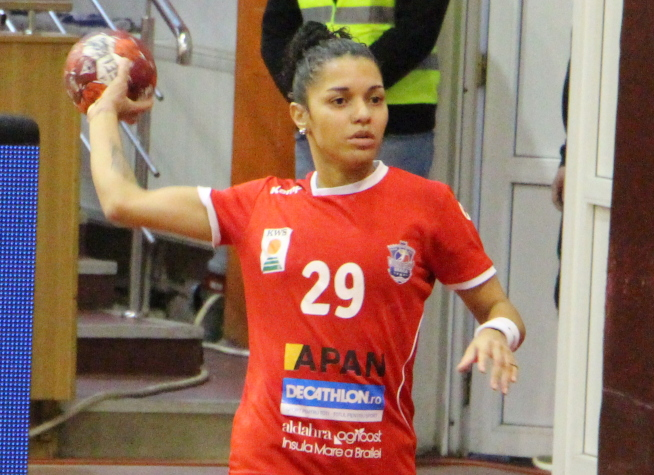

Personal information
- Full name: Francielle Gomes da Rocha
- Born: 10 June 1992 (age 34) Campo Belo, Brazil
- Height: 1.66 m (5 ft 5 in)

Sport
- Sport: Handball
- Position: Centre Back

Youth career
- Years: Team
- –2013: Vegus/Guarulhos

Senior clubs
- Years: Team
- 2013–2015: Hypo Niederösterreich
- 2015–2018: Vegus/Guarulhos
- 2018–2021: Esporte Clube Pinheiros
- 2021–2024: HC Dunărea Brăila
- 2024–: SCM Craiova
National team
Years	Team	Apps	(Gls)
–	Brazil	98	(122)
Medal record
Pan American Games
Gold medal – first place	2015 Toronto	Team
Gold medal – first place	2023 Santiago	Team
Pan American Championship
Gold medal – first place	2013 Dominican Republic
Gold medal – first place	2015 Cuba
South and Central American Championship
Gold medal – first place	2021 Paraguay
Gold medal – first place	2022 Argentina
South American Games
Gold medal – first place	2018 Cochabamba	Team
Panamerican Youth Championship
Gold medal – first place	2010 Brazil
Youth Olympic Games
Bronze medal – third place	2010 Singapore	Team
Panamerican Junior Championship
Gold medal – first place	2012 Dominican Republic
- Updated on 13 November 2023

Francielle Gomes da Rocha (born 10 June 1992) is a Brazilian handball player. She plays for the Romanian club SCM Craiova and is also a member of the Brazil women's national handball team.

She has played in the 2012 Women's Junior World Handball Championship.
