= 2010 Pan American Women's Junior Handball Championship =

Tournament details
- Host country: Argentina
- Venue(s): 1 (in 1 host city)
- Dates: April 6–10
- Teams: 8

Final positions
- Champions: Argentina
- Runners-up: Brazil
- Third place: Dominican Republic
- Fourth place: Puerto Rico

Tournament statistics
- Matches played: 20
- Goals scored: 1,060 (53 per match)
- Top scorer(s): Carolina Lopez (DOM) (42 goals)

Awards
- Best player: Victoria Crivelli (ARG)

The 2010 Pan American Women's Junior Handball Championship took place in the sports complex CeNARD, in Buenos Aires from April 6 – April 10. It acts as the American qualifying tournament for the 2010 Women's Junior World Handball Championship.

== Teams ==
Group A	Group B
Brazil; Chile; Greenland; Dominican Republic	Argentina; Uruguay; Puerto Rico; Mexico

== Preliminary round ==
=== Group A ===
Team	Pld	W	D	L	GF	GA	GD	Pts
Brazil	3	3	0	0	101	67	+34	6
Dominican Republic	3	2	0	1	71	70	+1	4
Chile	3	1	0	2	69	82	-13	2
Greenland	3	0	0	3	61	83	–22	0

April 06; 13:30	Brazil	33 – 20	Dominican Republic	Buenos Aires
April 06; 13:30		(17–7)		Buenos Aires

April 06; 15:30	Chile	24 – 22	Greenland	Buenos Aires
April 06; 15:30		(11–13)		Buenos Aires

April 07; 13:30	Greenland	25 – 32	Brazil	Buenos Aires
April 07; 13:30		(11–15)		Buenos Aires

April 07; 15:30	Dominican Republic	24 – 23	Chile	Buenos Aires
April 07; 15:30		(10–9)		Buenos Aires

April 08; 13:30	Greenland	14 – 27	Dominican Republic	Buenos Aires
April 08; 13:30		(6–13)		Buenos Aires

April 08; 15:30	Brazil	36 – 22	Chile	Buenos Aires
April 08; 15:30		(13–13)		Buenos Aires

=== Group B ===
Team	Pld	W	D	L	GF	GA	GD	Pts
Argentina	3	3	0	0	122	63	+59	6
Puerto Rico	3	2	0	1	78	88	-10	4
Uruguay	3	1	0	2	67	81	-14	2
Mexico	3	0	0	3	57	92	–35	0

April 06; 17:30	Uruguay	23 – 25	Puerto Rico	Buenos Aires
April 06; 17:30		(12–12)		Buenos Aires

April 06; 20:00	Argentina	41 – 17	Mexico	Buenos Aires
April 06; 20:00		(20–5)		Buenos Aires

April 07; 17:30	Mexico	16 – 26	Uruguay	Buenos Aires
April 07; 17:30		(7–11)		Buenos Aires

April 07; 19:30	Puerto Rico	28 – 41	Argentina	Buenos Aires
April 07; 19:30		(16–26)		Buenos Aires

April 08; 17:30	Mexico	24 – 25	Puerto Rico	Buenos Aires
April 08; 17:30		(8–10)		Buenos Aires

April 08; 19:30	Argentina	40 – 18	Uruguay	Buenos Aires
April 08; 19:30		(23–10)		Buenos Aires

== Placement 5th–8th ==
April 09; 13:30	Chile	18 – 23	Mexico	Buenos Aires
April 09; 13:30		(8–13)		Buenos Aires

April 09; 15:30	Greenland	27 – 30	Uruguay	Buenos Aires
April 09; 15:30		(14–18)		Buenos Aires

=== 7th/8th ===
April 10; 13:00	Chile	20 – 29	Greenland	Buenos Aires
April 10; 13:00		(8–18)		Buenos Aires

=== 5th/6th ===
April 10; 18:00	Mexico	29 – 31	Uruguay	Buenos Aires
April 10; 18:00		(12–18)		Buenos Aires

== Final round ==
Semifinal
April 09 – Buenos Aires
Brazil	33
Puerto Rico	20
April 09 – Buenos Aires
Dominican Republic	24
Argentina	32

Final
April 10 – Buenos Aires
Brazil	26
Argentina	30
Third place
April 10 – Buenos Aires
Puerto Rico	26
Dominican Republic	36

=== Semifinals ===
April 09; 17:30	Brazil	33 – 20	Puerto Rico	Buenos Aires
April 09; 17:30		(14–12)		Buenos Aires

April 09; 19:30	Dominican Republic	24 – 32	Argentina	Buenos Aires
April 09; 19:30		(12–16)		Buenos Aires

=== Bronze medal match ===
April 10; 17:00	Puerto Rico	26 – 36	Dominican Republic	Buenos Aires
April 10; 17:00		(8–20)		Buenos Aires

=== Gold medal match ===
April 10; 19:00	Brazil	26 – 30	Argentina	Buenos Aires
April 10; 19:00		(9–16)		Buenos Aires

== Final standing ==
Rank	Team
Gold medal	Argentina
Silver medal	Brazil
Bronze medal	Dominican Republic
4	Puerto Rico
5	Uruguay
6	Mexico
7	Greenland
8	Chile

Team advanced to the 2010 Women's Junior World Handball Championship
