= 2016 Pan American Women's Junior Handball Championship =

Tournament details
- Host country: Brazil
- Venue(s): 1 (in 1 host city)
- Dates: 15–19 March
- Teams: 6 (from 1 confederation)

Final positions
- Champions: Brazil (8th title)
- Runner-up: Argentina
- Third place: Chile
- Fourth place: Paraguay

Tournament statistics
- Matches played: 15
- Goals scored: 838 (55.87 per match)
- Top scorer(s): Fernanda Insfrán (PAR) (35 goals)

Awards
- Best player: Bruna de Paula (BRA)

The 2016 Pan American Women's Junior Handball Championship was held in the city of Foz do Iguaçu, Brazil from 15 to 19 March 2016. It acts as the American qualifying tournament for the 2016 Women's Junior World Handball Championship.

== Results ==
Team	Pld	W	D	L	GF	GA	GD	Pts
Brazil	5	5	0	0	180	99	81	10
Argentina	5	4	0	1	158	103	55	8
Chile	5	3	0	2	139	140	-1	6
Paraguay	5	2	0	3	137	154	-17	4
Uruguay	5	1	0	4	139	165	-26	2
Canada	5	0	0	5	85	177	-92	0

== Round robin ==
15 March 2016; 16:00	Uruguay	31–32	Chile	Ginásio Costa Cavalcanti, Foz do Iguaçu; Attendance: 150; Referees: Burgos, Delgado (ARG)
15 March 2016; 16:00	Didak 7	(14–17)	Zavala 9	Ginásio Costa Cavalcanti, Foz do Iguaçu; Attendance: 150; Referees: Burgos, Delgado (ARG)
15 March 2016; 16:00	3× (yellow card) 1× (suspension)	Report	3× (yellow card) 3× (suspension)	Ginásio Costa Cavalcanti, Foz do Iguaçu; Attendance: 150; Referees: Burgos, Delgado (ARG)

15 March 2016; 18:00	Argentina	40–13	Canada	Ginásio Costa Cavalcanti, Foz do Iguaçu; Attendance: 250; Referees: Quadros, Lima (BRA)
15 March 2016; 18:00	three players 6	(22–6)	Perry 5	Ginásio Costa Cavalcanti, Foz do Iguaçu; Attendance: 250; Referees: Quadros, Lima (BRA)
15 March 2016; 18:00	2× (yellow card) 3× (suspension)	Report	2× (yellow card) 7× (suspension)	Ginásio Costa Cavalcanti, Foz do Iguaçu; Attendance: 250; Referees: Quadros, Lima (BRA)

15 March 2016; 20:00	Brazil	38–18	Paraguay	Ginásio Costa Cavalcanti, Foz do Iguaçu; Referees: Sosa, Lemes (URU)
15 March 2016; 20:00	Lima 8	(19–10)	Insfrán 7	Ginásio Costa Cavalcanti, Foz do Iguaçu; Referees: Sosa, Lemes (URU)
15 March 2016; 20:00	3× (yellow card) 5× (suspension) 1× (red card)	Report	2× (yellow card) 6× (suspension)	Ginásio Costa Cavalcanti, Foz do Iguaçu; Referees: Sosa, Lemes (URU)

16 March 2016; 16:00	Chile	22–33	Argentina	Ginásio Costa Cavalcanti, Foz do Iguaçu; Referees: Sosa, Lemes (URU)
16 March 2016; 16:00	Zavala, Alvarez 5	(10–15)	Casasola 6	Ginásio Costa Cavalcanti, Foz do Iguaçu; Referees: Sosa, Lemes (URU)
16 March 2016; 16:00	2× (yellow card) 2× (suspension)	Report	3× (yellow card) 2× (suspension)	Ginásio Costa Cavalcanti, Foz do Iguaçu; Referees: Sosa, Lemes (URU)

16 March 2016; 18:00	Paraguay	39–32	Uruguay	Ginásio Costa Cavalcanti, Foz do Iguaçu; Attendance: 250; Referees: Quadros, Lima (BRA)
16 March 2016; 18:00	Fernández 13	(21–16)	Charlo 9	Ginásio Costa Cavalcanti, Foz do Iguaçu; Attendance: 250; Referees: Quadros, Lima (BRA)
16 March 2016; 18:00	3× (yellow card) 9× (suspension)	Report	1× (yellow card) 2× (suspension)	Ginásio Costa Cavalcanti, Foz do Iguaçu; Attendance: 250; Referees: Quadros, Lima (BRA)

16 March 2016; 20:00	Canada	8–43	Brazil	Ginásio Costa Cavalcanti, Foz do Iguaçu; Attendance: 300; Referees: Ojeda, Zapata (COL)
16 March 2016; 20:00	Robillard 4	(6–18)	Fernandes 10	Ginásio Costa Cavalcanti, Foz do Iguaçu; Attendance: 300; Referees: Ojeda, Zapata (COL)
16 March 2016; 20:00	3× (yellow card) 2× (suspension)	Report	2× (suspension)	Ginásio Costa Cavalcanti, Foz do Iguaçu; Attendance: 300; Referees: Ojeda, Zapata (COL)

17 March 2016; 16:00	Uruguay	23–31	Argentina	Ginásio Costa Cavalcanti, Foz do Iguaçu; Attendance: 120; Referees: Ojeda, Zapata (COL)
17 March 2016; 16:00	Charlo 7	(14–17)	Mazza 7	Ginásio Costa Cavalcanti, Foz do Iguaçu; Attendance: 120; Referees: Ojeda, Zapata (COL)
17 March 2016; 16:00	3× (yellow card) 4× (suspension)	Report	3× (yellow card) 5× (suspension)	Ginásio Costa Cavalcanti, Foz do Iguaçu; Attendance: 120; Referees: Ojeda, Zapata (COL)

17 March 2016; 18:00	Paraguay	36–23	Canada	Ginásio Costa Cavalcanti, Foz do Iguaçu; Attendance: 100; Referees: Quadros, Lima (BRA)
17 March 2016; 18:00	Insfrán 9	(16–13)	three players 5	Ginásio Costa Cavalcanti, Foz do Iguaçu; Attendance: 100; Referees: Quadros, Lima (BRA)
17 March 2016; 18:00	1× (yellow card) 4× (suspension)	Report	3× (yellow card) 2× (suspension)	Ginásio Costa Cavalcanti, Foz do Iguaçu; Attendance: 100; Referees: Quadros, Lima (BRA)

17 March 2016; 20:00	Brazil	33–21	Chile	Ginásio Costa Cavalcanti, Foz do Iguaçu; Attendance: 400; Referees: Burgos, Delgado (ARG)
17 March 2016; 20:00	Paula, Souza 5	(17–7)	Lovera 6	Ginásio Costa Cavalcanti, Foz do Iguaçu; Attendance: 400; Referees: Burgos, Delgado (ARG)
17 March 2016; 20:00	3× (yellow card) 2× (suspension)	Report	3× (yellow card) 1× (suspension)	Ginásio Costa Cavalcanti, Foz do Iguaçu; Attendance: 400; Referees: Burgos, Delgado (ARG)

18 March 2016; 16:00	Uruguay	26–24	Canada	Ginásio Costa Cavalcanti, Foz do Iguaçu; Attendance: 100; Referees: Ojeda, Zapata (COL)
18 March 2016; 16:00	Didak 7	(12–11)	Wong 6	Ginásio Costa Cavalcanti, Foz do Iguaçu; Attendance: 100; Referees: Ojeda, Zapata (COL)
18 March 2016; 16:00	3× (yellow card) 1× (suspension)	Report	0× (yellow card) 5× (suspension)	Ginásio Costa Cavalcanti, Foz do Iguaçu; Attendance: 100; Referees: Ojeda, Zapata (COL)

18 March 2016; 18:00	Chile	32–26	Paraguay	Ginásio Costa Cavalcanti, Foz do Iguaçu; Attendance: 300; Referees: Burgos, Delgado (ARG)
18 March 2016; 18:00	Miño 8	(17–15)	Insfrán 9	Ginásio Costa Cavalcanti, Foz do Iguaçu; Attendance: 300; Referees: Burgos, Delgado (ARG)
18 March 2016; 18:00	3× (yellow card) 4× (suspension)	Report	3× (yellow card) 4× (suspension)	Ginásio Costa Cavalcanti, Foz do Iguaçu; Attendance: 300; Referees: Burgos, Delgado (ARG)

18 March 2016; 20:00	Argentina	25–27	Brazil	Ginásio Costa Cavalcanti, Foz do Iguaçu; Referees: Sosa, Lemes (URU)
18 March 2016; 20:00	Sans, Carletti 6	(10–12)	Fernandes 9	Ginásio Costa Cavalcanti, Foz do Iguaçu; Referees: Sosa, Lemes (URU)
18 March 2016; 20:00	3× (yellow card)	Report	3× (yellow card) 4× (suspension) 1× (red card)	Ginásio Costa Cavalcanti, Foz do Iguaçu; Referees: Sosa, Lemes (URU)

19 March 2016; 14:00	Canada	17–32	Chile	Ginásio Costa Cavalcanti, Foz do Iguaçu; Attendance: 100; Referees: Quadros, Lima (BRA)
19 March 2016; 14:00	Abbey 5	(9–18)	Lovera 7	Ginásio Costa Cavalcanti, Foz do Iguaçu; Attendance: 100; Referees: Quadros, Lima (BRA)
19 March 2016; 14:00	2× (yellow card)	Report	2× (suspension)	Ginásio Costa Cavalcanti, Foz do Iguaçu; Attendance: 100; Referees: Quadros, Lima (BRA)

19 March 2016; 16:00	Argentina	29–18	Paraguay	Ginásio Costa Cavalcanti, Foz do Iguaçu; Referees: Sosa, Lemes (URU)
19 March 2016; 16:00	Casasola 7	(13–11)	Ferschenko 5	Ginásio Costa Cavalcanti, Foz do Iguaçu; Referees: Sosa, Lemes (URU)
19 March 2016; 16:00	3× (yellow card) 4× (suspension)	Report	3× (yellow card) 6× (suspension)	Ginásio Costa Cavalcanti, Foz do Iguaçu; Referees: Sosa, Lemes (URU)

19 March 2016; 18:00	Brazil	39–27	Uruguay	Ginásio Costa Cavalcanti, Foz do Iguaçu; Attendance: 600; Referees: Burgos, Delgado (ARG)
19 March 2016; 18:00	Bitolo 6	(23–10)	Dondan 8	Ginásio Costa Cavalcanti, Foz do Iguaçu; Attendance: 600; Referees: Burgos, Delgado (ARG)
19 March 2016; 18:00	3× (yellow card) 3× (suspension)	Report	2× (yellow card) 1× (suspension)	Ginásio Costa Cavalcanti, Foz do Iguaçu; Attendance: 600; Referees: Burgos, Delgado (ARG)

== Final standing ==
Rank	Team
Gold medal	Brazil
Silver medal	Argentina
Bronze medal	Chile
4	Paraguay
5	Uruguay
6	Canada

Team qualified to the 2016 Women's Junior World Handball Championship
