= Pan American Women's Junior Handball Championship =

The Pan American Women's Junior Handball Championship was the official competition for junior women's national handball teams of the Americas, and took place every two years. In addition to crowning the Pan American champions, the tournament also served as a qualifying tournament for the IHF Junior World Handball Championship. In 2018, the PATHF was deprived of recognition and the tournament was replaced with the North American & Caribbean and South and Central American Women's Junior Handball Championships.

== Summary ==
Year	Host	Final			Third place match		
Year	Host	Champion	Score	Runner-up	Third place	Score	Fourth place
1993; Details	(Brazil); Foz do Iguaçu	Brazil	No playoffs	Argentina	Uruguay	No playoffs	Paraguay
1997; Details	(Brazil); Pontal do Paraná	Brazil	No playoffs	Argentina	Uruguay		
1998; Details	(United States); Long Island	Brazil	32 – 14	Canada	United States	17 – 15	Puerto Rico
2001; Details	(Canada); Montreal	Brazil	No playoffs	Argentina	Canada	No playoffs	Mexico
2002; Details	(Brazil); São Bernardo do Campo	Brazil	No playoffs	Uruguay	Argentina	No playoffs	Canada
2004; Details	(Canada); Edmonton	Argentina	23 – 22	Brazil	Puerto Rico	36 – 32	Canada
2008; Details	(Argentina); Buenos Aires	Argentina	24 – 17	Brazil	Uruguay	30 – 22	Chile
2010; Details	(Argentina); Buenos Aires	Argentina	30 – 26	Brazil	Dominican Republic	36 – 26	Puerto Rico
2012; Details	(Dominican Republic); Santo Domingo	Brazil	37 – 33	Uruguay	Argentina	30 – 21	Canada
2014; Details	(Argentina); Buenos Aires	Brazil	No playoffs	Uruguay	Argentina	No playoffs	Paraguay
2016; Details	(Brazil); Foz do Iguaçu	Brazil	No playoffs	Argentina	Chile	No playoffs	Paraguay
2018; Details	(Brazil); Goiânia	Brazil	No playoffs	Chile	Paraguay	No playoffs	Argentina

== Medal table ==
Rank	Nation	Gold	Silver	Bronze	Total
1	Brazil	9	3	0	12
2	Argentina	3	4	3	10
3	Uruguay	0	3	3	6
4	Canada	0	1	1	2
4	Chile	0	1	1	2
6	Dominican Republic	0	0	1	1
6	Paraguay	0	0	1	1
6	Puerto Rico	0	0	1	1
6	United States	0	0	1	1
Totals (9 entries)		12	12	12	36

== Participating nations ==
Nation	(Brazil) 1993	(Brazil) 1997	(United States) 1998	(Canada) 2001	(Brazil) 2002	(Canada) 2004	(Argentina) 2008	(Argentina) 2010	(Dominican Republic) 2012	(Argentina) 2014	(Brazil) 2016	(Brazil) 2018	Years
Argentina	2nd	2nd	-	2nd	3rd	1st	1st	1st	3rd	3rd	2nd	4th	11
Brazil	1st	1st	1st	1st	1st	2nd	2nd	2nd	1st	1st	1st	1st	12
Canada	-	-	2nd	3rd	4th	4th	8th	-	4th	5th	6th	-	8
Chile	-	-	-	-	-	-	4th	8th	6th	6th	3rd	2nd	6
Dominican Republic	-	-	-	-	-	-	-	3rd	5th	-	-	6th	3
Greenland	-	-	-	-	-	5th	6th	7th	-	-	-	-	3
Mexico	-	-	-	4th	-	6th	7th	6th	-	-	-	-	4
Paraguay	4th	-	-	-	-	-	-	-	-	4th	4th	3rd	4
Puerto Rico	-	-	4th	5th	-	3rd	5th	4th	7th	-	-	-	6
United States	-	-	3rd	6th	5th	7th	-	-	8th	-	-	-	5
Uruguay	3rd	3rd	-	-	2nd	-	3rd	5th	2nd	2nd	5th	5th	9
Total	4	3	4	6	5	7	8	8	8	6	6	6	
