= 2014 Pan American Women's Youth Handball Championship =

Tournament details
- Host country: Brazil
- Venue(s): 1 (in 1 host city)
- Dates: April 22–26
- Teams: 6

Final positions
- Champions: Brazil
- Runners-up: Paraguay
- Third place: Argentina
- Fourth place: Uruguay

Tournament statistics
- Top scorer(s): Martina Barreiro (URU) (48 goals)

The 2014 Pan American Women's Youth Handball Championship took place in Fortaleza from April 22 – 26. It acts as the Pan American qualifying tournament for the 2014 Women's Youth World Handball Championship and 2014 Youth Olympic Games.

== Results ==
Team	Pld	W	D	L	GF	GA	GD	Pts
Brazil	5	5	0	0	156	104	+52	10
Uruguay	5	2	0	3	131	125	+6	4
Paraguay	5	4	0	1	139	105	+34	8
Argentina	5	3	0	2	146	111	+35	6
Canada	5	0	0	5	75	175	-100	0
Chile	5	1	0	4	101	138	-37	2

April 22; 14:30	Uruguay	32 – 19	Chile	Unifor, Fortaleza
April 22; 14:30		(14-9)		Unifor, Fortaleza

April 22; 16:00	Paraguay	34 – 11	Canada	Unifor, Fortaleza
April 22; 16:00		(13-4)		Unifor, Fortaleza

April 22; 18:00	Brazil	32 – 31	Argentina	Unifor, Fortaleza
April 22; 18:00		(17-13)		Unifor, Fortaleza

April 23; 14:30	Uruguay	18 – 26	Argentina	Unifor, Fortaleza
April 23; 14:30		(10-16)		Unifor, Fortaleza

April 23; 16:00	Paraguay	27 – 18	Chile	Unifor, Fortaleza
April 23; 16:00		(12-8)		Unifor, Fortaleza

April 23; 17:30	Canada	8 – 36	Brazil	Unifor, Fortaleza
April 23; 17:30		(6-15)		Unifor, Fortaleza

April 24; 14:30	Argentina	41 – 17	Canada	Unifor, Fortaleza
April 24; 14:30		(19-8)		Unifor, Fortaleza

April 24; 16:00	Uruguay	20 – 30	Paraguay	Unifor, Fortaleza
April 24; 16:00		(8-13)		Unifor, Fortaleza

April 24; 17:30	Brazil	31 – 17	Chile	Unifor, Fortaleza
April 24; 17:30		(15-9)		Unifor, Fortaleza

April 25; 14:30	Uruguay	37 – 19	Canada	Unifor, Fortaleza
April 25; 14:30		(18-7)		Unifor, Fortaleza

April 25; 16:00	Argentina	28 – 20	Chile	Unifor, Fortaleza
April 25; 16:00		(11-9)		Unifor, Fortaleza

April 25; 17:30	Paraguay	24 – 26	Brazil	Unifor, Fortaleza
April 25; 17:30		(12-12)		Unifor, Fortaleza

April 26; 17:00	Canada	20 – 27	Chile	Unifor, Fortaleza
April 26; 17:00		(8-15)		Unifor, Fortaleza

April 26; 18:30	Paraguay	24 – 20	Argentina	Unifor, Fortaleza
April 26; 18:30		(10-8)		Unifor, Fortaleza

April 26; 20:00	Brazil	31 – 24	Uruguay	Unifor, Fortaleza
April 26; 20:00		(16-15)		Unifor, Fortaleza

== Final standing ==
Rank	Team
Gold medal	Brazil
Silver medal	Paraguay
Bronze medal	Argentina
4	Uruguay
5	Chile
6	Canada

Team advanced to the 2014 Women's Youth World Handball Championship
