= 2003 Pan American Women's Youth Handball Championship =

Women's Youth Handball Championship

2003 Pan American Handball Women's Youth Championship
Tournament details
- Host country: Brazil
- Venue(s): 2 (in 2 host cities)
- Dates: September 24–28
- Teams: 8

Final positions
- Champions: Brazil
- Runners-up: Argentina
- Third place: Chile
- Fourth place: Uruguay

Tournament statistics
- Matches played: 20
- Goals scored: 987 (49.35 per match)

The 2003 American Handball Women's Youth Championships took place in São José dos Pinhais and Curitiba from September 24 – 28.

== Teams ==
Group A	Group B
Brazil; Chile; Greenland; Puerto Rico	Argentina; Canada; Paraguay; Uruguay

== Preliminary round ==
=== Group A ===
Team	Pld	W	D	L	GF	GA	GD	Pts
Brazil	3	3	0	0	119	38	+81	6
Chile	3	2	0	1	80	66	+14	4
Puerto Rico	3	1	0	2	49	98	–49	2
Greenland	3	0	0	3	56	102	–46	0

September 24; 10:00	Puerto Rico	15 – 34	Chile	Ginásio Nelson Almir de Almeida, Curitiba
September 24; 10:00		(8–21)		Ginásio Nelson Almir de Almeida, Curitiba

September 24; 16:30	Brazil	47 – 13	Greenland	Ginásio Ney Braga, São José dos Pinhais
September 24; 16:30		(23–7)		Ginásio Ney Braga, São José dos Pinhais

September 25; 13:00	Chile	31 – 21	Greenland	Ginásio Ney Braga, São José dos Pinhais
September 25; 13:00		(11–5)		Ginásio Ney Braga, São José dos Pinhais

September 25; 18:00	Brazil	42 – 10	Puerto Rico	Ginásio Nelson Almir de Almeida, Curitiba
September 25; 18:00		(22–7)		Ginásio Nelson Almir de Almeida, Curitiba

September 26; 13:30	Puerto Rico	24 – 22	Greenland	Ginásio Nelson Almir de Almeida, Curitiba
September 26; 13:30		(12–9)		Ginásio Nelson Almir de Almeida, Curitiba

September 26; 18:00	Brazil	30 – 15	Chile	Ginásio Ney Braga, São José dos Pinhais
September 26; 18:00		(11–8)		Ginásio Ney Braga, São José dos Pinhais

=== Group B ===
Team	Pld	W	D	L	GF	GA	GD	Pts
Argentina	3	3	0	0	92	54	+38	6
Uruguay	3	2	0	1	74	62	+12	4
Paraguay	3	1	0	2	62	65	–3	2
Canada	3	0	0	3	39	86	–47	0

September 24; 12:00	Uruguay	24 – 19	Paraguay	Ginásio Ney Braga, São José dos Pinhais
September 24; 12:00		(8–9)		Ginásio Ney Braga, São José dos Pinhais

September 24; 13:00	Argentina	31 – 16	Canada	Ginásio Nelson Almir de Almeida, Curitiba
September 24; 13:00		(16–8)		Ginásio Nelson Almir de Almeida, Curitiba

September 25; 15:00	Argentina	31 – 15	Paraguay	Ginásio Nelson Almir de Almeida, Curitiba
September 25; 15:00		(11–7)		Ginásio Nelson Almir de Almeida, Curitiba

September 25; 16:30	Uruguay	27 – 13	Canada	Ginásio Ney Braga, São José dos Pinhais
September 25; 16:30		(11–7)		Ginásio Ney Braga, São José dos Pinhais

September 26; 12:00	Paraguay	28 – 10	Canada	Ginásio Ney Braga, São José dos Pinhais
September 26; 12:00		(14–2)		Ginásio Ney Braga, São José dos Pinhais

September 26; 18:00	Argentina	30 – 23	Uruguay	Ginásio Nelson Almir de Almeida, Curitiba
September 26; 18:00		(16–12)		Ginásio Nelson Almir de Almeida, Curitiba

== Placement 5th–8th ==
September 27; 13:30	Paraguay	31 – 25	Greenland	Ginásio Nelson Almir de Almeida, Curitiba
September 27; 13:30		(16–13)		Ginásio Nelson Almir de Almeida, Curitiba

September 27; 16:30	Puerto Rico	16 – 23	Canada	Ginásio Nelson Almir de Almeida, Curitiba
September 27; 16:30		(8–11)		Ginásio Nelson Almir de Almeida, Curitiba

=== 7th/8th ===
September 28; 9:00	Greenland	30 – 29	Puerto Rico	Ginásio Nelson Almir de Almeida, Curitiba
September 28; 9:00		(15–10)		Ginásio Nelson Almir de Almeida, Curitiba

=== 5th/6th ===
September 28; 10:30	Paraguay	25 – 9	Canada	Ginásio Ney Braga, São José dos Pinhais
September 28; 10:30		(12–7)		Ginásio Ney Braga, São José dos Pinhais

== Final round ==
Semifinal
September 27 – São José dos Pinhais
Brazil	42
Uruguay	13
September 27 – São José dos Pinhais
Chile	19
Argentina	37

Final
September 28 – São José dos Pinhais
Brazil	39
Argentina	23
Third place
September 28 – Curitiba
Uruguay	27
Chile	28

=== Semifinals ===
September 27; 13:30	Argentina	37 – 19	Chile	Ginásio Ney Braga, São José dos Pinhais
September 27; 13:30		(13–9)		Ginásio Ney Braga, São José dos Pinhais

September 27; 18:00	Brazil	42 – 13	Uruguay	Ginásio Ney Braga, São José dos Pinhais
September 27; 18:00		(20–7)		Ginásio Ney Braga, São José dos Pinhais

=== Bronze medal match ===
September 28; 12:00	Uruguay	27 – 28	Chile	Ginásio Nelson Almir de Almeida, Curitiba
September 28; 12:00		(12–11)		Ginásio Nelson Almir de Almeida, Curitiba

=== Gold medal match ===
September 28; 15:00	Brazil	39 – 23	Argentina	Ginásio Ney Braga, São José dos Pinhais
September 28; 15:00		(18–8)		Ginásio Ney Braga, São José dos Pinhais

== Final standing ==
Rank	Team
Gold medal	Brazil
Silver medal	Argentina
Bronze medal	Chile
4	Uruguay
5	Paraguay
6	Canada
7	Greenland
8	Puerto Rico
