= 2008 Pan American Women's Youth Handball Championship =

2008 Pan American Handball Women's Youth Championship
Tournament details
- Host country: Brazil
- Venue: 1 (in 1 host city)
- Dates: September 2–6
- Teams: 6

Final positions
- Champions: Brazil
- Runners-up: Argentina
- Third place: Uruguay
- Fourth place: Chile

Tournament statistics
- Matches played: 15
- Goals scored: 819 (54.6 per match)

The 2008 American Handball Women's Youth Championships took place in Blumenau from September 2 – 6.

== Results ==
Team	Pld	W	D	L	GF	GA	GD	Pts
Brazil	5	5	0	0	201	95	+106	10
Argentina	5	3	1	1	157	108	+49	7
Uruguay	5	3	1	1	142	126	+16	7
Chile	5	2	0	3	125	161	–36	4
Paraguay	5	1	0	4	94	157	–63	2
Canada	5	0	0	5	100	172	–72	0

September 2; 12:30	Uruguay	33 – 18	Paraguay	Centro Esportivo Bernardo Werner, SESI, Quadra I, Blumenau

September 2; 12:30	Argentina	37 – 23	Chile	Centro Esportivo Bernardo Werner, SESI, Quadra II, Blumenau

September 2; 17:45	Brazil	46 – 15	Canada	Centro Esportivo Bernardo Werner, SESI, Quadra I, Blumenau
September 2; 17:45		(23-6)		Centro Esportivo Bernardo Werner, SESI, Quadra I, Blumenau

September 3; 12:30	Uruguay	36 – 24	Canada	Centro Esportivo Bernardo Werner, SESI, Quadra I, Blumenau

September 3; 12:30	Argentina	28 – 16	Paraguay	Centro Esportivo Bernardo Werner, SESI, Quadra II, Blumenau

September 3; 17:45	Brazil	54 – 19	Chile	Centro Esportivo Bernardo Werner, SESI, Quadra I, Blumenau
September 3; 17:45		(26-11)		Centro Esportivo Bernardo Werner, SESI, Quadra I, Blumenau

September 4; 12:30	Chile	32 – 19	Paraguay	Centro Esportivo Bernardo Werner, SESI, Quadra I, Blumenau

September 4; 12:30	Argentina	41 – 15	Canada	Centro Esportivo Bernardo Werner, SESI, Quadra II, Blumenau

September 4; 17:45	Brazil	32 – 19	Uruguay	Centro Esportivo Bernardo Werner, SESI, Quadra I, Blumenau
September 4; 17:45		(15-10)		Centro Esportivo Bernardo Werner, SESI, Quadra I, Blumenau

September 5; 12:30	Argentina	25 – 25	Uruguay	Centro Esportivo Bernardo Werner, SESI, Quadra I, Blumenau

September 5; 12:30	Chile	24 – 22	Canada	Centro Esportivo Bernardo Werner, SESI, Quadra II, Blumenau

September 5; 17:45	Brazil	40 – 16	Paraguay	Centro Esportivo Bernardo Werner, SESI, Quadra I, Blumenau
September 5; 17:45		(20-4)		Centro Esportivo Bernardo Werner, SESI, Quadra I, Blumenau

September 6; 12:30	Uruguay	29 – 27	Chile	Centro Esportivo Bernardo Werner, SESI, Quadra I, Blumenau

September 6; 12:30	Canada	24 – 25	Paraguay	Centro Esportivo Bernardo Werner, SESI, Quadra II, Blumenau

September 6; 17:45	Brazil	29 – 26	Argentina	Centro Esportivo Bernardo Werner, SESI, Quadra I, Blumenau
September 6; 17:45		(15-13)		Centro Esportivo Bernardo Werner, SESI, Quadra I, Blumenau

== Final standing ==
Rank	Team
Gold medal	Brazil
Silver medal	Argentina
Bronze medal	Uruguay
4	Chile
5	Paraguay
6	Canada
