= 2005 Pan American Women's Youth Handball Championship =

2005 Pan American Handball Women's Youth Championship
Tournament details
- Host country: Brazil
- Venue: 1 (in 1 host city)
- Dates: September 6–10
- Teams: 8

Final positions
- Champions: Brazil
- Runners-up: Argentina
- Third place: Greenland
- Fourth place: Uruguay

Tournament statistics
- Matches played: 20
- Goals scored: 862 (43.1 per match)

The 2005 American Handball Women's Youth Championships took place in Brusque from September 6 – 10. It acts as the Pan American qualifying tournament for the 2006 World Youth Women's Handball Championship.

== Teams ==
Group A	Group B
Brazil; Chile; Greenland; Paraguay	Argentina; Mexico; Puerto Rico; Uruguay

== Preliminary round ==
=== Group A ===
Team	Pld	W	D	L	GF	GA	GD	Pts
Brazil	3	3	0	0	98	40	+58	6
Greenland	3	2	0	1	69	60	+9	4
Chile	3	1	0	2	47	81	–34	2
Paraguay	3	0	0	3	39	72	–33	0

September 6; 11:00	Paraguay	15 – 22	Greenland	Arena Multiuso, Brusque
September 6; 11:00		(8–12)		Arena Multiuso, Brusque

September 6; 17:30	Brazil	39 – 11	Chile	Arena Multiuso, Brusque
September 6; 17:30		(15–6)		Arena Multiuso, Brusque

September 7; 14:30	Paraguay	15 – 20	Chile	Ginásio Arthur Scholosser, Brusque
September 7; 14:30		(4–12)		Ginásio Arthur Scholosser, Brusque

September 7; 17:30	Brazil	29 – 20	Greenland	Arena Multiuso, Brusque
September 7; 17:30		(14–8)		Arena Multiuso, Brusque

September 8; 11:00	Greenland	27 – 16	Chile	Arena Multiuso, Brusque
September 8; 11:00		(7–6)		Arena Multiuso, Brusque

September 8; 17:30	Brazil	30 – 9	Paraguay	Arena Multiuso, Brusque
September 8; 17:30		(17–4)		Arena Multiuso, Brusque

=== Group B ===
Team	Pld	W	D	L	GF	GA	GD	Pts
Argentina	3	3	0	0	84	55	+29	6
Uruguay	3	2	0	1	92	56	+36	4
Mexico	3	1	0	2	75	66	+9	2
Puerto Rico	3	0	0	3	33	107	–74	0

September 6; 12:45	Argentina	36 – 15	Puerto Rico	Arena Multiuso, Brusque
September 6; 12:45		(17–6)		Arena Multiuso, Brusque

September 6; 14:30	Uruguay	33 – 23	Mexico	Ginásio Arthur Scholosser, Brusque
September 6; 14:30		(17–11)		Ginásio Arthur Scholosser, Brusque

September 7; 11:00	Argentina	23 – 21	Mexico	Arena Multiuso, Brusque
September 7; 11:00		(14–12)		Arena Multiuso, Brusque

September 7; 12:45	Uruguay	40 – 8	Puerto Rico	Arena Multiuso, Brusque
September 7; 12:45		(17–8)		Arena Multiuso, Brusque

September 8; 14:30	Argentina	25 – 19	Uruguay	Arena Multiuso, Brusque
September 8; 14:30		(12–9)		Arena Multiuso, Brusque

September 8; 17:30	Mexico	31 – 10	Puerto Rico	Ginásio Arthur Scholosser, Brusque
September 8; 17:30		(16–4)		Ginásio Arthur Scholosser, Brusque

== Placement 5th–8th ==
September 9; 14:30	Chile	19 – 12	Puerto Rico	Ginásio Arthur Scholosser, Brusque
September 9; 14:30		(7–6)		Ginásio Arthur Scholosser, Brusque

September 9; 15:45	Mexico	24 – 22	Paraguay	Ginásio Arthur Scholosser, Brusque
September 9; 15:45		(11–10)		Ginásio Arthur Scholosser, Brusque

=== 7th/8th ===
September 10; 12:45	Puerto Rico	11 – 15	Paraguay	Ginásio Arthur Scholosser, Brusque
September 10; 12:45		(5–8)		Ginásio Arthur Scholosser, Brusque

=== 5th/6th ===
September 10; 15:45	Chile	11 – 30	Mexico	Ginásio Arthur Scholosser, Brusque
September 10; 15:45		(4–13)		Ginásio Arthur Scholosser, Brusque

== Final round ==
Semifinal
September 9 – Brusque
Brazil	36
Uruguay	17
September 9 – Brusque
Greenland	12
Argentina	20

Final
September 10 – Brusque
Brazil	28
Argentina	20
Third place
September 10 – Brusque
Uruguay	25
Greenland	26

=== Semifinals ===
September 9; 11:00	Argentina	20 – 12	Greenland	Arena Multiuso, Brusque
September 9; 11:00		(8–2)		Arena Multiuso, Brusque

September 9; 19:15	Brazil	36 – 17	Uruguay	Arena Multiuso, Brusque
September 9; 19:15		(17–5)		Arena Multiuso, Brusque

=== Bronze medal match ===
September 10; 9:00	Greenland	26 – 25	Uruguay	Arena Multiuso, Brusque
September 10; 9:00		(15–14)		Arena Multiuso, Brusque

=== Gold medal match ===
September 10; 17:30	Brazil	28 – 20	Argentina	Arena Multiuso, Brusque
September 10; 17:30		(12–12)		Arena Multiuso, Brusque

== Final standing ==
Rank	Team
Gold medal	Brazil
Silver medal	Argentina
Bronze medal	Greenland
4	Uruguay
5	Mexico
6	Chile
7	Paraguay
8	Puerto Rico

Team advanced to the 2006 World Youth Women's Handball Championship
