= 2018 Pan American Women's Youth Handball Championship =

Tournament details
- Host country: Argentina
- Venue(s): 1 (in 1 host city)
- Dates: 10–14 April
- Teams: 6 (from 1 confederation)

Final positions
- Champions: Brazil (12th title)
- Runners-up: Chile
- Third place: Argentina
- Fourth place: Uruguay

Tournament statistics
- Matches played: 15
- Goals scored: 730 (48.67 per match)
- Top scorer(s): (Brazil) Fernanda Paulino (35 goals)

The 2018 Pan American Women's Youth Handball Championship was the 12th edition of the tournament, held in the city of Buenos Aires, Argentina at the CeNARD from 10 to 14 April 2018. It acts as the American qualifying tournament for the 2018 Women's Youth World Handball Championship.

== Results ==
Pos	Team	Pld	W	D	L	GF	GA	GD	Pts
1	Brazil	5	5	0	0	161	89	+72	10
2	Chile	5	4	0	1	145	86	+59	8
3	Argentina (H)	5	3	0	2	118	89	+29	6
4	Uruguay	5	2	0	3	101	122	−21	4
5	Paraguay	5	1	0	4	141	103	+38	2
6	Peru	5	0	0	5	64	241	−177	0

Source: handballargentina.org
(H) Hosts

== Round robin ==
All times are local (UTC−03:00).

10 April 2018; 15:00	Paraguay	58–6	Peru	CeNARD, Buenos Aires; Referees: Correa, Correa (BRA)
10 April 2018; 15:00	Vergara 9	(26–1)	García 2	CeNARD, Buenos Aires; Referees: Correa, Correa (BRA)
10 April 2018; 15:00	2× (suspension)	Report	5× (suspension) 1× (red card)	CeNARD, Buenos Aires; Referees: Correa, Correa (BRA)

10 April 2018; 17:00	Brazil	26–23	Chile	CeNARD, Buenos Aires; Referees: Burgos, Delgado (ARG)
10 April 2018; 17:00	Paulino 8	(16–10)	Alarcón 7	CeNARD, Buenos Aires; Referees: Burgos, Delgado (ARG)
10 April 2018; 17:00	1× (yellow card) 3× (suspension)	Report	1× (yellow card) 1× (suspension)	CeNARD, Buenos Aires; Referees: Burgos, Delgado (ARG)

10 April 2018; 19:30	Argentina	20–18	Uruguay	CeNARD, Buenos Aires; Attendance: 865; Referees: Moraga, Zavalla (CHI)
10 April 2018; 19:30	Benedetti, Turnes 5	(13–6)	Vallarino 6	CeNARD, Buenos Aires; Attendance: 865; Referees: Moraga, Zavalla (CHI)
10 April 2018; 19:30	1× (yellow card) 2× (suspension)	Report	3× (yellow card) 8× (suspension) 1× (red card)	CeNARD, Buenos Aires; Attendance: 865; Referees: Moraga, Zavalla (CHI)

11 April 2018; 15:00	Chile	26–22	Paraguay	CeNARD, Buenos Aires; Attendance: 128; Referees: Burgos, Delgado (ARG)
11 April 2018; 15:00	V. Sepúlveda 9	(14–15)	Ortíz 9	CeNARD, Buenos Aires; Attendance: 128; Referees: Burgos, Delgado (ARG)
11 April 2018; 15:00	1× (yellow card) 3× (suspension)	Report	6× (suspension)	CeNARD, Buenos Aires; Attendance: 128; Referees: Burgos, Delgado (ARG)

11 April 2018; 17:00	Uruguay	15–35	Brazil	CeNARD, Buenos Aires; Referees: Estrada, Pineda (COL)
11 April 2018; 17:00	four players 3	(6–15)	Paulino 7	CeNARD, Buenos Aires; Referees: Estrada, Pineda (COL)
11 April 2018; 17:00	1× (yellow card) 2× (suspension) 1× (red card)	Report	1× (yellow card) 2× (suspension)	CeNARD, Buenos Aires; Referees: Estrada, Pineda (COL)

11 April 2018; 19:00	Peru	13–53	Argentina	CeNARD, Buenos Aires; Attendance: 635; Referees: Moraga, Zavalla (CHI)
11 April 2018; 19:00	Romero 5	(6–29)	Cavo 9	CeNARD, Buenos Aires; Attendance: 635; Referees: Moraga, Zavalla (CHI)
11 April 2018; 19:00	7× (suspension)	Report	1× (yellow card) 3× (suspension)	CeNARD, Buenos Aires; Attendance: 635; Referees: Moraga, Zavalla (CHI)

12 April 2018; 15:00	Chile	27–13	Uruguay	CeNARD, Buenos Aires; Referees: Correa, Correa (BRA)
12 April 2018; 15:00	Parra, V. Sepúlveda 6	(13–9)	four players 2	CeNARD, Buenos Aires; Referees: Correa, Correa (BRA)
12 April 2018; 15:00	3× (yellow card) 2× (suspension)	Report	3× (yellow card) 4× (suspension) 1× (red card)	CeNARD, Buenos Aires; Referees: Correa, Correa (BRA)

12 April 2018; 17:00	Brazil	48–12	Peru	CeNARD, Buenos Aires; Attendance: 200; Referees: Burgos, Delgado (ARG)
12 April 2018; 17:00	Paulino 10	(25–6)	Delgado 5	CeNARD, Buenos Aires; Attendance: 200; Referees: Burgos, Delgado (ARG)
12 April 2018; 17:00	2× (yellow card) 1× (suspension)	Report	3× (suspension)	CeNARD, Buenos Aires; Attendance: 200; Referees: Burgos, Delgado (ARG)

12 April 2018; 19:00	Paraguay	17–18	Argentina	CeNARD, Buenos Aires; Attendance: 875; Referees: Estrada, Pineda (COL)
12 April 2018; 19:00	Méndez 4	(8–10)	Bono 5	CeNARD, Buenos Aires; Attendance: 875; Referees: Estrada, Pineda (COL)
12 April 2018; 19:00	2× (yellow card) 6× (suspension)	Report	2× (suspension)	CeNARD, Buenos Aires; Attendance: 875; Referees: Estrada, Pineda (COL)

13 April 2018; 15:00	Peru	14–49	Chile	CeNARD, Buenos Aires; Attendance: 123; Referees: Estrada, Pineda (COL)
13 April 2018; 15:00	Delgado 7	(7–24)	Rebolledo 10	CeNARD, Buenos Aires; Attendance: 123; Referees: Estrada, Pineda (COL)
13 April 2018; 15:00	1× (yellow card) 5× (suspension)	Report	2× (suspension)	CeNARD, Buenos Aires; Attendance: 123; Referees: Estrada, Pineda (COL)

13 April 2018; 17:00	Paraguay	21–22	Uruguay	CeNARD, Buenos Aires; Attendance: 422; Referees: Burgos, Delgado (ARG)
13 April 2018; 17:00	Gaona, Ugarriza 6	(9–7)	Caruso 6	CeNARD, Buenos Aires; Attendance: 422; Referees: Burgos, Delgado (ARG)
13 April 2018; 17:00	2× (yellow card) 3× (suspension)	Report	2× (yellow card) 4× (suspension)	CeNARD, Buenos Aires; Attendance: 422; Referees: Burgos, Delgado (ARG)

13 April 2018; 19:00	Argentina	16–21	Brazil	CeNARD, Buenos Aires; Attendance: 1,500; Referees: Moraga, Zavalla (CHI)
13 April 2018; 19:00	Benedetti 6	(9–12)	Wippel 11	CeNARD, Buenos Aires; Attendance: 1,500; Referees: Moraga, Zavalla (CHI)
13 April 2018; 19:00	2× (yellow card) 1× (suspension)	Report	1× (yellow card) 4× (suspension)	CeNARD, Buenos Aires; Attendance: 1,500; Referees: Moraga, Zavalla (CHI)

14 April 2018; 15:00	Uruguay	33–19	Peru	CeNARD, Buenos Aires; Attendance: 200; Referees: Correa, Correa (BRA)
14 April 2018; 15:00	Ungo 7	(16–9)	Romero 4	CeNARD, Buenos Aires; Attendance: 200; Referees: Correa, Correa (BRA)
14 April 2018; 15:00	1× (yellow card) 1× (suspension)	Report	1× (yellow card) 6× (suspension)	CeNARD, Buenos Aires; Attendance: 200; Referees: Correa, Correa (BRA)

14 April 2018; 17:15	Argentina	11–20	Chile	CeNARD, Buenos Aires; Attendance: 2,000; Referees: Estrada, Pineda (COL)
14 April 2018; 17:15	Benedetti 6	(6–10)	Parra 8	CeNARD, Buenos Aires; Attendance: 2,000; Referees: Estrada, Pineda (COL)
14 April 2018; 17:15	2× (yellow card) 3× (suspension)	Report	1× (yellow card) 2× (suspension)	CeNARD, Buenos Aires; Attendance: 2,000; Referees: Estrada, Pineda (COL)

14 April 2018; 19:30	Brazil	31–23	Paraguay	CeNARD, Buenos Aires; Attendance: 415; Referees: Moraga, Zavalla (CHI)
14 April 2018; 19:30	Paulino 6	(17–12)	Ortíz 8	CeNARD, Buenos Aires; Attendance: 415; Referees: Moraga, Zavalla (CHI)
14 April 2018; 19:30	1× (yellow card) 2× (suspension)	Report		CeNARD, Buenos Aires; Attendance: 415; Referees: Moraga, Zavalla (CHI)

== Final standing ==
Rank	Team
1st place, gold medalist(s)	Brazil
2nd place, silver medalist(s)	Chile
3rd place, bronze medalist(s)	Argentina
4	Uruguay
5	Paraguay
6	Peru

Team qualified to the 2018 Women's Youth World Handball Championship
