= 2006 Pan American Women's Youth Handball Championship =

2006 Pan American Handball Women's Youth Championship
Tournament details
- Host country: Brazil
- Venue: 1 (in 1 host city)
- Dates: August 29–September 2
- Teams: 6

Final positions
- Champions: Brazil
- Runners-up: Argentina
- Third place: Uruguay
- Fourth place: Paraguay

Tournament statistics
- Matches played: 15
- Goals scored: 681 (45.4 per match)
- Top scorers: Fernanda da Silva (BRA) (37 goals)

The 2006 American Handball Women's Youth Championships took place in Blumenau from August 29 – September 2.

== Results ==
Team	Pld	W	D	L	GF	GA	GD	Pts
Brazil	5	5	0	0	178	80	+98	10
Argentina	5	4	0	1	130	92	+38	8
Uruguay	5	3	0	2	117	87	+30	6
Paraguay	5	2	0	3	86	135	–49	4
Chile	5	1	0	4	91	137	–46	2
Mexico	5	0	0	5	79	160	–81	0

August 29; 15:00	Chile	11 – 27	Argentina	Centro Esportivo Bernardo Werner, Blumenau
August 29; 15:00		(3–10)		Centro Esportivo Bernardo Werner, Blumenau

August 29; 16:45	Mexico	12 – 27	Uruguay	Centro Esportivo Bernardo Werner, Blumenau
August 29; 16:45		(7–13)		Centro Esportivo Bernardo Werner, Blumenau

August 29; 18:30	Brazil	35 – 13	Paraguay	Centro Esportivo Bernardo Werner, Blumenau
August 29; 18:30		(13–8)		Centro Esportivo Bernardo Werner, Blumenau

August 30; 15:00	Paraguay	29 – 19	Mexico	Centro Esportivo Bernardo Werner, Blumenau
August 30; 15:00		(15–11)		Centro Esportivo Bernardo Werner, Blumenau

August 30; 16:45	Uruguay	19 – 20	Argentina	Centro Esportivo Bernardo Werner, Blumenau
August 30; 16:45		(4–11)		Centro Esportivo Bernardo Werner, Blumenau

August 30; 18:00	Brazil	42 – 15	Chile	Centro Esportivo Bernardo Werner, Blumenau
August 30; 18:00		(24–9)		Centro Esportivo Bernardo Werner, Blumenau

August 31; 15:00	Uruguay	27 – 18	Chile	Centro Esportivo Bernardo Werner, Blumenau
August 31; 15:00		(15–10)		Centro Esportivo Bernardo Werner, Blumenau

August 31; 16:45	Paraguay	11 – 32	Argentina	Centro Esportivo Bernardo Werner, Blumenau
August 31; 16:45		(2–15)		Centro Esportivo Bernardo Werner, Blumenau

August 31; 18:00	Mexico	9 – 44	Brazil	Centro Esportivo Bernardo Werner, Blumenau
August 31; 18:00		(3–17)		Centro Esportivo Bernardo Werner, Blumenau

September 1; 15:00	Paraguay	19 – 17	Chile	Centro Esportivo Bernardo Werner, Blumenau
September 1; 15:00		(11–5)		Centro Esportivo Bernardo Werner, Blumenau

September 1; 15:15	Uruguay	22 – 23	Brazil	Centro Esportivo Bernardo Werner, Blumenau
September 1; 15:15		(10–11)		Centro Esportivo Bernardo Werner, Blumenau

September 1; 18:00	Argentina	30 – 17	Mexico	Centro Esportivo Bernardo Werner, Blumenau
September 1; 18:00		(13–7)		Centro Esportivo Bernardo Werner, Blumenau

September 2; 13:30	Chile	30 – 22	Mexico	Centro Esportivo Bernardo Werner, Blumenau
September 2; 13:30		(13–11)		Centro Esportivo Bernardo Werner, Blumenau

September 2; 17:00	Brazil	34 – 21	Argentina	Centro Esportivo Bernardo Werner, Blumenau
September 2; 17:00		(15–12)		Centro Esportivo Bernardo Werner, Blumenau

September 2; 18:30	Uruguay	22 – 14	Paraguay	Centro Esportivo Bernardo Werner, Blumenau
September 2; 18:30		(12–9)		Centro Esportivo Bernardo Werner, Blumenau

== Final standing ==
Rank	Team
Gold medal	Brazil
Silver medal	Argentina
Bronze medal	Uruguay
4	Paraguay
5	Chile
6	Mexico
