= 2012 Pan American Women's Junior Handball Championship =

2012 handball event

Tournament details
- Host country: Dominican Republic
- Venue(s): 1 (in 1 host city)
- Dates: March 15–19
- Teams: 8

Final positions
- Champions: Brazil
- Runners-up: Uruguay
- Third place: Argentina
- Fourth place: Canada

Tournament statistics
- Matches played: 20
- Goals scored: 1,099 (54.95 per match)
- Top scorer(s): Carolina López (DOM)

Awards
- Best player: Deborah Nunes (BRA)

The 2012 Pan American Women's Junior Handball Championship took place in Santo Domingo from March 15 to March 19. It acts as the Pan American qualifying tournament for the 2012 Women's Junior World Handball Championship.

== Teams ==
Group A	Group B
Brazil; Puerto Rico; Uruguay; Chile	Argentina; Dominican Republic; Canada; United States

== Preliminary round ==
=== Group A ===
Team	Pld	W	D	L	GF	GA	GD	Pts
Brazil	3	3	0	0	117	51	+66	6
Uruguay	3	2	0	1	112	65	+47	4
Chile	3	1	0	2	63	95	-32	2
Puerto Rico	3	0	0	3	53	134	-81	0

March 15; 13:00	Brazil	26 – 25	Uruguay	Santo Domingo
March 15; 13:00		(13–12)		Santo Domingo

March 15; 20:00	Puerto Rico	21 – 30	Chile	Santo Domingo
March 15; 20:00		(8–16)		Santo Domingo

March 16; 13:00	Chile	13 – 37	Brazil	Santo Domingo
March 16; 13:00		(8–16)		Santo Domingo

March 16; 15:00	Uruguay	50 – 19	Puerto Rico	Santo Domingo
March 16; 15:00		(20–11)		Santo Domingo

March 17; 13:00	Brazil	54 – 13	Puerto Rico	Santo Domingo
March 17; 13:00		(24–4)		Santo Domingo

March 17; 15:00	Uruguay	37 – 20	Chile	Santo Domingo
March 17; 15:00		(21–8)		Santo Domingo

=== Group B ===
Team	Pld	W	D	L	GF	GA	GD	Pts
Argentina	3	3	0	0	88	55	+33	6
Canada	3	2	0	1	74	78	-4	4
Dominican Republic	3	1	0	2	79	71	+8	2
United States	3	0	0	3	42	79	-37	0

March 15; 16:00	Dominican Republic	30 – 11	United States	Santo Domingo
March 15; 16:00		(13–5)		Santo Domingo

March 15; 18:00	Argentina	34 – 19	Canada	Santo Domingo
March 15; 18:00		(16–6)		Santo Domingo

March 16; 17:00	United States	14 – 30	Argentina	Santo Domingo
March 16; 17:00		(5–12)		Santo Domingo

March 16; 19:00	Canada	36 – 27	Dominican Republic	Santo Domingo
March 16; 19:00		(18–13)		Santo Domingo

March 17; 17:00	Canada	19 – 17	United States	Santo Domingo
March 17; 17:00		(11–9)		Santo Domingo

March 17; 19:00	Argentina	24 – 22	Dominican Republic	Santo Domingo
March 17; 19:00		(14–8)		Santo Domingo

== Placement 5th–8th ==
March 18; 9:00	Chile	33 – 24	United States	Santo Domingo
March 18; 9:00		(15–10)		Santo Domingo

March 18; 11:00	Dominican Republic	29 – 28	Puerto Rico	Santo Domingo
March 18; 11:00		(16–15)		Santo Domingo

=== 7th/8th ===
March 19; 9:00	United States	26 – 29	Puerto Rico	Santo Domingo
March 19; 9:00		(14–20)		Santo Domingo

=== 5th/6th ===
March 19; 11:00	Chile	33 – 35 OT	Dominican Republic	Santo Domingo
March 19; 11:00		(11–9, 23–23, 30–30)		Santo Domingo

== Final round ==
Semifinal
March 18 – Santo Domingo
Brazil	42
Canada	16
March 18 – Santo Domingo
Uruguay	29
Argentina	26

Final
March 19 – Santo Domingo
Brazil	37
Uruguay	33
Third place
March 19 – Santo Domingo
Canada	21
Argentina	30

=== Semifinals ===
March 18; 16:00	Brazil	42 – 16	Canada	Santo Domingo
March 18; 16:00		(21–10)		Santo Domingo

March 18; 18:00	Argentina	26 – 29	Uruguay	Santo Domingo
March 18; 18:00		(13–10)		Santo Domingo

=== Bronze medal match ===
March 19; 16:00	Canada	21 – 30	Argentina	Santo Domingo
March 19; 16:00		(10–18)		Santo Domingo

=== Gold medal match ===
March 19; 18:00	Brazil	37 – 33	Uruguay	Santo Domingo
March 19; 18:00		(19–16)		Santo Domingo

== Final standing ==
Rank	Team
Gold medal	Brazil
Silver medal	Uruguay
Bronze medal	Argentina
4	Canada
5	Dominican Republic
6	Chile
7	Puerto Rico
8	United States

Team advanced to the 2012 Women's Junior World Handball Championship
