= Deborah Nunes =

Brazilian handball player (born 1993)

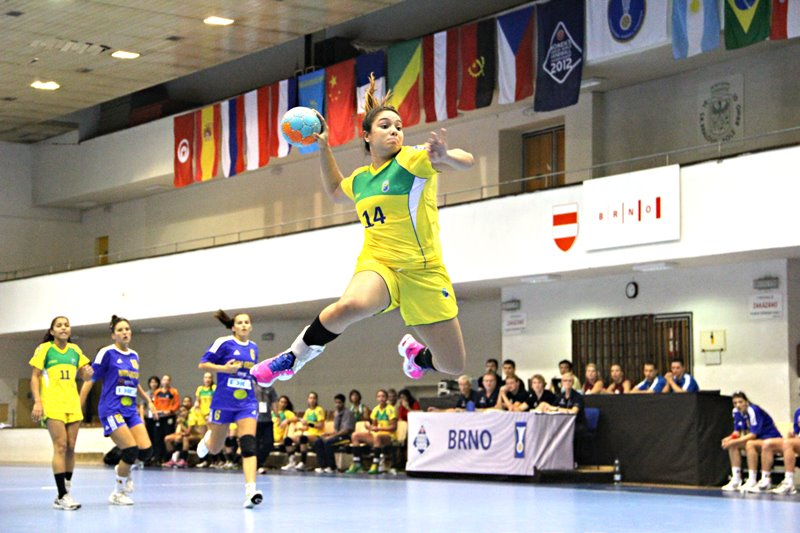

Personal information
- Full name: Deborah Hannah Pontes Nunes
- Born: 14 March 1993 (age 33) Recife, Brazil
- Height: 1.59 m (5 ft 3 in)

Sport
- Sport: Handball
- Position: Central back
- Number: 9

Youth career
- Years: Team
- -2012: Metodista/São Bernardo

Senior clubs
- Years: Team
- 2012-2019: Metodista/São Bernardo
- 2019-2020: HC Astrakhanochka
- 2021-2022: CB Atlético Guardés
National team
Years	Team	Apps	(Gls)
2013-	Brazil	35	(55)
Medal record
World Championship
Gold medal – first place	2013 Serbia	Team
Pan American Championship
Gold medal – first place	2013 Dominican Republic	Team
Youth Olympic Games
Bronze medal – third place	2010 Singapore	Team
Pan American Youth
Gold medal – first place	2010 Brazil	Team
Pan American Junior
Gold medal – first place	2012 Dominican Republic	Team
- Updated on 12 January 2023

Deborah Hannah Pontes Nunes (born 14 March 1993) is a Brazilian handball player. She plays for the Russian club HC Astrakhanochka and is also member of the Brazil women's national handball team. In 2013 she won the World Championship; the first time ever for Brazil and South America.

== Career ==
Nunes played in Brazil for Metodista/São Bernardo, where she won the 2012 Brazilian championship. A year later she finished second with the club.

In 2019 she signed for Russian club HC Astrakhanochka. After she had broken the quarantine rules during the COVID-19 pandemic during a stay abroad in March 2020, her contract was cancelled.

For the 2021-22 season she joined Spanish side CB Atlético Guardés.

=== National team ===
She has played in the 2012 Women's Junior World Handball Championship.

In the summer of 2013 she won the 2013 Pan American Championship with Brazil. In December the same year, she won the World Championship. She scored 11 goals during the tournament.

== Titles ==
- Pan American Women's Club Handball Championship:
  - 2016
- Liga Handebol Brasil
  - 2012
