= 2007 Pan American Women's Youth Handball Championship =

2007 Pan American Handball Women's Youth Championship
Tournament details
- Host country: Brazil
- Venue: 1 (in 1 host city)
- Dates: September 4–8
- Teams: 6

Final positions
- Champions: Brazil
- Runners-up: Argentina
- Third place: Puerto Rico
- Fourth place: Uruguay

Tournament statistics
- Matches played: 15
- Goals scored: 721 (48.07 per match)

The 2007 American Handball Women's Youth Championships took place in Cascavel from September 4 – 8. It acts as the Pan American qualifying tournament for the 2008 World Youth Women's Handball Championship.

== Results ==
Team	Pld	W	D	L	GF	GA	GD	Pts
Brazil	5	5	0	0	155	94	+61	10
Argentina	5	3	0	2	127	106	+21	6
Puerto Rico	5	3	0	2	123	125	–2	6
Uruguay	5	3	0	2	123	130	–7	6
Chile	5	0	1	4	104	134	–30	1
Paraguay	5	0	1	4	89	132	–43	1

September 4; 10:30	Uruguay	27 – 34	Puerto Rico	Ginásio de Esportes Sérgio Mauro Festugatto, Cascavel
September 4; 10:30		(9–13)		Ginásio de Esportes Sérgio Mauro Festugatto, Cascavel

September 4; 12:45	Argentina	25 – 13	Chile	Ginásio de Esportes Odilon Reinhardt, NEVA, Cascavel
September 4; 12:45		(11–6)		Ginásio de Esportes Odilon Reinhardt, NEVA, Cascavel

September 4; 15:15	Brazil	27 – 17	Paraguay	Ginásio de Esportes Sérgio Mauro Festugatto, Cascavel
September 4; 15:15		(15–8)		Ginásio de Esportes Sérgio Mauro Festugatto, Cascavel

September 5; 13:30	Paraguay	23 – 23	Chile	Ginásio de Esportes Sérgio Mauro Festugatto, Cascavel
September 5; 13:30		(8–8)		Ginásio de Esportes Sérgio Mauro Festugatto, Cascavel

September 5; 16:45	Puerto Rico	21 – 25	Argentina	Ginásio de Esportes Odilon Reinhardt, NEVA, Cascavel
September 5; 16:45		(7–16)		Ginásio de Esportes Odilon Reinhardt, NEVA, Cascavel

September 5; 20:00	Brazil	36 – 20	Uruguay	Ginásio de Esportes Sérgio Mauro Festugatto, Cascavel
September 5; 20:00		(15–10)		Ginásio de Esportes Sérgio Mauro Festugatto, Cascavel

September 6; 13:30	Paraguay	20 – 31	Argentina	Ginásio de Esportes Odilon Reinhardt, NEVA, Cascavel
September 6; 13:30		(8–12)		Ginásio de Esportes Odilon Reinhardt, NEVA, Cascavel

September 6; 13:30	Chile	23 – 28	Uruguay	Ginásio de Esportes Sérgio Mauro Festugatto, Cascavel
September 6; 13:30		(13–15)		Ginásio de Esportes Sérgio Mauro Festugatto, Cascavel

September 6; 20:00	Brazil	34 – 13	Puerto Rico	Ginásio de Esportes Sérgio Mauro Festugatto, Cascavel
September 6; 20:00		(17–5)		Ginásio de Esportes Sérgio Mauro Festugatto, Cascavel

September 7; 15:15	Argentina	22 – 23	Uruguay	Ginásio de Esportes Odilon Reinhardt, NEVA, Cascavel
September 7; 15:15		(13–13)		Ginásio de Esportes Odilon Reinhardt, NEVA, Cascavel

September 7; 15:15	Puerto Rico	26 – 14	Paraguay	Ginásio de Esportes Sérgio Mauro Festugatto, Cascavel
September 7; 15:15		(9–9)		Ginásio de Esportes Sérgio Mauro Festugatto, Cascavel

September 7; 20:00	Brazil	29 – 20	Chile	Ginásio de Esportes Sérgio Mauro Festugatto, Cascavel
September 7; 20:00		(12–10)		Ginásio de Esportes Sérgio Mauro Festugatto, Cascavel

September 8; 12:45	Chile	25 – 29	Puerto Rico	Ginásio de Esportes Odilon Reinhardt, NEVA, Cascavel
September 8; 12:45		(11–13)		Ginásio de Esportes Odilon Reinhardt, NEVA, Cascavel

September 8; 14:30	Uruguay	25 – 15	Paraguay	Ginásio de Esportes Odilon Reinhardt, NEVA, Cascavel
September 8; 14:30		(13–6)		Ginásio de Esportes Odilon Reinhardt, NEVA, Cascavel

September 8; 18:15	Brazil	29 – 24	Argentina	Ginásio de Esportes Sérgio Mauro Festugatto, Cascavel
September 8; 18:15		(12–11)		Ginásio de Esportes Sérgio Mauro Festugatto, Cascavel

== Final standing ==
Rank	Team
Gold medal	Brazil
Silver medal	Argentina
Bronze medal	Puerto Rico
4	Uruguay
5	Chile
6	Paraguay

Team advanced to the 2008 World Youth Women's Handball Championship
