= 2012 Pan American Women's Youth Handball Championship =

2012 Pan American Handball Women's Youth Championship
Tournament details
- Host country: Chile
- Venue: 1 (in 1 host city)
- Dates: May 8–12
- Teams: 6

Final positions
- Champions: Brazil
- Runners-up: Uruguay
- Third place: Paraguay
- Fourth place: Argentina

Tournament statistics
- Matches played: 15
- Goals scored: 831 (55.4 per match)
- Top scorers: Alejandra Scarrone (URU) (40 goals)

Awards
- Best player: Alejandra Scarrone (URU)

The 2012 American Handball Women's Youth Championships took place in Santiago, Chile from May 8 – 12. It acts as the Pan American qualifying tournament for the 2012 Women's Youth World Handball Championship.

== Results ==
Team	Pld	W	D	L	GF	GA	GD	Pts
Brazil	5	5	0	0	182	105	+77	10
Uruguay	5	4	0	1	194	135	+59	8
Paraguay	5	3	0	2	114	144	–30	6
Argentina	5	2	0	3	123	122	+1	4
Canada	5	1	0	4	115	152	–37	2
Chile	5	0	0	5	103	173	–70	0

May 8; 15:00	Uruguay	32 – 39	Brazil	Santiago
May 8; 15:00		(20-19)		Santiago

May 8; 17:00	Argentina	26 – 20	Canada	Santiago
May 8; 17:00		(7-9)		Santiago

May 8; 19:30	Paraguay	28 – 21	Chile	Santiago
May 8; 19:30		(16-10)		Santiago

May 9; 15:30	Uruguay	30 – 24	Argentina	Santiago
May 9; 15:30		(12-10)		Santiago

May 9; 17:30	Paraguay	16 – 41	Brazil	Santiago
May 9; 17:30		(8-24)		Santiago

May 9; 19:30	Canada	33 – 20	Chile	Santiago
May 9; 19:30		(15-11)		Santiago

May 10; 15:30	Uruguay	42 – 20	Canada	Santiago
May 10; 15:30		(20-8)		Santiago

May 10; 17:30	Argentina	17 – 18	Paraguay	Santiago
May 10; 17:30		(7-10)		Santiago

May 10; 19:30	Chile	16 – 30	Brazil	Santiago
May 10; 19:30		(6-17)		Santiago

May 11; 15:30	Brazil	41 – 22	Canada	Santiago
May 11; 15:30		(23-7)		Santiago

May 11; 17:30	Uruguay	45 – 29	Paraguay	Santiago
May 11; 17:30		(21-11)		Santiago

May 11; 19:30	Argentina	37 – 23	Chile	Santiago
May 11; 19:30		(20-9)		Santiago

May 12; 15:30	Canada	20 – 23	Paraguay	Santiago
May 12; 15:30		(12-10)		Santiago

May 12; 17:30	Uruguay	45 – 23	Chile	Santiago
May 12; 17:30		(21-10)		Santiago

May 12; 19:30	Brazil	31 – 19	Argentina	Santiago
May 12; 19:30		(16-9)		Santiago

== Final standing ==
Rank	Team
Gold medal	Brazil
Silver medal	Uruguay
Bronze medal	Paraguay
4	Argentina
5	Canada
6	Chile

Team advanced to the 2012 Women's Youth World Handball Championship

== Best team ==
- Goalkeeper: (Canada) Erica Vallée
- Right wing: (Argentina) Rocio Squizziato
- Right back: (Chile) Daniela Miño
- Central back: (Uruguay) Alejandra Scarrone
- Left back: (Brazil) Isabelle Dos Santos
- Left wing: (Uruguay) Martina Barreiro
- Pivot: (Brazil) Nadyne Keller
