= Pan American Women's Youth Handball Championship =

Sporting tournament

The Pan American Women's Youth Handball Championship was the official competition for youth women's national handball teams of Americas, and took place every two years. In addition to crowning the Pan American champions, the tournament also served as a qualifying tournament for the Youth World Championship. In 2018, the PATHF was deprived of recognition and the tournament was replaced with the IHF Trophy for North America and the Caribbean, and the South and Central American Women's Youth Handball Championship.

== Summary ==
Year	Host	Final			Third place match		
Year	Host	Champion	Score	Runner-up	Third place	Score	Fourth place
2001; Details	(Brazil); São Bernardo do Campo	Brazil	No playoffs	Argentina	Uruguay	No playoffs	Chile
2003; Details	(Brazil); São José dos Pinhais	Brazil	39–23	Argentina	Chile	28–27	Uruguay
2004; Details	(Brazil); São José dos Pinhais	Brazil	33–21	Argentina	Uruguay	25–23	Mexico
2005; Details	(Brazil); Brusque	Brazil	28–20	Argentina	Greenland	26–25	Uruguay
2006; Details	(Brazil); Blumenau	Brazil	No playoffs	Argentina	Uruguay	No playoffs	Paraguay
2007; Details	(Brazil); Cascavel	Brazil	No playoffs	Argentina	Puerto Rico	No playoffs	Uruguay
2008; Details	(Brazil); Blumenau	Brazil	No playoffs	Argentina	Uruguay	No playoffs	Chile
2010; Details	(Brazil); Balneário Camboriú	Brazil	24–23	Dominican Republic	Argentina	31–28	Uruguay
2012; Details	(Chile); Santiago	Brazil	No playoffs	Uruguay	Paraguay	No playoffs	Argentina
2014; Details	(Brazil); Fortaleza	Brazil	No playoffs	Paraguay	Argentina	No playoffs	Uruguay
2016; Details	(Chile); Santiago	Brazil	No playoffs	Paraguay	Argentina	No playoffs	Chile
2018; Details	(Argentina); Buenos Aires	Brazil	No playoffs	Chile	Argentina	No playoffs	Uruguay

== Medal table ==
Rank	Nation	Gold	Silver	Bronze	Total
1	Brazil	12	0	0	12
2	Argentina	0	7	4	11
3	Paraguay	0	2	1	3
4	Uruguay	0	1	5	6
5	Chile	0	1	1	2
6	Dominican Republic	0	1	0	1
7	Greenland	0	0	1	1
7	Puerto Rico	0	0	1	1
Totals (8 entries)		12	12	13	37

== Participating nations ==
Nation	(Brazil) 2001	(Brazil) 2003	(Brazil) 2004	(Brazil) 2005	(Brazil) 2006	(Brazil) 2007	(Brazil) 2008	(Brazil) 2010	(Chile) 2012	(Brazil) 2014	(Chile) 2016	(Argentina) 2018	Years
Argentina	2nd	2nd	2nd	2nd	2nd	2nd	2nd	3rd	4th	3rd	3rd	3rd	12
Brazil	1st	1st	1st	1st	1st	1st	1st	1st	1st	1st	1st	1st	12
Canada	-	6th	7th	-	-	-	6th	-	5th	6th	6th	-	6
Chile	4th	3rd	5th	6th	5th	5th	4th	8th	6th	5th	4th	2nd	12
Dominican Republic	-	-	-	-	-	-	-	2nd	-	-	-	-	1
Greenland	-	7th	-	3rd	-	-	-	-	-	-	-	-	2
Mexico	6th	-	4th	5th	6th	-	-	5th	-	-	-	-	5
Paraguay	5th	5th	8th	7th	4th	6th	5th	7th	3rd	2nd	2nd	5th	12
Peru	-	-	-	-	-	-	-	-	-	-	-	6th	1
Puerto Rico	-	8th	6th	8th	-	3rd	-	6th	-	-	-	-	5
Uruguay	3rd	4th	3rd	4th	3rd	4th	3rd	4th	2nd	4th	5th	4th	12
Total	6	8	8	8	6	6	6	8	6	6	6	6	
