= 2010 Pan American Women's Youth Handball Championship =

2010 Pan American Handball Women's Youth Championship
Tournament details
- Host country: Brazil
- Venue: 1 (in 1 host city)
- Dates: April 13–17
- Teams: 8

Final positions
- Champions: Brazil
- Runners-up: Dominican Republic
- Third place: Argentina
- Fourth place: Uruguay

Tournament statistics
- Matches played: 20
- Goals scored: 1,034 (51.7 per match)

The 2010 American Handball Women's Youth Championships took place in Balneário Camboriú from April 13 – 17. It acts as the Pan American qualifying tournament for the 2010 World Youth Women's Handball Championship.

== Teams ==
Group A	Group B
Brazil; Chile; Dominican Republic; Mexico	Argentina; Paraguay; Puerto Rico; Uruguay

== Preliminary round ==
=== Group A ===
Team	Pld	W	D	L	GF	GA	GD	Pts
Brazil	3	3	0	0	99	50	+49	6
Dominican Republic	3	2	0	1	82	69	+13	4
Chile	3	1	0	2	50	75	–25	2
Mexico	3	0	0	3	51	88	–37	0

April 13; 10:00	Chile	14 – 26	Dominican Republic	Ginásio de Esportes Multieventos Hamilton Linhares, Balneário Camboriú

April 13; 19:00	Brazil	36 – 10	Mexico	Ginásio de Esportes Multieventos Hamilton Linhares, Balneário Camboriú
April 13; 19:00		(15-5)		Ginásio de Esportes Multieventos Hamilton Linhares, Balneário Camboriú

April 14; 13:30	Chile	19 – 17	Mexico	Ginásio de Esportes Multieventos Hamilton Linhares, Balneário Camboriú

April 14; 19:00	Brazil	31 – 23	Dominican Republic	Ginásio de Esportes Multieventos Hamilton Linhares, Balneário Camboriú
April 14; 19:00		(18-14)		Ginásio de Esportes Multieventos Hamilton Linhares, Balneário Camboriú

April 15; 10:00	Dominican Republic	33 – 24	Mexico	Ginásio de Esportes Multieventos Hamilton Linhares, Balneário Camboriú

April 15; 19:00	Brazil	32 – 17	Chile	Ginásio de Esportes Multieventos Hamilton Linhares, Balneário Camboriú
April 15; 19:00		(15-10)		Ginásio de Esportes Multieventos Hamilton Linhares, Balneário Camboriú

=== Group B ===
Team	Pld	W	D	L	GF	GA	GD	Pts
Uruguay	3	3	0	0	110	54	+56	6
Argentina	3	2	0	1	86	61	+25	4
Paraguay	3	1	0	2	71	76	–5	2
Puerto Rico	3	0	0	3	41	117	–76	0

April 13; 13:30	Argentina	29 – 14	Paraguay	Ginásio de Esportes Multieventos Hamilton Linhares, Balneário Camboriú

April 13; 17:00	Uruguay	46 – 11	Puerto Rico	Ginásio de Esportes Multieventos Hamilton Linhares, Balneário Camboriú

April 14; 10:00	Argentina	37 – 17	Puerto Rico	Ginásio de Esportes Multieventos Hamilton Linhares, Balneário Camboriú

April 14; 17:00	Uruguay	34 – 23	Paraguay	Ginásio de Esportes Multieventos Hamilton Linhares, Balneário Camboriú

April 15; 13:30	Puerto Rico	13 – 34	Paraguay	Ginásio de Esportes Multieventos Hamilton Linhares, Balneário Camboriú

April 15; 17:00	Argentina	20 – 30	Uruguay	Ginásio de Esportes Multieventos Hamilton Linhares, Balneário Camboriú

== Placement 5th–8th ==
April 16; 10:00	Chile	26 – 28	Puerto Rico	Ginásio de Esportes Multieventos Hamilton Linhares, Balneário Camboriú

April 16; 15:30	Paraguay	20 – 22	Mexico	Ginásio de Esportes Multieventos Hamilton Linhares, Balneário Camboriú

=== 7th/8th ===
April 17; 10:00	Paraguay	32 – 24	Chile	Ginásio de Esportes Multieventos Hamilton Linhares, Balneário Camboriú

=== 5th/6th ===
April 17; 13:30	Puerto Rico	27 – 28	Mexico	Ginásio de Esportes Multieventos Hamilton Linhares, Balneário Camboriú

== Final round ==
Semifinal
April 16 – Balneário Camboriú
Brazil	32
Argentina	23
April 16 – Balneário Camboriú
Dominican Republic	40
Uruguay	36

Final
April 17 – Balneário Camboriú
Brazil	24
Dominican Republic	23
Third place
April 17 – Balneário Camboriú
Argentina	31
Uruguay	28

=== Semifinals ===
April 16; 17:00	Uruguay	36 – 40	Dominican Republic	Ginásio de Esportes Multieventos Hamilton Linhares, Balneário Camboriú

April 16; 19:00	Brazil	32 – 23	Argentina	Ginásio de Esportes Multieventos Hamilton Linhares, Balneário Camboriú

=== Bronze medal match ===
April 17; 17:00	Argentina	31 – 28	Uruguay	Ginásio de Esportes Multieventos Hamilton Linhares, Balneário Camboriú

=== Gold medal match ===
April 17; 19:00	Brazil	24 – 23	Dominican Republic	Ginásio de Esportes Multieventos Hamilton Linhares, Balneário Camboriú
April 17; 19:00		(10-6)		Ginásio de Esportes Multieventos Hamilton Linhares, Balneário Camboriú

== Final standing ==
Rank	Team
Gold medal	Brazil
Silver medal	Dominican Republic
Bronze medal	Argentina
4	Uruguay
5	Mexico
6	Puerto Rico
7	Paraguay
8	Chile

Team advanced to the 2010 World Youth Women's Handball Championship
