= Chilean Handball Federation =

Governing body of handball in Chile

Chilean Handball Federation Spanish: Federación Chilena de Balonmano CHF
- IOC nation: Republic of Chile
- Sport: Handball
- Other sports: Beach handball

HISTORY
- Year of formation: 1980; 46 years ago

AFFILIATIONS
- International federation: International Handball Federation (IHF)
- IHF member since: 1980
- Continental association: Pan-American Team Handball Federation (PATHF)
- National Olympic Committee: Chilean Olympic Committee

GOVERNING BODY
- President: Juan Pablo Montes Mery (Chile)

HEADQUARTERS
- Address: Ramon Cruz 1176, Office 505 Nunoa Commune Region Metropolitana, Santiago
- Country: Chile
- Secretary General: Patricio Bravo Guajardo (Chile)

FINANCE
- Sponsors: Select Sport Betwarrior

The Chilean Handball Federation (CHF) (Spanish: Federación Chilena de Balonmano) is the governing body of handball and beach handball in the Republic of Chile. Founded in 1980, CHF is affiliated to the International Handball Federation and the Pan-American Team Handball Federation. CHF is also affiliated to the Chilean Olympic Committee. It is based in Santiago.

== National teams ==
- Chile men's national handball team
- Chile women's national handball team
- Chile men's national junior handball team
- Chile women's national junior handball team
- Chile men's national youth handball team
- Chile women's national youth handball team

== Competitions hosted ==
=== International ===
Not yet

=== Continental ===
- 2001 Pan American Men's Youth Handball Championship
- 2002 Pan American Men's Junior Handball Championship
- 2004 Pan American Men's Handball Championship
- 2007 Pan American Men's Junior Handball Championship
- 2009 Pan American Women's Handball Championship
- 2010 Pan American Men's Handball Championship
- 2012 Pan American Women's Youth Handball Championship
- 2016 Pan American Women's Youth Handball Championship
- 2016 Pan American Women's Club Handball Championship
- 2017 Pan American Men's Youth Handball Championship
