= Lori Ogren =

American handball player

Personal information
- Full name: Lori Lynn Ogren
- Nationality: United States
- Born: Port Wing, Wisconsin

Sport
- Sport: Handball
National team
- Years: Team
- 1984, 1988-1992: United States
Medal record
Pan American Women's Handball Championship
Silver medal – second place	1989 United States
- Basketball career

Career information
- High school: South Shore High School (Wisconsin)
- College: University of Minnesota Duluth
- Position: Forward

Career history

Coaching
- Los Amigos High School

Lori Lynn Ogren is an American former handball player who competed in the 1992 Summer Olympics.

== College ==
She played volleyball, softball and basketball for the University of Minnesota Duluth. She was introduced in the UMD Athletic Hall of Fame in 2001.
