= Leonardo Puñales =

Uruguayan handball coach

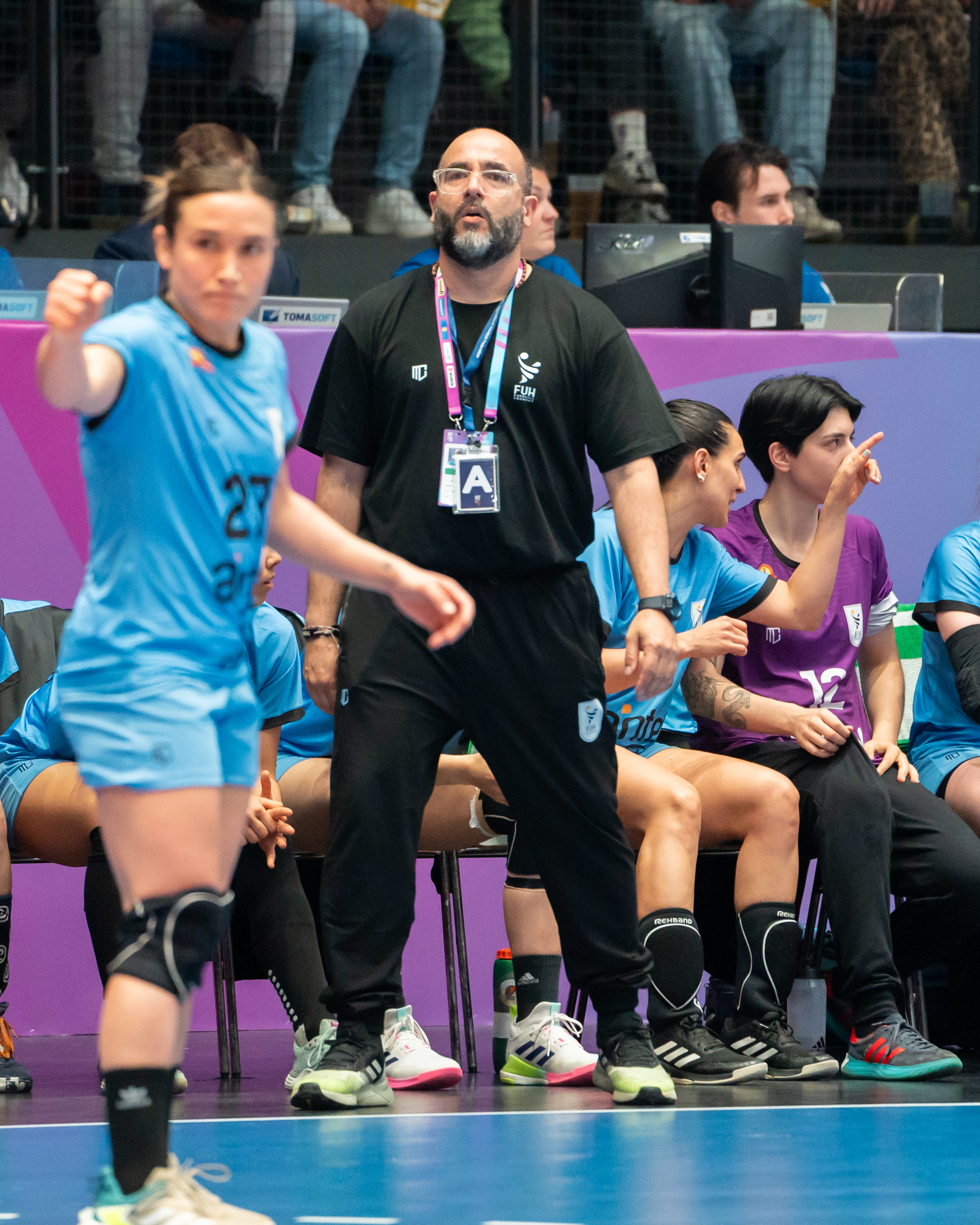
Leonardo Puñales Bonilla 2025

Leonardo Puñales Bonilla, commonly known as Leonardo Puñales is a Uruguayan handball coach of the Uruguay women's national handball team.

He participated at the 2011 World Women's Handball Championship in Brazil and at 2011 Pan American Games in Mexico.
