= 2017 Women's International Tournament of Spain =

Tournament details
- Host country: Spain
- Venue(s): 1 (in 1 host city)
- Dates: 24–26 November
- Teams: 4 (from 3 confederations)

Final positions
- Champions: Spain
- Runners-up: Ukraine
- Third place: Argentina
- Fourth place: Japan

Tournament statistics
- Matches played: 6
- Goals scored: 294 (49 per match)
- Top scorer(s): (Spain) Alexandrina Barbosa

The 2017 Women's International Tournament of Spain was the 21st edition of the Women's International Tournament Of Spain, held in Melilla, Spain between 24–26 November as a friendly handball tournament organised by the Royal Spanish Handball Federation as a preparation of the host nation to the 2017 World Women's Handball Championship.

== Results ==
| Team | Pld | W | D | L | GF | GA | GD | Pts |
|---|---|---|---|---|---|---|---|---|
| Spain | 3 | 3 | 0 | 0 | 87 | 55 | 32 | 6 |
| Ukraine | 3 | 2 | 0 | 1 | 70 | 82 | –12 | 4 |
| Argentina | 3 | 1 | 0 | 2 | 70 | 80 | –10 | 2 |
| Japan | 3 | 0 | 0 | 3 | 67 | 77 | –10 | 0 |

== Round robin ==
All times are local (UTC+1).

| November 24; 19:00 | Japan | 24–25 | Ukraine | Pabellón Javier Imbroda Ortiz, Melilla |
| November 24; 19:00 | | (12–12) | | Pabellón Javier Imbroda Ortiz, Melilla |

| November 24; 21:00 | Spain | 28–19 | Argentina | Pabellón Javier Imbroda Ortiz, Melilla |
| November 24; 21:00 | | (14–8) | | Pabellón Javier Imbroda Ortiz, Melilla |

| November 25; 19:00 | Ukraine | 31–25 | Argentina | Pabellón Javier Imbroda Ortiz, Melilla |
| November 25; 19:00 | | (14–15) | | Pabellón Javier Imbroda Ortiz, Melilla |

| November 25; 21:00 | Spain | 26–22 | Japan | Pabellón Javier Imbroda Ortiz, Melilla |
| November 25; 21:00 | | (14–11) | | Pabellón Javier Imbroda Ortiz, Melilla |

| November 26; 17:00 | Argentina | 26–21 | Japan | Pabellón Javier Imbroda Ortiz, Melilla |
| November 26; 17:00 | | (16–11) | | Pabellón Javier Imbroda Ortiz, Melilla |

| November 26; 19:00 | Spain | 33–14 | Ukraine | Pabellón Javier Imbroda Ortiz, Melilla |
| November 26; 19:00 | | (14–9) | | Pabellón Javier Imbroda Ortiz, Melilla |

== Final standing ==
| Rank | Team |
|---|---|
| Gold medal | Spain |
| 2 | Ukraine |
| 3 | Argentina |
| 4 | Japan |
