= Mansion Passos Oliveira =

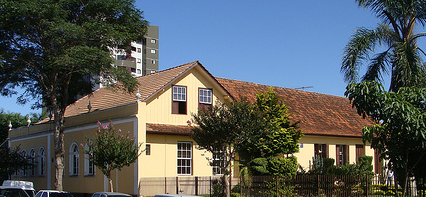
Historic house with its neoclassical facade Italian

The Mansion Passos Oliveira was a historic building in the city of São José dos Pinhais, Brazilian state of Paraná.

The building was demolished in June 2011 and was the last copy of neoclassical Italian in the city. The building was built in 1876.
