= Joana Bolling =

Argentine handball player

Personal information
- Nationality: Argentine
- Born: 6 April 1995 (age 31) Concepción del Uruguay, Argentina
- Height: 1.69 m (5 ft 7 in)

Sport
- Sport: Handball
- Position: Left wing
- Current club: Aula Cultural
- Number: 20

Senior clubs
- Years: Team
- –2018: Vilo handball
- 2018–2020: Aula Cultural
- 2020–2021: Elche Mustang
- 2021–2024: Saint-Amand Handball
- 2024–: CBF Elda
National team
Years	Team	Apps	(Gls)
–	Argentina	37	(53)
Medal record
South and Central American Championship
Silver medal – second place	2022 Argentina
- Updated on 2 November 2025

Joana Bolling (born 6 April 1995) is an Argentine handball player who plays as a left wing for Spanish club Elche Mustang and the Argentina women's national team.

She was selected to represent Argentina at the 2019 World Women's Handball Championship.

Bolling has grown up in La Punta, San Luis Province. In 2016, she donated one of her kidneys to her father, former basketball player Elnes Bolling, who is originally from the United States Virgin Islands and has developed most of his playing career in Argentina. Her mother is of Italian descent.
