= 1986 Pan American Women's Handball Championship =

Tournament details
- Host country: Brazil
- Venue(s): 1 (in 1 host city)
- Dates: 20–25 August 1985
- Teams: 6 (from 1 confederation)

Final positions
- Champions: United States (1st title)
- Runner-up: Canada
- Third place: Brazil
- Fourth place: Argentina

Tournament statistics
- Matches played: 15
- Goals scored: 595 (39.67 per match)

The 1986 Pan American Women's Handball Championship was the first edition of the Pan American Women's Handball Championship, held in Brazil from 20 to 25 August 1985. It acted as the American qualifying tournament for the 1986 World Women's Handball Championship.

== Standings ==
| Pos | Team | Pld | W | D | L | GF | GA | GD | Pts | Qualification |
|---|---|---|---|---|---|---|---|---|---|---|
| 1st place, gold medalist(s) | United States | 5 | 5 | 0 | 0 | 168 | 60 | +108 | 10 | 1986 World Championship |
| 2nd place, silver medalist(s) | Canada | 5 | 4 | 0 | 1 | 159 | 70 | +89 | 8 | |
| 3rd place, bronze medalist(s) | Brazil (H) | 5 | 3 | 0 | 2 | 109 | 79 | +30 | 6 | |
| 4 | Argentina | 5 | 2 | 0 | 3 | 52 | 105 | −53 | 4 | |
| 5 | Paraguay | 5 | 1 | 0 | 4 | 70 | 142 | −72 | 2 | |
| 6 | Uruguay | 5 | 0 | 0 | 5 | 37 | 139 | −102 | 0 | |

Source: Todor66
Rules for classification: 1) points; 2) head-to-head points; 3) head-to-head goal difference; 4) head-to-head number of goals scored; 5) goal difference.
(H) Hosts

== Results ==
Results are:

| Canada | 43-9 | Paraguay |

| Brazil | 29-7 | Uruguay |

| 20 August 1986 | United States | 35–6 | Argentina |

| 20 August 1986 | Canada | 37–6 | Uruguay |

| 20 August 1986 | Brazil | 27–17 | Paraguay |

| 21 August 1986 | Canada | 33–9 | Argentina |

| 21 August 1986 | United States | 26–17 | Brazil |

| 22 August 1986 | United States | 31-6 | Uruguay |

| 22 August 1986 | Canada | 24–18 | Brazil |

| 22 August 1986 | Argentina | 14–11 | Paraguay |

| 24 August 1986 | United States | 48–9 | Paraguay |

| 24 August 1986 | Argentina | 18-8 | Uruguay |

| 25 August 1986 | Paraguay | 24-10 | Uruguay |

| 25 August 1986 | United States | 28-22 or 28-21 | Canada |

| 25 August 1986 | Brazil | 18-5 | Argentina |
