= 2000 Pan American Women's Handball Championship =

Tournament details
- Host country: Brazil
- Venue: 1 (in 1 host city)
- Dates: 31 October – 5 November
- Teams: 6 (from 1 confederation)

Final positions
- Champions: Brazil (3rd title)
- Runners-up: Uruguay
- Third place: Greenland
- Fourth place: Argentina

Tournament statistics
- Matches played: 15
- Goals scored: 733 (48.87 per match)

The 2000 Pan American Women's Handball Championship was the sixth edition of the Pan American Women's Handball Championship, held in Brazil from 31 October to 5 November 2000. It acted as the American qualifying tournament for the 2001 World Women's Handball Championship.

== Standings ==
Team	Pld	W	D	L	GF	GA	GD	Pts
Brazil (H)	5	5	0	0	210	81	+129	10
Uruguay	5	2	2	1	108	118	−10	6
Greenland	5	3	0	2	123	120	+3	6
Argentina	5	2	1	2	119	117	+2	5
Mexico	5	1	1	3	110	149	−39	3
Colombia	5	0	0	5	63	148	−85	0

(H) Hosts

== Results ==
All times are local (UTC−3).

31 October 2000; 17:00	Uruguay	21–21	Mexico
31 October 2000; 17:00		(12–12)

31 October 2000; 19:30	Brazil	42–20	Greenland	Constâncio Vieira, Aracaju; Referees: Adjemian, Gotz (ARG)
31 October 2000; 19:30	Silva (6)	(20–9)	3 players (each 4)	Constâncio Vieira, Aracaju; Referees: Adjemian, Gotz (ARG)

31 October 2000; 20:30	Argentina	28–13	Colombia

1 November 2000; 17:00	Uruguay	27–12	Colombia
1 November 2000; 17:00		(17–4)

1 November 2000; 19:00	Brazil	50–19	Mexico
1 November 2000; 19:00		(26–10)

1 November 2000; 21:00	Greenland	20–17	Argentina	Constâncio Vieira, Aracaju; Referees: Carter, Vanasse (CAN)
1 November 2000; 21:00	Grødem (5)	(11–10)	Seif (8)	Constâncio Vieira, Aracaju; Referees: Carter, Vanasse (CAN)

2 November 2000; 17:00	Argentina	22–22	Uruguay

2 November 2000; 19:00	Brazil	38–11	Colombia
2 November 2000; 19:00		(23–5)

2 November 2000; 21:00	Greenland	27–26	Mexico	Constâncio Vieira, Aracaju; Referees: Massberg, Kekes (USA)
2 November 2000; 21:00	Kyed (7)	(15–11)	Garduño & Solis (each 9)	Constâncio Vieira, Aracaju; Referees: Massberg, Kekes (USA)

4 November 2000; 16:00	Argentina	32–20	Mexico
4 November 2000; 16:00		(17–10)

4 November 2000; 18:00	Greenland	31–8	Colombia	Constâncio Vieira, Aracaju; Referees: Adjemian, Gotz (ARG)
4 November 2000; 18:00	Kyed (6)	(19–1)	Martinez & Peña (each 2)	Constâncio Vieira, Aracaju; Referees: Adjemian, Gotz (ARG)

4 November 2000; 20:00	Brazil	38–11	Uruguay
4 November 2000; 20:00		(20–6)

5 November 2000; 10:30	Mexico	24–19	Colombia
5 November 2000; 10:30		(10–10)

5 November 2000; 12:30	Uruguay	27–25	Greenland	Constâncio Vieira, Aracaju; Referees: Silva, Righeto (BRA)
5 November 2000; 12:30	del Campo (7)	(15–13)	Jensen (7)	Constâncio Vieira, Aracaju; Referees: Silva, Righeto (BRA)

5 November 2000; 14:30	Brazil	42–20	Argentina
5 November 2000; 14:30		(17–8)

Games of Greenland

== Final ranking ==
Qualified for the 2001 World Championship

Rank	Team
Gold medal	Brazil
Silver medal	Uruguay
Bronze medal	Greenland
4	Argentina
5	Mexico
6	Colombia
