= 2016 Women's International Tournament of Spain =

- official poster

Tournament details
- Host country: Spain
- Venue(s): 1 (in 1 host city)
- Dates: 25–27 November
- Teams: 4 (from 3 confederations)

Final positions
- Champions: Spain
- Runner-up: Poland
- Third place: Japan
- Fourth place: Argentina

Tournament statistics
- Matches played: 6
- Goals scored: 294 (49 per match)
- Top scorer(s): (Poland) Marta Gega (12 goals)

The 2016 Women's International Tournament of Spain was the 20th edition of the Women's International Tournament Of Spain, held in Elda, Spain between 25–27 November as a friendly handball tournament organised by the Royal Spanish Handball Federation as a preparation of the host nation to the 2016 European Women's Handball Championship.

== Results ==
Team	Pld	W	D	L	GF	GA	GD	Pts
Spain	3	3	0	0	90	54	+36	6
Poland	3	2	0	1	81	67	+14	4
Japan	3	1	0	2	61	84	–23	2
Argentina	3	0	0	3	62	89	–27	0

== Round robin ==
All times are local (UTC+1).

November 25; 18:30	Poland	32–17	Japan	Polideportivo Florentino Ibáñes, Elda
November 25; 18:30	Gega 5	(16–12)	Tada 6	Polideportivo Florentino Ibáñes, Elda

November 25; 20:30	Spain	35–15	Argentina	Polideportivo Florentino Ibáñes, Elda
November 25; 20:30	Barbosa 6	(17–8)	five players 2	Polideportivo Florentino Ibáñes, Elda

November 26; 18:15	Argentina	28–31	Poland	Polideportivo Florentino Ibáñes, Elda
November 26; 18:15	Urban 6	(11–18)	Szcecina 5	Polideportivo Florentino Ibáñes, Elda

November 26; 20:15	Spain	33–21	Japan	Polideportivo Florentino Ibáñes, Elda
November 26; 20:15	González 5	(17–11)	Yokoshima 7	Polideportivo Florentino Ibáñes, Elda

November 27; 10:30	Japan	23–19	Argentina	Polideportivo Florentino Ibáñes, Elda
November 27; 10:30	Fujita 7	(13–10)	Pizzo 6	Polideportivo Florentino Ibáñes, Elda

November 27; 12:00	Spain	22–18	Poland	Polideportivo Florentino Ibáñes, Elda
November 27; 12:00	Mangué 4	(8–11)	Gega 5	Polideportivo Florentino Ibáñes, Elda

== Final standing ==
Rank	Team
Gold medal	Spain
2	Poland
3	Japan
4	Argentina
