= 2007 Pan American Women's Handball Championship =

2007 Pan American Handball Women's Championships
Tournament details
- Host country: Dominican Republic
- Venue(s): 1 (in 1 host city)
- Dates: 31 May – 4 June
- Teams: 8 (from 1 confederation)

Final positions
- Champions: Brazil (6th title)
- Runner-up: Argentina
- Third place: Dominican Republic
- Fourth place: Paraguay

Tournament statistics
- Matches played: 20
- Goals scored: 927 (46.35 per match)

The 2007 Pan American Women's Handball Championship was the ninth edition of the Pan American Women's Handball Championship, which took place in Santo Domingo from 31 May to 4 June 2007. It acted as the American qualifying tournament for the 2007 World Women's Handball Championship.

== Participating teams ==
- Argentina
- Brazil
- Canada
- Dominican Republic
- Mexico
- Paraguay
- United States
- Uruguay

== Teams ==
| Group A | Group B |
|---|---|
| Argentina; Dominican Republic; Mexico; Uruguay | Brazil; Canada; Paraguay; United States |

== Preliminary round ==
All times are local (UTC−4).

=== Group A ===
| Team | Pld | W | D | L | GF | GA | GD | Pts |
|---|---|---|---|---|---|---|---|---|
| Argentina | 3 | 2 | 0 | 1 | 65 | 57 | +8 | 4 |
| Dominican Republic (H) | 3 | 2 | 0 | 1 | 75 | 71 | +4 | 4 |
| Uruguay | 3 | 1 | 1 | 1 | 69 | 66 | +3 | 3 |
| Mexico | 3 | 0 | 1 | 2 | 55 | 70 | −15 | 1 |

(H) Hosts

| 31 May 2007; 16:00 | Argentina | 20–12 | Mexico | Santo Domingo |
| 31 May 2007; 16:00 | | (10–7) | | Santo Domingo |

| 31 May 2007; 20:00 | Dominican Republic | 25–24 | Uruguay | Santo Domingo |
| 31 May 2007; 20:00 | | (13–11) | | Santo Domingo |

| 1 June 2007; 16:00 | Uruguay | 24–24 | Mexico | Santo Domingo |
| 1 June 2007; 16:00 | | (11–11) | | Santo Domingo |

| 1 June 2007; 20:00 | Argentina | 28–24 | Dominican Republic | Santo Domingo |
| 1 June 2007; 20:00 | | (11–13) | | Santo Domingo |

| 2 June 2007; 16:00 | Uruguay | 21–17 | Argentina | Santo Domingo |
| 2 June 2007; 16:00 | | (11–10) | | Santo Domingo |

| 2 June 2007; 20:00 | Dominican Republic | 26–19 | Mexico | Santo Domingo |
| 2 June 2007; 20:00 | | (10–8) | | Santo Domingo |

=== Group B ===
| Team | Pld | W | D | L | GF | GA | GD | Pts |
|---|---|---|---|---|---|---|---|---|
| Brazil | 3 | 3 | 0 | 0 | 124 | 40 | +84 | 6 |
| Paraguay | 3 | 1 | 1 | 1 | 58 | 88 | −30 | 3 |
| Canada | 3 | 1 | 0 | 2 | 66 | 89 | −23 | 2 |
| United States | 3 | 0 | 1 | 2 | 63 | 94 | −31 | 1 |

| 31 May 2007; 14:00 | Canada | 31–29 | United States | Santo Domingo |
| 31 May 2007; 14:00 | | (15–13) | | Santo Domingo |

| 31 May 2007; 18:00 | Brazil | 47–12 | Paraguay | Santo Domingo |
| 31 May 2007; 18:00 | | (24–5) | | Santo Domingo |

| 1 June 2007; 14:00 | Paraguay | 23–18 | Canada | Santo Domingo |
| 1 June 2007; 14:00 | | (8–8) | | Santo Domingo |

| 1 June 2007; 18:00 | Brazil | 40–11 | United States | Santo Domingo |
| 1 June 2007; 18:00 | | (21–8) | | Santo Domingo |

| 2 June 2007; 14:00 | Paraguay | 23–23 | United States | Santo Domingo |
| 2 June 2007; 14:00 | | (13–10) | | Santo Domingo |

| 2 June 2007; 18:00 | Brazil | 37–17 | Canada | Santo Domingo |
| 2 June 2007; 18:00 | | (18–10) | | Santo Domingo |

== Placement 5th–8th ==
| 3 June 2007; 14:00 | Uruguay | 21–16 | United States | Santo Domingo |

| 3 June 2007; 16:00 | Canada | 27–22 | Mexico | Santo Domingo |

=== Seventh place game ===
| 4 June 2007; 13:00 | United States | 29–23 | Mexico | Santo Domingo |

=== Fifth place game ===
| 4 June 2007; 15:00 | Uruguay | 24–12 | Canada | Santo Domingo |

== Final round ==
Semifinal
3 June – Santo Domingo
Brazil | 35
Dominican Republic | 8
3 June – Santo Domingo
Paraguay | 19
Argentina | 26

Final
4 June – Santo Domingo
Brazil | 29
Argentina | 12
Third place
4 June – Santo Domingo
Dominican Republic | 25
Paraguay | 24

=== Semifinals ===
| 3 June 2007; 18:00 | Brazil | 35–8 | Dominican Republic | Santo Domingo |
| 3 June 2007; 18:00 | | (17–4) | | Santo Domingo |

| 3 June 2007; 20:00 | Argentina | 26–19 | Paraguay | Santo Domingo |
| 3 June 2007; 20:00 | | (18–9) | | Santo Domingo |

=== Bronze medal match ===
| 4 June 2007; 17:00 | Dominican Republic | 25–24 | Paraguay | Santo Domingo |
| 4 June 2007; 17:00 | | (10–8) | | Santo Domingo |

=== Gold medal match ===
| 4 June 2007; 19:00 | Brazil | 29–12 | Argentina | Santo Domingo |
| 4 June 2007; 19:00 | | (12–6) | | Santo Domingo |

== Final standing ==
| Rank | Team |
|---|---|
| Gold medal | Brazil |
| Silver medal | Argentina |
| Bronze medal | Dominican Republic |
| 4 | Paraguay |
| 5 | Uruguay |
| 6 | Canada |
| 7 | United States |
| 8 | Mexico |

| Team advanced to the 2007 World Women's Handball Championship |
