= Francisca Parra =

Chilean field hockey player

Personal information
- Full name: Francisca Antonia Parra Hartard
- Born: 6 October 1999 (age 26) Santiago, Chile

Sport
- Sport: Field hockey
- Position: Forward
- Club: Universidad Católica
National team
Years	Team	Caps	Goals
2018–2019	Chile U21	6	(1)
2018–	Chile	32	(3)
Medal record
Women's field hockey
Representing Chile
FIH Hockey Series
Bronze medal – third place	2018–19 Hiroshima	Team
FIH Nations Cup
Bronze medal – third place	2023–24 Terrassa	Team

Francisca Antonia Parra Hartard (born 6 October 1999) is a field hockey player from Chile, who plays as a forward.

== Career ==
=== Under–21 ===
Francisca Parra made her debut for the Chile U–21 team in June 2018, during a test series against Canada in Victoria, B.C.

=== Las Diablas ===
Following her first junior appearance, Parra was called up to the national team in September 2018, competing in the 2018–19 FIH Series Open in Santiago.

Parra continued to represent Las Diablas in 2019, making her first appearance during a test series against Ireland in Santiago. In June, Parra represented Chile at the FIH Series Finals in Hiroshima, winning her first medal at a major tournament, taking home bronze. Later that year she represented the team at the Pan American Games in Lima, and the FIH Olympic Qualifiers in London, failing to qualify for the 2020 Summer Olympics on both occasions.

In 2020, Parra returned to the international fold with appearances in a January test series against Japan in Santiago.

==== International goals ====
Goal	Date	Location	Opponent	Score	Result	Competition	Ref.
1	20 September 2018	Prince of Wales Country Club, Santiago, Chile	Brazil	2–0	10–0	2018–19 FIH Series Open	
2	20 September 2018	Prince of Wales Country Club, Santiago, Chile	Brazil	10–0	10–0	2018–19 FIH Series Open	
3	9 April 2019	Jinchun Athletic Centre, Asan, South Korea	South Korea	1–1	1–1	Test Match	
