= 1989 Pan American Women's Handball Championship =

Second edition of the Pan American Women's Handball Championship

Tournament details
- Host country: United States
- Venue: 1 (in 1 host city)
- Dates: 14–16 September 1989
- Teams: 4 (from 1 confederation)

Final positions
- Champions: Canada (1st title)
- Runners-up: United States
- Third place: Brazil
- Fourth place: Mexico

Tournament statistics
- Matches played: 6
- Goals scored: 236 (39.33 per match)

The 1989 Pan American Women's Handball Championship was the second edition of the Pan American Women's Handball Championship, held in United States from 14 to 16 September 1989. It acted as the American qualifying tournament for the 1990 World Women's Handball Championship.

== Standings ==
Pos	Team	Pld	W	D	L	GF	GA	GD	Pts	Qualification
1st place, gold medalist(s)	Canada	3	2	1	0	79	45	+34	5	1990 World Championship
2nd place, silver medalist(s)	United States (H)	3	2	1	0	71	38	+33	5	
3rd place, bronze medalist(s)	Brazil	3	1	0	2	72	53	+19	2	
4	Mexico	3	0	0	3	14	100	−86	0	

Source: Todor66
Rules for classification: 1) points; 2) head-to-head points; 3) head-to-head goal difference; 4) head-to-head number of goals scored; 5) goal difference.
(H) Hosts

== Results ==
14 September 1989	Canada	35–7	Mexico

14 September 1989	United States	23–17	Brazil

15 September 1989	Canada	26–20	Brazil

15 September 1989	United States	30–3	Mexico

16 September 1989	Brazil	35–4	Mexico

16 September 1989	Canada	18–18	United States
