= Mexico women's national handball team =

Mexico

Information
- Association: Mexican Handball Federation

Colours
1st	2nd

Results

Pan American Championship
- Appearances: 8 (First in 1989)
- Best result: 4th (1989)
- Last updated on Unknown.

Mexico women's national handball team
Medal record

Central American and Caribbean Games
Silver medal – second place	1993 Puerto Rico	
Silver medal – second place	2002 Dominican Republic	Team
Bronze medal – third place	2010 Puerto Rico	Team
Bronze medal – third place	2014 Mexico	Team

Nor.Ca. Handball Championship
Silver medal – second place	2015 Puerto Rico	
Silver medal – second place	2025 Mexico	
Bronze medal – third place	2021 United States	
Bronze medal – third place	2023 Greeland	

The Mexico women's national handball team is the national team of Mexico. It takes part in international handball competitions.

== Results ==
=== Pan American Championship ===
Year	Round	Position	GP	W	D*	L	GS	GA
(United States) 1989	round robin	4th	3	0	0	3	14	100
(Brazil) 1997	round robin	6th	5	0	1	4	57	144
(Brazil) 2000	round robin	5th	5	1	1	3	110	149
(Dominican Republic) 2007	7th place match	8th	5	0	1	4	100	126
(Chile) 2009	5th place match	5th	4	2	0	2	81	94
(Brazil) 2011	7th place match	7th	4	1	0	3	79	115
(Dominican Republic) 2013	5th place match	6th	6	3	0	3	165	166
(Cuba) 2015	7th place match	8th	7	2	1	4	186	198

=== Pan American Games ===
- 2003 – 6th
- 2007 – 5th
- 2011 – 4th

Games	Round	Position	Pld	W	D	L	GF	GA
(Canada) 2015 Toronto	Bronze Medal Match	4th	5	2	0	3	120	162

=== Central American and Caribbean Games ===
Games	Round	Position	Pld	W	D	L	GF	GA
(Colombia) 2018 Barranquilla	Bronze medal game	4th	5	2	0	3	168	140
(El Salvador) 2023 San Salvador	Bronze medal game	4th	5	2	0	3	154	117

=== Nor.Ca. Championship ===
Year	Round	Position	GP	W	D*	L	GS	GA
(Puerto Rico) 2015	Final	2nd	6	3	1	2	156	160
(Mexico) 2019	Group stage	2nd	2	0	0	2	68	74
(United States) 2021	Bronze medal game	3rd	4	2	0	2	104	97
(Greenland) 2023	Bronze medal game	3rd	5	3	0	2	138	131
(Mexico) 2025	Final	2nd	5	3	0	2	119	119

=== Caribbean Handball Cup ===
Year	Round	Position	GP	W	D*	L	GS	GA
(Colombia) 2017	Final	1	6	5	1	0	176	139
