= Canada women's national handball team =

Canada

Information
- Association: Canadian Team Handball Federation
- Coach: Nathalie Brochu

Colours
1st	2nd

Results

Summer Olympics
- Appearances: 1 (First in 1976)
- Best result: 6th (1976)

World Championship
- Appearances: 4 (First in 1978)
- Best result: 10–12th (1978)

Pan American Championship
- Appearances: 8 (First in 1986)
- Best result: 1st (1989)
- Last updated on Unknown.

The Canada women's national handball team is the national team of Canada. It takes part in international handball competitions. It is governed by the Canadian Team Handball Federation.

The team participated in the 1995 World Women's Handball Championship and in the 1997 World Women's Handball Championship.

== Results ==
=== Summer Olympics ===
- 1976 – 6th

=== World Championship ===
- 1978 – 10–12th
- 1990 – 15th
- 1995 – 17–20th
- 1997 – 20th

=== Pan American Championship ===
- 1986 – 2nd
- 1989 – 1st
- 1991 – 2nd
- 1997 – 2nd
- 2003 – 5th
- 2005 – 4th
- 2007 – 6th
- 2013 – 9th

=== Pan American Games ===
- 1987 – 2nd
- 1995 – 2nd
- 1999 – 2nd
- 2007 – 6th
- 2011 – 5th
- 2015 – 7th
- 2019 – 7th

=== NorCa Championship ===
- 2019 – 7th
- 2023 – 2nd
- 2025 – 3rd

== Current squad ==
The squad chosen for the 2019 Pan American Games in Lima, Peru.

Head coach: Nathalie Brochu

No.	Pos.	Name	Date of birth (age)	Height	App.	Goals	Club
1	GK	Camilia Pivin	9 September 2001 (age 24)				(Canada) Drummondville
2	RW	Nassima Benhacine	12 December 1989 (age 36)				(Canada) Granby
3	B	Emily Routhier	29 March 1994 (age 32)				(Canada) Sherbrooke
5	LW	Myriam Laplante	21 February 1991 (age 35)				(Canada) Champlain
9	B	Katya Chan	11 December 1995 (age 30)				(Canada) Edmonton Handball Club
10	B	Myriam Zimmer	1 April 1993 (age 33)				(France) Grand Poitiers
12	GK	Vassilia Gagnon	5 September 1990 (age 35)				(Canada) Champlain
14	LW	Haven Wong	28 January 1997 (age 29)				(Canada) Edmonton Handball Club
15	B	Audrey Marcoux	8 June 1994 (age 32)				(Canada) Sherbrooke
18	B	Catherine Leger	14 December 1995 (age 30)				(France) Grand Poitiers
19	B	Samantha Koosau	27 April 1991 (age 35)				(Canada) Champlain
21	B	Rosali Langlois	21 March 1992 (age 34)				(Canada) Champlain
25	P	Alexandra Pivin	14 July 1998 (age 28)				(France) CSV Haute-Saône
69	B	Yuki Landry	7 September 1998 (age 27)				(Canada) Champlain
