= Chile women's national handball team =

Chile

Information
- Association: Chilean Handball Federation
- Coach: Felipe Barrientos
- Assistant coach: José Tham

Colours
1st	2nd

Results

World Championship
- Appearances: 2 (First in 2009)
- Best result: 23rd (2009)

Pan American Championship
- Appearances: 4 (First in 2009)
- Best result: 3rd (2009)
- Last updated on Unknown.

The Chile women's national handball team is the national team of Chile. It is governed by the Chilean Handball Federation, and takes part in international handball competitions.

The team participated in the 2009 World Women's Handball Championship in China, finishing 23rd.

== Results ==
=== World Championship ===
- 2009 – 23rd
- 2023 – 27th

=== Pan American Championship ===
- 2009 – 3rd
- 2011 – 5th
- 2015 – 9th
- 2017 – 7th

=== South and Central American Championship ===
- 2018 – 4th
- 2021 – 5th
- 2022 –
- 2024 – 5th

=== Central American Championship ===
Year	Round	Position	GP	W	D*	L	GS	GA
(Honduras) 2014	Did not enter							
(Nicaragua) 2016	Did not enter							
(El Salvador) 2021	Did not enter							
(Nicaragua) 2023	round robin	2nd	5	4	0	1	173	110
Total	1/4		5	4	0	1	173	110

=== Pan American Games ===
- 2011 – 5th
- 2015 – 8th
- 2023 – 4th

=== Junior Pan American Games ===
- 2021 – 4th

=== Other Tournaments ===
- 2017 Women's Four Nations Tournament – 3rd
- 2017 Bolivarian Games –
- 2018 South American Games –
- 2019 Pan American Games repechage qualification tournament – 3rd
- 2022 Bolivarian Games –
- 2022 South American Games – 5th

== Current squad ==
Roster for the 2023 World Women's Handball Championship.

Head coach: Felipe Barrientos

No.	Pos.	Name	Date of birth (age)	Height	App.	Goals	Club
4	RB	Constanza Paul	10 December 2005 (age 20)	1.70 m	8	9	(Chile) Club Balonmano Los Ángeles
5	LW	Romina Ramírez	12 October 1998 (age 28)	1.60 m	22	58	(Chile) Club Italiano Balonmano
6	RB	Valeska Lovera	22 September 1998 (age 28)	1.73 m	34	176	(Spain) CD Beti Onak
7	RW	Gabriela Muller	22 April 2003 (age 23)	1.73 m	18	85	(Chile) Ovalle Balonmano
8	CB	Josefa Araya	20 April 2001 (age 25)	1.62 m	27	57	(Chile) Deumayen Balonmano
9	CB	Catalina Gálvez	18 October 2003 (age 23)	1.72 m	5	24	(Chile) Ovalle Balonmano
10	LB	Francisca Parra	11 November 2000 (age 25)	1.66 m	29	54	(Chile) Ovalle Balonmano
14	P	Catalina Moreno	27 September 1999 (age 27)	1.76 m	42	39	(Chile) Club Deportivo Las Leonas
16	P	Alicia Torres	1 June 1993 (age 33)	1.74 m	64	125
17	P	Pía Pacheco	25 May 2000 (age 26)	1.68 m	22	26	(Chile) Deumayen Balonmano
18	CB	María Correa	20 October 1997 (age 29)	1.71 m	43	46	(Chile) Ovalle Balonmano
19	GK	Antonella Piantini	14 April 1992 (age 34)	1.78 m	58	0
22	LW	Maura Álvarez	13 November 1996 (age 29)	1.75 m	49	96	(Chile) Club Deportivo Las Leonas
23	GK	Madeleine Cortez	6 April 2000 (age 26)	1.64 m	22	0	(Chile) Club Handbol Mislata
27	RB	Francisca Zavala	9 November 1996 (age 29)	1.73 m	35	51	(Chile) Club Deportivo Las Leonas
28	LB	Valeria Carrasco	7 April 2003 (age 23)	1.60 m	14	21	(Chile) Club Italiano Balonmano
30	RW	Michaela Bocchieri	30 September 2005 (age 21)	1.68 m	0	0	(Spain) Pozuelo de Calatrava

== Record against other teams at the World Handball Championship ==
National team	Pld	W	D	L	PF	PA	PD
Argentina	1	0	0	1	16	22	−6
Australia	1	1	0	0	32	21	+11
Hungary	1	0	0	1	14	48	−34
Ivory Coast	1	0	0	1	19	28	−9
Japan	1	0	0	1	19	38	−19
Kazakhstan	1	0	0	1	26	32	−6
Norway	1	0	0	1	15	44	−29
Romania	1	0	0	1	17	51	−34
Tunisia	1	0	0	1	16	34	−18
Total	9	1	0	8	142	297	−155

=== World Junior Championship ===
Year	Round	Position	W	D	L	GF	GA	GD
(Romania) 1977	Did not qualify							
(Socialist Federal Republic of Yugoslavia) 1979	Did not qualify							
(Canada) 1981	Did not qualify							
(France) 1983	Did not qualify							
(South Korea) 1985	Did not qualify							
(Denmark) 1987	Did not qualify							
(Nigeria) 1989	Did not qualify							
(France) 1991	Did not qualify							
(Bulgaria) 1993	Did not qualify							
(Brazil) 1995	Did not qualify							
(Ivory Coast) 1997	Did not qualify							
(China) 1999	Did not qualify							
(Hungary) 2001	Did not qualify							
(North Macedonia) 2003	Did not qualify							
(Czech Republic) 2005	Did not qualify							
(North Macedonia) 2008	Did not qualify							
(South Korea) 2010	Did not qualify							
(Czech Republic) 2012	Did not qualify							
(Croatia) 2014	Did not qualify							
(Russia) 2016	Group stage	22nd	1	0	6	158	267	−99
(Hungary) 2018	Group stage	20th	1	0	6	153	200	−47
(Romania) 2020	Qualified							
(Slovenia) 2022
(North Macedonia) 2024
Total			2	0	12	311	467	-146

==== Record against other teams at the World Youth Championship ====
National team	Pld	W	D	L	PF	PA	PD
Angola	1	0	0	1	22	27	−5
China	2	1	0	1	56	54	+2
Iceland	1	0	0	1	22	23	−1
Japan	1	0	0	1	21	39	−18
Kazakhstan	1	1	0	0	35	34	+1
Netherlands	1	0	0	1	25	41	−16
Portugal	1	0	0	1	22	28	−6
Russia	2	0	0	2	29	80	−51
Slovenia	1	0	0	1	20	33	-13
South Korea	1	0	0	1	21	34	-13
Sweden	1	0	0	1	19	41	-22
Tunisia	1	0	0	1	19	33	-14
Total	14	2	0	12	311	467	−146

=== World Youth Championship ===
Year	Round	Position	W	D	L	GF	GA	GD
(Canada) 2006	Did not qualify							
(Slovakia) 2008	Did not qualify							
(Dominican Republic) 2010	Did not qualify							
(Montenegro) 2012	Did not qualify							
(North Macedonia) 2014	Did not qualify							
(Slovakia) 2016	Group stage	22nd	1	0	6	144	245	−101
(Poland) 2018	Group Stage	18th	2	0	5	136	187	−51
(Croatia) 2020	Qualified							
(Georgia (country)) 2022								
Total			3	0	11	280	432	-152

==== Record against other teams at the World Youth Championship ====
National team	Pld	W	D	L	PF	PA	PD
Angola	1	0	0	1	20	33	−13
Croatia	2	0	0	2	34	62	−28
Denmark	1	0	0	1	16	28	−12
(Democratic Republic of the Congo) DR Congo	1	1	0	0	30	21	+9
Egypt	1	1	0	0	23	12	+11
Germany	1	0	0	1	15	41	−26
Japan	1	0	0	1	19	39	−20
Hungary	1	0	0	1	13	42	−29
Montenegro	1	0	0	1	16	30	−14
Paraguay	1	0	0	1	23	27	−4
Russia	1	0	0	1	23	43	−20
Slovakia	1	1	0	0	29	23	+6
Sweden	1	0	0	1	19	31	−12
Total	14	3	0	11	280	432	−152
