= Uruguay women's national handball team =

Uruguay

Information
- Nickname: La Celeste (The Sky Blue [One]), Los Charrúas
- Association: Federacion Uruguaya de Handball
- Coach: Leonardo Puñales
- Captain: Ignacio Cabrera

Colours
1st	2nd

Results

World Championship
- Appearances: 6 (First in 1997)
- Best result: 20th (2011)

Pan American Championship
- Appearances: 13 (First in 1986)
- Best result: 2nd (2000)
- Last updated on Unknown.

The Uruguay women's national handball team is the national team of Uruguay. It takes part in international handball competitions.

== History ==
The team participated in the 1997, 2001, 2003, 2005, 2011 and 2025 editions of the World Championship. At the 2011 edition they won their first ever World Cup match. At the 2025 edition they won their second.

In 2003 and 2015 they won the bronze medal at the Pan American Games.

== Results ==
=== World Championship ===
Year	Round	Position	GP	W	D*	L	GS	GA
(Germany) 1997	preliminary round	24rd	5	0	0	5	74	163
(Italy) 2001	preliminary round	23rd	5	0	0	5	90	155
(Croatia) 2003	preliminary round	24rd	5	0	0	5	77	211
(Russia) 2005	preliminary round	23rd	5	0	0	5	73	205
(Brazil) 2011	president's cup	20th	7	1	0	6	121	224
(Germany) (Netherlands) 2025	president's cup	29rd	7	2	0	5	155	202
Total	6/28		34	3	0	31	590	1160

=== Pan American Games ===
Games	Round	Position	Pld	W	D	L	GF	GA
(Canada) 1999 Winnipeg	placement round	6th	4	1	0	3	68	112
(Dominican Republic) 2003 Santo Domingo	Bronze Medal Match	4th	5	2	0	3	113	147
(Mexico) 2011 Guadalajara	7th place match	7th	5	2	1	2	135	146
(Canada) 2015 Toronto	Bronze Medal Match	3rd	5	3	0	2	131	135
(Chile) 2023 Santiago	7th place match	7th	5	2	0	3	98	124
Total	5/9		24	10	1	13	545	664

=== Pan American Championship ===
Year	Round	Position	GP	W	D*	L	GS	GA
(Brazil) 1986	round robin	6th	5	0	0	5	37	139
(Brazil) 1991	5th place game	6th	4	1	0	3	45	84
(Brazil) 1997	3rd place game	3rd	6	4	0	2	122	95
(Argentina) 1999	round robin	4th	5	2	0	3	114	86
(Brazil) 2000	round robin	2nd	5	2	2	1	108	118
(Brazil) 2003	3rd place match	3rd	4	2	0	2	75	95
(Brazil) 2005	round robin	3rd	5	3	0	2	118	139
(Dominican Republic) 2007	5th place match	5th	5	3	1	1	114	94
(Chile) 2009	5th place match	6th	4	1	2	1	93	97
(Brazil) 2011	3rd place match	4th	5	1	1	3	118	145
(Dominican Republic) 2013	5th place match	5th	6	4	0	2	166	153
(Cuba) 2015	5th place match	5th	7	4	1	2	197	200
(Argentina) 2017	3rd place match	4th	6	3	0	3	159	128

=== South and Central American Championship ===
Year	Round	Position	GP	W	D*	L	GS	GA
(Brazil) 2018	Round robin	5th	4	1	0	3	80	109
(Paraguay) 2021	Round robin	4th	5	1	2	2	145	128
(Argentina) 2022	Round robin	4th	4	1	0	3	87	111
(Brazil) 2024	Round robin	3rd	5	3	0	2	139	110
Total	4/4		18	6	2	10	451	458

=== South American Games ===
Games	Round	Position	Pld	W	D	L	GF	GA
(Colombia) 2010 Medellin	Round robin	3rd	5	3	0	2	130	128
(Chile) 2014 Santiago	Round robin	4th	4	1	0	3	85	123
(Bolivia) 2018 Cochabamba	Consolation robin	5th	4	2	0	2	128	67
(Paraguay) 2022 Asunción	Round robin	4th	5	2	0	3	134	102

=== Other Tournaments ===
Olympic qualification tournament
Tournament	Outcome	Position	Pld	W	D	L	GF	GA
(Denmark) 2016	not qualified	4th	3	0	0	3	55	108

- 2016 Women's Four Nations Tournament – 3rd
- 2023 Pan American Games last chance qualification tournament –

== Current squad ==
Roster for the 2025 World Women's Handball Championship.

Head coach: Leonardo Puñales

No.	Pos.	Name	Date of birth (age)	Height	App.	Goals	Club
2	P	Julieta Pessina	19 September 1999 (age 26)	1.69 m	40	15	(Uruguay) Layva Balonmano
3	LB	Sabrina Grieco	12 May 1999 (age 26)	1.73 m	60	200	(Uruguay) Club Atlético Goes
4	CB	Martina Barreiro	24 October 1996 (age 29)	1.65 m	102	452	(Uruguay) Club Atlético Goes
5	RB	Camila Barreiro	29 January 1994 (age 32)	1.60 m	28	54	(Uruguay) Club Atlético Goes
6	LW	Leticia Schinca	12 April 1990 (age 35)	1.69 m	60	180	(Uruguay) Club Nautico
7	RW	Catalina Tournier	4 December 2001 (age 24)	1.63 m	120	90	(Uruguay) Colegio Alemán
8	LB	Camila Bianco	9 March 1998 (age 27)	1.76 m	40	60	(Uruguay) Layva Balonmano
9	P	Rosina González	22 June 1993 (age 32)	1.73 m	40	55	(Uruguay) Layva Balonmano
10	P	Viviana Ferrari	25 March 1992 (age 33)	1.71 m	190	450	(Uruguay) Club Atlético Goes
12	GK	Viviana Hergatacorzian	3 August 2001 (age 24)	1.78 m	25	1	(Uruguay) Club Atlético Goes
13	CB	Maite Pessina	4 December 2001 (age 24)	1.71 m	20	25	(Uruguay) Layva Balonmano
18	RB	Sabrina Golda	31 May 2003 (age 22)	1.64 m	40	100	(Uruguay) Club Nautico
19	RB	Magdalena Guichon	12 May 2004 (age 21)	1.69 m	30	60	(Uruguay) Scuola Italiana Di Montevideo
22	GK	Agustina Modernell	22 October 1995 (age 30)	1.74 m	94	1	(Uruguay) Layva Balonmano
24	LB	Martina Campos	25 December 2005 (age 20)	1.67 m	32	130	(Uruguay) Sesi Araraquara
27	CB	Paula Eastman	5 May 1997 (age 28)	1.57 m	70	150	(Uruguay) Layva Balonmano
