= Argentina women's national handball team =

Argentina

Information
- Nickname: La Garra
- Association: Confederación Argentina de Handball
- Coach: Mariano Muñoz
- Assistant coach: Martin Duhau

Colours
1st	2nd

Results

Summer Olympics
- Appearances: 1 (First in 2016)
- Best result: 12th (2016)

World Championship
- Appearances: 13 (First in 1999)
- Best result: 16th (2019)

Pan American Championship
- Appearances: 13 (First in 1986)
- Best result: 1st (2009)
- Last updated on Unknown.

Argentina women's national handball team
Medal record

Pan American Championship
Gold medal – first place	2009 Chile	
Silver medal – second place	2003 Brazil	
Silver medal – second place	2005 Brazil	
Silver medal – second place	2007 Dominican Republic	
Silver medal – second place	2011 Brazil	
Silver medal – second place	2013 Dominican Republic	
Silver medal – second place	2017 Argentina	
Bronze medal – third place	1999 Argentina	
Bronze medal – third place	2015 Cuba	

Pan American Games
Silver medal – second place	2003 Dominican Republic	Team
Silver medal – second place	2011 Mexico	Team
Silver medal – second place	2015 Canada	Team
Bronze medal – third place	2007 Brazil	Team

The Argentina women's national handball team is the national team of Argentina. It is governed by the Confederacion Argentina de Handball and takes part in international handball competitions.

== Results ==
=== Olympic Games ===
Games	Round	Position	Pld	W	D	L	GF	GA
(Canada) 1976 Montreal	did not qualify							
(Soviet Union) 1980 Moscow	did not qualify							
(United States) 1984 Los Angeles	did not qualify							
(South Korea) 1988 Seoul	did not qualify							
(Spain) 1992 Barcelona	did not qualify							
(United States) 1996 Atlanta	did not qualify							
(Australia) 2000 Sydney	did not qualify							
(Greece) 2004 Athens	did not qualify							
(China) 2008 Beijing	did not qualify							
(United Kingdom) 2012 London	did not qualify							
(Brazil) 2016 Rio de Janeiro	Group stage	12th of 12	5	0	0	5	101	145
(Japan) 2020 Tokyo	did not qualify							
(France) 2024 Paris	did not qualify							
Total	1/13		5	0	0	5	101	145

=== World Championship ===
Year	Round	Position	GP	W	D*	L	GS	GA
(Socialist Federal Republic of Yugoslavia) 1957	did not qualify							
(Romania) 1962	did not qualify							
(West Germany) 1965	did not qualify							
(Netherlands) 1971	did not qualify							
(Socialist Federal Republic of Yugoslavia) 1973	did not qualify							
(Soviet Union) 1975	did not qualify							
(Czechoslovakia) 1978	did not qualify							
(Hungary) 1982	did not qualify							
(Netherlands) 1986	did not qualify							
(South Korea) 1990	did not qualify							
(Norway) 1993	did not qualify							
(Austria) (Hungary) 1995	did not qualify							
(Germany) 1997	did not qualify							
(Denmark) (Norway) 1999	preliminary round	24th	5	0	0	5	52	180
(Italy) 2001	did not qualify							
(Croatia) 2003	preliminary round	22nd	5	0	0	5	74	171
(Russia) 2005	preliminary round	20th	5	1	0	4	79	150
(France) 2007	President's Cup	20th	6	2	0	4	124	157
(China) 2009	President's Cup	19th	9	3	1	5	192	240
(Brazil) 2011	President's Cup	23rd	7	1	0	6	127	172
(Serbia) 2013	President's Cup	19th	7	2	0	5	154	187
(Denmark) 2015	President's Cup	18th	7	2	0	5	144	169
(Germany) 2017	President's Cup	23rd	7	1	0	6	156	220
(Japan) 2019	President's Cup	16th	7	2	0	5	177	197
(Spain) 2021	main round	21st	6	2	0	4	148	165
(Denmark) (Norway) (Sweden) 2023	main round	20th	6	2	0	4	146	181
(Germany) (Netherlands) 2025	22nd	6	2	0	4	147	149	
(Hungary) 2027	To be determined							
(Spain) 2029	To be determined							
(Czech Republic) (Poland) 2031	To be determined							
Total	13/30		83	20	1	62	1620	2338

=== Pan American Games ===
Games	Round	Position	Pld	W	D	L	GF	GA
(United States) 1987 Indianapolis	preliminary round	5th	4	0	0	4	28	93
(Cuba) 1991 Havana	women's competitions not held							
(Argentina) 1995 Mar del Plata	preliminary round	5th	4	0	0	4	61	90
(Canada) 1999 Winnipeg	preliminary round	6th	6	1	0	5	120	138
(Dominican Republic) 2003 Santo Domingo	gold medal match	2nd	7	4	1	2	170	179
(Brazil) 2007 Rio de Janeiro	bronze medal match	3rd	5	4	0	1	144	109
(Mexico) 2011 Guadalajara	gold medal match	2nd	5	4	0	1	121	111
(Canada) 2015 Toronto	gold medal match	2nd	5	3	0	2	122	101
(Peru) 2019 Lima	gold medal match	2nd	5	4	0	1	157	90
(Chile) 2023 Santiago	gold medal match	2nd	5	4	0	1	151	90
(Peru) 2027 Lima	Qualified							
Total	9/9		46	24	1	21	1074	1004

=== Pan American Championship ===
Year	Round	Position	GP	W	D*	L	GS	GA
(Brazil) 1986	round robin	4th	5	2	0	3	51	106
(United States) 1989	did not enter							
(Brazil) 1991	round robin	4th	4	1	0	3	54	119
(Brazil) 1997	bronze medal match	4th	6	2	0	4	85	100
(Argentina) 1999	round robin	3rd	5	3	1	1	126	96
(Brazil) 2000	round robin	4th	5	2	1	2	119	117
(Brazil) 2003	gold medal match	2nd	4	2	0	2	71	85
(Brazil) 2005	round robin	2nd	5	4	0	1	122	103
(Dominican Republic) 2007	gold medal match	2nd	5	3	0	2	103	105
(Chile) 2009	gold medal match	1st	5	5	0	0	113	74
(Brazil) 2011	gold medal match	2nd	5	3	1	1	159	125
(Dominican Republic) 2013	gold medal match	2nd	6	5	0	1	178	118
(Cuba) 2015	bronze medal match	3rd	7	5	0	2	220	130
(Argentina) 2017	gold medal match	2nd	6	5	0	1	190	116
Total	13/14	1 title	69	42	3	24	1591	1394

=== South and Central American Championship ===
Year	Round	Position	GP	W	D*	L	GS	GA
(Brazil) 2018	Round robin	2nd	4	3	0	1	108	92
(Paraguay) 2021	Round robin	2nd	5	4	0	1	167	78
(Argentina) 2022	Round robin	2nd	4	3	0	1	99	78
(Brazil) 2024	Round robin	2nd	5	4	0	1	165	107
Total	4/4		18	14	0	4	539	355

=== Performance in other tournaments ===
South American Games
Games	Round	Position	Pld	W	D	L	GF	GA
(Brazil) 2002 São Bernardo do Campo	round robin	2nd	4	2	0	2	71	81
(Argentina) 2006 Mar del Plata	gold medal match	1st	5	5	0	0	150	93
(Colombia) 2010 Medellin	round robin	1st	5	5	0	0	171	95
(Chile) 2014 Santiago	round robin	2nd	4	3	1	0	95	72
(Bolivia) 2018 Cochabamba	Final	2nd	5	4	0	1	163	79
(Paraguay) 2022 Asunción	Round robin	3rd	5	3	0	2	136	95
(Argentina) 2026 Rosario	Round robin	1st	5	4	1	0	156	96
Total	6/6	3 Titles	33	26	2	5	942	418

Olympic qualification tournament
Tournament	Outcome	Position	Pld	W	D	L	GF	GA
(Spain) 2012	not qualified	4th	3	0	0	3	57	91
(Spain) 2021	not qualified	3rd	2	0	0	2	34	65
(Spain) 2024	not qualified	4th	3	0	0	3	78	101

- 2016 Women's International Tournament of Spain – 4th
- 2017 Women's International Tournament of Spain – 3rd
- 2019 Baltic Handball Cup – 4th
- 2019 Intersport Cup – 4th

== Current squad ==
Roster for the 2025 World Women's Handball Championship.

Head coach: Mariano Muñoz

No.	Pos.	Name	Date of birth (age)	Height	App.	Goals	Club
1	GK	Marisol Carratú	15 July 1986 (age 40)	1.76 m	153	3	(Spain) CB Elche
3	CB	Martina Romero	18 March 2002 (age 24)	1.71 m	20	20	(Spain) CBF Málaga Costa del Sol
5	RB	Helena Molina	30 October 2006 (age 19)	1.83 m	5	13	(Argentina) Asociación Alemana de Quilmes
6	RW	Ayelén García	13 December 1999 (age 26)	1.67 m	62	103	(Spain) CD Beti Onak
7	P	Rocío Campigli	6 August 1994 (age 32)	1.71 m	215	210	(Spain) CBF Málaga
13	P	Giuliana Gavilan	7 March 1996 (age 30)	1.76 m	83	113	(Spain) BM Bera Bera
17	RB	Malena Cavo	2 April 1999 (age 27)	1.70 m	63	206	(Poland) MKS Zagłębie Lubin
18	CB	Macarena Sans	20 November 1996 (age 29)	1.66 m	109	302	(Spain) CD Beti Onak
20	LW	Joana Bolling	6 April 1995 (age 31)	1.68 m	37	53	(Spain) Club Handbol Mislata
22	LB	Elke Karsten	15 May 1995 (age 31)	1.77 m	124	451	(Spain) BM Bera Bera
23	P	Sol Azcun	24 February 2000 (age 26)	1.82 m	5	4	(Spain) CBF Elda
24	CB	Carolina Bono	14 July 2000 (age 26)	1.67 m	46	25	(Spain) BM Porriño
25	LB	Micaela Casasola	17 March 1997 (age 29)	1.75 m	101	221	(Spain) CD Beti Onak
26	LW	Lucia Dalle	4 December 1998 (age 27)	1.62 m	48	73	(Italy) Handball Erice
27	LB	Martina Lang	7 November 2003 (age 22)	1.72 m	8	10	(Spain) BM Remudas
33	GK	Valentina Menucci	30 December 2000 (age 25)	1.74 m	0	0	(Spain) Club Balonmano Zonzamas
34	RW	Berenice Frelier	6 March 2003 (age 23)	1.70 m	2	0	(Slovakia) IUVENTA Michalovce
