= Ana Paula Belo =

Brazilian handball player (born 1987)

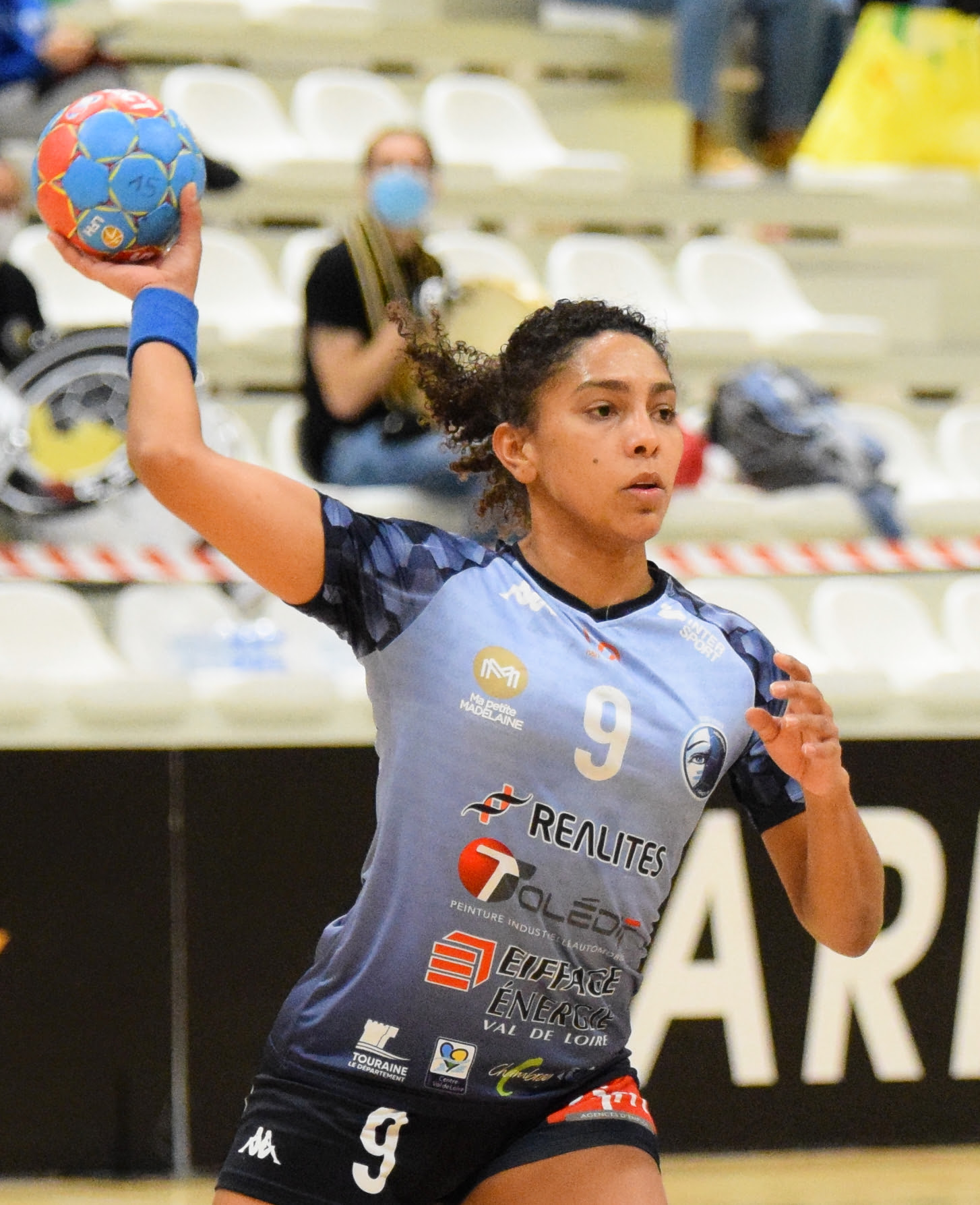
- Rodrigues Belo in 2020.

Personal information
- Full name: Ana Paula Rodrigues Belo
- Born: 18 October 1987 (age 39) São Luís, Brazil
- Height: 1.72 m (5 ft 8 in)

Sport
- Sport: Handball
- Position: Centre back
- Current club: Handball Erice
- Number: 9

Senior clubs
- Years: Team
- –: A.A.G. Maru
- –2007: Guarulhos
- 2007–2008: BM Roquetas de Mar
- 2008–2009: Elche Mustang
- 2009–2011: Elda Prestigio
- 2011–2014: Hypo Niederösterreich
- 2014–2016: CSM București
- 2016–2020: Rostov-Don
- 2020–2021: Chambray
- 2021–2022: HC Dunărea Brăila
- 2022-2023: SCM Craiova
- 2023-2024: Handball Erice
- 2024: Rocasa Gran Canaria
National team
Years	Team	Apps	(Gls)
2005-2024	Brazil	243	(836)
Medal record
World Championship
Gold medal – first place	2013 Serbia
Pan American Games
Gold medal – first place	2011 Guadalajara	Team
Gold medal – first place	2015 Toronto	Team
Gold medal – first place	2019 Lima	Team
Gold medal – first place	2023 Santiago	Team
Pan American Championship
Gold medal – first place	2011 Brazil
Gold medal – first place	2013 Dominican Republic
Gold medal – first place	2017 Argentina
South and Central American Championship
Gold medal – first place	2021 Paraguay
Gold medal – first place	2022 Argentina
South American Games
Gold medal – first place	2022 Asunción	Team
South American Championship
Gold medal – first place	2013 Argentina
- Updated on 16 January 2025

Ana Paula Rodrigues Belo (née Rodrigues; born 18 October 1987) is a Brazilian former handball player. She played for the Brazilian national team. In 2013 she won the World Championship; the first time ever for Brazil and South America.

== Career ==
=== In Brazil ===
Ana Paula Rodrigues Belo began playing handball in 2001. In 2006 she started her professional career at Guarulhos.

=== In Spain ===
In the summer of 2007 she signed a contract with the Spanish team BM Puertodulce Roquetas. One season later she joined Elche Mustang. In the 2008–09 season she scored 246 goals, and was thus a big part of the team's first ever qualification for the EHF European League.

The following season she joined Elda Prestigio. Here she reached the final of the 2010 EHF Cup, where they lost to Danish side Randers HK.

=== In Austria ===
In 2011 she joined Hypo Niederösterreich, which had recently signed a cooperation agreement with the Brazilian Handball Confederation. Here she won the Austrian League and Cup double all three seasons she played at the club.

=== First period in Romania ===
In 2014 she joined Romanian CSM București together with Brazilian teammate Fernanda da Silva. Together with three other Brazilian players she won the Romanian National League in 2015, which was the first in club history.

In her second season at the club she won the league for a second time in 2016, and this time she also won the Romanian cup and the 2016 Champions League, beating Hungarian Gyor in the final.

=== In Russia ===
In 2016 she joined Russian team Rostov-Don. Here she won the 2016-17 EHF Cup. She also won the Russian Super League in both 2017 and 2018.

=== In France ===
In January 2020 she joined French team Chambray Touraine Handball.

=== Second period in Romania ===
After 1.5 seasons in France she joined HC Dunărea Brăila. A season later she joined SCM Craiova.

=== In Italy ===
In the 2023–24 season, she played for Italian team Handball Erice.

=== Return to Spain ===
In 2024 she signed for Rocasa Gran Canaria. Her contract initially ran until 2026, but the club released her already in December 2024 after she was injured.

== National team ==
Ana Paula Rodrigues Belo debuted for the Brazilian national team in 2005. At the 2011 Pan American Games she won gold medals, beating Argentina in the final.

She has represented Brazil at 4 olympics, in 2008, 2012, 2016 and 2020.

She also represented Brazil at 8 World Championships, in 2011, 2013, 2015, 2017, 2019, 2021 and 2023. She won the 2013 edition, where she scored 39 goals.

She also won the Pan American Championship three times, in 2011, 2013 and 2017. In 2013 she was selected for the all star team.

In 2021 she won the 2021 South and Central American Championship. A year later she won the 2022 South American Games, beating the surprise of the tournament, Paraguay in the final.

In 2023 she one another gold medal at the Pan American Games.

== Achievements ==
- EHF Champions League
  - Winner: 2016
- EHF Cup Winners' Cup
  - Winner: 2013
- EHF Cup
  - Winner: 2017
  - Finalist: 2010
- Russian Super League
  - Winner: 2017
- Romanian National League:
  - Winner: 2015, 2016
- Romanian Cup:
  - Finalist: 2015
- Austrian League:
  - Winner: 2012, 2013, 2014
- Austrian Cup:
  - Winner: 2012, 2013, 2014
- Pan American Games:
  - Winner: 2011, 2015
- World Championship:
  - Winner: 2013
- Pan American Championship:
  - Winner: 2011, 2013, 2017
- South American Championship:
  - Winner: 2013
- Provident Cup:
  - Winner: 2013

== Individual awards ==
- All-Star Playmaker of the Pan American Championship: 2013
- Team of the Tournament Centre Back of the Bucharest Trophy: 2014
- Carpathian Trophy Top Scorer: 2015
- International Tournament of Spain Top Scorer: 2014
- 2021 South and Central American Women's Handball Championship: All star team centre back
