= Bárbara Arenhart =

Brazilian handball player (born 1986)

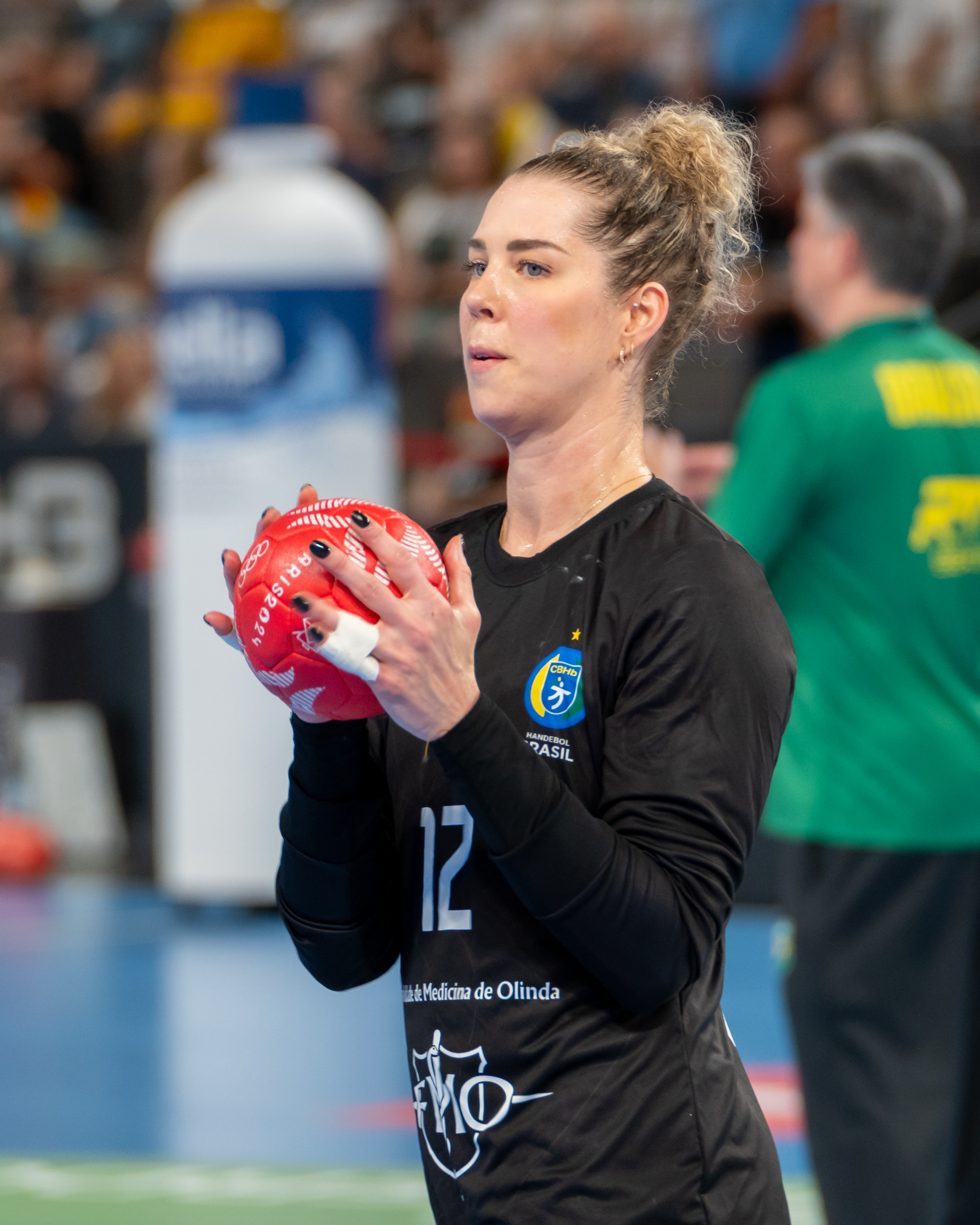

Personal information
- Full name: Bárbara Elisabeth Arenhart
- Nickname: Babi
- Born: 4 October 1986 (age 40) Novo Hamburgo, Brazil
- Height: 1.81 m (5 ft 11 in)

Sport
- Sport: Handball
- Position: Goalkeeper
- Current club: RK Krim
- Number: 12

Senior clubs
- Years: Team
- 1999–2006: Santa/Feevale
- 2007: Metodista/São Bernardo
- 2007–2010: Balonmano Parc Sagunto
- 2010–2011: Byåsen
- 2011–2014: Hypo Niederösterreich
- 2014–2015: HCM Baia Mare
- 2015–2016: Nykøbing Falster HK
- 2016–2020: Váci NKSE
- 2020–2021: ŽRK Budućnost Podgorica
- 2021–2025: RK Krim
- 2025–2026: Mosonmagyaróvári KC SE
National team
Years	Team	Apps	(Gls)
2009-	Brazil	210	(20)
Medal record
World Championship
Gold medal – first place	2013 Serbia
Pan American Games
Gold medal – first place	2011 Guadalajara	Team
Gold medal – first place	2015 Toronto	Team
Gold medal – first place	2019 Lima	Team
Pan American Championship
Gold medal – first place	2011 Brazil
Gold medal – first place	2013 Dominican Republic
Gold medal – first place	2017 Argentina
Silver medal – second place	2009 Chile
South and Central American Championship
Gold medal – first place	2018 Brazil
Gold medal – first place	2022 Argentina
South American Games
Gold medal – first place	2018 Cochabamba	Team
South American Championship
Gold medal – first place	2013 Argentina
- Updated on 21. Juli 2024

Bárbara Elisabeth Arenhart (born 4 October 1986) is a Brazilian female handball goalkeeper for RK Krim and the Brazilian national team. She is the captain of the Brazilian National Team.

She is openly lesbian.

== Career ==
Arenhart started her career at the Brazilian clubs Santa/Feevale and Metodista before heading to Europe in 2007, where she joined Spanish side Balonmano Parc Sagunto. Here, she won the Copa de la Reina in 2008.

In the summer of 2010, she moved to the Norwegian club Byåsen HE, before joining Austrian side Hypo Niederösterreich. Here, she won the Austrian League and Austrian cup three times and EHF Cup Winners' Cup once. She also won the award for Player of the year in Austria in 2013.

In February 2013, she announced that she would leave the club and joined the Romanian top club HCM Baia Mare together with Brazilian colleague Alexandra do Nascimento. Here, she played for a year before joining Danish side NFH.

Two years later, she joined Hungarian side Ipress Center-Vác in 2016, where she played for 4 years. In the 2020/21 season, she joined the Montenegrin side ŽRK Budućnost Podgorica. Here, she played for a single season, where she won both the Montenegrin League and the Montenegrin trophy, before joining Slovenian side RK Krim. Here, she has won the Slovenian Championship in 2022, 2023 and 2024 and the Slovenian Cup in 2022 and 2023.

== Achievements ==
- Austrian League:
  - Winner: 2012, 2013, 2014
- Austrian Cup:
  - Winner: 2012, 2013, 2014
- Norwegian League:
  - Silver Medalist: 2011
- Romanian League:
  - Finalist: 2015
- Romanian Cup:
  - Winner: 2015
- Supercupa României:
  - Winner: 2014
- Spanish Cup:
  - Winner: 2008
- EHF Cup Winners' Cup:
  - Winner: 2013
- Baia Mare Champions Trophy:
  - Winner: 2014
- Pan American Games:
  - Winner: 2011, 2015
- World Championship:
  - Winner: 2013
- Pan American Championship:
  - Winner: 2011, 2013, 2017
  - Silver Medalist: 2009
- South American Championship:
  - Winner: 2013
- Provident Cup:
  - Winner: 2013

== Awards and recognition ==
- All-Star Goalkeeper of the World Championship: 2013
- Austrian Handball Federation Handballer of the Year – Women: 2013
- Austrian Handball Federation Goalkeeper of the Year – Women: 2013
- 2016 Women's Four Nations Tournament: Best Goalkeeper
- All-Star Goalkeeper of the Pan American Championship: 2017
