= Deonise Fachinello =

Brazilian handball player (born 1983)

Personal information
- Full name: Deonise Cavaleiro Fachinello
- Born: 20 June 1983 (age 43) Santa Rosa, Brazil
- Height: 1.80 m (5 ft 11 in)

Sport
- Sport: Handball
- Position: Right back

Senior clubs
- Years: Team
- –: Guarulhos
- –: Metodista
- 2006–2007: Club León Balonmano
- 2007–2008: SD Itxako
- 2008–2009: Hypo Niederösterreich
- 2009–2011: Havre HAC
- 2011–2012: SD Itxako
- 2012–2014: Hypo Niederösterreich
- 2014–2015: CSM București
- 2016: Nykøbing Falster
- 2016–2017: HC Odense
- 2017–2018: CS Măgura Cisnădie
- 2018–2019: SCM Craiova
- 2019–2021: Bourg-de-Péage
- 2022: Debreceni VSC
National team
Years	Team	Apps	(Gls)
–	Brazil	204	(424)
Medal record
World Championship
Gold medal – first place	2013 Serbia
Pan American Games
Gold medal – first place	2007 Rio de Janeiro	Team
Gold medal – first place	2011 Guadalajara	Team
Gold medal – first place	2015 Toronto	Team
Gold medal – first place	2019 Lima	Team
Pan American Championship
Gold medal – first place	2007 Brazil
Gold medal – first place	2011 Brazil
Gold medal – first place	2013 Dominican Republic
Gold medal – first place	2017 Argentina
Silver medal – second place	2009 Chile
South and Central American Championship
Gold medal – first place	2018 Brazil
South American Games
Gold medal – first place	2014 Santiago	Team
Gold medal – first place	2018 Cochabamba	Team
South American Championship
Gold medal – first place	2013 Argentina

Deonise Fachinello (born 20 June 1983) is a former Brazilian handball player. She was a part of the Brazilian national team. In 2013 she won the World Championship; the first time ever for Brazil and South America.

== Career ==
As a youth played Fachinello started as a goalkeeper, but was retrained as a back.

=== Spain, Austria and back to Spain ===
In 2006 she joined Spanish team Club León Balonmano, where she won the Copa ABF. She then signed for league rivals SD Itxako.

In 2008 she signed for austrian club Hypo Niederösterreich, but she had trouble integrating on the team, and returned to SD Itxako already in January 2009, where she played for the rest of the season.

=== France ===
In the summer she joined French side Havre HAC.

=== Third time in Spain ===
After two years in France she returned to Itxaco for a third time, where she won the 2012 Spanish championship.

=== Second period in Austria ===
In the summer of 2012 she returned to Hypo Niederösterreich. Here she won the Austrian League and cup double in both 2012-13 and 2013-14.

=== Romania ===
In 2014 she joined Romanian CSM București. Together with three other Brazilian players she won the Romanian National League in 2015, which was the first in club history.

=== Denmark ===
In 2015 she joined Danish side Nykøbing Falster Håndboldklub. In 2016 she joined league rivals Odense Håndbold.

=== Second period in Romania ===
A season later she returned to Romania and joined CS Măgura Cisnădie. A year later she joined league rivals SCM Craiova.

=== Second period in France ===
In 2019 she joined French side Bourg-de-Péage Drôme Handball, where she played until 2021.

=== Retirement and comeback ===
Afterwards she retired from handball, but in 2021 she started training with the Hungarian team Debreceni VSC, where she later made her comeback. After the 2021-22 season she ultimately retired, and became the sporting director at Debreceni VSC.

== National team ==
Fachinelli was part of the Brazilian team that won gold medals at the 2007, 2011 and 2015 Pan American Championships, and the 2007, 2011, 2015 and 2019 Pan American Games.

She also represented Brazil at the 2008, 2012 and 2016 Olympics.

Her biggest triumph with Brazil was the World Championship.

== Achievements ==
- Romanian National League:
  - Winner: 2015
  - Bronze Medalist: 2018
- Romanian Cup:
  - Finalist: 2015
- Spanish Division:
  - Winner: 2012
  - Runner-up: 2008
- Queen's Cup
  - Winner: 2012
- Spanish Supercup
  - Winner: 2012
- Spanish Cup
  - Winner: 2007
- French Championship:
  - Runner-up: 2010
- French Cup:
  - Runner-up: 2010
- EHF Cup Winners' Cup
  - Winner: 2013
- Austrian League:
  - Winner: 2009, 2013, 2014
- Austrian Cup:
  - Winner: 2009, 2013, 2014
- EHF Cup
  - Runners-up: 2008
- Pan American Games:
  - Winner: 2007, 2011
- World Championship:
  - Winner: 2013
- Pan American Championship:
  - Winner: 2007, 2011, 2013, 2015, 2017
  - Silver Medalist: 2009
- South American Championship:
  - Winner: 2013
