= Fabiana Diniz =

Brazilian handball player (born 1981)

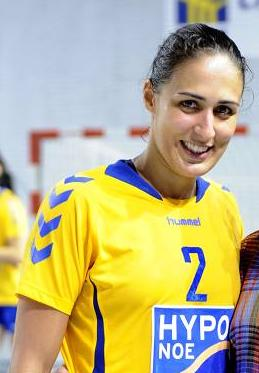

Personal information
- Full name: Fabiana Carvalho Carneiro Diniz
- Born: 13 May 1981 (age 45) Guaratinguetá, Brazil
- Height: 1.83 m (6 ft 0 in)

Sport
- Sport: Handball
- Position: Pivot

Senior clubs
- Years: Team
- –: Guaratinguetá
- –2003: Mauá/São Gonçalo
- 2004–2006: Gil Eanes
- 2006–2008: Club León Balonmano
- 2008–2009: BM Elda Prestigio
- 2009–2010: CB Mar Alicante
- 2010–2012: Bera Bera BM
- 2012–2014: Hypo Niederösterreich
- 2014–2015: Neptunes de Nantes
- 2015–2016: SG BBM Bietigheim
National team
Years	Team	Apps	(Gls)
–	Brazil	211	(349)
Medal record
World Championship
Gold medal – first place	2013 Serbia
Pan American Games
Gold medal – first place	2003 Santo Domingo	Team
Gold medal – first place	2007 Rio de Janeiro	Team
Gold medal – first place	2011 Guadalajara	Team
Pan American Championship
Gold medal – first place	2005 Brazil
Gold medal – first place	2007 Brazil
Gold medal – first place	2011 Brazil
Gold medal – first place	2013 Dominican Republic
Gold medal – first place	2015 Cuba
Silver medal – second place	2009 Chile

Fabiana "Dara" Carvalho Carneiro Diniz (born 13 May 1981) is a retired Brazilian handball player. She played on the Brazilian national team that won the 2013 World Championship, the first time ever Brazil won that title. She also participated at the 2011 World Women's Handball Championship in Brazil and the 2012 Summer Olympics.

== Career ==
Diniz started playing handball at her hometown club. In 2003 she joined Mauá/São Gonçalo. In 2004 she joined Porguguese team Gil Eanes.

In 2006 she joined Spanish side Club León Balonmano. Here she won the 2006 Copa ABF. In 2008 she joined BM Elda Prestigio to replace Begoña Fernández, who had left the club.

In 2009 she joined CB Mar Alicante.

In 2012 she joined Austrian side Hypo NÖ, who had a history of having many brazilian national team players. She joined the team together view national team colleagues Mayara Fier de Moura and Karoline de Souza Here she won the 2013 and 2014 Austrian League and Cup.

In 2014 she joined French side Nantes Loire Atlantique Handball. Here she played until 2015, where she joined German side SG BBM Bietigheim. She retired after a single season at the club.

=== National team ===
With the Brazilian National Team she won the 2005, 2007, 2011 and 2013 Pan American Handball Championships, as well as the 2003, 2007 and 2011 Pan American Games.

She also represented Brazil at the 2004, 2008, 2012 and 2016 Olympics.

Her biggest triumph was in 2013, when Brazil won the World Women's Handball Championship for the first time for both Brazil and South America as a whole.

== Achievements ==
- Austrian League:
  - Winner: 2013, 2014
- Austrian Cup:
  - Winner: 2013, 2014
- EHF Cup Winners' Cup
  - Winner: 2013
- World Championship:
  - Winner: 2013
- Pan American Games:
  - Winner: 2003, 2007, 2011
- Pan American Championship:
  - Winner: 2005, 2007, 2011, 2013, 2015
  - Silver Medalist: 2009
- South American Championship:
  - Winner: 2013
