= Daniela Piedade =

Brazilian handball player (born 1979)

Personal information
- Full name: Daniela de Oliveira Piedade
- Born: 2 March 1979 (age 47) São Paulo, Brazil
- Height: 1.74 m (5 ft 9 in)

Sport
- Sport: Handball
- Position: Pivot
- Number: 5

Senior clubs
- Years: Team
- 2003–2012: Hypo Niederösterreich
- 2012–2014: RK Krim
- 2014–2016: Siófok KC
- 2016–2017: Alba Fehérvár KC
- 2017-2018: HC Puig d'en Valls
National team
| Years | Team | Apps | (Gls) |
| – | Brazil | 191 | (342) |
Medal record
World Championship
| Gold medal – first place | 2013 Serbia |
Pan American Games
| Gold medal – first place | 2003 Santo Domingo | Team |
| Gold medal – first place | 2007 Rio de Janeiro | Team |
| Gold medal – first place | 2011 Guadalajara | Team |
| Gold medal – first place | 2015 Toronto | Team |
Pan American Championship
| Gold medal – first place | 2007 Brazil |
| Gold medal – first place | 2011 Brazil |
| Gold medal – first place | 2013 Dominican Republic |
| Gold medal – first place | 2015 Cuba |
| Silver medal – second place | 2009 Chile |

Daniela de Oliveira Piedade (born 2 March 1979) is a Brazilian former handball player. She played for the Brazilian national team, where she won the 2013 World Championship; the first for both Brazil and all of South America. She also participated at the 2004 Summer Olympics in Athens, at the 2008 Summer Olympics in Beijing and at the 2012 Summer Olympics in London, and lastly at the 2016 Olympics at home.

== Career ==
Piedade began playing handball in 1993.

=== Hypo NÖ ===
In 2002 she joined Austrian top team Hypo Niederösterreich. For the first 6 months at the club she played for the second team, and she was then promoted to the first team. During her time at the club she won both the Austrian League and the ÖHB Cup in every single season.

In 2008 she reached the final of the EHF Champions League with the club, where they lost to Russian Zvezda Zvenigorod.

=== RK Krim ===
In 2012 she joined Slovenian RK Krim. In September the same year she suffered a stroke shortly before a training match. This forced her to take a break, and she made her comeback in January 2013.

With RK Krim she won the 2013 and 2014 league and cup double.

=== Hungary ===
In 2014 she joined Hungarian Siófok KC.

Two years later she joined league rivals Fehérvár KC.

=== Puig d'en Valls ===
In 2017 she joined Spanish side HC Puig d'en Valls. A year later she retired from handball.

== National team ==
Piedade won gold medals at the 2003, 2007, 2011 and 2015.

She also represented Brazil at the 2004, 2008, 2012 and 2016.

Her biggest triumph came in 2013, when Brazil won the 2013 World Championship.

== Achievements ==
- Women Handball Austria:
  - Winner: 2004, 2005, 2006, 2007, 2008, 2009, 2010, 2011, 2012
- ÖHB Cup:
  - Winner: 2004, 2005, 2006, 2007, 2008, 2009, 2010, 2011, 2012
- EHF Champions League:
  - Finalist: 2008
  - Semifinalist: 2005, 2007, 2009, 2013
- EHF Cup Winners' Cup
  - Runners-Up: 2004
- EHF Champions Trophy
  - Runners-Up: 2008
- Pan American Championship:
  - Winner: 2007, 2011, 2013, 2015
  - Runners-Up: 2009
- Slovenian League:
  - Winner: 2013, 2014
- Slovenian Cup:
  - Winner: 2013, 2014
- World Championship:
  - Winner: 2013
