= Handball at the 2007 Pan American Games =

- Venue: Riocentro Sports Complex
- Dates: July 14–21, 2007
- Competitors: 240 from 10 nations

The Handball Competitions at the 2007 Pan American Games took place at the Riocentro Sports Complex in a temporary facility. There are two competitions, one each for men and women, each with eight national teams competing. Brazil is the defending champion for both the men's and women's competitions.

The teams compete in a multi-stage tournament. In each competition, the teams are divided into two four-team groups. In each group, each team plays against all others once, and the two best in each group advance to the semifinals to compete in the knockout tournament. The two teams in each group that do not make the semifinals play in 5th to 8th classification matches. The winning sides of both the men’s and women’s tournament will directly qualify for the 2008 Olympic Handball Tournaments.

== Medal winners ==
| Event | Gold | Silver | Bronze |
|---|---|---|---|
| Men | Brazil Maik Santos; Fernando Pacheco Filho; Carlos Ertel; Danilo Silva; Renato Rui; Bruno Souza; Leonardo Bortolini; Hélio Justino; Jaqson Kojoroski; Alexandre Vasconcelos; Silvio Laureano; Felipe Ribeiro; Bruno Santana; Jardel Pizzinatto; Gui Oliveira | Argentina Matías Schulz; Sergio Crevatin; Federico Pizarro; Matías Martín Lima; Mariano Castro; Maximiliano Ferro; Alejo Carrara; Leonardo Querin; Bruno Civelli; Facundo Torres; Fernando García; Emiliano la Rosa; Gonzalo Carou; Germán Pardales; Damián Migueles | Cuba Alfredo Quintana; Raifer Turino; Guillermo Corzo; Edgard Marti; Randy Díaz; Denip Fonseca; Denis Fernández; Rafael Capote; Jorge Pabán; Ariel Paz; Misael Iglesias; Frankis Carol; Yinkelly Tomacen; Daymaro Amador; Eurelbis Valdes |
| Women | Brazil Chana Masson; Fabiana Diniz; Alexandra do Nascimento; Fabiana Gripa; Deonise Cavaleiro; Daniela Piedade; Aline Rosas; Viviane Jacques; Lucila Silva; Juceli Rosa; Idalina Mesquita; Aline Santos; Eduarda Amorim; Milene Figueiredo; Darly de Paula | Cuba Maydelis Sardinas; Caridad Vizcay; Virgen Murillo; Ayling Martínez; Yasnay Torres; Arassay Durán; Ariagne Cuesta; Suleiky Gómez; Aida Despaigne; Lisandra Lusson; Neivys Mederos; Yohania Marti; Imara Valdéz; Nadezza Valera; Eneleidys Guevara | Argentina Silvina Schlesinger; Valentina Kogan; María del Carmen Alejandre; Cinthya Basile; Georgina Costantino; Bibiana Ferrea; Antonela Mena; Magdalena Decilio; Lucia Haro; María Emilia Acosta; Sonia Meyer; Silvana Totolo; Lucia Fernández; Mariana Sanguinetti; Solange Tagliavini |

== Men's competition ==
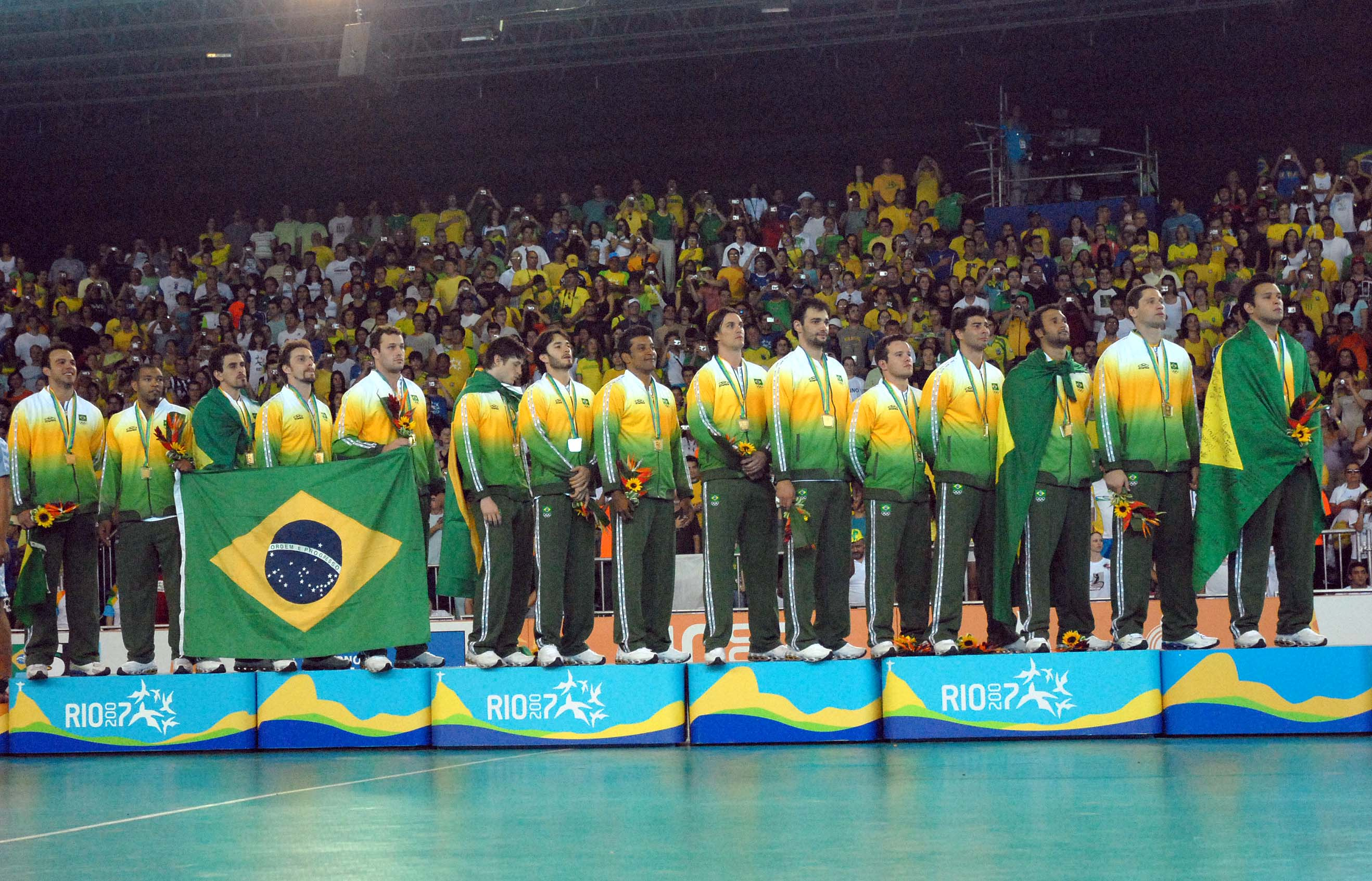
Brazil won the gold medal

=== Preliminary round ===
==== Group A ====
| Pos | Team | Pld | W | D | L | GF | GA | GD | Pts | Qualification |
|---|---|---|---|---|---|---|---|---|---|---|
| 1 | Argentina | 3 | 3 | 0 | 0 | 108 | 57 | +51 | 6 | Semifinals |
| 2 | Uruguay | 3 | 2 | 0 | 1 | 76 | 82 | −6 | 4 | Semifinals |
| 3 | Dominican Republic | 3 | 1 | 0 | 2 | 87 | 86 | +1 | 2 | 5–8th place semifinals |
| 4 | Mexico | 3 | 0 | 0 | 3 | 61 | 107 | −46 | 0 | 5–8th place semifinals |

Rules for classification: 1) points; 2) head-to-head points; 3) head-to-head goal difference; 4) head-to-head goals scored; 5) goal difference; 6) goals scored; 7) draw.

| 14 July 2007; 16:00 | Dominican Republic | 26–29 | Uruguay | Riocentro Sports Complex; Referees: De Mello, Favreto (BRA) |
| 14 July 2007; 16:00 | K. de León 7 | (12−13) | Wenzel 7 | Riocentro Sports Complex; Referees: De Mello, Favreto (BRA) |
| 14 July 2007; 16:00 | 4× (yellow card) 4× (suspension) | | 3× (yellow card) 2× (suspension) | Riocentro Sports Complex; Referees: De Mello, Favreto (BRA) |

| 14 July 2007; 20:00 | Argentina | 40–16 | Mexico | Riocentro Sports Complex; Referees: Paz, De Souza (BRA) |
| 14 July 2007; 20:00 | Torres 10 | (20−8) | Acuña 8 | Riocentro Sports Complex; Referees: Paz, De Souza (BRA) |
| 14 July 2007; 20:00 | 1× (yellow card) 3× (suspension) | | 2× (yellow card) 4× (suspension) | Riocentro Sports Complex; Referees: Paz, De Souza (BRA) |

| 16 July 2007; 14:00 | Dominican Republic | 36–24 | Mexico | Riocentro Sports Complex; Referees: De Souza, Paz (BRA) |
| 16 July 2007; 14:00 | Paulino 8 | (20−15) | three players 5 | Riocentro Sports Complex; Referees: De Souza, Paz (BRA) |
| 16 July 2007; 14:00 | 4× (yellow card) 8× (suspension) | | 3× (yellow card) 5× (suspension) | Riocentro Sports Complex; Referees: De Souza, Paz (BRA) |

| 16 July 2007; 22:00 | Argentina | 35–16 | Uruguay | Riocentro Sports Complex; Referees: Valdovinos, Pérez (PUR) |
| 16 July 2007; 22:00 | Lima 6 | (16−7) | Marrochi 6 | Riocentro Sports Complex; Referees: Valdovinos, Pérez (PUR) |
| 16 July 2007; 22:00 | 2× (yellow card) 4× (suspension) | | 3× (yellow card) 5× (suspension) | Riocentro Sports Complex; Referees: Valdovinos, Pérez (PUR) |

| 18 July 2007; 20:00 | Uruguay | 31–21 | Mexico | Riocentro Sports Complex; Referees: Adjemian, Gotz (ARG) |
| 18 July 2007; 20:00 | Marrochi 9 | (14–11) | Acuña 7 | Riocentro Sports Complex; Referees: Adjemian, Gotz (ARG) |
| 18 July 2007; 20:00 | 3× (yellow card) 4× (suspension) | | 3× (yellow card) 1× (suspension) | Riocentro Sports Complex; Referees: Adjemian, Gotz (ARG) |

| 18 July 2007; 22:00 | Argentina | 33–25 | Dominican Republic | Riocentro Sports Complex; Referees: Menezes, Pinto (BRA) |
| 18 July 2007; 22:00 | Lima 6 | (14–14) | Romero 7 | Riocentro Sports Complex; Referees: Menezes, Pinto (BRA) |
| 18 July 2007; 22:00 | 3× (yellow card) 3× (suspension) | | 4× (yellow card) 4× (suspension) 1× (red card) | Riocentro Sports Complex; Referees: Menezes, Pinto (BRA) |

==== Group B ====
| Pos | Team | Pld | W | D | L | GF | GA | GD | Pts | Qualification |
|---|---|---|---|---|---|---|---|---|---|---|
| 1 | Brazil (H) | 3 | 3 | 0 | 0 | 99 | 58 | +41 | 6 | Semifinals |
| 2 | Cuba | 3 | 2 | 0 | 1 | 99 | 73 | +26 | 4 | Semifinals |
| 3 | Chile | 3 | 1 | 0 | 2 | 67 | 93 | −26 | 2 | 5–8th place semifinals |
| 4 | Canada | 3 | 0 | 0 | 3 | 52 | 93 | −41 | 0 | 5–8th place semifinals |

Rules for classification: 1) points; 2) head-to-head points; 3) head-to-head goal difference; 4) head-to-head goals scored; 5) goal difference; 6) goals scored; 7) draw.
(H) Hosts

| 14 July 2007; 14:00 | Brazil | 33–20 | Chile | Riocentro Sports Complex; Referees: Robledo, Sobenko (ARG) |
| 14 July 2007; 14:00 | Borges 8 | (14−10) | Feuchtmann 6 | Riocentro Sports Complex; Referees: Robledo, Sobenko (ARG) |
| 14 July 2007; 14:00 | 3× (yellow card) 4× (suspension) | | 3× (yellow card) 3× (suspension) | Riocentro Sports Complex; Referees: Robledo, Sobenko (ARG) |

| 14 July 2007; 22:00 | Cuba | 33–20 | Canada | Riocentro Sports Complex; Referees: Adjemian, Gotz (ARG) |
| 14 July 2007; 22:00 | Corzo 8 | (17−9) | Bertrand, Fyfe 4 | Riocentro Sports Complex; Referees: Adjemian, Gotz (ARG) |
| 14 July 2007; 22:00 | 3× (yellow card) 7× (suspension) 1× (red card) | | 3× (yellow card) 3× (suspension) | Riocentro Sports Complex; Referees: Adjemian, Gotz (ARG) |

| 16 July 2007; 16:00 | Brazil | 31–12 | Canada | Riocentro Sports Complex; Referees: Adjemian, Gotz (ARG) |
| 16 July 2007; 16:00 | Borges, Bortolini 5 | (17−7) | Godin 5 | Riocentro Sports Complex; Referees: Adjemian, Gotz (ARG) |
| 16 July 2007; 16:00 | 2× (yellow card) 1× (suspension) | | 3× (yellow card) 2× (suspension) | Riocentro Sports Complex; Referees: Adjemian, Gotz (ARG) |

| 16 July 2007; 20:00 | Cuba | 40–18 | Chile | Riocentro Sports Complex; Referees: Adjemian, Gotz (ARG) |
| 16 July 2007; 20:00 | Paván 7 | (18−9) | Feuchtmann, Salinas 3 | Riocentro Sports Complex; Referees: Adjemian, Gotz (ARG) |
| 16 July 2007; 20:00 | 2× (yellow card) 5× (suspension) 2× (red card) | | 3× (yellow card) 5× (suspension) 1× (red card) | Riocentro Sports Complex; Referees: Adjemian, Gotz (ARG) |

| 18 July 2007; 14:00 | Canada | 20–29 | Chile | Riocentro Sports Complex; Referees: Valdovinos, Pérez (PUR) |
| 18 July 2007; 14:00 | Bessette 6 | (12–12) | Feuchtmann 11 | Riocentro Sports Complex; Referees: Valdovinos, Pérez (PUR) |
| 18 July 2007; 14:00 | 3× (yellow card) 5× (suspension) | | 2× (yellow card) 2× (suspension) | Riocentro Sports Complex; Referees: Valdovinos, Pérez (PUR) |

| 18 July 2007; 16:00 | Brazil | 35–26 | Cuba | Riocentro Sports Complex; Referees: Bord, Buy (FRA) |
| 18 July 2007; 16:00 | Borges, Souza 7 | (18–10) | Corzo, Paván 8 | Riocentro Sports Complex; Referees: Bord, Buy (FRA) |
| 18 July 2007; 16:00 | 3× (yellow card) 5× (suspension) | | 3× (yellow card) 6× (suspension) 1× (red card) | Riocentro Sports Complex; Referees: Bord, Buy (FRA) |

=== Knockout stage ===
==== Bracket ====
Semifinals
20 July
Brazil | 28
Uruguay | 16
20 July
Argentina (OT) | 30
Cuba | 29

Final
22 July
Brazil | 30
Argentina | 22
Third place
22 July
Uruguay | 23
Cuba | 24

5–8th place semifinals
20 July
Chile | 28
Mexico | 27
20 July
Dominican Republic | 28
Canada | 27

Fifth place
22 July
Chile | 28
Dominican Republic | 27
Seventh place
22 July
Mexico | 32
Canada (OT) | 34

==== 5–8th place semifinals ====
| 20 July 2007; 14:00 | Chile | 28–27 | Mexico | Riocentro Sports Complex; Referees: De Souza, Paz (BRA) |
| 20 July 2007; 14:00 | Feuchtmann 9 | (17−12) | Acuña 7 | Riocentro Sports Complex; Referees: De Souza, Paz (BRA) |
| 20 July 2007; 14:00 | 3× (yellow card) 5× (suspension) | | 3× (yellow card) 5× (suspension) 1× (red card) | Riocentro Sports Complex; Referees: De Souza, Paz (BRA) |

| 20 July 2007; 20:00 | Dominican Republic | 28–27 | Canada | Riocentro Sports Complex; Referees: De Mello, Favreto (BRA) |
| 20 July 2007; 20:00 | K. de León 6 | (16−12) | Bertrand 7 | Riocentro Sports Complex; Referees: De Mello, Favreto (BRA) |
| 20 July 2007; 20:00 | 3× (yellow card) 5× (suspension) 1× (red card) | | 3× (yellow card) 4× (suspension) | Riocentro Sports Complex; Referees: De Mello, Favreto (BRA) |

==== Semifinals ====
| 20 July 2007; 16:00 | Brazil | 28–16 | Uruguay | Riocentro Sports Complex; Referees: Robledo, Sobenko (ARG) |
| 20 July 2007; 16:00 | Bortolini 6 | (15−6) | Wenzel 4 | Riocentro Sports Complex; Referees: Robledo, Sobenko (ARG) |
| 20 July 2007; 16:00 | 3× (yellow card) 3× (suspension) | | 4× (yellow card) 4× (suspension) | Riocentro Sports Complex; Referees: Robledo, Sobenko (ARG) |

20 July 2007
22:00
Argentina
30–29 (ET)
Cuba
Riocentro Sports Complex
Referees: Menezes, Pinto (BRA)
Civelli 10
(12−14)
Paván 13
3× (yellow card) 10× (suspension)

3× (yellow card) 8× (suspension) 1× (red card)

FT: 25−25 ET: 5−4

==== Seventh place game ====
22 July 2007
17:00
Mexico
32–34 (ET)
Canada
Riocentro Sports Complex
Referees: Pinto, Ortiz (CHI)
Acuña 10
(9−12)
Bertrand 8
3× (yellow card) 3× (suspension) 1× (red card)

3× (yellow card) 3× (suspension)

FT: 23−23 ET: 5−5, 4−6

==== Fifth place game ====
| 22 July 2007; 15:00 | Chile | 28–27 | Dominican Republic | Riocentro Sports Complex; Referees: Valdovinos, Pérez (PUR) |
| 22 July 2007; 15:00 | Feuchtmann 8 | (14−12) | Paulino 7 | Riocentro Sports Complex; Referees: Valdovinos, Pérez (PUR) |
| 22 July 2007; 15:00 | 1× (yellow card) 2× (suspension) | | 4× (yellow card) 1× (suspension) | Riocentro Sports Complex; Referees: Valdovinos, Pérez (PUR) |

==== Bronze medal game ====
| 22 July 2007; 09:00 | Uruguay | 23–24 | Cuba | Riocentro Sports Complex; Referees: De Souza, Paz (BRA) |
| 22 July 2007; 09:00 | Marrochi 8 | (10−11) | Corzo 9 | Riocentro Sports Complex; Referees: De Souza, Paz (BRA) |
| 22 July 2007; 09:00 | 3× (yellow card) 6× (suspension) | | 2× (yellow card) 7× (suspension) 1× (red card) | Riocentro Sports Complex; Referees: De Souza, Paz (BRA) |

==== Gold medal game ====
| 22 July 2007; 11:00 | Brazil | 30–22 | Argentina | Riocentro Sports Complex; Referees: Bord, Buy (FRA) |
| 22 July 2007; 11:00 | Souza 9 | (11−6) | Civelli 6 | Riocentro Sports Complex; Referees: Bord, Buy (FRA) |
| 22 July 2007; 11:00 | 2× (yellow card) 7× (suspension) 4× (red card) | | 3× (yellow card) 5× (suspension) 2× (red card) | Riocentro Sports Complex; Referees: Bord, Buy (FRA) |

=== Ranking and statistics ===
| Rank | Team |
|---|---|
| 1st place, gold medalist(s) | Brazil |
| 2nd place, silver medalist(s) | Argentina |
| 3rd place, bronze medalist(s) | Cuba |
| 4 | Uruguay |
| 5 | Chile |
| 6 | Dominican Republic |
| 7 | Canada |
| 8 | Mexico |

| Qualified for the 2008 Summer Olympics |
| Qualified for the Olympic Qualification Tournament |

2007 Pan American Games winners

Brazil
Second title

==== Top scorers ====
| Rank | Name | Goals | Shots | % |
|---|---|---|---|---|
| 1 | (Cuba) Guillermo Corzo | 39 | 66 | 59 |
| 2 | (Mexico) Marcial Acuña | 37 | 73 | 51 |
| 2 | (Chile) Emil Feuchtmann | 37 | 65 | 57 |
| 4 | (Cuba) Jorge Paván | 36 | 56 | 64 |
| 5 | (Argentina) Facundo Torres | 29 | 45 | 64 |
| 5 | (Dominican Republic) Kelvin de León | 29 | 49 | 59 |

==== Top goalkeepers ====
(minimum 20% of total shots received by team)

| Rank | Name | % | Saves | Shots |
|---|---|---|---|---|
| 1 | (Brazil) Maik dos Santos | 49 | 51 | 105 |
| 2 | (Dominican Republic) Luis Sanlate | 47 | 22 | 47 |
| 3 | (Argentina) Germán Pardales | 42 | 19 | 45 |
| 4 | (Brazil) Alexandre Vasconcelos | 41 | 29 | 71 |
| 5 | (Cuba) Misael Iglesias | 39 | 73 | 185 |

== Women's competition ==
=== Preliminary round ===
==== Group A ====
| Pos | Team | Pld | W | D | L | GF | GA | GD | Pts | Qualification |
|---|---|---|---|---|---|---|---|---|---|---|
| 1 | Argentina | 3 | 3 | 0 | 0 | 94 | 52 | +42 | 6 | Semifinals |
| 2 | Dominican Republic | 3 | 2 | 0 | 1 | 83 | 77 | +6 | 4 | Semifinals |
| 3 | Paraguay | 3 | 1 | 0 | 2 | 84 | 88 | −4 | 2 | 5–8th place semifinals |
| 4 | Puerto Rico | 3 | 0 | 0 | 3 | 61 | 105 | −44 | 0 | 5–8th place semifinals |

Rules for classification: 1) points; 2) head-to-head points; 3) head-to-head goal difference; 4) head-to-head goals scored; 5) goal difference; 6) goals scored; 7) draw.

| 13 July 2007; 08:00 | Dominican Republic | 33–30 | Paraguay | Riocentro Sports Complex; Referees: Pinto, Menezes (BRA) |
| 13 July 2007; 08:00 | Granado 11 | (14−9) | Aluan 11 | Riocentro Sports Complex; Referees: Pinto, Menezes (BRA) |
| 13 July 2007; 08:00 | 3× (yellow card) 5× (suspension) 1× (red card) | | 4× (yellow card) 8× (suspension) | Riocentro Sports Complex; Referees: Pinto, Menezes (BRA) |

| 13 July 2007; 14:00 | Argentina | 39–14 | Puerto Rico | Riocentro Sports Complex; Referees: Pinto, Ortiz (CHI) |
| 13 July 2007; 14:00 | Acosta 10 | (17−7) | García 3 | Riocentro Sports Complex; Referees: Pinto, Ortiz (CHI) |
| 13 July 2007; 14:00 | 3× (yellow card) 4× (suspension) | | 4× (yellow card) 5× (suspension) | Riocentro Sports Complex; Referees: Pinto, Ortiz (CHI) |

| 15 July 2007; 15:00 | Argentina | 29–23 | Paraguay | Riocentro Sports Complex; Referees: Bord, Buy (FRA) |
| 15 July 2007; 15:00 | Acosta 6 | (11−10) | Aluan 11 | Riocentro Sports Complex; Referees: Bord, Buy (FRA) |
| 15 July 2007; 15:00 | 3× (yellow card) 4× (suspension) | | 3× (yellow card) 3× (suspension) | Riocentro Sports Complex; Referees: Bord, Buy (FRA) |

| 15 July 2007; 19:00 | Dominican Republic | 35–21 | Puerto Rico | Riocentro Sports Complex; Referees: De Mello, Favreto (BRA) |
| 15 July 2007; 19:00 | Granado 11 | (19−12) | Correa 6 | Riocentro Sports Complex; Referees: De Mello, Favreto (BRA) |
| 15 July 2007; 19:00 | 3× (yellow card) 6× (suspension) | | 3× (yellow card) 3× (suspension) | Riocentro Sports Complex; Referees: De Mello, Favreto (BRA) |

| 17 July 2007; 20:00 | Paraguay | 31–26 | Puerto Rico | Riocentro Sports Complex; Referees: Robledo, Zobenko (ARG) |
| 17 July 2007; 20:00 | Aluan 14 | (14−12) | García 7 | Riocentro Sports Complex; Referees: Robledo, Zobenko (ARG) |
| 17 July 2007; 20:00 | 3× (yellow card) 5× (suspension) 1× (red card) | | 3× (yellow card) 4× (suspension) | Riocentro Sports Complex; Referees: Robledo, Zobenko (ARG) |

| 17 July 2007; 22:00 | Argentina | 26–15 | Dominican Republic | Riocentro Sports Complex; Referees: De Mello, Favreto (BRA) |
| 17 July 2007; 22:00 | Basile 5 | (13−4) | Granado 5 | Riocentro Sports Complex; Referees: De Mello, Favreto (BRA) |
| 17 July 2007; 22:00 | 3× (yellow card) 4× (suspension) | | 3× (yellow card) 5× (suspension) | Riocentro Sports Complex; Referees: De Mello, Favreto (BRA) |

==== Group B ====
| Pos | Team | Pld | W | D | L | GF | GA | GD | Pts | Qualification |
|---|---|---|---|---|---|---|---|---|---|---|
| 1 | Brazil (H) | 3 | 3 | 0 | 0 | 107 | 53 | +54 | 6 | Semifinals |
| 2 | Cuba | 3 | 2 | 0 | 1 | 97 | 72 | +25 | 4 | Semifinals |
| 3 | Mexico | 3 | 1 | 0 | 2 | 53 | 89 | −36 | 2 | 5–8th place semifinals |
| 4 | Canada | 3 | 0 | 0 | 3 | 55 | 98 | −43 | 0 | 5–8th place semifinals |

Rules for classification: 1) points; 2) head-to-head points; 3) head-to-head goal difference; 4) head-to-head goals scored; 5) goal difference; 6) goals scored; 7) draw.
(H) Hosts

| 13 July 2007; 10:00 | Brazil | 38–15 | Mexico | Riocentro Sports Complex; Referees: Adjemian, Gotz (ARG) |
| 13 July 2007; 10:00 | Piedade 6 | (21−4) | Sifuentes 7 | Riocentro Sports Complex; Referees: Adjemian, Gotz (ARG) |
| 13 July 2007; 10:00 | 3× (yellow card) 4× (suspension) | | 3× (yellow card) 8× (suspension) | Riocentro Sports Complex; Referees: Adjemian, Gotz (ARG) |

| 13 July 2007; 12:00 | Cuba | 38–25 | Canada | Riocentro Sports Complex; Referees: Valdovinos, Pérez (PUR) |
| 13 July 2007; 12:00 | Gómez 11 | (17−11) | Pilon 6 | Riocentro Sports Complex; Referees: Valdovinos, Pérez (PUR) |
| 13 July 2007; 12:00 | 2× (yellow card) 5× (suspension) | | 3× (yellow card) 8× (suspension) | Riocentro Sports Complex; Referees: Valdovinos, Pérez (PUR) |

| 15 July 2007; 13:00 | Brazil | 37–10 | Canada | Riocentro Sports Complex; Referees: Pinto, Ortiz (CHI) |
| 15 July 2007; 13:00 | Santos 6 | (21−3) | Gagnon, Taupier 2 | Riocentro Sports Complex; Referees: Pinto, Ortiz (CHI) |
| 15 July 2007; 13:00 | 3× (yellow card) 2× (suspension) | | 3× (yellow card) 3× (suspension) | Riocentro Sports Complex; Referees: Pinto, Ortiz (CHI) |

| 15 July 2007; 21:00 | Cuba | 31–15 | Mexico | Riocentro Sports Complex; Referees: Menezes, Pinto (BRA) |
| 15 July 2007; 21:00 | Duran, Turro 6 | (14−8) | Y. García, Sifuentes 3 | Riocentro Sports Complex; Referees: Menezes, Pinto (BRA) |
| 15 July 2007; 21:00 | 3× (yellow card) 2× (suspension) | | 3× (yellow card) 5× (suspension) | Riocentro Sports Complex; Referees: Menezes, Pinto (BRA) |

| 17 July 2007; 14:00 | Canada | 20–23 | Mexico | Riocentro Sports Complex; Referees: Pinto, Ortiz (CHI) |
| 17 July 2007; 14:00 | Smart 5 | (13−10) | Sifuentes 6 | Riocentro Sports Complex; Referees: Pinto, Ortiz (CHI) |
| 17 July 2007; 14:00 | 2× (yellow card) 2× (suspension) 1× (red card) | | 3× (yellow card) 5× (suspension) | Riocentro Sports Complex; Referees: Pinto, Ortiz (CHI) |

| 17 July 2007; 16:00 | Brazil | 32–28 | Cuba | Riocentro Sports Complex; Referees: Bord, Buy (FRA) |
| 17 July 2007; 16:00 | Fachinello 9 | (16−14) | Duran, Gómez 9 | Riocentro Sports Complex; Referees: Bord, Buy (FRA) |
| 17 July 2007; 16:00 | 2× (yellow card) 7× (suspension) | | 2× (yellow card) 5× (suspension) 1× (red card) | Riocentro Sports Complex; Referees: Bord, Buy (FRA) |

=== Knockout stage ===
==== Bracket ====
Semifinals
19 July
Brazil | 46
Dominican Republic | 13
19 July
Argentina | 25
Cuba | 37

Final
21 July
Brazil | 30
Cuba | 17
Third place
21 July
Dominican Republic | 22
Argentina | 23

5–8th place semifinals
19 July
Mexico | 21
Puerto Rico | 20
19 July
Paraguay | 22
Canada | 26

Fifth place
21 July
Mexico (pen.) | 37
Canada | 36
Seventh place
21 July
Puerto Rico | 21
Paraguay | 22

==== 5–8th place semifinals ====
| 19 July 2007; 14:00 | Mexico | 21–20 | Puerto Rico | Riocentro Sports Complex; Referees: Robledo, Sobenko (ARG) |
| 19 July 2007; 14:00 | Sifuentes 8 | (6−8) | García 8 | Riocentro Sports Complex; Referees: Robledo, Sobenko (ARG) |
| 19 July 2007; 14:00 | 3× (yellow card) 6× (suspension) 1× (red card) | | 2× (yellow card) 4× (suspension) | Riocentro Sports Complex; Referees: Robledo, Sobenko (ARG) |

| 19 July 2007; 20:00 | Paraguay | 22–26 | Canada | Riocentro Sports Complex; Referees: Pinto, Ortiz (FRA) |
| 19 July 2007; 20:00 | Aluan 12 | (11−14) | Gagnon 7 | Riocentro Sports Complex; Referees: Pinto, Ortiz (FRA) |
| 19 July 2007; 20:00 | 4× (yellow card) 3× (suspension) 1× (red card) | | 3× (yellow card) 4× (suspension) | Riocentro Sports Complex; Referees: Pinto, Ortiz (FRA) |

==== Semifinals ====
| 19 July 2007; 16:00 | Brazil | 46–13 | Dominican Republic | Riocentro Sports Complex; Referees: Valdovinos, Pérez (PUR) |
| 19 July 2007; 16:00 | Piedade 11 | (24−6) | Granado 3 | Riocentro Sports Complex; Referees: Valdovinos, Pérez (PUR) |
| 19 July 2007; 16:00 | 1× (yellow card) 1× (suspension) | | 4× (yellow card) 1× (suspension) | Riocentro Sports Complex; Referees: Valdovinos, Pérez (PUR) |

| 19 July 2007; 22:00 | Argentina | 25–37 | Cuba | Riocentro Sports Complex; Referees: Bord, Buy (FRA) |
| 19 July 2007; 22:00 | Decilio 5 | (9−20) | Martínez 13 | Riocentro Sports Complex; Referees: Bord, Buy (FRA) |
| 19 July 2007; 22:00 | 2× (yellow card) 6× (suspension) | | 3× (yellow card) 10× (suspension) | Riocentro Sports Complex; Referees: Bord, Buy (FRA) |

==== Seventh place game ====
| 21 July 2007; 17:30 | Puerto Rico | 21–22 | Paraguay | Riocentro Sports Complex; Referees: Robledo, Sobenko (ARG) |
| 21 July 2007; 17:30 | Correa 6 | (13−12) | Aluan 9 | Riocentro Sports Complex; Referees: Robledo, Sobenko (ARG) |
| 21 July 2007; 17:30 | 3× (yellow card) 4× (suspension) | | 3× (yellow card) 6× (suspension) | Riocentro Sports Complex; Referees: Robledo, Sobenko (ARG) |

==== Fifth place game ====
21 July 2007
15:00
Mexico
37–36 (ET)
Canada
Riocentro Sports Complex
Referees: Pinto, Ortiz (FRA)
Aluan 12
(11−8)
Gagnon 7
3× (yellow card) 8× (suspension)

3× (yellow card) 4× (suspension)

FT: 22−22 ET: 2−2, 4−4 Pen: 9−8

==== Bronze medal game ====
| 21 July 2007; 08:30 | Dominican Republic | 22–23 | Argentina | Riocentro Sports Complex; Referees: De Mello, Favreto (BRA) |
| 21 July 2007; 08:30 | Granado 11 | (11−11) | Acosta 5 | Riocentro Sports Complex; Referees: De Mello, Favreto (BRA) |
| 21 July 2007; 08:30 | 4× (yellow card) 6× (suspension) | | 3× (yellow card) 7× (suspension) | Riocentro Sports Complex; Referees: De Mello, Favreto (BRA) |

==== Gold medal game ====
| 21 July 2007; 10:30 | Brazil | 30–17 | Cuba | Riocentro Sports Complex; Referees: Adjemian, Gotz (ARG) |
| 21 July 2007; 10:30 | Diniz, Gripa 5 | (15−8) | Gómez 6 | Riocentro Sports Complex; Referees: Adjemian, Gotz (ARG) |
| 21 July 2007; 10:30 | 3× (yellow card) 6× (suspension) | | 3× (yellow card) 7× (suspension) 2× (red card) | Riocentro Sports Complex; Referees: Adjemian, Gotz (ARG) |

=== Ranking and statistics ===
| Rank | Team |
|---|---|
| 1st place, gold medalist(s) | Brazil |
| 2nd place, silver medalist(s) | Cuba |
| 3rd place, bronze medalist(s) | Argentina |
| 4 | Dominican Republic |
| 5 | Mexico |
| 6 | Canada |
| 7 | Paraguay |
| 8 | Puerto Rico |

| Qualified for the 2008 Summer Olympics |
| Qualified for the Olympic Qualification Tournament |

2007 Pan American Games winners

Brazil
Third title

==== Top scorers ====
| Rank | Name | Goals | Shots | % |
|---|---|---|---|---|
| 1 | (Paraguay) Fabiana Aluan | 57 | 112 | 51 |
| 2 | (Dominican Republic) Judith Granado | 41 | 62 | 66 |
| 3 | (Cuba) Suleiky Gómez | 35 | 60 | 58 |
| 4 | (Mexico) Selene Sifuentes | 34 | 61 | 56 |
| 5 | (Cuba) Ayling Martínez | 28 | 35 | 80 |

==== Top goalkeepers ====
(minimum 20% of total shots received by team)

| Rank | Name | % | Saves | Shots |
|---|---|---|---|---|
| 1 | (Brazil) Darly de Paula | 53 | 46 | 87 |
| 2 | (Brazil) Chana Masson | 45 | 35 | 77 |
| 3 | (Argentina) Valentina Kogan | 34 | 47 | 138 |
| 4 | (Paraguay) Carmen Melgarejo | 33 | 39 | 117 |
| 5 | (Cuba) Maydelis Sardiñas | 32 | 27 | 85 |

== See also ==
- List of Pan American Games medalists in handball (men)
