= Fernanda da Silva =

Brazilian handball player (born 1989)

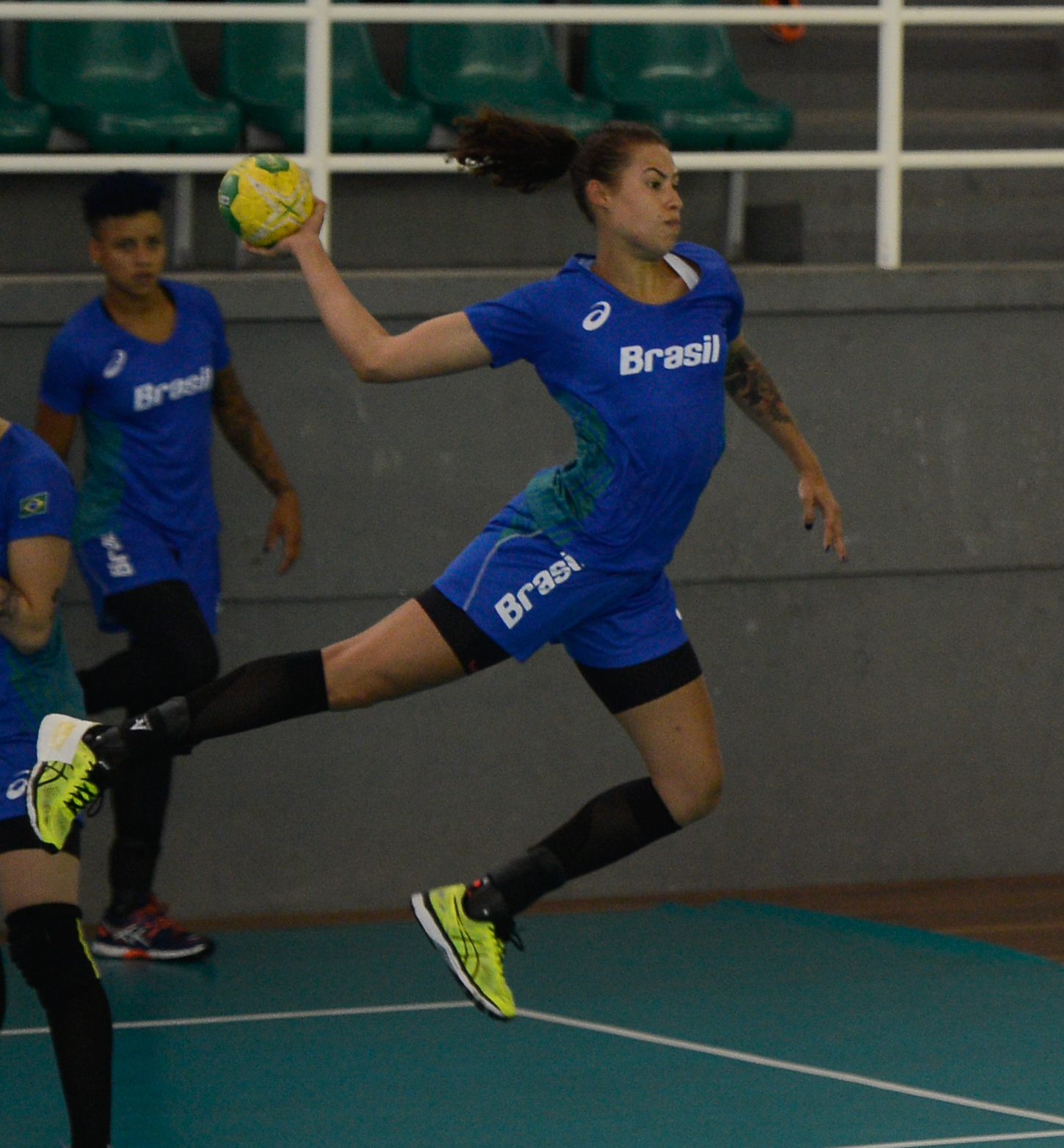
- Da Silva in 2016

Personal information
- Full name: Fernanda França da Silva
- Born: 25 September 1989 (age 37) São Bernardo do Campo, Brazil
- Height: 1.76 m (5 ft 9 in)

Sport
- Sport: Handball
- Position: Left wing
- Current club: Super Amara Bera Bera
- Number: 89

Senior clubs
- Years: Team
- 2006–2010: Metodista/São Bernardo
- 2010–2011: BM Sagunto
- 2011–2014: Hypo Niederösterreich
- 2014–2016: CSM București
- 2016–2017: SG BBM Bietigheim
- 2018–2018: Super Amara Bera Bera
National team
Years	Team	Apps	(Gls)
2009-2017	Brazil	104	(305)
Medal record
World Championship
Gold medal – first place	2013 Serbia
Pan American Games
Gold medal – first place	2011 Guadalajara	Team
Gold medal – first place	2015 Toronto	Team
Pan American Championship
Gold medal – first place	2011 Brazil
Gold medal – first place	2013 Dominican Republic
Silver medal – second place	2009 Argentina
South American Championship
Gold medal – first place	2013 Argentina

Fernanda França da Silva (born 25 September 1989) is a Brazilian female handballer who plays as a left winger. She has previously played for the Brazilian national team. In 2013 she won the World Championship; the first time ever for Brazil and South America.

== Career ==
Fernanda da Silva began playing handball at Metodista/São Bernardo. In February 2010 she joined Spanish side BM Sagunto.

=== Hypo NÖ ===
In the summer of 2011 she joined Austrian top club Hypo Niederösterreich, who had a cooperation with the Brazilian Handball Confederation and a history of having many Brazilian national team players. Here she won the Austrian League and Cup double three times in a row from 2012 to 2014.

=== CSM București ===
In 2014 she joined Romanian CSM București together with Brazilian team mate Ana Paula Belo. Together with three other Brazilian players she won the Romanian National League in 2015, which was the first in club history.

In her second season at the club she won the league for a second time in 2016, and this time she also won the Romanian cup and the 2016 Champions League, beating Hungarian Gyor in the final.

=== SG BBM Bietigheim ===
In 2016 she joined German side SG BBM Bietigheim. In November 2016 she took a break from handball due to pregnancy. The same season they won the German Championship.

=== Bera Bera ===
In 2018 she joined Spanish BM Bera Bera, but left the club already in December the same year.

== National team ==
Fernanda da Silva won silver medals at the 2009 Pan American Championship, losing to Argentina in the final. Two years later she would win the 2011 edition. She defended her title at 2013 Pan American Championship. With 55 goals she was the tournament top scorer.

At the 2012 Olympics in London she came in 6th place with the Brazilian team.

In 2013 she was part of the Brazilian team that won the 2013 World Championship.

In 2011 she won gold medals at the 2011 Pan American Games, beating Argentina in the final. At the 2015 Pan American Games she won gold medals once again.

She represented Brazil once again at the 2016 Olympics in Rio.

== Achievements ==
- Austrian League:
  - Winner: 2012, 2013, 2014
- Austrian Cup:
  - Winner: 2012, 2013, 2014
- Romanian National League:
  - Winner: 2015, 2016
- Romanian Cup:
  - Finalist: 2015
- EHF Champions League:
  - Winner: 2016
- EHF Cup Winners' Cup:
  - Winner: 2013
- Pan American Games:
  - Winner: 2011
- World Championship:
  - Winner: 2013
- Pan American Championship:
  - Winner: 2011, 2013
- South American Championship:
  - Winner: 2013
- Provident Cup:
  - Winner: 2013

== Awards and recognition ==
- All Star Team Left Wing of the Pan American Championship: 2009
- Austrian Handball Federation Left Wing of the Year – Women: 2013
- Pan American Championship Top Scorer: 2013
