= Alexandra do Nascimento =

Brazilian handball player (born 1981)

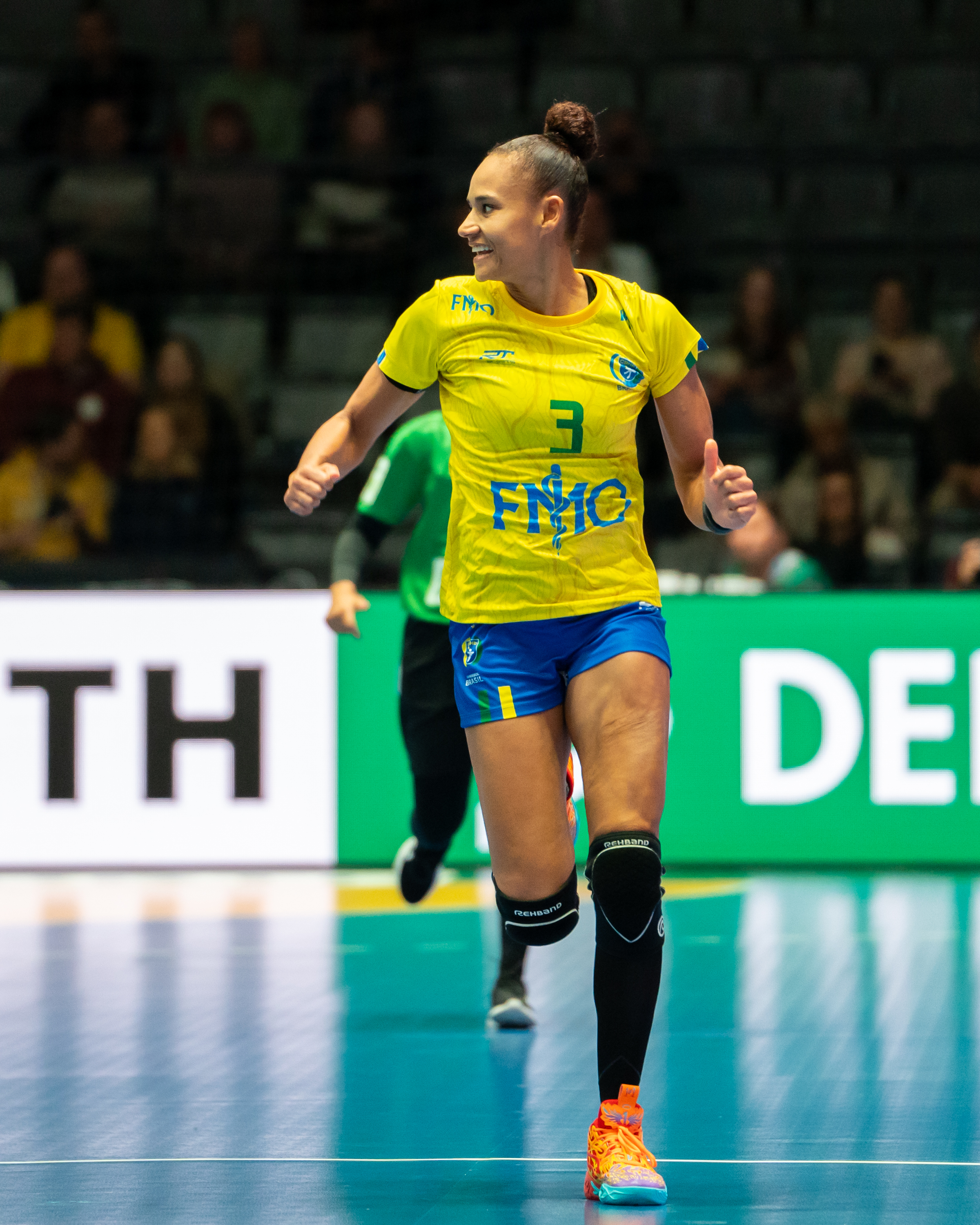
- do Nascimento in 2025

Personal information
- Full name: Alexandra Priscila do Nascimento Martínez
- Born: 16 September 1981 (age 45) Limeira, Brazil
- Height: 1.77 m (5 ft 10 in)

Sport
- Sport: Handball
- Position: Right wing

Senior clubs
- Years: Team
- –: Jundiai
- –2003: (Brazil) Guarulhos
- 2003–2014: (Austria) Hypo Niederösterreich
- 2014–2016: (Romania) HCM Baia Mare
- 2016–2017: (Hungary) Váci NKSE
- 2017–2019: (Hungary) Alba Fehérvár KC
- 2019–2020: (Hungary) Érd NK
- 2020–2022: (France) Bourg-de-Péage DHB
- 2022–2024: (Spain) CB Elche
- 2025–: (Italy) Handball Erice
National team
Years	Team	Apps	(Gls)
1998–	Brazil	205	(789)
Medal record
World Championship
Gold medal – first place	2013 Serbia
Pan American Games
Gold medal – first place	2003 Dominican Republic	Team
Gold medal – first place	2007 Rio de Janeiro	Team
Gold medal – first place	2011 Guadalajara	Team
Gold medal – first place	2015 Toronto	Team
Pan American Championship
Gold medal – first place	2003 Brazil
Gold medal – first place	2005 Brazil
Gold medal – first place	2007 Brazil
Gold medal – first place	2011 Brazil
Gold medal – first place	2013 Dominican Republic
Silver medal – second place	2009 Chile
South American Championship
Gold medal – first place	2013 Argentina

Alexandra Priscila do Nascimento Martínez (born 16 September 1981) is a Brazilian handball player. She played in the Brazilian national team. She is a world champion from 2013, the first in history Brazil won the title. In 2012 she was named IHF World Player of the Year, the first South American, male or female, to win the award.

== Career ==
=== Youth career ===
She was born in 1981 in Limeira (São Paulo) but she soon moved to Espírito Santo where she grew up. She started playing handball aged 10.

=== Hypo NÖ ===
She moved to Austria in 2004 to join Hypo NÖ, a club that is noted for having many Brazilian national team players. Here she won the Austrian championship and Cup double 10 times in a row from 2004 to 2014. In 2008 she reached the final of the Champions League, where they lost to Russian Zvezda Zvenigorod. In 2013 she won the EHF Cup Winners' Cup with the club.

In 2012, she was the first Brazilian handballer to be voted IHF World Player of the Year.

=== Romania ===
On 14 February 2014 she announced that she would leave Hypo NÖ, and together with Bárbara Arenhart she joined Romanian HCM Baia Mare on a two year contract.

=== Hungary ===
In 2016 she joined Hungarian Ipress Center-Vác. A year later she joined Alba Fehérvár KC. In 2019 she joined Érd HC.

=== Retirements and comebacks ===
At the end of the 2019-2020 season, she announced her retirement, but quickly reconsidered and joined French side Bourg-de-Péage Drôme Handball.

In February 2022 she announced her retirement and the fact that she was pregnant at the same time. In October 2022 she came back to handball for a second time and joined Spanish side Club Balonmano Elche, where she made her debut for the club on 28 December 2022. With the club she won the 2024 EHF European League. After the 2023-24 she announced her retirement for a third time, but would once again come back. This time she joined Italian AC Life Style Handball Erice in January 2025.

== National team ==
At the 2011 World Championship at home soil she was the top scorer at the tournament with 57 goals.

In 2016, she was chosen for the third time to be in Brazil's Olympic handball team. She was the top scorer in her first two games.

== Achievements ==
- Austrian League:
  - Winner: 2004, 2005, 2006, 2007, 2008, 2009, 2010, 2011, 2012, 2013, 2014
- Austrian Cup:
  - Winner: 2004, 2005, 2006, 2007, 2008, 2009, 2010, 2011, 2012, 2013, 2014
- Romanian League:
  - Finalist: 2015
- Romanian Cup:
  - Winner: 2015
- EHF Champions League:
  - Finalist: 2008
  - Semifinalist: 2005, 2007, 2009
- EHF Cup Winners' Cup
  - Winner: 2013
  - Runners-up: 2004
- EHF Champions Trophy
  - Runners-up: 2008
- Baia Mare Champions Trophy:
  - Winner: 2014
- Pan American Games:
  - Winner: 2003, 2007, 2011, 2015
- World Championship:
  - Winner: 2013
- Pan American Championship:
  - Winner: 2003, 2005, 2007, 2011, 2013
  - Silver Medalist: 2009
- South American Championship:
  - Winner: 2013
- Provident Cup:
  - Winner: 2013

== Awards and recognition ==
- World Championship Top Scorer: 2011
- World Championship Second Best Scorer: 2013
- EHF Champions League Second Best Scorer: 2010
- All-Star Right Wing of the Summer Olympics: 2012
- IHF World Player of the Year – Women: 2012
- Austrian Handball Federation Right Wing of the Year – Women: 2013
- Most Valuable Player Pan American Championship: 2013

== Personal life ==
Since July 2011, she is married to Chilean international handballer, Patricio Martínez.
