= Samira Rocha =

Brazilian handball player (born 1989)

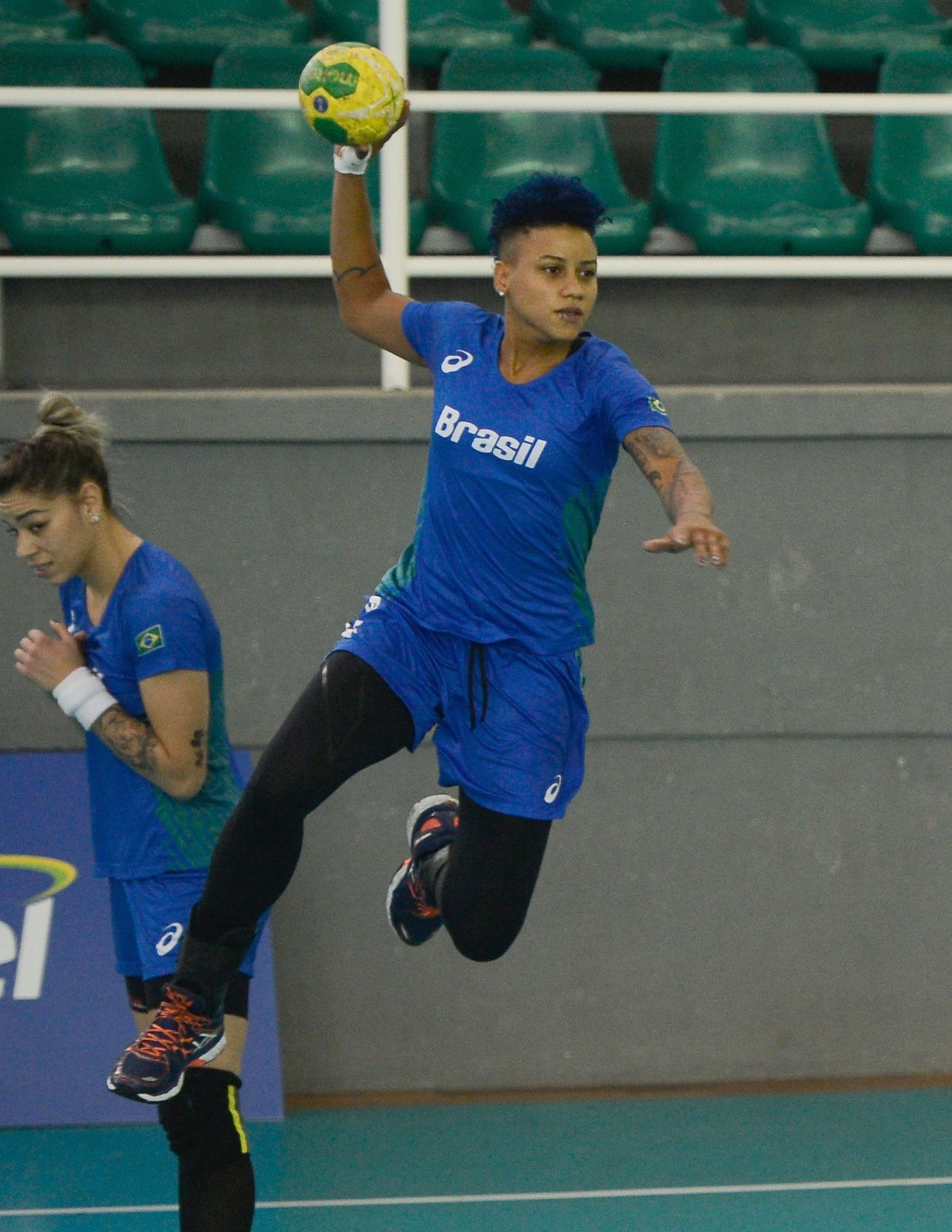
- Samira in 2016

Personal information
- Full name: Samira Pereira da Silva Rocha
- Born: 26 January 1989 (age 37) Recife, Brazil
- Height: 1.70 m (5 ft 7 in)

Sport
- Sport: Handball
- Position: Left wing
- Current club: Kisvárdai KC
- Number: 44

Youth career
- Years: Team
- –: Colégio Decisão
- –: Sport Recife
- –: Clube Portuguese do Recife

Senior clubs
- Years: Team
- 2011–2012: Hypo Niederösterreich
- 2012–2013: Zvezda Zvenigorod
- 2013–2014: Mios Biganos Handball
- 2014–2016: OGC Nice
- 2016–2020: Kisvárdai KC
- 2021-2022: CB Salud
- 2022-2023: SCM Craiova
National team
| Years | Team | Apps | (Gls) |
| 2011-? | Brazil | 121 | (320) |
Medal record
World Championship
| Gold medal – first place | 2013 Serbia |
Pan American Games
| Gold medal – first place | 2011 Guadalajara | Team |
| Gold medal – first place | 2015 Toronto | Team |
Pan American Championship
| Gold medal – first place | 2011 Brazil |
| Gold medal – first place | 2013 Dominican Republic |
| Gold medal – first place | 2015 Cuba |
| Gold medal – first place | 2017 Argentina |

Samira Pereira da Silva Rocha (born 26 January 1989) is a Brazilian handball player for Kisvárdai KC and the Brazilian national team.

She was part of the Brazilian team that won the 2013 World Championship, the first time ever that Brazil won the World Championship. She also participated at the 2011 World Championship in Brazil.

== Career ==
Rocha started playing handball at the age of 14 at Colégio Decisão in Recife. She later played for Sport Recife and Clube Portuguese do Recife. After the 2011 World Championship she moved to Europe to become professional. She chose Austrian Hypo Niederösterreich due to them having many Brazilian players.

In 2012 she signed for Russian Zvezda Zvenigorod together with Alexandra Lacrabère. A year later she signed for French club Mios Biganos Handball, followed by OGC Nice.

After two seasons at Nice she joined Hungarian Kisvárdai KC, where she played until 2020. In the 2021-22 season she joined Spanish CB Salud, followed by SCM Craiova in Romania.

== Achievements ==
- Austrian League:
  - Winner: 2012
- Austrian Cup:
  - Winner: 2012
- Russian Superleague:
  - Bronze Medalist: 2013
- EHF Challenge Cup:
  - Semifinalist: 2014
- World Championship:
  - Winner: 2013
- Pan American Championship:
  - Winner: 2011, 2013, 2015
- Pan American Games
  - Winner:2011, 2015
- South American Championship:
  - Winner: 2013

== Individual awards ==
- All Star Team Left Wing of the Pan American Championship: 2015, 2017
- Top Scorer of the Women's Four Nations: 2016
- MVP of the Pan American Championship: 2017
