= Bruno Santana =

Brazilian handball player (born 1982)

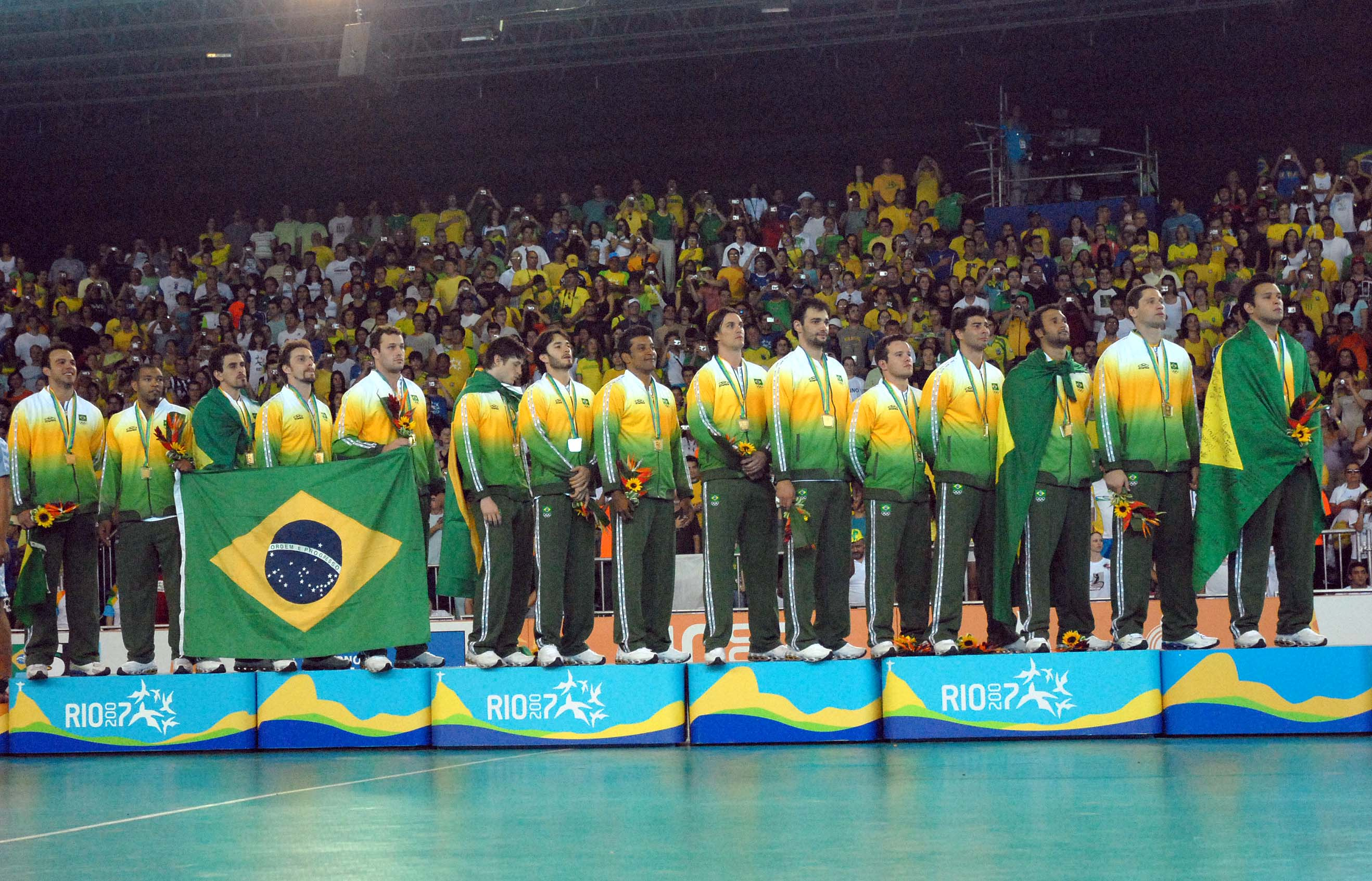
- On the podium after winning gold at the 2007 Pan American Games

Personal information
- Nationality: Brazilian

Sport
- Sport: Handball
National team
- Years: Team
- –: Brazil
Medal record
Pan American Games
Gold medal – first place	2007 Rio de Janeiro	Team
Gold medal – first place	2015 Toronto	Team

Bruno Santana (born 1982) is a Brazilian handball player who plays for the Brazilian national team. He was born in Recife. He participated in the 2004 Summer Olympics, where Brazil placed 10th, and in the 2008 Summer Olympics, where the Brazilian team placed 11th.
