= Leonardo Bortolini =

Brazilian handball player (born 1977)

Léo
Personal information
- Full name: Leonardo Luiz Tezelli Bortolini
- Born: 10 April 1977 (age 49) Campo Mourão, Paraná, Brazil
- Height: 1.85 m (6 ft 1 in)

Sport
- Sport: Handball
Medal record
Men's handball
Representing Brazil
Pan American Games
Silver medal – second place	1999 Winnipeg	Team
Gold medal – first place	2007 Rio de Janeiro	Team
Silver medal – second place	2011 Guadalajara	Team
South American Games
Gold medal – first place	2010 Medellín	Team

Leonardo Luiz Tezelli Bortolini (born 10 April 1977), known as Léo, is a Brazilian handball player who plays for the club Umopar Larrafkl Londrina and the Brazilian national team. He participated at the 2008 Summer Olympics, where the Brazilian team placed 11th.
