= Irina Pop =

Dominican Republic handball player

Personal information
- Nationality: Dominican
- Born: 8 October 1988 (age 38) Cluj-Napoca, Romania
- Height: 1.90 m (6 ft 3 in)

Sport
- Sport: Handball
- Position: Central back
- Current club: Associació Lleidatana d'Handbol (Spain)
National team
Years	Team	Apps
–	Dominican Republic	100
Medal record
Pan American Championship
Bronze medal – third place	2013 Dominican Republic

Irina Alexandra Pop (born 8 October 1988) is a Romanian born Dominican team handball player. She plays for the club Associació Lleidatana d'Handbol (Spain) and on the Dominican Republic national team. She competed at the 2013 World Women's Handball Championship in Serbia, where the Dominican Republic placed 23rd.

== Personal life ==
Pop is 190 cm (6 ft 3 in) tall 77 kilograms (170 lb), born on 8 October 1988 in Cluj-Napoca, Romania.

== Career ==
=== 2011 ===
Pop signed with Feve Gijón to play the 2011/12 Spanish League.

=== 2012 ===
Pop participated in the 2012 Summer Olympic qualifier, but the team finished last in the 3rd qualifier and did not qualify.

=== 2013 ===
Pop led the Dominican Republic national team to the bronze medal-winning 28–19 to Paraguay at the 2013 Pan American Championship, qualifying to the 2013 World Championship, also being chosen the Best Left Back among the tournament's All Star team. She then won the gold medal at the Las Flores tournament in Medellin, Colombia that served as a warm-up for the 2014 Central American and Caribbean Games qualifier. In November she won the silver medal at the 2013 Caribbean Cup also qualifying for the 2014 Central American and Caribbean Games.

Pop participated in the 2013 World Championship held 6–22 December in Serbia, finishing with her team in the 23rd place after defeating 27–26 Australia. At the end of the year, the National Federation selected Pop among the year's best players.

== Individual Achiviements ==
- All star team: Left back:
  - 2013 Pan American Women's Handball Championship
