= Myriam Laplante =

Canadian artist

- Born: 1954 (age 71–72); Chittagong, Bangladesh
- Education: University of Ottawa
- Website: www.myriamlaplante.net

Myriam Laplante (born 1954) is a Canadian artist. Laplante studied visual arts and linguistics at the University of Ottawa.

Her work is included in the collections of the Musée national des beaux-arts du Québec, National Gallery of Canada, the Museum of New Zealand and the Asia Art Archive.
