= 2014 International Tournament of Spain =

Tournament details
- Host country: Spain
- Venue(s): 1 (in 1 host city)
- Dates: 28–30 November
- Teams: 4 (from 3 confederations)

Final positions
- Champions: Brazil (1st title)
- Runner-up: Spain
- Third place: Poland
- Fourth place: Tunisia

Tournament statistics
- Matches played: 6
- Goals scored: 291 (48.5 per match)

The 2014 International Tournament of Spain was the 18th edition of the International Tournament of Spain held in Fuengirola, Spain, between 28 and 30 November as a women's friendly handball tournament organised by the Royal Spanish Handball Federation.

== Results ==
Team	Pld	W	D	L	GF	GA	GD	Pts
Brazil	3	3	0	0	92	65	+27	6
Spain	3	2	0	1	75	62	+13	4
Poland	3	1	0	2	69	67	+2	2
Tunisia	3	0	0	3	55	97	–42	0

== Round robin ==
November 28; 19:00	Tunisia	23 – 35	Brazil	Pabellón Juan Gómez ‘Juanito’, Fuengirola
November 28; 19:00		(10–19)		Pabellón Juan Gómez ‘Juanito’, Fuengirola

November 28; 21:00	Spain	23 – 17	Poland	Pabellón Juan Gómez ‘Juanito’, Fuengirola
November 28; 21:00		(11–7)		Pabellón Juan Gómez ‘Juanito’, Fuengirola

November 29; 16:00	Brazil	33 – 22	Poland	Pabellón Juan Gómez ‘Juanito’, Fuengirola
November 29; 16:00		(11–10)		Pabellón Juan Gómez ‘Juanito’, Fuengirola

November 29; 18:00	Spain	33 – 21	Tunisia	Pabellón Juan Gómez ‘Juanito’, Fuengirola
November 29; 18:00		(17–12)		Pabellón Juan Gómez ‘Juanito’, Fuengirola

November 30; 11:00	Poland	30 – 11	Tunisia	Pabellón Juan Gómez ‘Juanito’, Fuengirola
November 30; 11:00		(15–6)		Pabellón Juan Gómez ‘Juanito’, Fuengirola

November 30; 13:00	Spain	20 – 24	Brazil	Pabellón Juan Gómez ‘Juanito’, Fuengirola
November 30; 13:00		(12–11)		Pabellón Juan Gómez ‘Juanito’, Fuengirola

== Final standing ==
Rank	Team
Gold medal	Brazil
Silver medal	Spain
Bronze medal	Poland
4	Tunisia
