= Suleiky Gómez =

Cuban handball player (born 1984)

Personal information
- Full name: Suleiky Gómez Hernandez
- Nationality: Cuban
- Born: July 21, 1984 (age 42)

Sport
- Sport: Handball
- Current club: PDO Handball Team Salerno

Senior clubs
- Years: Team
- –: Habana
- –: PDO Handball Team Salerno
National team
- Years: Team
- –: Cuba

Suleiky Gómez Hernandez (born 21 July 1984) is a team handball player from Cuba for Italian team PDO Handball Team Salerno. She has played on the Cuba women's national handball team, and participated at the 2011 World Women's Handball Championship in Brazil.
