= Ayling Martínez =

Cuban handball player (born 1983)

Personal information
- Nationality: Cuban
- Born: 4 September 1983 (age 43)
- Height: 1.72 m (5 ft 8 in)

Sport
- Sport: Handball
- Position: Right back

Senior clubs
- Years: Team
- -2016: La Habana
- 2016-2017: Club León Balonmano
National team
Years	Team	Apps	(Gls)
2016-	Cuba	97	(260)
Medal record
Pan American Championship
Silver medal – second place	2015 Cuba
Nor.Ca. Championship
Gold medal – first place	2015 Puerto Rico

Ayling Martínez (born 4 September 1983) is a Cuban handball player. She is member of the Cuban national team. She competed at the 2015 World Women's Handball Championship in Denmark.
