= Fabiana Kuestner =

Brazilian handball player (born 1981)

Fabiana Kuestner Gripa
Personal information
- Born: 17 April 1981 (age 45) Blumenau, Brazil

Sport
- Sport: Handball
National team
- Years: Team
- –: Brazil

Fabiana Kuestner Gripa (born 17 April 1981) is a Brazilian handball player. She was born in Blumenau, Brazil. She competed at the 2004 Summer Olympics, where Brazil placed 7th.
