= 2013 Pan American Women's Handball Championship =

International Handball Competition

2013 Pan American Handball Women's Championships
Tournament details
- Host country: Dominican Republic
- Venue(s): 1 (in 1 host city)
- Dates: 1–8 June
- Teams: 10 (from 1 confederation)

Final positions
- Champions: Brazil (8th title)
- Runners-up: Argentina
- Third place: Dominican Republic
- Fourth place: Paraguay

Tournament statistics
- Matches played: 29
- Goals scored: 1,560 (53.79 per match)
- Top scorer(s): (Brazil) Fernanda da Silva (55 goals)

Awards
- Best player: (Brazil) Alexandra do Nascimento

The 2013 Pan American Women's Handball Championship was the twelfth edition of the Pan American Women's Handball Championship, which took place in the Dominican Republic from 1 to 8 June 2013. It acted as the American qualifying tournament for the 2013 World Women's Handball Championship to be held in Serbia from December 7 to 22. It was organized by the Pan-American Team Handball Federation. This was the second time that this tournament was held in the Dominican Republic after the 2007 Pan American Women's Handball Championship.

== Teams ==
Group A	Group B
Brazil; Dominican Republic; Mexico; United States; Costa Rica	Argentina; Uruguay; Venezuela; Canada; Paraguay

== Preliminary round ==
All times local (UTC−4).

=== Group A ===
Pos	Team	Pld	W	D	L	GF	GA	GD	Pts
1	Brazil	4	4	0	0	188	57	+131	8
2	Dominican Republic (H)	4	3	0	1	115	89	+26	6
3	Mexico	4	2	0	2	109	114	−5	4
4	United States	4	1	0	3	74	114	−40	2
5	Costa Rica	4	0	0	4	51	163	−112	0

(H) Hosts

1 June 2013; 13:00	Mexico	35–16	Costa Rica	Santo Domingo; Referees: Lenci, Grillo (ARG)
1 June 2013; 13:00	Sifuentes 5	(18–7)	Blanco 5	Santo Domingo; Referees: Lenci, Grillo (ARG)
1 June 2013; 13:00	2× (yellow card) 3× (suspension)	Report		Santo Domingo; Referees: Lenci, Grillo (ARG)

1 June 2013; 15:00	Brazil	44–10	United States	Santo Domingo; Referees: Pichon, Reveret (FRA)
1 June 2013; 15:00	da Silva 10	(21–3)	Hesser, Lewis 3	Santo Domingo; Referees: Pichon, Reveret (FRA)
1 June 2013; 15:00	3× (yellow card) 2× (suspension)	Report	2× (yellow card) 1× (suspension)	Santo Domingo; Referees: Pichon, Reveret (FRA)

2 June 2013; 15:15	United States	11–27	Dominican Republic	Santo Domingo; Referees: Marina, Minora (ARG)
2 June 2013; 15:15	Hesser, Darling 2	(6–16)	Pop 7	Santo Domingo; Referees: Marina, Minora (ARG)
2 June 2013; 15:15	3× (yellow card) 3× (suspension)	Report	3× (yellow card)	Santo Domingo; Referees: Marina, Minora (ARG)

2 June 2013; 19:00	Costa Rica	7–59	Brazil	Santo Domingo; Referees: Pérez, Guzmán (PUR)
2 June 2013; 19:00	Fallas 3	(2–31)	da Silva 14	Santo Domingo; Referees: Pérez, Guzmán (PUR)
2 June 2013; 19:00	3× (yellow card) 5× (suspension)	Report	3× (yellow card) 2× (suspension)	Santo Domingo; Referees: Pérez, Guzmán (PUR)

3 June 2013; 17:00	Dominican Republic	27–26	Mexico	Santo Domingo; Referees: Marina, Minore (ARG)
3 June 2013; 17:00	Peña 7	(11–11)	Saavedra 6	Santo Domingo; Referees: Marina, Minore (ARG)
3 June 2013; 17:00	2× (yellow card) 5× (suspension)	Report	2× (yellow card) 1× (suspension)	Santo Domingo; Referees: Marina, Minore (ARG)

3 June 2013; 19:00	United States	30–13	Costa Rica	Santo Domingo; Referees: González, Prieto (URU)
3 June 2013; 19:00	Hesser 9	(14–7)	Fallas 3	Santo Domingo; Referees: González, Prieto (URU)
3 June 2013; 19:00	2× (yellow card) 5× (suspension)	Report	3× (yellow card) 4× (suspension)	Santo Domingo; Referees: González, Prieto (URU)

4 June 2013; 17:00	Costa Rica	15–39	Dominican Republic	Santo Domingo; Referees: Pérez, Guzmán (PUR)
4 June 2013; 17:00	Camacho 4	(7–19)	Peña 7	Santo Domingo; Referees: Pérez, Guzmán (PUR)
4 June 2013; 17:00	3× (yellow card) 6× (suspension) 1× (red card)	Report	1× (yellow card) 1× (suspension)	Santo Domingo; Referees: Pérez, Guzmán (PUR)

4 June 2013; 19:00	Mexico	18–48	Brazil	Santo Domingo; Referees: Lenci, Grillo (ARG)
4 June 2013; 19:00	Navarro 4	(11–24)	da Silva 10	Santo Domingo; Referees: Lenci, Grillo (ARG)
4 June 2013; 19:00	2× (yellow card) 2× (suspension)	Report	3× (yellow card) 1× (suspension)	Santo Domingo; Referees: Lenci, Grillo (ARG)

5 June 2013; 15:00	Mexico	30–23	United States	Santo Domingo; Referees: González, Prieto (URU)
5 June 2013; 15:00	Saavedra 6	(15–13)	Hesser 6	Santo Domingo; Referees: González, Prieto (URU)
5 June 2013; 15:00	3× (yellow card) 5× (suspension)	Report	3× (yellow card) 6× (suspension)	Santo Domingo; Referees: González, Prieto (URU)

5 June 2013; 17:00	Brazil	37–22	Dominican Republic	Santo Domingo; Referees: Pichon, Reveret (FRA)
5 June 2013; 17:00	Rocha, Rodrigues 7	(21–13)	Pop 5	Santo Domingo; Referees: Pichon, Reveret (FRA)
5 June 2013; 17:00	3× (yellow card) 4× (suspension)	Report	3× (yellow card) 3× (suspension)	Santo Domingo; Referees: Pichon, Reveret (FRA)

=== Group B ===
Pos	Team	Pld	W	D	L	GF	GA	GD	Pts
1	Argentina	4	4	0	0	136	63	+73	8
2	Paraguay	4	3	0	1	97	108	−11	6
3	Uruguay	4	2	0	2	109	112	−3	4
4	Venezuela	4	1	0	3	125	136	−11	2
5	Canada	4	0	0	4	89	127	−38	0

1 June 2013; 15:00	Argentina	37–14	Canada	Santo Domingo; Referees: Pérez, Guzmán (PUR)
1 June 2013; 15:00	Decilio 6	(17–6)	Barette 4	Santo Domingo; Referees: Pérez, Guzmán (PUR)
1 June 2013; 15:00	3× (yellow card) 3× (suspension)	Report	2× (yellow card) 3× (suspension)	Santo Domingo; Referees: Pérez, Guzmán (PUR)

1 June 2013; 19:00	Venezuela	30–35	Paraguay	Santo Domingo; Referees: Pinto, Menezes (BRA)
1 June 2013; 19:00	Barinas 9	(13–19)	F. Aluan 14	Santo Domingo; Referees: Pinto, Menezes (BRA)
1 June 2013; 19:00	3× (yellow card) 6× (suspension)	Report	3× (yellow card) 5× (suspension)	Santo Domingo; Referees: Pinto, Menezes (BRA)

2 June 2013; 12:30	Canada	25–31	Uruguay	Santo Domingo
2 June 2013; 12:30		(12–14)		Santo Domingo
2 June 2013; 12:30		Report		Santo Domingo

2 June 2013; 17:00	Paraguay	10–32	Argentina	Santo Domingo; Referees: González, Prieto (URU)
2 June 2013; 17:00	Acuña 7	(5–18)	Decilio 6	Santo Domingo; Referees: González, Prieto (URU)
2 June 2013; 17:00	3× (yellow card)	Report	3× (yellow card) 1× (suspension)	Santo Domingo; Referees: González, Prieto (URU)

3 June 2013; 13:00	Canada	23–28	Paraguay	Santo Domingo; Referees: Pérez, Gusmán (PUR)
3 June 2013; 13:00	Barette 4	(13–16)	F. Aluan 8	Santo Domingo; Referees: Pérez, Gusmán (PUR)
3 June 2013; 13:00	3× (yellow card) 1× (suspension)	Report	3× (yellow card) 2× (suspension)	Santo Domingo; Referees: Pérez, Gusmán (PUR)

3 June 2013; 15:00	Uruguay	36–34	Venezuela	Santo Domingo; Referees: Pinto, Menezes (BRA)
3 June 2013; 15:00	N. Scarrone 11	(19–15)	Barinas 12	Santo Domingo; Referees: Pinto, Menezes (BRA)
3 June 2013; 15:00	3× (yellow card) 7× (suspension)	Report	2× (yellow card) 6× (suspension)	Santo Domingo; Referees: Pinto, Menezes (BRA)

4 June 2013; 13:00	Paraguay	24–23	Uruguay	Santo Domingo; Referees: Pinto, Menezes (BRA)
4 June 2013; 13:00	C. Aluan 10	(11–13)	Fynn 6	Santo Domingo; Referees: Pinto, Menezes (BRA)
4 June 2013; 13:00	3× (yellow card) 4× (suspension)	Report	3× (yellow card) 2× (suspension)	Santo Domingo; Referees: Pinto, Menezes (BRA)

4 June 2013; 15:00	Venezuela	20–38	Argentina	Santo Domingo; Referees: Pichon, Reveret (FRA)
4 June 2013; 15:00	Barinas 6	(9–17)	Decilio 8	Santo Domingo; Referees: Pichon, Reveret (FRA)
4 June 2013; 15:00	2× (yellow card) 7× (suspension)	Report	2× (yellow card) 6× (suspension)	Santo Domingo; Referees: Pichon, Reveret (FRA)

5 June 2013; 13:00	Venezuela	31–27	Canada	Santo Domingo
5 June 2013; 13:00		Report		Santo Domingo

5 June 2013; 19:00	Argentina	29–19	Uruguay	Santo Domingo; Referees: Pérez, Guzmán (PUR)
5 June 2013; 19:00	Mendoza 6	(16–6)	Faedo 5	Santo Domingo; Referees: Pérez, Guzmán (PUR)
5 June 2013; 19:00	2× (yellow card) 5× (suspension)	Report	3× (yellow card) 2× (suspension)	Santo Domingo; Referees: Pérez, Guzmán (PUR)

== Knockout stage ==
=== Ninth place game ===
7 June 2013; 09:00	Costa Rica	13–34	Canada	Santo Domingo; Referees: González, Prieto (URU)
7 June 2013; 09:00	Blanco 5	(6–17)	Laplante 8	Santo Domingo; Referees: González, Prieto (URU)
7 June 2013; 09:00	3× (yellow card) 5× (suspension)	Report	2× (yellow card) 4× (suspension)	Santo Domingo; Referees: González, Prieto (URU)

=== 5–8th place bracket ===
5–8th Semifinals
7 June – Santo Domingo
Mexico	32
Venezuela	25
7 June – Santo Domingo
United States	17
Uruguay	30

Fifth place
8 June – Santo Domingo
Mexico	24
Uruguay	27
Seventh place
8 June – Santo Domingo
Venezuela	36
United States	29

==== 5–8th place Semifinals ====
7 June 2013; 11:00	Mexico	32–25	Venezuela	Santo Domingo; Referees: Pérez, Guzmán (PUR)
7 June 2013; 11:00	Saavedra 8	(11–13)	Barinas 7	Santo Domingo; Referees: Pérez, Guzmán (PUR)
7 June 2013; 11:00	3× (yellow card) 1× (suspension)	Report	3× (yellow card) 5× (suspension)	Santo Domingo; Referees: Pérez, Guzmán (PUR)

7 June 2013; 13:00	Uruguay	30–17	United States	Santo Domingo; Referees: Marina, Minora (ARG)
7 June 2013; 13:00	three players 4	(14–12)	Hesser 5	Santo Domingo; Referees: Marina, Minora (ARG)
7 June 2013; 13:00	1× (yellow card) 1× (suspension)	Report	1× (yellow card) 2× (suspension)	Santo Domingo; Referees: Marina, Minora (ARG)

==== Seventh place game ====
8 June 2013; 12:00	Venezuela	36–29	United States	Santo Domingo; Referees: Pinto, Menezes (BRA)
8 June 2013; 12:00	three players 7	(18–17)	Barinas 11	Santo Domingo; Referees: Pinto, Menezes (BRA)
8 June 2013; 12:00	4× (yellow card) 1× (suspension)	Report	3× (yellow card) 4× (suspension)	Santo Domingo; Referees: Pinto, Menezes (BRA)

==== Fifth place game ====
8 June 2013; 14:00	Mexico	24–27	Uruguay	Santo Domingo; Referees: Lenci, Grillo (ARG)
8 June 2013; 14:00	Iglesias 6	(14–15)	Fynn 6	Santo Domingo; Referees: Lenci, Grillo (ARG)
8 June 2013; 14:00	3× (yellow card) 3× (suspension)	Report	3× (yellow card) 5× (suspension) 1× (red card)	Santo Domingo; Referees: Lenci, Grillo (ARG)

=== Final round ===
Semifinals
7 June – Santo Domingo
Brazil	43
Paraguay	17
7 June – Santo Domingo
Dominican Republic	17
Argentina	27

Final
8 June – Santo Domingo
Brazil	38
Argentina	15
Third place
8 June – Santo Domingo
Paraguay	19
Dominican Republic	28

==== Semifinals ====
7 June 2013; 15:00	Brazil	43–17	Paraguay	Santo Domingo; Referees: Lenci, Grillo (ARG)
7 June 2013; 15:00	da Silva 10	(23–8)	three players 3	Santo Domingo; Referees: Lenci, Grillo (ARG)
7 June 2013; 15:00	3× (yellow card) 1× (suspension)	Report	3× (yellow card)	Santo Domingo; Referees: Lenci, Grillo (ARG)

7 June 2013; 17:00	Argentina	27–17	Dominican Republic	Santo Domingo; Referees: Pinto, Menezes (BRA)
7 June 2013; 17:00	Mendoza 7	(15–10)	Pop 6	Santo Domingo; Referees: Pinto, Menezes (BRA)
7 June 2013; 17:00	3× (yellow card) 4× (suspension)	Report	4× (yellow card) 2× (suspension) 1× (red card)	Santo Domingo; Referees: Pinto, Menezes (BRA)

==== Third place game ====
8 June 2013; 16:00	Paraguay	19–28	Dominican Republic	Santo Domingo
8 June 2013; 16:00		Report		Santo Domingo

==== Final ====
8 June 2013; 18:00	Brazil	38–15	Argentina	Santo Domingo; Referees: Pichon, Reveret (FRA)
8 June 2013; 18:00	do Nascimento 9	(19–8)	Elke 5	Santo Domingo; Referees: Pichon, Reveret (FRA)
8 June 2013; 18:00	2× (yellow card) 3× (suspension)	Report	2× (yellow card) 3× (suspension)	Santo Domingo; Referees: Pichon, Reveret (FRA)

== Final standing ==
Rank	Team
Gold medal	Brazil
Silver medal	Argentina
Bronze medal	Dominican Republic
4	Paraguay
5	Uruguay
6	Mexico
7	Venezuela
8	United States
9	Canada
10	Costa Rica

Team advanced to the 2013 World Women's Handball Championship

== Awards ==
- Best player (Brazil) Alexandra do Nascimento

All-star team

- Goalkeeper (Brazil) Mayssa Pessoa
- Left Wing (Dominican Republic) Nancy Peña
- Left Back (Dominican Republic) Irina Pop
- Playmaker (Brazil) Ana Paula Rodrigues
- Right Back (Argentina) Luciana Mendoza
- Right Wing (Brazil) Alexandra do Nascimento
- Pivot (Argentina) Magdalena Decilio
