= 2009 Pan American Women's Handball Championship =

2009 Pan American Handball Women's Championships
Tournament details
- Host country: Chile
- Venue: 1 (in 1 host city)
- Dates: 23–27 June
- Teams: 7 (from 1 confederation)

Final positions
- Champions: Argentina (1st title)
- Runners-up: Brazil
- Third place: Chile
- Fourth place: Dominican Republic

Tournament statistics
- Matches played: 15
- Goals scored: 749 (49.93 per match)
- Top scorers: Fabiana Aluan (PAR) (34 goals)

The 2009 Pan American Women's Handball Championship was the tenth edition of the Pan American Women's Handball Championship, which took place in Santiago from 23 to 27 June. It acted as the Pan American qualifying tournament for the 2009 World Women's Handball Championship.

== Participating teams ==
- Argentina
- Brazil
- ~~Canada~~
- Chile
- Dominican Republic
- Mexico
- Paraguay
- Uruguay

== Qualification ==
Chile, Mexico, Puerto Rico and the United States played a qualification tournament at Mexico, to determine the last 2 participating nations.

=== Standings ===
Team	Pld	W	D	L	GF	GA	GD	Pts
Mexico	3	3	0	0	84	68	+16	6
Chile	3	2	0	1	95	62	+33	4
Puerto Rico	3	1	0	2	71	94	−23	2
United States	3	0	0	3	64	90	−26	0

22 November 2008; 16:30	Chile	27–17	United States	Mexico City
22 November 2008; 16:30		(15–8)		Mexico City

22 November 2008; 18:30	Mexico	27–20	Puerto Rico	Mexico City
22 November 2008; 18:30		(13–9)		Mexico City

23 November 2008; 16:30	Puerto Rico	32–24	United States	Mexico City
23 November 2008; 16:30		(18–11)		Mexico City

23 November 2008; 18:30	Mexico	26–25	Chile	Mexico City
23 November 2008; 18:30		(13–12)		Mexico City

24 November 2008; 16:30	Chile	43–19	Puerto Rico	Mexico City
24 November 2008; 16:30		(18–6)		Mexico City

24 November 2008; 18:30	Mexico	31–23	United States	Mexico City
24 November 2008; 18:30		(19–9)		Mexico City

=== Semifinals ===
25 November 2008; 16:30	Mexico	33–14	United States	Mexico City
25 November 2008; 16:30		(16–8)		Mexico City

25 November 2008; 18:30	Chile	36–23	Puerto Rico	Mexico City
25 November 2008; 18:30		(17–16)		Mexico City

=== Bronze medal match ===
26 November 2008; 16:30	Puerto Rico	26–21	United States	Mexico City
26 November 2008; 16:30		(9–12)		Mexico City

=== Gold medal match ===
26 November 2008; 18:30	Mexico	22–20	Chile	Mexico City
26 November 2008; 18:30		(12–10)		Mexico City

== Teams ==
Group A	Group B
Brazil; Chile; Mexico; Paraguay	Argentina; Dominican Republic; Uruguay

== Preliminary round ==
All times are local (UTC−3).

=== Group A ===
Team	Pld	W	D	L	GF	GA	GD	Pts
Brazil	3	3	0	0	110	46	+64	6
Chile (H)	3	2	0	1	83	93	−10	4
Mexico	3	1	0	2	58	72	−14	2
Paraguay	3	0	0	3	56	96	−40	0

(H) Hosts

23 June 2009; 15:00	Brazil	30–13	Mexico	Centro de Entrenamiento Olímpico, Santiago
23 June 2009; 15:00		(17–7)		Centro de Entrenamiento Olímpico, Santiago

23 June 2009; 20:15	Chile	34–30	Paraguay	Centro de Entrenamiento Olímpico, Santiago
23 June 2009; 20:15		(17–12)		Centro de Entrenamiento Olímpico, Santiago

24 June 2009; 16:00	Brazil	36–11	Paraguay	Centro de Entrenamiento Olímpico, Santiago
24 June 2009; 16:00		(18–5)		Centro de Entrenamiento Olímpico, Santiago

24 June 2009; 20:00	Chile	27–19	Mexico	Centro de Entrenamiento Olímpico, Santiago
24 June 2009; 20:00		(13–10)		Centro de Entrenamiento Olímpico, Santiago

25 June 2009; 16:00	Mexico	26–15	Paraguay	Centro de Entrenamiento Olímpico, Santiago
25 June 2009; 16:00		(14–7)		Centro de Entrenamiento Olímpico, Santiago

25 June 2009; 20:00	Chile	22–44	Brazil	Centro de Entrenamiento Olímpico, Santiago
25 June 2009; 20:00		(10–25)		Centro de Entrenamiento Olímpico, Santiago

=== Group B ===
Team	Pld	W	D	L	GF	GA	GD	Pts
Argentina	2	2	0	0	53	38	+15	4
Dominican Republic	2	0	1	1	38	45	−7	1
Uruguay	2	0	1	1	42	50	−8	1

23 June 2009; 17:00	Dominican Republic	21–21	Uruguay	Centro de Entrenamiento Olímpico, Santiago
23 June 2009; 17:00		(10–12)		Centro de Entrenamiento Olímpico, Santiago

24 June 2009; 18:00	Argentina	29–21	Uruguay	Centro de Entrenamiento Olímpico, Santiago
24 June 2009; 18:00		(14–7)		Centro de Entrenamiento Olímpico, Santiago

25 June 2009; 18:00	Dominican Republic	17–24	Argentina	Centro de Entrenamiento Olímpico, Santiago
25 June 2009; 18:00		(7–14)		Centro de Entrenamiento Olímpico, Santiago

== Placement round ==
Points from the preliminary round against teams that advanced as well were carried over.

Pos	Team	Pld	W	D	L	GF	GA	GD	Pts
5	Mexico	2	1	1	0	49	37	+12	3
6	Uruguay	2	1	1	0	50	47	+3	3
7	Paraguay	2	0	0	2	39	54	−15	0

Source: Todor66
Rules for classification: 1) points; 2) head-to-head points; 3) head-to-head goal difference; 4) head-to-head number of goals scored; 5) goal difference.

26 June 2009; 16:00	Paraguay	24–28	Uruguay	Centro de Entrenamiento Olímpico, Santiago
26 June 2009; 16:00		(9–14)		Centro de Entrenamiento Olímpico, Santiago

27 June 2009; 15:45	Mexico	23–23	Uruguay	Centro de Entrenamiento Olímpico, Santiago
27 June 2009; 15:45		(10–11)		Centro de Entrenamiento Olímpico, Santiago

== Final round ==
Semifinal
26 June – Santiago
Brazil	38
Dominican Republic	12
26 June – Santiago
Chile	11
Argentina	34

Final
27 June – Santiago
Brazil	25
Argentina	26^{OT}
Third place
27 June – Santiago
Dominican Republic	30
Chile	34^{OT}

=== Semifinals ===
26 June 2009; 18:00	Brazil	38–12	Dominican Republic	Centro de Entrenamiento Olímpico, Santiago
26 June 2009; 18:00		(15–10)		Centro de Entrenamiento Olímpico, Santiago

26 June 2009; 20:00	Chile	11–34	Argentina	Centro de Entrenamiento Olímpico, Santiago
26 June 2009; 20:00		(6–20)		Centro de Entrenamiento Olímpico, Santiago

=== Bronze medal match ===
27 June 2009
17:45
Dominican Republic
30–34 (ET)
Chile
Centro de Entrenamiento Olímpico, Santiago

(11–13)

FT: 23–23 ET: 4–4, 3–7

=== Gold medal match ===
27 June 2009
19:45
Brazil
25–26 (ET)
Argentina
Centro de Entrenamiento Olímpico, Santiago

(9–12)

FT: 23–23 ET: 2–3

== Final standing ==
Rank	Team
Gold medal	Argentina
Silver medal	Brazil
Bronze medal	Chile
4	Dominican Republic
5	Mexico
6	Uruguay
7	Paraguay

Team advanced to the 2009 World Women's Handball Championship

== Best team ==
- Goalkeeper: (Argentina) Valentina Kogan
- Right wing: (Brazil) Alexandra do Nascimento
- Right back: (Paraguay) Fabiana Aluan
- Central back: (Argentina) Silvana Totolo
- Left back: (Dominican Republic) Damaris Bencomo
- Left wing: (Brazil) Fernanda da Silva
- Pivot: (Argentina) Antonela Mena
