= South American Handball Championship =

The South American Handball Championship is the official competition for the men's and women's national handball teams of South America. In addition to crowning the South American champions, the tournament is also a qualifying tournament for the Pan American Handball Championship.

== Men ==
=== Summary ===
Year	Host	Final			Third place match		
Year	Host	Champion	Score	Runner-up	Third place	Score	Fourth place
2001; Details	(Brazil); Maringá	Argentina	No playoffs	Brazil	Chile	No playoffs	Paraguay
2003; Details	(Argentina); Mar del Plata	Brazil	No playoffs	Argentina	Uruguay	No playoffs	Chile

=== Medal table ===
Rank	Nation	Gold	Silver	Bronze	Total
1	Argentina	1	1	0	2
1	Brazil	1	1	0	2
3	Chile	0	0	1	1
3	Uruguay	0	0	1	1
Totals (4 entries)		2	2	2	6

=== Participating nations ===
Nation	(Brazil) 2001	(Argentina) 2003	Years
Argentina	1st	2nd	2
Brazil	2nd	1st	2
Chile	3rd	4th	2
Paraguay	4th	5th	2
Uruguay	5th	3rd	2
Total	5	5	

== Women ==
=== Summary ===
Year	Host	Final			Third place match		
Year	Host	Champion	Score	Runner-up	Third place	Score	Fourth place
1983; Details	(Argentina); Buenos Aires	Brazil	No playoffs	Argentina	Paraguay	No playoffs	Uruguay
1984; Details	(Brazil); Caxias do Sul	Brazil	No playoffs	Argentina	Paraguay	No playoffs	Uruguay
1986; Details	(Brazil); Novo Hamburgo	Brazil	No playoffs	Argentina	Paraguay	No playoffs	Uruguay
1988; Details	(Paraguay); Asunción	Brazil	No playoffs	Argentina	Uruguay	No playoffs	Paraguay
1991; Details	(Brazil); Maringá	Brazil	No playoffs	Argentina	Paraguay	No playoffs	Uruguay
1994; Details	(Paraguay); Asunción	Brazil	No playoffs	Argentina	Uruguay	No playoffs	Paraguay
1998; Details	(Uruguay); Canelones	Brazil	No playoffs	Argentina	Uruguay	No playoffs	Paraguay
2001; Details	(Brazil); São Miguel do Iguaçu	Brazil	40–25	Uruguay	Paraguay	18–12	Argentina
2013; Details	(Argentina); Mar del Plata	Brazil	No playoffs	Argentina	Paraguay	No playoffs	Uruguay

=== Medal table ===
Rank	Nation	Gold	Silver	Bronze	Total
1	Brazil	9	0	0	9
2	Argentina	0	8	0	8
3	Uruguay	0	1	3	4
4	Paraguay	0	0	6	6
Totals (4 entries)		9	9	9	27

=== Participating nations ===
Nation	(Argentina) 1983	(Brazil) 1984	(Brazil) 1986	(Paraguay) 1988	(Brazil) 1991	(Paraguay) 1994	(Uruguay) 1998	(Brazil) 2001	(Argentina) 2013	Years
Argentina	2nd	2nd	2nd	2nd	2nd	2nd	2nd	4th	2nd	9
Brazil	1st	1st	1st	1st	1st	1st	1st	1st	1st	9
Chile	5th	5th	-	5th	-	5th	-	-	5th	5
Paraguay	3rd	3rd	3rd	4th	3rd	4th	4th	3rd	3rd	9
Uruguay	4th	4th	4th	3rd	4th	3rd	3rd	2nd	4th	9
Venezuela	-	-	-	-	-	-	-	-	6th	1
Total	5	5	4	5	4	5	4	4	6	
