= 2011 Pan American Women's Handball Championship =

2011 Pan American Handball Women's Championships
Tournament details
- Host country: Brazil
- Venue(s): 1 (in 1 host city)
- Dates: 28 June – 2 July
- Teams: 8 (from 1 confederation)

Final positions
- Champions: Brazil (7th title)
- Runners-up: Argentina
- Third place: Cuba
- Fourth place: Uruguay

Tournament statistics
- Matches played: 18
- Goals scored: 993 (55.17 per match)
- Attendance: 3,961 (220 per match)

The 2011 Pan American Women's Handball Championship was the eleventh edition of the Pan American Women's Handball Championship, held from 28 June to 2 July 2011, in São Bernardo do Campo, Brazil. The tournament also served as the qualification event for the 2011 World Women's Handball Championship, with the top three teams winning the right to participate on the World Championship. However, since Pan American Championship winners Brazil already qualified as the host nation, fourth placed Uruguay was awarded the third spot, that was reserved for the zone.

== Participating teams ==
- Argentina
- Brazil
- Chile
- Cuba
- Dominican Republic
- Mexico
- Uruguay
- Venezuela

== Qualification ==
Cuba, Venezuela and the United States played a qualification tournament at Havana, Cuba to determine the last 2 participating nations.

=== Standings ===
Team	Pld	W	D	L	GF	GA	GD	Pts
Cuba	2	2	0	0	76	27	+49	4
Venezuela	2	1	0	1	49	57	−8	2
United States	2	0	0	2	31	72	−41	0

3 November 2010; 14:30	Cuba	36–17	Venezuela	Havana
3 November 2010; 14:30		(20–8)		Havana

4 November 2010; 14:30	Cuba	40–10	United States	Havana
4 November 2010; 14:30		(20–5)		Havana

5 November 2010; 14:30	Venezuela	32–21	United States	Havana
5 November 2010; 14:30		(11–8)		Havana

== Teams ==
Group A	Group B
Brazil; Chile; Mexico; Cuba	Argentina; Dominican Republic; Uruguay; Venezuela

== Preliminary round ==
All times are local (UTC−3).

=== Group A ===
Team	Pld	W	D	L	GF	GA	GD	Pts
Brazil (H)	3	3	0	0	104	53	+51	6
Cuba	3	2	0	1	96	73	+23	4
Chile	3	1	0	2	63	99	−36	2
Mexico	3	0	0	3	54	92	−38	0

(H) Hosts

28 June 2011; 16:00	Chile	21–40	Cuba	São Bernardo do Campo; Attendance: 250; Referees: Lenci, Grillo (ARG)
28 June 2011; 16:00	Flores 4	(10–19)	Marenz 12	São Bernardo do Campo; Attendance: 250; Referees: Lenci, Grillo (ARG)
28 June 2011; 16:00	3× (yellow card) 5× (suspension)	Report	3× (yellow card) 1× (suspension)	São Bernardo do Campo; Attendance: 250; Referees: Lenci, Grillo (ARG)

28 June 2011; 20:00	Brazil	31–16	Mexico	São Bernardo do Campo; Attendance: 250; Referees: Perez, Guzman (PUR)
28 June 2011; 20:00	Nascimento 7	(18–6)	Hernandez, Castañon 4	São Bernardo do Campo; Attendance: 250; Referees: Perez, Guzman (PUR)
28 June 2011; 20:00	2× (yellow card) 5× (suspension) 1× (red card)	Report	3× (yellow card) 2× (suspension) 1× (red card)	São Bernardo do Campo; Attendance: 250; Referees: Perez, Guzman (PUR)

29 June 2011; 16:00	Mexico	22–26	Chile	São Bernardo do Campo; Attendance: 155; Referees: De Souza, Paz (BRA)
29 June 2011; 16:00	Chavez 6	(13–10)	Peréz 6	São Bernardo do Campo; Attendance: 155; Referees: De Souza, Paz (BRA)
29 June 2011; 16:00	3× (yellow card) 4× (suspension)	Report	3× (yellow card) 4× (suspension)	São Bernardo do Campo; Attendance: 155; Referees: De Souza, Paz (BRA)

29 June 2011; 20:00	Brazil	36–21	Cuba	São Bernardo do Campo; Attendance: 350; Referees: Bonaventura, Bonaventura (FRA)
29 June 2011; 20:00	Pinheiro 7	(15–10)	Marenz 6	São Bernardo do Campo; Attendance: 350; Referees: Bonaventura, Bonaventura (FRA)
29 June 2011; 20:00	3× (yellow card) 4× (suspension)	Report	3× (yellow card) 6× (suspension) 1× (red card)	São Bernardo do Campo; Attendance: 350; Referees: Bonaventura, Bonaventura (FRA)

30 June 2011; 16:00	Mexico	16–35	Cuba	São Bernardo do Campo; Attendance: 210; Referees: Lenci, Grillo (ARG)
30 June 2011; 16:00	Morales, Morales 3	(6–19)	Valdez, Hernondez 8	São Bernardo do Campo; Attendance: 210; Referees: Lenci, Grillo (ARG)
30 June 2011; 16:00	3× (yellow card) 6× (suspension)	Report	2× (yellow card) 2× (suspension)	São Bernardo do Campo; Attendance: 210; Referees: Lenci, Grillo (ARG)

30 June 2011; 20:00	Brazil	37–16	Chile	São Bernardo do Campo; Attendance: 250; Referees: Gonzalez, Prieto (URU)
30 June 2011; 20:00	Rorigues 8	(18–8)	Garcia 5	São Bernardo do Campo; Attendance: 250; Referees: Gonzalez, Prieto (URU)
30 June 2011; 20:00	3× (yellow card) 1× (suspension)	Report	3× (yellow card) 3× (suspension)	São Bernardo do Campo; Attendance: 250; Referees: Gonzalez, Prieto (URU)

=== Group B ===
Team	Pld	W	D	L	GF	GA	GD	Pts
Argentina	3	3	0	0	105	52	+53	6
Uruguay	3	1	1	1	77	68	+9	3
Dominican Republic	3	1	1	1	72	75	−3	3
Venezuela	3	0	0	3	71	130	−59	0

28 June 2011; 14:00	Dominican Republic	36–22	Venezuela	São Bernardo do Campo; Attendance: 150; Referees: Pinto, Menezes (BRA)
28 June 2011; 14:00	Andino 7	(18–13)	Salcedo 4	São Bernardo do Campo; Attendance: 150; Referees: Pinto, Menezes (BRA)
28 June 2011; 14:00	3× (yellow card) 3× (suspension)	Report	3× (yellow card) 6× (suspension)	São Bernardo do Campo; Attendance: 150; Referees: Pinto, Menezes (BRA)

28 June 2011; 18:00	Argentina	21–14	Uruguay	São Bernardo do Campo; Attendance: 280; Referees: Paz, Souza (BRA)
28 June 2011; 18:00	Decilio 5	(8–7)	Castro 3	São Bernardo do Campo; Attendance: 280; Referees: Paz, Souza (BRA)
28 June 2011; 18:00	3× (yellow card) 6× (suspension)	Report	3× (yellow card) 5× (suspension)	São Bernardo do Campo; Attendance: 280; Referees: Paz, Souza (BRA)

29 June 2011; 14:00	Uruguay	20–20	Dominican Republic	São Bernardo do Campo; Attendance: 150; Referees: De Souza, Paz (BRA)
29 June 2011; 14:00	Castro 7	(11–10)	Peña, Andino 5	São Bernardo do Campo; Attendance: 150; Referees: De Souza, Paz (BRA)
29 June 2011; 14:00	3× (yellow card) 4× (suspension)	Report	3× (yellow card) 3× (suspension)	São Bernardo do Campo; Attendance: 150; Referees: De Souza, Paz (BRA)

29 June 2011; 18:00	Argentina	51–22	Venezuela	São Bernardo do Campo; Attendance: 100; Referees: Perez, Guzman (PUR)
29 June 2011; 18:00	Pizzo 7	(21–10)	Mijares, Riera 4	São Bernardo do Campo; Attendance: 100; Referees: Perez, Guzman (PUR)
29 June 2011; 18:00	3× (yellow card) 1× (suspension)	Report	2× (yellow card) 10× (suspension) 1× (red card)	São Bernardo do Campo; Attendance: 100; Referees: Perez, Guzman (PUR)

30 June 2011; 14:00	Uruguay	43–27	Venezuela	São Bernardo do Campo; Attendance: 150; Referees: Bonaventura, Bonaventura (FRA)
30 June 2011; 14:00	Cherone 12	(14–12)	Mijares, Morales 5	São Bernardo do Campo; Attendance: 150; Referees: Bonaventura, Bonaventura (FRA)
30 June 2011; 14:00	3× (yellow card) 1× (suspension)	Report	2× (yellow card) 3× (suspension)	São Bernardo do Campo; Attendance: 150; Referees: Bonaventura, Bonaventura (FRA)

30 June 2011; 18:00	Argentina	33–16	Dominican Republic	São Bernardo do Campo; Attendance: 150; Referees: Pinto, Menezes (BRA)
30 June 2011; 18:00	Mendoza 7	(14–6)	Andino, Tejada 5	São Bernardo do Campo; Attendance: 150; Referees: Pinto, Menezes (BRA)
30 June 2011; 18:00	3× (yellow card) 5× (suspension)	Report	3× (yellow card) 6× (suspension)	São Bernardo do Campo; Attendance: 150; Referees: Pinto, Menezes (BRA)

== Placement matches ==
=== Seventh place game ===
1 July 2011; 14:00	Mexico	25–23	Venezuela	São Bernardo do Campo; Attendance: 89; Referees: Prieto, Gonzalez (URU)
1 July 2011; 14:00	Morales 6	(12–14)	Marquez 6	São Bernardo do Campo; Attendance: 89; Referees: Prieto, Gonzalez (URU)
1 July 2011; 14:00	3× (yellow card) 3× (suspension)	Report	3× (yellow card) 2× (suspension) 1× (red card)	São Bernardo do Campo; Attendance: 89; Referees: Prieto, Gonzalez (URU)

=== Fifth place game ===
1 July 2011; 16:00	Chile	28–22	Dominican Republic	São Bernardo do Campo; Attendance: 150; Referees: Perez, Guzman (PUR)
1 July 2011; 16:00	Flores 6	(14–12)	Andino 9	São Bernardo do Campo; Attendance: 150; Referees: Perez, Guzman (PUR)
1 July 2011; 16:00	3× (yellow card) 5× (suspension)	Report	3× (yellow card) 2× (suspension)	São Bernardo do Campo; Attendance: 150; Referees: Perez, Guzman (PUR)

== Final round ==
Semifinals
July 1 – São Bernardo do Campo
Brazil	40
Uruguay	14
July 1 – São Bernardo do Campo
Argentina	43 (Pen.)
Cuba	41

Final
July 2 – São Bernardo do Campo
Brazil	35
Argentina	16
Third place
July 2 – São Bernardo do Campo
Uruguay	27
Cuba	37

=== Semifinals ===
1 July 2011
18:00
Argentina
43–41 (ET)
Cuba
São Bernardo do Campo
Attendance: 450
Referees: De Souza, Paz (BRA)
Mendoza 13
(13–13)
Ramires, Duron 10
3× (yellow card) 6× (suspension)
Report
3× (yellow card) 5× (suspension) 1× (red card)

FT: 28–28 ET: 5–5, 5–5 Pen: 5–3

1 July 2011; 20:00	Brazil	40–14	Uruguay	São Bernardo do Campo; Attendance: 200; Referees: Grillo, Lenci (ARG)
1 July 2011; 20:00	do Nascimento 8	(19–3)	Palla 6	São Bernardo do Campo; Attendance: 200; Referees: Grillo, Lenci (ARG)
1 July 2011; 20:00	3× (yellow card) 1× (suspension)	Report	3× (yellow card) 3× (suspension)	São Bernardo do Campo; Attendance: 200; Referees: Grillo, Lenci (ARG)

=== Third place game ===
2 July 2011; 15:00	Cuba	37–27	Uruguay	São Bernardo do Campo
2 July 2011; 15:00		(17–13)		São Bernardo do Campo

=== Gold medal game ===
2 July 2011; 17:00	Argentina	16–35	Brazil	São Bernardo do Campo; Attendance: 627; Referees: Bonaventura, Bonaventura (FRA)
2 July 2011; 17:00	Pizzo, Haro 4	(5–22)	Silva 8	São Bernardo do Campo; Attendance: 627; Referees: Bonaventura, Bonaventura (FRA)
2 July 2011; 17:00	2× (yellow card) 3× (suspension)	Report	2× (yellow card) 1× (suspension)	São Bernardo do Campo; Attendance: 627; Referees: Bonaventura, Bonaventura (FRA)

== Final standing ==
Rank	Team
Gold medal	Brazil
Silver medal	Argentina
Bronze medal	Cuba
4	Uruguay
5	Chile
6	Dominican Republic
7	Mexico
8	Venezuela

Team advanced to the 2011 World Women's Handball Championship
