= ÖHB-Cup (women) =

Austrian handball tournament

Tournament information
- Location: Austria
- Qualifier for: EHF Challenge League
- Most championships: Hypo Niederösterreich (34 titles)
- Website: www.oehb.at

Current champion
- Hypo Niederösterreich (2026)

The ÖHB-Cup Frauen is the women's handball cup of Austria, organized by the Austrian Handball Federation. Hypo Niederösterreich has won 34 out of 36 editions.

The winner qualifies for the EHF Challenge Cup.

== List of seasons ==
Year	Winner	Year	Winner	Year	Winner	Year	Winner
1990	Hypo Niederösterreich	2000	Hypo Niederösterreich	2010	Hypo Niederösterreich	2020	No winner^{2}
1991	Hypo Niederösterreich	2001	Hypo Niederösterreich	2011	Hypo Niederösterreich	2021	Hypo Niederösterreich
1992	Hypo Niederösterreich	2002	Hypo Niederösterreich	2012	Hypo Niederösterreich	2022	Hypo Niederösterreich
1993	Hypo Niederösterreich	2003	Hypo Niederösterreich	2013	Hypo Niederösterreich	2023	Hypo Niederösterreich
1994	Hypo Niederösterreich	2004	Hypo Niederösterreich	2014	Hypo Niederösterreich	2024	Hypo Niederösterreich
1995	Hypo Niederösterreich	2005	Hypo Niederösterreich	2015	Hypo Niederösterreich	2025	Hypo Niederösterreich
1996	Hypo Niederösterreich	2006	Hypo Niederösterreich	2016	Hypo Niederösterreich	2026	Hypo Niederösterreich
1997	Hypo Niederösterreich	2007	Hypo Niederösterreich	2017	MGA Fivers	2027	
1998	Hypo Niederösterreich	2008	Hypo Niederösterreich	2018	UHC Stockerau	2028	
1999	Hypo Niederösterreich	2009	Hypo Niederösterreich	2019	Hypo Niederösterreich	2029	

^{2} Cancelled due to the Covid-19 pandemic.

== List of winners ==
Club	Winners	Winning years
Hypo Niederösterreich	34	1990, 1991, 1992, 1993, 1994, 1995, 1996, 1997, 1998, 1999, 2000, 2001, 2002, 2003, 2004, 2005, 2006, 2007, 2008, 2009, 2010, 2011, 2012, 2013, 2014, 2015, 2016, 2019, 2021, 2022, 2023, 2024, 2025, 2926
MGA Fivers	1	2017
UHC Stockerau	1	2018
