= South American Cadet Handball Championship =

The South American Cadet Handball Championship is the official competition for Under-17 Men's and Women's national handball teams of South America. In addition to crowning the South American champions, the tournament also serves as a qualifying tournament for the Pan American Under-16 Handball Championship.

== Men ==
=== Summary ===
Year	Host	Final			Third place match		
Year	Host	Champion	Score	Runner-up	Third place	Score	Fourth place
2002; Details	(Brazil); Foz do Iguaçu	Argentina	No playoffs	Brazil	Chile	No playoffs	Uruguay
2003; Details	(Brazil); Curitiba	Argentina	20–16	Brazil	Uruguay	22–21	Chile
2004; Details	(Brazil); São José dos Pinhais	Argentina	No playoffs	Brazil	Uruguay	No playoffs	Chile
2012; Details	(Peru); Lima	Argentina	40–30	Venezuela	Brazil	24–22	Chile
2013; Details	(Colombia); Bogotá	Brazil	No playoffs	Argentina	Chile	No playoffs	Uruguay
2014; Details	(Colombia); Palmira	Brazil	27–19	Argentina	Chile	23–15	Colombia
2015; Details	(Paraguay); Asunción	Brazil	27–19	Argentina	Paraguay	30–27	Chile
2016; Details	(Paraguay); Asunción	Argentina	No playoffs	Brazil	Chile	No playoffs	Paraguay
2017; Details	(Paraguay); Asunción	Argentina	No playoffs	Brazil	Paraguay	No playoffs	Chile
2018; Details	(Argentina); Luján de Cuyo	Argentina	No playoffs	Brazil	Chile	No playoffs	Uruguay

=== Medal table ===
Rank	Nation	Gold	Silver	Bronze	Total
1	Argentina	7	3	0	10
2	Brazil	3	6	1	10
3	Venezuela	0	1	0	1
4	Chile	0	0	5	5
5	Paraguay	0	0	2	2
5	Uruguay	0	0	2	2
Totals (6 entries)		10	10	10	30

=== Participating nations ===
Nation	(Brazil) 2002	(Brazil) 2003	(Brazil) 2004	(Peru) 2012	(Colombia) 2013	(Colombia) 2014	(Paraguay) 2015	(Paraguay) 2016	(Paraguay) 2017	(Argentina) 2018	Years
Argentina	1st	1st	1st	1st	2nd	2nd	2nd	1st	1st	1st	10
Brazil	2nd	2nd	2nd	3rd	1st	1st	1st	2nd	2nd	2nd	10
Chile	3rd	4th	4th	4th	3rd	3rd	4th	3rd	4th	3rd	10
Colombia	-	-	-	-	5th	4th	-	-	-	-	2
Ecuador	-	-	-	6th	-	-	6th	-	-	-	2
Paraguay	5th	-	5th	-	-	-	3rd	4th	3rd	5th	6
Peru	-	-	-	7th	6th	6th	7th	6th	-	6th	6
Uruguay	4th	3rd	3rd	5th	4th	5th	5th	5th	5th	4th	9
Venezuela	-	-	-	2nd	-	-	-	-	-	-	1
Total	5	4	5	7	6	6	7	6	5	6	

== Women ==
=== Summary ===
Year	Host	Final			Third place match		
Year	Host	Champion	Score	Runner-up	Third place	Score	Fourth place
2002; Details	(Brazil); Foz do Iguaçu	Brazil	No playoffs	Argentina	Uruguay	No playoffs	Chile
2003; Details	(Brazil); Curitiba	Brazil	No playoffs	Argentina	Uruguay	No playoffs	Paraguay
2004; Details	(Brazil); São José dos Pinhais	Brazil	No playoffs	Argentina	Uruguay	No playoffs	Chile
2012; Details	(Argentina); Río Tercero	Argentina	No playoffs	Uruguay	Brazil	No playoffs	Paraguay
2013; Details	(Chile); Santiago	Argentina	No playoffs	Paraguay	Uruguay	No playoffs	Brazil
2014; Details	(Colombia); Palmira	Paraguay	No playoffs	Argentina	Uruguay	No playoffs	Brazil
2015; Details	(Paraguay); Asunción	Argentina	17–09	Paraguay	Uruguay	22–20	Chile
2016; Details	(Paraguay); Asunción	Brazil	No playoffs	Argentina	Chile	No playoffs	Paraguay
2017; Details	(Paraguay); Asunción	Brazil	No playoffs	Paraguay	Argentina	No playoffs	Chile
2018; Details	(Argentina); Luján de Cuyo	Paraguay	No playoffs	Brazil	Uruguay	No playoffs	Chile

=== Medal table ===
Rank	Nation	Gold	Silver	Bronze	Total
1	Brazil	5	1	1	7
2	Argentina	3	5	1	9
3	Paraguay	2	3	0	5
4	Uruguay	0	1	7	8
5	Chile	0	0	1	1
Totals (5 entries)		10	10	10	30

=== Participating nations ===
Nation	(Brazil) 2002	(Brazil) 2003	(Brazil) 2004	(Argentina) 2012	(Chile) 2013	(Colombia) 2014	(Paraguay) 2015	(Paraguay) 2016	(Paraguay) 2017	(Argentina) 2018	Years
Argentina	2nd	2nd	2nd	1st	1st	2nd	1st	2nd	3rd	5th	10
Brazil	1st	1st	1st	3rd	4th	4th	-	1st	1st	2nd	9
Chile	4th	5th	4th	5th	5th	5th	4th	3rd	4th	4th	10
Colombia	-	-	-	-	-	6th	-	-	-	-	1
Paraguay	5th	4th	5th	4th	2nd	1st	2nd	4th	2nd	1st	10
Peru	-	-	-	-	-	-	-	6th	-	-	1
Uruguay	3rd	3rd	3rd	2nd	3rd	3rd	3rd	5th	5th	3rd	10
Total	5	5	5	5	5	6	4	6	5	5	
