= 2010 Pan American Men's Youth Handball Championship =

2010 Pan American Handball Men's Youth Championship
Tournament details
- Host country: Brazil
- Venue: 1 (in 1 host city)
- Dates: April 13–17
- Teams: 6

Final positions
- Champions: Brazil
- Runners-up: Argentina
- Third place: Chile
- Fourth place: Uruguay

Tournament statistics
- Matches played: 15
- Goals scored: 829 (55.27 per match)

The 2010 American Handball Men's Youth Championships took place in Balneário Camboriú from April 13 – 17. It acts as the Pan American qualifying tournament for the 2010 Summer Youth Olympics.

The Chile men's national handball team placed third in the 2010 Pan-American tournament.

== Results ==
Team	Pld	W	D	L	GF	GA	GD	Pts
Brazil	5	5	0	0	185	94	+91	10
Argentina	5	4	0	1	183	104	+79	8
Chile	5	3	0	2	143	123	+20	6
Uruguay	5	2	0	3	116	156	–40	4
Venezuela	5	1	0	4	131	154	–23	2
Paraguay	5	0	0	5	71	198	–127	0

April 13; 11:45	Argentina	31 – 30	Chile	Ginásio de Esportes Multieventos Hamilton Linhares, Balneário Camboriú

April 13; 15:15	Venezuela	37 – 24	Paraguay	Ginásio de Esportes Multieventos Hamilton Linhares, Balneário Camboriú

April 13; 20:45	Brazil	38 – 21	Uruguay	Ginásio de Esportes Multieventos Hamilton Linhares, Balneário Camboriú
April 13; 20:45		(17-8)		Ginásio de Esportes Multieventos Hamilton Linhares, Balneário Camboriú

April 14; 11:45	Argentina	45 – 8	Paraguay	Ginásio de Esportes Multieventos Hamilton Linhares, Balneário Camboriú

April 14; 15:15	Venezuela	26 – 27	Uruguay	Ginásio de Esportes Multieventos Hamilton Linhares, Balneário Camboriú

April 14; 20:45	Brazil	31 – 15	Chile	Ginásio de Esportes Multieventos Hamilton Linhares, Balneário Camboriú
April 14; 20:45		(14-9)		Ginásio de Esportes Multieventos Hamilton Linhares, Balneário Camboriú

April 15; 11:45	Chile	29 – 12	Paraguay	Ginásio de Esportes Multieventos Hamilton Linhares, Balneário Camboriú

April 15; 15:15	Argentina	41 – 18	Uruguay	Ginásio de Esportes Multieventos Hamilton Linhares, Balneário Camboriú

April 15; 20:45	Brazil	28 – 22	Venezuela	Ginásio de Esportes Multieventos Hamilton Linhares, Balneário Camboriú

April 16; 11:45	Chile	33 – 22	Uruguay	Ginásio de Esportes Multieventos Hamilton Linhares, Balneário Camboriú

April 16; 16:00	Argentina	39 – 19	Venezuela	Ginásio de Esportes Multieventos Hamilton Linhares, Balneário Camboriú

April 16; 20:45	Brazil	59 – 9	Paraguay	Ginásio de Esportes Multieventos Hamilton Linhares, Balneário Camboriú

April 17; 11:45	Paraguay	18 – 28	Uruguay	Ginásio de Esportes Multieventos Hamilton Linhares, Balneário Camboriú

April 17; 15:15	Venezuela	27 – 36	Chile	Ginásio de Esportes Multieventos Hamilton Linhares, Balneário Camboriú

April 17; 20:45	Brazil	29 – 27	Argentina	Ginásio de Esportes Multieventos Hamilton Linhares, Balneário Camboriú

== Final standing ==
Rank	Team
Gold medal	Brazil
Silver medal	Argentina
Bronze medal	Chile
4	Uruguay
5	Venezuela
6	Paraguay

Team advanced to the 2010 Summer Youth Olympics
