= Handball at the 2014 South American Games =

- Venue: Polideportivo Viña
- Dates: March 7-9

The Handball Competitions at the 2014 South American Games took place at the Polideportivo Viña in Viña del Mar, Chile from March 7 to 16. There were two competitions, one each for men and women, each with five national teams competing. Brazil is the defending champion for the men's competition while Argentina is in the women's competitions. The top 3 teams in each tournament qualifies to compete at the 2015 Pan American Games in Toronto, Canada.

== Medal summary ==
Event	Gold	Silver	Bronze
Men	Brazil	Argentina	Chile
Women	Brazil	Argentina	Chile

=== Medal table ===
Rank	Nation	Gold	Silver	Bronze	Total
1	Brazil (BRA)	2	0	0	2
2	Argentina (ARG)	0	2	0	2
3	Chile (CHI)	0	0	2	2
Totals (3 entries)		2	2	2	6

== Men ==
=== Group A ===
Team	Pld	W	D	L	Points
Argentina	2	2	0	0	4
Chile	2	1	0	1	2
Colombia	2	0	0	2	0

8 March 2014	Argentina	26 – 24	Chile	Polideportivo Viña
8 March 2014		Report		Polideportivo Viña

10 March 2014	Chile	31 – 23	Colombia	Polideportivo Viña
10 March 2014		Report		Polideportivo Viña

12 March 2014	Colombia	15 - 39	Argentina	Polideportivo Viña
12 March 2014		Report		Polideportivo Viña

=== Group B ===
Team	Pld	W	D	L	Points
Brazil	3	3	0	0	6
Uruguay	3	2	0	1	4
Venezuela	3	1	0	2	2
Paraguay	3	0	0	3	0

8 March 2014	Brazil	36 – 19	Venezuela	Polideportivo Viña
8 March 2014		Report		Polideportivo Viña

8 March 2014	Uruguay	29 – 20	Paraguay	Polideportivo Viña
8 March 2014		Report		Polideportivo Viña

10 March 2014	Paraguay	17 – 30	Venezuela	Polideportivo Viña
10 March 2014		Report		Polideportivo Viña

10 March 2014	Uruguay	19 – 37	Brazil	Polideportivo Viña
10 March 2014		Report		Polideportivo Viña

12 March 2014	Brazil	41 - 14	Paraguay	Polideportivo Viña
12 March 2014		Report		Polideportivo Viña

12 March 2014	Venezuela	18 - 20	Uruguay	Polideportivo Viña
12 March 2014		Report		Polideportivo Viña

=== Semi-finals ===
14 March 2014	Argentina	23 - 14	Uruguay	Polideportivo Viña

14 March 2014	Chile	22 - 33	Brazil	Polideportivo Viña

=== Bronze-medal match ===
16 March 2014	Uruguay	21 - 27	Chile	Polideportivo Viña

=== Gold-medal match ===
16 March 2014	Argentina	23 - 25	Brazil	Polideportivo Viña

== Women ==
Team	Pld	W	D	L	Points
Brazil	4	3	1	0	7
Argentina	4	3	1	0	7
Chile	4	1	0	3	2
Uruguay	4	1	0	3	2
Paraguay	4	1	0	3	2

7 March 2014	Paraguay	17 – 26	Argentina	Polideportivo Viña
7 March 2014		Report		Polideportivo Viña

7 March 2014	Chile	27 – 33	Uruguay	Polideportivo Viña
7 March 2014		Report		Polideportivo Viña

9 March 2014	Uruguay	24 – 32	Paraguay	Polideportivo Viña
9 March 2014		Report		Polideportivo Viña

9 March 2014	Chile	22 – 36	Brazil	Polideportivo Viña
9 March 2014		Report		Polideportivo Viña

11 March 2014; 17:00	Argentina	25 – 15	Uruguay	Polideportivo Viña
11 March 2014; 17:00		Report		Polideportivo Viña

11 March 2014; 19:00	Brazil	35 – 8	Paraguay	Polideportivo Viña
11 March 2014; 19:00		Report		Polideportivo Viña

13 March 2014	Argentina	23 – 23	Brazil	Polideportivo Viña
13 March 2014		Report		Polideportivo Viña

13 March 2014	Paraguay	17 – 28	Chile	Polideportivo Viña
13 March 2014		Report		Polideportivo Viña

15 March 2014	Uruguay	13 - 39	Brazil	Polideportivo Viña
15 March 2014		Report		Polideportivo Viña

15 March 2014	Chile	17 - 21	Argentina	Polideportivo Viña
15 March 2014		Report		Polideportivo Viña
