= 2017 Pan American Men's Youth Handball Championship =

Tournament details
- Host country: Chile
- Venue(s): 1 (in 1 host city)
- Dates: 15–22 April
- Teams: 11 (from 1 confederation)

Final positions
- Champions: Argentina (8th title)
- Runner-up: Brazil
- Third place: Chile
- Fourth place: Venezuela

Tournament statistics
- Matches played: 35
- Goals scored: 1,845 (52.71 per match)
- Attendance: 8,723 (249 per match)
- Top scorer(s): (Brazil) Guilherme Torriani (Mexico) Israel Bayardo (43 goals)

The 2017 Pan American Men's Youth Handball Championship the XIII edition of this tournament took place in Santiago, Chile from 15 to 22 April 2017. It acts as a qualifying tournament for the 2017 Men's Youth World Handball Championship.

== Participating teams ==
- Argentina
- Brazil
- Canada
- Chile
- Costa Rica
- Mexico
- Paraguay
- Puerto Rico
- United States
- Uruguay
- Venezuela

== Referees ==
Following six referee pairs were selected by the Pan-American Team Handball Federation for the championship:

Referees
| Argentina | Gonzalo Delgado / Rubén Burgos |
| Brazil | Tarsis Kelson de Oliveira / Dnaldo Silva |
| Chile | Marcelo Moraga / Angel Zavalla |

Referees
| Mexico | Juan Coba / Omar Osalde |
| Paraguay | José Galeano / Ángel Franco |
| Uruguay | Cristian Lemes / Mathías Sosa |

== Preliminary round ==
=== Group A ===
| Pos | Team | Pld | W | D | L | GF | GA | GD | Pts |
|---|---|---|---|---|---|---|---|---|---|
| 1 | Argentina | 4 | 4 | 0 | 0 | 147 | 57 | 90 | 8 |
| 2 | Venezuela | 4 | 3 | 0 | 1 | 117 | 108 | 9 | 6 |
| 3 | Uruguay | 4 | 2 | 0 | 2 | 87 | 95 | –8 | 4 |
| 4 | Canada | 4 | 1 | 0 | 3 | 111 | 126 | –15 | 2 |
| 5 | Puerto Rico | 4 | 0 | 0 | 4 | 75 | 151 | –76 | 0 |

| Team qualified to the semi-finals |

All times are local (UTC−03:00).

| April 15; 12:00 | Uruguay | 31–23 | Canada | Centro de Entrenamiento Olímpico, Santiago; Attendance: 150; Referees: Moraga, Zavalla (CHI) |
| April 15; 12:00 | Brugnoli 8 | (17–11) | Labonville 6 | Centro de Entrenamiento Olímpico, Santiago; Attendance: 150; Referees: Moraga, Zavalla (CHI) |
| April 15; 12:00 | 1× (yellow card) 5× (suspension) | Report | 2× (yellow card) 4× (suspension) | Centro de Entrenamiento Olímpico, Santiago; Attendance: 150; Referees: Moraga, Zavalla (CHI) |

| April 15; 16:00 | Argentina | 49–10 | Puerto Rico | Centro de Entrenamiento Olímpico, Santiago; Attendance: 160; Referees: Sosa, Lemes (URU) |
| April 15; 16:00 | Cañete 9 | (21–5) | Rivera 4 | Centro de Entrenamiento Olímpico, Santiago; Attendance: 160; Referees: Sosa, Lemes (URU) |
| April 15; 16:00 | 2× (yellow card) 3× (suspension) | Report | 1× (yellow card) 3× (suspension) | Centro de Entrenamiento Olímpico, Santiago; Attendance: 160; Referees: Sosa, Lemes (URU) |

| April 16; 12:00 | Puerto Rico | 24–41 | Venezuela | Centro de Entrenamiento Olímpico, Santiago; Referees: Moraga, Zavalla (CHI) |
| April 16; 12:00 | Saunders 6 | (11–19) | four players 7 | Centro de Entrenamiento Olímpico, Santiago; Referees: Moraga, Zavalla (CHI) |
| April 16; 12:00 | 2× (yellow card) 11× (suspension) 1× (red card) | Report | 3× (yellow card) 4× (suspension) | Centro de Entrenamiento Olímpico, Santiago; Referees: Moraga, Zavalla (CHI) |

| April 16; 16:00 | Canada | 21–38 | Argentina | Centro de Entrenamiento Olímpico, Santiago; Attendance: 180; Referees: Galeano, Franco (PAR) |
| April 16; 16:00 | Bastille 7 | (6–18) | Gallardo 7 | Centro de Entrenamiento Olímpico, Santiago; Attendance: 180; Referees: Galeano, Franco (PAR) |
| April 16; 16:00 | 2× (suspension) | Report | 1× (yellow card) 5× (suspension) | Centro de Entrenamiento Olímpico, Santiago; Attendance: 180; Referees: Galeano, Franco (PAR) |

| April 17; 12:00 | Puerto Rico | 25–36 | Canada | Centro de Entrenamiento Olímpico, Santiago; Attendance: 100; Referees: Coba, Osalde (MEX) |
| April 17; 12:00 | Saunders 6 | (12–17) | Belanguer 8 | Centro de Entrenamiento Olímpico, Santiago; Attendance: 100; Referees: Coba, Osalde (MEX) |
| April 17; 12:00 | 3× (yellow card) 5× (suspension) | Report | 1× (yellow card) 3× (suspension) | Centro de Entrenamiento Olímpico, Santiago; Attendance: 100; Referees: Coba, Osalde (MEX) |

| April 17; 14:00 | Venezuela | 27–22 | Uruguay | Centro de Entrenamiento Olímpico, Santiago; Attendance: 100; Referees: Burgos, Delgado (ARG) |
| April 17; 14:00 | Lobo 9 | (10–10) | three players 5 | Centro de Entrenamiento Olímpico, Santiago; Attendance: 100; Referees: Burgos, Delgado (ARG) |
| April 17; 14:00 | 1× (yellow card) 5× (suspension) | Report | 2× (yellow card) 6× (suspension) | Centro de Entrenamiento Olímpico, Santiago; Attendance: 100; Referees: Burgos, Delgado (ARG) |

| April 18; 12:00 | Venezuela | 32–31 | Canada | Centro de Entrenamiento Olímpico, Santiago; Attendance: 100; Referees: Franco, Galeano (PAR) |
| April 18; 12:00 | Lobo 9 | (19–13) | Paul-Hus 6 | Centro de Entrenamiento Olímpico, Santiago; Attendance: 100; Referees: Franco, Galeano (PAR) |
| April 18; 12:00 | 6× (suspension) | Report | 1× (yellow card) 3× (suspension) | Centro de Entrenamiento Olímpico, Santiago; Attendance: 100; Referees: Franco, Galeano (PAR) |

| April 18; 18:00 | Uruguay | 9–29 | Argentina | Centro de Entrenamiento Olímpico, Santiago; Attendance: 200; Referees: Oliveira, Silva (BRA) |
| April 18; 18:00 | Brugnoli 4 | (7–12) | Sulak 4 | Centro de Entrenamiento Olímpico, Santiago; Attendance: 200; Referees: Oliveira, Silva (BRA) |
| April 18; 18:00 | 1× (suspension) | Report | 1× (yellow card) 2× (suspension) | Centro de Entrenamiento Olímpico, Santiago; Attendance: 200; Referees: Oliveira, Silva (BRA) |

| April 20; 14:00 | Uruguay | 25–16 | Puerto Rico | Centro de Entrenamiento Olímpico, Santiago; Attendance: 100; Referees: Coba, Osalde (MEX) |
| April 20; 14:00 | Salas 6 | (14–6) | Santiago 4 | Centro de Entrenamiento Olímpico, Santiago; Attendance: 100; Referees: Coba, Osalde (MEX) |
| April 20; 14:00 | 2× (yellow card) 2× (suspension) | Report | 3× (yellow card) 4× (suspension) | Centro de Entrenamiento Olímpico, Santiago; Attendance: 100; Referees: Coba, Osalde (MEX) |

| April 20; 18:00 | Argentina | 31–17 | Venezuela | Centro de Entrenamiento Olímpico, Santiago; Attendance: 300; Referees: Sosa, Lemes (URU) |
| April 20; 18:00 | Arakaki, Aizen 7 | (15–9) | Lobo 6 | Centro de Entrenamiento Olímpico, Santiago; Attendance: 300; Referees: Sosa, Lemes (URU) |
| April 20; 18:00 | 3× (yellow card) 1× (suspension) | Report | 1× (yellow card) 2× (suspension) | Centro de Entrenamiento Olímpico, Santiago; Attendance: 300; Referees: Sosa, Lemes (URU) |

=== Group B ===
| Pos | Team | Pld | W | D | L | GF | GA | GD | Pts |
|---|---|---|---|---|---|---|---|---|---|
| 1 | Brazil | 5 | 5 | 0 | 0 | 219 | 77 | 142 | 10 |
| 2 | Chile | 5 | 4 | 0 | 1 | 178 | 95 | 83 | 8 |
| 3 | Mexico | 5 | 2 | 0 | 3 | 115 | 136 | –21 | 4 |
| 4 | Paraguay | 5 | 2 | 0 | 3 | 133 | 181 | –48 | 4 |
| 5 | United States | 5 | 1 | 1 | 3 | 83 | 174 | –91 | 3 |
| 6 | Costa Rica | 5 | 0 | 1 | 4 | 95 | 160 | –65 | 1 |

| Team qualified to the semi-finals |

| April 15; 14:00 | Paraguay | 35–32 | Costa Rica | Centro de Entrenamiento Olímpico, Santiago; Attendance: 180; Referees: Oliveira, Silva (BRA) |
| April 15; 14:00 | Fiore 10 | (17–12) | Arias 9 | Centro de Entrenamiento Olímpico, Santiago; Attendance: 180; Referees: Oliveira, Silva (BRA) |
| April 15; 14:00 | 4× (yellow card) 6× (suspension) | Report | 2× (yellow card) 3× (suspension) | Centro de Entrenamiento Olímpico, Santiago; Attendance: 180; Referees: Oliveira, Silva (BRA) |

| April 15; 18:00 | Brazil | 33–21 | Mexico | Centro de Entrenamiento Olímpico, Santiago; Attendance: 300; Referees: Galeano, Franco (PAR) |
| April 15; 18:00 | Cândido 8 | (19–9) | Loya, Bayardo 5 | Centro de Entrenamiento Olímpico, Santiago; Attendance: 300; Referees: Galeano, Franco (PAR) |
| April 15; 18:00 | 1× (yellow card) 6× (suspension) | Report | 2× (yellow card) 3× (suspension) | Centro de Entrenamiento Olímpico, Santiago; Attendance: 300; Referees: Galeano, Franco (PAR) |

| April 15; 20:30 | Chile | 38–12 | United States | Centro de Entrenamiento Olímpico, Santiago; Attendance: 600; Referees: Burgos, Delgado (ARG) |
| April 15; 20:30 | Avedaño 6 | (16–11) | Skorupa 4 | Centro de Entrenamiento Olímpico, Santiago; Attendance: 600; Referees: Burgos, Delgado (ARG) |
| April 15; 20:30 | 3× (yellow card) 1× (suspension) | Report | 1× (yellow card) 1× (suspension) | Centro de Entrenamiento Olímpico, Santiago; Attendance: 600; Referees: Burgos, Delgado (ARG) |

| April 16; 14:00 | Costa Rica | 7–40 | Brazil | Centro de Entrenamiento Olímpico, Santiago; Attendance: 250; Referees: Coba, Osalde (MEX) |
| April 16; 14:00 | Marchena, Arias 3 | (4–25) | Monte, Catarino 7 | Centro de Entrenamiento Olímpico, Santiago; Attendance: 250; Referees: Coba, Osalde (MEX) |
| April 16; 14:00 | 4× (suspension) | Report | 1× (yellow card) 1× (suspension) | Centro de Entrenamiento Olímpico, Santiago; Attendance: 250; Referees: Coba, Osalde (MEX) |

| April 16; 18:00 | United States | 17–31 | Paraguay | Centro de Entrenamiento Olímpico, Santiago; Attendance: 303; Referees: Sosa, Lemes (URU) |
| April 16; 18:00 | Dobrani 4 | (7–13) | Fiore 9 | Centro de Entrenamiento Olímpico, Santiago; Attendance: 303; Referees: Sosa, Lemes (URU) |
| April 16; 18:00 | 1× (yellow card) 3× (suspension) | Report | 3× (yellow card) 2× (suspension) 1× (red card) | Centro de Entrenamiento Olímpico, Santiago; Attendance: 303; Referees: Sosa, Lemes (URU) |

| April 16; 20:00 | Mexico | 20–37 | Chile | Centro de Entrenamiento Olímpico, Santiago; Attendance: 300; Referees: Oliveira, Silva (BRA) |
| April 16; 20:00 | Bayardo 9 | (9–14) | Codina, López | Centro de Entrenamiento Olímpico, Santiago; Attendance: 300; Referees: Oliveira, Silva (BRA) |
| April 16; 20:00 | 3× (yellow card) 3× (suspension) 1× (red card) | Report | 3× (yellow card) 7× (suspension) | Centro de Entrenamiento Olímpico, Santiago; Attendance: 300; Referees: Oliveira, Silva (BRA) |

| April 17; 16:00 | Mexico | 24–21 | Costa Rica | Centro de Entrenamiento Olímpico, Santiago; Attendance: 150; Referees: Zavalla, Moraga (CHI) |
| April 17; 16:00 | Martinez 5 | (13–10) | Zuñiga 6 | Centro de Entrenamiento Olímpico, Santiago; Attendance: 150; Referees: Zavalla, Moraga (CHI) |
| April 17; 16:00 | 3× (yellow card) 9× (suspension) | Report | 2× (yellow card) 8× (suspension) | Centro de Entrenamiento Olímpico, Santiago; Attendance: 150; Referees: Zavalla, Moraga (CHI) |

| April 17; 18:00 | Brazil | 60–7 | United States | Centro de Entrenamiento Olímpico, Santiago; Attendance: 150; Referees: Franco, Galeano (PAR) |
| April 17; 18:00 | Santos Jr. 10 | (30–4) | Kennedy 4 | Centro de Entrenamiento Olímpico, Santiago; Attendance: 150; Referees: Franco, Galeano (PAR) |
| April 17; 18:00 | 3× (yellow card) | Report | 1× (yellow card) 5× (suspension) | Centro de Entrenamiento Olímpico, Santiago; Attendance: 150; Referees: Franco, Galeano (PAR) |

| April 17; 20:00 | Chile | 44–25 | Paraguay | Centro de Entrenamiento Olímpico, Santiago; Attendance: 300; Referees: Sosa, Lemes (URU) |
| April 17; 20:00 | Arancibia 6 | (19–9) | Fiore 6 | Centro de Entrenamiento Olímpico, Santiago; Attendance: 300; Referees: Sosa, Lemes (URU) |
| April 17; 20:00 | 3× (yellow card) 7× (suspension) | Report | 3× (yellow card) 2× (suspension) | Centro de Entrenamiento Olímpico, Santiago; Attendance: 300; Referees: Sosa, Lemes (URU) |

| April 18; 14:00 | United States | 23–21 | Mexico | Centro de Entrenamiento Olímpico, Santiago; Attendance: 100; Referees: Brugos, Delgado (ARG) |
| April 18; 14:00 | Kennedy, Skorupa 6 | (8–11) | Bayardo, Marquez 4 | Centro de Entrenamiento Olímpico, Santiago; Attendance: 100; Referees: Brugos, Delgado (ARG) |
| April 18; 14:00 | 3× (yellow card) 5× (suspension) | Report | 1× (yellow card) 3× (suspension) | Centro de Entrenamiento Olímpico, Santiago; Attendance: 100; Referees: Brugos, Delgado (ARG) |

| April 18; 16:00 | Paraguay | 20–59 | Brazil | Centro de Entrenamiento Olímpico, Santiago; Attendance: 150; Referees: Zavalla, Moraga (CHI) |
| April 18; 16:00 | Corvalan, Canata 5 | (7–35) | Torriani 12 | Centro de Entrenamiento Olímpico, Santiago; Attendance: 150; Referees: Zavalla, Moraga (CHI) |
| April 18; 16:00 | 1× (yellow card) 8× (suspension) 1× (red card) | Report | 3× (yellow card) 5× (suspension) | Centro de Entrenamiento Olímpico, Santiago; Attendance: 150; Referees: Zavalla, Moraga (CHI) |

| April 18; 20:00 | Chile | 37–11 | Costa Rica | Centro de Entrenamiento Olímpico, Santiago; Attendance: 230; Referees: Coba, Osalde (MEX) |
| April 18; 20:00 | Andrade 8 | (15–6) | Solano 6 | Centro de Entrenamiento Olímpico, Santiago; Attendance: 230; Referees: Coba, Osalde (MEX) |
| April 18; 20:00 | 3× (yellow card) 5× (suspension) | Report | 1× (yellow card) 2× (suspension) | Centro de Entrenamiento Olímpico, Santiago; Attendance: 230; Referees: Coba, Osalde (MEX) |

| April 20; 12:00 | Paraguay | 22–29 | Mexico | Centro de Entrenamiento Olímpico, Santiago; Attendance: 100; Referees: Oliveira, Silva (BRA) |
| April 20; 12:00 | Cruz 6 | (12–12) | Bayardo 10 | Centro de Entrenamiento Olímpico, Santiago; Attendance: 100; Referees: Oliveira, Silva (BRA) |
| April 20; 12:00 | 4× (yellow card) 7× (suspension) 1× (red card) | Report | 3× (yellow card) 2× (suspension) | Centro de Entrenamiento Olímpico, Santiago; Attendance: 100; Referees: Oliveira, Silva (BRA) |

| April 20; 16:00 | Costa Rica | 24–24 | United States | Centro de Entrenamiento Olímpico, Santiago; Attendance: 100; Referees: Burgos, Delgado (ARG) |
| April 20; 16:00 | Marchena, Brenes 5 | (12–9) | Amitovic, Eriksson 5 | Centro de Entrenamiento Olímpico, Santiago; Attendance: 100; Referees: Burgos, Delgado (ARG) |
| April 20; 16:00 | 2× (yellow card) 2× (suspension) | Report | 1× (yellow card) 4× (suspension) | Centro de Entrenamiento Olímpico, Santiago; Attendance: 100; Referees: Burgos, Delgado (ARG) |

| April 20; 20:00 | Brazil | 27–22 | Chile | Centro de Entrenamiento Olímpico, Santiago; Attendance: 850; Referees: Burgos, Delgado (ARG) |
| April 20; 20:00 | Cândido 9 | (16–13) | Gomez 6 | Centro de Entrenamiento Olímpico, Santiago; Attendance: 850; Referees: Burgos, Delgado (ARG) |
| April 20; 20:00 | 3× (yellow card) 6× (suspension) | Report | 4× (yellow card) 3× (suspension) 1× (red card) | Centro de Entrenamiento Olímpico, Santiago; Attendance: 850; Referees: Burgos, Delgado (ARG) |

== Knockout stage ==
=== Bracket ===
Semifinals
April 21
Argentina | 20
Chile | 12
April 21
Brazil | 42
Venezuela | 16

Final
April 22
Argentina (OT) | 22
Brazil | 21
Third place
April 22
Chile | 35
Venezuela | 20

5–8th place bracket

5–8th place semifinals
April 21
Uruguay | 25
Paraguay | 22
April 21
Canada | 25
Mexico | 28

Fifth place
April 22
Uruguay | 15
Mexico | 25
Seventh place
April 22
Paraguay | 23
Canada | 32

=== 5–8th place semifinals ===
| April 21; 14:00 | Canada | 25–28 | Mexico | Centro de Entrenamiento Olímpico, Santiago; Attendance: 100; Referees: Sosa, Lemes (URU) |
| April 21; 14:00 | Dueck, Belanguer 6 | (11–14) | Loya 14 | Centro de Entrenamiento Olímpico, Santiago; Attendance: 100; Referees: Sosa, Lemes (URU) |
| April 21; 14:00 | 2× (yellow card) 8× (suspension) | Report | 1× (yellow card) 5× (suspension) | Centro de Entrenamiento Olímpico, Santiago; Attendance: 100; Referees: Sosa, Lemes (URU) |

| April 21; 16:00 | Uruguay | 25–22 | Paraguay | Centro de Entrenamiento Olímpico, Santiago; Attendance: 150; Referees: Burgos, Delgado (ARG) |
| April 21; 16:00 | Sagasti, Esteves 6 | (12–12) | Piñanes 8 | Centro de Entrenamiento Olímpico, Santiago; Attendance: 150; Referees: Burgos, Delgado (ARG) |
| April 21; 16:00 | 1× (yellow card) 3× (suspension) | Report | 3× (yellow card) 5× (suspension) 1× (red card) | Centro de Entrenamiento Olímpico, Santiago; Attendance: 150; Referees: Burgos, Delgado (ARG) |

=== Semifinals ===
| April 21; 18:00 | Brazil | 42–16 | Venezuela | Centro de Entrenamiento Olímpico, Santiago; Attendance: 320; Referees: Zavalla, Moraga (CHI) |
| April 21; 18:00 | Cândido 9 | (23–8) | Rojas 5 | Centro de Entrenamiento Olímpico, Santiago; Attendance: 320; Referees: Zavalla, Moraga (CHI) |
| April 21; 18:00 | 2× (yellow card) 3× (suspension) | Report | 2× (yellow card) 4× (suspension) | Centro de Entrenamiento Olímpico, Santiago; Attendance: 320; Referees: Zavalla, Moraga (CHI) |

| April 21; 20:00 | Argentina | 20–12 | Chile | Centro de Entrenamiento Olímpico, Santiago; Attendance: 950; Referees: Oliveira, Silva (BRA) |
| April 21; 20:00 | Aizen 6 | (9–4) | Valenzuela 4 | Centro de Entrenamiento Olímpico, Santiago; Attendance: 950; Referees: Oliveira, Silva (BRA) |
| April 21; 20:00 | 4× (yellow card) 7× (suspension) | Report | 4× (yellow card) 2× (suspension) | Centro de Entrenamiento Olímpico, Santiago; Attendance: 950; Referees: Oliveira, Silva (BRA) |

=== Consolation round ===
| April 21; 12:00 | Puerto Rico | 26–27 | Costa Rica | Centro de Entrenamiento Olímpico, Santiago; Attendance: 100; Referees: Franco, Galeano (PAR) |
| April 21; 12:00 | Rivera 5 | (15–12) | Marchena 8 | Centro de Entrenamiento Olímpico, Santiago; Attendance: 100; Referees: Franco, Galeano (PAR) |
| April 21; 12:00 | 2× (yellow card) 4× (suspension) | Report | 1× (yellow card) 4× (suspension) | Centro de Entrenamiento Olímpico, Santiago; Attendance: 100; Referees: Franco, Galeano (PAR) |

| April 22; 11:00 | Puerto Rico | 25–24 | United States | Centro de Entrenamiento Olímpico, Santiago; Attendance: 100; Referees: Coba, Osalde (MEX) |
| April 22; 11:00 | Saunders 5 | (10–12) | Skorupa 9 | Centro de Entrenamiento Olímpico, Santiago; Attendance: 100; Referees: Coba, Osalde (MEX) |
| April 22; 11:00 | 3× (yellow card) 2× (suspension) | Report | 1× (yellow card) 6× (suspension) 1× (red card) | Centro de Entrenamiento Olímpico, Santiago; Attendance: 100; Referees: Coba, Osalde (MEX) |

=== Seventh place game ===
| April 22; 13:00 | Paraguay | 23–32 | Canada | Centro de Entrenamiento Olímpico, Santiago; Attendance: 100; Referees: Zavalla, Moraga (CHI) |
| April 22; 13:00 | Duarte 5 | (9–16) | Labonville 6 | Centro de Entrenamiento Olímpico, Santiago; Attendance: 100; Referees: Zavalla, Moraga (CHI) |
| April 22; 13:00 | 3× (yellow card) 4× (suspension) | Report | 1× (yellow card) 3× (suspension) | Centro de Entrenamiento Olímpico, Santiago; Attendance: 100; Referees: Zavalla, Moraga (CHI) |

=== Fifth place game ===
| April 22; 15:00 | Uruguay | 15–25 | Mexico | Centro de Entrenamiento Olímpico, Santiago; Attendance: 200; Referees: Burgos, Delgado (ARG) |
| April 22; 15:00 | Echeverry 4 | (7–10) | Bayardo 8 | Centro de Entrenamiento Olímpico, Santiago; Attendance: 200; Referees: Burgos, Delgado (ARG) |
| April 22; 15:00 | 2× (yellow card) 4× (suspension) 1× (red card) | Report | 2× (suspension) | Centro de Entrenamiento Olímpico, Santiago; Attendance: 200; Referees: Burgos, Delgado (ARG) |

=== Third place game ===
| April 22; 17:00 | Chile | 35–20 | Venezuela | Centro de Entrenamiento Olímpico, Santiago; Attendance: 300; Referees: Oliveira, Silva (BRA) |
| April 22; 17:00 | Cabrera 9 | (17–10) | Rojas 8 | Centro de Entrenamiento Olímpico, Santiago; Attendance: 300; Referees: Oliveira, Silva (BRA) |
| April 22; 17:00 | 2× (yellow card) 3× (suspension) | Report | 3× (yellow card) 1× (suspension) | Centro de Entrenamiento Olímpico, Santiago; Attendance: 300; Referees: Oliveira, Silva (BRA) |

=== Final ===
April 22
19:00
Argentina
22–21 (ET)
Brazil
Centro de Entrenamiento Olímpico, Santiago
Attendance: 950
Referees: Sosa, Lemes (URU)
Martinez 5
(8–8)
Torriani 7
1× (yellow card) 2× (suspension)
Report
3× (yellow card)

FT: 16–16 ET: 6–5

== Final standing ==
| Rank | Team |
|---|---|
| Gold medal | Argentina |
| Silver medal | Brazil |
| Bronze medal | Chile |
| 4 | Venezuela |
| 5 | Mexico |
| 6 | Uruguay |
| 7 | Canada |
| 8 | Paraguay |
| 9 | Costa Rica |
| 10 | Puerto Rico |
| 11 | United States |

| Teams qualified to the 2017 Men's Youth World Handball Championship |

== Awards ==
All-star team

- Goalkeeper: (Argentina) Santiago Giovagnola
- Right Wing: (Argentina) Martín Arakaki
- Right Back: (Brazil) Leonardo Comerlatto
- Center Back: (Venezuela) Yericson Monroy
- Left Back: (Brazil) Paulo Cândido
- Left Wing: (Brazil) Guilherme Torriani
- Pivot: (Chile) José Luis López
- MVP: (Brazil) Paulo Cândido
