= Pan American Men's Cadet Handball Championship =

International youth handball competition

The Pan American Men's Cadet Handball Championship is the official competition for Cadet men's national handball teams of Americas.

== Summary ==
Year	Host	Final			Third place match		
Year	Host	Champion	Score	Runner-up	Third place	Score	Fourth place
2005; Details	(Brazil); Brusque	Argentina	No playoffs	Brazil	Chile	No playoffs	Uruguay
2006; Details	(Brazil); Blumenau	Brazil	No playoffs	Argentina	Uruguay	No playoffs	Paraguay
2007; Details	(Brazil); Cascavel	Brazil	35–19	Argentina	Venezuela	22–17	Mexico
2008; Details	(Brazil); Blumenau	Argentina	20–19	Brazil	Uruguay	21–13	Chile

== Medal table ==
Rank	Nation	Gold	Silver	Bronze	Total
1	Argentina	2	2	0	4
1	Brazil	2	2	0	4
3	Uruguay	0	0	2	2
4	Chile	0	0	1	1
4	Venezuela	0	0	1	1
Totals (5 entries)		4	4	4	12

== Participating nations ==
Nation	(Brazil) 2005	(Brazil) 2006	(Brazil) 2007	(Brazil) 2008	Years
Argentina	1st	2nd	2nd	1st	4
Brazil	2nd	1st	1st	2nd	4
Canada	-	6th	-	-	1
Chile	3rd	5th	7th	4th	4
Mexico	-	-	4th	6th	2
Paraguay	5th	4th	6th	7th	4
Uruguay	4th	3rd	5th	3rd	4
Venezuela	-	-	3rd	5th	2
Total	5	6	7	7	
