= 2011 Pan American Men's Youth Handball Championship =

2011 Pan American Handball Men's Youth Championship
Tournament details
- Host country: Venezuela
- Venue(s): 1 (in 1 host city)
- Dates: May 1–5
- Teams: 8

Final positions
- Champions: Argentina
- Runner-up: Brazil
- Third place: Chile
- Fourth place: Venezuela

Tournament statistics
- Matches played: 20
- Goals scored: 1,171 (58.55 per match)

The 2011 American Handball Men's Youth Championships took place in Barquisimeto from May 1 – 5. It acts as the Pan American qualifying tournament for the 2011 Men's Youth World Handball Championship.

== Teams ==
Group A	Group B
Brazil; Colombia; Uruguay; Venezuela	Argentina; Chile; Puerto Rico; United States

== Preliminary round ==
=== Group A ===
Team	Pld	W	D	L	GF	GA	GD	Pts
Brazil	3	3	0	0	107	50	+57	6
Venezuela	3	1	1	1	83	78	+5	3
Uruguay	3	1	1	1	76	76	0	3
Colombia	3	0	0	3	54	116	–62	0

May 1; 15:00	Brazil	40 – 15	Colombia	Domo Bolivariano, Barquisimeto
May 1; 15:00		(22-5)		Domo Bolivariano, Barquisimeto

May 1; 17:00	Venezuela	24 – 24	Uruguay	Domo Bolivariano, Barquisimeto
May 1; 17:00		(17-13)		Domo Bolivariano, Barquisimeto

May 2; 15:00	Colombia	21 – 35	Uruguay	Domo Bolivariano, Barquisimeto
May 2; 15:00		(13-18)		Domo Bolivariano, Barquisimeto

May 2; 17:00	Brazil	36 – 18	Venezuela	Domo Bolivariano, Barquisimeto
May 2; 17:00		(21-9)		Domo Bolivariano, Barquisimeto

May 3; 15:00	Uruguay	17 – 31	Brazil	Domo Bolivariano, Barquisimeto
May 3; 15:00		(10-15)		Domo Bolivariano, Barquisimeto

May 3; 17:00	Venezuela	41 – 18	Colombia	Domo Bolivariano, Barquisimeto
May 3; 17:00		(19-8)		Domo Bolivariano, Barquisimeto

=== Group B ===
Team	Pld	W	D	L	GF	GA	GD	Pts
Argentina	3	3	0	0	138	58	+80	6
Chile	3	2	0	1	107	73	+34	4
Puerto Rico	3	1	0	2	88	113	–25	2
United States	3	0	0	3	56	145	–89	0

May 1; 08:30	Chile	34 – 26	Puerto Rico	Domo Bolivariano, Barquisimeto
May 1; 08:30		(16-14)		Domo Bolivariano, Barquisimeto

May 1; 10:30	Argentina	60 – 08	United States	Domo Bolivariano, Barquisimeto
May 1; 10:30		(28-3)		Domo Bolivariano, Barquisimeto

May 2; 08:30	United States	16 – 45	Chile	Domo Bolivariano, Barquisimeto
May 2; 08:30		(9-28)		Domo Bolivariano, Barquisimeto

May 2; 10:30	Argentina	47 – 22	Puerto Rico	Domo Bolivariano, Barquisimeto
May 2; 10:30		(22-8)		Domo Bolivariano, Barquisimeto

May 3; 08:30	Puerto Rico	40 – 32	United States	Domo Bolivariano, Barquisimeto
May 3; 08:30		(21-14)		Domo Bolivariano, Barquisimeto

May 3; 10:30	Chile	28 – 31	Argentina	Domo Bolivariano, Barquisimeto
May 3; 10:30		(13-15)		Domo Bolivariano, Barquisimeto

== Placement 5th–8th ==
May 4; 08:30	Uruguay	39 – 23	United States	Domo Bolivariano, Barquisimeto
May 4; 08:30		(22-10)		Domo Bolivariano, Barquisimeto

May 4; 10:30	Puerto Rico	36 – 29	Colombia	Domo Bolivariano, Barquisimeto
May 4; 10:30		(18-12)		Domo Bolivariano, Barquisimeto

=== 7th/8th ===
May 5; 08:30	United States	26 – 31	Colombia	Domo Bolivariano, Barquisimeto
May 5; 08:30		(12-14)		Domo Bolivariano, Barquisimeto

=== 5th/6th ===
May 5; 10:30	Uruguay	38 – 23	Puerto Rico	Domo Bolivariano, Barquisimeto
May 5; 10:30		(18-11)		Domo Bolivariano, Barquisimeto

== Final round ==
Semifinal
May 4 – Barquisimeto
Brazil	36
Chile	22
May 4 – Barquisimeto
Venezuela	24
Argentina	36

Final
May 5 – Barquisimeto
Brazil	24
Argentina	25
Third place
May 5 – Barquisimeto
Chile	28
Venezuela	19

=== Semifinals ===
May 4; 15:00	Brazil	36 – 22	Chile	Domo Bolivariano, Barquisimeto
May 4; 15:00		(20-11)		Domo Bolivariano, Barquisimeto

May 4; 17:00	Argentina	36 – 24	Venezuela	Domo Bolivariano, Barquisimeto
May 4; 17:00		(15-11)		Domo Bolivariano, Barquisimeto

=== Bronze medal match ===
May 5; 15:00	Chile	28 – 19	Venezuela	Domo Bolivariano, Barquisimeto
May 5; 15:00		(15-8)		Domo Bolivariano, Barquisimeto

=== Gold medal match ===
May 5; 17:00	Brazil	24 – 25	Argentina	Domo Bolivariano, Barquisimeto
May 5; 17:00		(13-11)		Domo Bolivariano, Barquisimeto

== Final standing ==
Rank	Team
Gold medal	Argentina
Silver medal	Brazil
Bronze medal	Chile
4	Venezuela
5	Uruguay
6	Puerto Rico
7	Colombia
8	United States

Team advanced to the 2011 Men's Youth World Handball Championship
