= 2008 Pan American Men's Youth Handball Championship =

2008 Pan American Handball Men's Youth Championship
Tournament details
- Host country: Venezuela
- Venue(s): 1 (in 1 host city)
- Dates: September 2–6
- Teams: 7

Final positions
- Champions: Argentina
- Runner-up: Brazil
- Third place: Puerto Rico
- Fourth place: Venezuela

Tournament statistics
- Matches played: 15
- Goals scored: 858 (57.2 per match)

The 2008 American Handball Men's Youth Championships took place in Blumenau from September 2 – 6. It acts as the Pan American qualifying tournament for the 2009 Men's Youth World Handball Championship.

== Teams ==
Group A	Group B
Argentina; Chile; Puerto Rico	Brazil; Paraguay; Uruguay; Venezuela

== Preliminary round ==
=== Group A ===
Team	Pld	W	D	L	GF	GA	GD	Pts
Argentina	2	2	0	0	81	58	+23	4
Puerto Rico	2	1	0	1	52	69	–17	2
Chile	2	0	0	2	62	68	–6	3

September 2; 16:00	Argentina	43 – 22	Puerto Rico	Centro Esportivo Bernardo Werner, SESI, Quadra II, Blumenau

September 3; 14:15	Chile	26 – 30	Puerto Rico	Centro Esportivo Bernardo Werner, SESI, Quadra II, Blumenau

September 4; 16:00	Argentina	38 – 36	Chile	Centro Esportivo Bernardo Werner, SESI, Quadra II, Blumenau

=== Group B ===
Team	Pld	W	D	L	GF	GA	GD	Pts
Brazil	3	3	0	0	134	44	+90	6
Venezuela	3	2	0	1	78	77	+1	4
Uruguay	3	1	0	2	63	94	–31	2
Paraguay	3	0	0	3	57	117	–60	0

September 2; 14:15	Uruguay	19 – 25	Venezuela	Centro Esportivo Bernardo Werner, SESI, Quadra II, Blumenau

September 2; 20:00	Brazil	51 – 13	Paraguay	Centro Esportivo Bernardo Werner, SESI, Quadra I, Blumenau
September 2; 20:00		(25-10)		Centro Esportivo Bernardo Werner, SESI, Quadra I, Blumenau

September 3; 16:00	Uruguay	32 – 26	Paraguay	Centro Esportivo Bernardo Werner, SESI, Quadra II, Blumenau

September 3; 19:30	Brazil	40 – 19	Venezuela	Centro Esportivo Bernardo Werner, SESI, Quadra I, Blumenau
September 3; 19:30		(21-10)		Centro Esportivo Bernardo Werner, SESI, Quadra I, Blumenau

September 4; 14:18	Venezuela	34 – 18	Paraguay	Centro Esportivo Bernardo Werner, SESI, Quadra II, Blumenau

September 4; 19:30	Brazil	43 – 12	Uruguay	Centro Esportivo Bernardo Werner, SESI, Quadra I, Blumenau
September 4; 19:30		(21-4)		Centro Esportivo Bernardo Werner, SESI, Quadra I, Blumenau

== Placement 5th–7th ==
September 5; 14:15	Chile	46 – 18	Paraguay	Centro Esportivo Bernardo Werner, SESI, Quadra II, Blumenau

September 6; 14:15	Chile	32 – 30	Uruguay	Centro Esportivo Bernardo Werner, SESI, Quadra II, Blumenau

== Final round ==
Semifinal
September 5 – Blumenau
Argentina	35
Venezuela	20
September 5 – Blumenau
Puerto Rico	17
Brazil	38

Final
September 5 – Blumenau
Argentina	27
Brazil	21
Third place
September 5 – Blumenau
Venezuela	18
Puerto Rico	29

=== Semifinals ===
September 5; 16:00	Argentina	35 – 20	Venezuela	Centro Esportivo Bernardo Werner, SESI, Quadra II, Blumenau
September 5; 16:00		(21-10)		Centro Esportivo Bernardo Werner, SESI, Quadra II, Blumenau

September 5; 19:30	Brazil	38 – 17	Puerto Rico	Centro Esportivo Bernardo Werner, SESI, Quadra I, Blumenau
September 5; 19:30		(18-11)		Centro Esportivo Bernardo Werner, SESI, Quadra I, Blumenau

=== Bronze medal match ===
September 6; 16:00	Venezuela	18 – 29	Puerto Rico	Centro Esportivo Bernardo Werner, SESI, Quadra II, Blumenau

=== Gold medal match ===
September 6; 19:30	Brazil	21 – 27	Argentina	Centro Esportivo Bernardo Werner, SESI, Quadra I, Blumenau
September 6; 19:30		(9-15)		Centro Esportivo Bernardo Werner, SESI, Quadra I, Blumenau

== Final standing ==
Rank	Team
Gold medal	Argentina
Silver medal	Brazil
Bronze medal	Puerto Rico
4	Venezuela
5	Chile
6	Uruguay
7	Paraguay

Team advanced to the 2009 Men's Youth World Handball Championship
