= 2007 Pan American Men's Youth Handball Championship =

2007 Pan American Handball Men's Youth Championship
Tournament details
- Host country: Brazil
- Venue(s): 1 (in 1 host city)
- Dates: September 4–8
- Teams: 6

Final positions
- Champions: Argentina
- Runners-up: Brazil
- Third place: Puerto Rico
- Fourth place: Uruguay

Tournament statistics
- Matches played: 15
- Goals scored: 827 (55.13 per match)

The 2007 American Handball Men's Youth Championships took place in Cascavel from September 4 – 8.

== Results ==
| Team | Pld | W | D | L | GF | GA | GD | Pts |
|---|---|---|---|---|---|---|---|---|
| Argentina | 5 | 5 | 0 | 0 | 186 | 85 | +101 | 10 |
| Brazil | 5 | 4 | 0 | 1 | 201 | 97 | +104 | 8 |
| Puerto Rico | 5 | 2 | 1 | 2 | 133 | 150 | –17 | 5 |
| Uruguay | 5 | 2 | 0 | 3 | 106 | 144 | –38 | 4 |
| Chile | 5 | 1 | 1 | 3 | 103 | 150 | –47 | 3 |
| Paraguay | 5 | 0 | 0 | 5 | 98 | 201 | –103 | 0 |

| September 4; 14:30 | Chile | 27 – 27 | Puerto Rico | Ginásio de Esportes Odilon Reinhardt, NEVA, Cascavel |
| September 4; 14:30 | | (11-15) | | Ginásio de Esportes Odilon Reinhardt, NEVA, Cascavel |

| September 4; 16:15 | Argentina | 47 – 20 | Paraguay | Ginásio de Esportes Odilon Reinhardt, NEVA, Cascavel |
| September 4; 16:15 | | (20-10) | | Ginásio de Esportes Odilon Reinhardt, NEVA, Cascavel |

| September 4; 20:00 | Uruguay | 15 – 41 | Brazil | Ginásio de Esportes Sérgio Mauro Festugatto, Cascavel |
| September 4; 20:00 | | (5-19) | | Ginásio de Esportes Sérgio Mauro Festugatto, Cascavel |

| September 5; 15:00 | Puerto Rico | 30 – 23 | Uruguay | Ginásio de Esportes Odilon Reinhardt, NEVA, Cascavel |
| September 5; 15:00 | | (11-15) | | Ginásio de Esportes Odilon Reinhardt, NEVA, Cascavel |

| September 5; 18:15 | Brazil | 55 – 8 | Paraguay | Ginásio de Esportes Sérgio Mauro Festugatto, Cascavel |
| September 5; 18:15 | | (25-3) | | Ginásio de Esportes Sérgio Mauro Festugatto, Cascavel |

| September 5; 20:00 | Argentina | 43 – 12 | Chile | Ginásio de Esportes Odilon Reinhardt, NEVA, Cascavel |
| September 5; 20:00 | | (20-9) | | Ginásio de Esportes Odilon Reinhardt, NEVA, Cascavel |

| September 6; 15:15 | Argentina | 30 – 15 | Puerto Rico | Ginásio de Esportes Odilon Reinhardt, NEVA, Cascavel |
| September 6; 15:15 | | (15-8) | | Ginásio de Esportes Odilon Reinhardt, NEVA, Cascavel |

| September 6; 18:15 | Brazil | 35 – 20 | Chile | Ginásio de Esportes Sérgio Mauro Festugatto, Cascavel |
| September 6; 18:15 | | (18-11) | | Ginásio de Esportes Sérgio Mauro Festugatto, Cascavel |

| September 6; 20:00 | Uruguay | 32 – 23 | Paraguay | Ginásio de Esportes Odilon Reinhardt, NEVA, Cascavel |
| September 6; 20:00 | | (11-5) | | Ginásio de Esportes Odilon Reinhardt, NEVA, Cascavel |

| September 7; 13:30 | Argentina | 33 – 14 | Uruguay | Ginásio de Esportes Odilon Reinhardt, NEVA, Cascavel |
| September 7; 13:30 | | (12-6) | | Ginásio de Esportes Odilon Reinhardt, NEVA, Cascavel |

| September 7; 18:15 | Puerto Rico | 21 – 46 | Brazil | Ginásio de Esportes Sérgio Mauro Festugatto, Cascavel |
| September 7; 18:15 | | (9-23) | | Ginásio de Esportes Sérgio Mauro Festugatto, Cascavel |

| September 7; 18:30 | Paraguay | 23 – 27 | Chile | Ginásio de Esportes Odilon Reinhardt, NEVA, Cascavel |
| September 7; 18:30 | | (9-12) | | Ginásio de Esportes Odilon Reinhardt, NEVA, Cascavel |

| September 8; 13:30 | Chile | 17 – 22 | Uruguay | Ginásio de Esportes Sérgio Mauro Festugatto, Cascavel |
| September 8; 13:30 | | (9-10) | | Ginásio de Esportes Sérgio Mauro Festugatto, Cascavel |

| September 8; 16:15 | Paraguay | 24 – 40 | Puerto Rico | Ginásio de Esportes Odilon Reinhardt, NEVA, Cascavel |
| September 8; 16:15 | | (17-20) | | Ginásio de Esportes Odilon Reinhardt, NEVA, Cascavel |

| September 8; 20:00 | Brazil | 24 – 33 | Argentina | Ginásio de Esportes Sérgio Mauro Festugatto, Cascavel |
| September 8; 20:00 | | (11-15) | | Ginásio de Esportes Sérgio Mauro Festugatto, Cascavel |

== Final standing ==
| Rank | Team |
|---|---|
| Gold medal | Argentina |
| Silver medal | Brazil |
| Bronze medal | Puerto Rico |
| 4 | Uruguay |
| 5 | Chile |
| 6 | Paraguay |
