= 2006 Pan American Men's Youth Handball Championship =

2006 Pan American Handball Men's Youth Championship
Tournament details
- Host country: Brazil
- Venue: 1 (in 1 host city)
- Dates: August 29–September 2
- Teams: 7

Final positions
- Champions: Argentina
- Runners-up: Brazil
- Third place: Chile
- Fourth place: Uruguay

Tournament statistics
- Matches played: 15
- Goals scored: 738 (49.2 per match)

The 2006 American Handball Men's Youth Championships took place in Blumenau from August 29 – September 2. It acts as the Pan American qualifying tournament for the 2007 Men's Youth World Handball Championship.

== Teams ==
Group A	Group B
Brazil; Chile; Paraguay	Argentina; Dominican Republic; Mexico; Uruguay

== Preliminary round ==
=== Group A ===
Team	Pld	W	D	L	GF	GA	GD	Pts
Brazil	2	2	0	0	88	32	+56	4
Chile	2	1	0	1	49	47	+2	2
Paraguay	2	0	0	2	28	86	–58	0

August 29; 20:45	Brazil	55 – 14	Paraguay	Centro Esportivo Bernardo Werner, Blumenau
August 29; 20:45		(28–7)		Centro Esportivo Bernardo Werner, Blumenau

August 30; 15:15	Chile	31 – 14	Paraguay	Centro Esportivo Bernardo Werner, Blumenau
August 30; 15:15		(14–6)		Centro Esportivo Bernardo Werner, Blumenau

August 31; 18:45	Brazil	33 – 18	Chile	Centro Esportivo Bernardo Werner, Blumenau
August 31; 18:45		(16–9)		Centro Esportivo Bernardo Werner, Blumenau

=== Group B ===
Team	Pld	W	D	L	GF	GA	GD	Pts
Argentina	3	3	0	0	122	37	+85	6
Uruguay	3	1	1	1	60	75	–15	3
Dominican Republic	3	1	1	2	56	88	–32	3
Mexico	3	0	0	3	56	94	–38	0

August 29; 14:45	Uruguay	27 – 23	Mexico	Centro Esportivo Bernardo Werner, Blumenau
August 29; 14:45		(13–8)		Centro Esportivo Bernardo Werner, Blumenau

August 29; 16:30	Argentina	48 – 11	Dominican Republic	Centro Esportivo Bernardo Werner, Blumenau
August 29; 16:30		(20–5)		Centro Esportivo Bernardo Werner, Blumenau

August 30; 17:00	Uruguay	19 – 19	Dominican Republic	Centro Esportivo Bernardo Werner, Blumenau
August 30; 17:00		(7–8)		Centro Esportivo Bernardo Werner, Blumenau

August 30; 18:45	Argentina	41 – 12	Mexico	Centro Esportivo Bernardo Werner, Blumenau
August 30; 18:45		(20–6)		Centro Esportivo Bernardo Werner, Blumenau

August 31; 15:15	Dominican Republic	26 – 21	Mexico	Centro Esportivo Bernardo Werner, Blumenau
August 31; 15:15		(19–9)		Centro Esportivo Bernardo Werner, Blumenau

August 31; 17:00	Argentina	33 – 14	Uruguay	Centro Esportivo Bernardo Werner, Blumenau
August 31; 17:00		(21–5)		Centro Esportivo Bernardo Werner, Blumenau

== Placement 5th–7th ==
September 1; 16:45	Paraguay	19 – 28	Mexico	Centro Esportivo Bernardo Werner, Blumenau
September 1; 16:45		(7–16)		Centro Esportivo Bernardo Werner, Blumenau

September 2; 15:00	Dominican Republic	29 – 18	Mexico	Centro Esportivo Bernardo Werner, Blumenau
September 2; 15:00		(10–10)		Centro Esportivo Bernardo Werner, Blumenau

== Final round ==
Semifinal
September 1 – Blumenau
Brazil	32
Uruguay	11
September 1 – Blumenau
Chile	15
Argentina	31

Final
September 2 – Blumenau
Brazil	25
Argentina	26
Third place
September 2 – Blumenau
Uruguay	16
Chile	29

=== Semifinals ===
September 1; 17:00	Argentina	31 – 15	Chile	Centro Esportivo Bernardo Werner, Blumenau
September 1; 17:00		(17–4)		Centro Esportivo Bernardo Werner, Blumenau

September 1; 18:45	Brazil	32 – 11	Uruguay	Centro Esportivo Bernardo Werner, Blumenau
September 1; 18:45		(16–6)		Centro Esportivo Bernardo Werner, Blumenau

=== Bronze medal match ===
September 2; 15:15	Chile	29 – 16	Uruguay	Centro Esportivo Bernardo Werner, Blumenau
September 2; 15:15		(12–7)		Centro Esportivo Bernardo Werner, Blumenau

=== Gold medal match ===
September 2; 18:45	Argentina	26 – 25	Brazil	Centro Esportivo Bernardo Werner, Blumenau
September 2; 18:45		(16–10)		Centro Esportivo Bernardo Werner, Blumenau

== Final standing ==
Rank	Team
Gold medal	Argentina
Silver medal	Brazil
Bronze medal	Chile
4	Uruguay
5	Dominican Republic
6	Mexico
7	Paraguay

Team advanced to the 2007 Men's Youth World Handball Championship
