= 2003 Pan American Men's Youth Handball Championship =

2003 Pan American Handball Men's Youth Championship
Tournament details
- Host country: Brazil
- Venue(s): 1 (in 1 host city)
- Dates: September 24–28
- Teams: 7

Final positions
- Champions: Brazil
- Runner-up: Argentina
- Third place: Chile
- Fourth place: Uruguay

Tournament statistics
- Matches played: 15
- Goals scored: 732 (48.8 per match)

The 2003 American Handball Men's Youth Championships took place in São José dos Pinhais and Curitiba from September 24 – 28.

== Teams ==
Group A	Group B
Brazil; Greenland; Uruguay	Argentina; Canada; Chile; Paraguay

== Preliminary round ==
=== Group A ===
Team	Pld	W	D	L	GF	GA	GD	Pts
Brazil	2	2	0	0	70	34	+36	4
Uruguay	2	1	0	1	44	54	–10	2
Greenland	2	0	0	2	35	61	–26	0

September 24; 20:15	Brazil	38 – 13	Greenland	Ginásio Ney Braga, São José dos Pinhais
September 24; 20:15		(20–2)		Ginásio Ney Braga, São José dos Pinhais

September 25; 15:00	Uruguay	23 – 22	Greenland	Ginásio Ney Braga, São José dos Pinhais
September 25; 15:00		(14–11)		Ginásio Ney Braga, São José dos Pinhais

September 26; 15:00	Brazil	32 – 21	Uruguay	Ginásio Nelson Almir de Almeida, Curitiba
September 26; 15:00		(14–8)		Ginásio Nelson Almir de Almeida, Curitiba

=== Group B ===
Team	Pld	W	D	L	GF	GA	GD	Pts
Argentina	3	3	0	0	103	41	+62	6
Chile	3	2	0	1	72	53	+19	3
Canada	3	1	0	2	45	81	–36	3
Paraguay	3	0	0	3	49	94	–45	0

September 24; 10:30	Chile	24 – 19	Paraguay	Ginásio Ney Braga, São José dos Pinhais
September 24; 10:30		(14–10)		Ginásio Ney Braga, São José dos Pinhais

September 24; 14:30	Argentina	33 – 11	Canada	Ginásio Nelson Almir de Almeida, Curitiba
September 24; 14:30		(14–7)		Ginásio Nelson Almir de Almeida, Curitiba

September 25; 12:00	Chile	29 – 8	Canada	Ginásio Ney Braga, São José dos Pinhais
September 25; 12:00		(13–4)		Ginásio Ney Braga, São José dos Pinhais

September 25; 13:30	Argentina	44 – 11	Paraguay	Ginásio Nelson Almir de Almeida, Curitiba
September 25; 13:30		(19–4)		Ginásio Nelson Almir de Almeida, Curitiba

September 26; 13:30	Canada	26 – 19	Paraguay	Ginásio Ney Braga, São José dos Pinhais
September 26; 13:30		(14–11)		Ginásio Ney Braga, São José dos Pinhais

September 26; 16:30	Argentina	26 – 19	Chile	Ginásio Ney Braga, São José dos Pinhais
September 26; 16:30		(11–8)		Ginásio Ney Braga, São José dos Pinhais

== Placement 5th–7th ==
September 27; 19:30	Greenland	32 – 20	Paraguay	Ginásio Nelson Almir de Almeida, Curitiba
September 27; 19:30		(12–9)		Ginásio Nelson Almir de Almeida, Curitiba

September 28; 15:00	Canada	21 – 28	Greenland	Ginásio Nelson Almir de Almeida, Curitiba
September 28; 15:00		(9–12)		Ginásio Nelson Almir de Almeida, Curitiba

== Final round ==
Semifinal
September 27 – São José dos Pinhais
Brazil	34
Chile	17
September 27 – Curitiba
Uruguay	24
Argentina	30

Final
September 28 – São José dos Pinhais
Brazil	31
Argentina	29
Third place
September 28 – Curitiba
Chile	27
Uruguay	21

=== Semifinals ===
September 27; 18:00	Argentina	30 – 24	Uruguay	Ginásio Nelson Almir de Almeida, Curitiba
September 27; 18:00		(15–11)		Ginásio Nelson Almir de Almeida, Curitiba

September 27; 19:30	Brazil	34 – 17	Chile	Ginásio Ney Braga, São José dos Pinhais
September 27; 19:30		(18–10)		Ginásio Ney Braga, São José dos Pinhais

=== Bronze medal match ===
September 28; 13:30	Chile	27 – 21	Uruguay	Ginásio Nelson Almir de Almeida, Curitiba
September 28; 13:30		(10–12)		Ginásio Nelson Almir de Almeida, Curitiba

=== Gold medal match ===
September 28; 16:30	Brazil	31 – 29	Argentina	Ginásio Ney Braga, São José dos Pinhais
September 28; 16:30		(14–14)		Ginásio Ney Braga, São José dos Pinhais

== Final standing ==
Rank	Team
Gold medal	Brazil
Silver medal	Argentina
Bronze medal	Chile
4	Uruguay
5	Greenland
6	Canada
7	Paraguay
