= 2005 Pan American Men's Youth Handball Championship =

2005 Pan American Handball Men's Youth Championship
Tournament details
- Host country: Brazil
- Venue: 1 (in 1 host city)
- Dates: September 6–10
- Teams: 7

Final positions
- Champions: Argentina
- Runners-up: Brazil
- Third place: Greenland
- Fourth place: Mexico

Tournament statistics
- Matches played: 15
- Goals scored: 784 (52.27 per match)

The 2005 American Handball Men's Youth Championships took place in Brusque from September 6–10.

== Teams ==
| Group A | Group B |
|---|---|
| Brazil; Chile; Mexico | Argentina; Greenland; Paraguay; Uruguay |

== Preliminary round ==
=== Group A ===
| Team | Pld | W | D | L | GF | GA | GD | Pts |
|---|---|---|---|---|---|---|---|---|
| Brazil | 2 | 2 | 0 | 0 | 59 | 36 | +23 | 4 |
| Mexico | 2 | 1 | 0 | 1 | 41 | 50 | –9 | 2 |
| Chile | 2 | 0 | 0 | 2 | 41 | 55 | –14 | 0 |

| September 6; 19:45 | Brazil | 27 – 18 | Mexico | Arena Multiuso, Brusque |
| September 6; 19:45 | | (15–10) | | Arena Multiuso, Brusque |

| September 7; 19:15 | Brazil | 32 – 18 | Chile | Arena Multiuso, Brusque |
| September 7; 19:15 | | (16–9) | | Arena Multiuso, Brusque |

| September 8; 19:15 | Chile | 23 – 23 | Mexico | Ginásio Arthur Scholosser, Brusque |
| September 8; 19:15 | | (10–8) | | Ginásio Arthur Scholosser, Brusque |

=== Group B ===
| Team | Pld | W | D | L | GF | GA | GD | Pts |
|---|---|---|---|---|---|---|---|---|
| Argentina | 3 | 3 | 0 | 0 | 124 | 42 | +82 | 6 |
| Greenland | 3 | 2 | 0 | 1 | 94 | 77 | +17 | 3 |
| Uruguay | 3 | 1 | 0 | 2 | 47 | 92 | –45 | 3 |
| Paraguay | 3 | 0 | 0 | 3 | 59 | 113 | –54 | 0 |

| September 6; 15:45 | Uruguay | 17 – 40 | Greenland | Ginásio Arthur Scholosser, Brusque |
| September 6; 15:45 | | (9–19) | | Ginásio Arthur Scholosser, Brusque |

| September 6; 17:30 | Argentina | 52 – 19 | Paraguay | Ginásio Arthur Scholosser, Brusque |
| September 6; 17:30 | | (26–8) | | Ginásio Arthur Scholosser, Brusque |

| September 7; 15:45 | Argentina | 36 – 17 | Greenland | Ginásio Arthur Scholosser, Brusque |
| September 7; 15:45 | | (18–8) | | Ginásio Arthur Scholosser, Brusque |

| September 7; 17:00 | Uruguay | 24 – 16 | Paraguay | Ginásio Arthur Scholosser, Brusque |
| September 7; 17:00 | | (14–5) | | Ginásio Arthur Scholosser, Brusque |

| September 8; 12:45 | Argentina | 36 – 6 | Uruguay | Arena Multiuso, Brusque |
| September 8; 12:45 | | (13–3) | | Arena Multiuso, Brusque |

| September 8; 15:45 | Greenland | 37 – 24 | Paraguay | Arena Multiuso, Brusque |
| September 8; 15:45 | | (18–10) | | Arena Multiuso, Brusque |

== Placement 5th–7th ==
| September 9; 17:30 | Chile | 47 – 20 | Paraguay | Ginásio Arthur Scholosser, Brusque |
| September 9; 17:30 | | (24–6) | | Ginásio Arthur Scholosser, Brusque |

| September 10; 14:30 | Chile | 32 – 14 | Uruguay | Ginásio Arthur Scholosser, Brusque |
| September 10; 14:30 | | (6–9) | | Ginásio Arthur Scholosser, Brusque |

== Final round ==
Semifinal
September 1 – Blumenau
Brazil | 32
Greenland | 27
September 1 – Blumenau
Mexico | 18
Argentina | 23

Final
September 2 – Blumenau
Brazil | 29
Argentina | 30
Third place
September 2 – Blumenau
Greenland | 28
Mexico | 19

=== Semifinals ===
| September 9; 12:45 | Argentina | 23 – 18 | Mexico | Arena Multiuso, Brusque |
| September 9; 12:45 | | (11–7) | | Arena Multiuso, Brusque |

| September 9; 17:30 | Brazil | 32 – 27 | Greenland | Arena Multiuso, Brusque |
| September 9; 17:30 | | (17–13) | | Arena Multiuso, Brusque |

=== Bronze medal match ===
| September 10; 10:45 | Greenland | 28 – 19 | Mexico | Arena Multiuso, Brusque |
| September 10; 10:45 | | (16–7) | | Arena Multiuso, Brusque |

=== Gold medal match ===
| September 10; 15:45 | Brazil | 29 – 30 OT | Argentina | Arena Multiuso, Brusque |
| September 10; 15:45 | | (16–11:25–25) | | Arena Multiuso, Brusque |

== Final standing ==
| Rank | Team |
|---|---|
| Gold medal | Argentina |
| Silver medal | Brazil |
| Bronze medal | Greenland |
| 4 | Mexico |
| 5 | Chile |
| 6 | Uruguay |
| 7 | Paraguay |
