= Guillermo Fischer =

Argentine handball player

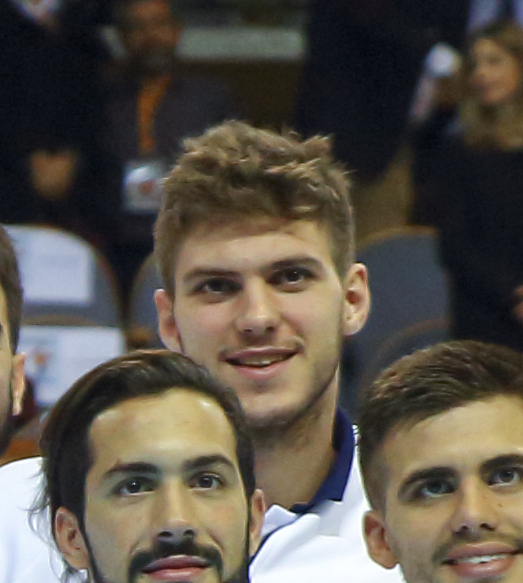
- Fischer in 2018

Personal information
- Full name: Guillermo José Fischer
- Nationality: Argentine
- Born: 18 July 1996 (age 30)
- Height: 2.00 m (6 ft 7 in)

Sport
- Sport: Handball
- Position: Left back
- Current club: SD Teucro
- Number: 18
National team
Years	Team	Apps	(Gls)
–	Argentina	22	(25)
Medal record
Pan American Games
Gold medal – first place	2019 Lima	Team
South and Central American Championship
Gold medal – first place	2026 Paraguay
Silver medal – second place	2022 Brazil
Pan American Junior Championship
Silver medal – second place	2017 Paraguay
Pan American Youth Championship
Silver medal – second place	2015 Venezuela

Guillermo José Fischer (born 18 July 1996) is an Argentine handball player who plays for SD Teucro and the Argentine national team.

He represented Argentina at the 2019 World Men's Handball Championship.
