= 2015 Pan American Men's Youth Handball Championship =

Tournament details
- Host country: Venezuela
- Venue(s): 1 (in 1 host city)
- Dates: 21–25 April
- Teams: 6 (from 1 confederation)

Final positions
- Champions: Brazil (5th title)
- Runner-up: Argentina
- Third place: Chile
- Fourth place: Venezuela

Tournament statistics
- Matches played: 15
- Goals scored: 937 (62.47 per match)
- Top scorer(s): Guilherme Torriani (BRA) (36 goals)

The 2015 Pan American Men's Youth Handball Championship took place in San Cristobal from 21 to 25 April. It acts as the Pan American qualifying tournament for the 2015 Men's Youth World Handball Championship.

== Results ==
Team	Pld	W	D	L	GF	GA	GD	Pts
Brazil	5	5	0	0	258	81	+177	10
Argentina	5	4	0	1	157	98	+59	8
Chile	5	3	0	2	146	126	+20	6
Venezuela	5	2	0	3	159	184	–25	4
Colombia	5	1	0	4	133	169	–36	2
Ecuador	5	0	0	5	84	279	–195	0

== Round robin ==
April 21; 13:30	Argentina	19 – 15	Chile	Gimnasio Campeones de los Andes 2005, San Cristobal; Referees: Oliveira, Vilela (BRA)
April 21; 13:30	Bono 8	(10–10)	Riquelme, Porta 4	Gimnasio Campeones de los Andes 2005, San Cristobal; Referees: Oliveira, Vilela (BRA)
April 21; 13:30	3× (yellow card) 2× (suspension)	Report	3× (yellow card) 4× (suspension) 1× (red card)	Gimnasio Campeones de los Andes 2005, San Cristobal; Referees: Oliveira, Vilela (BRA)

April 21; 15:00	Brazil	87 – 11	Ecuador	Gimnasio Campeones de los Andes 2005, San Cristobal; Referees: Morales, Rojas (VEN)
April 21; 15:00	Torriani 14	(44–4)	Arcentales 5	Gimnasio Campeones de los Andes 2005, San Cristobal; Referees: Morales, Rojas (VEN)
April 21; 15:00	1× (suspension)	Report	4× (yellow card) 2× (suspension)	Gimnasio Campeones de los Andes 2005, San Cristobal; Referees: Morales, Rojas (VEN)

April 21; 16:30	Venezuela	37 – 34	Colombia	Gimnasio Campeones de los Andes 2005, San Cristobal; Referees: Rosemberg, Patiño (ARG)
April 21; 16:30	Enock 7	(16–16)	Yepes 7	Gimnasio Campeones de los Andes 2005, San Cristobal; Referees: Rosemberg, Patiño (ARG)
April 21; 16:30	3× (yellow card) 4× (suspension)	Report	3× (yellow card) 5× (suspension)	Gimnasio Campeones de los Andes 2005, San Cristobal; Referees: Rosemberg, Patiño (ARG)

April 22; 13:00	Chile	18 – 37	Brazil	Gimnasio Campeones de los Andes 2005, San Cristobal; Referees: Scarrone, Diaz (URU)
April 22; 13:00	Paulsen 3	(10–19)	three players 5	Gimnasio Campeones de los Andes 2005, San Cristobal; Referees: Scarrone, Diaz (URU)
April 22; 13:00	2× (yellow card) 6× (suspension) 1× (red card)	Report	3× (yellow card) 3× (suspension)	Gimnasio Campeones de los Andes 2005, San Cristobal; Referees: Scarrone, Diaz (URU)

April 22; 15:00	Colombia	21 – 34	Argentina	Gimnasio Campeones de los Andes 2005, San Cristobal; Referees: Osalde, Coba (MEX)
April 22; 15:00	six players 3	(14–26)	Bono 10	Gimnasio Campeones de los Andes 2005, San Cristobal; Referees: Osalde, Coba (MEX)
April 22; 15:00	2× (yellow card) 6× (suspension)	Report	3× (yellow card) 5× (suspension)	Gimnasio Campeones de los Andes 2005, San Cristobal; Referees: Osalde, Coba (MEX)

April 22; 16:30	Ecuador	23 – 58	Venezuela	Gimnasio Campeones de los Andes 2005, San Cristobal; Referees: Ojeda, Zapata (COL)
April 22; 16:30	Bueno, Caicedo 5	(8–28)	Enock, Perez 9	Gimnasio Campeones de los Andes 2005, San Cristobal; Referees: Ojeda, Zapata (COL)
April 22; 16:30	2× (yellow card) 4× (suspension)	Report	3× (yellow card) 3× (suspension)	Gimnasio Campeones de los Andes 2005, San Cristobal; Referees: Ojeda, Zapata (COL)

April 23; 13:30	Chile	35 – 25	Colombia	Gimnasio Campeones de los Andes 2005, San Cristobal; Referees: Osalde, Coba (MEX)
April 23; 13:30	Carrasco 7	(15–15)	Ramirez 7	Gimnasio Campeones de los Andes 2005, San Cristobal; Referees: Osalde, Coba (MEX)
April 23; 13:30	2× (yellow card) 4× (suspension)	Report	2× (yellow card) 5× (suspension)	Gimnasio Campeones de los Andes 2005, San Cristobal; Referees: Osalde, Coba (MEX)

April 23; 15:00	Argentina	52 – 10	Ecuador	Gimnasio Campeones de los Andes 2005, San Cristobal; Referees: Jaramillo, Riascos (COL)
April 23; 15:00	Bustamante 12	(25–4)	Arcentales 5	Gimnasio Campeones de los Andes 2005, San Cristobal; Referees: Jaramillo, Riascos (COL)
April 23; 15:00	2× (yellow card) 3× (suspension)	Report	2× (yellow card) 5× (suspension)	Gimnasio Campeones de los Andes 2005, San Cristobal; Referees: Jaramillo, Riascos (COL)

April 23; 16:30	Brazil	59 – 19	Venezuela	Gimnasio Campeones de los Andes 2005, San Cristobal; Referees: Ojeda, Zapata (COL)
April 23; 16:30	Torriani 10	(29–8)	Enock, Moreno 4	Gimnasio Campeones de los Andes 2005, San Cristobal; Referees: Ojeda, Zapata (COL)
April 23; 16:30	3× (yellow card) 3× (suspension)	Report	2× (yellow card) 6× (suspension)	Gimnasio Campeones de los Andes 2005, San Cristobal; Referees: Ojeda, Zapata (COL)

April 24; 13:30	Ecuador	22 – 42	Chile	Gimnasio Campeones de los Andes 2005, San Cristobal; Referees: Jaramillo, Riascos (COL)
April 24; 13:30	Vera, Campos 5	(11–17)	Benavides 7	Gimnasio Campeones de los Andes 2005, San Cristobal; Referees: Jaramillo, Riascos (COL)
April 24; 13:30	3× (yellow card) 6× (suspension)	Report	2× (yellow card) 5× (suspension)	Gimnasio Campeones de los Andes 2005, San Cristobal; Referees: Jaramillo, Riascos (COL)

April 24; 15:00	Brazil	45 – 13	Colombia	Gimnasio Campeones de los Andes 2005, San Cristobal; Referees: Morales, Rojas (VEN)
April 24; 15:00	Torriani 7	(25–7)	Arias 4	Gimnasio Campeones de los Andes 2005, San Cristobal; Referees: Morales, Rojas (VEN)
April 24; 15:00	2× (yellow card)	Report	2× (yellow card) 2× (suspension)	Gimnasio Campeones de los Andes 2005, San Cristobal; Referees: Morales, Rojas (VEN)

April 24; 16:30	Venezuela	22 – 32	Argentina	Gimnasio Campeones de los Andes 2005, San Cristobal; Referees: Oliveira, Vilela (BRA)
April 24; 16:30	Moreno 4	(11–17)	Bono, Werner 7	Gimnasio Campeones de los Andes 2005, San Cristobal; Referees: Oliveira, Vilela (BRA)
April 24; 16:30	3× (yellow card) 7× (suspension)	Report	3× (yellow card) 5× (suspension)	Gimnasio Campeones de los Andes 2005, San Cristobal; Referees: Oliveira, Vilela (BRA)

April 25; 13:30	Colombia	40 – 18	Ecuador	Gimnasio Campeones de los Andes 2005, San Cristobal; Referees: Scarrone, Diaz (URU)
April 25; 13:30	Meneses 10	(20–10)	Pantaleon 6	Gimnasio Campeones de los Andes 2005, San Cristobal; Referees: Scarrone, Diaz (URU)
April 25; 13:30	2× (yellow card) 2× (suspension)	Report	3× (yellow card) 2× (suspension) 1× (red card)	Gimnasio Campeones de los Andes 2005, San Cristobal; Referees: Scarrone, Diaz (URU)

April 25; 15:00	Venezuela	23 – 36	Chile	Gimnasio Campeones de los Andes 2005, San Cristobal; Referees: Rosemberg, Patiño (ARG)
April 25; 15:00	Rojas, Goitia 4	(8–20)	Benavides, Hernnandez 8	Gimnasio Campeones de los Andes 2005, San Cristobal; Referees: Rosemberg, Patiño (ARG)
April 25; 15:00	3× (yellow card) 6× (suspension)	Report	3× (yellow card) 5× (suspension)	Gimnasio Campeones de los Andes 2005, San Cristobal; Referees: Rosemberg, Patiño (ARG)

April 25; 16:30	Argentina	20 – 30	Brazil	Gimnasio Campeones de los Andes 2005, San Cristobal; Referees: Ojeda, Zapata (COL)
April 25; 16:30	Werner 8	(8–18)	Ceretta 6	Gimnasio Campeones de los Andes 2005, San Cristobal; Referees: Ojeda, Zapata (COL)
April 25; 16:30	3× (yellow card) 5× (suspension)	Report	2× (yellow card) 9× (suspension)	Gimnasio Campeones de los Andes 2005, San Cristobal; Referees: Ojeda, Zapata (COL)

== Final standing ==
Rank	Team
Gold medal	Brazil
Silver medal	Argentina
Bronze medal	Chile
4	Venezuela
5	Colombia
6	Ecuador

Team qualified to the 2015 Men's Youth World Handball Championship
