= Aaron Codina =

Chilean handball player (born 1999)

Personal information
- Full name: Aaron Alexander Codina Vivanco
- Born: 19 February 1999 (age 27) Maipú, Chile
- Height: 1.93 m (6 ft 4 in)

Sport
- Sport: Handball
- Position: Left back
- Current club: Junior Fasano

Senior clubs
- Years: Team
- 2016–2019: Liceo de Maipú
- 2019–2021: Fenix Toulouse
- 2021–2022: Córdoba BM
- 2022–2024: Polisportiva Cingoli
- 2024-2025: Handball Sassari
- 2025-: Junior Fasano
National team
| Years | Team | Apps | (Gls) |
| – | Chile | 33 | (63) |
Medal record
Pan American Games
| Bronze medal – third place | 2023 Santiago | Team |
Pan American Championship
| Bronze medal – third place | 2018 Greenland |
South and Central American Championship
| Bronze medal – third place | 2022 Brazil |
| Bronze medal – third place | 2024 Argentina |
South American Games
| Silver medal – second place | 2022 Asunción | Team |
| Bronze medal – third place | 2018 Cochabamba | Team |
Bolivarian Games
| Gold medal – first place | 2017 Santa Marta | Team |
| Gold medal – first place | 2022 Valledupar | Team |
Junior Pan American Games
| Bronze medal – third place | 2021 Cali | Team |
Pan American Junior Championship
| Bronze medal – third place | 2017 Paraguay |
SoCa. Junior Championship
| Bronze medal – third place | 2019 Colombia |
Pan American Youth Championship
| Bronze medal – third place | 2017 Chile |

Aaron Alexanther Codina Vivanco (born 19 February 1999) is a Chilean handball player for Junior Fasano and the Chilean national team.

He participated at the 2019 World Men's Handball Championship and at the 2021 World Men's Handball Championship
