= Gabriel Ceretta =

Brazilian handball player (born 1997)

Personal information
- Full name: Gabriel Ceretta Jung
- Nationality: Brazilian
- Born: 12 June 1997 (age 29)
- Height: 1.97 m (6 ft 5 1/2 in)

Sport
- Sport: Handball
- Position: Right back
- Current club: Handebol Caçador/ACHb
- Number: 19
National team
Years	Team	Apps	(Gls)
–	Brazil	3	(6)
Medal record
Pan American Junior Championship
Gold medal – first place	2015 Brazil
Gold medal – first place	2017 Paraguay
Pan American Youth Championship
Gold medal – first place	2015 Venezuela

Gabriel Ceretta Jung (born 12 June 1997) is a Brazilian handball player for Handebol Caçador/ACHb and the Brazilian national team.

He participated at the 2017 World Men's Handball Championship.
