= Handball at the 2010 South American Games =

- Venue: Coliseo Unidad Deportiva Ditaires Itagüi
- Dates: March 20–30

Handball at the 2010 South American Games in Medellín was held from March 20 to March 30. All games were played at Coliseo Unidad Deportiva Ditaires Itagüi.

== Medal summary ==
=== Medal table ===
Rank	Nation	Gold	Silver	Bronze	Total
1	Argentina (ARG)	1	1	0	2
1	Brazil (BRA)	1	1	0	2
3	Chile (CHI)	0	0	1	1
3	Uruguay (URU)	0	0	1	1
Totals (4 entries)		2	2	2	6

== Men ==
Team	Pld	W	D	L	Points
Brazil	4	4	0	0	12
Argentina	4	3	0	1	9
Chile	4	1	1	2	4
Uruguay	4	1	1	2	4
Colombia	4	0	0	4	0

26-03-2010	Uruguay	22–38	Argentina	Coliseo Unidad Deportiva Ditaires Itagüi

26-03-2010	Colombia	20–40	Brazil	Coliseo Unidad Deportiva Ditaires Itagüi

27-03-2010	Uruguay	18–39	Brazil	Coliseo Unidad Deportiva Ditaires Itagüi

27-03-2010	Chile	24–28	Argentina	Coliseo Unidad Deportiva Ditaires Itagüi

28-03-2010	Uruguay	24–24	Chile	Coliseo Unidad Deportiva Ditaires Itagüi

28-03-2010	Argentina	39–18	Colombia	Coliseo Unidad Deportiva Ditaires Itagüi

29-03-2010	Chile	23–38	Brazil	Coliseo Unidad Deportiva Ditaires Itagüi

29-03-2010	Colombia	25–33	Uruguay	Coliseo Unidad Deportiva Ditaires Itagüi

30-03-2010	Colombia	25–37	Chile	Coliseo Unidad Deportiva Ditaires Itagüi

30-03-2010	Argentina	28–30	Brazil	Coliseo Unidad Deportiva Ditaires Itagüi

== Women ==
Team	Pld	W	D	L	Points
Argentina	5	5	0	0	15
Brazil	5	4	0	1	12
Uruguay	5	3	0	2	9
Chile	5	2	0	3	6
Paraguay	5	1	0	4	3
Colombia	5	0	0	5	0

20-03-2010	Argentina	37–27	Chile	Coliseo Unidad Deportiva Ditaires Itagüi

20-03-2010	Brazil	37–17	Uruguay	Coliseo Unidad Deportiva Ditaires Itagüi

20-03-2010	Paraguay	36–16	Colombia	Coliseo Unidad Deportiva Ditaires Itagüi

21-03-2010	Uruguay	25–20	Paraguay	Coliseo Unidad Deportiva Ditaires Itagüi

21-03-2010	Chile	19–42	Brazil	Coliseo Unidad Deportiva Ditaires Itagüi

21-03-2010	Colombia	11–49	Argentina	Coliseo Unidad Deportiva Ditaires Itagüi

22-03-2010	Brazil	41–20	Paraguay	Coliseo Unidad Deportiva Ditaires Itagüi

22-03-2010	Argentina	31–21	Uruguay	Coliseo Unidad Deportiva Ditaires Itagüi

22-03-2010	Colombia	15–42	Chile	Coliseo Unidad Deportiva Ditaires Itagüi

23-03-2010	Uruguay	28–24	Chile	Coliseo Unidad Deportiva Ditaires Itagüi

23-03-2010	Paraguay	17–32	Argentina	Coliseo Unidad Deportiva Ditaires Itagüi

23-03-2010	Colombia	11–56	Brazil	Coliseo Unidad Deportiva Ditaires Itagüi

24-03-2010	Chile	40–19	Paraguay	Coliseo Unidad Deportiva Ditaires Itagüi

24-03-2010	Colombia	16–39	Uruguay	Coliseo Unidad Deportiva Ditaires Itagüi

24-03-2010	Argentina	22–19	Brazil	Coliseo Unidad Deportiva Ditaires Itagüi
