= 2009 Pan American Men's Junior Handball Championship =

Tournament details
- Host country: Argentina
- Venue(s): 1 (in 1 host city)
- Dates: April 14–18
- Teams: 6

Final positions
- Champions: Argentina
- Runners-up: Brazil
- Third place: Greenland
- Fourth place: Chile

Tournament statistics
- Matches played: 15
- Goals scored: 851 (56.73 per match)
- Top scorer(s): Erwin Feuchtmann (CHI) (40 goals)

Awards
- Best player: Diego Simonet (ARG)

The 2009 Pan American Men's Junior Handball Championship took place in Buenos Aires from April 14 – April 18. It acts as the American qualifying tournament for the 2009 Men's Junior World Handball Championship.

== Results ==
Team	Pld	W	D	L	GF	GA	GD	Pts
Argentina	5	5	0	0	163	81	+82	10
Brazil	5	4	0	1	173	114	+59	8
Greenland	5	3	0	2	145	153	-8	6
Chile	5	2	0	3	147	149	–2	4
Uruguay	5	1	0	4	103	158	–55	2
Mexico	5	0	0	5	120	196	–76	0

April 14; 15:00	Chile	35 – 26	Mexico	Buenos Aires
April 14; 15:00		(16–12)		Buenos Aires

April 14; 17:00	Brazil	36 – 29	Greenland	Buenos Aires
April 14; 17:00		(14–14)		Buenos Aires

April 14; 19:00	Argentina	31 – 12	Uruguay	Buenos Aires
April 14; 19:00		(16–3)		Buenos Aires

April 15; 15:00	Uruguay	14 – 37	Brazil	Buenos Aires
April 15; 15:00		(5–13)		Buenos Aires

April 15; 17:00	Greenland	28 – 27	Chile	Buenos Aires
April 15; 17:00		(14–14)		Buenos Aires

April 15; 19:30	Mexico	17 – 47	Argentina	Buenos Aires
April 15; 19:30		(9–25)		Buenos Aires

April 16; 14:00	Uruguay	23 – 22	Mexico	Buenos Aires
April 16; 14:00		(11–11)		Buenos Aires

April 16; 16:00	Brazil	36 – 26	Chile	Buenos Aires
April 16; 16:00		(19–15)		Buenos Aires

April 16; 18:00	Argentina	31 – 14	Greenland	Buenos Aires
April 16; 18:00		(17–8)		Buenos Aires

April 17; 14:00	Greenland	33 – 28	Uruguay	Buenos Aires
April 17; 14:00		(20–13)		Buenos Aires

April 17; 16:00	Brazil	50 – 24	Mexico	Buenos Aires
April 17; 16:00		(25–15)		Buenos Aires

April 17; 18:00	Chile	24 – 33	Argentina	Buenos Aires
April 17; 18:00		(10–17)		Buenos Aires

April 18; 15:00	Mexico	31 – 41	Greenland	Buenos Aires
April 18; 15:00		(11–22)		Buenos Aires

April 18; 17:00	Chile	35 – 26	Uruguay	Buenos Aires
April 18; 17:00		(18–15)		Buenos Aires

April 18; 19:00	Argentina	21 – 14	Brazil	Buenos Aires
April 18; 19:00		(11–7)		Buenos Aires

== Final standing ==
Rank	Team
Gold medal	Argentina
Silver medal	Brazil
Bronze medal	Greenland
4	Chile
5	Uruguay
6	Mexico

Team advanced to the 2009 Men's Junior World Handball Championship
