= Guilherme Torriani =

Brazilian handball player (born 1999)

Personal information
- Full name: Guilherme Miguel Torriani
- Born: 6 February 1999 (age 27) Arujá, Brazil
- Height: 1.86 m (6 ft 1 in)

Sport
- Sport: Handball
- Position: Left wing
- Current club: Fraikin BM. Granollers
National team
Years	Team	Apps	(Gls)
–	Brazil	5	(2)
Medal record
South and Central American Championship
Gold medal – first place	2022 Brazil
Gold medal – first place	2024 Argentina
Silver medal – second place	2026 Paraguay
Pan American Junior Championship
Gold medal – first place	2017 Paraguay
South and Central American Junior Championship
Silver medal – second place	2019 Colombia
Pan American Youth Championship
Gold medal – first place	2015 Venezuela
Silver medal – second place	2017 Chile

Guilherme Miguel Torriani (born 6 February 1999) is a Brazilian handball player for Fraikin BM. Granollers and the Brazilian national team.

He participated at the 2017 World Men's Handball Championship. He competed at the 2020 Summer Olympics.

== Club titles ==
- 2022 South and Central American Men's Club Handball Championship
- 2024 South and Central American Men's Club Handball Championship

== Individual awards and achievements ==
- 2015 Pan American Men's Youth Handball Championship: Top Scorer
- 2017 Pan American Men's Youth Handball Championship: Top Scorer and All Star Team Left Wing
- 2019 South and Central American Men's Junior Handball Championship: Top Scorer
