= Pan American Men's Youth Handball Championship =

Handball competition

The Pan American Men's Youth Handball Championship was the official competition for youth men's national handball teams of Americas, and took place every two years.

In addition to crowning the Pan American champions, the tournament also served as a qualifying tournament for the Youth World Championship and the Summer Youth Olympics (2010 and 2014).

== Summary ==
| Year | Host | Final | | | Third place match | | |
| Year | Host | Champion | Score | Runner-up | Third place | Score | Fourth place |
|---|---|---|---|---|---|---|---|
| 2001; Details | (Chile); Viña del Mar | Brazil | 22–21 | Argentina | Cuba | 32–28 | Chile |
| 2003; Details | (Brazil); São José dos Pinhais | Brazil | 31–29 | Argentina | Chile | 27–21 | Uruguay |
| 2004; Details | (Brazil); São José dos Pinhais | Argentina | No playoffs | Brazil | Uruguay | No playoffs | Chile |
| 2005; Details | (Brazil); Brusque | Argentina | 30–29; OT | Brazil | Greenland | 28–19 | Mexico |
| 2006; Details | (Brazil); Blumenau | Argentina | 26–25 | Brazil | Chile | 29–16 | Uruguay |
| 2007; Details | (Brazil); Cascavel | Argentina | No playoffs | Brazil | Puerto Rico | No playoffs | Uruguay |
| 2008; Details | (Brazil); Blumenau | Argentina | 27–21 | Brazil | Puerto Rico | 29–18 | Venezuela |
| 2010; Details | (Brazil); Balneário Camboriú | Brazil | No playoffs | Argentina | Chile | No playoffs | Uruguay |
| 2011; Details | (Venezuela); Barquisimeto | Argentina | 25–24 | Brazil | Chile | 28–19 | Venezuela |
| 2013; Details | (Venezuela); San Cristobal | Argentina | 26–24 | Brazil | Venezuela | 36–29 | Chile |
| 2014; Details | (Argentina); Buenos Aires | Brazil | No playoffs | Argentina | Paraguay | No playoffs | Venezuela |
| 2015; Details | (Venezuela); San Cristobal | Brazil | No playoffs | Argentina | Chile | No playoffs | Venezuela |
| 2017; Details | (Chile); Santiago | Argentina | 22–21; OT | Brazil | Chile | 35–20 | Venezuela |

== Medal table ==
| Rank | Nation | Gold | Silver | Bronze | Total |
|---|---|---|---|---|---|
| 1 | Argentina | 8 | 5 | 0 | 13 |
| 2 | Brazil | 5 | 8 | 0 | 13 |
| 3 | Chile | 0 | 0 | 6 | 6 |
| 4 | Puerto Rico | 0 | 0 | 2 | 2 |
| 5 | Cuba | 0 | 0 | 1 | 1 |
| 5 | Greenland | 0 | 0 | 1 | 1 |
| 5 | Paraguay | 0 | 0 | 1 | 1 |
| 5 | Uruguay | 0 | 0 | 1 | 1 |
| 5 | Venezuela | 0 | 0 | 1 | 1 |
| Totals (9 entries) | | 13 | 13 | 13 | 39 |

== Participating nations ==
| Nation | (Chile) 2001 | (Brazil) 2003 | (Brazil) 2004 | (Brazil) 2005 | (Brazil) 2006 | (Brazil) 2007 | (Brazil) 2008 | (Brazil) 2010 | (Venezuela) 2011 | (Venezuela) 2013 | (Argentina) 2014 | (Venezuela) 2015 | (Chile) 2017 | Years |
|---|---|---|---|---|---|---|---|---|---|---|---|---|---|---|
| Argentina | 2nd | 2nd | 1st | 1st | 1st | 1st | 1st | 2nd | 1st | 1st | 2nd | 2nd | 1st | 13 |
| Brazil | 1st | 1st | 2nd | 2nd | 2nd | 2nd | 2nd | 1st | 2nd | 2nd | 1st | 1st | 2nd | 13 |
| Canada | - | 6th | - | - | - | - | - | - | - | 7th | - | - | 7th | 3 |
| Chile | 4th | 3rd | 4th | 5th | 3rd | 5th | 5th | 3rd | 3rd | 4th | 6th | 3rd | 3rd | 13 |
| Colombia | - | - | - | - | - | - | - | - | 7th | 6th | - | 5th | - | 3 |
| Costa Rica | - | - | - | - | - | - | - | - | - | - | - | - | 9th | 1 |
| Cuba | 3rd | - | - | - | - | - | - | - | - | - | - | - | - | 1 |
| Dominican Republic | - | - | - | - | 5th | - | - | - | - | - | - | - | - | 1 |
| Ecuador | - | - | - | - | - | - | - | - | - | - | - | 6th | - | 1 |
| Greenland | - | 5th | - | 3rd | - | - | - | - | - | - | - | - | - | 2 |
| Mexico | 6th | - | 5th | 4th | 6th | - | - | - | - | - | - | - | 5th | 5 |
| Paraguay | 8th | 7th | 6th | 7th | 7th | 6th | 7th | 6th | - | - | 3rd | - | 8th | 10 |
| Puerto Rico | 7th | - | - | - | - | 3rd | 3rd | - | 6th | - | - | - | 10th | 5 |
| United States | - | - | - | - | - | - | - | - | 8th | - | - | - | 11th | 2 |
| Uruguay | 5th | 4th | 3rd | 6th | 4th | 4th | 6th | 4th | 5th | 5th | 5th | - | 6th | 12 |
| Venezuela | - | - | - | - | - | - | 4th | 5th | 4th | 3rd | 4th | 4th | 4th | 7 |
| Total | 8 | 7 | 6 | 7 | 7 | 6 | 7 | 6 | 8 | 7 | 6 | 6 | 11 | |
