= 2008 Pan American Men's Handball Championship =

PanAmericano 2008

Tournament details
- Host country: Brazil
- Venue(s): 1 (in 1 host city)
- Dates: 24–28 June
- Teams: 7 (from 1 confederation)

Final positions
- Champions: Brazil (2nd title)
- Runner-up: Argentina
- Third place: Cuba
- Fourth place: Chile

Tournament statistics
- Matches played: 15
- Goals scored: 786 (52.4 per match)
- Top scorer(s): (Chile) Emil Feuchtmann (34 goals)

The 13th American Handball Championship, also called PanAmericano 2008, was the 13th edition of the Pan American Men's Handball Championship, held from 24 to 28 June 2008 in São Carlos, Brazil. It also acted as the qualifying competition for the 2009 World Men's Handball Championship, securing three vacancies for the World Championship. These places were earned by Brazil, Argentina and Cuba.

Eight nations had been scheduled to play at the tournament, but Dominican Republic decided not to play just a few days before the tournament, so Group B had only three participating teams.

== Preliminary round ==
All times are local (UTC−9).

Team advanced to the Semifinals
Team will play Placement Matches

All times are (UTC-3)

=== Group A ===
Team	Pld	W	D	L	GF	GA	GD	Pts
Argentina	3	3	0	0	93	62	+31	6
Chile	3	2	0	1	84	87	−3	4
Greenland	3	0	1	2	70	82	−12	1
Canada	3	0	1	2	58	74	−16	1

24 June 2008; 16:00	Argentina	36–25	Chile
24 June 2008; 16:00		(13–11)

24 June 2008; 21:00	Greenland	20–20	Canada
24 June 2008; 21:00		(6–11)

25 June 2008; 16:00	Chile	31–28	Greenland
25 June 2008; 16:00		(19–12)

25 June 2008; 18:00	Argentina	26–15	Canada
25 June 2008; 18:00		(15–10)

26 June 2008; 16:00	Chile	28–23	Canada
26 June 2008; 16:00		(17–9)

26 June 2008; 18:00	Argentina	31–22	Greenland
26 June 2008; 18:00		(16–8)

=== Group B ===
Team	Pld	W	D	L	GF	GA	GD	Pts
Brazil (H)	2	2	0	0	71	34	+37	4
Cuba	2	1	0	1	49	57	−8	2
Uruguay	2	0	0	2	37	66	−29	0

(H) Hosts

24 June 2008; 18:00	Brazil	38–13	Uruguay
24 June 2008; 18:00		(17–7)

25 June 2008; 20:00	Cuba	28–24	Uruguay
25 June 2008; 20:00		(16–9)

26 June 2008; 20:00	Brazil	33–21	Cuba
26 June 2008; 20:00		(20–10)

== Knockout stage ==
=== Bracket ===
Semi Final
27 June 2008
Argentina	33
Cuba	32
27 June 2008
Brazil	26
Chile	22

Final
28 June 2008
Argentina	24
Brazil	27
3rd/4th Place
28 June 2008
Cuba	37
Chile	30

Fifth place bracket

5th–7th Place
Greenland
Bye
27 June 2008
Canada	21
Uruguay	23

5th/6th Place
28 June 2008
Greenland	28
Uruguay	21

=== 5–7th place semifinal ===
27 June 2008; 16:00	Uruguay	23–21	Canada
27 June 2008; 16:00		(12–9)

=== Semifinals ===
27 June 2008; 14:00	Argentina	33–32	Cuba
27 June 2008; 14:00		(16–15)

27 June 2008; 18:00	Brazil	26–22	Chile
27 June 2008; 18:00		(19–10)

=== Fifth place game ===
28 June 2008; 14:00	Greenland	28–21	Uruguay
28 June 2008; 14:00		(12–10)

=== Third place game ===
28 June 2008; 16:00	Cuba	37–30	Chile
28 June 2008; 16:00		(17–18)

=== Final ===
28 June 2008; 18:00	Brazil	27–24	Argentina
28 June 2008; 18:00		(11–9)

== Final ranking ==
Gold medal	Brazil
Silver medal	Argentina
Bronze medal	Cuba
4	Chile
5	Greenland
6	Uruguay
7	Canada

== Top goalscorers ==
Rank	Name	Team	Goals
1	Emil Feuchtmann	Chile	34
2	Francisco Chacana	Chile	27
2	Minik Dahl Høegh	Greenland	27
4	Andrés Kogovsek	Argentina	25
5	Frankis Carol	Cuba	24
