= 2002 Pan American Men's Handball Championship =

Tournament details
- Host country: Argentina
- Venue(s): 1 (in 1 host city)
- Dates: 10–14 July
- Teams: 8 (from 1 confederation)

Final positions
- Champions: Argentina (2nd title)
- Runners-up: Brazil
- Third place: Greenland
- Fourth place: United States

Tournament statistics
- Matches played: 20
- Goals scored: 900 (45 per match)

The 2002 Pan American Men's Handball Championship was the tenth edition of the tournament, held in Buenos Aires, Argentina from 10 to 14 July 2002. It acted as the American qualifying tournament for the 2003 World Championship, where the top three placed team qualied.

== Preliminary round ==
All times are local (UTC−3).

=== Group A ===
Pos	Team	Pld	W	D	L	GF	GA	GD	Pts	Qualification
1	Argentina (H)	3	3	0	0	89	30	+59	6	Semifinals
2	Brazil	3	2	0	1	97	43	+54	4	Semifinals
3	Colombia	3	1	0	2	39	93	−54	2	
4	Mexico	3	0	0	3	34	93	−59	0	

Source: Todor66
Rules for classification: 1) points; 2) head-to-head points; 3) head-to-head goal difference; 4) head-to-head number of goals scored; 5) goal difference.
(H) Hosts

10 July 2002; 18:30	Brazil	42–10	Mexico
10 July 2002; 18:30		(16–4)

10 July 2002; 21:00	Argentina	36–8	Colombia
10 July 2002; 21:00		(16–4)

11 July 2002; 19:00	Brazil	40–12	Colombia
11 July 2002; 19:00		(17–6)

11 July 2002; 21:00	Argentina	32–7	Mexico
11 July 2002; 21:00		(16–4)

12 July 2002; 15:00	Colombia	19–17	Mexico
12 July 2002; 15:00		(14–10)

12 July 2002; 21:00	Argentina	21–15	Brazil
12 July 2002; 21:00		(12–7)

=== Group B ===
Pos	Team	Pld	W	D	L	GF	GA	GD	Pts	Qualification
1	Greenland	3	3	0	0	79	51	+28	6	Semifinals
2	United States	3	2	0	1	79	64	+15	4	Semifinals
3	Chile	3	1	0	2	57	72	−15	2	
4	Paraguay	3	0	0	3	62	90	−28	0	

Source: Todor66
Rules for classification: 1) points; 2) head-to-head points; 3) head-to-head goal difference; 4) head-to-head number of goals scored; 5) goal difference.

10 July 2002; 14:30	Chile	25–23	Paraguay
10 July 2002; 14:30		(11–8)

10 July 2002; 16:30	Greenland	24–20	United States
10 July 2002; 16:30		(13–11)

11 July 2002; 15:00	United States	24–16	Chile
11 July 2002; 15:00		(12–8)

11 July 2002; 17:00	Greenland	30–15	Paraguay
11 July 2002; 17:00		(15–9)

12 July 2002; 17:00	Greenland	25–16	Chile
12 July 2002; 17:00		(15–5)

12 July 2002; 19:00	United States	35–24	Paraguay
12 July 2002; 19:00		(13–15)

== Knockout stage ==
=== Bracket ===
Semi-finals
Argentina	28
United States	19
Greenland	21
Brazil	25

Final
Argentina	22
Brazil	21
Third place
United States	7
Greenland	27

Fifth place bracket

Semi-finals
Colombia	22
Paraguay	32
Chile	28
Mexico	25

Final
Paraguay	20
Chile	24
Third place
Colombia	20
Mexico	23

=== 5–8th place semifinals ===
13 July 2002; 14:00	Paraguay	32–22	Colombia
13 July 2002; 14:00		(16–9)

13 July 2002; 16:00	Chile	28–25	Mexico
13 July 2002; 16:00		(11–9)

=== Semifinals ===
13 July 2002; 18:00	Brazil	25–21	Greenland
13 July 2002; 18:00		(11–5)

13 July 2002; 20:00	Argentina	28–19	United States
13 July 2002; 20:00		(15–11)

=== Seventh place game ===
14 July 2002; 13:00	Mexico	23–20	Colombia
14 July 2002; 13:00		(9–12)

=== Fifth place game ===
14 July 2002; 15:00	Chile	24–20	Paraguay
14 July 2002; 15:00		(12–10)

=== Third place game ===
14 July 2002; 17:00	Greenland	27–7	United States
14 July 2002; 17:00		(11–2)

=== Final ===
14 July 2002; 19:00	Argentina	22–21	Brazil
14 July 2002; 19:00		(9–11)

== Final ranking ==
Qualified for the 2003 World Championship

Rank	Team
Gold medal	Argentina
Silver medal	Brazil
Bronze medal	Greenland
4	United States
5	Chile
6	Paraguay
7	Mexico
8	Colombia
