= 1994 Pan American Men's Handball Championship =

Tournament details
- Host country: Brazil
- Venue(s): 1 (in 1 host city)
- Dates: 17–23 September 1994
- Teams: 7 (from 1 confederation)

Final positions
- Champions: Cuba (6th title)
- Runner-up: Brazil
- Third place: United States
- Fourth place: Argentina

Tournament statistics
- Matches played: 21
- Goals scored: 921 (43.86 per match)

The 1994 Pan American Men's Handball Championship was the sixth edition of the tournament, held in Santa Maria, Brazil from 17 to 23 September 1994. It acted as the American qualifying tournament for the 1995 World Championship, where the top three placed team qualied.

== Standings ==
Pos	Team	Pld	W	D	L	GF	GA	GD	Pts
1st place, gold medalist(s)	Cuba	6	6	0	0	201	101	+100	12
2nd place, silver medalist(s)	Brazil (H)	6	5	0	1	167	95	+72	10
3rd place, bronze medalist(s)	United States	6	4	0	2	123	116	+7	8
4	Argentina	6	3	0	3	151	104	+47	6
5	Mexico	6	2	0	4	116	152	−36	4
6	Paraguay	6	1	0	5	85	181	−96	2
7	Uruguay	6	0	0	6	78	172	−94	0

Source: Todor66
Rules for classification: 1) points; 2) head-to-head points; 3) head-to-head goal difference; 4) head-to-head number of goals scored; 5) goal difference.
(H) Hosts

== Results ==
All times are local (UTC−3).

16 September 1994	Brazil	28–15	Mexico

17 September 1994	Argentina	29–10	Paraguay

17 September 1994	Brazil	32–15	Uruguay

18 September 1994	Argentina	35–6	Uruguay

19 September 1994	Mexico	26–21	Paraguay

19 September 1994	Cuba	25–20	Argentina

19 September 1994; 21:00	Brazil	24–14	United States

20 September 1994	Brazil	34–5	Paraguay

21 September 1994	Brazil	27–18	Argentina

21 September 1994	Cuba	23–11	United States

22 September 1994	Argentina	28–13	Mexico

22 September 1994	Paraguay	17–16	Uruguay

23 September 1994	United States	23–21	Argentina

23 September 1994; 21:00	Cuba	28–22	Brazil

September 1994	United States	32–18	Paraguay

September 1994	United States	24–12	Uruguay

September 1994	Cuba	42–19	Mexico

September 1994	Cuba	44–14	Paraguay

September 1994	United States	19–18	Mexico

September 1994	Cuba	39–15	Uruguay

September 1994	Mexico	25–14	Uruguay
