= 2017 Pan American Men's Junior Handball Championship =

Tournament details
- Host country: Paraguay
- Venue: 1 (in 1 host city)
- Dates: 20–25 March
- Teams: 7 (from 1 confederation)

Final positions
- Champions: Brazil (6th title)
- Runners-up: Argentina
- Third place: Chile
- Fourth place: United States

Tournament statistics
- Matches played: 17
- Goals scored: 1,000 (58.82 per match)
- Top scorers: Maykel Beras (DOM) (41 goals)

The 2017 Pan American Men's Junior Handball Championship the XII edition of this tournament took place in Asunción, Paraguay from 20 to 25 March 2017. It acts as a qualifying tournament for the 2017 Men's Junior World Handball Championship.

== Participating teams ==
- Argentina
- Brazil
- Chile
- Dominican Republic
- Paraguay
- United States
- Uruguay

== Preliminary round ==
All times are local (UTC−03:00).

=== Group A ===
| Pos | Team | Pld | W | D | L | GF | GA | GD | Pts |
|---|---|---|---|---|---|---|---|---|---|
| 1 | Argentina | 3 | 3 | 0 | 0 | 113 | 60 | 53 | 6 |
| 2 | Paraguay | 3 | 2 | 0 | 1 | 97 | 69 | 28 | 4 |
| 3 | Uruguay | 3 | 1 | 0 | 2 | 81 | 104 | –23 | 2 |
| 4 | Dominican Republic | 3 | 0 | 0 | 3 | 71 | 129 | –58 | 0 |

| Team qualified to the semi-finals |
| Teams qualified to the quarter-finals |

| March 20; 17:00 | Argentina | 44–19 | Dominican Republic | Secretaría Nacional de Deportes, Asunción; Referees: Moraga, Zavalla (CHI) |
| March 20; 17:00 | Vega, Cantore 7 | (20–6) | Tejeda 5 | Secretaría Nacional de Deportes, Asunción; Referees: Moraga, Zavalla (CHI) |
| March 20; 17:00 | 1× (yellow card) 4× (suspension) | Report | 4× (suspension) 2× (red card) | Secretaría Nacional de Deportes, Asunción; Referees: Moraga, Zavalla (CHI) |

| March 20; 21:00 | Uruguay | 22–30 | Paraguay | Secretaría Nacional de Deportes, Asunción; Referees: Magalhaes, Rocha (BRA) |
| March 20; 21:00 | Losada, De Agrela 4 | (9–12) | Marquez 9 | Secretaría Nacional de Deportes, Asunción; Referees: Magalhaes, Rocha (BRA) |
| March 20; 21:00 | 2× (yellow card) 4× (suspension) | Report | 2× (yellow card) 9× (suspension) | Secretaría Nacional de Deportes, Asunción; Referees: Magalhaes, Rocha (BRA) |

| March 21; 19:30 | Dominican Republic | 38–41 | Uruguay | Secretaría Nacional de Deportes, Asunción; Referees: Galeano, Franco (PAR) |
| March 21; 19:30 | Beras 12 | (19–21) | Triunfo 14 | Secretaría Nacional de Deportes, Asunción; Referees: Galeano, Franco (PAR) |
| March 21; 19:30 | 1× (yellow card) 9× (suspension) 1× (red card) | Report | 1× (yellow card) 2× (suspension) | Secretaría Nacional de Deportes, Asunción; Referees: Galeano, Franco (PAR) |

| March 21; 21:30 | Paraguay | 23–33 | Argentina | Secretaría Nacional de Deportes, Asunción; Referees: Sosa, Lemes (URU) |
| March 21; 21:30 | Melgarejo 5 | (11–23) | Bono 8 | Secretaría Nacional de Deportes, Asunción; Referees: Sosa, Lemes (URU) |
| March 21; 21:30 | 1× (yellow card) 5× (suspension) 1× (red card) | Report | 3× (yellow card) 4× (suspension) 1× (red card) | Secretaría Nacional de Deportes, Asunción; Referees: Sosa, Lemes (URU) |

| March 22; 17:30 | Argentina | 36–18 | Uruguay | Secretaría Nacional de Deportes, Asunción; Referees: Galeano, Franco (PAR) |
| March 22; 17:30 | Rosetto 6 | (18–12) | De Agrela 4 | Secretaría Nacional de Deportes, Asunción; Referees: Galeano, Franco (PAR) |
| March 22; 17:30 | 2× (yellow card) 4× (suspension) | Report | 2× (yellow card) 4× (suspension) | Secretaría Nacional de Deportes, Asunción; Referees: Galeano, Franco (PAR) |

| March 22; 21:30 | Paraguay | 44–14 | Dominican Republic | Secretaría Nacional de Deportes, Asunción; Referees: Moraga, Zavalla (CHI) |
| March 22; 21:30 | Four players 6 | (17–5) | Soto, Tejeda 4 | Secretaría Nacional de Deportes, Asunción; Referees: Moraga, Zavalla (CHI) |
| March 22; 21:30 | 1× (yellow card) 5× (suspension) | Report | 3× (yellow card) 4× (suspension) | Secretaría Nacional de Deportes, Asunción; Referees: Moraga, Zavalla (CHI) |

=== Group B ===
| Pos | Team | Pld | W | D | L | GF | GA | GD | Pts |
|---|---|---|---|---|---|---|---|---|---|
| 1 | Brazil | 2 | 2 | 0 | 0 | 87 | 54 | 33 | 4 |
| 2 | United States | 2 | 1 | 0 | 1 | 55 | 76 | –21 | 2 |
| 3 | Chile | 2 | 0 | 0 | 2 | 54 | 66 | –12 | 0 |

| Team qualified to the semi-finals |
| Teams qualified to the quarter-finals |

| March 20; 19:00 | Brazil | 52–24 | United States | Secretaría Nacional de Deportes, Asunción; Referees: Ojeda, Zapata (COL) |
| March 20; 19:00 | Baptista 6 | (23–14) | Hoddersen 6 | Secretaría Nacional de Deportes, Asunción; Referees: Ojeda, Zapata (COL) |
| March 20; 19:00 | 3× (yellow card) 3× (suspension) | Report | 6× (yellow card) | Secretaría Nacional de Deportes, Asunción; Referees: Ojeda, Zapata (COL) |

| March 21; 17:30 | United States | 31–24 | Chile | Secretaría Nacional de Deportes, Asunción; Referees: Hernalz, Ochatt (ARG) |
| March 21; 17:30 | Hoddersen 17 | (14–9) | Codina 8 | Secretaría Nacional de Deportes, Asunción; Referees: Hernalz, Ochatt (ARG) |
| March 21; 17:30 | 1× (yellow card) 3× (suspension) | Report | 2× (yellow card) 5× (suspension) | Secretaría Nacional de Deportes, Asunción; Referees: Hernalz, Ochatt (ARG) |

| March 22; 19:30 | Chile | 30–35 | Brazil | Secretaría Nacional de Deportes, Asunción; Referees: Sosa, Lemes (URU) |
| March 22; 19:30 | Valenzuela 9 | (14–18) | Torriani 5 | Secretaría Nacional de Deportes, Asunción; Referees: Sosa, Lemes (URU) |
| March 22; 19:30 | 2× (yellow card) 5× (suspension) | Report | 3× (yellow card) 5× (suspension) | Secretaría Nacional de Deportes, Asunción; Referees: Sosa, Lemes (URU) |

== Knockout stage ==
=== Bracket ===
Quarter-finals
23 March
United States | 25
Uruguay | 23
23 March
Paraguay | 24
Chile | 36

Semi-finals
24 March
Argentina | 31
United States | 22
24 March
Brazil | 30
Chile | 11

Gold medal
25 March
Argentina | 23
Brazil | 31
Bronze medal
25 March
United States | 18
Chile | 23

=== Quarterfinals ===
| March 23; 19:30 | United States | 25–23 | Uruguay | Secretaría Nacional de Deportes, Asunción; Referees: Hernalz, Ochatt (ARG) |
| March 23; 19:30 | Binderis 10 | (10–11) | De Agrela 6 | Secretaría Nacional de Deportes, Asunción; Referees: Hernalz, Ochatt (ARG) |
| March 23; 19:30 | 3× (yellow card) 6× (suspension) 3× (red card) | Report | 1× (yellow card) 6× (suspension) 1× (red card) | Secretaría Nacional de Deportes, Asunción; Referees: Hernalz, Ochatt (ARG) |

| March 23; 21:30 | Paraguay | 24–36 | Chile | Secretaría Nacional de Deportes, Asunción; Referees: Magalhaes, Lemes (BRA) |
| March 23; 21:30 | Martinez 7 | (12–16) | Codina 9 | Secretaría Nacional de Deportes, Asunción; Referees: Magalhaes, Lemes (BRA) |
| March 23; 21:30 | 3× (yellow card) 3× (suspension) | Report | 2× (yellow card) 8× (suspension) | Secretaría Nacional de Deportes, Asunción; Referees: Magalhaes, Lemes (BRA) |

=== Semifinals ===
| March 24; 19:30 | Argentina | 31–22 | United States | Secretaría Nacional de Deportes, Asunción; Referees: Moraga, Zavalla (CHI) |
| March 24; 19:30 | Cantore 9 | (19–14) | Kollmann 5 | Secretaría Nacional de Deportes, Asunción; Referees: Moraga, Zavalla (CHI) |
| March 24; 19:30 | 2× (yellow card) 4× (suspension) | Report | 1× (yellow card) 3× (suspension) | Secretaría Nacional de Deportes, Asunción; Referees: Moraga, Zavalla (CHI) |

| March 24; 21:30 | Brazil | 30–11 | Chile | Secretaría Nacional de Deportes, Asunción; Referees: Ojeda, Zapata (COL) |
| March 24; 21:30 | Dutra 8 | (14–5) | Cabrera 3 | Secretaría Nacional de Deportes, Asunción; Referees: Ojeda, Zapata (COL) |
| March 24; 21:30 | 2× (yellow card) 2× (suspension) | Report | 2× (yellow card) 1× (suspension) | Secretaría Nacional de Deportes, Asunción; Referees: Ojeda, Zapata (COL) |

=== Consolation round ===
| March 24; 17:30 | Dominican Republic | 36–34 | Uruguay | Secretaría Nacional de Deportes, Asunción; Referees: Franco, Galeano (PAR) |
| March 24; 17:30 | Beras 11 | (19–20) | De Agrela 9 | Secretaría Nacional de Deportes, Asunción; Referees: Franco, Galeano (PAR) |
| March 24; 17:30 | 1× (yellow card) 5× (suspension) | Report | 1× (yellow card) 2× (suspension) | Secretaría Nacional de Deportes, Asunción; Referees: Franco, Galeano (PAR) |

| March 25; 17:30 | Dominican Republic | 34–41 | Paraguay | Secretaría Nacional de Deportes, Asunción; Referees: Hernalz, Ochatt (ARG) |
| March 25; 17:30 | Beras 14 | (22–17) | Martinez 8 | Secretaría Nacional de Deportes, Asunción; Referees: Hernalz, Ochatt (ARG) |
| March 25; 17:30 | 2× (yellow card) 4× (suspension) | Report | 1× (yellow card) 4× (suspension) | Secretaría Nacional de Deportes, Asunción; Referees: Hernalz, Ochatt (ARG) |

=== Third place game ===
| March 25; 17:30 | United States | 18–23 | Chile | Secretaría Nacional de Deportes, Asunción; Referees: Magalhaes, Rocha (BRA) |
| March 25; 17:30 | Fofana 7 | (9–13) | Codina 8 | Secretaría Nacional de Deportes, Asunción; Referees: Magalhaes, Rocha (BRA) |
| March 25; 17:30 | 3× (yellow card) 6× (suspension) 1× (red card) | Report | 2× (yellow card) 3× (suspension) | Secretaría Nacional de Deportes, Asunción; Referees: Magalhaes, Rocha (BRA) |

=== Final ===
| March 25; 21:30 | Argentina | 23–31 | Brazil | Secretaría Nacional de Deportes, Asunción; Referees: Sosa, Lemes (URU) |
| March 25; 21:30 | Bono 7 | (14–18) | Dutra 6 | Secretaría Nacional de Deportes, Asunción; Referees: Sosa, Lemes (URU) |
| March 25; 21:30 | 2× (yellow card) 3× (suspension) | Report | 1× (yellow card) 5× (suspension) | Secretaría Nacional de Deportes, Asunción; Referees: Sosa, Lemes (URU) |

== Final standing ==
| Rank | Team |
|---|---|
| Gold medal | Brazil |
| Silver medal | Argentina |
| Bronze medal | Chile |
| 4 | United States |
| 5 | Paraguay |
| 6 | Dominican Republic |
| 7 | Uruguay |

| Teams qualified to the 2017 Men's Junior World Handball Championship |
