= Colombia men's national handball team =

Colombia

Information
- Nickname: Los Muiscas
- Association: Federacion Colombiana de Balomano
- Coach: Fernando González

Colours
1st	2nd

Results

Pan American Championship
- Appearances: 4 (First in 1998)
- Best result: 8th (1998, 2002)
- Last updated on Unknown.

The Colombia national handball team is the team of national players Colombia representing the Colombian Federation of Handball in international competitions organized by the International Handball Federation (IHF) or the International Olympic Committee (IOC). Never participated in the Olympic Games and world, only participates in the Pan. In recent years the discipline is growing.

== Competition record ==
=== Pan American Championship ===
Year	Round	Position	GP	W	D*	L	GS	GA
(Cuba) 1998	7th place match	8	7	1	0	6	143	234
(Argentina) 2002	7th place match	8	5	1	0	4	81	148
(Argentina) 2016	9th place match	9	6	2	0	4	129	190
(Greenland) 2018	9th place match	9	6	2	0	4	149	176

=== Junior Pan American Games ===
Games	Round	Position	Pld	W	D	L	GF	GA	GD
(Colombia) 2021 Cali	7th place game	7th	5	1	0	4	145	165	-20

=== Central American and Caribbean Games ===
Games	Round	Position	Pld	W	D	L	GF	GA	GD
(Colombia) 2018 Barranquilla	5th place game	5th	5	4	0	1	140	121	19

=== Caribbean Handball Cup ===
Year	Round	Position	GP	W	D*	L	GS	GA
(Colombia) 2017	6th place match	6	6	1	1	4	139	176

=== Bolivarian Games ===
Games	Round	Position	Pld	W	D	L	GF	GA	GD
(Colombia) 2017 Santa Marta	round robin	2nd	4	3	0	1	139	98	41
(Colombia) 2022 Valledupar	round robin	3rd	4	2	0	2	124	130	-6

=== IHF South and Central American Emerging Nations Championship ===
Year	Round	Position	GP	W	D*	L	GS	GA
(Colombia) 2018	Final	1st	6	6	0	0	219	113

=== IHF Emerging Nations Championship ===
Year	Round	Position	GP	W	D*	L	GS	GA
(Georgia (country)) 2019	7th place match	8th	7	2	0	5	211	225
