= Venezuela men's national handball team =

Venezuela

Information
- Association: Federacion Venezolana de Balonmano

Colours
1st	2nd

Results

Pan American Championship
- Appearances: 1 (First in 2012)
- Best result: 8th (2012)
- Last updated on Unknown.

The Venezuela national handball team is the national team of Venezuela. It takes part in international handball competitions.

== Tournament record ==
=== Pan American Championship ===
Games	Round	Position	Pld	W	D	L	GF	GA	GD
(Argentina) 2012 Burzaco	consolation round	8th	5	1	0	4	131	188	−57

=== Caribbean Handball Cup ===
Year	Round	Position	Pld	W	D	L	GF	GA	GD
(Colombia) 2017	5th place match	6th	6	1	1	4	166	175	−9

=== South American Games ===
Games	Round	Position	Pld	W	D	L	GF	GA	GD
(Bolivia) 2018 Cochabamba	consolation round	5th	4	2	0	2	112	91	+21
(Paraguay) 2022 Asunción	round robin	5th	4	0	1	3	198	147	−49

=== Central American and Caribbean Games ===
Games	Round	Position	Pld	W	D	L	GF	GA	GD
(El Salvador) 2023 San Salvador	consolation round	5th	5	2	1	2	148	152	−4

=== Bolivarian Games ===
Games	Round	Position	Pld	W	D	L	GF	GA	GD
(Colombia) 2017 Santa Marta	round robin	3rd	4	2	1	1	174	95	+79
(Colombia) 2022 Valledupar	round robin	2nd	4	2	0	2	126	139	-13
