= Paraguay men's national handball team =

Paraguay

Information
- Association: Federacion Paraguaya de Handball
- Coach: Victor Figueredo
- Assistant coach: Carlos Ramírez; Rodrigo Rojas

Colours
1st	2nd

Results

Pan American Championship
- Appearances: 6 (First in 1981)
- Best result: 6th (1981, 1994, 2002, 2012)
- Last updated on Unknown.

The Paraguay national handball team is the team that represents Paraguay in the international handball competitions organized by the Pan-American Team Handball Federation (PATHF), the International Handball Federation (IHF) and the International Olympic Committee (IOC), and is governed by the Federación Paraguaya de Handball. Paraguay participated in 5 Pan American Men's Handball Championships in 1981, 1994, 2002, 2012 and 2016.

== Tournament record ==
=== Pan American Championship ===
Year	Round	Position	GP	W	D*	L	GF	GA
(Argentina) 1981	fifth place match	6th	4	1	0	3	79	137
(Brazil) 1994	round robin	6th	6	1	0	5	85	181
(Argentina) 2002	fifth place match	6th	5	1	0	4	114	136
(Argentina) 2012	fifth place match	6th	4	1	0	3	68	118
(Argentina) 2016	eleventh place match	12th	6	0	0	6	140	216
(Greenland) 2018	eleventh place match	11th	5	0	0	5	104	158

=== Pan American Games ===
- 1995 – 5th
- 2031 – Qualified as host

=== South and Central American Championship ===
Year	Round	Position	GP	W	D*	L	GF	GA
(Brazil) 2020	round robin	5th	5	1	0	4	133	169
(Brazil) 2022	Fifth place game	5th	4	2	0	2	101	134
(Argentina) 2024	round robin	4th	5	2	0	3	114	188
(Paraguay) 2026	round robin	5th	5	1	0	4	131	181
Total	4/4		19	6	0	13	479	672

=== South American Games ===
Games	Round	Position	Pld	W	D	L	GF	GA
(Chile) 2014 Santiago	Group stage	7th	3	0	0	3	51	100
(Paraguay) 2022 Asunción	Round robin	4th	4	0	1	3	107	155

=== IHF South and Central American Emerging Nations Championship ===
Year	Round	Position	GP	W	D*	L	GF	GA
(Colombia) 2018	final	2nd	5	3	0	2	165	131

=== Pan American Games qualification tournaments ===
Year	Round	Position	GP	W	D*	L	GS	GA
(Paraguay) 2023	round robin	3rd	2	0	0	2	58	68

=== IHF Emerging Nations Championship ===
Year	Round	Position	GP	W	D*	L	GS	GA
(Bulgaria) 2025	Fifth place game	5th	5	3	0	2	146	141

== Junior team ==
=== World Junior Championship ===
Year	Round	Position	GP	W	D*	L	GF	GA
(Brazil) 2015	president's cup	24th	7	0	0	7	144	310

=== Pan American Junior Championship ===
Year	Round	Position	GP	W	D*	L	GF	GA
(Argentina) 2013	placement matches	9th	5	0	0	5	113	174
(Brazil) 2015	round robin	5th	5	1	0	4	113	164
(Paraguay) 2017	Quarter-finals	5th	5	3	0	2	162	139
