= Uruguay men's national handball team =

Uruguay

Information
- Nickname: La Celeste, Los Charrúas
- Association: Federacion Uruguaya de Handball
- Coach: Héctor Sintas
- Assistant coach: Manuel Adler

Colours
1st	2nd

Results

World Championship
- Appearances: 2 (First in 2021)
- Best result: 24th (2021)

Pan American Championship
- Appearances: 10 (First in 1994)
- Best result: 4th (2012, 2014, 2016)
- Last updated on Unknown.

The Uruguay national handball team is the national handball team of Uruguay. It takes part in international handball competitions.

== Results ==
=== World Championship ===
Year	Round	Position	GP	W	D*	L	GF	GA
1938 to 2019	Did not qualify							
(Egypt) 2021	Main round	24	6	1	0	5	98	192
(Poland) / (Sweden) 2023	Presidents Cup	32	7	0	0	7	175	248
(Croatia) / (Denmark) / (Norway) 2025	Did not qualify							
(Germany) 2027	Qualified							
(France) / (Germany) 2029	Future event							
(Denmark) / (Iceland) / (Norway) 2031	Future event							
Total	3/32		13	1	0	12	273	440

=== Pan American Championship ===
Year	Round	Position	GP	W	D*	L	GF	GA
(Brazil) 1994	round robin	7	6	0	0	6	37	84
(Cuba) 1998	groups round	9	4	0	0	4	77	153
(Brazil) 2000	groups round	8	5	0	0	5	106	154
(Brazil) 2006	groups round	6	5	1	0	4	131	139
(Brazil) 2008	groups round	6	4	1	0	3	81	115
(Chile) 2010	groups round	5	5	3	1	1	131	139
(Argentina) 2012	3rd place match	4	5	2	0	3	107	136
(Uruguay) 2014	3rd place match	4	5	2	0	3	118	129
(Argentina) 2016	3rd place match	4	7	4	0	3	172	173
(Greenland) 2018	5th place match	6	7	4	0	3	194	181
Total	10/18		53	17	1	35	1154	1413

=== South and Central American Championship ===
Year	Round	Position	GP	W	D*	L	GF	GA
(Brazil) 2020	round robin	3rd place	5	3	0	2	148	110
(Brazil) 2022	third place game	4th place	4	1	0	3	101	129
(Argentina) 2024	round robin	5th place	5	1	0	4	113	151
(Paraguay) 2026	round robin	4th place	5	2	0	3	131	149
Total	4/4		19	7	0	12	503	539

=== Other competitions ===
South American Games
Games	Round	Position	Pld	W	D	L	GF	GA	GD
(Brazil) 2002 São Bernardo do Campo	Bronze medal match	3rd	5	2	0	3	91	124	−33
(Argentina) 2006 Mar del Plata	Gold medal match	2nd	5	3	0	2	129	110	19
(Colombia) 2010 Medellin	round robin	4th	4	1	1	2	98	125	−27
(Chile) 2014 Santiago	Bronze medal match	4th	5	2	0	3	103	125	−22
(Bolivia) 2018 Cochabamba	Bronze medal match	4th	4	1	0	3	90	114	−24
(Paraguay) 2022 Asunción	round robin	3rd	4	2	0	2	105	124	−19
Total	6/6		27	11	1	15	616	722	-106

IHF Emerging Nations Championship
Year	Round	Position	GP	W	D*	L	GS	GA
(Kosovo) 2015	Bronze medal match	4	6	3	0	3	159	129
Total	1/1		6	3	0	3	159	129

=== Friendly tournaments ===
- 2017 Four Nations Tournament – 3rd
- Torneo Cuatro Naciones de Handball 2023 – 3rd

== Current squad ==
Squad for the 2023 World Men's Handball Championship.

Head coach: Héctor Sintas

No.	Pos.	Name	Date of birth (age)	Height	App.	Goals	Club
1	GK	Felipe Navarrete	4 August 1999 (age 27)	1.89 m	32	3	(Uruguay) Colegio Alemán
2	P	Gabriel Chaparro	20 February 1995 (age 31)	1.93 m	55	24	(Spain) SD Atlético Novás
3	RW	Facundo Lima	13 April 2000 (age 26)	1.75 m	8	10	(Uruguay) Pontevedrés Balonmano
11	CB	Diego Falabrino	8 November 1993 (age 32)	1.78 m	7	0	(Uruguay) Pontevedrés Balonmano
13	RB	Máximo Cancio	24 February 1984 (age 42)	1.90 m	30	131	(Spain) Balonmano Vetusta
14	LB	Bruno Borba	28 February 2002 (age 24)	1.92 m	15	30	(Uruguay) Pontevedrés Balonmano
16	GK	Felipe González	8 December 1993 (age 32)	1.89 m	62	3	(Spain) CB Maristas Algemesi
17	RB	Diego Morandeira	4 February 1993 (age 33)	1.86 m	135	88	(Spain) Club Balonmano Mislata
18	P	Zion Ramos	18 October 2002 (age 24)	1.87 m	6	12	(Sweden) HK Malmö
19	CB	Rodrigo Botejara	28 January 1993 (age 33)	1.73 m	66	105	(Uruguay) Scuola Italiana di Montevideo
20	LW	Federico Rubbo	5 April 1989 (age 37)	1.83 m	68	228	(Uruguay) Scuola Italiana di Montevideo
21	LB	Giovanni Capello	21 December 2001 (age 24)	1.88 m	8	18	(Uruguay) Pontevedrés Balonmano
24	LB	Alejandro Velazco	24 October 1993 (age 33)	1.83 m	77	308	(Uruguay) Colegio Alemán
36	LW	Cristian Rostagno	14 October 1995 (age 31)	1.78 m	38	50	(Spain) Handbol Adrianenc
40	RB	Maximiliano De Agrela	19 October 1996 (age 30)	1.83 m	27	44	(Uruguay) Club Malvín
74	LW	Guillermo Millán	7 July 1996 (age 30)	1.74 m	22	20	(Uruguay) Scuola Italiana di Montevideo

== Junior team ==
=== World Junior Championship ===
Year	Round	Position	GP	W	D*	L	GF	GA
(Brazil) 2015	president's cup	22nd	7	1	0	6	126	206

=== Pan American Junior Championship ===
- 1993 –
- 1997 –
- 2005 – 4th
- 2007 – 4th

Year	Round	Position	GP	W	D*	L	GF	GA
(Argentina) 2009	round robin	5th	5	1	0	4	103	158
(Brazil) 2011	round robin	5th	4	0	0	4	72	130
(Argentina) 2013	placement matches	5th	4	2	0	2	92	86
(Brazil) 2015	round robin	4th	5	2	0	3	110	117
