= Chile men's national handball team =

Chile

Information
- Nickname: La Roja
- Association: Federación Chilena de Balónmano
- Coach: Aitor Etxaburu
- Assistant coach: Rodrigo Guzmán

Colours
1st	2nd

Results

World Championship
- Appearances: 9 (First in 2011)
- Best result: 16th (2019)

Pan American Championship
- Appearances: 10 (First in 1981)
- Best result: (silver) 2nd (2016)
- Last updated on Unknown.

The Chile national handball team is controlled by the Chilean Handball Federation, and takes part in international team handball competitions. It is affiliated to the IHF and the PATHF.

== Honours ==
Pan American Games

- Runners-up: 2019
- 3rd place: 2011, 2015

Pan American Championship

- Runners-up: 2016
- Third place: 2010, 2012, 2014, 2018

== Participation in 2011 World Championship ==
The Chile national handball team participated in the 2011 World Men's Handball Championship in Group D. On 13 January they played their first match against Sweden, losing 18–28. Against South Korea they lost 22–37, versus Poland 23–38, but against Slovakia they tied the game 29–29, obtaining a historic result in this competition. Finally they lost against Argentina 25–35, remaining in the last place the group with only one point.

== Competitions records ==
=== Olympic Games ===
Olympic Games
Year	Round	Position	Pld	W	D	L	GF	GA
1936 to 1976	did not enter							
1980 to 2020	did not qualify							

=== World Championship ===
World Championship
Year	Round	Position	Pld	W	D	L	GF	GA
1938 to 1978	did not enter							
1982 to 2009	did not qualify							
Sweden 2011	President's Cup	22nd	7	1	1	5	164	216
Spain 2013	President's Cup	23rd	7	1	0	6	184	236
Qatar 2015	President's Cup	23rd	7	0	1	6	165	224
France 2017	President's Cup	21st	7	3	0	4	192	219
Germany/Denmark 2019	President's Cup	16th	7	2	0	5	187	236
Egypt 2021	President's Cup	27th	7	3	0	4	222	221
Poland/Sweden 2023	President's Cup	26th	7	3	0	4	202	205
Croatia/Denmark/Norway 2025	Main round	24th	6	1	0	5	157	212
Germany 2027	Qualified							
France/Germany 2029	To be determined							
Denmark/Iceland/Norway 2031	To be determined							
Total	9/29		55	14	2	39	1473	1769

==== Record against other teams at the World Championship ====
National team	Pld	W	D	L	GF	GA	GD
Algeria	1	1	0	0	30	28	+2
Argentina	1	0	0	1	25	35	−10
Australia	2	2	0	0	61	44	+17
Austria	2	1	0	1	63	57	+6
Bahrain	1	1	0	0	35	30	+5
Belarus	2	1	0	1	55	62	−7
Brazil	2	0	0	2	40	58	−18
Croatia	1	0	0	1	22	37	−15
Denmark	2	0	0	2	40	82	−42
(Democratic Republic of the Congo) DR Congo	1	1	0	0	35	30	+5
Egypt	1	0	0	1	29	35	–6
Germany	1	0	0	1	14	35	−21
Hungary	1	0	0	1	29	34	−5
Iceland	1	0	0	1	22	38	−16
Iran	2	0	0	2	55	57	−2
Japan	1	1	0	0	35	29	+6
(North Macedonia) Macedonia	4	0	0	4	113	132	−19
Montenegro	2	0	0	2	64	70	−6
Morocco	1	1	0	0	28	17	+11
Norway	1	0	0	1	20	41	−21
Poland	1	0	0	1	23	38	−15
Qatar	3	0	0	3	70	95	−25
Russia	1	0	0	1	24	36	−12
Saudi Arabia	3	2	0	1	83	76	+7
Slovakia	1	0	1	0	29	29	0
Slovenia	1	0	0	1	23	36	−13
South Korea	3	2	0	1	99	96	+3
Spain	2	0	0	2	42	71	−29
Sweden	2	0	0	2	44	69	−25
Tunisia	1	0	0	2	56	74	−18
Uruguay	1	1	0	0	34	24	+10
Total	49	14	1	34	1316	1557	−241

=== Pan American Games ===
Pan American Games
Year	Round	Position	Pld	W	D	L	GF	GA
1987 to 1999	did not qualify							
2003	Group stage	5th place	5	2	0	3	114	127
2007	Group stage	5th place	5	3	0	2	123	147
2011	Semi-final	3rd place	5	3	0	2	153	139
2015	Semi-final	3rd place	5	2	1	2	134	135
2019	Final	2nd place	5	3	0	2	160	145
2023	Semi-final	3rd place	5	3	0	2	144	132

==== Record against other teams at the Pan American Games ====
National team	Pld	W	D	L	GF	GA	GD
Argentina	5	0	0	5	130	151	−21
Brazil	6	1	0	5	140	196	−56
Canada	2	2	0	0	71	45	+26
Cuba	3	1	1	1	87	99	−12
Dominican Republic	3	3	0	1	109	97	+12
Mexico	3	3	0	0	85	67	+18
Puerto Rico	2	2	0	0	59	46	+13
United States	2	2	0	0	62	53	+9
Uruguay	2	1	0	1	48	43	+5
Venezuela	1	1	0	0	37	28	+9
Total	30	16	1	13	828	825	+3

=== Pan American Championship ===
Pan American Championship
Year	Round	Position	Pld	W	D	L	GF	GA
1981	Group stage	5th place	5	0	0	5	52	141
2002	Group stage	5th place	5	3	0	2	109	117
2004	Semi-final	4th place	5	2	0	3	112	140
2006	Group stage	5th place	5	3	0	2	144	149
2008	Semi-final	4th place	5	2	0	3	136	150
2010	Semi-final	3rd place	5	2	1	2	136	142
2012	Semi-final	3rd place	6	4	1	1	193	157
2014	Semi-final	3rd place	5	3	0	2	135	136
2016	Final	2nd place	7	5	0	2	226	161
2018	Semi-final	3rd place	6	4	0	2	189	145

=== South and Central American Championship ===
Year	Round	Position	GP	W	D*	L	GF	GA
(Brazil) 2020	round robin	4th place	5	2	0	3	151	119
(Brazil) 2022	third place game	3rd place	5	3	0	2	152	129
(Argentina) 2024	round robin	3rd place	5	3	1	1	151	107
(Paraguay) 2026	round robin	3rd place	5	3	0	2	160	134
Total	4/4		20	11	1	8	614	489

=== Other competitions ===
Olympic qualification tournament
Tournament	Outcome	Position	Pld	W	D	L	GF	GA
(Croatia) 2012	not qualified	4th	3	0	0	3	58	93
(Poland) 2016	not qualified	4th	3	0	0	3	83	100
(Montenegro) 2021	not qualified	4th	3	0	0	3	82	100

- 2015 Four Nations Tournament – 4th
- 2016 Four Nations Tournament – 2nd
- 2017 Four Nations Tournament – 4th
- 2017 Bolivarian Games –
- 2018 South American Games –
- 2021 Junior Pan American Games –
- 2022 Bolivarian Games –
- 2022 South American Games –

== Team ==
=== Current squad ===
Squad for the 2025 World Men's Handball Championship.

Head coach: Aitor Etxaburu

No.	Pos.	Name	Date of birth (age)	Height	App.	Goals	Club
1	GK	Vicente González	30 September 1999 (age 26)	1.92 m	34	0	(Italy) Secchia Rubiera
4	LB	Erwin Feuchtmann	2 May 1990 (age 36)	1.90 m	93	515	(France) Fenix Toulouse Handball
6	CB	Arian Delgado	25 August 2001 (age 24)	1.80 m	12	12	(Chile) Liceo Nacional de Maipu
7	LW	Rodrigo Aedo	7 May 2000 (age 26)	1.77 m	0	0	(Chile) Balonmano USAB
9	P	Javier Frelijj	28 January 1991 (age 35)	1.91 m	85	108	(Chile) Balonmano Ovalle
11	P	Esteban Salinas	18 January 1992 (age 34)	1.83 m	100	369	(Spain) CD Bidasoa
12	GK	Felipe García	26 October 1993 (age 32)	1.90 m	73	4	(Spain) CB Zamora
14	P	Benjamin Illesca	4 February 2000 (age 26)	1.96 m	14	10	(Spain) CBM Gáldar
17	RB	Rodrigo Salinas Muñoz	25 February 1989 (age 37)	1.89 m	122	425	(Spain) CD Bidasoa
18	CB	Cristóbal Oyarzún	30 June 2004 (age 22)	1.92 m	0	0	(Spain) CB SantoÑa
22	CB	Matias Payá	31 March 2000 (age 26)	1.76 m	7	8	(Spain) Balonmano Sinfín
25	RB	Joshua Mesías	27 April 2002 (age 24)	1.88 m	0	0	(Sweden) IFK Karlskrona
28	RW	Luciano Scaramelli	23 April 2002 (age 24)	1.82 m	0	0	(Italy) Pallamano Conversano
30	RB	Daniel Ayala	30 December 1995 (age 30)	1.77 m	54	92	(Chile) Colo-Colo
32	LW	Danilo Salgado	1 June 1998 (age 28)	1.79 m	9	12	(Spain) CB Pozuelo De Calatrava
35	RB	Nicolás González	20 February 2001 (age 25)	1.95 m	0	0	(Spain) CB SantoÑa
37	CB	Christian Moll	13 March 1993 (age 33)	1.84 m	50	35	(Spain) BM San Juan
55	RW	Francisco Ahumada	19 July 2001 (age 25)	1.74 m	7	25	(Spain) CB Nava

=== Statistics ===
Most capped players
Player	Games	Position
Emil Feuchtmann	164	CB
Rodrigo Salinas	122	OB
Marco Oneto	115	P
Esteban Salinas	100	P
Felipe Barrientos	97	GK
Erwin Feuchtmann	93	OB
Patricio Martínez	80	W

Top scorers
Player	Goals	Position
Erwin Feuchtmann	515	OB, CB
Emil Feuchtmann	442	CB
Rodrigo Salinas	425	OB
Esteban Salinas	368	P
Marco Oneto	195	P
Patricio Martínez	170	W

== Youth teams ==
=== World Junior Championship ===
Year	Round	Position	W	D	L	GF	GA	GD
(Sweden) 1977	did not qualify							
(Denmark) 1979	did not qualify							
(Portugal) 1981	did not qualify							
(Finland) 1983	did not qualify							
(Italy) 1985	did not qualify							
(Socialist Federal Republic of Yugoslavia) 1987	did not qualify							
(Spain) 1989	did not qualify							
(Greece) 1991	did not qualify							
(Egypt) 1993	did not qualify							
(Argentina) 1995	did not qualify							
(Turkey) 1997	did not qualify							
(Qatar) 1999	did not qualify							
(Switzerland) 2001	did not qualify							
(Brazil) 2003	did not qualify							
(Hungary) 2005	Group stage	20th	1	0	7	184	291	−107
(North Macedonia) 2007	Group stage	20th	0	0	8	184	283	−99
(Egypt) 2009	did not qualify							
(Greece) 2011	Group stage	21st	2	0	5	147	238	−91
(Bosnia and Herzegovina) 2013	Group stage	23rd	1	0	6	162	226	−64
(Brazil) 2015	Group stage	23rd	1	0	6	159	219	−60
(Algeria) 2017	Group stage	23rd	1	0	6	179	244	−65
(Spain) 2019	Group stage	20th	1	0	6	170	235	–65
Total			7	0	44	1185	1736	-551

==== Record against other teams at the World Junior Championship ====
National team	Pld	W	D	L	PF	PA	PD
Algeria	2	1	0	1	50	56	−6
Angola	1	0	0	1	29	38	−9
Argentina	3	1	0	2	64	88	−24
Bahrain	1	0	0	1	29	30	−1
Brazil	2	0	0	2	41	54	−13
Burkina Faso	1	1	0	0	36	21	+15
Canada	1	1	0	0	27	26	+1
(Republic of the Congo) Congo	3	1	0	2	86	88	−2
Denmark	1	0	0	1	20	39	−19
Egypt	2	0	0	2	36	70	−34
Faroe Islands	1	0	0	1	28	31	−3
France	4	0	0	4	78	150	−72
Germany	4	0	0	4	80	171	−91
Hungary	1	0	0	1	23	39	−16
Iceland	1	0	0	2	42	69	−27
Kuwait	2	0	0	2	57	63	−6
Nigeria	1	0	0	1	26	34	−8
Norway	3	0	0	3	57	116	−59
Paraguay	1	1	0	0	37	27	+10
Portugal	1	0	0	1	31	33	−2
Qatar	1	0	0	1	22	29	−7
Serbia	1	0	0	1	19	35	−16
Slovakia	1	0	0	1	24	32	−8
Slovenia	1	0	0	1	23	42	−19
South Korea	2	0	0	2	51	67	−16
Spain	2	0	0	2	45	82	−37
Sweden	1	0	0	1	15	42	−27
Tunisia	2	0	0	2	39	71	−32
Uruguay	1	0	0	1	18	21	−3
Venezuela	1	1	0	0	28	24	+4
Total	51	7	0	44	1185	1736	−551

=== World Youth Championship ===
Year	Round	Position	W	D	L	GF	GA	GD
(Qatar) 2005	did not qualify							
(Bahrain) 2007	did not qualify							
(Tunisia) 2009	did not qualify							
(Argentina) 2011	Group stage	16th	1	0	5	130	180	−50
(Hungary) 2013	Group stage	24th	0	0	7	161	255	−94
(Russia) 2015	Group stage	24th	0	0	7	139	237	−98
(Georgia (country)) 2017	Round of 16	16th	1	0	6	183	235	−52
(North Macedonia) 2019	Group Stage	22nd	1	0	6	188	230	–42
Total			3	0	31	801	1137	-336

==== Record against other teams at the World Youth Championship ====
National team	Pld	W	D	L	PF	PA	PD
Algeria	2	0	0	2	56	66	−10
Argentina	1	0	0	1	22	30	−8
Belarus	1	0	0	1	23	27	−4
Brazil	1	0	0	1	22	30	−8
Canada	1	1	0	0	46	24	+22
Croatia	1	0	0	1	21	42	−22
Denmark	1	0	0	1	17	38	−21
Egypt	1	0	0	1	22	53	−31
France	1	0	0	1	21	43	−22
Gabon	2	1	0	1	47	39	+8
(Georgia (country)) Georgia	1	1	0	0	29	24	+5
Germany	1	0	0	1	22	39	−17
Japan	2	0	0	2	51	72	−21
Hungary	1	0	0	1	17	37	−20
Iceland	1	0	0	1	22	27	−5
Norway	1	0	0	1	23	38	−15
Poland	2	0	0	2	46	62	−16
Qatar	1	0	0	1	24	35	−11
Russia	1	0	0	1	29	41	−12
Saudi Arabia	1	0	0	1	25	29	−4
Serbia	2	0	0	2	38	68	−30
Slovenia	1	0	0	1	30	35	−5
South Korea	2	0	0	2	56	76	−20
Spain	2	0	0	2	36	59	−23
Sweden	1	0	0	1	17	39	−22
Switzerland	1	0	0	1	16	31	−15
Venezuela	1	0	0	1	27	32	−5
Total	34	3	0	31	801	1137	−336

== Kit suppliers ==
Chile's kit are currently supplied by Select Sport.
