= Pablo Vainstein =

Argentine handball player

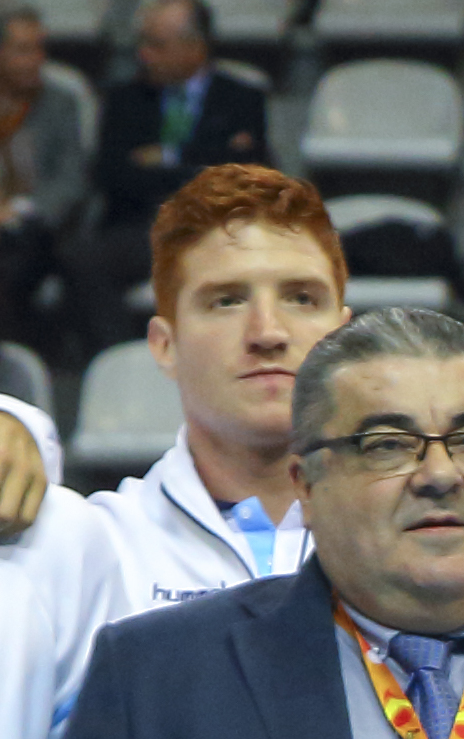

Personal information
- Born: 18 July 1989 (age 37) Buenos Aires, Argentina
- Height: 1.84 m (6 ft 0 in)

Sport
- Sport: Handball
- Position: Right back
- Current club: Ciudad Encantada
- Number: 5
National team
Years	Team	Apps	(Gls)
–	Argentina	40	(55)
Medal record
Pan American Games
Gold medal – first place	2019 Lima	Team
Gold medal – first place	2023 Santiago	Team
Pan American Championship
Gold medal – first place	2018 Greenland
Bronze medal – third place	2016 Argentina
South and Central American Championship
Gold medal – first place	2020 Brazil
Silver medal – second place	2022 Brazil
Silver medal – second place	2024 Argentina
South American Games
Silver medal – second place	2018 Cochabamba	Team

Pablo Vainstein (born 18 July 1989) is an Argentine handball player for Ciudad Encantada and the Argentina men's national handball team.

He played for Argentina in the men's 2016 Rio Summer Olympics handball tournament.
