= Thiagus dos Santos =

Brazilian handball player (born 1989)

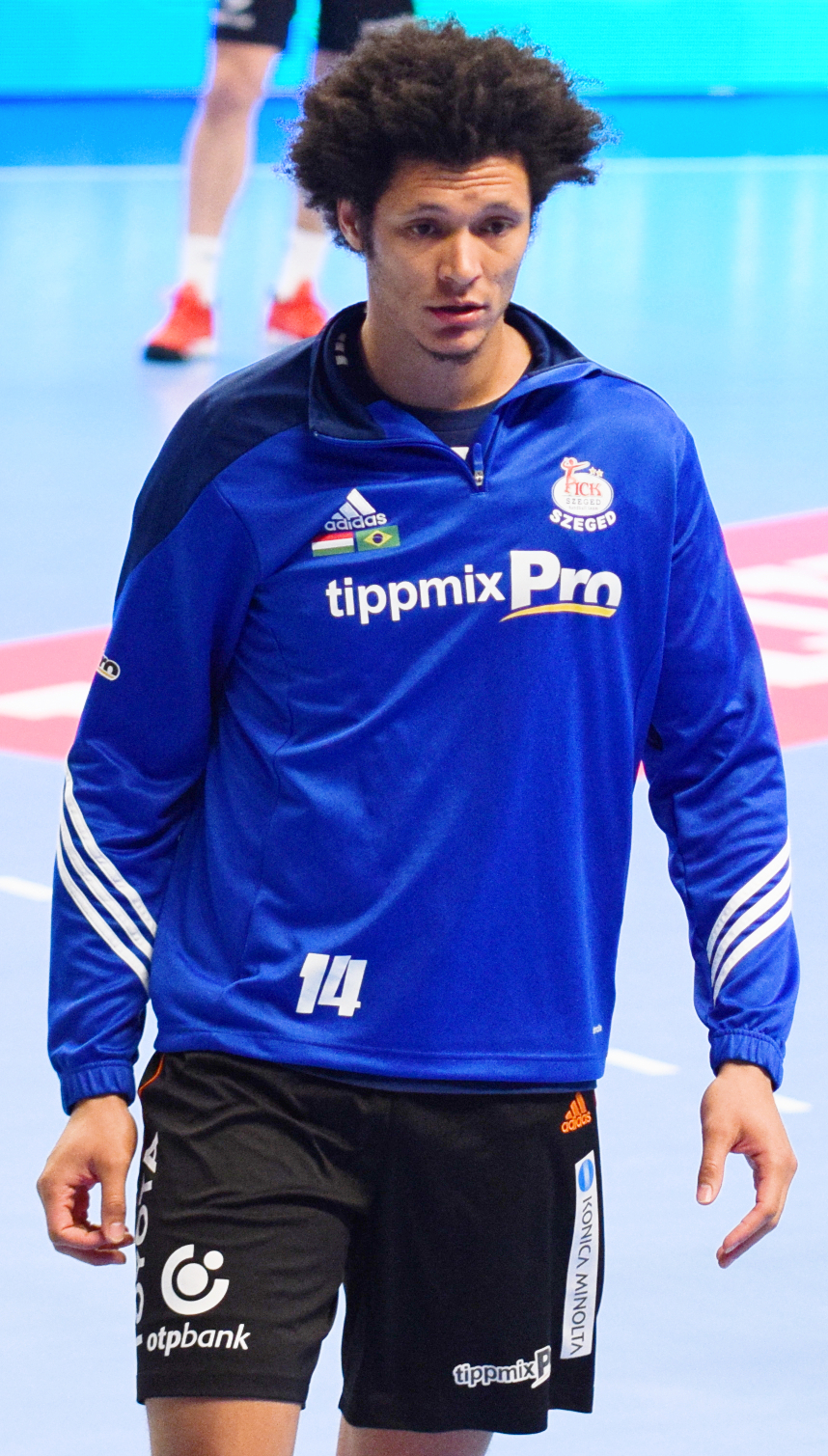
- Dos Santos in 2017

Personal information
- Full name: Thiagus Petrus; Gonçalves dos Santos
- Born: 25 January 1989 (age 37) Juiz de Fora, Brazil
- Height: 1.98 m (6 ft 6 in)

Sport
- Sport: Handball
- Position: Left back
- Current club: One Veszprém
- Number: 22

Senior clubs
- Years: Team
- 2007–2012: Esporte Clube Pinheiros
- 2012–2015: La Rioja
- 2015–2018: SC Pick Szeged
- 2018–2025: FC Barcelona
- 2025–: ONE Veszprém
National team
Years	Team	Apps	(Gls)
2010–	Brazil	139	(236)
Medal record
Pan American Games
Gold medal – first place	2015 Toronto	Team
Silver medal – second place	2011 Guadalajara	Team
Silver medal – second place	2023 Santiago	Team
Bronze medal – third place	2019 Lima	Team
Pan American Championship
Gold medal – first place	2016 Argentina
Silver medal – second place	2012 Argentina
Silver medal – second place	2018 Greenland
South and Central American Championship
Gold medal – first place	2022 Brazil
Gold medal – first place	2024 Argentina
Silver medal – second place	2020 Brazil
Silver medal – second place	2026 Paraguay
South American Games
Gold medal – first place	2018 Cochabamba	Team

Thiagus Petrus Gonçalves dos Santos (born 25 January 1989) is a Brazilian professional handball player for FC Barcelona and the Brazilian national team, of which he is the captain. He is known as a defensive specialist.

== Career ==
In 2002, Thiagus Dos Santos came into contact with handball through some friends. From 2004, he played for Olímpico Atlético Clube from his hometown. In 2006, he joined EC Pinheiros from São Paulo, where he became a part of the senior team a year later. Here, he won three Brazilian championships and the Pan American club Championship.

In 2012, he moved to Europe to join Spanish club Naturhouse La Rioja. His best result here was a second place in the Liga ASOBAL in 2014 and in 2015. Three years later, he joined Hungarian SC Pick Szeged, where he won the Hungarian championship in 2018. The following summer, he returned to Spain to join FC Barcelona, where he won the Spanish league and Cup. He also won the EHF Champions League in 2021, 2022 and 2023.

He won the 2016 Pan American Men's Handball Championship with the Brazilian national team. He has represented Brazil at the 2016, 2020, and 2024 Olympics.

In 2025, he was part of the Brazilian team that reached the quarterfinal of the World Championship for the first time, knocking out Sweden, Norway, and Spain.

== Achievements ==
- EHF Champions League:
  - Winner: 2021, 2022, 2024
- IHF Super Globe:
  - Winner: 2019
- Liga ASOBAL:
  - Winner: 2019, 2020, 2021, 2022, 2023, 2024
- Copa del Rey:
  - Winner: 2019, 2020, 2021, 2022, 2023
- Copa ASOBAL:
  - Winner: 2019, 2020, 2021, 2022, 2023, 2024
- Supercopa ASOBAL:
  - Winner: 2019, 2020, 2021, 2022
- Supercopa Ibérica:
  - Winner: 2022
- Hungarian League:
  - Winner: 2018

Individual awards

- 2018 Pan American Men's Handball Championship: Best left back
- 2022 South and Central American Men's Handball Championship: MVP
- EHF Excellence Awards: Best defender 2022/23
