= Juan Bar =

Argentine handball player

Personal information
- Full name: Juan Manuel Bar
- Born: 29 June 1987 (age 39) Olivos, Argentine
- Height: 1.90 m (6 ft 3 in)

Sport
- Sport: Handball
Medal record
Pan American Games
| Gold medal – first place | 2023 Santiago | Team |
South and Central American Championship
| Gold medal – first place | 2026 Paraguay |
| Silver medal – second place | 2022 Brazil |
| Silver medal – second place | 2024 Argentina |

Juan Manuel Bar (born 29 June 1987) is an Argentine handball player. He competed in the 2020 Summer Olympics.
