= Fanatiz =

Sports streaming service

- Available in: English, Portuguese and Spanish
- Founded: 2016; 10 years ago
- CEO: Matías Rivera
- Industry: Internet television, sports broadcasting
- Website: www.fanatiz.com
- Launched: 15 September 2017; 9 years ago

Fanatiz is an international over-the-top sports streaming service. It focuses on South American sport. It is headquartered in Miami, United States.

== History ==
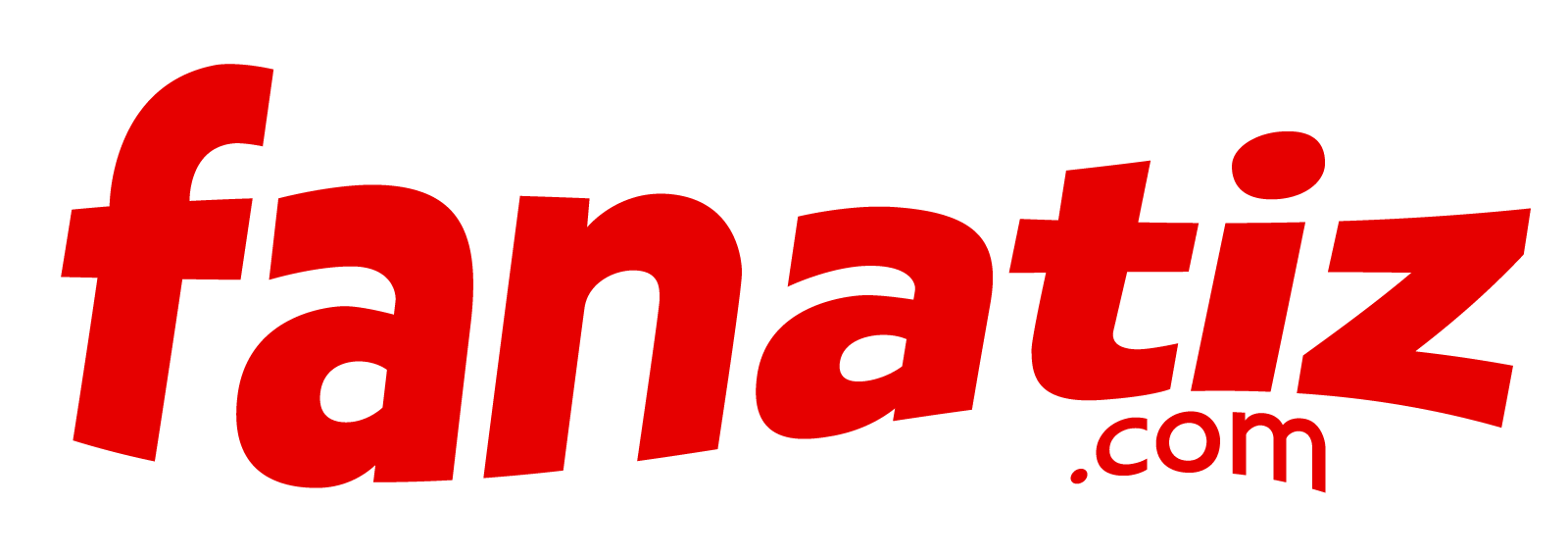
Old Logo from 2017 until June 2020

Matías Rivera founded Fanatiz in 2016 because expats from South America could only watch football from their home countries via illegal websites and in poor quality. He was eager to change this and founded Fanatiz which provides football from across South America to all countries without broadcasting rights and licenses. It started with the Argentine Football League (LPF) in September 2017. In October 2018 they grew to 40 thousand registered users and have grown 30% per month. In August 2020, Brazilian football leagues followed including both the national and state championships. Fanatiz is based on the Nunchee software.

== Rights ==
As of May 2026

=== Chile ===
As platform of the channel CDO+ of Canal del Deporte Olímpico.

- Basketball
  - Liga Nacional de Básquetbol de Chile
  - Copa
  - Supercopa
- Field Hockey
  - League
- Handball
  - League

=== Football ===
- Argentina
  - Argentine Primera División
  - Copa Argentina
  - Copa de la Liga Profesional
- Brazil
  - Campeonato Brasileiro Série A
  - Campeonato Brasileiro Série B
  - State football leagues in Brazil (Selected Games)
- Colombia
  - Categoría Primera A
- Paraguay
  - División de Honor
- Peru
  - Peruvian Primera División

=== Handball ===
==== South and Central America Handball Confederation ====
Fanatiz has since 2021 the rights for all competitions from the South and Central America Handball Confederation.

- National teams
  - Adult South and Central Championship
    - Men: 2022
    - Women: 2021, 2022
  - Central American Handball Championship
    - Men: 2021, 2023
    - Women: 2023
  - Junior South and Central Championship
    - Men: 2022
    - Women: 2022
  - Youth South and Central Championship
    - Men: 2022
    - Women: 2022
  - IHF Trophy (South and Central American)
- Beach
  - Adult South and Central Championship: 2022
  - Junior South and Central Championship: 2022
  - Youth South and Central Championship: 2022
- Clubs
  - Men: 2022
  - Women: 2022

==== Countries ====
- Chile
  - League via CDO+
- Uruguay
  - Championship
