= Rodrigo Salinas Muñoz =

Chilean handball player (born 1989)

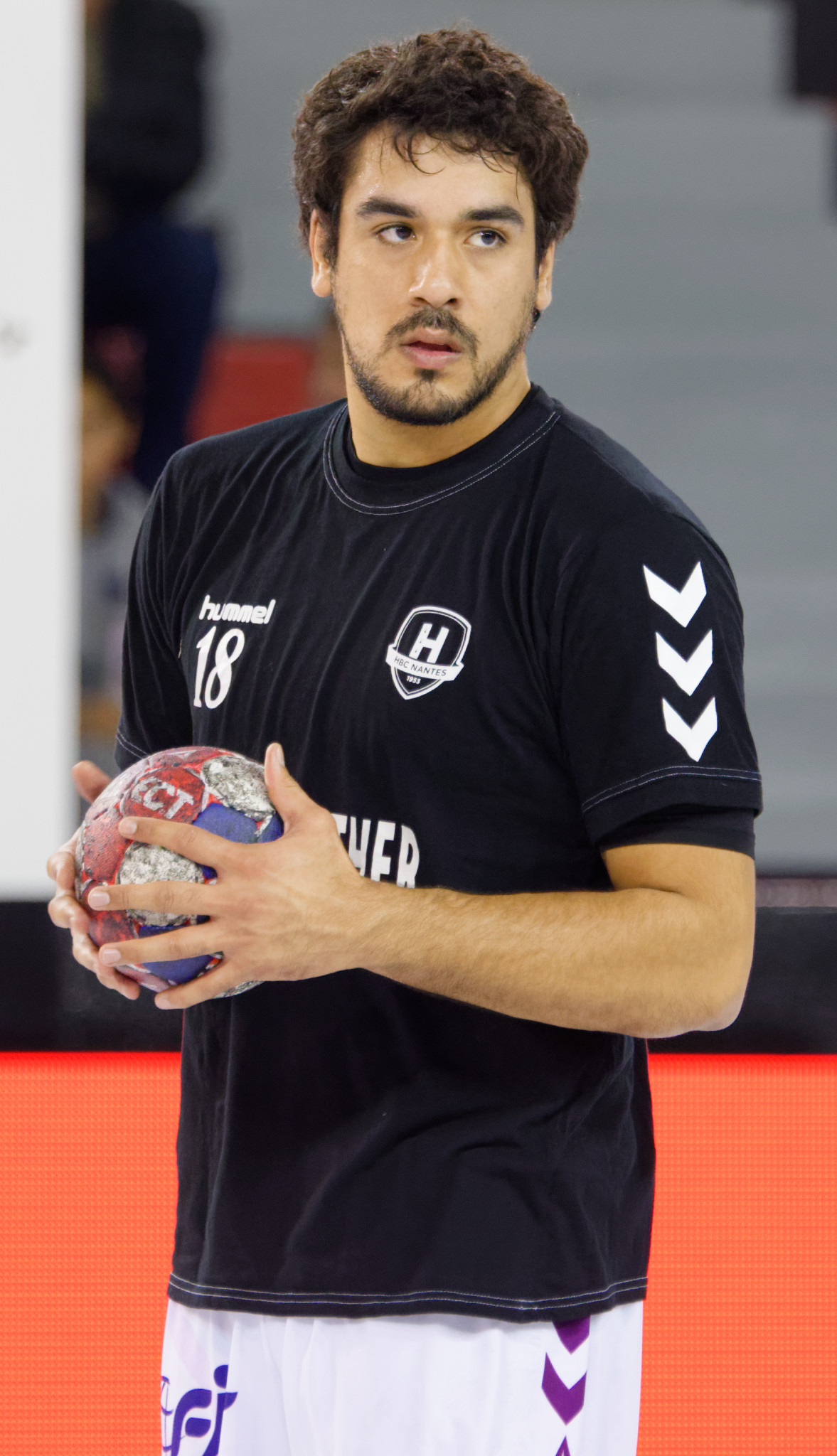

Personal information
- Full name: Rodrigo Alonso Salinas Muñoz
- Born: 25 February 1989 (age 37) Viña del Mar, Chile
- Height: 1.88 m (6 ft 2 in)

Sport
- Sport: Handball
- Position: Right back
- Current club: Bidasoa Irún
- Number: 23

Senior clubs
- Years: Team
- 2006-2008: Club Winterhill
- 2008-2010: Escubal Badajoz
- 2010-2011: BM Huesca
- 2011–2012: CB Torrevieja
- 2012–2014: BM Granollers
- 2014–2015: CS Steaua București
- 2015–2016: HBC Nantes
- 2016–2017: Chartres Métropole
- 2017–: Bidasoa Irún
National team
Years	Team	Apps	(Gls)
–	Chile	128	(440)
Medal record
Pan American Games
Silver medal – second place	2019 Lima	Team
Bronze medal – third place	2011 Guadalajara	Team
Bronze medal – third place	2015 Toronto	Team
Bronze medal – third place	2023 Santiago	Team
Pan American Championship
Silver medal – second place	2016 Argentina
Bronze medal – third place	2010 Chile
Bronze medal – third place	2012 Argentina
Bronze medal – third place	2014 Uruguay
Bronze medal – third place	2018 Greenland
South and Central American Championship
Bronze medal – third place	2022 Brazil
Bronze medal – third place	2024 Argentina
Bronze medal – third place	2026 Paraguay
South American Games
Silver medal – second place	2022 Asunción	Team
Bronze medal – third place	2018 Cochabamba	Team
- Updated on 27 January 2025

Rodrigo Alonso Salinas Muñoz (born 25 February 1989) is a Chilean handball player for Bidasoa Irún and the Chilean national team.

He ranked second in the 2014 Pan American Men's Handball Championship's top goalscorers list.

Salinas reached third place with BM Granollers in the 2013/14 season of ASOBAL, being the leading scorer on the team with 128 goals.

His brother Esteban Salinas also plays handball.

== Achievements ==
- Liga ASOBAL:
  - Bronze Medalist: 2014
- División de Plata:
  - Silver Medalist: 2011
- Copa del Rey de Balonmano:
  - Finalist: 2014
- Pan American Handball Championship:
  - Bronze Medalist: 2010, 2012, 2014

== Individual awards ==
- All-Star Right Back of the Pan American Handball Championship:
  - 2014, 2016
- Top scorer of the 2016 World Olympic Qualification 1 with 20 goals.
- 2020 South and Central American Men's Handball Championship: Best right back
- 2022 South and Central American Men's Handball Championship: Best right back
