= Leonel Maciel (handballer) =

Argentine handball player

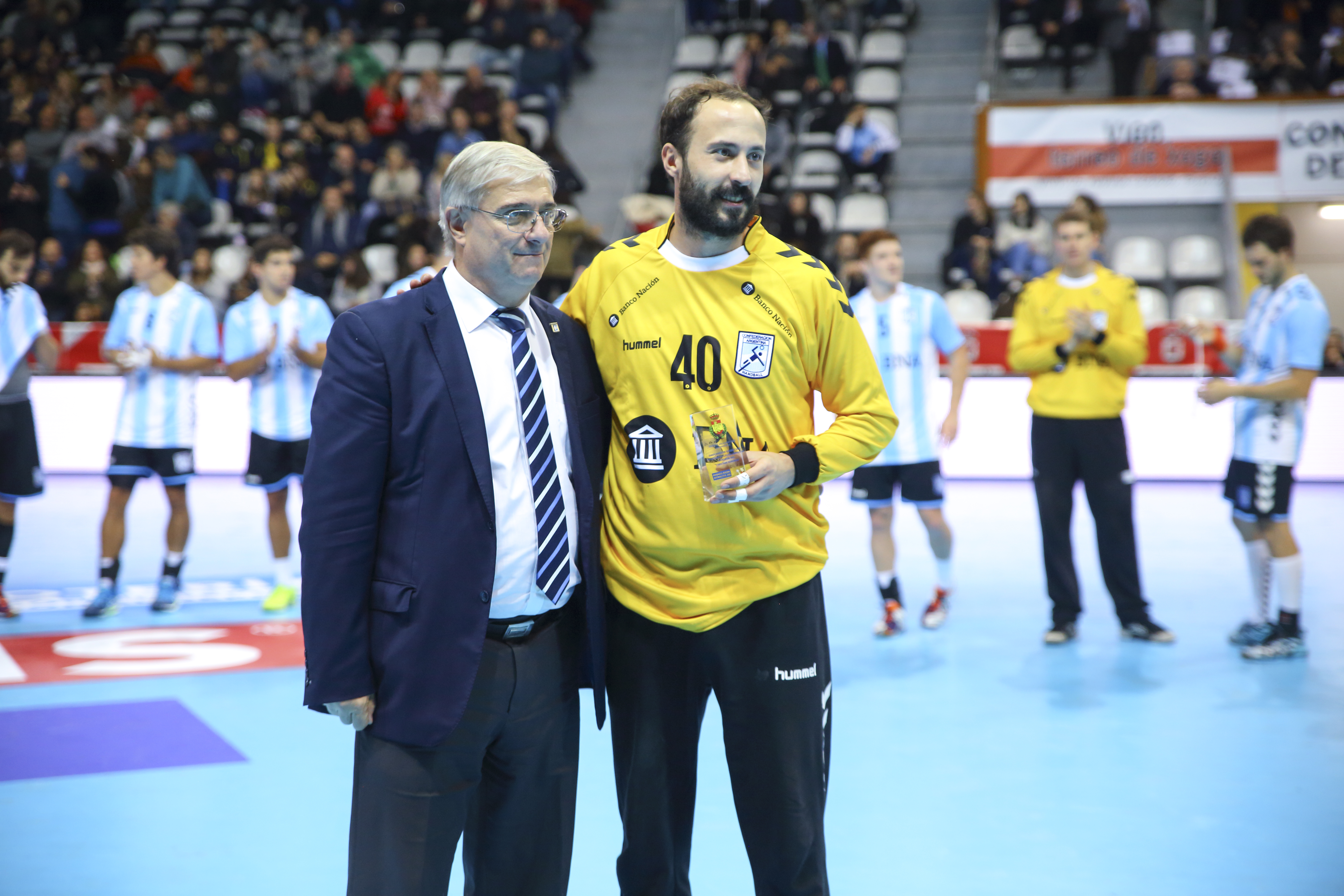

Personal information
- Full name: Leonel Sergio Carlos Maciel
- Born: 4 January 1989 (age 37) Morón, Argentina
- Height: 1.92 m (6 ft 4 in)

Sport
- Sport: Handball
- Position: Goalkeeper
- Current club: Sporting CP
- Number: 40

Senior clubs
- Years: Team
- 2005–2008: Dorrego Handball
- 2008–2010: SAG Polvorines
- 2010–2012: Octavio Pilotes Posada
- 2012–2015: SAG Villa Ballester
- 2015–2017: Club Balonmano Zamora
- 2017–2021: BM Ciudad Encantada
- 2021–2022: FC Barcelona
- 2022–2024: Sporting CP
- 2024–: Bidasoa Irún
National team
Years	Team	Apps	(Gls)
–	Argentina	121	(14)
Medal record
Pan American Games
Gold medal – first place	2019 Lima	Team
Gold medal – first place	2023 Santiago	Team
Pan American Championship
Gold medal – first place	2018 Greenland
South and Central American Championship
Gold medal – first place	2020 Brazil
Silver medal – second place	2022 Brazil
Silver medal – second place	2024 Argentina
South American Games
Gold medal – first place	2022 Asunción	Team
Silver medal – second place	2018 Cochabamba	Team
- Updated on 30 December 2024

Leonel Sergio Carlos Maciel (born 4 January 1989) is an Argentine handball player for Sporting CP and the Argentine national team.

He represented Argentina at the 2019 and 2021 World Championships.

== Individual awards ==
- 2022 South and Central American Men's Handball Championship: Best goalkeeper
