= César Almeida (handballer) =

Brazilian handball player (born 1989)

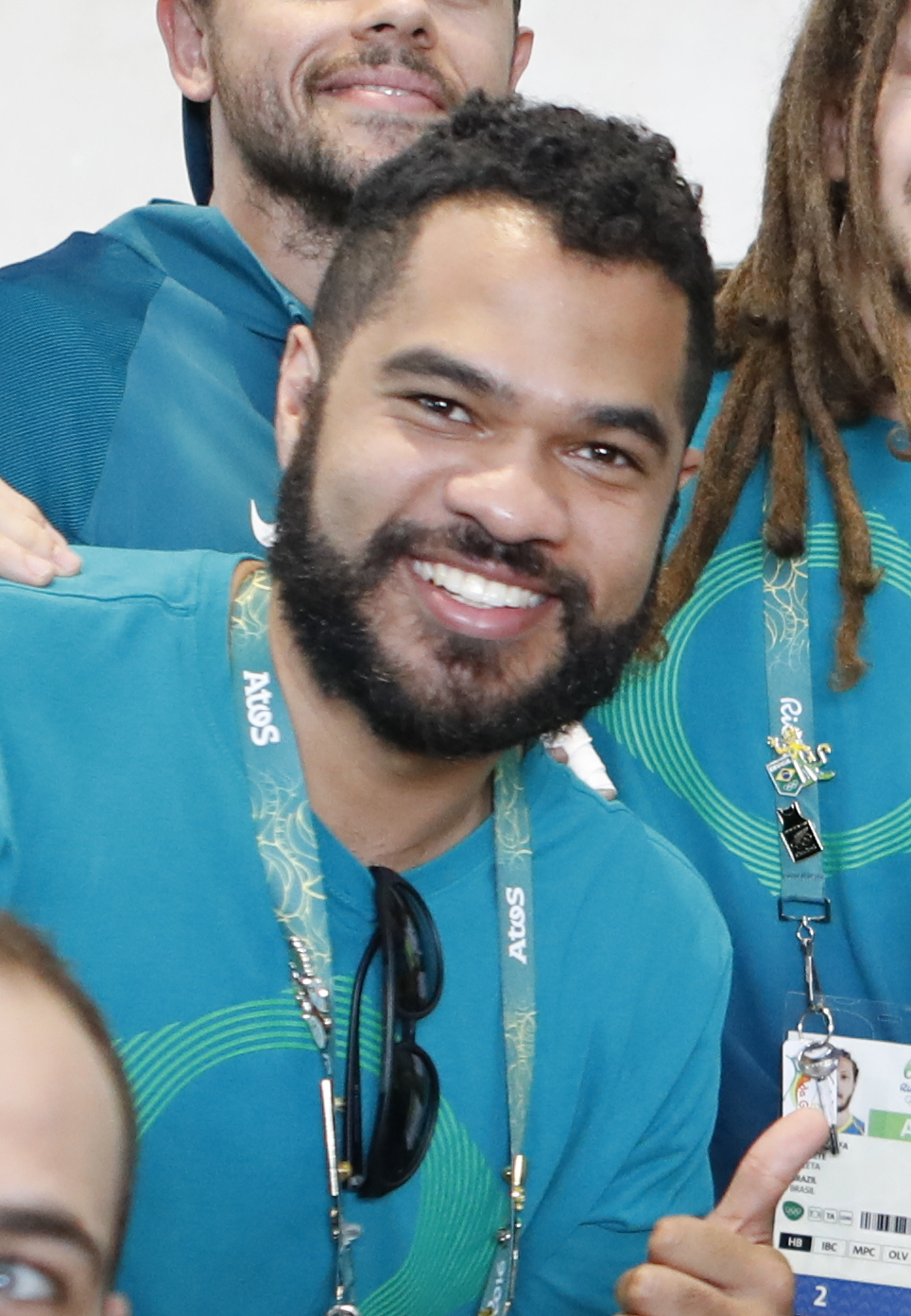
- Almeida in 2016

Personal information
- Full name: César Augusto Oliveira de Almeida
- Born: 6 January 1989 (age 37) São Paulo, Brazil
- Height: 1.87 m (6 ft 2 in)

Sport
- Sport: Handball
- Position: Goalkeeper
- Current club: Fenix Toulouse Handball
- Number: 89

Senior clubs
- Years: Team
- –2013: EC Pinheiros
- 2013–2015: AD Ciudad de Guadalajara
- 2015–2016: BM Granollers
- 2016–2017: ØIF Arendal
- 2017–2020: BM Granollers
- 2020-: Fenix Toulouse Handball
National team
Years	Team	Apps	(Gls)
–	Brazil	98	(1)
Medal record
Pan American Games
Gold medal – first place	2015 Toronto	Team
Bronze medal – third place	2019 Lima	Team
Pan American Championship
Gold medal – first place	2016 Argentina
Silver medal – second place	2014 Uruguay
Silver medal – second place	2018 Greenland
South and Central American Championship
Gold medal – first place	2022 Brazil
South American Games
Gold medal – first place	2014 Santiago	Team
Gold medal – first place	2018 Cochabamba	Team
- Updated on 14. December 2024

César Augusto Oliveira de Almeida (born 6 January 1989) is a Brazilian handball goalkeeper for BM Granollers and the Brazilian national team.

He competed at the 2013 and 2015 World Championships and won a gold medal at the 2015 Pan American Games.

On 23 May 2016, Almeida signed for the Norwegian club ØIF Arendal.

He competed for Brazil at the 2016 Summer Olympics.
