= Ignacio Pizarro =

Argentine handball player

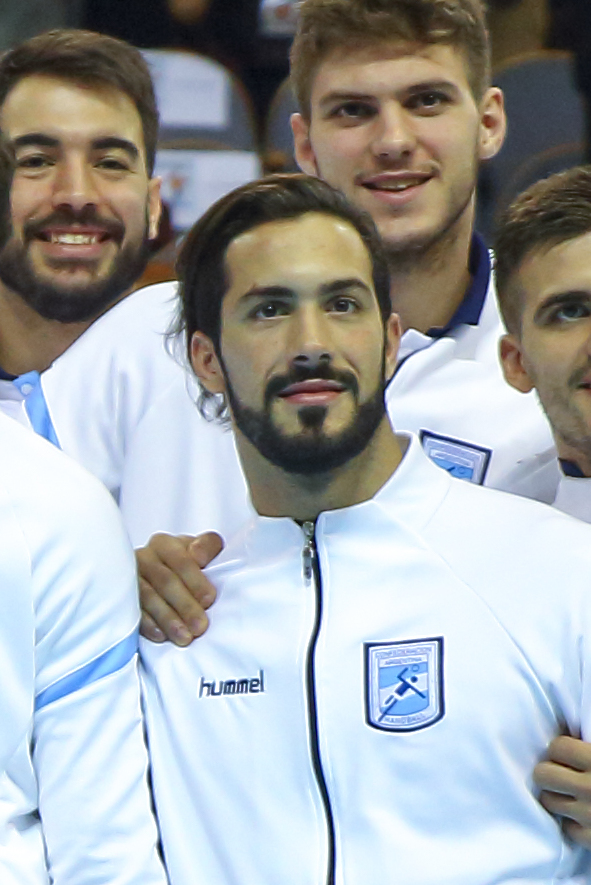

Personal information
- Full name: Ignacio Nicolás Pizarro
- Born: 8 February 1990 (age 36) Lanús, Argentina
- Height: 1.78 m (5 ft 10 in)

Sport
- Sport: Handball
- Position: Left wing
- Current club: UNLu
National team
Years	Team	Apps	(Gls)
–	Argentina	31	(68)
Medal record
Pan American Games
Gold medal – first place	2019 Lima	Team
Gold medal – first place	2023 Santiago	Team
Pan American Championship
Gold medal – first place	2018 Greenland
South and Central American Championship
Gold medal – first place	2020 Brazil
Silver medal – second place	2022 Brazil
Silver medal – second place	2024 Argentina
South American Games
Silver medal – second place	2018 Cochabamba	Team

Ignacio Nicolás Pizarro (born 8 February 1990) is an Argentine handball player for UNLu and the Argentine national team.

He represented Argentina at the 2019 World Men's Handball Championship.

== Individual awards ==
- 2020 South and Central American Men's Handball Championship: Best left wing and top scorer
- 2022 South and Central American Men's Handball Championship: Best left wing
