= Ramiro Martínez (handballer) =

Argentine handball player

Personal information
- Born: 22 July 1995 (age 31) Buenos Aires, Argentina
- Height: 1.80 m (5 ft 11 in)

Sport
- Sport: Handball
- Position: Right wing
- Current club: BM Benidorm
- Number: 20
National team
Years	Team	Apps	(Gls)
–	Argentina	16	(30)
Medal record
South and Central American Championship
Gold medal – first place	2020 Brazil
Gold medal – first place	2026 Paraguay
Silver medal – second place	2022 Brazil
Silver medal – second place	2024 Argentina
Pan American Junior Championship
Silver medal – second place	2015 Brazil

Ramiro Martínez (born 22 July 1995) is an Argentine handball player for Balonmano Benidorm and the Argentine national team.

He represented Argentina at the 2019 World Men's Handball Championship.
