= Esteban Salinas =

Chilean handball player (born 1992)

Personal information
- Full name: Esteban Joaquín Salinas
- Born: 18 January 1992 (age 34) Viña del Mar, Chile
- Height: 1.80 m (5 ft 11 in)

Sport
- Sport: Handball
- Position: Pivot
- Current club: Bidasoa Irún
- Number: 17

Senior clubs
- Years: Team
- 2009–2012: Club Winterhill
- 2012–2015: CB Zamora
- 2015–2018: BM Benidorm
- 2018–2020: Bidasoa Irún
- 2020–2023: BM Granollers
- 2023–: Bidasoa Irún
National team
Years	Team	Apps	(Gls)
–	Chile	62	(118)
Medal record
Pan American Games
Silver medal – second place	2019 Lima	Team
Bronze medal – third place	2011 Guadalajara	Team
Bronze medal – third place	2015 Toronto	Team
Bronze medal – third place	2023 Santiago	Team
Pan American Championship
Silver medal – second place	2016 Argentina
Bronze medal – third place	2018 Greenland
South and Central American Championship
Bronze medal – third place	2022 Brazil
Bronze medal – third place	2024 Argentina
South American Games
Silver medal – second place	2022 Asunción	Team
Bronze medal – third place	2018 Cochabamba	Team

Esteban Joaquín Salinas (born 18 January 1992) is a Chilean handball player for Bidasoa Irún and the Chilean national team.

His brother Rodrigo Salinas Muñoz also plays handball.

== Individual awards and achievements ==
- 2016 Pan American Men's Handball Championship: Best Pivot
- 2018 Pan American Men's Handball Championship: Best Pivot
- 2020 South and Central American Men's Handball Championship: Best Pivot
