= Thiago Ponciano =

Brazilian handball player (born 1994)

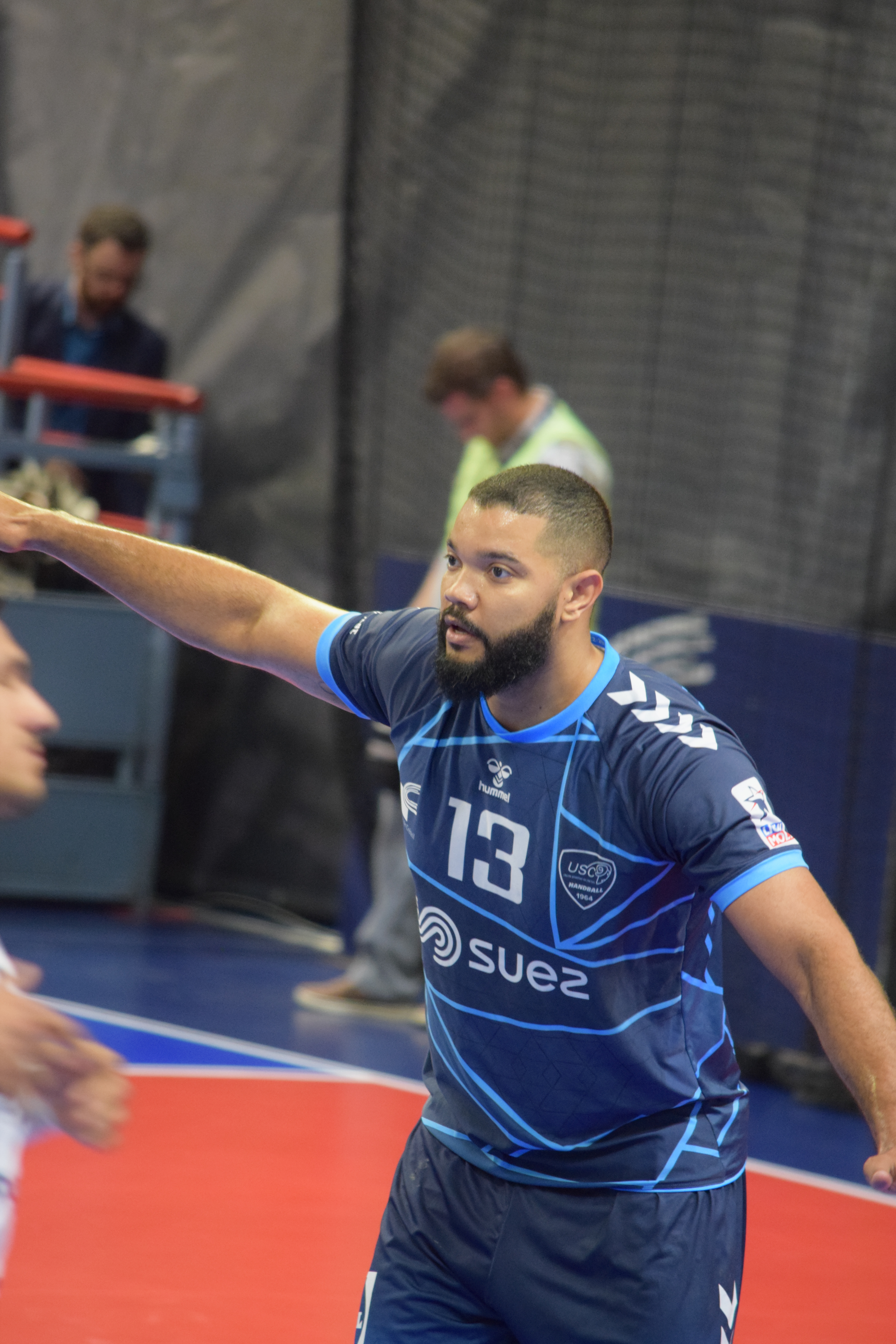

Personal information
- Full name: Thiago Alves Ponciano
- Born: 8 May 1994 (age 32) Foz do Iguaçu, Brazil
- Height: 1.93 m (6 ft 4 in)

Sport
- Sport: Handball
- Position: Left back
- Current club: Ciudad Encantada
- Number: 13
National team
Years	Team	Apps	(Gls)
–	Brazil	35	(20)
Medal record
Pan American Games
Bronze medal – third place	2019 Lima	Team
Pan American Championship
Silver medal – second place	2018 Greenland
South and Central American Championship
Gold medal – first place	2022 Brazil
South American Games
Gold medal – first place	2018 Cochabamba	Team
Pan American Junior Championship
Gold medal – first place	2015 Brazil

Thiago Alves Ponciano (born 8 May 1994) is a Brazilian handball player for Ciudad Encantada and the Brazilian national team.

He participated at the 2017 World Men's Handball Championship.
