= James Parker (handballer) =

Argentine handball player

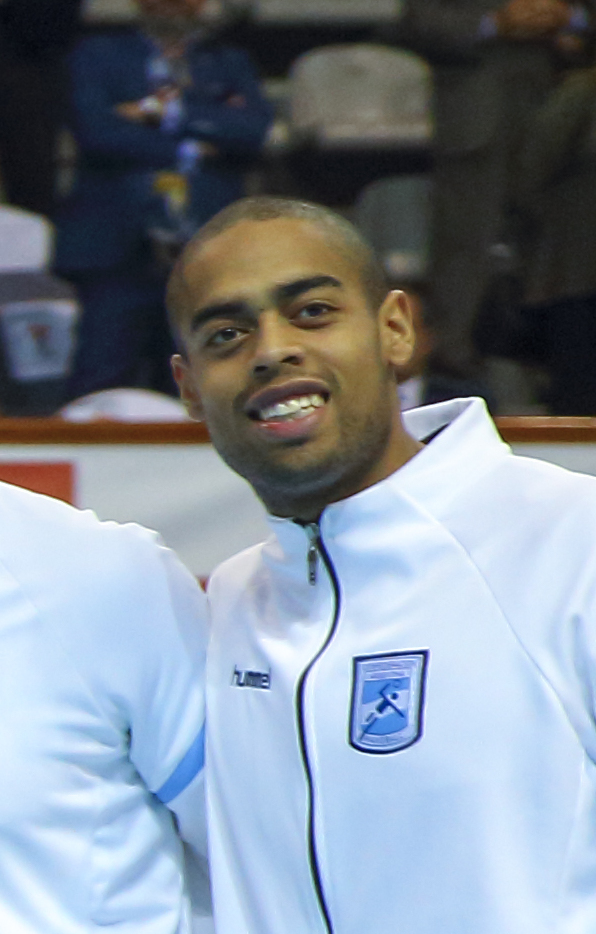
- Parker in 2018

Personal information
- Full name: James Lewis Parker
- Born: 9 June 1994 (age 32) San Nicolás, Argentina
- Height: 1.87 m (6 ft 2 in)

Sport
- Sport: Handball
- Position: Left back
- Current club: Club Balonmano Eón Alicante
- Number: 13

Senior clubs
- Years: Team
- –2018: SAG Polvorines
- 2018–2019: Ciudad Real
- 2019–2022: BM Benidorm
- 2023–2024: Zamalek SC
- 2024–: Club Balonmano Eón Alicante
National team
Years	Team	Apps	(Gls)
2018–	Argentina	33	(55)
Medal record
Pan American Games
Gold medal – first place	2023 Santiago	Team
South and Central American Championship
Silver medal – second place	2022 Brazil
Silver medal – second place	2024 Argentina
South American Games
Gold medal – first place	2022 Asunción	Team
- Updated on 25 May 2025

James Lewis Parker (born 9 June 1994) is an Argentine handball player for Club Balonmano Eón Alicante and the Argentina national team.

== Early life ==
Parker was born in San Nicolás de los Arroyos, Buenos Aires, and grew up in San Luis. His father, also named James Parker, played basketball in Argentina.

== Individual awards ==
- 2022 South and Central American Men's Handball Championship: Best left back
