= Erwin Feuchtmann =

Chilean handball player (born 1990)

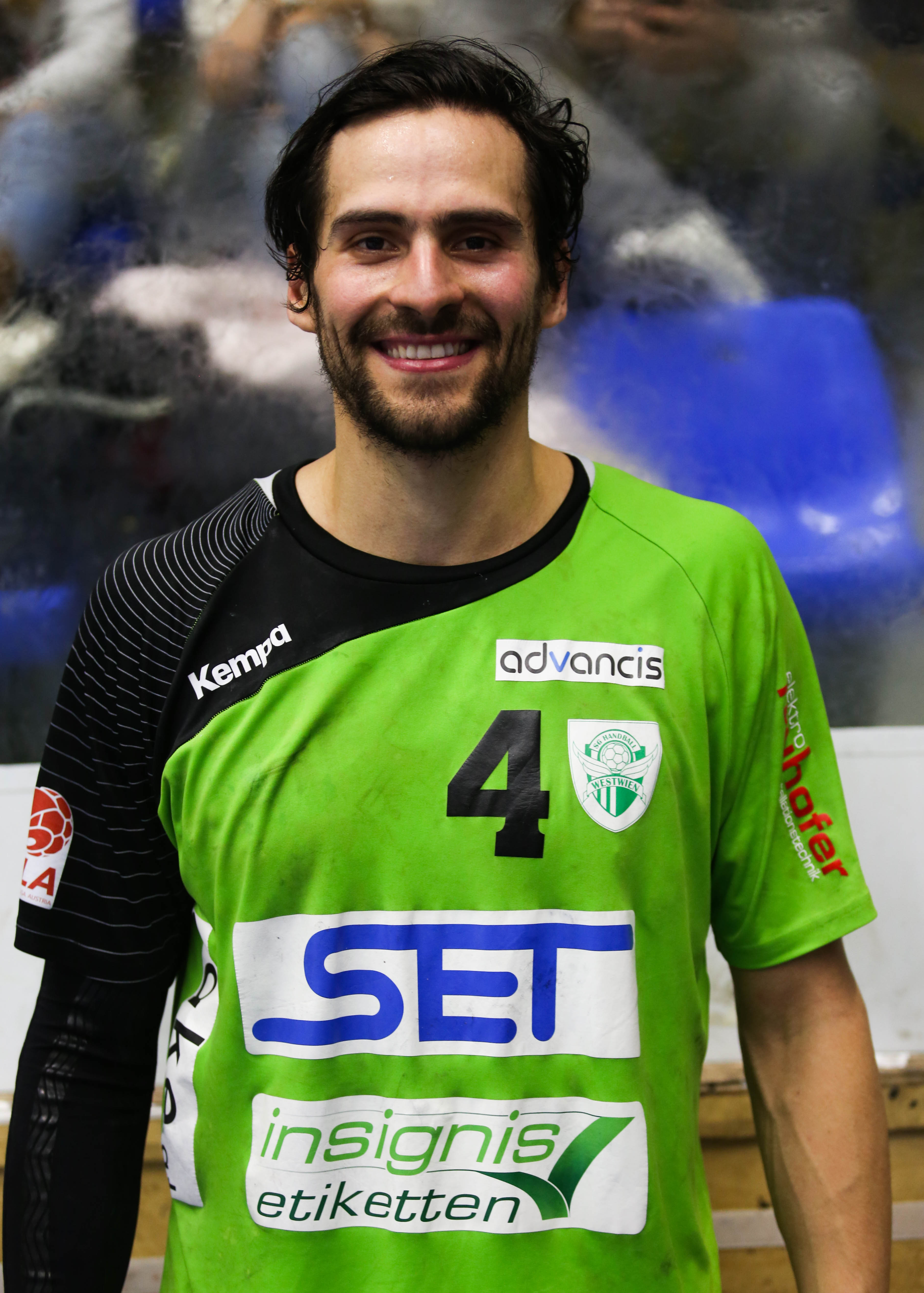
- Feuchtmann with West Wien in 2016

Personal information
- Full name: Erwin Jan Feuchtmann Pérez
- Born: 2 May 1990 (age 36) Punta Arenas, Chile
- Height: 1.90 m (6 ft 3 in)

Sport
- Sport: Handball
- Position: Left back
- Current club: Fenix Toulouse
- Number: 4

Senior clubs
- Years: Team
- 2004–2007: Universidad de Chile
- 2007–2008: CB Petrer
- 2008–2009: BM Ciudad De Puertollano
- 2009–2011: Artepref Villa de Aranda
- 2011–2012: HC Aschersleben
- 2012: SV 04 Plauen-Oberlosa
- 2013: HSG Hohn/Elsdorf
- 2013–2014: HC Odorheiu Secuiesc
- 2014–2015: Beşiktaş Safi Çimento
- 2015–2016: TBV Lemgo
- 2016–2017: SG West Wien
- 2017–2018: VfL Gummersbach
- 2018–2019: Istres Provence Handball
- 2019–2021: Abanca Ademar León
- 2021–: Fenix Toulouse
National team
Years	Team	Apps	(Gls)
2010-	Chile	93	(515)
Medal record
Pan American Games
Silver medal – second place	2019 Lima	Team
Bronze medal – third place	2011 Guadalajara	Team
Bronze medal – third place	2023 Santiago	Team
Pan American Championship
Silver medal – second place	2016 Argentina
Bronze medal – third place	2018 Greenland
South and Central American Championship
Bronze medal – third place	2022 Brazil
Bronze medal – third place	2024 Argentina
Bronze medal – third place	2026 Paraguay
South American Games
Silver medal – second place	2022 Asunción	Team
Bronze medal – third place	2018 Cochabamba	Team
Bolivarian Games
Gold medal – first place	2022 Valledupar	Team

Erwin Jan Feuchtmann Pérez is a Chilean handballer for Ademar Leon and the Chilean national team.

His siblings Emil, Harald and Inga Feuchtmann are also handballers playing for the Chilean national handball team.

Feuchtmann participated at the 2017 World Men's Handball Championship.

== Individual awards ==
- 2019 Pan American Games: Top scorer
- 2022 South and Central American Men's Handball Championship:Top scorer
