= 2014 Pan American Men's Handball Championship =

Tournament details
- Host country: Uruguay
- Venue(s): 1 (in 1 host city)
- Dates: 23–29 June
- Teams: 8 (from 1 confederation)

Final positions
- Champions: Argentina (6th title)
- Runner-up: Brazil
- Third place: Chile
- Fourth place: Uruguay

Tournament statistics
- Matches played: 20
- Goals scored: 1,113 (55.65 per match)
- Top scorer(s): (Greenland) Akutaaneq Kreutzmann (43 goals)

The 2014 Pan American Men's Handball Championship, was the 16th official competition for senior men's national handball teams of North, Center, Caribbean and South America. It was held from 23 to 29 June 2014 in Uruguay. It also acted as the qualifying competition for the 2015 World Men's Handball Championship, securing three vacancies for the World Championship.

Argentina won the tournament for the third consecutive and sixth time total after defeating Brazil 30–19 in the final.

== Participating teams ==
- Argentina
- Brazil
- Chile
- Greenland
- Guatemala
- Mexico
- Uruguay
- United States
- Venezuela was originally qualified but withdrew one day prior to the tournament.
- Cuba was originally qualified but withdrew. The organizing committee tried to find a replacement but Paraguay rejected this offer.

== Referees ==
Six referee pairs were selected.

Referees
Argentina	Carlos Marina; Darío Minore
Brazil	Nilson Menezes; Rogério Pinto
Croatia	Matija Gubica; Boris Milošević

Referees
Puerto Rico	Enrique Pérez; José Guzmán
Uruguay	Gabriel González; Camilo Prieto
United States	Lars Jorgensen; Christian Posch

== Preliminary round ==
The draw was held on 24 May 2014.

All times are local (UTC−3).

=== Group A ===
Team	Pld	W	D	L	GF	GA	GD	Pts
Brazil	3	3	0	0	114	44	+70	6
Uruguay (H)	3	2	0	1	78	74	+4	4
United States	3	1	0	2	74	83	−9	2
Guatemala	3	0	0	3	59	124	−65	0

(H) Hosts

24 June 2014; 18:00	United States	17–28	Brazil	Estadio Sergio Matto, Canelones; Attendance: 300; Referees: Marina, Minore (ARG)
24 June 2014; 18:00	Elzoghby 4	(8–15)	Gama 5	Estadio Sergio Matto, Canelones; Attendance: 300; Referees: Marina, Minore (ARG)
24 June 2014; 18:00	3× (yellow card) 4× (suspension)	Report	2× (yellow card) 3× (suspension)	Estadio Sergio Matto, Canelones; Attendance: 300; Referees: Marina, Minore (ARG)

24 June 2014; 20:00	Uruguay	36–19	Guatemala	Estadio Sergio Matto, Canelones; Attendance: 700; Referees: Gubica, Milošević (CRO)
24 June 2014; 20:00	Fabra 8	(17–9)	Lun 5	Estadio Sergio Matto, Canelones; Attendance: 700; Referees: Gubica, Milošević (CRO)
24 June 2014; 20:00	3× (yellow card) 1× (suspension)	Report	2× (yellow card) 7× (suspension)	Estadio Sergio Matto, Canelones; Attendance: 700; Referees: Gubica, Milošević (CRO)

25 June 2014; 16:00	Brazil	54–12	Guatemala	Estadio Sergio Matto, Canelones; Referees: Posch, Jorgensen (USA)
25 June 2014; 16:00	Freitas 14	(28–4)	V. Morales 4	Estadio Sergio Matto, Canelones; Referees: Posch, Jorgensen (USA)
25 June 2014; 16:00	2× (yellow card) 1× (suspension)	Report	1× (yellow card) 4× (suspension)	Estadio Sergio Matto, Canelones; Referees: Posch, Jorgensen (USA)

25 June 2014; 20:00	Uruguay	27–23	United States	Estadio Sergio Matto, Canelones; Referees: Gubica, Milošević (CRO)
25 June 2014; 20:00	Gamiz 9	(15–5)	Hines, Elzoghby 5	Estadio Sergio Matto, Canelones; Referees: Gubica, Milošević (CRO)
25 June 2014; 20:00	3× (yellow card) 3× (suspension)	Report	2× (yellow card) 3× (suspension)	Estadio Sergio Matto, Canelones; Referees: Gubica, Milošević (CRO)

26 June 2014; 14:00	United States	34–28	Guatemala	Estadio Sergio Matto, Canelones; Attendance: 200; Referees: Pérez, Guzmán (PUR)
26 June 2014; 14:00	Elzoghby 10	(13–12)	V. Morales 6	Estadio Sergio Matto, Canelones; Attendance: 200; Referees: Pérez, Guzmán (PUR)
26 June 2014; 14:00	3× (yellow card) 7× (suspension) 1× (red card)	Report	2× (yellow card) 3× (suspension)	Estadio Sergio Matto, Canelones; Attendance: 200; Referees: Pérez, Guzmán (PUR)

26 June 2014; 20:00	Uruguay	15–32	Brazil	Estadio Sergio Matto, Canelones; Referees: Marina, Minore (ARG)
26 June 2014; 20:00	five players 2	(7–15)	Freitas 7	Estadio Sergio Matto, Canelones; Referees: Marina, Minore (ARG)
26 June 2014; 20:00	2× (yellow card) 3× (suspension)	Report	3× (yellow card) 1× (red card)	Estadio Sergio Matto, Canelones; Referees: Marina, Minore (ARG)

=== Group B ===
Team	Pld	W	D	L	GF	GA	GD	Pts
Argentina	3	3	0	0	100	55	+45	6
Chile	3	2	0	1	82	76	+6	4
Greenland	3	1	0	2	77	86	−9	2
Mexico	3	0	0	3	58	100	−42	0

23 June 2014; 16:30	Chile	34–18	Mexico	Estadio Sergio Matto, Canelones; Attendance: 200; Referees: González, Prieto (URU)
23 June 2014; 16:30	E. Salinas 7	(15–8)	Bermúdez 7	Estadio Sergio Matto, Canelones; Attendance: 200; Referees: González, Prieto (URU)
23 June 2014; 16:30	3× (yellow card)	Report	1× (yellow card) 3× (suspension)	Estadio Sergio Matto, Canelones; Attendance: 200; Referees: González, Prieto (URU)

23 June 2014; 18:30	Argentina	33–20	Greenland	Estadio Sergio Matto, Canelones; Referees: Pinto, Menezes (BRA)
23 June 2014; 18:30	Pizarro 6	(14–12)	Ak. Kreutzmann 6	Estadio Sergio Matto, Canelones; Referees: Pinto, Menezes (BRA)
23 June 2014; 18:30	3× (yellow card) 4× (suspension)	Report	2× (yellow card) 6× (suspension)	Estadio Sergio Matto, Canelones; Referees: Pinto, Menezes (BRA)

25 June 2014; 14:00	Argentina	33–16	Mexico	Estadio Sergio Matto, Canelones; Attendance: 400; Referees: Pérez, Guzmán (PUR)
25 June 2014; 14:00	F. Fernández, Cangiani 6	(18–8)	Ab. Villalobos 4	Estadio Sergio Matto, Canelones; Attendance: 400; Referees: Pérez, Guzmán (PUR)
25 June 2014; 14:00	1× (yellow card) 1× (suspension)	Report	3× (yellow card) 3× (suspension) 1× (red card)	Estadio Sergio Matto, Canelones; Attendance: 400; Referees: Pérez, Guzmán (PUR)

25 June 2014; 18:00	Greenland	24–29	Chile	Estadio Sergio Matto, Canelones; Referees: Marina, Minore (ARG)
25 June 2014; 18:00	Ak. Kreutzmann 7	(12–13)	R. Salinas 10	Estadio Sergio Matto, Canelones; Referees: Marina, Minore (ARG)
25 June 2014; 18:00	2× (yellow card) 8× (suspension)	Report	2× (yellow card) 8× (suspension)	Estadio Sergio Matto, Canelones; Referees: Marina, Minore (ARG)

26 June 2014; 16:00	Greenland	33–24	Mexico	Estadio Sergio Matto, Canelones; Attendance: 650; Referees: Posch, Jorgensen (USA)
26 June 2014; 16:00	Ak. Kreutzmann 11	(17–12)	Acuña 8	Estadio Sergio Matto, Canelones; Attendance: 650; Referees: Posch, Jorgensen (USA)
26 June 2014; 16:00	3× (yellow card) 4× (suspension)	Report	2× (yellow card) 2× (suspension)	Estadio Sergio Matto, Canelones; Attendance: 650; Referees: Posch, Jorgensen (USA)

26 June 2014; 18:00	Argentina	34–19	Chile	Estadio Sergio Matto, Canelones; Attendance: 800; Referees: Gubica, Milošević (CRO)
26 June 2014; 18:00	Pizarro 8	(16–12)	Ceballos 5	Estadio Sergio Matto, Canelones; Attendance: 800; Referees: Gubica, Milošević (CRO)
26 June 2014; 18:00	3× (yellow card) 4× (suspension)	Report	3× (yellow card) 6× (suspension)	Estadio Sergio Matto, Canelones; Attendance: 800; Referees: Gubica, Milošević (CRO)

== Knockout stage ==
All times are local (UTC−3).

=== Championship bracket ===
Semifinals
28 June
Brazil	36
Chile	28
28 June
Argentina	30
Uruguay	16

Final
29 June
Brazil	19
Argentina	30
Third-place game
29 June
Chile	25
Uruguay	24

5–8th-place bracket

Semifinals
28 June
United States	41
Mexico	28
28 June
Greenland	44
Guatemala	22

Fifth-place game
29 June
United States	32
Greenland	43
Seventh-place game
29 June
Mexico	37
Guatemala	16

==== 5–8th-place semifinals ====
28 June 2014; 16:00	Greenland	44–22	Guatemala	Estadio Sergio Matto, Canelones; Attendance: 150; Referees: Marina, Minore (ARG)
28 June 2014; 16:00	Ak. Kreutzmann 9	(25–12)	Stolz 7	Estadio Sergio Matto, Canelones; Attendance: 150; Referees: Marina, Minore (ARG)
28 June 2014; 16:00	1× (yellow card) 1× (suspension)	Report	2× (yellow card) 5× (suspension)	Estadio Sergio Matto, Canelones; Attendance: 150; Referees: Marina, Minore (ARG)

28 June 2014; 20:00	United States	41–28	Mexico	Estadio Sergio Matto, Canelones; Attendance: 150; Referees: Pinto, Menezes (BRA)
28 June 2014; 20:00	Elzoghby 9	(20–12)	Ab. Villalobos 9	Estadio Sergio Matto, Canelones; Attendance: 150; Referees: Pinto, Menezes (BRA)
28 June 2014; 20:00	2× (yellow card) 6× (suspension)	Report	2× (yellow card) 1× (suspension)	Estadio Sergio Matto, Canelones; Attendance: 150; Referees: Pinto, Menezes (BRA)

==== Semifinals ====
28 June 2014; 14:00	Argentina	30–16	Uruguay	Estadio Sergio Matto, Canelones; Attendance: 500; Referees: Posch, Jorgensen (USA)
28 June 2014; 14:00	S. Simonet, Cangiani 4	(18–6)	five players 2	Estadio Sergio Matto, Canelones; Attendance: 500; Referees: Posch, Jorgensen (USA)
28 June 2014; 14:00	1× (yellow card) 2× (suspension)	Report	2× (yellow card) 2× (suspension)	Estadio Sergio Matto, Canelones; Attendance: 500; Referees: Posch, Jorgensen (USA)

28 June 2014; 18:00	Brazil	36–28	Chile	Estadio Sergio Matto, Canelones; Attendance: 100; Referees: Gubica, Milošević (CRO)
28 June 2014; 18:00	Patrianova, Pozzer 5	(16–13)	R. Salinas 12	Estadio Sergio Matto, Canelones; Attendance: 100; Referees: Gubica, Milošević (CRO)
28 June 2014; 18:00	2× (yellow card) 4× (suspension)	Report	3× (yellow card) 2× (suspension)	Estadio Sergio Matto, Canelones; Attendance: 100; Referees: Gubica, Milošević (CRO)

==== Seventh-place game ====
29 June 2014; 14:00	Mexico	37–16	Guatemala	Estadio Sergio Matto, Canelones; Attendance: 100; Referees: Posch, Jorgensen (USA)
29 June 2014; 14:00	Aguirre, Ab. Villalobos 6	(15–9)	Stolz 4	Estadio Sergio Matto, Canelones; Attendance: 100; Referees: Posch, Jorgensen (USA)
29 June 2014; 14:00	1× (yellow card) 3× (suspension)	Report	4× (yellow card) 3× (suspension)	Estadio Sergio Matto, Canelones; Attendance: 100; Referees: Posch, Jorgensen (USA)

==== Fifth-place game ====
29 June 2014; 16:00	Greenland	43–32	United States	Estadio Sergio Matto, Canelones; Referees: Pérez, Guzmán (PUR)
29 June 2014; 16:00	An. Kreutzmann 11	(25–14)	Axelsson 12	Estadio Sergio Matto, Canelones; Referees: Pérez, Guzmán (PUR)
29 June 2014; 16:00	3× (yellow card) 4× (suspension)	Report	2× (yellow card) 1× (suspension)	Estadio Sergio Matto, Canelones; Referees: Pérez, Guzmán (PUR)

==== Third-place game ====
29 June 2014; 18:00	Uruguay	24–25	Chile	Estadio Sergio Matto, Canelones; Referees: Pinto, Menezes (BRA)
29 June 2014; 18:00	Velazco 8	(13–13)	R. Salinas 12	Estadio Sergio Matto, Canelones; Referees: Pinto, Menezes (BRA)
29 June 2014; 18:00	2× (yellow card) 4× (suspension)	Report	2× (yellow card) 2× (suspension)	Estadio Sergio Matto, Canelones; Referees: Pinto, Menezes (BRA)

==== Final ====
29 June 2014; 20:00	Argentina	30–19	Brazil	Estadio Sergio Matto, Canelones; Attendance: 1,250; Referees: Gubica, Milošević (CRO)
29 June 2014; 20:00	D. Simonet 11	(15–12)	Pacheco 6	Estadio Sergio Matto, Canelones; Attendance: 1,250; Referees: Gubica, Milošević (CRO)
29 June 2014; 20:00	3× (yellow card) 2× (suspension)	Report	3× (yellow card) 5× (suspension)	Estadio Sergio Matto, Canelones; Attendance: 1,250; Referees: Gubica, Milošević (CRO)

== Ranking and awards ==
=== Final ranking ===
Gold medal	Argentina
Silver medal	Brazil
Bronze medal	Chile
4	Uruguay
5	Greenland
6	United States
7	Mexico
8	Guatemala

Team advanced to the 2015 World Men's Handball Championship

=== All-Star Team ===
- Goalkeeper: (Brazil) Maik Santos
- Right wing: (Argentina) Federico Pizarro
- Right back: (Chile) Rodrigo Salinas
- Central back: (Argentina) Diego Simonet
- Left back: (Greenland) Akutaaneq Kreutzmann
- Left wing: (Uruguay) Alejandro Velazco
- Pivot: (Chile) Marco Oneto
