= Facundo Cangiani =

Argentine handball player

Personal information
- Nationality: Argentine
- Born: 23 April 1991 (age 35)
- Height: 1.82 m (6 ft 0 in)

Sport
- Sport: Handball
- Position: Right wing
- Current club: MMT Balonmano Zamora
- Number: 23
National team
Years	Team	Apps	(Gls)
–	Argentina	20	(115)
Medal record
Pan American Championship
Bronze medal – third place	2016 Argentina
South and Central American Championship
Gold medal – first place	2026 Paraguay

Facundo Cangiani (born 23 April 1991) is an Argentine handball player. He plays for MMT Balonmano Zamora and competed for the Argentine national team at the 2015 World Men's Handball Championship in Qatar and 2017 World Men's Handball Championship in France.
