= Santiago Baronetto =

Argentine handball player

Personal information
- Born: 27 October 1992 (age 33) Buenos Aires, Argentina
- Height: 1.87 m (6 ft 2 in)

Sport
- Sport: Handball
- Position: Right wing
- Current club: BM Ciudad Encantada
- Number: 9
National team
Years	Team	Apps	(Gls)
–	Argentina	38	(31)
Medal record
Pan American Games
Gold medal – first place	2019 Lima	Team
Gold medal – first place	2023 Santiago	Team
Pan American Championship
Gold medal – first place	2018 Greenland
South and Central American Championship
Silver medal – second place	2022 Brazil
Silver medal – second place	2024 Argentina
South American Games
Gold medal – first place	2022 Asunción	Team
Silver medal – second place	2018 Cochabamba	Team

Santiago Baronetto (born 27 October 1992) is an Argentine handball player for BM Ciudad Encantada and the Argentine national team.

He represented Argentina at the 2019 World Men's Handball Championship.
