= Rangel da Rosa =

Brazilian handball player (born 1996)

Personal information
- Full name: Rangel Luan da Rosa
- Born: 11 May 1996 (age 30) Seara, Brazil
- Height: 1.91 m (6 ft 3 in)

Sport
- Sport: Handball
- Position: Goalkeeper
- Current club: S.L. Benfica
- Number: 16

Senior clubs
- Years: Team
- –2015: São Caetano Handebol
- 2015–2016: BM Villa de Aranda
- 2016–2018: HC Odorheiu Secuiesc
- 2018–2020: Bidasoa Irún
- 2020–2021: BM Logroño La Rioja
- 2021–2023: BM Granollers
- 2023–2025: Saint-Raphaël VHB
- 2025–: S.L. Benfica
National team
- Years: Team
- –: Brazil
Medal record
Representing Brazil
Pan American Games
Silver medal – second place	2023 Santiago	Team
Pan American Championship
Gold medal – first place	2016 Argentina
South and Central American Championship
Gold medal – first place	2022 Brazil
Gold medal – first place	2024 Argentina
Silver medal – second place	2020 Brazil
Pan American Junior Championship
Gold medal – first place	2015 Brazil
Pan American Youth Championship
Gold medal – first place	2015 Venezuela

Rangel Luan da Rosa (born 11 May 1996) is a Brazilian handball player who plays for S.L. Benfica and the Brazilian national team.

In 2025 he was part of the Brazilian team that reached the quarterfinal of the World Championship for the first time, knocking out Sweden, Norway and Spain. They lost the quarterfinal to Denmark.
