= Guatemala men's national handball team =

Guatemala

Information
- Association: Federation National de Balomano de Guatemala
- Coach: Pluvio Santos Sierra

Colours
1st	2nd

Results

Pan American Championship
- Appearances: 3 (First in 2014)
- Best result: 8th (2014)
- Last updated on Unknown.

The Guatemala national handball team is the national team of Guatemala. It takes part in international handball competitions.

== Tournament record ==
=== Pan American Championship ===
Year	Round	Position	GP	W	D*	L	GS	GA
(Uruguay) 2014	seventh place match	8th	5	0	0	5	97	205
(Argentina) 2016	eleventh place match	11th	6	1	0	5	132	207
(Greenland) 2018	seventh place match	8th	6	1	0	5	111	219

=== Central American and Caribbean Games ===
Games	Round	Position	Pld	W	D	L	GF	GA	GD
(Colombia) 2018 Barranquilla	5th place game	6th	5	2	0	3	120	135	-15

=== Central American Games ===
Year	Round	Position	GP	W	D*	L	GS	GA
(Nicaragua) 2017	round robin	1st	4	4	0	0	106	84

=== Central American Championship ===
Year	Round	Position	GP	W	D*	L	GS	GA
(Costa Rica) 2015	round robin	1st	4	4	0	0	125	71
(Nicaragua) 2023	round robin	3rd	4	2	0	2	107	97

=== IHF South and Central American Emerging Nations Championship ===
Year	Round	Position	GP	W	D*	L	GS	GA
(Colombia) 2018	bronze medal game	4th	6	2	0	4	154	145

=== IHF Emerging Nations Championship ===
Year	Round	Position	GP	W	D*	L	GS	GA
(Bulgaria) 2023	ninth place game	10th	4	1	0	3	76	96
