= 1996 Pan American Men's Handball Championship =

Tournament details
- Host country: United States
- Venue(s): 1 (in 1 host city)
- Dates: 8–13 October
- Teams: 8 (from 1 confederation)

Final positions
- Champions: Cuba (7th title)
- Runner-up: Argentina
- Third place: United States
- Fourth place: Brazil

Tournament statistics
- Matches played: 20
- Goals scored: 918 (45.9 per match)

The 1996 Pan American Men's Handball Championship was the seventh edition of the tournament, held in Colorado Springs, United States from 8 to 13 October 1996. It acted as the American qualifying tournament for the 1997 World Championship, where the top three placed team qualied.

== Preliminary round ==
All times are local (UTC−7).

=== Group A ===
Pos	Team	Pld	W	D	L	GF	GA	GD	Pts	Qualification
1	United States (H)	3	3	0	0	74	51	+23	6	Semifinals
2	Brazil	3	2	0	1	92	51	+41	4	Semifinals
3	Mexico	3	1	0	2	70	72	−2	2	
4	Costa Rica	3	0	0	3	46	108	−62	0	

Source: Todor66
Rules for classification: 1) points; 2) head-to-head points; 3) head-to-head goal difference; 4) head-to-head number of goals scored; 5) goal difference.
(H) Hosts

8 October 1996; 16:30	Brazil	44–16	Costa Rica
8 October 1996; 16:30		(20–7)

8 October 1996; 18:15	United States	25–20	Mexico
8 October 1996; 18:15		(13–9)

9 October 1996; 16:30	Brazil	34–14	Mexico
9 October 1996; 16:30		(17–6)

9 October 1996; 18:15	United States	28–17	Costa Rica
9 October 1996; 18:15		(14–6)

10 October 1996; 16:30	Mexico	36–13	Costa Rica
10 October 1996; 16:30		(17–7)

10 October 1996; 18:15	United States	21–14	Brazil
10 October 1996; 18:15		(9–8)

=== Group B ===
Pos	Team	Pld	W	D	L	GF	GA	GD	Pts	Qualification
1	Cuba	3	3	0	0	95	49	+46	6	Semifinals
2	Argentina	3	2	0	1	75	57	+18	4	Semifinals
3	Canada	3	1	0	2	69	66	+3	2	
4	Puerto Rico	3	0	0	3	43	110	−67	0	

Source: Todor66
Rules for classification: 1) points; 2) head-to-head points; 3) head-to-head goal difference; 4) head-to-head number of goals scored; 5) goal difference.

8 October 1996; 13:00	Cuba	44–16	Puerto Rico
8 October 1996; 13:00		(20–7)

8 October 1996; 14:45	Argentina	25–20	Canada
8 October 1996; 14:45		(13–9)

9 October 1996; 13:00	Argentina	34–14	Puerto Rico
9 October 1996; 13:00		(17–6)

9 October 1996; 14:45	Cuba	28–17	Canada
9 October 1996; 14:45		(14–6)

10 October 1996; 13:00	Canada	32–13	Puerto Rico
10 October 1996; 13:00		(14–7)

10 October 1996; 14:45	Cuba	23–16	Argentina
10 October 1996; 14:45		(9–7)

== Knockout stage ==
=== Bracket ===
Semi-finals
United States	15
Argentina	20
Cuba	21
Brazil	18

Final
Argentina	24
Cuba (ET)	28
Third place
United States	23
Brazil	22

Fifth place bracket

Semi-finals
Mexico	28
Puerto Rico	26
Canada	30
Costa Rica	13

Final
Mexico	19
Canada	26
Third place
Puerto Rico	21
Costa Rica	20

=== 5–8th place semifinals ===
12 October 1996; 13:00	Mexico	28–26	Puerto Rico
12 October 1996; 13:00		(14–9)

12 October 1996; 14:45	Canada	30–13	Costa Rica
12 October 1996; 14:45		(14–5)

=== Semifinals ===
12 October 1996; 16:30	Argentina	20–15	United States
12 October 1996; 16:30		(10–6)

12 October 1996; 18:15	Cuba	21–18	Brazil
12 October 1996; 18:15		(14–10)

=== Seventh place game ===
13 October 1996; 11:50	Puerto Rico	21–20	Costa Rica
13 October 1996; 11:50		(11–5)

=== Fifth place game ===
13 October 1996; 14:45	Canada	26–19	Mexico
13 October 1996; 14:45		(12–4)

=== Third place game ===
13 October 1996; 16:30	United States	23–22	Brazil
13 October 1996; 16:30		(11–12)

=== Final ===
13 October 1996
18:15
Cuba
28–24 (ET)
Argentina

(9–9)

FT: 21–21 ET: 7–3

== Final ranking ==
Qualified for the 1997 World Championship

Rank	Team
Gold medal	Cuba
Silver medal	Argentina
Bronze medal	United States
4	Brazil
5	Canada
6	Mexico
7	Puerto Rico
8	Costa Rica

The United States withdrew and Brazil replaced them.
