= 2026 South and Central American Men's Handball Championship =

International handball competition

Tournament details
- Host country: Paraguay
- Venue: 1 (in 1 host city)
- Dates: 19–24 January
- Teams: 6 (from 1 confederation)

Final positions
- Champions: Argentina (2nd title)
- Runners-up: Brazil
- Third place: Chile
- Fourth place: Uruguay

Tournament statistics
- Matches played: 15
- Goals scored: 902 (60.13 per match)
- Attendance: 5,710 (381 per match)
- Top scorers: (Brazil) Rudolph Hackbarth (37 goals)

The 2026 South and Central American Men's Handball Championship was the fourth edition of the South and Central American Men's Handball Championship, held from 19 to 24 January 2026 in Asunción, Paraguay. It acted as the South and Central American qualifying tournament for the 2027 World Men's Handball Championship.

Argentina won their title second title, defeating Brazil 26–25 in the final.

== Teams ==
Team	Appearance(s)					Previous best performance (Note: Bold text indicates they hosted that edition.)
Team	Total	First	Last	Streak	2024	Previous best performance
Argentina	4th	2020	2024	4	2nd	Champions (2020)
Brazil	4th	2020	2024	4	1st	Champions (2022, 2024)
Chile	4th	2020	2024	4	3rd	Third place (2022, 2024)
Paraguay (H)	4th	2020	2024	4	4th	Fourth place (2024)
Peru	1st	Debut				
Uruguay	4th	2020	2024	4	5th	Third place (2020)

== Venue ==
The venue is the SND Arena in Asunción. The venue has hosted the 2021 Artistic Skating World Championships, Artistic Skating events at the 2022 South American Games and the 2022 Copa América de Futsal.

2026 South and Central American Men's Handball Championship is located in Paraguay	Asunción
2026 South and Central American Men's Handball Championship is located in Paraguay	SND Arena
2026 South and Central American Men's Handball Championship is located in Paraguay	Capacity: 5,500

== Standings ==
Pos	Team	Pld	W	D	L	GF	GA	GD	Pts	Qualification
1st place, gold medalist(s)	Argentina	5	5	0	0	192	98	+94	10	2027 World Championship
2nd place, silver medalist(s)	Brazil	5	4	0	1	198	104	+94	8	2027 World Championship
3rd place, bronze medalist(s)	Chile	5	3	0	2	160	134	+26	6	2027 World Championship
4	Uruguay	5	2	0	3	131	149	−18	4	2027 World Championship
5	Paraguay (H)	5	1	0	4	131	181	−50	2	
6	Peru	5	0	0	5	90	236	−146	0	

Source: IHF
Rules for classification: 1) points; 2) head-to-head points; 3) head-to-head goal difference; 4) head-to-head number of goals scored; 5) goal difference.
(H) Hosts

== Results ==
All times are local (UTC−3).

19 January 2026; 14:00	Chile	40–22	Uruguay	SND Arena, Asunción; Attendance: 100; Referees: Altmár, Horváth (HUN)
19 January 2026; 14:00	Feuchtmann 6	(22–15)	De Agrela 6	SND Arena, Asunción; Attendance: 100; Referees: Altmár, Horváth (HUN)
19 January 2026; 14:00	1× (yellow card) 2× (suspension)	Report	4× (suspension)	SND Arena, Asunción; Attendance: 100; Referees: Altmár, Horváth (HUN)

19 January 2026; 16:15	Argentina	49–17	Peru	SND Arena, Asunción; Attendance: 115; Referees: Corrêa, Corrêa (BRA)
19 January 2026; 16:15	R. Martínez 12	(24–10)	Ortiz 5	SND Arena, Asunción; Attendance: 115; Referees: Corrêa, Corrêa (BRA)
19 January 2026; 16:15	2× (suspension)	Report		SND Arena, Asunción; Attendance: 115; Referees: Corrêa, Corrêa (BRA)

19 January 2026; 20:00	Brazil	40–18	Paraguay	SND Arena, Asunción; Attendance: 450; Referees: Lemes, Sosa (URU)
19 January 2026; 20:00	Da Silva 7	(19–12)	Rojas 4	SND Arena, Asunción; Attendance: 450; Referees: Lemes, Sosa (URU)
19 January 2026; 20:00	1× (yellow card) 3× (suspension)	Report	2× (suspension)	SND Arena, Asunción; Attendance: 450; Referees: Lemes, Sosa (URU)

20 January 2026; 15:30	Uruguay	25–33	Brazil	SND Arena, Asunción; Attendance: 100; Referees: Lenci, Grillo (ARG)
20 January 2026; 15:30	Chaparro 8	(13–13)	Langaro 10	SND Arena, Asunción; Attendance: 100; Referees: Lenci, Grillo (ARG)
20 January 2026; 15:30		Report	4× (suspension) 1× (red card)	SND Arena, Asunción; Attendance: 100; Referees: Lenci, Grillo (ARG)

20 January 2026; 18:00	Peru	12–40	Chile	SND Arena, Asunción; Attendance: 150; Referees: Conberse, Correa (ARG)
20 January 2026; 18:00	Trelles 5	(3–23)	Aedo, Scaramelli 6	SND Arena, Asunción; Attendance: 150; Referees: Conberse, Correa (ARG)
20 January 2026; 18:00	3× (suspension)	Report	1× (suspension)	SND Arena, Asunción; Attendance: 150; Referees: Conberse, Correa (ARG)

20 January 2026; 20:30	Paraguay	15–45	Argentina	SND Arena, Asunción; Attendance: 400; Referees: Corrêa, Corrêa (BRA)
20 January 2026; 20:30	Martínez 5	(6–21)	P. Martínez 10	SND Arena, Asunción; Attendance: 400; Referees: Corrêa, Corrêa (BRA)
20 January 2026; 20:30	2× (suspension)	Report	2× (suspension)	SND Arena, Asunción; Attendance: 400; Referees: Corrêa, Corrêa (BRA)

21 January 2026; 15:30	Brazil	34–21	Chile	SND Arena, Asunción; Attendance: 210; Referees: Conberse, Correa (ARG)
21 January 2026; 15:30	Hackbarth, Monte 5	(16–10)	Feuchtmann 6	SND Arena, Asunción; Attendance: 210; Referees: Conberse, Correa (ARG)
21 January 2026; 15:30	2× (yellow card) 4× (suspension)	Report	3× (suspension)	SND Arena, Asunción; Attendance: 210; Referees: Conberse, Correa (ARG)

21 January 2026; 18:00	Paraguay	45–30	Peru	SND Arena, Asunción; Attendance: 265; Referees: Lenci, Grillo (ARG)
21 January 2026; 18:00	Rojas, Viana 7	(21–15)	Araya 12	SND Arena, Asunción; Attendance: 265; Referees: Lenci, Grillo (ARG)
21 January 2026; 18:00	1× (yellow card) 3× (suspension)	Report	1× (suspension)	SND Arena, Asunción; Attendance: 265; Referees: Lenci, Grillo (ARG)

21 January 2026; 20:30	Argentina	35–18	Uruguay	SND Arena, Asunción; Attendance: 300; Referees: Altmár, Horváth (HUN)
21 January 2026; 20:30	Bono, R. Martínez 6	(16–10)	De Agrela, Rostagno 4	SND Arena, Asunción; Attendance: 300; Referees: Altmár, Horváth (HUN)
21 January 2026; 20:30	6× (suspension)	Report	1× (yellow card) 3× (suspension) 1× (red card) 1×	SND Arena, Asunción; Attendance: 300; Referees: Altmár, Horváth (HUN)

23 January 2026; 15:30	Brazil	66–14	Peru	SND Arena, Asunción; Attendance: 120; Referees: Conberse, Correa (ARG)
23 January 2026; 15:30	Hackbarth 15	(30–8)	Ortiz 5	SND Arena, Asunción; Attendance: 120; Referees: Conberse, Correa (ARG)
23 January 2026; 15:30	1× (yellow card)	Report	5× (suspension)	SND Arena, Asunción; Attendance: 120; Referees: Conberse, Correa (ARG)

23 January 2026; 18:00	Argentina	37–23	Chile	SND Arena, Asunción; Attendance: 320; Referees: Lemes, Sosa (URU)
23 January 2026; 18:00	Jung 8	(17–7)	Feuchtmann 5	SND Arena, Asunción; Attendance: 320; Referees: Lemes, Sosa (URU)
23 January 2026; 18:00	1× (yellow card) 5× (suspension) 2× (red card) 1×	Report	4× (suspension)	SND Arena, Asunción; Attendance: 320; Referees: Lemes, Sosa (URU)

23 January 2026; 20:30	Paraguay	24–30	Uruguay	SND Arena, Asunción; Attendance: 2,000; Referees: Lenci, Grillo (ARG)
23 January 2026; 20:30	Fiore 10	(9–13)	Rostagno 10	SND Arena, Asunción; Attendance: 2,000; Referees: Lenci, Grillo (ARG)
23 January 2026; 20:30	2× (yellow card) 6× (suspension) 1× (red card)	Report	4× (suspension)	SND Arena, Asunción; Attendance: 2,000; Referees: Lenci, Grillo (ARG)

24 January 2026; 15:30	Uruguay	36–17	Peru	SND Arena, Asunción; Attendance: 80; Referees: Lenci, Grillo (ARG)
24 January 2026; 15:30	Tapia 8	(17–6)	Ortiz 6	SND Arena, Asunción; Attendance: 80; Referees: Lenci, Grillo (ARG)
24 January 2026; 15:30	1× (suspension)	Report	3× (suspension)	SND Arena, Asunción; Attendance: 80; Referees: Lenci, Grillo (ARG)

24 January 2026; 18:00	Chile	36–29	Paraguay	SND Arena, Asunción; Attendance: 350; Referees: Corrêa, Corrêa (BRA)
24 January 2026; 18:00	Salgado 10	(18–12)	Fiore, Salinas 7	SND Arena, Asunción; Attendance: 350; Referees: Corrêa, Corrêa (BRA)
24 January 2026; 18:00	4× (suspension) 1× (red card)	Report	5× (suspension) 2× (red card)	SND Arena, Asunción; Attendance: 350; Referees: Corrêa, Corrêa (BRA)

24 January 2026; 20:30	Brazil	25–26	Argentina	SND Arena, Asunción; Attendance: 750; Referees: Altmár, Horváth (HUN)
24 January 2026; 20:30	Hackbarth 7	(12–14)	Bono 6	SND Arena, Asunción; Attendance: 750; Referees: Altmár, Horváth (HUN)
24 January 2026; 20:30	1× (yellow card) 4× (suspension)	Report	2× (yellow card) 7× (suspension)	SND Arena, Asunción; Attendance: 750; Referees: Altmár, Horváth (HUN)

== Statistics ==
=== Top goalscorers ===
Rank	Name	Goals	Shots	%
1	(Brazil) Rudolph Hackbarth	37	47	79
2	(Argentina) Ramiro Martínez	28	39	72
2	(Chile) Erwin Feuchtmann	28	49	57
4	(Uruguay) Maximiliano De Agrela	26	41	63
5	(Brazil) Marcos da Silva	25	31	81
6	(Uruguay) Cristhian Rostagno	23	29	79
6	(Paraguay) José Fiore	23	39	59
6	(Peru) Jesús Ortiz	23	52	44
9	(Argentina) Nicolás Bono	20	23	87
9	(Brazil) Haniel Langaro	20	35	57
9	(Paraguay) Jorge Rojas	20	28	71

=== Top goalkeepers ===
Rank	Name	%	Saves	Shots
1	(Brazil) Mateus Martins	45	39	87
2	(Uruguay) Felipe González	36	30	84
3	(Brazil) Rangel da Rosa	35	30	86
4	(Argentina) Agustín Forlino	31	13	42
5	(Argentina) Juan Bar	29	28	95
6	(Uruguay) Juan Anandez	28	18	65
7	(Chile) Vicente González	26	18	69
8	(Paraguay) Matías Chávez	24	25	104
9	(Paraguay) Martín González	23	26	111
10	(Chile) Felipe García	22	22	101
