= 2015 Central American Men's Handball Championship =

Tournament details
- Host country: Costa Rica
- Venue: 1 (in 1 host city)
- Dates: 16–20 November
- Teams: 5 (from 1 confederation)

Final positions
- Champions: Guatemala (1st title)
- Runners-up: Costa Rica
- Third place: Honduras
- Fourth place: El Salvador

Tournament statistics
- Matches played: 10
- Goals scored: 498 (49.8 per match)
- Top scorer(s): Víctor Morales Chacón (GUA) (26 goals)

The 2015 Central American Men's Handball Championship took place in Cartago, Costa Rica from 16 to 20 November. It acts as a qualifying tournament for the 2016 Pan American Men's Handball Championship.

== Results ==
Team	Pld	W	D	L	GF	GA	GD	Pts
Guatemala	4	4	0	0	125	71	+54	8
Costa Rica	4	3	0	1	121	78	+43	6
Honduras	4	1	1	2	84	98	–14	3
El Salvador	4	1	0	3	75	121	–46	2
Nicaragua	4	0	1	3	93	130	–37	1

== Round robin ==
November 16; 17:00	Nicaragua	22 – 43	Guatemala	Polideportivo de Cartago, Cartago; Referees: Gamboa, Segura (CRC)
November 16; 17:00	Silva 8	(13–26)	Herrera, M. Morales 9	Polideportivo de Cartago, Cartago; Referees: Gamboa, Segura (CRC)
November 16; 17:00	1× (suspension)	Report	2× (suspension)	Polideportivo de Cartago, Cartago; Referees: Gamboa, Segura (CRC)

November 16; 19:30	Costa Rica	34 – 16	Honduras	Polideportivo de Cartago, Cartago; Referees: Zuñiga, Reyes (CUB)
November 16; 19:30	Montero 5	(18–4)	Garcia 6	Polideportivo de Cartago, Cartago; Referees: Zuñiga, Reyes (CUB)
November 16; 19:30	3× (yellow card) 8× (suspension)	Report	2× (yellow card) 5× (suspension) 1× (red card)	Polideportivo de Cartago, Cartago; Referees: Zuñiga, Reyes (CUB)

November 17; 17:00	Honduras	19 – 26	Guatemala	Polideportivo de Cartago, Cartago; Referees: Montiel, Hernandez (NIC)
November 17; 17:00	Garcia 6	(8–13)	M. Morales 8	Polideportivo de Cartago, Cartago; Referees: Montiel, Hernandez (NIC)
November 17; 17:00	3× (yellow card) 4× (suspension)	Report	3× (yellow card) 4× (suspension)	Polideportivo de Cartago, Cartago; Referees: Montiel, Hernandez (NIC)

November 17; 19:30	El Salvador	18 – 39	Costa Rica	Polideportivo de Cartago, Cartago; Referees: Urrutia, Perez (GUA)
November 17; 19:30	Garcia 5	(8–20)	Perez, Saborio 6	Polideportivo de Cartago, Cartago; Referees: Urrutia, Perez (GUA)
November 17; 19:30	1× (yellow card) 4× (suspension)	Report	3× (yellow card) 1× (suspension)	Polideportivo de Cartago, Cartago; Referees: Urrutia, Perez (GUA)

November 18; 17:00	El Salvador	13 – 24	Honduras	Polideportivo de Cartago, Cartago; Referees: Zuñiga, Reyes (CUB)
November 18; 17:00	Ramires, Ramos 3	(4–10)	Garcia 5	Polideportivo de Cartago, Cartago; Referees: Zuñiga, Reyes (CUB)
November 18; 17:00	3× (yellow card) 4× (suspension)	Report	3× (yellow card) 5× (suspension)	Polideportivo de Cartago, Cartago; Referees: Zuñiga, Reyes (CUB)

November 18; 19:30	Costa Rica	34 – 20	Nicaragua	Polideportivo de Cartago, Cartago; Referees: Urrutia, Perez (GUA)
November 18; 19:30	three players 5	(18–8)	Urbina 5	Polideportivo de Cartago, Cartago; Referees: Urrutia, Perez (GUA)
November 18; 19:30	3× (yellow card) 6× (suspension)	Report	2× (yellow card) 5× (suspension)	Polideportivo de Cartago, Cartago; Referees: Urrutia, Perez (GUA)

November 19; 17:00	Guatemala	32 – 16	El Salvador	Polideportivo de Cartago, Cartago; Referees: Montiel, Hernandes (NIC)
November 19; 17:00	Herrera, V. Morales 8	(15–9)	Ramos, Palacios 4	Polideportivo de Cartago, Cartago; Referees: Montiel, Hernandes (NIC)
November 19; 17:00	2× (yellow card) 1× (suspension)	Report	3× (yellow card) 2× (suspension)	Polideportivo de Cartago, Cartago; Referees: Montiel, Hernandes (NIC)

November 19; 19:30	Nicaragua	25 – 25	Honduras	Polideportivo de Cartago, Cartago; Referees: Gamboa, Segura (CRC)
November 19; 19:30	Mendoza 8	(14–11)	Garcia, Montoya 6	Polideportivo de Cartago, Cartago; Referees: Gamboa, Segura (CRC)
November 19; 19:30	3× (yellow card) 5× (suspension)	Report	3× (yellow card) 2× (suspension)	Polideportivo de Cartago, Cartago; Referees: Gamboa, Segura (CRC)

November 20; 17:00	Nicaragua	26 – 28	El Salvador	Polideportivo de Cartago, Cartago; Referees: Gamboa, Segura (CRC)
November 20; 17:00	Silva 8	(15–10)	Ramos 8	Polideportivo de Cartago, Cartago; Referees: Gamboa, Segura (CRC)
November 20; 17:00	2× (yellow card) 4× (suspension)	Report	1× (yellow card) 4× (suspension)	Polideportivo de Cartago, Cartago; Referees: Gamboa, Segura (CRC)

November 20; 19:30	Guatemala	24 – 14	Costa Rica	Polideportivo de Cartago, Cartago; Referees: Zuñiga, Reyes (CUB)
November 20; 19:30	three players 6	(8–5)	Orozco 7	Polideportivo de Cartago, Cartago; Referees: Zuñiga, Reyes (CUB)
November 20; 19:30	2× (yellow card) 4× (suspension)	Report	2× (yellow card) 2× (suspension)	Polideportivo de Cartago, Cartago; Referees: Zuñiga, Reyes (CUB)

== Final standing ==
Rank	Team
Gold medal	Guatemala
Silver medal	Costa Rica
Bronze medal	Honduras
4	El Salvador
5	Nicaragua

Team qualified to the 2016 Pan American Men's Handball Championship
