= 2023 Central American Men's Handball Championship =

Tournament details
- Host country: Nicaragua
- City: 1
- Venue: 1 (in 1 host city)
- Dates: 21–25 February
- Teams: 5 (from 1 confederation)

Final positions
- Champions: Costa Rica (2nd title)
- Runners-up: Nicaragua
- Third place: Guatemala
- Fourth place: Honduras

Tournament statistics
- Matches played: 10
- Goals scored: 564 (56.4 per match)
- Top scorer: (Nicaragua) Kenneth Garay (36 goals)

The 2023 Central American Men's Handball Championship took place in Managua, Nicaragua from 21 to 25 February. It acted as a qualifying tournament for the 2023 Central American and Caribbean Games and the 2024 South and Central American Men's Handball Championship. The tournament was broadcast by Fanatiz.

== Results ==
Pos	Team	Pld	W	D	L	GF	GA	GD	Pts	Qualification
1	Costa Rica	4	4	0	0	129	94	+35	8	2023 Central American and Caribbean Games and 2024 South and Central American Championship
2	Nicaragua (H)	4	3	0	1	134	120	+14	6	2023 Central American and Caribbean Games
3	Guatemala	4	2	0	2	107	97	+10	4	
4	Honduras	4	1	0	3	104	129	−25	2	
5	El Salvador	4	0	0	4	90	124	−34	0	Qualified as host for the 2023 Central American and Caribbean Games

Source: SCAHC
Rules for classification: 1) Points; 2) Head-to-head points; 3) Head-to-head goal difference; 4) Head-to-head goals scored; 5) Goal difference; 6) Goals scored; 7) Draw.
(H) Hosts

== Round robin ==
All times are local (UTC−06:00).

21 February 2023; 18:00	Honduras	20–30	Guatemala	Instituto Nicaragüense de Deportes, Managua; Attendance: 150; Referees: Castillo, Alvarado (CRC)
21 February 2023; 18:00	Garcia 7	(7–12)	Estrada 10	Instituto Nicaragüense de Deportes, Managua; Attendance: 150; Referees: Castillo, Alvarado (CRC)
21 February 2023; 18:00	6× (suspension) 1× (red card)	Report	4× (suspension) 1× (red card)	Instituto Nicaragüense de Deportes, Managua; Attendance: 150; Referees: Castillo, Alvarado (CRC)

21 February 2023; 20:00	El Salvador	29–33	Nicaragua	Instituto Nicaragüense de Deportes, Managua; Attendance: 250; Referees: Barahona, Gomez
21 February 2023; 20:00	Sosa 8	(13–13)	Garay 9	Instituto Nicaragüense de Deportes, Managua; Attendance: 250; Referees: Barahona, Gomez
21 February 2023; 20:00	1× (yellow card) 5× (suspension)	Report	1× (yellow card) 4× (suspension) 1× (red card)	Instituto Nicaragüense de Deportes, Managua; Attendance: 250; Referees: Barahona, Gomez

22 February 2023; 18:00	Honduras	26–20	El Salvador	Instituto Nicaragüense de Deportes, Managua; Attendance: 100; Referees: Correa, Correa (BRA)
22 February 2023; 18:00	Garcia 7	(12–8)	Hernandez 6	Instituto Nicaragüense de Deportes, Managua; Attendance: 100; Referees: Correa, Correa (BRA)
22 February 2023; 18:00	1× (yellow card) 6× (suspension) 1× (red card)	Report	0× (yellow card) 6× (suspension)	Instituto Nicaragüense de Deportes, Managua; Attendance: 100; Referees: Correa, Correa (BRA)

22 February 2023; 20:00	Nicaragua	25–30	Costa Rica	Instituto Nicaragüense de Deportes, Managua; Attendance: 250; Referees: Gomez, Parra
22 February 2023; 20:00	Garay 6	(11–14)	Barrantes, Molina 6	Instituto Nicaragüense de Deportes, Managua; Attendance: 250; Referees: Gomez, Parra
22 February 2023; 20:00	7× (suspension) 1× (red card)	Report	1× (yellow card) 5× (suspension)	Instituto Nicaragüense de Deportes, Managua; Attendance: 250; Referees: Gomez, Parra

23 February 2023; 18:00	Costa Rica	25–22	Guatemala	Instituto Nicaragüense de Deportes, Managua; Attendance: 100; Referees: Parra, Arana
23 February 2023; 18:00	Herrera 7	(15–9)	Martinez 6	Instituto Nicaragüense de Deportes, Managua; Attendance: 100; Referees: Parra, Arana
23 February 2023; 18:00	1× (yellow card) 6× (suspension)	Report	1× (yellow card) 6× (suspension)	Instituto Nicaragüense de Deportes, Managua; Attendance: 100; Referees: Parra, Arana

23 February 2023; 20:00	Nicaragua	44–32	Honduras	Instituto Nicaragüense de Deportes, Managua; Attendance: 280; Referees: Castillo, Alvarado (CRC)
23 February 2023; 20:00	Garay 10	(26–18)	Raudales 7	Instituto Nicaragüense de Deportes, Managua; Attendance: 280; Referees: Castillo, Alvarado (CRC)
23 February 2023; 20:00	6× (suspension)	Report	1× (yellow card) 4× (suspension)	Instituto Nicaragüense de Deportes, Managua; Attendance: 280; Referees: Castillo, Alvarado (CRC)

24 February 2023; 18:00	El Salvador	21–39	Costa Rica	Instituto Nicaragüense de Deportes, Managua; Attendance: 80; Referees: Pagoaga, Zambrano (HON)
24 February 2023; 18:00	Alvarenga, Espinoza 4	(10–19)	Jimenez 7	Instituto Nicaragüense de Deportes, Managua; Attendance: 80; Referees: Pagoaga, Zambrano (HON)
24 February 2023; 18:00	1× (yellow card) 2× (suspension)	Report	1× (yellow card)	Instituto Nicaragüense de Deportes, Managua; Attendance: 80; Referees: Pagoaga, Zambrano (HON)

24 February 2023; 20:00	Guatemala	29–32	Nicaragua	Instituto Nicaragüense de Deportes, Managua; Attendance: 450; Referees: Castillo, Alvarado (CRC)
24 February 2023; 20:00	Herrera 10	(14–14)	Garay 11	Instituto Nicaragüense de Deportes, Managua; Attendance: 450; Referees: Castillo, Alvarado (CRC)
24 February 2023; 20:00	1× (yellow card) 5× (suspension)	Report	10× (yellow card) 4× (suspension)	Instituto Nicaragüense de Deportes, Managua; Attendance: 450; Referees: Castillo, Alvarado (CRC)

25 February 2023; 18:00	El Salvador	20–26	Guatemala	Instituto Nicaragüense de Deportes, Managua; Attendance: 50; Referees: Pagoaga, Zambrano (HON)
25 February 2023; 18:00	Espinoza 8	(12–15)	Estrada, Soto 5	Instituto Nicaragüense de Deportes, Managua; Attendance: 50; Referees: Pagoaga, Zambrano (HON)
25 February 2023; 18:00	0× (yellow card) 3× (suspension)	Report	3× (yellow card) 4× (suspension)	Instituto Nicaragüense de Deportes, Managua; Attendance: 50; Referees: Pagoaga, Zambrano (HON)

25 February 2023; 20:00	Costa Rica	35–26	Honduras	Instituto Nicaragüense de Deportes, Managua; Attendance: 50; Referees: Parra, Rojas
25 February 2023; 20:00	Jimenez 7	(18–10)	Garcia 7	Instituto Nicaragüense de Deportes, Managua; Attendance: 50; Referees: Parra, Rojas
25 February 2023; 20:00	1× (yellow card) 3× (suspension)	Report	1× (yellow card) 3× (suspension)	Instituto Nicaragüense de Deportes, Managua; Attendance: 50; Referees: Parra, Rojas
