= Costa Rica men's national handball team =

National handball team representing Costa Rica

Costa Rica

Information
- Association: Federacion Costaricense de Balonmano
- Coach: Solón Jarquín Jarquín

Colours
| 1st | 2nd |

Results

Pan American Championship
- Appearances: 1 (First in 1996)
- Best result: 8th (1996)
- Last updated on Unknown.

The Costa Rica national handball team is the national handball team of Costa Rica and is controlled by the Federacion Costaricense de Balonmano and takes part in international handball competitions. It is affiliated to the IHF and the PATHF.

== Tournament record ==
=== Pan American Championship ===
| Year | Round | Position | GP | W | D* | L | GS | GA |
|---|---|---|---|---|---|---|---|---|
| (United States) 1996 | 7th place game | 7th | 5 | 1 | 0 | 4 | 90 | 158 |

=== South and Central American Championship ===
| Year | Round | Position | GP | W | D* | L | GF | GA |
|---|---|---|---|---|---|---|---|---|
| (Brazil) 2022 | Fifth place game | 6th | 5 | 1 | 0 | 4 | 113 | 156 |
| (Argentina) 2024 | round robin | 6th | 5 | 0 | 0 | 5 | 87 | 195 |
| Total | | 2/3 | 10 | 1 | 0 | 9 | 200 | 351 |

=== Central American and Caribbean Games ===
| Games | Round | Position | Pld | W | D | L | GF | GA | GD |
|---|---|---|---|---|---|---|---|---|---|
| (Colombia) 2018 Barranquilla | 7th place game | 7th | 5 | 1 | 0 | 4 | 104 | 135 | -31 |
| (El Salvador) 2023 San Salvador | 5th place game | 6th | 5 | 1 | 1 | 3 | 137 | 161 | −24 |

=== Central American Games ===
| Year | Round | Position | GP | W | D* | L | GS | GA |
|---|---|---|---|---|---|---|---|---|
| (Nicaragua) 2017 | round robin | 2nd | 4 | 3 | 0 | 1 | 107 | 82 |

=== Central American Championship ===
| Year | Round | Position | GP | W | D* | L | GS | GA |
|---|---|---|---|---|---|---|---|---|
| (Costa Rica) 2015 | round robin | 2nd | 4 | 3 | 0 | 1 | 121 | 78 |
| (Honduras) 2021 | round robin | 1st | 2 | 2 | 0 | 0 | 79 | 50 |
| (Nicaragua) 2023 | round robin | 1st | 4 | 4 | 0 | 0 | 129 | 94 |

=== IHF South and Central American Emerging Nations Championship ===
| Year | Round | Position | GP | W | D* | L | GS | GA |
|---|---|---|---|---|---|---|---|---|
| (Colombia) 2018 | fifth place game | 5th | 5 | 4 | 0 | 1 | 179 | 124 |

== Current squad ==
This is the squad for the 2014 Central American and Caribbean Games.

Head coach: Solón Jarquín Jarquín Goalkeeping coach: Jorge Ocampo Arce

| No. | Pos. | Name | Date of birth (age) | Height | App. | Goals | Club |
|---|---|---|---|---|---|---|---|
| 12 | GK | Franz Taylor Bonilla | 12 April 1981 (aged 32) | 1.83 m | | | (Costa Rica) Ciemhcavi |
| 1 | GK | Carlos Luis Sanchez Castro | 10 November 1986 (aged 27) | 1.73 m | | | (Costa Rica) Ciemhcavi |
| 11 | CB | Rafael de la Peña Hamblin | 14 May 1982 (aged 31) | 1.78 m | | | (Costa Rica) Ciemhcavi |
| 10 | LB | Emanuel Araya Carvajal | 31 December 1989 (aged 24) | 1.78 m | | | (Costa Rica) Ciemhcavi |
| 5 | LW | Pablo Saborío Villalobos | 29 November 1987 (aged 26) | 1.72 m | | | (Costa Rica) Ciemhcavi |
| 15 | LB | Manuel Montero Barrantes | 16 February 1984 (aged 29) | 1.85 m | | | (Costa Rica) Ciemhcavi |
| 4 | RW | Sebastián Montero Jiménez | 10 December 1996 (aged 17) | 1.70 m | | | (Costa Rica) CCDR San José |
| 9 | CB | Christian Montero Coto | 18 December 1979 (aged 34) | 1.76 m | | | (Costa Rica) Revolution San Pablo |
| 3 | P CB | Roy Arley Mora | 27 September 1977 (aged 36) | 1.80 m | | | (Costa Rica) Revolution San Pablo |
| 7 | LW | Kevin Naranjo Vargas | 26 June 1994 (aged 19) | 1.70 m | | | (Costa Rica) Revolution San Pablo |
| 19 | LB | Marcel Kaune Schmidt | 15 April 1996 (aged 17) | 1.88 m | | | Universidad de Costa Rica |
| 2 | P | Renato Pérez Martínez | 30 October 1992 (aged 21) | 1.82 m | | | Universidad de Costa Rica |
| 16 | GK | Jepherson Ruíz Duarte | 28 August 1992 (aged 21) | 1.86 m | | | Universidad Nacional de Costa Rica |
| 13 | RW | Kenneth Guzman Quesada | 30 March 1979 (aged 34) | 1.73 m | | | (Costa Rica) Revolution San Pablo |
| 23 | LB LR | Daniel Kaune Schmidt | 19 July 1994 (aged 20) | 1.92 m | | | (Germany) |
