= 2021 Central American Men's Handball Championship =

Tournament details
- Host country: Honduras
- City: 1
- Venue(s): 1 (in 1 host city)
- Dates: 11–13 November
- Teams: 3 (from 1 confederation)

Final positions
- Champions: Costa Rica (1st title)
- Runner-up: El Salvador
- Third place: Honduras

Tournament statistics
- Matches played: 3
- Goals scored: 173 (57.67 per match)
- Attendance: 350 (117 per match)
- Top scorer(s): (El Salvador) Ricardo Espinoza Ramos (14 goals)

The 2021 Central American Men's Handball Championship took place in Tegucigalpa, Honduras from 11 to 13 November. It acted as a qualifying tournament for the 2022 South and Central American Men's Handball Championship.

== Results ==
Pos	Team	Pld	W	D	L	GF	GA	GD	Pts	Qualification
1	Costa Rica	2	2	0	0	79	50	+29	4	2022 South and Central American Championship
2	El Salvador	2	1	0	1	48	54	−6	2	
3	Honduras (H)	2	0	0	2	46	69	−23	0	

Source: SCAHC
Rules for classification: 1) Points; 2) Head-to-head points; 3) Head-to-head goal difference; 4) Head-to-head goals scored; 5) Goal difference; 6) Goals scored; 7) Draw.
(H) Hosts

== Round robin ==
All times are local (UTC−06:00).

11 November 2021; 17:30	El Salvador	25 – 19	Honduras	Complejo Deportivio UPNFM, Tegucigalpa; Attendance: 150; Referees: Ramirez, Moraga (CRC)
11 November 2021; 17:30	Ramos 8	(11 – 8)	Garcia 5	Complejo Deportivio UPNFM, Tegucigalpa; Attendance: 150; Referees: Ramirez, Moraga (CRC)
11 November 2021; 17:30	8× (suspension)	Report	1× (yellow card) 7× (suspension)	Complejo Deportivio UPNFM, Tegucigalpa; Attendance: 150; Referees: Ramirez, Moraga (CRC)

12 November 2021; 17:30	Costa Rica	35 – 23	El Salvador	Polideportivo UPNFM, Tegucigalpa; Attendance: 50; Referees: Pagoaga, Zambrano (HON)
12 November 2021; 17:30	Martinez 10	(18 – 15)	Ramos 6	Polideportivo UPNFM, Tegucigalpa; Attendance: 50; Referees: Pagoaga, Zambrano (HON)
12 November 2021; 17:30	1× (yellow card) 3× (suspension)	Report	1× (yellow card) 4× (suspension)	Polideportivo UPNFM, Tegucigalpa; Attendance: 50; Referees: Pagoaga, Zambrano (HON)

13 November 2021; 14:00	Honduras	27 – 44	Costa Rica	Polideportivo UPNFM, Tegucigalpa; Attendance: 150; Referees: Pagoaga, Zambrano (HON)
13 November 2021; 14:00	Moreno 5	(12 – 19)	Obando 8	Polideportivo UPNFM, Tegucigalpa; Attendance: 150; Referees: Pagoaga, Zambrano (HON)
13 November 2021; 14:00	1× (yellow card) 5× (suspension)	Report	1× (yellow card) 3× (suspension)	Polideportivo UPNFM, Tegucigalpa; Attendance: 150; Referees: Pagoaga, Zambrano (HON)
