= 2024 South and Central American Men's Handball Championship =

Handball tournament in Buenos Aires, Argentina

Tournament details
- Host country: Argentina
- Venue(s): 1 (in 1 host city)
- Dates: 16–20 January
- Teams: 6 (from 1 confederation)

Final positions
- Champions: Brazil (2nd title)
- Runners-up: Argentina
- Third place: Chile
- Fourth place: Paraguay

Tournament statistics
- Matches played: 15
- Goals scored: 845 (56.33 per match)
- Attendance: 13,290 (886 per match)
- Top scorer(s): (Brazil) Rudolph Hackbarth (38 goals)

The 2024 South and Central American Men's Handball Championship was the third edition of the South and Central American Men's Handball Championship, held from 16 to 20 January 2024 in Buenos Aires, Argentina. It acted as the South and Central American qualifying tournament for the 2025 World Men's Handball Championship.

Brazil won their second title after winning all games.

== Qualified teams ==
Competition	Dates	Vacancies	Country	Previous appearances in tournament
Host nation		1	Argentina	2 (**2020**, 2022)
Invited nations who confirmed presence		4	Brazil	2 (2020, **2022**)
Invited nations who confirmed presence		4	Chile	2 (2020, 2022)
Invited nations who confirmed presence		4	Paraguay	2 (2020, 2022)
Invited nations who confirmed presence		4	Uruguay	2 (2020, 2022)
2023 Central American Men's Handball Championship	21–25 February 2023	1	Costa Rica	1 (2022)

Note: Bold indicates champion for that year. Italic indicates host for that year.

== Standings ==
Pos	Team	Pld	W	D	L	GF	GA	GD	Pts	Qualification
1st place, gold medalist(s)	Brazil	5	5	0	0	207	103	+104	10	2025 World Championship
2nd place, silver medalist(s)	Argentina (H)	5	3	1	1	173	101	+72	7 (Note: Argentina 27–27 Chile)	2025 World Championship
3rd place, bronze medalist(s)	Chile	5	3	1	1	151	107	+44	7	2025 World Championship
4	Paraguay	5	2	0	3	114	188	−74	4	
5	Uruguay	5	1	0	4	113	151	−38	2	
6	Costa Rica	5	0	0	5	87	195	−108	0	

Source: SCAHC
Rules for classification: 1) points; 2) head-to-head points; 3) head-to-head goal difference; 4) head-to-head number of goals scored; 5) goal difference.
(H) Hosts

== Results ==
All times are local (UTC−3).

16 January 2024; 15:30	**Chile**	**32–16**	**Paraguay**	La Casa del Handball Argentino, Buenos Aires; Attendance: 300; Referees: Godoy, Magalhães (BRA)
16 January 2024; 15:30	Scaramelli 7	(19–9)	J. Duarte 7	La Casa del Handball Argentino, Buenos Aires; Attendance: 300; Referees: Godoy, Magalhães (BRA)
16 January 2024; 15:30	3× (suspension)	Report	1× (yellow card) 4× (suspension)	La Casa del Handball Argentino, Buenos Aires; Attendance: 300; Referees: Godoy, Magalhães (BRA)

16 January 2024; 18:00	**Brazil**	**41–16**	**Uruguay**	La Casa del Handball Argentino, Buenos Aires; Attendance: 400; Referees: Converse, Correa (ARG)
16 January 2024; 18:00	Hackbarth 8	(22–5)	Ancheta 3	La Casa del Handball Argentino, Buenos Aires; Attendance: 400; Referees: Converse, Correa (ARG)
16 January 2024; 18:00	4× (suspension) 3× (red card)	Report	2× (suspension)	La Casa del Handball Argentino, Buenos Aires; Attendance: 400; Referees: Converse, Correa (ARG)

16 January 2024; 20:30	**Argentina**	**41–13**	**Costa Rica**	La Casa del Handball Argentino, Buenos Aires; Attendance: 2,100; Referees: Lemes, Sosa (URU)
16 January 2024; 20:30	Fernández 7	(21–8)	Villalta 3	La Casa del Handball Argentino, Buenos Aires; Attendance: 2,100; Referees: Lemes, Sosa (URU)
16 January 2024; 20:30	1× (yellow card) 7× (suspension)	Report	1× (yellow card) 6× (suspension)	La Casa del Handball Argentino, Buenos Aires; Attendance: 2,100; Referees: Lemes, Sosa (URU)

17 January 2024; 15:30	**Paraguay**	**22–57**	**Brazil**	La Casa del Handball Argentino, Buenos Aires; Attendance: 320; Referees: Lenci, López (ARG)
17 January 2024; 15:30	A. Duarte, J. Duarte 4	(11–26)	Hackbarth 12	La Casa del Handball Argentino, Buenos Aires; Attendance: 320; Referees: Lenci, López (ARG)
17 January 2024; 15:30	1× (suspension)	Report	1× (suspension)	La Casa del Handball Argentino, Buenos Aires; Attendance: 320; Referees: Lenci, López (ARG)

17 January 2024; 18:00	**Costa Rica**	**12–35**	**Chile**	La Casa del Handball Argentino, Buenos Aires; Attendance: 300; Referees: Lemes, Sosa (URU)
17 January 2024; 18:00	Jiménez 3	(6–19)	Feuchtmann, Scaramelli 5	La Casa del Handball Argentino, Buenos Aires; Attendance: 300; Referees: Lemes, Sosa (URU)
17 January 2024; 18:00	6× (suspension) 1× (red card)	Report	2× (suspension)	La Casa del Handball Argentino, Buenos Aires; Attendance: 300; Referees: Lemes, Sosa (URU)

17 January 2024; 20:30	**Uruguay**	**17–32**	**Argentina**	La Casa del Handball Argentino, Buenos Aires; Attendance: 1,000; Referees: Godoy, Magalhães (BRA)
17 January 2024; 20:30	Méndez 5	(8–14)	F. Pizarro 6	La Casa del Handball Argentino, Buenos Aires; Attendance: 1,000; Referees: Godoy, Magalhães (BRA)
17 January 2024; 20:30	4× (suspension)	Report	2× (yellow card) 4× (suspension)	La Casa del Handball Argentino, Buenos Aires; Attendance: 1,000; Referees: Godoy, Magalhães (BRA)

18 January 2024; 15:30	**Uruguay**	**24–26**	**Paraguay**	La Casa del Handball Argentino, Buenos Aires; Attendance: 100; Referees: Conberse, Correa (ARG)
18 January 2024; 15:30	Rubbo 8	(13–13)	J. Duarte 7	La Casa del Handball Argentino, Buenos Aires; Attendance: 100; Referees: Conberse, Correa (ARG)
18 January 2024; 15:30	1× (yellow card) 2× (suspension)	Report	5× (suspension)	La Casa del Handball Argentino, Buenos Aires; Attendance: 100; Referees: Conberse, Correa (ARG)

18 January 2024; 18:00	**Brazil**	**47–11**	**Costa Rica**	La Casa del Handball Argentino, Buenos Aires; Attendance: 350; Referees: Lenci, López (ARG)
18 January 2024; 18:00	Torriani 11	(25–4)	Suárez 3	La Casa del Handball Argentino, Buenos Aires; Attendance: 350; Referees: Lenci, López (ARG)
18 January 2024; 18:00	3× (suspension)	Report	1× (suspension) 1× (red card)	La Casa del Handball Argentino, Buenos Aires; Attendance: 350; Referees: Lenci, López (ARG)

18 January 2024; 20:30	**Argentina**	**27–27**	**Chile**	La Casa del Handball Argentino, Buenos Aires; Attendance: 1,800; Referees: Godoy, Magalhães (BRA)
18 January 2024; 20:30	Simonet 5	(15–14)	Feuchtmann 6	La Casa del Handball Argentino, Buenos Aires; Attendance: 1,800; Referees: Godoy, Magalhães (BRA)
18 January 2024; 20:30	3× (yellow card) 2× (suspension)	Report	3× (suspension)	La Casa del Handball Argentino, Buenos Aires; Attendance: 1,800; Referees: Godoy, Magalhães (BRA)

19 January 2024; 15:30	**Costa Rica**	**23–38**	**Uruguay**	La Casa del Handball Argentino, Buenos Aires; Attendance: 150; Referees: Godoy, Magalhães (BRA)
19 January 2024; 15:30	three players 5	(6–20)	Rubbo 6	La Casa del Handball Argentino, Buenos Aires; Attendance: 150; Referees: Godoy, Magalhães (BRA)
19 January 2024; 15:30	1× (yellow card) 4× (suspension)	Report	1× (yellow card) 2× (suspension)	La Casa del Handball Argentino, Buenos Aires; Attendance: 150; Referees: Godoy, Magalhães (BRA)

19 January 2024; 18:00	**Chile**	**28–34**	**Brazil**	La Casa del Handball Argentino, Buenos Aires; Attendance: 350; Referees: Lenci, López (ARG)
19 January 2024; 18:00	Feuchtmann 7	(12–15)	Dutra, Hackbarth 8	La Casa del Handball Argentino, Buenos Aires; Attendance: 350; Referees: Lenci, López (ARG)
19 January 2024; 18:00	1× (yellow card) 1× (suspension) 1× (red card)	Report	2× (yellow card) 3× (suspension) 1× (red card)	La Casa del Handball Argentino, Buenos Aires; Attendance: 350; Referees: Lenci, López (ARG)

19 January 2024; 20:30	**Argentina**	**47–16**	**Paraguay**	La Casa del Handball Argentino, Buenos Aires; Attendance: 1,800; Referees: Lemes, Sosa (URU)
19 January 2024; 20:30	R. Martínez, Pizarro 7	(21–8)	J. Mendoza, Viana 3	La Casa del Handball Argentino, Buenos Aires; Attendance: 1,800; Referees: Lemes, Sosa (URU)
19 January 2024; 20:30	1× (yellow card) 2× (suspension)	Report	5× (suspension)	La Casa del Handball Argentino, Buenos Aires; Attendance: 1,800; Referees: Lemes, Sosa (URU)

20 January 2024; 15:30	**Paraguay**	**35–29**	**Costa Rica**	La Casa del Handball Argentino, Buenos Aires; Attendance: 420; Referees: Conberse, Correa (ARG)
20 January 2024; 15:30	J. Duarte 8	(16–13)	Suárez 7	La Casa del Handball Argentino, Buenos Aires; Attendance: 420; Referees: Conberse, Correa (ARG)
20 January 2024; 15:30	2× (suspension)	Report	1× (suspension)	La Casa del Handball Argentino, Buenos Aires; Attendance: 420; Referees: Conberse, Correa (ARG)

20 January 2024; 18:00	**Chile**	**29–18**	**Uruguay**	La Casa del Handball Argentino, Buenos Aires; Attendance: 1,900; Referees: Lenci, López (ARG)
20 January 2024; 18:00	Codina 7	(13–10)	Martín, Rubbo 5	La Casa del Handball Argentino, Buenos Aires; Attendance: 1,900; Referees: Lenci, López (ARG)
20 January 2024; 18:00	1× (yellow card) 1× (suspension)	Report	1× (yellow card) 1× (red card)	La Casa del Handball Argentino, Buenos Aires; Attendance: 1,900; Referees: Lenci, López (ARG)

20 January 2024; 20:30	**Brazil**	**28–26**	**Argentina**	La Casa del Handball Argentino, Buenos Aires; Attendance: 2,000; Referees: Lemes, Sosa (URU)
20 January 2024; 20:30	Carvalho, Langaro 6	(13–14)	Baronetto 6	La Casa del Handball Argentino, Buenos Aires; Attendance: 2,000; Referees: Lemes, Sosa (URU)
20 January 2024; 20:30	2× (yellow card) 9× (suspension) 1× (red card)	Report	2× (yellow card) 5× (suspension)	La Casa del Handball Argentino, Buenos Aires; Attendance: 2,000; Referees: Lemes, Sosa (URU)

== Team champion roster ==
**2022 South and Central American Men's Champions**

**Brazil**
**Second title**

Team roster: Guilherme Torriani, Joel Santos, Guilherme Borges, Thiagus Petrus, Rangel da Rosa, Washington Santos, Vinicius Teixeira, Leonardo Abrahão, Leonardo Dutra, Haniel Langaro, Vinicios Carvalho, Rudolph Hackbarth, Bryan Monte, Acácio Moreira, Gustavo Rodrigues, Mateus Martins.
Head coach: Marcus "Tatá" Oliveira.
