= 2022 South and Central American Men's Handball Championship =

Tournament details
- Host country: Brazil
- Venue: 1 (in 1 host city)
- Dates: 25–29 January
- Teams: 7 (from 1 confederation)

Final positions
- Champions: Brazil (1st title)
- Runners-up: Argentina
- Third place: Chile
- Fourth place: Uruguay

Tournament statistics
- Matches played: 15
- Goals scored: 860 (57.33 per match)
- Top scorers: (Chile) Erwin Feuchtmann (43 goals)

Awards
- Best player: (Brazil) Thiagus dos Santos

The 2022 South and Central American Men's Handball Championship was the second edition of the South and Central American Men's Handball Championship, held from 25 to 29 January 2022 in Recife, Brazil. It acted as the South and Central American qualifying tournament for the 2023 World Men's Handball Championship.

Brazil won their first title after defeating Argentina in the final.

== Qualified teams ==
Competition	Dates	Vacancies	Country	Previous appearances in tournament
Host nation		1	Brazil	1 (2020)
Invited nations who confirmed presence		6	Argentina	1 (**2020**)
Invited nations who confirmed presence		6	Bolivia	1 (2020)
Invited nations who confirmed presence		6	Chile	1 (2020)
Invited nations who confirmed presence		6	~~Colombia~~	0 (debut)
Invited nations who confirmed presence		6	Paraguay	1 (2020)
Invited nations who confirmed presence		6	Uruguay	1 (2020)
2021 Central American Men's Handball Championship	11–13 November 2021	1	Costa Rica	0 (debut)

Colombia withdrew before the tournament, due to several positive COVID-19 tests in their team.

Note: Bold indicates champion for that year. Italic indicates host for that year.

== Draw ==
The draw took place on 14 January 2022.

=== Seeding ===
Pot 1	Pot 2	Pot 3	Pot 4
Argentina; Brazil	Uruguay; Chile	Paraguay; Bolivia	~~Colombia~~; Costa Rica

== Preliminary round ==
All times are local (UTC−3).

=== Group A ===
Pos	Team	Pld	W	D	L	GF	GA	GD	Pts	Qualification
1	Argentina	2	2	0	0	113	26	+87	**4**	Semifinals
2	Uruguay	2	1	0	1	60	52	+8	**2**	Semifinals
3	Bolivia	2	0	0	2	17	112	−95	**0**	

Source: SCA
Rules for classification: 1) points; 2) head-to-head points; 3) head-to-head goal difference; 4) head-to-head number of goals scored; 5) goal difference.

25 January 2022; 17:00	**Argentina**	**70–8**	**Bolivia**	Ginásio de Esportes Geraldo Magalhães, Recife; Attendance: 300; Referees: Geraldello, Marques (BRA)
25 January 2022; 17:00	Pizarro 14	(36–5)	Rojas 4	Ginásio de Esportes Geraldo Magalhães, Recife; Attendance: 300; Referees: Geraldello, Marques (BRA)
25 January 2022; 17:00	3× (suspension)	Report	2× (suspension)	Ginásio de Esportes Geraldo Magalhães, Recife; Attendance: 300; Referees: Geraldello, Marques (BRA)

26 January 2022; 16:00	**Bolivia**	**9–42**	**Uruguay**	Ginásio de Esportes Geraldo Magalhães, Recife; Referees: Correa, Correa (BRA)
26 January 2022; 16:00	Zurita 3	(1–18)	Rubbo 8	Ginásio de Esportes Geraldo Magalhães, Recife; Referees: Correa, Correa (BRA)
26 January 2022; 16:00	1× (suspension)	Report	2× (yellow card) 3× (suspension)	Ginásio de Esportes Geraldo Magalhães, Recife; Referees: Correa, Correa (BRA)

27 January 2022; 18:00	**Argentina**	**43–18**	**Uruguay**	Ginásio de Esportes Geraldo Magalhães, Recife; Attendance: 300; Referees: Geraldello, Marques (BRA)
27 January 2022; 18:00	Baronetto 8	(18–9)	Ancheta, Fabra 3	Ginásio de Esportes Geraldo Magalhães, Recife; Attendance: 300; Referees: Geraldello, Marques (BRA)
27 January 2022; 18:00	4× (suspension)	Report	1× (yellow card) 9× (suspension) 1× (red card)	Ginásio de Esportes Geraldo Magalhães, Recife; Attendance: 300; Referees: Geraldello, Marques (BRA)

=== Group B ===
Pos	Team	Pld	W	D	L	GF	GA	GD	Pts	Qualification
1	Brazil (H)	3	3	0	0	126	54	+72	**6**	Semifinals
2	Chile	3	2	0	1	99	72	+27	**4**	Semifinals
3	Paraguay	3	1	0	2	75	113	−38	**2**	
4	Costa Rica	3	0	0	3	53	114	−61	**0**	

Source: SCA
Rules for classification: 1) points; 2) head-to-head points; 3) head-to-head goal difference; 4) head-to-head number of goals scored; 5) goal difference.
(H) Hosts

25 January 2022; 15:00	**Chile**	**34–16**	**Costa Rica**	Ginásio de Esportes Geraldo Magalhães, Recife; Attendance: 150; Referees: Konjičanin, Konjičanin (BIH)
25 January 2022; 15:00	Er. Feuchtmann 6	(20–8)	Villegas 4	Ginásio de Esportes Geraldo Magalhães, Recife; Attendance: 150; Referees: Konjičanin, Konjičanin (BIH)
25 January 2022; 15:00	4× (suspension)	Report	4× (suspension)	Ginásio de Esportes Geraldo Magalhães, Recife; Attendance: 150; Referees: Konjičanin, Konjičanin (BIH)

25 January 2022; 20:00	**Brazil**	**46–19**	**Paraguay**	Ginásio de Esportes Geraldo Magalhães, Recife; Attendance: 300; Referees: Araújo, Perdomo (URU)
25 January 2022; 20:00	Hackbarth 11	(23–12)	Fiore 6	Ginásio de Esportes Geraldo Magalhães, Recife; Attendance: 300; Referees: Araújo, Perdomo (URU)
25 January 2022; 20:00	2× (suspension)	Report	4× (suspension)	Ginásio de Esportes Geraldo Magalhães, Recife; Attendance: 300; Referees: Araújo, Perdomo (URU)

26 January 2022; 18:00	**Paraguay**	**25–43**	**Chile**	Ginásio de Esportes Geraldo Magalhães, Recife; Attendance: 280; Referees: Conberse, Correa (ARG)
26 January 2022; 18:00	Samaniego 7	(13–22)	Er. Feuchtmann 11	Ginásio de Esportes Geraldo Magalhães, Recife; Attendance: 280; Referees: Conberse, Correa (ARG)
26 January 2022; 18:00	1× (yellow card) 5× (suspension) 1× (red card)	Report	5× (suspension)	Ginásio de Esportes Geraldo Magalhães, Recife; Attendance: 280; Referees: Conberse, Correa (ARG)

26 January 2022; 20:00	**Brazil**	**49–13**	**Costa Rica**	Ginásio de Esportes Geraldo Magalhães, Recife; Attendance: 300; Referees: Araújo, Perdomo (URU)
26 January 2022; 20:00	Chiuffa 10	(27–7)	Gutiérrez 4	Ginásio de Esportes Geraldo Magalhães, Recife; Attendance: 300; Referees: Araújo, Perdomo (URU)
26 January 2022; 20:00	2× (suspension)	Report	3× (suspension)	Ginásio de Esportes Geraldo Magalhães, Recife; Attendance: 300; Referees: Araújo, Perdomo (URU)

27 January 2022; 16:00	**Costa Rica**	**24–31**	**Paraguay**	Ginásio de Esportes Geraldo Magalhães, Recife; Attendance: 280; Referees: Correa, Correa (BRA)
27 January 2022; 16:00	Molina 5	(12–18)	Fiore, Martínez 6	Ginásio de Esportes Geraldo Magalhães, Recife; Attendance: 280; Referees: Correa, Correa (BRA)
27 January 2022; 16:00	1× (yellow card) 2× (suspension)	Report	1× (yellow card) 3× (suspension)	Ginásio de Esportes Geraldo Magalhães, Recife; Attendance: 280; Referees: Correa, Correa (BRA)

27 January 2022; 20:00	**Brazil**	**31–22**	**Chile**	Ginásio de Esportes Geraldo Magalhães, Recife; Attendance: 300; Referees: Konjičanin, Konjičanin (BIH)
27 January 2022; 20:00	Langaro 5	(16–13)	Er. Feuchtmann 10	Ginásio de Esportes Geraldo Magalhães, Recife; Attendance: 300; Referees: Konjičanin, Konjičanin (BIH)
27 January 2022; 20:00	1× (yellow card) 3× (suspension)	Report	1× (yellow card) 2× (suspension)	Ginásio de Esportes Geraldo Magalhães, Recife; Attendance: 300; Referees: Konjičanin, Konjičanin (BIH)

== Knockout stage ==
=== Bracket ===
Semi-finals
28 January
**Argentina**	**36**
Chile	24
28 January
**Brazil**	**48**
Uruguay	20

Final
29 January
Argentina	17
**Brazil**	**20**
Third place
29 January
**Chile**	**29**
Uruguay	21

=== 5–7th place semifinal ===
28 January 2022; 16:00	**Bolivia**	**16–39**	**Costa Rica**	Ginásio de Esportes Geraldo Magalhães, Recife; Attendance: 300; Referees: Correa, Correa (BRA)
28 January 2022; 16:00	Lisidro 4	(8–22)	Gutiérrez 5	Ginásio de Esportes Geraldo Magalhães, Recife; Attendance: 300; Referees: Correa, Correa (BRA)
28 January 2022; 16:00	1× (yellow card) 2× (suspension)	Report	1× (yellow card) 7× (suspension)	Ginásio de Esportes Geraldo Magalhães, Recife; Attendance: 300; Referees: Correa, Correa (BRA)

=== Semifinals ===
28 January 2022; 18:00	**Argentina**	**36–24**	**Chile**	Ginásio de Esportes Geraldo Magalhães, Recife; Attendance: 300; Referees: Konjičanin, Konjičanin (BIH)
28 January 2022; 18:00	Fernández 8	(17–11)	Er. Feuchtmann 10	Ginásio de Esportes Geraldo Magalhães, Recife; Attendance: 300; Referees: Konjičanin, Konjičanin (BIH)
28 January 2022; 18:00	4× (suspension)	Report	1× (yellow card) 5× (suspension) 2× (red card)	Ginásio de Esportes Geraldo Magalhães, Recife; Attendance: 300; Referees: Konjičanin, Konjičanin (BIH)

28 January 2022; 20:00	**Brazil**	**48–20**	**Uruguay**	Ginásio de Esportes Geraldo Magalhães, Recife; Attendance: 300; Referees: Conberse, Correa (ARG)
28 January 2022; 20:00	Dutra, Hackbarth 8	(21–10)	Borba 5	Ginásio de Esportes Geraldo Magalhães, Recife; Attendance: 300; Referees: Conberse, Correa (ARG)
28 January 2022; 20:00	3× (suspension)	Report	1× (yellow card) 3× (suspension) 1× (red card)	Ginásio de Esportes Geraldo Magalhães, Recife; Attendance: 300; Referees: Conberse, Correa (ARG)

=== Fifth place game ===
29 January 2022; 16:00	**Paraguay**	**26–21**	**Costa Rica**	Ginásio de Esportes Geraldo Magalhães, Recife; Attendance: 1,000; Referees: Araújo, Perdomo (URU)
29 January 2022; 16:00	Gonzales, Samaniego 4	(12–9)	Molina 8	Ginásio de Esportes Geraldo Magalhães, Recife; Attendance: 1,000; Referees: Araújo, Perdomo (URU)
29 January 2022; 16:00	1× (yellow card) 7× (suspension)	Report	1× (yellow card) 5× (suspension)	Ginásio de Esportes Geraldo Magalhães, Recife; Attendance: 1,000; Referees: Araújo, Perdomo (URU)

=== Third place game ===
29 January 2022; 18:00	**Chile**	**29–21**	**Uruguay**	Ginásio de Esportes Geraldo Magalhães, Recife; Attendance: 1,000; Referees: Conberse, Correa (ARG)
29 January 2022; 18:00	Er. Feuchtmann 6	(16–11)	Rubbo 5	Ginásio de Esportes Geraldo Magalhães, Recife; Attendance: 1,000; Referees: Conberse, Correa (ARG)
29 January 2022; 18:00	3× (yellow card) 8× (suspension)	Report	5× (suspension)	Ginásio de Esportes Geraldo Magalhães, Recife; Attendance: 1,000; Referees: Conberse, Correa (ARG)

=== Final ===
29 January 2022; 20:00	**Argentina**	**17–20**	**Brazil**	Ginásio de Esportes Geraldo Magalhães, Recife; Attendance: 1,000; Referees: Konjičanin, Konjičanin (BIH)
29 January 2022; 20:00	Parker 5	(10–10)	Hackbarth 5	Ginásio de Esportes Geraldo Magalhães, Recife; Attendance: 1,000; Referees: Konjičanin, Konjičanin (BIH)
29 January 2022; 20:00	1× (yellow card) 2× (suspension)	Report	1× (yellow card) 4× (suspension)	Ginásio de Esportes Geraldo Magalhães, Recife; Attendance: 1,000; Referees: Konjičanin, Konjičanin (BIH)

== Final standings ==
Rank	Team
Gold medal	Brazil
Silver medal	Argentina
Bronze medal	Chile
4	Uruguay
5	Paraguay
6	Costa Rica
7	Bolivia

Qualified for the 2023 World Men's Handball Championship

**2022 South and Central American Men's Champions**

**Brazil**
**First title**

Team roster: João Silva, Guilherme Borges, Arthur Souza, Cléber Andrade, Rogério Moraes, Thiagus Petrus, Rangel da Rosa, Guilherme Torriani, Fábio Chiuffa, Leonardo Dutra, Thiago Ponciano, Haniel Langaro, Raul Nantes, Rudolph Hackbarth, César Almeida, Gustavo Rodrigues.
Head coach: Marcus "Tatá" Oliveira.

== All-star team ==
The all-star team was announced on 31 January 2022.

Position	Player
Most valuable player	(Brazil) Thiagus dos Santos
Goalkeeper	(Argentina) Leonel Maciel
Right wing	(Brazil) Rudolph Hackbarth
Right back	(Chile) Rodrigo Salinas Muñoz
Centre back	(Brazil) João Pedro Silva
Left back	(Argentina) James Parker
Left wing	(Argentina) Ignacio Pizarro
Pivot	(Brazil) Rogério Moraes Ferreira

== Top goalscorers ==
Rank	Name	Goals
1	(Chile) Erwin Feuchtmann	43
2	(Brazil) Rudolph Hackbarth	35
3	(Argentina) Federico Gastón Fernández	26
4	(Brazil) Guilherme Torriani	24
5	(Brazil) Gustavo Rodrigues	19
5	(Brazil) Fábio Chiuffa	19
7	(Chile) Esteban Salinas	18
7	(Costa Rica) David Molina	18
9	(Brazil) Leonardo Dutra	17
10	(Argentina) James Parker	16
11	(Uruguay) Federico Rubbo	15
11	(Costa Rica) Justin Gutierrez	15
