= Handball at the 2019 Pan American Games – Men's tournament =

Men's handball at the XVIII Pan American Games

Tournament details
- Host country: Peru
- Venue: 1 (in 1 host city)
- Dates: 31 July – 5 August
- Teams: 8 (from 2 confederations)

Final positions
- Champions: Argentina (2nd title)
- Runners-up: Chile
- Third place: Brazil
- Fourth place: Mexico

Tournament statistics
- Matches played: 20
- Goals scored: 1,068 (53.4 per match)
- Top scorers: (Chile) Erwin Feuchtmann (34 goals)

The handball men's tournament at the 2019 Pan American Games in Lima, Peru was held between 31 July and 5 August 2019. Eight nations participated.

== Qualification ==
A total of eight men's teams qualified to compete at the games in each tournament. The host nation (Peru) qualified in each tournament, along with seven other teams in various qualifying tournaments.

=== Summary ===
Event	Dates	Location	Vacancies	Qualified
Host nation	—N/a	—N/a	1	Peru
2018 South American Games	2–6 June	(Bolivia) Cochabamba	2	Brazil; Argentina
2018 Central American and Caribbean Games	27 July – 1 August	(Colombia) Barranquilla	3	Cuba; Puerto Rico; Mexico
2018 North Zone Qualifying	2–5 September	(United States) and (Canada)	1	United States
2019 Last chance qualification tournament	12–13 April	(Chile) Santiago	1	Chile
Total			8	

=== North Zone Qualifying ===
The North Zone Qualifying event opposed Canada to the United States :

2 September 2018	United States	36–24	Canada	Beard–Eaves–Memorial Coliseum, Auburn
2 September 2018		(18–14)		Beard–Eaves–Memorial Coliseum, Auburn

5 September 2018	Canada	27–27	United States	Montreal

United States won 63–51 on aggregate.

=== Last chance qualification tournament ===
Last chance qualification tournament opposed Chile (3rd placed finisher at the South American Games) and Colombia (5th at the Central American and Caribbean Games).

12 April 2019	Chile	36–26	Colombia	Polideportivo de Ñuñoa, Santiago
12 April 2019		(20–12)		Polideportivo de Ñuñoa, Santiago

13 April 2019	Colombia	23–40	Chile	Polideportivo de Ñuñoa, Santiago
13 April 2019		(10–21)		Polideportivo de Ñuñoa, Santiago

Chile won 76–49 on aggregate.

== Results ==
All times are in Peru Time. (UTC−5)

=== Preliminary round ===
==== Group A ====
Pos	Team	Pld	W	D	L	GF	GA	GD	Pts	Qualification
1	Argentina	3	3	0	0	92	75	+17	6	Semifinals
2	Chile	3	2	0	1	101	85	+16	4	Semifinals
3	United States	3	1	0	2	77	97	−20	2	5–8th place semifinals
4	Cuba	3	0	0	3	74	87	−13	0	5–8th place semifinals

Source: Lima 2019
Rules for classification: 1) points; 2) head-to-head points; 3) head-to-head goal difference; 4) head-to-head goals scored; 5) goal difference; 6) goals scored; 7) draw.

31 July 2019; 13:00	Cuba	28–38	Chile	Villa Deportiva Nacional; Referees: Raluy, Sabroso (ESP)
31 July 2019; 13:00	Corzo 8	(10–20)	Er. Feuchtmann, R. Salinas 10	Villa Deportiva Nacional; Referees: Raluy, Sabroso (ESP)
31 July 2019; 13:00	2× (yellow card) 2× (suspension)	Report	1× (yellow card) 6× (suspension)	Villa Deportiva Nacional; Referees: Raluy, Sabroso (ESP)

31 July 2019; 20:30	Argentina	38–25	United States	Villa Deportiva Nacional; Referees: Pinto, Menezes (BRA)
31 July 2019; 20:30	Baronetto 7	(21–13)	Fofana 7	Villa Deportiva Nacional; Referees: Pinto, Menezes (BRA)
31 July 2019; 20:30	1× (yellow card) 6× (suspension)	Report	2× (yellow card) 7× (suspension)	Villa Deportiva Nacional; Referees: Pinto, Menezes (BRA)

1 August 2019; 15:30	United States	26−25	Cuba	Villa Deportiva Nacional; Referees: Lenci, López (ARG)
1 August 2019; 15:30	Hoddersen 7	(14−14)	Taboada, Veitía 5	Villa Deportiva Nacional; Referees: Lenci, López (ARG)
1 August 2019; 15:30	1× (yellow card) 4× (suspension)	Report	2× (yellow card) 2× (suspension)	Villa Deportiva Nacional; Referees: Lenci, López (ARG)

1 August 2019; 20:30	Chile	29−31	Argentina	Villa Deportiva Nacional; Referees: Raluy, Sabroso (ESP)
1 August 2019; 20:30	Er. Feuchtmann 7	(15−12)	Simonet 8	Villa Deportiva Nacional; Referees: Raluy, Sabroso (ESP)
1 August 2019; 20:30	3× (yellow card) 8× (suspension) 1× (red card)	Report	3× (yellow card) 6× (suspension)	Villa Deportiva Nacional; Referees: Raluy, Sabroso (ESP)

2 August 2019; 13:00	United States	26−34	Chile	Villa Deportiva Nacional; Referees: Sosa, Lemes (URU)
2 August 2019; 13:00	Hines 5	(11−17)	Ceballos, R. Salinas 8	Villa Deportiva Nacional; Referees: Sosa, Lemes (URU)
2 August 2019; 13:00	3× (yellow card) 3× (suspension)	Boxscore	1× (yellow card) 4× (suspension)	Villa Deportiva Nacional; Referees: Sosa, Lemes (URU)

2 August 2019; 18:00	Argentina	23–21	Cuba	Villa Deportiva Nacional; Referees: Pinto, Menezes (BRA)
2 August 2019; 18:00	F. Pizarro 6	(11–10)	Corzo 5	Villa Deportiva Nacional; Referees: Pinto, Menezes (BRA)
2 August 2019; 18:00	4× (yellow card) 6× (suspension)	Report	2× (yellow card) 7× (suspension) 1× (red card)	Villa Deportiva Nacional; Referees: Pinto, Menezes (BRA)

==== Group B ====
Pos	Team	Pld	W	D	L	GF	GA	GD	Pts	Qualification
1	Brazil	3	3	0	0	108	65	+43	6	Semifinals
2	Mexico	3	2	0	1	81	69	+12	4	Semifinals
3	Puerto Rico	3	1	0	2	72	82	−10	2	5–8th place semifinals
4	Peru (H)	3	0	0	3	56	101	−45	0	5–8th place semifinals

Source: Lima 2019
Rules for classification: 1) points; 2) head-to-head points; 3) head-to-head goal difference; 4) head-to-head goals scored; 5) goal difference; 6) goals scored; 7) draw.
(H) Hosts

31 July 2019; 15:30	Puerto Rico	27–23	Peru	Villa Deportiva Nacional; Referees: Paolantoni, García (ARG)
31 July 2019; 15:30	Nazario 7	(14–10)	Velez 7	Villa Deportiva Nacional; Referees: Paolantoni, García (ARG)
31 July 2019; 15:30	2× (yellow card) 1× (suspension) 1× (red card)	Report	1× (yellow card) 5× (suspension)	Villa Deportiva Nacional; Referees: Paolantoni, García (ARG)

31 July 2019; 18:00	Brazil	33–23	Mexico	Villa Deportiva Nacional; Referees: Zuñiga, Reyes (CUB)
31 July 2019; 18:00	Borges 9	(18–10)	Al. Villalobos 8	Villa Deportiva Nacional; Referees: Zuñiga, Reyes (CUB)
31 July 2019; 18:00	1× (yellow card) 7× (suspension)	Report	1× (suspension)	Villa Deportiva Nacional; Referees: Zuñiga, Reyes (CUB)

1 August 2019; 13:00	Mexico	24–19	Puerto Rico	Villa Deportiva Nacional; Referees: Zuñiga, Reyes (CUB)
1 August 2019; 13:00	Morales 7	(15–7)	Nazario 7	Villa Deportiva Nacional; Referees: Zuñiga, Reyes (CUB)
1 August 2019; 13:00	2× (yellow card) 3× (suspension)	Report	1× (yellow card) 5× (suspension)	Villa Deportiva Nacional; Referees: Zuñiga, Reyes (CUB)

1 August 2019; 18:00	Peru	16–40	Brazil	Villa Deportiva Nacional; Referees: Pineda, Estrada (COL)
1 August 2019; 18:00	Velez 4	(7–27)	Chiuffa 10	Villa Deportiva Nacional; Referees: Pineda, Estrada (COL)
1 August 2019; 18:00	2× (suspension)	Report	2× (yellow card) 5× (suspension)	Villa Deportiva Nacional; Referees: Pineda, Estrada (COL)

2 August 2019; 17:30	Mexico	34–17	Peru	Villa Deportiva Nacional; Referees: Pineda, Estrada (COL)
2 August 2019; 17:30	Ávalos 9	(16–9)	Trelles, Zerillo 4	Villa Deportiva Nacional; Referees: Pineda, Estrada (COL)
2 August 2019; 17:30	5× (suspension)	Report	2× (yellow card) 3× (suspension)	Villa Deportiva Nacional; Referees: Pineda, Estrada (COL)

2 August 2019; 20:30	Brazil	35–26	Puerto Rico	Villa Deportiva Nacional; Referees: Lenci, López (ARG)
2 August 2019; 20:30	Nantes 9	(18–13)	Ceballos, Nazario 7	Villa Deportiva Nacional; Referees: Lenci, López (ARG)
2 August 2019; 20:30	1× (yellow card) 6× (suspension)	Report	1× (yellow card) 5× (suspension)	Villa Deportiva Nacional; Referees: Lenci, López (ARG)

=== Classification round ===
5–8th place semifinals
4 August — Lima
Puerto Rico	12
Cuba	36
4 August — Lima
United States	22
Peru	16

Fifth place
5 August — Lima
Cuba	32
United States	24
Seventh place
5 August — Lima
Puerto Rico	27
Peru	19

==== 5–8th place semifinals ====
4 August 2019; 10:00	Puerto Rico	12–36	Cuba	Villa Deportiva Nacional; Referees: Lenci, López (ARG)
4 August 2019; 10:00	four players 2	(8–17)	García, Taboada 6	Villa Deportiva Nacional; Referees: Lenci, López (ARG)
4 August 2019; 10:00	1× (yellow card) 1× (suspension)	Report	1× (yellow card) 2× (suspension)	Villa Deportiva Nacional; Referees: Lenci, López (ARG)

4 August 2019; 12:00	United States	22–16	Peru	Villa Deportiva Nacional; Referees: Pinto, Menezes (BRA)
4 August 2019; 12:00	Hoddersen 8	(13–7)	Alvarado, Zerillo 3	Villa Deportiva Nacional; Referees: Pinto, Menezes (BRA)
4 August 2019; 12:00	3× (yellow card) 2× (suspension)	Report	6× (suspension) 1× (red card)	Villa Deportiva Nacional; Referees: Pinto, Menezes (BRA)

==== Seventh place match ====
5 August 2019; 10:00	Puerto Rico	27–19	Peru	Villa Deportiva Nacional; Referees: Pineda, Estrada (COL)
5 August 2019; 10:00	Nazario 8	(12–9)	Zerillo 6	Villa Deportiva Nacional; Referees: Pineda, Estrada (COL)
5 August 2019; 10:00	1× (yellow card) 4× (suspension)	Report	2× (yellow card) 4× (suspension)	Villa Deportiva Nacional; Referees: Pineda, Estrada (COL)

==== Fifth place match ====
5 August 2019; 12:00	Cuba	32–24	United States	Villa Deportiva Nacional; Referees: Sosa, Lemes (URU)
5 August 2019; 12:00	Corzo, Toledano 5	(16–10)	Fofana 7	Villa Deportiva Nacional; Referees: Sosa, Lemes (URU)
5 August 2019; 12:00	1× (yellow card) 1× (suspension)	Report	3× (suspension) 1× (red card)	Villa Deportiva Nacional; Referees: Sosa, Lemes (URU)

=== Medal round ===
Semifinals
4 August — Lima
Brazil	29
Chile	32
4 August — Lima
Argentina	34
Mexico	14

Final
5 August — Lima
Chile	27
Argentina	31
Third place
5 August — Lima
Brazil	32
Mexico	20

==== Semifinals ====
4 August 2019; 18:00	Brazil	29–32	Chile	Villa Deportiva Nacional; Referees: Raluy, Sabroso (ESP)
4 August 2019; 18:00	Langaro 8	(15–18)	Ayala 7	Villa Deportiva Nacional; Referees: Raluy, Sabroso (ESP)
4 August 2019; 18:00	1× (yellow card) 4× (suspension)	Report	2× (yellow card) 3× (suspension)	Villa Deportiva Nacional; Referees: Raluy, Sabroso (ESP)

4 August 2019; 20:30	Argentina	34–14	Mexico	Villa Deportiva Nacional; Referees: Sosa, Lemes (URU)
4 August 2019; 20:30	F. Pizarro 9	(16–7)	Al. Villalobos 4	Villa Deportiva Nacional; Referees: Sosa, Lemes (URU)
4 August 2019; 20:30	1× (suspension)	Report	1× (yellow card) 1× (suspension)	Villa Deportiva Nacional; Referees: Sosa, Lemes (URU)

==== Bronze medal match ====
5 August 2019; 18:00	Brazil	32–20	Mexico	Villa Deportiva Nacional; Referees: Lenci, López (ARG)
5 August 2019; 18:00	four players 5	(16–10)	Sandoval 6	Villa Deportiva Nacional; Referees: Lenci, López (ARG)
5 August 2019; 18:00	2× (yellow card) 3× (suspension)	Report	1× (yellow card) 1× (suspension)	Villa Deportiva Nacional; Referees: Lenci, López (ARG)

==== Gold medal match ====
5 August 2019; 20:30	Chile	27–31	Argentina	Villa Deportiva Nacional; Referees: Raluy, Sabroso (ESP)
5 August 2019; 20:30	Er. Feuchtmann 7	(14–15)	Simonet 11	Villa Deportiva Nacional; Referees: Raluy, Sabroso (ESP)
5 August 2019; 20:30	4× (yellow card) 7× (suspension)	Report	1× (yellow card) 4× (suspension)	Villa Deportiva Nacional; Referees: Raluy, Sabroso (ESP)

== Ranking and statistics ==
Rank	Team
1st place, gold medalist(s)	Argentina
2nd place, silver medalist(s)	Chile
3rd place, bronze medalist(s)	Brazil
4	Mexico
5	Cuba
6	United States
7	Puerto Rico
8	Peru

Qualified for the 2020 Summer Olympics
Qualified for the Olympic Qualification Tournament

2019 Pan American Games winners

Argentina
Second title

=== Top scorers ===
Rank	Name	Goals	Shots	%
1	(Chile) Erwin Feuchtmann	34	50	68
2	(Brazil) Felipe Borges	31	44	70
3	(Puerto Rico) Jorge Nazario	31	50	62
4	(Chile) Rodrigo Salinas	31	52	60
5	(Argentina) Federico Pizarro	28	38	74

Source: Lima 2019 Archived 2019-08-06 at the Wayback Machine

=== Top goalkeepers ===
Rank	Name	%	Saves	Shots
1	(Argentina) Matías Schulz	39	41	104
2	(Brazil) Leonardo Terçariol	37	35	94
3	(Cuba) Alejandro Romero	36	41	114
4	(Chile) Felipe Barrientos	33	54	166
5	(Peru) Cedric Rivera	33	50	153

Source: Lima 2019 Archived 2019-08-06 at the Wayback Machine
