= South and Central American Men's Handball Championship =

Handball competition

- Most recent season or competition: 2026 South and Central American Men's Handball Championship
- Sport: Handball
- Founded: 2020
- First season: 2020
- No. of teams: 6
- Continent: SCAHC (South America/Central America)
- Most recent champion: Argentina (2nd title)
- Most titles: Argentina; Brazil (2 titles each)

The South and Central American Men's Handball Championship is the official competition for senior national handball teams of South America and Central America, and takes place every two years. In addition to crowning the South and Central American champions, the tournament also serves as a qualifying tournament for the World Handball Championship. The first tournament was held in 2020 in Maringá, Brazil.

== Summaries ==
Year	Host	Final			Third place match		
Year	Host	Champion	Score	Runner-up	Third place	Score	Fourth place
2020; Details	(Brazil); Maringá	Argentina	Round-robin	Brazil	Uruguay	Round-robin	Chile
2022; Details	(Brazil); Recife	Brazil	20–17	Argentina	Chile	29–21	Uruguay
2024; Details	(Argentina); Buenos Aires	Brazil	Round-robin	Argentina	Chile	Round-robin	Paraguay
2026; Details	(Paraguay); Asunción	Argentina	Round-robin	Brazil	Chile	Round-robin	Uruguay

== Medal table ==
Rank	Nation	Gold	Silver	Bronze	Total
1	Argentina	2	2	0	4
1	Brazil	2	2	0	4
3	Chile	0	0	3	3
4	Uruguay	0	0	1	1
Totals (4 entries)		4	4	4	12

== Participating nations ==
Team	(Brazil); 2020	(Brazil); 2022	(Argentina); 2024	(Paraguay); 2026	Years
Argentina	1st	2nd	2nd	1st	4
Bolivia	6th	7th			2
Brazil	2nd	1st	1st	2nd	4
Chile	4th	3rd	3rd	3rd	4
Costa Rica		6th	6th		2
Paraguay	5th	5th	4th	5th	4
Peru				6th	1
Uruguay	3rd	4th	5th	4th	4
Total	6	7	6	6	
