= Handball at the 2023 Pan American Games =

- Handball pictogram
- Venue: Gimnasio Polideportivo de Viña del Mar
- Start date: 24 October 2023
- End date: 4 November 2023
- No. of events: 2 (1 men, 1 women)
- Competitors: 224 from 11 nations

Handball competitions at the 2023 Pan American Games were held from 24 October to 4 November 2023. The venue for the competition was the Gimnasio Polideportivo located in Viña del Mar.

A total of eight men's and eight women's teams (each consisting up to 14 athletes) competed in each tournament. This means a total of 224 athletes competed at the games.

The winner of each competition qualified for the 2024 Summer Olympics in Paris, France.

== Qualification ==
Eight men's teams and eight women's teams qualified to compete at the games in each tournament. Chile, as the host nation, received automatic qualification in both tournaments, along with seven other teams.

=== Summary ===
Nation	Men's	Women's	Athletes
Argentina	Yes	Yes	28
Brazil	Yes	Yes	28
Canada		Yes	14
Chile	Yes	Yes	28
Cuba	Yes	Yes	28
Dominican Republic	Yes		14
Mexico	Yes		14
Paraguay		Yes	14
Puerto Rico		Yes	14
United States	Yes		14
Uruguay	Yes	Yes	28
Total: 11 NOCs	8	8	224

=== Men ===
Event	Dates	Location	Quota(s)	Qualified
Host Nation	—N/a	—N/a	1	Chile
2021 Junior Pan American Games	29 November – 4 December 2021	(Colombia) Cali	1	Brazil
2022 South American Games	11–15 October 2022	(Paraguay) Asunción	2	Argentina; Uruguay
USA–CAN Qualifying Round	9 & 11 March 2023	(United States) Colorado Springs	1	United States
2023 Central American and Caribbean Games	2–7 July 2023	(El Salvador) San Salvador	2	Cuba; Dominican Republic
Last chance qualification tournament	3–5 August 2023	(Paraguay) Luque	1	Mexico
Total			8	

=== Women ===
Event	Dates	Location	Quota(s)	Qualified
Host Nation	—N/a	—N/a	1	Chile
2021 Junior Pan American Games	23–28 November 2021	(Colombia) Cali	1	Argentina
2022 South American Games	6–10 October 2022	(Paraguay) Asunción	2	Brazil; Paraguay
USA–CAN Qualifying Round	10 & 13 November 2022	(United States) Lansing (Canada) Montreal	1	Canada
2023 Central American and Caribbean Games	24–29 June 2023	(El Salvador) San Salvador	2	Cuba; Puerto Rico
Last chance qualification tournament	25–27 August 2023	(Dominican Republic) Santo Domingo	1	Uruguay
Total			8	

== Medal summary ==
=== Medalists ===
Event	Gold	Silver	Bronze
Men's tournament	Argentina; Mariano Cánepa; Leonel Maciel; Juan Bar; Santiago Baronetto; Nicolás Bonanno; Federico Fernández; Nicolás Bono; Pedro Martínez; Gaston Mouriño; Federico Pizarro; Ignacio Pizarro; Diego Simonet; Pablo Simonet; Pablo Vainstein; James Parker	Brazil; João Silva; Thiagus Petrus; Leonardo Abrahão; José Toledo; Rogério Moraes; Rangel da Rosa; Matheus da Silva; Leonardo Dutra; Haniel Langaro; Leonardo Terçariol; Rudolph Hackbarth; Hugo Monte; Gustavo Rodrigues; Jean-Pierre Dupoux	Chile; Sebastián Ceballos; Emil Feuchtmann; Erwin Feuchtmann; Esteban Salinas; Felipe García; Benjamín Illesca; Vicente González; Rodrigo Salinas; Matías Paya; Daniel Ayala; Danilo Salgado; Cristián Moll Ramírez; Aaron Codina; Francisco Ahumada
Women's tournament	Brazil; Gabriela Moreschi; Bruna de Paula; Mariane Fernándes; Tamires Araújo; Ana Paula Rodrigues; Larissa Araújo; Adriana Cardoso; Giulia Guarieiro; Francielle da Rocha; Marcela Arounian; Jhennifer Lopes; Patricia Matieli; Renata Arruda; Mariana Costa	Argentina; Marisol Carratú; Sofía Rivadeneira; Manuela Pizzo; Ayelén García; Rocio Campigli; Luciana Mendoza; Fátima Rosalez; Giuliana Gavilán; Malena Cavo; Macarena Gandulfo; Elke Karsten; Carolina Bono; Micaela Casasola; Lucía Dalle Crode	Paraguay; Fátima Acuña; Ada Misknisch; Fernanda Insfrán; Kamila Rolon; Karina dos Santos; Kiara Vergara; Camila Feschenko; Delyne Leiva; Fátima Ocampos; María Paula Fernández; Belinda Bobadilla; Maggie Lugo; María Espinoza; Jazmín Mendoza

== See also ==
- Handball at the 2024 Summer Olympics
