= Handball at the 2026 South American Games =

Handball competitions at the 2026 South American Games

- Venue: Invencible Santa Fe
- Dates: September 16–26
- Competitors: 168 from 7 nations

Handball competitions at the 2026 South American Games in Rosario, Santa Fe, and Rafaela, Argentina, were held between September 16 and 26 at Invencible Santa Fe, located within Parque del Sur in Santa Fe.

A total of two tournaments were contested (one men's and one women's). The games gave direct qualifying spots for the 2027 Pan American Games to the top two teams in each tournament that have not qualified yet. Additionally, the third best ranked team that has not qualified yet will advance to a repechage for the qualification to the games.

== Participating nations ==
A total of 8 ODESUR nations will participate in the handball tournaments. Each nation was able to enter a maximum of 28 athletes (one team of up to 14 players per gender). Brazil and Colombia will only participate in the men's and women's tournaments, respectively, while the other five nations will compete in both events.

Nation	Men's	Women's
Argentina	Yes	Yes
Brazil	Yes	—N/a
Chile	Yes	Yes
Colombia	—N/a	Yes
Paraguay	Yes	Yes
Peru	Yes	Yes
Uruguay	Yes	Yes
Total: 7 NOCs	6/6	6/6

== Venue ==
(Argentina) Santa Fe
Microestadio Invencible Santa Fe
Capacity: 3,472

== Medal summary ==
=== Medal table ===
* Host nation (Argentina)

Rank	Nation	Gold	Silver	Bronze	Total
1	Argentina*	2	0	0	2
2	Chile	0	1	1	2
3	Paraguay	0	1	0	1
4	Brazil	0	0	1	1
Totals (4 entries)		2	2	2	6

=== Medalists ===
Event	Gold	Silver	Bronze
Men's tournament	Argentina; Julián Souto Cueto; Santiago Laborde; Francisco Colombo; Bautista Torossian; Tobias Torossian; Juan Bus Saldaña; Juan Ceccardi; Nicolás Rodríguez; Lionel Moyano; Pedro Martínez Camí; Agustín Forlino; Juan Saco; Pablo Minguez; Tiago Jerónimo; Alan Perznianko	Chile; Dante Caro; Maximiliano Cabrera; José Cárcamo; Arian Delgado; Erwin Feuchtmann; Javier Frelijj; Benjamín Illesca; Francisco Latorre; Esteban Menanteau; Nicolás Morales; Cristóbal Oyarzún; Sebastián Pavez; Danilo Salgado; Gaspar Serrano	Brazil; Álvaro Araújo; Davi Langaro; Gerson Ferreira; Gabriel Silva; Gabriel Souza; João Santos; Joel Santos; Kelvin Barros; Kauã Coutinho; Kaique Sá; Lucas Silva; Nicolas Ribera; Vinícius Teixeira; Washington Silva
Women's tournament	Argentina; Malena Cavo; Dolores García; Carolina Bono; Yamila Baggio; Carolina Luque; Candelaria Cuadrado; Zoe Oriolo; Miranda Kruk; Virginia Catera; Lola Nuñez; Milagros Schneider; Antonela Mena; Mora Carballo; Maria Mellano	Paraguay; Fernanda Insfrán; Ana Oliveira; Anna Macke; Fatima Ocampos; Milagros Samaniego; Renata Sosa; Jessica Fleitas; Evelyn Bogdanoff; Jazmín Mendoza; Delyne Leiva; Sabrina Fiore; Maggie Lugo; Fiorella Enriguez; Ahinara Lombardo	Chile; Maura Alvarez; Valeria Carrasco; Maria Correa; Madeleine Cortez; Catalina Galvez; Antonia Gómez; Monserrat Martínez; Catalina Moreno; Gabriela Muller; Pia Pacheco; Francisca Parra; Romina Ramírez; Amanda Riquelme; Catalina Valdivia

== Results ==
=== Men's tournament ===
Pos	Team	Pld	W	D	L	GF	GA	GD	Pts	Qualification
1st place, gold medalist(s)	Argentina (H)	5	4	1	0	144	89	+55	9	2027 Pan American Games
2nd place, silver medalist(s)	Chile	5	4	1	0	165	120	+45	9	2027 Pan American Games
3rd place, bronze medalist(s)	Brazil	5	3	0	2	140	108	+32	6	Last chance qualification tournament for the 2027 Pan American Games
4	Uruguay	5	2	0	3	119	136	−17	4	
5	Peru	5	1	0	4	92	176	−84	2	2027 Pan American Games as host
6	Paraguay	5	0	0	5	98	129	−31	0	

Source: Men's Team groups
Rules for classification: 1) points; 2) head-to-head points; 3) head-to-head goal difference; 4) head-to-head number of goals scored; 5) goal difference.
(H) Hosts

=== Women's tournament ===
Pos	Team	Pld	W	D	L	GF	GA	GD	Pts	Qualification
1st place, gold medalist(s)	Argentina (H)	5	4	1	0	156	93	+63	9	2027 Pan American Games
2nd place, silver medalist(s)	Paraguay	5	3	1	1	133	97	+36	7	2027 Pan American Games
3rd place, bronze medalist(s)	Chile	5	3	0	2	141	95	+46	6 (Note: Chile 25–19 Uruguay)	Last chance qualification tournament for the 2027 Pan American Games
4	Uruguay	5	3	0	2	159	93	+66	6	
5	Colombia	5	1	0	4	85	170	−85	2	
6	Peru	5	0	0	5	61	187	−126	0	2027 Pan American Games as host

Source: Tournament summary
Rules for classification: 1) points; 2) head-to-head points; 3) head-to-head goal difference; 4) head-to-head number of goals scored; 5) goal difference.
(H) Hosts
