= Antonela Mena =

Argentine handball player

Personal information
- Full name: Antonela Lucía Mena
- Born: 28 March 1988 (age 38) Buenos Aires, Argentina
- Height: 1.83 m (6 ft 0 in)

Sport
- Sport: Handball
- Position: Pivot
- Current club: CID Moreno

Senior clubs
- Years: Team
- 2007–2010: CIDECO
- 2010–2011: BM Bera Bera
- 2013–2014: CID Moreno
- 2015–2016: NS Luján
- 2016–: CID Moreno
National team
Years	Team	Apps	(Gls)
–	Argentina	182	(215)
Medal record
Pan American Games
Silver medal – second place	2011 Guadalajara	Team
Silver medal – second place	2015 Toronto	Team
Silver medal – second place	2019 Lima	Team
Bronze medal – third place	2007 Rio de Janeiro	Team
Pan American Championship
Bronze medal – third place	2009 Chile
Bronze medal – third place	2015 Cuba
Silver medal – second place	2017 Argentina
South and Central American Championship
Silver medal – second place	2018 Brazil
Silver medal – second place	2021 Paraguay
Silver medal – second place	2022 Argentina
South American Games
Bronze medal – third place	2022 Asunción	Team
Gold medal – first place	2026 Santa Fe	Team

Antonela Lucía Mena (born 28 March 1988) is an Argentine handball player for CID Moreno and the Argentina national team.

She participated at the 2011 World Women's Handball Championship in Brazil.

== Individual awards ==
- Best Pivot of Pan American Championship in 2009, 2015 and 2017
- Best Pivot of South and Central American Championship in 2022
