= Rocío Campigli =

Argentine handball player

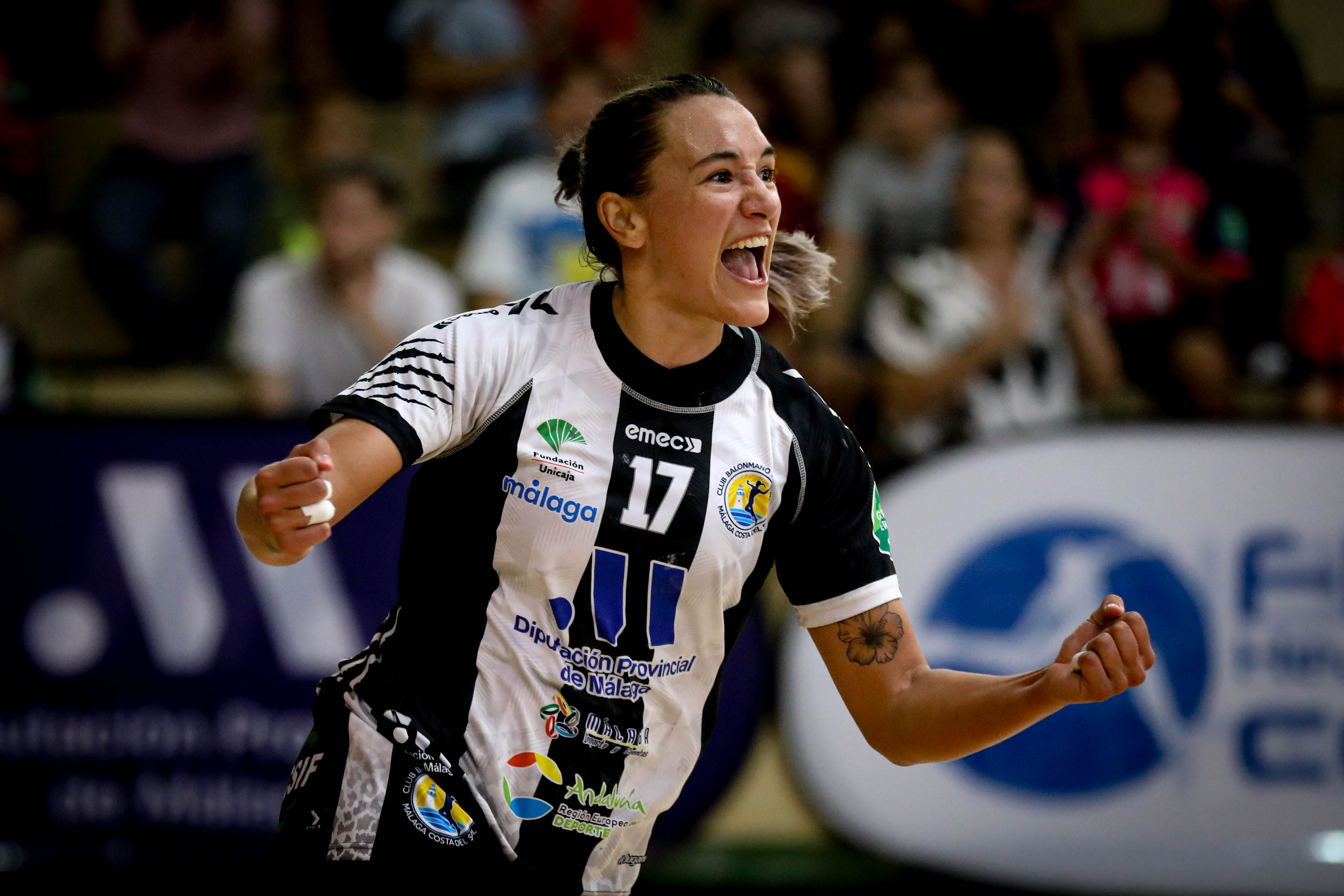

Personal information
- Born: 6 August 1994 (age 32) Buenos Aires, Argentina
- Height: 1.70 m (5 ft 7 in)

Sport
- Sport: Handball
- Position: Pivot
- Current club: CBF Málaga Costa del Sol
- Number: 17

Senior clubs
- Years: Team
- 2013–2017: Estudiantes
- 2017–2018: BM La Calzada
- 2018–: CBF Málaga Costa del Sol
National team
Years	Team	Apps	(Gls)
–	Argentina	215	(210)
Medal record
Pan American Games
Silver medal – second place	2015 Toronto	Team
Silver medal – second place	2019 Lima	Team
Silver medal – second place	2023 Santiago	Team
Pan American Championship
Silver medal – second place	2017 Argentina
Bronze medal – third place	2015 Cuba
South and Central American Championship
Silver medal – second place	2021 Paraguay
Silver medal – second place	2022 Argentina
South American Games
Silver medal – second place	2018 Cochabamba	Team
- Updated on 2 November 2025

Rocío Campigli (born 6 August 1994) is an Argentine handball player for Club Balonmano Femenino Málaga Costa del Sol and the Argentina women's national handball team. She is a former player of Estudiantes

She defended at the 2015 World Women's Handball Championship in Denmark.

== Individual awards and achievements ==
She defended Argentina at the 2016 Summer Olympics. Her nicknames are "La Roca " and "La negra " and her favourite relative is her cousin, Gonzalo Campigli, as he has taught her many things about sport and training.

=== Best pivot ===
- 2016 Pan American Women's Club Handball Championship
