= Kamila Rolon =

Paraguayan handball player (born 1994)

Personal information
- Full name: Kamila Araceli Rolon Ledesma
- Nationality: Paraguayan
- Born: 5 June 1994 (age 32)
- Height: 1.69 m (5 ft 7 in)

Sport
- Sport: Handball
- Position: Right wing
- Current club: San José Handball
National team
Years	Team	Apps	(Gls)
–	Paraguay	150	(60)
Medal record
Pan American Games
Bronze medal – third place	2023 Santiago	Team
Pan American Championship
Bronze medal – third place	2017 Argentina
South and Central American Championship
Bronze medal – third place	2018 Brazil
Bronze medal – third place	2021 Paraguay
South American Games
Silver medal – second place	2022 Asunción	Team
Bolivarian Games
Gold medal – first place	2013 Trujillo	Team
Gold medal – first place	2017 Santa Marta	Team
Gold medal – first place	2022 Valledupar	Team

Kamila Araceli Rolon Ledesma (born 5 June 1994) is a Paraguayan handball player for San José Handball and the Paraguay national team.

She represented Paraguay at the 2013 World Women's Handball Championship in Serbia, where the Paraguayan team placed 21st.
