= Leila Niño =

Argentine handball player

Personal information
- Nationality: Argentine
- Born: 23 October 1991 (age 34)
- Height: 1.69 m (5 ft 7 in)

Sport
- Sport: Handball
- Position: Goalkeeper
- Current club: Municipalidad de Vicente López
National team
| Years | Team | Apps | (Gls) |
| – | Argentina | 29 | (2) |
Medal record
South and Central American Championship
| Silver medal – second place | 2021 Paraguay |
South American Games
| Bronze medal – third place | 2022 Asunción | Team |

Leila Niño (born 23 October 1992) is an Argentine handball player for Municipalidad de Vicente López and the Argentine national team.

She represented Argentina at the 2019 World Women's Handball Championship.
