= Sofía Villalba =

Paraguayan handball player (born 2003)

Personal information
- Full name: Sofía Arami Villalba Méndez
- Nationality: Paraguayan
- Born: 3 January 2003 (age 23)
- Height: 1.74 m (5 ft 9 in)

Sport
- Sport: Handball
- Position: Right wing
- Current club: Cerro Porteño
National team
Years	Team	Apps	(Gls)
–	Paraguay	20	(30)
Medal record
South and Central American Championship
Bronze medal – third place	2021 Paraguay
South American Games
Silver medal – second place	2022 Asunción	Team
Bolivarian Games
Gold medal – first place	2022 Valledupar	Team
Junior Pan American Games
Silver medal – second place	2021 Cali	Team

Sofía Arami Villalba Méndez (born 3 January 2003) is a Paraguayan handball player for Cerro Porteño and the Paraguay national team.

She was selected to represent Paraguay at the 2021 World Women's Handball Championship.
