= Karina dos Santos =

Paraguayan handball player (born 1985)

Personal information
- Nationality: Paraguayan
- Born: 1 April 1985 (age 41)
- Height: 1.80 m (5 ft 11 in)

Sport
- Sport: Handball
- Position: Pivot
- Current club: San José Handball
National team
Years	Team	Apps	(Gls)
–	Paraguay	162	(77)
Medal record
Pan American Games
Bronze medal – third place	2023 Santiago	Team
Pan American Championship
Bronze medal – third place	2017 Argentina
South and Central American Championship
Bronze medal – third place	2018 Brazil
Bronze medal – third place	2021 Paraguay
South American Games
Silver medal – second place	2022 Asunción	Team
Bolivarian Games
Gold medal – first place	2017 Santa Marta	Team
Gold medal – first place	2022 Valledupar	Team
Central American Championship
Gold medal – first place	2023 Guatemala
- Updated on 6 November 2023

Karina dos Santos (born 1 April 1985) is a Paraguayan handball player for San José Handball and the Paraguay national team.

She was selected to represent Paraguay at the 2017 World Women's Handball Championship.
