= Jazmín Mendoza =

Paraguayan handball player (born 2002)

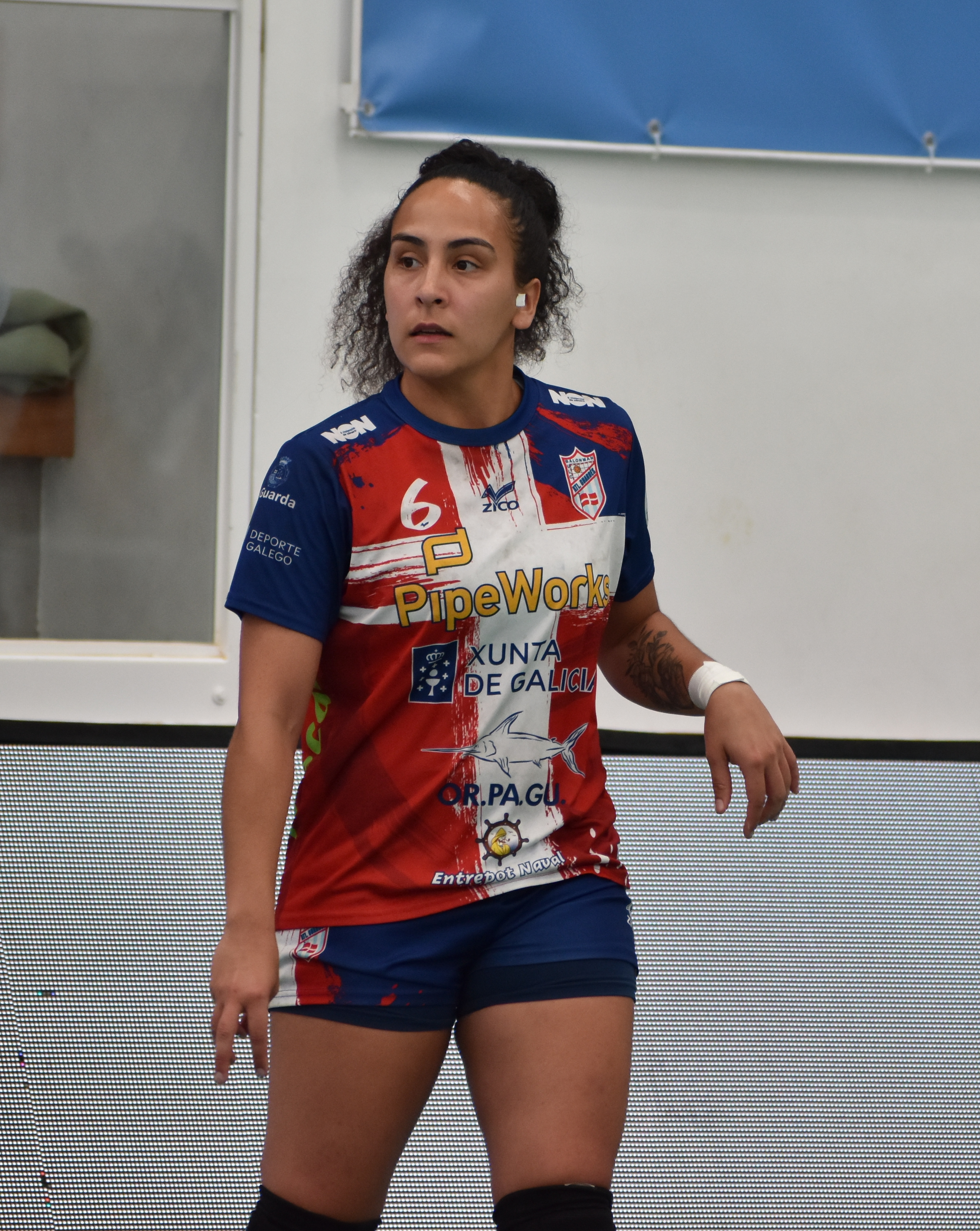

Personal information
- Full name: Jazmín Lucero Mendoza
- Nationality: Paraguayan
- Born: 27 May 2002 (age 24)
- Height: 1.64 m (5 ft 5 in)

Sport
- Sport: Handball
- Position: Right wing
- Current club: CB Atlético Guardés

Senior clubs
- Years: Team
- –: Cerro Porteño
- –: CB Atlético Guardés
National team
Years	Team	Apps	(Gls)
–	Paraguay	60	(95)
Medal record
Pan American Games
Bronze medal – third place	2023 Santiago	Team
South and Central American Championship
Bronze medal – third place	2018 Brazil
Bronze medal – third place	2021 Paraguay
South American Games
Silver medal – second place	2022 Asunción	Team
Silver medal – second place	2026 Santa Fe	Team
Central American Championship
Gold medal – first place	2023 Guatemala
Junior Pan American Games
Silver medal – second place	2021 Cali	Team
- Updated on 27 November 2025

Jazmín Lucero Mendoza (born 27 May 2002) is a Paraguayan handball player for the Spanish club CB Atlético Guardés and the Paraguay national team.

She was selected to represent Paraguay at the 2021 World Women's Handball Championship.
