= Jéssica Quintino =

Brazilian handball player (born 1991)

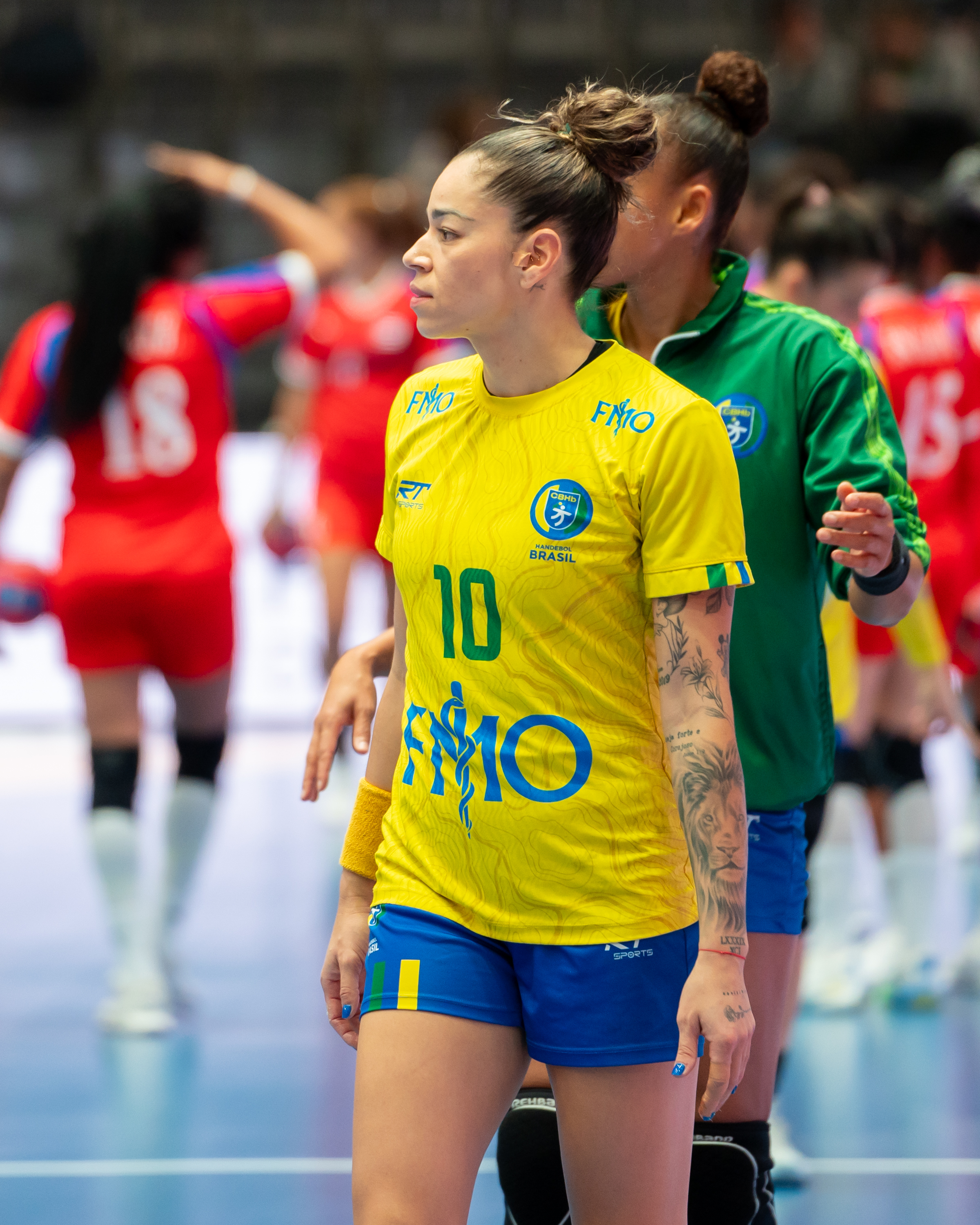

Personal information
- Full name: Jéssica Da Silva Quintino
- Born: 17 April 1991 (age 35) São Paulo, Brazil
- Height: 1.72 m (5 ft 8 in)

Sport
- Sport: Handball
- Position: Right wing
- Current club: Minaur Baia Mare
- Number: 10

Senior clubs
- Years: Team
- 2012–2013: AD Blumenau
- 2013–2014: GTPR Gdynia
- 2014–2016: MKS Lublin
- 2016–2021: Odense Håndbold
- 2021–2024: HC Dunărea Brăila
- 2024–: Minaur Baia Mare
National team
Years	Team	Apps	(Gls)
–	Brazil	109	(273)
Medal record
Pan American Games
Gold medal – first place	2011 Guadalajara	Team
Gold medal – first place	2015 Toronto	Team
Pan American Championship
Gold medal – first place	2011 Brazil
Gold medal – first place	2013 Dominican Republic
Gold medal – first place	2015 Cuba
Gold medal – first place	2017 Argentina
South and Central American Championship
Gold medal – first place	2021 Paraguay
Gold medal – first place	2024 Brazil
South American Games
Gold medal – first place	2018 Cochabamba	Team

Jéssica Da Silva Quintino (born 17 April 1991, São Paulo) is a Brazilian handball player for Minaur Baia Mare and the Brazilian national team.

She participated at the 2011 World Women's Handball Championship in Brazil. She participated at the 2012 Summer Olympics in London, where the Brazilian team placed sixth, and the 2016 Summer Olympics, where the Brazilian team were fifth.

== Achievements ==
=== National team ===
- Pan American Games:
  - Winner: 2011, 2015
- Pan American Championship:
  - Winner: 2011, 2013, 2015, 2017

=== Domestic competitions ===
- Danish Championship:
  - Winner: 2021
  - Silver Medalist: 2018, 2020
  - Bronze Medalist: 2019
- Danish Cup:
  - Winner: 2020
  - Finalist: 2018, 2019

== Awards and recognition ==
- All-Star Right Wing of the Pan American Championship: 2017
- All-Star Right Wimg of the 2021 South and Central American Women's Handball Championship
