= Marisol Carratú =

Argentine handball player

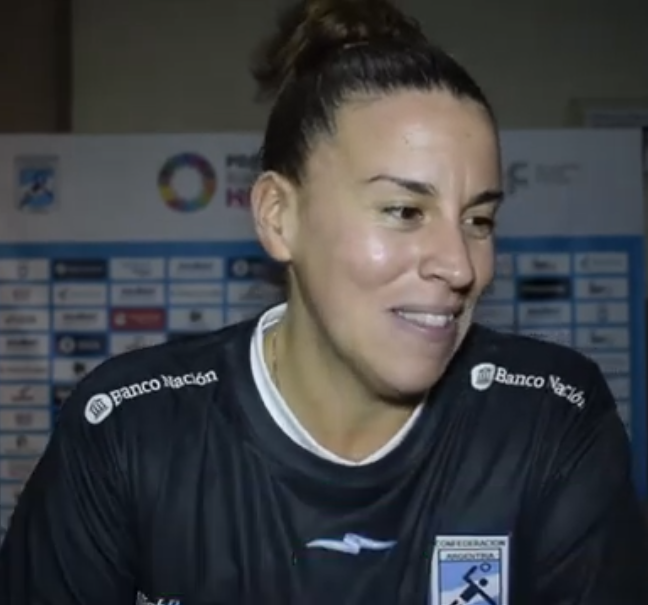
- In a 2017 interview

Personal information
- Full name: Marisol Carratú Santoro
- Born: 15 July 1986 (age 40) Buenos Aires, Argentina
- Height: 1.76 m (5 ft 9 in)

Sport
- Sport: Handball
- Position: Goalkeeper
- Current club: CB Atlético Guardés
- Number: 44

Senior clubs
- Years: Team
- 2008–2011: Feve Gijón
- 2011–2016: Club Ferro Carril Oeste
- 2016–2018: CB Atlético Guardés
- 2018–2019: Entente Noisy le Grand/Gagny
- 2019–: CB Atlético Guardés
National team
Years	Team	Apps	(Gls)
–	Argentina	153	(3)
Medal record
Pan American Games
Silver medal – second place	2015 Toronto	Team
Silver medal – second place	2019 Lima	Team
Silver medal – second place	2023 Santiago	Team
Pan American Championship
Silver medal – second place	2017 Argentina
Bronze medal – third place	2015 Cuba
South and Central American Championship
Silver medal – second place	2018 Brazil
Silver medal – second place	2021 Paraguay
Silver medal – second place	2022 Argentina
Silver medal – second place	2024 Brazil
South American Games
Silver medal – second place	2018 Cochabamba	Team
- Updated on 2 November 2025

Marisol Carratú Santoro (born 15 July 1986) is an Argentine handball goalkeeper for CB Atlético Guardés and the Argentina women's national handball team.

She defended Argentina at the 2013 World Women's Handball Championship in Serbia and at the 2015 World Women's Handball Championship in Denmark.

== Achievements ==
- Argentinean Clubs Championship: 2015
