= Gabriela Moreschi =

Brazilian handball player (born 1994)

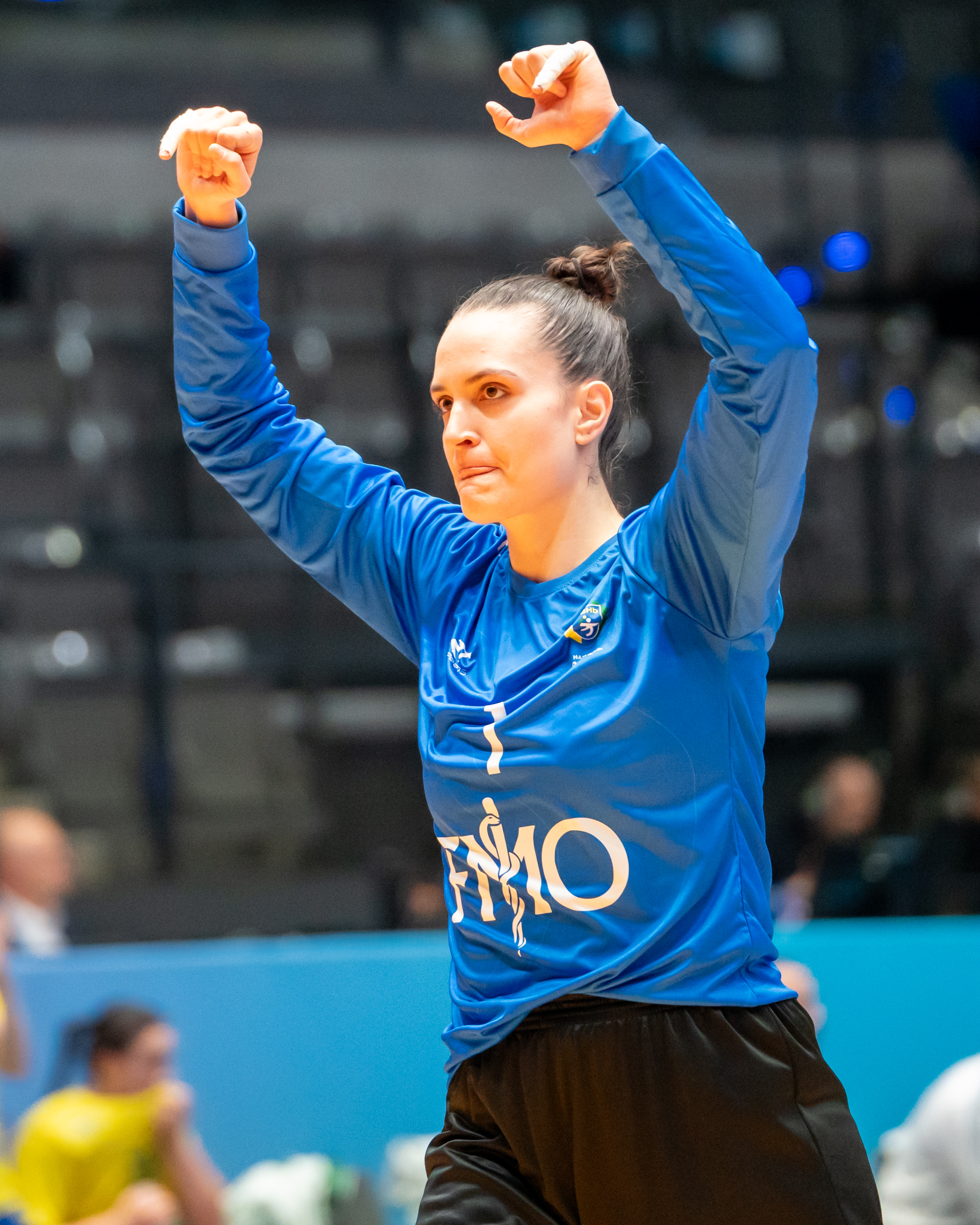

Personal information
- Full name: Gabriela Gonçalves Dias Moreschi
- Born: 8 July 1994 (age 32) Maringá, Brazil
- Height: 1.90 m (6 ft 3 in)

Sport
- Sport: Handball
- Position: Goalkeeper
- Current club: Metz Handball
- Number: 1

Senior clubs
- Years: Team
- –2015: Jundiaí HC
- 2015–2016: Flint Tønsberg
- 2016–2018: Larvik HK
- 2018–2019: Măgura Cisnădie
- 2019–2021: Fleury Loiret HB
- 2021–2024: SG BBM Bietigheim
- 2024–2026: CSM București
- 2026–: Metz Handball
National team
Years	Team	Apps	(Gls)
–	Brazil	102	(0)
Medal record
Pan American Games
Gold medal – first place	2023 Santiago	Team
South and Central American Championship
Gold medal – first place	2018 Brazil
Gold medal – first place	2021 Paraguay
Gold medal – first place	2022 Argentina
Gold medal – first place	2024 Brazil
South American Games
Gold medal – first place	2018 Cochabamba	Team
- Updated on July 2024

Gabriela Gonçalves Dias Moreschi (born 8 July 1994) is a Brazilian handballer for Metz Handball and the Brazilian national team.

== Achievements ==
- Norwegian League:
  - Winner: 2017
  - Silver Medalist: 2018
- Norwegian Cup:
  - Winner: 2016, 2017
- South American Games:
  - Gold Medalist: 2018
- EHF European League:
  - Winner: 2022
- Bundesliga:
  - Winner: 2022, 2023, 2024
- EHF Champions League:
  - Silver Medalist: 2024
- 2023 Pan American Games: Top goalkeeper
- Romanian National League:
  - Winner: 2024
- Romanian Cup:
  - Winner: 2025
- Romanian Supercup:
  - Winner: 2024, 2025
