= Malena Cavo =

Argentine handball player

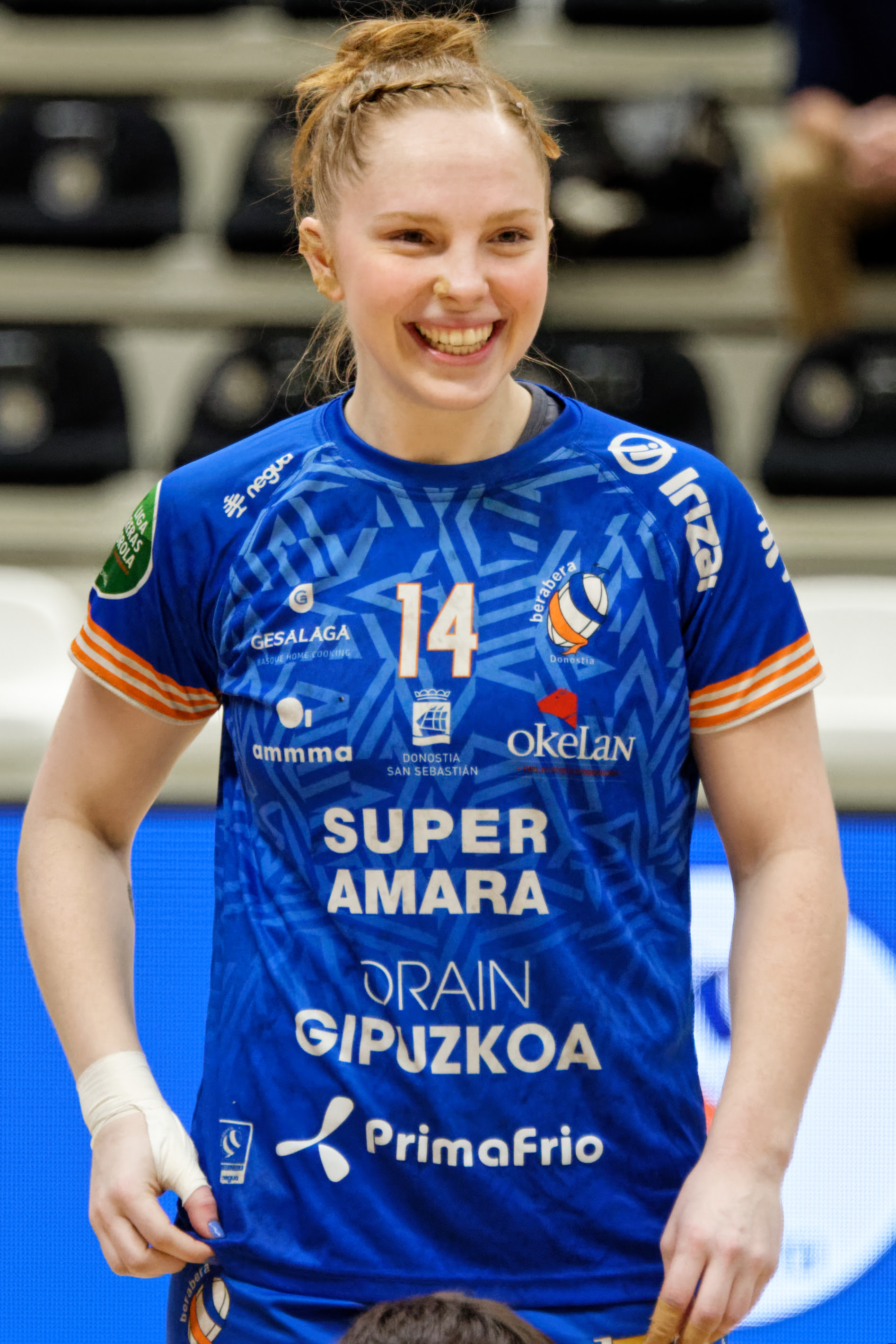
- Malena Calvo in 2021

Personal information
- Nationality: Argentine
- Born: 2 April 1999 (age 27) Buenos Aires, Argentina
- Height: 1.69 m (5 ft 7 in)

Sport
- Sport: Handball
- Position: Right Back
- Current club: MKS Zaglebie Lubin
- Number: 7

Senior clubs
- Years: Team
- –2020: Dorrego Handball
- 2020–2024: Bera Bera Handball
- 2024–: MKS Zaglebie Lubin
National team
Years	Team	Apps	(Gls)
2018–	Argentina	63	(206)
Medal record
Pan American Games
Silver medal – second place	2019 Lima	Team
Silver medal – second place	2023 Santiago	Team
South American Games
Gold medal – first place	2026 Santa Fe	Team
South and Central American Championship
Silver medal – second place	2018 Brazil
Silver medal – second place	2021 Paraguay
Silver medal – second place	2024 Brazil
Pan American Junior Championship
Bronze medal – third place	2016 Chile
- Updated on 2 November 2025

Malena Cavo (born 2 April 1999) is an Argentine handball player for MKS Zaglebie Lubin and the Argentine national team.

== Achievements ==
- 2021 South and Central American Women's Handball Championship: All star team right back
