= Jessica Fleitas =

Paraguayan handball player (born 1997)

Personal information
- Nationality: Paraguayan
- Born: 22 August 1997 (age 29)
- Height: 1.63 m (5 ft 4 in)

Sport
- Sport: Handball
- Position: Left back

Senior clubs
- Years: Team
- –: Cerro Porteño
- –: Club Juventud Ypanense
National team
Years	Team	Apps	(Gls)
–	Paraguay	100	(104)
Medal record
South and Central American Championship
Bronze medal – third place	2021 Paraguay
South American Games
Silver medal – second place	2022 Asunción	Team
Silver medal – second place	2026 Santa Fe	Team
Bolivarian Games
Gold medal – first place	2022 Valledupar	Team
- Updated on 27 November 2025

Jessica Fleitas (born 22 August 1997) is a Paraguayan handball player for Club Juventud Ypanense and the Paraguay national team.

She was selected to represent Paraguay at the 2021 World Women's Handball Championship.
