= Cristian Ramirez =

Cristian Ramirez may refer to:

- Cristian Ramírez (Argentine footballer), Argentine footballer
- Cristian Ramírez (Ecuadorian footballer), Ecuadorian footballer
- Cristián Moll Ramírez, Chilean handball player

== See also ==
- Christian Ramirez (disambiguation)
