= Delyne Leiva =

Paraguayan handball player (born 1998)

Personal information
- Full name: Delyne Esther Leiva Morlas
- Nationality: Paraguayan
- Born: 27 March 1998 (age 28)
- Height: 1.59 m (5 ft 3 in)

Sport
- Sport: Handball
- Position: Centre back
- Current club: Club Cerro Porteño
National team
Years	Team	Apps	(Gls)
–	Paraguay	125	(40)
Medal record
Pan American Games
Bronze medal – third place	2023 Santiago	Team
Pan American Championship
Bronze medal – third place	2017 Argentina
South and Central American Championship
Bronze medal – third place	2018 Brazil
Bronze medal – third place	2021 Paraguay
South American Games
Silver medal – second place	2022 Asunción	Team
Silver medal – second place	2026 Santa Fe	Team
Bolivarian Games
Gold medal – first place	2017 Santa Marta	Team
Gold medal – first place	2022 Valledupar	Team
Central American Championship
Gold medal – first place	2023 Guatemala
Pan American Junior Championship
Bronze medal – third place	2018 Brazil
Pan American Youth Championship
Silver medal – second place	2016 Chile

Delyne Esther Leiva Morlas (born 27 March 1998) is a Paraguayan handball player for Club Cerro Porteño and the Paraguay national team.

She was selected to represent Paraguay at the 2017 World Women's Handball Championship.
