= Víctor Donoso =

Chilean handball player (born 1990)

Personal information
- Full name: Víctor Andrés Donoso Andalaft
- Born: 27 November 1990 (age 35) Santiago, Chile
- Height: 1.90 m (6 ft 3 in)

Sport
- Sport: Handball
- Position: Left back
- Current club: CB Triana

Senior clubs
- Years: Team
- 2008–2012: Universidad de Chile
- 2012–2013: HC Aschersleben
- 2013–2014: CB Maristas Algemesí
- 2014–2015: HK Topoľčany
- 2015–2016: Billère HB
- 2016–2018: Montelimar/Cruas HB
- 2018–2019: Junior Fasano
- 2019–2021: KH Kopřivnice
- 2021–2022: HK Topoľčany
- 2022–: CB Triana
National team
Years	Team	Apps	(Gls)
–	Chile	47	(46)
Medal record
Pan American Games
Silver medal – second place	2019 Lima	Team
Pan American Championship
Silver medal – second place	2016 Argentina
Bronze medal – third place	2018 Greenland
South and Central American Championship
Bronze medal – third place	2022 Brazil
Bronze medal – third place	2024 Argentina
South American Games
Silver medal – second place	2022 Asunción	Team

Víctor Andrés Donoso Andalaft (born 27 November 1990) is a Chilean handball player for CB Triana and the Chilean national team.

He participated at the 2017 World Men's Handball Championship.
