= Benjamín Calleja =

Chilean handball player (born 1990)

Personal information
- Full name: Benjamín Ignacio Calleja Salas
- Nationality: Chilean
- Born: 2 May 1990 (age 36)
- Height: 1.70 m (5 ft 7 in)

Sport
- Sport: Handball
- Position: Left wing

Senior clubs
- Years: Team
- 2007–2015: CB Ovalle
- 2015–2016: CB San José Obrero
- 2006–2017: CH Sant Joan Despí
- 2017–2019: CB Burgos
- 2019–2020: BM Zamora
- 2020: CB Ovalle
- 2020–2022: CAB Cartagena
National team
Years	Team	Apps	(Gls)
–	Chile	10	(14)
Medal record
South and Central American Championship
Bronze medal – third place	2022 Brazil
Bronze medal – third place	2024 Argentina
South American Games
Silver medal – second place	2022 Asunción	Team

Benjamín Ignacio Calleja Salas (born 2 May 1990) is a Chilean handball player for the Chilean national team.
