= Sebastián Ceballos =

Chilean handball player (born 1992)

Personal information
- Full name: Sebastián Ignacio Ceballos Gutiérrez
- Born: 1 July 1992 (age 34) Santiago, Chile
- Height: 1.75 m (5 ft 9 in)

Sport
- Sport: Handball
- Position: Left wing
- Current club: CD Balopal

Senior clubs
- Years: Team
- 2009–2013: Club Winterhill
- 2013–2019: BM Zamora
- 2020–2021: ABC Braga
- 2021–2022: CB Burgos
- 2022–: CD Balopal
National team
Years	Team	Apps	(Gls)
–	Chile	51	(88)
Medal record
Pan American Games
Silver medal – second place	2019 Lima	Team
Bronze medal – third place	2015 Toronto	Team
Bronze medal – third place	2023 Santiago	Team
Pan American Championship
Silver medal – second place	2016 Argentina
Bronze medal – third place	2018 Greenland
South and Central American Championship
Bronze medal – third place	2022 Brazil
South American Games
Silver medal – second place	2022 Asunción	Team
Bronze medal – third place	2018 Cochabamba	Team

Sebastián Ignacio Ceballos Gutiérrez (born 1 July 1992) is a Chilean handball player for CD Balopal and the Chilean national team.
