= 2025 South and Central American Handball Last Chance Qualification Tournament =

Tournament details
- Host country: Colombia
- Venue: 1 (in 1 host city)
- Dates: 24–26 April
- Teams: 3 (from 1 confederation)

Final positions
- Champions: Paraguay
- Runners-up: Colombia
- Third place: Peru

Tournament statistics
- Matches played: 3
- Goals scored: 169 (56.33 per match)

‌The 2025 South and Central American Handball Last Chance Qualification Tournament was held from 24 to 26 April 2025 in Palmira, Colombia under the aegis of South and Central America Handball Confederation. The championship decided the last spot for the 2025 World Women's Handball Championship from the region, with the top team from the championship qualifying for the event.

Paraguay won the tournament and reached the world championship by winning in both games to top the group.

== Teams ==
Three teams participated. Originally, Chile were going to participate but before the tournament they withdrew.

- ~~Chile~~
- Colombia (hosts)
- Paraguay
- Peru

== Venue ==
The venue is the IMDER Palmira Sports Center in Palmira, Colombia.

== Group ==
=== Standings ===
Pos	Team	Pld	W	D	L	GF	GA	GD	Pts	Qualification
1	Paraguay	2	2	0	0	74	34	+40	4	2025 World Women's Handball Championship
2	Colombia (H)	2	1	0	1	61	45	+16	2	
3	Peru	2	0	0	2	34	90	−56	0	

Rules for classification: 1) points; 2) head-to-head points; 3) head-to-head goal difference; 4) head-to-head number of goals scored; 5) goal difference.
(H) Hosts

24 April 2025; 18:00	Colombia	41–20	Peru	IMDER Palmira Sports Center, Palmira
24 April 2025; 18:00		(21–10)		IMDER Palmira Sports Center, Palmira

25 April 2025; 18:00	Peru	14–49	Paraguay	IMDER Palmira Sports Center, Palmira
25 April 2025; 18:00		(5–26)	Velázquez 13	IMDER Palmira Sports Center, Palmira
25 April 2025; 18:00		Report		IMDER Palmira Sports Center, Palmira

26 April 2025; 18:00	Paraguay	25–20	Colombia	IMDER Palmira Sports Center, Palmira
26 April 2025; 18:00	Samaniego 7	(12–8)		IMDER Palmira Sports Center, Palmira
26 April 2025; 18:00		Report		IMDER Palmira Sports Center, Palmira

== Match links ==
- Colombia vs Peru Part 1
- Colombia vs Peru Part 2
- Peru vs Paraguay
- Paraguay vs Colombia
