= Cristián Moll Ramírez =

Chilean handball player (born 1993)

Personal information
- Full name: Cristián Esteban Moll Ramírez
- Born: 13 March 1993 (age 33) Quilpué, Chile
- Height: 1.85 m (6 ft 1 in)

Sport
- Sport: Handball
- Position: Centre back
- Current club: Eón Alicante

Senior clubs
- Years: Team
- 2009–2010: Santiago Wanderers
- 2010–2011: BM Dominicos
- 2011–2013: Santiago Wanderers
- 2013–2015: Pedro Alonso Niño
- 2015–2016: BM Los Dólmenes
- 2016–2017: CH Sant Joan Despí
- 2017–2018: Agustinos Alicante
- 2018–2020: CH Sant Joan Despí
- 2020–: Eón Alicante
National team
Years	Team	Apps	(Gls)
–	Chile	35	(48)
Medal record
Pan American Games
Bronze medal – third place	2015 Toronto	Team
Bronze medal – third place	2023 Santiago	Team
Pan American Championship
Silver medal – second place	2016 Argentina
Bronze medal – third place	2018 Greenland
South American Games
Bronze medal – third place	2018 Cochabamba	Team

Cristián Esteban Moll Ramírez (born 13 March 1993) is a Chilean handball player for Eón Alicante and the Chilean national team.
