= Javier Frelijj =

Chilean handball player (born 1991)

Personal information
- Born: 28 January 1991 (age 35) Valparaíso, Chile
- Height: 1.90 m (6 ft 3 in)

Sport
- Sport: Handball
- Position: Pivot
- Current club: CB Ovalle
- Number: 6

Senior clubs
- Years: Team
- 2011–2015: CD Luterano
- 2015–2018: Inter BM
- 2019: CD Luterano
- 2019–2020: CB San José Obrero
- 2020–2021: CD Luterano
- 2021–2022: Córdoba BM
- 2022–: CB Ovalle
National team
Years	Team	Apps	(Gls)
–	Chile	47	(58)
Medal record
Pan American Games
Silver medal – second place	2019 Lima	Team
Bronze medal – third place	2015 Toronto	Team
Pan American Championship
Silver medal – second place	2016 Argentina
Bronze medal – third place	2018 Greenland
South and Central American Championship
Bronze medal – third place	2022 Brazil
Bronze medal – third place	2026 Paraguay
South American Games
Silver medal – second place	2022 Asunción	Team
Bolivarian Games
Gold medal – first place	2017 Santa Marta	Team
Gold medal – first place	2022 Valledupar	Team

Javier Andrés Frelijj Vásquez (born 28 January 1991) is a Chilean handball player for CB Ovalle and the Chile national team.

== Individual achievements ==
- 2019 South and Central American Men's Club Handball Championship: Top scorer
