= Handball at the 2028 Summer Olympics – Women's qualification =

The women's qualification for the Olympic handball tournament will occur between January 2028 and April 2028, assigning quota places to the twelve squads for the Games: the hosts, the world champion, four continental champions (Africa, Europe, Asia and Oceania, and the Americas), and six teams from the IHF World Olympic qualifying tournaments, respectively.

== Summary ==
Qualification	Date	Host	Vacancies	Qualified
Host nation	—N/a	—N/a	1	United States
2026 European Championships	3–20 December 2026	Poland; Czech Republic; Romania; Slovakia; Turkey	1	
2027 Pan American Games	16 July– 1 August 2027	(Peru) Lima	1	
2027 Asian Qualification Tournament	27 September – 6 October 2027	Japan	1	
2027 World Championships	1–19 December 2027	Hungary	1	
2027 African Championships	2027	Angola	1	
2028 IHF Women's Olympic Qualification Tournaments	28 February – 5 March 2028	TBA	2	
2028 IHF Women's Olympic Qualification Tournaments	28 February – 5 March 2028	TBA	2	
2028 IHF Women's Olympic Qualification Tournaments	28 February – 5 March 2028	TBA	2	
Total			12	
