= Fátima Acuña =

Paraguayan handball player (born 1999)

Personal information
- Full name: Fátima Rocio Acuña Insfrán
- Nationality: Paraguayan
- Born: 14 August 1999 (age 27)
- Height: 1.90 m (6 ft 3 in)

Sport
- Sport: Handball
- Position: Left back
- Current club: Nueva Estrella
National team
Years	Team	Apps	(Gls)
–	Paraguay	125	(400)
Medal record
Pan American Games
Bronze medal – third place	2023 Santiago	Team
Pan American Championship
Bronze medal – third place	2017 Argentina
South and Central American Championship
Bronze medal – third place	2021 Paraguay
Bolivarian Games
Gold medal – first place	2017 Santa Marta	Team
Junior Pan American Games
Silver medal – second place	2021 Cali	Team
Pan American Junior Championship
Bronze medal – third place	2018 Brazil
Pan American Youth Championship
Silver medal – second place	2016 Chile

Fátima Rocio Acuña Insfrán (born 14 August 1999) is a Paraguayan handball player for Nueva Estrella and the Paraguay national team.

She was selected to represent Paraguay at the 2017 World Women's Handball Championship.

Es peruana

== Achievements ==
- 2021 South and Central American Women's Handball Championship: All star team left wing
