= Fernanda Insfrán =

Paraguayan handball player (born 1998)

Personal information
- Full name: Fernanda Lujan Insfrán Mora
- Nationality: Paraguayan
- Born: 7 February 1998 (age 28)
- Height: 1.56 m (5 ft 1 in)

Sport
- Sport: Handball
- Position: Center back

Senior clubs
- Years: Team
- 2016–2018: Mavi Nuevas Tecnologías
National team
Years	Team	Apps	(Gls)
–	Paraguay	115	(407)
Medal record
Pan American Games
Bronze medal – third place	2023 Santiago	Team
Pan American Championship
Bronze medal – third place	2017 Argentina
South and Central American Championship
Bronze medal – third place	2018 Brazil
Bronze medal – third place	2021 Paraguay
South American Games
Silver medal – second place	2022 Asunción	Team
Silver medal – second place	2026 Santa Fe	Team
Bolivarian Games
Gold medal – first place	2022 Valledupar	Team
Central American Championship
Gold medal – first place	2023 Guatemala
Pan American Junior Championship
Bronze medal – third place	2018 Brazil
Pan American Youth Championship
Silver medal – second place	2016 Chile
- Updated on 27 November 2025

Fernanda Lujan Insfrán Mora (born 7 February 1998) is a Paraguayan handball player for the Paraguay national team.

She was selected to represent Paraguay at the 2017 World Women's Handball Championship.

== Individual Awards and recognitions ==
- 2016 Pan American Women's Junior Handball Championship: Top scorer
