= Handball at the 2028 Summer Olympics – Men's qualification =

The men's qualification for the Olympic handball tournament will occur between January 2028 and April 2028, assigning quota places to the twelve squads for the Games: the hosts, the world champion, four continental champions (Africa, Europe, Asia and Oceania, and the Americas), and six teams from the IHF World Olympic qualifying tournaments, respectively.

== Summary ==
| Qualification | Date | Host | Vacancies | Qualified |
|---|---|---|---|---|
| Host nation | —N/a | —N/a | 1 | United States |
| 2027 World Championships | 13–31 January 2027 | Germany | 1 | |
| 2027 Pan American Games | 16 July – 1 August 2027 | (Peru) Lima | 1 | |
| 2027 Asian Qualification Tournament | 3–12 May 2027 | | 1 | |
| 2028 European Championships | 13–30 January 2028 | Spain; Portugal; Switzerland | 1 | |
| 2028 African Championships | January 2028 | Egypt | 1 | |
| 2028 IHF Men's Olympic Qualification Tournaments | 3–9 April 2028 | TBA | 2 | |
| 2028 IHF Men's Olympic Qualification Tournaments | 3–9 April 2028 | TBA | 2 | |
| 2028 IHF Men's Olympic Qualification Tournaments | 3–9 April 2028 | TBA | 2 | |
| Total | | | 12 | |
