= Felipe García (handballer) =

Chilean handball player (born 1993)

Personal information
- Nationality: Chilean
- Born: 26 October 1993 (age 32) Santiago, Chile
- Height: 1.88 m (6 ft 2 in)

Sport
- Sport: Handball
- Position: Goalkeeper
- Current club: CB Burgos

Senior clubs
- Years: Team
- 2011–2015: Santiago Steels
- 2015–2016: Zağnos EH
- 2016–2018: MYK Hentbol SK
- 2018–2022: Club Italiano
- 2022–: CB Burgos
National team
Years	Team	Apps	(Gls)
–	Chile	35	(2)
Medal record
Pan American Games
Silver medal – second place	2019 Lima	Team
Bronze medal – third place	2023 Santiago	Team
Pan American Championship
Silver medal – second place	2016 Argentina
Bronze medal – third place	2018 Greenland
South and Central American Championship
Bronze medal – third place	2022 Brazil
Bronze medal – third place	2024 Argentina
Bronze medal – third place	2026 Paraguay
South American Games
Silver medal – second place	2022 Asunción	Team
Bronze medal – third place	2018 Cochabamba	Team
Bolivarian Games
Gold medal – first place	2022 Valledupar	Team

Felipe Ignacio García Fuentes (born 26 October 1993) is a Chilean handball player for CB Burgos and the Chilean national team.

== Career ==
In 2017, he played for Myk Hentbol in Turkey. He participated at the 2017 World Men's Handball Championship, as part of Chile's national team.

In 2019, he played for Italiano BM. He participated in the 2019 World Men's Handball Championship, as part of Chile's national team.
