= Sebastián Pavez =

Chilean handball player (born 1996)

Personal information
- Full name: Sebastián Enrique Pavez Montecinos
- Born: 30 August 1996 (age 30) Concepción, Chile
- Height: 1.82 m (6 ft 0 in)

Sport
- Sport: Handball
- Position: Right wing

Senior clubs
- Years: Team
- 2014–2017: Vieux Gaulois
- 2017–2020: USAB
- 2020–2022: Sporting Horta - DPV Kutral
National team
Years	Team	Apps	(Gls)
–	Chile	11	(18)
Medal record
Pan American Games
Silver medal – second place	2019 Lima	Team
South and Central American Championship
Bronze medal – third place	2022 Brazil
Bronze medal – third place	2024 Argentina
South American Games
Silver medal – second place	2022 Asunción	Team
Bronze medal – third place	2018 Cochabamba	Team
Bolivarian Games
Gold medal – first place	2017 Santa Marta	Team
Gold medal – first place	2022 Valledupar	Team
Pan American Junior Championship
Bronze medal – third place	2017 Paraguay
Pan American Youth Championship
Bronze medal – third place	2015 Venezuela

Sebastián Enrique Pavez Montecinos (born 30 August 1996) is a Chilean handball player for the Chilean national team.

He represented Chile at the 2019 World Men's Handball Championship.
