= Handball at the 2022 Bolivarian Games =

Tournament details
- Host country: Colombia
- Venue: 1 (in 1 host city)
- Dates: 25 June – 4 July
- Teams: 12 (from 2 confederations)

Handball competition of the 2022 Bolivarian Games was held from 25 June to 4 July at the Concha Acústica, Chía, Cundinamarca Department.

== Participating teams ==
Men

- Chile
- Colombia
- Peru
- Dominican Republic
- Venezuela

Women

- Bolivia
- Chile
- Colombia
- Paraguay
- Peru
- Dominican Republic
- Venezuela

== Medalists ==
| Event | Gold | Silver | Bronze |
|---|---|---|---|
| Men's tournament | Chile; Aaron Codina; Arian Jesús Delgado; Benjamín Rodrigo Illesca; Diego Antonio Perez; Diego Felipe Arancibia; Erwin Feuchtmann; Felipe García; Javier Frelijj; Luciano Hugo Scaramelli; Luciano Nicolás Flores; Nicolás Alejandro Moraga; Rodrigo Abraham Aedo; Sebastián Pavez; Vicente Antonio González | Venezuela; Albert Manuel Goitia; Carlos Carrasquero Quero; Carlos Manuel Cañate; Dairon Jose Lopez; Edgar Arturo Soto; Helson Noel Noel; Ivan Josue Perez; Jesus Antonio Partida; Jesus David Macayo; Jhonny Alberto Peñaloza; Juan Jose Villalobos; Noel Ednelson Mervil; Rainner Jose Seijas; Ronal Antonio Timaure | Colombia; Cristian Camilo Pineda; Cristian Esteban Cardona; Daniel Esteban Gonzalez; Daniel Fernando Salazar; David Mauricio García; Dilan Belcazar Moreno; Glonan Melgarejo Ruiz; Jose David Florez; Juan Jose Delgado; Juan Manuel Gomez; Julian Alberto Villa; Santiago Lopez Velez; Sebastian Restrepo Lamirault; William Romero Diaz |
| Women's tournament | Paraguay; Ada Miskinich; Camila Nazareth Fescchenko; Delyne Leiva; Fernanda Insfrán; Gisela González; Jessica Fleitas; Julieta Chilavert; Kamila Rolon; Karina dos Santos; Alicia Villalba; Maria Cristina Machuca; María Paula Fernández; Shelsea Careaga; Sofía Villalba | Chile; Alicia Ignacia Torres; Antonella Valentina Piantini; Catalina Castro Rojas; Catalina Francisca Moreno; Claudia Ester Álvarez; Gabriela Belén Muller; Josefa Ignacia Araya; Marcela Fernanda San Martín; María Elena Correa; Maura Andrea Álvarez; Pía Victoria Pacheco; Romina Antonia Ramírez; Sofía Alejandra Alarcón; Valeska Andrea Lovera | Dominican Republic; Annerys Cabrera Morillo; Carina Lorenzo; Carolina López; Crisleydi Hernández; Diandra Paola Pie; Florquidia Puello; Johanna Pimentel; Mabelin Mariolis Wattley; María Dania Novas; Mariela Andino; Nancy Peña; Olkidia Diolenny Cuevas; Suleidy Suárez; Yeimy Alejandrina Novas |

== Men's tournament ==
| Pos | Team | Pld | W | D | L | GF | GA | GD | Pts |
|---|---|---|---|---|---|---|---|---|---|
| 1st place, gold medalist(s) | Chile | 4 | 4 | 0 | 0 | 143 | 81 | +62 | 8 |
| 2nd place, silver medalist(s) | Venezuela | 4 | 2 | 0 | 2 | 126 | 139 | −13 | 4 (Note: Venezuela 2 Pts, +3 GD; Colombia 2 Pts, 0 GD; Dominican Republic 2 Pts, –3 GD) |
| 3rd place, bronze medalist(s) | Colombia (H) | 4 | 2 | 0 | 2 | 124 | 130 | −6 | 4 |
| 4 | Dominican Republic | 4 | 2 | 0 | 2 | 114 | 123 | −9 | 4 |
| 5 | Peru | 4 | 0 | 0 | 4 | 107 | 141 | −34 | 0 |

Source: Valledupar 2022
Rules for classification: 1) points; 2) head-to-head points; 3) head-to-head goal difference; 4) head-to-head number of goals scored; 5) goal difference.
(H) Hosts
Notes:

All times are local (UTC−5).

| 30 June 2022; 16:00 | Dominican Republic | 35–34 | Venezuela | Concha Acústica, Chía; Attendance: 150; Referees: Estrada, Pineda (COL) |
| 30 June 2022; 16:00 | Obijo 10 | (18–19) | Peñaloza, Pérez 7 | Concha Acústica, Chía; Attendance: 150; Referees: Estrada, Pineda (COL) |
| 30 June 2022; 16:00 | 1× (suspension) | Report | 4× (suspension) | Concha Acústica, Chía; Attendance: 150; Referees: Estrada, Pineda (COL) |

| 30 June 2022; 18:30 | Chile | 39–22 | Peru | Concha Acústica, Chía; Attendance: 200; Referees: Araújo, Germán (URU) |
| 30 June 2022; 18:30 | Feuchtmann 8 | (19–9) | Trelles 5 | Concha Acústica, Chía; Attendance: 200; Referees: Araújo, Germán (URU) |
| 30 June 2022; 18:30 | 2× (yellow card) 4× (suspension) | Report | 3× (suspension) | Concha Acústica, Chía; Attendance: 200; Referees: Araújo, Germán (URU) |

| 1 July 2022; 16:00 | Chile | 30–21 | Dominican Republic | Concha Acústica, Chía; Attendance: 300; Referees: Burgos, Delgado (ARG) |
| 1 July 2022; 16:00 | Feuchtmann 9 | (11–11) | Beras 9 | Concha Acústica, Chía; Attendance: 300; Referees: Burgos, Delgado (ARG) |
| 1 July 2022; 16:00 | 2× (yellow card) 5× (suspension) | Report | 9× (suspension) | Concha Acústica, Chía; Attendance: 300; Referees: Burgos, Delgado (ARG) |

| 1 July 2022; 18:30 | Colombia | 35–25 | Peru | Concha Acústica, Chía; Attendance: 500; Referees: Geraldello, Marquez (BRA) |
| 1 July 2022; 18:30 | Belalcazar 6 | (20–8) | Gutelius 6 | Concha Acústica, Chía; Attendance: 500; Referees: Geraldello, Marquez (BRA) |
| 1 July 2022; 18:30 | 5× (suspension) | Report | 5× (suspension) | Concha Acústica, Chía; Attendance: 500; Referees: Geraldello, Marquez (BRA) |

| 2 July 2022; 16:00 | Dominican Republic | 28–25 | Peru | Concha Acústica, Chía; Attendance: 300; Referees: Estrada, Pineda (COL) |
| 2 July 2022; 16:00 | Beras, Santana 6 | (12–14) | Velez 9 | Concha Acústica, Chía; Attendance: 300; Referees: Estrada, Pineda (COL) |
| 2 July 2022; 16:00 | 5× (suspension) 1× (red card) | Report | 4× (suspension) | Concha Acústica, Chía; Attendance: 300; Referees: Estrada, Pineda (COL) |

| 2 July 2022; 18:30 | Colombia | 33–37 | Venezuela | Concha Acústica, Chía; Attendance: 650; Referees: Araújo, Perdomo (URU) |
| 2 July 2022; 18:30 | Restrepo 7 | (15–15) | Pérez 9 | Concha Acústica, Chía; Attendance: 650; Referees: Araújo, Perdomo (URU) |
| 2 July 2022; 18:30 | 1× (yellow card) 1× (suspension) 1× (red card) | Report | 1× (yellow card) 3× (suspension) | Concha Acústica, Chía; Attendance: 650; Referees: Araújo, Perdomo (URU) |

| 3 July 2022; 16:00 | Venezuela | 16–36 | Chile | Concha Acústica, Chía; Attendance: 150; Referees: Geraldello, Marquez (BRA) |
| 3 July 2022; 16:00 | Peñaloza 7 | (8–16) | Feuchtmann 7 | Concha Acústica, Chía; Attendance: 150; Referees: Geraldello, Marquez (BRA) |
| 3 July 2022; 16:00 | 2× (suspension) 1× (red card) | Report | 1× (yellow card) 4× (suspension) | Concha Acústica, Chía; Attendance: 150; Referees: Geraldello, Marquez (BRA) |

| 3 July 2022; 18:30 | Colombia | 34–30 | Dominican Republic | Concha Acústica, Chía; Attendance: 400; Referees: Burgos, Delgado (ARG) |
| 3 July 2022; 18:30 | Melgarejo 7 | (14–14) | Tejeda 10 | Concha Acústica, Chía; Attendance: 400; Referees: Burgos, Delgado (ARG) |
| 3 July 2022; 18:30 | 1× (red card) | Report | 5× (suspension) 2× (red card) | Concha Acústica, Chía; Attendance: 400; Referees: Burgos, Delgado (ARG) |

| 4 July 2022; 16:00 | Peru | 35–39 | Venezuela | Concha Acústica, Chía; Attendance: 300; Referees: Burgos, Delgado (ARG) |
| 4 July 2022; 16:00 | Gutelius, Velez 10 | (19–17) | Peñaloza 10 | Concha Acústica, Chía; Attendance: 300; Referees: Burgos, Delgado (ARG) |
| 4 July 2022; 16:00 | 4× (suspension) | Report | 3× (suspension) | Concha Acústica, Chía; Attendance: 300; Referees: Burgos, Delgado (ARG) |

| 4 July 2022; 18:30 | Colombia | 22–38 | Chile | Concha Acústica, Chía; Attendance: 1,000; Referees: Araújo, Perdomo (URU) |
| 4 July 2022; 18:30 | Restrepo 7 | (9–20) | Feuchtmann, Moraga 7 | Concha Acústica, Chía; Attendance: 1,000; Referees: Araújo, Perdomo (URU) |
| 4 July 2022; 18:30 | 1× (suspension) | Report | 1× (yellow card) 1× (suspension) | Concha Acústica, Chía; Attendance: 1,000; Referees: Araújo, Perdomo (URU) |

== Women's tournament ==
=== Preliminary round ===
==== Group A ====
| Pos | Team | Pld | W | D | L | GF | GA | GD | Pts | Qualification |
|---|---|---|---|---|---|---|---|---|---|---|
| 1 | Chile | 3 | 3 | 0 | 0 | 112 | 47 | +65 | 6 | Gold medal game |
| 2 | Dominican Republic | 3 | 2 | 0 | 1 | 91 | 84 | +7 | 4 | Bronze medal game |
| 3 | Venezuela | 3 | 1 | 0 | 2 | 77 | 107 | −30 | 2 | Fifth place game |
| 4 | Peru | 3 | 0 | 0 | 3 | 86 | 128 | −42 | 0 | |

Rules for classification: 1) points; 2) head-to-head points; 3) head-to-head goal difference; 4) head-to-head number of goals scored; 5) goal difference.

All times are local (UTC−05:00).

| 25 June 2022; 14:00 | Chile | 29–22 | Dominican Republic | Concha Acústica, Chía; Attendance: 200; Referees: Burgos, Delgado (ARG) |
| 25 June 2022; 14:00 | Ramírez 7 | (10–8) | Andino 5 | Concha Acústica, Chía; Attendance: 200; Referees: Burgos, Delgado (ARG) |
| 25 June 2022; 14:00 | 1× (yellow card) 4× (suspension) | Report | 6× (suspension) 1× (red card) | Concha Acústica, Chía; Attendance: 200; Referees: Burgos, Delgado (ARG) |

| 25 June 2022; 16:30 | Venezuela | 43–40 | Peru | Concha Acústica, Chía; Attendance: 375; Referees: Estrada, Pineda (COL) |
| 25 June 2022; 16:30 | Carvajal 10 | (21–24) | Cruz 17 | Concha Acústica, Chía; Attendance: 375; Referees: Estrada, Pineda (COL) |
| 25 June 2022; 16:30 | 5× (suspension) | Report | 3× (suspension) | Concha Acústica, Chía; Attendance: 375; Referees: Estrada, Pineda (COL) |

| 26 June 2022; 14:00 | Peru | 17–48 | Chile | Concha Acústica, Chía; Attendance: 200; Referees: Estrada, Pineda (COL) |
| 26 June 2022; 14:00 | Delgado 7 | (8–28) | San Martín 7 | Concha Acústica, Chía; Attendance: 200; Referees: Estrada, Pineda (COL) |
| 26 June 2022; 14:00 | 1× (yellow card) 4× (suspension) | Report | 3× (suspension) | Concha Acústica, Chía; Attendance: 200; Referees: Estrada, Pineda (COL) |

| 26 June 2022; 16:30 | Dominican Republic | 32–26 | Venezuela | Concha Acústica, Chía; Attendance: 150; Referees: Araújo, Perdomo (URU) |
| 26 June 2022; 16:30 | Peña 8 | (16–12) | Tovar 6 | Concha Acústica, Chía; Attendance: 150; Referees: Araújo, Perdomo (URU) |
| 26 June 2022; 16:30 | 6× (suspension) 1× (red card) | Report | 5× (suspension) | Concha Acústica, Chía; Attendance: 150; Referees: Araújo, Perdomo (URU) |

| 27 June 2022; 14:00 | Peru | 29–37 | Dominican Republic | Concha Acústica, Chía; Attendance: 150; Referees: Geraldello, Marquez (BRA) |
| 27 June 2022; 14:00 | Delgado 14 | (15–20) | Peña 8 | Concha Acústica, Chía; Attendance: 150; Referees: Geraldello, Marquez (BRA) |
| 27 June 2022; 14:00 | 5× (suspension) | Report | 7× (suspension) | Concha Acústica, Chía; Attendance: 150; Referees: Geraldello, Marquez (BRA) |

| 27 June 2022; 16:30 | Chile | 35–8 | Venezuela | Concha Acústica, Chía; Attendance: 275; Referees: Perdomo, Araújo (URU) |
| 27 June 2022; 16:30 | Muller 7 | (14–6) | three players 2 | Concha Acústica, Chía; Attendance: 275; Referees: Perdomo, Araújo (URU) |
| 27 June 2022; 16:30 | 3× (suspension) | Report | 1× (yellow card) 3× (suspension) 1× (red card) | Concha Acústica, Chía; Attendance: 275; Referees: Perdomo, Araújo (URU) |

==== Group B ====
| Pos | Team | Pld | W | D | L | GF | GA | GD | Pts | Qualification |
|---|---|---|---|---|---|---|---|---|---|---|
| 1 | Paraguay | 2 | 2 | 0 | 0 | 95 | 28 | +67 | 4 | Gold medal game |
| 2 | Colombia (H) | 2 | 1 | 0 | 1 | 58 | 47 | +11 | 2 | Bronze medal game |
| 3 | Bolivia | 2 | 0 | 0 | 2 | 14 | 92 | −78 | 0 | Fifth place game |

Rules for classification: 1) points; 2) head-to-head points; 3) head-to-head goal difference; 4) head-to-head number of goals scored; 5) goal difference.
(H) Hosts

| 25 June 2022; 19:00 | Paraguay | 53–9 | Bolivia | Concha Acústica, Chía; Attendance: 200; Referees: Geraldello, Marquez (BRA) |
| 25 June 2022; 19:00 | Insfrán 9 | (26–2) | Pol 6 | Concha Acústica, Chía; Attendance: 200; Referees: Geraldello, Marquez (BRA) |
| 25 June 2022; 19:00 | 1× (yellow card) 2× (suspension) | Report | 2× (suspension) | Concha Acústica, Chía; Attendance: 200; Referees: Geraldello, Marquez (BRA) |

| 26 June 2022; 19:00 | Colombia | 39–5 | Bolivia | Concha Acústica, Chía; Attendance: 250; Referees: Marquez, Geraldello (BRA) |
| 26 June 2022; 19:00 | Estrada, Rodríguez 7 | (15–1) | Montaño 3 | Concha Acústica, Chía; Attendance: 250; Referees: Marquez, Geraldello (BRA) |
| 26 June 2022; 19:00 | 5× (suspension) | Report | 4× (suspension) | Concha Acústica, Chía; Attendance: 250; Referees: Marquez, Geraldello (BRA) |

| 27 June 2022; 19:00 | Colombia | 19–42 | Paraguay | Concha Acústica, Chía; Attendance: 400; Referees: Burgos, Delgado (ARG) |
| 27 June 2022; 19:00 | Becerra 6 | (8–24) | Villalba 9 | Concha Acústica, Chía; Attendance: 400; Referees: Burgos, Delgado (ARG) |
| 27 June 2022; 19:00 | 2× (suspension) | Report | 1× (yellow card) 5× (suspension) | Concha Acústica, Chía; Attendance: 400; Referees: Burgos, Delgado (ARG) |

=== Final round ===
==== Fifth place game ====
| 28 June 2022; 14:00 | Venezuela | 38–18 | Bolivia | Concha Acústica, Chía; Attendance: 100; Referees: Estrada, Pineda (COL) |
| 28 June 2022; 14:00 | Carvajal 7 | (22–6) | Castillo 5 | Concha Acústica, Chía; Attendance: 100; Referees: Estrada, Pineda (COL) |
| 28 June 2022; 14:00 | 1× (yellow card) 1× (suspension) | Report | 4× (suspension) | Concha Acústica, Chía; Attendance: 100; Referees: Estrada, Pineda (COL) |

==== Bronze medal game ====
| 28 June 2022; 16:30 | Dominican Republic | 31–17 | Colombia | Concha Acústica, Chía; Attendance: 200; Referees: Araújo, Perdomo (URU) |
| 28 June 2022; 16:30 | Peña 10 | (17–10) | Córdoba 4 | Concha Acústica, Chía; Attendance: 200; Referees: Araújo, Perdomo (URU) |
| 28 June 2022; 16:30 | 4× (suspension) 1× (red card) | Report | 3× (suspension) | Concha Acústica, Chía; Attendance: 200; Referees: Araújo, Perdomo (URU) |

==== Gold medal game ====
| 28 June 2022; 19:00 | Chile | 24–25 | Paraguay | Concha Acústica, Chía; Attendance: 600; Referees: Burgos, Delgado (ARG) |
| 28 June 2022; 19:00 | Lovera 7 | (13–10) | Fernández 9 | Concha Acústica, Chía; Attendance: 600; Referees: Burgos, Delgado (ARG) |
| 28 June 2022; 19:00 | 1× (yellow card) 2× (suspension) | Report | 1× (yellow card) 4× (suspension) | Concha Acústica, Chía; Attendance: 600; Referees: Burgos, Delgado (ARG) |

=== Final standings ===
| Rank | Team |
|---|---|
| 1st place, gold medalist(s) | Paraguay |
| 2nd place, silver medalist(s) | Chile |
| 3rd place, bronze medalist(s) | Dominican Republic |
| 4 | Colombia |
| 5 | Venezuela |
| 6 | Bolivia |
| 7 | Peru |

== Also read ==
Handball at the Bolivarian Games
