= Christian Ramirez =

Christian Ramirez may refer to:

- Christian Ramírez (footballer, born 1978), Mexican footballer
- Christian Ramirez (soccer, born 1991), American soccer player

== See also ==
- Cristian Ramirez (disambiguation)
