= Handball at the 2022 South American Games =

- Venue: CEO Centro de Entrenamiento Olímpico
- Location: Asunción, Paraguay
- Dates: 6–15 October
- Nations: 7
- Teams: 5 (men); 6 (women)

Handball competition of the 2022 South American Games in Asunción was held from 6 to 15 October at the CEO Centro de Entrenamiento Olímpico. The top two teams in each tournament qualified to the 2023 Pan American Games.

== Participating teams ==
Men

- Argentina
- Chile
- Paraguay
- Uruguay
- Venezuela

Women

- Argentina
- Bolivia
- Brazil
- Chile
- Paraguay
- Uruguay

== Medal summary ==
=== Medal table ===
* Host nation (Paraguay)

Rank	Nation	Gold	Silver	Bronze	Total
1	Argentina (ARG)	1	0	1	2
2	Brazil (BRA)	1	0	0	1
3	Chile (CHI)	0	1	0	1
3	Paraguay (PAR)*	0	1	0	1
5	Uruguay (URU)	0	0	1	1
Totals (5 entries)		2	2	2	6

=== Medalists ===
Event	Gold	Silver	Bronze
Men's tournament	Argentina; Agustín Forlino; Diego Simonet; Federico Gastón Fernández; Federico Pizarro; Francisco Lombardi; Gonzalo Carro; James Parker; Lautaro Robledo; Leonel Maciel; Lucas Moscariello; Mariano Canepa; Mauricio Basualdo; Nicolás Bonanno; Pablo Simonet; Pedro Martínez Cami; Santiago Baronetto	Chile; Aaron Codina; Arian Delgado; Benjamín Calleja; Benjamín Illesca; Danilo Salgado; Diego Caro; Emil Feuchtmann; Erwin Feuchtmann; Esteban Salinas; Felipe García; Javier Frelijj; Nicolás Moraga; Rodrigo Salinas Muñoz; Sebastián Pavez; Sebastián Ceballos; Víctor Donoso	Uruguay; Alejandro Velazco; Andrés Viera; Bruno Borba; Cristhian Rostagno; Diego Falabrino; Diego Morandeira; Facundo Lima; Federico Rubbo; Gabriel Chaparro; Guillermo Milian; Luis Navarrete; Marcos Mazzilli; Maximiliano De Agrela; Maximo Cancio; Nicolás Fabra; Rodrigo Botejara
Women's tournament	Brazil; Ana Carolina Resende; Ana Clara Carvalho; Ana Cláudia Bolzan; Ana Paula Belo; Bruna Rodrigues; Camila Bonomini; Fernanda Lima; Geandra de Souza; Jéssica Oliveira; Jhennifer dos Santos; Lívia Ventura; Marcela Arounian; Maria Eduarda dos Santos; Milena Menezes; Nicole Damascena; Tainara Gonçalves	Paraguay; Ada Miskinich; Alicia Villalba; Anabel Oviedo; Belinda Bobadilla; Camila Feschenko; Carimy Aluan; Delyne Leiva; Fernanda Insfrán; Jazmín Mendoza; Jessica Fleitas; Julieta Chilavert; Kamila Rolón; Karina dos Santos; Maggie Lugo; María Machuca; Sofía Villalba	Argentina; Antonela Mena; Azul Spinelli; Camila Pedernera; Candelaria Cuadrado; Daniela Vaucher; Delfina Ojea; Florencia Ponce de León; Iara Cáceres; Leila Niño; Lucía Dalle Crode; Maira Carletti; Martina Romero; Sofía Manzano; Sofía Rivadeneira; Valentina Brodsky; Victoria Crivelli

== Men's tournament ==
Pos	Team	Pld	W	D	L	GF	GA	GD	Pts	Qualification
1st place, gold medalist(s)	Argentina	4	4	0	0	151	79	+72	8	2023 Pan American Games
2nd place, silver medalist(s)	Chile	4	3	0	1	138	94	+44	6	2023 Pan American Games as host
3rd place, bronze medalist(s)	Uruguay	4	2	0	2	105	124	−19	4	2023 Pan American Games
4	Paraguay (H)	4	0	1	3	107	155	−48	1 (Note: Venezuela 35–35 Paraguay)	Last chance qualification tournament for the 2023 Pan American Games
5	Venezuela	4	0	1	3	98	147	−49	1	

Source: Asunción 2022
Rules for classification: 1) points; 2) head-to-head points; 3) head-to-head goal difference; 4) head-to-head number of goals scored; 5) goal difference.
(H) Hosts
Notes:

All times are local (UTC–3).

11 October 2022; 14:30	Argentina	43–17	Venezuela	CEO Centro de Entrenamiento Olímpico, Asunción; Attendance: 208; Referees: Sosa, Lemes (URU)
11 October 2022; 14:30	Robledo 9	(22–7)	Araque 4	CEO Centro de Entrenamiento Olímpico, Asunción; Attendance: 208; Referees: Sosa, Lemes (URU)
11 October 2022; 14:30	3× (suspension)	Report	2× (yellow card) 3× (suspension)	CEO Centro de Entrenamiento Olímpico, Asunción; Attendance: 208; Referees: Sosa, Lemes (URU)

11 October 2022; 16:30	Paraguay	29–33	Uruguay	CEO Centro de Entrenamiento Olímpico, Asunción; Attendance: 1,120; Referees: Paolantoni, García (ARG)
11 October 2022; 16:30	Duarte 7	(15–14)	Lima 5	CEO Centro de Entrenamiento Olímpico, Asunción; Attendance: 1,120; Referees: Paolantoni, García (ARG)
11 October 2022; 16:30	3× (yellow card) 4× (suspension)	Report	2× (yellow card) 2× (suspension)	CEO Centro de Entrenamiento Olímpico, Asunción; Attendance: 1,120; Referees: Paolantoni, García (ARG)

12 October 2022; 14:30	Venezuela	19–41	Chile	CEO Centro de Entrenamiento Olímpico, Asunción; Attendance: 550; Referees: Paolantoni, García (ARG)
12 October 2022; 14:30	Noel 5	(10–21)	Pavez, Salgado 5	CEO Centro de Entrenamiento Olímpico, Asunción; Attendance: 550; Referees: Paolantoni, García (ARG)
12 October 2022; 14:30	1× (yellow card) 5× (suspension)	Report	1× (yellow card) 2× (suspension)	CEO Centro de Entrenamiento Olímpico, Asunción; Attendance: 550; Referees: Paolantoni, García (ARG)

12 October 2022; 16:30	Paraguay	21–44	Argentina	CEO Centro de Entrenamiento Olímpico, Asunción; Attendance: 990; Referees: Magalhães, Godoy (BRA)
12 October 2022; 16:30	Ozorio 5	(11–22)	Robledo 9	CEO Centro de Entrenamiento Olímpico, Asunción; Attendance: 990; Referees: Magalhães, Godoy (BRA)
12 October 2022; 16:30	1× (yellow card) 5× (suspension)	Report	3× (yellow card) 4× (suspension)	CEO Centro de Entrenamiento Olímpico, Asunción; Attendance: 990; Referees: Magalhães, Godoy (BRA)

13 October 2022; 14:30	Venezuela	35–35	Paraguay	CEO Centro de Entrenamiento Olímpico, Asunción; Attendance: 1,012; Referees: Sosa, Lemes (URU)
13 October 2022; 14:30	Peñaloza 10	(16–16)	Salinas 9	CEO Centro de Entrenamiento Olímpico, Asunción; Attendance: 1,012; Referees: Sosa, Lemes (URU)
13 October 2022; 14:30	2× (yellow card) 1× (suspension) 1× (red card)	Report	1× (yellow card) 5× (suspension)	CEO Centro de Entrenamiento Olímpico, Asunción; Attendance: 1,012; Referees: Sosa, Lemes (URU)

13 October 2022; 16:30	Chile	33–24	Uruguay	CEO Centro de Entrenamiento Olímpico, Asunción; Referees: Magalhães, Godoy (BRA)
13 October 2022; 16:30	Frelijj 6	(18–13)	Chaparro 6	CEO Centro de Entrenamiento Olímpico, Asunción; Referees: Magalhães, Godoy (BRA)
13 October 2022; 16:30	3× (yellow card) 5× (suspension)	Report	1× (yellow card) 5× (suspension)	CEO Centro de Entrenamiento Olímpico, Asunción; Referees: Magalhães, Godoy (BRA)

14 October 2022; 14:30	Uruguay	20–35	Argentina	CEO Centro de Entrenamiento Olímpico, Asunción; Attendance: 600; Referees: Magalhães, Godoy (BRA)
14 October 2022; 14:30	Chaparro, Falabrino 4	(10–14)	Baronetto 7	CEO Centro de Entrenamiento Olímpico, Asunción; Attendance: 600; Referees: Magalhães, Godoy (BRA)
14 October 2022; 14:30	1× (yellow card) 1× (suspension)	Report	1× (yellow card) 3× (suspension)	CEO Centro de Entrenamiento Olímpico, Asunción; Attendance: 600; Referees: Magalhães, Godoy (BRA)

14 October 2022; 16:30	Chile	43–22	Paraguay	CEO Centro de Entrenamiento Olímpico, Asunción; Attendance: 972; Referees: Paolantoni, García (ARG)
14 October 2022; 16:30	Ceballos, Donoso 6	(21–7)	Martínez 7	CEO Centro de Entrenamiento Olímpico, Asunción; Attendance: 972; Referees: Paolantoni, García (ARG)
14 October 2022; 16:30	2× (yellow card) 3× (suspension)	Report	1× (yellow card) 4× (suspension)	CEO Centro de Entrenamiento Olímpico, Asunción; Attendance: 972; Referees: Paolantoni, García (ARG)

15 October 2022; 10:00	Uruguay	28–27	Venezuela	CEO Centro de Entrenamiento Olímpico, Asunción; Attendance: 320; Referees: Magalhães, Godoy (BRA)
15 October 2022; 10:00	Rubbo 5	(13–15)	Peñaloza 10	CEO Centro de Entrenamiento Olímpico, Asunción; Attendance: 320; Referees: Magalhães, Godoy (BRA)
15 October 2022; 10:00	1× (yellow card) 2× (suspension)	Report	2× (yellow card) 6× (suspension)	CEO Centro de Entrenamiento Olímpico, Asunción; Attendance: 320; Referees: Magalhães, Godoy (BRA)

15 October 2022; 12:00	Argentina	29–21	Chile	CEO Centro de Entrenamiento Olímpico, Asunción; Attendance: 1,600; Referees: Sosa, Lemes (URU)
15 October 2022; 12:00	Fernández 6	(17–9)	Er. Feuchtmann 5	CEO Centro de Entrenamiento Olímpico, Asunción; Attendance: 1,600; Referees: Sosa, Lemes (URU)
15 October 2022; 12:00	3× (yellow card) 5× (suspension)	Report	2× (yellow card) 4× (suspension) 2× (red card)	CEO Centro de Entrenamiento Olímpico, Asunción; Attendance: 1,600; Referees: Sosa, Lemes (URU)

== Women's tournament ==
Pos	Team	Pld	W	D	L	GF	GA	GD	Pts	Qualification
1st place, gold medalist(s)	Brazil	5	5	0	0	176	73	+103	10	2023 Pan American Games
2nd place, silver medalist(s)	Paraguay (H)	5	3	0	2	135	105	+30	6 (Note: Argentina 22–23 Paraguay)	2023 Pan American Games
3rd place, bronze medalist(s)	Argentina	5	3	0	2	136	95	+41	6	
4	Uruguay	5	2	0	3	134	102	+32	4 (Note: Chile 21–27 Uruguay)	Last chance qualification tournament for the 2023 Pan American Games
5	Chile	5	2	0	3	130	112	+18	4	2023 Pan American Games as host
6	Bolivia	5	0	0	5	15	239	−224	0	

Source: Asunción 2022
Rules for classification: 1) points; 2) head-to-head points; 3) head-to-head goal difference; 4) head-to-head number of goals scored; 5) goal difference.
(H) Hosts
Notes:

All times are local (UTC–3).

6 October 2022; 14:00	Paraguay	19–34	Brazil	CEO Centro de Entrenamiento Olímpico, Asunción; Referees: Paolantoni, García (ARG)
6 October 2022; 14:00	Insfrán 7	(8–18)	Lima 6	CEO Centro de Entrenamiento Olímpico, Asunción; Referees: Paolantoni, García (ARG)
6 October 2022; 14:00	1× (yellow card) 3× (suspension)	Report	1× (yellow card) 5× (suspension)	CEO Centro de Entrenamiento Olímpico, Asunción; Referees: Paolantoni, García (ARG)

6 October 2022; 16:00	Argentina	48–1	Bolivia	CEO Centro de Entrenamiento Olímpico, Asunción; Attendance: 500; Referees: Aguilera, Gutiérrez (CHI)
6 October 2022; 16:00	Cáceres, Pedernera 7	(23–1)	Pol 1	CEO Centro de Entrenamiento Olímpico, Asunción; Attendance: 500; Referees: Aguilera, Gutiérrez (CHI)
6 October 2022; 16:00		Report	2× (suspension)	CEO Centro de Entrenamiento Olímpico, Asunción; Attendance: 500; Referees: Aguilera, Gutiérrez (CHI)

6 October 2022; 18:00	Chile	21–27	Uruguay	CEO Centro de Entrenamiento Olímpico, Asunción; Attendance: 222; Referees: Corrêa, Corrêa (BRA)
6 October 2022; 18:00	Araya, Ramírez 5	(9–15)	Barreiro 5	CEO Centro de Entrenamiento Olímpico, Asunción; Attendance: 222; Referees: Corrêa, Corrêa (BRA)
6 October 2022; 18:00	1× (yellow card) 3× (suspension)	Report	1× (yellow card) 5× (suspension)	CEO Centro de Entrenamiento Olímpico, Asunción; Attendance: 222; Referees: Corrêa, Corrêa (BRA)

7 October 2022; 14:00	Argentina	22–23	Paraguay	CEO Centro de Entrenamiento Olímpico, Asunción; Referees: Sosa, Lemes (URU)
7 October 2022; 14:00	Dalle Crode, Manzano 4	(9–8)	Insfrán 5	CEO Centro de Entrenamiento Olímpico, Asunción; Referees: Sosa, Lemes (URU)
7 October 2022; 14:00	2× (yellow card) 4× (suspension)	Report	2× (yellow card) 3× (suspension) 1× (red card)	CEO Centro de Entrenamiento Olímpico, Asunción; Referees: Sosa, Lemes (URU)

7 October 2022; 16:00	Bolivia	6–49	Chile	CEO Centro de Entrenamiento Olímpico, Asunción; Attendance: 500; Referees: Paolantoni, García (ARG)
7 October 2022; 16:00	Avendaño, Cáceres 2	(2–23)	Castro 11	CEO Centro de Entrenamiento Olímpico, Asunción; Attendance: 500; Referees: Paolantoni, García (ARG)
7 October 2022; 16:00	4× (suspension)	Report	1× (yellow card)	CEO Centro de Entrenamiento Olímpico, Asunción; Attendance: 500; Referees: Paolantoni, García (ARG)

7 October 2022; 18:00	Brazil	29–25	Uruguay	CEO Centro de Entrenamiento Olímpico, Asunción; Attendance: 223; Referees: Aguilera, Gutiérrez (CHI)
7 October 2022; 18:00	four players 4	(14–11)	Ferrari 9	CEO Centro de Entrenamiento Olímpico, Asunción; Attendance: 223; Referees: Aguilera, Gutiérrez (CHI)
7 October 2022; 18:00	2× (yellow card) 3× (suspension)	Report	1× (yellow card) 1× (suspension)	CEO Centro de Entrenamiento Olímpico, Asunción; Attendance: 223; Referees: Aguilera, Gutiérrez (CHI)

8 October 2022; 14:00	Uruguay	21–29	Paraguay	CEO Centro de Entrenamiento Olímpico, Asunción; Attendance: 1,500; Referees: Paolantoni, García (ARG)
8 October 2022; 14:00	Barreiro 8	(13–13)	Insfrán 8	CEO Centro de Entrenamiento Olímpico, Asunción; Attendance: 1,500; Referees: Paolantoni, García (ARG)
8 October 2022; 14:00	5× (suspension)	Report	2× (yellow card) 5× (suspension)	CEO Centro de Entrenamiento Olímpico, Asunción; Attendance: 1,500; Referees: Paolantoni, García (ARG)

8 October 2022; 16:00	Bolivia	1–54	Brazil	CEO Centro de Entrenamiento Olímpico, Asunción; Attendance: 427; Referees: Sosa, Lemes (URU)
8 October 2022; 16:00	Cáceres 1	(0–26)	Bolzan, Resende 10	CEO Centro de Entrenamiento Olímpico, Asunción; Attendance: 427; Referees: Sosa, Lemes (URU)
8 October 2022; 16:00	1× (suspension)	Report	1× (suspension)	CEO Centro de Entrenamiento Olímpico, Asunción; Attendance: 427; Referees: Sosa, Lemes (URU)

8 October 2022; 18:00	Chile	25–29	Argentina	CEO Centro de Entrenamiento Olímpico, Asunción; Attendance: 1,007; Referees: Corrêa, Corrêa (BRA)
8 October 2022; 18:00	Müller 6	(10–14)	Manzano 6	CEO Centro de Entrenamiento Olímpico, Asunción; Attendance: 1,007; Referees: Corrêa, Corrêa (BRA)
8 October 2022; 18:00	3× (suspension)	Report	1× (yellow card) 1× (suspension)	CEO Centro de Entrenamiento Olímpico, Asunción; Attendance: 1,007; Referees: Corrêa, Corrêa (BRA)

9 October 2022; 14:00	Paraguay	47–6	Bolivia	CEO Centro de Entrenamiento Olímpico, Asunción; Attendance: 1,507; Referees: Aguilera, Gutiérrez (CHI)
9 October 2022; 14:00	Aluan 13	(22–4)	Castillo, Pol 3	CEO Centro de Entrenamiento Olímpico, Asunción; Attendance: 1,507; Referees: Aguilera, Gutiérrez (CHI)
9 October 2022; 14:00		Report	2× (suspension)	CEO Centro de Entrenamiento Olímpico, Asunción; Attendance: 1,507; Referees: Aguilera, Gutiérrez (CHI)

9 October 2022; 16:00	Uruguay	20–22	Argentina	CEO Centro de Entrenamiento Olímpico, Asunción; Attendance: 850; Referees: Corrêa, Corrêa (BRA)
9 October 2022; 16:00	Barreiro, Schinca 5	(8–13)	Mena 5	CEO Centro de Entrenamiento Olímpico, Asunción; Attendance: 850; Referees: Corrêa, Corrêa (BRA)
9 October 2022; 16:00	1× (suspension) 1× (red card)	Report	1× (yellow card) 1× (suspension)	CEO Centro de Entrenamiento Olímpico, Asunción; Attendance: 850; Referees: Corrêa, Corrêa (BRA)

9 October 2022; 18:00	Brazil	33–13	Chile	CEO Centro de Entrenamiento Olímpico, Asunción; Attendance: 520; Referees: Sosa, Lemes (URU)
9 October 2022; 18:00	three players 5	(17–8)	Gómez 3	CEO Centro de Entrenamiento Olímpico, Asunción; Attendance: 520; Referees: Sosa, Lemes (URU)
9 October 2022; 18:00	1× (suspension)	Report	3× (suspension)	CEO Centro de Entrenamiento Olímpico, Asunción; Attendance: 520; Referees: Sosa, Lemes (URU)

10 October 2022; 14:00	Uruguay	41–1	Bolivia	CEO Centro de Entrenamiento Olímpico, Asunción; Attendance: 900; Referees: Aguilera, Gutiérrez (CHI)
10 October 2022; 14:00	Schinca 9	(20–0)	Pol 1	CEO Centro de Entrenamiento Olímpico, Asunción; Attendance: 900; Referees: Aguilera, Gutiérrez (CHI)
10 October 2022; 14:00	1× (yellow card)	Report	1× (yellow card) 2× (suspension)	CEO Centro de Entrenamiento Olímpico, Asunción; Attendance: 900; Referees: Aguilera, Gutiérrez (CHI)

10 October 2022; 16:00	Chile	22–17	Paraguay	CEO Centro de Entrenamiento Olímpico, Asunción; Attendance: 1,621; Referees: Paolantoni, García (ARG)
10 October 2022; 16:00	Müller 7	(11–10)	Fleitas 6	CEO Centro de Entrenamiento Olímpico, Asunción; Attendance: 1,621; Referees: Paolantoni, García (ARG)
10 October 2022; 16:00	1× (yellow card) 2× (suspension)	Report	1× (yellow card) 7× (suspension) 1× (red card)	CEO Centro de Entrenamiento Olímpico, Asunción; Attendance: 1,621; Referees: Paolantoni, García (ARG)

10 October 2022; 18:00	Brazil	26–15	Argentina	CEO Centro de Entrenamiento Olímpico, Asunción; Attendance: 750; Referees: Sosa, Lemes (URU)
10 October 2022; 18:00	Carvalho 6	(14–9)	Ponce 4	CEO Centro de Entrenamiento Olímpico, Asunción; Attendance: 750; Referees: Sosa, Lemes (URU)
10 October 2022; 18:00	3× (suspension)	Report	1× (suspension)	CEO Centro de Entrenamiento Olímpico, Asunción; Attendance: 750; Referees: Sosa, Lemes (URU)
