= Handball at the 2023 Pan American Games – Men's last chance qualification tournament =

2023 Last chance qualification tournament

Tournament details
- Host country: Paraguay
- City: 1
- Venue(s): 1 (in 1 host city)
- Dates: 3–5 August
- Teams: 3 (from 2 confederations)

Final positions
- Champions: Mexico
- Runner-up: Canada
- Third place: Paraguay

Tournament statistics
- Matches played: 3

The 2023 Last chance qualification tournament took place in Luque, Paraguay from 3 to 5 August. It acted as a qualifying tournament for the 2023 Pan American Games.

== Results ==
| Pos | Team | Pld | W | D | L | GF | GA | GD | Pts | Qualification |
|---|---|---|---|---|---|---|---|---|---|---|
| 1 | Mexico | 2 | 1 | 1 | 0 | 63 | 55 | +8 | 3 (Note: HTH points and goal difference the same because 26–26 draw: Mexico +8 GD; Canada +2 GD) | 2023 Pan American Games |
| 2 | Canada | 2 | 1 | 1 | 0 | 57 | 55 | +2 | 3 | |
| 3 | Paraguay (H) | 2 | 0 | 0 | 2 | 58 | 68 | −10 | 0 | |

Rules for classification: 1) Points; 2) Head-to-head points; 3) Head-to-head goal difference; 4) Head-to-head goals scored; 5) Goal difference; 6) Goals scored; 7) Draw.
(H) Hosts

== Round robin ==
All times are local (UTC−03:00).

| 3 August 2023; 20:30 | Paraguay | 29–31 | Canada | Parque Olímpico, Luque; Attendance: 450; Referees: Godoy, Magalhaes (BRA) |
| 3 August 2023; 20:30 | Viana 7 | (14–16) | Touzel 11 | Parque Olímpico, Luque; Attendance: 450; Referees: Godoy, Magalhaes (BRA) |
| 3 August 2023; 20:30 | 7× (suspension) | Report | 6× (suspension) 1× (red card) | Parque Olímpico, Luque; Attendance: 450; Referees: Godoy, Magalhaes (BRA) |

| 4 August 2023; 20:30 | Canada | 26–26 | Mexico | Parque Olímpico, Luque |

| 5 August 2023; 20:30 | Paraguay | 29–37 | Mexico | Parque Olímpico, Luque |
