= Bolivia women's national handball team =

Bolivia

Information
- Association: Federacion Boliviana de Handball

Colours
1st	2nd

Results

South and Central American Championship
- Appearances: 1 (First in 2021)
- Best result: 6th (2021)
- Last updated on Unknown.

The Bolivia women's national handball team is the national team of Bolivia. It is governed by the Federacion Boliviana de Handball and takes part in international handball competitions.

== Results ==
=== South and Central American Championship ===
Year	Round	Position	GP	W	D*	L	GS	GA
(Paraguay) 2021	Round robin	6th	5	0	0	5	36	270

=== South American Games ===
Year	Round	Position	GP	W	D*	L	GS	GA
(Bolivia) 2018	Consolation round	7th	4	0	0	4	36	154
(Paraguay) 2022	Round robin	6th	5	0	0	5	15	239

=== Bolivarian Games ===
Year	Round	Position	GP	W	D*	L	GS	GA
(Colombia) 2017	Round robin	6th	5	0	0	5	32	272
(Colombia) 2022	5th place match	6th	3	0	0	3	32	130
