= Renata Arruda =

Brazilian handball player (born 1999)

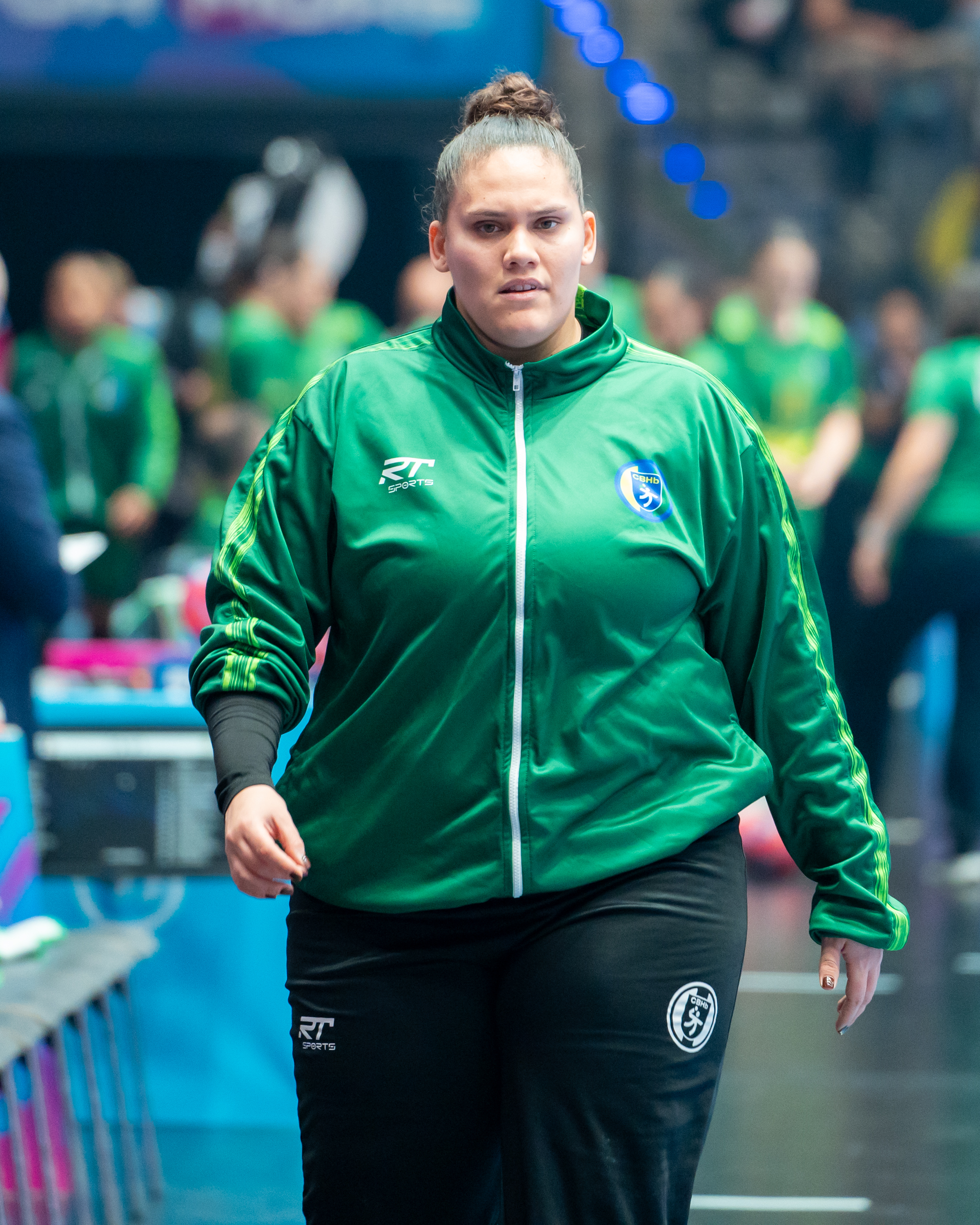

Personal information
- Full name: Renata Lais de Arruda
- Born: 18 February 1999 (age 27) Olinda, Brazil
- Height: 1.80 m (5 ft 11 in)

Sport
- Sport: Handball
- Position: Goalkeeper
- Current club: CS Gloria 2018
- Number: 87

Senior clubs
- Years: Team
- –: Clube Português do Recife
- 2017–2018: Club Balonmano La Calzada
- 2018–2021: BM Bera Bera
- 2021–2022: CS Măgura Cisnădie
- 2022–: CS Gloria 2018
National team
Years	Team	Apps	(Gls)
2018–	Brazil	77	(7)
Medal record
Pan American Games
Gold medal – first place	2019 Lima	Team
Gold medal – first place	2023 Santiago	Team
South and Central American Championship
Gold medal – first place	2018 Brazil
Gold medal – first place	2021 Paraguay
Gold medal – first place	2024 Brazil
Pan American Junior Championship
Gold medal – first place	2018 Brazil
Pan American Youth Championship
Gold medal – first place	2016 Chile
- Updated on 26 October 2025

Renata Lais de Arruda (born 18 February 1999) is a Brazilian handballer for CS Gloria 2018 and the Brazilian national team.

She was part of the Brazilian handball team in the Pan American Games in Lima 2019, winning the championship and a place at the Olympic Games in Tokyo.

== Achievements ==
- 2016 Pan American Women's Youth Handball Championship: Best player
- 2016 Pan American Women's Youth Handball Championship: All star team goalkeeper
- 2021 South and Central American Women's Handball Championship: All star team goalkeeper
