= Pedro Martínez Camí =

Argentine handball player

Pedro Martínez
Personal information
- Full name: Pedro Martínez Camí García
- Born: 20 December 1999 (age 26) Buenos Aires, Argentina
- Height: 1.90 m (6 ft 3 in)

Sport
- Sport: Handball
- Position: Centre back
- Current club: Balonmano Caserío Ciudad Real
Medal record
Pan American Games
Gold medal – first place	2023 Santiago	Team
South and Central American Championship
Gold medal – first place	2026 Paraguay
Silver medal – second place	2022 Brazil
Silver medal – second place	2024 Argentina
South American Games
Gold medal – first place	2022 Asunción	Team

Pedro Martínez Camí García (born 20 December 1999) is an Argentine handball player. He competed in the 2020 Summer Olympics.
