= Peru women's national handball team =

Peru

Information
- Association: Federacion Deportiva Peruana de Handball
- Coach: (Peru) Mario Ramos

Colours
1st	2nd
- Last updated on Unknown.

Peru women's national handball team is the team that represents Peru in international handball competitions and is governed by the Federacion Deportiva Peruana de Handball.

== Tournament history ==
=== Pan American Games ===
Games	Round	Position	Pld	W	D	L	GF	GA
(Peru) 2019 Lima	7th place match	8th	5	0	0	5	60	201

=== South American Games ===
Games	Round	Position	Pld	W	D	L	GF	GA
(Bolivia) 2018 Cochabamba	Consolation round	6th	4	1	0	3	79	128

=== Bolivarian Games ===
Games	Round	Position	Pld	W	D	L	GF	GA
(Colombia) 2017 Santa Marta	Round Robin	5th	5	1	0	4	74	218
(Colombia) 2022 Valledupar/Chía	Group stage	7th	3	0	0	3	86	128

=== World Championship qualification tournament ===
Tournament	Outcome	Position	Pld	W	D	L	GF	GA
(Colombia) 2025	not qualified	3rd	2	0	0	2	34	90

== Current squad ==
The squad chosen for the 2019 Pan American Games in Lima, Peru.

Head coach: Mario Ramos

No.	Pos.	Name	Date of birth (age)	Height	App.	Goals	Club
		Tiffany Angulo
		Derly Gálvez
		Karoline Salcedo
		Marcela Balarín
		Andrea Lizana
		Kelly Servat
		Ariana Cruz
		Maria Miranda
		Angie Vazquez
		Camila Delgado
		Rosa Porras
		Lucía Vilchez
		Mariana Díaz
		Sara Romero
