= Handball at the 2023 Pan American Games – Women's last chance qualification tournament =

2023 Last chance qualification tournament
Tournament details
- Host country: Dominican Republic
- City: 1
- Venue(s): 1 (in 1 host city)
- Dates: 25–27 August
- Teams: 3 (from 2 confederations)

Final positions
- Champions: Uruguay
- Runner-up: Dominican Republic
- Third place: United States

The 2023 Last chance qualification tournament took place in Santo Domingo, Dominican Republic from 25 to 27 August. It acted as a qualifying tournament for the 2023 Pan American Games.

== Results ==
Pos	Team	Pld	W	D	L	GF	GA	GD	Pts	Qualification
1	Uruguay	2	2	0	0	39	28	+11	4	2023 Pan American Games
2	Dominican Republic (H)	2	1	0	1	55	45	+10	2	
3	United States	2	0	0	2	16	37	−21	0	
4	Nicaragua	0	0	0	0	0	0	0	0	Withdraw before the competition started.

Rules for classification: 1) Points; 2) Head-to-head points; 3) Head-to-head goal difference; 4) Head-to-head goals scored; 5) Goal difference; 6) Goals scored; 7) Draw.
(H) Hosts

== Round robin ==
All times are local (UTC−04:00).

25 August 2023; 14:00	United States	16–27	Dominican Republic	Santo Domingo

26 August 2023	Uruguay	10–0	United States	Santo Domingo
26 August 2023		(withdraw)		Santo Domingo

27 August 2023; 18:00	Dominican Republic	28–29	Uruguay	Santo Domingo
27 August 2023; 18:00		(15–19)		Santo Domingo

== Controversy ==
The US team trained for 4 and a half days for the game. The following two days no training was possible because of a tropical storm which caused torrential rains and power outages. No other facilities were provided by the host for training. The roof of the gym leaked and the floor was flooded. Because of this, the Taraflex buckled and bulged. On 22 August, the USA voiced its concerns and complaints to the organizing committee. On 25 August at 10:00, the first game day, the host changed the start of the first game from 17:00 to 14:00. Therefore, it was no longer possible for the USA to complete a training session. In the first game the floor was slippery but manageable. In the evening and night, there was heavy rain fall again. The following day it was again not possible to have a training for the USA. At the warm-up of the second game, the referees voiced their concern about the floor's condition and safety to the host as did the IHF delegate from Mexico.

At this point a power outage occurred and USA Team Handball reported that the second match was delayed "due to weather conditions." Afterwards the teams were told that they would play the game for three minutes and after this the court would be assessed and further decisions would be made. Soon after the game started it became obvious that it was too dangerous to continue as the players and referees started to slide and fall. Dee Miller, an official from the USA, tried to stop the game but the host and the IHF delegate declined the request. Just 12 minutes into the game, the players and staff decided to stop. Later the game was canceled at a score 12-2 for Uruguay because the USA refused to play on "due to unplayable and unsafe conditions."

The third game between the Dominican Republic and Uruguay was played on an other court, on which they had practiced for five days without any problems. One day after the tournament the president of the Dominican Republic Handball Federation praised the performance. The USA has filed a complaint with NACHC and IHF.

Other complaints were that the USA didn't know at the first match day (25 August) which teams would play in the tournament and what the format would be. According to the Panam Sports, it should have been played on 20 August. But at request of the host, and with help from the NACHC, the tournament was pushed back to better fit in the schedule of the Dominican Republic. Without any approval by the NACHC, the host raised the participation fee from $50 per person to $60. On 11 September 2023, the USA national team wrote an open letter to the NACHC with three requests: All games of the NACHC have to follow the IHF regulations of minimum venue requirements; There be a procedure for how and when to retest game day court safety in extenuating circumstances; A full-cycle calendar of all NACHC competitions.
