= Handball at the 2023 Pan American Games – Women's tournament =

Women's handball at the XIX Pan American Games

Tournament details
- Host country: Chile
- Venue: 1 (in 1 host city)
- Dates: 24–29 October
- Teams: 8 (from 2 confederations)

Final positions
- Champions: Brazil (7th title)
- Runners-up: Argentina
- Third place: Paraguay
- Fourth place: Chile

Tournament statistics
- Matches played: 20
- Goals scored: 931 (46.55 per match)
- Top scorers: (Brazil) Adriana Castro (33 goals)

The women's handball tournament at the 2023 Pan American Games was the 9th edition of the handball event for women at the Pan American Games. It was held from 24 to 29 October 2023. All games were played at the Gimnasio Polideportivo in Viña del Mar, Chile.

The winner of this tournament, Brazil, qualified for the 2024 Summer Olympics in Paris, France.

== Schedule ==
The schedule is as follows.

Legend
G	Group stage	¼	Quarter-finals	½	Semi-finals	B	Bronze medal match	F	Gold medal match

Tue 24	Wed 25	Thu 26	Fri 27	Sat 28	Sun 29	
G	G	G		½	B	F

== Qualification ==
A total eight women's teams qualified to compete at the games in each tournament. The host nation (Chile) qualified automatically, along with seven other teams in various qualifying tournaments.

Event	Dates	Location	Quota(s)	Qualified
Host Nation	—N/a	—N/a	1	Chile
2021 Junior Pan American Games	23–28 November 2021	(Colombia) Cali	1	Argentina
2022 South American Games	6–10 October 2022	(Paraguay) Asunción	2	Brazil; Paraguay
USA–CAN Qualifying Round	10 & 13 November 2022	(United States) Lansing (Canada) Montreal	1	Canada
2023 Central American and Caribbean Games	24–29 June 2023	(El Salvador) San Salvador	2	Cuba; Puerto Rico
Last chance qualification tournament	25–27 August 2023	(Dominican Republic) Santo Domingo	1	Uruguay
Total			8	

== Results ==
All times are in Chile Time (UTC−3).

=== Preliminary round ===
==== Group A ====
Pos	Team	Pld	W	D	L	GF	GA	GD	Pts	Qualification
1	Argentina	3	3	0	0	105	42	+63	6	Semifinals
2	Chile (H)	3	2	0	1	61	57	+4	4	Semifinals
3	Puerto Rico	3	1	0	2	57	89	−32	2	5–8th place semifinals
4	Canada	3	0	0	3	44	79	−35	0	5–8th place semifinals

Source: Santiago 2023
Rules for classification: 1) points; 2) head-to-head points; 3) head-to-head goal difference; 4) head-to-head goals scored; 5) goal difference; 6) goals scored; 7) draw.
(H) Hosts

24 October 2023; 17:30	Argentina	46–17	Puerto Rico	Gimnasio Polideportivo de Viña del Mar; Referees: Corrêa, Corrêa (BRA)
24 October 2023; 17:30	Dalle Crode, Karsten 7	(21–9)	three players 3	Gimnasio Polideportivo de Viña del Mar; Referees: Corrêa, Corrêa (BRA)
24 October 2023; 17:30	2× (suspension)	Report	5× (suspension) 1× (red card)	Gimnasio Polideportivo de Viña del Mar; Referees: Corrêa, Corrêa (BRA)

24 October 2023; 20:00	Canada	14–23	Chile	Gimnasio Polideportivo de Viña del Mar; Referees: Correa, Converse (ARG)
24 October 2023; 20:00	Lacasse, Laplante 3	(11–11)	Lovera 7	Gimnasio Polideportivo de Viña del Mar; Referees: Correa, Converse (ARG)
24 October 2023; 20:00	6× (suspension) 1× (red card)	Report	1× (yellow card) 3× (suspension)	Gimnasio Polideportivo de Viña del Mar; Referees: Correa, Converse (ARG)

25 October 2023; 17:30	Chile	15–28	Argentina	Gimnasio Polideportivo de Viña del Mar; Referees: Sosa, Lemes (URU)
25 October 2023; 17:30	Lovera 5	(9–16)	Karsten 7	Gimnasio Polideportivo de Viña del Mar; Referees: Sosa, Lemes (URU)
25 October 2023; 17:30	2× (suspension)	Report	1× (yellow card) 4× (suspension)	Gimnasio Polideportivo de Viña del Mar; Referees: Sosa, Lemes (URU)

25 October 2023; 20:00	Puerto Rico	25–20	Canada	Gimnasio Polideportivo de Viña del Mar; Referees: Corrêa, Corrêa (BRA)
25 October 2023; 20:00	Cabrera, Hiraldo 6	(15–7)	Zimmer 6	Gimnasio Polideportivo de Viña del Mar; Referees: Corrêa, Corrêa (BRA)
25 October 2023; 20:00	1× (suspension)	Report	2× (suspension)	Gimnasio Polideportivo de Viña del Mar; Referees: Corrêa, Corrêa (BRA)

26 October 2023; 17:30	Argentina	31–10	Canada	Gimnasio Polideportivo de Viña del Mar; Referees: Aguilera, Gutiérrez (CHI)
26 October 2023; 17:30	Karsten 10	(15–4)	Laplante 3	Gimnasio Polideportivo de Viña del Mar; Referees: Aguilera, Gutiérrez (CHI)
26 October 2023; 17:30	1× (suspension)	Report	6× (suspension)	Gimnasio Polideportivo de Viña del Mar; Referees: Aguilera, Gutiérrez (CHI)

26 October 2023; 20:00	Puerto Rico	15–23	Chile	Gimnasio Polideportivo de Viña del Mar; Referees: García, Paolantoni (ARG)
26 October 2023; 20:00	Benítez, García 4	(12–9)	three players 4	Gimnasio Polideportivo de Viña del Mar; Referees: García, Paolantoni (ARG)
26 October 2023; 20:00	1× (yellow card) 1× (suspension) 1× (red card)	Report	1× (yellow card) 1× (suspension)	Gimnasio Polideportivo de Viña del Mar; Referees: García, Paolantoni (ARG)

==== Group B ====
Pos	Team	Pld	W	D	L	GF	GA	GD	Pts	Qualification
1	Brazil	3	3	0	0	104	35	+69	6	Semifinals
2	Paraguay	3	1	0	2	68	76	−8	2 (Note: Paraguay 2 Pts, +4 GD; Cuba 2 Pts, –1 GD; Uruguay 2 Pts, –3 GD)	Semifinals
3	Cuba	3	1	0	2	62	101	−39	2	5–8th place semifinals
4	Uruguay	3	1	0	2	53	75	−22	2	5–8th place semifinals

Source: Santiago 2023
Rules for classification: 1) points; 2) head-to-head points; 3) head-to-head goal difference; 4) head-to-head goals scored; 5) goal difference; 6) goals scored; 7) draw.
Notes:

24 October 2023; 10:00	Cuba	25–21	Uruguay	Gimnasio Polideportivo de Viña del Mar; Referees: Hansen, Madsen (DEN)
24 October 2023; 10:00	Reyes, Téllez 5	(13–6)	Barreiro 5	Gimnasio Polideportivo de Viña del Mar; Referees: Hansen, Madsen (DEN)
24 October 2023; 10:00	7× (suspension)	Report	2× (suspension)	Gimnasio Polideportivo de Viña del Mar; Referees: Hansen, Madsen (DEN)

24 October 2023; 12:30	Brazil	27–15	Paraguay	Gimnasio Polideportivo de Viña del Mar; Referees: Reyes, Zuñiga (CUB)
24 October 2023; 12:30	four players 4	(15–7)	Insfran 6	Gimnasio Polideportivo de Viña del Mar; Referees: Reyes, Zuñiga (CUB)
24 October 2023; 12:30	1× (yellow card) 4× (suspension)	Report	2× (suspension)	Gimnasio Polideportivo de Viña del Mar; Referees: Reyes, Zuñiga (CUB)

25 October 2023; 10:00	Uruguay	9–28	Brazil	Gimnasio Polideportivo de Viña del Mar; Referees: Correa, Conberse (ARG)
25 October 2023; 10:00	Bianco 6	(5–17)	Araújo 5	Gimnasio Polideportivo de Viña del Mar; Referees: Correa, Conberse (ARG)
25 October 2023; 10:00	2× (suspension)	Report	2× (suspension)	Gimnasio Polideportivo de Viña del Mar; Referees: Correa, Conberse (ARG)

25 October 2023; 12:30	Paraguay	31–26	Cuba	Gimnasio Polideportivo de Viña del Mar; Referees: García, Paolantoni (ARG)
25 October 2023; 12:30	Fernández, Leiva 6	(17–13)	Amorós 9	Gimnasio Polideportivo de Viña del Mar; Referees: García, Paolantoni (ARG)
25 October 2023; 12:30	1× (yellow card) 1× (suspension)	Report	2× (suspension)	Gimnasio Polideportivo de Viña del Mar; Referees: García, Paolantoni (ARG)

26 October 2023; 10:00	Paraguay	22–23	Uruguay	Gimnasio Polideportivo de Viña del Mar; Referees: Hansen, Madsen (DEN)
26 October 2023; 10:00	Fernández 8	(9–11)	Bianco 5	Gimnasio Polideportivo de Viña del Mar; Referees: Hansen, Madsen (DEN)
26 October 2023; 10:00	5× (suspension) 1× (red card)	Report	3× (suspension)	Gimnasio Polideportivo de Viña del Mar; Referees: Hansen, Madsen (DEN)

26 October 2023; 12:30	Brazil	49–11	Cuba	Gimnasio Polideportivo de Viña del Mar; Referees: Sosa, Lemes (URU)
26 October 2023; 12:30	Castro 10	(26–6)	Toledo 3	Gimnasio Polideportivo de Viña del Mar; Referees: Sosa, Lemes (URU)
26 October 2023; 12:30	4× (suspension)	Report	3× (suspension)	Gimnasio Polideportivo de Viña del Mar; Referees: Sosa, Lemes (URU)

=== Classification round ===
5–8th place semifinals
28 October — Viña del Mar
Cuba	26
Canada	20
28 October — Viña del Mar
Puerto Rico	30
Uruguay	23

Fifth place
29 October — Viña del Mar
Cuba	29
Puerto Rico	31
Seventh place
29 October — Viña del Mar
Canada	19
Uruguay	22

==== 5–8th place semifinals ====
28 October 2023; 10:00	Cuba	26–20	Canada	Gimnasio Polideportivo de Viña del Mar; Referees: García, Paolantoni (ARG)
28 October 2023; 10:00	Téllez 7	(13–6)	three players 4	Gimnasio Polideportivo de Viña del Mar; Referees: García, Paolantoni (ARG)
28 October 2023; 10:00	3× (suspension)	Report	1× (yellow card) 5× (suspension)	Gimnasio Polideportivo de Viña del Mar; Referees: García, Paolantoni (ARG)

28 October 2023; 12:30	Puerto Rico	30–23	Uruguay	Gimnasio Polideportivo de Viña del Mar; Referees: Corrêa, Corrêa (BRA)
28 October 2023; 12:30	Hiraldo, Benítez 6	(14–8)	Barreiro 10	Gimnasio Polideportivo de Viña del Mar; Referees: Corrêa, Corrêa (BRA)
28 October 2023; 12:30	1× (yellow card) 4× (suspension)	Report	3× (suspension)	Gimnasio Polideportivo de Viña del Mar; Referees: Corrêa, Corrêa (BRA)

==== Seventh place match ====
29 October 2023; 12:00	Canada	19–22	Uruguay	Gimnasio Polideportivo de Viña del Mar; Referees: Aguilera, Gutiérrez (CHI)
29 October 2023; 12:00	Routhier 6	(11–10)	Bianco 6	Gimnasio Polideportivo de Viña del Mar; Referees: Aguilera, Gutiérrez (CHI)
29 October 2023; 12:00	1× (yellow card) 8× (suspension) 1× (red card)	Report	2× (suspension)	Gimnasio Polideportivo de Viña del Mar; Referees: Aguilera, Gutiérrez (CHI)

==== Fifth place match ====
29 October 2023; 14:30	Cuba	29–31	Puerto Rico	Gimnasio Polideportivo de Viña del Mar; Referees: García, Paolantoni (ARG)
29 October 2023; 14:30	González 7	(13–12)	Ceballos 10	Gimnasio Polideportivo de Viña del Mar; Referees: García, Paolantoni (ARG)
29 October 2023; 14:30	1× (yellow card) 5× (suspension)	Report	2× (suspension)	Gimnasio Polideportivo de Viña del Mar; Referees: García, Paolantoni (ARG)

=== Medal round ===
Semifinals
28 October — Viña del Mar
Argentina	28
Paraguay	18
28 October — Viña del Mar
Brazil	30
Chile	10

Final
29 October — Viña del Mar
Argentina	18
Brazil	30
Third place
29 October — Viña del Mar
Paraguay	23
Chile	20

==== Semifinals ====
28 October 2023; 17:30	Argentina	28–18	Paraguay	Gimnasio Polideportivo de Viña del Mar; Referees: Reyes, Zuñiga (CUB)
28 October 2023; 17:30	three players 5	(10–7)	Fernández 6	Gimnasio Polideportivo de Viña del Mar; Referees: Reyes, Zuñiga (CUB)
28 October 2023; 17:30	3× (suspension)	Report	5× (suspension) 1× (red card)	Gimnasio Polideportivo de Viña del Mar; Referees: Reyes, Zuñiga (CUB)

28 October 2023; 20:00	Brazil	30–10	Chile	Gimnasio Polideportivo de Viña del Mar; Referees: Conberse, Correa (ARG)
28 October 2023; 20:00	Castro 11	(19–8)	Paul 3	Gimnasio Polideportivo de Viña del Mar; Referees: Conberse, Correa (ARG)
28 October 2023; 20:00	1× (yellow card) 2× (suspension)	Report	1× (yellow card) 1× (suspension)	Gimnasio Polideportivo de Viña del Mar; Referees: Conberse, Correa (ARG)

==== Bronze medal match ====
29 October 2023; 18:00	Paraguay	23–20	Chile	Gimnasio Polideportivo de Viña del Mar; Referees: Hansen, Madsen (DEN)
29 October 2023; 18:00	Insfran 10	(14–11)	Lovera 9	Gimnasio Polideportivo de Viña del Mar; Referees: Hansen, Madsen (DEN)
29 October 2023; 18:00	1× (yellow card) 3× (suspension) 1× (red card)	Report	1× (yellow card) 1× (suspension)	Gimnasio Polideportivo de Viña del Mar; Referees: Hansen, Madsen (DEN)

==== Gold medal match ====
29 October 2023; 20:30	Argentina	18–30	Brazil	Gimnasio Polideportivo de Viña del Mar; Referees: Sosa, Lemes (URU)
29 October 2023; 20:30	Pizzo 6	(7–16)	da Rocha 7	Gimnasio Polideportivo de Viña del Mar; Referees: Sosa, Lemes (URU)
29 October 2023; 20:30	1× (yellow card) 3× (suspension) 1× (red card)	Report	1× (yellow card) 5× (suspension)	Gimnasio Polideportivo de Viña del Mar; Referees: Sosa, Lemes (URU)

== Ranking and statistics ==
Rank	Team
1st place, gold medalist(s)	Brazil
2nd place, silver medalist(s)	Argentina
3rd place, bronze medalist(s)	Paraguay
4	Chile
5	Puerto Rico
6	Cuba
7	Uruguay
8	Canada

Qualified for the 2024 Summer Olympics
Qualified for the 2024 Olympic Qualification Tournaments

=== Top scorers ===
Rank	Name	Goals	Shots	%
1	(Brazil) Adriana Castro	33	48	69
2	(Paraguay) Fernanda Insfrán	32	45	71
3	(Paraguay) María Paula Fernández	29	47	62
4	(Argentina) Elke Karsten	25	34	74
4	(Chile) Valeska Lovera	25	43	58

Source: Santiago 2023

=== Top goalkeepers ===
Rank	Name	%	Saves	Shots
1	(Brazil) Gabriela Dias Moreschi	46	37	80
2	(Brazil) Renata Arruda	45	15	33
3	(Argentina) Fátima Rosalez	41	31	76
4	(Puerto Rico) Roxanaly Carrasquillo	33	41	123
4	(Argentina) Marisol Carratú	33	22	66

Source: Santiago 2023
