= 2021 South and Central American Women's Handball Championship =

Tournament details
- Host country: Paraguay
- Venue: 1 (in 1 host city)
- Dates: 5–9 October
- Teams: 6 (from 1 confederation)

Final positions
- Champions: Brazil (2nd title)
- Runners-up: Argentina
- Third place: Paraguay
- Fourth place: Uruguay

Tournament statistics
- Matches played: 15
- Goals scored: 807 (53.8 per match)
- Top scorers: (Chile) Valeska Lovera (38 goals)

‌The 2021 South and Central American Women's Handball Championship was the second edition of the championship and held from 5 to 9 October 2021 at Asunción, Paraguay under the aegis of South and Central America Handball Confederation. It was the first time in history that the championship is organised by the Paraguay Handball Confederation. It also acted as the qualification tournament for the 2021 World Women's Handball Championship, with the top three teams qualifying.

Brazil won the tournament for the second time after a finals win over Argentina.

== Qualified teams ==
| Competition | Dates | Vacancies | Qualified |
|---|---|---|---|
| Host nation | | 1 | Paraguay |
| Invited nations who confirmed presence | | 5 | Argentina; Bolivia; Brazil; Chile; Uruguay |
| 2021 Central American Women's Handball Championship | 5–7 August 2021 | 1 | ~~Nicaragua~~ |

- Because Nicaragua was not able to found enough money for the trip, they were replaced by Chile.

== Standings ==
| Pos | Team | Pld | W | D | L | GF | GA | GD | Pts | Qualification |
|---|---|---|---|---|---|---|---|---|---|---|
| 1st place, gold medalist(s) | Brazil | 5 | 5 | 0 | 0 | 158 | 79 | +79 | 10 | 2021 World Championship |
| 2nd place, silver medalist(s) | Argentina | 5 | 4 | 0 | 1 | 167 | 78 | +89 | 8 | 2021 World Championship |
| 3rd place, bronze medalist(s) | Paraguay (H) | 5 | 2 | 1 | 2 | 152 | 128 | +24 | 5 | 2021 World Championship |
| 4 | Uruguay | 5 | 1 | 2 | 2 | 145 | 127 | +18 | 4 | |
| 5 | Chile | 5 | 1 | 1 | 3 | 149 | 125 | +24 | 3 | |
| 6 | Bolivia | 5 | 0 | 0 | 5 | 36 | 270 | −234 | 0 | |

Source: CAH
Rules for classification: 1) Points; 2) Head-to-head points; 3) Head-to-head goal difference; 4) Head-to-head goals scored; 5) Goal difference; 6) Goals scored; 7) Draw.
(H) Hosts

== Results ==
All times are local (UTC−3).

| 5 October 2021; 16:00 | Brazil | 39–22 | Chile | Estadio Comite Olimpico Paraguayo, Asunción; Referees: Estrada, Pineda (COL) |
| 5 October 2021; 16:00 | Quintino 11 | (18–9) | Lovera 5 | Estadio Comite Olimpico Paraguayo, Asunción; Referees: Estrada, Pineda (COL) |
| 5 October 2021; 16:00 | 1× (yellow card) 4× (suspension) | Report | 5× (suspension) | Estadio Comite Olimpico Paraguayo, Asunción; Referees: Estrada, Pineda (COL) |

| 5 October 2021; 18:00 | Argentina | 57–2 | Bolivia | Estadio Comite Olimpico Paraguayo, Asunción; Referees: Osaldo, Cobá (MEX) |
| 5 October 2021; 18:00 | Urban 13 | (32–1) | Anze, Pol 1 | Estadio Comite Olimpico Paraguayo, Asunción; Referees: Osaldo, Cobá (MEX) |
| 5 October 2021; 18:00 | 1× (suspension) | Report | 5× (suspension) | Estadio Comite Olimpico Paraguayo, Asunción; Referees: Osaldo, Cobá (MEX) |

| 5 October 2021; 20:00 | Paraguay | 25–25 | Uruguay | Estadio Comite Olimpico Paraguayo, Asunción; Attendance: 1,500; Referees: Correa, Conberse (ARG) |
| 5 October 2021; 20:00 | Acuña 7 | (11–10) | Pessina 4 | Estadio Comite Olimpico Paraguayo, Asunción; Attendance: 1,500; Referees: Correa, Conberse (ARG) |
| 5 October 2021; 20:00 | 1× (yellow card) 3× (suspension) | Report | 6× (suspension) | Estadio Comite Olimpico Paraguayo, Asunción; Attendance: 1,500; Referees: Correa, Conberse (ARG) |

| 6 October 2021; 16:00 | Bolivia | 9–71 | Paraguay | Estadio Comite Olimpico Paraguayo, Asunción; Referees: Lemes, Sosa (URU) |
| 6 October 2021; 16:00 | Castillo 4 | (3–34) | Fleitas 19 | Estadio Comite Olimpico Paraguayo, Asunción; Referees: Lemes, Sosa (URU) |
| 6 October 2021; 16:00 | 2× (suspension) | Report | 2× (yellow card) 2× (suspension) | Estadio Comite Olimpico Paraguayo, Asunción; Referees: Lemes, Sosa (URU) |

| 6 October 2021; 18:00 | Uruguay | 18–36 | Brazil | Estadio Comite Olimpico Paraguayo, Asunción; Referees: Pineda, Estrada (COL) |
| 6 October 2021; 18:00 | Bianco 5 | (7–15) | Belo 7 | Estadio Comite Olimpico Paraguayo, Asunción; Referees: Pineda, Estrada (COL) |
| 6 October 2021; 18:00 | 1× (yellow card) 3× (suspension) 1× (red card) | Report | 4× (suspension) | Estadio Comite Olimpico Paraguayo, Asunción; Referees: Pineda, Estrada (COL) |

| 6 October 2021; 20:00 | Chile | 17–26 | Argentina | Estadio Comite Olimpico Paraguayo, Asunción; Attendance: 160; Referees: Correa, Correa (BRA) |
| 6 October 2021; 20:00 | Lovera 3 | (4–13) | Dalle Crode 4 | Estadio Comite Olimpico Paraguayo, Asunción; Attendance: 160; Referees: Correa, Correa (BRA) |
| 6 October 2021; 20:00 | 1× (yellow card) 3× (suspension) | Report | 1× (yellow card) 5× (suspension) | Estadio Comite Olimpico Paraguayo, Asunción; Attendance: 160; Referees: Correa, Correa (BRA) |

| 7 October 2021; 16:00 | Brazil | 10–0 (Note: The match was cancelled, after the Bolivian team had three players who felt unable to play, including two goalkeepers, resulting in a win for Brazil.) | Bolivia | Estadio Comite Olimpico Paraguayo, Asunción; Referees: Osaldo, Cobá (MEX) |
| 7 October 2021; 16:00 | | Report | | Estadio Comite Olimpico Paraguayo, Asunción; Referees: Osaldo, Cobá (MEX) |

| 7 October 2021; 18:00 | Chile | 21–21 | Uruguay | Estadio Comite Olimpico Paraguayo, Asunción; Attendance: 100; Referees: Correa, Conberse (ARG) |
| 7 October 2021; 18:00 | Lovera 8 | (9–7) | Fynn 5 | Estadio Comite Olimpico Paraguayo, Asunción; Attendance: 100; Referees: Correa, Conberse (ARG) |
| 7 October 2021; 18:00 | 3× (suspension) | Report | 6× (suspension) | Estadio Comite Olimpico Paraguayo, Asunción; Attendance: 100; Referees: Correa, Conberse (ARG) |

| 7 October 2021; 20:00 | Argentina | 29–13 | Paraguay | Estadio Comite Olimpico Paraguayo, Asunción; Attendance: 400; Referees: Araújo, Perdomo (URU) |
| 7 October 2021; 20:00 | Karsten 7 | (14–5) | Acuña 6 | Estadio Comite Olimpico Paraguayo, Asunción; Attendance: 400; Referees: Araújo, Perdomo (URU) |
| 7 October 2021; 20:00 | 2× (suspension) | Report | 5× (suspension) 1× (red card) | Estadio Comite Olimpico Paraguayo, Asunción; Attendance: 400; Referees: Araújo, Perdomo (URU) |

| 8 October 2021; 16:00 | Bolivia | 13–66 | Chile | Estadio Comite Olimpico Paraguayo, Asunción; Attendance: 50; Referees: Estrada, Pineda (COL) |
| 8 October 2021; 16:00 | Castillo 6 | (4–27) | Lovera 14 | Estadio Comite Olimpico Paraguayo, Asunción; Attendance: 50; Referees: Estrada, Pineda (COL) |
| 8 October 2021; 16:00 | 3× (suspension) | Report | 1× (yellow card) 1× (suspension) | Estadio Comite Olimpico Paraguayo, Asunción; Attendance: 50; Referees: Estrada, Pineda (COL) |

| 8 October 2021; 18:00 | Argentina | 33–15 | Uruguay | Estadio Comite Olimpico Paraguayo, Asunción; Attendance: 180; Referees: Correa, Correa (BRA) |
| 8 October 2021; 18:00 | Karsten 9 | (14–11) | Grosso 5 | Estadio Comite Olimpico Paraguayo, Asunción; Attendance: 180; Referees: Correa, Correa (BRA) |
| 8 October 2021; 18:00 | 2× (suspension) | Report | 6× (suspension) | Estadio Comite Olimpico Paraguayo, Asunción; Attendance: 180; Referees: Correa, Correa (BRA) |

| 8 October 2021; 20:00 | Paraguay | 17–42 | Brazil | Estadio Comite Olimpico Paraguayo, Asunción; Attendance: 350; Referees: Araújo, Perdomo (URU) |
| 8 October 2021; 20:00 | Fernández 4 | (5–22) | De Castro 6 | Estadio Comite Olimpico Paraguayo, Asunción; Attendance: 350; Referees: Araújo, Perdomo (URU) |
| 8 October 2021; 20:00 | 2× (suspension) | Report | 1× (yellow card) 1× (suspension) 1× (red card) | Estadio Comite Olimpico Paraguayo, Asunción; Attendance: 350; Referees: Araújo, Perdomo (URU) |

| 9 October 2021; 16:00 | Uruguay | 66–12 | Bolivia | Estadio Comite Olimpico Paraguayo, Asunción; Attendance: 250; Referees: Cobá, Osaldo (MEX) |
| 9 October 2021; 16:00 | Eastman, Tournier 13 | (29–6) | Pol 4 | Estadio Comite Olimpico Paraguayo, Asunción; Attendance: 250; Referees: Cobá, Osaldo (MEX) |
| 9 October 2021; 16:00 | 1× (suspension) | Report | 3× (suspension) | Estadio Comite Olimpico Paraguayo, Asunción; Attendance: 250; Referees: Cobá, Osaldo (MEX) |

| 9 October 2021; 18:00 | Paraguay | 26–23 | Chile | Estadio Comite Olimpico Paraguayo, Asunción; Referees: Correa, Conberse (ARG) |
| 9 October 2021; 18:00 | Mendoza 7 | (14–13) | Lovera 8 | Estadio Comite Olimpico Paraguayo, Asunción; Referees: Correa, Conberse (ARG) |
| 9 October 2021; 18:00 | 2× (yellow card) 6× (suspension) | Report | 1× (yellow card) 4× (suspension) | Estadio Comite Olimpico Paraguayo, Asunción; Referees: Correa, Conberse (ARG) |

| 9 October 2021; 20:00 | Brazil | 31–22 | Argentina | Estadio Comite Olimpico Paraguayo, Asunción; Attendance: 700; Referees: Lemes, Sosa (URU) |
| 9 October 2021; 20:00 | Quintino 7 | (17–8) | Cavo 5 | Estadio Comite Olimpico Paraguayo, Asunción; Attendance: 700; Referees: Lemes, Sosa (URU) |
| 9 October 2021; 20:00 | 1× (yellow card) 4× (suspension) | Report | 2× (suspension) | Estadio Comite Olimpico Paraguayo, Asunción; Attendance: 700; Referees: Lemes, Sosa (URU) |

== Statistics and awards ==
=== Top goalscorers ===
| Rank | Player | Goals |
|---|---|---|
| 1 | (Chile) Valeska Lovera | 38 |
| 2 | (Argentina) Rosario Urban | 32 |
| 3 | (Brazil) Jéssica Quintino | 28 |
| 4 | (Chile) Romina Ramírez | 25 |
| 4 | (Paraguay) Fátima Acuña | 25 |
| 6 | (Argentina) Malena Cavo | 22 |
| 6 | (Paraguay) Jessica Fleitas | 22 |
| 8 | (Argentina) Elke Karsten | 19 |
| 8 | (Paraguay) Fernanda Insfrán | 19 |
| 8 | (Uruguay) Viviana Ferrari | 19 |
| 8 | (Uruguay) Catalina Tournier | 19 |

=== All-Star team ===
The All Star Team was announced on 11 October 2020.

| Position | Player |
|---|---|
| Goalkeeper | (Brazil) Renata Arruda |
| Right wing | (Brazil) Jéssica Quintino |
| Right back | (Argentina) Malena Cavo |
| Centre back | (Brazil) Ana Paula Belo |
| Left back | (Argentina) Elke Karsten |
| Left wing | (Paraguay) Fátima Acuña |
| Pivot | (Brazil) Tamires Morena Lima |
