= Handball at the South American Games =

Handball has been a South American Games event since 2002 in São Bernardo do Campo, Brazil. In addition to crowning the handball champions of the South American Games, the tournament also serves as a qualifying tournament for the Pan American Games.

== Men ==
=== Summary ===
Year	Host	Final			Third place match		
Year	Host	Champion	Score	Runner-up	Third place	Score	Fourth place
2002; Details	(Brazil); São Bernardo do Campo	Argentina	20–18	Brazil	Uruguay	24–17	Chile
2006; Details	(Argentina); Buenos Aires	Argentina	28–21	Uruguay	Chile	43–24	Paraguay
2010; Details	(Colombia); Medellín	Brazil	No playoffs	Argentina	Chile	No playoffs	Uruguay
2014; Details	(Chile); Santiago	Brazil	25–23	Argentina	Chile	27–21	Uruguay
2018; Details	(Bolivia); Cochabamba	Brazil	25–22	Argentina	Chile	23–20	Uruguay
2022; Details	(Paraguay); Asunción	Argentina	No playoffs	Chile	Uruguay	No playoffs	Paraguay

=== Medal table ===
Rank	Nation	Gold	Silver	Bronze	Total
1	Argentina	3	3	0	6
2	Brazil	3	1	0	4
3	Chile	0	1	4	5
4	Uruguay	0	1	2	3
Totals (4 entries)		6	6	6	18

=== Participating nations ===
Nation	(Brazil) 2002	(Argentina) 2006	(Colombia) 2010	(Chile) 2014	(Bolivia) 2018	(Paraguay) 2022	Years
Argentina	1st	1st	2nd	2nd	2nd	1st	6
Bolivia	-	-	-	-	7th	-	1
Brazil	2nd	-	1st	1st	1st	-	4
Chile	4th	3rd	3rd	3rd	3rd	2nd	6
Colombia	-	-	5th	7th	-	-	2
Paraguay	5th	4th	-	6th	-	4th	4
Peru	-	-	-	-	6th	-	1
Uruguay	3rd	2nd	4th	4th	4th	3rd	6
Venezuela	-	-	-	5th	5th	5th	3
Total	5	4	5	7	7	5	

== Women ==
=== Summary ===
Year	Host	Final			Third place match		
Year	Host	Champion	Score	Runner-up	Third place	Score	Fourth place
2002; Details	(Brazil); São Bernardo do Campo	Brazil	26–13	Argentina	Uruguay	25–16	Paraguay
2006; Details	(Argentina); Mar del Plata	Argentina	27–26	Paraguay	Chile	24–23	Uruguay
2010; Details	(Colombia); Medellín	Argentina	No playoffs	Brazil	Uruguay	No playoffs	Chile
2014; Details	(Chile); Santiago	Brazil	No playoffs	Argentina	Chile	No playoffs	Uruguay
2018; Details	(Bolivia); Cochabamba	Brazil	26–12	Argentina	Chile	31–25	Paraguay
2022; Details	(Paraguay); Asunción	Brazil	No playoffs	Paraguay	Argentina	No playoffs	Uruguay
2026; Details	(Argentina); Santa Fe	Argentina	No playoffs	Paraguay	Chile	No playoffs	Uruguay

=== Medal table ===
Rank	Nation	Gold	Silver	Bronze	Total
1	Brazil	4	1	0	5
2	Argentina	3	3	1	7
3	Paraguay	0	3	0	3
4	Chile	0	0	4	4
5	Uruguay	0	0	2	2
Totals (5 entries)		7	7	7	21

=== Participating nations ===
Nation	(Brazil) 2002	(Argentina) 2006	(Colombia) 2010	(Chile) 2014	(Bolivia) 2018	(Paraguay) 2022	(Argentina) 2026	Years
Argentina	2nd	1st	1st	2nd	2nd	3rd	1st	7
Bolivia	-	-	-	-	7th	6th		2
Brazil	1st	-	2nd	1st	1st	1st		5
Chile	-	3rd	4th	3rd	3rd	5th	3rd	6
Colombia	-	-	6th	-	-	-	5th	2
Paraguay	4th	2nd	5th	5th	4th	2nd	2nd	7
Peru	-	-	-	-	6th	-	6th	2
Uruguay	3rd	4th	3rd	4th	5th	4th	4th	7
Total	4	4	6	5	7	6	6	
