= Elías Oyarzún =

Chilean handball player (born 1988)

Personal information
- Nationality: Chilean
- Born: 11 December 1988 (age 37)
- Height: 1.74 m (5 ft 9 in)

Sport
- Sport: Handball
- Position: Left wing
- Current club: Balónmano Ovalle
National team
Years	Team	Apps	(Gls)
–	Chile	17	(46)
Medal record
Pan American Games
Silver medal – second place	2019 Lima	Team
Pan American Championship
Bronze medal – third place	2018 Greenland
South American Games
Bronze medal – third place	2018 Cochabamba	Team
Bolivarian Games
Gold medal – first place	2017 Santa Marta

Elías Oyarzún (born 11 December 1988) is a Chilean handball player for Balónmano Ovalle and the Chilean national team.

He participated at the 2019 World Men's Handball Championship.
