= Matches of Polish men's volleyball national team conducted by Stéphane Antiga =

List matches of Polish men's volleyball national team conducted by Stéphane Antiga, who was announced a coach of Polish national team on October 24, 2013.

Overall
Victories	Defeats
63	31

== Achievements ==
No.		Tournament	Place	Date	Final opponent	Result	Won/Lost
1.	7th	FIVB World League	Intercontinental round	29 May–5 Jul 2014	–	–	6/6
2.	Gold medal	FIVB World Championship	Poland	21 September 2014	Brazil	3–1 (18:25, 25:22, 25:23, 25:22)	15/1
3.	4th	FIVB World League	Brazil	19 July 2015	United States	0–3 (22:25, 23:25, 23:25)	9/7
4.	Bronze medal	FIVB World Cup	Japan	8–23 Sep 2015	–	–	10/1
5.	5th	CEV European Championship	Bulgaria & Italy	9–18 Oct 2015	–	–	3/1
6.	5th	FIVB World League	Poland	16 Jun–17 Jul 2016	–	–	4/7
7.	5th	Olympic Games	Brazil	7–21 Aug 2016			

== Official matches ==
=== 2015 European Championship qualification ===
May 16, 2014; 17:30	Poland	3–0	Latvia	(Poland) Centennial Hall, Wrocław; Attendance: 2,100; Referees: RYCHLIK Dusan - NESTERENKO Kirill
May 16, 2014; 17:30	(25–15, 25–23, 25–16)			(Poland) Centennial Hall, Wrocław; Attendance: 2,100; Referees: RYCHLIK Dusan - NESTERENKO Kirill

May 17, 2014; 18:00	Poland	3–0	Macedonia	(Poland) Centennial Hall, Wrocław; Attendance: 3,500; Referees: NESTERENKO Kirill - HOGER Peter
May 17, 2014; 18:00	(25–13, 25–15, 25–15)			(Poland) Centennial Hall, Wrocław; Attendance: 3,500; Referees: NESTERENKO Kirill - HOGER Peter

May 18, 2014; 18:00	Poland	3–1	Slovenia	(Poland) Centennial Hall, Wrocław; Attendance: 4,200; Referees: RYCHLIK Dusan - HOGER Peter
May 18, 2014; 18:00	(25–15, 26–24, 23–25, 25–20)			(Poland) Centennial Hall, Wrocław; Attendance: 4,200; Referees: RYCHLIK Dusan - HOGER Peter

May 23, 2014; 17:00	Slovenia	3–2	Poland	(Slovenia) Dvorana Center, Stožice; Attendance: 4,200; Referees: DELIKOSTIDIS Sotirios - HUSEJNOVIC Jasmin
May 23, 2014; 17:00	(20–25, 24–26, 27–25, 26–24, 15–11)			(Slovenia) Dvorana Center, Stožice; Attendance: 4,200; Referees: DELIKOSTIDIS Sotirios - HUSEJNOVIC Jasmin

May 24, 2014; 19:00	Latvia	0–3	Poland	(Slovenia) Dvorana Center, Stožice; Attendance: 100; Referees: CAMBRE Wim - DELIKOSTIDIS Sotirios
May 24, 2014; 19:00	(22–25, 17–25, 18–25)			(Slovenia) Dvorana Center, Stožice; Attendance: 100; Referees: CAMBRE Wim - DELIKOSTIDIS Sotirios

May 25, 2014; 16:00	Macedonia	0–3	Poland	(Slovenia) Dvorana Center, Stožice; Attendance: 65; Referees: CAMBRE Wim - HUSEJNOVIC Jasmin
May 25, 2014; 16:00	(19–25, 19–25, 21–25)			(Slovenia) Dvorana Center, Stožice; Attendance: 65; Referees: CAMBRE Wim - HUSEJNOVIC Jasmin

=== 2014 FIVB World League ===
==== Pool A ====
May 29, 2014; 14:45 Coordinated Universal Time (UTC-02:00)	Brazil	3–0	Poland	(Brazil) Ginásio Chico Neto, Maringá; Attendance: 6,000; Referees: SHAABAN Nasr (EGY) - CHOLAKIAN Rolando (ARG)
May 29, 2014; 14:45 Coordinated Universal Time (UTC-02:00)	(25–23, 29–27, 25–19),			(Brazil) Ginásio Chico Neto, Maringá; Attendance: 6,000; Referees: SHAABAN Nasr (EGY) - CHOLAKIAN Rolando (ARG)

May 30, 2014; 14:45 Coordinated Universal Time (UTC-02:00)	Brazil	0–3	Poland	(Brazil) Ginásio Chico Neto, Maringá; Attendance: 6,000; Referees: CHOLAKIAN Rolando (ARG) - SHAABAN Nasr (EGY)
May 30, 2014; 14:45 Coordinated Universal Time (UTC-02:00)	(24–26, 26–28, 21–25),			(Brazil) Ginásio Chico Neto, Maringá; Attendance: 6,000; Referees: CHOLAKIAN Rolando (ARG) - SHAABAN Nasr (EGY)

June 6, 2014; 20:30 Central European Summer Time (UTC+02:00)	Italy	3–1	Poland	(Italy) Pala Florio, Bari; Attendance: 4,900; Referees: Loderus F. (NED) - Alenezi A. (KUW)
June 6, 2014; 20:30 Central European Summer Time (UTC+02:00)	(25–22, 20–25, 25–23, 25–20),			(Italy) Pala Florio, Bari; Attendance: 4,900; Referees: Loderus F. (NED) - Alenezi A. (KUW)

June 8, 2014; 20:00 Central European Summer Time (UTC+02:00)	Italy	3–1	Poland	(Italy) Foro Italico, Rome; Attendance: 11,000; Referees: Alenezi A. (KUW) - Loderus F. (NED)
June 8, 2014; 20:00 Central European Summer Time (UTC+02:00)	(25–21, 25–20, 15–25, 25–17),			(Italy) Foro Italico, Rome; Attendance: 11,000; Referees: Alenezi A. (KUW) - Loderus F. (NED)

June 13, 2014; 19:30 Central European Summer Time (UTC+02:00)	Poland	3–2	Italy	(Poland) Spodek, Katowice; Attendance: 11,200; Referees: LABASTA Milan (CZE) - AZEVEDO Avelino (POR)
June 13, 2014; 19:30 Central European Summer Time (UTC+02:00)	(25–23, 24–26, 26–24, 25–27, 15–10),			(Poland) Spodek, Katowice; Attendance: 11,200; Referees: LABASTA Milan (CZE) - AZEVEDO Avelino (POR)

June 15, 2014; 19:30 Central European Summer Time (UTC+02:00)	Poland	3–1	Italy	(Poland) Atlas Arena, Łódź; Attendance: 12,000; Referees: AZEVEDO Avelino (POR) - LABASTA Milan (CZE)
June 15, 2014; 19:30 Central European Summer Time (UTC+02:00)	(25–22, 25–23, 23–25, 25–15),			(Poland) Atlas Arena, Łódź; Attendance: 12,000; Referees: AZEVEDO Avelino (POR) - LABASTA Milan (CZE)

June 20, 2014; 19:30 Central European Summer Time (UTC+02:00)	Poland	3–1	Brazil	(Poland) Kraków Arena, Kraków; Attendance: 15,250; Referees: JAAFAR Ali (BRN) - JIANG Liu (CHN)
June 20, 2014; 19:30 Central European Summer Time (UTC+02:00)	(25–20, 25–21, 28–30, 25–20),			(Poland) Kraków Arena, Kraków; Attendance: 15,250; Referees: JAAFAR Ali (BRN) - JIANG Liu (CHN)

June 22, 2014; 19:30 Central European Summer Time (UTC+02:00)	Poland	0–3	Brazil	(Poland) Łuczniczka, Bydgoszcz; Attendance: 8,060; Referees: JIANG Liu (CHN) - JAAFAR Ali (BRN)
June 22, 2014; 19:30 Central European Summer Time (UTC+02:00)	(21–25, 16–25, 17–25),			(Poland) Łuczniczka, Bydgoszcz; Attendance: 8,060; Referees: JIANG Liu (CHN) - JAAFAR Ali (BRN)

June 27, 2014; 21:00 Iran Daylight Time (UTC+04:30)	Iran	3–1	Poland	(Iran) Azadi Indoor Stadium, Tehran; Attendance: 12,000; Referees: TANO Akihiko (JPN) - LABASTA Milan (CZE)
June 27, 2014; 21:00 Iran Daylight Time (UTC+04:30)	(23–25, 25–16, 25–11, 25–19),			(Iran) Azadi Indoor Stadium, Tehran; Attendance: 12,000; Referees: TANO Akihiko (JPN) - LABASTA Milan (CZE)

June 29, 2014; 21:00 Iran Daylight Time (UTC+04:30)	Iran	3–0	Poland	(Iran) Azadi Indoor Stadium, Tehran; Attendance: 12,000; Referees: LABASTA Milan (CZE) - TANO Akihiko (JPN)
June 29, 2014; 21:00 Iran Daylight Time (UTC+04:30)	(25–22, 25–20, 25–22),			(Iran) Azadi Indoor Stadium, Tehran; Attendance: 12,000; Referees: LABASTA Milan (CZE) - TANO Akihiko (JPN)

July 4, 2014; 20:15 Central European Summer Time (UTC+02:00)	Poland	3–1	Iran	(Poland) Ergo Arena, Gdańsk; Attendance: 6,200; Referees: CESPEDES Denis (DOM) - CHOLAKIAN Rolando (ARG)
July 4, 2014; 20:15 Central European Summer Time (UTC+02:00)	(17–25, 26–24, 25–23, 25–23),			(Poland) Ergo Arena, Gdańsk; Attendance: 6,200; Referees: CESPEDES Denis (DOM) - CHOLAKIAN Rolando (ARG)

July 5, 2014; 20:15 Central European Summer Time (UTC+02:00)	Poland	3–0	Iran	(Poland) Ergo Arena, Gdańsk; Attendance: 6,800; Referees: CHOLAKIAN Rolando (ARG) - CESPEDES Denis (DOM)
July 5, 2014; 20:15 Central European Summer Time (UTC+02:00)	(25–23, 25–20, 25–17),			(Poland) Ergo Arena, Gdańsk; Attendance: 6,800; Referees: CHOLAKIAN Rolando (ARG) - CESPEDES Denis (DOM)

=== 2014 FIVB World Championship ===
- All times are Central European Summer Time (UTC+02:00)

==== Pool A ====
August 30, 2014; 20:15	Poland	3–0	Serbia	(Poland) National Stadium, Warsaw; Attendance: 61,500; Referees: LODERUS Frans (NED) - MOKRY Juraj (SVK)
August 30, 2014; 20:15	(25–19, 25–18, 25–18)			(Poland) National Stadium, Warsaw; Attendance: 61,500; Referees: LODERUS Frans (NED) - MOKRY Juraj (SVK)

September 2, 2014; 20:15	Australia	0–3	Poland	(Poland) Centennial Hall, Wrocław; Attendance: 5,263; Referees: TURCI Paulo (BRA) - ALBRIGHT Paul (USA)
September 2, 2014; 20:15	(17–25, 19–25, 22–25)			(Poland) Centennial Hall, Wrocław; Attendance: 5,263; Referees: TURCI Paulo (BRA) - ALBRIGHT Paul (USA)

September 4, 2014; 20:15	Poland	3–0	Venezuela	(Poland) Centennial Hall, Wrocław; Attendance: 6,819; Referees: ALBRIGHT Paul (USA) - WENSHENG Luo (CHN)
September 4, 2014; 20:15	(25–20, 25–13, 25–14)			(Poland) Centennial Hall, Wrocław; Attendance: 6,819; Referees: ALBRIGHT Paul (USA) - WENSHENG Luo (CHN)

September 6, 2014; 20:15	Cameroon	1–3	Poland	(Poland) Centennial Hall, Wrocław; Attendance: 6,951; Referees: WENSHENG Luo (CHN) - TURCI Paulo (BRA)
September 6, 2014; 20:15	(27–25, 23–25, 16–25, 22–25)			(Poland) Centennial Hall, Wrocław; Attendance: 6,951; Referees: WENSHENG Luo (CHN) - TURCI Paulo (BRA)

September 7, 2014; 16:40	Poland	3–0	Argentina	(Poland) Centennial Hall, Wrocław; Attendance: 6,951; Referees: TURCI Paulo (BRA) - LABASTA Milan (CZE)
September 7, 2014; 16:40	(25–20, 25–20, 25–23)			(Poland) Centennial Hall, Wrocław; Attendance: 6,951; Referees: TURCI Paulo (BRA) - LABASTA Milan (CZE)

==== Pool E ====
September 10, 2014; 20:25	United States	3–1	Poland	(Poland) Atlas Arena, Łódź; Attendance: 10,600; Referees: ALI Jafaar (BRN) - BOUDAYA Taoufik (TUN)
September 10, 2014; 20:25	(29–27, 25–22, 25–27, 25–23)			(Poland) Atlas Arena, Łódź; Attendance: 10,600; Referees: ALI Jafaar (BRN) - BOUDAYA Taoufik (TUN)

September 11, 2014; 20:25	Poland	3–1	Italy	(Poland) Atlas Arena, Łódź; Attendance: 11,800; Referees: RAMIREZ Yuri (DOM) - MACIAS Luis (MEX)
September 11, 2014; 20:25	(19–25, 25–18, 25–20, 26–24)			(Poland) Atlas Arena, Łódź; Attendance: 11,800; Referees: RAMIREZ Yuri (DOM) - MACIAS Luis (MEX)

September 13, 2014; 20:25	Iran	2–3	Poland	(Poland) Atlas Arena, Łódź; Attendance: 12,050; Referees: MACIAS Luis (MEX) - LODERUS Frans (NED)
September 13, 2014; 20:25	(17–25, 16–25, 26–24, 25–19, 14–16)			(Poland) Atlas Arena, Łódź; Attendance: 12,050; Referees: MACIAS Luis (MEX) - LODERUS Frans (NED)

September 14, 2014; 20:25	Poland	3–2	France	(Poland) Atlas Arena, Łódź; Attendance: 12,100; Referees: LODERUS Frans (NED) - ALI Jafaar (BRN)
September 14, 2014; 20:25	(25–18, 21–25, 25–23, 22–25, 15–12)			(Poland) Atlas Arena, Łódź; Attendance: 12,100; Referees: LODERUS Frans (NED) - ALI Jafaar (BRN)

==== Pool H ====
September 16, 2014; 20:25	Poland	3–2	Brazil	(Poland) Atlas Arena, Łódź; Attendance: 12,100; Referees: SHAHMIRI Mohammad (IRI) - VEREECKE Philippe (FRA)
September 16, 2014; 20:25	(25–22, 22–25, 14–25, 25–18, 17–15)			(Poland) Atlas Arena, Łódź; Attendance: 12,100; Referees: SHAHMIRI Mohammad (IRI) - VEREECKE Philippe (FRA)

September 18, 2014; 20:25	Russia	2–3	Poland	(Poland) Atlas Arena, Łódź; Attendance: 12,100; Referees: LODERUS Frans (NED) - MACIAS Luis (MEX)
September 18, 2014; 20:25	(25–22, 25–22, 21–25, 22–25, 15–11)			(Poland) Atlas Arena, Łódź; Attendance: 12,100; Referees: LODERUS Frans (NED) - MACIAS Luis (MEX)

==== Semifinal ====
September 20, 2014; 20:25	Poland	3–1	Germany	(Poland) Spodek, Katowice; Attendance: 12,100; Referees: MOKRY Juraj (SVK) - SHAHMIRI Mohammad (IRI)
September 20, 2014; 20:25	(26–24, 28–26, 23–25, 25–21)			(Poland) Spodek, Katowice; Attendance: 12,100; Referees: MOKRY Juraj (SVK) - SHAHMIRI Mohammad (IRI)

==== Final ====
September 21, 2014; 20:25	Brazil	1–3	Poland	(Poland) Spodek, Katowice; Attendance: 12,528; Referees: LODERUS Frans (NED) - LABASTA Milan (CZE)
September 21, 2014; 20:25	(25–18, 22–25, 23–25, 22–25)			(Poland) Spodek, Katowice; Attendance: 12,528; Referees: LODERUS Frans (NED) - LABASTA Milan (CZE)

=== 2015 FIVB World League ===
==== Pool B ====
May 28, 2014; 20:25 Central European Summer Time (UTC+02:00)	Poland	3–0	Russia	(Poland) Ergo Arena, Gdańsk; Attendance: 8,200; Referees: Fabrizio SALTALIPPI (ITA) & Aziz YENER (TUR)
May 28, 2014; 20:25 Central European Summer Time (UTC+02:00)	(25–16, 25–17, 25–20) MVP: Mateusz Bieniek			(Poland) Ergo Arena, Gdańsk; Attendance: 8,200; Referees: Fabrizio SALTALIPPI (ITA) & Aziz YENER (TUR)

May 29, 2014; 20:25 Central European Summer Time (UTC+02:00)	Poland	3–2	Russia	(Poland) Ergo Arena, Gdańsk; Attendance: 9,000; Referees: Aziz YENER (TUR) & Fabrizio SALTALIPPI (ITA)
May 29, 2014; 20:25 Central European Summer Time (UTC+02:00)	(25–19, 24–26, 20–25, 25–19, 18–16) MVP: Bartosz Kurek			(Poland) Ergo Arena, Gdańsk; Attendance: 9,000; Referees: Aziz YENER (TUR) & Fabrizio SALTALIPPI (ITA)

June 5, 2014; 20:25 Central European Summer Time (UTC+02:00)	Poland	3–1	Iran	(Poland) Hala Sportowa, Częstochowa; Attendance: 6,159; Referees: Goran GRADINSKI (SRB) & Juraj MOKRY (SVK)
June 5, 2014; 20:25 Central European Summer Time (UTC+02:00)	(25–20, 25–22, 21–25, 27–25) MVP: Bartosz Kurek			(Poland) Hala Sportowa, Częstochowa; Attendance: 6,159; Referees: Goran GRADINSKI (SRB) & Juraj MOKRY (SVK)

June 6, 2014; 20:25 Central European Summer Time (UTC+02:00)	Poland	3–2	Iran	(Poland) Hala Sportowa, Częstochowa; Attendance: 6,162; Referees: Juraj MOKRY (SVK) & Goran GRADINSKI (SRB)
June 6, 2014; 20:25 Central European Summer Time (UTC+02:00)	(22–25, 25–22, 25–16, 22–25, 15–6) MVP: Michał Kubiak			(Poland) Hala Sportowa, Częstochowa; Attendance: 6,162; Referees: Juraj MOKRY (SVK) & Goran GRADINSKI (SRB)

June 12, 2014; 19:10 Central Time Zone (UTC−05:00) (In Poland 2:10)	United States	3–2	Poland	(United States) Sears Centre, Hoffman Estates; Attendance: 9,574; Referees: Hernan CASAMIQUELA (ARG) & Rogerio ESPICALSKI (BRA)
June 12, 2014; 19:10 Central Time Zone (UTC−05:00) (In Poland 2:10)	(23–25, 25–23, 19–25, 25–22, 15–9)			(United States) Sears Centre, Hoffman Estates; Attendance: 9,574; Referees: Hernan CASAMIQUELA (ARG) & Rogerio ESPICALSKI (BRA)

June 13, 2014; 19:10 Central Time Zone (UTC−05:00) (In Poland 2:10)	United States	3–1	Poland	(United States) Sears Centre, Hoffman Estates; Attendance: 10,000; Referees: Rogerio ESPICALSKI (BRA) & Hernan CASAMIQUELA (ARG)
June 13, 2014; 19:10 Central Time Zone (UTC−05:00) (In Poland 2:10)	(23–25, 25–23, 25–15, 25–17)			(United States) Sears Centre, Hoffman Estates; Attendance: 10,000; Referees: Rogerio ESPICALSKI (BRA) & Hernan CASAMIQUELA (ARG)

June 19, 2014; 18:10 Further-eastern European Time (UTC+03:00) (In Poland 17:10)	Russia	1–3	Poland	(Russia) Kazan Volleyball Centre, Kazan; Attendance: 4,010; Referees: MOKRY Juraj (SVK) & PASQUALI Fabrizio (ITA)
June 19, 2014; 18:10 Further-eastern European Time (UTC+03:00) (In Poland 17:10)	(32–30, 14–25, 22–25, 18–25)			(Russia) Kazan Volleyball Centre, Kazan; Attendance: 4,010; Referees: MOKRY Juraj (SVK) & PASQUALI Fabrizio (ITA)

June 20, 2014; 18:10 Further-eastern European Time (UTC+03:00) (In Poland 17:10)	Russia	2–3	Poland	(Russia) Kazan Volleyball Centre, Kazan; Attendance: 4,100; Referees: PASQUALI Fabrizio (ITA) & MOKRY Juraj (SVK)
June 20, 2014; 18:10 Further-eastern European Time (UTC+03:00) (In Poland 17:10)	(25–19, 21–25, 24–26, 25–20, 14–16)			(Russia) Kazan Volleyball Centre, Kazan; Attendance: 4,100; Referees: PASQUALI Fabrizio (ITA) & MOKRY Juraj (SVK)

June 26, 2014; 21:00 Iran Daylight Time (UTC+04:30) (In Poland 18:30)	Iran	3–2	Poland	(Iran) Azadi Indoor Stadium, Tehran; Attendance: 12,000; Referees: Jafar Ali (BRN) & Anderson Cacador (BRA)
June 26, 2014; 21:00 Iran Daylight Time (UTC+04:30) (In Poland 18:30)	(25–21, 23–25, 21–25, 25–16, 15–11)			(Iran) Azadi Indoor Stadium, Tehran; Attendance: 12,000; Referees: Jafar Ali (BRN) & Anderson Cacador (BRA)

June 28, 2014; 21:00 Iran Daylight Time (UTC+04:30) (In Poland 18:30)	Iran	1–3	Poland	(Iran) Azadi Indoor Stadium, Tehran; Attendance: 12,000; Referees: Anderson Cacador (BRA) & Jafar Ali (BRN)
June 28, 2014; 21:00 Iran Daylight Time (UTC+04:30) (In Poland 18:30)	(25–23, 20–25, 20–25, 19–25)			(Iran) Azadi Indoor Stadium, Tehran; Attendance: 12,000; Referees: Anderson Cacador (BRA) & Jafar Ali (BRN)

July 3, 2014; 20:25 Central European Summer Time (UTC+02:00)	Poland	3–2	United States	(Poland) Tauron Arena, Kraków; Attendance: 14,248; Referees: Simone Santi (ITA) & Paulo TURCI (BRA)
July 3, 2014; 20:25 Central European Summer Time (UTC+02:00)	(19–25, 25–22, 21–25, 25–20, 15–12) MVP: Fabian Drzyzga			(Poland) Tauron Arena, Kraków; Attendance: 14,248; Referees: Simone Santi (ITA) & Paulo TURCI (BRA)

July 4, 2014; 20:25 Central European Summer Time (UTC+02:00)	Poland	1–3	United States	(Poland) Tauron Arena, Kraków; Attendance: 14,339; Referees: Paulo TURCI (BRA) & Simone SANTI (ITA)
July 4, 2014; 20:25 Central European Summer Time (UTC+02:00)	(20–25, 21–25, 25–22, 23–25) MVP: Thomas Jaeschke			(Poland) Tauron Arena, Kraków; Attendance: 14,339; Referees: Paulo TURCI (BRA) & Simone SANTI (ITA)

==== Final round ====
- All times are Brasília Time (UTC−03:00).

===== Pool J =====
July 16, 2015; 17:00 (In Poland 22:00)	Poland	3–1	Italy	(Brazil) Ginásio do Maracanãzinho, Rio de Janeiro; Attendance: 3,220; Referees: MOKRY Juraj (SVK) & SHAABAN Nasr (EGY)
July 16, 2015; 17:00 (In Poland 22:00)	(25–15, 27–25, 20–25, 25–20)			(Brazil) Ginásio do Maracanãzinho, Rio de Janeiro; Attendance: 3,220; Referees: MOKRY Juraj (SVK) & SHAABAN Nasr (EGY)

July 17, 2015; 17:00 (In Poland 22:00)	Serbia	3–2	Poland	(Brazil) Ginásio do Maracanãzinho, Rio de Janeiro; Attendance: 2,760; Referees: CASAMIQUELA, Hernan (ARG) & TURCI, Paulo (BRA) (+ SHAABAN Nasr (EGY) because of Turci's fainting)
July 17, 2015; 17:00 (In Poland 22:00)	(18–25, 25–22, 22–25, 25–22, 15–13)			(Brazil) Ginásio do Maracanãzinho, Rio de Janeiro; Attendance: 2,760; Referees: CASAMIQUELA, Hernan (ARG) & TURCI, Paulo (BRA) (+ SHAABAN Nasr (EGY) because of Turci's fainting)

===== Semifinal =====
July 18, 2015; 12:05 (In Poland 17:05)	France	3–2	Poland	(Brazil) Ginásio do Maracanãzinho, Rio de Janeiro; Attendance: 2,347; Referees: MOKRY, Juraj (SVK) & ZENOVICH, Andrey (RUS)
July 18, 2015; 12:05 (In Poland 17:05)	(25–23, 25–23, 19–25, 22–25, 17–15)			(Brazil) Ginásio do Maracanãzinho, Rio de Janeiro; Attendance: 2,347; Referees: MOKRY, Juraj (SVK) & ZENOVICH, Andrey (RUS)

===== 3rd place =====
July 19, 2015; 9:10 (In Poland 14:10)	United States	3–0	Poland	(Brazil) Ginásio do Maracanãzinho, Rio de Janeiro; Attendance: 4,784; Referees: MURANAKA, Shin (JPN) & SHAABAN, Nasr (EGY)
July 19, 2015; 9:10 (In Poland 14:10)	(25–22, 25–23, 25–23)			(Brazil) Ginásio do Maracanãzinho, Rio de Janeiro; Attendance: 4,784; Referees: MURANAKA, Shin (JPN) & SHAABAN, Nasr (EGY)

=== 2015 FIVB World Cup ===
- All times are Japan Standard Time (UTC+09:00).

==== First round (Site B) ====
September 8, 2015; 18:40 (In Poland 11:40)	Poland	3–0	Tunisia	(Japan) Hamamatsu Arena, Hamamatsu; Attendance: 810; Referees: ILKIW Taras (CAN) & SALTALIPPI Fabrizio (ITA)
September 8, 2015; 18:40 (In Poland 11:40)	(25–17, 25–15, 25–20) MVP: Bartosz Kurek			(Japan) Hamamatsu Arena, Hamamatsu; Attendance: 810; Referees: ILKIW Taras (CAN) & SALTALIPPI Fabrizio (ITA)

September 9, 2015; 18:40 (In Poland 11:40)	Poland	3–1	Russia	(Japan) Hamamatsu Arena, Hamamatsu; Attendance: 2,590; Referees: SHAABAN Nasr (EGY) & YENER Aziz (TUR)
September 9, 2015; 18:40 (In Poland 11:40)	(26–28, 27–25, 25–19, 25–22) MVP: Bartosz Kurek			(Japan) Hamamatsu Arena, Hamamatsu; Attendance: 2,590; Referees: SHAABAN Nasr (EGY) & YENER Aziz (TUR)

September 10, 2015; 15:10 (In Poland 08:10)	Argentina	1–3	Poland	(Japan) Hamamatsu Arena, Hamamatsu; Attendance: 1,460; Referees: SHAABAN Nasr (EGY) & MOKRY Juraj (SVK)
September 10, 2015; 15:10 (In Poland 08:10)	(18–25, 25–19, 21–25, 25–27) MVP: Michał Kubiak			(Japan) Hamamatsu Arena, Hamamatsu; Attendance: 1,460; Referees: SHAABAN Nasr (EGY) & MOKRY Juraj (SVK)

September 12, 2015; 12:10 (In Poland 05:10)	Poland	3–2	Iran	(Japan) Hamamatsu Arena, Hamamatsu; Attendance: 2,900; Referees: ALBRIGHT Paul (USA) & ILKIW Taras (CAN)
September 12, 2015; 12:10 (In Poland 05:10)	(25–18, 25–23, 15–25, 20–25, 11–15) MVP: Mateusz Mika			(Japan) Hamamatsu Arena, Hamamatsu; Attendance: 2,900; Referees: ALBRIGHT Paul (USA) & ILKIW Taras (CAN)

September 13, 2015; 12:10 (In Poland 05:10)	Venezuela	1–3	Poland	(Japan) Hamamatsu Arena, Hamamatsu; Attendance: 2,260; Referees: SHAABAN Nasr (EGY) & ALBRIGHT Paul (USA)
September 13, 2015; 12:10 (In Poland 05:10)	(27–25, 23–25, 16–25, 23–25) MVP: Dawid Konarski			(Japan) Hamamatsu Arena, Hamamatsu; Attendance: 2,260; Referees: SHAABAN Nasr (EGY) & ALBRIGHT Paul (USA)

==== Second round (Site B) ====
September 16, 2015; 15:10 (In Poland 08:10)	Canada	1–3	Poland	(Japan) Toyama City Gymnasium, Toyama; Attendance: 1,750; Referees: SHAHMIRI Mohammad (IRI) & ALBRIGHT Paul (USA)
September 16, 2015; 15:10 (In Poland 08:10)	(25–23, 15–25, 19–25, 19–25) MVP: Bartosz Kurek			(Japan) Toyama City Gymnasium, Toyama; Attendance: 1,750; Referees: SHAHMIRI Mohammad (IRI) & ALBRIGHT Paul (USA)

September 17, 2015; 12:10 (In Poland 05:10)	Egypt	0–3	Poland	(Japan) Toyama City Gymnasium, Toyama; Attendance: 1,050; Referees: ALBRIGHT Paul (USA) & SALTALIPPI Fabrizio (ITA)
September 17, 2015; 12:10 (In Poland 05:10)	(20–25, 23–25, 18–25) MVP: Michał Kubiak			(Japan) Toyama City Gymnasium, Toyama; Attendance: 1,050; Referees: ALBRIGHT Paul (USA) & SALTALIPPI Fabrizio (ITA)

September 18, 2015; 19:10 (In Poland 12:10)	Australia	0–3	Poland	(Japan) Toyama City Gymnasium, Toyama; Attendance: 1,930; Referees: SHAHMIRI Mohammad (IRI) & LIU Jiang (CHN)
September 18, 2015; 19:10 (In Poland 12:10)	(15–25, 22–25, 17–25) MVP: Bartosz Kurek			(Japan) Toyama City Gymnasium, Toyama; Attendance: 1,930; Referees: SHAHMIRI Mohammad (IRI) & LIU Jiang (CHN)

==== Third round (Site A) ====
September 21, 2015; 17:10 (In Poland 10:10)	United States	1–3	Poland	(Japan) Yoyogi National Gymnasium, Tokyo; Attendance: 9,700; Referees: MOKRY Juraj (SVK) & ILKIW Taras (CAN)
September 21, 2015; 17:10 (In Poland 10:10)	(25–17, 19–25, 23–25, 15–25) MVP: Mateusz Bieniek			(Japan) Yoyogi National Gymnasium, Tokyo; Attendance: 9,700; Referees: MOKRY Juraj (SVK) & ILKIW Taras (CAN)

September 22, 2015; 14:15 (In Poland 07:15)	Japan	1–3	Poland	(Japan) Yoyogi National Gymnasium, Tokyo; Attendance: 12,000; Referees: YENER Aziz (TUR) & MOKRY Juraj (SVK)
September 22, 2015; 14:15 (In Poland 07:15)	(26–24, 25–27, 21–25, 19–25)			(Japan) Yoyogi National Gymnasium, Tokyo; Attendance: 12,000; Referees: YENER Aziz (TUR) & MOKRY Juraj (SVK)

September 23, 2015; 11:10 (In Poland 03:30)	Italy	3–1	Poland	(Japan) Yoyogi National Gymnasium, Tokyo; Attendance: 5,800; Referees: MOKRY Juraj (SVK) & SHAABAN Nasr (EGY)
September 23, 2015; 11:10 (In Poland 03:30)	(26–24, 22–25, 25–22, 25–19)			(Japan) Yoyogi National Gymnasium, Tokyo; Attendance: 5,800; Referees: MOKRY Juraj (SVK) & SHAABAN Nasr (EGY)

=== 2015 European Championship ===
- All times are Eastern European Summer Time (UTC+03:00).

==== Pool C ====
October 9, 2015; 20:30 (In Poland 19:30)	Poland	3–0	Belgium	(Bulgaria) Palace of Culture and Sports, Varna; Attendance: 700; Referees: HODON Dusan (SVK) - ZENOVICH Andrey (RUS)
October 9, 2015; 20:30 (In Poland 19:30)	(25–18, 29–27, 25–16)			(Bulgaria) Palace of Culture and Sports, Varna; Attendance: 700; Referees: HODON Dusan (SVK) - ZENOVICH Andrey (RUS)

October 10, 2015; 20:30 (In Poland 19:30)	Slovenia	1–3	Poland	(Bulgaria) Palace of Culture and Sports, Varna; Attendance: 1,000; Referees: ZENOVICH Andrey (RUS) - ADLER Laszlo (HUN)
October 10, 2015; 20:30 (In Poland 19:30)	(21–25, 30–28, 26–28, 13–25)			(Bulgaria) Palace of Culture and Sports, Varna; Attendance: 1,000; Referees: ZENOVICH Andrey (RUS) - ADLER Laszlo (HUN)

October 11, 2015; 18:00 (In Poland 17:00)	Belarus	0–3	Poland	(Bulgaria) Palace of Culture and Sports, Varna; Attendance: 500; Referees: SIMONOVSKA Sonja (MNE) - ADLER Laszlo (HUN)
October 11, 2015; 18:00 (In Poland 17:00)	(13–25, 19–25, 17–25)			(Bulgaria) Palace of Culture and Sports, Varna; Attendance: 500; Referees: SIMONOVSKA Sonja (MNE) - ADLER Laszlo (HUN)

==== Quarterfinal ====
October 14, 2015; 16:45 (In Poland 17:45)	Poland	2–3	Slovenia	(Bulgaria) Arena Armeec, Sofia; Attendance: 1,200; Referees: PASQUALI Fabrizio (ITA) - YENER Aziz (TUR)
October 14, 2015; 16:45 (In Poland 17:45)	(17–25, 19–25, 25–23, 25–19, 14–16)			(Bulgaria) Arena Armeec, Sofia; Attendance: 1,200; Referees: PASQUALI Fabrizio (ITA) - YENER Aziz (TUR)

=== 2016 Summer Olympics – European qualification ===
- All times are Central European Time (UTC+01:00).

==== Pool A ====
January 5, 2016; 20:30	Serbia	1–3	Poland	(Germany) Max-Schmeling-Halle, Berlin; Attendance: 3,300; Referees: ZENOVICH Andrey (RUS) - NASTASE Lucian-Vasile (ROM)
January 5, 2016; 20:30	(25–22, 18–25, 23–25, 21–25)			(Germany) Max-Schmeling-Halle, Berlin; Attendance: 3,300; Referees: ZENOVICH Andrey (RUS) - NASTASE Lucian-Vasile (ROM)

January 7, 2016; 15:00	Poland	3–0	Belgium	(Germany) Max-Schmeling-Halle, Berlin; Attendance: 2,300; Referees: AKINCI Erdal (TUR) - PASQUALI Fabrizio (ITA)
January 7, 2016; 15:00	(25–20, 30–28, 25–19)			(Germany) Max-Schmeling-Halle, Berlin; Attendance: 2,300; Referees: AKINCI Erdal (TUR) - PASQUALI Fabrizio (ITA)

January 8, 2016; 20:00	Poland	2–3	Germany	(Germany) Max-Schmeling-Halle, Berlin; Referees: NASTASE Lucian-Vasile (ROM) - SIMONOVIC Vladimir (SRB)
January 8, 2016; 20:00	(25–21, 17–25, 22–25, 25–20, 10–15)			(Germany) Max-Schmeling-Halle, Berlin; Referees: NASTASE Lucian-Vasile (ROM) - SIMONOVIC Vladimir (SRB)

==== Semifinal ====
January 9, 2016; 19:35	France	3–0	Poland	(Germany) Max-Schmeling-Halle, Berlin; Attendance: 7,200; Referees: SIMONOVIC Vladimir (SRB) - RAJKOVIC Milan (CRO)
January 9, 2016; 19:35	(29–27, 32–30, 25–20)			(Germany) Max-Schmeling-Halle, Berlin; Attendance: 7,200; Referees: SIMONOVIC Vladimir (SRB) - RAJKOVIC Milan (CRO)

==== 3rd place match ====
January 10, 2016; 13:35	Poland	3–2	Germany	(Germany) Max-Schmeling-Halle, Berlin; Attendance: 7,200; Referees: ZENOVICH Andrey (RUS) - GEROTHODOROS Epaminondas (GRE)
January 10, 2016; 13:35	(20–25, 25–22, 16–25, 28–26, 16–14)			(Germany) Max-Schmeling-Halle, Berlin; Attendance: 7,200; Referees: ZENOVICH Andrey (RUS) - GEROTHODOROS Epaminondas (GRE)

=== 2016 World Olympic Qualification Tournament ===
- All times are Japan Standard Time (UTC+09:00).

==== World qualification ====
28 May 2016; 15:40	Poland	3–2	Canada	(Japan) Tokyo Metropolitan Gymnasium, Tokyo; Attendance: 4,500; Referees: Paulo TURCI (BRA) & H.G.CASAMIQUELA (ARG)
28 May 2016; 15:40	(25–18, 17–25, 25–21, 18–25, 15–9)			(Japan) Tokyo Metropolitan Gymnasium, Tokyo; Attendance: 4,500; Referees: Paulo TURCI (BRA) & H.G.CASAMIQUELA (ARG)

29 May 2016; 15:40	France	2–3	Poland	(Japan) Tokyo Metropolitan Gymnasium, Tokyo; Attendance: 5,000; Referees: Juraj MOKRY (SVK) & V.SIMONOVIC (SRB)
29 May 2016; 15:40	(25–22, 25–13, 29–31, 17–25, 12–15)			(Japan) Tokyo Metropolitan Gymnasium, Tokyo; Attendance: 5,000; Referees: Juraj MOKRY (SVK) & V.SIMONOVIC (SRB)

31 May 2016; 19:20	Poland	3–0	Japan	(Japan) Tokyo Metropolitan Gymnasium, Tokyo; Attendance: 10,000; Referees: Nasr SHAABAN (EGY) & H.G.CASAMIQUELA (ARG)
31 May 2016; 19:20	(25–22, 25–16, 25–23)			(Japan) Tokyo Metropolitan Gymnasium, Tokyo; Attendance: 10,000; Referees: Nasr SHAABAN (EGY) & H.G.CASAMIQUELA (ARG)

1 June 2016; 15:40	China	2–3	Poland	(Japan) Tokyo Metropolitan Gymnasium, Tokyo; Attendance: 3,500; Referees: D.F.C LASSI (DOM) & Paulo TURCI (BRA)
1 June 2016; 15:40	(28–26, 25–20, 16–25, 17–25, 10–15)			(Japan) Tokyo Metropolitan Gymnasium, Tokyo; Attendance: 3,500; Referees: D.F.C LASSI (DOM) & Paulo TURCI (BRA)

2 June 2016; 15:40	Poland	3–0	Venezuela	(Japan) Tokyo Metropolitan Gymnasium, Tokyo; Attendance: 3,500; Referees: Shin MURANAKA (JPN) & Fabrizio PASQUALI (ITA)
2 June 2016; 15:40	(25–21, 25–17, 25–18)			(Japan) Tokyo Metropolitan Gymnasium, Tokyo; Attendance: 3,500; Referees: Shin MURANAKA (JPN) & Fabrizio PASQUALI (ITA)

4 June 2016; 15:40	Poland	1–3	Iran	(Japan) Tokyo Metropolitan Gymnasium, Tokyo; Attendance: 4,600; Referees: H.G.CASAMIQUELA (ARG) & D.F.C LASSI (DOM)
4 June 2016; 15:40	(20–25, 18–25, 25–20, 32–34)			(Japan) Tokyo Metropolitan Gymnasium, Tokyo; Attendance: 4,600; Referees: H.G.CASAMIQUELA (ARG) & D.F.C LASSI (DOM)

5 June 2016; 15:40	Australia	0–3	Poland	(Japan) Tokyo Metropolitan Gymnasium, Tokyo; Attendance: 5,800; Referees: Paulo TURCI (BRA) & Nasr SHAABAN (EGY)
5 June 2016; 15:40	(21–25, 15–25, 25–27)			(Japan) Tokyo Metropolitan Gymnasium, Tokyo; Attendance: 5,800; Referees: Paulo TURCI (BRA) & Nasr SHAABAN (EGY)

=== 2016 FIVB World League ===
==== Intercontinental round ====
===== Pool C1 =====
17 June 2016; 16:40 Central European Summer Time (UTC+02:00)	Bulgaria	1–3	Poland	(Russia) DS Yantarny, Kaliningrad; Attendance: 1,415; Referees: SALTALIPPI Fabrizio (ITA) & BOUDAYA Taoufik (TUN)
17 June 2016; 16:40 Central European Summer Time (UTC+02:00)	(25–19, 19–25, 17–25, 20–25)			(Russia) DS Yantarny, Kaliningrad; Attendance: 1,415; Referees: SALTALIPPI Fabrizio (ITA) & BOUDAYA Taoufik (TUN)

18 June 2016; 19:10 Central European Summer Time (UTC+02:00)	Russia	3–0	Poland	(Russia) DS Yantarny, Kaliningrad; Attendance: 6,910; Referees: SHAHMIRI Mohammad (IRI) & SALTALIPPI Fabrizio (ITA)
18 June 2016; 19:10 Central European Summer Time (UTC+02:00)	(25–22, 25–19, 25–22)			(Russia) DS Yantarny, Kaliningrad; Attendance: 6,910; Referees: SHAHMIRI Mohammad (IRI) & SALTALIPPI Fabrizio (ITA)

19 June 2016; 16:40 Central European Summer Time (UTC+02:00)	Serbia	3–0	Poland	(Russia) DS Yantarny, Kaliningrad; Attendance: 1,345; Referees: SHAHMIRI Mohammad (IRI) & BOUDAYA Taoufik (TUN)
19 June 2016; 16:40 Central European Summer Time (UTC+02:00)	(25–20, 25–20, 25–23)			(Russia) DS Yantarny, Kaliningrad; Attendance: 1,345; Referees: SHAHMIRI Mohammad (IRI) & BOUDAYA Taoufik (TUN)

===== Pool D1 =====
24 June 2016; 20:10 Central European Summer Time (UTC+02:00)	Poland	3–1	Argentina	(Poland) Atlas Arena, Łódź; Attendance: 4,000; Referees: SIMONOVIC Vladimir (SRB) & MACIAS Luis Gerardo (MEX)
24 June 2016; 20:10 Central European Summer Time (UTC+02:00)	(26–24, 31–29, 36–38, 25–22)			(Poland) Atlas Arena, Łódź; Attendance: 4,000; Referees: SIMONOVIC Vladimir (SRB) & MACIAS Luis Gerardo (MEX)

25 June 2016; 20:10 Central European Summer Time (UTC+02:00)	Poland	1–3	Russia	(Poland) Atlas Arena, Łódź; Attendance: 9,800; Referees: TURCI Paolo (BRA) & SIMONOVIC Vladimir (SRB)
25 June 2016; 20:10 Central European Summer Time (UTC+02:00)	(17–25, 20–25, 25–20, 15–25)			(Poland) Atlas Arena, Łódź; Attendance: 9,800; Referees: TURCI Paolo (BRA) & SIMONOVIC Vladimir (SRB)

26 June 2016; 18:10 Central European Summer Time (UTC+02:00)	Poland	0–3	France	(Poland) Atlas Arena, Łódź; Attendance: 7,000; Referees: PASQUALI Fabrizio (ITA) & TURCI Paolo (BRA)
26 June 2016; 18:10 Central European Summer Time (UTC+02:00)	(28–30, 20–25, 29–31)			(Poland) Atlas Arena, Łódź; Attendance: 7,000; Referees: PASQUALI Fabrizio (ITA) & TURCI Paolo (BRA)

===== Pool G1 =====
1 July 2016; 15:00 Central European Summer Time (UTC+02:00)	Brazil	3–0	Poland	(France) Palais des Sports Jean Weille, Nancy; Attendance: 1,800; Referees: RAPISARDA Daniele (ITA) & MUNARAKA Shin (JPN)
1 July 2016; 15:00 Central European Summer Time (UTC+02:00)	(30–28, 25–21, 25–16)			(France) Palais des Sports Jean Weille, Nancy; Attendance: 1,800; Referees: RAPISARDA Daniele (ITA) & MUNARAKA Shin (JPN)

2 July 2016; 18:00 Central European Summer Time (UTC+02:00)	France	3–1	Poland	(France) Palais des Sports Jean Weille, Nancy; Attendance: 4,330; Referees: MURANAKA Shin (JPN) & RAPISARDA Daniele (ITA)
2 July 2016; 18:00 Central European Summer Time (UTC+02:00)	(22–25, 30–28, 25–22, 25–19)			(France) Palais des Sports Jean Weille, Nancy; Attendance: 4,330; Referees: MURANAKA Shin (JPN) & RAPISARDA Daniele (ITA)

3 July 2016; 15:00 Central European Summer Time (UTC+02:00)	Belgium	2–3	Poland	(France) Palais des Sports Jean Weille, Nancy; Attendance: 4,470; Referees: MURANAKA Shin (JPN) & HARIZ Abderrazek (TUN)
3 July 2016; 15:00 Central European Summer Time (UTC+02:00)	(25–19, 23–25, 22–25, 25–20, 13–15)			(France) Palais des Sports Jean Weille, Nancy; Attendance: 4,470; Referees: MURANAKA Shin (JPN) & HARIZ Abderrazek (TUN)

==== Final round ====
===== Pool K1 =====
13 July 2016; 20:30	Poland	3–2	France	(Poland) Tauron Arena, Kraków; Attendance: 4,240; Referees: Andrey ZENOVICH (RUS) & Nasr SHAABAN (EGY)
13 July 2016; 20:30	(21–25, 17–25, 25–17, 28–26, 15–12)			(Poland) Tauron Arena, Kraków; Attendance: 4,240; Referees: Andrey ZENOVICH (RUS) & Nasr SHAABAN (EGY)

14 July 2016; 20:30	Poland	1–3	Serbia	(Poland) Tauron Arena, Kraków; Attendance: 5,360; Referees: Luis MACIAS (MEX) & Ibrahim AL. NAAMA (QAT)
14 July 2016; 20:30	(23–25, 20–25, 25–18, 18–25)			(Poland) Tauron Arena, Kraków; Attendance: 5,360; Referees: Luis MACIAS (MEX) & Ibrahim AL. NAAMA (QAT)

=== 2016 Olympic Games ===
- All times are Brasília Time (UTC−03:00).

==== Group B ====
7 August 2016; 15:00	Poland	3–0	Egypt	(Brazil) Ginásio do Maracanãzinho, Rio de Janeiro; Attendance: 5,658; Referees: Juraj Mokrý (SVK), Susana Rodríguez (ESP)
7 August 2016; 15:00	(25–18, 25–20, 25–17)			(Brazil) Ginásio do Maracanãzinho, Rio de Janeiro; Attendance: 5,658; Referees: Juraj Mokrý (SVK), Susana Rodríguez (ESP)

9 August 2016; 17:05	Poland	3–2	Iran	(Brazil) Ginásio do Maracanãzinho, Rio de Janeiro; Attendance: 7,227; Referees: Paulo Turci (BRA), Susana Rodríguez (ESP)
9 August 2016; 17:05	(25–17, 25–23, 23–25, 20–25, 18–16)			(Brazil) Ginásio do Maracanãzinho, Rio de Janeiro; Attendance: 7,227; Referees: Paulo Turci (BRA), Susana Rodríguez (ESP)

11 August 2016; 15:00	Poland	3–0	Argentina	(Brazil) Ginásio do Maracanãzinho, Rio de Janeiro; Attendance: 6,972; Referees: Denny Cespedes (DOM), Rogerio Espicalsky(BRA)
11 August 2016; 15:00	(25–21, 25–19, 37–35)			(Brazil) Ginásio do Maracanãzinho, Rio de Janeiro; Attendance: 6,972; Referees: Denny Cespedes (DOM), Rogerio Espicalsky(BRA)

13 August 2016; 15:00	Poland	2–3	Russia	(Brazil) Ginásio do Maracanãzinho, Rio de Janeiro; Attendance: 7,239; Referees: Fabrizio Pasquali (ITA), Juraj Mokrý (SVK)
13 August 2016; 15:00	(18–25, 25–16, 18–25, 25–22, 13–15)			(Brazil) Ginásio do Maracanãzinho, Rio de Janeiro; Attendance: 7,239; Referees: Fabrizio Pasquali (ITA), Juraj Mokrý (SVK)

15 August 2016; 17:05	Poland	3–0	Cuba	(Brazil) Ginásio do Maracanãzinho, Rio de Janeiro; Attendance: 8,175; Referees: Mohammad Shahmiri (IRI), Hernán Casamiquela (ARG)
15 August 2016; 17:05	(25–18, 25–15, 25–17)			(Brazil) Ginásio do Maracanãzinho, Rio de Janeiro; Attendance: 8,175; Referees: Mohammad Shahmiri (IRI), Hernán Casamiquela (ARG)

==== Quarterfinal ====
17 August 2016; 14:00	Poland	0–3	United States	(Brazil) Ginásio do Maracanãzinho, Rio de Janeiro; Attendance: 8,278; Referees: Fabrizio Pasquali (ITA) Andrey Zenovich (RUS)
17 August 2016; 14:00	(23–25, 22–25, 20–25)			(Brazil) Ginásio do Maracanãzinho, Rio de Janeiro; Attendance: 8,278; Referees: Fabrizio Pasquali (ITA) Andrey Zenovich (RUS)

== Friendly matches ==
=== 2014 Memoriał Huberta Jerzego Wagnera ===
August 16, 2014; 20:30	Poland	2–3	Bulgaria	(Poland) Kraków Arena, Kraków; Referees: MAROSZEK Wojciech (POL) - DUDEK Piotr (POL)
August 16, 2014; 20:30	(25–20, 23–25, 27–29, 26–24, 13–15)			(Poland) Kraków Arena, Kraków; Referees: MAROSZEK Wojciech (POL) - DUDEK Piotr (POL)

August 17, 2014; 20:30	Poland	3–0	China	(Poland) Kraków Arena, Kraków; Referees: MAROSZEK Wojciech (POL) - DUDEK Piotr (POL)
August 17, 2014; 20:30	(25–18, 25–22, 25–17)			(Poland) Kraków Arena, Kraków; Referees: MAROSZEK Wojciech (POL) - DUDEK Piotr (POL)

August 18, 2014; 20:30	Poland	3–2	Russia	(Poland) Kraków Arena, Kraków; Referees: DUDEK Piotr (POL) - JASIŃSKI Dariusz (POL)
August 18, 2014; 20:30	(22–25, 26–24, 20–25, 26–24, 15–9)			(Poland) Kraków Arena, Kraków; Referees: DUDEK Piotr (POL) - JASIŃSKI Dariusz (POL)

=== 2015 Memoriał Huberta Jerzego Wagnera ===
August 22, 2015; 20:30	Poland	3–0	Japan	(Poland) Hala Sportowo-Widowiskowa, Toruń; Attendance: 6,000; Referees: PINDRAL Szymon (POL) - SOKÓŁ Katarzyna (POL)
August 22, 2015; 20:30	(28–26, 25–15, 25–18)			(Poland) Hala Sportowo-Widowiskowa, Toruń; Attendance: 6,000; Referees: PINDRAL Szymon (POL) - SOKÓŁ Katarzyna (POL)

August 23, 2015; 19:30	Poland	3–1	Iran	(Poland) Hala Sportowo-Widowiskowa, Toruń; Attendance: 6,000; Referees: TWARDOWSKI Maciej (POL) - PINDRAL Szymon (POL)
August 23, 2015; 19:30	(25–23, 18–25, 25–15, 25–20)			(Poland) Hala Sportowo-Widowiskowa, Toruń; Attendance: 6,000; Referees: TWARDOWSKI Maciej (POL) - PINDRAL Szymon (POL)

August 24, 2015; 20:30	Poland	3–2	France	(Poland) Hala Sportowo-Widowiskowa, Toruń; Attendance: 6,000; Referees: MAKOWSKI Jarosław (POL) - PINDRAL Szymon (POL)
August 24, 2015; 20:30	(25–27, 19–25, 26–24, 25–23, 15–13)			(Poland) Hala Sportowo-Widowiskowa, Toruń; Attendance: 6,000; Referees: MAKOWSKI Jarosław (POL) - PINDRAL Szymon (POL)

=== 2016 Memoriał Huberta Jerzego Wagnera ===
17 May 2016; 20:30	Poland	2–3	Bulgaria	(Poland) Tauron Arena, Kraków
17 May 2016; 20:30	(21–25, 25–21, 21–25, 26–24, 12–15)			(Poland) Tauron Arena, Kraków

18 May 2016; 20:30	Poland	3–1	Belgium	(Poland) Tauron Arena, Kraków
18 May 2016; 20:30	(20–25, 25–16, 25–20, 25–22)			(Poland) Tauron Arena, Kraków

19 May 2016; 20:30	Poland	2–3	Serbia	(Poland) Tauron Arena, Kraków
19 May 2016; 20:30	(25–17, 25–22, 18–25, 19–25, 11–15)			(Poland) Tauron Arena, Kraków
