= Pablo Baeza =

Chilean handball player (born 1988)

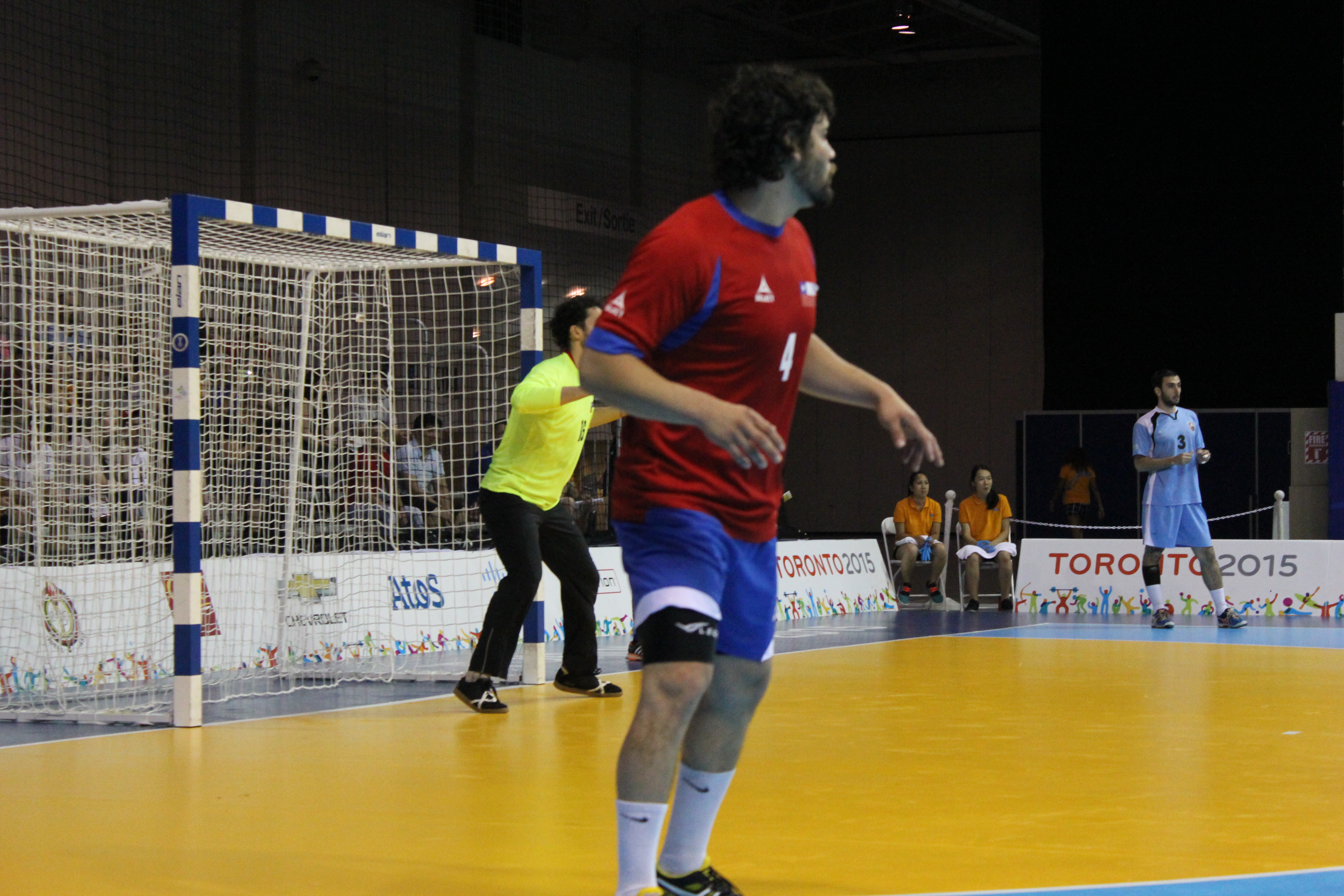

Personal information
- Full name: Pablo Andrés Baeza González
- Born: 11 November 1988 (age 37) Cerro Navia, Santiago, Chile
- Height: 1.78 m (5 ft 10 in)

Sport
- Sport: Handball
- Position: Right wing

Senior clubs
- Years: Team
- 2006–2007: Instituto Nacional
- 2007–2008: Maristas Algemesí
- 2008–2009: HC Eivissa
- 2010–2021: USAB
National team
Years	Team	Apps	(Gls)
–	Chile	13	(30)
Medal record
Pan American Games
Bronze medal – third place	2015 Toronto	Team
Pan American Championship
Silver medal – second place	2016 Argentina
Bronze medal – third place	2018 Greenland
South American Games
Bronze medal – third place	2018 Cochabamba	Team
Bolivarian Games
Gold medal – first place	2017 Santa Marta

Pablo Andrés Baeza González (born 11 November 1988) is a Chilean handball player for the Chilean national team.

He participated at the 2017 World Men's Handball Championship.
