= 2020 South and Central American Men's Handball Championship =

Tournament details
- Host country: Brazil
- Venue(s): 3 (in 1 host city)
- Dates: 21–25 January
- Teams: 6 (from 1 confederation)

Final positions
- Champions: Argentina (1st title)
- Runner-up: Brazil
- Third place: Uruguay
- Fourth place: Chile

Tournament statistics
- Matches played: 15
- Goals scored: 894 (59.6 per match)
- Top scorer(s): (Argentina) Ignacio Pizarro (35 goals)

The 2020 South and Central American Men's Handball Championship was the first edition of the South and Central American Men's Handball Championship, held from 21 to 25 January 2020 in Brazil. It acted as the South and Central American qualifying tournament for the 2021 World Men's Handball Championship in Egypt.

The competition consisted in a round-robin of 6 national teams playing against them in a five days row. Argentina won the tournament.

== Standings ==
Pos	Team	Pld	W	D	L	GF	GA	GD	Pts	Qualification
1st place, gold medalist(s)	Argentina	5	5	0	0	220	91	+129	10	2021 World Championship
2nd place, silver medalist(s)	Brazil	5	4	0	1	210	87	+123	8	2021 World Championship
3rd place, bronze medalist(s)	Uruguay	5	3	0	2	148	110	+38	6	2021 World Championship
4	Chile	5	2	0	3	151	119	+32	4	Last Chance Tournament
5	Paraguay	5	1	0	4	133	169	−36	2	Last Chance Tournament
6	Bolivia	5	0	0	5	32	318	−286	0	

Source: HBARG
Rules for classification: 1) points; 2) head-to-head points; 3) head-to-head goal difference; 4) head-to-head number of goals scored; 5) goal difference.

== Results ==
All times are local (UTC−3).

21 January 2020; 15:00	Chile	25–28	Uruguay	CERHAND, Maringá; Attendance: 350; Referees: Schulze, Tönnies (GER)
21 January 2020; 15:00	E. Feuchtmann 8	(13–15)	Fabra 8	CERHAND, Maringá; Attendance: 350; Referees: Schulze, Tönnies (GER)
21 January 2020; 15:00	2× (yellow card) 7× (suspension)	Report	2× (yellow card) 4× (suspension)	CERHAND, Maringá; Attendance: 350; Referees: Schulze, Tönnies (GER)

21 January 2020; 17:00	Argentina	82–7	Bolivia	Ginásio Parque do Japão, Maringá; Attendance: 200; Referees: Marques, Magalhães (BRA)
21 January 2020; 17:00	I. Pizarro 20	(42–5)	Lisidro 6	Ginásio Parque do Japão, Maringá; Attendance: 200; Referees: Marques, Magalhães (BRA)
21 January 2020; 17:00		Report	1× (suspension)	Ginásio Parque do Japão, Maringá; Attendance: 200; Referees: Marques, Magalhães (BRA)

21 January 2020; 19:00	Brazil	46–19	Paraguay	Ginásio Parque do Japão, Maringá; Referees: Lenci, Grillo (ARG)
21 January 2020; 19:00	Chiuffa 7	(24–7)	Mendoza 5	Ginásio Parque do Japão, Maringá; Referees: Lenci, Grillo (ARG)
21 January 2020; 19:00	1× (yellow card) 4× (suspension)	Report	1× (yellow card) 4× (suspension) 1× (red card)	Ginásio Parque do Japão, Maringá; Referees: Lenci, Grillo (ARG)

22 January 2020; 17:00	Argentina	33–17	Uruguay	Ginásio Parque do Japão, Maringá; Attendance: 200; Referees: Marques, Magalhães (BRA)
22 January 2020; 17:00	Fernández, Mouriño 4	(15–7)	Fabra, Méndez 4	Ginásio Parque do Japão, Maringá; Attendance: 200; Referees: Marques, Magalhães (BRA)
22 January 2020; 17:00	3× (yellow card) 5× (suspension)	Report	2× (yellow card) 2× (suspension)	Ginásio Parque do Japão, Maringá; Attendance: 200; Referees: Marques, Magalhães (BRA)

22 January 2020; 17:00	Paraguay	22–31	Chile	Ginásio Parque do Japão, Maringá; Attendance: 300; Referees: Delgado, Burgos (ARG)
22 January 2020; 17:00	Mendoza 4	(9–14)	E. Feuchtmann 8	Ginásio Parque do Japão, Maringá; Attendance: 300; Referees: Delgado, Burgos (ARG)
22 January 2020; 17:00	1× (yellow card) 3× (suspension)	Report	2× (yellow card) 4× (suspension)	Ginásio Parque do Japão, Maringá; Attendance: 300; Referees: Delgado, Burgos (ARG)

22 January 2020; 19:00	Brazil	77–9	Bolivia	Ginásio Parque do Japão, Maringá; Attendance: 500; Referees: Estrada, Pineda (COL)
22 January 2020; 19:00	Pacheco 12	(35–5)	Lisidro 5	Ginásio Parque do Japão, Maringá; Attendance: 500; Referees: Estrada, Pineda (COL)
22 January 2020; 19:00	1× (yellow card) 2× (suspension)	Report	1× (suspension)	Ginásio Parque do Japão, Maringá; Attendance: 500; Referees: Estrada, Pineda (COL)

23 January 2020; 15:00	Bolivia	1–55	Uruguay	Ginásio Chico Neto, Maringá; Attendance: 300; Referees: Delgado, Burgos (ARG)
23 January 2020; 15:00	Marcelo 1	(0–24)	three players 7	Ginásio Chico Neto, Maringá; Attendance: 300; Referees: Delgado, Burgos (ARG)
23 January 2020; 15:00	1× (yellow card) 3× (suspension)	Report	1× (yellow card)	Ginásio Chico Neto, Maringá; Attendance: 300; Referees: Delgado, Burgos (ARG)

23 January 2020; 17:00	Argentina	50–21	Paraguay	Ginásio Chico Neto, Maringá; Attendance: 550; Referees: Estrada, Pineda (COL)
23 January 2020; 17:00	F. Pizarro 8	(24–7)	Melgarejo 4	Ginásio Chico Neto, Maringá; Attendance: 550; Referees: Estrada, Pineda (COL)
23 January 2020; 17:00	3× (yellow card) 1× (suspension)	Report	3× (suspension)	Ginásio Chico Neto, Maringá; Attendance: 550; Referees: Estrada, Pineda (COL)

23 January 2020; 19:00	Brazil	32–20	Chile	Ginásio Chico Neto, Maringá; Attendance: 4,000; Referees: Grillo, Lenci (ARG)
23 January 2020; 19:00	Langaro 5	(14–11)	E. Feuchtmann, R. Salinas 5	Ginásio Chico Neto, Maringá; Attendance: 4,000; Referees: Grillo, Lenci (ARG)
23 January 2020; 19:00	1× (yellow card) 7× (suspension) 1× (red card)	Report	3× (yellow card) 7× (suspension)	Ginásio Chico Neto, Maringá; Attendance: 4,000; Referees: Grillo, Lenci (ARG)

24 January 2020; 15:00	Chile	22–30	Argentina	Ginásio Chico Neto, Maringá; Attendance: 200; Referees: Schulze, Tönnies (GER)
24 January 2020; 15:00	Ceballos 6	(11–16)	Fernández 7	Ginásio Chico Neto, Maringá; Attendance: 200; Referees: Schulze, Tönnies (GER)
24 January 2020; 15:00	2× (yellow card) 6× (suspension)	Report	2× (yellow card) 6× (suspension)	Ginásio Chico Neto, Maringá; Attendance: 200; Referees: Schulze, Tönnies (GER)

24 January 2020; 17:00	Paraguay	51–8	Bolivia	Ginásio Chico Neto, Maringá; Attendance: 400; Referees: Marques, Magalhães (BRA)
24 January 2020; 17:00	Fiore 11	(29–4)	Lisidro 3	Ginásio Chico Neto, Maringá; Attendance: 400; Referees: Marques, Magalhães (BRA)
24 January 2020; 17:00	1× (yellow card)	Report	1× (suspension)	Ginásio Chico Neto, Maringá; Attendance: 400; Referees: Marques, Magalhães (BRA)

24 January 2020; 19:00	Uruguay	14–31	Brazil	Ginásio Chico Neto, Maringá; Attendance: 2,300; Referees: Delgado, Burgos (ARG)
24 January 2020; 19:00	Fabra 4	(9–13)	three players 5	Ginásio Chico Neto, Maringá; Attendance: 2,300; Referees: Delgado, Burgos (ARG)
24 January 2020; 19:00	1× (yellow card) 4× (suspension)	Report	2× (yellow card) 5× (suspension) 1× (red card)	Ginásio Chico Neto, Maringá; Attendance: 2,300; Referees: Delgado, Burgos (ARG)

25 January 2020; 15:00	Chile	53–7	Bolivia	Ginásio Chico Neto, Maringá; Attendance: 280; Referees: Estrada, Pineda (COL)
25 January 2020; 15:00	Payá 20	(24–0)	Lisidro 4	Ginásio Chico Neto, Maringá; Attendance: 280; Referees: Estrada, Pineda (COL)
25 January 2020; 15:00	1× (yellow card) 2× (suspension)	Report	3× (yellow card)	Ginásio Chico Neto, Maringá; Attendance: 280; Referees: Estrada, Pineda (COL)

25 January 2020; 17:00	Paraguay	20–34	Uruguay	Ginásio Chico Neto, Maringá; Attendance: 2,000; Referees: Grillo, Lenci (ARG)
25 January 2020; 17:00	Martínez 6	(8–14)	Millán 8	Ginásio Chico Neto, Maringá; Attendance: 2,000; Referees: Grillo, Lenci (ARG)
25 January 2020; 17:00	2× (yellow card) 4× (suspension) 3× (red card)	Report	1× (yellow card) 1× (suspension) 1× (red card)	Ginásio Chico Neto, Maringá; Attendance: 2,000; Referees: Grillo, Lenci (ARG)

25 January 2020; 19:00	Argentina	25–24	Brazil	Ginásio Chico Neto, Maringá; Attendance: 6,000; Referees: Schulze, Tönnies (GER)
25 January 2020; 19:00	F. Pizarro 9	(12–13)	Langaro, Teixeira 5	Ginásio Chico Neto, Maringá; Attendance: 6,000; Referees: Schulze, Tönnies (GER)
25 January 2020; 19:00	4× (yellow card) 5× (suspension) 1× (red card)	Report	1× (yellow card) 9× (suspension) 1× (red card)	Ginásio Chico Neto, Maringá; Attendance: 6,000; Referees: Schulze, Tönnies (GER)

== All-star team ==
The all-star team was announced on 7 February 2020. Ignacio Pizarro was the tournament top-scorer with 35 goals.

Position	Player
Goalkeeper	Leonardo Terçariol (BRA)
Right wing	Fábio Chiuffa (BRA)
Right back	Rodrigo Salinas Muñoz (CHI)
Centre back	Diego Simonet (ARG)
Left back	Haniel Langaro (BRA)
Left wing	Ignacio Pizarro (ARG)
Pivot	Esteban Salinas (CHI)
