= Peru men's national handball team =

Peru

Information
- Association: Federacion Deportiva Peruana de Handball
- Coach: Ivan Bendezu
- Assistant coach: José Fuentes; Magno Mora

Colours
1st	2nd	3rd

Results

Pan American Championship
- Appearances: 1 (First in 2018)
- Best result: 10th (2018)
- Last updated on Unknown.

The Peru national handball team is the national team of Peru. It takes part in international handball competitions.

== Tournament record ==
=== Pan American Games ===
Year	Round	Position	GP	W	D*	L	GS	GA
(Peru) Lima 2019	7th place match	8th	5	0	0	5	91	150

=== Pan American Championship ===
Year	Round	Position	GP	W	D*	L	GS	GA
(Greenland) 2018	ninth place match	10th	5	0	0	5	98	178

=== South and Central American Championship ===
Year	Round	Position	GP	W	D*	L	GF	GA
(Paraguay) 2026	round robin	5th	5	0	0	5	90	236
Total	1/4	1 title	5	0	0	5	90	236

=== South American Games ===
Year	Round	Position	GP	W	D*	L	GS	GA
(Bolivia) 2018	Consolation round	6th	4	1	0	3	40	107

=== Bolivarian Games ===
Year	Round	Position	GP	W	D*	L	GS	GA
(Colombia) 2017	round robin	4th	4	1	0	3	123	128
(Colombia) 2022	round robin	5th	4	0	0	4	107	141

=== IHF South and Central American Emerging Nations Championship ===
Year	Round	Position	GP	W	D*	L	GS	GA
(Colombia) 2018	bronze medal game	3rd	6	4	0	2	156	152
