= Gisela González =

Paraguayan handball player (born 1997)

Personal information
- Nationality: Paraguayan
- Born: 16 April 1997 (age 29)
- Height: 1.69 m (5 ft 7 in)

Sport
- Sport: Handball
- Position: Right wing
- Current club: CB Gijon
National team
Years	Team	Apps	(Gls)
–	Paraguay	148	(31)
Medal record
South and Central American Championship
Bronze medal – third place	2021 Paraguay
Bolivarian Games
Gold medal – first place	2017 Santa Marta	Team
Gold medal – first place	2022 Valledupar	Team

Gisela González (born 16 April 1997) is a Paraguayan handball player for CB Elche and the Paraguay national team.

She was selected to represent Paraguay at the 2017 World Women's Handball Championship.
