= 2020 South and Central American Handball Last Chance Qualification Tournament =

Tournament details
- Host country: Uruguay
- Venue(s): 1 (in 1 host city)
- Teams: 3 (from 1 confederation)

The 2020 South and Central American Handball Last Chance Qualification Tournament would have been contested by four teams, including nations from the 2020 South and Central American Men's Handball Championship in Florida, Uruguay. The winner would have qualified for the 2021 World Men's Handball Championship.

The tournament was scheduled to take place from 15 to 21 June, but was postponed due to the COVID-19 pandemic. It was rescheduled to 4 to 7 November 2020, but it was cancelled on 29 October 2020. On 10 November 2020, the tournament was cancelled and Chile were nominated for the 2021 World Championship.
