= Bolivia men's national handball team =

Bolivia

Information
- Association: Federacion Boliviana de handball

Colours
1st	2nd

Results

South and Central American Championship
- Appearances: 1 (First in 2020)
- Best result: 6th (2020)
- Last updated on Unknown.

The Bolivia national handball team is the national handball team of Bolivia.

== Tournaments record ==
=== South and Central American Championship ===
Year	Round	Position	GP	W	D*	L	GS	GA
(Brazil) 2020	round robin	6th	5	0	0	5	32	318
(Brazil) 2022	Match for sixth place	7th	3	0	0	3	33	151
Total			8	0	0	8	65	469

=== South American Games ===
Year	Round	Position	GP	W	D*	L	GS	GA
(Bolivia) 2018	Consolation round	7th	4	0	0	4	37	182

=== Bolivarian Games ===
Year	Round	Position	GP	W	D*	L	GS	GA
(Colombia) 2017	round robin	5th	4	0	0	4	50	220

=== IHF South and Central American Emerging Nations Championship ===
Year	Round	Position	GP	W	D*	L	GS	GA
(Colombia) 2018	consolation round	10th	5	1	0	4	119	157
