= 2018 IHF South and Central American Emerging Nations Championship =

Tournament details
- Host country: Colombia
- Venue: 1 (in 1 host city)
- Dates: 22–28 October
- Teams: 11 (from 1 confederation)

Final positions
- Champions: Colombia (1st title)
- Runners-up: Paraguay
- Third place: Peru
- Fourth place: Guatemala

Tournament statistics
- Matches played: 30
- Top scorers: (Ecuador) Gerdy Litardo (48 goals)

The 2018 IHF South and Central American Emerging Nations Championship was the 1st edition of this Handball event organized by the International Handball Federation. It was held in Palmira, Colombia at the Pabellon Blanco, from 22 to 28 October.

== Group stage ==
=== Group A ===
Pos	Team	Pld	W	D	L	GF	GA	GD	Pts	Qualification
1	Costa Rica	2	2	0	0	98	44	+54	4	Quarterfinals
2	Paraguay	2	1	0	1	82	53	+29	2	Quarterfinals
3	Panama	2	0	0	2	30	113	−83	0	Consolation round

Source: IHF
Rules for classification: 1) points; 2) head-to-head points; 3) head-to-head goal difference; 4) head-to-head number of goals scored; 5) goal difference.

All times are local (UTC–5).

22 October 2018; 11:30	Panama	12–63	Costa Rica	Pabellon Blanco, Palmira; Attendance: 250; Referees: Paolantoni, Garcia (ARG)
22 October 2018; 11:30	Vergara 3	(5–27)	Hidalgo 11	Pabellon Blanco, Palmira; Attendance: 250; Referees: Paolantoni, Garcia (ARG)
22 October 2018; 11:30	6× (suspension) 1× (red card)	Report	2× (yellow card)	Pabellon Blanco, Palmira; Attendance: 250; Referees: Paolantoni, Garcia (ARG)

23 October 2018; 18:00	Paraguay	50–18	Panama	Pabellon Blanco, Palmira; Attendance: 130; Referees: Paguaga, Zambrano (HON)
23 October 2018; 18:00	Garcete 10	(24–7)	Jaramillo 7	Pabellon Blanco, Palmira; Attendance: 130; Referees: Paguaga, Zambrano (HON)
23 October 2018; 18:00	2× (yellow card) 4× (suspension)	Report	11× (suspension)	Pabellon Blanco, Palmira; Attendance: 130; Referees: Paguaga, Zambrano (HON)

24 October 2018; 12:00	Paraguay	32–35	Costa Rica	Pabellon Blanco, Palmira; Attendance: 250; Referees: Magalhaes, Silva (BRA)
24 October 2018; 12:00	Garcete 7	(15–18)	Obando 8	Pabellon Blanco, Palmira; Attendance: 250; Referees: Magalhaes, Silva (BRA)
24 October 2018; 12:00	3× (yellow card) 10× (suspension)	Report	2× (yellow card) 1× (suspension)	Pabellon Blanco, Palmira; Attendance: 250; Referees: Magalhaes, Silva (BRA)

=== Group B ===
Pos	Team	Pld	W	D	L	GF	GA	GD	Pts	Qualification
1	Colombia	3	3	0	0	113	50	+63	6	Quarterfinals
2	Ecuador	3	2	0	1	109	90	+19	4	Quarterfinals
3	Honduras	3	1	0	2	72	102	−30	2	Quarterfinals
4	El Salvador	3	0	0	3	65	117	−52	0	Consolation round

Source: IHF
Rules for classification: 1) points; 2) head-to-head points; 3) head-to-head goal difference; 4) head-to-head number of goals scored; 5) goal difference.

22 October 2018; 13:30	Ecuador	41–30	El Salvador	Pabellon Blanco, Palmira; Attendance: 400; Referees: Moraga, Zavalla (CHI)
22 October 2018; 13:30	Three players 8	(19–17)	Espinoza 10	Pabellon Blanco, Palmira; Attendance: 400; Referees: Moraga, Zavalla (CHI)
22 October 2018; 13:30	1× (yellow card) 7× (suspension)	Report	8× (suspension)	Pabellon Blanco, Palmira; Attendance: 400; Referees: Moraga, Zavalla (CHI)

22 October 2018; 16:30	Colombia	36–13	Honduras	Pabellon Blanco, Palmira; Attendance: 350; Referees: Araujo, Perdomo (URU)
22 October 2018; 16:30	Gallego 7	(21–5)	García 5	Pabellon Blanco, Palmira; Attendance: 350; Referees: Araujo, Perdomo (URU)
22 October 2018; 16:30	2× (yellow card) 5× (suspension)	Report	5× (suspension)	Pabellon Blanco, Palmira; Attendance: 350; Referees: Araujo, Perdomo (URU)

23 October 2018; 10:00	Honduras	25–44	Ecuador	Pabellon Blanco, Palmira; Attendance: 150; Referees: Valverde, Segura (CRC)
23 October 2018; 10:00	García 5	(21–21)	Murillo 9	Pabellon Blanco, Palmira; Attendance: 150; Referees: Valverde, Segura (CRC)
23 October 2018; 10:00	1× (yellow card) 8× (suspension) 1× (red card)	Report	4× (suspension)	Pabellon Blanco, Palmira; Attendance: 150; Referees: Valverde, Segura (CRC)

23 October 2018; 16:00	El Salvador	13–42	Colombia	Pabellon Blanco, Palmira; Attendance: 220; Referees: Paolantoni, Garcia (ARG)
23 October 2018; 16:00	Ramos 4	(10–19)	Ramirez 11	Pabellon Blanco, Palmira; Attendance: 220; Referees: Paolantoni, Garcia (ARG)
23 October 2018; 16:00	5× (suspension)	Report	3× (yellow card) 3× (suspension)	Pabellon Blanco, Palmira; Attendance: 220; Referees: Paolantoni, Garcia (ARG)

24 October 2018; 10:00	El Salvador	22–34	Honduras	Pabellon Blanco, Palmira; Attendance: 120; Referees: Estrada, Pineda (COL)
24 October 2018; 10:00	Ramos 6	(8–13)	Cantor 6	Pabellon Blanco, Palmira; Attendance: 120; Referees: Estrada, Pineda (COL)
24 October 2018; 10:00	1× (yellow card) 4× (suspension) 1× (red card)	Report	2× (yellow card) 4× (suspension) 1× (red card)	Pabellon Blanco, Palmira; Attendance: 120; Referees: Estrada, Pineda (COL)

24 October 2018; 16:00	Colombia	35–24	Ecuador	Pabellon Blanco, Palmira; Attendance: 500; Referees: Araujo, Perdomo (URU)
24 October 2018; 16:00	Mayo 7	(20–16)	Lutardo 11	Pabellon Blanco, Palmira; Attendance: 500; Referees: Araujo, Perdomo (URU)
24 October 2018; 16:00	3× (yellow card) 6× (suspension)	Report	1× (yellow card) 7× (suspension) 1× (red card)	Pabellon Blanco, Palmira; Attendance: 500; Referees: Araujo, Perdomo (URU)

=== Group C ===
Pos	Team	Pld	W	D	L	GF	GA	GD	Pts	Qualification
1	French Guiana	3	3	0	0	90	58	+32	6	Quarterfinals
2	Peru	3	2	0	1	74	72	+2	4	Quarterfinals
3	Guatemala	3	1	0	2	82	65	+17	2	Quarterfinals
4	Bolivia	3	0	0	3	52	103	−51	0	Consolation round

Source: IHF
Rules for classification: 1) points; 2) head-to-head points; 3) head-to-head goal difference; 4) head-to-head number of goals scored; 5) goal difference.

22 October 2018; 18:30	Guatemala	35–10	Bolivia	Pabellon Blanco, Palmira; Referees: Estrada, Pineda (COL)
22 October 2018; 18:30	Herrera 10	(16–5)	Lisidro 4	Pabellon Blanco, Palmira; Referees: Estrada, Pineda (COL)
22 October 2018; 18:30	2× (yellow card) 7× (suspension)	Report	1× (yellow card) 2× (suspension)	Pabellon Blanco, Palmira; Referees: Estrada, Pineda (COL)

22 October 2018; 20:30	Peru	16–25	French Guiana	Pabellon Blanco, Palmira; Attendance: 450; Referees: Magalhaes, Silva (BRA)
22 October 2018; 20:30	Zerillo 6	(9–13)	Merille 6	Pabellon Blanco, Palmira; Attendance: 450; Referees: Magalhaes, Silva (BRA)
22 October 2018; 20:30	2× (yellow card) 3× (suspension)	Report	1× (yellow card) 4× (suspension)	Pabellon Blanco, Palmira; Attendance: 450; Referees: Magalhaes, Silva (BRA)

23 October 2018; 12:00	French Guiana	28–21	Guatemala	Pabellon Blanco, Palmira; Attendance: 400; Referees: Moraga, Zavalla (CHI)
23 October 2018; 12:00	Cippe 8	(12–10)	Herrera 7	Pabellon Blanco, Palmira; Attendance: 400; Referees: Moraga, Zavalla (CHI)
23 October 2018; 12:00	1× (yellow card) 5× (suspension)	Report	2× (yellow card) 4× (suspension)	Pabellon Blanco, Palmira; Attendance: 400; Referees: Moraga, Zavalla (CHI)

23 October 2018; 14:00	Bolivia	21–31	Peru	Pabellon Blanco, Palmira; Attendance: 350; Referees: Amarilla, Rodriguez (PAN)
23 October 2018; 14:00	Canaza 7	(5–17)	Lopez, Trelles 5	Pabellon Blanco, Palmira; Attendance: 350; Referees: Amarilla, Rodriguez (PAN)
23 October 2018; 14:00	6× (suspension)	Report	2× (yellow card) 7× (suspension)	Pabellon Blanco, Palmira; Attendance: 350; Referees: Amarilla, Rodriguez (PAN)

24 October 2018; 14:00	French Guiana	37–21	Bolivia	Pabellon Blanco, Palmira; Attendance: 400; Referees: Zambrano, Paguaga (HON)
24 October 2018; 14:00	Eli 7	(18–7)	Serrudo 8	Pabellon Blanco, Palmira; Attendance: 400; Referees: Zambrano, Paguaga (HON)
24 October 2018; 14:00	2× (yellow card) 6× (suspension)	Report	2× (yellow card) 2× (suspension)	Pabellon Blanco, Palmira; Attendance: 400; Referees: Zambrano, Paguaga (HON)

24 October 2018; 18:00	Guatemala	26–27	Peru	Pabellon Blanco, Palmira; Attendance: 100; Referees: Paolantoni, Garcia (ARG)
24 October 2018; 18:00	Martinez 8	(11–11)	Gutelius 6	Pabellon Blanco, Palmira; Attendance: 100; Referees: Paolantoni, Garcia (ARG)
24 October 2018; 18:00	1× (yellow card) 7× (suspension)	Report	3× (yellow card) 7× (suspension)	Pabellon Blanco, Palmira; Attendance: 100; Referees: Paolantoni, Garcia (ARG)

== Consolation round ==
Pos	Team	Pld	W	D	L	GF	GA	GD	Pts
9	El Salvador	2	2	0	0	64	57	+7	4
10	Bolivia	2	1	0	1	67	54	+13	2
11	Panama	2	0	0	2	49	69	−20	0

Source: IHF
Rules for classification: 1) points; 2) head-to-head points; 3) head-to-head goal difference; 4) head-to-head number of goals scored; 5) goal difference.

26 October 2018; 10:00	El Salvador	33–29	Bolivia	Pabellon Blanco, Palmira; Attendance: 500; Referees: Amarilla, Rodriguez (PAR)
26 October 2018; 10:00	Ramos 11	(13–13)	Crespo 8	Pabellon Blanco, Palmira; Attendance: 500; Referees: Amarilla, Rodriguez (PAR)
26 October 2018; 10:00	8× (suspension)	Report	1× (yellow card) 5× (suspension)	Pabellon Blanco, Palmira; Attendance: 500; Referees: Amarilla, Rodriguez (PAR)

27 October 2018; 10:00	Panama	28–31	El Salvador	Pabellon Blanco, Palmira; Attendance: 200; Referees: Segura, Valverde (CRC)
27 October 2018; 10:00	Jaramillo, Arrocha 8	(16–11)	Sosa 7	Pabellon Blanco, Palmira; Attendance: 200; Referees: Segura, Valverde (CRC)
27 October 2018; 10:00	1× (yellow card) 5× (suspension) 1× (red card)	Report	1× (yellow card) 1× (suspension)	Pabellon Blanco, Palmira; Attendance: 200; Referees: Segura, Valverde (CRC)

28 October 2018; 10:00	Panama	21–38	Bolivia	Pabellon Blanco, Palmira; Attendance: 100; Referees: Moraga, Zavalla (CHI)
28 October 2018; 10:00	Jaramillo 6	(11–19)	Lisidro 9	Pabellon Blanco, Palmira; Attendance: 100; Referees: Moraga, Zavalla (CHI)
28 October 2018; 10:00	1× (yellow card) 8× (suspension)	Report	1× (yellow card) 3× (suspension)	Pabellon Blanco, Palmira; Attendance: 100; Referees: Moraga, Zavalla (CHI)

== Knockout stage ==
=== Bracket ===
Quarterfinals
26 October
Colombia	45
Honduras	17
26 October
Ecuador	31
Peru	32
26 October
French Guiana	26
Guatemala	28
26 October
Costa Rica	22
Paraguay	33

Semifinals
27 October
Colombia	25
Peru	21
27 October
Guatemala	20
Paraguay	25

Final
28 October
Colombia	36
Paraguay	25
Third place
28 October
Peru	29
Guatemala	24

5th place bracket

5–8th place semifinals
27 October
Honduras	30
Ecuador	39
27 October
French Guiana	23
Costa Rica	24

Fifth place
28 October
Ecuador	24
Costa Rica	35
Seventh place
28 October
Honduras	23
French Guiana	40

=== Quarterfinals ===
26 October 2018; 16:00	Colombia	45–17	Honduras	Pabellon Blanco, Palmira; Attendance: 300; Referees: Moraga, Zavalla (CHI)
26 October 2018; 16:00	Bedoya 14	(20–9)	García 5	Pabellon Blanco, Palmira; Attendance: 300; Referees: Moraga, Zavalla (CHI)
26 October 2018; 16:00	1× (yellow card) 3× (suspension)	Report	1× (yellow card) 10× (suspension)	Pabellon Blanco, Palmira; Attendance: 300; Referees: Moraga, Zavalla (CHI)

26 October 2018; 14:00	Ecuador	31–32	Peru	Pabellon Blanco, Palmira; Attendance: 350; Referees: Paolantoni, Garcia (ARG)
26 October 2018; 14:00	Lutardo 7	(15–15)	Buitron 8	Pabellon Blanco, Palmira; Attendance: 350; Referees: Paolantoni, Garcia (ARG)
26 October 2018; 14:00	1× (yellow card) 6× (suspension)	Report	3× (yellow card) 6× (suspension)	Pabellon Blanco, Palmira; Attendance: 350; Referees: Paolantoni, Garcia (ARG)

26 October 2018; 12:00	French Guiana	26–28	Guatemala	Pabellon Blanco, Palmira; Attendance: 120; Referees: Magalhaes, Silva (BRA)
26 October 2018; 12:00	Deveau 6	(12–15)	Martinez 12	Pabellon Blanco, Palmira; Attendance: 120; Referees: Magalhaes, Silva (BRA)
26 October 2018; 12:00	1× (yellow card) 3× (suspension)	Report	2× (yellow card) 3× (suspension)	Pabellon Blanco, Palmira; Attendance: 120; Referees: Magalhaes, Silva (BRA)

26 October 2018; 18:00	Costa Rica	22–33	Paraguay	Pabellon Blanco, Palmira; Attendance: 300; Referees: Pineda, Estrada (COL)
26 October 2018; 18:00	Marchena, Gutierrez 5	(8–13)	Melgarejo, Benitez 7	Pabellon Blanco, Palmira; Attendance: 300; Referees: Pineda, Estrada (COL)
26 October 2018; 18:00	5× (suspension)	Report	3× (yellow card) 5× (suspension)	Pabellon Blanco, Palmira; Attendance: 300; Referees: Pineda, Estrada (COL)

=== 5–8th place semifinals ===
27 October 2018; 12:00	Honduras	30–39	Ecuador	Pabellon Blanco, Palmira; Referees: Amarilla, Rodriguez (PAR)
27 October 2018; 12:00	García 7	(18–18)	Litardo 11	Pabellon Blanco, Palmira; Referees: Amarilla, Rodriguez (PAR)
27 October 2018; 12:00	8× (suspension)	Report	1× (yellow card) 5× (suspension)	Pabellon Blanco, Palmira; Referees: Amarilla, Rodriguez (PAR)

27 October 2018; 14:00	French Guiana	23–24	Costa Rica	Pabellon Blanco, Palmira; Attendance: 200; Referees: Estrada, Pineda (COL)
27 October 2018; 14:00	Three players 5	(12–9)	Gutierrez 6	Pabellon Blanco, Palmira; Attendance: 200; Referees: Estrada, Pineda (COL)
27 October 2018; 14:00	3× (yellow card) 8× (suspension) 1× (red card)	Report	5× (suspension)	Pabellon Blanco, Palmira; Attendance: 200; Referees: Estrada, Pineda (COL)

=== Semifinals ===
27 October 2018; 16:00	Colombia	25–21	Peru	Pabellon Blanco, Palmira; Attendance: 420; Referees: Araujo, Perdomo (URU)
27 October 2018; 16:00	Mayo 6	(12–10)	Gutelius 5	Pabellon Blanco, Palmira; Attendance: 420; Referees: Araujo, Perdomo (URU)
27 October 2018; 16:00	3× (yellow card) 5× (suspension) 1× (red card)	Report	7× (suspension)	Pabellon Blanco, Palmira; Attendance: 420; Referees: Araujo, Perdomo (URU)

27 October 2018; 18:00	Guatemala	20–25	Paraguay	Pabellon Blanco, Palmira; Attendance: 200; Referees: Magalhaes, Silva (BRA)
27 October 2018; 18:00	Juarez 6	(11–10)	Garcete 7	Pabellon Blanco, Palmira; Attendance: 200; Referees: Magalhaes, Silva (BRA)
27 October 2018; 18:00	1× (yellow card) 1× (suspension)	Report	1× (yellow card) 2× (suspension)	Pabellon Blanco, Palmira; Attendance: 200; Referees: Magalhaes, Silva (BRA)

=== Seventh place game ===
28 October 2018; 12:00	Honduras	23–40	French Guiana	Pabellon Blanco, Palmira; Attendance: 280; Referees: Perdomo, Araujo (URU)
28 October 2018; 12:00	Cantor 6	(10–19)	Merille 10	Pabellon Blanco, Palmira; Attendance: 280; Referees: Perdomo, Araujo (URU)
28 October 2018; 12:00	1× (yellow card) 5× (suspension)	Report	2× (yellow card) 4× (suspension)	Pabellon Blanco, Palmira; Attendance: 280; Referees: Perdomo, Araujo (URU)

=== Fifth place game ===
28 October 2018; 14:00	Ecuador	24–35	Costa Rica	Pabellon Blanco, Palmira; Attendance: 400; Referees: Amarilla, Rodriguez (PAR)
28 October 2018; 14:00	Litardo 8	(13–14)	Hidalgo 8	Pabellon Blanco, Palmira; Attendance: 400; Referees: Amarilla, Rodriguez (PAR)
28 October 2018; 14:00	3× (yellow card) 2× (suspension) 1× (red card)	Report	2× (yellow card) 5× (suspension)	Pabellon Blanco, Palmira; Attendance: 400; Referees: Amarilla, Rodriguez (PAR)

=== Third place game ===
28 October 2018; 16:00	Peru	29–24	Guatemala	Pabellon Blanco, Palmira; Attendance: 500; Referees: Paolantoni, Garcia (ARG)
28 October 2018; 16:00	Zerillo 6	(14–13)	Juarez 8	Pabellon Blanco, Palmira; Attendance: 500; Referees: Paolantoni, Garcia (ARG)
28 October 2018; 16:00	2× (yellow card) 3× (suspension)	Report	2× (yellow card) 4× (suspension) 1× (red card)	Pabellon Blanco, Palmira; Attendance: 500; Referees: Paolantoni, Garcia (ARG)

=== Final ===
28 October 2018; 18:00	Colombia	36–25	Paraguay	Pabellon Blanco, Palmira; Attendance: 1500; Referees: Magalhaes, Silva (BRA)
28 October 2018; 18:00	Gonzalez 10	(16–11)	Benitez 7	Pabellon Blanco, Palmira; Attendance: 1500; Referees: Magalhaes, Silva (BRA)
28 October 2018; 18:00	1× (yellow card) 3× (suspension)	Report	3× (yellow card) 5× (suspension)	Pabellon Blanco, Palmira; Attendance: 1500; Referees: Magalhaes, Silva (BRA)

=== Final standing ===
Rank	Team
1st place, gold medalist(s)	Colombia
2nd place, silver medalist(s)	Paraguay
3rd place, bronze medalist(s)	Peru
4	Guatemala
5	Costa Rica
6	Ecuador
7	French Guiana
8	Honduras
9	El Salvador
10	Bolivia
11	Panama

Team qualified to the 2019 IHF Emerging Nations Championship
