= Handball at the 2017 Bolivarian Games =

Tournament details
- Host country: Colombia
- Venue: 1 (in 1 host city)
- Dates: 20–24 November
- Teams: 11 (from 1 confederation)

Final positions
- Champions: Chile (men); Paraguay (women)
- Runners-up: Colombia (men); Chile (women)
- Third place: Venezuela (men); Venezuela (women)
- Fourth place: Peru (men); Colombia (women)

Tournament statistics
- Top scorers: (Venezuela) Ivan Perez (42 goals) (Venezuela) Marian Salcedo (59 goals)

Handball competition of the 2017 Bolivarian Games in Santa Marta will be held from November 20 to 24 at the Coliseu Menor.

== Participating teams ==
Men

- Bolivia
- Chile
- Colombia
- Peru
- Venezuela

Women

- Bolivia
- Chile
- Colombia
- Paraguay
- Peru
- Venezuela

== Medalists ==
Event	Gold	Silver	Bronze
Men's tournament	Chile; Francisco Avendaño; Daniel Ayala; Pablo Baeza; Felipe Barrientos; Aaron Codina; Vicente Correa; Luciano Flores; Javier Frelijj; Reinaldo Gomez; Nicolás Jofre; René Oliva; Elías Oyarzún; Sebastián Pavez; Emilio Valenzuela	Colombia; Carlos Alvarez; Sebastian de Bedout; Sergio Bermejo; Anderson Caicedo; Eduardo Cossio; Juan Esteban Hernandez; José Londoño; Santiago Mosquera; Jorge Restrepo; Sebastian Restrepo; Daniel Suarez; Carlos Valencia; Edgar Vásquez; Julian Villa	Venezuela; Ali Barranco; Enmanuel Godoy; Jesus Guarecuco; Brahyan Hurtado; Victor Lopez; Jhonny Peñaloza; Ivan Perez; Eduardo Rodriguez; Kevin Rodriguez; Drubil Silva; Christopher Timaure; Ronal Timaure; Emilio Tovar; Juan Villalobos
Women's tournament	Paraguay; Fátima Acuña; Georginna Battaglia; María Paula Fernández; Camila Feschenko; Luz Genes; Gisela González; Giovanna Goroso; Delyne Leiva; Leticia Martínez; Kamila Rolon; Karina dos Santos; Alicia Villalba; Analia Yaryes	Chile; Claudia Alvarez; Maura Alvarez; Belen Canessa; Catalina Castro; Daniela Ceza; Inga Feuchtmann; Valeska Lovera; Daniela Miño; Catalina Moreno; Francisca Parra; Valentina Perez; Antonella Piantini; Valentina Sepulveda; Alicia Torres	Venezuela; Hilda Barreno; Oriana Carvajal; Luz Colina; Maria Franco; Leonela Garces; Nohelys Gimenez; Durancy Liendo; Paola Mata; Frannelly Polanco; Ysbelia Ramirez; Anyi Rodriguez; Genesis Rodriguez; Marian Salcedo; Jennifer Torrealba

== Men's tournament ==
Team	Pld	W	D	L	GF	GA	GD	Pts
Chile	4	3	1	0	149	74	75	7
Colombia	4	3	0	1	139	98	41	6
Venezuela	4	2	1	1	174	95	79	5
Peru	4	1	0	3	103	128	–25	2
Bolivia	4	0	0	4	50	220	–170	0

=== Round Robin ===
All times are local (UTC−05:00).

20 November 2017; 12:00	Chile	37–14	Peru	Coliseo Menor, Santa Marta; Referees: Estrada, Pineda (COL)
20 November 2017; 12:00	Pavez 6	(18–9)	Lopez 7	Coliseo Menor, Santa Marta; Referees: Estrada, Pineda (COL)
20 November 2017; 12:00	1× (yellow card) 2× (suspension)	Report	1× (yellow card)	Coliseo Menor, Santa Marta; Referees: Estrada, Pineda (COL)

20 November 2017; 15:30	Bolivia	17–51	Colombia	Coliseo Menor, Santa Marta; Referees: Pinto, Meneses (BRA)
20 November 2017; 15:30	Salazar 5	(6–22)	Cossio, Restrepo 7	Coliseo Menor, Santa Marta; Referees: Pinto, Meneses (BRA)
20 November 2017; 15:30	1× (yellow card) 5× (suspension)	Report	3× (yellow card) 6× (suspension)	Coliseo Menor, Santa Marta; Referees: Pinto, Meneses (BRA)

21 November 2017; 08:30	Venezuela	45–22	Peru	Coliseo Menor, Santa Marta; Referees: Galeano, Franco (PAR)
21 November 2017; 08:30	Timaure 11	(20–11)	Lopez 8	Coliseo Menor, Santa Marta; Referees: Galeano, Franco (PAR)
21 November 2017; 08:30	2× (yellow card) 4× (suspension)	Report	1× (yellow card) 4× (suspension)	Coliseo Menor, Santa Marta; Referees: Galeano, Franco (PAR)

21 November 2017; 12:00	Bolivia	8–49	Chile	Coliseo Menor, Santa Marta; Referees: Pinto, Meneses (BRA)
21 November 2017; 12:00	Crespo 3	(2–28)	Oyarzún 11	Coliseo Menor, Santa Marta; Referees: Pinto, Meneses (BRA)
21 November 2017; 12:00	2× (yellow card) 5× (suspension)	Report	2× (yellow card) 4× (suspension)	Coliseo Menor, Santa Marta; Referees: Pinto, Meneses (BRA)

22 November 2017; 12:00	Peru	51–14	Bolivia	Coliseo Menor, Santa Marta; Referees: Galeano, Franco (PAR)
22 November 2017; 12:00	three players 8	(28–7)	Salazar 4	Coliseo Menor, Santa Marta; Referees: Galeano, Franco (PAR)
22 November 2017; 12:00	4× (yellow card) 9× (suspension)	Report	1× (yellow card) 10× (suspension)	Coliseo Menor, Santa Marta; Referees: Galeano, Franco (PAR)

22 November 2017; 15:30	Colombia	33–31	Venezuela	Coliseo Menor, Santa Marta; Referees: Zabala, Moraga (CHI)
22 November 2017; 15:30	Restrepo 7	(17–13)	Perez 11	Coliseo Menor, Santa Marta; Referees: Zabala, Moraga (CHI)
22 November 2017; 15:30	3× (yellow card) 10× (suspension)	Report	1× (yellow card) 7× (suspension) 1× (red card)	Coliseo Menor, Santa Marta; Referees: Zabala, Moraga (CHI)

23 November 2017; 12:00	Venezuela	69–11	Bolivia	Coliseo Menor, Santa Marta; Referees: Estrada, Pineda (COL)
23 November 2017; 12:00	Perez, Villalobos 13	(35–5)	Salazar 3	Coliseo Menor, Santa Marta; Referees: Estrada, Pineda (COL)
23 November 2017; 12:00	1× (suspension)	Report	1× (yellow card) 9× (suspension)	Coliseo Menor, Santa Marta; Referees: Estrada, Pineda (COL)

23 November 2017; 15:30	Colombia	23–34	Chile	Coliseo Menor, Santa Marta; Referees: Pinto, Meneses (BRA)
23 November 2017; 15:30	Mayo 8	(10–17)	Flores 12	Coliseo Menor, Santa Marta; Referees: Pinto, Meneses (BRA)
23 November 2017; 15:30	3× (yellow card) 5× (suspension)	Report	2× (yellow card) 7× (suspension)	Coliseo Menor, Santa Marta; Referees: Pinto, Meneses (BRA)

24 November 2017; 17:30	Peru	16–32	Colombia	Coliseo Menor, Santa Marta; Referees: Zabala, Moraga (CHI)
24 November 2017; 17:30	Lopez 4	(6–16)	Mayo 7	Coliseo Menor, Santa Marta; Referees: Zabala, Moraga (CHI)
24 November 2017; 17:30	1× (yellow card) 3× (suspension) 1× (red card)	Report	2× (yellow card) 1× (suspension)	Coliseo Menor, Santa Marta; Referees: Zabala, Moraga (CHI)

24 November 2017; 21:00	Chile	29–29	Venezuela	Coliseo Menor, Santa Marta; Referees: Pinto, Meneses (BRA)
24 November 2017; 21:00	Oyarzún 12	(12–16)	Timaure 11	Coliseo Menor, Santa Marta; Referees: Pinto, Meneses (BRA)
24 November 2017; 21:00	3× (yellow card) 5× (suspension)	Report	3× (yellow card) 8× (suspension) 1× (red card)	Coliseo Menor, Santa Marta; Referees: Pinto, Meneses (BRA)

== Final standing ==
Rank	Team
Gold medal	Chile
Silver medal	Colombia
Bronze medal	Venezuela
4	Peru
5	Bolivia

== Women's tournament ==
Team	Pld	W	D	L	GF	GA	GD	Pts
Paraguay	5	5	0	0	233	82	151	10
Chile	5	4	0	1	185	89	96	8
Venezuela	5	3	0	2	199	104	95	6
Colombia	5	2	0	3	149	107	42	4
Peru	5	1	0	4	74	218	–144	2
Bolivia	5	0	0	5	32	272	–240	0

=== Round Robin ===
All times are local (UTC−05:00).

20 November 2017; 08:30	Paraguay	41–22	Venezuela	Coliseo Menor, Santa Marta; Referees: Zabala, Moraga (CHI)
20 November 2017; 08:30	Leiva 8	(17–11)	Carvajal 10	Coliseo Menor, Santa Marta; Referees: Zabala, Moraga (CHI)
20 November 2017; 08:30	1× (yellow card) 2× (suspension)	Report	1× (yellow card) 8× (suspension)	Coliseo Menor, Santa Marta; Referees: Zabala, Moraga (CHI)

20 November 2017; 10:15	Chile	47–14	Peru	Coliseo Menor, Santa Marta; Referees: Galeano, Franco (PAR)
20 November 2017; 10:15	Lovera 11	(22–10)	five players 2	Coliseo Menor, Santa Marta; Referees: Galeano, Franco (PAR)
20 November 2017; 10:15	1× (yellow card) 3× (suspension)	Report	1× (yellow card)	Coliseo Menor, Santa Marta; Referees: Galeano, Franco (PAR)

20 November 2017; 13:45	Bolivia	3–50	Colombia	Coliseo Menor, Santa Marta; Referees: Galeano, Franco (PAR)
20 November 2017; 13:45	Castillo 2	(2–24)	Garcia 10	Coliseo Menor, Santa Marta; Referees: Galeano, Franco (PAR)
20 November 2017; 13:45	3× (suspension)	Report	3× (suspension)	Coliseo Menor, Santa Marta; Referees: Galeano, Franco (PAR)

21 November 2017; 10:15	Paraguay	69–7	Bolivia	Coliseo Menor, Santa Marta; Referees: Estrada, Pineda (COL)
21 November 2017; 10:15	Acuña 18	(37–3)	Castillo 4	Coliseo Menor, Santa Marta; Referees: Estrada, Pineda (COL)
21 November 2017; 10:15	2× (yellow card) 2× (suspension)	Report	1× (yellow card) 3× (suspension)	Coliseo Menor, Santa Marta; Referees: Estrada, Pineda (COL)

21 November 2017; 13:45	Colombia	41–13	Peru	Coliseo Menor, Santa Marta; Referees: Zabala, Moraga (CHI)
21 November 2017; 13:45	Garcia 6	(21–4)	Preising 4	Coliseo Menor, Santa Marta; Referees: Zabala, Moraga (CHI)
21 November 2017; 13:45	1× (yellow card) 1× (suspension)	Report	1× (yellow card) 6× (suspension)	Coliseo Menor, Santa Marta; Referees: Zabala, Moraga (CHI)

21 November 2017; 15:30	Venezuela	21–33	Chile	Coliseo Menor, Santa Marta; Referees: Pinto, Meneses (BRA)
21 November 2017; 15:30	Salceso 9	(11–18)	Torres 8	Coliseo Menor, Santa Marta; Referees: Pinto, Meneses (BRA)
21 November 2017; 15:30	3× (yellow card) 5× (suspension) 1× (red card)	Report	3× (yellow card) 2× (suspension)	Coliseo Menor, Santa Marta; Referees: Pinto, Meneses (BRA)

22 November 2017; 08:30	Chile	53–5	Bolivia	Coliseo Menor, Santa Marta; Referees: Estrada, Pineda (COL)
22 November 2017; 08:30	Sepulveda 9	(27–2)	Avedaño 3	Coliseo Menor, Santa Marta; Referees: Estrada, Pineda (COL)
22 November 2017; 08:30	1× (yellow card) 1× (suspension)	Report	1× (yellow card)	Coliseo Menor, Santa Marta; Referees: Estrada, Pineda (COL)

22 November 2017; 10:15	Peru	6–57	Venezuela	Coliseo Menor, Santa Marta; Referees: Zabala, Moraga (CHI)
22 November 2017; 10:15	Preising 2	(2–25)	Salceso 13	Coliseo Menor, Santa Marta; Referees: Zabala, Moraga (CHI)
22 November 2017; 10:15	1× (yellow card) 5× (suspension)	Report	2× (yellow card) 1× (suspension)	Coliseo Menor, Santa Marta; Referees: Zabala, Moraga (CHI)

22 November 2017; 13:45	Paraguay	33–19	Colombia	Coliseo Menor, Santa Marta; Referees: Pinto, Meneses (BRA)
22 November 2017; 13:45	Acuña, Martínez 7	(16–7)	Estrada, Garcia 4	Coliseo Menor, Santa Marta; Referees: Pinto, Meneses (BRA)
22 November 2017; 13:45	3× (yellow card) 5× (suspension)	Report	2× (yellow card) 4× (suspension)	Coliseo Menor, Santa Marta; Referees: Pinto, Meneses (BRA)

23 November 2017; 08:30	Bolivia	5–72	Venezuela	Coliseo Menor, Santa Marta; Referees: Meneses, Riascos (BRA)
23 November 2017; 08:30	Leon 2	(2–35)	Salcedo 23	Coliseo Menor, Santa Marta; Referees: Meneses, Riascos (BRA)
23 November 2017; 08:30	2× (yellow card) 1× (suspension)	Report	2× (yellow card) 1× (suspension)	Coliseo Menor, Santa Marta; Referees: Meneses, Riascos (BRA)

23 November 2017; 10:15	Paraguay	61–13	Peru	Coliseo Menor, Santa Marta; Referees: Zabala, Moraga (CHI)
23 November 2017; 10:15	Martínez, González 9	(30–6)	Servat 4	Coliseo Menor, Santa Marta; Referees: Zabala, Moraga (CHI)
23 November 2017; 10:15	1× (yellow card) 1× (suspension)	Report	2× (yellow card) 5× (suspension)	Coliseo Menor, Santa Marta; Referees: Zabala, Moraga (CHI)

23 November 2017; 13:45	Colombia	20–31	Chile	Coliseo Menor, Santa Marta; Referees: Galeano, Franco (PAR)
23 November 2017; 13:45	Mazo, Campos 4	(12–15)	Feuchtmann 6	Coliseo Menor, Santa Marta; Referees: Galeano, Franco (PAR)
23 November 2017; 13:45	2× (yellow card) 2× (suspension) 1× (red card)	Report	1× (yellow card) 4× (suspension)	Coliseo Menor, Santa Marta; Referees: Galeano, Franco (PAR)

24 November 2017; 14:00	Peru	28–12	Bolivia	Coliseo Menor, Santa Marta; Referees: Estrada, Pineda (COL)
24 November 2017; 14:00	Angulo 9	(11–7)	Pinto, Avendaño 3	Coliseo Menor, Santa Marta; Referees: Estrada, Pineda (COL)
24 November 2017; 14:00	3× (yellow card) 4× (suspension)	Report	2× (yellow card) 4× (suspension)	Coliseo Menor, Santa Marta; Referees: Estrada, Pineda (COL)

24 November 2017; 15:45	Venezuela	27–19	Colombia	Coliseo Menor, Santa Marta; Referees: Galeano, Franco (PAR)
24 November 2017; 15:45	Salcedo 7	(14–14)	Garzon, Mazo 4	Coliseo Menor, Santa Marta; Referees: Galeano, Franco (PAR)
24 November 2017; 15:45	1× (yellow card) 5× (suspension)	Report	2× (yellow card) 6× (suspension)	Coliseo Menor, Santa Marta; Referees: Galeano, Franco (PAR)

24 November 2017; 19:15	Paraguay	29–21	Chile	Coliseo Menor, Santa Marta; Referees: Estrada, Pineda (COL)
24 November 2017; 19:15	Martínez 7	(15–9)	Canessa, Torres 4	Coliseo Menor, Santa Marta; Referees: Estrada, Pineda (COL)
24 November 2017; 19:15	3× (yellow card) 3× (suspension)	Report	3× (yellow card) 4× (suspension)	Coliseo Menor, Santa Marta; Referees: Estrada, Pineda (COL)

== Final standing ==
Rank	Team
Gold medal	Paraguay
Silver medal	Chile
Bronze medal	Venezuela
4	Colombia
5	Peru
6	Bolivia
