= Giovanna Goroso =

Paraguayan handball player (born 1998)

Personal information
- Full name: Giovanna Agostina Goroso Chaves
- Nationality: Paraguayan
- Born: 2 June 1998 (age 28)
- Height: 1.66 m (5 ft 5 in)

Sport
- Sport: Handball
- Position: Centre back
- Current club: Club Cerro Porteño
National team
Years	Team	Apps	(Gls)
–	Paraguay	7	(2)
Medal record
Bolivarian Games
Gold medal – first place	2017 Santa Marta	Team
Pan American Junior Championship
Bronze medal – third place	2018 Brazil

Giovanna Agostina Goroso Chaves (born 2 June 1998) is a Paraguayan handball player for Club Cerro Porteño and the Paraguay national team.

She was selected to represent Paraguay at the 2017 World Women's Handball Championship.
