= Luz Genes =

Paraguayan handball player (born 1984)

Personal information
- Full name: Luz Maria Genes Garcete
- Nationality: Paraguayan
- Born: 2 February 1984 (age 42)
- Height: 1.85 m (6 ft 1 in)

Sport
- Sport: Handball
- Position: Pivot
- Current club: Club Cerro Porteño
National team
Years	Team	Apps	(Gls)
–	Paraguay	132	(28)
Medal record
Bolivarian Games
Gold medal – first place	2017 Santa Marta

Luz Maria Genes Garcete (born 2 February 1984) is a Paraguayan handball player for Club Cerro Porteño and the Paraguay national team.

She was selected to represent Paraguay at the 2017 World Women's Handball Championship.
