= Ginásio Chico Neto =

Indoor sporting arena in Maringá, Brazil

- Interactive map of Ginásio Chico Neto
- Full name: Centro Esportivo Francisco Bueno Neto
- Location: Maringá, Paraná – Brazil
- Coordinates: 23°24′42.6″S 51°56′20.0″W
- Capacity: 4,538

Construction
- Opened: 1976

Ginásio Chico Neto, officially named Centro Esportivo Francisco Bueno Neto, is an indoor sporting arena located in Maringá, Brazil. The seating capacity of the arena is 4,538 people and it was opened on 1976. It was named after the Brazilian former football player Chico Netto.

The venue hosts matches of Volleyball, Futsal, etc.
