= Handball at the 2018 South American Games =

- Venue: Coliseo Municipal Curubamba
- Location: (Bolivia) Sacaba
- Dates: 27 May – 6 June
- Nations: 8
- Teams: 7 (men); 7 (women)

Handball competition of the 2018 South American Games in Cochabamba were held from May 27 to June 6 at the Coliseo Municipal Curubamba in the municipality of Sacaba, it qualified two places in both genders to the 2019 Pan American Games.

== Participating teams ==
Men

- Argentina
- Bolivia
- Brazil
- Chile
- Peru
- Uruguay
- Venezuela

Women

- Argentina
- Bolivia
- Brazil
- Chile
- Paraguay
- Peru
- Uruguay

== Medal summary ==
Event	Gold	Silver	Bronze
Men's tournament	Brazil	Argentina	Chile
Women's tournament	Brazil	Argentina	Chile

== Men's tournament ==
=== Preliminary round ===
==== Group A ====
Pos	Team	Pld	W	D	L	GF	GA	GD	Pts	Qualification
1	Brazil	3	3	0	0	144	47	+97	6	Semifinals
2	Chile	3	2	0	1	118	61	+57	4	Semifinals
3	Peru	3	1	0	2	59	99	−40	2	Consolation round
4	Bolivia (H)	3	0	0	3	24	138	−114	0	Consolation round

(H) Hosts

All times are local (UTC−04:00).

2 June 2018; 16:00	Peru	12–50	Brazil	Coliseo Municipal Curubamba, Sacaba; Attendance: 328; Referees: Sosa, Lemes (URU)
2 June 2018; 16:00	four players 2	(4–24)	Moraes 8	Coliseo Municipal Curubamba, Sacaba; Attendance: 328; Referees: Sosa, Lemes (URU)
2 June 2018; 16:00	1× (yellow card) 1× (suspension)	Report	1× (yellow card) 1× (red card)	Coliseo Municipal Curubamba, Sacaba; Attendance: 328; Referees: Sosa, Lemes (URU)

2 June 2018; 18:00	Chile	51–7	Bolivia	Coliseo Municipal Curubamba, Sacaba; Attendance: 520; Referees: Lenci, López (ARG)
2 June 2018; 18:00	Feuchtmann 9	(26–3)	Mercado 3	Coliseo Municipal Curubamba, Sacaba; Attendance: 520; Referees: Lenci, López (ARG)
2 June 2018; 18:00	2× (yellow card) 3× (suspension)	Report	2× (yellow card) 4× (suspension) 1× (red card)	Coliseo Municipal Curubamba, Sacaba; Attendance: 520; Referees: Lenci, López (ARG)

3 June 2018; 16:00	Chile	37–15	Peru	Coliseo Municipal Curubamba, Sacaba; Attendance: 250; Referees: Gonzalez, Prieto (URU)
3 June 2018; 16:00	Ceballos	(20–7)	Vélez, López 3	Coliseo Municipal Curubamba, Sacaba; Attendance: 250; Referees: Gonzalez, Prieto (URU)
3 June 2018; 16:00	1× (yellow card) 4× (suspension)	Report	4× (suspension)	Coliseo Municipal Curubamba, Sacaba; Attendance: 250; Referees: Gonzalez, Prieto (URU)

3 June 2018; 18:00	Brazil	55–5	Bolivia	Coliseo Municipal Curubamba, Sacaba; Attendance: 600; Referees: Zavalla, Moraga (CHI)
3 June 2018; 18:00	Hackbarth 10	(29–2)	five players 1	Coliseo Municipal Curubamba, Sacaba; Attendance: 600; Referees: Zavalla, Moraga (CHI)
3 June 2018; 18:00		Report	2× (suspension)	Coliseo Municipal Curubamba, Sacaba; Attendance: 600; Referees: Zavalla, Moraga (CHI)

4 June 2018; 16:00	Brazil	39–30	Chile	Coliseo Municipal Curubamba, Sacaba; Attendance: 300; Referees: Gonzalez, Prieto (URU)
4 June 2018; 16:00	Dutra, Teixeira 6	(22–15)	Salinas 6	Coliseo Municipal Curubamba, Sacaba; Attendance: 300; Referees: Gonzalez, Prieto (URU)
4 June 2018; 16:00	1× (yellow card) 7× (suspension)	Report	4× (yellow card) 5× (suspension)	Coliseo Municipal Curubamba, Sacaba; Attendance: 300; Referees: Gonzalez, Prieto (URU)

4 June 2018; 18:00	Bolivia	12–32	Peru	Coliseo Municipal Curubamba, Sacaba; Attendance: 400; Referees: Zavalla, Moraga (CHI)
4 June 2018; 18:00	Salazar 4	(6–14)	López 6	Coliseo Municipal Curubamba, Sacaba; Attendance: 400; Referees: Zavalla, Moraga (CHI)
4 June 2018; 18:00	2× (yellow card) 5× (suspension)	Report	1× (yellow card) 8× (suspension) 1× (red card)	Coliseo Municipal Curubamba, Sacaba; Attendance: 400; Referees: Zavalla, Moraga (CHI)

==== Group B ====
Pos	Team	Pld	W	D	L	GF	GA	GD	Pts	Qualification
1	Argentina	2	2	0	0	67	41	+26	4	Semifinals
2	Uruguay	2	1	0	1	43	50	−7	2	Semifinals
3	Venezuela	2	0	0	2	39	58	−19	0	Consolation round

2 June 2018; 20:00	Venezuela	20–36	Argentina	Coliseo Municipal Curubamba, Sacaba; Referees: Menezes, Pinto (BRA)
2 June 2018; 20:00	Palacios 7	(11–18)	Fernández 8	Coliseo Municipal Curubamba, Sacaba; Referees: Menezes, Pinto (BRA)
2 June 2018; 20:00	1× (yellow card) 6× (suspension)	Report	3× (yellow card) 4× (suspension)	Coliseo Municipal Curubamba, Sacaba; Referees: Menezes, Pinto (BRA)

3 June 2018; 20:00	Uruguay	22–19	Venezuela	Coliseo Municipal Curubamba, Sacaba; Attendance: 800; Referees: Lenci, López (ARG)
3 June 2018; 20:00	three players 5	(9–9)	Palacios, Timaure 4	Coliseo Municipal Curubamba, Sacaba; Attendance: 800; Referees: Lenci, López (ARG)
3 June 2018; 20:00	1× (yellow card) 3× (suspension)	Report	1× (yellow card) 5× (suspension) 1× (red card)	Coliseo Municipal Curubamba, Sacaba; Attendance: 800; Referees: Lenci, López (ARG)

4 June 2018; 20:00	Argentina	31–21	Uruguay	Coliseo Municipal Curubamba, Sacaba; Attendance: 350; Referees: Menezes, Pinto (BRA)
4 June 2018; 20:00	three players 5	(15–11)	Morandeira, Rostagno 3	Coliseo Municipal Curubamba, Sacaba; Attendance: 350; Referees: Menezes, Pinto (BRA)
4 June 2018; 20:00	3× (yellow card) 5× (suspension)	Report	3× (yellow card) 8× (suspension) 1× (red card)	Coliseo Municipal Curubamba, Sacaba; Attendance: 350; Referees: Menezes, Pinto (BRA)

=== Consolation round ===
Pos	Team	Pld	W	D	L	GF	GA	GD	Pts
5	Venezuela	2	2	0	0	73	33	+40	4
6	Peru	2	1	0	1	52	41	+11	2
7	Bolivia (H)	2	0	0	2	25	76	−51	0

(H) Hosts

5 June 2018; 16:00	Venezuela	44–13	Bolivia	Coliseo Municipal Curubamba, Sacaba; Referees: Sosa, Lemes (URU)
5 June 2018; 16:00	Godoy 8	(23–5)	Salazar 5	Coliseo Municipal Curubamba, Sacaba; Referees: Sosa, Lemes (URU)
5 June 2018; 16:00	1× (yellow card) 2× (suspension)	Report	4× (suspension)	Coliseo Municipal Curubamba, Sacaba; Referees: Sosa, Lemes (URU)

6 June 2018; 16:00	Venezuela	29–20	Peru	Coliseo Municipal Curubamba, Sacaba; Attendance: 250; Referees: Gonzalez, Prieto (URU)
6 June 2018; 16:00	Villalobos 7	(14–12)	López, Gutelius 4	Coliseo Municipal Curubamba, Sacaba; Attendance: 250; Referees: Gonzalez, Prieto (URU)
6 June 2018; 16:00	1× (yellow card) 6× (suspension)	Report	1× (yellow card) 3× (suspension)	Coliseo Municipal Curubamba, Sacaba; Attendance: 250; Referees: Gonzalez, Prieto (URU)

=== Knockout stage ===
==== Bracket ====
Semifinals
5 June
Brazil	41
Uruguay	27
5 June
Argentina	29
Chile	13

Final
6 June
Brazil	25
Argentina	22
Third place
6 June
Uruguay	20
Chile	23

==== Semifinals ====
5 June 2018; 18:00	Brazil	41–27	Uruguay	Coliseo Municipal Curubamba, Sacaba; Attendance: 300; Referees: Lenci, López (ARG)
5 June 2018; 18:00	Dutra 7	(23–14)	Milán 5	Coliseo Municipal Curubamba, Sacaba; Attendance: 300; Referees: Lenci, López (ARG)
5 June 2018; 18:00	2× (yellow card) 2× (suspension)	Report	2× (yellow card) 3× (suspension)	Coliseo Municipal Curubamba, Sacaba; Attendance: 300; Referees: Lenci, López (ARG)

5 June 2018; 20:00	Argentina	29–13	Chile	Coliseo Municipal Curubamba, Sacaba; Attendance: 500; Referees: Menezes, Pinto (BRA)
5 June 2018; 20:00	Vieyra 4	(12–7)	Salinas 6	Coliseo Municipal Curubamba, Sacaba; Attendance: 500; Referees: Menezes, Pinto (BRA)
5 June 2018; 20:00	4× (yellow card) 2× (suspension)	Report	2× (yellow card) 5× (suspension)	Coliseo Municipal Curubamba, Sacaba; Attendance: 500; Referees: Menezes, Pinto (BRA)

==== Bronze medal game ====
6 June 2018; 18:00	Chile	23–20	Uruguay	Coliseo Municipal Curubamba, Sacaba
6 June 2018; 18:00	Ceballos 7	(12–10)	Velazco, Fabra 5	Coliseo Municipal Curubamba, Sacaba
6 June 2018; 18:00	3× (yellow card) 1× (suspension)		2× (yellow card) 4× (suspension)	Coliseo Municipal Curubamba, Sacaba

==== Gold medal game ====
6 June 2018; 20:00	Brazil	25–22	Argentina	Coliseo Municipal Curubamba, Sacaba; Attendance: 1,000; Referees: Sosa, Lemes (URU)
6 June 2018; 20:00	Chiuffa 8	(10–10)	Baronetto 5	Coliseo Municipal Curubamba, Sacaba; Attendance: 1,000; Referees: Sosa, Lemes (URU)
6 June 2018; 20:00	3× (yellow card) 9× (suspension) 2× (red card)	Report	4× (yellow card) 7× (suspension)	Coliseo Municipal Curubamba, Sacaba; Attendance: 1,000; Referees: Sosa, Lemes (URU)

=== Final standing ===
Rank	Team
1st place, gold medalist(s)	Brazil
2nd place, silver medalist(s)	Argentina
3rd place, bronze medalist(s)	Chile
4	Uruguay
5	Venezuela
6	Peru
7	Bolivia

Team qualified to the 2019 Pan American Games

== Women's tournament ==
=== Preliminary round ===
==== Group A ====
Pos	Team	Pld	W	D	L	GF	GA	GD	Pts	Qualification
1	Brazil	2	2	0	0	58	31	+27	4	Semifinals
2	Paraguay	2	1	0	1	43	55	−12	2	Semifinals
3	Uruguay	2	0	0	2	37	52	−15	0	Consolation round

27 May 2018; 20:00	Brazil	33–16	Paraguay	Coliseo Municipal Curubamba, Sacaba; Attendance: 400; Referees: Gonzalez, Prieto (URU)
27 May 2018; 20:00	Costa 6	(17–7)	Acuña, Aluan 4	Coliseo Municipal Curubamba, Sacaba; Attendance: 400; Referees: Gonzalez, Prieto (URU)
27 May 2018; 20:00	1× (yellow card) 6× (suspension)	Report	2× (yellow card) 3× (suspension)	Coliseo Municipal Curubamba, Sacaba; Attendance: 400; Referees: Gonzalez, Prieto (URU)

28 May 2018; 20:00	Uruguay	22–27	Paraguay	Coliseo Municipal Curubamba, Sacaba; Attendance: 343; Referees: Paolantoni, García (ARG)
28 May 2018; 20:00	Grosso 6	(10–12)	Acuña, Fiore 6	Coliseo Municipal Curubamba, Sacaba; Attendance: 343; Referees: Paolantoni, García (ARG)
28 May 2018; 20:00	3× (yellow card) 2× (suspension)	Report	1× (yellow card) 5× (suspension) 1× (red card)	Coliseo Municipal Curubamba, Sacaba; Attendance: 343; Referees: Paolantoni, García (ARG)

29 May 2018; 20:00	Brazil	25–15	Uruguay	Coliseo Municipal Curubamba, Sacaba; Attendance: 258; Referees: Estrada, Pineda (COL)
29 May 2018; 20:00	Costa 5	(13–6)	Dondán, Fynn 3	Coliseo Municipal Curubamba, Sacaba; Attendance: 258; Referees: Estrada, Pineda (COL)
29 May 2018; 20:00	1× (yellow card) 2× (suspension)	Report	2× (yellow card) 4× (suspension)	Coliseo Municipal Curubamba, Sacaba; Attendance: 258; Referees: Estrada, Pineda (COL)

==== Group B ====
Pos	Team	Pld	W	D	L	GF	GA	GD	Pts	Qualification
1	Argentina	3	3	0	0	128	32	+96	6	Semifinals
2	Chile	3	2	0	1	99	44	+55	4	Semifinals
3	Peru	3	1	0	2	40	107	−67	2	Consolation round
4	Bolivia (H)	3	0	0	3	29	113	−84	0	Consolation round

(H) Hosts

27 May 2018; 16:00	Argentina	50–8	Peru	Coliseo Municipal Curubamba, Sacaba; Referees: De Souza, Vilela (BRA)
27 May 2018; 16:00	Iacoi 11	(27–5)	García 3	Coliseo Municipal Curubamba, Sacaba; Referees: De Souza, Vilela (BRA)
27 May 2018; 16:00	1× (suspension)	Report	4× (suspension)	Coliseo Municipal Curubamba, Sacaba; Referees: De Souza, Vilela (BRA)

27 May 2018; 18:00	Bolivia	6–41	Chile	Coliseo Municipal Curubamba, Sacaba; Referees: Estrada, Pineda (COL)
27 May 2018; 18:00	Castillo 5	(2–21)	Flores 7	Coliseo Municipal Curubamba, Sacaba; Referees: Estrada, Pineda (COL)
27 May 2018; 18:00	3× (suspension) 1× (red card)	Report	2× (yellow card) 2× (suspension)	Coliseo Municipal Curubamba, Sacaba; Referees: Estrada, Pineda (COL)

28 May 2018; 16:00	Chile	38–9	Peru	Coliseo Municipal Curubamba, Sacaba; Referees: Estrada, Pineda (COL)
28 May 2018; 16:00	Lovera 7	(21–6)	García 4	Coliseo Municipal Curubamba, Sacaba; Referees: Estrada, Pineda (COL)
28 May 2018; 16:00	2× (yellow card) 3× (suspension)	Report	2× (yellow card) 6× (suspension) 1× (red card)	Coliseo Municipal Curubamba, Sacaba; Referees: Estrada, Pineda (COL)

28 May 2018; 18:00	Bolivia	4–49	Argentina	Coliseo Municipal Curubamba, Sacaba; Referees: De Souza, Vilela (BRA)
28 May 2018; 18:00	Castillo 4	(1–22)	Bonazzola 10	Coliseo Municipal Curubamba, Sacaba; Referees: De Souza, Vilela (BRA)
28 May 2018; 18:00	4× (suspension)	Report	1× (yellow card)	Coliseo Municipal Curubamba, Sacaba; Referees: De Souza, Vilela (BRA)

29 May 2018; 16:00	Argentina	29–20	Chile	Coliseo Municipal Curubamba, Sacaba; Referees: González, Prieto (URU)
29 May 2018; 16:00	Bonazzola, Pizzo 5	(13–10)	Lovera 4	Coliseo Municipal Curubamba, Sacaba; Referees: González, Prieto (URU)
29 May 2018; 16:00	2× (yellow card) 3× (suspension)	Report	4× (yellow card) 2× (suspension)	Coliseo Municipal Curubamba, Sacaba; Referees: González, Prieto (URU)

29 May 2018; 18:00	Bolivia	19–23	Peru	Coliseo Municipal Curubamba, Sacaba; Referees: Paolantoni, García (ARG)
29 May 2018; 18:00	Castillo 11	(9–12)	Preising 6	Coliseo Municipal Curubamba, Sacaba; Referees: Paolantoni, García (ARG)
29 May 2018; 18:00	3× (yellow card) 3× (suspension)	Report	2× (yellow card) 3× (suspension)	Coliseo Municipal Curubamba, Sacaba; Referees: Paolantoni, García (ARG)

=== Consolation round ===
Pos	Team	Pld	W	D	L	GF	GA	GD	Pts
5	Uruguay	2	2	0	0	91	15	+76	4
6	Peru	2	1	0	1	31	69	−38	2
7	Bolivia	2	0	0	2	26	64	−38	0

30 May 2018; 16:00	Uruguay	41–7	Bolivia	Coliseo Municipal Curubamba, Sacaba; Attendance: 200; Referees: De Souza, Vilela (BRA)
30 May 2018; 16:00	Vázquez 6	(17–4)	Castillo 3	Coliseo Municipal Curubamba, Sacaba; Attendance: 200; Referees: De Souza, Vilela (BRA)
30 May 2018; 16:00		Report	1× (yellow card) 1× (suspension)	Coliseo Municipal Curubamba, Sacaba; Attendance: 200; Referees: De Souza, Vilela (BRA)

31 May 2018; 16:00	Uruguay	50–8	Peru	Coliseo Municipal Curubamba, Sacaba; Attendance: 420; Referees: De Souza, Vilela (BRA)
31 May 2018; 16:00	Faedo 8	(24–6)	Mori 3	Coliseo Municipal Curubamba, Sacaba; Attendance: 420; Referees: De Souza, Vilela (BRA)
31 May 2018; 16:00	2× (yellow card)	Report	3× (suspension)	Coliseo Municipal Curubamba, Sacaba; Attendance: 420; Referees: De Souza, Vilela (BRA)

=== Knockout stage ===
==== Bracket ====
Semifinals
30 May
Brazil	30
Chile	16
30 May
Argentina	23
Paraguay	21

Final
31 May
Brazil	26
Argentina	12
Third place
31 May
Chile	31
Paraguay	25

==== Semifinals ====
30 May 2018; 18:00	Brazil	30–16	Chile	Coliseo Municipal Curubamba, Sacaba; Referees: Paolantoni, García (ARG)
30 May 2018; 18:00	three players 5	(13–7)	Lovera 5	Coliseo Municipal Curubamba, Sacaba; Referees: Paolantoni, García (ARG)
30 May 2018; 18:00	4× (yellow card) 4× (suspension)	Report	1× (yellow card) 3× (suspension)	Coliseo Municipal Curubamba, Sacaba; Referees: Paolantoni, García (ARG)

30 May 2018; 20:00	Argentina	23–21	Paraguay	Coliseo Municipal Curubamba, Sacaba; Referees: González, Prieto (URU)
30 May 2018; 20:00	Mendoza 6	(12–11)	Fiore 5	Coliseo Municipal Curubamba, Sacaba; Referees: González, Prieto (URU)
30 May 2018; 20:00	3× (yellow card) 5× (suspension)	Report	1× (yellow card) 4× (suspension)	Coliseo Municipal Curubamba, Sacaba; Referees: González, Prieto (URU)

==== Bronze medal game ====
31 May 2018; 18:00	Chile	31–25	Paraguay	Coliseo Municipal Curubamba, Sacaba; Attendance: 600; Referees: Paolantoni, García (ARG)
31 May 2018; 18:00	Lovera 7	(16–13)	Fiore 7	Coliseo Municipal Curubamba, Sacaba; Attendance: 600; Referees: Paolantoni, García (ARG)
31 May 2018; 18:00	4× (yellow card) 6× (suspension)	Report	3× (yellow card) 3× (suspension)	Coliseo Municipal Curubamba, Sacaba; Attendance: 600; Referees: Paolantoni, García (ARG)

==== Gold medal game ====
31 May 2018; 20:00	Brazil	26–12	Argentina	Coliseo Municipal Curubamba, Sacaba; Referees: González, Prieto (URU)
31 May 2018; 20:00	Anastácio, Costa 5	(12–5)	Campigli 3	Coliseo Municipal Curubamba, Sacaba; Referees: González, Prieto (URU)
31 May 2018; 20:00	3× (yellow card) 6× (suspension)	Report	4× (yellow card) 3× (suspension)	Coliseo Municipal Curubamba, Sacaba; Referees: González, Prieto (URU)

=== Final standing ===
Rank	Team
1st place, gold medalist(s)	Brazil
2nd place, silver medalist(s)	Argentina
3rd place, bronze medalist(s)	Chile
4	Paraguay
5	Uruguay
6	Peru
7	Bolivia

Team qualified to the 2019 Pan American Games
