= Luís Ricardo Nascimento =

Brazilian handball player (born 1981)

Personal information
- Nationality: Brazilian
- Born: 24 September 1981 (age 45)
- Height: 2.00 m (6 ft 7 in)

Sport
- Sport: Handball
- Position: Goalkeeper
- Current club: Handebol Clube Taubaté
National team
Years	Team	Apps	(Gls)
–	Brazil	103	(0)

Luís Ricardo Nascimento (born 24 September 1981) is a Brazilian handball player for Handebol Clube Taubaté and the Brazilian national team.

== Achievements ==
- Pan American Men's Club Handball Championship:
  - 2014, 2015, 2016, 2018
- South and Central American Men's Club Handball Championship:
  - 2019
