= 2013 Pan American Men's Club Handball Championship =

Tournament details
- Host country: Brazil
- Venue(s): 1 (in 1 host city)
- Dates: 19 – 23 June
- Teams: 8 (from 1 confederation)

Final positions
- Champions: (Brazil) Handebol Taubaté (1st title)
- Runner-up: (Brazil) EC Pinheiros
- Third place: (Brazil) Metodista
- Fourth place: (Argentina) Club Atlético River Plate

Tournament statistics
- Matches played: 20
- Goals scored: 1,031 (51.55 per match)
- Top scorer(s): (Uruguay) German School of Montevideo; Alejandro Velazco (31 goals)

Awards
- Best player: (Brazil) Handebol Taubaté; Maik Ferreira do Santos

The 2013 Pan American Men's Club Handball Championship took place in Taubaté from 19 to 23 June. It acts as the Pan American qualifying tournament for the 2013 IHF Super Globe.

== Teams ==
Locations of the 2013 Pan American Men's Club Handball Championship participians
- (Argentina) Club Atlético River Plate
- (Argentina) SAG Villa Ballester
- (Chile) Santiago Steels
- (Brazil) EC Pinheiros
- (Brazil) Metodista
- (Brazil) Handebol Taubaté
- (Paraguay) Universidad Americana
- (Uruguay) German School of Montevideo

== Modus ==
The seven teams played in two groups a round Robin.

The two last from each group played the 5-8 place semifinals.

The loser of this played the 7 place game and the winners the 5th place game.

The first from each group played against the second from the other group the Semifinals.

The losers of the semis played Third place game and the winners the Final.

== Round robin ==
=== Group A ===
Team	Pld	W	D	L	GF	GA	GD	Pts
(Brazil) Metodista	3	3	0	0	106	41	+65	6
(Argentina) Club Atlético River Plate	3	1	1	1	74	60	+14	3
(Uruguay) German School of Montevideo	3	1	1	1	51	85	−34	3
(Paraguay) Universidad Americana	3	0	0	3	47	92	−45	0

June 19; 15:15	Club Atlético River Plate (Argentina)	22 – 22	(Uruguay) German School of Montevideo	Taubaté
June 19; 15:15	Portela 7	(10–9)	Velazco & Benitez 7	Taubaté
June 19; 15:15	4× (yellow card) 3× (suspension)	Report	3× (yellow card) 2× (suspension)	Taubaté

June 19; 17:30	Metodista (Brazil)	39 – 13	(Paraguay) Universidad Americana	Taubaté
June 19; 17:30	Teixeira 9	(15–5)	Ferreira 5	Taubaté
June 19; 17:30	3× (yellow card) 1× (suspension)	Report	2× (yellow card) 2× (suspension)	Taubaté

June 20; 13:00	Club Atlético River Plate (Argentina)	31 – 13	(Paraguay) Universidad Americana	Taubaté; Attendance: 81
June 20; 13:00	Schiaffino 7	(15–4)	Mendoza 4	Taubaté; Attendance: 81
June 20; 13:00	2× (yellow card) 3× (suspension)	Report	3× (yellow card) 3× (suspension)	Taubaté; Attendance: 81

June 20; 17:30	Metodista (Brazil)	42 – 7	(Uruguay) German School of Montevideo	Taubaté; Attendance: 200
June 20; 17:30	Cruz 10	(21–2)	Velazco 4	Taubaté; Attendance: 200
June 20; 17:30	3× (yellow card) 4× (suspension)	Report	1× (yellow card) 1× (suspension)	Taubaté; Attendance: 200

June 21; 13:00	Universidad Americana (Paraguay)	21 – 22	(Uruguay) German School of Montevideo	Taubaté; Attendance: 20
June 21; 13:00	Mendoza 6	(10–12)	Benitez 6	Taubaté; Attendance: 20
June 21; 13:00	3× (yellow card) 5× (suspension)	Report	3× (yellow card) 4× (suspension)	Taubaté; Attendance: 20

June 21; 15:15	Metodista (Brazil)	25 – 21	(Argentina) Club Atlético River Plate	Taubaté; Attendance: 220
June 21; 15:15	Teixeira 5	(10–7)	Alvarez 6	Taubaté; Attendance: 220
June 21; 15:15	3× (yellow card) 4× (suspension)	Report	4× (yellow card) 3× (suspension)	Taubaté; Attendance: 220

=== Group B ===
Team	Pld	W	D	L	GF	GA	GD	Pts
(Brazil) EC Pinheiros	3	3	0	0	104	74	+30	6
(Brazil) Handebol Taubaté	3	2	0	1	85	71	+14	4
(Argentina) SAG Villa Ballester	3	1	0	2	88	92	−4	2
(Chile) Santiago Steels	3	0	0	3	60	100	−40	0

June 19; 13:00	SAG Villa Ballester (Argentina)	31 – 27	(Chile) Santiago Steels	Taubaté; Attendance: 86
June 19; 13:00	Kogovsek 10	(15–14)	Callejas & Diaz 6	Taubaté; Attendance: 86
June 19; 13:00	3× (yellow card) 4× (suspension)	Report	3× (yellow card) 4× (suspension)	Taubaté; Attendance: 86

June 19; 20:00	EC Pinheiros (Brazil)	29 – 26	(Brazil) Handebol Taubaté	Taubaté
June 19; 20:00	Pacheco 7	(14–11)	Andre & Zepan 5	Taubaté
June 19; 20:00	3× (yellow card) 5× (suspension)	Report	4× (yellow card) 4× (suspension) 1× (red card)	Taubaté

June 20; 15:15	EC Pinheiros (Brazil)	40 – 16	(Chile) Santiago Steels	Taubaté
June 20; 15:15	Medeiros 8	(19–6)	Del Rio 4	Taubaté
June 20; 15:15	3× (yellow card) 3× (suspension)	Report	4× (yellow card) 6× (suspension)	Taubaté

June 20; 20:00	SAG Villa Ballester (Argentina)	25 – 30	(Brazil) Handebol Taubaté	Taubaté; Attendance: 250
June 20; 20:00	Cánepa 6	(10–10)	Zepan 6	Taubaté; Attendance: 250
June 20; 20:00	3× (yellow card) 4× (suspension)	Report	3× (yellow card) 6× (suspension) 1× (red card)	Taubaté; Attendance: 250

June 21; 17:30	EC Pinheiros (Brazil)	35 – 32	(Argentina) SAG Villa Ballester	Taubaté; Attendance: 200
June 21; 17:30	Pacheco 10	(19–17)	Scovenna 8	Taubaté; Attendance: 200
June 21; 17:30	3× (yellow card) 7× (suspension)	Report	3× (yellow card) 4× (suspension)	Taubaté; Attendance: 200

June 21; 20:00	Handebol Taubaté (Brazil)	29 – 17	(Chile) Santiago Steels	Taubaté; Attendance: 280
June 21; 20:00	Diégo 6	(14–10)	Callejas & Del Rio 4	Taubaté; Attendance: 280
June 21; 20:00	3× (yellow card) 4× (suspension)	Report	3× (yellow card) 4× (suspension)	Taubaté; Attendance: 280

=== Championship ===
Semifinals
B1	(Brazil) EC Pinheiros	25
A2	(Argentina) Club Atlético River Plate	20
A1	(Brazil) Metodista	26
B2	(Brazil) Handebol Taubaté	32

Final
B1	(Brazil) EC Pinheiros	23
B2	(Brazil) Handebol Taubaté	25
Small Final
A2	(Argentina) Club Atlético River Plate	23
A1	(Brazil) Metodista	28

==== Semifinals ====
June 22; 15:00	EC Pinheiros (Brazil)	25 – 20	(Argentina) Club Atlético River Plate	Taubaté
June 22; 15:00	Partrianova 7	(11–7)	3 players 4	Taubaté
June 22; 15:00	3× (yellow card) 6× (suspension)	Report	4× (yellow card) 4× (suspension)	Taubaté

June 22; 14:30	Metodista (Brazil)	32 – 26	(Brazil) Handebol Taubaté	Taubaté
June 22; 14:30	Gomes 8	(12–17)	Toko 9	Taubaté
June 22; 14:30	2× (yellow card) 4× (suspension) 1× (red card)	Report	4× (yellow card) 2× (suspension)	Taubaté

==== Small Final ====
June 23; 8:30	Club Atlético River Plate (Argentina)	23 – 28	(Brazil) Metodista	Taubaté

==== Final ====
June 23; 11:00	EC Pinheiros (Brazil)	23 – 25	(Brazil) Handebol Taubaté	Taubaté
June 23; 11:00		(12 - 12)		Taubaté

=== Placement Games ===
5th–8th Semifinals
B3	(Argentina) SAG Villa Ballester	29
A4	(Paraguay) Universidad Americana	16
A3	(Uruguay) German School of Montevideo	22
B4	(Chile) Santiago Steels	28

5th place
B3	(Argentina) SAG Villa Ballester	32
B4	(Chile) Santiago Steels	27
7th place
A4	(Paraguay) Universidad Americana	29
A3	(Uruguay) German School of Montevideo	37

==== 5th–8th Semifinals ====
June 22; 8:30	SAG Villa Ballester (Argentina)	29 – 16	(Paraguay) Universidad Americana	Taubaté; Attendance: 50
June 22; 8:30	Nebuloni 11	(15–11)	Mendoza 7	Taubaté; Attendance: 50
June 22; 8:30	3× (yellow card) 1× (suspension)	Report p.4	3× (yellow card) 4× (suspension)	Taubaté; Attendance: 50

June 22; 10:30	German School of Montevideo (Uruguay)	22 – 28	(Chile) Santiago Steels	Taubaté; Attendance: 50
June 22; 10:30	Velazco 9	(13–10)	Callejas 7	Taubaté; Attendance: 50
June 22; 10:30	3× (yellow card) 2× (suspension)	Report	3× (yellow card)	Taubaté; Attendance: 50

==== 7th place game ====
June 23; 13:30	Universidad Americana (Paraguay)	23 – 37	(Uruguay) German School of Montevideo	Taubaté
June 23; 13:30		(11-19)		Taubaté

==== 5th place game ====
June 23; 15:30	SAG Villa Ballester (Argentina)	32 – 27	(Chile) Santiago Steels	Taubaté
June 23; 15:30		(18 - 11)		Taubaté

== Final standing ==
Rank	Team
Gold medal	(Brazil) Handebol Taubaté
Silver medal	(Brazil) EC Pinheiros
Bronze medal	(Brazil) Metodista
4	(Argentina) Club Atlético River Plate
5	(Argentina) SAG Villa Ballester
6	(Chile) Santiago Steels
7	(Uruguay) German School of Montevideo
8	(Paraguay) Universidad Americana

Team qualified to the 2013 IHF Super Globe

== Awards ==
Most Valuable Player:	Maik dos Santos	(Brazil) Handebol Taubaté
Best Defensive:	Alexandro Pozzer	(Brazil) EC Pinheiros
Best Coach:	Tata Marcus	(Brazil) Handebol Taubaté

== Top scorers ==
Record

Rank	Name	Goals	Games	Average	Team
1st place, gold medalist(s)	Alejandro Velazco	31	5	6.2	(Uruguay) German School of Montevideo
2nd place, silver medalist(s)	Juan Benítez	28	5	5.6	(Uruguay) German School of Montevideo
3rd place, bronze medalist(s)	Fernando Pacheco	25	5	5	(Brazil) EC Pinheiros
3rd place, bronze medalist(s)	Andrés Kogovsek	25	5	5	(Argentina) SAG Villa Ballester
3rd place, bronze medalist(s)	José Mendonca	25	5	5	(Paraguay) Universidad Americana

== All-Star Team ==
Pivot

Andre Luis Toko

(Brazil) Handebol Taubaté

Center Back

Left Back
Matías Lima
Right Back

Arthur Patrianova
(Argentina) Club Atlético River Plate
Daniel Zepan

(Brazil) EC Pinheiros

(Brazil) Handebol Taubaté

Left Wing

Goalkeeper

Right Wing
Arthur Sousa

Maik Santos

Andrés Kogovsek
(Brazil) EC Pinheiros

(Brazil) Handebol Taubaté

(Argentina) SAG Villa Ballester

Most Valuable Player

3rd Top Scorer
