= Cléber Andrade =

Brazilian handball player (born 1994)

Personal information
- Full name: Cléber Antonio de Andrade
- Nationality: Brazilian
- Born: 14 June 1994 (age 32)
- Height: 1.85 m (6 ft 1 in)

Sport
- Sport: Handball
- Position: Left wing
- Current club: HC Taubaté
National team
- Years: Team
- –: Brazil
Medal record
South and Central American Championship
Gold medal – first place	2022 Brazil
Silver medal – second place	2020 Brazil
Pan American Junior Championship
Gold medal – first place	2015 Brazil

Cléber Antonio de Andrade (born 14 June 1994) is a Brazilian handball player for HC Taubaté and the Brazilian national team.

He participated at the 2021 World Men's Handball Championship.

== Titles ==
- Pan American Men's Club Handball Championship:
  - 2013, 2014, 2015, 2016, 2018
- South and Central American Men's Club Handball Championship:
  - 2019, 2022, 2024
