= Maik dos Santos =

Brazilian handball player (born 1980)

Maik Santos
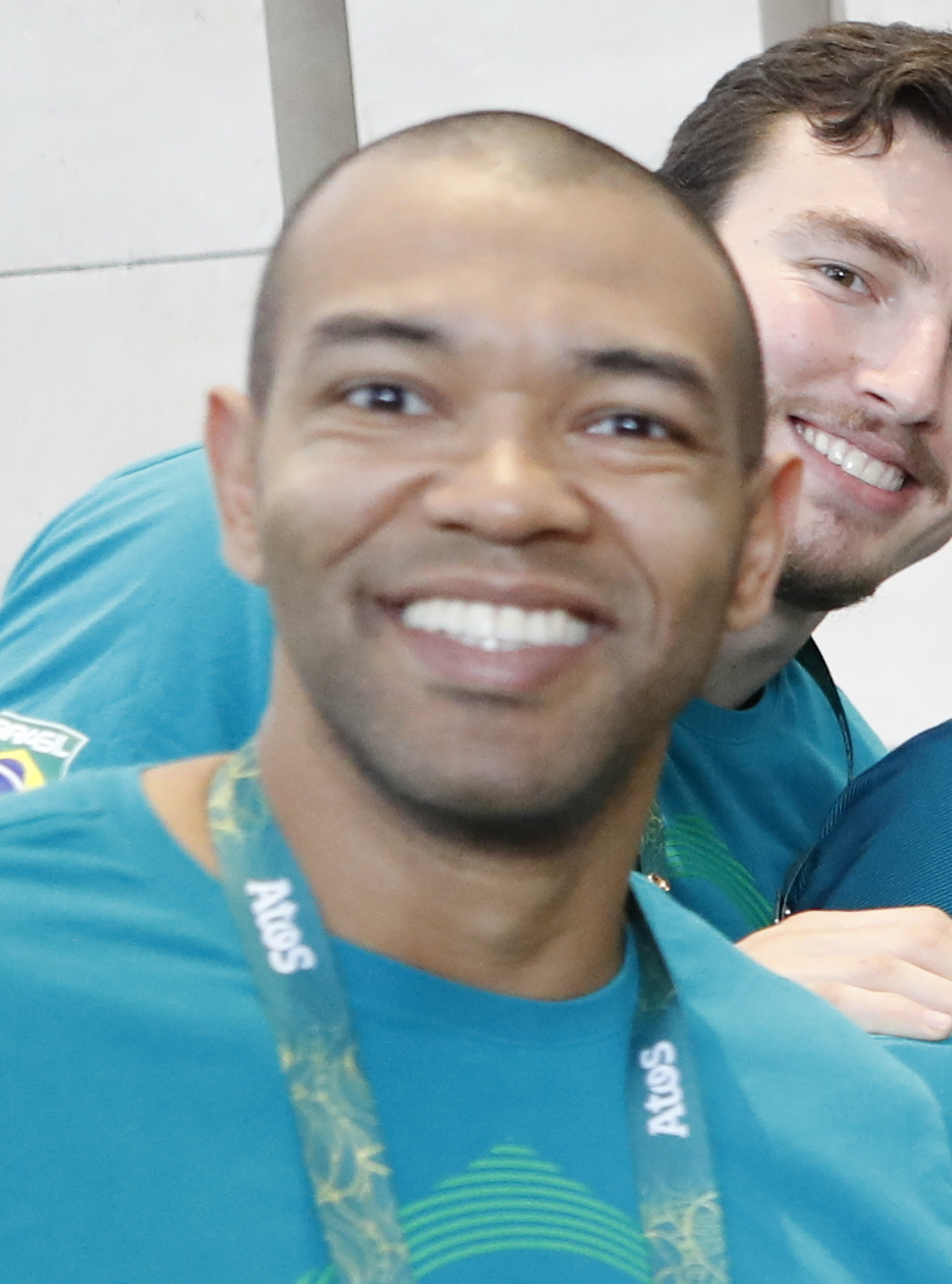
- Dos Santos in 2016

Personal information
- Full name: Maik Ferreira dos Santos
- Born: 6 September 1980 (age 46) São Paulo, Brazil
- Height: 1.80 m (5 ft 11 in)

Sport
- Sport: Handball
- Position: Goalkeeper
- Current club: Handebol Taubaté
National team
Years	Team	Apps	(Gls)
–	Brazil	212	(6)
Medal record
Pan American Games
Gold medal – first place	2007 Rio de Janeiro	Team
Gold medal – first place	2015 Toronto	Team
Silver medal – second place	2011 Guadalajara	Team
Pan American Championship
Gold medal – first place	2016 Argentina
Silver medal – second place	2010 Chile
Silver medal – second place	2014 Uruguay

Maik Ferreira dos Santos (born 6 September 1980) is a Brazilian handball goalkeeper for Al-Rayan and the Brazilian handball team.

He won a gold medal at the 2015 Pan American Games and competed at the Summer Olympics in 2008 and 2016 and at the world championships in 2003, 2007 and 2009.

His elder brother Marcos Paulo Santos and wife Lucila Vianna da Silva are also Olympic handball players, while his daughter wishes to become one.

== Titles ==
- Pan American Men's Club Handball Championship:
  - 2011,
  - 2013,
  - 2014, 2015, 2016, 2018
- South and Central American Men's Club Handball Championship:
  - 2019, 2022

== Individual awards and achievements ==
Best Goalkeeper

- 2015 Pan American Men's Club Handball Championship
- 2016 Pan American Men's Club Handball Championship
