= André Soares (handballer) =

Brazilian handball player (born 1984)

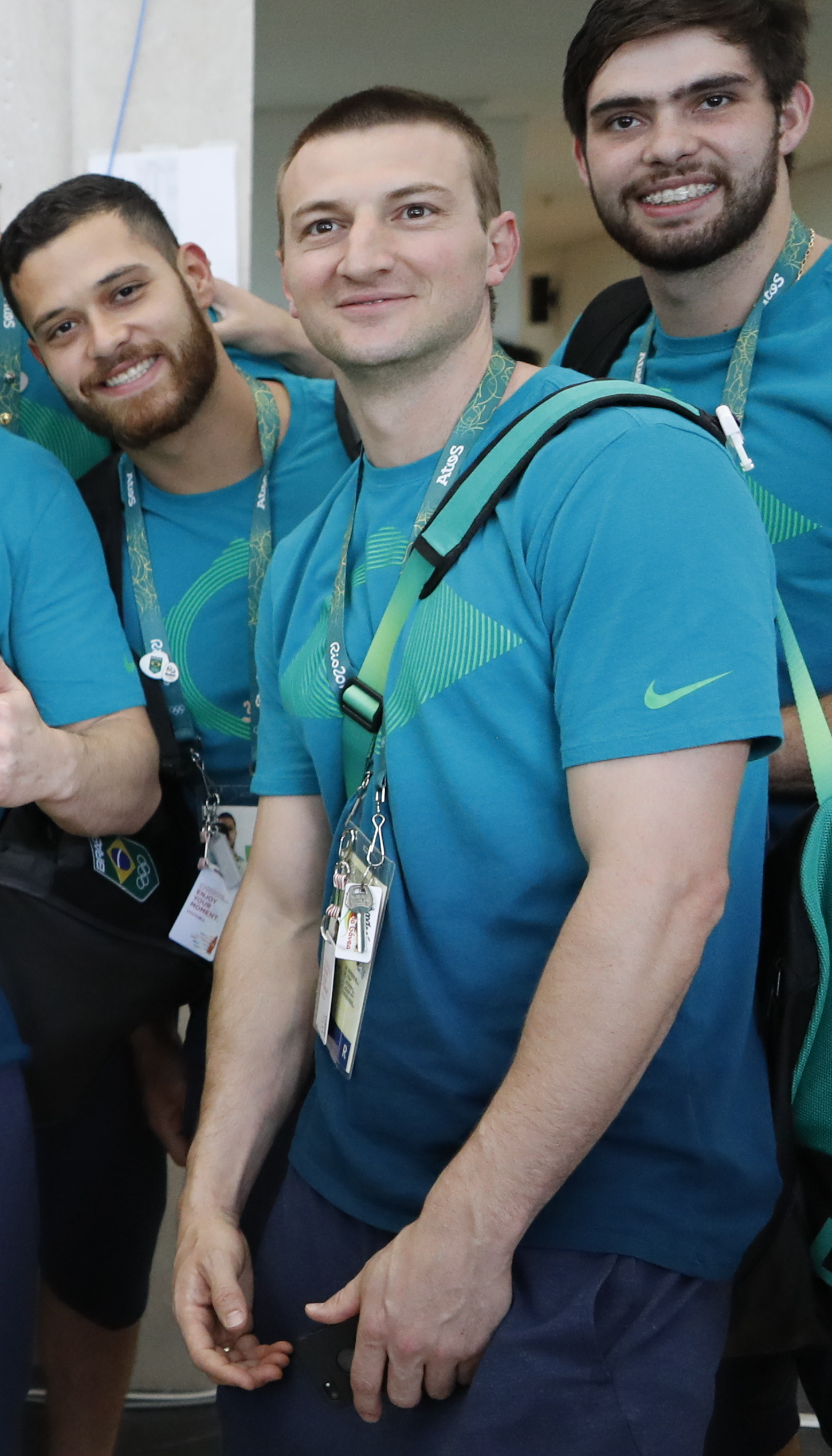
- Soares in 2016

Personal information
- Nationality: Brazilian
- Born: 13 February 1984 (age 42)
- Height: 1.94 m (6 ft 4 in)

Sport
- Sport: Handball
- Position: Left wing
- Current club: HC Taubaté
- Number: 2
National team
Years	Team	Apps	(Gls)
–	Brazil	51	(85)
Medal record
Pan American Games
Gold medal – first place	2015 Toronto	Team
Pan American Championship
Gold medal – first place	2016 Argentina
Silver medal – second place	2018 Greenland

André Soares (born 13 February 1984) is a Brazilian handball player for HC Taubaté and the Brazilian handball team. He won a gold medal at the 2015 Pan American Games and competed at the 2016 Olympics.

== Titles ==
- South and Central American Men's Club Handball Championship:
- 2019
- Pan American Men's Club Handball Championship:
- 2013, 2014, 2015, 2016, 2018
- Campeonato Paulista de Handebol Masculino:
- 2015
- Liga Nacional Masculina
- 2013, 2014, 2016
- Jogos Abertos do Interior
- 2014
- Jogos Regionais
- 2010, 2011, 2012, 2013, 2014, 2015
- Aquece Rio
- 2016

== Individual awards and achievements ==
- 2017 Pan American Men's Club Handball Championship: Best left wing
