= 2024 South and Central American Men's Club Handball Championship =

Tournament details
- Host country: Brazil
- Venue: 1 (in 1 host city)
- Dates: 28 May – 1 June
- Teams: 12 (from 1 confederation)

Final positions
- Champions: (Brazil) Handebol Taubaté (3rd title)
- Runners-up: (Brazil) EC Pinheiros
- Third place: (Brazil) Nacional Handebol Clube
- Fourth place: (Argentina) San Fernando HB

Tournament statistics
- Matches played: 30

The 2024 South and Central American Men's Club Handball Championship the 5th edition of this tournament was held in Taubaté, Brazil from 28 May to 1 June 2024. It acted as a qualifying tournament for the 2024 IHF Men's Super Globe.

== Participating teams ==
- (Argentina) River Plate
- (Argentina) San Fernando HB
- (Argentina) Universitario
- (Argentina) Colegio Ward
- (Brazil) Nacional Handebol Clube
- (Brazil) EC Pinheiros
- (Brazil) Handebol Taubaté
- (Brazil) Praia Clube
- (Chile) LN Maipú
- (Chile) MET Handball
- (Peru) Partille Club
- (Uruguay) Colegio Alemán

== Preliminary round ==
All times are local (UTC–3).

=== Group A ===
Pos	Team	Pld	W	D	L	GF	GA	GD	Pts	Qualification
1	(Brazil) Handebol Taubaté (H)	3	3	0	0	123	49	+74	6	Semifinals
2	(Brazil) Nacional Handebol Clube	3	2	0	1	127	65	+62	4	Semifinals
3	(Uruguay) Colegio Alemán	3	1	0	2	75	115	−40	2	5–8th place semifinals
4	(Peru) Partille Club	3	0	0	3	43	139	−96	0	9–12th place semifinals

Source: Handball SCA
(H) Hosts

28 May; 16:00	Nacional Handebol Clube (Brazil)	55–13	(Peru) Partille Club	Ginásio Emecal, Taubaté; Attendance: 140; Referees: Aguilera & Gutierrez (CHI)
28 May; 16:00	Januário 8	(28–7)	Trelles 6	Ginásio Emecal, Taubaté; Attendance: 140; Referees: Aguilera & Gutierrez (CHI)
28 May; 16:00	1× (yellow card) 2× (suspension)	Report	2× (suspension)	Ginásio Emecal, Taubaté; Attendance: 140; Referees: Aguilera & Gutierrez (CHI)

28 May; 20:00	Handebol Taubaté (Brazil)	47–15	(Uruguay) Colegio Alemán	Ginásio Emecal, Taubaté; Attendance: 370; Referees: Ramalho & Santana (BRA)
28 May; 20:00	Santos 10	(23–8)	Goldfinger & Castro 3	Ginásio Emecal, Taubaté; Attendance: 370; Referees: Ramalho & Santana (BRA)
28 May; 20:00	2× (yellow card) 5× (suspension)	Report		Ginásio Emecal, Taubaté; Attendance: 370; Referees: Ramalho & Santana (BRA)

29 May; 14:00	Colegio Alemán (Uruguay)	27–48	(Brazil) Nacional Handebol Clube	Ginásio Emecal, Taubaté; Referees: Zuñiga & Reyes (CUB)
29 May; 14:00	Martin 5	(13–24)	Araujo 8	Ginásio Emecal, Taubaté; Referees: Zuñiga & Reyes (CUB)
29 May; 14:00	1× (yellow card) 3× (suspension)	Report	2× (yellow card) 4× (suspension)	Ginásio Emecal, Taubaté; Referees: Zuñiga & Reyes (CUB)

29 May; 20:00	Handebol Taubaté (Brazil)	51–10	(Peru) Partille Club	Ginásio Emecal, Taubaté; Attendance: 160; Referees: Magalhaes & Godoy (BRA)
29 May; 20:00	Santos 10	(23–5)	Maldonado 3	Ginásio Emecal, Taubaté; Attendance: 160; Referees: Magalhaes & Godoy (BRA)
29 May; 20:00	1× (yellow card) 4× (suspension)	Report	2× (suspension) 1× (red card)	Ginásio Emecal, Taubaté; Attendance: 160; Referees: Magalhaes & Godoy (BRA)

30 May; 10:00	Colegio Alemán (Uruguay)	33–20	(Peru) Partille Club	Ginásio Emecal, Taubaté; Attendance: 50; Referees: Aguilera & Gutierrez (CHI)
30 May; 10:00	Martin & Goldfinger 6	(10–8)	López	Ginásio Emecal, Taubaté; Attendance: 50; Referees: Aguilera & Gutierrez (CHI)
30 May; 10:00	1× (yellow card) 2× (suspension)	Report	1× (yellow card) 2× (suspension)	Ginásio Emecal, Taubaté; Attendance: 50; Referees: Aguilera & Gutierrez (CHI)

30 May; 18:00	Handebol Taubaté (Brazil)	25–24	(Brazil) Nacional Handebol Clube	Ginásio Emecal, Taubaté; Attendance: 600; Referees: Magalhaes & Godoy (BRA)
30 May; 18:00	Andrade 9	(14–16)	Santos 7	Ginásio Emecal, Taubaté; Attendance: 600; Referees: Magalhaes & Godoy (BRA)
30 May; 18:00	3× (yellow card) 3× (suspension)	Report	1× (yellow card) 4× (suspension)	Ginásio Emecal, Taubaté; Attendance: 600; Referees: Magalhaes & Godoy (BRA)

=== Group B ===
Pos	Team	Pld	W	D	L	GF	GA	GD	Pts	Qualification
1	(Brazil) EC Pinheiros	3	3	0	0	109	67	+42	6	Semifinals
2	(Argentina) Colegio Ward	3	2	0	1	79	73	+6	4	5–8th place semifinals
3	(Chile) LN Maipú	3	1	0	2	73	97	−24	2	5–8th place semifinals
4	(Chile) MET Handball	3	0	0	3	73	97	−24	0	9–12th place semifinal

Source: Handball SCA

28 May; 10:00	Colegio Ward (Argentina)	28–21	(Chile) MET Handball	Ginásio Emecal, Taubaté; Attendance: 130; Referees: Sosa & Lemes (URU)
28 May; 10:00	Silva 6	(11–7)	3 players 4	Ginásio Emecal, Taubaté; Attendance: 130; Referees: Sosa & Lemes (URU)
28 May; 10:00	2× (yellow card) 7× (suspension)	Report	2× (yellow card) 5× (suspension)	Ginásio Emecal, Taubaté; Attendance: 130; Referees: Sosa & Lemes (URU)

28 May; 14:00	EC Pinheiros (Brazil)	41–20	(Chile) LN Maipú	Ginásio Emecal, Taubaté; Attendance: 183; Referees: Zuñiga & Reyes (CUB)
28 May; 14:00	Reis 8	(20–10)	Delgado 10	Ginásio Emecal, Taubaté; Attendance: 183; Referees: Zuñiga & Reyes (CUB)
28 May; 14:00	3× (suspension)	Report	3× (suspension)	Ginásio Emecal, Taubaté; Attendance: 183; Referees: Zuñiga & Reyes (CUB)

29 May; 12:00	MET Handball (Chile)	24–37	(Brazil) EC Pinheiros	Ginásio Emecal, Taubaté; Attendance: 130; Referees: Petrone & Rueda (ARG)
29 May; 12:00	Feuchtmann 8	(16–21)	Santana & Seifert 7	Ginásio Emecal, Taubaté; Attendance: 130; Referees: Petrone & Rueda (ARG)
29 May; 12:00	2× (yellow card) 3× (suspension)	Report	1× (yellow card) 4× (suspension)	Ginásio Emecal, Taubaté; Attendance: 130; Referees: Petrone & Rueda (ARG)

29 May; 16:00	LN Maipú (Chile)	21–28	(Argentina) Colegio Ward	Ginásio Emecal, Taubaté; Attendance: 250; Referees: Aguilera & Gutierrez (CHI)
29 May; 16:00	Martínez 5	(14–12)	Silva 6	Ginásio Emecal, Taubaté; Attendance: 250; Referees: Aguilera & Gutierrez (CHI)
29 May; 16:00		Report	2× (suspension) 1× (red card)	Ginásio Emecal, Taubaté; Attendance: 250; Referees: Aguilera & Gutierrez (CHI)

30 May; 14:00	LN Maipú (Chile)	32–28	(Chile) MET Handball	Ginásio Emecal, Taubaté; Attendance: 140; Referees: Petrone & Rueda (ARG)
30 May; 14:00	Delgado 10	(16–14)	Gutierrez 7	Ginásio Emecal, Taubaté; Attendance: 140; Referees: Petrone & Rueda (ARG)
30 May; 14:00	1× (suspension)	Report	1× (yellow card) 2× (suspension)	Ginásio Emecal, Taubaté; Attendance: 140; Referees: Petrone & Rueda (ARG)

30 May; 16:00	EC Pinheiros (Brazil)	31–23	(Argentina) Colegio Ward	Ginásio Emecal, Taubaté; Attendance: 450; Referees: Grillo & Lenci (ARG)
30 May; 16:00	Seifert 11	(16–10)	Silva 7	Ginásio Emecal, Taubaté; Attendance: 450; Referees: Grillo & Lenci (ARG)
30 May; 16:00	1× (yellow card) 5× (suspension)	Report	1× (yellow card) 2× (suspension)	Ginásio Emecal, Taubaté; Attendance: 450; Referees: Grillo & Lenci (ARG)

=== Group C ===
Pos	Team	Pld	W	D	L	GF	GA	GD	Pts	Qualification
1	(Argentina) San Fernando HB	3	3	0	0	94	77	+17	6	Semifinals
2	(Brazil) Praia Clube	3	2	0	1	83	81	+2	4	5–8th place semifinals
3	(Argentina) Universitario	3	0	1	2	91	95	−4	1	9–12th place semifinal
4	(Argentina) River Plate	3	0	1	2	83	98	−15	1	9–12th place semifinal

Source: Handball SCA

28 May; 12:00	Praia Clube (Brazil)	29–28	(Argentina) Universitario	Ginásio Emecal, Taubaté; Referees: Petrone & Rueda (ARG)
28 May; 12:00	Felipe 9	(16–14)	Piatti 7	Ginásio Emecal, Taubaté; Referees: Petrone & Rueda (ARG)
28 May; 12:00	2× (yellow card) 2× (suspension) 1× (red card)	Report	2× (yellow card) 2× (suspension)	Ginásio Emecal, Taubaté; Referees: Petrone & Rueda (ARG)

28 May; 18:00	San Fernando HB (Argentina)	33–25	(Argentina) River Plate	Ginásio Emecal, Taubaté; Referees: Magalhaes & Godoy (BRA)
28 May; 18:00	Soto 7	(16–11)	Gallardo	Ginásio Emecal, Taubaté; Referees: Magalhaes & Godoy (BRA)
28 May; 18:00	2× (suspension)	Report	3× (suspension)	Ginásio Emecal, Taubaté; Referees: Magalhaes & Godoy (BRA)

29 May; 10:00	Universitario (Argentina)	30–33	(Argentina) San Fernando HB	Ginásio Emecal, Taubaté; Attendance: 100; Referees: Sosa & Lemes (URU)
29 May; 10:00	Endrek 7	(14–20)	Rottenbucher 7	Ginásio Emecal, Taubaté; Attendance: 100; Referees: Sosa & Lemes (URU)
29 May; 10:00	2× (yellow card) 5× (suspension) 1× (red card)	Report	2× (yellow card) 2× (suspension) 1× (red card)	Ginásio Emecal, Taubaté; Attendance: 100; Referees: Sosa & Lemes (URU)

29 May; 18:00	River Plate (Argentina)	25–32	(Brazil) Praia Clube	Ginásio Emecal, Taubaté; Attendance: 250; Referees: Grillo & Lenci (ARG)
29 May; 18:00	Miguez & Gallardo 6	(13–15)	Santos 11	Ginásio Emecal, Taubaté; Attendance: 250; Referees: Grillo & Lenci (ARG)
29 May; 18:00	2× (yellow card) 6× (suspension)	Report	5× (suspension)	Ginásio Emecal, Taubaté; Attendance: 250; Referees: Grillo & Lenci (ARG)

30 May; 12:00	River Plate (Argentina)	33–33	(Argentina) Universitario	Ginásio Emecal, Taubaté; Referees: Ramalho & Santana (BRA)
30 May; 12:00	Gallardo 9	(12–21)	Rezinovsky 7	Ginásio Emecal, Taubaté; Referees: Ramalho & Santana (BRA)
30 May; 12:00	3× (yellow card) 1× (suspension)	Report	1× (yellow card) 2× (suspension)	Ginásio Emecal, Taubaté; Referees: Ramalho & Santana (BRA)

30 May; 20:00	San Fernando HB (Argentina)	28–22	(Brazil) Praia Clube	Ginásio Emecal, Taubaté; Attendance: 320; Referees: Sosa & Lemes (URU)
30 May; 20:00	Fernández 6	(13–10)	Felipe 8	Ginásio Emecal, Taubaté; Attendance: 320; Referees: Sosa & Lemes (URU)
30 May; 20:00	1× (yellow card) 3× (suspension) 1× (red card)	Report	1× (yellow card) 8× (suspension)	Ginásio Emecal, Taubaté; Attendance: 320; Referees: Sosa & Lemes (URU)

== Knockout stage ==
=== Bracket ===
9–12th place semifinals
C4	(Argentina) River Plate	29
B4	(Chile) MET Handball	24
C3	(Argentina) Universitario	43
A4	(Peru) Partille Club	23

Ninth place
C4	(Argentina) River Plate	35
C3	(Argentina) Universitario	28
Eleventh place
B4	(Chile) MET Handball	43
A41	(Peru) Partille Club	26

5–8th place semifinals
C2	(Brazil) Praia Clube	36
B3	(Chile) LN Maipú	17
B2	(Argentina) Colegio Ward	37
A3	(Uruguay) Colegio Alemán	32

Fifth place
C2	(Brazil) Praia Clube	28
B2	(Argentina) Colegio Ward	27
Seventh place
B3	(Chile) LN Maipú	29
A3	(Uruguay) Colegio Alemán	25

Semifinals
A1	(Brazil) Handebol Taubaté	26
A2	(Brazil) Nacional Handebol Clube	21
B1	(Brazil) EC Pinheiros	30
C1	(Argentina) San Fernando HB	21

Finals
A1	(Brazil) Handebol Taubaté	29
B1	(Brazil) EC Pinheiros	27
Third place
A2	(Brazil) Nacional Handebol Clube	37
C1	(Argentina) San Fernando HB	35

=== 9–12th place semifinals ===
31 May; 09:00	River Plate (Argentina)	29–24	(Chile) MET Handball	Ginásio Emecal, Taubaté; Attendance: 110; Referees: Zuñiga & Reyes (CUB)
31 May; 09:00	Arrom 10	(13–14)	Feuchtmann 7	Ginásio Emecal, Taubaté; Attendance: 110; Referees: Zuñiga & Reyes (CUB)
31 May; 09:00	1× (yellow card) 2× (suspension)	Report	3× (suspension)	Ginásio Emecal, Taubaté; Attendance: 110; Referees: Zuñiga & Reyes (CUB)

31 May; 11:00	Universitario (Argentina)	43–23	(Peru) Partille Club	Ginásio Emecal, Taubaté; Attendance: 244; Referees: Ramalho & Santana (BRA)
31 May; 11:00	Endrek 12	(21–13)	Gutelius 12	Ginásio Emecal, Taubaté; Attendance: 244; Referees: Ramalho & Santana (BRA)
31 May; 11:00	3× (suspension)	Report	2× (suspension)	Ginásio Emecal, Taubaté; Attendance: 244; Referees: Ramalho & Santana (BRA)

=== 5–8th place semifinals ===
31 May; 13:00	Praia Clube (Brazil)	36–17	(Chile) LN Maipú	Ginásio Emecal, Taubaté; Attendance: 110; Referees: Petrone & Rueda (ARG)
31 May; 13:00	Mendes 8	(10–10)	Vera 4	Ginásio Emecal, Taubaté; Attendance: 110; Referees: Petrone & Rueda (ARG)
31 May; 13:00	14× (yellow card) 2× (suspension)	Report	3× (suspension)	Ginásio Emecal, Taubaté; Attendance: 110; Referees: Petrone & Rueda (ARG)

31 May; 15:00	Colegio Ward (Argentina)	37–32	(Uruguay) Colegio Alemán	Ginásio Emecal, Taubaté; Attendance: 150; Referees: Aguilera & Gutierrez (CHI)
31 May; 15:00	Benacedo 7	(18–18)	Martin 8	Ginásio Emecal, Taubaté; Attendance: 150; Referees: Aguilera & Gutierrez (CHI)
31 May; 15:00	1× (yellow card) 7× (suspension) 1× (red card)	Report	1× (yellow card) 3× (suspension) 1× (red card)	Ginásio Emecal, Taubaté; Attendance: 150; Referees: Aguilera & Gutierrez (CHI)

=== Semifinals ===
31 May; 17:00	EC Pinheiros (Brazil)	30–21	(Argentina) San Fernando HB	Ginásio Emecal, Taubaté; Attendance: 355; Referees: Grillo & Lenci (ARG)
31 May; 17:00	Seifert 7	(17–11)	Cánepa 5	Ginásio Emecal, Taubaté; Attendance: 355; Referees: Grillo & Lenci (ARG)
31 May; 17:00	1× (yellow card) 1× (suspension) 1× (red card)	Report	1× (yellow card) 3× (suspension)	Ginásio Emecal, Taubaté; Attendance: 355; Referees: Grillo & Lenci (ARG)

31 May; 20:00	Handebol Taubaté (Brazil)	26–21	(Brazil) Nacional Handebol Clube	Ginásio Emecal, Taubaté; Attendance: 600; Referees: Sosa & Lemes (URU)
31 May; 20:00	Santos 5	(15–10)	De Araujo 8	Ginásio Emecal, Taubaté; Attendance: 600; Referees: Sosa & Lemes (URU)
31 May; 20:00	2× (yellow card) 3× (suspension) 1× (red card)	Report	1× (yellow card) 3× (suspension)	Ginásio Emecal, Taubaté; Attendance: 600; Referees: Sosa & Lemes (URU)

=== Eleventh place game ===
1 June; 09:00	MET Handball (Chile)	43–26	(Peru) Partille Club	Ginásio Emecal, Taubaté; Attendance: 153; Referees: Ramalho & Santana (BRA)
1 June; 09:00	Feuchtmann & Martínez 7	(22–12)	Bambaren 6	Ginásio Emecal, Taubaté; Attendance: 153; Referees: Ramalho & Santana (BRA)
1 June; 09:00	1× (yellow card) 3× (suspension)	Report	3× (suspension)	Ginásio Emecal, Taubaté; Attendance: 153; Referees: Ramalho & Santana (BRA)

=== Ninth place game ===
1 June; 11:00	River Plate (Argentina)	35–28	(Argentina) Universitario	Ginásio Emecal, Taubaté; Attendance: 110; Referees: Petrone & Rueda (ARG)
1 June; 11:00	Rossetto 10	(17–13)	Zidarich 5	Ginásio Emecal, Taubaté; Attendance: 110; Referees: Petrone & Rueda (ARG)
1 June; 11:00	2× (yellow card) 6× (suspension) 1× (red card)	Report	4× (suspension)	Ginásio Emecal, Taubaté; Attendance: 110; Referees: Petrone & Rueda (ARG)

=== Seventh place game ===
1 June; 13:00	Colegio Alemán (Uruguay)	25–29	(Chile) LN Maipú	Ginásio Emecal, Taubaté; Referees: Zuñiga & Reyes (CUB)
1 June; 13:00	Martin 7	(10–12)	Huaracán 6	Ginásio Emecal, Taubaté; Referees: Zuñiga & Reyes (CUB)
1 June; 13:00	1× (yellow card) 3× (suspension)	Report	1× (suspension)	Ginásio Emecal, Taubaté; Referees: Zuñiga & Reyes (CUB)

=== Fifth place game ===
1 June; 15:00	Colegio Ward (Argentina)	27–28	(Brazil) Praia Clube	Ginásio Emecal, Taubaté; Referees: Magalhaes & Godoy (BRA)
1 June; 15:00	Silva & Garay 6	(17–16)	Mendes 6	Ginásio Emecal, Taubaté; Referees: Magalhaes & Godoy (BRA)
1 June; 15:00	2× (yellow card) 4× (suspension)	Report	1× (yellow card) 3× (suspension) 2× (red card)	Ginásio Emecal, Taubaté; Referees: Magalhaes & Godoy (BRA)

=== Third place game ===
1 June; 17:00	Nacional Handebol Clube (Brazil)	37–35	(Argentina) San Fernando HB	Ginásio Emecal, Taubaté; Referees: Sosa & Lemes (URU)
1 June; 17:00	De Araujo 12	(18–17)	Soto 6	Ginásio Emecal, Taubaté; Referees: Sosa & Lemes (URU)
1 June; 17:00	4× (suspension)	Report	1× (yellow card) 4× (suspension)	Ginásio Emecal, Taubaté; Referees: Sosa & Lemes (URU)

=== Final ===
1 June; 20:00	Handebol Taubaté (Brazil)	29–27	(Brazil) EC Pinheiros	Ginásio Emecal, Taubaté; Attendance: 800; Referees: Grillo & Lenci (ARG)
1 June; 20:00	Perrella 6	(15–11)	3 players 5	Ginásio Emecal, Taubaté; Attendance: 800; Referees: Grillo & Lenci (ARG)
1 June; 20:00	1× (yellow card) 3× (suspension)	Report	1× (yellow card) 2× (suspension)	Ginásio Emecal, Taubaté; Attendance: 800; Referees: Grillo & Lenci (ARG)

== Final standing ==
Rank	Team
Gold medal	(Brazil) Handebol Taubaté
Silver medal	(Brazil) EC Pinheiros
Bronze medal	(Brazil) Nacional Handebol Clube
4	(Argentina) San Fernando HB
5	(Brazil) Praia Clube
6	(Argentina) Colegio Ward
7	(Chile) LN Maipú
8	(Uruguay) Colegio Alemán
9	(Argentina) River Plate
10	(Argentina) Universitario
11	(Chile) MET Handball
12	(Peru) Partille Club

Team qualified to the 2024 IHF Men's Club World Championship

2024 South and Central American Men's Club Champions

Handebol Taubaté
Third title

Team roster: Lucas Santos, Washington Santos, Guilherme Gama, Cléber Andrade, Victor Menezes, Perdo Mota, Vinicius Perin, Guilherme Torriani, Pedro Saitx, Gabriel da Rosa, Vinícius Teixeira, Eduardo da Silva, Gustavo Andrade, Matheus Perrela, David Junior, William Santos.
Head coach: André Silva.
