= Fernando Pacheco Filho =

Brazilian handball player (born 1983)

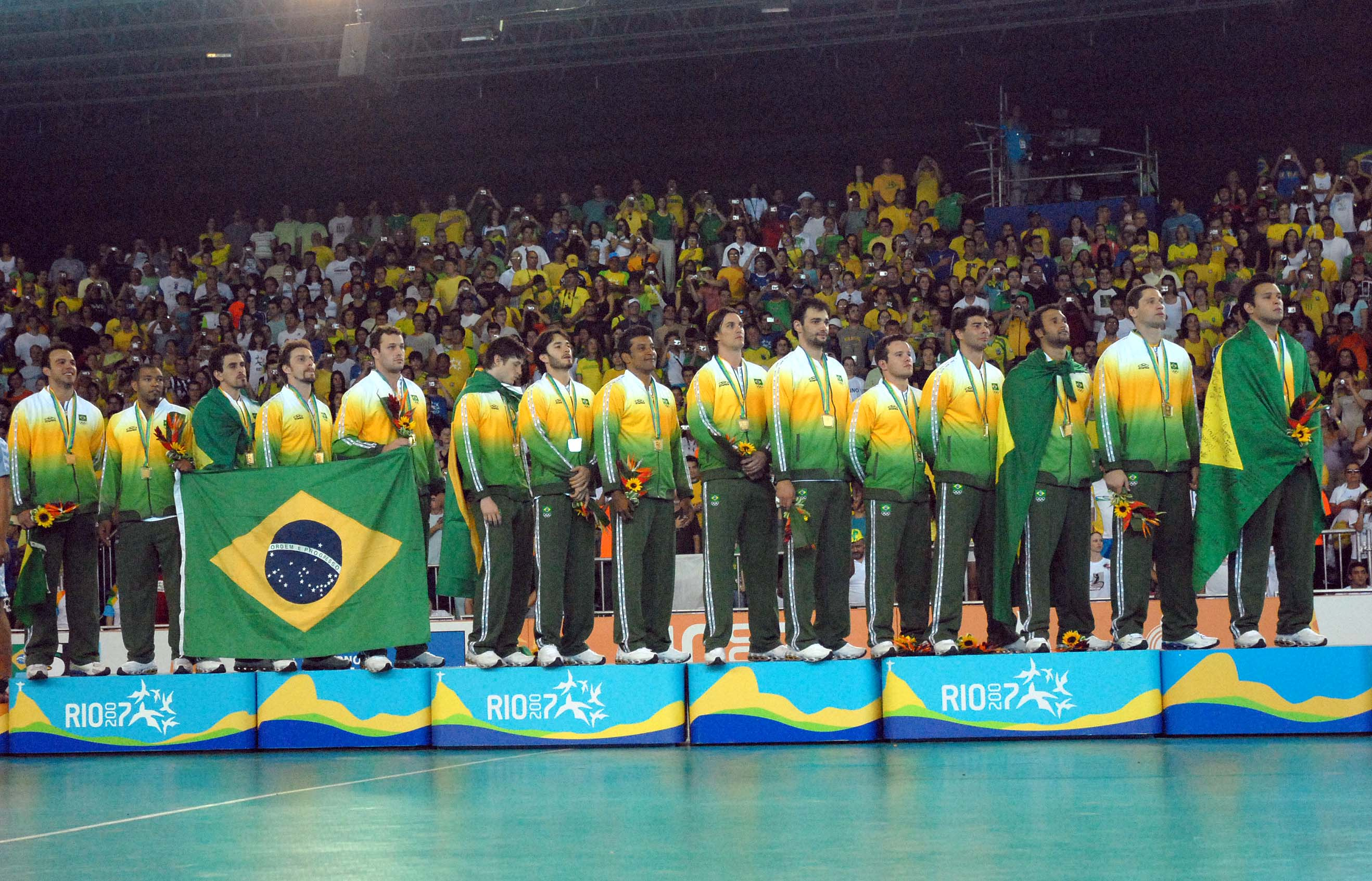
- On the podium after winning gold at the 2007 Pan American Games

Personal information
- Born: 25 May 1983 (age 43) Niterói, Brazil
- Height: 1.90 m (6 ft 3 in)

Sport
- Sport: Handball
- Position: Right back

Senior clubs
- Years: Team
- –: Sao Caetano
- –2015: EC Pinheiros
- 2015–2015: HC Taubaté
- 2015–2016: BM Granollers
- 2016–2017: BM Puerto Sagunto
- 2017–2018: EC Pinheiros
National team
Years	Team	Apps	(Gls)
–	Brazil	148	(455)
Medal record
Pan American Games
Gold medal – first place	2007 Rio de Janeiro	Team
Gold medal – first place	2015 Toronto	Team
Silver medal – second place	2011 Guadalajara	Team

Fernando Pacheco Filho also known as Zeba (born 25 May 1983) is a former Brazilian handball player who played for the Brazilian national team. He competed in the 2008 Summer Olympics, where the Brazilian team placed 11th.

== Achievements ==
- Pan American Men's Club Handball Championship:
  - 2015
