= Lucas Cândido (handballer) =

Brazilian handball player (born 1989)

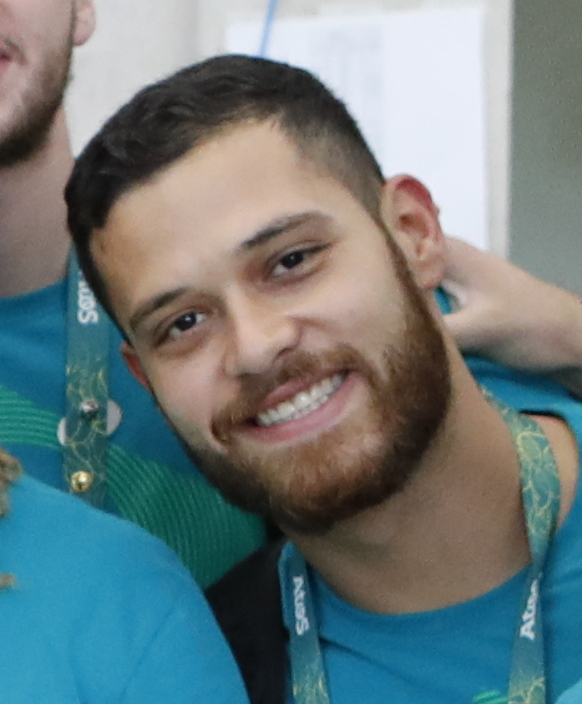
- Cândido in 2016

Personal information
- Full name: Lucas Benedito Cândido
- Born: 19 March 1989 (age 37) Guarulhos, Brazil
- Height: 1.85 m (6 ft 1 in)

Sport
- Sport: Handball
- Position: Right wing
- Current club: Ciudad de Guadalajara
- Number: 6
National team
Years	Team	Apps	(Gls)
–	Brazil	67	(110)
Medal record
Pan American Games
Gold medal – first place	2015 Toronto	Team
Pan American Championship
Gold medal – first place	2016 Argentina

Lucas Benedito Cândido (born 19 March 1989) is a Brazilian handball player for Ciudad de Guadalajara and the Brazilian handball team.

He won a gold medal at the 2015 Pan American Games and competed at the 2016 Summer Olympics and 2013 and 2015 world championships.

== Achievements ==
- Pan American Men's Club Handball Championship:
  - 2014, 2015, 2016
- South and Central American Men's Club Handball Championship:
  - 2019, 2021

== Individual awards and achievements ==
- 2016 Pan American Men's Club Handball Championship: Best right wing
