= 2016 IHF Super Globe =

Tournament details
- Host country: Qatar
- Venue: 1 (in 1 host city)
- Dates: 5–8 September
- Teams: 8 (from 5 confederations)

Final positions
- Champions: (Germany) Füchse Berlin (2nd title)
- Runners-up: (France) Paris Saint-Germain
- Third place: (Poland) Vive Targi Kielce
- Fourth place: (Qatar) Al Sadd

Tournament statistics
- Matches played: 12
- Goals scored: 677 (56.42 per match)
- Top scorer: (Tunisia) Anis Mahmoudi (23 goals)

The 2016 IHF Super Globe was the tenth edition of the tournament. It was held in Doha (Qatar) at the Duhail Handball Sports Hall from 5 to 8 September 2016.

Berlin defeated Paris in the final to gain their second title.

== Teams ==
Eight teams participated.

Team	Qualified as
(Australia) Sydney University	Winner of 2016 Oceania Handball Champions Cup
(Brazil) HC Taubaté	Winner of 2016 Pan American Men's Club Handball Championship
(Poland) Vive Targi Kielce	Winner of 2015–16 EHF Champions League
(France) Paris Saint-Germain	Wild card
(Germany) Füchse Berlin	Winner of 2015 IHF Super Globe
(Qatar) Al Sadd	Host
(Qatar) Lekhwiya	Winner of 2015 Asian Champions League
(Tunisia) Espérance Sportive de Tunis	Winner of 2016 African Handball Super Cup

== Referees ==
The following pairs of referees were selected for the championship.

Referees
Argentina	Julian Lopez Grillo; Sebastián Lenci
Denmark	Martin Gjeding; Mads Hansen
Lithuania	Mindaugas Gatelis; Vaidas Mažeika
Slovenia	Bojan Lah; David Sok
Spain	Óscar Raluy López; Ángel Sabroso Ramírez

== Results ==
All times are local (UTC+3).

=== Bracket ===
Quarterfinals
5 September
(Qatar) Al Sadd	34
(Australia) Sydney University	18
5 September
(Germany) Füchse Berlin	27
(Qatar) Lekhwiya	25
5 September
(Poland) Vive Targi Kielce	33
(Brazil) HC Taubaté	30
5 September
(France) Paris Saint-Germain	38
(Tunisia) Espérance Sportive de Tunis	31

Semifinals
6 September
(Qatar) Al Sadd	26
(Germany) Füchse Berlin	32
6 September
(Poland) Vive Targi Kielce	25
(France) Paris Saint-Germain	29

Final
8 September
(Germany) Füchse Berlin	29
(France) Paris Saint-Germain	28
Third place
8 September
(Qatar) Al Sadd	25
(Poland) Vive Targi Kielce	36

5th place bracket

5–8th place semifinals
6 September
(Australia) Sydney University	17
(Qatar) Lekhwiya	29
6 September
(Brazil) HC Taubaté	20
(Tunisia) Espérance Sportive de Tunis	32

Fifth place
8 September
(Qatar) Lekhwiya	27
(Tunisia) Espérance Sportive de Tunis	28
Seventh place
8 September
(Australia) Sydney University	23
(Brazil) HC Taubaté	35

=== Quarterfinals ===
5 September 2016; 13:00	Vive Targi Kielce (Poland)	33–30	(Brazil) HC Taubaté	Duhail Handball Sports Hall, Doha; Attendance: 500; Referees: Gjeding, Hansen (DEN)
5 September 2016; 13:00	Ðukić 7	(21–15)	Teixeira 7	Duhail Handball Sports Hall, Doha; Attendance: 500; Referees: Gjeding, Hansen (DEN)
5 September 2016; 13:00	1× (yellow card) 3× (suspension)	Report	1× (yellow card) 5× (suspension)	Duhail Handball Sports Hall, Doha; Attendance: 500; Referees: Gjeding, Hansen (DEN)

5 September 2016; 15:00	Paris Saint-Germain (France)	38–31	(Tunisia) Espérance Sportive de Tunis	Duhail Handball Sports Hall, Doha; Attendance: 700; Referees: Lopéz, Ramírez (ESP)
5 September 2016; 15:00	Gensheimer 10	(21–18)	Mahmoudi 13	Duhail Handball Sports Hall, Doha; Attendance: 700; Referees: Lopéz, Ramírez (ESP)
5 September 2016; 15:00	4× (yellow card) 5× (suspension) 1×	Report	3× (yellow card) 9× (suspension) 1× (red card)	Duhail Handball Sports Hall, Doha; Attendance: 700; Referees: Lopéz, Ramírez (ESP)

5 September 2016; 17:00	Füchse Berlin (Germany)	27–25	(Qatar) Lekhwiya	Duhail Handball Sports Hall, Doha; Attendance: 1,500; Referees: Lah, Sok (SLO)
5 September 2016; 17:00	Nenadić 8	(14–12)	El-Ahmar 8	Duhail Handball Sports Hall, Doha; Attendance: 1,500; Referees: Lah, Sok (SLO)
5 September 2016; 17:00	3× (yellow card) 5× (suspension) 1× (red card)	Report	3× (yellow card) 2× (suspension)	Duhail Handball Sports Hall, Doha; Attendance: 1,500; Referees: Lah, Sok (SLO)

5 September 2016; 20:00	Al Sadd (Qatar)	34–18	(Australia) Sydney University	Duhail Handball Sports Hall, Doha; Attendance: 1,500; Referees: Grillo, Lenci (ARG)
5 September 2016; 20:00	Alkrad 6	(18–8)	Verlseeuwen 7	Duhail Handball Sports Hall, Doha; Attendance: 1,500; Referees: Grillo, Lenci (ARG)
5 September 2016; 20:00	2× (yellow card) 4× (suspension)	Report	1× (yellow card) 5× (suspension)	Duhail Handball Sports Hall, Doha; Attendance: 1,500; Referees: Grillo, Lenci (ARG)

=== 5–8th place semifinals ===
6 September 2016; 13:00	HC Taubaté (Brazil)	20–32	(Tunisia) Espérance Sportive de Tunis	Duhail Handball Sports Hall, Doha; Attendance: 600; Referees: Lah, Sok (SLO)
6 September 2016; 13:00	three players 3	(10–18)	Hammed 6	Duhail Handball Sports Hall, Doha; Attendance: 600; Referees: Lah, Sok (SLO)
6 September 2016; 13:00	3× (yellow card) 2× (suspension)	Report	2× (yellow card) 2× (suspension)	Duhail Handball Sports Hall, Doha; Attendance: 600; Referees: Lah, Sok (SLO)

6 September 2016; 15:00	Sydney University (Australia)	17–29	(Qatar) Lekhwiya	Duhail Handball Sports Hall, Doha; Attendance: 500; Referees: Grillo, Lenci (ARG)
6 September 2016; 15:00	Bonnin, Cumplido 4	(9–12)	Ramazan 5	Duhail Handball Sports Hall, Doha; Attendance: 500; Referees: Grillo, Lenci (ARG)
6 September 2016; 15:00	1× (yellow card) 3× (suspension)	Report	1× (yellow card) 3× (suspension)	Duhail Handball Sports Hall, Doha; Attendance: 500; Referees: Grillo, Lenci (ARG)

=== Semifinals ===
6 September 2016; 17:00	Vive Targi Kielce (Poland)	25–29	(France) Paris Saint-Germain	Duhail Handball Sports Hall, Doha; Attendance: 2,500; Referees: Gatelis, Mažeika (LTU)
6 September 2016; 17:00	Lijewski, Reichmann 5	(12–13)	Gensheimer, Narcisse 8	Duhail Handball Sports Hall, Doha; Attendance: 2,500; Referees: Gatelis, Mažeika (LTU)
6 September 2016; 17:00	2× (yellow card) 5× (suspension)	Report	2× (yellow card) 7× (suspension)	Duhail Handball Sports Hall, Doha; Attendance: 2,500; Referees: Gatelis, Mažeika (LTU)

6 September 2016; 19:00	Al Sadd (Qatar)	26–32	(Germany) Füchse Berlin	Duhail Handball Sports Hall, Doha; Attendance: 2,500; Referees: Lopéz, Ramírez (ESP)
6 September 2016; 19:00	Bannour 9	(12–15)	Lindberg 10	Duhail Handball Sports Hall, Doha; Attendance: 2,500; Referees: Lopéz, Ramírez (ESP)
6 September 2016; 19:00	3× (yellow card) 2× (suspension) 1× (red card)	Report	2× (yellow card) 4× (suspension)	Duhail Handball Sports Hall, Doha; Attendance: 2,500; Referees: Lopéz, Ramírez (ESP)

=== Seventh place game ===
8 September 2016; 13:00	Sydney University (Australia)	23–35	(Brazil) HC Taubaté	Duhail Handball Sports Hall, Doha; Referees: Gatelis, Mažeika (LTU)
8 September 2016; 13:00	Verlseeuwen 10	(11–20)	Lobato 12	Duhail Handball Sports Hall, Doha; Referees: Gatelis, Mažeika (LTU)
8 September 2016; 13:00	3× (yellow card) 8× (suspension)	Report	3× (yellow card) 5× (suspension)	Duhail Handball Sports Hall, Doha; Referees: Gatelis, Mažeika (LTU)

=== Fifth place game ===
8 September 2016; 15:00	Lekhwiya (Qatar)	27–28	(Tunisia) Espérance Sportive de Tunis	Duhail Handball Sports Hall, Doha; Attendance: 1,200; Referees: Grillo, Lenci (ARG)
8 September 2016; 15:00	Sinen 7	(16–15)	Boughanmi 6	Duhail Handball Sports Hall, Doha; Attendance: 1,200; Referees: Grillo, Lenci (ARG)
8 September 2016; 15:00	2× (yellow card) 4× (suspension)	Report	1× (yellow card) 6× (suspension)	Duhail Handball Sports Hall, Doha; Attendance: 1,200; Referees: Grillo, Lenci (ARG)

=== Third place game ===
8 September 2016; 17:00	Al Sadd (Qatar)	25–36	(Poland) Vive Targi Kielce	Duhail Handball Sports Hall, Doha; Referees: Lopéz, Ramírez (ESP)
8 September 2016; 17:00	Saïed 8	(12–20)	Ðukić 7	Duhail Handball Sports Hall, Doha; Referees: Lopéz, Ramírez (ESP)
8 September 2016; 17:00	2× (yellow card) 4× (suspension)	Report	2× (yellow card) 3× (suspension)	Duhail Handball Sports Hall, Doha; Referees: Lopéz, Ramírez (ESP)

=== Final ===
8 September 2016
19:00
Füchse Berlin (Germany)
29–28
(France) Paris Saint-Germain
Duhail Handball Sports Hall, Doha
Attendance: 3,000
Referees: Gjeding, Hansen (DEN)
Nenadić 5

Elísson 5

(12–15)
Hansen 7
1× (yellow card) 2× (suspension)
Report
2× (yellow card) 1× (suspension)

== Final ranking ==
1st place, gold medalist(s)	(Germany) Füchse Berlin
2nd place, silver medalist(s)	(France) Paris Saint-Germain
3rd place, bronze medalist(s)	(Poland) Vive Targi Kielce
4	(Qatar) Al Sadd
5	(Tunisia) Espérance Sportive de Tunis
6	(Qatar) Lekhwiya
7	(Brazil) HC Taubaté
8	(Australia) Sydney University
