= Liga Handebol Brasil 2019 =

2019 Liga Handebol Brasil
Tournament details
- Host country: Brazil

Final positions
- Champions: (São Paulo (state)) Handebol Taubaté (4th title)
- Runners-up: (São Paulo (state)) EC Pinheiros
- Third place: (São Paulo (state)) Corinthians Guarulhos
- Fourth place: (Piauí) GHC CAIC

The Liga Handebol Brasil 2019 (2019 Brazil Handball League) was the 23rd season of the top tier Brazilian handball national competitions for clubs, it is organized by the Brazilian Handball Confederation. For the 4th time Handebol Taubaté was crowned champion beating at the final EC Pinheiros.

== Teams qualified for the play-offs ==
South Southeast Conference

- (São Paulo (state)) Handebol Taubaté
- (São Paulo (state)) EC Pinheiros
- (São Paulo (state)) Corinthians Guarulhos

Northeastern Conference

- (Pernambuco) Clube Português
- (Piauí) GHC CAIC

== Play-offs ==
Quarter finals
(Pernambuco) Clube Português	24 - 24
(Piauí) GHC CAIC	26 - 27

Semi finals
(São Paulo (state)) EC Pinheiros	31
(Piauí) GHC CAIC	24
(São Paulo (state)) Handebol Taubaté	31
(São Paulo (state)) Corinthians Guarulhos	28

final
(São Paulo (state)) EC Pinheiros	19 - 20
(São Paulo (state)) Handebol Taubaté	23 - 20
3rd place
(Piauí) GHC CAIC	27 - 27
(São Paulo (state)) Corinthians Guarulhos	27 - 32

=== Final ===
December 15 2019	Handebol Taubaté (São Paulo (state))	20–20	(São Paulo (state)) EC Pinheiros	Ginásio Henrique Villaboim, São Paulo
December 15 2019		(11–12)		Ginásio Henrique Villaboim, São Paulo
