= Vinícius Teixeira =

Brazilian handball player (born 1988)

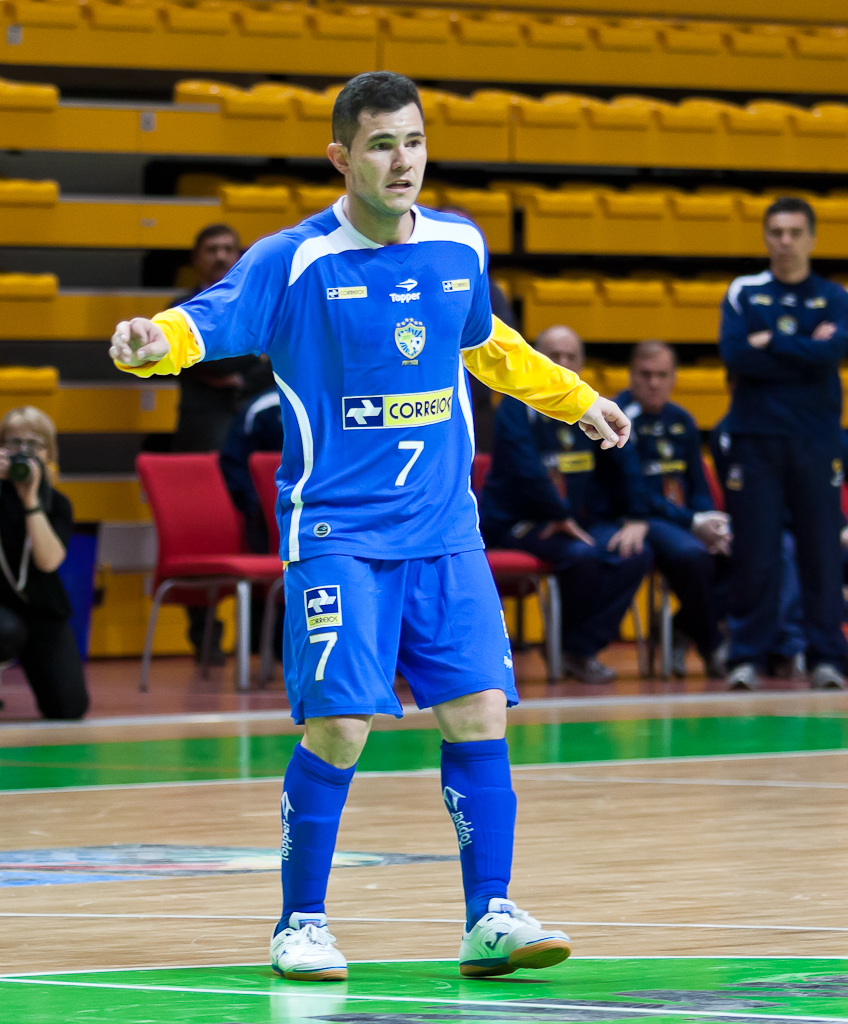

Personal information
- Born: 3 April 1988 (age 38) Linhares, Brazil
- Height: 1.89 m (6 ft 2 in)

Sport
- Sport: Handball
- Position: Pivot
- Current club: Handebol Taubaté
- Number: 25
National team
Years	Team	Apps	(Gls)
–	Brazil	143	(550)
Medal record
Pan American Games
Gold medal – first place	2015 Toronto	Team
Silver medal – second place	2011 Guadalajara	Team
Pan American Championship
Gold medal – first place	2016 Argentina
South and Central American Championship
Gold medal – first place	2024 Argentina

Vinícius Santos Teixeira (born 3 April 1988) is a Brazilian handball player for Handebol Taubaté and the Brazilian national team.

== Achievements ==
- Pan American Men's Club Handball Championship:
  - 2015, 2016, 2018
- South and Central American Men's Club Handball Championship:
  - 2019, 2022, 2024

== Individual Awards and achievements ==
=== Best Pivot ===
- 2016 Pan American Men's Club Handball Championship
- 2017 Pan American Men's Club Handball Championship
- 2022 South and Central American Men's Club Handball Championship
