= Diogo Hubner =

Brazilian handball player (born 1983)

Personal information
- Full name: Diogo Kent Hubner
- Nationality: Brazilian
- Born: 30 January 1983 (age 43)
- Height: 1.83 m (6 ft 0 in)

Sport
- Sport: Handball
- Position: Centre back
- Current club: EC Pinheiros
National team
Years	Team	Apps	(Gls)
–	Brazil	94	(135)
Medal record
Pan American Games
Gold medal – first place	2015 Toronto	Team
Pan American Championship
Gold medal – first place	2016 Argentina

Diogo Kent Hubner (born 30 January 1983) is a Brazilian handball player for São Caetano and the Brazilian national team.

== Titles ==
- Pan American Men's Club Handball Championship:
  - 2014, 2017
- South and Central American Men's Club Handball Championship:
  - 2021
