= Henrique Teixeira =

Brazilian handball player (born 1989)

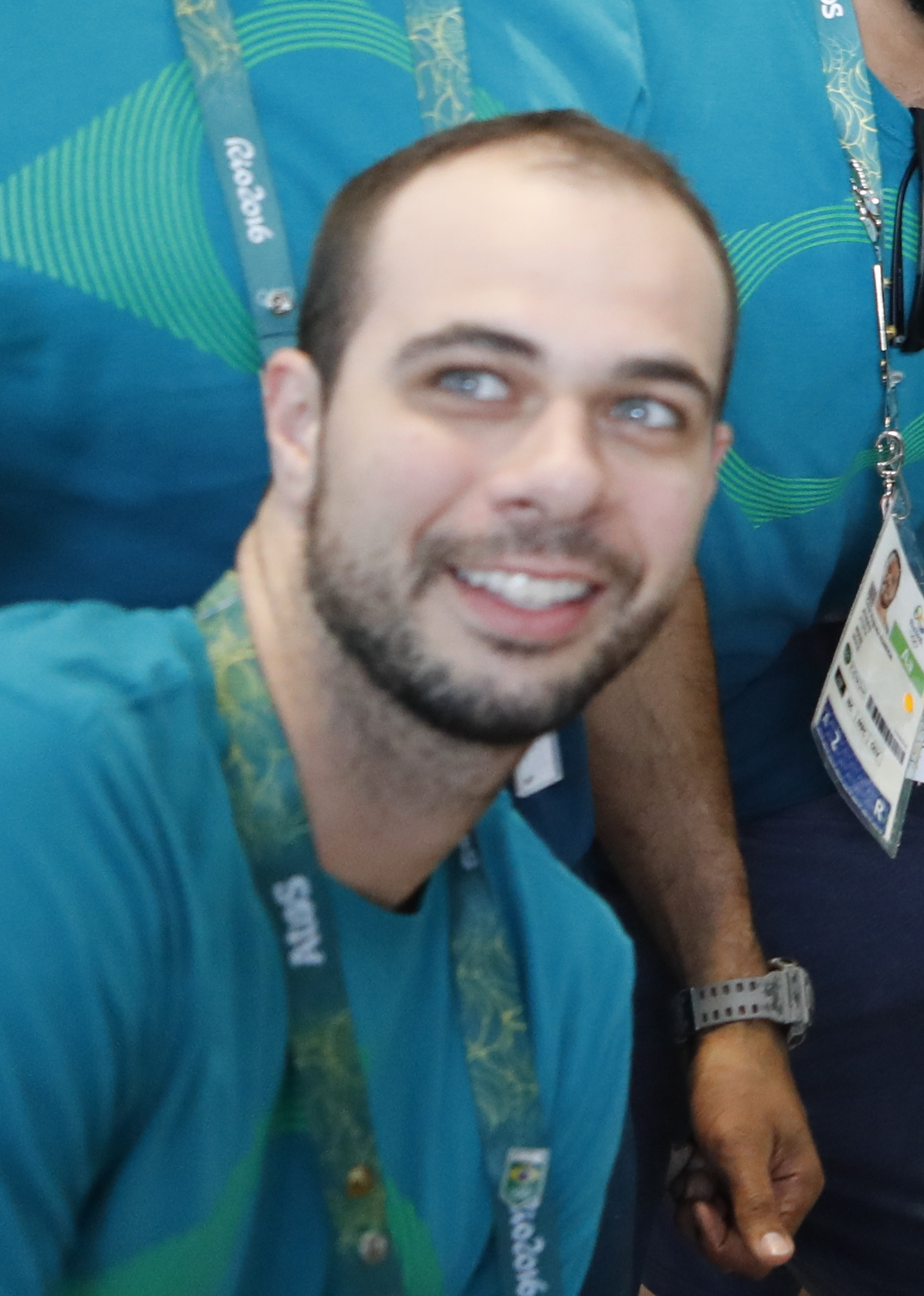
- Teixeira in 2016

Personal information
- Full name: Henrique Selicani Teixeira
- Born: 27 February 1989 (age 37) Maringá, Brazil
- Height: 1.92 m (6 ft 4 in)

Sport
- Sport: Handball
- Position: Centre back
- Current club: CSM București
- Number: 2

Senior clubs
- Years: Team
- –2015: Handebol Clube Taubaté
- 2015–2016: BM Granollers
- 2016–2018: BM Huesca
- 2018–: CSM București
National team
Years	Team	Apps	(Gls)
–	Brazil	120	(178)
Medal record
Pan American Games
Gold medal – first place	2015 Toronto	Team
Silver medal – second place	2011 Guadalajara	Team
Bronze medal – third place	2019 Lima	Team
Pan American Championship
Gold medal – first place	2016 Argentina
Silver medal – second place	2018 Greenland
South and Central American Championship
Silver medal – second place	2020 Brazil
South American Games
Gold medal – first place	2018 Cochabamba	Team

Henrique Selicani Teixeira (born 27 February 1989) is a Brazilian handball player for CSM București and the Brazil national team.

He won a gold medal the 2015 Pan American Games and competed at the 2015 World Championships and 2016 Summer Olympics.

== Titles ==
- Pan American Men's Club Handball Championship:
  - 2014, 2015

== Achievements ==
- 2018 Pan American Men's Handball Championship: Best player
