= Liga Nacional de Handebol 2015 =

Liga Nacional de Handebol
- Season: 2015
- Champions: EC Pinheiros
- Top goalscorer: (Brazil) Wesley Freitas (81)

The Liga Nacional de Handebol 2015 (2015 National Handball League) is the 19th season of the top tier Brazilian handball national competition for clubs. It is organized by the Brazilian Handball Confederation.

== Qualification Round ==
=== Group A ===
Team	Pld	W	D	L	GF	GA	GD	Pts
(São Paulo (state)) EC Pinheiros	8	7	1	0	249	201	+48	15
(Paraná (state)) Maringá Unifarma	8	5	0	3	195	193	+2	10
(Santa Catarina (state)) Itajaí	8	4	1	3	204	206	-2	9
(Minas Gerais) Independencia MRS	8	3	0	5	235	250	-15	6
(Paraná (state)) Unopar Londrina	8	0	0	8	222	246	-24	0

=== Group B ===
Team	Pld	W	D	L	GF	GA	GD	Pts
(São Paulo (state)) Handebol Taubaté	8	8	0	0	270	154	+116	16
(São Paulo (state)) São José	8	4	2	2	218	185	+33	10
(Rio de Janeiro (state)) Vasco FAB	8	3	2	3	232	216	+16	8
(São Paulo (state)) São Caetano	8	3	0	5	224	228	-4	6
(Minas Gerais) FUNEL Uberaba	8	0	0	8	148	307	-159	0

Teams qualified to the Semi-Final

== Semifinal ==
Dates		Home team in the 1st match	Home team in the 2nd match	Results		
1st match	2nd match	Home team in the 1st match	Home team in the 2nd match	Aggregate	1st match	2nd match
05/12	09/12	Itajaí	Handebol Taubaté	44-74	24-36	38-20
06/12	09/12	Maringá Unifarma	EC Pinheiros	39-56	20-30	26-19

== Final ==
December 12; 12:00	Handebol Taubaté	20 - 28	EC Pinheiros	Ginasio CEMTE, Taubaté
December 12; 12:00		(9-11)		Ginasio CEMTE, Taubaté
December 12; 12:00		Report		Ginasio CEMTE, Taubaté
