= Liga Nacional de Handebol 2017 =

2017 Liga Nacional de Handebol
Tournament details
- Host country: Brazil

Final positions
- Champions: (São Paulo (state)) EC Pinheiros (7th title)
- Runner-up: (São Paulo (state)) Handebol Taubaté
- Third place: (São Paulo (state)) Handebol São Caetano
- Fourth place: (Paraná (state)) Handebol Londrina

The Liga Nacional de Handebol 2017 (2017 National Handball League) was the 21st season of the top tier Brazilian handball national competitions for clubs, it is organized by the Brazilian Handball Confederation. For the 7th time EC Pinheiros was crowned champion winning in a two extra time final against Handebol Taubaté.

== Teams qualified for the second stage ==
South Southeast Conference

- (São Paulo (state)) Handebol Taubaté
- (São Paulo (state)) EC Pinheiros
- (São Paulo (state)) Handebol São Caetano
- (Paraná (state)) Handebol Londrina

Northeastern Conference

- (Pernambuco) Clube Portugues

Northern Conference

- (Pará) Carajás Handebol

Central west Conference

- (Federal District (Brazil)) Mega Alpha Handebol
- (Goiás) Handebol Rio Verde

== Second stage ==
=== Group A ===
Team	Pld	W	D	L	GF	GA	GD	Pts
(São Paulo (state)) Handebol Taubaté	3	3	0	0	102	51	51	6
(São Paulo (state)) Handebol São Caetano	3	2	0	1	97	79	18	4
(Pernambuco) Clube Portugues	3	1	0	2	82	98	–16	2
(Federal District (Brazil)) Mega Alpha Handebol	3	0	0	3	64	117	–53	0

=== Group B ===
Team	Pld	W	D	L	GF	GA	GD	Pts
(São Paulo (state)) EC Pinheiros	3	3	0	0	113	58	55	6
(Paraná (state)) Handebol Londrina	3	2	0	1	82	82	0	4
(Pará) Carajás Handebol	3	1	0	2	71	95	–24	2
(Goiás) Handebol Rio Verde	3	0	0	3	68	99	–31	0

Teams qualified to the Final Four

== Final Four ==
Semifinals
(São Paulo (state)) Handebol Taubaté	24	27	51
(Paraná (state)) Handebol Londrina	20	19	39
(São Paulo (state)) EC Pinheiros	35	26	61
(São Paulo (state)) Handebol São Caetano	26	25	51

Finals
(São Paulo (state)) Handebol Taubaté	26
(São Paulo (state)) EC Pinheiros (OT)	29
Third place
(Paraná (state)) Handebol Londrina	18
(São Paulo (state)) Handebol São Caetano	20

=== Final ===
December 17, 2017
09:30
Handebol Taubaté (São Paulo (state))
26–29 (ET)
(São Paulo (state)) EC Pinheiros
Ginásio Vitório Zanon, São Bernardo do Campo
Barros 7
(9–7)
Flosi 8

Report

FT: 19–19 ET: 4–4, 6–3
