= 2016 Pan American Men's Club Handball Championship =

Tournament details
- Host country: Argentina
- Venue(s): 1 (in 1 host city)
- Dates: 25–29 May
- Teams: 8 (from 1 confederation)

Final positions
- Champions: (Brazil) Handebol Taubaté (4th title)
- Runners-up: (Brazil) EC Pinheiros
- Third place: (Argentina) SAG Villa Ballester
- Fourth place: (Argentina) River Plate

Tournament statistics
- Matches played: 20
- Goals scored: 1,060 (53 per match)
- Attendance: 7,606 (380 per match)
- Top scorer(s): (Brazil) Leonardo Dutra (45 goals)

Awards
- Best player: (Brazil) Leonardo Dutra

The 2016 Pan American Men's Club Handball Championship was held in Villa Ballester, Buenos Aires 25–29 May. It acts as the Pan American qualifying tournament for the 2016 IHF Super Globe.

== Participating teams ==
- (Argentina) River Plate
- (Argentina) SAG Villa Ballester
- (Brazil) Handebol Taubaté
- (Brazil) EC Pinheiros
- (Chile) Club Italiano BM
- (Paraguay) Salto del Guairá
- (Uruguay) Colegio Alemán
- (United States) New York City Club

== Preliminary round ==
=== Group A ===
Team	Pld	W	D	L	GF	GA	GD	Pts
(Brazil) Handebol Taubaté	3	3	0	0	111	58	53	6
(Argentina) River Plate	3	2	0	1	83	71	12	4
(Chile) Club Italiano BM	3	1	0	2	54	91	–37	2
(United States) New York City Club	3	0	0	3	69	97	–28	0

Teams qualified to the semi-finals

May 25; 13:00	River Plate (Argentina)	32–22	(United States) New York City Club	Estadio Mundialista SAG, Villa Ballester; Attendance: 500; Referees: Prieto, Gonzalez
May 25; 13:00	Grandi 9	(15–10)	Briffe 7	Estadio Mundialista SAG, Villa Ballester; Attendance: 500; Referees: Prieto, Gonzalez
May 25; 13:00	3× (yellow card) 3× (suspension)	Report	3× (yellow card) 5× (suspension)	Estadio Mundialista SAG, Villa Ballester; Attendance: 500; Referees: Prieto, Gonzalez

May 25; 15:00	Handebol Taubaté (Brazil)	40–11	(Chile) Club Italiano BM	Estadio Mundialista SAG, Villa Ballester; Attendance: 500; Referees: Reyes, Zuniga
May 25; 15:00	Soares 7	(19–6)	Diaz 4	Estadio Mundialista SAG, Villa Ballester; Attendance: 500; Referees: Reyes, Zuniga
May 25; 15:00	3× (yellow card) 2× (suspension)	Report	2× (yellow card) 4× (suspension)	Estadio Mundialista SAG, Villa Ballester; Attendance: 500; Referees: Reyes, Zuniga

May 26; 13:00	New York City Club (United States)	22–38	(Brazil) Handebol Taubaté	Estadio Mundialista SAG, Villa Ballester; Referees: Marina, Acuña
May 26; 13:00	Briffe 10	(11–20)	Soares 7	Estadio Mundialista SAG, Villa Ballester; Referees: Marina, Acuña
May 26; 13:00	2× (yellow card) 4× (suspension)	Report	2× (yellow card)	Estadio Mundialista SAG, Villa Ballester; Referees: Marina, Acuña

May 26; 15:00	Club Italiano BM (Chile)	16–26	(Argentina) River Plate	Estadio Mundialista SAG, Villa Ballester; Attendance: 115; Referees: Roca, Magalhaes
May 26; 15:00	Diaz 5	(6–13)	Romero 5	Estadio Mundialista SAG, Villa Ballester; Attendance: 115; Referees: Roca, Magalhaes
May 26; 15:00	2× (yellow card) 5× (suspension)	Report	3× (yellow card) 3× (suspension)	Estadio Mundialista SAG, Villa Ballester; Attendance: 115; Referees: Roca, Magalhaes

May 27; 13:00	Club Italiano BM (Chile)	27–25	(United States) New York City Club	Estadio Mundialista SAG, Villa Ballester; Attendance: 141; Referees: Grillo, Lenci
May 27; 13:00	Bergamin 7	(14–13)	three players 4	Estadio Mundialista SAG, Villa Ballester; Attendance: 141; Referees: Grillo, Lenci
May 27; 13:00	3× (yellow card) 4× (suspension)	Report	2× (yellow card) 5× (suspension) 2× (red card)	Estadio Mundialista SAG, Villa Ballester; Attendance: 141; Referees: Grillo, Lenci

May 27; 17:00	Handebol Taubaté (Brazil)	33–25	(Argentina) River Plate	Estadio Mundialista SAG, Villa Ballester; Attendance: 500; Referees: Gonzalez, Prieto
May 27; 17:00	Brafante 6	(15–9)	Vázquez 8	Estadio Mundialista SAG, Villa Ballester; Attendance: 500; Referees: Gonzalez, Prieto
May 27; 17:00	3× (yellow card) 4× (suspension)	Report	3× (yellow card) 2× (suspension)	Estadio Mundialista SAG, Villa Ballester; Attendance: 500; Referees: Gonzalez, Prieto

=== Group B ===
Team	Pld	W	D	L	GF	GA	GD	Pts
(Brazil) EC Pinheiros	3	3	0	0	98	69	29	6
(Argentina) SAG Villa Ballester	3	2	0	1	106	66	40	4
(Uruguay) Colegio Alemán	3	1	0	2	68	83	–15	2
(Paraguay) Salto del Guairá	3	0	0	3	57	111	–54	0

Teams qualified to the semi-finals

May 25; 17:00	EC Pinheiros (Brazil)	43–19	(Paraguay) Salto del Guairá	Estadio Mundialista SAG, Villa Ballester; Attendance: 750; Referees: Marina, Acuña
May 25; 17:00	Medeiros 8	(18–14)	Perez 6	Estadio Mundialista SAG, Villa Ballester; Attendance: 750; Referees: Marina, Acuña
May 25; 17:00	3× (yellow card) 4× (suspension)	Report	2× (yellow card) 3× (suspension)	Estadio Mundialista SAG, Villa Ballester; Attendance: 750; Referees: Marina, Acuña

May 25; 19:00	SAG Villa Ballester (Argentina)	35–21	(Uruguay) Colegio Alemán	Estadio Mundialista SAG, Villa Ballester; Attendance: 784; Referees: Magalhaes, Rocha
May 25; 19:00	three players 5	(15–12)	Morandeira, Velazco 5	Estadio Mundialista SAG, Villa Ballester; Attendance: 784; Referees: Magalhaes, Rocha
May 25; 19:00	3× (yellow card) 5× (suspension)	Report	2× (yellow card) 4× (suspension)	Estadio Mundialista SAG, Villa Ballester; Attendance: 784; Referees: Magalhaes, Rocha

May 26; 17:00	Colegio Alemán (Uruguay)	24–27	(Brazil) EC Pinheiros	Estadio Mundialista SAG, Villa Ballester; Attendance: 400; Referees: Lenci, Grillo
May 26; 17:00	Velazco 9	(15–13)	Dutra 10	Estadio Mundialista SAG, Villa Ballester; Attendance: 400; Referees: Lenci, Grillo
May 26; 17:00	3× (yellow card) 3× (suspension)	Report	2× (yellow card) 6× (suspension)	Estadio Mundialista SAG, Villa Ballester; Attendance: 400; Referees: Lenci, Grillo

May 26; 19:00	Salto del Guairá (Paraguay)	17–45	(Argentina) SAG Villa Ballester	Estadio Mundialista SAG, Villa Ballester; Attendance: 400; Referees: Reyes, Zuniga
May 26; 19:00	Perez, Benitez 4	(9–17)	Werner 9	Estadio Mundialista SAG, Villa Ballester; Attendance: 400; Referees: Reyes, Zuniga
May 26; 19:00	2× (yellow card) 7× (suspension) 1× (red card)	Report	3× (yellow card) 4× (suspension)	Estadio Mundialista SAG, Villa Ballester; Attendance: 400; Referees: Reyes, Zuniga

May 27; 15:00	Salto del Guairá (Paraguay)	21–23	(Uruguay) Colegio Alemán	Estadio Mundialista SAG, Villa Ballester; Attendance: 180; Referees: Rocha, Magalhaes
May 27; 15:00	Garcete 6	(12–11)	Morandeira 9	Estadio Mundialista SAG, Villa Ballester; Attendance: 180; Referees: Rocha, Magalhaes
May 27; 15:00	2× (yellow card) 6× (suspension)	Report	3× (yellow card) 4× (suspension)	Estadio Mundialista SAG, Villa Ballester; Attendance: 180; Referees: Rocha, Magalhaes

May 27; 19:00	EC Pinheiros (Brazil)	28–26	(Argentina) SAG Villa Ballester	Estadio Mundialista SAG, Villa Ballester; Attendance: 781; Referees: Marina, Acuña
May 27; 19:00	Dutra 13	(13–15)	Souto 8	Estadio Mundialista SAG, Villa Ballester; Attendance: 781; Referees: Marina, Acuña
May 27; 19:00	3× (yellow card) 5× (suspension)	Report	2× (yellow card) 4× (suspension)	Estadio Mundialista SAG, Villa Ballester; Attendance: 781; Referees: Marina, Acuña

== Knockout stage ==
=== Bracket ===
Semifinals
28 May
(Brazil) Handebol Taubaté	28
(Argentina) SAG Villa Ballester	19
28 May
(Argentina) River Plate	26
(Brazil) EC Pinheiros	30

Final
29 May
(Brazil) Handebol Taubaté	28
(Brazil) EC Pinheiros	23
Third place
29 May
(Argentina) SAG Villa Ballester	33
(Argentina) River Plate	27

5–8th place bracket

5–8th place semifinals
28 May
(Chile) Club Italiano BM	29
(Paraguay) Salto del Guairá	22
28 May
(United States) New York City Club	24
(Uruguay) Colegio Alemán	22

Fifth place
29 May
(Chile) Club Italiano BM	22
(United States) New York City Club	26
Seventh place
29 May
(Paraguay) Salto del Guairá	23
(Uruguay) Colegio Alemán	32

=== 5–8th place semifinals ===
May 28; 13:30	Club Italiano BM (Chile)	29–22	(Paraguay) Salto del Guairá	Estadio Mundialista SAG, Villa Ballester; Attendance: 110; Referees: Prieto, Gonzalez
May 28; 13:30	Valenzuela 6	(17–9)	Benitez 4	Estadio Mundialista SAG, Villa Ballester; Attendance: 110; Referees: Prieto, Gonzalez
May 28; 13:30	2× (yellow card) 4× (suspension)	Report	2× (yellow card) 8× (suspension)	Estadio Mundialista SAG, Villa Ballester; Attendance: 110; Referees: Prieto, Gonzalez

May 28; 15:30	New York City Club (United States)	24–22	(Uruguay) Colegio Alemán	Estadio Mundialista SAG, Villa Ballester; Attendance: 200; Referees: Reyes, Zuniga
May 28; 15:30	Briffe 6	(13–14)	Vecino 9	Estadio Mundialista SAG, Villa Ballester; Attendance: 200; Referees: Reyes, Zuniga
May 28; 15:30	2× (yellow card) 1× (suspension)	Report	2× (yellow card) 1× (suspension)	Estadio Mundialista SAG, Villa Ballester; Attendance: 200; Referees: Reyes, Zuniga

=== Semifinals ===
May 28; 18:00	Handebol Taubaté (Brazil)	28–19	(Argentina) SAG Villa Ballester	Estadio Mundialista SAG, Villa Ballester; Attendance: 795; Referees: Lenci, Grillo
May 28; 18:00	Teixeira 6	(18–9)	Souto 7	Estadio Mundialista SAG, Villa Ballester; Attendance: 795; Referees: Lenci, Grillo
May 28; 18:00	2× (yellow card) 3× (suspension)	Report	3× (yellow card) 3× (suspension)	Estadio Mundialista SAG, Villa Ballester; Attendance: 795; Referees: Lenci, Grillo

May 28; 20:00	River Plate (Argentina)	26–30	(Brazil) EC Pinheiros	Estadio Mundialista SAG, Villa Ballester; Attendance: 400; Referees: Magalhaes, Rocha
May 28; 20:00	Vázquez 9	(10–16)	Dutra 12	Estadio Mundialista SAG, Villa Ballester; Attendance: 400; Referees: Magalhaes, Rocha
May 28; 20:00	3× (yellow card) 2× (suspension)	Report	3× (yellow card) 2× (suspension)	Estadio Mundialista SAG, Villa Ballester; Attendance: 400; Referees: Magalhaes, Rocha

=== Seventh place game ===
May 29; 10:30	Salto del Guairá (Paraguay)	23–32	(Uruguay) Colegio Alemán	Estadio Mundialista SAG, Villa Ballester; Referees: Reyes, Zuniga
May 29; 10:30	four players 4	(8–16)	Aicardi 9	Estadio Mundialista SAG, Villa Ballester; Referees: Reyes, Zuniga
May 29; 10:30	4× (yellow card) 1× (suspension)	Report	3× (yellow card) 1× (suspension)	Estadio Mundialista SAG, Villa Ballester; Referees: Reyes, Zuniga

=== Fifth place game ===
May 29; 12:30	Club Italiano BM (Chile)	22–26	(United States) New York City Club	Estadio Mundialista SAG, Villa Ballester; Attendance: 250; Referees: Prieto, Gonzalez
May 29; 12:30	Diaz 6	(15–13)	Radovanovic 8	Estadio Mundialista SAG, Villa Ballester; Attendance: 250; Referees: Prieto, Gonzalez
May 29; 12:30	1× (yellow card) 4× (suspension)	Report	2× (yellow card) 4× (suspension)	Estadio Mundialista SAG, Villa Ballester; Attendance: 250; Referees: Prieto, Gonzalez

=== Third place game ===
May 29; 14:30	SAG Villa Ballester (Argentina)	33–27	(Argentina) River Plate	Estadio Mundialista SAG, Villa Ballester; Attendance: 450; Referees: Marina, Acuña
May 29; 14:30	M. Canepa, S. Cánepa 8	(13–12)	Lima 6	Estadio Mundialista SAG, Villa Ballester; Attendance: 450; Referees: Marina, Acuña
May 29; 14:30	3× (yellow card) 2× (suspension)	Report	4× (yellow card) 4× (suspension)	Estadio Mundialista SAG, Villa Ballester; Attendance: 450; Referees: Marina, Acuña

=== Final ===
May 29; 17:00	Handebol Taubaté (Brazil)	28–23	(Brazil) EC Pinheiros	Estadio Mundialista SAG, Villa Ballester; Attendance: 350; Referees: Lenci, Grillo
May 29; 17:00	Oliveira 8	(14–8)	Santaela 6	Estadio Mundialista SAG, Villa Ballester; Attendance: 350; Referees: Lenci, Grillo
May 29; 17:00	1× (yellow card) 3× (suspension)	Report	1× (yellow card) 1× (suspension)	Estadio Mundialista SAG, Villa Ballester; Attendance: 350; Referees: Lenci, Grillo

== Final standing ==
Rank	Team
Gold medal	(Brazil) Handebol Taubaté
Silver medal	(Brazil) EC Pinheiros
Bronze medal	(Argentina) SAG Villa Ballester
4	(Argentina) River Plate
5	(United States) New York City Club
6	(Chile) Club Italiano BM
7	(Uruguay) Colegio Alemán
8	(Paraguay) Salto del Guairá

Team qualified to the 2016 IHF Super Globe

== Awards ==
All-star team

- Goalkeeper: (Brazil) Maik Santos
- Right Wing: (Brazil) Lucas Cândido
- Right Back: (United States) Benjamin Briffe
- Playmaker: (Argentina) Julián Souto Cueto
- Left Back: (Brazil) Leonardo Dutra
- Left Wing: (Argentina) Adrian Portela
- Pivot: (Brazil) Vinícius Teixeira
