= Liga Nacional de Handebol 2018 =

2018 Liga Nacional de Handebol
Tournament details
- Host country: Brazil

Final positions
- Champions: (São Paulo (state)) EC Pinheiros (8th title)
- Runners-up: (São Paulo (state)) Handebol Taubaté
- Third place: (Paraná (state)) Handebol Londrina
- Fourth place: (São Paulo (state)) Handebol São Caetano

The Liga Nacional de Handebol 2018 (2018 National Handball League) was the 22nd season of the top tier Brazilian handball national competitions for clubs, it is organized by the Brazilian Handball Confederation. For the 8th time EC Pinheiros was crowned champion winning the final against Handebol Taubaté.

== Teams qualified for the play-offs ==
South Southeast Conference

- (São Paulo (state)) Handebol Taubaté
- (São Paulo (state)) EC Pinheiros
- (São Paulo (state)) Handebol São Caetano
- (Paraná (state)) Handebol Londrina

Northeastern Conference

- (Piauí) GHC CAIC
- (Pernambuco) Clube Português

Northern Conference

- (Rondônia) Rádio Farol

Central west Conference

- (Mato Grosso) AASHb

== Play-offs ==
Quarter-finals
(São Paulo (state))	Handebol Taubaté
(Rondônia)	~~Rádio Farol~~ withdrawn
(Paraná (state))	Handebol Londrina	38	41	79
(Mato Grosso)	AASHb	23	30	53
(São Paulo (state))	Handebol São Caetano	24	29	53
(Piauí)	GHC CAIC	28	23	51
(São Paulo (state))	EC Pinheiros	35	32	67
(Pernambuco)	Clube Português	24	24	48

Semi-finals
(São Paulo (state))	Handebol Taubaté	37	29	66
(Paraná (state))	Handebol Londrina	27	21	48
(São Paulo (state))	Handebol São Caetano	18	16	34
(São Paulo (state))	EC Pinheiros	30	36	66

Final
(São Paulo (state))	Handebol Taubaté	20
(São Paulo (state))	EC Pinheiros	21
Third place
(Paraná (state))	Handebol Londrina	28
(São Paulo (state))	Handebol São Caetano	23

=== Final ===
November 11 2018; 13:00	Handebol Taubaté (São Paulo (state))	20–21	(São Paulo (state)) EC Pinheiros	Ginásio Henrique Villaboim, São Paulo
November 11 2018; 13:00		(9–12)		Ginásio Henrique Villaboim, São Paulo
