= Brazilian Handball Confederation =

Governing body of handball in Brazil

Brazilian Handball Confederation (Portuguese: Confederação Brasileira de Handebol) CBHb
- IOC nation: BRA
- Sport: Handball
- Other sports: Beach Handball; Wheelchair Handball
- Official website: cbhb.org.br

HISTORY
- Preceding organisations: Brazilian Confederation of Sports (CBD)
- Year of formation: 1 June 1979; 47 years ago at Rio de Janeiro (Brazil)

DEMOGRAPHICS
- Membership size: 26

AFFILIATIONS
- International federation: International Handball Federation (IHF)
- IHF member since: 1954
- Continental association: Pan-American Team Handball Federation (PATHF)
- National Olympic Committee: Brazilian Olympic Committee (BOC)
- Member of NOC since: 1979

GOVERNING BODY
- President: Prof. Dr. Manoel Luiz Oliveira (Brazil)

HEADQUARTERS
- Address: Rua Monsehor Silveira 171 Sao José, Aracaju
- Country: Brazil
- Secretary General: Mr. Icaro Angelo

The Brazilian Handball Confederation (Portuguese: Confederação Brasileira de Handebol) is the governing body of handball in Brazil, established in 1979. The president is Manoel Luiz Oliveira. It organises the Liga Nacional de Handebol; it also runs the Brazil national teams for men and women and organises the Four Nations Tournament friendly competition.

== Champions of the Liga Nacional ==
Champions of the Liga Nacional
Year	Men's Tournament	Women's Tournament
1997	(São Paulo (state)) Metodista São Bernardo	(São Paulo (state)) AA Guarú
1998	(São Paulo (state)) Metodista São Bernardo	(Rio Grande do Sul) Clube Atlético Cairu
1999	(São Paulo (state)) Metodista São Bernardo	(Rio de Janeiro (state)) CE Mauá
2000	(São Paulo (state)) Metodista São Bernardo	(São Paulo (state)) AA Guarú
2001	(São Paulo (state)) Metodista São Bernardo	(São Paulo (state)) AA Guarú
2002	(São Paulo (state)) Metodista São Bernardo	(São Paulo (state)) AA Guarú
2003	(São Paulo (state)) Imes São Caetano	(Rio de Janeiro (state)) CE Mauá
2004	(São Paulo (state)) Metodista São Bernardo	(Rio de Janeiro (state)) CE Mauá
2005	(Paraná (state)) Unifil Londrina	(São Paulo (state)) AA Guarú
2006	(São Paulo (state)) Metodista São Bernardo	(São Paulo (state)) Metodista São Bernardo
2007	(São Paulo (state)) EC Pinheiros	(São Paulo (state)) Metodista São Bernardo
2008	(Paraná (state)) Unopar Paraná	(São Paulo (state)) Metodista São Bernardo
2009	(São Paulo (state)) EC Pinheiros	(São Paulo (state)) Metodista São Bernardo
2010	(São Paulo (state)) EC Pinheiros	(São Paulo (state)) Metodista São Bernardo
2011	(São Paulo (state)) EC Pinheiros	(São Paulo (state)) Metodista São Bernardo
2012	(São Paulo (state)) EC Pinheiros	(São Paulo (state)) Metodista São Bernardo
2013	(São Paulo (state)) Handebol Taubaté	(Santa Catarina (state)) UnC Concórdia
2014	(São Paulo (state)) Handebol Taubaté	(São Paulo (state)) Metodista São Bernardo
2015	(São Paulo (state)) EC Pinheiros	(São Paulo (state)) Metodista São Bernardo
2016	(São Paulo (state)) Handebol Taubaté	(São Paulo (state)) EC Pinheiros
2017	(São Paulo (state)) EC Pinheiros	(Santa Catarina (state)) UnC Concórdia
2018	(São Paulo (state)) EC Pinheiros	2018 (Santa Catarina (state)) UnC Concórdia
2019	(São Paulo (state)) Handebol Taubaté	2019 (São Paulo (state)) EC Pinheiros
2020	(São Paulo (state)) Handebol Taubaté	Cancelled
2021	(São Paulo (state)) Handebol Taubaté	(Pernambuco) Clube Português do Recife
2022	(São Paulo (state)) Handebol Taubaté	(São Paulo (state)) EC Pinheiros
2023	(Minas Gerais) Praia Clube	(São Paulo (state)) EC Pinheiros
2024	(São Paulo (state)) EC Pinheiros	(São Paulo (state)) EC Pinheiros
