= Juan Rubio =

Spanish water polo player (born 1951)

Personal information
- Nationality: Spanish
- Born: 31 July 1951 (age 73); Barcelona, Spain

Sport
- Sport: Water polo

Juan Rubio (born 31 July 1951) is a Spanish water polo player. He competed at the 1968 Summer Olympics and the 1972 Summer Olympics.
