= 2018 Pan American Men's Club Handball Championship =

Tournament details
- Host country: Brazil
- Venue(s): 1 (in 1 host city)
- Dates: 23–27 May
- Teams: 7 (from 2 confederations)

Final positions
- Champions: (Brazil) Handebol Taubaté (5th title)
- Runner-up: (Argentina) SAG Villa Ballester
- Third place: (Brazil) EC Pinheiros
- Fourth place: (Argentina) Ferro Carril Oeste

Tournament statistics
- Matches played: 15
- Goals scored: 800 (53.33 per match)

The 2018 Pan American Men's Club Handball Championship was the XI and last edition of this tournament, held in Taubaté, Brazil from 23 to 27 May 2018. It acted as a qualifying tournament for the 2018 IHF Super Globe.

== Participating teams ==
Locations of the 2018 Pan American Men's Club Handball Championship participians
- (Argentina) SAG Villa Ballester
- (Argentina) Ferro Carril Oeste
- (Brazil) Handebol Taubaté
- (Brazil) EC Pinheiros
- (Brazil) Handebol Londrina
- (Canada) Alberta Team Handball
- (Chile) Ovalle Balonmano

== Modus ==
The seven teams played in two groups a round Robin.

The last from Group A and the two last from Group B played a Consolation round.

The first from each group played against the second from the other group the Semifinals.

The losers of the semis played Third place game and the winners the Final.

== Preliminary round ==
=== Group A ===
Pos	Team	Pld	W	D	L	GF	GA	GD	Pts	Qualification
1	(Brazil) Handebol Taubaté (H)	2	2	0	0	66	31	+35	4	Semifinals
2	(Argentina) SAG Villa Ballester	2	1	0	1	50	47	+3	2	Semifinals
3	(Chile) Ovalle Balonmano	2	0	0	2	35	73	−38	0	Consolation round

Source: handballargentina.org
(H) Hosts

All times are local (UTC–3).

23 May; 20:00	Handebol Taubaté (Brazil)	40–14	(Chile) Ovalle Balonmano	Ginásio CEMTE, Taubaté
23 May; 20:00		(21–9)		Ginásio CEMTE, Taubaté

24 May; 18:00	Ovalle Balonmano (Chile)	21–33	(Argentina) SAG Villa Ballester	Ginásio CEMTE, Taubaté; Attendance: 200; Referees: Galenao, Franco (PAR)
24 May; 18:00	Rubio 7	(12–16)	Cánepa, Kogovsek 8	Ginásio CEMTE, Taubaté; Attendance: 200; Referees: Galenao, Franco (PAR)
24 May; 18:00	2× (yellow card) 2× (suspension)	Report	3× (yellow card) 5× (suspension)	Ginásio CEMTE, Taubaté; Attendance: 200; Referees: Galenao, Franco (PAR)

25 May; 20:00	Handebol Taubaté (Brazil)	26–17	(Argentina) SAG Villa Ballester	Ginásio CEMTE, Taubaté; Attendance: 250; Referees: Menezes, Pinto (BRA)
25 May; 20:00	four players 4	(13–11)	Aizen 7	Ginásio CEMTE, Taubaté; Attendance: 250; Referees: Menezes, Pinto (BRA)
25 May; 20:00	4× (yellow card) 3× (suspension) 1× (red card)	Report	2× (yellow card) 5× (suspension)	Ginásio CEMTE, Taubaté; Attendance: 250; Referees: Menezes, Pinto (BRA)

=== Group B ===
Pos	Team	Pld	W	D	L	GF	GA	GD	Pts	Qualification
1	(Brazil) EC Pinheiros	3	2	1	0	117	59	+58	5	Semifinals
2	(Argentina) Ferro Carril Oeste	3	2	1	0	82	71	+11	5	Semifinals
3	(Brazil) Handebol Londrina	3	1	0	2	79	90	−11	2	Consolation round
4	(Canada) Alberta Team Handball	3	0	0	3	52	110	−58	0	Consolation round

Source: handballargentina.org

23 May; 16:00	Ferro Carril Oeste (Argentina)	32–26	(Brazil) Handebol Londrina	Ginásio CEMTE, Taubaté; Attendance: 150; Referees: Pinto, Menezes (BRA)
23 May; 16:00	Taurian 7	(17–14)	Nunes, Vasques 5	Ginásio CEMTE, Taubaté; Attendance: 150; Referees: Pinto, Menezes (BRA)
23 May; 16:00	4× (yellow card) 2× (suspension)	Report	4× (yellow card) 4× (suspension)	Ginásio CEMTE, Taubaté; Attendance: 150; Referees: Pinto, Menezes (BRA)

23 May; 18:00	EC Pinheiros (Brazil)	56–10	(Canada) Alberta Team Handball	Ginásio CEMTE, Taubaté
23 May; 18:00		(27–1)		Ginásio CEMTE, Taubaté

24 May; 16:00	Alberta Team Handball (Canada)	20–25	(Argentina) Ferro Carril Oeste	Ginásio CEMTE, Taubaté; Attendance: 120; Referees: Rocha, Magalhães (BRA)
24 May; 16:00	Chauvet 4	(13–16)	América 5	Ginásio CEMTE, Taubaté; Attendance: 120; Referees: Rocha, Magalhães (BRA)
24 May; 16:00	1× (yellow card) 3× (suspension)	Report	2× (yellow card) 4× (suspension)	Ginásio CEMTE, Taubaté; Attendance: 120; Referees: Rocha, Magalhães (BRA)

24 May; 20:00	Handebol Londrina (Brazil)	24–36	(Brazil) EC Pinheiros	Ginásio CEMTE, Taubaté
24 May; 20:00		(8–22)		Ginásio CEMTE, Taubaté

25 May; 16:00	Alberta Team Handball (Canada)	22–29	(Brazil) Handebol Londrina	Ginásio CEMTE, Taubaté
25 May; 16:00		(12–12)		Ginásio CEMTE, Taubaté

25 May; 18:00	EC Pinheiros (Brazil)	25–25	(Argentina) Ferro Carril Oeste	Ginásio CEMTE, Taubaté; Attendance: 120; Referees: Rocha, Magalhães (BRA)
25 May; 18:00	Hackbarth 9	(15–14)	Taurian 6	Ginásio CEMTE, Taubaté; Attendance: 120; Referees: Rocha, Magalhães (BRA)
25 May; 18:00	2× (yellow card) 4× (suspension)	Report	4× (yellow card) 3× (suspension)	Ginásio CEMTE, Taubaté; Attendance: 120; Referees: Rocha, Magalhães (BRA)

== Consolation round ==
Pos	Team	Pld	W	D	L	GF	GA	GD	Pts
5	(Chile) Ovalle Balonmano	2	2	0	0	68	51	+17	4
6	(Brazil) Handebol Londrina	2	1	0	1	56	57	−1	2
7	(Canada) Alberta Team Handball	2	0	0	2	46	62	−16	0

Source: handballargentina.org

26 May; 14:00	Handebol Londrina (Brazil)	27–35	(Chile) Ovalle Balonmano	Ginásio CEMTE, Taubaté
26 May; 14:00		(12–15)		Ginásio CEMTE, Taubaté

27 May; 13:00	Ovalle Balonmano (Chile)	33–24	(Canada) Alberta Team Handball	Ginásio CEMTE, Taubaté
27 May; 13:00		(18–15)		Ginásio CEMTE, Taubaté

== Knockout stage ==
=== Bracket ===
Semifinals
26 May
(Brazil) Handebol Taubaté	32
(Argentina) Ferro Carril Oeste	19
26 May
(Brazil) EC Pinheiros	25
(Argentina) SAG Villa Ballester	26

Final
27 May
(Brazil) Handebol Taubaté	26
(Argentina) SAG Villa Ballester	18
Third place
27 May
(Brazil) EC Pinheiros	33
(Argentina) Ferro Carril Oeste	22

=== Semifinals ===
26 May; 16:00	Handebol Taubaté (Brazil)	32–19	(Argentina) Ferro Carril Oeste	Ginásio CEMTE, Taubaté; Attendance: 200; Referees: Menezes, Pinto (BRA)
26 May; 16:00	five players 4	(17–13)	Arce 4	Ginásio CEMTE, Taubaté; Attendance: 200; Referees: Menezes, Pinto (BRA)
26 May; 16:00	2× (yellow card) 2× (suspension)	Report	2× (yellow card) 4× (suspension)	Ginásio CEMTE, Taubaté; Attendance: 200; Referees: Menezes, Pinto (BRA)

26 May; 18:00	EC Pinheiros (Brazil)	25–26	(Argentina) SAG Villa Ballester	Ginásio CEMTE, Taubaté; Attendance: 200; Referees: Delgado, Acuña (ARG)
26 May; 18:00	Souto Cueto 6	(15–14)	Cánepa 9	Ginásio CEMTE, Taubaté; Attendance: 200; Referees: Delgado, Acuña (ARG)
26 May; 18:00	4× (yellow card) 3× (suspension) 1× (red card)	Report	2× (yellow card) 4× (suspension)	Ginásio CEMTE, Taubaté; Attendance: 200; Referees: Delgado, Acuña (ARG)

=== Third place game ===
27 May; 15:00	EC Pinheiros (Brazil)	33–22	(Argentina) Ferro Carril Oeste	Ginásio CEMTE, Taubaté; Attendance: 300; Referees: Menezes, Pinto (BRA)
27 May; 15:00	Hackbarth 7	(12–11)	Lopez 6	Ginásio CEMTE, Taubaté; Attendance: 300; Referees: Menezes, Pinto (BRA)
27 May; 15:00	4× (yellow card) 4× (suspension)	Report	2× (yellow card) 3× (suspension) 2× (red card)	Ginásio CEMTE, Taubaté; Attendance: 300; Referees: Menezes, Pinto (BRA)

=== Final ===
27 May; 17:00	Handebol Taubaté (Brazil)	26–18	(Argentina) SAG Villa Ballester	Ginásio CEMTE, Taubaté; Attendance: 500; Referees: Delgado, Acuña (ARG)
27 May; 17:00	Soares 5	(14–8)	Cánepa 4	Ginásio CEMTE, Taubaté; Attendance: 500; Referees: Delgado, Acuña (ARG)
27 May; 17:00	3× (yellow card) 4× (suspension)	Report	2× (yellow card) 3× (suspension) 1× (red card)	Ginásio CEMTE, Taubaté; Attendance: 500; Referees: Delgado, Acuña (ARG)

== Final standing ==
Rank	Team
Gold medal	(Brazil) Handebol Taubaté
Silver medal	(Argentina) SAG Villa Ballester
Bronze medal	(Brazil) EC Pinheiros
4	(Argentina) Ferro Carril Oeste
5	(Chile) Ovalle Balonmano
6	(Brazil) Handebol Londrina
7	(Canada) Alberta Team Handball

Team qualified to the 2018 IHF Super Globe
