= 2019 South and Central American Men's Club Handball Championship =

Tournament details
- Host country: Brazil
- Venue(s): 1 (in 1 host city)
- Dates: 22–26 May
- Teams: 8 (from 1 confederation)

Final positions
- Champions: (Brazil) Handebol Taubaté (1st title)
- Runner-up: (Argentina) UNLu
- Third place: (Brazil) EC Pinheiros
- Fourth place: (Argentina) SAG Villa Ballester

Tournament statistics
- Matches played: 20
- Goals scored: 1,057 (52.85 per match)
- Top scorer(s): (Chile) Javier Frelijj (30 goals)

The 2019 South and Central American Men's Club Handball Championship the 1st edition of this tournament was held in Taubaté, Brazil from 22 to 26 May 2019. It acted as a qualifying tournament for the 2019 IHF Super Globe.

== Participating teams ==
- (Argentina) SAG Villa Ballester
- (Argentina) UNLu
- (Brazil) Handebol Taubaté
- (Brazil) EC Pinheiros
- (Chile) Ovalle Balonmano
- (Chile) Luterano de Valparaíso
- (Uruguay) Colegio Alemán
- (Uruguay) Scuola Italiana

== Preliminary round ==
=== Group A ===
Pos	Team	Pld	W	D	L	GF	GA	GD	Pts	Qualification
1	(Brazil) Handebol Taubaté (H)	3	3	0	0	110	42	+68	6	Semifinals
2	(Argentina) UNLu	3	2	0	1	80	72	+8	4	Semifinals
3	(Chile) Ovalle Balonmano	3	1	0	2	60	90	−30	2	5–8th place semifinals
4	(Uruguay) Colegio Alemán	3	0	0	3	56	102	−46	0	5–8th place semifinals

Source: solumaxsolutions.com.br
(H) Hosts

All times are local (UTC–3).

22 May; 14:00	UNLu (Argentina)	34–21	(Uruguay) Colegio Alemán	Ginásio CEMTE, Taubaté; Attendance: 180; Referees: Menezes, Pinto (BRA)
22 May; 14:00	Vera 6	(21–6)	Martín 8	Ginásio CEMTE, Taubaté; Attendance: 180; Referees: Menezes, Pinto (BRA)
22 May; 14:00	3× (yellow card) 5× (suspension)	Report	1× (yellow card) 2× (suspension) 1× (red card)	Ginásio CEMTE, Taubaté; Attendance: 180; Referees: Menezes, Pinto (BRA)

22 May; 20:00	Handebol Taubaté (Brazil)	37–14	(Chile) Ovalle Balonmano	Ginásio CEMTE, Taubaté
22 May; 20:00		(21–4)		Ginásio CEMTE, Taubaté

23 May; 14:00	Ovalle Balonmano (Chile)	19–31	(Argentina) UNLu	Ginásio CEMTE, Taubaté; Attendance: 150; Referees: Marques, Magalhães (BRA)
23 May; 14:00	Flores 6	(8–12)	F. Fernández 5	Ginásio CEMTE, Taubaté; Attendance: 150; Referees: Marques, Magalhães (BRA)
23 May; 14:00	3× (yellow card) 6× (suspension) 1× (red card)	Report	3× (yellow card) 3× (suspension)	Ginásio CEMTE, Taubaté; Attendance: 150; Referees: Marques, Magalhães (BRA)

23 May; 20:00	Colegio Alemán (Uruguay)	13–41	(Brazil) Handebol Taubaté	Ginásio CEMTE, Taubaté; Attendance: 200; Referees: Estrada, Pineda (COL)
23 May; 20:00	Remlinger, Ruiz 3	(4–19)	Andrade, Lobato 6	Ginásio CEMTE, Taubaté; Attendance: 200; Referees: Estrada, Pineda (COL)
23 May; 20:00	1× (yellow card) 1× (suspension)	Report	2× (yellow card) 3× (suspension)	Ginásio CEMTE, Taubaté; Attendance: 200; Referees: Estrada, Pineda (COL)

24 May; 14:00	Ovalle Balonmano (Chile)	27–22	(Uruguay) Colegio Alemán	Ginásio CEMTE, Taubaté; Attendance: 100; Referees: Correa, Conberse (ARG)
24 May; 14:00	Oyarzun 7	(15–9)	Sintas 7	Ginásio CEMTE, Taubaté; Attendance: 100; Referees: Correa, Conberse (ARG)
24 May; 14:00	2× (yellow card) 5× (suspension)	Report	4× (suspension)	Ginásio CEMTE, Taubaté; Attendance: 100; Referees: Correa, Conberse (ARG)

24 May; 18:00	Handebol Taubaté (Brazil)	32–15	(Argentina) UNLu	Ginásio CEMTE, Taubaté; Attendance: 150; Referees: Grillo, Lenci (ARG)
24 May; 18:00	Borges 5	(20–7)	Robert 4	Ginásio CEMTE, Taubaté; Attendance: 150; Referees: Grillo, Lenci (ARG)
24 May; 18:00	1× (yellow card) 7× (suspension)	Report	2× (yellow card) 4× (suspension)	Ginásio CEMTE, Taubaté; Attendance: 150; Referees: Grillo, Lenci (ARG)

=== Group B ===
Pos	Team	Pld	W	D	L	GF	GA	GD	Pts	Qualification
1	(Argentina) SAG Villa Ballester	3	3	0	0	111	67	+44	6	Semifinals
2	(Brazil) EC Pinheiros	3	2	0	1	118	61	+57	4	Semifinals
3	(Uruguay) Scuola Italiana	3	1	0	2	58	100	−42	2	5–8th place semifinals
4	(Chile) Luterano de Valparaíso	3	0	0	3	65	124	−59	0	5–8th place semifinals

Source: solumaxsolutions.com.br

22 May; 16:00	SAG Villa Ballester (Argentina)	46–20	(Chile) Luterano de Valparaíso	Ginásio CEMTE, Taubaté; Attendance: 100; Referees: Marques, Magalhães (BRA)
22 May; 16:00	Soto 8	(23–11)	Frelijj 9	Ginásio CEMTE, Taubaté; Attendance: 100; Referees: Marques, Magalhães (BRA)
22 May; 16:00	2× (yellow card)	Report	1× (yellow card) 1× (suspension)	Ginásio CEMTE, Taubaté; Attendance: 100; Referees: Marques, Magalhães (BRA)

22 May; 18:00	EC Pinheiros (Brazil)	39–12	(Uruguay) Scuola Italiana	Ginásio CEMTE, Taubaté; Attendance: 100; Referees: Correa, Conberse (ARG)
22 May; 18:00	Reis 7	(16–4)	Ansolabehere 4	Ginásio CEMTE, Taubaté; Attendance: 100; Referees: Correa, Conberse (ARG)
22 May; 18:00	1× (yellow card) 2× (suspension)	Report	3× (suspension)	Ginásio CEMTE, Taubaté; Attendance: 100; Referees: Correa, Conberse (ARG)

23 May; 16:00	Scuola Italiana (Uruguay)	21–38	(Argentina) SAG Villa Ballester	Ginásio CEMTE, Taubaté; Attendance: 100; Referees: Menezes, Pinto (BRA)
23 May; 16:00	Botejara 5	(8–18)	Aizen 9	Ginásio CEMTE, Taubaté; Attendance: 100; Referees: Menezes, Pinto (BRA)
23 May; 16:00	2× (suspension)	Report	3× (yellow card) 4× (suspension)	Ginásio CEMTE, Taubaté; Attendance: 100; Referees: Menezes, Pinto (BRA)

23 May; 18:00	Luterano de Valparaíso (Chile)	22–53	(Brazil) EC Pinheiros	Ginásio CEMTE, Taubaté; Attendance: 200; Referees: Grillo, Lenci (ARG)
23 May; 18:00	three players 4	(9–31)	Peão 8	Ginásio CEMTE, Taubaté; Attendance: 200; Referees: Grillo, Lenci (ARG)
23 May; 18:00	1× (yellow card) 3× (suspension)	Report	1× (yellow card) 1× (suspension)	Ginásio CEMTE, Taubaté; Attendance: 200; Referees: Grillo, Lenci (ARG)

24 May; 16:00	Luterano de Valparaíso (Chile)	23–25	(Uruguay) Scuola Italiana	Ginásio CEMTE, Taubaté; Attendance: 100; Referees: Estrada, Pineda (COL)
24 May; 16:00	Frelijj 7	(10–9)	Fabra 8	Ginásio CEMTE, Taubaté; Attendance: 100; Referees: Estrada, Pineda (COL)
24 May; 16:00	1× (yellow card) 3× (suspension) 1× (red card)	Report	2× (yellow card) 4× (suspension)	Ginásio CEMTE, Taubaté; Attendance: 100; Referees: Estrada, Pineda (COL)

24 May; 20:00	SAG Villa Ballester (Argentina)	27–26	(Brazil) EC Pinheiros	Ginásio CEMTE, Taubaté; Attendance: 150; Referees: Menezes, Pinto (BRA)
24 May; 20:00	S. Cánepa 8	(13–13)	Hackbarth 7	Ginásio CEMTE, Taubaté; Attendance: 150; Referees: Menezes, Pinto (BRA)
24 May; 20:00	4× (yellow card) 3× (suspension)	Report	4× (yellow card) 4× (suspension)	Ginásio CEMTE, Taubaté; Attendance: 150; Referees: Menezes, Pinto (BRA)

== Knockout stage ==
=== Bracket ===
Semifinals
25 May
(Brazil) Handebol Taubaté	26
(Brazil) EC Pinheiros	20
25 May
(Argentina) UNLu	34
(Argentina) SAG Villa Ballester	29

Final
26 May
(Brazil) Handebol Taubaté	27
(Argentina) UNLu	21
Third place
26 May
(Brazil) EC Pinheiros	31
(Argentina) SAG Villa Ballester	22

5–8th place bracket

5–8th place semifinals
25 May
(Chile) Ovalle Balonmano	24
(Chile) Luterano de Valparaíso	19
25 May
(Uruguay) Colegio Alemán	16
(Uruguay) Scuola Italiana	29

Fifth place
26 May
(Chile) Ovalle Balonmano	32
(Uruguay) Scuola Italiana	23
Seventh place
26 May
(Chile) Luterano de Valparaíso	25
(Uruguay) Colegio Alemán	21

=== 5–8th place semifinals ===
25 May; 14:00	Ovalle Balonmano (Chile)	24–19	(Chile) Luterano de Valparaíso	Ginásio CEMTE, Taubaté; Attendance: 100; Referees: Correa, Conberse (ARG)
25 May; 14:00	Flores 8	(11–8)	Rivera 6	Ginásio CEMTE, Taubaté; Attendance: 100; Referees: Correa, Conberse (ARG)
25 May; 14:00	1× (yellow card) 6× (suspension) 2× (red card)	Report	2× (yellow card) 4× (suspension)	Ginásio CEMTE, Taubaté; Attendance: 100; Referees: Correa, Conberse (ARG)

25 May; 16:00	Colegio Alemán (Uruguay)	16–29	(Uruguay) Scuola Italiana	Ginásio CEMTE, Taubaté; Attendance: 100; Referees: Marques, Magalhães (BRA)
25 May; 16:00	Abdala 8	(6–13)	Fabra 6	Ginásio CEMTE, Taubaté; Attendance: 100; Referees: Marques, Magalhães (BRA)
25 May; 16:00	2× (yellow card) 1× (suspension)	Report	2× (yellow card) 3× (suspension)	Ginásio CEMTE, Taubaté; Attendance: 100; Referees: Marques, Magalhães (BRA)

=== Semifinals ===
25 May; 18:00	Handebol Taubaté (Brazil)	26–20	(Brazil) EC Pinheiros	Ginásio CEMTE, Taubaté; Attendance: 300; Referees: Grillo, Lenci (ARG)
25 May; 18:00	Gama 7	(13–10)	Silveira 4	Ginásio CEMTE, Taubaté; Attendance: 300; Referees: Grillo, Lenci (ARG)
25 May; 18:00	1× (yellow card) 5× (suspension)	Report	2× (yellow card) 3× (suspension)	Ginásio CEMTE, Taubaté; Attendance: 300; Referees: Grillo, Lenci (ARG)

25 May; 20:00	UNLu (Argentina)	34–29	(Argentina) SAG Villa Ballester	Ginásio CEMTE, Taubaté; Attendance: 150; Referees: Menezes, Pinto (BRA)
25 May; 20:00	F. Fernández, J. Fernández 7	(15–13)	S. Cánepa 6	Ginásio CEMTE, Taubaté; Attendance: 150; Referees: Menezes, Pinto (BRA)
25 May; 20:00	2× (yellow card) 4× (suspension)	Report	2× (yellow card) 9× (suspension) 2× (red card)	Ginásio CEMTE, Taubaté; Attendance: 150; Referees: Menezes, Pinto (BRA)

=== Seventh place game ===
26 May; 10:00	Luterano de Valparaíso (Chile)	25–21	(Uruguay) Colegio Alemán	Ginásio CEMTE, Taubaté; Attendance: 100; Referees: Estrada, Pineda (COL)
26 May; 10:00	Rivera 8	(12–8)	Sintas 5	Ginásio CEMTE, Taubaté; Attendance: 100; Referees: Estrada, Pineda (COL)
26 May; 10:00	1× (yellow card) 4× (suspension)	Report	2× (yellow card) 1× (suspension)	Ginásio CEMTE, Taubaté; Attendance: 100; Referees: Estrada, Pineda (COL)

=== Fifth place game ===
26 May; 14:00	Ovalle Balonmano (Chile)	32–23	(Uruguay) Scuola Italiana	Ginásio CEMTE, Taubaté; Attendance: 100; Referees: Correa, Conberse (ARG)
26 May; 14:00	Paulsen 7	(16–12)	Fabra 5	Ginásio CEMTE, Taubaté; Attendance: 100; Referees: Correa, Conberse (ARG)
26 May; 14:00	3× (yellow card) 6× (suspension) 1× (red card)	Report	1× (yellow card) 7× (suspension) 2× (red card)	Ginásio CEMTE, Taubaté; Attendance: 100; Referees: Correa, Conberse (ARG)

=== Third place game ===
26 May; 12:00	EC Pinheiros (Brazil)	31–22	(Argentina) SAG Villa Ballester	Ginásio CEMTE, Taubaté; Attendance: 200; Referees: Grillo, Lenci (ARG)
26 May; 12:00	De Souza, Hubner 6	(17–13)	Soto 6	Ginásio CEMTE, Taubaté; Attendance: 200; Referees: Grillo, Lenci (ARG)
26 May; 12:00	3× (yellow card) 2× (suspension)	Report	2× (yellow card) 2× (suspension)	Ginásio CEMTE, Taubaté; Attendance: 200; Referees: Grillo, Lenci (ARG)

=== Final ===
26 May; 16:00	Handebol Taubaté (Brazil)	27–21	(Argentina) UNLu	Ginásio CEMTE, Taubaté; Attendance: 420; Referees: Menezes, Pinto (BRA)
26 May; 16:00	Soares 6	(16–12)	J. Fernández 7	Ginásio CEMTE, Taubaté; Attendance: 420; Referees: Menezes, Pinto (BRA)
26 May; 16:00	4× (yellow card) 3× (suspension) 1× (red card)	Report	1× (yellow card) 5× (suspension)	Ginásio CEMTE, Taubaté; Attendance: 420; Referees: Menezes, Pinto (BRA)

== Final standing ==
Rank	Team
Gold medal	(Brazil) Handebol Taubaté
Silver medal	(Argentina) UNLu
Bronze medal	(Brazil) EC Pinheiros
4	(Argentina) SAG Villa Ballester
5	(Chile) Ovalle Balonmano
6	(Uruguay) Scuola Italiana
7	(Chile) Luterano de Valparaíso
8	(Uruguay) Colegio Alemán

Team qualified to the 2019 IHF Super Globe
