= German School of Montevideo =

Colegio y Liceo Alemán de Montevideo
- Deutsche Schule Montevideo

- The School in 2024

Location
- Av. Dr. Francisco Soca 1356; Montevideo; Uruguay; 34.9048°S 56.1552°W

Information
- Type: Private, bilingual
- Motto: "Educando para un mundo mejor" ("Educating for a better world")
- Established: 1857
- Director: Almut Hennings
- Campus: Urban
- Colors: Black, red, yellow
- Website: dsm.edu.uy

The Colegio y Liceo Alemán de Montevideo (German: Deutsche Schule Montevideo; English: German School of Montevideo) is one of the most prestigious private schools in Uruguay. It was established in 1857 for the children of German traders, artists, engineers and diplomats living in Montevideo.

Since the second half of the 20th century, this school is located in the neighborhood of Pocitos. And since the end of the century, it has another location at Barra de Carrasco, on Av. Giannattasio (east of Carrasco).

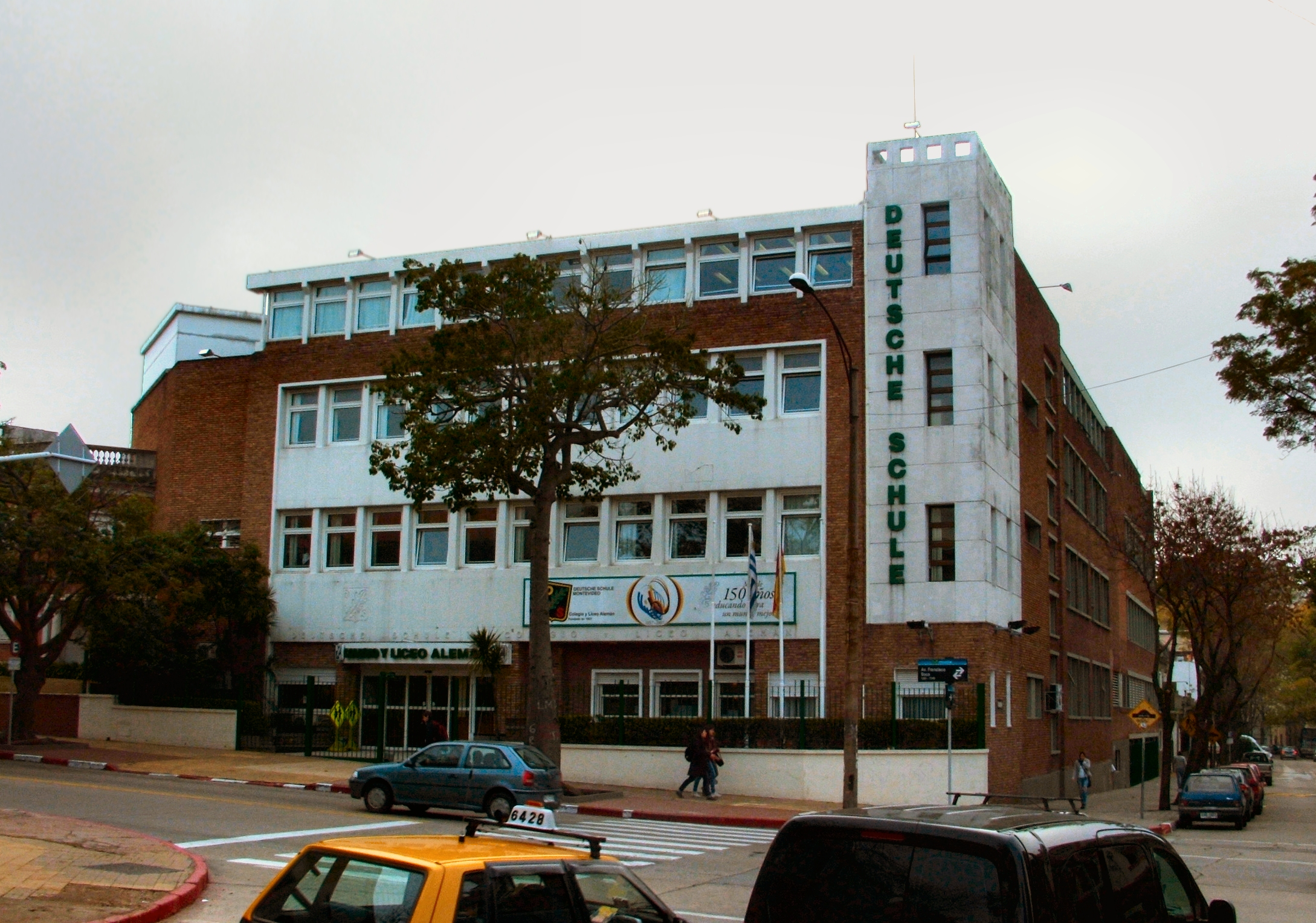
The school in 2013.

The school is also well known for having the best handball team in the country, having won most of the national tournaments.

== Organization and administration ==
The school is directed by Christofer Lahser, acting as general headmaster. The specific secondary school and primary school directors are Juan Carlos Noya and Stephanie Achatz, respectively.

=== Bicultural Baccalaureate ===
One of the most notable characteristics of the school, is the availability of a German Abitur-based high school diploma program, with most lessons taught in German. It is accepted by both Germany and Uruguay universities as a valid high school certificate. It is a trilingual, bicultural baccalaureate, teaching German, Spanish, and English classes, and teaching culture (Geography, history, traditions, etc.) of both Germany and Uruguay. It is considered more challenging than the standard program, and admission to it is dependent on grades and language skills.

=== Student Exchange Program ===
The student exchange program takes place every year in 4º Liceo (Tenth grade). Students must pay the two-month trip by themselves, as the school offers little to no trip scholarships. The destination is several cities in Germany, such as Munich, Berlin, Frankfurt and Hamburg for two weeks, after which each student is sent to live with its exchange family, separated from most others in a preset small village or major city. After those two months, they come back and house the same German student who they stayed with. Quota availability is varied and based on the number of people that confirmed being able to offer a house for people to stay there. The financial aspect is not the only determining factor, as students are required to have a high academical and behavioral standard by the end of the year, or else risk getting banned from the trip.

=== Student Council ===
Two student-elected representatives are chosen by classroom. The objective is for them to act as a link between the Student Parliament and the students, should any particular issue arise, and maintain them in constant knowledge, always putting the child's best interests in mind. Another one per grade form the permanent council of the Student Parliament which acts as the central governing body and as a link between the school, the parents and the direction. Meetings are formed monthly to discuss themes ranging from entertainment, sports and arts to infrastructure, technology and well-being. This is later managed by the heads of each sub-council and the Presidents of the Parliament, and passed on to the headmaster and staff if required. The direction of the school is responsive and actively cooperates with the council's feedback. The Student Parliament is directed by the students Juan Ignacio Dupetit and María Belén Menéndez.

== Notable alumni ==
- Jorge Batlle, politician, President of the Republic from 2000 to 2005
- Mario Benedetti, writer
- Antonio Lussich, politician
- Nelly Weissel, actress
- Facundo Ponce de León, philosopher and journalist
- Gonzalo Fernández, lawyer and politician
- Lorena Ponce de León, First Lady of Uruguay since 2020.

== See also ==
- German Uruguayan
