= Santiago Cánepa =

Argentine handball player

Personal information
- Full name: Santiago Alejo Cánepa
- Nationality: Argentine
- Born: 14 April 1991 (age 35)
- Height: 1.90 m (6 ft 3 in)

Sport
- Sport: Handball
- Position: Left Back
- Current club: Handebol Taubaté
- Number: 17
National team
Years	Team	Apps	(Gls)
2009 present	Argentina	35	(97)
Medal record
South and Central American Championship
Gold medal – first place	2020 Brazil
Silver medal – second place	2022 Brazil
- Updated on 13 March 2021

Santiago Alejo Cánepa is an Argentine handball player for Sociedad Alemana de Villa Ballester, Handebol Taubaté, Aranda and the Argentine national team.

He represented Argentina at the 2021 World Men's Handball Championship.
