= Handebol Clube Taubaté =

Brazilian handball club

Handebol Taubaté
- Full name: Handebol Clube Taubaté
- Short name: Taubaté
- Founded: 2013; 13 years ago
- Arena: Ginasio EMECAL
- Head coach: Marcus Tatá Oliveira
- League: Liga Nacional de Handebol
- 2017: 2nd
- Club colours
Home	Away

Handebol Clube Taubaté is a handball club from Taubaté, Brazil. Currently, they compete in the Brazilian National League and it is the current vice champion.

== Accomplishments ==
- São Paulo State Championship: 6
  - 2015, 2018, 2019, 2020, 2021, 2023
- Brazilian National League: 7
  - 2013, 2014, 2016, 2019, 2020, 2021, 2022
    - Runners-up: 3
      - 2015, 2017, 2018
- Pan American Men's Club Handball Championship: 5
  - 2013, 2014, 2015, 2016, 2018
- South and Central American Men's Club Handball Championship: 3
  - 2019, 2022, 2024
- Participantions in the IHF Super Globe:
  - 2013: 6th
  - 2014: 6th
  - 2015: 6th
  - 2016: 7th
  - 2018: 5th
  - 2019: 6th
  - 2022: 8th
  - 2024: 8th
  - 2025: 7th

== Team ==
=== Current squad ===
Squad for the 2022 IHF Super Globe

- (Brazil) Maik Santos
- (Brazil) Washington Luiz Santos
- (Brazil) Vinicius de Castro
- (Brazil) João Felipe Rodrigues
- (Brazil) Luiz André Saboia
- (Brazil) Fábio Sozzi Guimarães
- (Brazil) Cléber Andrade
- (Brazil) Pedro Augusto Telles
- (Brazil) Leandro Silva
- (Brazil) Mikael Cândido
- (Brazil) Felipe Roberto Braz
- (Brazil) Vinícius Teixeira
- (Brazil) Matheus Perrella
- (Brazil) Ronaldo Catarino
- (Brazil) João Henrique Rodrigues
- (Brazil) Gustavo de Andrade
