= 2014 Pan American Men's Club Handball Championship =

Tournament details
- Host country: Brazil
- Venue(s): 1 (in 1 host city)
- Dates: 28 May – 1 June
- Teams: 5 (from 1 confederation)

Final positions
- Champions: (Brazil) Handebol Taubaté (2nd title)
- Runner-up: (Brazil) EC Pinheiros
- Third place: (Argentina) Colegio Ward
- Fourth place: (Argentina) SAG Villa Ballester

Tournament statistics
- Matches played: 10
- Goals scored: 533 (53.3 per match)
- Top scorer(s): (Chile) Francisco Chacana (30 goals)

The 2014 Pan American Men's Club Handball Championship took place in Taubaté from 28 May to 1 June. It acts as the Pan American qualifying tournament for the 2014 IHF Super Globe.

== Teams ==
- (Argentina) Colegio Ward
- (Argentina) SAG Villa Ballester
- (Brazil) Handebol Taubaté
- (Brazil) EC Pinheiros
- (Chile) Luterano de Valparaíso

== Results ==
Team	Pld	W	D	L	GF	GA	GD	Pts
(Brazil) Handebol Taubaté	4	3	1	0	134	75	+59	7
(Brazil) EC Pinheiros	4	3	1	0	113	98	+15	7
(Argentina) Colegio Ward	4	2	0	2	90	104	-14	4
(Argentina) SAG Villa Ballester	4	1	0	3	116	115	+1	2
(Chile) Luterano de Valparaíso	4	0	0	4	80	141	–61	0

== Round robin ==
May 28; 18:00	Colegio Ward (Argentina)	28 – 16	(Chile) Luterano de Valparaíso	Taubaté
May 28; 18:00	Amato, Garcia 6	(17–8)	Chacana 8	Taubaté
May 28; 18:00	3× (yellow card) 3× (suspension)	Report	3× (yellow card) 3× (suspension)	Taubaté

May 28; 20:30	Handebol Taubaté (Brazil)	37 – 24	(Argentina) SAG Villa Ballester	Taubaté
May 28; 20:30	Teixeira 8	(18–10)	Cánepa 6	Taubaté
May 28; 20:30	2× (yellow card) 4× (suspension) 1× (red card)	Report	1× (yellow card) 5× (suspension)	Taubaté

May 29; 18:00	EC Pinheiros (Brazil)	28 – 27	(Argentina) SAG Villa Ballester	Taubaté
May 29; 18:00	Cruz 10	(11–17)	Cánepa 8	Taubaté
May 29; 18:00	3× (yellow card) 4× (suspension) 1× (red card)	Report	3× (yellow card) 3× (suspension)	Taubaté

May 29; 20:00	Handebol Taubaté (Brazil)	41 – 14	(Chile) Luterano de Valparaíso	Taubaté
May 29; 20:00	Ribeiro 10	(19–8)	Silva 5	Taubaté
May 29; 20:00	2× (yellow card) 3× (suspension)	Report	3× (yellow card) 4× (suspension)	Taubaté

May 30; 16:00	SAG Villa Ballester (Argentina)	41 – 25	(Chile) Luterano de Valparaíso	Taubaté
May 30; 16:00	Romano, Bono 6	(19–14)	Chacana, Caniu 5	Taubaté
May 30; 16:00	3× (yellow card) 4× (suspension)	Report	3× (yellow card) 6× (suspension)	Taubaté

May 30; 18:00	EC Pinheiros (Brazil)	31 – 23	(Argentina) Colegio Ward	Taubaté
May 30; 18:00	Langaro 10	(20–12)	Vainstein 5	Taubaté
May 30; 18:00	3× (yellow card) 3× (suspension)	Report	3× (yellow card) 2× (suspension)	Taubaté

May 31; 16:00	Handebol Taubaté (Brazil)	33 – 14	(Argentina) Colegio Ward	Taubaté
May 31; 16:00	Freitas 7	(17–7)	Garcia, Gotuzzo 3	Taubaté
May 31; 16:00	3× (yellow card) 3× (suspension)	Report	3× (yellow card) 1× (suspension) 1× (red card)	Taubaté

May 31; 18:00	EC Pinheiros (Brazil)	31 – 25	(Chile) Luterano de Valparaíso	Taubaté
May 31; 18:00	Medeiros 7	(17–14)	Chacana 11	Taubaté
May 31; 18:00	3× (yellow card) 5× (suspension)	Report	1× (yellow card) 4× (suspension)	Taubaté

June 1; 14:00	Colegio Ward (Argentina)	25 – 24	(Argentina) SAG Villa Ballester	Taubaté
June 1; 14:00	Vainstein, Cantore 6	(13–6)	Cánepa 7	Taubaté
June 1; 14:00	3× (yellow card) 4× (suspension)	Report	3× (yellow card) 4× (suspension)	Taubaté

June 1; 16:00	Handebol Taubaté (Brazil)	23 – 23	(Brazil) EC Pinheiros	Taubaté
June 1; 16:00	Silva, Freitas 5	(14–9)	Santana 5	Taubaté
June 1; 16:00	3× (yellow card) 5× (suspension)	Report	3× (yellow card) 4× (suspension) 1× (red card)	Taubaté

== Final standing ==
Rank	Team
Gold medal	(Brazil) Handebol Taubaté
Silver medal	(Brazil) EC Pinheiros
Bronze medal	(Argentina) Colegio Ward
4	(Argentina) SAG Villa Ballester
5	(Chile) Luterano de Valparaíso

Team qualified to the 2014 IHF Super Globe
