= Pan American Men's Club Handball Championship =

- Founded: 2007
- No. of teams: 4 - 8
- Country: PATHF American members
- Confederation: PATHF (America)
- Most recent champions: (Brazil) Handebol Clube Taubaté (5th title)
- Most titles: (Brazil) Handebol Clube Taubaté (5 titles)
- Level on pyramid: 1
- Website: http://www.panamhandball.org/
- 2018 Pan American Men's Club Handball Championship

The Pan American Men's Club Handball Championship, organized by the Pan-American Team Handball Federation, was the official competition for men's handball clubs of Americas, and took place every year. In addition to crowning the Pan American champions, the tournament also served as a qualifying tournament for the IHF Super Globe. After 2018, with the division of the Pan-American Federation into North America and the Caribbean Handball Confederation and South and Central America Handball Confederation, the competition was ended.

== Summary ==
Year	Host	Final			Third place match			Teams
Year	Host	Champion	Score	Runner-up	Third place	Score	Fourth place	Teams
I (2007); Details	(Brazil); São Bernardo	(Brazil); Metodista São Bernardo	No playoffs	(Brazil); Unifil Londrina	(Argentina); River Plate	No playoffs	(Uruguay); Colegio Alemán	4
II (2008); Details	(Brazil); Londrina	(Brazil); Metodista São Bernardo	No playoffs	(Brazil); Unopar	(Brazil); EC Pinheiros	No playoffs	(Argentina); Colegio Ward	5
III (2009); Details	(Brazil); Londrina	(Brazil); Unopar	No playoffs	(Brazil); Metodista São Bernardo	(Argentina); SAG Los Polvorines	No playoffs	(Argentina); River Plate	5
IV (2011); Details	(Brazil); São Bernardo	(Brazil); EC Pinheiros	33 – 22	(Brazil); Unopar	(Argentina); River Plate	30 – 27	(Brazil); Metodista São Bernardo	6
V (2012); Details	(Brazil); Londrina	(Brazil); Metodista São Bernardo	27 – 22	(Brazil); EC Pinheiros	(Argentina); River Plate	26 – 19	(Argentina); A.A.C.F. Quilmes	8
VI (2013); Details	(Brazil); Taubaté	(Brazil); Handebol Taubaté	25 – 23	(Brazil); EC Pinheiros	(Brazil); Metodista São Bernardo	30 – 27	(Argentina); River Plate	8
VII (2014); Details	(Brazil); Taubaté	(Brazil); Handebol Taubaté	No playoffs	(Brazil); EC Pinheiros	(Argentina); Colegio Ward	No playoffs	(Argentina); SAG Villa Ballester	5
VIII (2015); Details	(Brazil); Taubaté	(Brazil); Handebol Taubaté	No playoffs	(Brazil); EC Pinheiros	(Argentina); River Plate	No playoffs	(Argentina); SAG Villa Ballester	5
IX (2016); Details	(Argentina); Buenos Aires	(Brazil); Handebol Taubaté	28 – 23	(Brazil); EC Pinheiros	(Argentina); SAG Villa Ballester	33 – 27	(Argentina); River Plate	8
X (2017); Details	(Argentina); Buenos Aires	(Brazil); EC Pinheiros	28 – 20	(Brazil); Handebol Taubaté	(Argentina); UNLu	30 – 27	(Argentina); SAG Villa Ballester	6
XI (2018); Details	(Brazil); Taubaté	(Brazil); Handebol Taubaté	26 – 18	(Argentina); SAG Villa Ballester	(Brazil); EC Pinheiros	32 – 22	(Argentina); Ferro Carril Oeste	7

== Medal table ==
Locations of the Pan American Men's Club Handball Championship winners
All clubs except for Unopar are from the Brazil São Paulo State

=== Per Club ===
Rank	Club	Gold	Silver	Bronze	Total
1	(Brazil) Handebol Taubaté	5	1	0	6
2	(Brazil) Metodista São Bernardo	3	1	1	5
3	(Brazil) EC Pinheiros	2	5	2	9
4	(Brazil) Handebol Londrina	1	3	0	4
5	(Argentina) SAG Villa Ballester	0	1	1	2
6	(Argentina) River Plate	0	0	4	4
7	(Argentina) Colegio Ward	0	0	1	1
7	(Argentina) SAG Los Polvorines	0	0	1	1
7	(Argentina) UNLu	0	0	1	1
Totals (9 entries)		11	11	11	33

=== Per Nation ===
Rank	Nation	Gold	Silver	Bronze	Total
1	Brazil	11	10	3	24
2	Argentina	0	1	8	9
Totals (2 entries)		11	11	11	33
