= Esporte Clube Pinheiros (handball) =

Brazilian handball club

- Full name: Esporte Clube Pinheiros São Paulo (E.C.P.S.P.)
- Short name: E.C.P.
- Founded: 7 September 1899; 127 years ago
- Arena: Ginásio Poliesportivo Henrique Vilaboim
- Capacity: 1000
- Head coach: Sérgio Hortelan
- League: Liga Nacional de Handebol
- 2024: 1st
- Club colours
Home	Away

Esporte Clube Pinheiros, abbreviated as E.C. Pinheiros, is a handball club from São Paulo, Brazil. Currently, they compete in the Brazilian National League and it is the current champion. It is part of the multisports club Esporte Clube Pinheiros, founded under the name Sport Club Germânia (Sport Club Germany) on 7 September 1899.

EC Pinheiros is a recognized powerhouse in Brazilian handball, winning the Paulista Championship 30 times including the 2016 edition, the National League 6 times the last time being the 2015 edition and the Pan American Championship twice including the 2017 edition.

The women's team is achieving success recently, winning the first national championship in 2016.

== Accomplishments ==
=== Men's team ===
- São Paulo State Championship: 31
  - 1934, 1937, 1940, 1941, 1945, 1948, 1950, 1954, 1962, 1964, 1965, 1967, 1969–72, 1974, 1977, 1981, 1991, 1996–98, 2002, 2006, 2009, 2010, 2014, 2016,2017, 2022
- Brazilian National League: 9
  - 2007, 2009, 2010, 2011, 2012, 2015, 2017, 2018, 2020
- Pan American Men's Club Handball Championship: 2
  - 2011, 2017
- South and Central American Men's Club Handball Championship: 1
  - 2021
- Participantions in the IHF Super Globe:
  - 2011: 5th
  - 2017: 5th
  - 2021: 4th
  - 2026: 6th

=== Women's team ===
- São Paulo State Championship: 6
  - 2018, 2019, 2020, 2021, 2022, 2023
- Liga Nacional Feminina: 4
  - 2016, 2019, 2022, 2023
- Pan American Women's Club Handball Championship: 1
  - 2017
- South and Central American Women's Club Handball Championship: 3
  - 2022, 2023, 2024

== Current squad ==
=== Men's team ===
Squad for the 2021 IHF Super Globe

- 02 (Brazil) Edney Silva Oliveira
- 03 (Brazil) Fabio Lima Marques
- 06 (Brazil) Lucas Cândido
- 08 (Brazil) Arthur Flosi
- 11 (Brazil) Gabriel Silva dos Reis
- 13 (Brazil) Diogo Hubner
- 16 (Brazil) Marcos Paulo Santos
- 18 (Brazil) Guilherme Perbelini
- 19 (Brazil) Phillipp Seifert
- 23 (Brazil) Marcos Antonio da Silva
- 24 (Brazil) Guilherme Valadão Gama
- 25 (Brazil) Davi Langaro
- 26 (Brazil) Bryan Monte
- 55 (Brazil) Caue Ceccon
- 88 (Brazil) Tarcisio Freitas Oliveira
- 99 (Brazil) Mateus Nascimento Martins

=== Women's team ===
Squad for the 2023 South and Central American Women's Club Handball Championship

- 03 Julia Rodrigues
- 07 Maria dos Santos
- 08 Gabriella Mendes
- 09 Rafaela Costa
- 10 Nicole Damascena
- 11 Barbarah Monteiro
- 13 Fernanda Couto
- 15 Rebeca Araujo
- 16 Jessica Antunes
- 20 Maryanna Ferreira
- 22 (Brazil) Mayara Moura
- 26 Rafaela Faure
- 27 Jessica de Oliveira
- 28 Micaela da Silva
- 33 Livia Oliveira
- 91 (Brazil) Lívia Ventura
