= 2015 Men's Junior World Handball Championship =

Sport tournament

Tournament details
- Host country: Brazil
- Venues: 2 (in 2 host cities)
- Dates: 19 July – 1 August 2015
- Teams: 24 (from 4 confederations)

Final positions
- Champions: France (1st title)
- Runners-up: Denmark
- Third place: Germany
- Fourth place: Egypt

Tournament statistics
- Matches played: 92
- Goals scored: 5,250 (57.07 per match)
- Top scorers: (Romania) Nicusor Negru (70 goals)

Awards
- Best player: (France) Florian Delecroix

The 2015 IHF Men's Junior World Championship was the 20th edition of the tournament and held at Brazil from 19 July to 1 August 2015. The decision to select Brazil as the host was announced 1 August 2014. France won their first title by defeating Denmark 26–24 in the final.

== Host cities ==
The tournament took place entirely in Minas Gerais. Matches will be held in the cities of Uberlândia and Uberaba.

== Qualified teams ==
The Oceania Federation withdrew, Portugal was named the replacement.

Europe

- Belarus (Winner qualification group 5)
- Denmark (Winner 2013 Men's Youth World Handball Championship)
- France (Winner qualification group 2)
- Germany (Winner 2014 European Men's Junior Handball Championship) (2009 and 2011 Junior World Champions)
- Netherlands (Winner qualification group 3)
- Norway (Winner qualification group 4)
- Romania (Winner qualification group 6)
- Russia (Winner qualification group 1)
- Serbia (Winner qualification group 8)
- Spain (Winner qualification group 7)
- Sweden (Runner-Up 2014 European Men's Junior Handball Championship) (2003, 2007 and current 2013 Junior World Champions)
- Portugal (Substitution) (Runner-Up qualification group 7)

Africa

- Algeria (4th 2014 African Men's Junior Handball Championship)
- Angola (3rd 2014 African Men's Junior Handball Championship)
- Egypt (Winner 2014 African Men's Junior Handball Championship)
- Tunisia (Runner-Up 2014 African Men's Junior Handball Championship)

Asia

- Japan
- Qatar
- South Korea

Americas

- Argentina (Runner-Up 2015 Pan American Men's Junior Handball Championship)
- Brazil (Host) (Winner 2015 Pan American Men's Junior Handball Championship)
- Chile (3rd 2015 Pan American Men's Junior Handball Championship)
- Paraguay (additional 4th place as Brazil is host of tournament) (5th 2015 Pan American Men's Junior Handball Championship))
- Uruguay (4th 2015 Pan American Men's Junior Handball Championship)

== Preliminary round ==
The draw was held on 21 May 2015.

All times are local (UTC−3).

=== Group A ===
Pos	Team	Pld	W	D	L	GF	GA	GD	Pts	Qualification
1	Sweden	5	5	0	0	210	108	+102	10	Advanced to knockout stage
2	Belarus	5	4	0	1	181	130	+51	8	Advanced to knockout stage
3	Tunisia	5	3	0	2	153	142	+11	6	Advanced to knockout stage
4	Russia	5	2	0	3	165	168	−3	4	Advanced to knockout stage
5	Netherlands	5	1	0	4	149	165	−16	2	
6	Paraguay	5	0	0	5	95	240	−145	0	

Source: ihf.info
Rules for classification: 1) points; 2) head-to-head points; 3) head-to-head goal difference; 4) head-to-head number of goals scored; 5) Goal difference.

20 July 2015; 09:30	Sweden	35–27	Tunisia	Ginásio Municipal Tancredo Neves, Uberlândia; Attendance: 200; Referees: Brkić, Jusufhodžić (AUT)
20 July 2015; 09:30	Tollbring, Zetterman 5	(17–11)	Abdelli 8	Ginásio Municipal Tancredo Neves, Uberlândia; Attendance: 200; Referees: Brkić, Jusufhodžić (AUT)
20 July 2015; 09:30	3× (yellow card) 3× (suspension)	Report	3× (yellow card) 3× (suspension)	Ginásio Municipal Tancredo Neves, Uberlândia; Attendance: 200; Referees: Brkić, Jusufhodžić (AUT)

20 July 2015; 11:45	Netherlands	25–37	Belarus	Ginásio Municipal Tancredo Neves, Uberlândia; Attendance: 200; Referees: Gonzales, Prieto (URU)
20 July 2015; 11:45	Berendsen 6	(12–15)	Harbuz 7	Ginásio Municipal Tancredo Neves, Uberlândia; Attendance: 200; Referees: Gonzales, Prieto (URU)
20 July 2015; 11:45	3× (yellow card) 2× (suspension)	Report	2× (yellow card) 5× (suspension)	Ginásio Municipal Tancredo Neves, Uberlândia; Attendance: 200; Referees: Gonzales, Prieto (URU)

20 July 2015; 20:45	Russia	44–30	Paraguay	Ginásio Municipal Tancredo Neves, Uberlândia; Attendance: 300; Referees: Erdoğan, Özdeniz (TUR)
20 July 2015; 20:45	Shkurinskiy 9	(18–14)	Garcete 8	Ginásio Municipal Tancredo Neves, Uberlândia; Attendance: 300; Referees: Erdoğan, Özdeniz (TUR)
20 July 2015; 20:45	2× (yellow card) 4× (suspension)	Report	3× (yellow card) 3× (suspension)	Ginásio Municipal Tancredo Neves, Uberlândia; Attendance: 300; Referees: Erdoğan, Özdeniz (TUR)

21 July 2015; 16:15	Tunisia	31–28	Russia	Ginásio Municipal Tancredo Neves, Uberlândia; Attendance: 250; Referees: Kolahdouzan, Mousavian (IRN)
21 July 2015; 16:15	Abdelli 7	(15–16)	Shkurinskiy 9	Ginásio Municipal Tancredo Neves, Uberlândia; Attendance: 250; Referees: Kolahdouzan, Mousavian (IRN)
21 July 2015; 16:15	3× (yellow card) 1× (suspension)	Report	2× (yellow card) 2× (suspension)	Ginásio Municipal Tancredo Neves, Uberlândia; Attendance: 250; Referees: Kolahdouzan, Mousavian (IRN)

21 July 2015; 18:30	Belarus	23–38	Sweden	Ginásio Municipal Tancredo Neves, Uberlândia; Attendance: 250; Referees: Alves, Magalhães (BRA)
21 July 2015; 18:30	Karvatski 5	(12–17)	Tollbring 10	Ginásio Municipal Tancredo Neves, Uberlândia; Attendance: 250; Referees: Alves, Magalhães (BRA)
21 July 2015; 18:30	4× (yellow card) 2× (suspension)	Report	1× (yellow card) 3× (suspension)	Ginásio Municipal Tancredo Neves, Uberlândia; Attendance: 250; Referees: Alves, Magalhães (BRA)

21 July 2015; 20:45	Paraguay	18–52	Netherlands	Ginásio Municipal Tancredo Neves, Uberlândia; Attendance: 700; Referees: Pétursson, Sigurjónsson (ISL)
21 July 2015; 20:45	Garcete 9	(7–24)	Berendsen 13	Ginásio Municipal Tancredo Neves, Uberlândia; Attendance: 700; Referees: Pétursson, Sigurjónsson (ISL)
21 July 2015; 20:45	4× (yellow card) 5× (suspension) 1× (red card)	Report	3× (yellow card) 7× (suspension)	Ginásio Municipal Tancredo Neves, Uberlândia; Attendance: 700; Referees: Pétursson, Sigurjónsson (ISL)

23 July 2015; 09:30	Sweden	52–10	Paraguay	Ginásio Municipal Tancredo Neves, Uberlândia; Referees: Al-Mutawa, Al-Suwailem (KUW)
23 July 2015; 09:30	Mörk 9	(20–3)	Bordon 3	Ginásio Municipal Tancredo Neves, Uberlândia; Referees: Al-Mutawa, Al-Suwailem (KUW)
23 July 2015; 09:30	2× (yellow card) 1× (suspension)	Report	3× (yellow card) 1× (suspension)	Ginásio Municipal Tancredo Neves, Uberlândia; Referees: Al-Mutawa, Al-Suwailem (KUW)

23 July 2015; 11:45	Russia	37–25	Netherlands	Ginásio Municipal Tancredo Neves, Uberlândia; Referees: Erdoğan, Özdeniz (TUR)
23 July 2015; 11:45	Shkurinskiy 11	(20–16)	Berendsen 7	Ginásio Municipal Tancredo Neves, Uberlândia; Referees: Erdoğan, Özdeniz (TUR)
23 July 2015; 11:45	3× (yellow card) 3× (suspension)	Report	3× (yellow card) 2× (suspension)	Ginásio Municipal Tancredo Neves, Uberlândia; Referees: Erdoğan, Özdeniz (TUR)

23 July 2015; 14:00	Tunisia	23–31	Belarus	Ginásio Municipal Tancredo Neves, Uberlândia; Attendance: 200; Referees: Gonzales, Prieto (URU)
23 July 2015; 14:00	Berry, Dhouibi 5	(9–18)	Karalek, Vailupau 7	Ginásio Municipal Tancredo Neves, Uberlândia; Attendance: 200; Referees: Gonzales, Prieto (URU)
23 July 2015; 14:00	3× (yellow card) 4× (suspension)	Report	4× (yellow card) 6× (suspension)	Ginásio Municipal Tancredo Neves, Uberlândia; Attendance: 200; Referees: Gonzales, Prieto (URU)

24 July 2015; 14:00	Netherlands	20–44	Sweden	Ginásio Municipal Tancredo Neves, Uberlândia; Attendance: 200; Referees: Brkić, Jusufhodžić (AUT)
24 July 2015; 14:00	Berendsen 5	(9–19)	Tollbring 7	Ginásio Municipal Tancredo Neves, Uberlândia; Attendance: 200; Referees: Brkić, Jusufhodžić (AUT)
24 July 2015; 14:00	2× (yellow card) 3× (suspension)	Report	3× (yellow card) 4× (suspension)	Ginásio Municipal Tancredo Neves, Uberlândia; Attendance: 200; Referees: Brkić, Jusufhodžić (AUT)

24 July 2015; 16:15	Russia	28–41	Belarus	Ginásio Municipal Tancredo Neves, Uberlândia; Attendance: 200; Referees: Pétursson, Sigurjónsson (ISL)
24 July 2015; 16:15	Chernov 8	(13–18)	Karvatski 7	Ginásio Municipal Tancredo Neves, Uberlândia; Attendance: 200; Referees: Pétursson, Sigurjónsson (ISL)
24 July 2015; 16:15	3× (yellow card) 4× (suspension)	Report	3× (yellow card) 1× (suspension)	Ginásio Municipal Tancredo Neves, Uberlândia; Attendance: 200; Referees: Pétursson, Sigurjónsson (ISL)

24 July 2015; 20:45	Paraguay	21–43	Tunisia	Ginásio Municipal Tancredo Neves, Uberlândia; Attendance: 100; Referees: Kolahdouzan, Mousavian (IRN)
24 July 2015; 20:45	Pérez, Rodas 4	(9–22)	Berry 9	Ginásio Municipal Tancredo Neves, Uberlândia; Attendance: 100; Referees: Kolahdouzan, Mousavian (IRN)
24 July 2015; 20:45	2× (yellow card) 7× (suspension)	Report	3× (yellow card) 4× (suspension)	Ginásio Municipal Tancredo Neves, Uberlândia; Attendance: 100; Referees: Kolahdouzan, Mousavian (IRN)

26 July 2015; 09:30	Belarus	49–16	Paraguay	Ginásio Municipal Tancredo Neves, Uberlândia; Attendance: 100; Referees: Gasmi, Gasmi (FRA)
26 July 2015; 09:30	Vailupau 8	(26–8)	Pérez 6	Ginásio Municipal Tancredo Neves, Uberlândia; Attendance: 100; Referees: Gasmi, Gasmi (FRA)
26 July 2015; 09:30	3× (yellow card) 1× (suspension)	Report	3× (yellow card) 3× (suspension) 1× (red card)	Ginásio Municipal Tancredo Neves, Uberlândia; Attendance: 100; Referees: Gasmi, Gasmi (FRA)

26 July 2015; 11:45	Netherlands	27–29	Tunisia	Ginásio Municipal Tancredo Neves, Uberlândia; Attendance: 100; Referees: Alves, Magalhães (BRA)
26 July 2015; 11:45	Jansen 7	(12–15)	three players 6	Ginásio Municipal Tancredo Neves, Uberlândia; Attendance: 100; Referees: Alves, Magalhães (BRA)
26 July 2015; 11:45	4× (yellow card) 3× (suspension)	Report	3× (yellow card) 1× (suspension)	Ginásio Municipal Tancredo Neves, Uberlândia; Attendance: 100; Referees: Alves, Magalhães (BRA)

26 July 2015; 14:00	Sweden	41–28	Russia	Ginásio Municipal Tancredo Neves, Uberlândia; Attendance: 100; Referees: Gonzales, Prieto (URU)
26 July 2015; 14:00	Tollbring 9	(24–14)	Shkurinskiy 13	Ginásio Municipal Tancredo Neves, Uberlândia; Attendance: 100; Referees: Gonzales, Prieto (URU)
26 July 2015; 14:00	3× (yellow card) 4× (suspension)	Report	1× (yellow card) 4× (suspension) 1× (red card)	Ginásio Municipal Tancredo Neves, Uberlândia; Attendance: 100; Referees: Gonzales, Prieto (URU)

=== Group B ===
Pos	Team	Pld	W	D	L	GF	GA	GD	Pts	Qualification
1	Spain	5	4	0	1	134	107	+27	8	Advanced to knockout stage
2	Romania	5	2	2	1	136	130	+6	6 (Note: Qatar–Romania 31–32)	Advanced to knockout stage
3	Qatar	5	3	0	2	130	138	−8	6	Advanced to knockout stage
4	Portugal	5	2	1	2	120	127	−7	5 (Note: Portugal–Serbia 27–24)	Advanced to knockout stage
5	Serbia	5	2	1	2	134	112	+22	5	
6	Angola	5	0	0	5	113	153	−40	0	

Source: ihf.info
Rules for classification: 1) points; 2) head-to-head points; 3) head-to-head goal difference; 4) head-to-head number of goals scored; 5) Goal difference.
Notes:

20 July 2015; 14:00	Spain	26–27	Qatar	Ginásio Municipal Tancredo Neves, Uberlândia; Attendance: 250; Referees: Gasmi, Gasmi (FRA)
20 July 2015; 14:00	Aleix 7	(16–11)	Madadi 8	Ginásio Municipal Tancredo Neves, Uberlândia; Attendance: 250; Referees: Gasmi, Gasmi (FRA)
20 July 2015; 14:00	3× (yellow card) 3× (suspension)	Report	3× (yellow card) 5× (suspension)	Ginásio Municipal Tancredo Neves, Uberlândia; Attendance: 250; Referees: Gasmi, Gasmi (FRA)

20 July 2015; 16:15	Romania	26–26	Portugal	Ginásio Municipal Tancredo Neves, Uberlândia; Attendance: 300; Referees: Al-Mutawa, Al-Suwailem (KUW)
20 July 2015; 16:15	Negru 7	(11–15)	M. Martins 7	Ginásio Municipal Tancredo Neves, Uberlândia; Attendance: 300; Referees: Al-Mutawa, Al-Suwailem (KUW)
20 July 2015; 16:15	1× (yellow card) 4× (suspension) 1× (red card)	Report	4× (yellow card) 4× (suspension) 2× (red card)	Ginásio Municipal Tancredo Neves, Uberlândia; Attendance: 300; Referees: Al-Mutawa, Al-Suwailem (KUW)

20 July 2015; 18:30	Serbia	31–14	Angola	Ginásio Municipal Tancredo Neves, Uberlândia; Attendance: 150; Referees: Kolahdouzan, Mousavian (IRN)
20 July 2015; 18:30	Šotić 5	(16–3)	Nascimento 7	Ginásio Municipal Tancredo Neves, Uberlândia; Attendance: 150; Referees: Kolahdouzan, Mousavian (IRN)
20 July 2015; 18:30	3× (yellow card) 4× (suspension)	Report	3× (yellow card) 4× (suspension)	Ginásio Municipal Tancredo Neves, Uberlândia; Attendance: 150; Referees: Kolahdouzan, Mousavian (IRN)

22 July 2015; 16:15	Qatar	31–32	Romania	Ginásio Municipal Tancredo Neves, Uberlândia; Attendance: 200; Referees: Erdoğan, Özdeniz (TUR)
22 July 2015; 16:15	Denguir 10	(16–16)	Somlea 10	Ginásio Municipal Tancredo Neves, Uberlândia; Attendance: 200; Referees: Erdoğan, Özdeniz (TUR)
22 July 2015; 16:15	3× (yellow card) 3× (suspension) 1× (red card)	Report	4× (yellow card) 8× (suspension) 2× (red card)	Ginásio Municipal Tancredo Neves, Uberlândia; Attendance: 200; Referees: Erdoğan, Özdeniz (TUR)

22 July 2015; 18:30	Angola	21–32	Spain	Ginásio Municipal Tancredo Neves, Uberlândia; Attendance: 200; Referees: Gonzales, Prieto (URU)
22 July 2015; 18:30	Nhati, Sibo 7	(12–17)	Del Valle 9	Ginásio Municipal Tancredo Neves, Uberlândia; Attendance: 200; Referees: Gonzales, Prieto (URU)
22 July 2015; 18:30	2× (yellow card) 5× (suspension) 1× (red card)	Report	4× (yellow card) 2× (suspension)	Ginásio Municipal Tancredo Neves, Uberlândia; Attendance: 200; Referees: Gonzales, Prieto (URU)

22 July 2015; 20:45	Portugal	27–24	Serbia	Ginásio Municipal Tancredo Neves, Uberlândia; Attendance: 550; Referees: Gasmi, Gasmi (FRA)
22 July 2015; 20:45	Leitão 6	(16–13)	Đukić 6	Ginásio Municipal Tancredo Neves, Uberlândia; Attendance: 550; Referees: Gasmi, Gasmi (FRA)
22 July 2015; 20:45	4× (yellow card) 6× (suspension)	Report	4× (yellow card) 4× (suspension)	Ginásio Municipal Tancredo Neves, Uberlândia; Attendance: 550; Referees: Gasmi, Gasmi (FRA)

23 July 2015; 16:15	Qatar	24–23	Angola	Ginásio Municipal Tancredo Neves, Uberlândia; Attendance: 200; Referees: Alves, Magalhães (BRA)
23 July 2015; 16:15	Al-Buainain 5	(12–10)	Pascoal 9	Ginásio Municipal Tancredo Neves, Uberlândia; Attendance: 200; Referees: Alves, Magalhães (BRA)
23 July 2015; 16:15	3× (yellow card) 3× (suspension)	Report	1× (yellow card) 9× (suspension) 2× (red card)	Ginásio Municipal Tancredo Neves, Uberlândia; Attendance: 200; Referees: Alves, Magalhães (BRA)

23 July 2015; 18:30	Romania	21–21	Serbia	Ginásio Municipal Tancredo Neves, Uberlândia; Attendance: 200; Referees: Brkić, Jusufhodžić (AUT)
23 July 2015; 18:30	Negru 6	(13–9)	Kurteš, Terzić 4	Ginásio Municipal Tancredo Neves, Uberlândia; Attendance: 200; Referees: Brkić, Jusufhodžić (AUT)
23 July 2015; 18:30	3× (yellow card) 4× (suspension) 1× (red card)	Report	3× (yellow card) 7× (suspension)	Ginásio Municipal Tancredo Neves, Uberlândia; Attendance: 200; Referees: Brkić, Jusufhodžić (AUT)

23 July 2015; 20:45	Spain	25–20	Portugal	Ginásio Municipal Tancredo Neves, Uberlândia; Attendance: 300; Referees: Kolahdouzan, Mousavian (IRN)
23 July 2015; 20:45	Arino 5	(12–12)	M. Martins 7	Ginásio Municipal Tancredo Neves, Uberlândia; Attendance: 300; Referees: Kolahdouzan, Mousavian (IRN)
23 July 2015; 20:45	3× (yellow card) 2× (suspension)	Report	4× (yellow card) 5× (suspension)	Ginásio Municipal Tancredo Neves, Uberlândia; Attendance: 300; Referees: Kolahdouzan, Mousavian (IRN)

25 July 2015; 15:30	Romania	39–29	Angola	Ginásio Municipal Tancredo Neves, Uberlândia; Referees: Brkić, Jusufhodžić (AUT)
25 July 2015; 15:30	Negru 18	(20–14)	Sibo 10	Ginásio Municipal Tancredo Neves, Uberlândia; Referees: Brkić, Jusufhodžić (AUT)
25 July 2015; 15:30	3× (yellow card) 3× (suspension)	Report	3× (yellow card) 6× (suspension)	Ginásio Municipal Tancredo Neves, Uberlândia; Referees: Brkić, Jusufhodžić (AUT)

25 July 2015; 17:45	Serbia	21–28	Spain	Ginásio Municipal Tancredo Neves, Uberlândia; Attendance: 200; Referees: Gasmi, Gasmi (FRA)
25 July 2015; 17:45	Mladenović 8	(13–12)	Arino 6	Ginásio Municipal Tancredo Neves, Uberlândia; Attendance: 200; Referees: Gasmi, Gasmi (FRA)
25 July 2015; 17:45	4× (yellow card) 4× (suspension)	Report	4× (yellow card) 1× (suspension)	Ginásio Municipal Tancredo Neves, Uberlândia; Attendance: 200; Referees: Gasmi, Gasmi (FRA)

25 July 2015; 20:00	Portugal	20–26	Qatar	Ginásio Municipal Tancredo Neves, Uberlândia; Referees: Lah, Sok (SLO)
25 July 2015; 20:00	Mourão 6	(7–12)	Sassi 7	Ginásio Municipal Tancredo Neves, Uberlândia; Referees: Lah, Sok (SLO)
25 July 2015; 20:00	3× (yellow card) 5× (suspension)	Report	3× (yellow card) 3× (suspension)	Ginásio Municipal Tancredo Neves, Uberlândia; Referees: Lah, Sok (SLO)

26 July 2015; 16:15	Angola	26–27	Portugal	Ginásio Municipal Tancredo Neves, Uberlândia; Attendance: 200; Referees: Al-Mutawa, Al-Suwailem (KUW)
26 July 2015; 16:15	Nascimento 9	(14–12)	M. Martins 9	Ginásio Municipal Tancredo Neves, Uberlândia; Attendance: 200; Referees: Al-Mutawa, Al-Suwailem (KUW)
26 July 2015; 16:15	3× (yellow card) 4× (suspension)	Report	3× (yellow card) 2× (suspension)	Ginásio Municipal Tancredo Neves, Uberlândia; Attendance: 200; Referees: Al-Mutawa, Al-Suwailem (KUW)

26 July 2015; 18:30	Serbia	37–22	Qatar	Ginásio Municipal Tancredo Neves, Uberlândia; Referees: Pétursson, Sigurjónsson (ISL)
26 July 2015; 18:30	Milosavljev 16	(15–13)	Demirović 10	Ginásio Municipal Tancredo Neves, Uberlândia; Referees: Pétursson, Sigurjónsson (ISL)
26 July 2015; 18:30	3× (yellow card) 3× (suspension)	Report	5× (yellow card) 3× (suspension) 1× (red card)	Ginásio Municipal Tancredo Neves, Uberlândia; Referees: Pétursson, Sigurjónsson (ISL)

26 July 2015; 20:45	Spain	23–18	Romania	Ginásio Municipal Tancredo Neves, Uberlândia; Attendance: 200; Referees: Erdoğan, Özdeniz (TUR)
26 July 2015; 20:45	Aleix 7	(15–12)	Racoțea 7	Ginásio Municipal Tancredo Neves, Uberlândia; Attendance: 200; Referees: Erdoğan, Özdeniz (TUR)
26 July 2015; 20:45	3× (yellow card) 7× (suspension)	Report	2× (yellow card) 4× (suspension)	Ginásio Municipal Tancredo Neves, Uberlândia; Attendance: 200; Referees: Erdoğan, Özdeniz (TUR)

=== Group C ===
Pos	Team	Pld	W	D	L	GF	GA	GD	Pts	Qualification
1	France	5	5	0	0	163	123	+40	10	Advanced to knockout stage
2	Denmark	5	4	0	1	165	121	+44	8	Advanced to knockout stage
3	South Korea	5	3	0	2	153	133	+20	6	Advanced to knockout stage
4	Argentina	5	2	0	3	114	123	−9	4	Advanced to knockout stage
5	Algeria	5	1	0	4	117	145	−28	2	
6	Chile	5	0	0	5	104	171	−67	0	

Source: ihf.info
Rules for classification: 1) points; 2) head-to-head points; 3) head-to-head goal difference; 4) head-to-head number of goals scored; 5) Goal difference.

20 July 2015; 11:45	Denmark	39–20	Chile	Arena Máquinas, Uberaba; Attendance: 100; Referees: Boualloucha, Khenissi (TUN)
20 July 2015; 11:45	four players 6	(18–10)	Ayala, Velis 4	Arena Máquinas, Uberaba; Attendance: 100; Referees: Boualloucha, Khenissi (TUN)
20 July 2015; 11:45	3× (yellow card) 3× (suspension)	Report	3× (yellow card) 5× (suspension)	Arena Máquinas, Uberaba; Attendance: 100; Referees: Boualloucha, Khenissi (TUN)

20 July 2015; 14:00	France	26–25	Algeria	Arena Máquinas, Uberaba; Attendance: 200; Referees: Lah, Sok (SLO)
20 July 2015; 14:00	Traore, Tritta 4	(13–11)	four players 4	Arena Máquinas, Uberaba; Attendance: 200; Referees: Lah, Sok (SLO)
20 July 2015; 14:00	3× (yellow card) 4× (suspension)	Report	3× (yellow card) 6× (suspension)	Arena Máquinas, Uberaba; Attendance: 200; Referees: Lah, Sok (SLO)

20 July 2015; 16:15	Argentina	18–28	South Korea	Arena Máquinas, Uberaba; Attendance: 200; Referees: Andorka, Hucker (HUN)
20 July 2015; 16:15	Dechamps, Bernachea 4	(9–12)	Lim Jae-seo 6	Arena Máquinas, Uberaba; Attendance: 200; Referees: Andorka, Hucker (HUN)
20 July 2015; 16:15	4× (yellow card) 7× (suspension)	Report	3× (yellow card) 6× (suspension)	Arena Máquinas, Uberaba; Attendance: 200; Referees: Andorka, Hucker (HUN)

22 July 2015; 16:15	Chile	22–38	France	Arena Máquinas, Uberaba; Attendance: 100; Referees: Andorka, Hucker (HUN)
22 July 2015; 16:15	Ayala, Flores 8	(9–20)	Cardinal 7	Arena Máquinas, Uberaba; Attendance: 100; Referees: Andorka, Hucker (HUN)
22 July 2015; 16:15	3× (yellow card) 5× (suspension)	Report	4× (yellow card) 4× (suspension) 1× (red card)	Arena Máquinas, Uberaba; Attendance: 100; Referees: Andorka, Hucker (HUN)

22 July 2015; 18:30	South Korea	27–28	Denmark	Arena Máquinas, Uberaba; Attendance: 350; Referees: Lah, Sok (SLO)
22 July 2015; 18:30	Kim Gi-min 8	(13–10)	Hald Jensen, Holst Jensen 5	Arena Máquinas, Uberaba; Attendance: 350; Referees: Lah, Sok (SLO)
22 July 2015; 18:30	3× (yellow card) 4× (suspension)	Report	3× (yellow card) 7× (suspension)	Arena Máquinas, Uberaba; Attendance: 350; Referees: Lah, Sok (SLO)

22 July 2015; 20:45	Algeria	19–23	Argentina	Arena Máquinas, Uberaba; Attendance: 200; Referees: Volodkov, Zotin (RUS)
22 July 2015; 20:45	Djebrouni 7	(7–12)	Bernachea 7	Arena Máquinas, Uberaba; Attendance: 200; Referees: Volodkov, Zotin (RUS)
22 July 2015; 20:45	2× (yellow card) 7× (suspension) 1× (red card)	Report	2× (yellow card) 5× (suspension)	Arena Máquinas, Uberaba; Attendance: 200; Referees: Volodkov, Zotin (RUS)

23 July 2015; 14:00	Chile	22–35	South Korea	Arena Máquinas, Uberaba; Attendance: 150; Referees: Al-Mawt, Marhoon (BHR)
23 July 2015; 14:00	Salas 4	(8–18)	Kim Da-gyeom 6	Arena Máquinas, Uberaba; Attendance: 150; Referees: Al-Mawt, Marhoon (BHR)
23 July 2015; 14:00	3× (yellow card) 5× (suspension) 1× (red card)	Report	2× (yellow card) 2× (suspension)	Arena Máquinas, Uberaba; Attendance: 150; Referees: Al-Mawt, Marhoon (BHR)

23 July 2015; 16:15	France	28–19	Argentina	Arena Máquinas, Uberaba; Attendance: 600; Referees: Covalciuc, Covalciuc (MDA)
23 July 2015; 16:15	Seri 7	(9–7)	Mouriño 4	Arena Máquinas, Uberaba; Attendance: 600; Referees: Covalciuc, Covalciuc (MDA)
23 July 2015; 16:15	2× (yellow card) 7× (suspension)	Report	3× (yellow card) 2× (suspension)	Arena Máquinas, Uberaba; Attendance: 600; Referees: Covalciuc, Covalciuc (MDA)

23 July 2015; 20:45	Denmark	42–18	Algeria	Arena Máquinas, Uberaba; Attendance: 350; Referees: Mošorinski, Pandžić (SRB)
23 July 2015; 20:45	Holm 8	(17–9)	Khelil 5	Arena Máquinas, Uberaba; Attendance: 350; Referees: Mošorinski, Pandžić (SRB)
23 July 2015; 20:45	3× (yellow card) 2× (suspension)	Report	3× (yellow card) 1× (suspension)	Arena Máquinas, Uberaba; Attendance: 350; Referees: Mošorinski, Pandžić (SRB)

25 July 2015; 15:30	France	39–31	South Korea	Arena Máquinas, Uberaba; Referees: Mošorinski, Pandžić (SRB)
25 July 2015; 15:30	Delecroix 8	(20–14)	Oh Seung-gwon 8	Arena Máquinas, Uberaba; Referees: Mošorinski, Pandžić (SRB)
25 July 2015; 15:30	3× (yellow card) 9× (suspension)	Report	3× (yellow card) 3× (suspension)	Arena Máquinas, Uberaba; Referees: Mošorinski, Pandžić (SRB)

25 July 2015; 17:45	Argentina	24–30	Denmark	Arena Máquinas, Uberaba; Attendance: 300; Referees: Boualloucha, Khenissi (TUN)
25 July 2015; 17:45	Bernachea 7	(13–14)	Schilling 9	Arena Máquinas, Uberaba; Attendance: 300; Referees: Boualloucha, Khenissi (TUN)
25 July 2015; 17:45	3× (yellow card) 6× (suspension)	Report	3× (yellow card) 7× (suspension)	Arena Máquinas, Uberaba; Attendance: 300; Referees: Boualloucha, Khenissi (TUN)

25 July 2015; 20:00	Algeria	29–22	Chile	Arena Máquinas, Uberaba; Attendance: 100; Referees: Covalciuc, Covalciuc (MDA)
25 July 2015; 20:00	Djehiche 8	(16–10)	Ayala 6	Arena Máquinas, Uberaba; Attendance: 100; Referees: Covalciuc, Covalciuc (MDA)
25 July 2015; 20:00	3× (yellow card) 5× (suspension)	Report	4× (yellow card) 4× (suspension)	Arena Máquinas, Uberaba; Attendance: 100; Referees: Covalciuc, Covalciuc (MDA)

26 July 2015; 14:00	Denmark	26–32	France	Arena Máquinas, Uberaba; Attendance: 250; Referees: Volodkov, Zotin (RUS)
26 July 2015; 14:00	three players 4	(15–18)	Billant, Tournat 6	Arena Máquinas, Uberaba; Attendance: 250; Referees: Volodkov, Zotin (RUS)
26 July 2015; 14:00	3× (yellow card) 4× (suspension)	Report	3× (yellow card) 3× (suspension)	Arena Máquinas, Uberaba; Attendance: 250; Referees: Volodkov, Zotin (RUS)

26 July 2015; 16:15	South Korea	32–26	Algeria	Arena Máquinas, Uberaba; Referees: Jedermann, Posch (USA)
26 July 2015; 16:15	Park Soon-geun 6	(16–11)	Allouach, Khelil 5	Arena Máquinas, Uberaba; Referees: Jedermann, Posch (USA)
26 July 2015; 16:15	3× (yellow card) 1× (suspension)	Report	2× (yellow card) 7× (suspension) 1× (red card)	Arena Máquinas, Uberaba; Referees: Jedermann, Posch (USA)

26 July 2015; 20:45	Argentina	30–18	Chile	Arena Máquinas, Uberaba; Attendance: 400; Referees: Andorka, Hucker (HUN)
26 July 2015; 20:45	Werner 6	(13–8)	Flores 6	Arena Máquinas, Uberaba; Attendance: 400; Referees: Andorka, Hucker (HUN)
26 July 2015; 20:45	1× (yellow card) 6× (suspension)	Report	3× (yellow card) 7× (suspension)	Arena Máquinas, Uberaba; Attendance: 400; Referees: Andorka, Hucker (HUN)

=== Group D ===
Pos	Team	Pld	W	D	L	GF	GA	GD	Pts	Qualification
1	Germany	5	4	1	0	166	119	+47	9	Advanced to knockout stage
2	Egypt	5	3	1	1	151	128	+23	7 (Note: Brazil–Egypt 31–32)	Advanced to knockout stage
3	Brazil	5	3	1	1	155	131	+24	7	Advanced to knockout stage
4	Norway	5	2	0	3	135	138	−3	4	Advanced to knockout stage
5	Japan	5	1	1	3	139	155	−16	3	
6	Uruguay	5	0	0	5	89	164	−75	0	

Source: ihf.info
Rules for classification: 1) points; 2) head-to-head points; 3) head-to-head goal difference; 4) head-to-head number of goals scored; 5) Goal difference.
Notes:

19 July 2015; 18:30	Brazil	31–30	Japan	Arena Máquinas, Uberaba; Attendance: 6,000; Referees: Andorka, Hucker (HUN)
19 July 2015; 18:30	Langaro, Moreira 5	(14–15)	Tokuda 9	Arena Máquinas, Uberaba; Attendance: 6,000; Referees: Andorka, Hucker (HUN)
19 July 2015; 18:30	3× (yellow card) 6× (suspension) 1× (red card)	Report	3× (yellow card) 3× (suspension)	Arena Máquinas, Uberaba; Attendance: 6,000; Referees: Andorka, Hucker (HUN)

20 July 2015; 18:30	Germany	28–24	Norway	Arena Máquinas, Uberaba; Attendance: 500; Referees: Volodkov, Zotin (RUS)
20 July 2015; 18:30	four players 5	(14–12)	Pedersen 12	Arena Máquinas, Uberaba; Attendance: 500; Referees: Volodkov, Zotin (RUS)
20 July 2015; 18:30	3× (yellow card) 4× (suspension)	Report	3× (yellow card) 8× (suspension) 1× (red card)	Arena Máquinas, Uberaba; Attendance: 500; Referees: Volodkov, Zotin (RUS)

20 July 2015; 20:45	Egypt	37–20	Uruguay	Arena Máquinas, Uberaba; Attendance: 110; Referees: Al-Mawt, Marhoon (BHR)
20 July 2015; 20:45	Adel Yousry Saad 6	(18–7)	S. Ancheta 5	Arena Máquinas, Uberaba; Attendance: 110; Referees: Al-Mawt, Marhoon (BHR)
20 July 2015; 20:45	3× (yellow card) 2× (suspension)	Report	1× (yellow card) 5× (suspension)	Arena Máquinas, Uberaba; Attendance: 110; Referees: Al-Mawt, Marhoon (BHR)

21 July 2015; 16:15	Uruguay	18–37	Germany	Arena Máquinas, Uberaba; Attendance: 200; Referees: Jedermann, Posch (USA)
21 July 2015; 16:15	S. Ancheta 5	(9–17)	Kunkel 8	Arena Máquinas, Uberaba; Attendance: 200; Referees: Jedermann, Posch (USA)
21 July 2015; 16:15	3× (yellow card) 5× (suspension)	Report	2× (yellow card) 2× (suspension)	Arena Máquinas, Uberaba; Attendance: 200; Referees: Jedermann, Posch (USA)

21 July 2015; 18:30	Norway	24–37	Brazil	Arena Máquinas, Uberaba; Attendance: 4,000; Referees: Mošorinski, Pandžić (SRB)
21 July 2015; 18:30	Ekren, Pedersen 5	(13–17)	Hackbarth 9	Arena Máquinas, Uberaba; Attendance: 4,000; Referees: Mošorinski, Pandžić (SRB)
21 July 2015; 18:30	3× (yellow card) 9× (suspension)	Report	2× (yellow card) 4× (suspension)	Arena Máquinas, Uberaba; Attendance: 4,000; Referees: Mošorinski, Pandžić (SRB)

21 July 2015; 20:45	Japan	27–27	Egypt	Arena Máquinas, Uberaba; Attendance: 1,000; Referees: Covalciuc, Covalciuc (MDA)
21 July 2015; 20:45	Tokuda 10	(17–14)	Moustafa Khairi 5	Arena Máquinas, Uberaba; Attendance: 1,000; Referees: Covalciuc, Covalciuc (MDA)
21 July 2015; 20:45	3× (yellow card) 4× (suspension)	Report	3× (yellow card) 2× (suspension)	Arena Máquinas, Uberaba; Attendance: 1,000; Referees: Covalciuc, Covalciuc (MDA)

23 July 2015; 09:30	Germany	43–24	Japan	Arena Máquinas, Uberaba; Attendance: 100; Referees: Boualloucha, Khenissi (TUN)
23 July 2015; 09:30	Ritterbach 10	(20–11)	Tanaka 5	Arena Máquinas, Uberaba; Attendance: 100; Referees: Boualloucha, Khenissi (TUN)
23 July 2015; 09:30	3× (yellow card) 6× (suspension)	Report	3× (yellow card) 3× (suspension)	Arena Máquinas, Uberaba; Attendance: 100; Referees: Boualloucha, Khenissi (TUN)

23 July 2015; 11:45	Norway	31–16	Uruguay	Arena Máquinas, Uberaba; Attendance: 100; Referees: Lah, Sok (SLO)
23 July 2015; 11:45	Pedersen 7	(19–8)	S.Ancheta 6	Arena Máquinas, Uberaba; Attendance: 100; Referees: Lah, Sok (SLO)
23 July 2015; 11:45	3× (yellow card) 4× (suspension)	Report	3× (yellow card) 4× (suspension)	Arena Máquinas, Uberaba; Attendance: 100; Referees: Lah, Sok (SLO)

23 July 2015; 18:30	Brazil	31–32	Egypt	Arena Máquinas, Uberaba; Attendance: 4,000; Referees: Andorka, Hucker (HUN)
23 July 2015; 18:30	Rodrigues 9	(16–17)	El-Deraa 10	Arena Máquinas, Uberaba; Attendance: 4,000; Referees: Andorka, Hucker (HUN)
23 July 2015; 18:30	4× (yellow card) 2× (suspension)	Report	3× (yellow card) 4× (suspension)	Arena Máquinas, Uberaba; Attendance: 4,000; Referees: Andorka, Hucker (HUN)

24 July 2015; 18:30	Egypt	24–29	Germany	Arena Máquinas, Uberaba; Referees: Volodkov, Zotin (RUS)
24 July 2015; 18:30	El-Badraway, El-Deraa 5	(12–16)	Ernst 7	Arena Máquinas, Uberaba; Referees: Volodkov, Zotin (RUS)
24 July 2015; 18:30	3× (yellow card) 5× (suspension)	Report	3× (yellow card) 8× (suspension)	Arena Máquinas, Uberaba; Referees: Volodkov, Zotin (RUS)

24 July 2015; 18:30	Brazil	27–16	Uruguay	Ginásio Municipal Tancredo Neves, Uberlândia; Attendance: 2,500; Referees: Al-Mutawa, Al-Suwailem (KUW)
24 July 2015; 18:30	Santos 5	(13–5)	Chaparro 4	Ginásio Municipal Tancredo Neves, Uberlândia; Attendance: 2,500; Referees: Al-Mutawa, Al-Suwailem (KUW)
24 July 2015; 18:30	3× (yellow card) 1× (suspension)	Report	1× (yellow card) 6× (suspension)	Ginásio Municipal Tancredo Neves, Uberlândia; Attendance: 2,500; Referees: Al-Mutawa, Al-Suwailem (KUW)

24 July 2015; 20:45	Japan	26–35	Norway	Arena Máquinas, Uberaba; Attendance: 200; Referees: Jedermann, Posch (USA)
24 July 2015; 20:45	Tokuda 9	(12–22)	Pedersen 10	Arena Máquinas, Uberaba; Attendance: 200; Referees: Jedermann, Posch (USA)
24 July 2015; 20:45	4× (yellow card) 1× (suspension)	Report	3× (yellow card) 4× (suspension)	Arena Máquinas, Uberaba; Attendance: 200; Referees: Jedermann, Posch (USA)

26 July 2015; 09:30	Uruguay	19–32	Japan	Arena Máquinas, Uberaba; Attendance: 100; Referees: Mošorinski, Pandžić (SRB)
26 July 2015; 09:30	Chaparro 10	(10–17)	Tanaka 5	Arena Máquinas, Uberaba; Attendance: 100; Referees: Mošorinski, Pandžić (SRB)
26 July 2015; 09:30	4× (yellow card) 11× (suspension) 1× (red card)	Report	3× (yellow card) 7× (suspension)	Arena Máquinas, Uberaba; Attendance: 100; Referees: Mošorinski, Pandžić (SRB)

26 July 2015; 11:45	Egypt	31–21	Norway	Arena Máquinas, Uberaba; Attendance: 200; Referees: Al-Mawt, Marhoon (BHR)
26 July 2015; 11:45	El-Deraa 7	(15–12)	Johannessen 5	Arena Máquinas, Uberaba; Attendance: 200; Referees: Al-Mawt, Marhoon (BHR)
26 July 2015; 11:45	3× (yellow card) 5× (suspension)	Report	4× (yellow card) 4× (suspension)	Arena Máquinas, Uberaba; Attendance: 200; Referees: Al-Mawt, Marhoon (BHR)

26 July 2015; 18:30	Germany	29–29	Brazil	Arena Máquinas, Uberaba; Attendance: 5,800; Referees: Lah, Sok (SLO)
26 July 2015; 18:30	Ernst 8	(15–15)	Hackbarth 7	Arena Máquinas, Uberaba; Attendance: 5,800; Referees: Lah, Sok (SLO)
26 July 2015; 18:30	4× (yellow card) 4× (suspension)	Report	3× (yellow card) 5× (suspension)	Arena Máquinas, Uberaba; Attendance: 5,800; Referees: Lah, Sok (SLO)

== Knockout stage ==
Round of 16
28 July
Spain	31
Russia	25
28 July
Brazil	31
Denmark	34
28 July
Qatar	35
Belarus (ET)	36
28 July
Germany	27
Argentina	18
28 July
Sweden (ET)	33
Portugal	30
28 July
South Korea	36
Egypt	39
28 July
Tunisia	27
Romania	29
28 July
France	24
Norway	20

Quarterfinals
29 July
Spain	21
Denmark	22
29 July
Belarus	37
Germany	43
29 July
Sweden	27
Egypt	28
29 July
Romania	20
France	30

Semifinals
31 July
Denmark	28
Germany	26
31 July
Egypt	30
France	32

Final
1 August
Denmark	24
France	26
Third place
1 August
Germany (ET)	35
Egypt	34

5th place bracket

5th–8th place Semifinals
31 July
Spain	34
Belarus	36
31 July
Sweden	36
Romania	24

Fifth place
1 August
Belarus	33
Sweden	37
Seventh place
1 August
Spain	30
Romania	29

=== Round of 16 ===
28 July 2015; 13:30	Spain	31–25	Russia	Ginásio Municipal Tancredo Neves, Uberlândia; Attendance: 200; Referees: Brkić, Jusufhodžić (AUT)
28 July 2015; 13:30	Sánchez 8	(12–14)	Chernov, Shkurinskiy 6	Ginásio Municipal Tancredo Neves, Uberlândia; Attendance: 200; Referees: Brkić, Jusufhodžić (AUT)
28 July 2015; 13:30	2× (yellow card) 2× (suspension)	Report	3× (yellow card) 2× (suspension)	Ginásio Municipal Tancredo Neves, Uberlândia; Attendance: 200; Referees: Brkić, Jusufhodžić (AUT)

28 July 2015; 13:30	South Korea	36–39	Egypt	Arena Máquinas, Uberaba; Attendance: 100; Referees: Andorka, Hucker (HUN)
28 July 2015; 13:30	Lim Jae-seo 8	(17–15)	El-Deraa 11	Arena Máquinas, Uberaba; Attendance: 100; Referees: Andorka, Hucker (HUN)
28 July 2015; 13:30	2× (yellow card) 5× (suspension)	Report	3× (yellow card) 7× (suspension)	Arena Máquinas, Uberaba; Attendance: 100; Referees: Andorka, Hucker (HUN)

28 July 2015
15:45
Qatar
35–36 (ET)
Belarus
Ginásio Municipal Tancredo Neves, Uberlândia
Attendance: 800
Referees: Gasmi, Gasmi (FRA)
Denguir 17
(16–15)
Karalek 10
3× (yellow card) 4× (suspension)
Report
3× (yellow card) 2× (suspension)

FT: 31–31 ET: 4–5

28 July 2015
15:45
Sweden
33–30 (ET)
Portugal
Arena Máquinas, Uberaba
Attendance: 300
Referees: Boualloucha, Khenissi (TUN)
Nilsson, Zetterman 8
(17–13)
Alves 8
4× (yellow card) 7× (suspension)
Report
4× (yellow card) 3× (suspension)

FT: 28–28 ET: 5–2

28 July 2015; 18:00	Brazil	31–34	Denmark	Ginásio Municipal Tancredo Neves, Uberlândia; Attendance: 2,000; Referees: Kolahdouzan, Mousavian (IRN)
28 July 2015; 18:00	Silva 8	(16–19)	Jensen 7	Ginásio Municipal Tancredo Neves, Uberlândia; Attendance: 2,000; Referees: Kolahdouzan, Mousavian (IRN)
28 July 2015; 18:00	4× (yellow card) 1× (suspension)	Report	3× (yellow card) 7× (suspension)	Ginásio Municipal Tancredo Neves, Uberlândia; Attendance: 2,000; Referees: Kolahdouzan, Mousavian (IRN)

28 July 2015; 18:00	Tunisia	27–29	Romania	Arena Máquinas, Uberaba; Attendance: 100; Referees: Mošorinski, Pandžić (SRB)
28 July 2015; 18:00	Abdelli 9	(15–15)	Negru 14	Arena Máquinas, Uberaba; Attendance: 100; Referees: Mošorinski, Pandžić (SRB)
28 July 2015; 18:00	2× (yellow card) 5× (suspension)	Report	3× (yellow card) 5× (suspension)	Arena Máquinas, Uberaba; Attendance: 100; Referees: Mošorinski, Pandžić (SRB)

28 July 2015; 20:30	Germany	27–18	Argentina	Ginásio Municipal Tancredo Neves, Uberlândia; Attendance: 300; Referees: Pétursson, Sigurjónsson (ISL)
28 July 2015; 20:30	Kunkel 7	(12–8)	Mouriño 4	Ginásio Municipal Tancredo Neves, Uberlândia; Attendance: 300; Referees: Pétursson, Sigurjónsson (ISL)
28 July 2015; 20:30	2× (yellow card) 5× (suspension)	Report	2× (yellow card) 8× (suspension) 1× (red card)	Ginásio Municipal Tancredo Neves, Uberlândia; Attendance: 300; Referees: Pétursson, Sigurjónsson (ISL)

28 July 2015; 20:30	France	24–20	Norway	Arena Máquinas, Uberaba; Attendance: 250; Referees: Lah, Sok (SLO)
28 July 2015; 20:30	Tournat 6	(11–10)	Johannessen, Pedersen 7	Arena Máquinas, Uberaba; Attendance: 250; Referees: Lah, Sok (SLO)
28 July 2015; 20:30	2× (yellow card) 3× (suspension)	Report	4× (yellow card) 4× (suspension)	Arena Máquinas, Uberaba; Attendance: 250; Referees: Lah, Sok (SLO)

=== Quarterfinals ===
29 July 2015; 18:00	Spain	21–22	Denmark	Ginásio Municipal Tancredo Neves, Uberlândia; Attendance: 200; Referees: Erdoğan, Özdeniz (TUR)
29 July 2015; 18:00	three players 4	(12–10)	Hansen, Henneberg 4	Ginásio Municipal Tancredo Neves, Uberlândia; Attendance: 200; Referees: Erdoğan, Özdeniz (TUR)
29 July 2015; 18:00	3× (yellow card) 1× (suspension)	Report	3× (yellow card) 2× (suspension)	Ginásio Municipal Tancredo Neves, Uberlândia; Attendance: 200; Referees: Erdoğan, Özdeniz (TUR)

29 July 2015; 18:00	Egypt	28–27	Sweden	Arena Máquinas, Uberaba; Attendance: 200; Referees: Mošorinski, Pandžić (SRB)
29 July 2015; 18:00	three players 5	(15–15)	Mörk 9	Arena Máquinas, Uberaba; Attendance: 200; Referees: Mošorinski, Pandžić (SRB)
29 July 2015; 18:00	4× (yellow card)	Report	4× (yellow card) 7× (suspension)	Arena Máquinas, Uberaba; Attendance: 200; Referees: Mošorinski, Pandžić (SRB)

29 July 2015; 20:00	Belarus	37–43	Germany	Ginásio Municipal Tancredo Neves, Uberlândia; Attendance: 200; Referees: Alves, Magalhães (BRA)
29 July 2015; 20:00	Karalek 9	(17–19)	Preuss 17	Ginásio Municipal Tancredo Neves, Uberlândia; Attendance: 200; Referees: Alves, Magalhães (BRA)
29 July 2015; 20:00	3× (yellow card) 3× (suspension)	Report	3× (yellow card) 3× (suspension)	Ginásio Municipal Tancredo Neves, Uberlândia; Attendance: 200; Referees: Alves, Magalhães (BRA)

29 July 2015; 20:30	Romania	20–30	France	Arena Máquinas, Uberaba; Attendance: 200; Referees: Lah, Sok (SLO)
29 July 2015; 20:30	Rotaru 5	(8–17)	Delecroix 10	Arena Máquinas, Uberaba; Attendance: 200; Referees: Lah, Sok (SLO)
29 July 2015; 20:30	4× (yellow card) 5× (suspension)	Report	3× (yellow card) 9× (suspension) 1× (red card)	Arena Máquinas, Uberaba; Attendance: 200; Referees: Lah, Sok (SLO)

=== 5th–8th place semifinals ===
31 July 2015; 11:00	Spain	34–36	Belarus	Ginásio Municipal Tancredo Neves, Uberlândia; Attendance: 200; Referees: Andorka, Hucker (HUN)
31 July 2015; 11:00	Pérez 9	(18–19)	Harbuz 8	Ginásio Municipal Tancredo Neves, Uberlândia; Attendance: 200; Referees: Andorka, Hucker (HUN)
31 July 2015; 11:00	3× (yellow card) 1× (red card)	Report	4× (yellow card) 10× (suspension) 2× (red card)	Ginásio Municipal Tancredo Neves, Uberlândia; Attendance: 200; Referees: Andorka, Hucker (HUN)

31 July 2015; 13:15	Sweden	36–24	Romania	Ginásio Municipal Tancredo Neves, Uberlândia; Attendance: 100; Referees: Gasmi, Gasmi (FRA)
31 July 2015; 13:15	Nilsson, Zetterman 6	(18–15)	Militaru, Negru 6	Ginásio Municipal Tancredo Neves, Uberlândia; Attendance: 100; Referees: Gasmi, Gasmi (FRA)
31 July 2015; 13:15	3× (yellow card) 5× (suspension)	Report	3× (yellow card) 3× (suspension)	Ginásio Municipal Tancredo Neves, Uberlândia; Attendance: 100; Referees: Gasmi, Gasmi (FRA)

=== Semifinals ===
31 July 2015; 15:30	Denmark	28–26	Germany	Ginásio Municipal Tancredo Neves, Uberlândia; Attendance: 400; Referees: Brkic, Jusufhodzic (AUT)
31 July 2015; 15:30	Hansen 6	(15–13)	Ritterbach 7	Ginásio Municipal Tancredo Neves, Uberlândia; Attendance: 400; Referees: Brkic, Jusufhodzic (AUT)
31 July 2015; 15:30	3× (yellow card) 4× (suspension)	Report	4× (yellow card) 4× (suspension)	Ginásio Municipal Tancredo Neves, Uberlândia; Attendance: 400; Referees: Brkic, Jusufhodzic (AUT)

31 July 2015; 18:00	Egypt	30–32	France	Ginásio Municipal Tancredo Neves, Uberlândia; Attendance: 1,000; Referees: Kolahdouzan, Mousavian (IRN)
31 July 2015; 18:00	El-Deraa 8	(12–15)	Tournat 7	Ginásio Municipal Tancredo Neves, Uberlândia; Attendance: 1,000; Referees: Kolahdouzan, Mousavian (IRN)
31 July 2015; 18:00	4× (yellow card) 5× (suspension)	Report	3× (yellow card) 5× (suspension)	Ginásio Municipal Tancredo Neves, Uberlândia; Attendance: 1,000; Referees: Kolahdouzan, Mousavian (IRN)

=== Seventh place game ===
1 August 2015; 11:00	Spain	30–29	Romania	Ginásio Municipal Tancredo Neves, Uberlândia; Attendance: 200; Referees: Boualloucha, Khenissi (TUN)
1 August 2015; 11:00	Arino 5	(14–13)	Racoțea 10	Ginásio Municipal Tancredo Neves, Uberlândia; Attendance: 200; Referees: Boualloucha, Khenissi (TUN)
1 August 2015; 11:00	3× (yellow card) 4× (suspension)	Report	4× (yellow card) 4× (suspension)	Ginásio Municipal Tancredo Neves, Uberlândia; Attendance: 200; Referees: Boualloucha, Khenissi (TUN)

=== Fifth place game ===
1 August 2015; 13:15	Belarus	33–37	Sweden	Ginásio Municipal Tancredo Neves, Uberlândia; Attendance: 200; Referees: Erdoğan, Özdeniz (TUR)
1 August 2015; 13:15	Shynkel 7	(15–19)	Zetterman 12	Ginásio Municipal Tancredo Neves, Uberlândia; Attendance: 200; Referees: Erdoğan, Özdeniz (TUR)
1 August 2015; 13:15	2× (yellow card) 2× (suspension)	Report	3× (yellow card) 5× (suspension)	Ginásio Municipal Tancredo Neves, Uberlândia; Attendance: 200; Referees: Erdoğan, Özdeniz (TUR)

=== Third place game ===
1 August 2015
15:30
Germany
35–34 (ET)
Egypt
Ginásio Municipal Tancredo Neves, Uberlândia
Attendance: 1,000
Referees: Alves, Magalhães (BRA)
Ritterbach 8
(12–13)
El-Deraa 7
4× (yellow card) 8× (suspension) 1× (red card)
Report
4× (yellow card) 9× (suspension) 1× (red card)

FT: 26–26 ET: 3–3, 6–5

=== Final ===
1 August 2015; 18:00	Denmark	24–26	France	Ginásio Municipal Tancredo Neves, Uberlândia; Attendance: 3,000; Referees: Lah, Sok (SLO)
1 August 2015; 18:00	Lassen 8	(11–14)	Delecroix 8	Ginásio Municipal Tancredo Neves, Uberlândia; Attendance: 3,000; Referees: Lah, Sok (SLO)
1 August 2015; 18:00	3× (yellow card) 4× (suspension)	Report	3× (yellow card) 2× (suspension)	Ginásio Municipal Tancredo Neves, Uberlândia; Attendance: 3,000; Referees: Lah, Sok (SLO)

== 9–16th placement games ==
The eight losers of the round of 16 were seeded according to their results in the preliminary round against teams ranked 1–4.

=== Ranking ===
Pos	Team	Pld	W	D	L	GF	GA	GD	Pts
1	Qatar	3	2	0	1	84	78	+6	4
2	Brazil	3	1	1	1	97	85	+12	3
3	South Korea	3	1	0	2	86	85	+1	2
4	Tunisia	3	1	0	2	81	94	−13	2
5	Portugal	3	0	1	2	66	77	−11	1
6	Argentina	3	0	0	3	61	86	−25	0
7	Norway	3	0	0	3	69	96	−27	0
8	Russia	3	0	0	3	84	113	−29	0

Rules for classification: 1) points; 2) head-to-head points; 3) head-to-head goal difference; 4) head-to-head number of goals scored; 5) Goal difference.

=== 15th place game ===
29 July 2015; 13:30	Norway	32–29	Russia	Arena Máquinas, Uberaba; Attendance: 80; Referees: Jedermann, Posch (USA)
29 July 2015; 13:30	Johannessen 9	(18–13)	Shkurinskiy 10	Arena Máquinas, Uberaba; Attendance: 80; Referees: Jedermann, Posch (USA)
29 July 2015; 13:30	3× (yellow card) 4× (suspension)	Report	3× (yellow card) 2× (suspension)	Arena Máquinas, Uberaba; Attendance: 80; Referees: Jedermann, Posch (USA)

=== 13th place game ===
29 July 2015; 13:30	Portugal	26–30	Argentina	Ginásio Municipal Tancredo Neves, Uberlândia; Attendance: 200; Referees: Al-Mutawa, Al-Suwailem (KUW)
29 July 2015; 13:30	M. Martins 10	(11–13)	Grandi 8	Ginásio Municipal Tancredo Neves, Uberlândia; Attendance: 200; Referees: Al-Mutawa, Al-Suwailem (KUW)
29 July 2015; 13:30	3× (yellow card) 2× (suspension)	Report	3× (yellow card) 4× (suspension) 1× (red card)	Ginásio Municipal Tancredo Neves, Uberlândia; Attendance: 200; Referees: Al-Mutawa, Al-Suwailem (KUW)

=== Eleventh place game ===
29 July 2015; 15:45	South Korea	29–26	Tunisia	Arena Máquinas, Uberaba; Attendance: 100; Referees: Al-Mawt, Marhoon (BHR)
29 July 2015; 15:45	Lim Jae-seo 8	(17–12)	Abdelli 7	Arena Máquinas, Uberaba; Attendance: 100; Referees: Al-Mawt, Marhoon (BHR)
29 July 2015; 15:45	3× (yellow card) 6× (suspension)	Report	4× (yellow card) 5× (suspension)	Arena Máquinas, Uberaba; Attendance: 100; Referees: Al-Mawt, Marhoon (BHR)

=== Ninth place game ===
29 July 2015
15:45
Qatar
36–35
Brazil
Ginásio Municipal Tancredo Neves, Uberlândia
Attendance: 200
Referees: Brkić, Jusufhodžić (AUT)
Abdalla 6
(17–17)
Hackbarth 11
4× (yellow card) 5× (suspension) 2× (red card)
Report
3× (yellow card) 6× (suspension)

FT: 32–32 Pen: 4–3

== President's Cup ==
17th place bracket

17th–20th place Semifinals
28 July
Netherlands	23
Serbia	37
28 July
Algeria	19
Japan	28

17th place
29 July
Serbia	28
Japan	24
19th place
29 July
Netherlands	33
Algeria	25

21st place bracket

21st–24th place Semifinals
28 July
Paraguay	22
Angola	33
28 July
Chile	18
Uruguay	21

21st place
29 July
Angola	24
Uruguay	16
23rd place
29 July
Paraguay	27
Chile	37

=== 21st–24th place semifinals ===
28 July 2015; 09:00	Chile	18–21	Uruguay	Arena Máquinas, Uberaba; Attendance: 50; Referees: Jedermann, Posch (USA)
28 July 2015; 09:00	Flores 4	(7–12)	Méndez 5	Arena Máquinas, Uberaba; Attendance: 50; Referees: Jedermann, Posch (USA)
28 July 2015; 09:00	3× (yellow card) 3× (suspension)	Report	3× (yellow card) 6× (suspension)	Arena Máquinas, Uberaba; Attendance: 50; Referees: Jedermann, Posch (USA)

28 July 2015; 11:15	Paraguay	22–33	Angola	Arena Máquinas, Uberaba; Attendance: 50; Referees: Covalciuc, Covalciuc (MDA)
28 July 2015; 11:15	Salinas 8	(8–12)	Cristóvão 8	Arena Máquinas, Uberaba; Attendance: 50; Referees: Covalciuc, Covalciuc (MDA)
28 July 2015; 11:15	3× (yellow card) 2× (suspension)	Report	4× (yellow card) 3× (suspension)	Arena Máquinas, Uberaba; Attendance: 50; Referees: Covalciuc, Covalciuc (MDA)

=== 17th–20th place semifinals ===
28 July 2015; 09:00	Algeria	19–28	Japan	Ginásio Municipal Tancredo Neves, Uberlândia; Attendance: 200; Referees: Gonzales, Prieto (URU)
28 July 2015; 09:00	Khelil 7	(9–12)	Tanaka 8	Ginásio Municipal Tancredo Neves, Uberlândia; Attendance: 200; Referees: Gonzales, Prieto (URU)
28 July 2015; 09:00	2× (yellow card) 2× (suspension)	Report	2× (yellow card)	Ginásio Municipal Tancredo Neves, Uberlândia; Attendance: 200; Referees: Gonzales, Prieto (URU)

28 July 2015; 11:15	Netherlands	23–37	Serbia	Ginásio Municipal Tancredo Neves, Uberlândia; Attendance: 200; Referees: Erdoğan, Özdeniz (TUR)
28 July 2015; 11:15	Jansen 5	(10–18)	Kurtes 7	Ginásio Municipal Tancredo Neves, Uberlândia; Attendance: 200; Referees: Erdoğan, Özdeniz (TUR)
28 July 2015; 11:15	3× (yellow card) 1× (suspension)	Report	3× (yellow card) 5× (suspension)	Ginásio Municipal Tancredo Neves, Uberlândia; Attendance: 200; Referees: Erdoğan, Özdeniz (TUR)

=== 23rd place game ===
29 July 2015; 09:00	Paraguay	27–37	Chile	Arena Máquinas, Uberaba; Attendance: 15; Referees: Andorka, Hucker (HUN)
29 July 2015; 09:00	Salinas 11	(13–19)	Ayala 8	Arena Máquinas, Uberaba; Attendance: 15; Referees: Andorka, Hucker (HUN)
29 July 2015; 09:00	3× (yellow card) 6× (suspension)	Report		Arena Máquinas, Uberaba; Attendance: 15; Referees: Andorka, Hucker (HUN)

=== 21st place game ===
29 July 2015; 11:15	Angola	24–16	Uruguay	Arena Máquinas, Uberaba; Attendance: 15; Referees: Covalciuc, Covalciuc (MDA)
29 July 2015; 11:15	Pedro 6	(11–8)	Méndez 5	Arena Máquinas, Uberaba; Attendance: 15; Referees: Covalciuc, Covalciuc (MDA)
29 July 2015; 11:15	3× (yellow card) 5× (suspension)	Report	2× (yellow card) 1× (suspension)	Arena Máquinas, Uberaba; Attendance: 15; Referees: Covalciuc, Covalciuc (MDA)

=== 19th place game ===
29 July 2015; 09:00	Algeria	25–33	Netherlands	Ginásio Municipal Tancredo Neves, Uberlândia; Attendance: 200; Referees: Kolahdouzan, Mousavian (IRN)
29 July 2015; 09:00	Djebrouni 5	(14–17)	Smits 9	Ginásio Municipal Tancredo Neves, Uberlândia; Attendance: 200; Referees: Kolahdouzan, Mousavian (IRN)
29 July 2015; 09:00	4× (yellow card) 3× (suspension)	Report	2× (yellow card) 3× (suspension)	Ginásio Municipal Tancredo Neves, Uberlândia; Attendance: 200; Referees: Kolahdouzan, Mousavian (IRN)

=== 17th place game ===
29 July 2015; 11:15	Japan	24–28	Serbia	Ginásio Municipal Tancredo Neves, Uberlândia; Attendance: 200; Referees: Pétursson, Sigurjónsson (ISL)
29 July 2015; 11:15	Tokuda 10	(14–14)	Kurtes 9	Ginásio Municipal Tancredo Neves, Uberlândia; Attendance: 200; Referees: Pétursson, Sigurjónsson (ISL)
29 July 2015; 11:15	3× (yellow card) 1× (suspension)	Report	3× (yellow card) 7× (suspension)	Ginásio Municipal Tancredo Neves, Uberlândia; Attendance: 200; Referees: Pétursson, Sigurjónsson (ISL)

== Final standings ==
Rank	Team
Gold medal	France
Silver medal	Denmark
Bronze medal	Germany
4	Egypt
5	Sweden
6	Belarus
7	Spain
8	Romania
9	Qatar
10	Brazil
11	South Korea
12	Tunisia
13	Argentina
14	Portugal
15	Norway
16	Russia
17	Serbia
18	Japan
19	Netherlands
20	Algeria
21	Angola
22	Uruguay
23	Chile
24	Paraguay

== Awards ==
=== MVP ===
- Right-back: Florian Delecroix (FRA)

=== All-star team ===
- Goalkeeper: Julien Meyer (FRA)
- Right wing: Jóhan Hansen (DEN)
- Right back: Florian Delecroix (FRA)
- Centre back: Mohab Hossam (EGY)
- Left back: Simon Ernst (GER)
- Left wing: Jerry Tollbring (SWE)
- Pivot: Simon Hald Jensen (DEN)
