= Handball at the 2023 Pan American Games – Men's team rosters =

== Brazil ==
The squad chosen for the 2023 Pan American Games in Santiago, Chile.

Head coach: Marcus de Oliveira

| No. | Pos. | Name | Date of birth (age) | Height | App. | Goals | Club |
|---|---|---|---|---|---|---|---|
| | | João Pedro Silva | | | | | (Romania) CSM București |
| | | Leonardo Abrahão | | | | | (Portugal) ABC Braga |
| | | José de Toledo | | | | | (Spain) Recoletas Atletico Valladolid |
| | | Rogério Moraes | | | | | (Germany) MT Melsungen |
| | | Thiagus Petrus dos Santos | | | | | (Spain) FC Barcelona Handbol |
| | | Rangel da Rosa | | | | | (France) Saint-Raphaël Var Handball |
| | | Matheus da Silva | | | | | (Spain) CD Bidasoa Irun |
| | | Leonardo Dutra | | | | | (Saudi Arabia) Al-Ahli Saudi FC |
| | | Haniel Langaro | | | | | (Spain) FC Barcelona Handbol |
| | | Leonardo Terçariol | | | | | (Spain) Bada Huesca |
| | | Rudolph Hackbarth | | | | | (Spain) REBI Balonmano Cuenca |
| | | Hugo Monte | | | | | (Brazil) EC Pinheiros |
| | | Gustavo Rodrigues | | | | | (France) Chambéry Savoie Mont-Blanc Handball |
| | | Jean Pierre Dupoux | | | | | Tremblay-en-France Handball |

== Chile ==
The squad chosen for the 2023 Pan American Games in Santiago, Chile.<

Head coach: Aitor Etxaburu

| No. | Pos. | Name | Date of birth (age) | Height | App. | Goals | Club |
|---|---|---|---|---|---|---|---|
| | | Sebastian Ceballos | | | | | (Spain) Balonmano Burgos |
| | | Emil Feuchtmann | | | | | (Spain) CBM Eon Horneo Alicante |
| | | Erwin Feuchtmann | | | | | (France) Fenix Toulouse Handball |
| | | Esteban Salinas | | | | | (Spain) CD Bidasoa Irun |
| | | Felipe Garcia | | | | | (Spain) Balonmano Burgos |
| | | Benjamin Illesca | | | | | (Spain) Agustinos Alicante |
| | | Vicente González | | | | | (Spain) BM Soria |
| | | Rodrigo Salinas | | | | | (Spain) CD Bidasoa Irun |
| | | Matias Paya | | | | | (Spain) CB Ciudad de Málaga |
| | | Daniel Ayala | | | | | (Chile) Balonmano USAB |
| | | Danilo Salgado | | | | | (Chile) DPV Kutral |
| | | Cristian Moll | | | | | (Spain) Eón Alicante |
| | | Aaron Codina | | | | | (Italy) Polisportiva Cingoli |
| | | Francisco Ahumada | | | | | (Spain) Viveros Herol BM Nava |

== Cuba ==
The squad chosen for the 2023 Pan American Games in Santiago, Chile.<

Head coach:

| No. | Pos. | Name | Date of birth (age) | Height | App. | Goals | Club |
|---|---|---|---|---|---|---|---|
| | | Ronaldo Almeida | | | | | (France) US Ivry Handball |
| | | Omar Toledano | | | | | Santiago de Cuba |
| | | Frank Cordies | | | | | (Spain) Bada Huesca |
| | | Hanser Rodriguez | | | | | (North Macedonia) RK Vardar 1961 |
| | | Adán Martinez | | | | | (Croatia) MRK Čakovec |
| | | Maiko Vazquez | | | | | (Cuba) Matanzas |
| | | Jorge Pren | | | | | (Cuba) Matanzas |
| | | Magnol Suárez | | | | | (Spain) Villa de Aranda |
| | | Adonys Garcia | | | | | (Portugal) AD Sanjoanense |
| | | Mario Perez | | | | | (Cuba) Pinar del Rio |
| | | Mario Sainz | | | | | (Spain) Balonmano Bolaños |
| | | Dariel Garcia | | | | | (Spain) CD Bidasoa Irun |
| | | Yosdany Rios | | | | | (United Arab Emirates) Al Jazira Club |
| | | Lidier Vergara | | | | | (Russia) Donskie Kazaki SFU |

== United States ==
The squad chosen for the 2023 Pan American Games in Santiago, Chile.

Head coach:

| No. | Pos. | Name | Date of birth (age) | Height | App. | Goals | Club |
|---|---|---|---|---|---|---|---|
| | | Benjamin Edwards | | | | | (Hungary) BFKA Veszprém |
| | | Pál Merkovszky | | | | | (Hungary) Budai Farkasok KKUK |
| | | Sean Corning | | | | | (Spain) CB Málaga |
| | | Maksim Mccaulay | | | | | (Sweden) IFK Kristianstad |
| | | Amar Amitovic | | | | | (Bosnia and Herzegovina) RK Krivaja Zavidovići |
| | | Jonas Strömberg | | | | | (Sweden) Lugi HF |
| | | Gary Hines | | | | | (Germany) HSV Solingen-Gräfrath |
| | | Aboubakar Fofana | | | | | (France) Valence Handball |
| | | Ian Hueter | | | | | (Germany) TSV Bayer Dormagen |
| | | Carl Otterström | | | | | (Sweden) Tyresö Handboll |
| | | Andrew Donlin | | | | | (United States) San Francisco CalHeat |
| | | Samuel Hoddersen | | | | | (Germany) HSG Rodgau Nieder-Roden |
| | | Domagoj Srsen | | | | | (Croatia) RK Metković |
| | | Maximillian Binderis | | | | | (Sweden) AIK Handboll |

== Uruguay ==
The squad chosen for the 2023 Pan American Games in Santiago, Chile.

Head coach:

| No. | Pos. | Name | Date of birth (age) | Height | App. | Goals | Club |
|---|---|---|---|---|---|---|---|
| | | Luis Felipe Navarrete | | | | | (Uruguay) Colegio Alemán |
| | | Gabriel Chaparro | | | | | (Spain) Frigorificos del Morrazo |
| | | Facundo Lima | | | | | (Uruguay) Pontevedrés Balonmano |
| | | Facundo Liston | | | | | (Uruguay) Scuola Italiana di Montevideo |
| | | Francisco Ancheta | | | | | (Uruguay) Club Malvín |
| | | Andrés Viera | | | | | (Uruguay) Scuola Italiana di Montevideo |
| | | Maximo Cancio | | | | | (Spain) Balonmano Vetusta |
| | | Rodrigo Botejara | | | | | (Uruguay) Scuola Italiana di Montevideo |
| | | Diego Falabrino | | | | | (Uruguay) Pontevedrés Balonmano |
| | | Bruno Borba | | | | | (Uruguay) Pontevedrés Balonmano |
| | | Maximiliano De Agrela | | | | | (Uruguay) Club Malvín |
| | | Federico Rubbo | | | | | (Uruguay) Scuola Italiana di Montevideo |
| | | Christian Rostagno | | | | | (Spain) Sant Esteve Sesrovires |
| | | Matías Etcheverry | | | | | (Uruguay) Colegio Alemán |
