= Rogério Moraes Ferreira =

Brazilian handball player (born 1994)

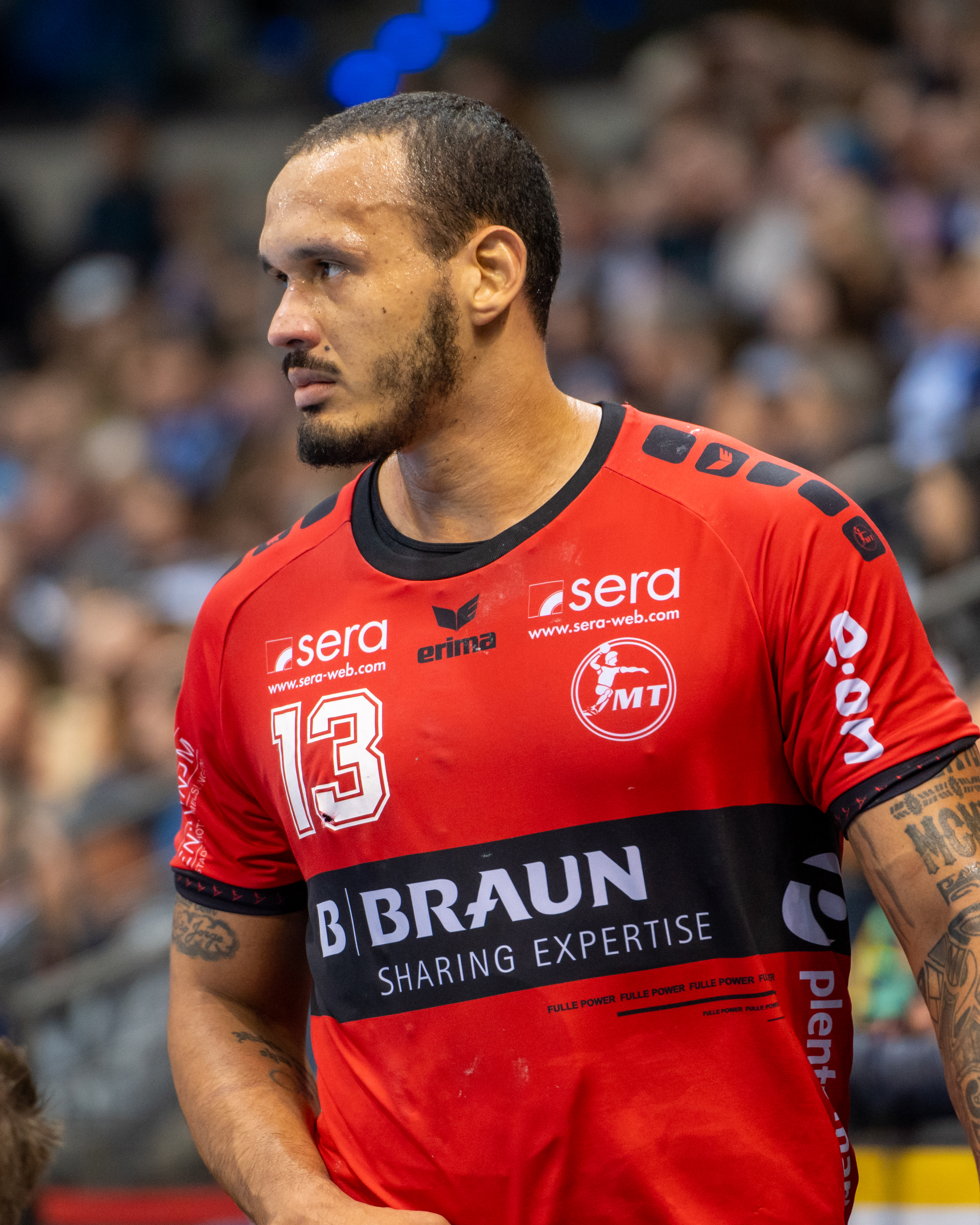
- Ferreira in 2024

Personal information
- Born: 11 January 1994 (age 32) Abaetetuba, Brazil
- Height: 2.04 m (6 ft 8 in)

Sport
- Sport: Handball
- Position: Pivot
- Current club: MT Melsungen
- Number: 13

Senior clubs
- Years: Team
- –: ADENA Abaetetuba
- –: Vila Olimpica
- 2015–2016: THW Kiel
- 2015–2016: TSV Altenholz
- 2016–2019: RK Vardar
- 2019–2021: Telekom Veszprém
- 2021–2022: S.L. Benfica
- 2022–2025: MT Melsungen
- 2025–: Montpellier Handball
National team
Years	Team	Apps	(Gls)
–	Brazil	30	(70)
Medal record
Pan American Games
Silver medal – second place	2023 Santiago	Team
Bronze medal – third place	2019 Lima	Team
Pan American Championship
Silver medal – second place	2018 Greenland
South and Central American Championship
Gold medal – first place	2022 Brazil
Silver medal – second place	2020 Brazil
South American Games
Gold medal – first place	2018 Cochabamba	Team
Pan American Junior Championship
Gold medal – first place	2015 Brazil

Rogério Moraes Ferreira (born 11 January 1994) is a Brazilian handball player who plays for MT Melsungen and the Brazilian national team.

== Honours ==
Vardar

- EHF Champions League: 2016-17, 2018-19

Benfica

- EHF European League: 2021–22

Individual

- 2022 South and Central American Men's Handball Championship: Best pivot
