= Gastón Mouriño =

Argentine handball player

Personal information
- Full name: Gaston Alberto Mouriño
- Born: 12 October 1994 (age 32) Buenos Aires, Argentina
- Height: 1.92 m (6 ft 4 in)

Sport
- Sport: Handball
- Position: Pivot
- Current club: CSM Constanta
- Number: 22
National team
Years	Team	Apps	(Gls)
–	Argentina	21	(28)
Medal record
Pan American Championship
Gold medal – first place	2018 Greenland
South and Central American Championship
Gold medal – first place	2020 Brazil
Silver medal – second place	2022 Brazil
Silver medal – second place	2024 Argentina
South American Games
Silver medal – second place	2018 Cochabamba	Team
Pan American Junior Championship
Silver medal – second place	2015 Brazil

Gaston Alberto Mouriño (born 12 October 1994) is an Argentine handball player for CSM Constanta and the Argentine national team. He represented Argentina at the 2019 World Men's Handball Championship and 2021 World Men's Handball Championship.
