= 2011 Pan American Men's Junior Handball Championship =

Tournament details
- Host country: Brazil
- Venue(s): 1 (in 1 host city)
- Dates: April 17–21
- Teams: 5

Final positions
- Champions: Argentina
- Runner-up: Brazil
- Third place: Canada
- Fourth place: Chile

Tournament statistics
- Matches played: 10
- Goals scored: 529 (52.9 per match)

The 2011 Pan American Men's Junior Handball Championship took place in Brasília from April 17 – April 21. It acts as the American qualifying tournament for the 2011 Men's Junior World Handball Championship.

== Results ==
Team	Pld	W	D	L	GF	GA	GD	Pts
Argentina	4	4	0	0	132	70	+62	8
Brazil	4	3	0	1	130	83	+47	6
Canada	4	2	0	2	95	134	-39	4
Chile	4	1	0	3	100	112	–12	2
Uruguay	4	0	0	4	72	130	–58	0

April 17; 11:00	Brazil	35 – 16	Uruguay	Brasília
April 17; 11:00		(18–11)		Brasília

April 17; 17:00	Canada	31 – 29	Chile	Brasília
April 17; 17:00		(14–14)		Brasília

April 18; 15:00	Argentina	33 – 15	Uruguay	Brasília
April 18; 15:00		(13–9)		Brasília

April 18; 17:00	Brazil	44 – 22	Canada	Brasília
April 18; 17:00		(21–12)		Brasília

April 19; 15:00	Argentina	43 – 13	Canada	Brasília
April 19; 15:00		(20–13)		Brasília

April 19; 17:00	Brazil	27 – 20	Chile	Brasília
April 19; 17:00		(12–8)		Brasília

April 20; 15:00	Chile	18 – 31	Argentina	Brasília
April 20; 15:00		(7–15)		Brasília

April 20; 17:00	Uruguay	18 – 29	Canada	Brasília
April 20; 17:00		(6–14)		Brasília

April 21; 09:00	Uruguay	23 – 33	Chile	Brasília
April 21; 09:00		(11–18)		Brasília

April 21; 11:00	Brazil	24 – 25	Argentina	Brasília
April 21; 11:00		(12–10)		Brasília

== Final standing ==
Rank	Team
Gold medal	Argentina
Silver medal	Brazil
Bronze medal	Canada
4	Chile
5	Uruguay

Team advanced to the 2011 Men's Junior World Handball Championship
