= Andrei Nicușor Negru =

Romanian handball player (born 1994)

Nicușor Andrei Negru
Personal information
- Full name: Nicușor Andrei Negru
- Nationality: Romanian
- Born: 24 May 1994 (age 32) Reșița, Romania
- Height: 1.83 m (6 ft 0 in)

Sport
- Sport: Handball
- Position: Left wing
- Current club: Dinamo București
- Number: 24

Senior clubs
- Years: Team
- –2014: HC Caraș-Severin
- 2014–2018: CSM București
- 2018–: Dinamo București
National team
- Years: Team
- 2016–: Romania

Andrei Nicușor Negru (born 24 May 1994) is a Romanian handballer who plays for Dinamo București and the Romania national team.

== Achievements ==
- Liga Națională:
  - Gold Medalist: 2019, 2020, 2021, 2022, 2023, 2024, 2025
  - Silver Medalist: 2015, 2016, 2017
- Cupa României:
  - Winner: 2016

== Individual awards ==
- IHF Youth World Championship Top Scorer: 2013
- IHF Junior World Championship Top Scorer: 2015
- Prosport All-Star Left Wing of the Romanian Liga Națională: 2017
