= Simon Ernst =

German handball player (born 1994)

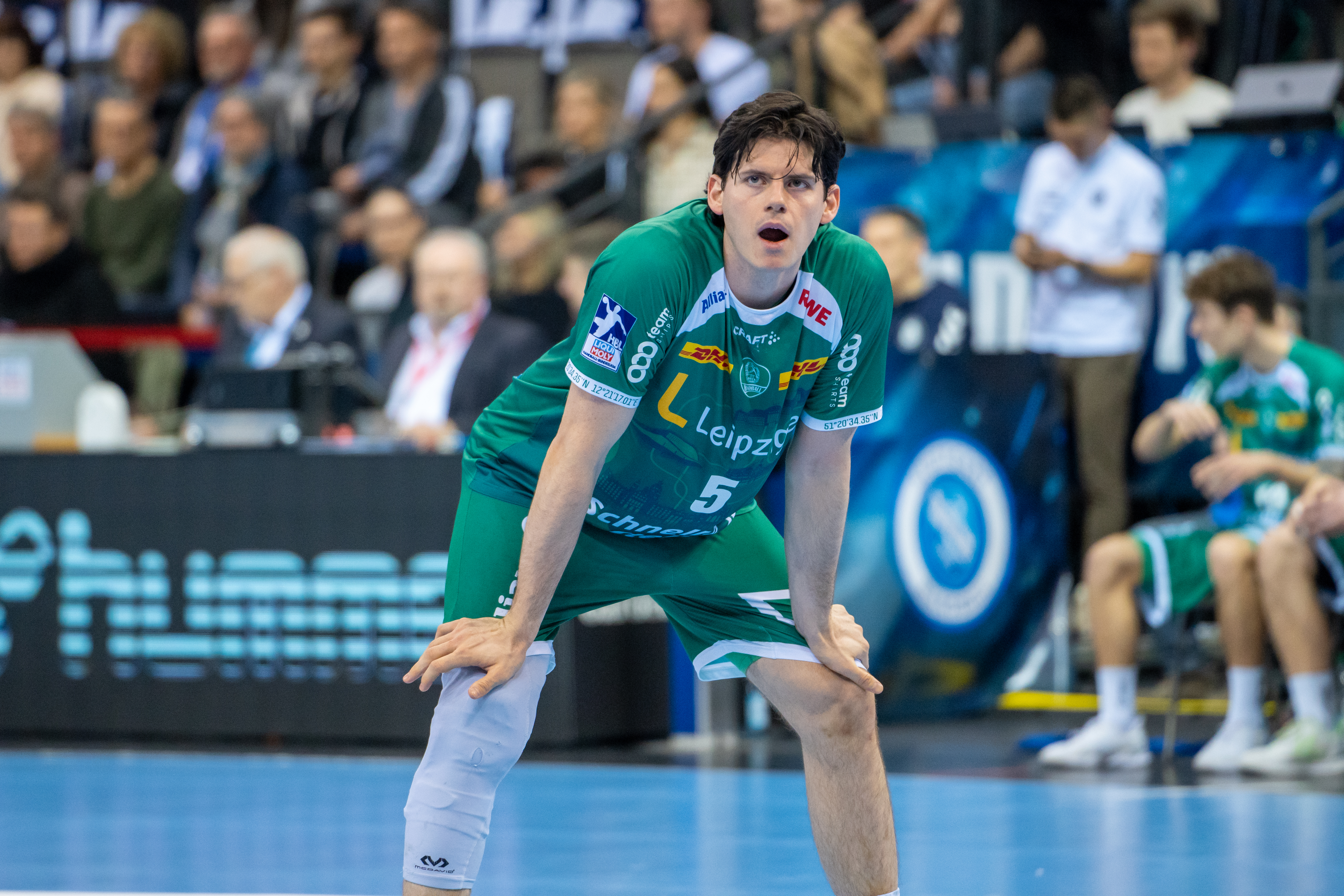

Personal information
- Nationality: German
- Born: 2 April 1994 (age 32) Düren, Germany
- Height: 1.95 m (6 ft 5 in)

Sport
- Sport: Handball
- Position: Centre back
- Current club: SC DHfK Leipzig Handball
- Number: 5

Youth career
- Years: Team
- 1998-2009: Birkesdorfer TV
- 2009-2012: TSV Bayer Dormagen

Senior clubs
- Years: Team
- 2012–2014: TSV Bayer Dormagen
- 2014–2018: VfL Gummersbach
- 2018–2021: Füchse Berlin
- 2021–: SC DHfK Leipzig Handball
National team
Years	Team	Apps	(Gls)
2015–	Germany	66	(38)
Medal record
European Championship
Gold medal – first place	2016 Poland
Junior World Championship
Bronze medal – third place	2015 Brazil
- Updated on 10. August 2024

Simon Ernst (born 2 April 1994) is a German handball player, currently playing for SC DHfK Leipzig Handball and the German national team. He was part of the German team that won the 2016 European Championship.

== Career ==
Ernst started at Birkesdorfer TV 1864. In 2009 he joined TSV Bayer Dormagen, where he started at the youth teams. In 2012 he started playing for the 3. Liga men's team. In 2014 he joined VfL Gummersbach on a two year deal. In 2018 he joined Füchse Berlin. Despite tearing his cruciate ligament twice in a year, his contract was extended in 2018 until 2021. In October 2019 he tore his cruciate ligament for a third time.

In 2021 he joined SC DHfK Leipzig.

=== Season statistics ===
Season	Team	League	Games	Goals	Penalty goals	Outfield goals
2014/15	VfL Gummersbach	Bundesliga	36	42	0	42
2015/16	VfL Gummersbach	Bundesliga	30	85	0	85
2016/17	VfL Gummersbach	Bundesliga	34	128	6	122
2017/18	VfL Gummersbach	Bundesliga	6	40	4	36
2019/20	Füchse Berlin	Bundesliga	8	20	0	20
2020/21	Füchse Berlin	Bundesliga	38	17	0	17
2021/22	SC DHfK Leipzig	Bundesliga	34	22	0	22
2022/23	SC DHfK Leipzig	Bundesliga	34	57	0	57
2023/24	SC DHfK Leipzig	Bundesliga	28	27	0	27
2014–	Total	Bundesliga	248	438	10	428

Update 04.07.2024

=== National team ===
Ernst played 50 matches for various German youth national teams. In 2012 he won the U-18 European Championship with the German team and was included in the tournament all-star team as the playmaker. In 2015 he won bronze medals at the U-21 World Championship and was chosen as the best back player of the tournament.

On February 1, 2014 he debuted for the German B-national team.

On January 4, 2015 he made his debut for the German senior national team in a preparation game for the 2015 World Championship against Iceland.

At the 2016 European Championship in Poland he won gold medals with the German team, beating Spain in the final 24:17.

He was again a part of the German team at the 2022 European Championship.

At the 2023 World Championship he finished 5th with the German team.

== Achievements ==
- European Championship:
  - Gold: 2016

== Individual awards ==
- 2015 Men's Junior World Handball Championship All Star Team: Left back
