= Haniel Langaro =

Brazilian handball player (born 1995)

Personal information
- Full name: Haniel Vinícius Inoue Langaro
- Born: 7 March 1995 (age 31) Umuarama, Brazil
- Height: 1.97 m (6 ft 6 in)

Sport
- Sport: Handball
- Position: Left back
- Current club: Dinamo București
- Number: 37

Senior clubs
- Years: Team
- –2016: EC Pinheiros
- 2016–2017: Naturhouse La Rioja
- 2017–2020: Dunkerque HGL
- 2020–2024: FC Barcelona
- 2024–: Dinamo București
National team
| Years | Team | Apps | (Gls) |
| 2015- | Brazil | 90 | (396) |
Medal record
Pan American Games
| Silver medal – second place | 2023 Santiago | Team |
| Bronze medal – third place | 2019 Lima | Team |
Pan American Championship
| Gold medal – first place | 2016 Argentina |
South and Central American Championship
| Gold medal – first place | 2022 Brazil |
| Gold medal – first place | 2024 Argentina |
| Silver medal – second place | 2020 Brazil |
| Silver medal – second place | 2026 Paraguay |
Pan American Junior Championship
| Gold medal – first place | 2015 Brazil |
- Updated on 6 February 2023

Haniel Vinícius Inoue Langaro (born 7 March 1995) is a Brazilian professional handball player for Dinamo București and the Brazilian handball team.

== Career ==
Until January 2016 Langaro played for his hometown club EC Pinheiros. He then moved to Europe to join Spanish club Naturhouse La Rioja, where he played for a season before joining French club Dunkerque HGL.

In 2020 he joined FC Barcelona. Here he has won the EHF Champions League in 2021, 2022 and 2024, as well as the Spanish Championship and Spanish Cup in every season he was there. He also won the 2022 and 2023 Iberian Supercup.

In the summer of 2024 he joined Romanian Dinamo București. In his first season he won the Domestic treble of the Romanian Championship, Cup and Supercup.

=== National team ===
With Brazil he won the 2016 Pan American Championship. He participated at the 2016 Summer Olympics in Rio de Janeiro and again at the 2020 Olympics.

In 2025 he was part of the Brazilian team that reached the quarterfinal of the World Championship for the first time, knocking out Sweden, Norway and Spain. They lost the quarterfinal to Denmark.

== Honours ==
- EHF Champions League
  - Winner: 2021, 2022, 2024
- Liga ASOBAL
  - Winner: 2021, 2022, 2023, 2024
- Copa del Rey de Balonmano
  - Winner: 2021, 2022, 2023, 2024
- Copa ASOBAL
  - Winner: 2021, 2022, 2023, 2024
- Iberian Supercup
  - Winner: 2022, 2023
- Romanian Championship
  - Winner: 2025
- Romanian Men's Handball Cup
  - Winner: 2025

=== Individual awards ===
- 2020 South and Central American Men's Handball Championship: Best left back
