= Gustavo Rodrigues =

Brazilian handball player (born 1995)

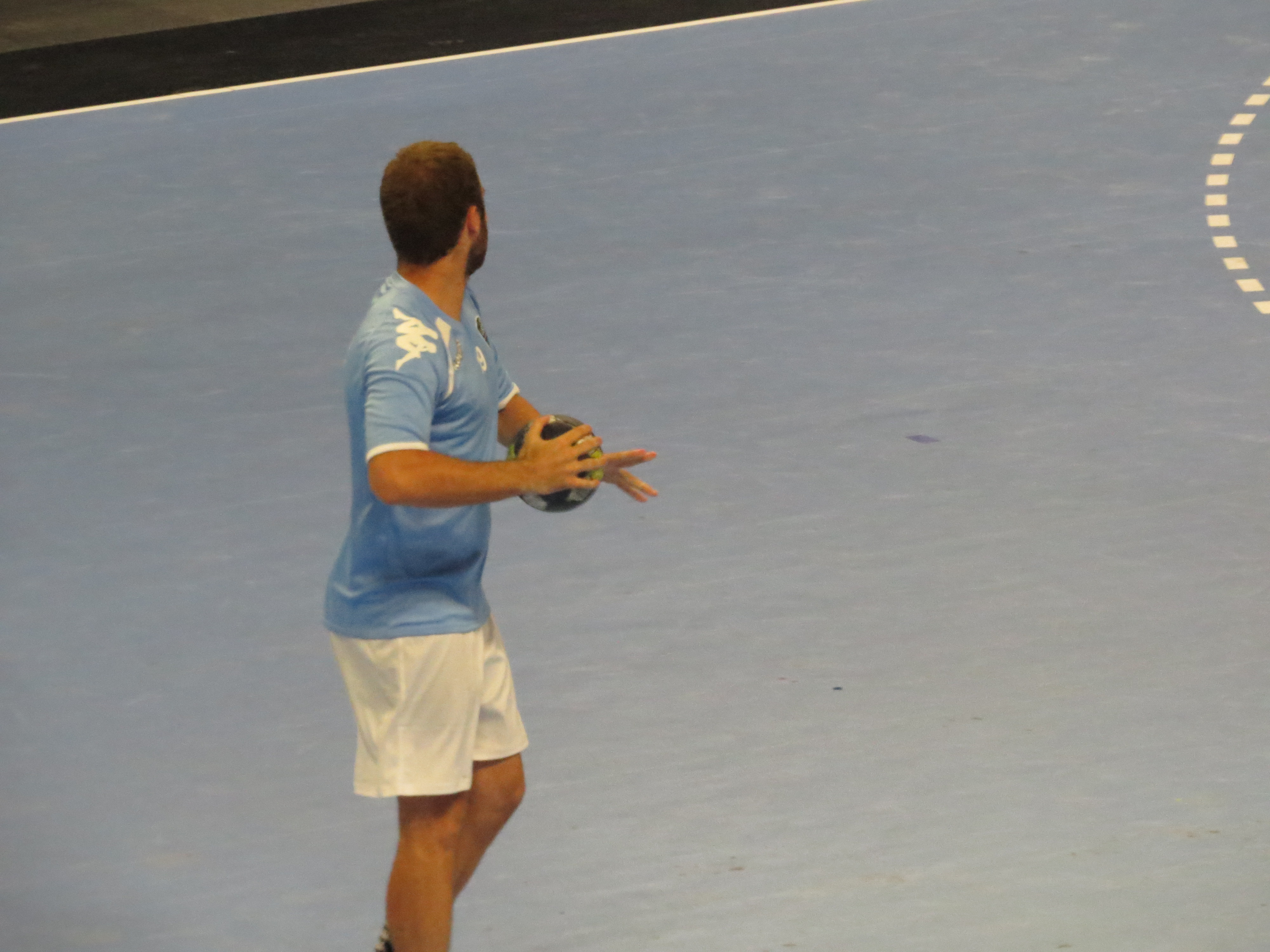
- Rodrigues in 2017

Personal information
- Full name: Gustavo Cesar Rodrigues
- Born: 9 April 1995 (age 31) São Paulo, Brazil
- Height: 1.90 m (6 ft 3 in)

Sport
- Sport: Handball
- Position: Right back
- Current club: Cesson Rennes MHB

Senior clubs
- Years: Team
- 2012-2015: EC Pinheiros
- 2015–2017: FC Porto
- 2017–2019: US Créteil Handball
- 2019–2021: Pontault-Combault Handball
- 2021–2025: Chambéry Savoie Handball
- 2025–: Cesson Rennes MHB
National team
| Years | Team | Apps | (Gls) |
| 2006- | Brazil | 54 | (135) |
Medal record
Pan American Games
| Silver medal – second place | 2023 Santiago | Team |
South and Central American Championship
| Gold medal – first place | 2022 Brazil |
| Gold medal – first place | 2024 Argentina |
| Silver medal – second place | 2020 Brazil |
Pan American Junior Championship
| Gold medal – first place | 2015 Brazil |

Gustavo Cesar Rodrigues (born 9 April 1995) is a Brazilian handball player for Cesson Rennes MHB and the Brazilian national team.

He represented Brazil at the 2019 World Men's Handball Championship.

In 2025 he was part of the Brazilian team that reached the quarterfinal of the World Championship for the first time, knocking out Sweden, Norway and Spain. They lost the quarterfinal to Denmark.
