= Daniel Ayala (handballer) =

Chilean handball player (born 1995)

Personal information
- Full name: Daniel Esteban Ayala Carrasco
- Born: 30 December 1995 (age 30) Vitacura, Chile
- Height: 1.78 m (5 ft 10 in)

Sport
- Sport: Handball
- Position: Right back

Senior clubs
- Years: Team
- 2013–2014: USAB
- 2014–2015: CB Alarcos
- 2015–2017: USAB
- 2017–2019: Universidad de Chile
- 2019–2020: USAB
- 2020–2021: Córdoba BM
National team
Years	Team	Apps	(Gls)
–	Chile	23	(35)
Medal record
Pan American Games
Silver medal – second place	2019 Lima	Team
Bronze medal – third place	2023 Santiago	Team
South and Central American Championship
Bronze medal – third place	2024 Argentina
South American Games
Bronze medal – third place	2018 Cochabamba	Team
Bolivarian Games
Gold medal – first place	2017 Santa Marta
Pan American Junior Championship
Bronze medal – third place	2015 Brazil

Daniel Esteban Ayala Carrasco (born 30 December 1995) is a Chilean handball player for the Chilean national team.

He represented Chile at the 2019 World Men's Handball Championship.
