= Nicolas Tournat =

French handball player (born 1994)

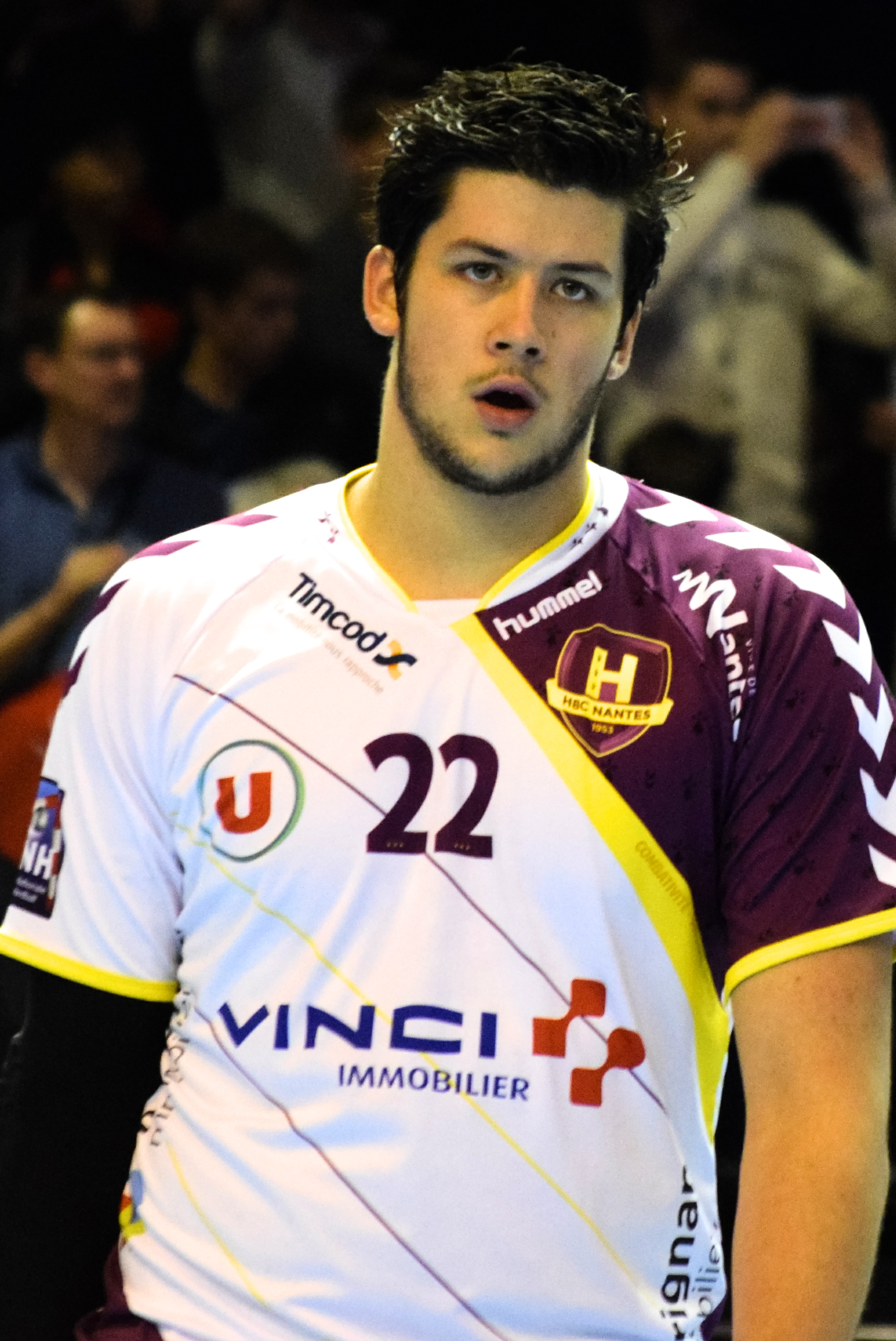
- Tournat in 2014

Personal information
- Nationality: French
- Born: 5 April 1994 (age 32) Niort, France
- Height: 2.00 m (6 ft 7 in)

Sport
- Sport: Handball
- Position: Pivot
- Current club: HBC Nantes
- Number: 11

Youth career
- Years: Team
- 2009–2012: Niort HBS
- 2012–2014: HBC Nantes

Senior clubs
- Years: Team
- 2014–2020: HBC Nantes
- 2020–2024: Industria Kielce
- 2024–: HBC Nantes
National team
Years	Team	Apps	(Gls)
2015–	France	118	(276)
Medal record
Olympic Games
Gold medal – first place	2020 Tokyo	Team
World Championship
Silver medal – second place	2023 Poland/Sweden
Bronze medal – third place	2025 Croatia/Denmark/Norway
European Championship
Gold medal – first place	2024 Germany
Bronze medal – third place	2018 Croatia
- Updated on 14 January 2026

Nicolas Tournat (born 5 April 1994) is a French handball player for HBC Nantes and the French national team.

He was part of the French team that won the bronze medal at the 2018 European Men's Handball Championship.

At the 2025 World Championship he won bronze medals with France, losing to Croatia in the semifinal and beating Portugal in the third place playoff.
