= Rudolph Hackbarth =

Brazilian handball player (born 1994)

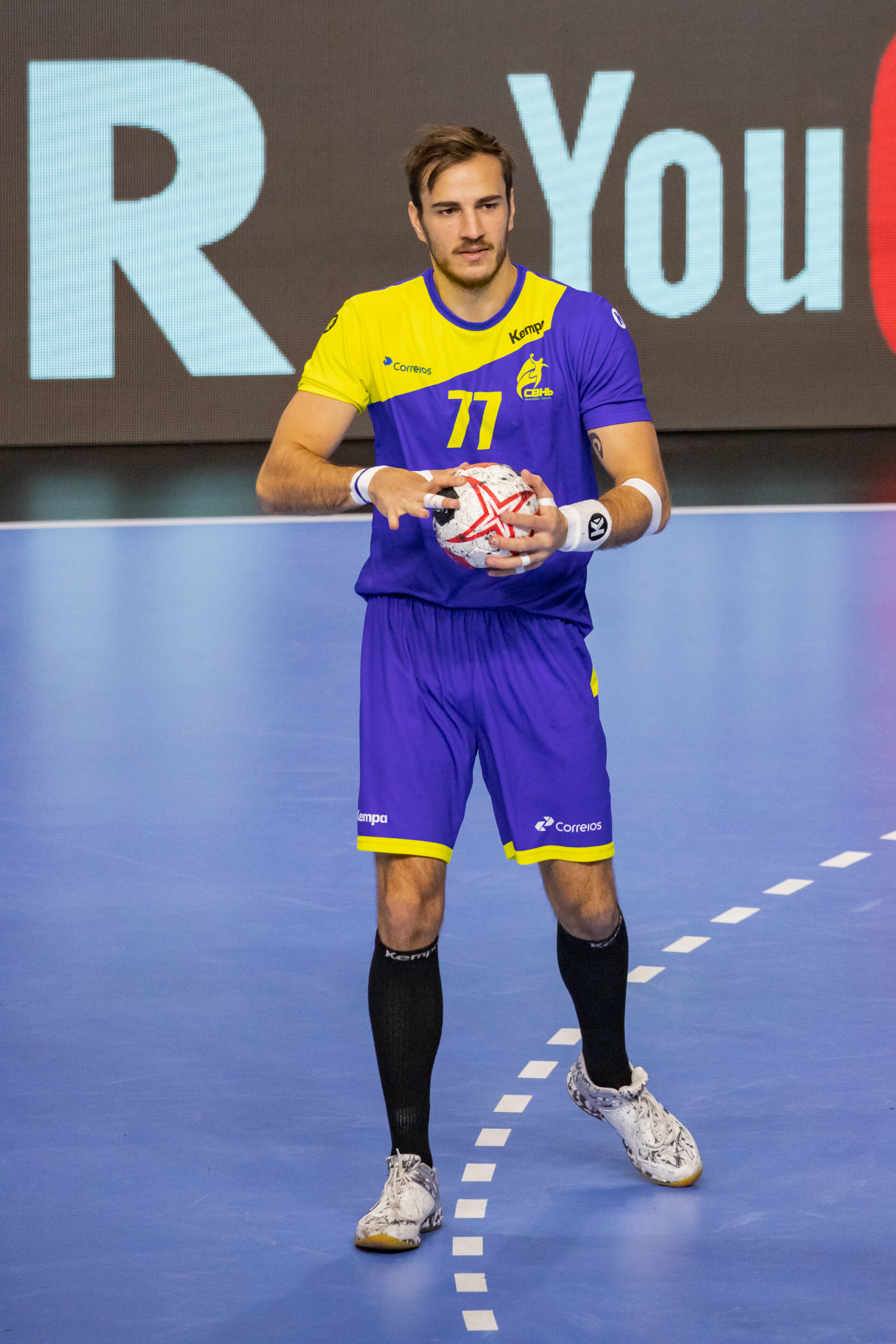

Personal information
- Born: 10 March 1994 (age 32) Blumenau, Brazil
- Height: 1.89 m (6 ft 2 in)

Sport
- Sport: Handball
- Position: Right wing
- Current club: RK Eurofarm Pelister
- Number: 7

Senior clubs
- Years: Team
- –: Handebol Blumenau
- –: Handebol Londrina
- –: Esporte Clube Pinheiros
- 2019–2021: BM Logroño La Rioja
- 2021–2023: Bada Huesca
- 2023–2025: REBI Balonmano Cuenca
- 2025–: RK Eurofarm Pelister
National team
Years	Team	Apps	(Gls)
–	Brazil	72	(187)
Medal record
Pan American Games
Silver medal – second place	2023 Santiago	Team
Bronze medal – third place	2019 Lima	Team
Pan American Championship
Silver medal – second place	2018 Greenland
South and Central American Championship
Gold medal – first place	2022 Brazil
Gold medal – first place	2024 Argentina
Silver medal – second place	2020 Brazil
Silver medal – second place	2026 Paraguay
South American Games
Gold medal – first place	2018 Cochabamba	Team
Pan American Junior Championship
Gold medal – first place	2015 Brazil

Rudolph Hackbarth (born 10 March 1994) is a Brazilian handball player who plays for RK Eurofarm Pelister and the Brazilian national team.

He represented Brazil at the 2019 World Men's Handball Championship. He competed at the 2020 Summer Olympics.

In 2025 he was part of the Brazilian team that reached the quarterfinal of the World Championship for the first time, knocking out Sweden, Norway and Spain. They lost the quarterfinal to Denmark.

== Titles ==
- Pan American Men's Club Handball Championship:
  - 2017

== Individual awards ==
- 2022 South and Central American Men's Handball Championship: Best right wing
- 2024 South and Central American Men's Handball Championship: Top scorer
