= Ginásio Municipal Tancredo Neves =

Indoor sporting arena

- Interactive map of Ginásio Municipal Tancredo Neves
- Full name: Ginásio Municipal Tancredo Neves
- Location: Uberlândia, Brazil
- Coordinates: 18°54′48″S 48°13′50″W
- Capacity: 8,000

Construction
- Opened: 2007

Ginásio Municipal Tancredo Neves is an indoor sporting arena located in Uberlândia, Brazil. The capacity of the arena is 8,000 spectators and opened in 2007. It hosts indoor sporting events such as basketball and volleyball, and also hosts concerts. It stands just to the east of Estádio Parque do Sabiá.

The arena is named after Tancredo Neves, a politician who had died shortly before taking office as the new president of Brazil in 1985.

The arena will host for the first time an UFC event on November 8, 2014.

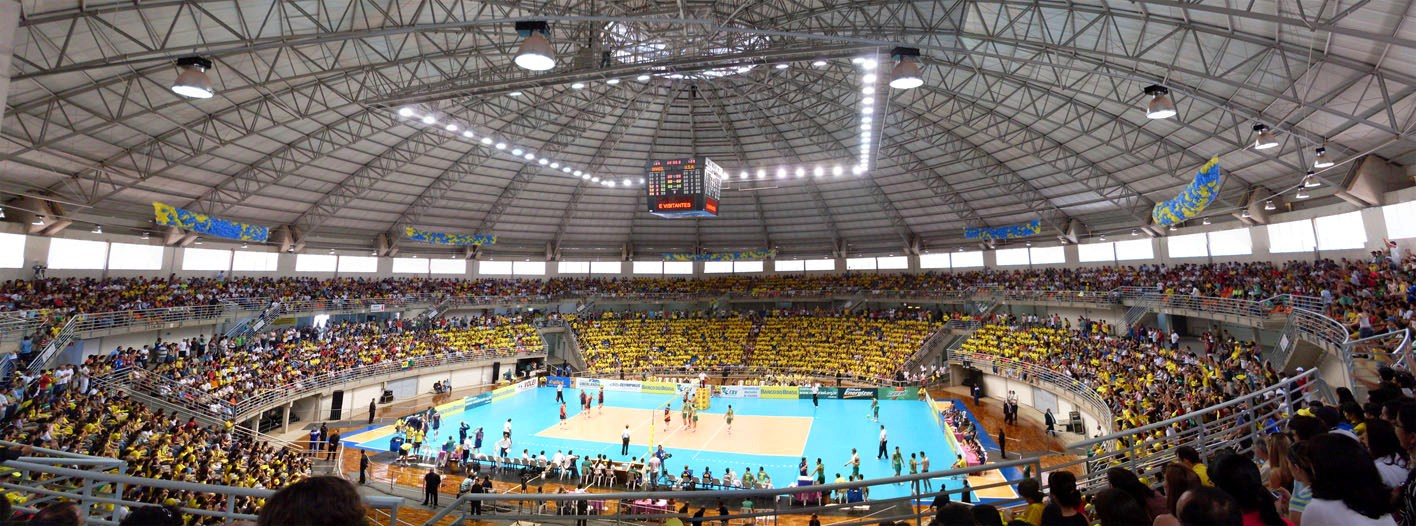
Arena Tancredo Neves during a friendly match between Brazil men's national volleyball team and the United States men's national volleyball team on 09/25/2009.

== See also ==
- List of indoor arenas in Brazil
