= Alexander Shkurinskiy =

Russian handball player

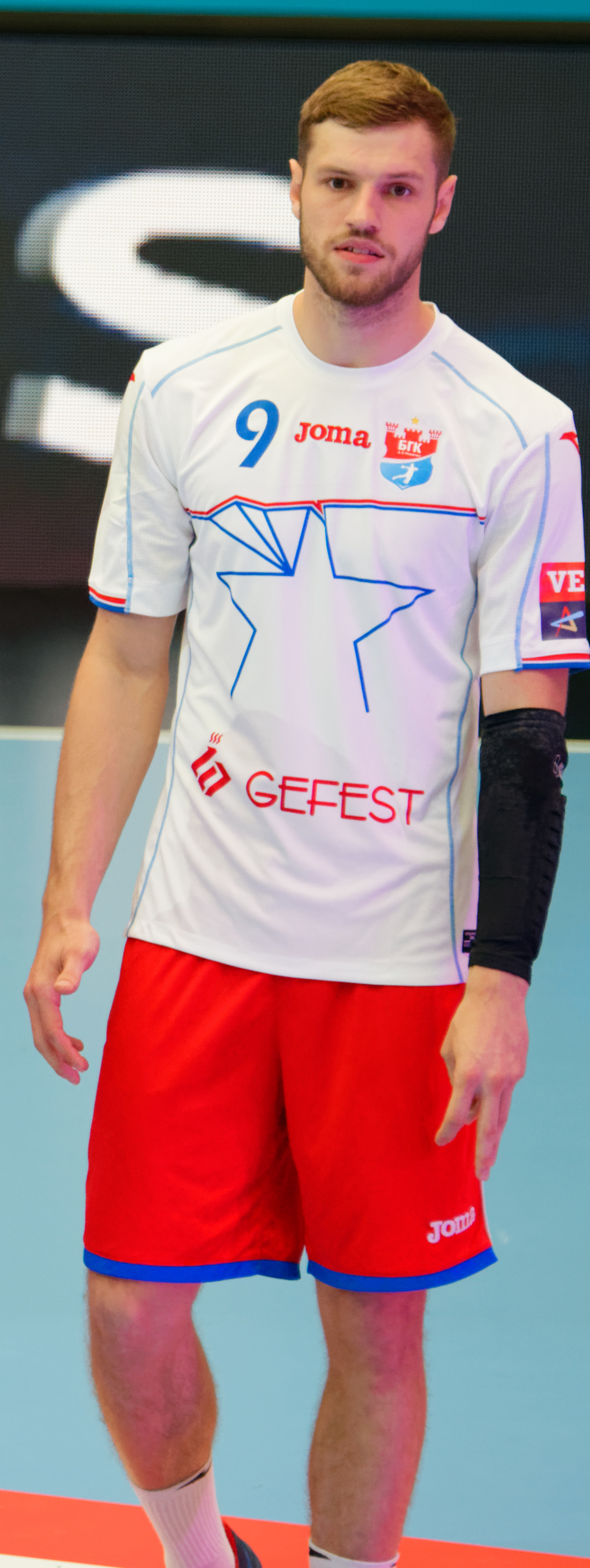

Personal information
- Nationality: Russian
- Born: 11 April 1995 (age 31) Krasnodar Krai, Russia
- Height: 1.93 m (6 ft 4 in)

Sport
- Sport: Handball
- Position: Left back
- Current club: HC Meshkov Brest
- Number: 9

Senior clubs
- Years: Team
- –2017: SKIF Krasnodar
- 2017–2021: HC Meshkov Brest
- 2021–2023: HBC Nantes
- 2023–: HC Meshkov Brest
National team
Years	Team	Apps	(Gls)
–	Russia	41	(88)
- Updated on 1 August 2023

Alexander Shkurinskiy (born 11 April 1995) is a Russian handball player for HC Meshkov Brest and the Russian national team.

He participated at the 2017 and the 2019 World Men's Handball Championship and at the 2020 European Men's Handball Championship.

== Career ==
Shkurinskiy started playing handball at his hometown club SKIF Krasnodar, where he won the 2017 Russian cup. In 2017 he joined Belarusian team HC Meshkov Brest. Here he won the 2018, 2019, 2020 and 2021 Belarusian championship and the 2018, 2020 and 2021 Belarusian Cup.

In 2021 he joined French side HBC Nantes. Here he won the Coupe de la Ligue in 2021, the Trophée des Champions in 2022, and the Coupe de France in 2023.

In 2023 he returned to HC Meshkov Brest.
