= Handball at the 2023 Pan American Games – Men's tournament =

Men's handball at the XIX Pan American Games

Tournament details
- Host country: Chile
- Venue: 1 (in 1 host city)
- Dates: 30 October – 4 November
- Teams: 8 (from 2 confederations)

Final positions
- Champions: Argentina (3rd title)
- Runners-up: Brazil
- Third place: Chile
- Fourth place: United States

Tournament statistics
- Matches played: 20
- Goals scored: 1,109 (55.45 per match)
- Top scorers: (Brazil) Jean-Pierre Dupoux (36 goals)

The men's handball tournament at the 2023 Pan American Games was the 10th edition of the handball event for men at the Pan American Games. It was held from 30 October to 4 November 2023. All games were played at the Gimnasio Polideportivo in Viña del Mar, Chile.

The winner of this tournament, Argentina, qualified for the 2024 Summer Olympics in Paris, France.

== Schedule ==
The schedule is as follows.

Legend
| G | Group stage | ¼ | Quarter-finals | ½ | Semi-finals | B | Bronze medal match | F | Gold medal match |

| Mon 30 | Tue 31 | Wed 1 | Thu 2 | Fri 3 | Sat 4 | |
|---|---|---|---|---|---|---|
| G | G | G | | ½ | B | F |

== Qualification ==
A total eight men's teams qualified to compete at the games in each tournament. The host nation (Chile) qualified automatically, along with seven other teams in various qualifying tournaments.

| Event | Dates | Location | Quota(s) | Qualified |
|---|---|---|---|---|
| Host Nation | —N/a | —N/a | 1 | Chile |
| 2021 Junior Pan American Games | 29 November – 4 December 2021 | (Colombia) Cali | 1 | Brazil |
| 2022 South American Games | 11–15 October 2022 | (Paraguay) Asunción | 2 | Argentina; Uruguay |
| USA–CAN Qualifying Round | 9 & 11 March 2023 | (United States) Colorado Springs | 1 | United States |
| 2023 Central American and Caribbean Games | 2–7 July 2023 | (El Salvador) San Salvador | 2 | Cuba; Dominican Republic |
| Last chance qualification tournament | 3–5 August 2023 | (Paraguay) Luque | 1 | Mexico |
| Total | | | 8 | |

== Results ==
All times are in Chile Time (UTC−3).

=== Preliminary round ===
==== Group A ====
| Pos | Team | Pld | W | D | L | GF | GA | GD | Pts | Qualification |
|---|---|---|---|---|---|---|---|---|---|---|
| 1 | Brazil | 3 | 3 | 0 | 0 | 117 | 67 | +50 | 6 | Semifinals |
| 2 | Chile (H) | 3 | 2 | 0 | 1 | 90 | 72 | +18 | 4 | Semifinals |
| 3 | Mexico | 3 | 1 | 0 | 2 | 66 | 102 | −36 | 2 | 5–8th place semifinals |
| 4 | Dominican Republic | 3 | 0 | 0 | 3 | 60 | 92 | −32 | 0 | 5–8th place semifinals |

Source: Santiago 2023
Rules for classification: 1) points; 2) head-to-head points; 3) head-to-head goal difference; 4) head-to-head goals scored; 5) goal difference; 6) goals scored; 7) draw.
(H) Hosts

| 30 October 2023; 17:30 | Brazil | 51–19 | Mexico | Gimnasio Polideportivo de Viña del Mar; Referees: Araújo, Perdomo (URU) |
| 30 October 2023; 17:30 | Dupoux 13 | (25–9) | Rodríguez 6 | Gimnasio Polideportivo de Viña del Mar; Referees: Araújo, Perdomo (URU) |
| 30 October 2023; 17:30 | 1× (yellow card) 2× (suspension) | Report | 3× (suspension) | Gimnasio Polideportivo de Viña del Mar; Referees: Araújo, Perdomo (URU) |

| 30 October 2023; 20:00 | Chile | 30–21 | Dominican Republic | Gimnasio Polideportivo de Viña del Mar; Referees: Correa, Conberse (ARG) |
| 30 October 2023; 20:00 | Salgado 7 | (12–10) | Beras 6 | Gimnasio Polideportivo de Viña del Mar; Referees: Correa, Conberse (ARG) |
| 30 October 2023; 20:00 | 6× (suspension) | Report | 1× (yellow card) 3× (suspension) 1× (red card) | Gimnasio Polideportivo de Viña del Mar; Referees: Correa, Conberse (ARG) |

| 31 October 2023; 17:30 | Dominican Republic | 20–36 | Brazil | Gimnasio Polideportivo de Viña del Mar; Referees: Reyes, Zuñiga (CUB) |
| 31 October 2023; 17:30 | Beras 6 | (11–18) | Hackbarth 7 | Gimnasio Polideportivo de Viña del Mar; Referees: Reyes, Zuñiga (CUB) |
| 31 October 2023; 17:30 | 1× (suspension) | Report | | Gimnasio Polideportivo de Viña del Mar; Referees: Reyes, Zuñiga (CUB) |

| 31 October 2023; 20:00 | Mexico | 21–32 | Chile | Gimnasio Polideportivo de Viña del Mar; Referees: García, Paolantoni (ARG) |
| 31 October 2023; 20:00 | Rodríguez, Sánchez 4 | (9–19) | Salinas 7 | Gimnasio Polideportivo de Viña del Mar; Referees: García, Paolantoni (ARG) |
| 31 October 2023; 20:00 | 1× (suspension) 1× (red card) | Report | 1× (yellow card) 3× (suspension) | Gimnasio Polideportivo de Viña del Mar; Referees: García, Paolantoni (ARG) |

| 1 November 2023; 17:30 | Dominican Republic | 19–26 | Mexico | Gimnasio Polideportivo de Viña del Mar; Referees: Magalhães, Godoy (BRA) |
| 1 November 2023; 17:30 | Soto 5 | (7–13) | Morales 6 | Gimnasio Polideportivo de Viña del Mar; Referees: Magalhães, Godoy (BRA) |
| 1 November 2023; 17:30 | 6× (suspension) 1× (red card) | Report | 2× (suspension) | Gimnasio Polideportivo de Viña del Mar; Referees: Magalhães, Godoy (BRA) |

| 1 November 2023; 20:00 | Chile | 28–30 | Brazil | Gimnasio Polideportivo de Viña del Mar; Referees: Sosa, Lemes (URU) |
| 1 November 2023; 20:00 | Er. Feuchtmann 10 | (12–15) | Dupoux, Langaro 6 | Gimnasio Polideportivo de Viña del Mar; Referees: Sosa, Lemes (URU) |
| 1 November 2023; 20:00 | 6× (suspension) | Report | 3× (yellow card) 5× (suspension) | Gimnasio Polideportivo de Viña del Mar; Referees: Sosa, Lemes (URU) |

==== Group B ====
| Pos | Team | Pld | W | D | L | GF | GA | GD | Pts | Qualification |
|---|---|---|---|---|---|---|---|---|---|---|
| 1 | Argentina | 3 | 3 | 0 | 0 | 93 | 50 | +43 | 6 | Semifinals |
| 2 | United States | 3 | 2 | 0 | 1 | 78 | 86 | −8 | 4 | Semifinals |
| 3 | Uruguay | 3 | 1 | 0 | 2 | 71 | 95 | −24 | 2 | 5–8th place semifinals |
| 4 | Cuba | 3 | 0 | 0 | 3 | 72 | 83 | −11 | 0 | 5–8th place semifinals |

Source: Santiago 2023
Rules for classification: 1) points; 2) head-to-head points; 3) head-to-head goal difference; 4) head-to-head goals scored; 5) goal difference; 6) goals scored; 7) draw.

| 30 October 2023; 10:00 | Cuba | 24–25 | Uruguay | Gimnasio Polideportivo de Viña del Mar; Referees: Hansen, Madsen (DEN) |
| 30 October 2023; 10:00 | Cordiés 8 | (13–13) | Rubbo 9 | Gimnasio Polideportivo de Viña del Mar; Referees: Hansen, Madsen (DEN) |
| 30 October 2023; 10:00 | 1× (yellow card) 2× (suspension) | Report | | Gimnasio Polideportivo de Viña del Mar; Referees: Hansen, Madsen (DEN) |

| 30 October 2023; 12:30 | Argentina | 28–14 | United States | Gimnasio Polideportivo de Viña del Mar; Referees: Sosa, Lemes (URU) |
| 30 October 2023; 12:30 | F. Pizarro 5 | (11–10) | Corning, Fofana 4 | Gimnasio Polideportivo de Viña del Mar; Referees: Sosa, Lemes (URU) |
| 30 October 2023; 12:30 | 1× (yellow card) 4× (suspension) | Report | 1× (yellow card) 4× (suspension) | Gimnasio Polideportivo de Viña del Mar; Referees: Sosa, Lemes (URU) |

| 31 October 2023; 10:00 | United States | 30–28 | Cuba | Gimnasio Polideportivo de Viña del Mar; Referees: Correa, Conberse (ARG) |
| 31 October 2023; 10:00 | Hoddersen 13 | (17–14) | Cordiés 8 | Gimnasio Polideportivo de Viña del Mar; Referees: Correa, Conberse (ARG) |
| 31 October 2023; 10:00 | 1× (suspension) | Report | 1× (yellow card) 3× (suspension) | Gimnasio Polideportivo de Viña del Mar; Referees: Correa, Conberse (ARG) |

| 31 October 2023; 12:30 | Uruguay | 16–37 | Argentina | Gimnasio Polideportivo de Viña del Mar; Referees: Magalhães, Godoy (BRA) |
| 31 October 2023; 12:30 | Cancio 5 | (7–19) | F. Pizarro 9 | Gimnasio Polideportivo de Viña del Mar; Referees: Magalhães, Godoy (BRA) |
| 31 October 2023; 12:30 | | Report | 1× (yellow card) 3× (suspension) | Gimnasio Polideportivo de Viña del Mar; Referees: Magalhães, Godoy (BRA) |

| 1 November 2023; 10:00 | United States | 34–30 | Uruguay | Gimnasio Polideportivo de Viña del Mar; Referees: Hansen, Madsen (DEN) |
| 1 November 2023; 10:00 | Fofana 6 | (19–15) | Cancio 9 | Gimnasio Polideportivo de Viña del Mar; Referees: Hansen, Madsen (DEN) |
| 1 November 2023; 10:00 | 3× (suspension) | Report | 1× (yellow card) 1× (suspension) 1× (red card) | Gimnasio Polideportivo de Viña del Mar; Referees: Hansen, Madsen (DEN) |

| 1 November 2023; 12:30 | Argentina | 28–20 | Cuba | Gimnasio Polideportivo de Viña del Mar; Referees: Araújo, Perdomo (URU) |
| 1 November 2023; 12:30 | F. Pizarro 7 | (14–9) | Vázquez 4 | Gimnasio Polideportivo de Viña del Mar; Referees: Araújo, Perdomo (URU) |
| 1 November 2023; 12:30 | 1× (yellow card) 2× (suspension) | Report | 1× (yellow card) 2× (suspension) 1× (red card) | Gimnasio Polideportivo de Viña del Mar; Referees: Araújo, Perdomo (URU) |

=== Classification round ===
5–8th place semifinals
3 November — Viña del Mar
Uruguay | 33
Dominican Republic | 29
3 November — Viña del Mar
Mexico | 22
Cuba | 25

Fifth place
4 November — Viña del Mar
Uruguay | 30
Cuba | 28
Seventh place
4 November — Viña del Mar
Dominican Republic | 24 (4)
Mexico | 24 (5)

==== 5–8th place semifinals ====
| 3 November 2023; 10:00 | Uruguay | 33–29 | Dominican Republic | Gimnasio Polideportivo de Viña del Mar; Referees: Magalhães, Godoy (BRA) |
| 3 November 2023; 10:00 | Cancio 8 | (20–15) | Beras 9 | Gimnasio Polideportivo de Viña del Mar; Referees: Magalhães, Godoy (BRA) |
| 3 November 2023; 10:00 | 1× (red card) | Report | 6× (suspension) | Gimnasio Polideportivo de Viña del Mar; Referees: Magalhães, Godoy (BRA) |

| 3 November 2023; 12:30 | Mexico | 22–25 | Cuba | Gimnasio Polideportivo de Viña del Mar; Referees: Sosa, Lemes (URU) |
| 3 November 2023; 12:30 | Morales 7 | (11–12) | García 10 | Gimnasio Polideportivo de Viña del Mar; Referees: Sosa, Lemes (URU) |
| 3 November 2023; 12:30 | 1× (suspension) | Report | 1× (yellow card) 4× (suspension) | Gimnasio Polideportivo de Viña del Mar; Referees: Sosa, Lemes (URU) |

==== Seventh place match ====
4 November 2023
10:00
Dominican Republic
28–29
Mexico
Gimnasio Polideportivo de Viña del Mar
Referees: Reyes, Zuñiga (CUB)
Beras, Rosario 6
(11–15)
Morales 9
4× (suspension)
Report
1× (yellow card) 3× (suspension)

FT: 24–24 Pen: 4–5

==== Fifth place match ====
| 4 November 2023; 12:30 | Uruguay | 30–28 | Cuba | Gimnasio Polideportivo de Viña del Mar; Referees: Paolantoni, García (ARG) |
| 4 November 2023; 12:30 | Cancio 6 | (13–14) | Almeida 8 | Gimnasio Polideportivo de Viña del Mar; Referees: Paolantoni, García (ARG) |
| 4 November 2023; 12:30 | 2× (yellow card) 5× (suspension) | Report | 1× (yellow card) 4× (suspension) | Gimnasio Polideportivo de Viña del Mar; Referees: Paolantoni, García (ARG) |

=== Medal round ===
Semifinals
3 November — Viña del Mar
Brazil | 40
United States | 27
3 November — Viña del Mar
Argentina | 33
Chile | 26

Final
4 November — Viña del Mar
Brazil | 25
Argentina | 32
Third place
4 November — Viña del Mar
United States | 27
Chile | 28

==== Semifinals ====
| 3 November 2023; 17:30 | Brazil | 40–27 | United States | Gimnasio Polideportivo de Viña del Mar; Referees: Araujo, Perdomo (URU) |
| 3 November 2023; 17:30 | Dupoux 8 | (23–13) | Hoddersen 6 | Gimnasio Polideportivo de Viña del Mar; Referees: Araujo, Perdomo (URU) |
| 3 November 2023; 17:30 | 3× (suspension) | Report | 1× (yellow card) 1× (suspension) | Gimnasio Polideportivo de Viña del Mar; Referees: Araujo, Perdomo (URU) |

| 3 November 2023; 20:00 | Argentina | 33–26 | Chile | Gimnasio Polideportivo de Viña del Mar; Referees: Hansen, Madsen (DEN) |
| 3 November 2023; 20:00 | F. Pizarro 8 | (17–13) | Er. Feuchtmann 9 | Gimnasio Polideportivo de Viña del Mar; Referees: Hansen, Madsen (DEN) |
| 3 November 2023; 20:00 | 5× (suspension) 2× (red card) | Report | 1× (yellow card) 2× (suspension) | Gimnasio Polideportivo de Viña del Mar; Referees: Hansen, Madsen (DEN) |

==== Bronze medal match ====
| 4 November 2023; 17:00 | United States | 27–28 | Chile | Gimnasio Polideportivo de Viña del Mar; Referees: Conberse, Correa (ARG) |
| 4 November 2023; 17:00 | Corning 7 | (13–15) | Ayala, Salinas 5 | Gimnasio Polideportivo de Viña del Mar; Referees: Conberse, Correa (ARG) |
| 4 November 2023; 17:00 | 1× (suspension) | Report | 1× (yellow card) 1× (suspension) | Gimnasio Polideportivo de Viña del Mar; Referees: Conberse, Correa (ARG) |

==== Gold medal match ====
| 4 November 2023; 19:30 | Brazil | 25–32 | Argentina | Gimnasio Polideportivo de Viña del Mar; Referees: Hansen, Madsen (DEN) |
| 4 November 2023; 19:30 | Dupoux 6 | (14–16) | Bono 6 | Gimnasio Polideportivo de Viña del Mar; Referees: Hansen, Madsen (DEN) |
| 4 November 2023; 19:30 | 3× (suspension) 1× (red card) | Report | 4× (yellow card) 1× (suspension) 1× (red card) | Gimnasio Polideportivo de Viña del Mar; Referees: Hansen, Madsen (DEN) |

== Ranking and statistics ==
| Rank | Team |
|---|---|
| 1st place, gold medalist(s) | Argentina |
| 2nd place, silver medalist(s) | Brazil |
| 3rd place, bronze medalist(s) | Chile |
| 4 | United States |
| 5 | Uruguay |
| 6 | Cuba |
| 7 | Mexico |
| 8 | Dominican Republic |

| Qualified for the 2024 Summer Olympics |
| Qualified for the 2024 Olympic Qualification Tournaments |

=== Top scorers ===
| Rank | Name | Goals | Shots | % | 7 m | MP | Mean |
|---|---|---|---|---|---|---|---|
| 1 | (Brazil) Jean-Pierre Dupoux | 36 | 42 | 86 % | 11/12 | 5 | 7,2 |
| 2 | (Argentina) Federico Pizarro | 34 | 46 | 74 % | 3/3 | 5 | 6,8 |
| 3 | (Uruguay) Máximo Cancio | 31 | 44 | 70 % | - | 5 | 6,2 |
| 3 | (United States) Samuel Hoddersen | 31 | 47 | 66 % | 10/15 | 5 | 6,2 |
| 3 | (Chile) Erwin Feuchtmann | 31 | 49 | 63 % | 15/17 | 5 | 6,2 |

Source: Santiago 2023

=== Top goalkeepers ===
| Rank | Name | % | Saves | Shots |
|---|---|---|---|---|
| 1 | (Argentina) Juan Bar | 49 | 37 | 76 |
| 2 | (Chile) Vicente González | 39 | 24 | 62 |
| 3 | (Brazil) Rangel da Rosa | 34 | 32 | 93 |
| 4 | (Argentina) Leonel Maciel | 33 | 26 | 78 |
| 5 | (Brazil) Leonardo Terçariol | 32 | 30 | 93 |

Source: Santiago 2023
