= 2015 Pan American Men's Junior Handball Championship =

Tournament details
- Host country: Brazil
- Venue: 1 (in 1 host city)
- Dates: 24–28 March
- Teams: 6 (from 1 confederation)

Final positions
- Champions: Brazil (5th title)
- Runners-up: Argentina
- Third place: Chile
- Fourth place: Uruguay

Tournament statistics
- Matches played: 15
- Goals scored: 783 (52.2 per match)
- Top scorers: Tomas Bernachea (ARG) (34 goals)

Awards
- Best player: Acacio Moreira Filho (BRA)

The 2015 Pan American Men's Junior Handball Championship took place in Foz do Iguaçu from 24 to 28 March. It acts as the Pan American qualifying tournament for the 2015 Men's Junior World Handball Championship.

== Results ==
Team	Pld	W	D	L	GF	GA	GD	Pts
Brazil	5	5	0	0	191	94	+97	10
Argentina	5	4	0	1	169	97	+72	8
Chile	5	3	0	2	131	108	+23	6
Uruguay	5	2	0	3	110	117	–7	4
Paraguay	5	1	0	4	113	164	–51	2
Peru	5	0	0	5	69	203	–134	0

== Round robin ==
March 24; 14:30	Chile	33 – 25	Paraguay	Ginásio de Esportes Costa Cavalcanti, Foz do Iguaçu
March 24; 14:30	Ayala 10	(12–14)	Salinas 6	Ginásio de Esportes Costa Cavalcanti, Foz do Iguaçu
March 24; 14:30	3× (yellow card) 6× (suspension)	Report	3× (yellow card) 2× (suspension)	Ginásio de Esportes Costa Cavalcanti, Foz do Iguaçu

March 24; 16:30	Argentina	31 – 16	Uruguay	Ginásio de Esportes Costa Cavalcanti, Foz do Iguaçu
March 24; 16:30	Bernachea 11	(11–8)	Mendez 6	Ginásio de Esportes Costa Cavalcanti, Foz do Iguaçu
March 24; 16:30	3× (yellow card) 3× (suspension)	Report	3× (yellow card) 4× (suspension)	Ginásio de Esportes Costa Cavalcanti, Foz do Iguaçu

March 24; 19:00	Brazil	48 – 9	Peru	Ginásio de Esportes Costa Cavalcanti, Foz do Iguaçu
March 24; 19:00	Andrade, Hackbarth 7	(25–4)	Lazo, Trelles 3	Ginásio de Esportes Costa Cavalcanti, Foz do Iguaçu
March 24; 19:00	2× (yellow card) 2× (suspension)	Report	3× (yellow card) 2× (suspension)	Ginásio de Esportes Costa Cavalcanti, Foz do Iguaçu

March 25; 14:00	Paraguay	15 – 37	Argentina	Ginásio de Esportes Costa Cavalcanti, Foz do Iguaçu
March 25; 14:00	Arce 5	(6–18)	Werner 7	Ginásio de Esportes Costa Cavalcanti, Foz do Iguaçu
March 25; 14:00	3× (yellow card) 4× (suspension)	Report	3× (yellow card) 2× (suspension)	Ginásio de Esportes Costa Cavalcanti, Foz do Iguaçu

March 25; 16:00	Peru	8 – 41	Chile	Ginásio de Esportes Costa Cavalcanti, Foz do Iguaçu
March 25; 16:00	Trelles, Silvera 2	(2–19)	Paniagua 10	Ginásio de Esportes Costa Cavalcanti, Foz do Iguaçu
March 25; 16:00	2× (yellow card) 5× (suspension)	Report	2× (yellow card) 1× (suspension)	Ginásio de Esportes Costa Cavalcanti, Foz do Iguaçu

March 25; 18:00	Uruguay	21 – 37	Brazil	Ginásio de Esportes Costa Cavalcanti, Foz do Iguaçu
March 25; 18:00	Ancheta 5	(13–19)	Hackbarth 7	Ginásio de Esportes Costa Cavalcanti, Foz do Iguaçu
March 25; 18:00	3× (yellow card) 4× (suspension)	Report	2× (yellow card) 6× (suspension)	Ginásio de Esportes Costa Cavalcanti, Foz do Iguaçu

March 26; 15:00	Argentina	46 – 12	Peru	Ginásio de Esportes Costa Cavalcanti, Foz do Iguaçu
March 26; 15:00	Nuñes 8	(26–4)	Trelles 6	Ginásio de Esportes Costa Cavalcanti, Foz do Iguaçu
March 26; 15:00	2× (yellow card) 4× (suspension)	Report	3× (yellow card) 5× (suspension)	Ginásio de Esportes Costa Cavalcanti, Foz do Iguaçu

March 26; 17:00	Uruguay	25 – 20	Paraguay	Ginásio de Esportes Costa Cavalcanti, Foz do Iguaçu
March 26; 17:00	Ancheta, Vecino 6	(17–11)	Martinez 4	Ginásio de Esportes Costa Cavalcanti, Foz do Iguaçu
March 26; 17:00	2× (yellow card) 6× (suspension) 1× (red card)	Report	3× (yellow card) 3× (suspension)	Ginásio de Esportes Costa Cavalcanti, Foz do Iguaçu

March 26; 19:00	Brazil	30 – 21	Chile	Ginásio de Esportes Costa Cavalcanti, Foz do Iguaçu
March 26; 19:00	Rodrigues 7	(14–12)	Martinez 6	Ginásio de Esportes Costa Cavalcanti, Foz do Iguaçu
March 26; 19:00	2× (yellow card) 5× (suspension)	Report	3× (yellow card) 2× (suspension)	Ginásio de Esportes Costa Cavalcanti, Foz do Iguaçu

March 27; 15:00	Uruguay	35 – 13	Peru	Ginásio de Esportes Costa Cavalcanti, Foz do Iguaçu
March 27; 15:00	Ancheta 10	(18–7)	Trelles 4	Ginásio de Esportes Costa Cavalcanti, Foz do Iguaçu
March 27; 15:00	3× (yellow card) 3× (suspension)	Report	3× (yellow card) 6× (suspension)	Ginásio de Esportes Costa Cavalcanti, Foz do Iguaçu

March 27; 17:00	Chile	20 – 32	Argentina	Ginásio de Esportes Costa Cavalcanti, Foz do Iguaçu
March 27; 17:00	Bastidas 7	(8–21)	Bernachea 7	Ginásio de Esportes Costa Cavalcanti, Foz do Iguaçu
March 27; 17:00	3× (yellow card) 2× (suspension)	Report	3× (yellow card) 5× (suspension)	Ginásio de Esportes Costa Cavalcanti, Foz do Iguaçu

March 27; 19:00	Paraguay	20 – 42	Brazil	Ginásio de Esportes Costa Cavalcanti, Foz do Iguaçu
March 27; 19:00	Arce 5	(10–23)	Ferreira, Andrade 6	Ginásio de Esportes Costa Cavalcanti, Foz do Iguaçu
March 27; 19:00	3× (yellow card) 1× (suspension)	Report	3× (yellow card) 4× (suspension)	Ginásio de Esportes Costa Cavalcanti, Foz do Iguaçu

March 28; 15:00	Paraguay	33 – 27	Peru	Ginásio de Esportes Costa Cavalcanti, Foz do Iguaçu
March 28; 15:00	Mora 10	(16–15)	Trelles 9	Ginásio de Esportes Costa Cavalcanti, Foz do Iguaçu
March 28; 15:00	3× (yellow card) 5× (suspension)	Report	2× (yellow card) 7× (suspension)	Ginásio de Esportes Costa Cavalcanti, Foz do Iguaçu

March 28; 17:00	Chile	16 – 13	Uruguay	Ginásio de Esportes Costa Cavalcanti, Foz do Iguaçu
March 28; 17:00	Huerta 7	(7–6)	Vecino 4	Ginásio de Esportes Costa Cavalcanti, Foz do Iguaçu
March 28; 17:00	3× (yellow card) 2× (suspension)	Report	3× (yellow card) 4× (suspension)	Ginásio de Esportes Costa Cavalcanti, Foz do Iguaçu

March 28; 19:00	Argentina	23 – 34	Brazil	Ginásio de Esportes Costa Cavalcanti, Foz do Iguaçu
March 28; 19:00	Bernachea 8	(11–16)	Rodrigues 7	Ginásio de Esportes Costa Cavalcanti, Foz do Iguaçu
March 28; 19:00	3× (yellow card) 5× (suspension) 1× (red card)	Report	3× (yellow card) 7× (suspension) 2× (red card)	Ginásio de Esportes Costa Cavalcanti, Foz do Iguaçu

== Final standing ==
Rank	Team
Gold medal	Brazil
Silver medal	Argentina
Bronze medal	Chile
4	Uruguay
5	Paraguay
6	Peru

Team qualified to the 2015 Men's Junior World Handball Championship
