= Pan American Men's Junior Handball Championship =

Sport competition

The Pan American Men's Junior Handball Championship was the official competition for junior men's national handball teams of Americas, and took place every two years. In addition to crowning the Pan American champions, the tournament also served as a qualifying tournament for the IHF Junior World Handball Championship. In 2018, the PATHF was folded and the tournament was replaced with the North American & Caribbean and South and Central American Men's Junior Handball Championships.

== Summary ==
Year	Host	Final			Third place match		
Year	Host	Champion	Score	Runner-up	Third place	Score	Fourth place
1993; Details	(Brazil); Foz do Iguaçu	Argentina	No playoffs	Brazil	Uruguay	No playoffs	Paraguay
1997; Details	(Brazil); Pontal do Paraná	Brazil	24 – 20	Argentina	Uruguay	21 – 17	Chile
1999; Details	(Puerto Rico); Guaynabo	Brazil	23 – 10	Argentina	Puerto Rico	21 – 18	Colombia
2001; Details	(United States); Atlanta	Brazil	26 – 23	Argentina	Canada	22 – 21	Chile
2002; Details	(Chile); Santiago	Argentina	No playoffs	Brazil	Puerto Rico	No playoffs	Chile
2005; Details	(Argentina); Mar del Plata	Argentina	No playoffs	Brazil	Chile	No playoffs	Uruguay
2007; Details	(Chile); Santiago	Argentina	29 – 28	Brazil	Chile	24 – 20	Uruguay
2009; Details	(Argentina); Buenos Aires	Argentina	No playoffs	Brazil	Greenland	No playoffs	Chile
2011; Details	(Brazil); Brasília	Argentina	No playoffs	Brazil	Canada	No playoffs	Chile
2013; Details	(Argentina); Mar del Plata	Brazil	25 – 21	Argentina	Chile	34 – 28	Puerto Rico
2015; Details	(Brazil); Foz do Iguaçu	Brazil	No playoffs	Argentina	Chile	No playoffs	Uruguay
2017; Details	(Paraguay); Asunción	Brazil	31 – 23	Argentina	Chile	23 – 18	United States

== Medal table ==
Rank	Nation	Gold	Silver	Bronze	Total
1	Argentina	6	6	0	12
1	Brazil	6	6	0	12
3	Chile	0	0	5	5
4	Canada	0	0	2	2
4	Puerto Rico	0	0	2	2
4	Uruguay	0	0	2	2
7	Greenland	0	0	1	1
Totals (7 entries)		12	12	12	36

== Participating nations ==
Nation	(Brazil) 1993	(Brazil) 1997	(Puerto Rico) 1999	(United States) 2001	(Chile) 2002	(Argentina) 2005	(Chile) 2007	(Argentina) 2009	(Brazil) 2011	(Argentina) 2013	(Brazil) 2015	(Paraguay) 2017	Years
Argentina	1st	2nd	2nd	2nd	1st	1st	1st	1st	1st	2nd	2nd	2nd	12
Brazil	2nd	1st	1st	1st	2nd	2nd	2nd	2nd	2nd	1st	1st	1st	12
Canada	-	-	5th	3rd	5th	-	6th	-	3rd	8th	-	-	6
Chile	-	4th	-	4th	4th	3rd	3rd	4th	4th	3rd	3rd	3rd	10
Colombia	-	-	4th	5th	-	-	-	-	-	-	-	-	2
Dominican Republic	-	-	6th	-	-	-	7th	-	-	-	-	6th	3
Greenland	-	-	-	-	-	5th	-	3rd	-	-	-	-	2
Mexico	-	-	-	6th	-	-	-	6th	-	7th	-	-	3
Paraguay	4th	-	-	-	-	-	-	-	-	9th	5th	5th	4
Peru	-	-	-	-	-	-	-	-	-	-	6th	-	1
Puerto Rico	-	5th	3rd	8th	3rd	6th	5th	-	-	4th	-	-	7
United States	-	-	7th	7th	6th	-	-	-	-	-	-	4th	4
Uruguay	3rd	3rd	-	-	-	4th	4th	5th	5th	5th	4th	7th	9
Venezuela	-	-	-	-	-	-	-	-	-	6th	-	-	1
Total	4	5	7	8	6	6	7	6	5	9	6	7	
