= Torneo Nacional de Clubes 2016 =

2016 Torneo Nacional de Clubes

Tournament details
- Host country: Argentina
- Venue(s): 2 (in 1 host city)
- Dates: 04–08 September
- Teams: 8

Final positions
- Champions: UNLu (1st title)
- Runners-up: SAG Villa Ballester
- Third place: Colegio Ward
- Fourth place: Municipalidad de Maipú

Tournament statistics
- Matches played: 20
- Goals scored: 1,078 (53.9 per match)

The Torneo Nacional de Clubes 2016 (2016 Clubs National Tournament) was the 41st edition of the main clubs handball tournament organised by the Confederación Argentina de Handball, it was held between 04–08 October at the city of Comodoro Rivadavia.

== Groups Stage ==
=== Group A ===
Team	Pld	W	D	L	GF	GA	GD
SAG Villa Ballester	3	3	0	0	95	78	17
Municipalidad de Maipú	3	2	0	1	93	83	10
CISD Nueva Generacion	3	1	0	2	77	80	-3
EMH Viedma	3	0	0	3	60	84	-24

=== Group B ===
Team	Pld	W	D	L	GF	GA	GD
UNLu	3	3	0	0	106	61	45
Colegio Ward	3	2	0	1	99	68	31
Belgrano de San Nicolas	3	1	0	2	55	104	-49
CSD Petroquimica	3	0	0	3	55	82	-27

Teams qualified to the semi-finals

== Knockout stage ==
=== Championship bracket ===
Semifinals
12 September
SAG Villa Ballester	31
Colegio Ward	25
12 September
UNLu	31
Municipalidad de Maipú	19

Final
13 September
SAG Villa Ballester	34
UNLu	36
Third place game
13 September
Colegio Ward	31
Municipalidad de Maipú	23

=== 5–8th place bracket ===
Semifinals
12 September
CISD Nueva Generacion	18
CSD Petroquimica	22
12 September
Belgrano de San Nicolas	22
EMH Viedma	26

Fifth place game
12 September
CISD Nueva Generacion	33
EMH Viedma	32
Seventh place game
12 September
CSD Petroquimica	39
Belgrano de San Nicolas	28

== Final ==
8 october 2016; 13:20	SAG Villa Ballester	34–36	UNLu	Comodoro Rivadavia; Referees: Marina, Acuna (ARG)
8 october 2016; 13:20	Aizen 7	(19–18)	Fernandez 11	Comodoro Rivadavia; Referees: Marina, Acuna (ARG)
8 october 2016; 13:20	3× (yellow card) 4× (suspension) 1× (red card)	Report	1× (yellow card) 5× (suspension)	Comodoro Rivadavia; Referees: Marina, Acuna (ARG)

== Final standing ==
Rank	Team
1	UNLu
2	SAG Villa Ballester
3	Colegio Ward
4	Municipalidad de Maipú
5	CISD Nueva Generación
6	EMH Viedma
7	Belgrano de San Nicolas
*	CSD Petroquimica (invited)

Team qualified to the 2017 Pan American Men's Club Handball Championship

== Awards ==
All-star team

- Goalkeeper: (Argentina) Tomás Villarroel
- Right Wing: (Argentina) Ramiro Martínez
- Right Back: (Argentina) Federico Pizarro
- Playmaker: (Argentina) Nicolás Bono
- Left Back: (Argentina) Juan Pablo Fernández
- Left Wing: (Argentina) Leonardo Werner
- Pivot: (Argentina) Mariano Canepa
