= 2023 IHF Men's Super Globe =

Club handball world championship

Tournament details
- Host country: Saudi Arabia
- Venue: 1 (in 1 host city)
- Dates: 7–12 November
- Teams: 12 (from 6 confederations)

Final positions
- Champions: (Germany) SC Magdeburg (3rd title)
- Runners-up: (Germany) Füchse Berlin
- Third place: (Spain) Barcelona
- Fourth place: (Poland) Industria Kielce

Tournament statistics
- Matches played: 24
- Goals scored: 1,473 (61.38 per match)
- Attendance: 23,150 (965 per match)
- Top scorers: Mathias Gidsel (45 goals)

Awards
- Best player: Mathias Gidsel

‌The 2023 IHF Men's Super Globe was the 16th edition of the yearly club world championship in handball, held from 7 to 12 November 2023 in Dammam, Saudi Arabia under the aegis of the International Handball Federation (IHF). It was the fourth time in history that the event was organised by the Saudi Arabian Handball Federation.

SC Magdeburg defeated Füchse Berlin to win their third consecutive title.

== Teams ==
Twelve teams competed in the tournament: the winners of the continental tournaments, the defending champion, two host teams and two wild card teams.

Team	Qualified as
(Germany) SC Magdeburg	Defending champion
(Egypt) Al Ahly	Winner of 2023 African Handball Super Cup
(Bahrain) Al-Najma	Winner of Asian Club League Championship
(Australia) University of Queensland	Winner of 2023 Oceania Handball Champions Cup
(United States) San Francisco CalHeat	Winner of North American and Caribbean Senior Club Championship
(Argentina) San Fernando HB	Winner of South and Central American Men's Club Handball Championship
(Poland) Industria Kielce	Runner-up of EHF Champions League (Note: SC Magdeburg was the winner of the EHF Champions League but they are already qualified as defending champion)
Al-Kuwait SC	Winner of Arab Handball Championship of Champions
(Saudi Arabia) Khaleej Club	Host (Winner and Runner-up of the Saudi Handball League)
(Saudi Arabia) Al-Noor Club	Host (Winner and Runner-up of the Saudi Handball League)
(Germany) Füchse Berlin	Wildcard (Winner of EHF European League)
(Spain) Barcelona	Wildcard (Third of EHF Champions League)

== Draw ==
The draw was held on 28 September 2022.

=== Seeding ===
Pot 1	Pot 2	Pot 3
(Germany) SC Magdeburg (Poland) Industria Kielce (Egypt) Al Ahly; Al-Kuwait SC	(Saudi Arabia) Khaleej Club (Argentina) San Fernando HB (Bahrain) Al-Najma (Saudi Arabia) Al-Noor Club	(Australia) University of Queensland (United States) San Francisco CalHeat (Spain) Barcelona (Germany) Füchse Berlin

== Referees ==
The referee pairs were announced on 6 October 2023.

Referees
Algeria	Youcef Belkhiri; Sidali Hamidi
Argentina	Sebastián Lenci; Julian Grillo
Czech Republic	Václav Horáček; Jiří Novotný
France	Karim Gasmi; Raouf Gasmi

Referees
Hungary	Ádám Bíró; Olivér Kiss
Norway	Håvard Kleven; Lars Jørum
Spain	Andreu Marín; Ignacio García
Sweden	Mirza Kurtagic; Mattias Wetterwik

== Preliminary round ==
All times are local (UTC+3).

=== Group A ===
Pos	Team	Pld	W	D	L	GF	GA	GD	Pts	Qualification
1	(Spain) Barcelona	2	2	0	0	80	45	+35	4	Semifinals
2	(Egypt) Al Ahly	2	1	0	1	64	57	+7	2	5–8th place semifinals
3	(Saudi Arabia) Al-Noor Club	2	0	0	2	39	81	−42	0	9–12th place semifinals

Source: IHF
Rules for classification: 1) points; 2) head-to-head points; 3) head-to-head goal difference; 4) head-to-head number of goals scored; 5) goal difference.

7 November 2023; 16:00	Al Ahly (Egypt)	38–20	(Saudi Arabia) Al-Noor Club	Dammam Sports Hall, Dammam; Attendance: 1,500; Referees: Kleven, Jørum (NOR)
7 November 2023; 16:00	Hassan 6	(16–12)	Landim 7	Dammam Sports Hall, Dammam; Attendance: 1,500; Referees: Kleven, Jørum (NOR)
7 November 2023; 16:00	4× (suspension) 1× (red card)	Report	5× (suspension)	Dammam Sports Hall, Dammam; Attendance: 1,500; Referees: Kleven, Jørum (NOR)

8 November 2023; 16:45	Al-Noor Club (Saudi Arabia)	19–43	(Spain) Barcelona	Dammam Sports Hall, Dammam; Attendance: 500; Referees: Bíró, Kiss (HUN)
8 November 2023; 16:45	Landim 5	(10–20)	Gómez, Janc 7	Dammam Sports Hall, Dammam; Attendance: 500; Referees: Bíró, Kiss (HUN)
8 November 2023; 16:45	5× (suspension)	Report	1× (suspension)	Dammam Sports Hall, Dammam; Attendance: 500; Referees: Bíró, Kiss (HUN)

9 November 2023; 19:00	Al Ahly (Egypt)	26–37	(Spain) Barcelona	Dammam Sports Hall, Dammam; Attendance: 2,000; Referees: Horáček, Novotný (CZE)
9 November 2023; 19:00	Abdou, Hassan 5	(16–19)	Valera 7	Dammam Sports Hall, Dammam; Attendance: 2,000; Referees: Horáček, Novotný (CZE)
9 November 2023; 19:00	1× (suspension)	Report	1× (suspension) 1× (red card)	Dammam Sports Hall, Dammam; Attendance: 2,000; Referees: Horáček, Novotný (CZE)

=== Group B ===
Pos	Team	Pld	W	D	L	GF	GA	GD	Pts	Qualification
1	(Germany) Füchse Berlin	2	2	0	0	85	62	+23	4	Semifinals
2	Al-Kuwait SC	2	1	0	1	69	66	+3	2	5–8th place semifinals
3	(Argentina) San Fernando HB	2	0	0	2	63	89	−26	0	9–12th place semifinals

Source: IHF
Rules for classification: 1) points; 2) head-to-head points; 3) head-to-head goal difference; 4) head-to-head number of goals scored; 5) goal difference.

7 November 2023; 13:45	Al-Kuwait SC	41–29	(Argentina) San Fernando HB	Dammam Sports Hall, Dammam; Attendance: 250; Referees: Horáček, Novotný (CZE)
7 November 2023; 13:45	Saleh 7	(19–15)	J. Fernández 8	Dammam Sports Hall, Dammam; Attendance: 250; Referees: Horáček, Novotný (CZE)
7 November 2023; 13:45	2× (suspension)	Report	3× (suspension)	Dammam Sports Hall, Dammam; Attendance: 250; Referees: Horáček, Novotný (CZE)

8 November 2023; 14:30	San Fernando HB (Argentina)	34–48	(Germany) Füchse Berlin	Dammam Sports Hall, Dammam; Attendance: 300; Referees: Belkhiri, Hamidi (ALG)
8 November 2023; 14:30	J. Fernández 7	(19–23)	Gidsel 13	Dammam Sports Hall, Dammam; Attendance: 300; Referees: Belkhiri, Hamidi (ALG)
8 November 2023; 14:30	1× (yellow card) 4× (suspension) 1× (red card)	Report	2× (yellow card) 3× (suspension)	Dammam Sports Hall, Dammam; Attendance: 300; Referees: Belkhiri, Hamidi (ALG)

9 November 2023; 14:30	Al-Kuwait SC	28–37	(Germany) Füchse Berlin	Dammam Sports Hall, Dammam; Attendance: 300; Referees: Kleven, Jørum (NOR)
9 November 2023; 14:30	Carol, Saleh 5	(16–18)	Gidsel 13	Dammam Sports Hall, Dammam; Attendance: 300; Referees: Kleven, Jørum (NOR)
9 November 2023; 14:30	2× (suspension)	Report	3× (suspension)	Dammam Sports Hall, Dammam; Attendance: 300; Referees: Kleven, Jørum (NOR)

=== Group C ===
Pos	Team	Pld	W	D	L	GF	GA	GD	Pts	Qualification
1	(Germany) SC Magdeburg	2	2	0	0	86	34	+52	4	Semifinals
2	(Saudi Arabia) Khaleej Club	2	1	0	1	68	55	+13	2	5–8th place semifinals
3	(Australia) University of Queensland	2	0	0	2	40	105	−65	0	9–12th place semifinals

Source: IHF
Rules for classification: 1) points; 2) head-to-head points; 3) head-to-head goal difference; 4) head-to-head number of goals scored; 5) goal difference.

7 November 2023; 19:30	SC Magdeburg (Germany)	29–20	(Saudi Arabia) Khaleej Club	Dammam Sports Hall, Dammam; Attendance: 3,000; Referees: Kurtagic, Wetterwik (SWE)
7 November 2023; 19:30	Musche 10	(15–10)	Nenadić 7	Dammam Sports Hall, Dammam; Attendance: 3,000; Referees: Kurtagic, Wetterwik (SWE)
7 November 2023; 19:30	2× (yellow card) 4× (suspension)	Report	2× (suspension)	Dammam Sports Hall, Dammam; Attendance: 3,000; Referees: Kurtagic, Wetterwik (SWE)

8 November 2023; 19:00	Khaleej Club (Saudi Arabia)	48–26	(Australia) University of Queensland	Dammam Sports Hall, Dammam; Attendance: 3,000; Referees: Gasmi, Gasmi (FRA)
8 November 2023; 19:00	Al-Traiki 8	(26–12)	Oleaga, Warrener 5	Dammam Sports Hall, Dammam; Attendance: 3,000; Referees: Gasmi, Gasmi (FRA)
8 November 2023; 19:00	1× (suspension)	Report	4× (suspension)	Dammam Sports Hall, Dammam; Attendance: 3,000; Referees: Gasmi, Gasmi (FRA)

9 November 2023; 16:45	SC Magdeburg (Germany)	57–14	(Australia) University of Queensland	Dammam Sports Hall, Dammam; Attendance: 450; Referees: Lenci, Grillo (ARG)
9 November 2023; 16:45	Pettersson 26	(28–7)	Gahan 4	Dammam Sports Hall, Dammam; Attendance: 450; Referees: Lenci, Grillo (ARG)
9 November 2023; 16:45	1× (yellow card) 1× (suspension)	Report	1× (suspension)	Dammam Sports Hall, Dammam; Attendance: 450; Referees: Lenci, Grillo (ARG)

=== Group D ===
Pos	Team	Pld	W	D	L	GF	GA	GD	Pts	Qualification
1	(Poland) Industria Kielce	2	2	0	0	76	49	+27	4	Semifinals
2	(Bahrain) Al-Najma	2	1	0	1	55	49	+6	2	5–8th place semifinals
3	(United States) San Francisco CalHeat	2	0	0	2	45	78	−33	0	9–12th place semifinals

Source: IHF
Rules for classification: 1) points; 2) head-to-head points; 3) head-to-head goal difference; 4) head-to-head number of goals scored; 5) goal difference.

7 November 2023; 11:30	Industria Kielce (Poland)	27–26	(Bahrain) Al-Najma	Dammam Sports Hall, Dammam; Attendance: 250; Referees: Grillo, Lenci (ARG)
7 November 2023; 11:30	Karalek 5	(17–13)	Ahmed 8	Dammam Sports Hall, Dammam; Attendance: 250; Referees: Grillo, Lenci (ARG)
7 November 2023; 11:30	5× (suspension)	Report	3× (suspension)	Dammam Sports Hall, Dammam; Attendance: 250; Referees: Grillo, Lenci (ARG)

8 November 2023; 12:15	Al-Najma (Bahrain)	29–22	(United States) San Francisco CalHeat	Dammam Sports Hall, Dammam; Attendance: 200; Referees: Marín, García (ESP)
8 November 2023; 12:15	Ahmed 9	(12–9)	Raff 7	Dammam Sports Hall, Dammam; Attendance: 200; Referees: Marín, García (ESP)
8 November 2023; 12:15	3× (suspension)	Report	2× (suspension)	Dammam Sports Hall, Dammam; Attendance: 200; Referees: Marín, García (ESP)

9 November 2023; 12:15	Industria Kielce (Poland)	49–23	(United States) San Francisco CalHeat	Dammam Sports Hall, Dammam; Attendance: 200; Referees: Kurtagic, Wetterwik (SWE)
9 November 2023; 12:15	Nahi 10	(22–12)	Raff 7	Dammam Sports Hall, Dammam; Attendance: 200; Referees: Kurtagic, Wetterwik (SWE)
9 November 2023; 12:15	2× (suspension)	Report	1× (yellow card) 2× (suspension)	Dammam Sports Hall, Dammam; Attendance: 200; Referees: Kurtagic, Wetterwik (SWE)

== Knockout stage ==
=== 9–12th place bracket ===
9–12th place semifinals
11 November
(Saudi Arabia) Al-Noor Club	31
(Argentina) San Fernando HB	29
11 November
(Australia) University of Queensland	22
(United States) San Francisco CalHeat	27

Ninth place game
12 November
(Saudi Arabia) Al-Noor Club	29
(United States) San Francisco CalHeat	24
Eleventh place game
12 November
(Argentina) San Fernando HB	39
(Australia) University of Queensland	28

==== 9–12th place semifinals ====
11 November 2023; 09:15	Al-Noor Club (Saudi Arabia)	31–29	(Argentina) San Fernando HB	Ministry of Sports Hall, Dammam; Attendance: 250; Referees: Kurtagic, Wetterwik (SWE)
11 November 2023; 09:15	Gadža 10	(14–15)	F. Fernández, J. Fernández 5	Ministry of Sports Hall, Dammam; Attendance: 250; Referees: Kurtagic, Wetterwik (SWE)
11 November 2023; 09:15	2× (suspension) 1× (red card)	Report	5× (suspension)	Ministry of Sports Hall, Dammam; Attendance: 250; Referees: Kurtagic, Wetterwik (SWE)

11 November 2023; 11:15	University of Queensland (Australia)	22–27	(United States) San Francisco CalHeat	Ministry of Sports Hall, Dammam; Attendance: 300; Referees: Bíró, Kiss (HUN)
11 November 2023; 11:15	Warrener 5	(10–15)	Raff 7	Ministry of Sports Hall, Dammam; Attendance: 300; Referees: Bíró, Kiss (HUN)
11 November 2023; 11:15	4× (suspension)	Report	3× (suspension)	Ministry of Sports Hall, Dammam; Attendance: 300; Referees: Bíró, Kiss (HUN)

==== Eleventh place game ====
12 November 2023; 09:15	San Fernando HB (Argentina)	39–28	(Australia) University of Queensland	Ministry of Sports Hall, Dammam; Attendance: 300; Referees: Gasmi, Gasmi (FRA)
12 November 2023; 09:15	Cánepa 11	(22–11)	Gahan, Oleaga 7	Ministry of Sports Hall, Dammam; Attendance: 300; Referees: Gasmi, Gasmi (FRA)
12 November 2023; 09:15	3× (suspension)	Report	4× (suspension)	Ministry of Sports Hall, Dammam; Attendance: 300; Referees: Gasmi, Gasmi (FRA)

==== Ninth place game ====
12 November 2023; 11:15	Al-Noor Club (Saudi Arabia)	29–24	(United States) San Francisco CalHeat	Ministry of Sports Hall, Dammam; Attendance: 500; Referees: Belkhiri, Hamidi (ALG)
12 November 2023; 11:15	Al-Agry 8	(13–12)	Assfalg, Donlin 5	Ministry of Sports Hall, Dammam; Attendance: 500; Referees: Belkhiri, Hamidi (ALG)
12 November 2023; 11:15	2× (suspension)	Report	2× (suspension)	Ministry of Sports Hall, Dammam; Attendance: 500; Referees: Belkhiri, Hamidi (ALG)

=== 5–8th place bracket ===
5–8th place semifinals
11 November
(Egypt) Al Ahly	35
Al-Kuwait SC	25
11 November
(Saudi Arabia) Khaleej Club	27
(Bahrain) Al-Najma	24

Fifth place game
12 November
(Egypt) Al Ahly (Pen.)	30 (5)
(Saudi Arabia) Khaleej Club	30 (4)
Seventh place game
12 November
Al-Kuwait SC	29
(Bahrain) Al-Najma	24

==== 5–8th place semifinals ====
11 November 2023; 13:15	Al Ahly (Egypt)	35–25	Al-Kuwait SC	Ministry of Sports Hall, Dammam; Attendance: 800; Referees: Gasmi, Gasmi (FRA)
11 November 2023; 13:15	Hesham, Ramadan 6	(16–12)	Carol 9	Ministry of Sports Hall, Dammam; Attendance: 800; Referees: Gasmi, Gasmi (FRA)
11 November 2023; 13:15	3× (suspension)	Report	1× (yellow card) 4× (suspension) 1× (red card)	Ministry of Sports Hall, Dammam; Attendance: 800; Referees: Gasmi, Gasmi (FRA)

11 November 2023; 15:15	Khaleej Club (Saudi Arabia)	27–24	(Bahrain) Al-Najma	Ministry of Sports Hall, Dammam; Attendance: 2,700; Referees: Marín, García (ESP)
11 November 2023; 15:15	Al-Salem 5	(14–10)	Ahmed 7	Ministry of Sports Hall, Dammam; Attendance: 2,700; Referees: Marín, García (ESP)
11 November 2023; 15:15	2× (yellow card) 5× (suspension)	Report	1× (suspension) 1× (red card)	Ministry of Sports Hall, Dammam; Attendance: 2,700; Referees: Marín, García (ESP)

==== Seventh place game ====
12 November 2023; 13:15	Al-Kuwait SC	29–24	(Bahrain) Al-Najma	Ministry of Sports Hall, Dammam; Attendance: 500; Referees: Lenci, Grillo (ARG)
12 November 2023; 13:15	Carol 9	(15–11)	Madan 5	Ministry of Sports Hall, Dammam; Attendance: 500; Referees: Lenci, Grillo (ARG)
12 November 2023; 13:15	1× (suspension)	Report	1× (yellow card) 2× (suspension)	Ministry of Sports Hall, Dammam; Attendance: 500; Referees: Lenci, Grillo (ARG)

==== Fifth place game ====
12 November 2023
15:15
Al Ahly (Egypt)
35–34
(Saudi Arabia) Khaleej Club
Ministry of Sports Hall, Dammam
Attendance: 1,500
Referees: Kurtagic, Wetterwik (SWE)
Adel, Ramadan 6
(14–16)
Nenadić 10
1× (yellow card) 6× (suspension)
Report
1× (yellow card) 7× (suspension)

FT: 30–30 Pen: 5–4

=== Championship bracket ===
Semi-finals
11 November
(Spain) Barcelona	34
(Germany) Füchse Berlin (ET)	35
11 November
(Germany) SC Magdeburg	28
(Poland) Industria Kielce	24

Final
12 November
(Germany) Füchse Berlin	32
(Germany) SC Magdeburg (ET)	34
Third place
12 November
(Spain) Barcelona	33
(Poland) Industria Kielce	30

==== Semifinals ====
11 November 2023
17:30
Barcelona (Spain)
34–35 (ET)
(Germany) Füchse Berlin
Ministry of Sports Hall, Dammam
Attendance: 950
Referees: Kleven, Jørum (NOR)
Frade, N’Guessan 6
(16–16)
Gidsel 10
1× (yellow card) 5× (suspension)
Report
2× (yellow card) 6× (suspension)

FT: 29–29 ET: 5–6

11 November 2023; 20:15	SC Magdeburg (Germany)	28–24	(Poland) Industria Kielce	Ministry of Sports Hall, Dammam; Attendance: 850; Referees: Horáček, Novotný (CZE)
11 November 2023; 20:15	Magnússon 6	(15–14)	Nahi 6	Ministry of Sports Hall, Dammam; Attendance: 850; Referees: Horáček, Novotný (CZE)
11 November 2023; 20:15	1× (yellow card) 1× (suspension)	Report	4× (suspension)	Ministry of Sports Hall, Dammam; Attendance: 850; Referees: Horáček, Novotný (CZE)

==== Third place game ====
12 November 2023; 17:30	Barcelona (Spain)	33–30	(Poland) Industria Kielce	Ministry of Sports Hall, Dammam; Attendance: 750; Referees: Bíró, Kiss (HUN)
12 November 2023; 17:30	Mem 8	(14–16)	Sićko 6	Ministry of Sports Hall, Dammam; Attendance: 750; Referees: Bíró, Kiss (HUN)
12 November 2023; 17:30	1× (yellow card) 3× (suspension)	Report	1× (yellow card) 3× (suspension) 1× (red card)	Ministry of Sports Hall, Dammam; Attendance: 750; Referees: Bíró, Kiss (HUN)

==== Final ====
12 November 2023
20:15
Füchse Berlin (Germany)
32–34 (ET)
(Germany) SC Magdeburg
Ministry of Sports Hall, Dammam
Attendance: 1,800
Referees: Marín, García (ESP)
Gidsel 9
(16–13)
Lagergren, Smárason 7
2× (yellow card) 5× (suspension)
Report
2× (yellow card) 4× (suspension)

FT: 29–29 ET: 3–5

== Final ranking ==
Rank	Team
1st place, gold medalist(s)	(Germany) SC Magdeburg
2nd place, silver medalist(s)	(Germany) Füchse Berlin
3rd place, bronze medalist(s)	(Spain) Barcelona
4	(Poland) Industria Kielce
5	(Egypt) Al Ahly
6	(Saudi Arabia) Khaleej Club
7	Al-Kuwait SC
8	(Bahrain) Al-Najma
9	(Saudi Arabia) Al-Noor Club
10	(United States) San Francisco CalHeat
11	(Argentina) San Fernando HB
12	(Australia) University of Queensland

== All-star Team ==
The All-star Team was announced on 12 November 2023.

Position	Player
Goalkeeper	(Serbia) Dejan Milosavljev
Right wing	(Denmark) Hans Lindberg
Right back	(Iceland) Ómar Ingi Magnússon
Centre back	(Iceland) Janus Daði Smárason
Left back	(Denmark) Lasse Andersson
Left wing	(France) Dylan Nahi
Pivot	(Portugal) Luís Frade
MVP	(Denmark) Mathias Gidsel
