= 2015 Pan American Men's Club Handball Championship =

Tournament details
- Host country: Brazil
- Venue(s): 1 (in 1 host city)
- Dates: 20-24 may
- Teams: 5 (from 1 confederation)

Final positions
- Champions: (Brazil) Handebol Taubaté (3rd title)
- Runner-up: (Brazil) EC Pinheiros
- Third place: (Argentina) River Plate
- Fourth place: (Argentina) SAG Villa Ballester

Tournament statistics
- Matches played: 10
- Goals scored: 539 (53.9 per match)
- Top scorer(s): (Argentina) Julián Souto Cueto (24 goals)

Awards
- Best player: (Argentina) Julián Souto Cueto

The 2015 Pan American Men's Club Handball Championship took place in Taubaté 20-24 may. It acts as the Pan American qualifying tournament for the 2015 IHF Super Globe.

== Teams ==
- (Argentina) River Plate
- (Argentina) SAG Villa Ballester
- (Brazil) Handebol Taubaté
- (Brazil) EC Pinheiros
- (Chile) Luterano de Valparaíso

== Results ==
Team	Pld	W	D	L	GF	GA	GD	Pts
(Brazil) Handebol Taubaté	4	4	0	0	133	80	+53	8
(Brazil) EC Pinheiros	4	2	1	1	107	93	+14	5
(Argentina) River Plate	4	2	0	2	103	108	−5	4
(Argentina) SAG Villa Ballester	4	1	1	2	101	112	−11	3
(Chile) Luterano de Valparaíso	4	0	0	4	95	146	−51	0

May 20; 17:00	SAG Villa Ballester (Argentina)	25–28	(Argentina) River Plate	Ginasio EMECAL, Taubaté
May 20; 17:00	Souto, Cánepa 5	(15–13)	Vazquez 9	Ginasio EMECAL, Taubaté
May 20; 17:00	3× (yellow card) 1× (suspension)	Report	3× (yellow card) 7× (suspension)	Ginasio EMECAL, Taubaté

May 20; 20:00	Handebol Taubaté (Brazil)	40–17	(Chile) Luterano de Valparaíso	Ginasio EMECAL, Taubaté
May 20; 20:00	three players with 5	(22–10)	Caniu 4	Ginasio EMECAL, Taubaté
May 20; 20:00	3× (yellow card) 4× (suspension)	Report	3× (yellow card) 3× (suspension)	Ginasio EMECAL, Taubaté

May 21; 17:00	Luterano de Valparaíso (Chile)	24–41	(Brazil) EC Pinheiros	Ginasio EMECAL, Taubaté
May 21; 17:00	Veliz, Chacana 5	(11–18)	Silva 9	Ginasio EMECAL, Taubaté
May 21; 17:00	3× (yellow card) 3× (suspension)	Report	3× (yellow card) 4× (suspension)	Ginasio EMECAL, Taubaté

May 21; 20:00	River Plate (Argentina)	21–29	(Brazil) Handebol Taubaté	Ginasio EMECAL, Taubaté
May 21; 20:00	Vazquez 7	(12–12)	Teixeira 5	Ginasio EMECAL, Taubaté
May 21; 20:00	3× (yellow card) 2× (suspension)	Report	1× (yellow card) 5× (suspension)	Ginasio EMECAL, Taubaté

May 22	EC Pinheiros (Brazil)	19–19	(Argentina) SAG Villa Ballester	Ginasio EMECAL, Taubaté
May 22	Souto 6	(8–10)	Canepa 5	Ginasio EMECAL, Taubaté
May 22	3× (yellow card) 5× (suspension) 1× (red card)	Report	3× (yellow card) 8× (suspension)	Ginasio EMECAL, Taubaté

May 22	Luterano de Valparaíso (Chile)	27–30	(Argentina) River Plate	Ginasio EMECAL, Taubaté
May 22	Frelijj 10	(16–17)	Ojea 5	Ginasio EMECAL, Taubaté
May 22	3× (yellow card) 5× (suspension)	Report	2× (yellow card) 5× (suspension)	Ginasio EMECAL, Taubaté

May 23; 13:00	EC Pinheiros (Brazil)	27–24	(Argentina) River Plate	Ginasio EMECAL, Taubaté
May 23; 13:00	Langaro 8	(10–10)	Ojea 4	Ginasio EMECAL, Taubaté
May 23; 13:00	3× (yellow card) 2× (suspension)	Report	2× (yellow card) 4× (suspension)	Ginasio EMECAL, Taubaté

May 23; 16:00	SAG Villa Ballester (Argentina)	22–38	(Brazil) Handebol Taubaté	Ginasio EMECAL, Taubaté
May 23; 16:00	Filipuzzi 4	(10–31)	Pacheco 10	Ginasio EMECAL, Taubaté
May 23; 16:00	2× (yellow card) 4× (suspension)	Report	2× (yellow card) 6× (suspension)	Ginasio EMECAL, Taubaté

May 24; 13:00	SAG Villa Ballester (Argentina)	35–27	(Chile) Luterano de Valparaíso	Ginasio EMECAL, Taubaté
May 24; 13:00	Kogovsek 11	(17–16)	Chacana 8	Ginasio EMECAL, Taubaté
May 24; 13:00	3× (yellow card) 4× (suspension)	Report	3× (yellow card) 7× (suspension)	Ginasio EMECAL, Taubaté

May 24; 16:00	Handebol Taubaté (Brazil)	26–20	(Brazil) EC Pinheiros	Ginasio EMECAL, Taubaté
May 24; 16:00	Teixeira 6	(14–10)	Souto 9	Ginasio EMECAL, Taubaté
May 24; 16:00	2× (yellow card) 3× (suspension)	Report	3× (yellow card) 3× (suspension)	Ginasio EMECAL, Taubaté

== Final standing ==
Rank	Team
Gold medal	(Brazil) Handebol Taubaté
Silver medal	(Brazil) EC Pinheiros
Bronze medal	(Argentina) River Plate
4	(Argentina) SAG Villa Ballester
5	(Chile) Luterano de Valparaíso

Team qualified to the 2015 IHF Super Globe
