= Bryan Monte =

Brazilian handball player (born 2003)

Personal information
- Full name: Hugo Bryan Monte dos Santos
- Born: 6 April 2003 (age 23) São João de Meriti, Brazil
- Height: 1.93 m (6 ft 4 in)

Sport
- Sport: Handball
- Position: Left back
- Current club: kuwait club Handball
- Number: 26

Senior clubs
- Years: Team
- –2023: EC Pinheiros
- 2023–: Montpellier Handball
National team
Years	Team	Apps	(Gls)
–	Brazil	10	(21)
Medal record
Pan American Games
Silver medal – second place	2023 Santiago	Team
South and Central American Championship
Gold medal – first place	2024 Argentina
Silver medal – second place	2026 Paraguay
South and Central American Junior Championship
Gold medal – first place	2022 Argentina
- Updated on 5 May 2024

Hugo Bryan Monte dos Santos better known as Bryan Monte (born 6 April 2003) is a Brazilian handball player for Montpellier Handball and the Brazilian national team.

== Career ==
Monte started at EC Pinheiros in Brazil. Here he won the South and Central American Men's Club Handball Championship in 2021. In 2022 he represented the club at the 2023 IHF Super Globe.

In 2023 he signed for Montpellier Handball.

With the national team he played at the 2023 World Men's Handball Championship, where they finished 17th. Monte scored 17 goals in 6 matches.

At the 2023 Pan American Games he won silver medals with the Brazilian team, finishing behind Argentina. At the 2024 South and Central American Men's Handball Championship he won gold medals.

Just before the 2025 World Men's Handball Championship Monte was injured during a test match against Germany. He did however recover in order to play at the tournament. He could therefore help his team when Brazil reached the quarterfinal of the World Championship for the first time, knocking out Sweden, Norway and Spain. They lost the quarterfinal to Denmark.
