= 2017 Pan American Men's Club Handball Championship =

Tournament details
- Host country: Argentina
- Venue(s): 1 (in 1 host city)
- Dates: 24–28 May
- Teams: 6 (from 1 confederation)

Final positions
- Champions: (Brazil) EC Pinheiros (2nd title)
- Runners-up: (Brazil) Handebol Taubaté
- Third place: (Argentina) UNLu
- Fourth place: (Argentina) SAG Villa Ballester

Tournament statistics
- Matches played: 15
- Goals scored: 779 (51.93 per match)
- Top scorer(s): (Argentina) Federico Pizarro (39 goals)

The 2017 Pan American Men's Club Handball Championship the X edition of this tournament took place in Villa Ballester, Buenos Aires, Argentina from 24 to 28 May 2017. It acts as a qualifying tournament for the 2017 IHF Super Globe.

== Participating teams ==
- (Argentina) SAG Villa Ballester
- (Argentina) UNLu
- (Brazil) Handebol Taubaté
- (Brazil) EC Pinheiros
- (Chile) Ovalle Balonmano
- (Uruguay) Colegio Alemán

== Results ==
Team	Pld	W	D	L	GF	GA	GD	Pts
(Brazil) EC Pinheiros	5	5	0	0	159	102	57	10
(Brazil) Handebol Taubaté	5	4	0	1	150	102	48	8
(Argentina) UNLu	5	3	0	2	132	122	10	6
(Argentina) SAG Villa Ballester	5	2	0	3	145	140	5	4
(Chile) Ovalle Balonmano	5	1	0	4	99	158	–59	2
(Uruguay) Colegio Alemán	5	0	0	5	94	155	–61	0

== Round robin ==
All times are local (UTC-03:00).

May 24; 15:00	Ovalle Balonmano (Chile)	15–32	(Brazil) Handebol Taubaté	Estadio Mundialista SAG, Villa Ballester; Attendance: 500; Referees: Gonzalez, Prieto
May 24; 15:00	Mihovilovic 4	(7–16)	Lobato 6	Estadio Mundialista SAG, Villa Ballester; Attendance: 500; Referees: Gonzalez, Prieto
May 24; 15:00	2× (yellow card) 3× (suspension)	Report	1× (yellow card) 6× (suspension) 1× (red card)	Estadio Mundialista SAG, Villa Ballester; Attendance: 500; Referees: Gonzalez, Prieto

May 24; 17:00	Colegio Alemán (Uruguay)	19–27	(Argentina) UNLu	Estadio Mundialista SAG, Villa Ballester; Referees: Rosa, Braga
May 24; 17:00	Brum 5	(7–18)	Pizarro 10	Estadio Mundialista SAG, Villa Ballester; Referees: Rosa, Braga
May 24; 17:00	2× (yellow card) 2× (suspension)	Report	2× (yellow card) 5× (suspension)	Estadio Mundialista SAG, Villa Ballester; Referees: Rosa, Braga

May 24; 19:00	SAG Villa Ballester (Argentina)	28–31	(Brazil) EC Pinheiros	Estadio Mundialista SAG, Villa Ballester; Attendance: 2000; Referees: Lenci, Grillo
May 24; 19:00	Kogovseck 9	(12–15)	Hackbarth 6	Estadio Mundialista SAG, Villa Ballester; Attendance: 2000; Referees: Lenci, Grillo
May 24; 19:00	4× (yellow card) 3× (suspension)	Report	2× (yellow card) 3× (suspension) 1× (red card)	Estadio Mundialista SAG, Villa Ballester; Attendance: 2000; Referees: Lenci, Grillo

May 25; 15:00	UNLu (Argentina)	32–19	(Chile) Ovalle Balonmano	Estadio Mundialista SAG, Villa Ballester; Attendance: 2000; Referees: Rosa, Braga
May 25; 15:00	Pizarro 7	(18–10)	Testa, Oyarzún 4	Estadio Mundialista SAG, Villa Ballester; Attendance: 2000; Referees: Rosa, Braga
May 25; 15:00	3× (yellow card) 4× (suspension)	Report	1× (yellow card) 6× (suspension) 1× (red card)	Estadio Mundialista SAG, Villa Ballester; Attendance: 2000; Referees: Rosa, Braga

May 25; 17:00	EC Pinheiros (Brazil)	36–18	(Uruguay) Colegio Alemán	Estadio Mundialista SAG, Villa Ballester; Referees: Marina, Acuña
May 25; 17:00	Hubner 7	(17–8)	Abdala 5	Estadio Mundialista SAG, Villa Ballester; Referees: Marina, Acuña
May 25; 17:00	2× (yellow card) 1× (suspension)	Report	3× (yellow card) 2× (suspension)	Estadio Mundialista SAG, Villa Ballester; Referees: Marina, Acuña

May 25; 19:00	SAG Villa Ballester (Argentina)	18–35	(Brazil) Handebol Taubaté	Estadio Mundialista SAG, Villa Ballester; Referees: Gonzalez, Prieto
May 25; 19:00	six players 2	(9–18)	Novais 7	Estadio Mundialista SAG, Villa Ballester; Referees: Gonzalez, Prieto
May 25; 19:00	3× (yellow card) 3× (suspension)	Report	2× (suspension)	Estadio Mundialista SAG, Villa Ballester; Referees: Gonzalez, Prieto

May 26; 14:45	Handebol Taubaté (Brazil)	33–18	(Uruguay) Colegio Alemán	Estadio Mundialista SAG, Villa Ballester
May 26; 14:45	Lobato, Freitas 6	Report	Brum, Abdala 5	Estadio Mundialista SAG, Villa Ballester
May 26; 14:45	1× (yellow card) 1× (suspension)		3× (suspension)	Estadio Mundialista SAG, Villa Ballester

May 26; 17:00	SAG Villa Ballester (Argentina)	36–26	(Chile) Ovalle Balonmano	Estadio Mundialista SAG, Villa Ballester
May 26; 17:00	Corning, Werner 5	Report	Hernandes 9	Estadio Mundialista SAG, Villa Ballester
May 26; 17:00	3× (yellow card) 6× (suspension)		2× (yellow card) 5× (suspension)	Estadio Mundialista SAG, Villa Ballester

May 26; 19:00	EC Pinheiros (Brazil)	30–21	(Argentina) UNLu	Estadio Mundialista SAG, Villa Ballester; Referees: Lenci, Grillo
May 26; 19:00	Dutra 10	(14–12)	Pizarro 7	Estadio Mundialista SAG, Villa Ballester; Referees: Lenci, Grillo
May 26; 19:00	3× (suspension)	Report	3× (yellow card) 2× (suspension)	Estadio Mundialista SAG, Villa Ballester; Referees: Lenci, Grillo

May 27; 15:45	EC Pinheiros (Brazil)	34–15	(Chile) Ovalle Balonmano	Estadio Mundialista SAG, Villa Ballester; Referees: Rosa, Braga
May 27; 15:45	Santos 10	(19–6)	Rubio 4	Estadio Mundialista SAG, Villa Ballester; Referees: Rosa, Braga
May 27; 15:45	3× (yellow card) 3× (suspension)	Report	2× (yellow card) 2× (suspension) 1× (red card)	Estadio Mundialista SAG, Villa Ballester; Referees: Rosa, Braga

May 27; 18:00	Colegio Alemán (Uruguay)	18–36	(Argentina) SAG Villa Ballester	Estadio Mundialista SAG, Villa Ballester; Referees: Marina, Acuña
May 27; 18:00	Morandeira 7	(7–22)	Kogovseck 6	Estadio Mundialista SAG, Villa Ballester; Referees: Marina, Acuña
May 27; 18:00	1× (yellow card) 1× (suspension)	Report	2× (yellow card)	Estadio Mundialista SAG, Villa Ballester; Referees: Marina, Acuña

May 27; 20:00	UNLu (Argentina)	22–27	(Brazil) Handebol Taubaté	Estadio Mundialista SAG, Villa Ballester
May 27; 20:00	Pizarro 7	Report	Freitas 5	Estadio Mundialista SAG, Villa Ballester
May 27; 20:00	3× (yellow card) 3× (suspension)		2× (yellow card) 2× (suspension)	Estadio Mundialista SAG, Villa Ballester

May 28; 10:45	Ovalle Balonmano (Chile)	23–21	(Uruguay) Colegio Alemán	Estadio Mundialista SAG, Villa Ballester; Referees: Prieto, Gonzalez
May 28; 10:45	three players 4	(12–9)	Velazco 9	Estadio Mundialista SAG, Villa Ballester; Referees: Prieto, Gonzalez
May 28; 10:45	1× (yellow card) 4× (suspension)	Report	2× (yellow card) 3× (suspension)	Estadio Mundialista SAG, Villa Ballester; Referees: Prieto, Gonzalez

May 28; 13:00	UNLu (Argentina)	30–27	(Argentina) SAG Villa Ballester	Estadio Mundialista SAG, Villa Ballester; Referees: Marina. Acuña
May 28; 13:00	Pizarro 8	(16–12)	Canepa 7	Estadio Mundialista SAG, Villa Ballester; Referees: Marina. Acuña
May 28; 13:00	1× (yellow card) 3× (suspension) 1× (red card)	Report	1× (yellow card) 2× (suspension)	Estadio Mundialista SAG, Villa Ballester; Referees: Marina. Acuña

May 28; 15:00	EC Pinheiros (Brazil)	28–20	(Brazil) Handebol Taubaté	Estadio Mundialista SAG, Villa Ballester; Attendance: 3000; Referees: Lenci, Grillo
May 28; 15:00	Dutra 8	(11–8)	Oliveira 5	Estadio Mundialista SAG, Villa Ballester; Attendance: 3000; Referees: Lenci, Grillo
May 28; 15:00	3× (yellow card)	Report	2× (yellow card) 3× (suspension) 1× (red card)	Estadio Mundialista SAG, Villa Ballester; Attendance: 3000; Referees: Lenci, Grillo

== Final standing ==
Rank	Team
Gold medal	(Brazil) EC Pinheiros
Silver medal	(Brazil) Handebol Taubaté
Bronze medal	(Argentina) UNLu
4	(Argentina) SAG Villa Ballester
5	(Chile) Ovalle Balonmano
6	(Uruguay) Colegio Alemán

Team qualified to the 2017 IHF Super Globe

== Awards ==
All-star team

- Goalkeeper: (Brazil) Marcos Paulo Santos
- Right Wing: (Argentina) Andrés Kogovsek
- Right Back: (Argentina) Federico Pizarro
- Playmaker: (Brazil) André Silva
- Left Back: (Brazil) Leonardo Dutra
- Left Wing: (Brazil) André Soares
- Pivot: (Brazil) Vinícius Teixeira
- MVP: (Argentina) Federico Pizarro
