= Marcão (handballer) =

Brazilian handball player (born 1976)

Personal information
- Full name: Marcos Paulo dos Santos
- Nationality: Brazil
- Born: 25 May 1976 (age 50) Santo André, Brazil
- Height: 1.84 m (6 ft 0 in)

Sport
- Sport: Handball
- Position: goalkeeper

Senior clubs
- Years: Team
- ?-?: EC Pinheiros
National team
- Years: Team
- ?-?: Brazil
Medal record
Men's handball
Representing Brazil
Pan American Games
Silver medal – second place	1999 Winnipeg	Team
Gold medal – first place	2003 Santo Domingo	Team
Silver medal – second place	2011 Guadalajara	Team

Marcos Paulo dos Santos (born 25 May 1976), known as Marcão, is a Brazilian male handball player. He was a member of the Brazil men's national handball team, playing as a goalkeeper. He was a part of the team at the 2004 Summer Olympics. On club level he played for Metodista in Brazil. His brother Maik Ferreira dos Santos was also an international handball player who competed at the 2008 Summer Olympics.

== Titles ==
- Pan American Men's Club Handball Championship:
  - 2017
- South and Central American Men's Club Handball Championship:
  - 2021

== Individual awards and achievements ==
=== Best Goalkeeper ===
- Liga Nacional de Handebol 2016
- 2017 Pan American Men's Club Handball Championship
