= 2022 South and Central American Men's Club Handball Championship =

Tournament details
- Host country: Argentina
- Venue: 1 (in 1 host city)
- Dates: 24 – 28 May
- Teams: 9 (from 1 confederation)

Final positions
- Champions: (Brazil) Handebol Taubaté (2nd title)
- Runners-up: (Brazil) EC Pinheiros
- Third place: (Argentina) San Fernando HB
- Fourth place: (Argentina) SAG Villa Ballester

Tournament statistics
- Matches played: 18
- Goals scored: 898 (49.89 per match)
- Attendance: 13,493 (750 per match)
- Top scorer: Federico Gastón Fernández (27 goals)

The 2022 South and Central American Men's Club Handball Championship the 3rd edition of this tournament was held in Villa Ballester, Argentina from 24 to 28 May 2022. It acted as a qualifying tournament for the 2022 IHF Men's Super Globe.

== Participating teams ==
- (Argentina) San Fernando HB
- (Argentina) SAG Villa Ballester
- (Argentina) Municipal of Maipú
- (Brazil) Handebol Taubaté
- (Brazil) EC Pinheiros
- (Chile) USAB handball
- (Chile) Ovalle Handball
- (Paraguay) Club Olimpia
- (Uruguay) German School of Montevideo

== Preliminary round ==
All times are local (UTC–3).

=== Group A ===
Pos	Team	Pld	W	D	L	GF	GA	GD	Pts	Qualification
1	(Brazil) Handebol Taubaté	2	2	0	0	53	42	+11	4	Semifinals
2	(Argentina) SAG Villa Ballester (H)	2	1	0	1	53	48	+5	2	Semifinals
3	(Chile) Ovalle Balonmano	2	0	0	2	43	59	−16	0	5–9th place semifinals

Source: HSCA
(H) Hosts

24 May; 16:30	Handebol Taubaté (Brazil)	28–20	(Chile) Ovalle Balonmano	SAG Villa Ballester Gym, Villa Ballester; Attendance: 133; Referees: Burgos & Delgado (ARG)
24 May; 16:30	Torriani 7	(10–13)	Aranguiz 6	SAG Villa Ballester Gym, Villa Ballester; Attendance: 133; Referees: Burgos & Delgado (ARG)
24 May; 16:30	1× (yellow card) 6× (suspension)	Report	4× (suspension)	SAG Villa Ballester Gym, Villa Ballester; Attendance: 133; Referees: Burgos & Delgado (ARG)

25 May; 20:30	Ovalle Balonmano (Chile)	23–31	(Argentina) SAG Villa Ballester	SAG Villa Ballester Gym, Villa Ballester; Attendance: 1500; Referees: Araijo & Perdomo (URU)
25 May; 20:30	Albanac & Valenzuela 5	(11–12)	Scovenna & Soto 7	SAG Villa Ballester Gym, Villa Ballester; Attendance: 1500; Referees: Araijo & Perdomo (URU)
25 May; 20:30	1× (yellow card) 6× (suspension) 1× (red card)	Report	1× (yellow card) 6× (suspension)	SAG Villa Ballester Gym, Villa Ballester; Attendance: 1500; Referees: Araijo & Perdomo (URU)

26 May; 20:30	Handebol Taubaté (Brazil)	25–22	(Argentina) SAG Villa Ballester	SAG Villa Ballester Gym, Villa Ballester; Attendance: 1500; Referees: Lemes & Sosa (URU)
26 May; 20:30	Barros 4	(17–12)	Scovenna 8	SAG Villa Ballester Gym, Villa Ballester; Attendance: 1500; Referees: Lemes & Sosa (URU)
26 May; 20:30	1× (yellow card) 4× (suspension)	Report	1× (yellow card) 4× (suspension)	SAG Villa Ballester Gym, Villa Ballester; Attendance: 1500; Referees: Lemes & Sosa (URU)

=== Group B ===
Pos	Team	Pld	W	D	L	GF	GA	GD	Pts	Qualification
1	(Brazil) EC Pinheiros	2	2	0	0	74	33	+41	4	Semifinals
2	(Argentina) Municipal of Maipú	2	1	0	1	50	52	−2	2	5–9th place semifinals
3	(Chile) USAB handball	2	0	0	2	30	69	−39	0	5–9th place quarterfinal

Source: HSCA

24 May; 18:30	EC Pinheiros (Brazil)	35–20	(Argentina) Municipal of Maipú	SAG Villa Ballester Gym, Villa Ballester; Attendance: 300; Referees: Lemes & Sosa (URU)
24 May; 18:30	dos Reis 5	(22–8)	Heredia 5	SAG Villa Ballester Gym, Villa Ballester; Attendance: 300; Referees: Lemes & Sosa (URU)
24 May; 18:30	1× (yellow card) 3× (suspension)	Report	1× (suspension)	SAG Villa Ballester Gym, Villa Ballester; Attendance: 300; Referees: Lemes & Sosa (URU)

25 May; 16:30	USAB handball (Chile)	17–30	(Argentina) Municipal of Maipú	SAG Villa Ballester Gym, Villa Ballester; Attendance: 210; Referees: Godoy & Magalhaes (BRA)
25 May; 16:30	Gomez 6	(7–10)	Faraz 11	SAG Villa Ballester Gym, Villa Ballester; Attendance: 210; Referees: Godoy & Magalhaes (BRA)
25 May; 16:30	1× (yellow card) 3× (suspension)	Report	3× (yellow card) 1× (suspension)	SAG Villa Ballester Gym, Villa Ballester; Attendance: 210; Referees: Godoy & Magalhaes (BRA)

26 May; 16:30	EC Pinheiros (Brazil)	39–13	(Chile) USAB handball	SAG Villa Ballester Gym, Villa Ballester; Attendance: 200; Referees: Burgos & Delgado (ARG)
26 May; 16:30	Silva 7	(22–7)	Gomez & Cortes 3	SAG Villa Ballester Gym, Villa Ballester; Attendance: 200; Referees: Burgos & Delgado (ARG)
26 May; 16:30	4× (suspension)	Report	4× (suspension) 1× (red card)	SAG Villa Ballester Gym, Villa Ballester; Attendance: 200; Referees: Burgos & Delgado (ARG)

=== Group C ===
Pos	Team	Pld	W	D	L	GF	GA	GD	Pts	Qualification
1	(Argentina) San Fernando HB	2	2	0	0	64	37	+27	4	Semifinals
2	(Uruguay) German School of Montevideo	2	1	0	1	50	46	+4	2	5–9th place semifinals
3	(Paraguay) Club Olimpia	2	0	0	2	43	74	−31	0	5–9th place quarterfinal

Source: HSCA

24 May; 20:30	San Fernando HB (Argentina)	41–20	(Paraguay) Club Olimpia	SAG Villa Ballester Gym, Villa Ballester; Attendance: 500; Referees: Godoy & Magalhaes (BRA)
24 May; 20:30	Farias 7	(16–9)	Salinas 5	SAG Villa Ballester Gym, Villa Ballester; Attendance: 500; Referees: Godoy & Magalhaes (BRA)
24 May; 20:30	3× (suspension)	Report	1× (yellow card) 3× (suspension)	SAG Villa Ballester Gym, Villa Ballester; Attendance: 500; Referees: Godoy & Magalhaes (BRA)

25 May; 18:30	German School of Montevideo (Uruguay)	33–23	(Paraguay) Club Olimpia	SAG Villa Ballester Gym, Villa Ballester; Attendance: 400; Referees: Sebastian Lenci & Lopez-Grillo (ARG)
25 May; 18:30	Echeverry 6	(11–13)	Mendoza 6	SAG Villa Ballester Gym, Villa Ballester; Attendance: 400; Referees: Sebastian Lenci & Lopez-Grillo (ARG)
25 May; 18:30	2× (yellow card) 2× (suspension)	Report	1× (yellow card) 4× (suspension)	SAG Villa Ballester Gym, Villa Ballester; Attendance: 400; Referees: Sebastian Lenci & Lopez-Grillo (ARG)

26 May; 18:30	San Fernando HB (Argentina)	23–17	(Uruguay) German School of Montevideo	SAG Villa Ballester Gym, Villa Ballester; Attendance: 350; Referees: Sebastian Lenci & Lopez-Grillo (ARG)
26 May; 18:30	Martinez 7	(8–6)	Velazco 6	SAG Villa Ballester Gym, Villa Ballester; Attendance: 350; Referees: Sebastian Lenci & Lopez-Grillo (ARG)
26 May; 18:30	2× (yellow card) 3× (suspension)	Report	3× (yellow card) 4× (suspension)	SAG Villa Ballester Gym, Villa Ballester; Attendance: 350; Referees: Sebastian Lenci & Lopez-Grillo (ARG)

== Knockout stage ==
=== Bracket ===
Semifinals
A1	(Brazil) Handebol Taubaté	27
C1	(Argentina) San Fernando HB	21
B1	(Brazil) EC Pinheiros	28
A2	(Argentina) SAG Villa Ballester	23

Finals
A1	(Brazil) Handebol Taubaté	27
B1	(Brazil) EC Pinheiros	20
Third place
C1	(Argentina) San Fernando HB	28
A2	(Argentina) SAG Villa Ballester	25

5–9th place quarterfinal
C3	(Paraguay) Club Olimpia	24
B3	(Chile) USAB handball	29

5–9th place semifinals
C2	(Uruguay) German School	35
B3	(Chile) USAB handball	18
A3	(Chile) Ovalle Balonmano	21
B2	(Argentina) Municipal of Maipú	25

Fifth place
C2	(Uruguay) German School	26
B2	(Argentina) Municipal of Maipú	20
Seventh place
B3	(Chile) USAB handball	19
A3	(Chile) Ovalle Balonmano	22

=== 5–9th place quarterfinal ===
27 May; 12:30	Club Olimpia (Paraguay)	24–29	(Chile) USAB handball	SAG Villa Ballester Gym, Villa Ballester; Attendance: 150; Referees: Araujo, Perdomo (URU)
27 May; 12:30	Fiore 5	(13–10)	Aguilera 9	SAG Villa Ballester Gym, Villa Ballester; Attendance: 150; Referees: Araujo, Perdomo (URU)
27 May; 12:30	4× (suspension) 1× (red card)	Report	2× (yellow card) 3× (suspension)	SAG Villa Ballester Gym, Villa Ballester; Attendance: 150; Referees: Araujo, Perdomo (URU)

=== 5–9th place semifinals ===
27 May; 14:30	Ovalle Balonmano (Chile)	21–25	(Argentina) Municipal of Maipú	SAG Villa Ballester Gym, Villa Ballester; Attendance: 400; Referees: Lopez-Grillo, Lenci (ARG)
27 May; 14:30	Aranguiz 8	(8–12)	Heredia 8	SAG Villa Ballester Gym, Villa Ballester; Attendance: 400; Referees: Lopez-Grillo, Lenci (ARG)
27 May; 14:30	1× (yellow card) 5× (suspension) 1× (red card)	Report	3× (yellow card) 4× (suspension)	SAG Villa Ballester Gym, Villa Ballester; Attendance: 400; Referees: Lopez-Grillo, Lenci (ARG)

27 May; 18:30	German School of Montevideo (Uruguay)	35–18	(Chile) USAB handball	SAG Villa Ballester Gym, Villa Ballester; Attendance: 1500; Referees: Godoy, Magalhaes (BRA)
27 May; 18:30	Velazco & Echeverry 5	(14–12)	Aguilera 4	SAG Villa Ballester Gym, Villa Ballester; Attendance: 1500; Referees: Godoy, Magalhaes (BRA)
27 May; 18:30	1× (yellow card) 1× (suspension)	Report	3× (yellow card) 4× (suspension)	SAG Villa Ballester Gym, Villa Ballester; Attendance: 1500; Referees: Godoy, Magalhaes (BRA)

=== Semifinals ===
27 May; 16:30	Handebol Taubaté (Brazil)	27–21	(Argentina) San Fernando HB	SAG Villa Ballester Gym, Villa Ballester; Attendance: 900; Referees: Lemes, Sosa (URU)
27 May; 16:30	Santos & Barros 5	(13–10)	Fernández 8	SAG Villa Ballester Gym, Villa Ballester; Attendance: 900; Referees: Lemes, Sosa (URU)
27 May; 16:30	2× (yellow card) 5× (suspension) 1× (red card)	Report	1× (yellow card) 4× (suspension)	SAG Villa Ballester Gym, Villa Ballester; Attendance: 900; Referees: Lemes, Sosa (URU)

27 May; 20:30	EC Pinheiros (Brazil)	28–23	(Argentina) SAG Villa Ballester	SAG Villa Ballester Gym, Villa Ballester; Attendance: 2500; Referees: Burgos, Delgado (ARG)
27 May; 20:30	Hubner & da Silva 6	(15–11)	Bono 10	SAG Villa Ballester Gym, Villa Ballester; Attendance: 2500; Referees: Burgos, Delgado (ARG)
27 May; 20:30	3× (yellow card) 4× (suspension)	Report	1× (yellow card) 5× (suspension) 1× (red card)	SAG Villa Ballester Gym, Villa Ballester; Attendance: 2500; Referees: Burgos, Delgado (ARG)

=== Seventh place game ===
28 May; 14:30	USAB handball (Chile)	19–22	(Chile) Ovalle Balonmano	SAG Villa Ballester Gym, Villa Ballester; Attendance: 150; Referees: Godoy, Magalhaes (BRA)
28 May; 14:30	Gomez 6	(6–14)	Aranguiz 6	SAG Villa Ballester Gym, Villa Ballester; Attendance: 150; Referees: Godoy, Magalhaes (BRA)
28 May; 14:30	2× (yellow card) 3× (suspension) 1× (red card)	Report	2× (yellow card) 5× (suspension)	SAG Villa Ballester Gym, Villa Ballester; Attendance: 150; Referees: Godoy, Magalhaes (BRA)

=== Fifth place game ===
28 May; 16:30	German School of Montevideo (Uruguay)	26–20	(Argentina) Municipal of Maipú	SAG Villa Ballester Gym, Villa Ballester; Attendance: 300; Referees: Burgos, Delgado (ARG)
28 May; 16:30	Velazco 8	(12–8)	Faraz 7	SAG Villa Ballester Gym, Villa Ballester; Attendance: 300; Referees: Burgos, Delgado (ARG)
28 May; 16:30	2× (yellow card) 4× (suspension)	Report	1× (yellow card) 4× (suspension)	SAG Villa Ballester Gym, Villa Ballester; Attendance: 300; Referees: Burgos, Delgado (ARG)

=== Third place game ===
28 May; 18:30	San Fernando HB (Argentina)	28–25	(Argentina) SAG Villa Ballester	SAG Villa Ballester Gym, Villa Ballester; Attendance: 1300; Referees: Lemes, Sosa (URU)
28 May; 18:30	Fernández 10	(13–12)	Bono 7	SAG Villa Ballester Gym, Villa Ballester; Attendance: 1300; Referees: Lemes, Sosa (URU)
28 May; 18:30	1× (yellow card) 3× (suspension) 1× (red card)	Report	2× (yellow card) 5× (suspension)	SAG Villa Ballester Gym, Villa Ballester; Attendance: 1300; Referees: Lemes, Sosa (URU)

=== Final ===
28 May; 20:30	Handebol Taubaté (Brazil)	27–20	(Brazil) EC Pinheiros	SAG Villa Ballester Gym, Villa Ballester; Attendance: 1200; Referees: Lenci, Lopez-Grillo (ARG)
28 May; 20:30	Three players 6	(12–13)	dos Santos 6	SAG Villa Ballester Gym, Villa Ballester; Attendance: 1200; Referees: Lenci, Lopez-Grillo (ARG)
28 May; 20:30	1× (yellow card) 3× (suspension)	Report	1× (yellow card) 3× (suspension)	SAG Villa Ballester Gym, Villa Ballester; Attendance: 1200; Referees: Lenci, Lopez-Grillo (ARG)

== Final standing ==
Rank	Team
Gold medal	(Brazil) Handebol Taubaté
Silver medal	(Brazil) EC Pinheiros
Bronze medal	(Argentina) San Fernando HB
4	(Argentina) SAG Villa Ballester
5	(Uruguay) German School of Montevideo
6	(Argentina) Municipal of Maipú
7	(Chile) Ovalle Balonmano
8	(Chile) USAB handball
9	(Paraguay) Club Olimpia

Team qualified to the 2022 IHF Men's Super Globe

2022 South and Central American Men's Club Champions

Handebol Taubaté
Second title

Team roster: Maik dos Santos, Washington Santos, Thiago Santos, Cléber Andrade, Fábio Guimarães, Denys Barros, Pedro Mota, Leandro Silva, Guilherme Torriani, Felipe Braz, Ronaldo Junior, Vinícius Teixeira, João Santos, Gustavo Silva, Matheus Filho, Guilherme Valadão Gama.
Head coach: Marcus "Tatá" Oliveira.

== All-star team ==
Name	Position	Club
Mateus Nascimento	Goalkeeper	(Brazil) EC Pinheiros
Francisco Soto	Left wing	(Argentina) SAG Villa Ballester
Matias Scovenna	Left back	(Argentina) SAG Villa Ballester
Dennys Barros	Centre back	(Brazil) Handebol Taubaté
Marcos da Silva	Right back	(Brazil) Handebol Taubaté
Washington Santos	Right wing	(Brazil) EC Pinheiros
(Brazil) Vinícius Teixeira	Pivot	(Brazil) Handebol Taubaté
