= 2023 South and Central American Men's Club Handball Championship =

Tournament details
- Host country: Brazil
- Venue(s): 1 (in 1 host city)
- Dates: 30 May – 3 June
- Teams: 11 (from 1 confederation)

Final positions
- Champions: (Argentina) San Fernando HB (1st title)
- Runner-up: (Brazil) Handebol Taubaté
- Third place: (Brazil) EC Pinheiros
- Fourth place: (Brazil) Handebol Cascavel

Tournament statistics
- Matches played: 25
- Goals scored: 1,472 (58.88 per match)
- Attendance: 11,161 (446 per match)

The 2023 South and Central American Men's Club Handball Championship the 4th edition of this tournament was held in São Paulo, Brazil from 30 May to 3 June 2023. It acted as a qualifying tournament for the 2023 IHF Men's Super Globe.

== Participating teams ==
- (Argentina) Ferro Carril Oeste
- (Argentina) San Fernando HB
- (Brazil) Handebol Cascavel
- (Brazil) EC Pinheiros
- (Brazil) Handebol Taubaté
- (Brazil) Handebol Itajaí
- (Brazil) Nacional Handebol Clube
- (Chile) DPV Kutral
- (Chile) Ovalle Balonmano
- (Paraguay) Club Olimpia
- (Paraguay) Luque HC

== Preliminary round ==
All times are local (UTC–3).

=== Group 1 ===
Pos	Team	Pld	W	D	L	GF	GA	GD	Pts	Qualification
1	(Brazil) Handebol Taubaté	3	3	0	0	112	60	+52	6	Semifinals
2	(Brazil) Handebol Cascavel	3	2	0	1	93	84	+9	4	Semifinals
3	(Chile) Ovalle Balonmano	3	1	0	2	75	100	−25	2	Ninth place game
4	(Paraguay) Club Olimpia	3	0	0	3	74	110	−36	0	9–11th place semifinal

Source: Handball SCA

30 May; 14:00	Club Olimpia (Paraguay)	26–30	(Chile) Ovalle Balonmano	Ginásio Poliesportivo Henrique Villaboim, São Paulo; Attendance: 360; Referees: Godoy & Magalhaes (BRA)
30 May; 14:00	Ribeiro 8	(17–13)	Frelijj 13	Ginásio Poliesportivo Henrique Villaboim, São Paulo; Attendance: 360; Referees: Godoy & Magalhaes (BRA)
30 May; 14:00	2× (yellow card) 4× (suspension)	Report	1× (yellow card) 3× (suspension)	Ginásio Poliesportivo Henrique Villaboim, São Paulo; Attendance: 360; Referees: Godoy & Magalhaes (BRA)

30 May; 18:00	Handebol Taubaté (Brazil)	31–20	(Brazil) Handebol Cascavel	Ginásio Poliesportivo Henrique Villaboim, São Paulo; Attendance: 300; Referees: S. Correa & Conberse (ARG)
30 May; 18:00	Junior 8	(16–9)	Vasques 6	Ginásio Poliesportivo Henrique Villaboim, São Paulo; Attendance: 300; Referees: S. Correa & Conberse (ARG)
30 May; 18:00	1× (suspension)	Report	4× (suspension) 1× (red card)	Ginásio Poliesportivo Henrique Villaboim, São Paulo; Attendance: 300; Referees: S. Correa & Conberse (ARG)

31 May; 12:00	Handebol Cascavel (Brazil)	33–23	(Chile) Ovalle Balonmano	Ginásio Poliesportivo Henrique Villaboim, São Paulo; Attendance: 50; Referees: B. Correa & R. Correa (BRA)
31 May; 12:00	Correia 6	(18–11)	Valenzuela 5	Ginásio Poliesportivo Henrique Villaboim, São Paulo; Attendance: 50; Referees: B. Correa & R. Correa (BRA)
31 May; 12:00	1× (yellow card) 7× (suspension) 1× (red card)	Report	2× (yellow card) 4× (suspension)	Ginásio Poliesportivo Henrique Villaboim, São Paulo; Attendance: 50; Referees: B. Correa & R. Correa (BRA)

31 May; 16:00	Handebol Taubaté (Brazil)	40–18	(Paraguay) Club Olimpia	Ginásio Poliesportivo Henrique Villaboim, São Paulo; Attendance: 120; Referees: S. Correa & Conberse (ARG)
31 May; 16:00	Benacedo 8	(23–5)	Ribeiro 6	Ginásio Poliesportivo Henrique Villaboim, São Paulo; Attendance: 120; Referees: S. Correa & Conberse (ARG)
31 May; 16:00	1× (yellow card) 2× (suspension)	Report	1× (suspension) 1× (red card)	Ginásio Poliesportivo Henrique Villaboim, São Paulo; Attendance: 120; Referees: S. Correa & Conberse (ARG)

1 June; 12:00	Club Olimpia (Paraguay)	30–40	(Brazil) Handebol Cascavel	Ginásio Poliesportivo Henrique Villaboim, São Paulo; Attendance: 120; Referees: Godoy & Magalhaes (BRA)
1 June; 12:00	Ribeiro 16	(14–18)	Rego 6	Ginásio Poliesportivo Henrique Villaboim, São Paulo; Attendance: 120; Referees: Godoy & Magalhaes (BRA)
1 June; 12:00	2× (yellow card) 3× (suspension)	Report	1× (yellow card) 5× (suspension)	Ginásio Poliesportivo Henrique Villaboim, São Paulo; Attendance: 120; Referees: Godoy & Magalhaes (BRA)

1 June; 16:00	Ovalle Balonmano (Chile)	22–41	(Brazil) Handebol Taubaté	Ginásio Poliesportivo Henrique Villaboim, São Paulo; Attendance: 350; Referees: Lopez & Lenci (ARG)
1 June; 16:00	Salazar 5	(14–25)	Santos 8	Ginásio Poliesportivo Henrique Villaboim, São Paulo; Attendance: 350; Referees: Lopez & Lenci (ARG)
1 June; 16:00	2× (suspension)	Report	1× (yellow card) 2× (suspension)	Ginásio Poliesportivo Henrique Villaboim, São Paulo; Attendance: 350; Referees: Lopez & Lenci (ARG)

=== Group 2 ===
Pos	Team	Pld	W	D	L	GF	GA	GD	Pts	Qualification
1	(Brazil) EC Pinheiros (H)	3	3	0	0	90	73	+17	6	Semifinals
2	(Brazil) Handebol Itajaí	3	2	0	1	75	77	−2	4	5–8th place semifinals
3	(Argentina) Ferro Carril Oeste	3	1	0	2	77	85	−8	2	5–8th place semifinals
4	(Brazil) Nacional Handebol Clube	3	0	0	3	85	92	−7	0	9–11th place semifinal

Source: Handball SCA
(H) Hosts

30 May; 16:00	Handebol Itajaí (Brazil)	26–21	(Argentina) Ferro Carril Oeste	Ginásio Poliesportivo Henrique Villaboim, São Paulo; Attendance: 400; Referees: Lemes & Sosa (URU)
30 May; 16:00	Luan & Dos Santos 5	(11–11)	Taurian 10	Ginásio Poliesportivo Henrique Villaboim, São Paulo; Attendance: 400; Referees: Lemes & Sosa (URU)
30 May; 16:00	1× (yellow card) 2× (suspension)	Report	1× (yellow card) 3× (suspension)	Ginásio Poliesportivo Henrique Villaboim, São Paulo; Attendance: 400; Referees: Lemes & Sosa (URU)

30 May; 20:00	EC Pinheiros (Brazil)	31–29	(Brazil) Nacional Handebol Clube	Ginásio Poliesportivo Henrique Villaboim, São Paulo; Attendance: 1350; Referees: Lopez & Lenci (ARG)
30 May; 20:00	Silva 5	(17–14)	Da Silva 11	Ginásio Poliesportivo Henrique Villaboim, São Paulo; Attendance: 1350; Referees: Lopez & Lenci (ARG)
30 May; 20:00	1× (yellow card) 4× (suspension)	Report	1× (yellow card) 5× (suspension) 1× (red card)	Ginásio Poliesportivo Henrique Villaboim, São Paulo; Attendance: 1350; Referees: Lopez & Lenci (ARG)

31 May; 14:00	Nacional Handebol Clube (Brazil)	30–34	(Argentina) Ferro Carril Oeste	Ginásio Poliesportivo Henrique Villaboim, São Paulo; Attendance: 290; Referees: Godoy & Magalhaes (BRA)
31 May; 14:00	Da Silva 8	(18–17)	Taurian 10	Ginásio Poliesportivo Henrique Villaboim, São Paulo; Attendance: 290; Referees: Godoy & Magalhaes (BRA)
31 May; 14:00	2× (yellow card) 1× (suspension)	Report	2× (yellow card) 4× (suspension)	Ginásio Poliesportivo Henrique Villaboim, São Paulo; Attendance: 290; Referees: Godoy & Magalhaes (BRA)

31 May; 20:00	Handebol Itajaí (Brazil)	22–30	(Brazil) EC Pinheiros	Ginásio Poliesportivo Henrique Villaboim, São Paulo; Attendance: 750; Referees: Lopez & Lenci (ARG)
31 May; 20:00	Duarte 6	(10–12)	Monte 6	Ginásio Poliesportivo Henrique Villaboim, São Paulo; Attendance: 750; Referees: Lopez & Lenci (ARG)
31 May; 20:00	1× (yellow card) 3× (suspension)	Report	2× (suspension)	Ginásio Poliesportivo Henrique Villaboim, São Paulo; Attendance: 750; Referees: Lopez & Lenci (ARG)

1 June; 18:00	Handebol Itajaí (Brazil)	27–26	(Brazil) Nacional Handebol Clube	Ginásio Poliesportivo Henrique Villaboim, São Paulo; Attendance: 250; Referees: S. Correa & Conberse (ARG)
1 June; 18:00	Duarte 9	(14–10)	Da Silva 8	Ginásio Poliesportivo Henrique Villaboim, São Paulo; Attendance: 250; Referees: S. Correa & Conberse (ARG)
1 June; 18:00	2× (suspension)	Report	1× (yellow card) 3× (suspension)	Ginásio Poliesportivo Henrique Villaboim, São Paulo; Attendance: 250; Referees: S. Correa & Conberse (ARG)

1 June; 20:00	EC Pinheiros (Brazil)	29–22	(Argentina) Ferro Carril Oeste	Ginásio Poliesportivo Henrique Villaboim, São Paulo; Attendance: 1200; Referees: Lemes & Sosa (URU)
1 June; 20:00	3 players 5	(17–10)	Mendive 6	Ginásio Poliesportivo Henrique Villaboim, São Paulo; Attendance: 1200; Referees: Lemes & Sosa (URU)
1 June; 20:00	2× (yellow card) 4× (suspension)	Report	1× (yellow card) 4× (suspension)	Ginásio Poliesportivo Henrique Villaboim, São Paulo; Attendance: 1200; Referees: Lemes & Sosa (URU)

=== Group 3 ===
Pos	Team	Pld	W	D	L	GF	GA	GD	Pts	Qualification
1	(Argentina) San Fernando HB	2	2	0	0	90	41	+49	4	Semifinals
2	(Chile) DPV Kutral	2	1	0	1	45	70	−25	2	5–8th place semifinals
3	(Paraguay) Luque HC	2	0	0	2	54	78	−24	0	5–8th place semifinals

Source: Handball SCA

30 May; 12:00	DPV Kutral (Chile)	30–28	(Paraguay) Luque HC	Ginásio Poliesportivo Henrique Villaboim, São Paulo; Attendance: 100; Referees: B. Correa & R. Correa (BRA)
30 May; 12:00	Salgado 7	(14–12)	Martinez 8	Ginásio Poliesportivo Henrique Villaboim, São Paulo; Attendance: 100; Referees: B. Correa & R. Correa (BRA)
30 May; 12:00	3× (suspension)	Report	1× (yellow card) 6× (suspension)	Ginásio Poliesportivo Henrique Villaboim, São Paulo; Attendance: 100; Referees: B. Correa & R. Correa (BRA)

31 May; 18:00	San Fernando HB (Argentina)	48–26	(Paraguay) Luque HC	Ginásio Poliesportivo Henrique Villaboim, São Paulo; Attendance: 420; Referees: Lemes & Sosa (URU)
31 May; 18:00	Gimenez & Ricobelli 10	(22–10)	Duarte 6	Ginásio Poliesportivo Henrique Villaboim, São Paulo; Attendance: 420; Referees: Lemes & Sosa (URU)
31 May; 18:00	3× (suspension)	Report	1× (yellow card) 6× (suspension)	Ginásio Poliesportivo Henrique Villaboim, São Paulo; Attendance: 420; Referees: Lemes & Sosa (URU)

1 June; 14:00	San Fernando HB (Argentina)	42–15	(Chile) DPV Kutral	Ginásio Poliesportivo Henrique Villaboim, São Paulo; Attendance: 320; Referees: B. Correa & R. Correa (BRA)
1 June; 14:00	Fernandez 8	(17–7)	Salgado 5	Ginásio Poliesportivo Henrique Villaboim, São Paulo; Attendance: 320; Referees: B. Correa & R. Correa (BRA)
1 June; 14:00	1× (yellow card) 2× (suspension)	Report	4× (suspension) 1× (red card)	Ginásio Poliesportivo Henrique Villaboim, São Paulo; Attendance: 320; Referees: B. Correa & R. Correa (BRA)

== Knockout stage ==
=== Bracket ===
9–11th place semifinal			Ninth place
4. G2	(Brazil) Nacional Handebol Clube	49
4. G1	(Paraguay) Club Olimpia	30
4. G1	(Paraguay) Club Olimpia	30	4. G2	(Brazil) Nacional Handebol Clube	36
			3. G1	(Chile) Ovalle Balonmano	29

5–8th place semifinals
2. G2	(Brazil) Handebol Itajaí	42
3. G3	(Paraguay) Luque HC	29
2. G3	(Chile) DPV Kutral	22
3. G2	(Argentina) Ferro Carril Oeste	24

Fifth place
2. G2	(Brazil) Handebol Itajaí	24
3. G2	(Argentina) Ferro Carril Oeste	25
Seventh place
3. G3	(Paraguay) Luque HC	25
2. G3	(Chile) DPV Kutral	30

Semifinals
1. G3	(Argentina) San Fernando HB	34
2. G2	(Brazil) Handebol Cascavel	29
1. G1	(Brazil) Handebol Taubaté	24
1. G2	(Brazil) EC Pinheiros	22

Finals
1. G3	(Argentina) San Fernando HB	35
1. G1	(Brazil) Handebol Taubaté	33
Third place
2. G2	(Brazil) Handebol Cascavel	27
1. G2	(Brazil) EC Pinheiros	33

=== 9–11th place semifinal ===
2 June; 11:00	Nacional Handebol Clube (Brazil)	49–30	(Paraguay) Club Olimpia	Ginásio Poliesportivo Henrique Villaboim, São Paulo; Attendance: 220; Referees: S. Correa & Conberse (ARG)
2 June; 11:00	Da Conceicao 14	(24–17)	Alfonzo & Ribeiro 6	Ginásio Poliesportivo Henrique Villaboim, São Paulo; Attendance: 220; Referees: S. Correa & Conberse (ARG)
2 June; 11:00		Report	3× (suspension)	Ginásio Poliesportivo Henrique Villaboim, São Paulo; Attendance: 220; Referees: S. Correa & Conberse (ARG)

=== 5–8th place semifinals ===
2 June; 13:00	Handebol Itajaí (Brazil)	42–29	(Paraguay) Luque HC	Ginásio Poliesportivo Henrique Villaboim, São Paulo; Attendance: 150; Referees: Lemes & Soasa (URU)
2 June; 13:00	Stache 10	(23–13)	Duarte 8	Ginásio Poliesportivo Henrique Villaboim, São Paulo; Attendance: 150; Referees: Lemes & Soasa (URU)
2 June; 13:00	2× (suspension)	Report	1× (yellow card) 1× (suspension)	Ginásio Poliesportivo Henrique Villaboim, São Paulo; Attendance: 150; Referees: Lemes & Soasa (URU)

2 June; 15:00	DPV Kutral (Chile)	22–24	(Argentina) Ferro Carril Oeste	Ginásio Poliesportivo Henrique Villaboim, São Paulo; Attendance: 320; Referees: B. Correa & R. Correa (BRA)
2 June; 15:00	Salgado 9	(12–14)	Mendive 7	Ginásio Poliesportivo Henrique Villaboim, São Paulo; Attendance: 320; Referees: B. Correa & R. Correa (BRA)
2 June; 15:00	3× (suspension)	Report	1× (yellow card) 2× (suspension)	Ginásio Poliesportivo Henrique Villaboim, São Paulo; Attendance: 320; Referees: B. Correa & R. Correa (BRA)

=== Semifinals ===
2 June; 17:00	San Fernando HB (Argentina)	34–29	(Brazil) Handebol Cascavel	Ginásio Poliesportivo Henrique Villaboim, São Paulo; Attendance: 350; Referees: Godoy & Magalhaes (BRA)
2 June; 17:00	Fernandez 8	(15–10)	Ribeiro 6	Ginásio Poliesportivo Henrique Villaboim, São Paulo; Attendance: 350; Referees: Godoy & Magalhaes (BRA)
2 June; 17:00	2× (yellow card) 1× (suspension)	Report	1× (yellow card) 7× (suspension)	Ginásio Poliesportivo Henrique Villaboim, São Paulo; Attendance: 350; Referees: Godoy & Magalhaes (BRA)

2 June; 20:00	Handebol Taubaté (Brazil)	24–22	(Brazil) EC Pinheiros	Ginásio Poliesportivo Henrique Villaboim, São Paulo; Attendance: 1122; Referees: Lopez & Lenci (ARG)
2 June; 20:00	Silva & Gama 5	(13–11)	Da Silva 5	Ginásio Poliesportivo Henrique Villaboim, São Paulo; Attendance: 1122; Referees: Lopez & Lenci (ARG)
2 June; 20:00	2× (suspension)	Report	1× (yellow card) 2× (suspension)	Ginásio Poliesportivo Henrique Villaboim, São Paulo; Attendance: 1122; Referees: Lopez & Lenci (ARG)

=== Ninth place game ===
3 June; 11:00	Nacional Handebol Clube (Brazil)	36–29	(Chile) Ovalle Balonmano	Ginásio Poliesportivo Henrique Villaboim, São Paulo; Attendance: 286; Referees: Godoy & Magalhaes (BRA)
3 June; 11:00	Dealmeida 8	(15–17)	Freijj 7	Ginásio Poliesportivo Henrique Villaboim, São Paulo; Attendance: 286; Referees: Godoy & Magalhaes (BRA)
3 June; 11:00	3× (suspension)	Report	1× (yellow card) 2× (suspension)	Ginásio Poliesportivo Henrique Villaboim, São Paulo; Attendance: 286; Referees: Godoy & Magalhaes (BRA)

=== Seventh place game ===
3 June; 13:00	Luque HC (Paraguay)	25–30	(Chile) DPV Kutral	Ginásio Poliesportivo Henrique Villaboim, São Paulo; Attendance: 183; Referees: B. Correa & R. Correa (BRA)
3 June; 13:00	Samudio 6	(11–13)	Salgado 14	Ginásio Poliesportivo Henrique Villaboim, São Paulo; Attendance: 183; Referees: B. Correa & R. Correa (BRA)
3 June; 13:00	2× (suspension)	Report	1× (yellow card) 3× (suspension)	Ginásio Poliesportivo Henrique Villaboim, São Paulo; Attendance: 183; Referees: B. Correa & R. Correa (BRA)

=== Fifth place game ===
3 June; 15:00	Handebol Itajaí (Brazil)	24–25	(Argentina) Ferro Carril Oeste	Ginásio Poliesportivo Henrique Villaboim, São Paulo; Attendance: 370; Referees: S. Correa & Conberse (ARG)
3 June; 15:00	Luan & Henn 6	(14–10)	Ceccardi & Duhau 6	Ginásio Poliesportivo Henrique Villaboim, São Paulo; Attendance: 370; Referees: S. Correa & Conberse (ARG)
3 June; 15:00	1× (yellow card) 2× (suspension)	Report	2× (yellow card) 2× (suspension)	Ginásio Poliesportivo Henrique Villaboim, São Paulo; Attendance: 370; Referees: S. Correa & Conberse (ARG)

=== Third place game ===
3 June; 17:00	Handebol Cascavel (Brazil)	27–33	(Brazil) EC Pinheiros	Ginásio Poliesportivo Henrique Villaboim, São Paulo; Attendance: 850; Referees: Lopez & Lenci (ARG)
3 June; 17:00	Da Silva 11	(13–21)	Monte 8	Ginásio Poliesportivo Henrique Villaboim, São Paulo; Attendance: 850; Referees: Lopez & Lenci (ARG)
3 June; 17:00	1× (yellow card) 2× (suspension)	Report	2× (suspension)	Ginásio Poliesportivo Henrique Villaboim, São Paulo; Attendance: 850; Referees: Lopez & Lenci (ARG)

=== Final ===
3 June
20:00
San Fernando HB (Argentina)
35–33 (ET)
(Brazil) Handebol Taubaté
Ginásio Poliesportivo Henrique Villaboim, São Paulo
Attendance: 930
Referees: Lemes & Soasa (URU)
Fernández 9
(12–17)
3 players 7
2× (yellow card) 5× (suspension) 1× (red card)
Report
2× (yellow card) 5× (suspension) 1× (red card)

FT: 28–28 ET: 7–5

== Final standing ==
Rank	Team
Gold medal	(Argentina) San Fernando HB
Silver medal	(Brazil) Handebol Taubaté
Bronze medal	(Brazil) EC Pinheiros
4	(Brazil) Handebol Cascavel
5	(Argentina) Ferro Carril Oeste
6	(Brazil) Handebol Itajaí
7	(Chile) DPV Kutral
8	(Paraguay) Luque HC
9	(Brazil) Nacional Handebol Clube
10	(Chile) Ovalle Balonmano
11	(Paraguay) Club Olimpia

Team qualified to the 2023 IHF Men's Super Globe

2023 South and Central American Men's Club Champions

San Fernando HB
First title

Team roster: Lautaro Rodriguez, Federico Gastón Fernández, Tomas Noto, Kevin Urban, Mariano Betancourt, Mariano Cánepa, Sebastian Fernández, Ezequiel Gimenez, Juan Pablo Fernández, Patricio Orlandi, Patricio Verdino, Juan Noto, Nicolas Vella, Augustin Batistela, Ricardo Fallati, Fernando Dieguez.
Head coach: Elio Fernández.
