= Andrés Kogovsek =

Argentine handball player

Personal information
- Nationality: Argentine
- Born: 7 January 1974 (age 52) San Isidro, Buenos Aires

Sport
- Sport: Handball
National team
- Years: Team
- –: Argentina

Andrés Kogovsek (born 7 January 1974) is an Argentine handball player. He was born in San Isidro, Argentina, and plays for the club Villa Ballester. He defended Argentina at the 2012 London Summer Olympics, and was a gold medalist at the 2011 Pan American Games.

== Achievements ==
- Argentine League
  - 2015, 2017

== Individual awards ==
- 2017 Pan American Men's Club Handball Championship: Best right wing
