= Julián Souto Cueto =

Argentine handball player

Personal information
- Nationality: Argentine
- Born: 1 October 1992 (age 34)
- Height: 1.81 m (5 ft 11 in)

Sport
- Sport: Handball
- Position: Centre back
- Current club: Albatro Siracusa
National team
Years	Team	Apps	(Gls)
–	Argentina	37	(148)
Medal record
Pan American Championship
Gold medal – first place	2018 Greenland
Bronze medal – third place	2016 Argentina
South and Central American Championship
Gold medal – first place	2026 Paraguay
South American Games
Silver medal – second place	2018 Cochabamba	Team

Julián Souto Cueto (born 1 October 1992) is an Argentine handball player for Albatro Siracusa and the Argentine national team.

He participated at the 2017 World Men's Handball Championship.

== Titles ==
- Pan American Men's Club Handball Championship:
  - 2017

== Individual Achiviements ==
- Top scorer:
  - 2015 Pan American Men's Club Handball Championship
- MVP:
  - 2015 Pan American Men's Club Handball Championship
- All star team: Playmaker:
  - 2016 Pan American Men's Club Handball Championship
