= 2018 International Tournament of Spain =

Tournament details
- Host country: Spain
- Venue(s): 2 (in 2 host cities)
- Dates: 05–07 January
- Teams: 4 (from 2 confederations)

Final positions
- Champions: Spain
- Runner-up: Belarus
- Third place: Argentina
- Fourth place: Poland

Tournament statistics
- Matches played: 6
- Goals scored: 341 (56.83 per match)
- Top scorer(s): (Argentina) Federico Fernández (18 goals)

The 2018 International Tournament of Spain was the 43rd edition of the International Tournament of Spain, 17th edition with the name of Memorial Domingo Barcenas, held in Pontevedra and Vigo, Spain between 5–7 January as a friendly handball tournament organised by the Royal Spanish Handball Federation as a preparation of the host nation to the 2018 European Men's Handball Championship.

== Results ==
Team	Pld	W	D	L	GF	GA	GD	Pts
Spain	3	3	0	0	103	80	+23	6
Belarus	3	1	0	2	86	85	+1	2
Argentina	3	1	0	2	79	84	–5	2
Poland	3	1	0	2	74	93	–19	2

== Round robin ==
All times are local (UTC+01:00).

January 5; 16:00	Argentina	29–24	Poland	Pavillón Municipal dos Deportes de Pontevedra, Pontevedra
January 5; 16:00	Fernández 8	(13–13)	Moryto 6	Pavillón Municipal dos Deportes de Pontevedra, Pontevedra
January 5; 16:00		Report		Pavillón Municipal dos Deportes de Pontevedra, Pontevedra

January 5; 18:00	Spain	35–30	Belarus	Pavillón Municipal dos Deportes de Pontevedra, Pontevedra
January 5; 18:00	Balaguer 6	(18–16)	Karvatski, Bokhan 5	Pavillón Municipal dos Deportes de Pontevedra, Pontevedra
January 5; 18:00		Report		Pavillón Municipal dos Deportes de Pontevedra, Pontevedra

January 6; 17:30	Poland	28–27	Belarus	Pavillón Municipal dos Deportes de Pontevedra, Pontevedra
January 6; 17:30	T. Gębala 8	(14–15)	Kulesh, Karvatski 5	Pavillón Municipal dos Deportes de Pontevedra, Pontevedra
January 6; 17:30		Report		Pavillón Municipal dos Deportes de Pontevedra, Pontevedra

January 6; 19:30	Spain	31–28	Argentina	Pavillón Municipal dos Deportes de Pontevedra, Pontevedra
January 6; 19:30	Aguinagalde, Solé 5	(15–13)	Fernández 8	Pavillón Municipal dos Deportes de Pontevedra, Pontevedra
January 6; 19:30		Report		Pavillón Municipal dos Deportes de Pontevedra, Pontevedra

January 7; 16:00	Belarus	29–22	Argentina	Complejo Deportivo de As Travesas, Vigo
January 7; 16:00	Pukhouski 7	(14–14)	four players 3	Complejo Deportivo de As Travesas, Vigo
January 7; 16:00		Report		Complejo Deportivo de As Travesas, Vigo

January 7; 18:00	Spain	37–22	Poland	Complejo Deportivo de As Travesas, Vigo
January 7; 18:00	Gurbindo 6	(17–12)	Moryto 5	Complejo Deportivo de As Travesas, Vigo
January 7; 18:00		Report		Complejo Deportivo de As Travesas, Vigo

== Final standing ==
Rank	Team
Gold medal	Spain
2	Belarus
3	Argentina
4	Poland
