= Leonardo Dutra =

Brazilian handball player (born 1996)

Personal information
- Full name: Leonardo Dutra Ferreira
- Born: 29 March 1996 (age 30) Anápolis, Brazil
- Height: 1.84 m (6 ft 0 in)

Sport
- Sport: Handball
- Position: Centre back
- Current club: RK Vardar
- Number: 33

Senior clubs
- Years: Team
- 2020–2021: Wisla Plock
- 2021–2023: CB Ciudad de Logroño
- 2023–: RK Vardar
National team
Years	Team	Apps	(Gls)
2016–	Brazil	17	(37)
Medal record
Pan American Games
Silver medal – second place	2023 Santiago	Team
Pan American Championship
Silver medal – second place	2018 Greenland
South and Central American Championship
Gold medal – first place	2022 Brazil
Gold medal – first place	2024 Argentina
South American Games
Gold medal – first place	2018 Cochabamba	Team
Pan American Junior Championship
Gold medal – first place	2017 Paraguay
Pan American Youth Championship
Gold medal – first place	2015 Venezuela

Leonardo Dutra (born 29 March 1996) is a Brazilian handball player for Brazilian national team.

He participated at the 2017 World Men's Handball Championship.

== Titles ==
- Pan American Men's Club Handball Championship:
  - 2017
- Macedonian Handball Cup

Winner : 2023

== Individual awards and achievements ==
Top Scorer

- 2016 Pan American Men's Club Handball Championship

MVP

- 2016 Pan American Men's Club Handball Championship
- Liga Nacional de Handebol 2016

All star team left back

- 2016 Pan American Men's Club Handball Championship
- 2017 Pan American Men's Club Handball Championship
