= Torneo Nacional de Clubes 2017 =

2017 Torneo Nacional de Clubes
Tournament details
- Host country: Argentina
- Venue(s): 3 (in 3 host cities)
- Dates: August – September
- Teams: 8

Final positions
- Champions: SAG Villa Ballester (10th title)
- Runners-up: Ferro Carril Oeste
- Third place: UNLu
- Fourth place: Escuela Pías

Tournament statistics
- Top scorer(s): (Argentina) Federico Pizarro (43 goals)

The Torneo Nacional de Clubes 2017 (2017 Clubs National Tournament) was the 42nd edition of the main clubs handball tournament organised by the Confederación Argentina de Handball, it was held between August and September at the cities of Córdoba, Montecarlo and the Final Four at Villa Ballester.

== Groups Stage ==
=== Group A ===
Group A was played at Córdoba

Team	Pld	W	D	L	GF	GA	GD
UNLu	3	3	0	0	108	75	33
Escuela Pías	3	1	0	2	71	78	–7
Municipalidad de Maipú	3	1	0	2	80	90	–10
CISD Nueva Generacion	3	1	0	2	78	94	–16

=== Group B ===
Group B was played at Montecarlo

Team	Pld	W	D	L	GF	GA	GD
SAG Villa Ballester	3	3	0	0	117	50	67
Ferro Carril Oeste	3	2	0	1	91	78	13
Gimnasia y Cultura	3	1	0	2	61	89	–28
EM de Cipolletti	3	0	0	3	62	114	–52

Teams qualified to the Final Four

== Knockout stage ==
=== Final Four ===
Semifinals
16 September
SAG Villa Ballester	36
Escuela Pías	24
16 September
UNLu	33
Ferro Carril Oeste	34

Final
17 September
SAG Villa Ballester	28
Ferro Carril Oeste	23
Third place game
17 September
Escuela Pías	27
UNLu	36

== Semi finals ==
16 September 2017; 16:00	SAG Villa Ballester	36–24	Escuela Pías	Estadio Mundialista SAG, Villa Ballester; Attendance: 350; Referees: Paolantoni, Zanikian (ARG)
16 September 2017; 16:00	Corning 7	(19–8)	Llares 6	Estadio Mundialista SAG, Villa Ballester; Attendance: 350; Referees: Paolantoni, Zanikian (ARG)
16 September 2017; 16:00	2× (yellow card) 3× (suspension)	Report	4× (yellow card) 1× (suspension)	Estadio Mundialista SAG, Villa Ballester; Attendance: 350; Referees: Paolantoni, Zanikian (ARG)

16 September 2017; 18:00	UNLu	33–34	Ferro Carril Oeste	Estadio Mundialista SAG, Villa Ballester; Attendance: 650; Referees: Delgado, Burgos (ARG)
16 September 2017; 18:00	Pizarro 11	(17–17)	Taurian 8	Estadio Mundialista SAG, Villa Ballester; Attendance: 650; Referees: Delgado, Burgos (ARG)
16 September 2017; 18:00	2× (yellow card) 3× (suspension)	Report	2× (yellow card) 4× (suspension) 2× (red card)	Estadio Mundialista SAG, Villa Ballester; Attendance: 650; Referees: Delgado, Burgos (ARG)

== 3rd place match ==
17 September 2017; 12:00	Escuela Pías	27–36	UNLu	Estadio Mundialista SAG, Villa Ballester; Attendance: 150; Referees: Aizen, Acuna (ARG)
17 September 2017; 12:00	Pizarro 20	(13–15)	Heredia, Llares 5	Estadio Mundialista SAG, Villa Ballester; Attendance: 150; Referees: Aizen, Acuna (ARG)
17 September 2017; 12:00	1× (yellow card) 4× (suspension)	Report	1× (yellow card) 2× (suspension)	Estadio Mundialista SAG, Villa Ballester; Attendance: 150; Referees: Aizen, Acuna (ARG)

== Final ==
17 September 2017; 14:00	SAG Villa Ballester	28–23	Ferro Carril Oeste	Estadio Mundialista SAG, Villa Ballester; Attendance: 450; Referees: Burgos, Delgado (ARG)
17 September 2017; 14:00	Kogovsek, Cánepa 6	(13–11)	Crivelli 5	Estadio Mundialista SAG, Villa Ballester; Attendance: 450; Referees: Burgos, Delgado (ARG)
17 September 2017; 14:00	3× (yellow card) 5× (suspension)	Report	3× (yellow card) 6× (suspension)	Estadio Mundialista SAG, Villa Ballester; Attendance: 450; Referees: Burgos, Delgado (ARG)

== Final standing ==
Rank	Team
1	SAG Villa Ballester
2	Ferro Carril Oeste
3	UNLu
4	Escuela Pías

Team qualified to the 2018 Pan American Men's Club Handball Championship
