= 2023 Asian Men's Club League Handball Championship =

Asian men's handball championship tournament

25th Asian Men's Club League Handball Championship
- Logo of 25th AHF Asian Men's Club League Handball Championship

Tournament details
- Host country: Iran
- Venue(s): 1 (in 1 host city)
- Dates: 1 – 10 June 2023
- Teams: 11 (from 8 confederations)

Final positions
- Champions: (Bahrain) Al-Najma (2 titles)

‌The 2023 Asian Club League Handball Championship is the 25th edition of the championship scheduled to be held from 1 to 10 June 2023 at Isfahan, Iran under the aegis of Asian Handball Federation. It will be the fourth time in history that the championship was organised by the Islamic Republic of Iran Handball Federation. It also acted as the qualification tournament for the 2023 IHF Men's Super Globe, with top team from the championship directly qualifying for the event to be held in Dammam, Saudi Arabia. Al-Jaish SC from Syria withdrew before the draw.

== Group A ==
Pos	Team	Pld	W	D	L	GF	GA	GD	Pts	Qualification
1	(Qatar) Al-Rayyan SC	4	3	0	1	127	86	+41	6	Semifinals
2	(Kuwait) Kazma SC	4	3	0	1	132	107	+25	6	Semifinals
3	(Iran) Foolad Mobarakeh Sepahan	4	3	0	1	95	83	+12	6	Fifth place game
4	Oman Club	4	1	0	3	111	121	−10	2	Seventh place game
5	(India) T-Sports Club	4	0	0	4	55	123	−68	0	Ninth place game

Source: AHF

1 June 2023; 12:00	Kazma SC (Kuwait)	43–20	(India) T-Sports Club	Naghsh-e-Jahan Arena, Isfahan; Referees: Kha. Ismoilov & Khu. Ismoilov (UZB)
1 June 2023; 12:00	Frad 10	(20–12)	Kazemi & Bijary 6	Naghsh-e-Jahan Arena, Isfahan; Referees: Kha. Ismoilov & Khu. Ismoilov (UZB)
1 June 2023; 12:00	4× (suspension)	Report	1× (suspension)	Naghsh-e-Jahan Arena, Isfahan; Referees: Kha. Ismoilov & Khu. Ismoilov (UZB)

1 June 2023; 18:00	Al-Rayyan SC (Qatar)	31–23	(Iran) Foolad Mobarakeh Sepahan	Naghsh-e-Jahan Arena, Isfahan; Referees: Koo & Lee (KOR)
1 June 2023; 18:00	Fekih 9	(14–11)	Vujović 6	Naghsh-e-Jahan Arena, Isfahan; Referees: Koo & Lee (KOR)
1 June 2023; 18:00	3× (suspension)	Report	3× (suspension) 1×	Naghsh-e-Jahan Arena, Isfahan; Referees: Koo & Lee (KOR)

2 June 2023; 10:00	Oman Club	35–20	(India) T-Sports Club	Naghsh-e-Jahan Arena, Isfahan
2 June 2023; 10:00		Report		Naghsh-e-Jahan Arena, Isfahan

2 June 2023; 18:00	Kazma SC (Kuwait)	28–30	(Iran) Foolad Mobarakeh Sepahan	Naghsh-e-Jahan Arena, Isfahan; Referees: Nachevski & Nikolov (MKD)
2 June 2023; 18:00	Frad 8	(18–20)	Sadeghi Askari 6	Naghsh-e-Jahan Arena, Isfahan; Referees: Nachevski & Nikolov (MKD)
2 June 2023; 18:00	1× (yellow card) 3× (suspension) 1× (red card)	Report	2× (yellow card) 6× (suspension) 1×	Naghsh-e-Jahan Arena, Isfahan; Referees: Nachevski & Nikolov (MKD)

3 June 2023; 10:00	T-Sports Club (India)	15–35	(Qatar) Al-Rayyan SC	Naghsh-e-Jahan Arena, Isfahan; Referees: Ah. Gheisarian & Am. Gheisarian (IRI)
3 June 2023; 10:00	Kazemi & Bijary 4	(8–18)	Al-Mughanni 7	Naghsh-e-Jahan Arena, Isfahan; Referees: Ah. Gheisarian & Am. Gheisarian (IRI)
3 June 2023; 10:00	3× (suspension)	Report	2× (suspension) 1× (red card)	Naghsh-e-Jahan Arena, Isfahan; Referees: Ah. Gheisarian & Am. Gheisarian (IRI)

3 June 2023; 16:00	Kazma SC (Kuwait)	34–31	Oman Club	Naghsh-e-Jahan Arena, Isfahan; Referees: Ismoilov & Ismoilov (UZB)
3 June 2023; 16:00	Ben Abdallah 9	(13–12)	Al-Jazi 8	Naghsh-e-Jahan Arena, Isfahan; Referees: Ismoilov & Ismoilov (UZB)
3 June 2023; 16:00	6× (suspension)	Report	4× (suspension) 1× (red card)	Naghsh-e-Jahan Arena, Isfahan; Referees: Ismoilov & Ismoilov (UZB)

5 June 2023; 16:00	Al-Rayyan SC (Qatar)	26–27	(Kuwait) Kazma SC	Naghsh-e-Jahan Arena, Isfahan; Referees: Koo & Lee (KOR)
5 June 2023; 16:00	Fekih 8	(8–14)	Ben Abdallah 10	Naghsh-e-Jahan Arena, Isfahan; Referees: Koo & Lee (KOR)
5 June 2023; 16:00	1× (yellow card) 4× (suspension)	Report	7× (suspension) 1× (red card)	Naghsh-e-Jahan Arena, Isfahan; Referees: Koo & Lee (KOR)

5 June 2023; 18:00	Oman Club	24–32	(Iran) Foolad Mobarakeh Sepahan	Naghsh-e-Jahan Arena, Isfahan; Referees: Al-Mawt & Marhoon (BHR)
5 June 2023; 18:00	Al-Dyghaishi & Al-Tamtami 5	(9–18)	Oraei 6	Naghsh-e-Jahan Arena, Isfahan; Referees: Al-Mawt & Marhoon (BHR)
5 June 2023; 18:00	2× (yellow card) 3× (suspension)	Report	3× (suspension)	Naghsh-e-Jahan Arena, Isfahan; Referees: Al-Mawt & Marhoon (BHR)

6 June 2023; 14:00	Al-Rayyan SC (Qatar)	35–21	Oman Club	Naghsh-e-Jahan Arena, Isfahan
6 June 2023; 14:00		(21–10)		Naghsh-e-Jahan Arena, Isfahan
6 June 2023; 14:00		Report		Naghsh-e-Jahan Arena, Isfahan

6 June 2023; 18:00	Foolad Mobarakeh Sepahan (Iran)	10–0	(India) T-Sports Club	Naghsh-e-Jahan Arena, Isfahan
6 June 2023; 18:00		Report		Naghsh-e-Jahan Arena, Isfahan

== Group B ==
Pos	Team	Pld	W	D	L	GF	GA	GD	Pts	Qualification
1	(Qatar) Al-Duhail SC	5	4	0	1	172	138	+34	8	Semifinals
2	(Bahrain) Al-Najma	5	4	0	1	182	152	+30	8	Semifinals
3	Al-Kuwait SC	5	4	0	1	191	171	+20	8	Fifth place game
4	(Iran) Shahid Shameli Kazeroon	5	2	0	3	164	171	−7	4	Seventh place game
5	(China) Junior Club	5	0	1	4	147	183	−36	1	Ninth place game
6	(Uzbekistan) RKOR Tashkent	5	0	1	4	143	184	−41	1	Eleventh place

Source: AHF

1 June 2023; 10:00	RKOR Tashkent (Uzbekistan)	26–39	(Qatar) Al-Duhail SC	Naghsh-e-Jahan Arena, Isfahan; Referees: Ah. Gheisarian & Am. Gheisarian (IRI)
1 June 2023; 10:00	Sedinkin 7	(8–20)	Kapic & Hadj Ayed 7	Naghsh-e-Jahan Arena, Isfahan; Referees: Ah. Gheisarian & Am. Gheisarian (IRI)
1 June 2023; 10:00	1× (suspension)	Report	2× (suspension)	Naghsh-e-Jahan Arena, Isfahan; Referees: Ah. Gheisarian & Am. Gheisarian (IRI)

1 June 2023; 14:00	Junior Club (China)	32–39	(Iran) Shahid Shameli Kazeroon	Naghsh-e-Jahan Arena, Isfahan; Referees: Hussein & Imran (IRQ)
1 June 2023; 14:00	Zhang 6	(16–20)	Karamian 8	Naghsh-e-Jahan Arena, Isfahan; Referees: Hussein & Imran (IRQ)
1 June 2023; 14:00	2× (suspension)	Report	5× (suspension)	Naghsh-e-Jahan Arena, Isfahan; Referees: Hussein & Imran (IRQ)

1 June 2023; 16:00	Al-Kuwait SC	38–36	(Bahrain) Al-Najma	Naghsh-e-Jahan Arena, Isfahan; Referees: Nachevski & Nikolov (MKD)
1 June 2023; 16:00	Teixeira 7	(18–19)	Qambar 8	Naghsh-e-Jahan Arena, Isfahan; Referees: Nachevski & Nikolov (MKD)
1 June 2023; 16:00	6× (suspension)	Report	2× (yellow card) 10× (suspension)	Naghsh-e-Jahan Arena, Isfahan; Referees: Nachevski & Nikolov (MKD)

2 June 2023; 12:00	Junior Club (China)	25–25	(Uzbekistan) RKOR Tashkent	Naghsh-e-Jahan Arena, Isfahan; Referees: Al-Wahibi & Al-Shahi (OMA)
2 June 2023; 12:00	Shan & Zhu 6	(13–17)	Islomov & Joldasbayev 5	Naghsh-e-Jahan Arena, Isfahan; Referees: Al-Wahibi & Al-Shahi (OMA)
2 June 2023; 12:00	1× (yellow card) 3× (suspension)	Report	3× (suspension)	Naghsh-e-Jahan Arena, Isfahan; Referees: Al-Wahibi & Al-Shahi (OMA)

2 June 2023; 14:00	Shahid Shameli Kazeroon (Iran)	30–40	Al-Kuwait SC	Naghsh-e-Jahan Arena, Isfahan; Referees: Hideki & Tetsuro (JPN)
2 June 2023; 14:00	Ghasemi 6	(16–25)	Al-Gharabballi 8	Naghsh-e-Jahan Arena, Isfahan; Referees: Hideki & Tetsuro (JPN)
2 June 2023; 14:00	7× (suspension)	Report	2× (suspension)	Naghsh-e-Jahan Arena, Isfahan; Referees: Hideki & Tetsuro (JPN)

2 June 2023; 16:00	Al-Duhail SC (Qatar)	26–28	(Bahrain) Al-Najma	Naghsh-e-Jahan Arena, Isfahan
2 June 2023; 16:00		(14–12)		Naghsh-e-Jahan Arena, Isfahan
2 June 2023; 16:00		Report		Naghsh-e-Jahan Arena, Isfahan

3 June 2023; 12:00	RKOR Tashkent (Uzbekistan)	34–39	(Iran) Shahid Shameli Kazeroon	Naghsh-e-Jahan Arena, Isfahan; Referees: Cheng & Zhou (CHN)
3 June 2023; 12:00	Sedinkin 8	(18–13)	Ghasemi 7	Naghsh-e-Jahan Arena, Isfahan; Referees: Cheng & Zhou (CHN)
3 June 2023; 12:00	3× (suspension)	Report	1× (yellow card) 2× (suspension) 1× (red card)	Naghsh-e-Jahan Arena, Isfahan; Referees: Cheng & Zhou (CHN)

3 June 2023; 14:00	Al-Najma (Bahrain)	38–27	(China) Junior Club	Naghsh-e-Jahan Arena, Isfahan; Referees: Al-Zayyat & Awwad (JOR)
3 June 2023; 14:00	Mohamed 7	(20–13)	Ye 6	Naghsh-e-Jahan Arena, Isfahan; Referees: Al-Zayyat & Awwad (JOR)
3 June 2023; 14:00	2× (suspension)	Report	3× (suspension)	Naghsh-e-Jahan Arena, Isfahan; Referees: Al-Zayyat & Awwad (JOR)

3 June 2023; 18:00	Al-Kuwait SC	35–38	(Qatar) Al-Duhail SC	Naghsh-e-Jahan Arena, Isfahan; Referees: Nachevski & Nikolov (MKD)
3 June 2023; 18:00	Al-Gharabballi & Marzo 7	(18–20)	Heiba & Tokuda 6	Naghsh-e-Jahan Arena, Isfahan; Referees: Nachevski & Nikolov (MKD)
3 June 2023; 18:00	2× (yellow card) 2× (suspension)	Report	2× (suspension) 2× (red card)	Naghsh-e-Jahan Arena, Isfahan; Referees: Nachevski & Nikolov (MKD)

5 June 2023; 10:00	Shahid Shameli Kazeroon (Iran)	33–36	(Bahrain) Al-Najma	Naghsh-e-Jahan Arena, Isfahan; Referees: Hideki & Tetsuro (JPN)
5 June 2023; 10:00	Esteki 9	(15–23)	Morales 5	Naghsh-e-Jahan Arena, Isfahan; Referees: Hideki & Tetsuro (JPN)
5 June 2023; 10:00	3× (suspension) 1× (red card)	Report	3× (suspension)	Naghsh-e-Jahan Arena, Isfahan; Referees: Hideki & Tetsuro (JPN)

5 June 2023; 12:00	Al-Duhail SC (Qatar)	40–26	(China) Junior Club	Naghsh-e-Jahan Arena, Isfahan; Referees: Al-Wahibi & Al-Shahi (OMA)
5 June 2023; 12:00	Khaled 10	(20–15)	Zhang 6	Naghsh-e-Jahan Arena, Isfahan; Referees: Al-Wahibi & Al-Shahi (OMA)
5 June 2023; 12:00	1× (suspension)	Report	1× (suspension)	Naghsh-e-Jahan Arena, Isfahan; Referees: Al-Wahibi & Al-Shahi (OMA)

5 June 2023; 14:00	RKOR Tashkent (Uzbekistan)	30–37	Al-Kuwait SC	Naghsh-e-Jahan Arena, Isfahan; Referees: Al-Zayyat & Awwad (JOR)
5 June 2023; 14:00	Joldasbayev & Sedinkin 7	(14–20)	Yaqoub 11	Naghsh-e-Jahan Arena, Isfahan; Referees: Al-Zayyat & Awwad (JOR)
5 June 2023; 14:00	4× (suspension)	Report	7× (suspension) 1× (red card)	Naghsh-e-Jahan Arena, Isfahan; Referees: Al-Zayyat & Awwad (JOR)

6 June 2023; 10:00	Al-Kuwait SC	41–37	(China) Junior Club	Naghsh-e-Jahan Arena, Isfahan
6 June 2023; 10:00		(21–16)		Naghsh-e-Jahan Arena, Isfahan
6 June 2023; 10:00		Report		Naghsh-e-Jahan Arena, Isfahan

6 June 2023; 12:00	Al-Duhail SC (Qatar)	29–23	(Iran) Shahid Shameli Kazeroon	Naghsh-e-Jahan Arena, Isfahan
6 June 2023; 12:00		(15–9)		Naghsh-e-Jahan Arena, Isfahan
6 June 2023; 12:00		Report		Naghsh-e-Jahan Arena, Isfahan

6 June 2023; 16:00	Al-Najma (Bahrain)	44–28	(Uzbekistan) RKOR Tashkent	Naghsh-e-Jahan Arena, Isfahan
6 June 2023; 16:00		(19–15)		Naghsh-e-Jahan Arena, Isfahan
6 June 2023; 16:00		Report		Naghsh-e-Jahan Arena, Isfahan

== Knockout stage ==
=== Bracket ===
Semifinals
A1	(Qatar) Al-Rayyan SC	29
B2	(Bahrain) Al-Najma	31
B2	(Qatar) Al-Duhail SC	23
A2	(Kuwait) Kazma SC	19

Finals
B2	(Bahrain) Al-Najma	31
B1	(Qatar) Al-Duhail SC	30
Third place
A1	(Qatar) Al-Rayyan SC	33
A2	(Kuwait) Kazma SC	26

=== Semifinals ===
8 June 2023; 15:00	Al-Rayyan SC (Qatar)	29–31	(Bahrain) Al-Najma	Naghsh-e-Jahan Arena, Isfahan
8 June 2023; 15:00		Report		Naghsh-e-Jahan Arena, Isfahan

8 June 2023; 17:00	Al-Duhail SC (Qatar)	23–19	(Kuwait) Kazma SC	Naghsh-e-Jahan Arena, Isfahan
8 June 2023; 17:00		Report		Naghsh-e-Jahan Arena, Isfahan

=== Ninth place game ===
9 June 2023; 13:00	T-Sports Club (India)	0–10	(China) Junior Club	Naghsh-e-Jahan Arena, Isfahan
9 June 2023; 13:00		Report		Naghsh-e-Jahan Arena, Isfahan

=== Seventh place game ===
9 June 2023; 15:00	Oman Club	30–29	(Iran) Shahid Shameli Kazeroon	Naghsh-e-Jahan Arena, Isfahan
9 June 2023; 15:00		Report		Naghsh-e-Jahan Arena, Isfahan

=== Fifth place game ===
9 June 2023; 17:00	Foolad Mobarakeh Sepahan (Iran)	32–33	Al-Kuwait SC	Naghsh-e-Jahan Arena, Isfahan
9 June 2023; 17:00		Report		Naghsh-e-Jahan Arena, Isfahan

=== Third place game ===
10 June 2023; 15:00	Al-Rayyan SC (Qatar)	33-26	(Kuwait) Kazma SC	Naghsh-e-Jahan Arena, Isfahan
10 June 2023; 15:00		Report		Naghsh-e-Jahan Arena, Isfahan

=== Final ===
10 June 2023; 17:00	Al-Najma (Bahrain)	31-30	(Qatar) Al-Duhail SC	Naghsh-e-Jahan Arena, Isfahan
10 June 2023; 17:00		Report		Naghsh-e-Jahan Arena, Isfahan

== Final standings ==
Rank	Team
Gold medal	(Bahrain) Al-Najma
Silver medal	(Qatar) Al-Duhail SC
Bronze medal	(Qatar) Al-Rayyan SC
4	(Kuwait) Kazma SC
5	Al-Kuwait SC
6	(Iran) Foolad Mobarakeh Sepahan
7	Oman Club
8	(Iran) Shahid Shameli Kazeroon
9	(China) Junior Club
10	(India) T-Sports Club
11	(Uzbekistan) RKOR Tashkent

Team qualified for the 2023 IHF Men's Super Globe
