= Argentine Handball Confederation =

Governing body of handball and beach handball in the Argentine Republic

Argentine Handball Confederation Spanish: Confederación Argentina de Handball CAH
- IOC nation: Argentina (ARG)
- Sport: Handball
- Other sports: Beach handball
- Official website: www.handballargentina.org

HISTORY
- Year of formation: 15 October 1921; 103 years ago

AFFILIATIONS
- International federation: International Handball Federation (IHF)
- IHF member since: 1954
- Continental association: South and Central America Handball Confederation (SCAHC)
- National Olympic Committee: Argentine Olympic Committee
- Other affiliation(s): Ente Nacional de Alto Rendimiento Deportivo

GOVERNING BODY
- President: Mario Moccia

HEADQUARTERS
- Address: Esmeralda 1075 3°38 caba, Ciudad Autonoma de Buenos Aires
- Country: Argentina
- Secretary General: Martín Gerardo Bonjour

FINANCE
- Sponsors: Banco Nación; Molten Corporation; Hummel International

The Argentine Handball Confederation (CAH) (Spanish: Confederación Argentina de Handball) is the governing body of handball and beach handball in the Argentine Republic. Founded on 15 October 1921, CAH is affiliated to the International Handball Federation and the South and Central America Handball Confederation. CAH is also affiliated to the Argentine Olympic Committee. It is based in Buenos Aires.

== National Tournament ==
Year	Name	Team
1977	Clubes Campeones	San Lorenzo Rusell Mza
1978	Clubes Campeones	SAG Ballester
1979	Clubes Campeones	SAG Ballester
1980	Clubes Campeones	SAG Ballester
1981	Clubes Campeones	SAG Ballester
1982	Clubes Campeones	SAG Ballester
1983	Clubes Campeones	River Plate
1984	Clubes Campeones	River Plate
1985	Clubes Campeones	Ferro C. Oeste
1986	Clubes Campeones	Ferro C. Oeste
1987	Torneo Nacional	NS Luján
1988	Torneo Nacional	Ferro C. Oeste
1989	Torneo Nacional	SAG Ballester
1990	Torneo Nacional	NS Luján
1991	Torneo Nacional	SEDALO
1992	Torneo Nacional	SEDALO
1993	Torneo Nacional	NS Luján
1994	Torneo Nacional	NS Luján
1995	Torneo Nacional	NS Luján
1996	Torneo Nacional	NS Luján
1997	Torneo Nacional	NS Luján
1998	Torneo Nacional	NS Luján
1999	Liga Federal	River Plate
2000	Liga Federal	NS Luján
2001	Liga Federal	NS Luján
2002	Torneo Nacional	SAG Ballester
2003	Torneo Nacional	River Plate
2004	Torneo Nacional	AACF Quilmes
2005	Torneo Nacional	River Plate
2006	Torneo Nacional	River Plate
2007	Liga Nacional	Forjar Córdoba
2007	Torneo Nacional	River Plate
2008	Torneo Nacional	River Plate
2009	Torneo Nacional	River Plate
2010	Torneo Nacional	River Plate
2011	Torneo Nacional	River Plate
2012	Torneo Nacional	SAG Ballester
2013	Torneo Nacional	Colegio Ward
2014	Torneo Nacional	River Plate
2015	Torneo Nacional	SAG Ballester
2016	Torneo Nacional	UNLu
2017	Torneo Nacional	SAG Ballester
