= Federico Pizarro (handballer) =

Argentine handball player

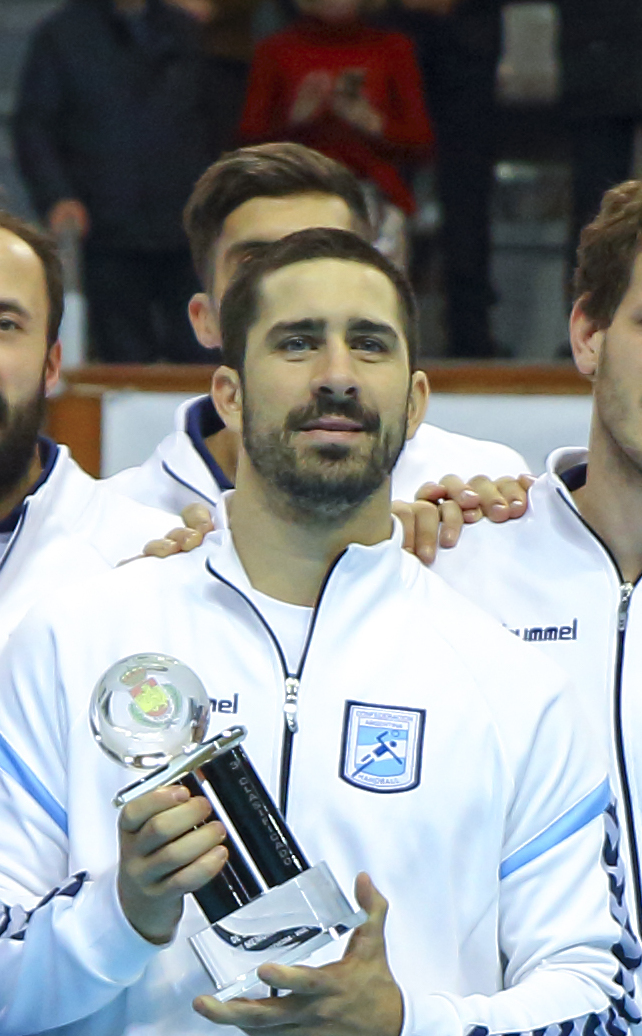

Personal information
- Born: 7 September 1986 (age 40) Buenos Aires, Argentina
- Height: 1.83 m (6 ft 0 in)

Sport
- Sport: Handball
- Position: Right wing
- Current club: UNLu
National team
Years	Team	Apps	(Gls)
–	Argentina	132	(592)
Medal record
Pan American Games
Gold medal – first place	2011 Guadalajara	Team
Gold medal – first place	2019 Lima	Team
Gold medal – first place	2023 Santiago	Team
Silver medal – second place	2007 Rio de Janeiro	Team
Silver medal – second place	2015 Toronto	Team
Pan American Championship
Gold medal – first place	2018 Greenland
Bronze medal – third place	2016 Argentina
South and Central American Championship
Gold medal – first place	2020 Brazil
Silver medal – second place	2022 Brazil
Silver medal – second place	2024 Argentina
South American Games
Gold medal – first place	2022 Asunción	Team
Silver medal – second place	2018 Cochabamba	Team

Federico Pizarro (born 7 September 1986) is an Argentine handball player for UNLu and the Argentina men's national handball team.

He defended Argentina at the 2012 Summer Olympics in London. He participated at the 2015 World Men's Handball Championship in Qatar.

== Individual awards and achievements ==
- Torneo Nacional de Clubes 2016: Best right back
- 2016 Pan American Men's Club Handball Championship: Best right back
- 2016 Pan American Men's Club Handball Championship: MVP
- 2016 Pan American Men's Club Handball Championship: Top scorer
- Torneo Nacional de Clubes 2017: Top scorer
