= Liga Nacional de Handebol 2016 =

2016 Liga Nacional de Handebol

Tournament details
- Host country: Brazil

Final positions
- Champions: (São Paulo (state)) Handebol Taubaté (4th title)
- Runners-up: (São Paulo (state)) EC Pinheiros
- Third place: (São Paulo (state)) Handebol São Caetano
- Fourth place: (Paraná (state)) Handebol Maringá

Tournament statistics
- Top scorers: Arthur Pereira (BRA) (69 goals)

Awards
- Best player: Leonardo Dutra (BRA)

The Liga Nacional de Handebol 2016 (2016 National Handball League) was the 20th season of the top tier Brazilian handball national competitions for clubs. It is organized by the Brazilian Handball Confederation. This season, for the third time, Handebol Taubaté was crowned champion.

== Teams qualified for the play-offs stage ==
South Southeast Conference

- (São Paulo (state)) Handebol Taubaté
- (São Paulo (state)) EC Pinheiros
- (São Paulo (state)) Handebol São Caetano
- (Paraná (state)) Handebol Maringá

Northeastern Conference

- (Maranhão) Hollanda Codó
- (Ceará) Maracanã Handebol

Northern Conference

- (Amazonas (Brazilian state)) Adalberto Valle
- (Pará) Clube do Remo

== Play-offs ==
Quarter-finals
(São Paulo (state))	Handebol Taubaté	47	33	80
(Pará)	Clube do Remo	20	21	41
(Paraná (state))	Handebol Maringá	31	32	63
(Maranhão)	Hollanda Codó	22	30	52
(São Paulo (state))	Handebol São Caetano	37	31	68
(Amazonas (Brazilian state))	Adalberto Valle	20	20	40
(São Paulo (state))	EC Pinheiros	41	39	80
(Ceará)	Maracanã Handebol	13	18	31

Semi-finals
(São Paulo (state))	Handebol Taubaté	25	20	45
(Paraná (state))	Handebol Maringá	20	17	37
(São Paulo (state))	Handebol São Caetano	25	28	53
(São Paulo (state))	EC Pinheiros	34	25	59

Final
(São Paulo (state))	Handebol Taubaté	26
(São Paulo (state))	EC Pinheiros	20
Third place
(Paraná (state))	Handebol Maringá	21
(São Paulo (state))	Handebol São Caetano	29

== Final Match ==
December 11; 13:00	Handebol Taubaté (São Paulo (state))	26–20	(São Paulo (state)) EC Pinheiros	Ginásio Adib Moyses Dib, São Bernardo do Campo
December 11; 13:00	Santos, Bomfim 4	(11–10)	Dutra, Silveira 5	Ginásio Adib Moyses Dib, São Bernardo do Campo
December 11; 13:00		Report		Ginásio Adib Moyses Dib, São Bernardo do Campo

== Individual awards ==
- Best Player: (Brazil) Leonardo Dutra
- Top Scorer: (Brazil) Arthur Pereira
- Best Goalkeeper: (Brazil) Marcos Paulo Santos
