= South and Central American Men's Club Handball Championship =

Handball Championship

- First season: 2019
- No. of teams: 16
- Confederation: SCAHC (South America/Central America)
- Most recent champion: (Brazil) EC Pinheiros (2026)
- Most titles: (Brazil) Handebol Taubaté (4 titles)
- Level on pyramid: 1
- Website: https://handballsca.tv/
- 2026

The South and Central Men's Club Handball Championship, organized by the South and Central America Handball Confederation, is the official competition for men's handball clubs of South and Central America qualifying the champion of the competition to the IHF Super Globe. The competition was established in 2019.

== Summaries ==
Year	Host	Final			Third place match		
Year	Host	Champion	Score	Runner-up	Third place	Score	Fourth place
2019; Details	(Brazil); Taubaté	(Brazil); Handebol Taubaté	27–21	(Argentina); UNLu (Today San Fernando HB)	(Brazil); EC Pinheiros	31–22	(Argentina); SAG Villa Ballester
2021; Details	(Brazil); Taubaté	(Brazil); EC Pinheiros	No playoffs	(Brazil); Handebol Taubaté	(Brazil); Nacional Handebol Clube	No playoffs	(Paraguay); Club Olimpia
2022; Details	(Argentina); Buenos Aires	(Brazil); Handebol Taubaté	27–20	(Brazil); EC Pinheiros	(Argentina); San Fernando HB	28–25	(Argentina); SAG Villa Ballester
2023; Details	(Brazil); São Paulo	(Argentina); San Fernando HB	35–33 (ET)	(Brazil); Handebol Taubaté	(Brazil); EC Pinheiros	33–27	(Brazil); Handebol Cascavel
2024; Details	(Brazil); Taubaté	(Brazil); Handebol Taubaté	29–27	(Brazil); EC Pinheiros	(Brazil); Nacional Handebol Clube	37–35	(Argentina); San Fernando HB
2025; Details	Santiago de Chile	(Brazil); Handebol Taubaté	22–20	(Brazil); EC Pinheiros	(Brazil); FMO/Clube Português	37–35	(Argentina); Dorrego HB
2026; Details	(Paraguay); Asunción	(Brazil); EC Pinheiros	29–27	(Brazil); Nacional Handebol Clube	(Argentina); Argentinos Juniors HB	26–24	(Brazil); FMO Português

== Medal table ==
=== Per Club ===
Rank	Club	Gold	Silver	Bronze	Total
1	(Brazil) Handebol Taubaté	4	2	0	6
2	(Brazil) EC Pinheiros	2	3	2	7
3	(Argentina) San Fernando HB	1	1	1	3
4	(Brazil) Nacional Handebol Clube	0	1	2	3
5	(Argentina) Argentinos Juniors HB	0	0	1	1
5	(Brazil) FMO/Clube Português	0	0	1	1
Totals (6 entries)		7	7	7	21

=== Per Nation ===
Rank	Nation	Gold	Silver	Bronze	Total
1	Brazil	6	6	5	17
2	Argentina	1	1	2	4
Totals (2 entries)		7	7	7	21
