= Cleryston Novais =

Brazilian handball player (born 1992)

Personal information
- Full name: Cleryston David Novais
- Nationality: Brazilian
- Born: 15 October 1992 (age 34)
- Height: 1.80 m (5 ft 11 in)

Sport
- Sport: Handball
- Position: Left wing
- Current club: Beykoz Belediyespor
National team
Years	Team	Apps	(Gls)
–	Brazil	29	(36)

Cleryston David Novais (born 15 October 1992) is a Brazilian handball player for Beykoz Belediyespor and the Brazilian national team.

He participated in the 2017 World Men's Handball Championship.
