= Torneo Nacional de Clubes 2015 =

2015 Torneo Nacional de Clubes
Tournament details
- Host country: Argentina
- Venues: 2 (in 1 host city)
- Dates: 09–13 September
- Teams: 8

Final positions
- Champions: SAG Villa Ballester (9th title)
- Runners-up: River Plate
- Third place: AACF Quilmes
- Fourth place: Colegio Escuela Pías

Tournament statistics
- Matches played: 20
- Goals scored: 1,056 (52.8 per match)
- Top scorers: (Argentina) Julian Souto (31 goals)

The Torneo Nacional de Clubes 2015 (2015 Clubs National Tournament) was the 40th edition of the main clubs handball tournament organised by the Confederación Argentina de Handball, it was held between 09 and 13 September.

== Groups Stage ==
=== Group A ===
Team	Pld	W	D	L	GF	GA	GD
River Plate	3	3	0	0	106	69	37
AACF Quilmes	3	2	0	1	80	64	16
Municipalidad de Maipú	3	1	0	2	80	93	-13
CTF Bahía Blanca	3	0	0	3	55	95	-40

=== Group B ===
Team	Pld	W	D	L	GF	GA	GD
SAG Villa Ballester	3	3	0	0	93	59	34
Colegio Escuela Pías	3	2	0	1	92	68	24
CISD Nueva Generación	3	1	0	2	66	48	-18
EM Handball Cervantes	3	0	0	3	57	97	-40

Teams qualified to the semi-finals

== Knockout stage ==
=== Championship bracket ===
Semifinals
12 September
River Plate	34
Colegio Escuela Pías	22
12 September
SAG Villa Ballester	25
AACF Quilmes	22

Final
13 September
River Plate	24
SAG Villa Ballester	28
Third place game
13 September
AACF Quilmes	25
Colegio Escuela Pías	21

=== 5–8th place bracket ===
Semifinals
12 September
Municipalidad de Maipú	34
EM Handball Cervantes	20
12 September
CTF Bahía Blanca	21
CISD Nueva Generación	34

Fifth place game
12 September
Municipalidad de Maipú	35
CISD Nueva Generación	32
Seventh place game
12 September
EM Handball Cervantes	17
CTF Bahía Blanca	23

== Final ==
13 september 2015; 12:00	River Plate	24–28	SAG Villa Ballester	Estadio Gorki Grana, Morón, Buenos Aires; Referees: Lenci, Grillo (ARG)
13 september 2015; 12:00	Lima 7	(14–15)	Souto 11	Estadio Gorki Grana, Morón, Buenos Aires; Referees: Lenci, Grillo (ARG)
13 september 2015; 12:00	3× (yellow card) 5× (suspension)	Report	3× (yellow card) 2× (suspension)	Estadio Gorki Grana, Morón, Buenos Aires; Referees: Lenci, Grillo (ARG)

== Final standing ==
Rank	Team
1	SAG Villa Ballester
2	River Plate
3	AACF Quilmes
4	Colegio Escuela Pías
5	Municipalidad de Maipú
6	CISD Nueva Generación
7	CTF Bahía Blanca
8	EM Handball Cervantes

Team qualified to the 2016 Pan American Men's Club Handball Championship
