= Edney Silva =

Brazilian association football player (born 2004)

Personal information
- Full name: Edney Henrique Santos da Silva
- Date of birth: 26 July 2004 (age 22)
- Place of birth: Bahia, Brazil
- Height: 1.75 m (5 ft 9 in)
- Position: Full-back

Team information
- Current team: Portimonense (on loan from Santa Clara)
- Number: 2

Youth career
- Confiança
- –2022: São Caetano
- 2022–2025: Palmeiras

Senior career*
Years	Team	Apps	(Gls)
2025–	Santa Clara	2	(0)
2025–	→ Portimonense (loan)	33	(1)
- * Club domestic league appearances and goals as of 12 September 2026

Edney Henrique Santos da Silva (born 26 July 2004) is a Brazilian professional footballer who plays as a full-back for Liga Portugal 2 club Portimonense on loan from Santa Clara.

== Career ==
He was born in Bahia, and plays at full-back, although at the start of his youth career he had initially played as a striker. He was a youth player at Confiança and São Caetano prior to featuring for Palmeiras U20. He initially played for Palmeiras U20 on a loan agreement before his permanent transfer to Palmeiras was authorised by a Brazilian court in order to help São Caetano pay off their creditors. He helped Palmeiras to win the Copinha in 2023, as well as the U-20 Brasileirão (2022) and the U-20 Copa do Brasil (2022). For Palmeiras from 2022 until 2025, he appeared in 101 matches at youth level in total, scoring six goals.

He joined C.D. Santa Clara of the Portuguese Primeira Liga on the final day of the winter transfer window in January 2025, agreeing a two and-a-half year contract into 2027. He made his debut for the Santa Clara first team on 10 May 2025 at the age of 20 years-old, when he replaced Diogo Calila in the 30th minute of their penultimate league match of the 2024-25 season against F.C. Famalicão in a 2-1 home win.

On 9 September 2025, Edney was sent on a season-long loan to Liga Portugal 2 club Portimonense.
