= Juan Pablo Fernández =

Argentine handball player

Personal information
- Born: 30 September 1988 (age 38) Tigre, Argentina
- Height: 1.92 m (6 ft 4 in)

Sport
- Sport: Handball
- Position: Centre back
- Current club: San Fernando Handball
National team
Years	Team	Apps	(Gls)
–	Argentina	128	(166)
Medal record
Pan American Games
Gold medal – first place	2011 Guadalajara	Team
Silver medal – second place	2015 Toronto	Team
Pan American Championship
Gold medal – first place	2018 Greenland

Juan Pablo Fernández (born 30 September 1988) is an Argentine handball player for San Fernando Handball and the Argentina men's national handball team.

He defended Argentina at the 2015 World Men's Handball Championship in Qatar.

His brother, Federico, defended Argentina at the Summer Olympics.

== Club Titles ==
- 2023 South and Central American Men's Club Handball Championship

== Individual awards and achievements ==
- Torneo Nacional de Clubes 2016: Best left back
