= Federico Gastón Fernández =

Argentine handball player

Federico Fernández
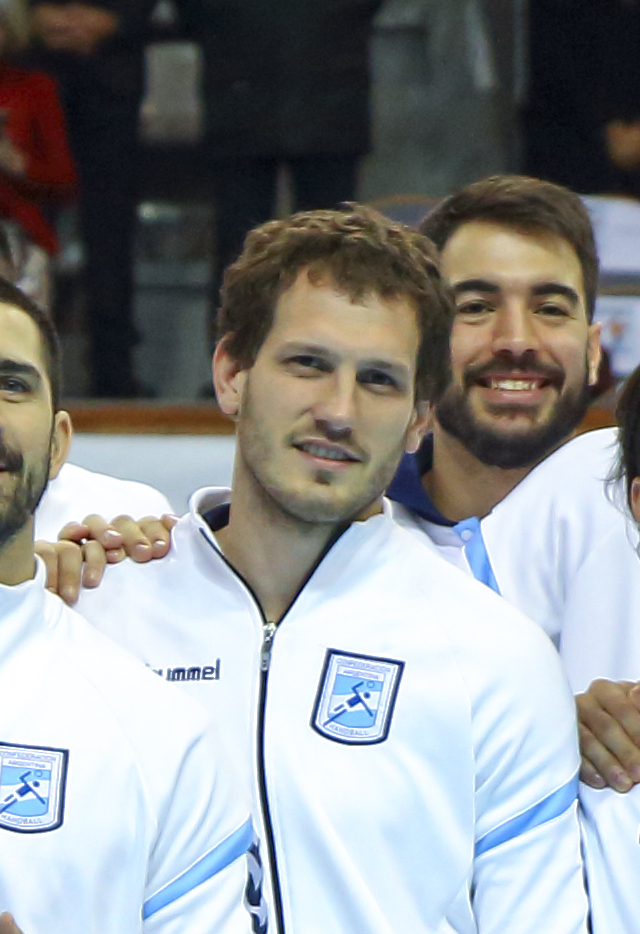

Personal information
- Full name: Federico Gastón Fernández
- Born: 17 October 1989 (age 37) Buenos Aires, Argentina
- Height: 1.91 m (6 ft 3 in)

Sport
- Sport: Handball
- Position: Left wing
- Current club: San Fernando Handball
National team
Years	Team	Apps	(Gls)
–	Argentina	157	(585)
Medal record
Pan American Games
Gold medal – first place	2011 Guadalajara	Team
Gold medal – first place	2019 Lima	Team
Gold medal – first place	2023 Santiago	Team
Silver medal – second place	2015 Toronto	Team
Pan American Championship
Gold medal – first place	2018 Greenland
Bronze medal – third place	2016 Argentina
South and Central American Championship
Gold medal – first place	2020 Brazil
Silver medal – second place	2022 Brazil
Silver medal – second place	2024 Argentina
South American Games
Gold medal – first place	2022 Asunción	Team
Silver medal – second place	2018 Cochabamba	Team

Federico Gastón Fernández (born 17 October 1989) is an Argentine handball player for San Fernando Handball and the Argentina men's national handball team.

He represented Argentina at the 2012 London Summer Olympics and the 2015 World Men's Handball Championship in Qatar. His brother, Juan Pablo, represented Argentina at the 2016 Olympics.

== Club Titles ==
- 2023 South and Central American Men's Club Handball Championship

== Individual achiviements ==
- 2018 International Tournament of Spain: Top scorer
- 2018 Pan American Men's Handball Championship: Best left wing
- 2022 South and Central American Men's Club Handball Championship: Top scorer
