= Mariano Cánepa =

Argentine handball player

Personal information
- Born: 7 May 1987 (age 39) Buenos Aires, Argentina
- Height: 187 cm (74 in)

Sport
- Sport: Handball
- Position: Pivot
- Current club: Villa Ballester

Senior clubs
- Years: Team
- 2006-: SAG Villa Ballester
National team
Years	Team	Apps	(Gls)
2007	Argentina	89	(125)
Medal record
Pan American Games
Gold medal – first place	2023 Santiago	Team
Pan American Championship
Bronze medal – third place	2016 Argentina
South and Central American Championship
Silver medal – second place	2024 Argentina
South American Games
Gold medal – first place	2022 Asunción	Team
- Updated on 5 November 2023

Mariano Andres Cánepa (born 7 May 1987) is an Argentine handball player for Villa Ballester. He played for Argentina at the 2011 World Men's Handball Championship, and at the 2012 London Summer Olympics.

== Achievements ==
- South and Central American Men's Club Handball Championship:
  - 2023
- Argentine League
  - 2015, 2017

== Individual awards and achievements ==
- Torneo Nacional de Clubes 2016: Best Pivot
