= San Fernando Handball =

Argentine handball club

- Full name: San Fernando Handball
- Founded: 1972; 53 years ago
- Head coach: Elio Fernández
- League: Campeonato Nacional de Clubes
- 2022: Champion
- Club colours
Home	Away

San Fernando Handball is a handball club from San Fernando, Argentina. Currently, they compete in the Femebal and the Campeonato Nacional de Clubes and is the current champion.

== History ==
The club was found 1972 as INEF Manuel Belgrano de San Fernando. Between 16 March 2009 and 1 July 2010 they chanced the name to UNLu. UNLu was short for Universidad Nacional de Luján. In May 2020 they renamed again to the today name San Fernando Handball.

== Accomplishments ==
=== Men's Team ===
Season	World	Continental *1)	National	Metropolitano	Super 4
1992	Did not exist	Cancelled due to the lack of hosts	?	Gold	Did not exist
1993	Did not exist	Cancelled due to the lack of hosts	?	Gold	Did not exist
1994–2010	Did not exist until 1997, later Did not Qualify	Did not qualify	?	?	Did not exist until 2005, later ?
2011	Did not qualify	Did not qualify	Gold (Division C)	?	?
2012-2014	Did not qualify	Did not qualify	?	?	?
2015 Apertura	Did not qualify	Did not qualify	?	Gold	Bronze
2015 Clausura	Did not qualify	Did not qualify	?	?	Bronze
2016 Apertura	Did not qualify	Did not qualify	Gold	Silver	Gold
2016 Clausura	Did not qualify	Did not qualify	Gold	Gold	Gold
2017 Apertura	Did not qualify	(bronze) Bronze	Bronze	Gold	Silver
2017 Clausura	Did not qualify	(bronze) Bronze	Bronze	Gold	Silver
2018 Apertura	Did not qualify	Did not qualify	Gold	Silver	Gold
2018 Clausura	Did not qualify	Did not qualify	Gold	Silver	Gold
2019 Apertura	Did not qualify	(silver) Silver	Gold	Gold	Silver
2019 Clausura	Did not qualify	(silver) Silver	Gold	Bronze	Silver
2020 Apertura	Cancelled due to the COVID-19 pandemic			?	?
2020 Clausura	Cancelled due to the COVID-19 pandemic			?	?
2021 Apertura	Did not qualify	Did not participated	Gold	?	?
2021 Clausura	Did not qualify	Did not participated	Gold	Silver	?
2022 Apertura	Did not qualify	(bronze) Bronze	Gold	?	?
2022 Clausura	Did not qualify	(bronze) Bronze	Gold	?	?
2023 Apertura	11th	(gold) Gold	TBD	TBD	TBD
2023 Clausura	11th	(gold) Gold	TBD	TBD	TBD

- 1) The continental championship chanced over the years:
  - 1983–2001: South American Men's Club Handball Championship
  - 2007–2018: Pan American Men's Club Handball Championship
  - Since 2019: South and Central American Men's Club Handball Championship
- Apertura: Spring season
- Clausura: Fall season

=== Women's Team ===
- Metropolitano
  - 1994, 1995, 1996, 1997

== Team ==
=== Current squad ===
Squad for the 2023 South and Central American Championship

- (Argentina) Lautaro Rodriguez
- (Argentina) Federico Gastón Fernández
- (Argentina) Tomas Noto
- (Argentina) Kevin Urban
- (Argentina) Mariano Betancourt
- (Argentina) Mariano Cánepa
- (Argentina) Sebastian Fernández
- (Argentina) Ezequiel Gimenez
- (Argentina) Juan Pablo Fernández
- (Argentina) Patricio Orlandi
- (Argentina) Patricio Verdino
- (Argentina) Juan Noto
- (Argentina) Nicolas Vella
- (Argentina) Augustin Batistela
- (Argentina) Ricardo Fallati
- (Argentina) Fernando Dieguez
- (Argentina) Guido Ricobelli
