= Noelia Artigas =

Uruguayan handball player (born 1989)

Noelia Artigas Pizzo
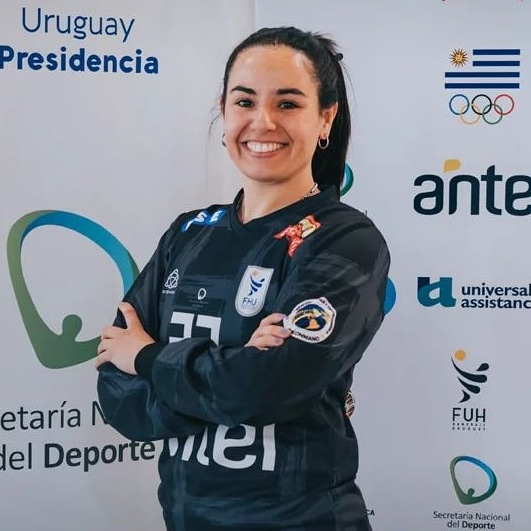

Personal information
- Nationality: Uruguayan
- Born: 4 June 1989 (age 37) Montevideo, Uruguay
- Height: 165 m (541 ft)

Sport
- Sport: Handball
- Position: Goalkeeper
- Current club: Scuola Italiana di Montevideo (Uruguay)

Senior clubs
- Years: Team
- 2002-2008: Club Unión Santa Rosa Shangrilá, Uruguay
- 2008-2010: Club Náutico; Uruguay
- 2010-2012: Hebraica Macabi, Uruguay
- 2013-2024: Scuola Italiana Di Montevideo, Uruguay
- 2024-2025: Ariosto Pallamano, Italy
- 2025: Scuola Italiana Di Montevideo, Uruguay
National team
- Years: Team
- –: Uruguay

Noelia Beatriz Artigas Pizzo (born June 4, 1989, in Montevideo, Uruguay) is a Uruguayan handball player who currently plays for Scuola Italiana di Montevideo in Uruguay.

Video summary of the best saves from the 2024/2025 season.

== Career ==
Noelia Artigas is a handball goalkeeper who has represented Uruguay on numerous occasions.

She was part of the Uruguay women's national handball team that competed in the 2011 World Women's Handball Championship, where Uruguay made history by winning its first-ever match at a World Championship and achieving its best overall ranking in the tournament's history.

She also took part in Handball at the 2010 South American Games, where Uruguay won the bronze medal.

In 2018, she traveled to China with the Uruguay women's national handball team as part of a sports cooperation agreement between Uruguay and China. The team spent a month in Nanning for high-performance training and friendly matches, under the guidance of Chinese coaches. The program was part of Uruguay’s preparation for the Juegos Suramericanos, Cochabamba, 2018.

Between 2006 and 2012, she was a member of the Uruguay women's national beach handball team. During this period, she proudly represented the national team, participating in three World Championships: Río 2006, Cádiz 2008, and Omán 2012.
Notably, she competed in the 2012 Beach Handball World Championships, where Uruguay finished in sixth place—its best placement to date in the competition.

During her career in Uruguay, Artigas played for the Federación Uruguaya de Handball winning six consecutive national championships with her club Scuola Italiana di Montevideo between 2018 and 2023. Sources are

These titles earned her club a place in the last five editions of the South and Central American Women's Club Handball Championship: 2019, 2022, 2023, 2024 and 2025.

She was also nominated for the Charrúa Awards during the 2018–2019 season.

In August 2024, Artigas signed her first professional contract, joining Ariosto Pallamano in Italy for the 2024–2025 season.

In 2025, she competed in the Coppa Italia with Ariosto Pallamano and was nominated as the MVP in the quarter-final match against Salerno.

== Clubs ==
- 2025 Scuola Italiana Di Montevideo, Uruguay
- 2024-2025 Ariosto Pallamano, Italy
- 2013-2024 Scuola Italiana Di Montevideo, Uruguay
- 2010-2012 Hebraica Macabi, Uruguay
- 2008-2010 Club Náutico; Uruguay
- 2002-2008 Club Unión Santa Rosa Shangrilá, Uruguay

== International competitions ==
=== Uruguay women's national handball team ===
- 2021: Campeonato Sudamericano y Centroamericano de Balonmano Femenino, Asunción, 2021
- 2018: Juegos Suramericanos, Cochabamba, 2018
- 2017: Campeonato Panamericano de Balonmano Femenino, Bs As, 2017
- 2011: Juegos Panamericanos, Guadalajara, 2011
- 2011: 2011 World Women's Handball Championship
- 2011: Campeonato Panamericano de Balonmano Femenino, San Pablo, 2011
- 2010: Juegos Suramericanos, Medellín, 2010

=== Uruguay women's national beach handball team ===
- 2012: 2012 Beach Handball World Championships
- 2012: Campeonato Panamericano de Balonmano Playa, Montevideo, 2012
- 2009: Primeros Juegos Suramericanos de Playa, Uruguay, 2009
- 2008: 2008 Beach Handball World Championships
- 2008: Campeonato Panamericano de Balonmano Playa, Montevideo, 2008
- 2006: 2006 Beach Handball World Championships

=== Scuola Italiana Di Montevideo ===
- 2025: South and Central American Women's Club Handball Championship
- 2024: 2024 South and Central American Women's Club Handball Championship
- 2023: 2023 South and Central American Women's Club Handball Championship
- 2022: 2022 South and Central American Women's Club Handball Championship
- 2019: 2019 South and Central American Women's Club Handball Championship
