= 2023 South and Central American Junior Club Handball Championship =

Sport Tournament

Tournament details
- Host country: Brazil
- Venue(s): 2 (in 2 host cities)
- Dates: 5–9 September
- Teams: 10 (from 1 confederation)

Final positions
- Champions: (Brazil) Nacional Handebol Clube(men) (Chile) Ovalle Balonmano(women)
- Runner-up: (Argentina) Municipalidad de Tupungato(men) (Brazil) Seleção Catarinense(women)
- Third place: (Chile) Unión Machalí(men) (Brazil) Nacional Handebol Clube(women)
- Fourth place: (Brazil) Handebol Blumenau(men) (Uruguay) BBC Layva(women)

The 2023 South and Central American Junior Club Handball Championship, the first edition of this tournament, took place in São José and Florianópolis, Brazil from 5 to 9 September 2023.

== Participating teams ==
Men

- (Argentina) Municipalidad de Tupungato
- (Brazil) Handebol Blumenau
- (Brazil) Nacional Handebol Clube
- (Chile) Ovalle Balonmano
- (Chile) Unión Machalí

Women

- (Brazil) Nacional Handebol Clube
- (Brazil) Seleção Catarinense
- (Chile) CUBLA
- (Chile) Ovalle Balonmano
- (Uruguay) BBC Layva

== Men's tournament ==
=== Standings ===
Pos	Team	Pld	W	D	L	GF	GA	GD	Pts
1st place, gold medalist(s)	(Brazil) Nacional Handebol Clube (H)	4	4	0	0	137	92	+45	8
2nd place, silver medalist(s)	(Argentina) Municipalidad de Tupungato	4	3	0	1	123	112	+11	6
3rd place, bronze medalist(s)	(Chile) Unión Machalí	4	1	0	3	101	112	−11	2
4	(Brazil) Handebol Blumenau	4	1	0	3	91	113	−22	2
5	(Chile) Ovalle Balonmano	4	1	0	3	104	127	−23	2

Updated to match(es) played on unknown. Source:
Rules for classification: 1) Points; 2) Head-to-head points; 3) Head-to-head goal difference; 4) Head-to-head goals scored; 5) Goal difference; 6) Goals scored; 7) Draw.
(H) Hosts

=== Results ===
All times are local (UTC−3).

5 September 2023; 14:00	Unión Machalí (Chile)	24–35	(Argentina) Municipalidad de Tupungato	Arena multiuso, São José

5 September 2023; 20:00	Nacional Handebol Clube (Brazil)	35–19	(Brazil) Handebol Blumenau	Arena multiuso, São José

6 September 2023; 14:00	Municipalidad de Tupungato (Argentina)	36–32	(Chile) Ovalle Balonmano	Arena multiuso, São José

6 September 2023; 18:00	Handebol Blumenau (Brazil)	18–25	(Chile) Unión Machalí	Arena multiuso, São José

7 September 2023; 16:00	Municipalidad de Tupungato (Argentina)	29–24	(Brazil) Handebol Blumenau	Ginásio SEST SENAT, Florianópolis

7 September 2023; 20:00	Nacional Handebol Clube (Brazil)	37–22	(Chile) Ovalle Balonmano	Ginásio SEST SENAT, Florianópolis

8 September 2023; 16:00	Nacional Handebol Clube (Brazil)	32–23	(Argentina) Municipalidad de Tupungato	Ginásio SEST SENAT, Florianópolis

8 September 2023; 18:00	Unión Machalí (Chile)	24–26	(Chile) Ovalle Balonmano	Ginásio SEST SENAT, Florianópolis

9 September 2023; 13:00	Handebol Blumenau (Brazil)	30–24	(Chile) Ovalle Balonmano	Ginásio SEST SENAT, Florianópolis

9 September 2023; 19:00	Unión Machalí (Chile)	28–33	(Brazil) Nacional Handebol Clube	Ginásio SEST SENAT, Florianópolis

== Women's tournament ==
=== Standings ===
Pos	Team	Pld	W	D	L	GF	GA	GD	Pts
1st place, gold medalist(s)	(Chile) Ovalle Balonmano	4	3	0	1	125	98	+27	6
2nd place, silver medalist(s)	(Brazil) Seleção Catarinense (H)	4	2	0	2	109	117	−8	4
3rd place, bronze medalist(s)	(Brazil) Nacional Handebol Clube (H)	4	2	0	2	125	111	+14	4
4	(Uruguay) BBC Layva	4	2	0	2	89	95	−6	4
5	(Chile) CUBLA	4	1	0	3	89	116	−27	2

Updated to match(es) played on unknown. Source:
Rules for classification: 1) Points; 2) Head-to-head points; 3) Head-to-head goal difference; 4) Head-to-head goals scored; 5) Goal difference; 6) Goals scored; 7) Draw.
(H) Hosts

=== Results ===
All times are local (UTC−3).

5 September 2023; 16:00	CUBLA (Chile)	28–27	(Brazil) Seleção Catarinense	Arena multiuso, São José

5 September 2023; 18:00	BBC Layva (Uruguay)	21–20	(Chile) Ovalle Balonmano	Arena multiuso, São José

6 September 2023; 16:00	CUBLA (Chile)	17–21	(Uruguay) BBC Layva	Arena multiuso, São José

6 September 2023; 20:00	Nacional Handebol Clube (Brazil)	30–38	(Chile) Ovalle Balonmano	Arena multiuso, São José

7 September 2023; 14:00	Nacional Handebol Clube (Brazil)	30–31	(Brazil) Seleção Catarinense	Ginásio SEST SENAT, Florianópolis

7 September 2023; 18:00	CUBLA (Chile)	25–32	(Chile) Ovalle Balonmano	Ginásio SEST SENAT, Florianópolis

8 September 2023; 14:00	Ovalle Balonmano (Chile)	35–22	(Brazil) Seleção Catarinense	Ginásio SEST SENAT, Florianópolis

8 September 2023; 20:00	BBC Layva (Uruguay)	23–29	(Brazil) Nacional Handebol Clube	Ginásio SEST SENAT, Florianópolis

9 September 2023; 15:00	Seleção Catarinense (Brazil)	29–24	(Uruguay) BBC Layva	Ginásio SEST SENAT, Florianópolis

9 September 2023; 17:00	Nacional Handebol Clube (Brazil)	36–19	(Chile) CUBLA	Ginásio SEST SENAT, Florianópolis
