= 2022 South and Central American Women's Club Handball Championship =

Tournament details
- Host country: Argentina
- Venue(s): 1 (in 1 host city)
- Dates: 30 May–5 June
- Teams: 10 (from 1 confederation)

Final positions
- Champions: (Brazil) EC Pinheiros (1st title)
- Runner-up: (Brazil) Clube Português
- Third place: (Argentina) River Plate
- Fourth place: (Argentina) Ferro Carril Oeste

Tournament statistics
- Matches played: 29
- Goals scored: 1,461 (50.38 per match)
- Top scorer(s): Gabriela Müller (44 goals)

The 2022 South and Central American Women's Club Handball Championship the 2nd edition of this tournament was held in Buenos Aires, Argentina from 30 May to 5 June 2022.

== Participating teams ==
- (Argentina) Ferro Carril Oeste
- (Argentina) CID Moreno
- (Argentina) River Plate
- (Brazil) Clube Português
- (Brazil) EC Pinheiros
- (Chile) Club Italiano BM
- (Chile) Ovalle Balonmano
- (Paraguay) Cerro Porteño
- (Uruguay) Scuola Italiana di Montevideo
- (Uruguay) BBC Layva

== Preliminary round ==
All times are local (UTC–3).

=== Group A ===
Pos	Team	Pld	W	D	L	GF	GA	GD	Pts	Qualification
1	(Brazil) Clube Português	4	3	1	0	109	78	+31	7	Semifinals
2	(Argentina) River Plate	4	3	0	1	118	89	+29	6	Semifinals
3	(Uruguay) BBC Layva	4	2	1	1	101	94	+7	5	5–8th place semifinals
4	(Argentina) CID Moreno	4	1	0	3	97	104	−7	2	5–8th place semifinals
5	(Chile) Club Italiano BM	4	0	0	4	69	129	−60	0	Ninth place game

Source: HSCA

30 May; 16:30	CID Moreno (Argentina)	23–27	(Brazil) Clube Português	Ballester, Buenos Aires; Attendance: 400; Referees: Araújo, Perdomo (URU)
30 May; 16:30	Mena & Cabañas each 6	(13–15)	Brasil 7	Ballester, Buenos Aires; Attendance: 400; Referees: Araújo, Perdomo (URU)
30 May; 16:30	1× (yellow card) 2× (suspension)	Report	1× (yellow card) 3× (suspension) 1× (red card)	Ballester, Buenos Aires; Attendance: 400; Referees: Araújo, Perdomo (URU)

30 May; 20:30	BBC Layva (Uruguay)	19–34	(Argentina) River Plate	Ballester, Buenos Aires; Attendance: 400; Referees: Garcia, Paolantoni (ARG)
30 May; 20:30	Bianco 5	(7–16)	Pedernera 6	Ballester, Buenos Aires; Attendance: 400; Referees: Garcia, Paolantoni (ARG)
30 May; 20:30	1× (yellow card) 4× (suspension)	Report	3× (suspension)	Ballester, Buenos Aires; Attendance: 400; Referees: Garcia, Paolantoni (ARG)

31 May; 18:30	Club Italiano BM (Chile)	13–34	(Brazil) Clube Português	Ballester, Buenos Aires; Attendance: 400; Referees: Godoay, Magalhães (BRA)
31 May; 18:30	3 players 3	(8–16)	Lima 7	Ballester, Buenos Aires; Attendance: 400; Referees: Godoay, Magalhães (BRA)
31 May; 18:30	1× (suspension) 1× (red card)	Report	1× (yellow card) 4× (suspension) 1× (red card)	Ballester, Buenos Aires; Attendance: 400; Referees: Godoay, Magalhães (BRA)

31 May; 20:30	River Plate (Argentina)	32–26	(Argentina) CID Moreno	Ballester, Buenos Aires; Attendance: 1050; Referees: Lemes, Sosa (URU)
31 May; 20:30	Garcia 7	(17–14)	Romero 7	Ballester, Buenos Aires; Attendance: 1050; Referees: Lemes, Sosa (URU)
31 May; 20:30	1× (yellow card) 4× (suspension)	Report	1× (yellow card) 3× (suspension) 1× (red card)	Ballester, Buenos Aires; Attendance: 1050; Referees: Lemes, Sosa (URU)

1 June; 14:30	Clube Português (Brazil)	22–22	(Uruguay) BBC Layva	Ballester, Buenos Aires; Attendance: 100; Referees: Conberse, Correa (ARG)
1 June; 14:30	Brasil 6	(13–10)	Barreiro 8	Ballester, Buenos Aires; Attendance: 100; Referees: Conberse, Correa (ARG)
1 June; 14:30	1× (yellow card) 4× (suspension)	Report	1× (yellow card) 1× (suspension)	Ballester, Buenos Aires; Attendance: 100; Referees: Conberse, Correa (ARG)

1 June; 16:30	CID Moreno (Argentina)	30–18	(Chile) Club Italiano BM	Ballester, Buenos Aires; Attendance: 300; Referees: B. Borrea, R. Correa (BRA)
1 June; 16:30	Gonzalez 5	(11–7)	Carrasco & San Martin 5	Ballester, Buenos Aires; Attendance: 300; Referees: B. Borrea, R. Correa (BRA)
1 June; 16:30	1× (yellow card) 3× (suspension)	Report	2× (suspension)	Ballester, Buenos Aires; Attendance: 300; Referees: B. Borrea, R. Correa (BRA)

2 June; 14:30	CID Moreno (Argentina)	18–27	(Uruguay) BBC Layva	Ballester, Buenos Aires; Attendance: 150; Referees: Gody, Magalhães (BRA)
2 June; 14:30	Cabañas & Mena 4	(9–16)	Bianco 8	Ballester, Buenos Aires; Attendance: 150; Referees: Gody, Magalhães (BRA)
2 June; 14:30	3× (suspension)	Report	1× (yellow card) 6× (suspension)	Ballester, Buenos Aires; Attendance: 150; Referees: Gody, Magalhães (BRA)

2 June; 20:30	River Plate (Argentina)	32–18	(Chile) Club Italiano BM	Ballester, Buenos Aires; Attendance: 500; Referees: Araújo, Perdomo (URU)
2 June; 20:30	Carletti 8	(16–7)	Carrasco 8	Ballester, Buenos Aires; Attendance: 500; Referees: Araújo, Perdomo (URU)
2 June; 20:30	1× (yellow card) 3× (suspension)	Report	1× (yellow card) 4× (suspension) 1× (red card)	Ballester, Buenos Aires; Attendance: 500; Referees: Araújo, Perdomo (URU)

3 June; 16:30	Club Italiano BM (Chile)	20–33	(Uruguay) BBC Layva	Ballester, Buenos Aires; Attendance: 300; Referees: B. Correa, R. Correa (BRA)
3 June; 16:30	Canessa 9	(13–15)	Barreiro 7	Ballester, Buenos Aires; Attendance: 300; Referees: B. Correa, R. Correa (BRA)
3 June; 16:30	3× (suspension) 1× (red card)	Report	1× (yellow card) 3× (suspension)	Ballester, Buenos Aires; Attendance: 300; Referees: B. Correa, R. Correa (BRA)

3 June; 18:30	Clube Português (Brazil)	26–20	(Argentina) River Plate	Ballester, Buenos Aires; Attendance: 400; Referees: Lemes, Sosa (URU)
3 June; 18:30	Alexandrino 5	(16–8)	Carletti 5	Ballester, Buenos Aires; Attendance: 400; Referees: Lemes, Sosa (URU)
3 June; 18:30	1× (yellow card) 1× (suspension)	Report	1× (suspension)	Ballester, Buenos Aires; Attendance: 400; Referees: Lemes, Sosa (URU)

=== Group B ===
Pos	Team	Pld	W	D	L	GF	GA	GD	Pts	Qualification
1	(Brazil) EC Pinheiros	4	4	0	0	109	76	+33	8	Semifinals
2	(Argentina) Ferro Carril Oeste	4	2	0	2	96	101	−5	4 (Note: Ferro 30–28 Cerro Porteño)	Semifinals
3	(Paraguay) Cerro Porteño	4	2	0	2	121	116	+5	4	5–8th place semifinals
4	(Chile) Ovalle Balonmano	4	1	0	3	94	117	−23	2 (Note: Ovalle 27–26 Scuola Italiana)	5–8th place semifinals
5	(Uruguay) Scuola Italiana di Montevideo	4	1	0	3	92	102	−10	2	Ninth place game

Source: HSCA
Rules for classification: Tiebreakers
Notes:

30 May; 14:30	Ovalle Balonmano (Chile)	18–27	(Brazil) EC Pinheiros	Ballester, Buenos Aires; Attendance: 100; Referees: Godoy, Magalhães (BRA)
30 May; 14:30	Muller 5	(9–14)	Bolzan 6	Ballester, Buenos Aires; Attendance: 100; Referees: Godoy, Magalhães (BRA)
30 May; 14:30	3× (suspension)	Report	1× (yellow card) 3× (suspension)	Ballester, Buenos Aires; Attendance: 100; Referees: Godoy, Magalhães (BRA)

30 May; 18:30	Ferro Carril Oeste (Argentina)	30–28	(Paraguay) Cerro Porteño	Ballester, Buenos Aires; Attendance: 250; Referees: Lemes, Sosa (URU)
30 May; 18:30	Bartolomeo 9	(19–18)	Insfrán 9	Ballester, Buenos Aires; Attendance: 250; Referees: Lemes, Sosa (URU)
30 May; 18:30	1× (yellow card) 4× (suspension)	Report	1× (yellow card) 1× (suspension)	Ballester, Buenos Aires; Attendance: 250; Referees: Lemes, Sosa (URU)

31 May; 14:30	EC Pinheiros (Brazil)	29–26	(Paraguay) Cerro Porteño	Ballester, Buenos Aires; Attendance: 100; Referees: Conberse, Correa (ARG)
31 May; 14:30	Bolzan 9	(16–11)	Villalba 5	Ballester, Buenos Aires; Attendance: 100; Referees: Conberse, Correa (ARG)
31 May; 14:30	1× (yellow card) 4× (suspension)	Report	4× (suspension)	Ballester, Buenos Aires; Attendance: 100; Referees: Conberse, Correa (ARG)

31 May; 16:30	Scuola Italiana di Montevideo (Uruguay)	23–22	(Argentina) Ferro Carril Oeste	Ballester, Buenos Aires; Attendance: 150; Referees: B. Correa, R. Correa (BRA)
31 May; 16:30	Cherone 7	(10–11)	Salvadó 6	Ballester, Buenos Aires; Attendance: 150; Referees: B. Correa, R. Correa (BRA)
31 May; 16:30	4× (suspension)	Report	1× (yellow card) 1× (suspension)	Ballester, Buenos Aires; Attendance: 150; Referees: B. Correa, R. Correa (BRA)

1 June; 18:30	Cerro Porteño (Paraguay)	30–28	(Uruguay) Scuola Italiana di Montevideo	Ballester, Buenos Aires; Attendance: 200; Referees: Garcia, Paolantoni (ARG)
1 June; 18:30	Villalba 7	(11–16)	Gomez 6	Ballester, Buenos Aires; Attendance: 200; Referees: Garcia, Paolantoni (ARG)
1 June; 18:30	2× (yellow card) 1× (suspension) 1× (red card)	Report	5× (suspension)	Ballester, Buenos Aires; Attendance: 200; Referees: Garcia, Paolantoni (ARG)

1 June; 20:30	Ferro Carril Oeste (Argentina)	27–20	(Chile) Ovalle Balonmano	Ballester, Buenos Aires; Attendance: 150; Referees: Araújo, Perdomo (URU)
1 June; 20:30	Salvadó 9	(10–10)	Lizana 10	Ballester, Buenos Aires; Attendance: 150; Referees: Araújo, Perdomo (URU)
1 June; 20:30	1× (yellow card) 4× (suspension)	Report	4× (suspension)	Ballester, Buenos Aires; Attendance: 150; Referees: Araújo, Perdomo (URU)

2 June; 16:30	Cerro Porteño (Paraguay)	37–29	(Chile) Ovalle Balonmano	Ballester, Buenos Aires; Attendance: 150; Referees: B. Correa, R. Correa (BRA)
2 June; 16:30	Insfrán 7	(18–11)	Muller & Lizana 7	Ballester, Buenos Aires; Attendance: 150; Referees: B. Correa, R. Correa (BRA)
2 June; 16:30	3× (suspension)	Report	2× (yellow card) 2× (suspension)	Ballester, Buenos Aires; Attendance: 150; Referees: B. Correa, R. Correa (BRA)

2 June; 18:30	EC Pinheiros (Brazil)	23–15	(Uruguay) Scuola Italiana di Montevideo	Ballester, Buenos Aires; Attendance: 200; Referees: Conberse, Correa (ARG)
2 June; 18:30	Luz 7	(7–12)	Cherone 5	Ballester, Buenos Aires; Attendance: 200; Referees: Conberse, Correa (ARG)
2 June; 18:30	1× (yellow card) 3× (suspension)	Report	5× (suspension)	Ballester, Buenos Aires; Attendance: 200; Referees: Conberse, Correa (ARG)

3 June; 14:30	Scuola Italiana di Montevideo (Uruguay)	26–27	(Chile) Ovalle Balonmano	Ballester, Buenos Aires; Attendance: 50; Referees: Conberse, Correa (ARG)
3 June; 14:30	Cherone 9	(15–13)	Muller 10	Ballester, Buenos Aires; Attendance: 50; Referees: Conberse, Correa (ARG)
3 June; 14:30	2× (yellow card) 5× (suspension)	Report	2× (yellow card) 4× (suspension)	Ballester, Buenos Aires; Attendance: 50; Referees: Conberse, Correa (ARG)

3 June; 20:30	Ferro Carril Oeste (Argentina)	17–30	(Brazil) EC Pinheiros	Ballester, Buenos Aires; Attendance: 500; Referees: Garcia, Paolantoni (ARG)
3 June; 20:30	Salvadó 5	(9–13)	Bolzan 5	Ballester, Buenos Aires; Attendance: 500; Referees: Garcia, Paolantoni (ARG)
3 June; 20:30	3× (suspension)	Report	3× (yellow card) 3× (suspension)	Ballester, Buenos Aires; Attendance: 500; Referees: Garcia, Paolantoni (ARG)

== Knockout stage ==
=== Bracket ===
Semifinals
B1	(Brazil) EC Pinheiros	30
A2	(Argentina) River Plate	19
A1	(Brazil) Clube Português	32
B2	(Argentina) Ferro Carril Oeste	14

Finals
B1	(Brazil) EC Pinheiros	19
A1	(Brazil) Clube Português	17
Third place
A2	(Argentina) River Plate	23
B2	(Argentina) Ferro Carril Oeste	18

5–8th place semifinals
B4	(Chile) Ovalle Balonmano	22
A3	(Uruguay) BBC Layva	31
B3	(Paraguay) Cerro Porteño	29
A4	(Argentina) CID Moreno	26

Fifth place
A3	(Uruguay) BBC Layva	23
B3	(Paraguay) Cerro Porteño	25
Seventh place
B4	(Chile) Ovalle Balonmano	26
A4	(Argentina) CID Moreno	42

=== Ninth place game ===
4 June; 12:30	Club Italiano BM (Chile)	23–26	(Uruguay) Scuola Italiana di Montevideo	Ballester, Buenos Aires; Attendance: 100; Referees: Godoy, Magalhães (BRA)
4 June; 12:30	Carrasco 7	(11–15)	Cherone 6	Ballester, Buenos Aires; Attendance: 100; Referees: Godoy, Magalhães (BRA)
4 June; 12:30	1× (yellow card) 3× (suspension)	Report	4× (suspension)	Ballester, Buenos Aires; Attendance: 100; Referees: Godoy, Magalhães (BRA)

=== 5–8th place semifinals ===
4 June; 14:30	Ovalle Balonmano (Chile)	22–31	(Uruguay) BBC Layva	Ballester, Buenos Aires; Attendance: 200; Referees: B. Correa, R. Correa (BRA)
4 June; 14:30	Muller 10	(8–12)	Barreiro 8	Ballester, Buenos Aires; Attendance: 200; Referees: B. Correa, R. Correa (BRA)
4 June; 14:30	1× (yellow card) 2× (suspension)	Report	2× (yellow card) 5× (suspension)	Ballester, Buenos Aires; Attendance: 200; Referees: B. Correa, R. Correa (BRA)

4 June
16:30
Cerro Porteño (Paraguay)
29–26
(Argentina) CID Moreno
Ballester, Buenos Aires
Referees: Araújo, Perdomo (URU)
Insfrán 6
(8–15)
Cabañas 8
1× (yellow card) 6× (suspension)
Report
2× (yellow card) 4× (suspension)

FT: 26-26 Pen: 3-0

=== Semifinals ===
4 June; 18:30	EC Pinheiros (Brazil)	30–19	(Argentina) River Plate	Ballester, Buenos Aires; Attendance: 500; Referees: Conberse, Correa (ARG)
4 June; 18:30	Santos & Ferreira 6	(13–10)	Carletti 10	Ballester, Buenos Aires; Attendance: 500; Referees: Conberse, Correa (ARG)
4 June; 18:30	4× (suspension)	Report		Ballester, Buenos Aires; Attendance: 500; Referees: Conberse, Correa (ARG)

4 June; 20:30	Clube Português (Brazil)	32–24	(Argentina) Ferro Carril Oeste	Ballester, Buenos Aires; Attendance: 950; Referees: Lemes, Sosa (URU)
4 June; 20:30	Brasil 7	(15–14)	Ponce de Leon 6	Ballester, Buenos Aires; Attendance: 950; Referees: Lemes, Sosa (URU)
4 June; 20:30	4× (suspension)	Report	1× (yellow card) 1× (suspension)	Ballester, Buenos Aires; Attendance: 950; Referees: Lemes, Sosa (URU)

=== Seventh place game ===
5 June; 11:30	Ovalle Balonmano (Chile)	26–42	(Argentina) CID Moreno	Ballester, Buenos Aires; Attendance: 200; Referees: Godoy, Magalhães (BRA)
5 June; 11:30	Muller 10	(16–24)	Gonzalez 10	Ballester, Buenos Aires; Attendance: 200; Referees: Godoy, Magalhães (BRA)
5 June; 11:30	1× (yellow card) 1× (suspension)	Report	2× (yellow card) 1× (suspension)	Ballester, Buenos Aires; Attendance: 200; Referees: Godoy, Magalhães (BRA)

=== Fifth place game ===
5 June; 13:30	BBC Layva (Uruguay)	23–25	(Paraguay) Cerro Porteño	Ballester, Buenos Aires; Attendance: 200; Referees: Correa, Conberse (ARG)
5 June; 13:30	Pessina 7	(10–14)	Fernández 8	Ballester, Buenos Aires; Attendance: 200; Referees: Correa, Conberse (ARG)
5 June; 13:30	1× (yellow card) 1× (suspension)	Report	1× (yellow card) 4× (suspension)	Ballester, Buenos Aires; Attendance: 200; Referees: Correa, Conberse (ARG)

=== Third place game ===
5 June; 17:00	River Plate (Argentina)	23–18	(Argentina) Ferro Carril Oeste	Ballester, Buenos Aires; Attendance: 900; Referees: Lemes, Sosa (URU)
5 June; 17:00	Pedernera 6	(11–8)	Crivelli 5	Ballester, Buenos Aires; Attendance: 900; Referees: Lemes, Sosa (URU)
5 June; 17:00	1× (yellow card) 6× (suspension)	Report	2× (yellow card) 3× (suspension) 1× (red card)	Ballester, Buenos Aires; Attendance: 900; Referees: Lemes, Sosa (URU)

=== Final ===
5 June; 19:00	Clube Português (Brazil)	17–19	(Brazil) EC Pinheiros	Ballester, Buenos Aires; Attendance: 500; Referees: Garcia, Paolantoni (ARG)
5 June; 19:00	Brasil 5	(8–8)	Ferreira 7	Ballester, Buenos Aires; Attendance: 500; Referees: Garcia, Paolantoni (ARG)
5 June; 19:00	2× (yellow card) 3× (suspension)	Report	1× (yellow card) 1× (suspension)	Ballester, Buenos Aires; Attendance: 500; Referees: Garcia, Paolantoni (ARG)

== Final standing ==
Rank	Team
Gold medal	(Brazil) EC Pinheiros
Silver medal	(Brazil) Clube Português
Bronze medal	(Argentina) River Plate
4	(Argentina) Ferro Carril Oeste
5	(Paraguay) Cerro Porteño
6	(Uruguay) BBC Layva
7	(Argentina) CID Moreno
8	(Chile) Ovalle Balonmano
9	(Uruguay) Scuola Italiana di Montevideo
10	(Chile) Club Italiano BM

2022 South and Central American Women's Club Champions

EC Pinheiros
First title

Team roster: Mariana Araújo, Eduarda Santos, Gabriella Mendes, Lívia Ventura, Nicole Luz, Geandra Rodrigues, Ana Cláudia Bolzan, Rebeca Araújo, Jéssica Antunes, Luara Bastos, Maryanna Ferreira, Marcela Arounian, Maria Dias, Fernanda Couto, Micaela Rodrigues, Thais Utino.
Head coach: Alex Aprile.

== All-star team ==
Name	Position	Club
Geandra Rodrigues	Goalkeeper	(Brazil) EC Pinheiros
Ana Cláudia Bolzan	Left wing	(Brazil) EC Pinheiros
María Brasil	Left back	(Brazil) Clube Português
María Paula Fernández	Centre back	(Paraguay) Cerro Porteño
Nicole Luz	Right back	(Brazil) EC Pinheiros
Iasmin Albuquerque	Right wing	(Brazil) Clube Português
Antonela Mena	Pivot	(Argentina) CID Moreno
