= 2024 South and Central American Women's Club Handball Championship =

Tournament details
- Host country: Brazil
- Venue(s): 1 (in 1 host city)
- Dates: 21–25 May
- Teams: 9 (from 1 confederation)

Final positions
- Champions: (Brazil) EC Pinheiros (3rd title)
- Runner-up: (Argentina) River Plate
- Third place: (Chile) Ovalle Balonmano
- Fourth place: (Brazil) Nacional Handebol Clube

Tournament statistics
- Matches played: 18
- Goals scored: 859 (47.72 per match)

The 2024 South and Central American Women's Club Handball Championship the 4th edition of this tournament was held in São José, Santa Catarina, Brazil from 21 to 25 May 2024.

== Participating teams ==
| Country | Team | Qualified as | League |
|---|---|---|---|
| Argentina | S.E.D.A.L.O. | Winner | 2023 Argentinian Women's Handball Championship A |
| Argentina | Ferro Carril Oeste | Runner-up | 2023 Argentinian Women's Handball Championship A |
| Argentina | River Plate | Third | 2023 Argentinian Women's Handball Championship A |
| Argentina | Jockey Club Córdoba | Fourth | 2023 Argentinian Women's Handball Championship A |
| Brazil | EC Pinheiros | Winner | 2023 Liga Nacional de Handebol |
| Brazil | Nacional Handebol Clube | Runner-up | 2023 Liga Nacional de Handebol |
| Chile | Ovalle Balonmano | Winner | 2023 Liga nacional de balonmano Chile |
| Uruguay | Scuola Italiana di Montevideo | Winner | 2022 Uruguayan Women's Handball Championship |
| Uruguay | Club Atlético Goes | ? | 2022 Uruguayan Women's Handball Championship |

== Preliminary round ==
All times are local (UTC–3).

=== Group A ===
| Pos | Team | Pld | W | D | L | GF | GA | GD | Pts | Qualification |
|---|---|---|---|---|---|---|---|---|---|---|
| 1 | (Brazil) Nacional Handebol Clube | 2 | 1 | 1 | 0 | 52 | 45 | +7 | 3 | Semifinals |
| 2 | (Chile) Ovalle Balonmano | 2 | 1 | 1 | 0 | 52 | 46 | +6 | 3 | Semifinals |
| 3 | (Uruguay) Scuola Italiana di Montevideo | 2 | 0 | 0 | 2 | 39 | 52 | −13 | 0 | 5–9th place quarterfinal |

Source: Handball SCA

| 21 May 2024; 20:00 | Nacional Handebol Clube (Brazil) | 26–26 | (Chile) Ovalle Balonmano | Centro Arena Multiuso, São José, Santa Catarina; Referees: Ramano & Mazzieri (ARG) |
| 21 May 2024; 20:00 | Rafa & Giulia 6 | (13–11) | Müller Ruiz 13 | Centro Arena Multiuso, São José, Santa Catarina; Referees: Ramano & Mazzieri (ARG) |
| 21 May 2024; 20:00 | 5× (suspension) | Report | 3× (suspension) | Centro Arena Multiuso, São José, Santa Catarina; Referees: Ramano & Mazzieri (ARG) |

| 22 May 2024; 20:00 | Scuola Italiana di Montevideo (Uruguay) | 20–26 | (Chile) Ovalle Balonmano | Centro Arena Multiuso, São José, Santa Catarina; Attendance: 130; Referees: Zuñiga & Reyes (CUB) |
| 22 May 2024; 20:00 | Montaño 6 | (13–17) | Müller Ruiz 8 | Centro Arena Multiuso, São José, Santa Catarina; Attendance: 130; Referees: Zuñiga & Reyes (CUB) |
| 22 May 2024; 20:00 | 1× (yellow card) 4× (suspension) | Report | 1× (yellow card) 3× (suspension) | Centro Arena Multiuso, São José, Santa Catarina; Attendance: 130; Referees: Zuñiga & Reyes (CUB) |

| 23 May 2024; 20:00 | Nacional Handebol Clube (Brazil) | 26–19 | (Uruguay) Scuola Italiana di Montevideo | Centro Arena Multiuso, São José, Santa Catarina; Referees: Leyton & Sepulveda (CHI) |
| 23 May 2024; 20:00 | | (10–9) | | Centro Arena Multiuso, São José, Santa Catarina; Referees: Leyton & Sepulveda (CHI) |
| 23 May 2024; 20:00 | | Report | | Centro Arena Multiuso, São José, Santa Catarina; Referees: Leyton & Sepulveda (CHI) |

=== Group B ===
| Pos | Team | Pld | W | D | L | GF | GA | GD | Pts | Qualification |
|---|---|---|---|---|---|---|---|---|---|---|
| 1 | (Brazil) EC Pinheiros | 2 | 2 | 0 | 0 | 55 | 36 | +19 | 4 | Semifinals |
| 2 | (Argentina) S.E.D.A.L.O. | 2 | 1 | 0 | 1 | 51 | 47 | +4 | 2 | 5–9th place semifinals |
| 3 | (Argentina) Jockey Club Córdoba | 2 | 0 | 0 | 2 | 37 | 60 | −23 | 0 | 5–9th place quarterfinal |

Source: Handball SCA

| 21 May 2024; 16:00 | Jockey Club Córdoba (Argentina) | 18–27 | (Brazil) EC Pinheiros | Centro Arena Multiuso, São José, Santa Catarina; Attendance: 30; Referees: Zuñiga & Reyes (CUB) |
| 21 May 2024; 16:00 | Antonela 8 | (11–12) | Couto 5 | Centro Arena Multiuso, São José, Santa Catarina; Attendance: 30; Referees: Zuñiga & Reyes (CUB) |
| 21 May 2024; 16:00 | | Report | 3× (suspension) | Centro Arena Multiuso, São José, Santa Catarina; Attendance: 30; Referees: Zuñiga & Reyes (CUB) |

| 22 May 2024; 18:00 | S.E.D.A.L.O. (Argentina) | 33–19 | (Argentina) Jockey Club Córdoba | Centro Arena Multiuso, São José, Santa Catarina; Attendance: 120; Referees: Burgos & Lenzue (URU) |
| 22 May 2024; 18:00 | Pizzo 9 | (14–10) | Haro 7 | Centro Arena Multiuso, São José, Santa Catarina; Attendance: 120; Referees: Burgos & Lenzue (URU) |
| 22 May 2024; 18:00 | 1× (yellow card) 3× (suspension) | Report | 3× (suspension) | Centro Arena Multiuso, São José, Santa Catarina; Attendance: 120; Referees: Burgos & Lenzue (URU) |

| 23 May 2024; 18:00 | EC Pinheiros (Brazil) | 28–18 | (Argentina) S.E.D.A.L.O. | Centro Arena Multiuso, São José, Santa Catarina; Attendance: 120; Referees: Burgos & Lenzue (URU) |
| 23 May 2024; 18:00 | 3 players 5 | (16–09) | Luque 5 | Centro Arena Multiuso, São José, Santa Catarina; Attendance: 120; Referees: Burgos & Lenzue (URU) |
| 23 May 2024; 18:00 | 4× (suspension) | Report | 2× (yellow card) 2× (suspension) | Centro Arena Multiuso, São José, Santa Catarina; Attendance: 120; Referees: Burgos & Lenzue (URU) |

=== Group C ===
| Pos | Team | Pld | W | D | L | GF | GA | GD | Pts | Qualification |
|---|---|---|---|---|---|---|---|---|---|---|
| 1 | (Argentina) River Plate | 2 | 1 | 0 | 1 | 50 | 47 | +3 | 2 | Semifinals |
| 2 | (Uruguay) Club Atlético Goes | 2 | 1 | 0 | 1 | 49 | 46 | +3 | 2 | 5–9th place semifinals |
| 3 | (Argentina) Ferro Carril Oeste | 2 | 1 | 0 | 1 | 51 | 57 | −6 | 2 | 5–9th place semifinals |

Source: Handball SCA

| 21 May 2024; 18:00 | Ferro Carril Oeste (Argentina) | 28–27 | (Argentina) River Plate | Centro Arena Multiuso, São José, Santa Catarina; Attendance: 100; Referees: Araujo & Perdomo (URU) |
| 21 May 2024; 18:00 | Ponce de León 9 | (16–11) | Carletti 8 | Centro Arena Multiuso, São José, Santa Catarina; Attendance: 100; Referees: Araujo & Perdomo (URU) |
| 21 May 2024; 18:00 | 2× (suspension) | Report | 1× (suspension) | Centro Arena Multiuso, São José, Santa Catarina; Attendance: 100; Referees: Araujo & Perdomo (URU) |

| 22 May 2024; 16:00 | Club Atlético Goes (Uruguay) | 30–23 | (Argentina) Ferro Carril Oeste | Centro Arena Multiuso, São José, Santa Catarina; Attendance: 80; Referees: Concalvez & Dezembro (BRA) |
| 22 May 2024; 16:00 | Vigna 7 | (15–13) | Demarco 5 | Centro Arena Multiuso, São José, Santa Catarina; Attendance: 80; Referees: Concalvez & Dezembro (BRA) |
| 22 May 2024; 16:00 | 1× (yellow card) 2× (suspension) | Report | 2× (yellow card) 4× (suspension) | Centro Arena Multiuso, São José, Santa Catarina; Attendance: 80; Referees: Concalvez & Dezembro (BRA) |

| 23 May 2024; 16:00 | River Plate (Argentina) | 23–19 | (Uruguay) Club Atlético Goes | Centro Arena Multiuso, São José, Santa Catarina; Attendance: 130; Referees: Araujo & Perdomo (URU) |
| 23 May 2024; 16:00 | Carletti 7 | (12–10) | Vigna 6 | Centro Arena Multiuso, São José, Santa Catarina; Attendance: 130; Referees: Araujo & Perdomo (URU) |
| 23 May 2024; 16:00 | 1× (yellow card) 4× (suspension) | Report | 1× (yellow card) 3× (suspension) 1× (red card) | Centro Arena Multiuso, São José, Santa Catarina; Attendance: 130; Referees: Araujo & Perdomo (URU) |

== Knockout stage ==
=== Bracket ===
5–9th place quarterfinal
A3 | (Uruguay) Scuola Italiana di Montevideo | 16
B3 | (Argentina) Jockey Club Córdoba | 18

5–9th place semifinals
B2 | (Argentina) S.E.D.A.L.O. | 26
B3 | (Argentina) Jockey Club Córdoba | 18
C2 | (Uruguay) Club Atlético Goes | 27
C3 | (Argentina) Ferro Carril Oeste | 28

Fifth place
B2 | (Argentina) S.E.D.A.L.O. | 26
C3 | (Argentina) Ferro Carril Oeste | 20
Seventh place
B3 | (Argentina) Jockey Club Córdoba | 14
C2 | (Uruguay) Club Atlético Goes | 25

Semifinals
A1 | (Brazil) Nacional Handebol Clube | 18
C1 | (Argentina) River Plate | 24
B1 | (Brazil) EC Pinheiros | 41
A2 | (Chile) Ovalle Balonmano | 18

Finals
B1 | (Brazil) EC Pinheiros | 25
C1 | (Argentina) River Plate | 16
Third place
A1 | (Brazil) Nacional Handebol Clube | 24
A2 | (Chile) Ovalle Balonmano | 39

=== 5–9th place quarterfinal ===
| 24 May 2024; 11:30 | Scuola Italiana di Montevideo (Uruguay) | 16–18 | (Argentina) Jockey Club Córdoba | Poliesportivo Raphael, São José, Santa Catarina; Attendance: 130; Referees: Concalvez & Dezembro (BRA) |
| 24 May 2024; 11:30 | Tejeira 6 | (7–9) | Haro 5 | Poliesportivo Raphael, São José, Santa Catarina; Attendance: 130; Referees: Concalvez & Dezembro (BRA) |
| 24 May 2024; 11:30 | 2× (yellow card) 6× (suspension) | Report | 1× (yellow card) 4× (suspension) | Poliesportivo Raphael, São José, Santa Catarina; Attendance: 130; Referees: Concalvez & Dezembro (BRA) |

=== 5–9th place semifinals ===
| 24 May 2024; 14:15 | Club Atlético Goes (Uruguay) | 27–28 | (Argentina) Ferro Carril Oeste | Poliesportivo Raphael, São José, Santa Catarina; Attendance: 170; Referees: Zuñiga & Reyes (CUB) |
| 24 May 2024; 14:15 | Vigna 8 | (16–13) | Recalde 6 | Poliesportivo Raphael, São José, Santa Catarina; Attendance: 170; Referees: Zuñiga & Reyes (CUB) |
| 24 May 2024; 14:15 | 2× (yellow card) 4× (suspension) | Report | 2× (yellow card) 2× (suspension) | Poliesportivo Raphael, São José, Santa Catarina; Attendance: 170; Referees: Zuñiga & Reyes (CUB) |

| 24 May 2024; 18:15 | S.E.D.A.L.O. (Argentina) | 26–18 | (Argentina) Jockey Club Córdoba | Poliesportivo Raphael, São José, Santa Catarina; Attendance: 60; Referees: Araujo & Perdomo (URU) |
| 24 May 2024; 18:15 | Pizzo & Garcia 5 | (12–6) | Antonela 7 | Poliesportivo Raphael, São José, Santa Catarina; Attendance: 60; Referees: Araujo & Perdomo (URU) |
| 24 May 2024; 18:15 | 4× (suspension) | Report | 1× (suspension) | Poliesportivo Raphael, São José, Santa Catarina; Attendance: 60; Referees: Araujo & Perdomo (URU) |

=== Semifinals ===
| 24 May 2024; 16:15 | Nacional Handebol Clube (Brazil) | 18–24 | (Argentina) River Plate | Poliesportivo Raphael, São José, Santa Catarina; Attendance: 200; Referees: Leyton & Spulveda (CHI) |
| 24 May 2024; 16:15 | Rafa 4 | (9–14) | Caceres 5 | Poliesportivo Raphael, São José, Santa Catarina; Attendance: 200; Referees: Leyton & Spulveda (CHI) |
| 24 May 2024; 16:15 | 2× (suspension) | Report | 1× (yellow card) 2× (suspension) | Poliesportivo Raphael, São José, Santa Catarina; Attendance: 200; Referees: Leyton & Spulveda (CHI) |

| 24 May 2024; 20:15 | EC Pinheiros (Brazil) | 41–18 | (Chile) Ovalle Balonmano | Poliesportivo Raphael, São José, Santa Catarina; Referees: Ramano & Mazzieri (ARG) |
| 24 May 2024; 20:15 | | (19–10) | | Poliesportivo Raphael, São José, Santa Catarina; Referees: Ramano & Mazzieri (ARG) |
| 24 May 2024; 20:15 | | Report | | Poliesportivo Raphael, São José, Santa Catarina; Referees: Ramano & Mazzieri (ARG) |

=== Seventh place game ===
| 25 May 2024; 13:30 | Jockey Club Córdoba (Argentina) | 14–25 | (Uruguay) Club Atlético Goes | Poliesportivo Raphael, São José, Santa Catarina; Attendance: 91; Referees: Concalvez & Dezembro (BRA) |
| 25 May 2024; 13:30 | Antonela 5 | (6–11) | Ferrari Lorenca 7 | Poliesportivo Raphael, São José, Santa Catarina; Attendance: 91; Referees: Concalvez & Dezembro (BRA) |
| 25 May 2024; 13:30 | 3× (suspension) | Report | 1× (yellow card) 4× (suspension) | Poliesportivo Raphael, São José, Santa Catarina; Attendance: 91; Referees: Concalvez & Dezembro (BRA) |

=== Fifth place game ===
| 25 May 2024; 15:30 | S.E.D.A.L.O. (Argentina) | 26–20 | (Argentina) Ferro Carril Oeste | Poliesportivo Raphael, São José, Santa Catarina; Attendance: 140; Referees: Leyton & Spulveda (CHI) |
| 25 May 2024; 15:30 | Garcia 7 | (11–8) | Ponce de León 6 | Poliesportivo Raphael, São José, Santa Catarina; Attendance: 140; Referees: Leyton & Spulveda (CHI) |
| 25 May 2024; 15:30 | 1× (suspension) | Report | 1× (suspension) | Poliesportivo Raphael, São José, Santa Catarina; Attendance: 140; Referees: Leyton & Spulveda (CHI) |

=== Third place game ===
| 25 May 2024; 17:30 | Nacional Handebol Clube (Brazil) | 24–39 | (Chile) Ovalle Balonmano | Poliesportivo Raphael, São José, Santa Catarina; Attendance: 150; Referees: Ramano & Mazzieri (ARG) |
| 25 May 2024; 17:30 | Klau 7 | (9–18) | Müller Ruiz 14 | Poliesportivo Raphael, São José, Santa Catarina; Attendance: 150; Referees: Ramano & Mazzieri (ARG) |
| 25 May 2024; 17:30 | 2× (yellow card) 5× (suspension) | Report | 1× (yellow card) 3× (suspension) | Poliesportivo Raphael, São José, Santa Catarina; Attendance: 150; Referees: Ramano & Mazzieri (ARG) |

=== Final ===
| 25 May 2024; 20:00 | EC Pinheiros (Brazil) | 25–16 | (Argentina) River Plate | Poliesportivo Raphael, São José, Santa Catarina; Attendance: 200; Referees: Burgos & Lenzue (URU) |
| 25 May 2024; 20:00 | Couto 5 | (10–6) | Nobile 4 | Poliesportivo Raphael, São José, Santa Catarina; Attendance: 200; Referees: Burgos & Lenzue (URU) |
| 25 May 2024; 20:00 | 3× (suspension) | Report | 1× (yellow card) 1× (suspension) | Poliesportivo Raphael, São José, Santa Catarina; Attendance: 200; Referees: Burgos & Lenzue (URU) |

== Final standing ==
| Rank | Team |
|---|---|
| Gold medal | (Brazil) EC Pinheiros |
| Silver medal | (Argentina) River Plate |
| Bronze medal | (Chile) Ovalle Balonmano |
| 4 | (Brazil) Nacional Handebol Clube |
| 5 | (Argentina) S.E.D.A.L.O. |
| 6 | (Argentina) Ferro Carril Oeste |
| 7 | (Uruguay) Club Atlético Goes |
| 8 | (Argentina) Jockey Club Córdoba |
| 9 | (Uruguay) Scuola Italiana di Montevideo |

2024 South and Central American Women's Club Champions

EC Pinheiros
Thirth title

Team roster: Rocio Martinelli, Gabriella Mendes, Lorenna Loyane Souza, Barbarah Monteiro, Fernanda Couto, Rebeca Cristini Gregorio, Rayane Emily Santos, Mayara Moura, Rafaela Izzo, Jessica de Oliveira, Micaela da Silva, Thais Utino, Livia Freitas, Tayna Krause, Carmen Delphino, Lívia Ventura
Staff: Mauricio Antonucci, Carla Vanessa Rodrigues Antonucci, Ronaldo Bueno Pinto, Ana Clara Bezerra Romancini.
