= Mayara Moura =

Brazilian handball player (born 1986)

Personal information
- Full name: Mayara Fier de Moura
- Born: 5 December 1986 (age 39) Arapongas, Brazil
- Height: 1.68 m (5 ft 6 in)

Sport
- Sport: Handball
- Position: Right back
- Number: 22

Senior clubs
- Years: Team
- –: AD Blumenau
- 2007–2010: Club León Balonmano
- 2010–2012: Mios Biganos Handball
- 2012–2013: Hypo Niederösterreich
- 2013–2014: AD Blumenau
- 2014–2015: Nykøbing Falster
- 2016–: EC Pinheiros
National team
Years	Team	Apps	(Gls)
2007-2017	Brazil	108	(158)
Medal record
World Championship
Gold medal – first place	2013 Serbia
Pan American Games
Gold medal – first place	2011 Guadalajara	Team
Pan American Championship
Gold medal – first place	2011 Brazil
Gold medal – first place	2017 Argentina

Mayara Fier de Moura (born 5 December 1986) is a Brazilian handballer. She is a member of the Brazilian national team and participated at the 2011 World Women's Handball Championship in Brazil and the 2012 Summer Olympics. In 2013 she won the World Championship; the first time ever for Brazil and South America.

== Career ==
Mayara Moura started playing handball at the age of 9 with her father as the coach. Later she was contracted by the Brazilian top club AD Blumenau, where she played from 2006 to 2007.

She then joined Spanish side Club León Balonmano from 2007 to 2010. She then joined French Mios Biganos Handball. Here she won the Challenge cup in 2011.

In the 2012–13 season she played for Austrian Hypo Niederösterreich. Here she won the national league and cup, as well as the EHF Cup Winners' Cup. She then returned to Brazil and AD Blumenau.

After the World cup triumph she joined Danish side Nykøbing Falster HK. In December 2014 she had a cruciate ligament injury.

From 2016 she played for Brazilian EC Pinheiros.

== Club Titles ==
- Pan American Women's Club Handball Championship:
  - 2017
- South and Central American Women's Club Handball Championship:
  - 2023, 2024
- EHF Cup Winners' Cup
  - Winner: 2013
- Austrian League:
  - Winner: 2013
- Austrian Cup:
  - Winner: 2013
