= Lívia Ventura =

Brazilian handball player (born 1987)

Personal information
- Full name: Lívia Martins Horacio Ventura
- Born: 18 January 1987 (age 39) São Paulo, Brazil
- Height: 1.70 m (5 ft 7 in)

Sport
- Sport: Handball
- Position: Pivot
- Current club: Pinheiros
- Number: 91

Senior clubs
- Years: Team
- –: Pinheiros
National team
- Years: Team
- –: Brazil
Medal record
South and Central American Championship
Gold medal – first place	2021 Paraguay	Team
Gold medal – first place	2022 Argentina	Team
South American Games
Gold medal – first place	2022 Asunción	Team

Lívia Martins Horacio Ventura (born 18 January 1987) is a Brazilian handball player who plays as a pivot for Pinheiros and for Brazil internationally. She made her Olympic debut representing Brazil at the 2020 Summer Olympics.

She was included in the Brazilian squad in the women's handball competition for the 2020 Summer Olympics.

== Titles ==
- South and Central American Women's Club Handball Championship: 2022, 2023, 2024
