= Ana Cláudia Bolzan =

Brazilian handball player (born 1996)

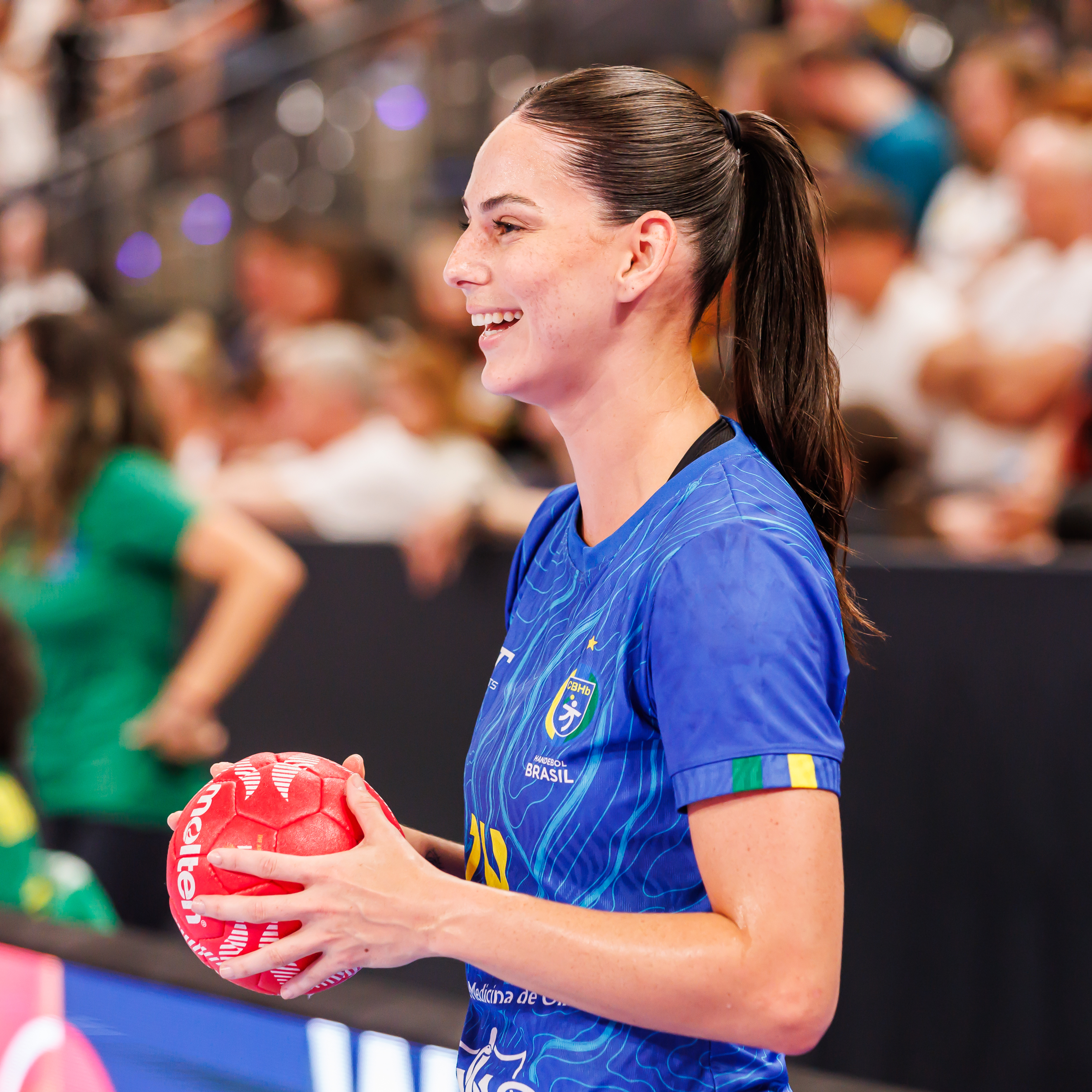
- Bolzan in 2024

Personal information
- Full name: Ana Cláudia Bolzan e Silva
- Born: 15 July 1996 (age 30) Mantenópolis, Brazil
- Height: 1.78 m (5 ft 10 in)

Sport
- Sport: Handball
- Position: Left wing
- Current club: HC DAC Dunajska Streda
- Number: 14

Senior clubs
- Years: Team
- –2022: EC Pinheiros
- 2023–2025: Benfica
- 2025–: HC DAC Dunajska Streda
National team
Years	Team	Apps	(Gls)
–	Brazil	45	(82)
Medal record
South and Central American Championship
Gold medal – first place	2024 Brazil
South American Games
Gold medal – first place	2018 Cochabamba	Team
Gold medal – first place	2022 Asunción	Team
- Updated on 1 August 2025

Ana Cláudia Bolzan e Silva (born 15 July 1996) is a Brazilian handballer for HC DAC Dunajska Streda (handball) and the Brazilian national team.

== Titles ==
- Pan American Women's Club Handball Championship: 2017
- South and Central American Women's Club Handball Championship: 2022

== Individual awards ==
- 2022 South and Central American Women's Club Handball Championship: All star team left wing
