= Marcela Arounian =

Brazilian handball player

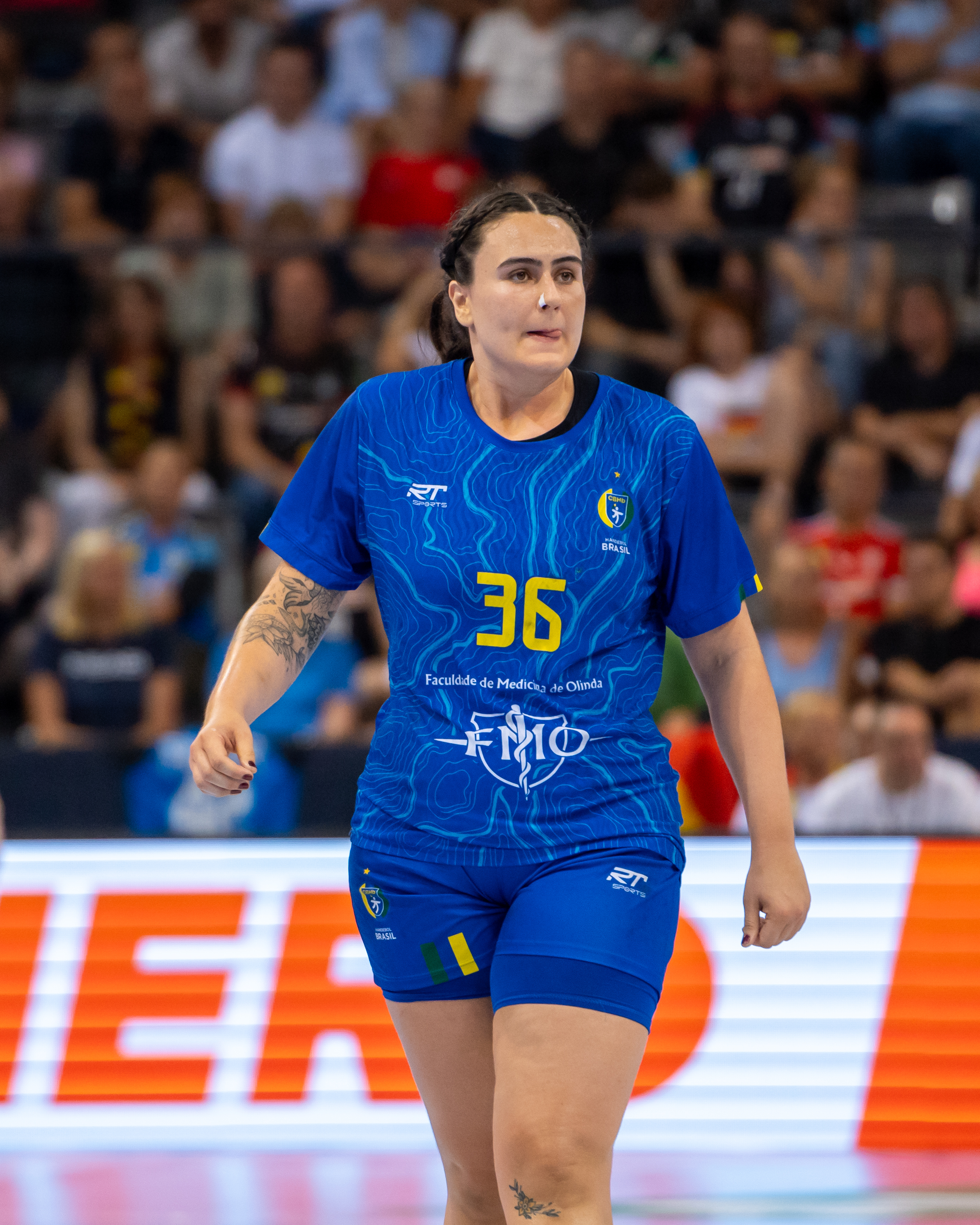
- Arounian in 2024

Personal information
- Full name: Marcela Santos Arounian
- Nationality: Brazilian
- Born: 7 January 2000 (age 26) São Paulo, Brazil
- Height: 184 cm (72 in)

Sport
- Sport: Handball
- Position: Pivot
- Current club: Thüringer HC
- Number: 36

Senior clubs
- Years: Team
- -2022: EC Pinheiros
- 2023-2025: Club Deportivo Balonmano Aula
- 2025-2026: Saint-Amand Handball
- 2026-: Thüringer HC
National team
Years	Team	Apps	(Gls)
–	Brazil	54	(86)
Medal record
Pan American Games
Gold medal – first place	2023 Santiago	Team
South and Central American Championship
Gold medal – first place	2022 Argentina
Gold medal – first place	2024 Brazil
South American Games
Gold medal – first place	2022 Asunción	Team
Junior Pan American Games
Bronze medal – third place	2021 Cali	Team
- Updated on 26 October 2025

Marcela Santos Arounian (Note: This name uses Portuguese naming customs: the first or maternal family name is Santos and the second or paternal family name is Arounian.) (born 7 January 2000) is a Brazilian handballer. She represented Brazil at the 2024 Summer Olympics.

== Club titles ==
- South and Central American Women's Club Handball Championship: 2022
