= 2021 IHF Men's Super Globe =

International Handball Competition

Tournament details
- Host country: Saudi Arabia
- Venue(s): 1 (in 1 host city)
- Dates: 5–9 October
- Teams: 10 (from 6 confederations)

Final positions
- Champions: (Germany) SC Magdeburg (1st title)
- Runner-up: (Spain) FC Barcelona
- Third place: (Denmark) Aalborg Håndbold
- Fourth place: (Brazil) EC Pinheiros

Tournament statistics
- Matches played: 16
- Goals scored: 948 (59.25 per match)
- Top scorer(s): (Egypt) Akram Youssry (23 goals)

‌The 2021 IHF Men's Super Globe was the 14th edition of the yearly club world championship and held from 5 to 9 October 2021 at Jeddah, Saudi Arabia under the aegis of International Handball Federation (IHF). It was the second time in history that the event was organised by the Saudi Arabian Handball Federation.

SC Magdeburg won their first title by defeating FC Barcelona in the final.

== Venue ==
The championship will be played in Jeddah, at the King Abdullah Sports City.

Jeddah	2021 IHF Men's Super Globe is located in Saudi Arabia
King Abdullah Sports City; Capacity: unknown	2021 IHF Men's Super Globe is located in Saudi Arabia

== Teams ==
Ten teams competed in the tournament. The winners of the continental tournaments, the defending champion, a host team and a wild card team.

Team	Qualified as
(Spain) FC Barcelona	Defending champion
(Egypt) Zamalek SC	Winner of Africa Men's Handball Super Cup
(Qatar) Al Duhail SC	Winner of Asian Club League Championship
(Australia) Sydney University	Representative of Oceania
(United States) San Francisco CalHeat	Winner of North American and Caribbean Senior Club Championship
(Brazil) EC Pinheiros	Winner of South and Central American Men's Club Handball Championship
(Denmark) Aalborg Håndbold	Runner-up of EHF Champions League (Note: FC Barcelona was the winner of the EHF Champions League but they are already qualified as Defending champion)
(Saudi Arabia) Al Wehda	Wildcard
(Saudi Arabia) Al-Noor	Host for winning the domestic league
(Germany) SC Magdeburg	Wildcard for winning the EHF European League

== Referees ==
The referee pairs were announced on 31 August 2021.

Referees
Argentina	Julian Grillo; Sebastián Lenci
Croatia	Matija Gubica; Boris Milošević
Egypt	Alaa Emam; Hossam Hedaia
Lithuania	Mindaugas Gatelis; Vaidas Mažeika
North Macedonia	Gjorgji Nachevski; Slave Nikolov
Norway	Håvard Kleven; Lars Jørum

== Results ==
All times are local (UTC+3).

=== Bracket ===
Quarterfinals qualification
5 October
(Australia) Sydney University	20
(Germany) SC Magdeburg	32
5 October
(Saudi Arabia) Al Wehda	29
(United States) San Francisco CalHeat	20

Quarter-finals
6 October
(Qatar) Al Duhail SC	23
(Germany) SC Magdeburg	35
6 October
(Denmark) Aalborg Håndbold	38
(Saudi Arabia) Al Wehda	27
6 October
(Saudi Arabia) Al-Noor	33
(Brazil) EC Pinheiros	34
6 October
(Spain) FC Barcelona	36
(Egypt) Zamalek SC	32

Semi-finals
7 October
(Germany) SC Magdeburg	32
(Denmark) Aalborg Håndbold	30
7 October
(Brazil) EC Pinheiros	24
(Spain) FC Barcelona	39

Final
9 October
(Germany) SC Magdeburg	33
(Spain) FC Barcelona	28
Third place
9 October
(Denmark) Aalborg Håndbold	34
(Brazil) EC Pinheiros	29

=== Quarterfinals qualification ===
5 October 2021; 16:30	Sydney University (Australia)	20–32	(Germany) SC Magdeburg	King Abdullah Sport City Hall, Jeddah; Attendance: 950; Referees: Emam, Hedaia (EGY)
5 October 2021; 16:30	Calvert 9	(12–17)	Smits 8	King Abdullah Sport City Hall, Jeddah; Attendance: 950; Referees: Emam, Hedaia (EGY)
5 October 2021; 16:30	5× (suspension)	Report	2× (suspension)	King Abdullah Sport City Hall, Jeddah; Attendance: 950; Referees: Emam, Hedaia (EGY)

5 October 2021; 20:30	Al Wehda (Saudi Arabia)	29–20	(United States) San Francisco CalHeat	King Abdullah Sport City Hall, Jeddah; Attendance: 2,680; Referees: Gatelis, Mažeika (LTU)
5 October 2021; 20:30	Hernández 6	(13–6)	Rubio 5	King Abdullah Sport City Hall, Jeddah; Attendance: 2,680; Referees: Gatelis, Mažeika (LTU)
5 October 2021; 20:30	5× (suspension)	Report	2× (yellow card) 7× (suspension) 1× (red card)	King Abdullah Sport City Hall, Jeddah; Attendance: 2,680; Referees: Gatelis, Mažeika (LTU)

=== Quarterfinals ===
6 October 2021; 13:15	Al Duhail SC (Qatar)	23–35	(Germany) SC Magdeburg	King Abdullah Sport City Hall, Jeddah; Attendance: 425; Referees: Jørum, Kleven (NOR)
6 October 2021; 13:15	Berrached, Capote 4	(9–16)	Damgaard, Hornke 6	King Abdullah Sport City Hall, Jeddah; Attendance: 425; Referees: Jørum, Kleven (NOR)
6 October 2021; 13:15	4× (suspension)	Report	3× (yellow card) 4× (suspension)	King Abdullah Sport City Hall, Jeddah; Attendance: 425; Referees: Jørum, Kleven (NOR)

6 October 2021; 15:30	Al-Noor (Saudi Arabia)	33–34	(Brazil) EC Pinheiros	King Abdullah Sport City Hall, Jeddah; Attendance: 500; Referees: Nachevski, Nikolov (MKD)
6 October 2021; 15:30	Panić 8	(16–19)	Silva dos Reis, Valadão 6	King Abdullah Sport City Hall, Jeddah; Attendance: 500; Referees: Nachevski, Nikolov (MKD)
6 October 2021; 15:30	1× (yellow card) 3× (suspension)	Report	1× (yellow card) 5× (suspension) 1× (red card)	King Abdullah Sport City Hall, Jeddah; Attendance: 500; Referees: Nachevski, Nikolov (MKD)

6 October 2021; 17:45	Aalborg Håndbold (Denmark)	38–27	(Saudi Arabia) Al Wehda	King Abdullah Sport City Hall, Jeddah; Attendance: 1,375; Referees: Grillo, Lenci (ARG)
6 October 2021; 17:45	Barthold 8	(19–10)	Hernández 8	King Abdullah Sport City Hall, Jeddah; Attendance: 1,375; Referees: Grillo, Lenci (ARG)
6 October 2021; 17:45	1× (yellow card) 5× (suspension)	Report	3× (suspension)	King Abdullah Sport City Hall, Jeddah; Attendance: 1,375; Referees: Grillo, Lenci (ARG)

6 October 2021; 20:30	FC Barcelona (Spain)	36–32	(Egypt) Zamalek SC	King Abdullah Sport City Hall, Jeddah; Referees: Gubica, Milošević (CRO)
6 October 2021; 20:30	Frade, Mem 7	(18–17)	Saad 7	King Abdullah Sport City Hall, Jeddah; Referees: Gubica, Milošević (CRO)
6 October 2021; 20:30	4× (suspension)	Report	1× (yellow card) 3× (suspension)	King Abdullah Sport City Hall, Jeddah; Referees: Gubica, Milošević (CRO)

=== Placement round 5–10 ===
==== Group A ====
Pos	Team	Pld	W	D	L	GF	GA	GD	Pts
1	(Qatar) Al Duhail SC	2	2	0	0	68	45	+23	4
2	(Saudi Arabia) Al-Noor	2	1	0	1	52	62	−10	2
3	(United States) San Francisco CalHeat	2	0	0	2	47	60	−13	0

Source: IHF
Rules for classification: 1) points; 2) head-to-head points; 3) head-to-head goal difference; 4) head-to-head number of goals scored; 5) goal difference.

7 October 2021; 13:45	San Francisco CalHeat (United States)	24–30	(Saudi Arabia) Al-Noor	King Abdullah Sport City Hall, Jeddah; Attendance: 250; Referees: Grillo, Lenci (ARG)
7 October 2021; 13:45	Rubio 5	(10–14)	Al-Abbas 9	King Abdullah Sport City Hall, Jeddah; Attendance: 250; Referees: Grillo, Lenci (ARG)
7 October 2021; 13:45	1× (yellow card) 5× (suspension) 1× (red card)	Report	1× (yellow card) 2× (suspension) 1× (red card)	King Abdullah Sport City Hall, Jeddah; Attendance: 250; Referees: Grillo, Lenci (ARG)

8 October 2021; 16:00	Al Duhail SC (Qatar)	30–23	(United States) San Francisco CalHeat	King Abdullah Sport City Hall, Jeddah; Attendance: 300; Referees: Gubica, Milošević (CRO)
8 October 2021; 16:00	Hamdoun 7	(16–14)	Ramseier 6	King Abdullah Sport City Hall, Jeddah; Attendance: 300; Referees: Gubica, Milošević (CRO)
8 October 2021; 16:00	3× (suspension)	Report	7× (suspension)	King Abdullah Sport City Hall, Jeddah; Attendance: 300; Referees: Gubica, Milošević (CRO)

9 October 2021; 13:45	Al-Noor (Saudi Arabia)	22–38	(Qatar) Al Duhail SC	King Abdullah Sport City Hall, Jeddah; Attendance: 900; Referees: Emam, Hedaia (EGY)
9 October 2021; 13:45	Al-Abbas 7	(11–19)	Berrached 10	King Abdullah Sport City Hall, Jeddah; Attendance: 900; Referees: Emam, Hedaia (EGY)
9 October 2021; 13:45	4× (suspension)	Report	1× (yellow card) 5× (suspension)	King Abdullah Sport City Hall, Jeddah; Attendance: 900; Referees: Emam, Hedaia (EGY)

==== Group B ====
Pos	Team	Pld	W	D	L	GF	GA	GD	Pts
1	(Egypt) Zamalek SC	2	2	0	0	80	41	+39	4
2	(Australia) Sydney University	2	0	1	1	45	64	−19	1
3	(Saudi Arabia) Al Wehda	2	0	1	1	48	68	−20	1

Source: IHF
Rules for classification: 1) points; 2) head-to-head points; 3) head-to-head goal difference; 4) head-to-head number of goals scored; 5) goal difference.

7 October 2021; 16:00	Sydney University (Australia)	19–38	(Egypt) Zamalek SC	King Abdullah Sport City Hall, Jeddah; Attendance: 1,350; Referees: Gatelis, Mažeika (LTU)
7 October 2021; 16:00	Dippe 8	(7–18)	Saad 7	King Abdullah Sport City Hall, Jeddah; Attendance: 1,350; Referees: Gatelis, Mažeika (LTU)
7 October 2021; 16:00	2× (yellow card) 6× (suspension)	Report	1× (yellow card) 6× (suspension)	King Abdullah Sport City Hall, Jeddah; Attendance: 1,350; Referees: Gatelis, Mažeika (LTU)

8 October 2021; 18:15	Al Wehda (Saudi Arabia)	26–26	(Australia) Sydney University	King Abdullah Sport City Hall, Jeddah; Attendance: 1,200; Referees: Kleven, Jørum (NOR)
8 October 2021; 18:15	Helali 6	(17–8)	Calvert 10	King Abdullah Sport City Hall, Jeddah; Attendance: 1,200; Referees: Kleven, Jørum (NOR)
8 October 2021; 18:15	2× (yellow card) 5× (suspension)	Report	1× (yellow card) 8× (suspension)	King Abdullah Sport City Hall, Jeddah; Attendance: 1,200; Referees: Kleven, Jørum (NOR)

9 October 2021; 16:00	Zamalek SC (Egypt)	42–22	(Saudi Arabia) Al Wehda	King Abdullah Sport City Hall, Jeddah; Referees: Nachevski, Nikolov (MKD)
9 October 2021; 16:00	Saad 9	(19–10)	Barabash 5	King Abdullah Sport City Hall, Jeddah; Referees: Nachevski, Nikolov (MKD)
9 October 2021; 16:00	3× (suspension)	Report	3× (suspension)	King Abdullah Sport City Hall, Jeddah; Referees: Nachevski, Nikolov (MKD)

=== Semifinals ===
7 October 2021; 18:15	SC Magdeburg (Germany)	32–30	(Denmark) Aalborg Håndbold	King Abdullah Sport City Hall, Jeddah; Attendance: 1,450; Referees: Nachevski, Nikolov (MKD)
7 October 2021; 18:15	Damgaard 11	(18–18)	Bjørnsen, Juul 5	King Abdullah Sport City Hall, Jeddah; Attendance: 1,450; Referees: Nachevski, Nikolov (MKD)
7 October 2021; 18:15	1× (yellow card) 5× (suspension)	Report	2× (yellow card) 5× (suspension)	King Abdullah Sport City Hall, Jeddah; Attendance: 1,450; Referees: Nachevski, Nikolov (MKD)

7 October 2021; 20:30	EC Pinheiros (Brazil)	24–39	(Spain) FC Barcelona	King Abdullah Sport City Hall, Jeddah; Attendance: 900; Referees: Kleven, Jørum (NOR)
7 October 2021; 20:30	Seifert 6	(16–23)	Fabregas 6	King Abdullah Sport City Hall, Jeddah; Attendance: 900; Referees: Kleven, Jørum (NOR)
7 October 2021; 20:30	1× (yellow card) 5× (suspension)	Report	1× (yellow card) 3× (suspension)	King Abdullah Sport City Hall, Jeddah; Attendance: 900; Referees: Kleven, Jørum (NOR)

=== Third place game ===
9 October 2021; 18:15	Aalborg Håndbold (Denmark)	34–29	(Brazil) EC Pinheiros	King Abdullah Sport City Hall, Jeddah; Attendance: 1,600; Referees: Gatelis, Mažeika (LTU)
9 October 2021; 18:15	Juul 6	(19–11)	Seifert 6	King Abdullah Sport City Hall, Jeddah; Attendance: 1,600; Referees: Gatelis, Mažeika (LTU)
9 October 2021; 18:15	1× (yellow card) 3× (suspension)	Report	2× (yellow card) 1× (suspension)	King Abdullah Sport City Hall, Jeddah; Attendance: 1,600; Referees: Gatelis, Mažeika (LTU)

=== Final ===
9 October 2021; 20:30	SC Magdeburg (Germany)	33–28	(Spain) FC Barcelona	King Abdullah Sport City Hall, Jeddah; Attendance: 3,257; Referees: Gubica, Milošević (CRO)
9 October 2021; 20:30	Magnússon 7	(19–16)	Mem 10	King Abdullah Sport City Hall, Jeddah; Attendance: 3,257; Referees: Gubica, Milošević (CRO)
9 October 2021; 20:30	2× (suspension)	Report	1× (yellow card) 3× (suspension)	King Abdullah Sport City Hall, Jeddah; Attendance: 3,257; Referees: Gubica, Milošević (CRO)

== Final ranking ==
Rank	Team
1st place, gold medalist(s)	(Germany) SC Magdeburg
2nd place, silver medalist(s)	(Spain) FC Barcelona
3rd place, bronze medalist(s)	(Denmark) Aalborg Håndbold
4	(Brazil) EC Pinheiros
5	(Egypt) Zamalek SC
6	(Qatar) Al Duhail SC
7	(Saudi Arabia) Al-Noor
8	(Australia) Sydney University
9	(Saudi Arabia) Al Wehda
10	(United States) San Francisco CalHeat
