= Michael Damgaard =

Danish handball player (born 1990)

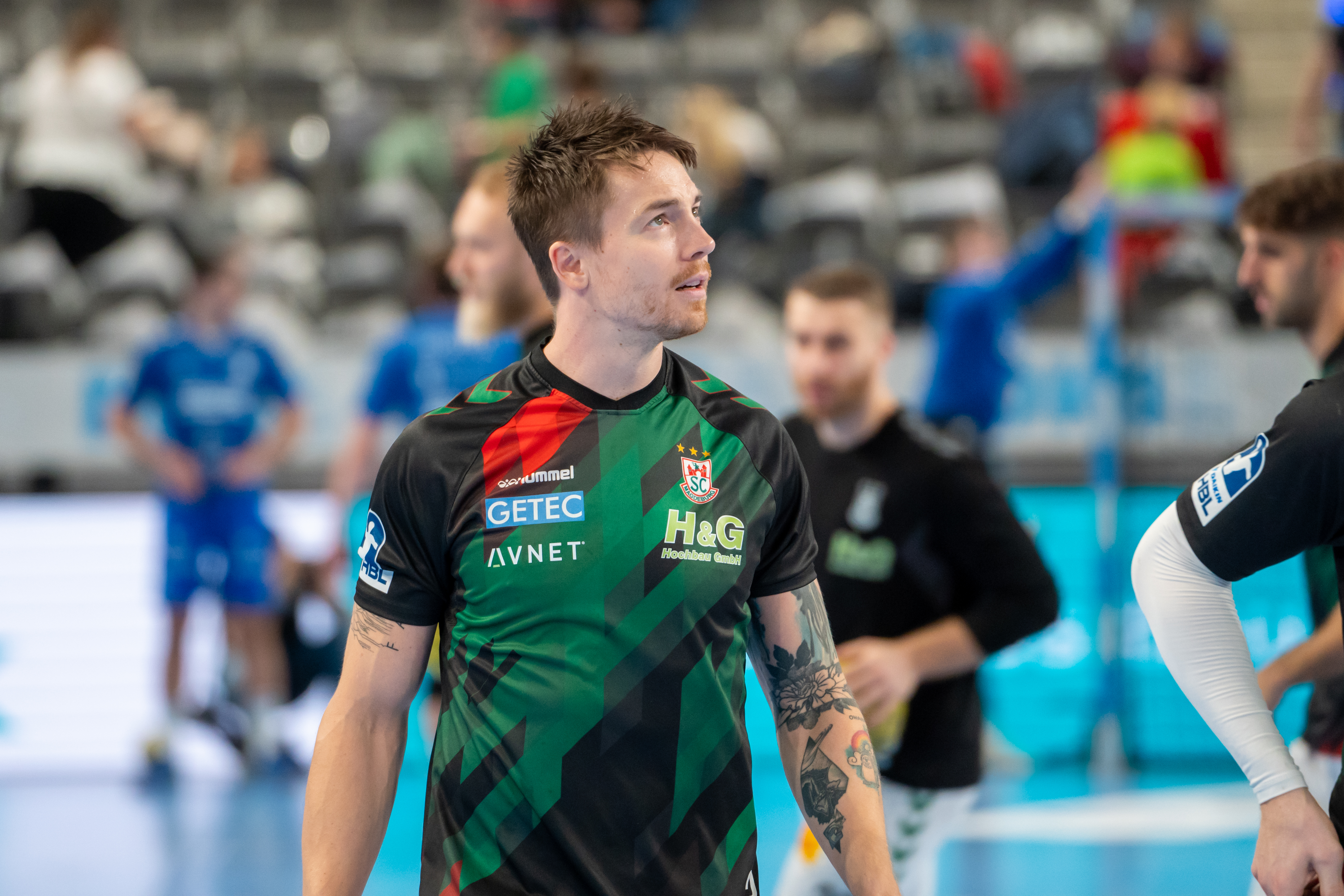

Personal information
- Full name: Michael Damgaard Nielsen
- Nationality: Danish
- Born: 18 March 1990 (age 36) Rødby, Denmark
- Height: 1.92 m (6 ft 4 in)

Sport
- Sport: Handball
- Position: Left back
- Current club: HØJ Elite
- Number: 34

Youth career
- Years: Team
- –: Rødby HK
- –: HMH Maribo
- –: Ajax København

Senior clubs
- Years: Team
- 2008–2010: GOG Svendborg TGI
- 2010–2015: TTH Holstebro
- 2015–2025: SC Magdeburg
- 2025-: HØJ Elite
National team
Years	Team	Apps	(Gls)
2013–	Denmark	103	(264)
Medal record
Olympic Games
Gold medal – first place	2016 Rio de Janeiro	Team
World Championship
Gold medal – first place	2023 Poland/Sweden
European Championship
Silver medal – second place	2024 Germany
Junior World Championship
Silver medal – second place	2011 Greece
- Updated on 29. January 2024

Michael Damgaard Nielsen (born 18 March 1990) is a Danish handball player for HØJ Elite and the Danish national team.

== Career ==
He has previously played for Danish sides GOG and Team Tvis Holstebro.

He debuted for the Danish national team in October 2014 and his first major international tournament was the 2015 World Championship in Qatar.

At the end of the 2014–15 season Damgaard had a shoulder injury, that required operation and kept him out for the rest of the season.

The following seasons he joined SC Magdeburg.

With SC Magdeburg he has won the IHF Super Globe three consecutive seasons; in 2021, 2022 and in 2023, the German Bundesliga in 2022, and the EHF Champions League 2023 when Magdeburg beat Polish team KS Kielce in the final 30–29. In 2024 he won the Bundesliga for the second time.

At the 2016 Olympics he won a gold medal with the Danish team; the first time ever the team won that medal.

== Private ==
He is the brother of fellow handball players Allan Damgaard Espersen and Morten Damgaard.

== Honours ==
- EHF Champions League:
  - Gold: 2023
  - Gold: 2025
- EHF Cup/EHF European League:
  - Gold: 2021
  - Silver: 2022
  - Bronze: 2013, 2017, 2018
- Handball-Bundesliga:
  - Gold: 2022, 2024
- German Cup
  - Gold: 2016, 2024
- IHF Super Globe:
  - Gold: 2021, 2022, 2023
- Danish Championship:
  - Bronze: 2014
- Summer Olympics:
  - Gold: 2016
