= Thais Fermo =

Brazilian handball player (born 1996)

Personal information
- Born: 11 July 1996 (age 30) Brazil
- Height: 1.74 m (5 ft 9 in)

Sport
- Sport: Handball
- Position: Left wing
- Current club: BM Porriño
National team
Years	Team	Apps	(Gls)
–	Brazil	8	(12)
Medal record
South and Central American Championship
Gold medal – first place	2022 Argentina

Thais Fermo (born 11 June 1996) is a Brazilian handball player for BM Porriño and the Brazilian national team.

She represented Brazil at the 2021 World Women's Handball Championship in Spain.
