= Guilherme Valadão Gama =

Brazilian handball player (born 1991)

Personal information
- Born: 25 January 1991 (age 35) São Bernardo do Campo, Brazil
- Height: 1.94 m (6 ft 4 in)

Sport
- Sport: Handball
- Position: Left back
- Current club: Steaua București

Senior clubs
- Years: Team
- –2013: São Bernardo
- 2013–2014: AD Ciudad de Guadalajara
- 2014–2016: BM Granollers
- 2017–2019: HC Taubaté
- 2019–: Steaua București
National team
Years	Team	Apps	(Gls)
–	Brazil	68	(174)
Medal record
Pan American Championship
Silver medal – second place	2014 Uruguay
South and Central American Championship
Silver medal – second place	2020 Brazil
South American Games
Gold medal – first place	2014 Chile	Team

Guilherme Valadão Gama (born 25 January 1991) is a Brazilian handballer for Romanian club Steaua București and the Brazilian national team.

He represented Brazil at the 2019 World Men's Handball Championship.

== Titles ==
- South and Central American Men's Club Handball Championship:
  - 2019, 2021
