= 2019 South and Central American Women's Club Handball Championship =

Tournament details
- Host country: Brazil
- Venue(s): 1 (in 1 host city)
- Dates: 12–16 March
- Teams: 6 (from 1 confederation)

Final positions
- Champions: (Brazil) UnC Concórdia (1st title)
- Runners-up: (Brazil) UNIP São Bernardo
- Third place: (Argentina) Ferro Carril Oeste
- Fourth place: (Uruguay) Scuola Italiana di Montevideo

Tournament statistics
- Matches played: 15
- Goals scored: 707 (47.13 per match)
- Top scorer(s): (Uruguay) Sofia Cherone (38 goals)

The 2019 South and Central American Women's Club Handball Championship is the first edition of the South and Central American Women's Club Handball Championship, took place in Concórdia, Brazil from 12 to 16 March 2019. It acts as the South and Central American qualifying tournament for the 2019 IHF Women's Super Globe.

== Standings ==
Pos	Team	Pld	W	D	L	GF	GA	GD	Pts	Qualification
1st place, gold medalist(s)	(Brazil) UnC Concórdia (H)	5	4	1	0	152	77	+75	9	2019 IHF Women's Super Globe
2nd place, silver medalist(s)	(Brazil) UNIP São Bernardo	5	4	1	0	128	85	+43	9	
3rd place, bronze medalist(s)	(Argentina) Ferro Carril Oeste	5	3	0	2	137	97	+40	6	
4	(Uruguay) Scuola Italiana di Montevideo	5	2	0	3	123	115	+8	4	
5	(Argentina) Dorrego Handball	5	1	0	4	116	106	+10	2	
6	(Chile) Club Vieux Gaulois	5	0	0	5	51	227	−176	0	

Updated to match(es) played on unknown. Source:
Rules for classification: 1) Points; 2) Head-to-head points; 3) Head-to-head goal difference; 4) Head-to-head goals scored; 5) Goal difference; 6) Goals scored; 7) Draw.
(H) Hosts

== Results ==
All times are local (UTC−3).

12 March 2019; 15:30	Dorrego Handball (Argentina)	19–21	(Brazil) UNIP São Bernardo	Centro de Eventos, Concórdia
12 March 2019; 15:30		(9–12)		Centro de Eventos, Concórdia

12 March 2019; 17:30	Ferro Carril Oeste (Argentina)	22–17	(Uruguay) Scuola Italiana di Montevideo	Centro de Eventos, Concórdia
12 March 2019; 17:30		(10–6)		Centro de Eventos, Concórdia

12 March 2019; 19:30	UnC Concórdia (Brazil)	49–7	(Chile) Club Vieux Gaulois	Centro de Eventos, Concórdia
12 March 2019; 19:30		(26–3)		Centro de Eventos, Concórdia

13 March 2019; 15:30	UNIP São Bernardo (Brazil)	20–19	(Argentina) Ferro Carril Oeste	Centro de Eventos, Concórdia
13 March 2019; 15:30		(11–9)		Centro de Eventos, Concórdia

13 March 2019; 17:30	Club Vieux Gaulois (Chile)	7–38	(Argentina) Dorrego Handball	Centro de Eventos, Concórdia
13 March 2019; 17:30		(6–13)		Centro de Eventos, Concórdia

13 March 2019; 19:30	Scuola Italiana di Montevideo (Uruguay)	16–32	(Brazil) UnC Concórdia	Centro de Eventos, Concórdia
13 March 2019; 19:30		(10–18)		Centro de Eventos, Concórdia

14 March 2019; 15:30	Dorrego Handball (Argentina)	22–25	(Uruguay) Scuola Italiana di Montevideo	Centro de Eventos, Concórdia
14 March 2019; 15:30		(13–12)		Centro de Eventos, Concórdia

14 March 2019; 17:30	UNIP São Bernardo (Brazil)	45–11	(Chile) Club Vieux Gaulois	Centro de Eventos, Concórdia
14 March 2019; 17:30		(18–5)		Centro de Eventos, Concórdia

14 March 2019; 19:30	Ferro Carril Oeste (Argentina)	21–27	(Brazil) UnC Concórdia	Centro de Eventos, Concórdia
14 March 2019; 19:30		(8–12)		Centro de Eventos, Concórdia

15 March 2019; 15:30	Ferro Carril Oeste (Argentina)	50–13	(Chile) Club Vieux Gaulois	Centro de Eventos, Concórdia
15 March 2019; 15:30		(26–5)		Centro de Eventos, Concórdia

15 March 2019; 17:30	Scuola Italiana di Montevideo (Uruguay)	20–26	(Brazil) UNIP São Bernardo	Centro de Eventos, Concórdia
15 March 2019; 17:30		(12–11)		Centro de Eventos, Concórdia

15 March 2019; 19:30	UnC Concórdia (Brazil)	28–17	(Argentina) Dorrego Handball	Centro de Eventos, Concórdia
15 March 2019; 19:30		(14–10)		Centro de Eventos, Concórdia

16 March 2019; 15:30	Dorrego Handball (Argentina)	20–25	(Argentina) Ferro Carril Oeste	Centro de Eventos, Concórdia
16 March 2019; 15:30		(11–13)		Centro de Eventos, Concórdia

16 March 2019; 17:30	Club Vieux Gaulois (Chile)	13–45	(Uruguay) Scuola Italiana di Montevideo	Centro de Eventos, Concórdia
16 March 2019; 17:30		(9–21)		Centro de Eventos, Concórdia

16 March 2019; 19:30	UnC Concórdia (Brazil)	16–16	(Brazil) UNIP São Bernardo	Centro de Eventos, Concórdia
16 March 2019; 19:30		(9–9)		Centro de Eventos, Concórdia
