= 2021 South and Central American Men's Club Handball Championship =

Tournament details
- Host country: Brazil
- Venue(s): 1 (in 1 host city)
- Dates: 24–27 August
- Teams: 4 (from 1 confederation)

Final positions
- Champions: (Brazil) EC Pinheiros (1st title)
- Runners-up: (Brazil) Handebol Taubaté
- Third place: (Brazil) Nacional Handebol Clube
- Fourth place: (Paraguay) Club Olimpia

Tournament statistics
- Matches played: 6
- Goals scored: 354 (59 per match)
- Attendance: 0 (0 per match)
- Top scorer(s): Guilherme Fernandes 17 Olimpia

The 2021 South and Central American Men's Club Handball Championship the 2nd edition of this tournament was held in Taubaté, Brazil from 24 to 27 August 2021. It acted as a qualifying tournament for the 2021 IHF Men's Super Globe.

== Participating teams ==
- (Brazil) Handebol Taubaté
- (Brazil) EC Pinheiros
- (Brazil) Nacional Handebol Clube
- (Paraguay) Club Olimpia

== Results ==
Pos	Team	Pld	W	D	L	GF	GA	GD	Pts	Qualification
1	(Brazil) EC Pinheiros	3	3	0	0	106	75	+31	6	2021 IHF Men's Super Globe
2	(Brazil) Handebol Taubaté (H)	3	2	0	1	101	68	+33	4	
3	(Brazil) Nacional Handebol Clube	3	1	0	2	83	99	−16	2	
4	(Paraguay) Club Olimpia	3	0	0	3	64	112	−48	0	

Source: COSCABAL
Rules for classification: 1) points; 2) points in the games between teams in question; 3) goal difference in the games between teams in question; 4) number of goals scored in the games between teams in question; 5) goal difference; 6) number of goals scored.
(H) Hosts

All times are local (UTC–3).

24 August; 16:30	EC Pinheiros (Brazil)	36–17	(Paraguay) Club Olimpia	Ginásio Emecal, Taubaté; Attendance: 0 Referees: Lemes, Sosa (URU)
24 August; 16:30	da Silva, Bapista 6	(17–10)	Fernandes 8	Ginásio Emecal, Taubaté; Attendance: 0 Referees: Lemes, Sosa (URU)
24 August; 16:30	1× (yellow card) 2× (suspension)	Report	5× (yellow card) 1× (suspension) 1× (red card)	Ginásio Emecal, Taubaté; Attendance: 0 Referees: Lemes, Sosa (URU)

24 August; 19:30	Handebol Taubaté (Brazil)	30–20	(Brazil) Nacional Handebol Clube	Ginásio Emecal, Taubaté; Attendance: 0 Referees: Santos, Dos Santos (BRA)
24 August; 19:30	Catarino, Cánepa 5	(16–9)	da Silva Garcia 5	Ginásio Emecal, Taubaté; Attendance: 0 Referees: Santos, Dos Santos (BRA)
24 August; 19:30	2× (yellow card) 7× (suspension)	Report	2× (yellow card) 6× (suspension)	Ginásio Emecal, Taubaté; Attendance: 0 Referees: Santos, Dos Santos (BRA)

25 August; 16:30	Club Olimpia (Paraguay)	21–45	(Brazil) Handebol Taubaté	Ginásio Emecal, Taubaté; Attendance: 0 Referees: Lemes, Sosa (URU)
25 August; 16:30	Fernandes 7	(11–23)	Alves 8	Ginásio Emecal, Taubaté; Attendance: 0 Referees: Lemes, Sosa (URU)
25 August; 16:30	1× (yellow card) 8× (suspension)	Report	4× (suspension)	Ginásio Emecal, Taubaté; Attendance: 0 Referees: Lemes, Sosa (URU)

25 August; 19:30	Nacional Handebol Clube (Brazil)	32–43	(Brazil) EC Pinheiros	Ginásio Emecal, Taubaté; Attendance: 0 Referees: Marques, Carapicuiba (BRA)
25 August; 19:30	Santana 6	(14–20)	three players 5	Ginásio Emecal, Taubaté; Attendance: 0 Referees: Marques, Carapicuiba (BRA)
25 August; 19:30	6× (suspension)	Report	2× (yellow card) 4× (suspension) 1× (red card)	Ginásio Emecal, Taubaté; Attendance: 0 Referees: Marques, Carapicuiba (BRA)

26 August; 16:30	Nacional Handebol Clube (Brazil)	31–26	(Paraguay) Club Olimpia	Ginásio Emecal, Taubaté; Attendance: 0 Referees: Marques, Geraldello (BRA)
26 August; 16:30	Almeida 6	(12–14)	Perez Arce 4	Ginásio Emecal, Taubaté; Attendance: 0 Referees: Marques, Geraldello (BRA)
26 August; 16:30	3× (suspension) 1× (red card)	Report	9× (suspension) 2× (red card)	Ginásio Emecal, Taubaté; Attendance: 0 Referees: Marques, Geraldello (BRA)

26 August; 19:30	Handebol Taubaté (Brazil)	26–27	(Brazil) EC Pinheiros	Ginásio Emecal, Taubaté; Attendance: 0 Referees: Lemes, Sosa (URU)
26 August; 19:30	Alves, Torriani 4	(12–13)	Seifert, Freitas 5	Ginásio Emecal, Taubaté; Attendance: 0 Referees: Lemes, Sosa (URU)
26 August; 19:30	1× (yellow card) 7× (suspension)	Report	2× (yellow card) 3× (suspension)	Ginásio Emecal, Taubaté; Attendance: 0 Referees: Lemes, Sosa (URU)
