= Sofia Cherone =

Uruguayan handball player (born 1988)

Personal information
- Nationality: Uruguayan
- Born: 21 May 1988 (age 38)

Sport
- Sport: Handball
National team
- Years: Team
- –: Uruguay

Sofia Cherone (born 21 May 1988) is a team handball player from Uruguay. She plays on the Uruguay women's national handball team, and participated at the 2011 World Women's Handball Championship in Brazil.

== Individual awards ==
- 2019 South and Central American Women's Club Handball Championship: Top scorer
