= São José, Santa Catarina =

São José
- Municipality
- Municipality of São José
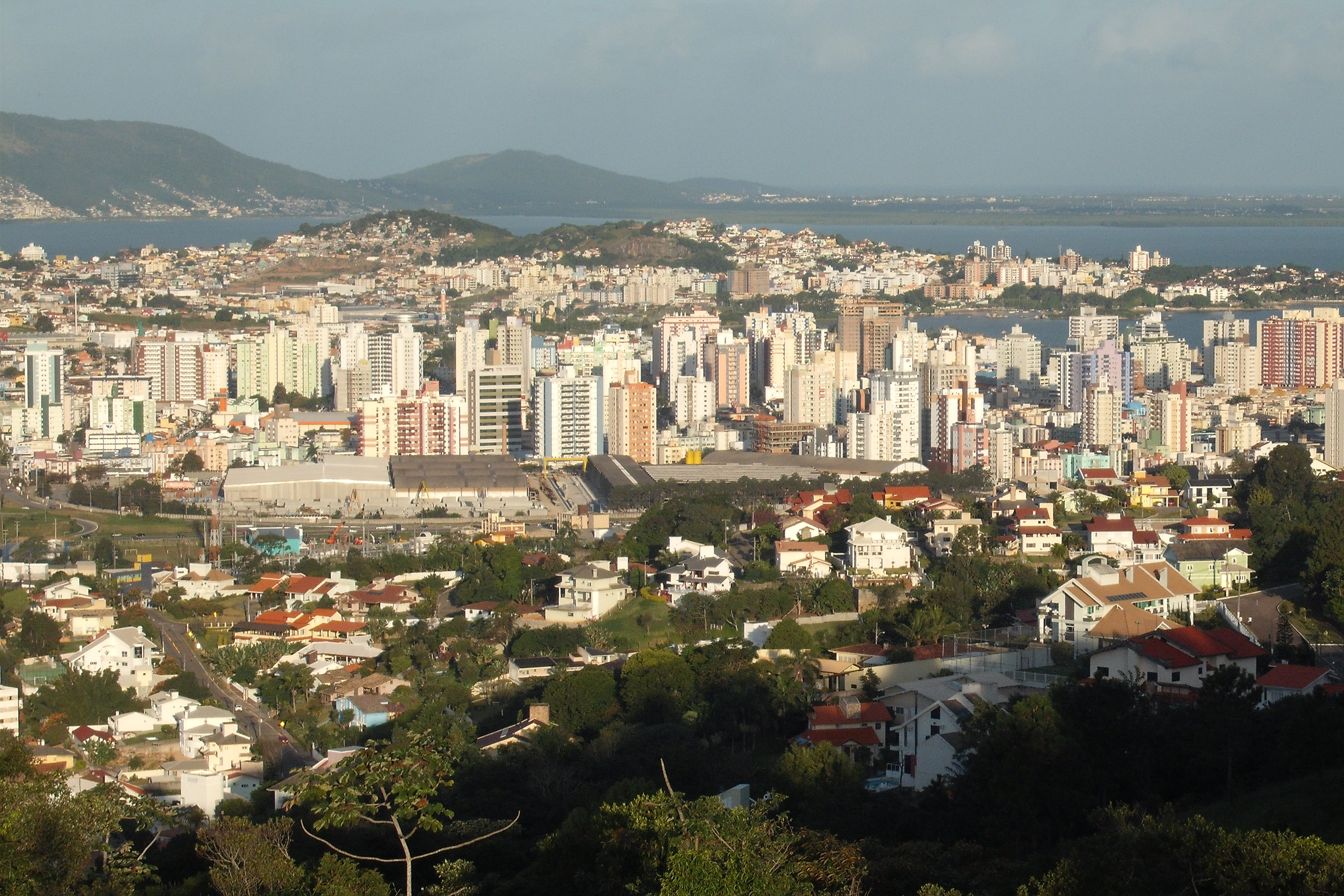
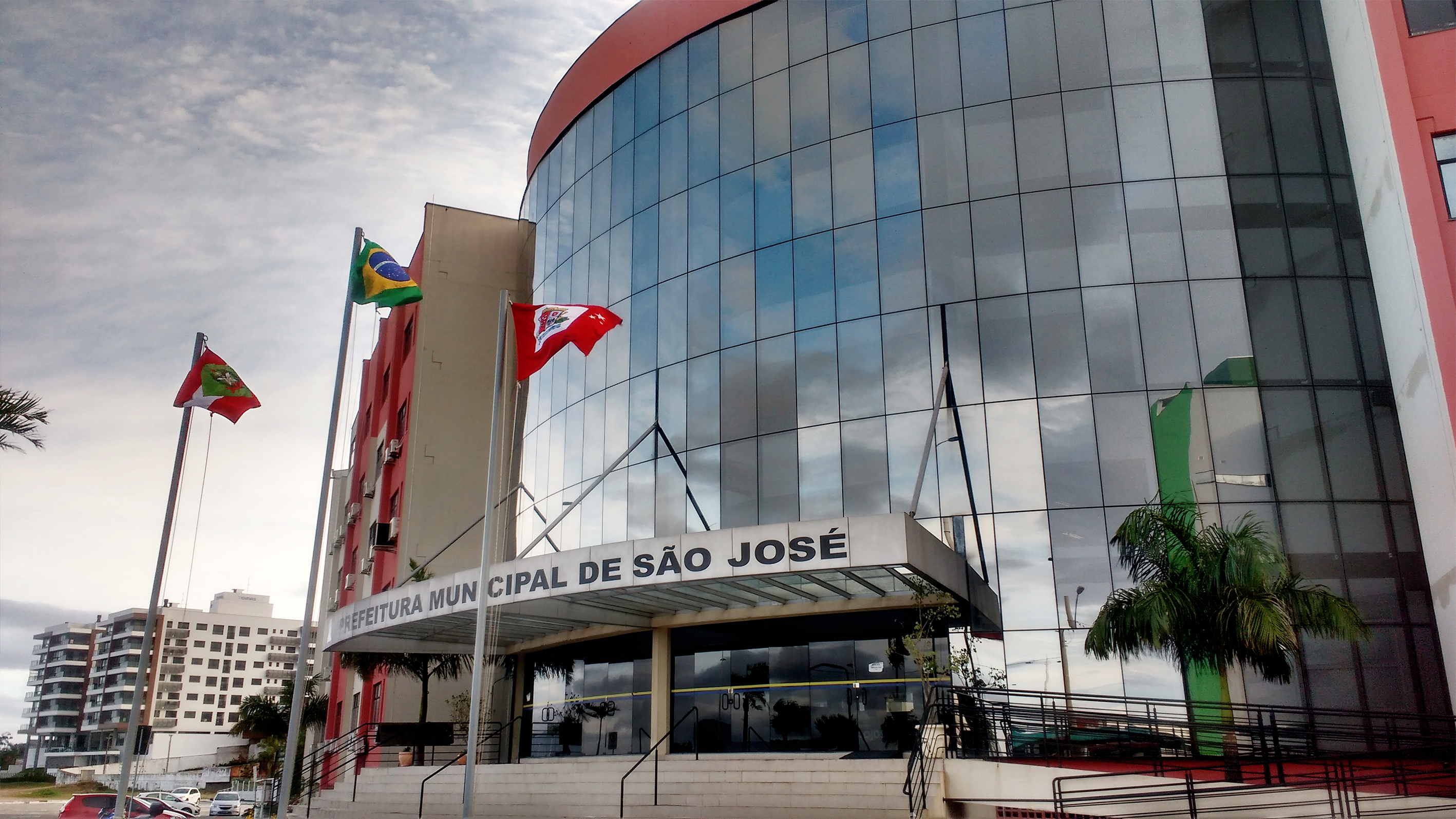
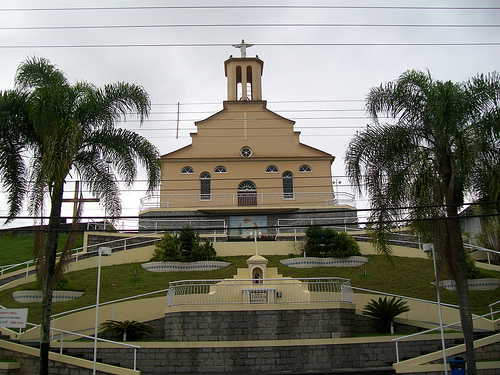
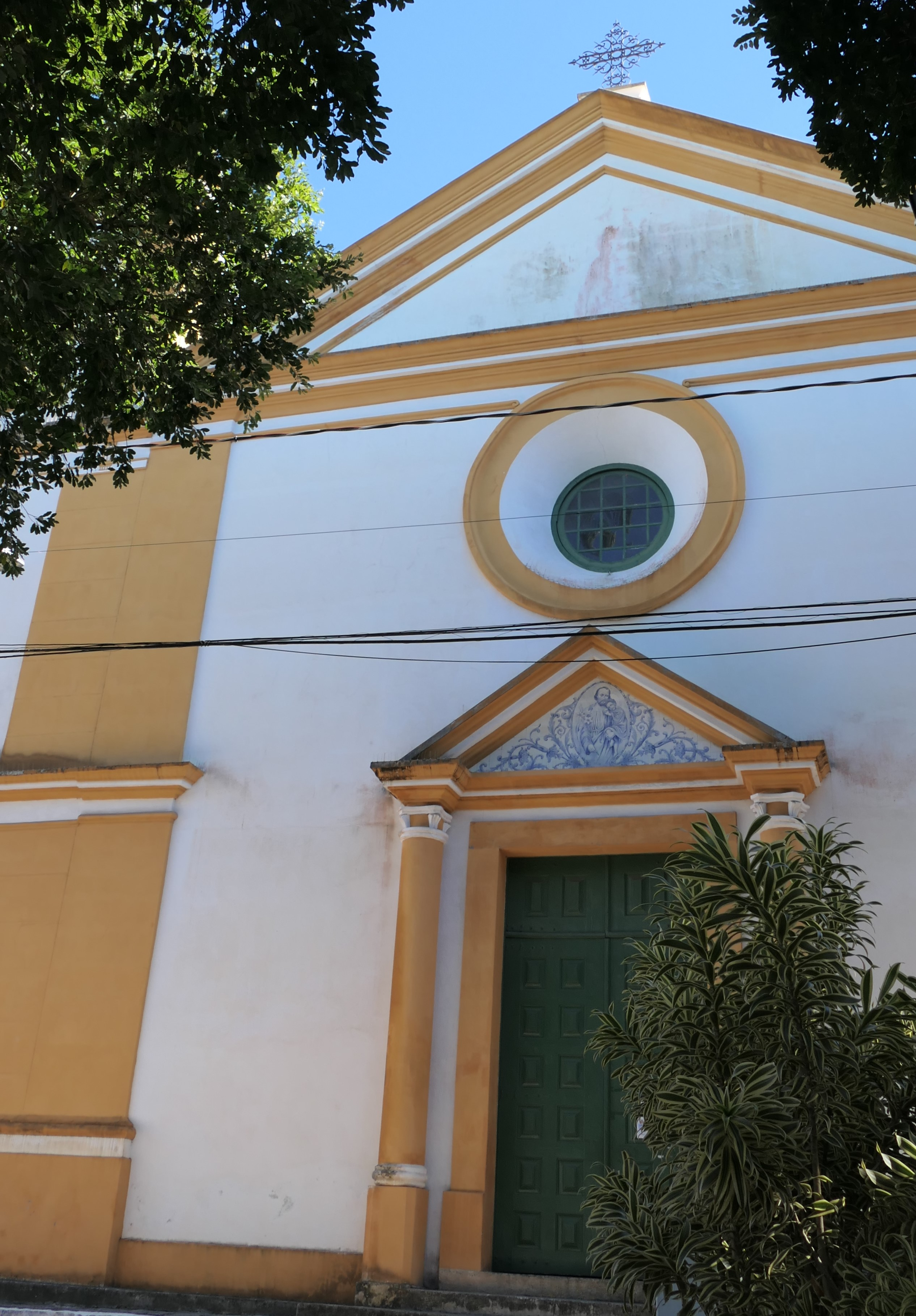
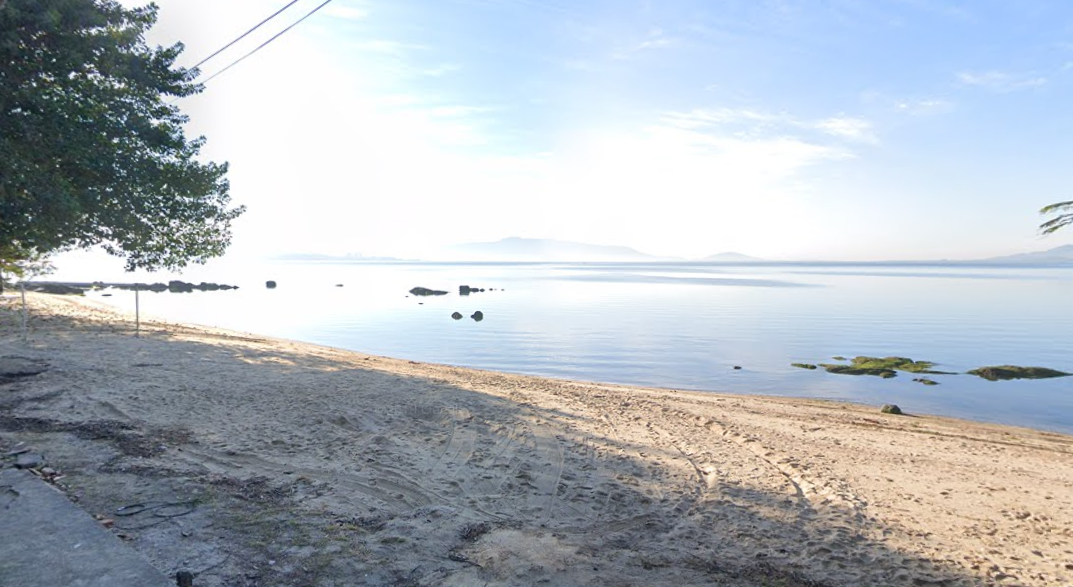
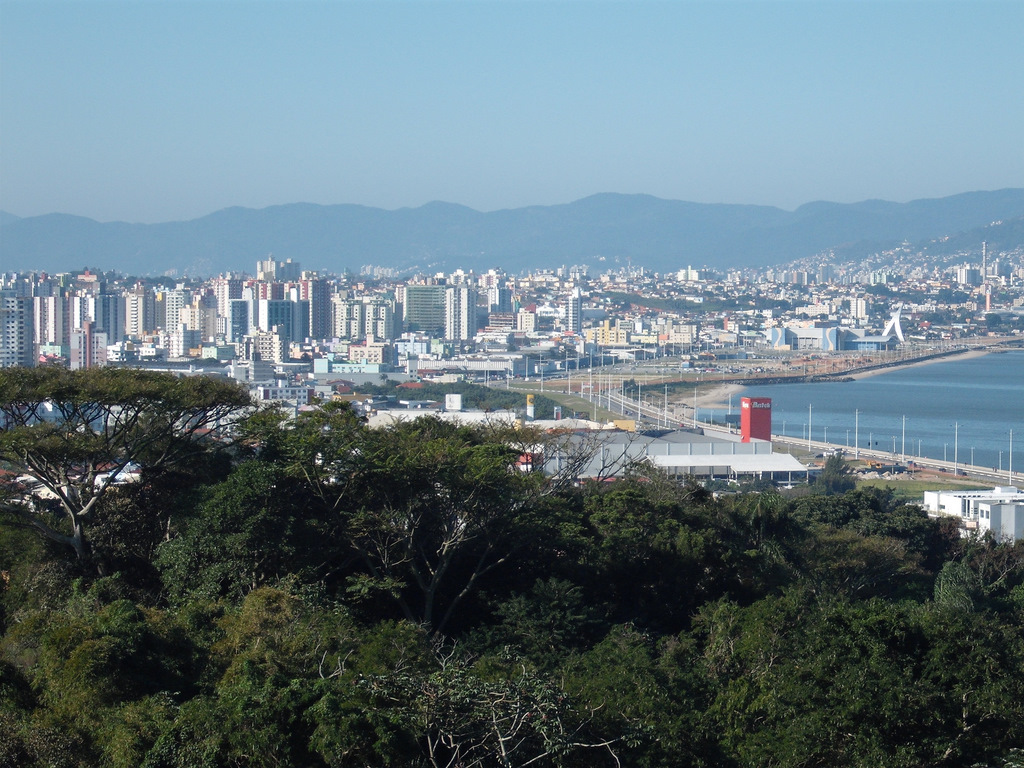

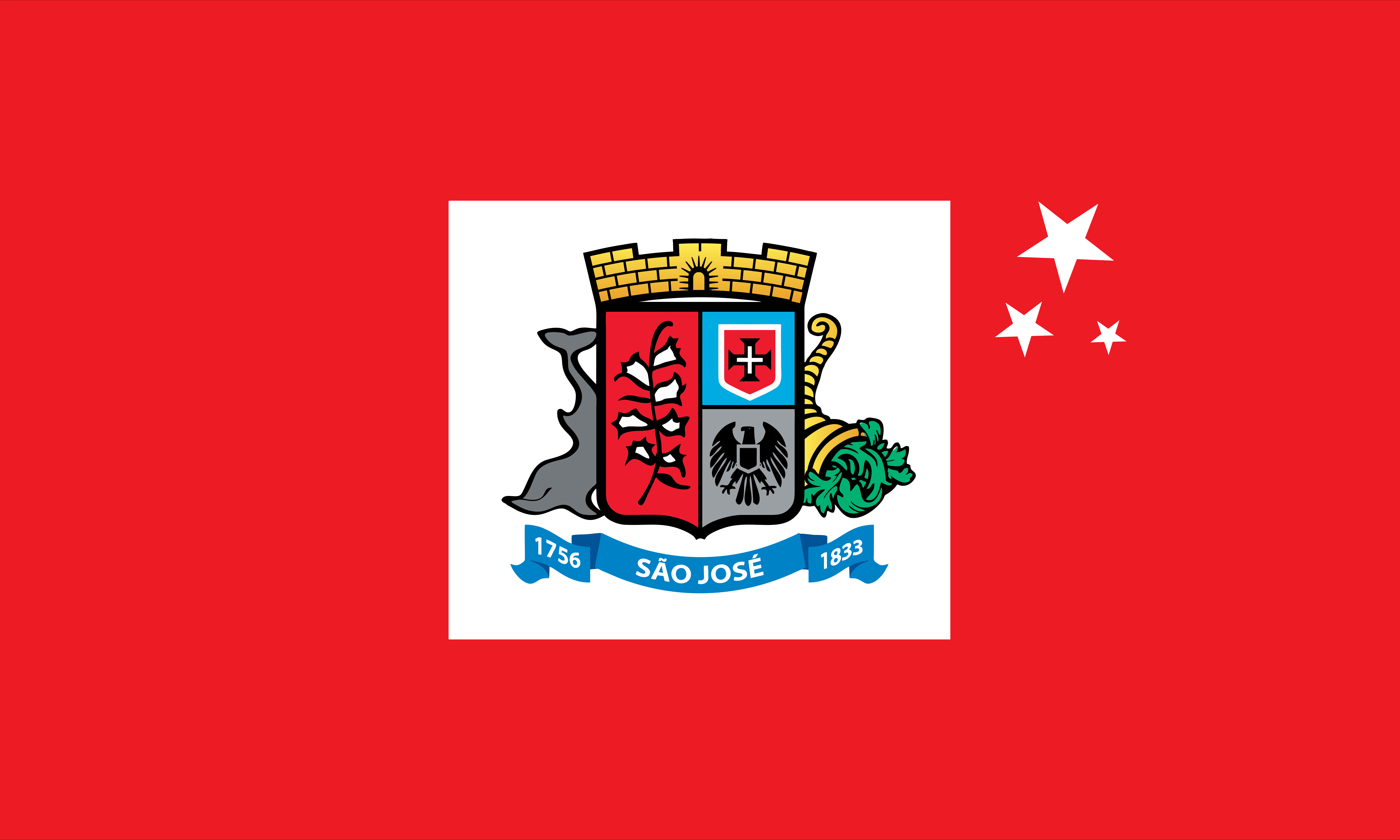
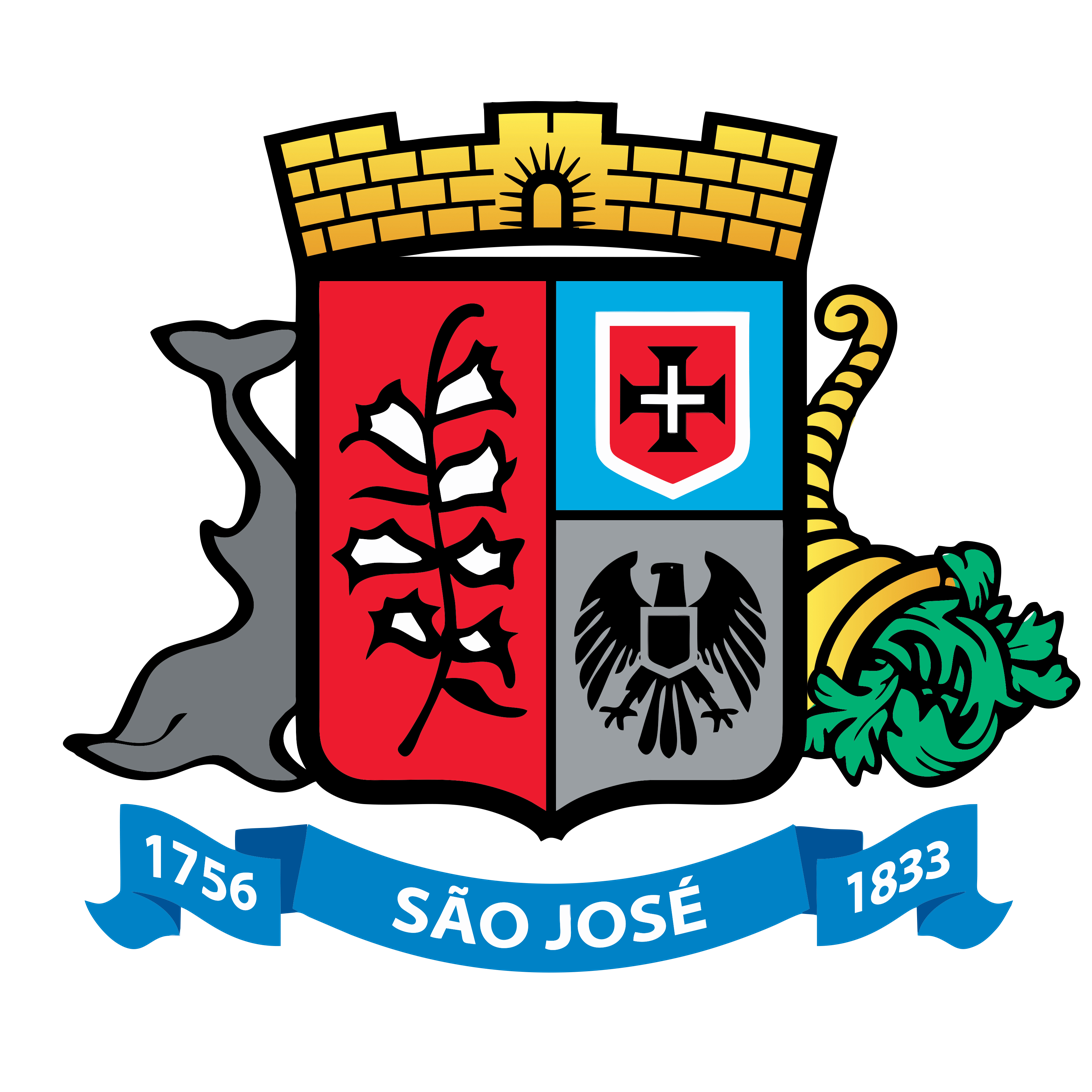
- Flag Coat of arms

- Location in Santa Catarina

- Location within Brazil
- Coordinates: 27°36′54″S 48°37′40″W
- Country: Brazil
- Region: South
- State: Santa Catarina
- Founded: March 19, 1750

Government
  - Mayor: Adeliana Dal Pont (PSD)

Area
  - Municipality: 113.171 km^{2} (43.696 sq mi)
- Elevation: 0 m (0 ft)

Population (2025)
  - Municipality: 295,658
  - Density: 2,612.49/km^{2} (6,766.32/sq mi)
  - Urban: 208,017
  - Metro: 877,706
- Time zone: UTC−3 (BRT)
- HDI (2010): 0.809 – very high
- Website: pmsj.sc.gov.br

São José is a city in Santa Catarina, Brazil. It is approximately 5 km from and encircles the continental section of Florianópolis.

The municipality of São José, located in Grande Florianópolis, is the fourth oldest in Santa Catarina and was colonized on October 26, 1750, by 182 Azorean couples, from the islands of Pico, Terceira, São Jorge, Faial, Graciosa and São Miguel. In 1829, it received the first nucleus of German colonization of the State. Rapid development, coupled with population growth and economic power, meant that, on March 1, 1833, through the Resolution of the President of the Province, Feliciano Nunes Pires, São José passed from parish to village (municipality) and, in May 1856, through Provincial Law No. 415, was elevated to the city. Not being very touristy in nature, unlike Florianópolis, São José has attracted industries such as telecommunication equipment, textiles, and food processing.

The main district of São José are Kobrasol and the Historic Centre.

São José is ranked 21st on the HDI in Brazil.

The major BR-101 highway passes through São José, making the city a gateway to Florianópolis.
