= South and Central American Women's Club Handball Championship =

Handball Championship

- First season: 2019
- No. of teams: 12
- Confederation: SCAHC (South America/Central America)
- Most recent champion: (Argentina) SEDALO
- Most titles: (Brazil) EC Pinheiros (3 titles)
- Level on pyramid: 1
- Website: https://handballsca.tv/
- 2026

The South and Central Women's Club Handball Championship, organized by the South and Central America Handball Confederation, is the official competition for women's handball clubs of South and Central America qualifying the champion of the competition to the IHF Women's Super Globe.

== Summaries ==
Year	Host	Final			Third place match		
Year	Host	Champion	Score	Runner-up	Third place	Score	Fourth place
2019; Details	(Brazil); Concórdia	(Brazil); UnC Concórdia	No playoffs	(Brazil); UNIP São Bernardo	(Uruguay); Scuola Italiana di Montevideo	No playoffs	(Argentina); Ferro Carril Oeste
2022; Details	(Argentina); Buenos Aires	(Brazil); EC Pinheiros	19–17	(Brazil); Clube Português	(Argentina); River Plate	23–18	(Argentina); Ferro Carril Oeste
2023; Details	(Brazil); São Paulo	(Brazil); EC Pinheiros	29–26 (ET)	(Argentina); River Plate	(Brazil); Clube Português	30–23	(Brazil); Nacional Handebol Clube
2024; Details	(Brazil); São José	(Brazil); EC Pinheiros	25–16	(Argentina); River Plate	(Chile); Ovalle Balonmano	23–18	(Brazil); Nacional Handebol Clube
2025; Details	(Chile); Santiago	(Uruguay); Layva	20–19	(Argentina); SEDALO	(Brazil); EC Pinheiros	27–25	(Argentina); River Plate
2026; Details	(Paraguay); Asunción	(Argentina); SEDALO	24–23	(Brazil); EC Pinheiros	(Argentina); Jockey Club	28–19	(Uruguay); Layva

== Medal table ==
=== Per Club ===
Rank	Club	Gold	Silver	Bronze	Total
1	(Brazil) EC Pinheiros	3	1	1	5
2	(Argentina) SEDALO	1	1	0	2
3	(Uruguay) Layva	1	0	0	1
3	(Brazil) UnC Concórdia	1	0	0	1
5	(Argentina) River Plate	0	2	1	3
6	(Brazil) Clube Português	0	1	1	2
7	(Brazil) UNIP São Bernardo	0	1	0	1
8	(Argentina) Jockey Club	0	0	1	1
8	(Chile) Ovalle Balonmano	0	0	1	1
8	(Uruguay) Scuola Italiana di Montevideo	0	0	1	1
Totals (10 entries)		6	6	6	18

=== Per Nation ===
Rank	Nation	Gold	Silver	Bronze	Total
1	Brazil	4	3	2	9
2	Argentina	1	3	2	6
3	Uruguay	1	0	1	2
4	Chile	0	0	1	1
Totals (4 entries)		6	6	6	18
