= Scuola Italiana di Montevideo =

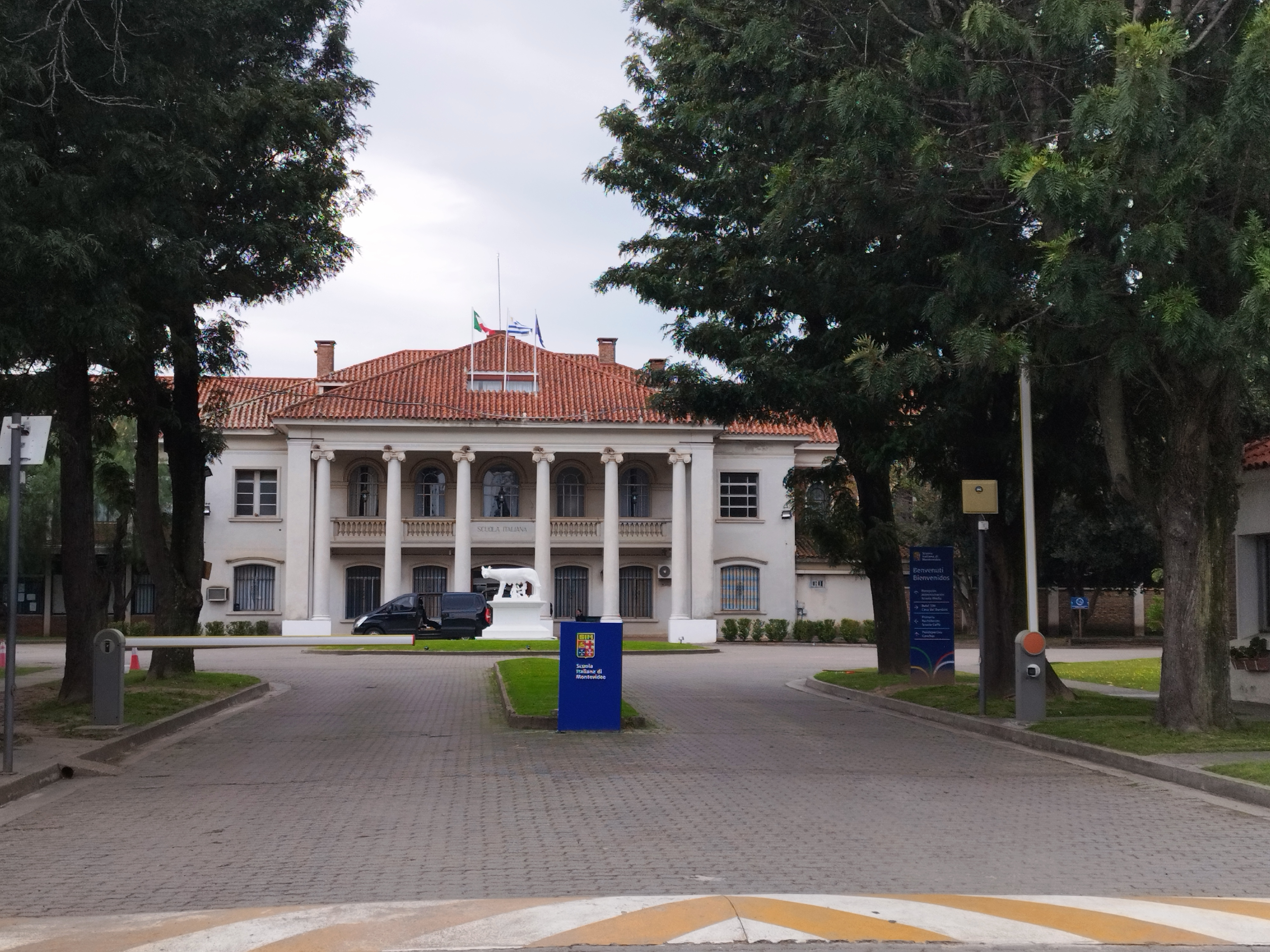

Location
- Gral. French 2380 Montevideo 11500; Montevideo; Uruguay
- Coordinates: 34.871574°S 56.04807360000001°W

Information
- Type: Private, catholic, bilingual
- Established: 17 September 1886
- Website: scuolaitaliana.edu.uy

Scuola Italiana di Montevideo (SIM) is an Italian international school in Carrasco, Montevideo, Uruguay. Its serves preschool (Casa dei bambini) until bachillerato or liceo Italiano, the senior high school programs.

The campus has 13 hectares (32 acres) of area. The campus includes five courts and four gymnasiums.

== History ==
The school was established on 17 September 1886.

== Notable alumni ==
- Diego Forlán – footballer
- Irene Moreira – politician
- Lorena Ponce de León – landscape architect and First Lady of Uruguay (2020–23)
