= Greenland men's national handball team =

Greenland

Information
- Nickname: Kalaallit (Greenlanders)
- Association: Greenland Handball Federation
- Coach: Johannes Groth
- Most caps: Rasmus Larsen
- Most goals: Jakob Larsen

Colours
1st	2nd

Results

World Championship
- Appearances: 3 (First in 2001)
- Best result: 20th (2001)

Pan American Championship
- Appearances: 11 (First in 1998)
- Best result: (bronze) 3rd (2002, 2006)
- Last updated on Unknown.

The Greenland national handball team (Danish: Grønlands håndboldlandshold) is the national handball team of Greenland and is controlled by the Greenland Handball Federation. Greenland is the only non-independent territory to have its team taken part in the World Men's Handball Championship.

== Tournament record ==
=== World Championship ===
World Championship record
Year	Round	Position	GP	W	D	L	GS	GA
1938 to 1997	Did not participate							
Egypt 1999	Did not qualify							
France 2001	First round	20th place	5	1	0	4	85	140
Portugal 2003	First round	24th place	5	0	0	5	100	152
Tunisia 2005	Did not qualify							
Germany 2007	Preliminary round	22nd place	6	1	0	5	160	197
2009 to 2025	Did not qualify							
2027 to 2031	TBD							
Total	3/30	–	16	2	0	14	345	489

=== Pan American Championship ===
Year	Position	Pld	W	D	L	GS	GA	+/–
(Mexico) 1980	Did not enter							
(Argentina) 1981	Did not enter							
(United States) 1983	Did not enter							
(Brazil) 1985	Did not enter							
(Cuba) 1989	Did not enter							
(Brazil) 1994	Did not enter							
(United States) 1996	Did not enter							
(Cuba) 1998	5th	6	3	0	3	127	155	-28
(Brazil) 2000	5th	5	3	0	2	125	114	+11
(Argentina) 2002	3rd	5	4	0	1	127	83	+44
(Chile) 2004	5th							
(Brazil) 2006	3rd							
(Brazil) 2008	5th							
(Chile) 2010	6th							
(Argentina) 2012	5th							
(Uruguay) 2014	5th							
(Argentina) 2016	5th							
(Greenland) 2018	4th							
Total	11/18	-	-	-	-	-	-	−

=== Nor.Ca. Championship ===
North American Championship record
Year	Position	GP	W	D	L	GS	GA
Mexico 2014	1st place	4	4	0	0	131	109
Mexico 2018	Did not participate						
Mexico 2022	2nd place	4	1	1	2	113	122
Mexico 2024	3rd place	6	4	0	2	172	162
United States 2026	2nd place	4	2	0	2	117	111
Total	4/5	18	11	1	6	533	504

== Player statistics ==
Most capped players
Player	Games	Position
Rasmus Larsen	110	P
Jakob Larsen	87	
Hans Peter Motzfeldt-Kyed	84	OB

Top scorers
Player	Goals	Position
Jakob Larsen	506	
Hans Peter Motzfeldt-Kyed	313	OB
Rasmus Larsen	229	P
Minik Dahl Høegh	190	OB
Angutimmarik Kreutzmann	157	OB
