= 2026 Nor.Ca. Men's Handball Championship =

Tournament details
- Host country: United States
- Venue: 1 (in 1 host city)
- Dates: 12–16 May
- Teams: 4 (from 1 confederation)

Final positions
- Champions: United States (2nd title)
- Runners-up: Greenland
- Third place: Mexico
- Fourth place: Canada

Tournament statistics
- Matches played: 8
- Goals scored: 420 (52.5 per match)
- Attendance: 2,100 (263 per match)
- Top scorers: (United States) Samuel Hoddersen (22 goals)

The 2026 Nor.Ca. Men's Handball Championship was the fifth edition of the tournament and takes place in Bettendorf, United States from 12 to 16 May 2026. The winning team qualified for the 2027 World Men's Handball Championship.

The United States won their second title after a win over Greenland.

== Teams ==
Team	Appearance(s)					Previous best performance (Note: Bold text indicates they hosted that edition.)
Team	Total	First	Last	Streak	2024	Previous best performance
Canada	3rd	2018	2024	2	5th	Runners-up (2018)
Greenland	4th	2014	2024	3	3rd	Champions (2014)
Mexico	5th	2014	2024	5	2nd	Runners-up (2024)
United States (H)	5th	2014	2024	5	4th	Champions (2022)

== Preliminary round ==
=== Standings ===
Pos	Team	Pld	W	D	L	GF	GA	GD	Pts	Qualification
1	United States (H)	3	3	0	0	100	68	+32	6	Final
2	Greenland	3	2	0	1	99	79	+20	4	Final
3	Canada	3	1	0	2	60	93	−33	2	Third place match
4	Mexico	3	0	0	3	71	90	−19	0	Third place match

Source: IHF
Rules for classification: 1) points; 2) head-to-head points; 3) head-to-head goal difference; 4) head-to-head number of goals scored; 5) goal difference.
(H) Hosts

=== Results ===
All times are local (UTC−5).

12 May 2026; 17:00	Greenland	40–20	Canada	TBK Bank Sports Complex, Bettendorf; Attendance: 200; Referees: Bohoiavlenska, Molina-Hidalgo (USA)
12 May 2026; 17:00	Lyberth 5	(17–7)	Kuypers 4	TBK Bank Sports Complex, Bettendorf; Attendance: 200; Referees: Bohoiavlenska, Molina-Hidalgo (USA)
12 May 2026; 17:00	2× (suspension)	Report	2× (suspension) 1× (red card)	TBK Bank Sports Complex, Bettendorf; Attendance: 200; Referees: Bohoiavlenska, Molina-Hidalgo (USA)

12 May 2026; 19:00	Mexico	27–32	United States	TBK Bank Sports Complex, Bettendorf; Attendance: 250; Referees: Bíró, Kiss (HUN)
12 May 2026; 19:00	Morales 6	(16–18)	Chan Blanco 8	TBK Bank Sports Complex, Bettendorf; Attendance: 250; Referees: Bíró, Kiss (HUN)
12 May 2026; 19:00	1× (suspension)	Report	2× (suspension)	TBK Bank Sports Complex, Bettendorf; Attendance: 250; Referees: Bíró, Kiss (HUN)

13 May 2026; 17:00	Canada	23–19	Mexico	TBK Bank Sports Complex, Bettendorf; Attendance: 150; Referees: Johansen, Petersen (GRL)
13 May 2026; 17:00	Kuypers 10	(10–9)	Anguiano, Sandoval 5	TBK Bank Sports Complex, Bettendorf; Attendance: 150; Referees: Johansen, Petersen (GRL)
13 May 2026; 17:00	3× (suspension)	Report	1× (yellow card) 2× (suspension)	TBK Bank Sports Complex, Bettendorf; Attendance: 150; Referees: Johansen, Petersen (GRL)

13 May 2026; 19:00	United States	34–24	Greenland	TBK Bank Sports Complex, Bettendorf; Attendance: 250; Referees: Monjaras, López (MEX)
13 May 2026; 19:00	Chan Blanco, Hueter 5	(16–11)	Andersen, Sandgreen 5	TBK Bank Sports Complex, Bettendorf; Attendance: 250; Referees: Monjaras, López (MEX)
13 May 2026; 19:00	1× (yellow card) 2× (suspension)	Report	1× (suspension)	TBK Bank Sports Complex, Bettendorf; Attendance: 250; Referees: Monjaras, López (MEX)

14 May 2026; 17:00	Mexico	25–35	Greenland	TBK Bank Sports Complex, Bettendorf; Attendance: 150; Referees: Bíró, Kiss (HUN)
14 May 2026; 17:00	Rivas 7	(10–17)	Høegh 7	TBK Bank Sports Complex, Bettendorf; Attendance: 150; Referees: Bíró, Kiss (HUN)
14 May 2026; 17:00	5× (suspension)	Report	4× (suspension)	TBK Bank Sports Complex, Bettendorf; Attendance: 150; Referees: Bíró, Kiss (HUN)

14 May 2026; 19:00	United States	34–17	Canada	TBK Bank Sports Complex, Bettendorf; Attendance: 350; Referees: Johansen, Petersen (GRL)
14 May 2026; 19:00	Hoddersen 8	(18–6)	C. Gaspard, Renaud 3	TBK Bank Sports Complex, Bettendorf; Attendance: 350; Referees: Johansen, Petersen (GRL)
14 May 2026; 19:00	1× (yellow card) 4× (suspension)	Report	1× (yellow card) 4× (suspension)	TBK Bank Sports Complex, Bettendorf; Attendance: 350; Referees: Johansen, Petersen (GRL)

== Final round ==
=== Third place match ===
16 May 2026; 11:15	Canada	17–23	Mexico	TBK Bank Sports Complex, Bettendorf; Attendance: 250; Referees: Bohoiavlenska, Molina-Hidalgo (USA)
16 May 2026; 11:15	Coin 5	(7–12)	Rivas 6	TBK Bank Sports Complex, Bettendorf; Attendance: 250; Referees: Bohoiavlenska, Molina-Hidalgo (USA)
16 May 2026; 11:15	4× (suspension) 1× (red card)	Report	3× (suspension)	TBK Bank Sports Complex, Bettendorf; Attendance: 250; Referees: Bohoiavlenska, Molina-Hidalgo (USA)

=== Final ===
16 May 2026; 15:45	United States	32–18	Greenland	TBK Bank Sports Complex, Bettendorf; Attendance: 500; Referees: Bíró, Kiss (HUN)
16 May 2026; 15:45	Hueter 6	(13–10)	Høegh, Jensen 3	TBK Bank Sports Complex, Bettendorf; Attendance: 500; Referees: Bíró, Kiss (HUN)
16 May 2026; 15:45	2× (suspension)	Report	1× (yellow card) 2× (suspension)	TBK Bank Sports Complex, Bettendorf; Attendance: 500; Referees: Bíró, Kiss (HUN)

== Final standing ==
Rank	Team
1st place, gold medalist(s)	United States
2nd place, silver medalist(s)	Greenland
3rd place, bronze medalist(s)	Mexico
4	Canada

Qualified for the 2027 World Men's Handball Championship

== Statistics ==
=== Top goalscorers ===
Rank	Name	Goals	Shots	%
1	(United States) Samuel Hoddersen	22	30	73
2	(Canada) Colton Kuypers	18	39	46
3	(Mexico) Manuel Rivas	17	30	57
4	(United States) Ian Hueter	16	22	73
5	(Mexico) Jesús Sandoval	15	35	43
5	(Greenland) Minik Dahl Høegh	15	21	71

=== Top goalkeepers ===
Rank	Name	%	Saves	Shots
1	(United States) Benjamin Pedersen	48	20	42
2	(Mexico) Santiago Román	38	30	80
3	(United States) Pal Merkovszky	37	37	101
4	(Greenland) Isak Olsen	36	41	113
5	(Mexico) Victor Saldago	33	27	81
