= 2019 IHF North American and Caribbean Emerging Nations Championship =

1st Men’s North American and Caribbean Emerging Nations Championship

Tournament details
- Host country: Dominican Republic
- Venue: 1 (in 1 host city)
- Dates: 8–14 April
- Teams: 12 (from 1 confederation)

Final positions
- Champions: Cuba (1st title)
- Runners-up: United States
- Third place: Dominican Republic
- Fourth place: Puerto Rico

Tournament statistics
- Matches played: 30
- Goals scored: 1,821 (60.7 per match)
- Top scorers: (Dominican Republic) Luis Angel Tejeda (43 goals)

The 2019 IHF North American and Caribbean Emerging Nations Championship was the first edition of the IHF North American and Caribbean Emerging Nations Championship held in the Dominican Republic under the aegis of International Handball Federation. The tournament was held in Santo Domingo from 8 to 14 April 2019. The winner qualified for the 2019 IHF Emerging Nations Championship held in Georgia from June 8 to 16 2019.

A total of 12 countries participate in the tournament.

== Venues ==
All games are played at the Pabellon de Balomano in Santo Domingo.

== Participating teams ==
Country
Barbados
Canada
Cuba
Dominica
Dominican Republic
Haiti
Mexico
Martinique
Puerto Rico
Saint Kitts and Nevis
Trinidad and Tobago
United States

== Draw ==
The draw was held on 25 March 2019.

=== Seeding ===
Pot 1	Pot 2	Pot 3
Canada; Dominican Republic; Mexico; United States	Cuba; Haiti; Martinique; Puerto Rico	Barbados; Dominica; Saint Kitts and Nevis; Trinidad and Tobago

=== Draw Procedure ===
1. Teams in pot 3 are drawn to groups A to D in row 3.

2. Teams in pot 2 are drawn to groups A to D in row 2.

3. Organizer (Dominican Republic) has the prerogative to assign itself to a group of its choice in row 1.

4. The remaining teams in pot 1 are drawn to groups A to D in row 1.

=== Result ===
Group A	Group B	Group C	Group D
Canada; Puerto Rico; Dominica	Mexico; Martinique; Trinidad and Tobago	Dominican Republic; Haiti; Saint Kitts and Nevis	United States; Cuba; Barbados

== Referees ==
The following referees were appointed for the championship:

Referees
Argentina	Santiago Correa; Agustin Conberse
Canada	Jeremy Deschamps; Charles Mainville
Cuba	Raymel Reyes; Alexys Zuñiga
Cuba	Irennys Céspedes; Dailin Caatellanos
Dominican Republic	Luis Lauri De Jesus; Yeison Manuel Agramonte

Referees
Mexico	José María Rodríguez; Ismael Fonseca
Mexico	Omar Osalde; Juan Cobá
Uruguay	Germán Araujo; Nicolás Perdomo
United States	Christoph Kraemer; Thorben Lorenz

== Preliminary round ==
All times are local (UTC–4).

=== Group A ===
Pos	Team	Pld	W	D	L	GF	GA	GD	Pts	Qualification
1	Puerto Rico	2	2	0	0	77	40	+37	4	Quarterfinals
2	Canada	2	1	0	1	69	41	+28	2	Quarterfinals
3	Dominica	2	0	0	2	34	99	−65	0	

Source: IHF
Rules for classification: 1) points; 2) head-to-head points; 3) head-to-head goal difference; 4) head-to-head number of goals scored; 5) goal difference.

8 April 2019; 14:00	Dominica	14–48	Canada	Pabellon de Balomano, Santo Domingo; Referees: Kraemer, Lorenz (USA)
8 April 2019; 14:00	Regy 5	(8–26)	Dupéré 8	Pabellon de Balomano, Santo Domingo; Referees: Kraemer, Lorenz (USA)
8 April 2019; 14:00	2× (yellow card) 4× (suspension)	Report	1× (suspension)	Pabellon de Balomano, Santo Domingo; Referees: Kraemer, Lorenz (USA)

9 April 2019; 14:00	Puerto Rico	51–19	Dominica	Pabellon de Balomano, Santo Domingo; Referees: Caatellanos, Céspedes (CUB)
9 April 2019; 14:00	Hiraldo 8	(28–11)	J. Bellot 7	Pabellon de Balomano, Santo Domingo; Referees: Caatellanos, Céspedes (CUB)
9 April 2019; 14:00	2× (yellow card) 1× (suspension)	Report	5× (suspension)	Pabellon de Balomano, Santo Domingo; Referees: Caatellanos, Céspedes (CUB)

10 April 2019; 16:00	Canada	21–26	Puerto Rico	Pabellon de Balomano, Santo Domingo; Referees: Reyes, Zuñiga (CUB)
10 April 2019; 16:00	Dupéré, Hasty 4	(9–14)	Nazario Santiago 11	Pabellon de Balomano, Santo Domingo; Referees: Reyes, Zuñiga (CUB)
10 April 2019; 16:00	1× (yellow card) 5× (suspension) 1× (red card)	Report	2× (yellow card) 7× (suspension)	Pabellon de Balomano, Santo Domingo; Referees: Reyes, Zuñiga (CUB)

=== Group B ===
Pos	Team	Pld	W	D	L	GF	GA	GD	Pts	Qualification
1	Martinique	2	2	0	0	82	35	+47	4	Quarterfinals
2	Mexico	2	1	0	1	70	38	+32	2	Quarterfinals
3	Trinidad and Tobago	2	0	0	2	20	99	−79	0	

Source: IHF
Rules for classification: 1) points; 2) head-to-head points; 3) head-to-head goal difference; 4) head-to-head number of goals scored; 5) goal difference.

8 April 2019; 16:00	Trinidad and Tobago	11–44	Mexico	Pabellon de Balomano, Santo Domingo; Referees: Araujo, Perdomo (URU)
8 April 2019; 16:00	Jackson 4	(3–20)	Bayardo 10	Pabellon de Balomano, Santo Domingo; Referees: Araujo, Perdomo (URU)
8 April 2019; 16:00	1× (yellow card) 4× (suspension)	Report	1× (suspension)	Pabellon de Balomano, Santo Domingo; Referees: Araujo, Perdomo (URU)

9 April 2019; 16:00	Martinique	55–9	Trinidad and Tobago	Pabellon de Balomano, Santo Domingo; Referees: Mainville, Deschamps (CAN)
9 April 2019; 16:00	Joseph Mathuri 9	(26–6)	Jackson, Solomon 3	Pabellon de Balomano, Santo Domingo; Referees: Mainville, Deschamps (CAN)
9 April 2019; 16:00	1× (yellow card) 6× (suspension)	Report	9× (suspension) 1× (red card)	Pabellon de Balomano, Santo Domingo; Referees: Mainville, Deschamps (CAN)

10 April 2019; 14:00	Mexico	26–27	Martinique	Pabellon de Balomano, Santo Domingo; Referees: Agramonte, De Jesus (DOM)
10 April 2019; 14:00	Bayardo Fernandez 10	(14–13)	Aristil 8	Pabellon de Balomano, Santo Domingo; Referees: Agramonte, De Jesus (DOM)
10 April 2019; 14:00	3× (suspension)	Report	2× (yellow card) 3× (suspension)	Pabellon de Balomano, Santo Domingo; Referees: Agramonte, De Jesus (DOM)

=== Group C ===
Pos	Team	Pld	W	D	L	GF	GA	GD	Pts	Qualification
1	Dominican Republic	2	2	0	0	112	19	+93	4	Quarterfinals
2	Haiti	2	1	0	1	47	89	−42	2	Quarterfinals
3	Saint Kitts and Nevis	2	0	0	2	40	91	−51	0	

Source: IHF
Rules for classification: 1) points; 2) head-to-head points; 3) head-to-head goal difference; 4) head-to-head number of goals scored; 5) goal difference.

8 April 2019; 20:00	Saint Kitts and Nevis	8–55	Dominican Republic	Pabellon de Balomano, Santo Domingo; Referees: Cobá, Osalde (MEX)
8 April 2019; 20:00	Francis 4	(4–27)	three players 8	Pabellon de Balomano, Santo Domingo; Referees: Cobá, Osalde (MEX)
8 April 2019; 20:00	13× (suspension) 1× (red card)	Report	1× (yellow card) 2× (suspension)	Pabellon de Balomano, Santo Domingo; Referees: Cobá, Osalde (MEX)

9 April 2019; 18:00	Haiti	36–32	Saint Kitts and Nevis	Pabellon de Balomano, Santo Domingo; Referees: Conberse, Correa (ARG)
9 April 2019; 18:00	Larmy 14	(19–11)	Francis 9	Pabellon de Balomano, Santo Domingo; Referees: Conberse, Correa (ARG)
9 April 2019; 18:00	3× (suspension)	Report	1× (yellow card) 3× (suspension)	Pabellon de Balomano, Santo Domingo; Referees: Conberse, Correa (ARG)

10 April 2019; 20:00	Dominican Republic	57–16	Haiti	Pabellon de Balomano, Santo Domingo; Referees: Kraemer, Lorenz (USA)
10 April 2019; 20:00	three players 9	(27–11)	Larmy 5	Pabellon de Balomano, Santo Domingo; Referees: Kraemer, Lorenz (USA)
10 April 2019; 20:00	1× (yellow card) 2× (suspension)	Report	7× (suspension)	Pabellon de Balomano, Santo Domingo; Referees: Kraemer, Lorenz (USA)

=== Group D ===
Pos	Team	Pld	W	D	L	GF	GA	GD	Pts	Qualification
1	United States	2	2	0	0	94	35	+59	4	Quarterfinals
2	Cuba	2	1	0	1	68	33	+35	2	Quarterfinals
3	Barbados	2	0	0	2	19	113	−94	0	

Source: IHF
Rules for classification: 1) points; 2) head-to-head points; 3) head-to-head goal difference; 4) head-to-head number of goals scored; 5) goal difference.

8 April 2019; 18:00	Barbados	12–68	United States	Pabellon de Balomano, Santo Domingo; Referees: Reyes, Zuñiga (CUB)
8 April 2019; 18:00	Henry, Evelyn-Johnson 5	(3–37)	Wheaton 12	Pabellon de Balomano, Santo Domingo; Referees: Reyes, Zuñiga (CUB)
8 April 2019; 18:00	1× (yellow card) 3× (suspension)	Report	2× (yellow card) 2× (suspension)	Pabellon de Balomano, Santo Domingo; Referees: Reyes, Zuñiga (CUB)

9 April 2019; 20:00	Cuba	45–7	Barbados	Pabellon de Balomano, Santo Domingo; Referees: Fonseca, Rodríguez (MEX)
9 April 2019; 20:00	Almeida, Rodríguez 7	(23–4)	Bartlett, Henry 2	Pabellon de Balomano, Santo Domingo; Referees: Fonseca, Rodríguez (MEX)
9 April 2019; 20:00	1× (yellow card) 2× (suspension)	Report	1× (yellow card) 3× (suspension)	Pabellon de Balomano, Santo Domingo; Referees: Fonseca, Rodríguez (MEX)

10 April 2019; 18:00	United States	26–23	Cuba	Pabellon de Balomano, Santo Domingo; Referees: Conberse, Correa (ARG)
10 April 2019; 18:00	Hines, Binderis 7	(13–10)	Taboada Dranguet 7	Pabellon de Balomano, Santo Domingo; Referees: Conberse, Correa (ARG)
10 April 2019; 18:00	3× (yellow card) 2× (suspension)	Report	1× (yellow card) 8× (suspension) 1× (red card)	Pabellon de Balomano, Santo Domingo; Referees: Conberse, Correa (ARG)

== Final Round ==
=== 9th–12th place ===
Pos	Team	Pld	W	D	L	GF	GA	GD	Pts
1	Dominica	3	3	0	0	92	75	+17	6
2	Trinidad and Tobago	3	2	0	1	94	70	+24	4
3	Saint Kitts and Nevis	3	1	0	2	91	90	+1	2
4	Barbados	3	0	0	3	79	121	−42	0

Source: IHF
Rules for classification: 1) points; 2) head-to-head points; 3) head-to-head goal difference; 4) head-to-head number of goals scored; 5) goal difference.

11 April 2019; 10:00	Dominica	31–28	Saint Kitts and Nevis	Pabellon de Balomano, Santo Domingo; Referees: Fonseca, Rodríguez (MEX)
11 April 2019; 10:00	Boland 11	(16–13)	Francis 12	Pabellon de Balomano, Santo Domingo; Referees: Fonseca, Rodríguez (MEX)
11 April 2019; 10:00	1× (yellow card) 9× (suspension) 1× (red card)	Report	3× (yellow card) 3× (suspension) 1× (red card)	Pabellon de Balomano, Santo Domingo; Referees: Fonseca, Rodríguez (MEX)

11 April 2019; 12:00	Trinidad and Tobago	44–23	Barbados	Pabellon de Balomano, Santo Domingo; Referees: Coba, Osalde (MEX)
11 April 2019; 12:00	Biggart 14	(21–15)	Evelyn-Johnson 8	Pabellon de Balomano, Santo Domingo; Referees: Coba, Osalde (MEX)
11 April 2019; 12:00	1× (yellow card) 2× (suspension)	Report	1× (yellow card) 6× (suspension) 1× (red card)	Pabellon de Balomano, Santo Domingo; Referees: Coba, Osalde (MEX)

13 April 2019; 10:00	Barbados	30–39	Dominica	Pabellon de Balomano, Santo Domingo; Referees: Caatellanos, Céspedes (CUB)
13 April 2019; 10:00	Evelyn-Johnson 8	(16–21)	Sebastien 11	Pabellon de Balomano, Santo Domingo; Referees: Caatellanos, Céspedes (CUB)
13 April 2019; 10:00	2× (yellow card) 2× (suspension) 1× (red card)	Report	1× (yellow card) 4× (suspension)	Pabellon de Balomano, Santo Domingo; Referees: Caatellanos, Céspedes (CUB)

13 April 2019; 12:00	Saint Kitts and Nevis	25–33	Trinidad and Tobago	Pabellon de Balomano, Santo Domingo; Referees: Fonseca, Rodríguez (MEX)
13 April 2019; 12:00		(12–19)		Pabellon de Balomano, Santo Domingo; Referees: Fonseca, Rodríguez (MEX)
13 April 2019; 12:00	2× (yellow card) 11× (suspension) 2× (red card)	Report	10× (suspension)	Pabellon de Balomano, Santo Domingo; Referees: Fonseca, Rodríguez (MEX)

14 April 2019; 10:00	Dominica	22–17	Trinidad and Tobago	Pabellon de Balomano, Santo Domingo; Referees: Agramonte, De Jesus (DOM)
14 April 2019; 10:00		(9–4)		Pabellon de Balomano, Santo Domingo; Referees: Agramonte, De Jesus (DOM)
14 April 2019; 10:00	1× (yellow card) 2× (suspension) 1× (red card)	Report	1× (yellow card) 1× (suspension)	Pabellon de Balomano, Santo Domingo; Referees: Agramonte, De Jesus (DOM)

14 April 2019; 12:00	Saint Kitts and Nevis	38–26	Barbados	Pabellon de Balomano, Santo Domingo; Referees: Mainville, Deschamps (CAN)
14 April 2019; 12:00		Report		Pabellon de Balomano, Santo Domingo; Referees: Mainville, Deschamps (CAN)

=== Championship bracket ===
Fifth place
Martinique	26
Mexico	27
Seventh place
Haiti	16
Canada	56

5–8th place semifinals
Haiti	17
Martinique	48
Canada	23
Mexico	27

Quarterfinals
Puerto Rico	41
Haiti	19
Martinique	16
Cuba	32
Canada	16
Dominican Republic	28
Mexico	25
United States	35

Semifinals
Puerto Rico	23
Cuba	27
Dominican Republic	39
United States	41

Final
Cuba	37
United States	36
Third place
Puerto Rico	39
Dominican Republic	40

==== Quarterfinals ====
11 April 2019; 14:00	Puerto Rico	41–19	Haiti	Pabellon de Balomano, Santo Domingo; Referees: Deschamps, Mainville (CAN)
11 April 2019; 14:00	Monge Carballo, Saunders Ferrer 10	(23–7)	Salgado 5	Pabellon de Balomano, Santo Domingo; Referees: Deschamps, Mainville (CAN)
11 April 2019; 14:00	1× (yellow card) 2× (suspension)	Report	1× (yellow card) 7× (suspension)	Pabellon de Balomano, Santo Domingo; Referees: Deschamps, Mainville (CAN)

11 April 2019; 16:00	Martinique	16–32	Cuba	Pabellon de Balomano, Santo Domingo; Referees: Araujo, Perdomo (URU)
11 April 2019; 16:00	Marsillon 7	(8–16)	Toldeano Salazar 9	Pabellon de Balomano, Santo Domingo; Referees: Araujo, Perdomo (URU)
11 April 2019; 16:00	1× (yellow card) 5× (suspension) 1× (red card)	Report	8× (suspension) 1× (red card)	Pabellon de Balomano, Santo Domingo; Referees: Araujo, Perdomo (URU)

11 April 2019; 18:00	Canada	16–28	Dominican Republic	Pabellon de Balomano, Santo Domingo; Referees: Conberse, Correa (ARG)
11 April 2019; 18:00	Dupere 7	(3–14)	Tejeda 6	Pabellon de Balomano, Santo Domingo; Referees: Conberse, Correa (ARG)
11 April 2019; 18:00	2× (yellow card) 4× (suspension)	Report	2× (yellow card) 4× (suspension)	Pabellon de Balomano, Santo Domingo; Referees: Conberse, Correa (ARG)

11 April 2019; 20:00	Mexico	25–35	United States	Pabellon de Balomano, Santo Domingo; Referees: Reyes, Zuñiga (CUB)
11 April 2019; 20:00	Morales Diaz 6	(7–14)	Binderis 6	Pabellon de Balomano, Santo Domingo; Referees: Reyes, Zuñiga (CUB)
11 April 2019; 20:00	1× (yellow card) 3× (suspension)	Report	1× (yellow card) 7× (suspension)	Pabellon de Balomano, Santo Domingo; Referees: Reyes, Zuñiga (CUB)

==== 5–8th place semifinals ====
13 April 2019; 14:00	Haiti	17–48	Martinique	Pabellon de Balomano, Santo Domingo; Referees: Coba, Osalde (MEX)
13 April 2019; 14:00		(8–25)		Pabellon de Balomano, Santo Domingo; Referees: Coba, Osalde (MEX)
13 April 2019; 14:00	1× (yellow card) 4× (suspension) 2× (red card)	Report	1× (yellow card) 3× (suspension) 1× (red card)	Pabellon de Balomano, Santo Domingo; Referees: Coba, Osalde (MEX)

13 April 2019; 16:00	Canada	23–27	Mexico	Pabellon de Balomano, Santo Domingo; Referees: Araujo, Perdomo (URU)
13 April 2019; 16:00	Dupere 5	(11–13)	Morales Diaz 6	Pabellon de Balomano, Santo Domingo; Referees: Araujo, Perdomo (URU)
13 April 2019; 16:00	4× (suspension)	Report	1× (yellow card) 2× (suspension)	Pabellon de Balomano, Santo Domingo; Referees: Araujo, Perdomo (URU)

==== Semifinals ====
13 April 2019; 18:00	Puerto Rico	23–27	Cuba	Pabellon de Balomano, Santo Domingo; Referees: Agramonte, De Jesus (DOM)
13 April 2019; 18:00	Hiraldo Cepeda 8	(8–18)	Toledano Salazar 6	Pabellon de Balomano, Santo Domingo; Referees: Agramonte, De Jesus (DOM)
13 April 2019; 18:00	1× (yellow card) 2× (suspension)	Report	1× (yellow card) 9× (suspension) 1× (red card)	Pabellon de Balomano, Santo Domingo; Referees: Agramonte, De Jesus (DOM)

13 April 2019
20:00
Dominican Republic
39-41 (ET)
United States
Pabellon de Balomano, Santo Domingo
Referees: Conberse, Correa (ARG)
Tejeda 12
(16–14)
Hines 17
1× (yellow card) 4× (suspension) 1× (red card)
Report
4× (suspension)

FT: 29–29 ET: 5–5, 5–7

==== Seventh place game ====
14 April 2019; 14:00	Haiti	16–56	Canada	Pabellon de Balomano, Santo Domingo; Referees: Kraemer, Lorenz (USA)
14 April 2019; 14:00	Salgado 6	(9–32)	Dupere 14	Pabellon de Balomano, Santo Domingo; Referees: Kraemer, Lorenz (USA)
14 April 2019; 14:00	1× (yellow card) 6× (suspension)	Report		Pabellon de Balomano, Santo Domingo; Referees: Kraemer, Lorenz (USA)

==== Fifth place game ====
14 April 2019; 16:00	Martinique	26–27	Mexico	Pabellon de Balomano, Santo Domingo; Referees: Araujo, Perdomo (URU)
14 April 2019; 16:00	Tramma 8	(10–15)	Morales Diaz 8	Pabellon de Balomano, Santo Domingo; Referees: Araujo, Perdomo (URU)
14 April 2019; 16:00	2× (suspension)	Report	4× (suspension)	Pabellon de Balomano, Santo Domingo; Referees: Araujo, Perdomo (URU)

==== Third place game ====
14 April 2019
18:00
Puerto Rico
39–40 (ET)
Dominican Republic
Pabellon de Balomano, Santo Domingo
Referees: Reyes, Zuñiga (CUB)
Nazario Santiago 11
(13–15)
Tejeda 10
2× (yellow card) 2× (suspension)
Report
2× (yellow card) 6× (suspension)

FT: 31–31 ET: 5–5, 3–4

==== Final ====
14 April 2019
20:00
Cuba
37–36 (ET)
United States
Pabellon de Balomano, Santo Domingo
Referees: Conberse, Correa (ARG)
Toledano Salazar, Taboada Dranguet 12
(21–17)
Hines 7
1× (yellow card) 5× (suspension)
Report
2× (yellow card) 2× (suspension)

FT: 33–33 ET: 4–3

== Final standings ==
Rank	Team
Gold medal	Cuba
Silver medal	United States
Bronze medal	Dominican Republic
4	Puerto Rico
5	Mexico
6	Martinique
7	Canada
8	Haiti
9	Dominica
10	Trinidad and Tobago
11	Saint Kitts and Nevis
12	Barbados
