= Mexican Handball Federation =

Governing body of handball in Mexico

Mexican Handball Federation Spanish: Federación Mexicana de Handball FMHB
- IOC nation: Mexico (MEX)
- Sport: Handball
- Other sports: Beach handball; Wheelchair handball

AFFILIATIONS
- International federation: International Handball Federation (IHF)
- IHF member since: 1970
- Continental association: North America and Caribbean Handball Confederation
- National Olympic Committee: Mexican Olympic Committee

GOVERNING BODY
- President: Mario García de la Torre

HEADQUARTERS
- Address: Aguascalientes 187 Col., Hipodromo-Condesa, 06100 Mexico City
- Country: Mexico
- Secretary General: Marco De Anda Herrera

The Mexican Handball Federation (FMHB; Spanish: Federación Mexicana de Handball) is the administrative and controlling body for handball and beach handball in Mexico. FMHB is a member of the North America and Caribbean Handball Confederation (NACHC) and member of the International Handball Federation (IHF) since 1970.

== National teams ==
- Mexico men's national handball team
- Mexico men's national junior handball team
- Mexico women's national handball team
- Mexico national beach handball team
- Mexico women's national beach handball team

== Competitions hosted ==
- 1980 Pan American Men's Handball Championship
- 2011 Pan American Games
- 2014 Nor.Ca. Men's Handball Championship
- 2018 Nor.Ca. Men's Handball Championship
- 2019 Nor.Ca. Women's Handball Championship
