= Canada men's national handball team =

Canada

Information
- Association: Canadian Team Handball Federation
- Coach: Christian Latulippe

Colours
1st	2nd	3rd

Results

Summer Olympics
- Appearances: 1 (First in 1976)
- Best result: 11th (1976)

World Championship
- Appearances: 3 (First in 1967)
- Best result: 15th (1978)

Pan American Championship
- Appearances: 11 (First in 1980)
- Best result: (silver) 2nd (1980)
- Last updated on Unknown.

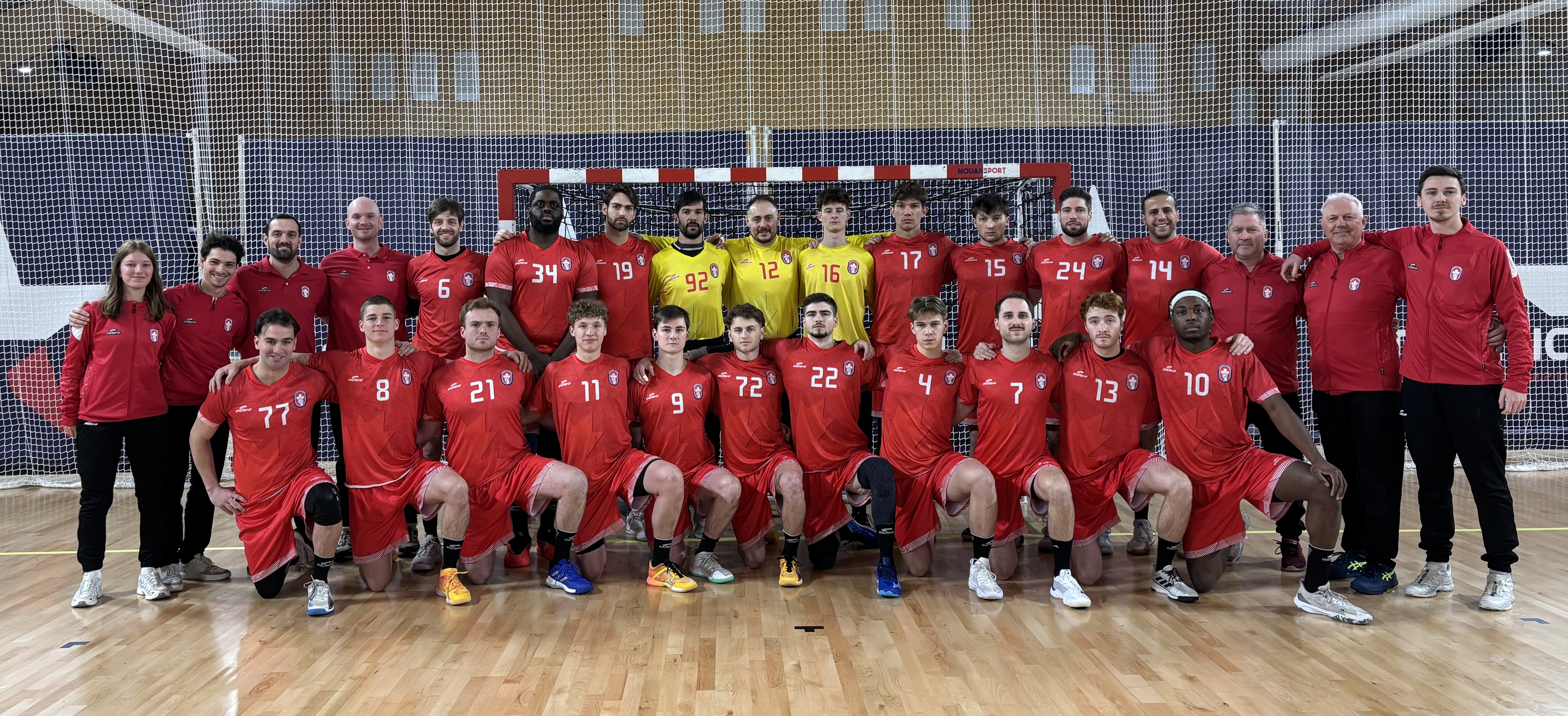
The Canadian Men's Handball Team in Eaubonne, France, January 2025.

The Canada men's national handball team is controlled by the Canadian Team Handball Federation. The Canadian Men's Team has historically consisted mainly of players from Alberta and Quebec, but has featured players from Manitoba, Saskatchewan and Ontario.

The team participated in the 2005 World Men's Handball Championship as well as the 2011 Men's Junior World Handball Championship

== Tournament records ==
Olympics Games
Year	Round	Rank	GM	W	D	L	GF	GA	GD
(Germany) 1972	did not qualify								
(Canada) 1976	Group stage	11	5	0	0	5	75	122	−47
from 1980 to 2024	did not qualify								
Total	1/14	0/1	5	0	0	5	75	122	-47

World Championship
Year	Round	Rank	GM	W	D	L	GF	GA	GD
(Germany) 1938	did not enter								
from 1954 to 1964	did not qualify								
(Sweden) 1967	1st round	16	3	0	0	3	18	92	−74
(France) 1970	did not qualify								
(East Germany) 1974	did not qualify								
(Denmark) 1978	1st round	15	3	0	0	3	31	73	−42
from 1982 to 2003	did not qualify								
(Tunisia) 2005	1st round	23	5	0	0	5	103	201	−98
from 2007 to 2027	did not qualify								
Total	3/29	0/3	11	0	0	11	152	366	-214

https://commons.wikimedia.org/wiki/File:PanAM1984V1.png

Pan American Championship
Year	Round	Rank	GM	W	D	L	GF	GA	GD
(Mexico) 1980	Single round	2nd place, silver medalist(s)	5	3	1	1	98	90	+8
(Argentina) 1981	did not qualify								
(United States) 1983	Single round	3rd place, bronze medalist(s)	5	3	0	2	113	98	+15
(Brazil) 1985	Single round	6	5	0	1	4	86	126	−40
(Cuba) 1989	Single round	4	5	2	0	3	133	111	+22
(Brazil) 1994	did not qualify								
(United States) 1996	1st round	5	5	3	0	2	125	98	+27
(Cuba) 1998	Quarter-final	6	7	3	0	4	160	177	−17
(Brazil) 2000	did not qualify								
(Argentina) 2002	did not qualify								
(Chile) 2004	Semi-final	3rd place, bronze medalist(s)	5	3	0	2	120	117	+3
(Brazil) 2006	did not qualify								
(Brazil) 2008	1st round	7	4	0	1	3	79	97	−18
(Chile) 2010	1st round	7	5	1	0	4	135	167	−32
(Argentina) 2012	did not qualify								
(Uruguay) 2014	did not qualify								
(Argentina) 2016	1st round	10–11	5	1	0	4	101	182	−81
(Greenland) 2018	1st round	5	7	4	0	3	191	214	−23
Total	11/18	0/11	58	23	3	32	1341	1477	-136

Pan American Games
Year	Round	Rank	GM	W	D	L	GF	GA	GD
(United States) 1987	3rd place final	4	5	1	0	4	109	131	−22
(Cuba) 1991	3rd place final	4	5	1	0	4	103	132	−29
(Argentina) 1995	did not qualify								
(Canada) 1999	1st round	5	5	3	0	2	115	111	+4
(Dominican Republic) 2003	did not qualify								
(Brazil) 2007	1st round	7	5	1	0	4	113	153	−40
(Mexico) 2011	1st round	5	5	3	0	2	122	161	−39
(Canada) 2015	1st round	7	5	2	0	3	112	137	−25
(Peru) 2019	did not qualify								
(Chile) 2023	did not qualify								
Total	6/10	0/6	30	11	0	19	674	825	-151

North American and Caribbean Championship
Year	Round	Rank	GM	W	D	L	GF	GA	GD
(Mexico) 2014	did not qualify								
(Mexico) 2018	Single group	2nd place, silver medalist(s)	5	3	1	1	136	132	+4
(Mexico) 2020	Cancelled due to the Covid-19 pandemic								
(Mexico) 2022	did not qualify								
(Mexico) 2024	5th place final	5	6	1	0	5	152	181	−29
(United States) 2026	Bronze medal game	4	4	1	0	3	77	116	−29
Total	3/5		15	5	1	9	365	429	-54

== Current squad ==
Name	Position	Club
Gregory Allard	Center Back	Levis
Nektarios Antoniadis	Left Wing	AESH Pylaia
Theodoros Antoniadis	Left Wing	AESH Pylaia
Daniel Arguillas Alvarez	Goalkeeper	Bada Huesca
Jamal Bayade	Pivot	Rosemont
Nathan Belanger	Center Back	Champlain
Naël Bisou	Goalkeeper	Levis
Pierre-Alexandre Coin	Right Wing	Melantois
Justin Danulet	Goalkeeper	AESH Pylaia
Antoine Desbiens	Right Back	Champlain
Eric Duppré	Left Wing	Celtique de Montréal
Kevin Emeu	Pivot	Celtique de Montréal
Mitchel Fodor	Left Back	Calgary
Cazy de Dudley Gaspard	Right Back	Celtique de Montréal
Rhys Kleinmann	Left Back	Edmonton
Colton Kuypers	Left Back	Elitesport Vendsyssel
Simon Lefebvre-Gagnon	Center Back	Objat
Andréas Louis	Center Back	Celtique de Montréal
Axel Mesurolle	Right Wing	Rezé
Jason Miller	Pivot	Toronto
Jacob O'Shea	Right Wing	HEI Skaering

== Key players ==
(Canada) Alexis Bertrand : player

(Canada) Justin Larouche : player
