= Pan American Men's Handball Championship =

International handball competition

- Sport: Handball
- Founded: 1980
- First season: 1980
- Folded: 2018
- Replaced by: South and Central American Championship and North America and Caribbean Championship
- No. of teams: 12
- Continent: PATHF (Americas)
- Most titles: Cuba (8 titles)

The Pan American Men's Handball Championship, also called PanAmericano, was the official competition for senior national handball teams of North, Central, and South America and the Caribbean. It took place every two years and was organized by the Pan-American Team Handball Federation. In addition to crowning the Pan-American champions, the tournament also served as a qualifying tournament for the IHF World Men's Handball Championship. In 2018, the PATHF was folded and the tournament was replaced with the South and Central American Championship and North America and Caribbean Championship.

== Summary ==
Year	Host	Final			Third place match			Teams
Year	Host	Champions	Score	Runners-up	Third place	Score	Fourth place	Teams
1980; Details	Mexico City	Cuba	Round-robin	Canada	United States	Round-robin	Brazil	6
1981; Details	(Argentina); Buenos Aires	Cuba	34–20	Brazil	United States	25–22	Argentina	7
1983; Details	(United States); Colorado Springs	Cuba	Round-robin	United States	Canada	Round-robin	Brazil	6
1985; Details	(Brazil); Manaus	Cuba	Round-robin	United States	Brazil	Round-robin	Mexico	6
1989; Details	(Cuba); Pinar del Río	Cuba	Round-robin	Brazil	United States	Round-robin	Canada	6
1994; Details	(Brazil); Santa Maria	Cuba	Round-robin	Brazil	United States	Round-robin	Argentina	7
1996; Details	(United States); Colorado Springs	Cuba	28–24	Argentina	United States	23–22	Brazil	8
1998; Details	(Cuba); Havana	Cuba	31–26	Argentina	Brazil	27–22	United States	9
2000; Details	(Brazil); São Bernardo do Campo	Argentina	26–25	Cuba	Brazil	38–17	United States	8
2002; Details	(Argentina); Buenos Aires	Argentina	22–21	Brazil	Greenland	27–7	United States	8
2004; Details	(Chile); Santiago	Argentina	24–21	Brazil	Canada	31–24	Chile	8
2006; Details	(Brazil); Aracaju	Brazil	28–23	Argentina	Greenland	30–29	United States	8
2008; Details	(Brazil); São Carlos	Brazil	27–24	Argentina	Cuba	37–30	Chile	7
2010; Details	(Chile); Santiago	Argentina	28–27	Brazil	Chile	34–31	Cuba	8
2012; Details	(Argentina); Burzaco	Argentina	22–21	Brazil	Chile	37–27	Uruguay	9
2014; Details	(Uruguay); Canelones	Argentina	30–19	Brazil	Chile	25–24	Uruguay	8
2016; Details	(Argentina); Buenos Aires	Brazil	28–24	Chile	Argentina	29–13	Uruguay	12
2018; Details	(Greenland); Nuuk	Argentina	29–24	Brazil	Chile	39–36 (OT)	Greenland	11

== Medal table ==
Rank	Nation	Gold	Silver	Bronze	Total
1	Cuba	8	1	1	10
2	Argentina	7	4	1	12
3	Brazil	3	9	3	15
4	United States	0	2	5	7
5	Chile	0	1	4	5
6	Canada	0	1	2	3
7	Greenland	0	0	2	2
Totals (7 entries)		18	18	18	54

== Participating nations ==
Nation	(Mexico) 1980	(Argentina) 1981	(United States) 1983	(Brazil) 1985	(Cuba) 1989	(Brazil) 1994	(United States) 1996	(Cuba) 1998	(Brazil) 2000	(Argentina) 2002	(Chile) 2004	(Brazil) 2006	(Brazil) 2008	(Chile) 2010	(Argentina) 2012	(Uruguay) 2014	(Argentina) 2016	(Greenland) 2018	Years
Argentina	5th	4th	-	5th	-	4th	2nd	2nd	1st	1st	1st	2nd	2nd	1st	1st	1st	3rd	1st	16
Brazil	4th	2nd	4th	3rd	2nd	2nd	4th	3rd	3rd	2nd	2nd	1st	1st	2nd	2nd	2nd	1st	2nd	18
Canada	2nd	-	3rd	6th	4th	-	5th	6th	-		3rd	-	7th	7th	-	-	10th	5th	11
Chile	-	7th	-	-	-	-	-	-	-	5th	4th	5th	4th	3rd	3rd	3rd	2nd	3rd	10
Colombia	-	-	-	-	-	-	-	8th	-	8th	-	-	-	-	-	-	9th	9th	4
Costa Rica	-	-	-	-	-	-	8th	-	-	-	-	-	-	-	-	-	-	-	1
Cuba	1st	1st	1st	1st	1st	1st	1st	1st	2nd	-	-	-	3rd	4th	-	-	-	-	11
Dominican Republic	-	-	-	-	-	-	-	-	6th	-	-	-	-	8th	-	-	-	-	2
Greenland	-	-	-	-	-	-	-	5th	5th	3rd	5th	3rd	5th	6th	5th	5th	5th	4th	11
Guatemala	-	-	-	-	-	-	-	-	-	-	-	-	-	-	-	8th	11th	8th	3
Mexico	6th	5th	5th	4th	5th	5th	6th	7th	7th	7th	8th	7th	-	-	9th	7th	7th	-	15
Paraguay	-	6th	-	-	-	6th	-	-	-	6th	-	-	-	-	6th	-	12th	11th	6
Peru	-	-	-	-	-	-	-	-	-	-	-	-	-	-	-	-	-	10th	1
Puerto Rico	-	-	6th	-	6th	-	7th	-	-	-	6th	8th	-	-	-	-	6th	7th	7
Uruguay	-	-	-	-	-	7th	-	9th	8th	-	-	6th	6th	5th	4th	4th	4th	6th	10
United States	3rd	3rd	2nd	2nd	3rd	3rd	3rd	4th	4th	4th	7th	4th	-	-	7th	6th	8th	-	15
Venezuela	-	-	-	-	-	-	-	-	-	-	-	-	-	-	8th	-	-	-	1
Total	6	7	6	6	6	7	8	9	8	8	8	8	7	8	9	8	12	11	
