= 2018 Pan American Men's Handball Championship =

Tournament details
- Host country: Greenland
- Venue(s): 1 (in 1 host city)
- Dates: 16–24 June
- Teams: 11 (from 1 confederation)

Final positions
- Champions: Argentina (7th title)
- Runner-up: Brazil
- Third place: Chile
- Fourth place: Greenland

Tournament statistics
- Matches played: 34
- Goals scored: 1,874 (55.12 per match)
- Top scorer(s): (Brazil) Fábio Chiuffa (45 goals)

Awards
- Best player: (Brazil) Henrique Teixeira

The 2018 Pan American Men's Handball Championship was the 18th official competition for senior men's national handball teams of North, Central and South America and the Caribbean. It was held from 16 to 24 June 2018 in Nuuk, Greenland. It also acted as the qualifying competition for the 2019 World Men's Handball Championship in Denmark and Germany, securing three vacancies for the World Championship.

Argentina won the tournament for the seventh time after defeating Brazil 29–24 in the final.

== Venue ==
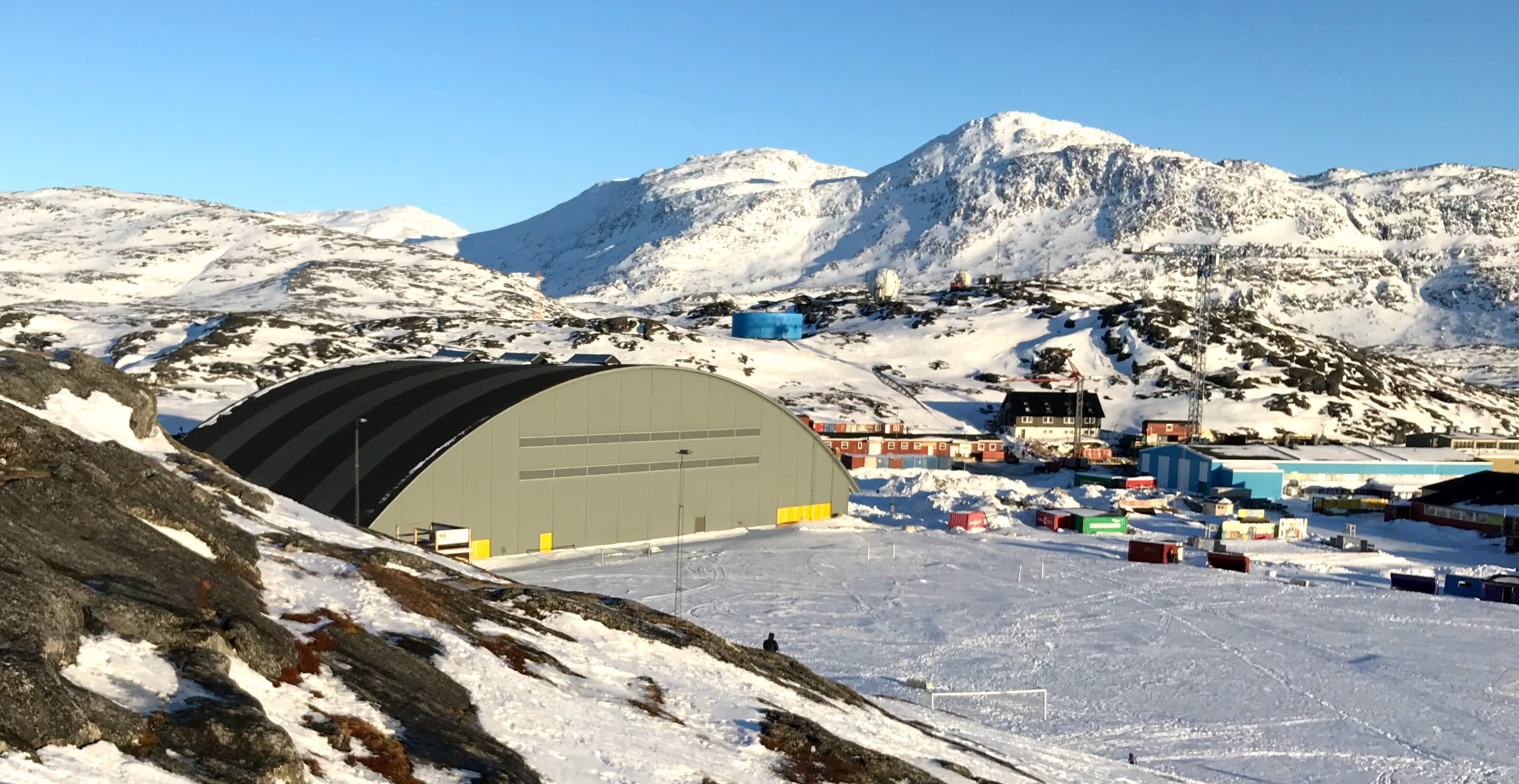
Inussivik, the Sports Arena in Nuuk, Greenland, March 2018.

Nuuk	Nuuk is located in Greenland
Inussivik	Nuuk is located in Greenland
Capacity: 2,150	Nuuk is located in Greenland

== Qualification ==
Qualification	Vacancies	Qualified
Host	1	Greenland
Automatic qualifiers	3	Argentina; Brazil; Chile
Central American Games	1	Guatemala
South Zone	4	Colombia; Paraguay; Peru; Uruguay
Nor.Ca. Championship	3	Canada; ~~Cuba~~; Puerto Rico

Cuba withdrew before the tournament.

== Draw ==
The draw was held on 14 April 2018 at Buenos Aires, Argentina.

=== Seeding ===
Pot 1	Pot 2	Pot 3	Pot 4	Pot 5	Pot 6
Brazil; Chile	Argentina; Uruguay	Greenland; ~~Cuba~~	Canada; Puerto Rico	Colombia; Guatemala	Paraguay; Peru

== Preliminary round ==
All times are local (UTC−2).

=== Group A ===
Pos	Team	Pld	W	D	L	GF	GA	GD	Pts	Qualification
1	Argentina	4	4	0	0	168	54	+114	8	Semifinals
2	Chile	4	3	0	1	126	77	+49	6	Semifinals
3	Puerto Rico	4	2	0	2	106	121	−15	4	5–8th place semifinals
4	Guatemala	4	1	0	3	76	151	−75	2	5–8th place semifinals
5	Peru	4	0	0	4	72	145	−73	0	9th place game
6	Cuba	0	0	0	0	0	0	0	0	Withdrawn

Source: Panamhandball
Rules for classification: 1) Points; 2) Head-to-head points; 3) Head-to-head goal difference; 4) Head-to-head goals scored; 5) Goal difference; 6) Goals scored; 7) Draw.

16 June 2018; 14:00	Argentina	48–8	Peru	Inussivik, Nuuk; Attendance: 344; Referees: Alaufsen, Sørensen (GRL)
16 June 2018; 14:00	I. Pizarro 13	(24–4)	Gutelius 3	Inussivik, Nuuk; Attendance: 344; Referees: Alaufsen, Sørensen (GRL)
16 June 2018; 14:00	2× (yellow card) 2× (suspension)	Report	1× (suspension)	Inussivik, Nuuk; Attendance: 344; Referees: Alaufsen, Sørensen (GRL)

16 June 2018; 18:00	Chile	33–26	Puerto Rico	Inussivik, Nuuk; Attendance: 600; Referees: Sosa, Lemes (URU)
16 June 2018; 18:00	R. Salinas 8	(18–14)	Nazario 9	Inussivik, Nuuk; Attendance: 600; Referees: Sosa, Lemes (URU)
16 June 2018; 18:00	1× (yellow card) 4× (suspension)	Report	4× (suspension) 1× (red card)	Inussivik, Nuuk; Attendance: 600; Referees: Sosa, Lemes (URU)

17 June 2018; 14:00	Puerto Rico	18–42	Argentina	Inussivik, Nuuk; Attendance: 230; Referees: Rocha, Magalhães (BRA)
17 June 2018; 14:00	Hiraldo 6	(11–23)	I. Pizarro 7	Inussivik, Nuuk; Attendance: 230; Referees: Rocha, Magalhães (BRA)
17 June 2018; 14:00	1× (yellow card) 3× (suspension)	Report	2× (yellow card) 4× (suspension)	Inussivik, Nuuk; Attendance: 230; Referees: Rocha, Magalhães (BRA)

17 June 2018; 18:00	Guatemala	14–39	Chile	Inussivik, Nuuk; Attendance: 200; Referees: López, Lenci (ARG)
17 June 2018; 18:00	Herrera 6	(7–17)	Ayala 7	Inussivik, Nuuk; Attendance: 200; Referees: López, Lenci (ARG)
17 June 2018; 18:00	1× (yellow card) 2× (suspension)	Report	1× (yellow card) 4× (suspension)	Inussivik, Nuuk; Attendance: 200; Referees: López, Lenci (ARG)

18 June 2018; 14:00	Puerto Rico	32–21	Guatemala	Inussivik, Nuuk; Attendance: 130; Referees: Meneses, Pinto (BRA)
18 June 2018; 14:00	Gutiérrez, Nazario 8	(14–10)	Herrera 8	Inussivik, Nuuk; Attendance: 130; Referees: Meneses, Pinto (BRA)
18 June 2018; 14:00	2× (yellow card) 6× (suspension)	Report	1× (yellow card) 1× (suspension)	Inussivik, Nuuk; Attendance: 130; Referees: Meneses, Pinto (BRA)

18 June 2018; 18:00	Chile	36–13	Peru	Inussivik, Nuuk; Attendance: 290; Referees: Rocha, Magalhães (BRA)
18 June 2018; 18:00	Feuchtmann 7	(18–6)	Vélez 4	Inussivik, Nuuk; Attendance: 290; Referees: Rocha, Magalhães (BRA)
18 June 2018; 18:00	2× (yellow card) 6× (suspension)	Report	1× (suspension)	Inussivik, Nuuk; Attendance: 290; Referees: Rocha, Magalhães (BRA)

20 June 2018; 10:00	Argentina	54–10	Guatemala	Inussivik, Nuuk; Attendance: 100; Referees: Meneses, Pinto (BRA)
20 June 2018; 10:00	F. Pizarro 13	(29–4)	García 3	Inussivik, Nuuk; Attendance: 100; Referees: Meneses, Pinto (BRA)
20 June 2018; 10:00	2× (yellow card)	Report	2× (suspension)	Inussivik, Nuuk; Attendance: 100; Referees: Meneses, Pinto (BRA)

20 June 2018; 14:00	Peru	25–30	Puerto Rico	Inussivik, Nuuk; Referees: Alaufsen, Sørensen (GRL)
20 June 2018; 14:00	Camborda, López 5	(13–16)	Hiraldo 6	Inussivik, Nuuk; Referees: Alaufsen, Sørensen (GRL)
20 June 2018; 14:00	3× (yellow card) 2× (suspension)	Report	2× (yellow card) 3× (suspension)	Inussivik, Nuuk; Referees: Alaufsen, Sørensen (GRL)

21 June 2018; 10:00	Guatemala	31–26	Peru	Inussivik, Nuuk; Attendance: 90; Referees: Rocha, Magalhães (URU)
21 June 2018; 10:00	Martínez, M. Morales 10	(16–10)	Gutelius 7	Inussivik, Nuuk; Attendance: 90; Referees: Rocha, Magalhães (URU)
21 June 2018; 10:00	1× (yellow card) 4× (suspension)	Report	4× (yellow card) 5× (suspension)	Inussivik, Nuuk; Attendance: 90; Referees: Rocha, Magalhães (URU)

21 June 2018; 18:00	Chile	18–24	Argentina	Inussivik, Nuuk; Attendance: 1,760; Referees: Lah, Sok (SLO)
21 June 2018; 18:00	Feuchtmann 8	(9–10)	F. Fernández 7	Inussivik, Nuuk; Attendance: 1,760; Referees: Lah, Sok (SLO)
21 June 2018; 18:00	4× (yellow card) 4× (suspension)	Report	3× (yellow card) 7× (suspension)	Inussivik, Nuuk; Attendance: 1,760; Referees: Lah, Sok (SLO)

=== Group B ===
Pos	Team	Pld	W	D	L	GF	GA	GD	Pts	Qualification
1	Brazil	5	5	0	0	195	96	+99	10	Semifinals
2	Greenland (H)	5	4	0	1	159	131	+28	8	Semifinals
3	Uruguay	5	3	0	2	136	137	−1	6	5–8th place semifinals
4	Canada	5	2	0	3	107	145	−38	4	5–8th place semifinals
5	Colombia	5	1	0	4	116	150	−34	2	9th place game
6	Paraguay	5	0	0	5	104	158	−54	0	

Source: Panamhandball
Rules for classification: 1) Points; 2) Head-to-head points; 3) Head-to-head goal difference; 4) Head-to-head goals scored; 5) Goal difference; 6) Goals scored; 7) Draw.
(H) Hosts

16 June 2018; 12:00	Uruguay	34–25	Paraguay	Inussivik, Nuuk; Attendance: 222; Referees: López, Lenci (ARG)
16 June 2018; 12:00	Fabra 8	(18–12)	Mendoza 6	Inussivik, Nuuk; Attendance: 222; Referees: López, Lenci (ARG)
16 June 2018; 12:00	2× (suspension)	Report	2× (yellow card) 4× (suspension)	Inussivik, Nuuk; Attendance: 222; Referees: López, Lenci (ARG)

16 June 2018; 16:00	Brazil	42–13	Canada	Inussivik, Nuuk; Attendance: 289; Referees: Gubica, Milošević (CRO)
16 June 2018; 16:00	Chiuffa 8	(21–6)	Mercier, Touzel 3	Inussivik, Nuuk; Attendance: 289; Referees: Gubica, Milošević (CRO)
16 June 2018; 16:00	3× (yellow card)	Report	2× (yellow card) 2× (suspension)	Inussivik, Nuuk; Attendance: 289; Referees: Gubica, Milošević (CRO)

16 June 2018; 20:30	Greenland	35–24	Colombia	Inussivik, Nuuk; Attendance: 1,900; Referees: Lah, Sok (SLO)
16 June 2018; 20:30	Høegh, Ak. Kreutzmann 6	(18–11)	S. Restrepo 9	Inussivik, Nuuk; Attendance: 1,900; Referees: Lah, Sok (SLO)
16 June 2018; 20:30	3× (yellow card) 6× (suspension)	Report	2× (yellow card) 4× (suspension) 1× (red card)	Inussivik, Nuuk; Attendance: 1,900; Referees: Lah, Sok (SLO)

17 June 2018; 12:00	Canada	24–26	Uruguay	Inussivik, Nuuk; Attendance: 100; Referees: Lah, Sok (SLO)
17 June 2018; 12:00	Fischer 6	(8–14)	Rostagno 6	Inussivik, Nuuk; Attendance: 100; Referees: Lah, Sok (SLO)
17 June 2018; 12:00	2× (yellow card) 4× (suspension)	Report	2× (yellow card) 4× (suspension)	Inussivik, Nuuk; Attendance: 100; Referees: Lah, Sok (SLO)

17 June 2018; 16:00	Colombia	22–42	Brazil	Inussivik, Nuuk; Attendance: 247; Referees: Sosa, Lemes (URU)
17 June 2018; 16:00	S. Restrepo 9	(11–18)	Borges 7	Inussivik, Nuuk; Attendance: 247; Referees: Sosa, Lemes (URU)
17 June 2018; 16:00	6× (suspension)	Report	1× (yellow card) 5× (suspension)	Inussivik, Nuuk; Attendance: 247; Referees: Sosa, Lemes (URU)

17 June 2018; 20:00	Paraguay	22–35	Greenland	Inussivik, Nuuk; Attendance: 933; Referees: Menezes, Pinto (BRA)
17 June 2018; 20:00	Melgarejo 6	(13–17)	Heilmann 7	Inussivik, Nuuk; Attendance: 933; Referees: Menezes, Pinto (BRA)
17 June 2018; 20:00	1× (yellow card) 4× (suspension) 1× (red card)	Report	3× (yellow card) 3× (suspension)	Inussivik, Nuuk; Attendance: 933; Referees: Menezes, Pinto (BRA)

18 June 2018; 12:00	Canada	25–24	Colombia	Inussivik, Nuuk; Attendance: 120; Referees: López, Lenci (ARG)
18 June 2018; 12:00	Mercier 8	(11–11)	Mayo 11	Inussivik, Nuuk; Attendance: 120; Referees: López, Lenci (ARG)
18 June 2018; 12:00	2× (yellow card) 8× (suspension)	Report	2× (yellow card) 8× (suspension)	Inussivik, Nuuk; Attendance: 120; Referees: López, Lenci (ARG)

18 June 2018; 16:00	Brazil	40–14	Paraguay	Inussivik, Nuuk; Attendance: 140; Referees: Sosa, Lemes (URU)
18 June 2018; 16:00	Chiuffa 9	(18–6)	Mendoza 4	Inussivik, Nuuk; Attendance: 140; Referees: Sosa, Lemes (URU)
18 June 2018; 16:00	3× (yellow card) 4× (suspension)	Report	1× (yellow card) 1× (suspension) 1× (red card)	Inussivik, Nuuk; Attendance: 140; Referees: Sosa, Lemes (URU)

18 June 2018; 20:00	Uruguay	29–31	Greenland	Inussivik, Nuuk; Attendance: 1,920; Referees: Gubica, Milošević (CRO)
18 June 2018; 20:00	Fabra 6	(14–17)	Høegh 7	Inussivik, Nuuk; Attendance: 1,920; Referees: Gubica, Milošević (CRO)
18 June 2018; 20:00	1× (yellow card) 3× (suspension)	Report	2× (yellow card) 7× (suspension) 1× (red card)	Inussivik, Nuuk; Attendance: 1,920; Referees: Gubica, Milošević (CRO)

20 June 2018; 12:00	Paraguay	21–25	Canada	Inussivik, Nuuk; Attendance: 200; Referees: López, Lenci (ARG)
20 June 2018; 12:00	V. Pérez 5	(9–12)	three players 4	Inussivik, Nuuk; Attendance: 200; Referees: López, Lenci (ARG)
20 June 2018; 12:00	3× (yellow card) 7× (suspension) 1× (red card)	Report	1× (yellow card) 6× (suspension) 1× (red card)	Inussivik, Nuuk; Attendance: 200; Referees: López, Lenci (ARG)

20 June 2018; 16:00	Uruguay	26–22	Colombia	Inussivik, Nuuk; Attendance: 219; Referees: Rocha, Magalhães (BRA)
20 June 2018; 16:00	Chaparro 5	(13–12)	Cardona 5	Inussivik, Nuuk; Attendance: 219; Referees: Rocha, Magalhães (BRA)
20 June 2018; 16:00	2× (yellow card) 4× (suspension)	Report	2× (yellow card) 7× (suspension) 1× (red card)	Inussivik, Nuuk; Attendance: 219; Referees: Rocha, Magalhães (BRA)

20 June 2018; 20:00	Greenland	26–36	Brazil	Inussivik, Nuuk; Attendance: 2,150; Referees: Sosa, Lemes (URU)
20 June 2018; 20:00	Høegh 8	(11–21)	Chiuffa 7	Inussivik, Nuuk; Attendance: 2,150; Referees: Sosa, Lemes (URU)
20 June 2018; 20:00	5× (suspension) 1× (red card)	Report	2× (yellow card) 2× (suspension)	Inussivik, Nuuk; Attendance: 2,150; Referees: Sosa, Lemes (URU)

21 June 2018; 12:00	Colombia	24–22	Paraguay	Inussivik, Nuuk; Attendance: 150; Referees: Meneses, Pinto (BRA)
21 June 2018; 12:00	S. Restrepo 7	(11–12)	Garcete 6	Inussivik, Nuuk; Attendance: 150; Referees: Meneses, Pinto (BRA)
21 June 2018; 12:00	2× (yellow card) 6× (suspension)	Report	3× (yellow card) 7× (suspension)	Inussivik, Nuuk; Attendance: 150; Referees: Meneses, Pinto (BRA)

21 June 2018; 16:00	Brazil	35–21	Uruguay	Inussivik, Nuuk; Attendance: 300; Referees: Gubica, Milošević (CRO)
21 June 2018; 16:00	Chiuffa 7	(20–8)	Fabra 7	Inussivik, Nuuk; Attendance: 300; Referees: Gubica, Milošević (CRO)
21 June 2018; 16:00		Report	2× (yellow card) 1× (suspension)	Inussivik, Nuuk; Attendance: 300; Referees: Gubica, Milošević (CRO)

21 June 2018; 20:00	Greenland	32–20	Canada	Inussivik, Nuuk; Attendance: 2,200; Referees: López, Lenci (ARG)
21 June 2018; 20:00	Sandgreen 8	(15–9)	Touzel 6	Inussivik, Nuuk; Attendance: 2,200; Referees: López, Lenci (ARG)
21 June 2018; 20:00	2× (yellow card) 4× (suspension)	Report	2× (yellow card) 4× (suspension) 1× (red card)	Inussivik, Nuuk; Attendance: 2,200; Referees: López, Lenci (ARG)

== Knockout stage ==
=== Bracket ===
Semifinals
23 June
Argentina	39
Greenland	17
23 June
Chile	24
Brazil	32

Final
24 June
Argentina	29
Brazil	24
Third place
24 June
Greenland	36
Chile (ET)	39

5th place bracket

5–8th place semifinals
23 June
Guatemala	15
Uruguay	36
23 June
Puerto Rico	26
Canada	30

Fifth place
24 June
Uruguay	22
Canada	29
Seventh place
24 June
Guatemala	20
Puerto Rico	32

=== Ninth place game ===
23 June 2018; 12:00	Peru	26–33	Colombia	Inussivik, Nuuk; Attendance: 222; Referees: Alaufsen, Sørensen (GRL)
23 June 2018; 12:00	Buitrón 6	(15–15)	S. Restrepo 11	Inussivik, Nuuk; Attendance: 222; Referees: Alaufsen, Sørensen (GRL)
23 June 2018; 12:00	4× (yellow card) 2× (suspension)	Report	1× (yellow card) 3× (suspension)	Inussivik, Nuuk; Attendance: 222; Referees: Alaufsen, Sørensen (GRL)

=== 5–8th place semifinals ===
23 June 2018; 14:00	Puerto Rico	26–30	Canada	Inussivik, Nuuk; Attendance: 200; Referees: Sosa, Lemes (URU)
23 June 2018; 14:00	Hiraldo 10	(14–14)	Mercier 8	Inussivik, Nuuk; Attendance: 200; Referees: Sosa, Lemes (URU)
23 June 2018; 14:00	3× (yellow card) 2× (suspension)	Report	1× (yellow card) 2× (suspension)	Inussivik, Nuuk; Attendance: 200; Referees: Sosa, Lemes (URU)

23 June 2018; 16:00	Guatemala	15–36	Uruguay	Inussivik, Nuuk; Attendance: 400; Referees: Rocha, Magalhães (BRA)
23 June 2018; 16:00	Herrera 4	(7–17)	Melián, Rostagno 6	Inussivik, Nuuk; Attendance: 400; Referees: Rocha, Magalhães (BRA)
23 June 2018; 16:00	1× (yellow card) 5× (suspension)	Report	2× (suspension)	Inussivik, Nuuk; Attendance: 400; Referees: Rocha, Magalhães (BRA)

=== Semifinals ===
23 June 2018; 18:00	Chile	24–32	Brazil	Inussivik, Nuuk; Attendance: 2,122; Referees: López, Lenci (ARG)
23 June 2018; 18:00	Ayala 5	(11–14)	Toledo 10	Inussivik, Nuuk; Attendance: 2,122; Referees: López, Lenci (ARG)
23 June 2018; 18:00	4× (yellow card) 5× (suspension) 1× (red card)	Report	3× (yellow card) 3× (suspension)	Inussivik, Nuuk; Attendance: 2,122; Referees: López, Lenci (ARG)

23 June 2018; 20:15	Argentina	39–17	Greenland	Inussivik, Nuuk; Attendance: 2,460; Referees: Lah, Sok (SLO)
23 June 2018; 20:15	four players 5	(17–8)	Høegh 3	Inussivik, Nuuk; Attendance: 2,460; Referees: Lah, Sok (SLO)
23 June 2018; 20:15	2× (yellow card) 6× (suspension)	Report	4× (suspension) 1× (red card)	Inussivik, Nuuk; Attendance: 2,460; Referees: Lah, Sok (SLO)

=== Seventh place game ===
24 June 2018; 10:00	Guatemala	20–32	Puerto Rico	Inussivik, Nuuk; Attendance: 92; Referees: Alaufsen, Sørensen (GRL)
24 June 2018; 10:00	Grijalva, Herrera 4	(10–18)	Gutiérrez, P. Rodríguez 7	Inussivik, Nuuk; Attendance: 92; Referees: Alaufsen, Sørensen (GRL)
24 June 2018; 10:00	1× (yellow card) 1× (suspension)	Report	2× (yellow card) 1× (suspension)	Inussivik, Nuuk; Attendance: 92; Referees: Alaufsen, Sørensen (GRL)

=== Fifth place game ===
24 June 2018; 12:00	Uruguay	22–29	Canada	Inussivik, Nuuk; Attendance: 800; Referees: Meneses, Pinto (BRA)
24 June 2018; 12:00	Fabra 4	(9–14)	Larouche, Touzel 5	Inussivik, Nuuk; Attendance: 800; Referees: Meneses, Pinto (BRA)
24 June 2018; 12:00	3× (yellow card) 5× (suspension)	Report	2× (yellow card) 5× (suspension)	Inussivik, Nuuk; Attendance: 800; Referees: Meneses, Pinto (BRA)

=== Third place game ===
24 June 2018
14:00
Greenland
36–39 (ET)
Chile
Inussivik, Nuuk
Attendance: 2,420
Referees: Gubica, Milošević (CRO)
Høegh 12
(16–16)
R. Salinas 12
1× (yellow card) 4× (suspension)
Report
4× (yellow card) 6× (suspension)

FT: 31–31 ET: 5–8

=== Final ===
24 June 2018; 16:00	Argentina	29–24	Brazil	Inussivik, Nuuk; Attendance: 1,730; Referees: Lah, Sok (SLO)
24 June 2018; 16:00	F. Pizarro 10	(13–8)	Dos Santos 7	Inussivik, Nuuk; Attendance: 1,730; Referees: Lah, Sok (SLO)
24 June 2018; 16:00	1× (yellow card) 5× (suspension)	Report	2× (yellow card) 4× (suspension)	Inussivik, Nuuk; Attendance: 1,730; Referees: Lah, Sok (SLO)

== Final ranking ==
Qualified for the 2019 World Championship

Rank	Team
Gold medal	Argentina
Silver medal	Brazil
Bronze medal	Chile
4	Greenland
5	Canada
6	Uruguay
7	Puerto Rico
8	Guatemala
9	Colombia
10	Peru
11	Paraguay

== Awards ==
All-star team

- Best player: (Brazil) Henrique Teixeira
- Goalkeeper: (Greenland) Isak Olsen
- Right Wing: (Brazil) Fábio Chiuffa
- Right Back: (Brazil) José Toledo
- Playmaker: (Argentina) Sebastián Simonet
- Left Back: (Brazil) Thiagus dos Santos
- Left Wing: (Argentina) Federico Fernández
- Pivot: (Chile) Esteban Salinas
