= 2016 Pan American Men's Handball Championship =

Tournament details
- Host country: Argentina
- Venue(s): 1 (in 1 host city)
- Dates: 11–19 June
- Teams: 12 (from 1 confederation)

Final positions
- Champions: Brazil (3rd title)
- Runners-up: Chile
- Third place: Argentina
- Fourth place: Uruguay

Tournament statistics
- Matches played: 40
- Goals scored: 2,210 (55.25 per match)
- Top scorer(s): (Greenland) Minik Dahl Høegh (56 goals)

Awards
- Best player: (Greenland) Minik Dahl Høegh

The 2016 Pan American Men's Handball Championship was the 17th official competition for senior men's national handball teams of North, Center, Caribbean and South America. It was held from 11 to 19 June 2016 at the Tecnópolis in Buenos Aires, Argentina. It also acted as the qualifying competition for the 2017 World Men's Handball Championship in France, securing three vacancies for the World Championship.

Brazil won the tournament for the third time after defeating Chile 28–24 in the final.

== Participating teams ==
- Argentina
- Brazil
- Canada
- Chile
- Colombia
- Greenland
- Guatemala
- Mexico
- Paraguay
- Puerto Rico
- United States
- Uruguay

Venezuela was originally qualified but withdrew due to economic trouble. The Pan-American Team Handball Federation chose Mexico to replace it.

== Preliminary round ==
The draw was held on 23 April 2016 at the Planetario in Buenos Aires.

All times are local (UTC−3).

=== Group A ===
| Pos | Team | Pld | W | D | L | GF | GA | GD | Pts | Qualification |
|---|---|---|---|---|---|---|---|---|---|---|
| 1 | Chile | 5 | 4 | 0 | 1 | 171 | 109 | +62 | 8 (Note: Chile 2 Pts, +7 GD; Argentina 2 Pts, −1 GD; Greenland 2 Pts, −6 GD) | Semifinals |
| 2 | Argentina (H) | 5 | 4 | 0 | 1 | 161 | 88 | +73 | 8 | Semifinals |
| 3 | Greenland | 5 | 4 | 0 | 1 | 166 | 131 | +35 | 8 | |
| 4 | Mexico | 5 | 2 | 0 | 3 | 122 | 159 | −37 | 4 | |
| 5 | Canada | 5 | 1 | 0 | 4 | 110 | 162 | −52 | 2 | |
| 6 | Guatemala | 5 | 0 | 0 | 5 | 101 | 182 | −81 | 0 | |

Source: Panamericanohandball2016
Rules for classification: 1) Points; 2) Head-to-head points; 3) Head-to-head goal difference; 4) Head-to-head goals scored; 5) Goal difference; 6) Goals scored; 7) Draw.
(H) Hosts
Notes:

| 11 June 2016; 15:10 | Chile | 30–21 | Mexico | Tecnópolis, Buenos Aires; Referees: Sosa, Lemes |
| 11 June 2016; 15:10 | Baeza 7 | (18–10) | Al. Villalobos 9 | Tecnópolis, Buenos Aires; Referees: Sosa, Lemes |
| 11 June 2016; 15:10 | 3× (yellow card) | Report | 1× (yellow card) 1× (suspension) | Tecnópolis, Buenos Aires; Referees: Sosa, Lemes |

| 11 June 2016; 17:00 | Greenland | 31–24 | Canada | Tecnópolis, Buenos Aires; Referees: Oliveira, Nascimento |
| 11 June 2016; 17:00 | Høegh 6 | (16–10) | Sartisson 9 | Tecnópolis, Buenos Aires; Referees: Oliveira, Nascimento |
| 11 June 2016; 17:00 | 3× (yellow card) 3× (suspension) | Report | 3× (yellow card) 5× (suspension) | Tecnópolis, Buenos Aires; Referees: Oliveira, Nascimento |

| 11 June 2016; 17:00 | Argentina | 37–12 | Guatemala | Tecnópolis, Buenos Aires; Referees: Reyes, Zuñiga |
| 11 June 2016; 17:00 | Fernández 8 | (19–3) | Herrera 4 | Tecnópolis, Buenos Aires; Referees: Reyes, Zuñiga |
| 11 June 2016; 17:00 | 2× (suspension) | Report | 3× (yellow card) 4× (suspension) | Tecnópolis, Buenos Aires; Referees: Reyes, Zuñiga |

| 12 June 2016; 15:00 | Canada | 13–37 | Argentina | Tecnópolis, Buenos Aires; Referees: Ojeda, Zapata |
| 12 June 2016; 15:00 | Sartisson, Touzel 3 | (5–17) | Fernández 8 | Tecnópolis, Buenos Aires; Referees: Ojeda, Zapata |
| 12 June 2016; 15:00 | 3× (yellow card) 4× (suspension) | Report | 2× (yellow card) 3× (suspension) | Tecnópolis, Buenos Aires; Referees: Ojeda, Zapata |

| 12 June 2016; 16:00 | Mexico | 24–36 | Greenland | Tecnópolis, Buenos Aires; Referees: Pinto, Menezes |
| 12 June 2016; 16:00 | Al. Villalobos 6 | (12–18) | Høegh, Ingemann 7 | Tecnópolis, Buenos Aires; Referees: Pinto, Menezes |
| 12 June 2016; 16:00 | 1× (yellow card) 3× (suspension) 1× (red card) | Report | 1× (yellow card) 3× (suspension) | Tecnópolis, Buenos Aires; Referees: Pinto, Menezes |

| 12 June 2016; 18:00 | Guatemala | 11–41 | Chile | Tecnópolis, Buenos Aires; Referees: Quadros, Lima |
| 12 June 2016; 18:00 | Garrido, Grijalva 3 | (7–21) | Er. Feuchtmann, E. Salinas 7 | Tecnópolis, Buenos Aires; Referees: Quadros, Lima |
| 12 June 2016; 18:00 | 1× (yellow card) 1× (red card) | Report | 2× (yellow card) 4× (suspension) 1× (red card) | Tecnópolis, Buenos Aires; Referees: Quadros, Lima |

| 13 June 2016; 15:00 | Argentina | 42–17 | Mexico | Tecnópolis, Buenos Aires; Referees: Oliveira, Nascimento |
| 13 June 2016; 15:00 | Pizarro 8 | (21–7) | three players 3 | Tecnópolis, Buenos Aires; Referees: Oliveira, Nascimento |
| 13 June 2016; 15:00 | 3× (yellow card) 6× (suspension) | Report | 3× (yellow card) 2× (suspension) 1× (red card) | Tecnópolis, Buenos Aires; Referees: Oliveira, Nascimento |

| 13 June 2016; 16:00 | Guatemala | 24–27 | Canada | Tecnópolis, Buenos Aires; Referees: Prieto, González |
| 13 June 2016; 16:00 | Grijalva, Herrera 5 | (7–18) | Spence 8 | Tecnópolis, Buenos Aires; Referees: Prieto, González |
| 13 June 2016; 16:00 | 2× (yellow card) 3× (suspension) | Report | 3× (yellow card) 4× (suspension) | Tecnópolis, Buenos Aires; Referees: Prieto, González |

| 13 June 2016; 19:00 | Chile | 37–29 | Greenland | Tecnópolis, Buenos Aires; Referees: Tonnies, Schulze |
| 13 June 2016; 19:00 | R. Salinas 8 | (16–16) | Høegh 16 | Tecnópolis, Buenos Aires; Referees: Tonnies, Schulze |
| 13 June 2016; 19:00 | 2× (yellow card) 4× (suspension) | Report | 2× (yellow card) 5× (suspension) 1× (red card) | Tecnópolis, Buenos Aires; Referees: Tonnies, Schulze |

| 15 June 2016; 15:00 | Greenland | 25–23 | Argentina | Tecnópolis, Buenos Aires; Referees: Quadros, Lima |
| 15 June 2016; 15:00 | Kreutzmann 8 | (12–12) | P. Simonet 6 | Tecnópolis, Buenos Aires; Referees: Quadros, Lima |
| 15 June 2016; 15:00 | 3× (yellow card) 2× (suspension) | Report | 2× (yellow card) 5× (suspension) | Tecnópolis, Buenos Aires; Referees: Quadros, Lima |

| 15 June 2016; 16:00 | Mexico | 32–31 | Guatemala | Tecnópolis, Buenos Aires; Referees: Pinto, Menezes |
| 15 June 2016; 16:00 | Ávalos, Morales 6 | (19–13) | Martínez 8 | Tecnópolis, Buenos Aires; Referees: Pinto, Menezes |
| 15 June 2016; 16:00 | 3× (yellow card) 4× (suspension) | Report | 3× (yellow card) 3× (suspension) | Tecnópolis, Buenos Aires; Referees: Pinto, Menezes |

| 15 June 2016; 19:00 | Chile | 42–26 | Canada | Tecnópolis, Buenos Aires; Referees: Sosa, Lemes |
| 15 June 2016; 19:00 | Er. Feuchtmann 7 | (23–12) | Touzel 11 | Tecnópolis, Buenos Aires; Referees: Sosa, Lemes |
| 15 June 2016; 19:00 | 2× (yellow card) 5× (suspension) 1× (red card) | Report | 2× (yellow card) 5× (suspension) 2× (red card) | Tecnópolis, Buenos Aires; Referees: Sosa, Lemes |

| 16 June 2016; 15:00 | Greenland | 45–23 | Guatemala | Tecnópolis, Buenos Aires |
| 16 June 2016; 15:00 | Moller 16 | (25–13) | Herrera 9 | Tecnópolis, Buenos Aires |
| 16 June 2016; 15:00 | 1× (yellow card) 2× (suspension) | Report | 1× (yellow card) 1× (suspension) | Tecnópolis, Buenos Aires |

| 16 June 2016; 18:00 | Canada | 20–28 | Mexico | Tecnópolis, Buenos Aires |
| 16 June 2016; 18:00 | Sartisson 5 | (12–13) | Morales 8 | Tecnópolis, Buenos Aires |
| 16 June 2016; 18:00 | 3× (yellow card) 3× (suspension) | Report | 3× (yellow card) 4× (suspension) | Tecnópolis, Buenos Aires |

| 16 June 2016; 19:00 | Argentina | 22–21 | Chile | Tecnópolis, Buenos Aires |
| 16 June 2016; 19:00 | Vieyra 7 | (15–8) | Em. Feuchtmann 5 | Tecnópolis, Buenos Aires |
| 16 June 2016; 19:00 | 3× (yellow card) 6× (suspension) 1× (red card) | Report | 2× (yellow card) 6× (suspension) | Tecnópolis, Buenos Aires |

=== Group B ===
| Pos | Team | Pld | W | D | L | GF | GA | GD | Pts | Qualification |
|---|---|---|---|---|---|---|---|---|---|---|
| 1 | Brazil | 5 | 5 | 0 | 0 | 214 | 78 | +136 | 10 | Semifinals |
| 2 | Uruguay | 5 | 4 | 0 | 1 | 135 | 113 | +22 | 8 | Semifinals |
| 3 | Puerto Rico | 5 | 3 | 0 | 2 | 145 | 143 | +2 | 6 | |
| 4 | United States | 5 | 2 | 0 | 3 | 122 | 143 | −21 | 4 | |
| 5 | Colombia | 5 | 1 | 0 | 4 | 100 | 169 | −69 | 2 | |
| 6 | Paraguay | 5 | 0 | 0 | 5 | 115 | 185 | −70 | 0 | |

Source: Panamericanohandball2016
Rules for classification: 1) Points; 2) Head-to-head points; 3) Head-to-head goal difference; 4) Head-to-head goals scored; 5) Goal difference; 6) Goals scored; 7) Draw.

| 11 June 2016; 15:00 | United States | 26–31 | Puerto Rico | Tecnópolis, Buenos Aires; Referees: Grillo, Lenci |
| 11 June 2016; 15:00 | Hines 9 | (15–13) | Nazario 11 | Tecnópolis, Buenos Aires; Referees: Grillo, Lenci |
| 11 June 2016; 15:00 | 1× (yellow card) 1× (suspension) | Report | 2× (yellow card) 2× (suspension) | Tecnópolis, Buenos Aires; Referees: Grillo, Lenci |

| 11 June 2016; 20:05 | Brazil | 54–14 | Paraguay | Tecnópolis, Buenos Aires; Referees: Christiansen, Hesseldal Hansen |
| 11 June 2016; 20:05 | Chiuffa 11 | (30–7) | Pérez 4 | Tecnópolis, Buenos Aires; Referees: Christiansen, Hesseldal Hansen |
| 11 June 2016; 20:05 | 2× (yellow card) 2× (suspension) | Report | 2× (yellow card) 3× (suspension) | Tecnópolis, Buenos Aires; Referees: Christiansen, Hesseldal Hansen |

| 11 June 2016; 20:00 | Uruguay | 33–11 | Colombia | Tecnópolis, Buenos Aires; Referees: Burgos, Delgado |
| 11 June 2016; 20:00 | Lees 5 | (14–5) | Restrepo 4 | Tecnópolis, Buenos Aires; Referees: Burgos, Delgado |
| 11 June 2016; 20:00 | 1× (yellow card) 3× (suspension) | Report | 3× (yellow card) 3× (suspension) | Tecnópolis, Buenos Aires; Referees: Burgos, Delgado |

| 12 June 2016; 17:00 | Puerto Rico | 24–38 | Brazil | Tecnópolis, Buenos Aires; Referees: Ochatt, Hernalz |
| 12 June 2016; 17:00 | Hiraldo, Nazario 5 | (15–20) | Chiuffa 7 | Tecnópolis, Buenos Aires; Referees: Ochatt, Hernalz |
| 12 June 2016; 17:00 | 2× (yellow card) 5× (suspension) | Report | 2× (yellow card) 1× (suspension) | Tecnópolis, Buenos Aires; Referees: Ochatt, Hernalz |

| 12 June 2016; 19:00 | Paraguay | 19–34 | Uruguay | Tecnópolis, Buenos Aires; Referees: Schulze, Tonnies |
| 12 June 2016; 19:00 | Pérez, Ramiro 4 | (10–15) | five players 4 | Tecnópolis, Buenos Aires; Referees: Schulze, Tonnies |
| 12 June 2016; 19:00 | 3× (yellow card) 5× (suspension) | Report | 3× (yellow card) 5× (suspension) | Tecnópolis, Buenos Aires; Referees: Schulze, Tonnies |

| 12 June 2016; 20:05 | Colombia | 21–29 | United States | Tecnópolis, Buenos Aires; Referees: Christiansen, Hesseldal Hansen |
| 12 June 2016; 20:05 | Montoya 5 | (9–12) | Reed 9 | Tecnópolis, Buenos Aires; Referees: Christiansen, Hesseldal Hansen |
| 12 June 2016; 20:05 | 1× (yellow card) 4× (suspension) | Report | 3× (yellow card) 5× (suspension) | Tecnópolis, Buenos Aires; Referees: Christiansen, Hesseldal Hansen |

| 13 June 2016; 17:00 | Brazil | 42–10 | Colombia | Tecnópolis, Buenos Aires; Referees: Zavalla, Moraga |
| 13 June 2016; 17:00 | Chiuffa, Ribeiro 7 | (21–7) | Restrepo 4 | Tecnópolis, Buenos Aires; Referees: Zavalla, Moraga |
| 13 June 2016; 17:00 | 3× (yellow card) 2× (suspension) | Report | 1× (yellow card) 4× (suspension) | Tecnópolis, Buenos Aires; Referees: Zavalla, Moraga |

| 13 June 2016; 18:00 | Paraguay | 26–34 | Puerto Rico | Tecnópolis, Buenos Aires; Referees: Burgos, Delgado |
| 13 June 2016; 18:00 | Pérez 5 | (13–17) | Hiraldo, Nazario 8 | Tecnópolis, Buenos Aires; Referees: Burgos, Delgado |
| 13 June 2016; 18:00 | 3× (yellow card) 5× (suspension) | Report | 3× (yellow card) 7× (suspension) | Tecnópolis, Buenos Aires; Referees: Burgos, Delgado |

| 13 June 2016; 20:00 | Uruguay | 26–21 | United States | Tecnópolis, Buenos Aires; Referees: Zuñiga, Reyes |
| 13 June 2016; 20:00 | Cancio, Velazco 4 | (13–9) | Hines, Inahara 6 | Tecnópolis, Buenos Aires; Referees: Zuñiga, Reyes |
| 13 June 2016; 20:00 | 1× (yellow card) 5× (suspension) | Report | 2× (yellow card) 5× (suspension) | Tecnópolis, Buenos Aires; Referees: Zuñiga, Reyes |

| 15 June 2016; 17:00 | United States | 15–40 | Brazil | Tecnópolis, Buenos Aires; Referees: Burgos, Delgado |
| 15 June 2016; 17:00 | Hines 6 | (5–20) | Cândido 6 | Tecnópolis, Buenos Aires; Referees: Burgos, Delgado |
| 15 June 2016; 17:00 | 3× (yellow card) 4× (suspension) | Report | 2× (yellow card) 3× (suspension) | Tecnópolis, Buenos Aires; Referees: Burgos, Delgado |

| 15 June 2016; 18:00 | Uruguay | 27–22 | Puerto Rico | Tecnópolis, Buenos Aires; Referees: Lenci, López Grillo |
| 15 June 2016; 18:00 | Velazco 14 | (13–13) | Nazario 10 | Tecnópolis, Buenos Aires; Referees: Lenci, López Grillo |
| 15 June 2016; 18:00 | 2× (yellow card) 2× (suspension) | Report | 1× (yellow card) 2× (suspension) | Tecnópolis, Buenos Aires; Referees: Lenci, López Grillo |

| 15 June 2016; 20:00 | Colombia | 32–31 | Paraguay | Tecnópolis, Buenos Aires; Referees: Ochatt, Hernalz |
| 15 June 2016; 20:00 | Restrepo 8 | (14–16) | Mendoza Cazal 8 | Tecnópolis, Buenos Aires; Referees: Ochatt, Hernalz |
| 15 June 2016; 20:00 | 1× (yellow card) 2× (suspension) | Report | 1× (yellow card) 5× (suspension) | Tecnópolis, Buenos Aires; Referees: Ochatt, Hernalz |

| 16 June 2016; 16:00 | Puerto Rico | 34–26 | Colombia | Tecnópolis, Buenos Aires |
| 16 June 2016; 16:00 | Mercado 9 | (17–10) | Mosquera 10 | Tecnópolis, Buenos Aires |
| 16 June 2016; 16:00 | 1× (yellow card) 3× (suspension) | Report | 2× (yellow card) 6× (suspension) | Tecnópolis, Buenos Aires |

| 16 June 2016; 17:00 | Brazil | 40–15 | Uruguay | Tecnópolis, Buenos Aires |
| 16 June 2016; 17:00 | L. Santos, Toledo 6 | (20–7) | Fabra, Morandeira 4 | Tecnópolis, Buenos Aires |
| 16 June 2016; 17:00 | 3× (yellow card) 2× (suspension) | Report | 2× (yellow card) 3× (suspension) | Tecnópolis, Buenos Aires |

| 16 June 2016; 20:00 | United States | 31–25 | Paraguay | Tecnópolis, Buenos Aires |
| 16 June 2016; 20:00 | Hines 5 | (14–13) | Salinas 6 | Tecnópolis, Buenos Aires |
| 16 June 2016; 20:00 | 2× (yellow card) 6× (suspension) | Report | 2× (yellow card) 3× (suspension) | Tecnópolis, Buenos Aires |

== Knockout stage ==
=== Bracket ===
Semifinals
18 June
Chile | 31
Uruguay | 24
18 June
Brazil | 23
Argentina | 20

Final
19 June
Chile | 24
Brazil | 28
Third place
19 June
Uruguay | 13
Argentina | 29

5th place bracket

5–8th place semifinals
18 June
Greenland | 37
United States | 30
18 June
Puerto Rico | 30
Mexico | 29

Fifth place
19 June
Greenland | 44
Puerto Rico | 22
Seventh place
19 June
United States | 27
Mexico | 31

=== 5–8th place semifinals ===
| 18 June 2016; 18:00 | Greenland | 37–30 | United States | Tecnópolis, Buenos Aires |
| 18 June 2016; 18:00 | Høegh 16 | (14–14) | Hines 9 | Tecnópolis, Buenos Aires |
| 18 June 2016; 18:00 | 3× (yellow card) 1× (suspension) | Report | 2× (yellow card) 4× (suspension) | Tecnópolis, Buenos Aires |

| 18 June 2016; 20:00 | Puerto Rico | 30–29 | Mexico | Tecnópolis, Buenos Aires |
| 18 June 2016; 20:00 | Hiraldo 9 | (14–16) | Morales 7 | Tecnópolis, Buenos Aires |
| 18 June 2016; 20:00 | 2× (yellow card) 3× (suspension) | Report | 1× (yellow card) 2× (suspension) | Tecnópolis, Buenos Aires |

=== Semifinals ===
| 18 June 2016; 14:00 | Brazil | 23–20 | Argentina | Tecnópolis, Buenos Aires |
| 18 June 2016; 14:00 | Chiuffa 5 | (9–9) | Fernández 5 | Tecnópolis, Buenos Aires |
| 18 June 2016; 14:00 | 3× (yellow card) 6× (suspension) | Report | 3× (yellow card) 4× (suspension) | Tecnópolis, Buenos Aires |

| 18 June 2016; 16:00 | Chile | 31–24 | Uruguay | Tecnópolis, Buenos Aires |
| 18 June 2016; 16:00 | R. Salinas 7 | (14–13) | Velazco 5 | Tecnópolis, Buenos Aires |
| 18 June 2016; 16:00 | 2× (yellow card) 7× (suspension) 1× (red card) | Report | 1× (yellow card) 2× (suspension) | Tecnópolis, Buenos Aires |

=== Eleventh place game ===
| 18 June 2016; 10:00 | Guatemala | 31–25 | Paraguay | Tecnópolis, Buenos Aires |
| 18 June 2016; 10:00 | M. Morales 7 | (14–16) | Pérez 5 | Tecnópolis, Buenos Aires |
| 18 June 2016; 10:00 | 1× (yellow card) 2× (suspension) | Report | 3× (yellow card) 1× (suspension) | Tecnópolis, Buenos Aires |

=== Ninth place game ===
| 18 June 2016; 12:00 | Canada | 21–29 | Colombia | Tecnópolis, Buenos Aires |
| 18 June 2016; 12:00 | Touzel 6 | (10–14) | Palacio, Restrepo 6 | Tecnópolis, Buenos Aires |
| 18 June 2016; 12:00 | 3× (yellow card) 3× (suspension) | Report | 1× (yellow card) 7× (suspension) 1× (red card) | Tecnópolis, Buenos Aires |

=== Seventh place game ===
| 19 June 2016; 12:30 | United States | 27–31 | Mexico | Tecnópolis, Buenos Aires |
| 19 June 2016; 12:30 | Reed 9 | (15–17) | Sandoval 8 | Tecnópolis, Buenos Aires |
| 19 June 2016; 12:30 | 2× (yellow card) 2× (suspension) | Report | 2× (yellow card) 3× (suspension) | Tecnópolis, Buenos Aires |

=== Fifth place game ===
| 19 June 2016; 14:30 | Greenland | 44–22 | Puerto Rico | Tecnópolis, Buenos Aires |
| 19 June 2016; 14:30 | Kreutzmann 9 | (18–11) | Hiraldo, Nazario 4 | Tecnópolis, Buenos Aires |
| 19 June 2016; 14:30 | 2× (yellow card) 2× (suspension) | Report | 3× (yellow card) 3× (suspension) | Tecnópolis, Buenos Aires |

=== Third place game ===
| 19 June 2016; 19:00 | Uruguay | 13–29 | Argentina | Tecnópolis, Buenos Aires |
| 19 June 2016; 19:00 | Fabra, Rubbo 4 | (5–15) | Pizarro 6 | Tecnópolis, Buenos Aires |
| 19 June 2016; 19:00 | 1× (yellow card) 3× (suspension) | Report | 3× (yellow card) 4× (suspension) | Tecnópolis, Buenos Aires |

=== Final ===
| 19 June 2016; 16:30 | Chile | 24–28 | Brazil | Tecnópolis, Buenos Aires |
| 19 June 2016; 16:30 | Er. Feuchtmann 9 | (12–15) | Pozzer 6 | Tecnópolis, Buenos Aires |
| 19 June 2016; 16:30 | 3× (yellow card) 4× (suspension) | Report | 2× (yellow card) 5× (suspension) | Tecnópolis, Buenos Aires |

== Final ranking ==
| Qualified for the 2017 World Championship |

| Rank | Team |
|---|---|
| Gold medal | Brazil |
| Silver medal | Chile |
| Bronze medal | Argentina |
| 4 | Uruguay |
| 5 | Greenland |
| 6 | Puerto Rico |
| 7 | Mexico |
| 8 | United States |
| 9 | Colombia |
| 10 | Canada |
| 11 | Guatemala |
| 12 | Paraguay |

== Awards ==
All-star team

- Goalkeeper: (Argentina) Matías Schulz
- Right Wing: (Brazil) Fábio Chiuffa
- Right Back: (Chile) Rodrigo Salinas
- Playmaker: (Argentina) Sebastián Simonet
- Left Back: (Greenland) Minik Dahl Høegh
- Left Wing: (Brazil) Felipe Ribeiro
- Pivot: (Chile) Esteban Salinas
