= American Handball Championship =

American Handball Championship may refer to:

- Pan American Men's Handball Championship
- Pan American Women's Handball Championship
