= Jover Hernández =

Cuban handball coach

Jover Jorge Hernández Miranda is a Cuban handball coach who coached the women's and men's Cuban national handball teams.

== Coaching career ==
Hernández led the men's team to victory in the 4th IHF Men's Emerging Nations Championship and the 2024 Nor.Ca. Men's Handball Championship. At the 2025 World Men's Handball Championship, he was the assistant coach on the team under Luis Martínez.

He also coached the women's team during the 2015 World Women's Handball Championship.
