= Minik Dahl Høegh =

Greenlandic handballer

Personal information
- Nationality: Greenlandic
- Born: 4 May 1985 (age 41) Nuuk, Greenland
- Height: 1.95 m (6 ft 5 in)

Sport
- Sport: Handball
- Position: Left back
- Current club: Amo Handboll
- Number: 33

Senior clubs
- Years: Team
- 2008–2010: GOG
- 2010–2011: Fredericia HK
- 2011–2012: Faaborg HK
- 2012–2016: GOG
- 2016–2018: Aarhus Håndbold
- 2018: Skanderborg Håndbold
- 2018–2020: Ajax København
- 2020–2021: TMS Ringsted
- 2021–: Amo Handboll
National team
Years	Team	Apps	(Gls)
2006–	Greenland	38	(190)
Medal record
Nor.Ca. Championship
Silver medal – second place	2022 Mexico
Silver medal – second place	2026 United States
Bronze medal – third place	2024 Mexico

Minik Dahl Høegh (born 4 May 1985) is a Greenlandic handballer, currently playing for Amo Handboll and the Greenlandic national team.

Minik started playing handball at the age of 17. In 2008 he signed a contract with Danish side GOG.

At the 2012 Pan American Men's Handball Championship and 2016 Pan American Men's Handball Championship Minik Dahl Høegh became topscorer and was selected for the all-star team.

Privately he is in a relationship with the Greenlandic-Danish singer Julie Berthelsen. They have two children together, Casper Nanoq Dahl Høegh and Sia Star Dahl Høegh.
