= Nor.Ca. Men's Handball Championship =

Handball championship for North America and Caribbean

The Nor.Ca. Men's Handball Championship is the official competition for men's national handball teams of North America and Caribbean. In addition to crowning the Nor.Ca. champions, the tournament also served as a qualifying tournament for the Pan American Handball Championship. Starting from the 2020 edition the tournament is a qualifying event for the IHF World Men's Handball Championship

== Summary ==
Year	Host	Final			Third place match		
Year	Host	Champion	Score	Runner-up	Third place	Score	Fourth place
2014; Details	Mexico City	Greenland	Round-robin	Cuba	United States	Round-robin	Mexico
2018; Details	Mexico City	Cuba	Round-robin	Canada	Puerto Rico	Round-robin	Mexico
2020; Details		Cancelled due to COVID-19 pandemic in North America			Not played		
2022; Details	Mexico City	United States	33–26	Greenland	Cuba	35–30	Mexico
2024; Details	Mexico City	Cuba	36–21	Mexico	Greenland	29–25	United States
2026; Details	(United States); Bettendorf	United States	32–18	Greenland	Mexico	23–17	Canada

== Medal table ==
Rank	Nation	Gold	Silver	Bronze	Total
1	Cuba	2	1	1	4
2	United States	2	0	1	3
3	Greenland	1	2	1	4
4	Mexico	0	1	1	2
5	Canada	0	1	0	1
6	Puerto Rico	0	0	1	1
Totals (6 entries)		5	5	5	15

== Participating nations ==
Nation	(Mexico) 2014	(Mexico) 2018	(Mexico) 2022	(Mexico) 2024	(United States) 2026	Years
Canada	–	2nd	–	5th	4th	3
Cuba	2nd	1st	3rd	1st	–	4
Dominican Republic	–	6th	–	–	–	1
Greenland	1st	–	2nd	3rd	2nd	4
Mexico	4th	4th	4th	2nd	3rd	5
Puerto Rico	5th	3rd	–	6th	–	3
United States	3rd	5th	1st	4th	1st	5
Total	5	6	4	6	4	

== See also ==
- Nor.Ca. Women's Handball Championship
- Pan American Men's Handball Championship
- Handball at the Pan American Games
