= Gary Hines (handballer) =

American handball player (born 1984)

Personal information
- Born: March 21, 1984 (age 42) Atlanta, United States
- Height: 5 ft 11 in (180 cm)

Sport
- Sport: Handball
- Position: Left/centre back
- Current club: SG Langenfeld

Youth career
- Years: Team
- –: Georgia HC

Senior clubs
- Years: Team
- 2009–2010: DJK Waldbüttelbrunn
- 2010–: HSC Bad Neustadt
National team
Years	Team	Apps	(Gls)
2003–	United States	81	(709)
Medal record
Men's Handball
Representing the United States
Pan American Games
Bronze medal – third place	2003 Santo Domingo	Team
Nor.Ca. Championship
Gold medal – first place	2022 Mexico

Gary Hines (born March 21, 1984) is an American handball player who plays professionally in Germany.

== Career ==
Hines began to play handball at 14 years old, in Atlanta because he was too short for basketball. Between 2009 and 2010 he played for DJK Waldbüttelbrunn in the Bayernliga. In 2010 he moved to HSC Bad Neustadt and has played in the 3. Liga since.

== National team ==
He scored 12 goals in his first international game for Team USA. The next day there was an article "The Hangtime Hines Show" which resulted in his nickname "Hangtime Hines".

== Private life ==
Hines' mother had drug and alcohol problems and never told his father that he has a son.

Between the age of 7 and 14 he grew up in foster care.

At 14 Hines began to live with one family, who he references as the reason for his success.

== Ninja Warrior ==
Hines competed at the Ninja Warrior Germany each year from 2016 to 2021. In 2016 and 2017 he reached the final. In 2018, 2019, 2020 and 2021 he reached the semifinal. In 2022 he competed in American Ninja Warrior.
