= Pierre St. Martin =

Canadian handball player (born 1957)

Pierre Saint Martin (born September 4, 1957) is a Canadian former handball player who competed in the 1976 Summer Olympics.

Born in Saint-Jean-sur-Richelieu, Quebec, Saint Martin was part of the Canadian handball team which finished eleventh in the 1976 Olympic tournament. He played all five matches and scored three goals.
