= 1980 Pan American Men's Handball Championship =

Tournament details
- Host country: Mexico
- Venue(s): 1 (in 1 host city)
- Dates: 7–14 January 1980
- Teams: 6 (from 1 confederation)

Final positions
- Champions: Cuba (1st title)
- Runner-up: Canada
- Third place: United States
- Fourth place: Brazil

Tournament statistics
- Matches played: 15
- Goals scored: 588 (39.2 per match)

The 1980 Pan American Men's Handball Championship was the first edition of the Pan American Men's Handball Championship, held in Mexico from 7 to 14 January 1980. It acted as the American qualifying tournament for the 1980 Summer Olympics. The tournament was planned to be in 1979 but was delayed several times.

== Standings ==
| Pos | Team | Pld | W | D | L | GF | GA | GD | Pts |
|---|---|---|---|---|---|---|---|---|---|
| 1 | Cuba | 5 | 4 | 1 | 0 | 121 | 97 | +24 | 9 |
| 2 | Canada | 5 | 3 | 1 | 1 | 98 | 90 | +8 | 7 |
| 3 | United States | 5 | 3 | 0 | 2 | 115 | 95 | +20 | 6 |
| 4 | Brazil | 5 | 2 | 1 | 2 | 90 | 92 | −2 | 5 |
| 5 | Argentina | 5 | 1 | 0 | 4 | 75 | 99 | −24 | 2 |
| 6 | Mexico (H) | 5 | 0 | 1 | 4 | 89 | 115 | −26 | 1 |

(H) Hosts

== Results ==
| 7 January 1980 | Canada | 22–22 | Mexico | Gimnasio Olímpico Juan de la Barrera, Mexico City |
| 7 January 1980 | Obzygaile 5 | (11–9) | García 7 | Gimnasio Olímpico Juan de la Barrera, Mexico City |

| 7 January 1980 | Cuba | 19–19 | Brazil | Gimnasio Olímpico Juan de la Barrera, Mexico City |
| 7 January 1980 | | (8–12) | Luizinho 6 | Gimnasio Olímpico Juan de la Barrera, Mexico City |

| 7 January 1980 | Argentina | 12–19 | United States | Gimnasio Olímpico Juan de la Barrera, Mexico City |
| 7 January 1980 | | (5–10) | | Gimnasio Olímpico Juan de la Barrera, Mexico City |

| 8 January 1980 | United States | 27–23 | Brazil | Gimnasio Olímpico Juan de la Barrera, Mexico City |
| 8 January 1980 | | (14–10) | | Gimnasio Olímpico Juan de la Barrera, Mexico City |

| 8 January 1980 | Mexico | 15–19 | Argentina | Gimnasio Olímpico Juan de la Barrera, Mexico City |
| 8 January 1980 | Grote 4 | (9–9) | Quipiro 7 | Gimnasio Olímpico Juan de la Barrera, Mexico City |

| 8 January 1980 | Canada | 19–22 | Cuba | Gimnasio Olímpico Juan de la Barrera, Mexico City |
| 8 January 1980 | | (9–8) | | Gimnasio Olímpico Juan de la Barrera, Mexico City |

| 11 January 1980 | Canada | 18–13 | Argentina | Gimnasio Olímpico Juan de la Barrera, Mexico City |
| 11 January 1980 | | (6–5) | | Gimnasio Olímpico Juan de la Barrera, Mexico City |

| 11 January 1980 | Brazil | 14–13 | Mexico | Gimnasio Olímpico Juan de la Barrera, Mexico City |
| 11 January 1980 | | (5–4) | | Gimnasio Olímpico Juan de la Barrera, Mexico City |

| 11 January 1980 | Cuba | 23–20 | United States | Gimnasio Olímpico Juan de la Barrera, Mexico City |
| 11 January 1980 | | (12–9) | | Gimnasio Olímpico Juan de la Barrera, Mexico City |

- According to Folha de S.Paulo 23–22.

| 12 January 1980 | Cuba | 29–17 | Argentina | Gimnasio Olímpico Juan de la Barrera, Mexico City |
| 12 January 1980 | | (17–7) | | Gimnasio Olímpico Juan de la Barrera, Mexico City |

| 12 January 1980 | Canada | 19–16 | Brazil | Gimnasio Olímpico Juan de la Barrera, Mexico City |
| 12 January 1980 | | (9–9) | | Gimnasio Olímpico Juan de la Barrera, Mexico City |

| 12 January 1980 | Mexico | 17–32 | United States | Gimnasio Olímpico Juan de la Barrera, Mexico City |
| 12 January 1980 | | (7–13) | | Gimnasio Olímpico Juan de la Barrera, Mexico City |

| 14 January 1980 | Canada | 20–17 | United States | Gimnasio Olímpico Juan de la Barrera, Mexico City |
| 14 January 1980 | | (10–10) | | Gimnasio Olímpico Juan de la Barrera, Mexico City |

| 14 January 1980 | Argentina | 14–18 | Brazil | Gimnasio Olímpico Juan de la Barrera, Mexico City |
| 14 January 1980 | | (5–6) | | Gimnasio Olímpico Juan de la Barrera, Mexico City |

| 14 January 1980 | Mexico | 22–28 | Cuba | Gimnasio Olímpico Juan de la Barrera, Mexico City |
| 14 January 1980 | | (12–14) | | Gimnasio Olímpico Juan de la Barrera, Mexico City |

== Final ranking ==
| Qualified for the 1980 Summer Olympics |

| Rank | Team |
|---|---|
| Gold medal | Cuba |
| Silver medal | Canada |
| Bronze medal | United States |
| 4 | Brazil |
| 5 | Argentina |
| 6 | Mexico |

== Teams ==
=== Argentina ===
- Players (Incomplete): Alejandro Quipiro, Alejandro Rodríguez, Horacio García, Juan Simonet

=== Brasilia ===
- Coach: Antonio Carlos Simões
- Players: William, Sergião, Chu, Montanha, Luizinho, Borracheiro, Mané, Roni, Foguete, Toco and Duilio Saba

=== Canada ===
- Players (Incomplete): Dems Obzygaile, Pierre St. Martin, Hugues de Roussan

=== Mexico ===
- Coach: David Quintos
- Players (Incomplete): Mario García, Werner Damm, Carlos García, Herber Grote, Ricardo Bermejo, Carlos Meza, Cuauhtémoc Sánchez
