= 1983 Pan American Men's Handball Championship =

Tournament details
- Host country: United States
- Venue(s): 1 (in 1 host city)
- Dates: 13–21 January 1984
- Teams: 6 (from 1 confederation)

Final positions
- Champions: Cuba (3rd title)
- Runner-up: United States
- Third place: Canada
- Fourth place: Brazil

Tournament statistics
- Matches played: 15
- Goals scored: 690 (46 per match)

The 1983 Pan American Men's Handball Championship was the third edition of the tournament, held in Colorado Springs, United States from 13 to 21 January 1984. It acted as the American qualifying tournament for the 1984 Summer Olympics, where the top placed team qualied.

== Standings ==
Pos	Team	Pld	W	D	L	GF	GA	GD	Pts
1st place, gold medalist(s)	Cuba	5	4	1	0	161	86	+75	9 (Note: Cuba 19–19 United States)
2nd place, silver medalist(s)	United States (H)	5	4	1	0	136	73	+63	9
3rd place, bronze medalist(s)	Canada	5	3	0	2	113	98	+15	6
4	Brazil	5	2	0	3	110	105	+5	4
5	Mexico	5	1	0	4	91	108	−17	2
6	Puerto Rico	5	0	0	5	79	220	−141	0

Source: Todor66
Rules for classification: 1) points; 2) head-to-head points; 3) head-to-head goal difference; 4) head-to-head number of goals scored; 5) goal difference.
(H) Hosts

== Results ==
13 January 1984	Canada	20–12	Mexico
13 January 1984		(9–5)

13 January 1984	Cuba	26–16	Brazil

13 January 1984	United States	49–7	Puerto Rico
13 January 1984		(24–2)

15 January 1984	Cuba	60–20	Puerto Rico

15 January 1984	Brazil	18–13	Mexico

15 January 1984	United States	21–15	Canada

17 January 1984	Brazil	36–16	Puerto Rico

17 January 1984	United States	22–13	Mexico

17 January 1984	Cuba	26–15	Canada

19 January 1984	Canada	38–18	Puerto Rico

19 January 1984	United States	25–19	Brazil

19 January 1984	Cuba	30–16	Mexico

21 January 1984	Mexico	37–18	Puerto Rico

21 January 1984	Canada	25–21	Brazil

21 January 1984	Cuba	19–19	United States
