= 1985 Pan American Men's Handball Championship =

Tournament details
- Host country: Brazil
- Venue(s): 1 (in 1 host city)
- Dates: 28 October – 3 November 1985
- Teams: 6 (from 1 confederation)

Final positions
- Champions: Cuba (4th title)
- Runner-up: United States
- Third place: Brazil
- Fourth place: Mexico

Tournament statistics
- Matches played: 15
- Goals scored: 627 (41.8 per match)

The 1985 Pan American Men's Handball Championship was the fourth edition of the tournament, held in Manaus, Brazil from 28 October to 3 November 1985. It acted as the American qualifying tournament for the 1986 World Championship, where the top placed team qualied.

== Standings ==
Pos	Team	Pld	W	D	L	GF	GA	GD	Pts
1st place, gold medalist(s)	Cuba	5	5	0	0	156	86	+70	10
2nd place, silver medalist(s)	United States	5	4	0	1	112	74	+38	8
3rd place, bronze medalist(s)	Brazil (H)	5	3	0	2	106	94	+12	6
4	Mexico	5	1	1	3	81	125	−44	3
5	Argentina	5	1	0	4	86	122	−36	2
6	Canada	5	0	1	4	86	126	−40	1

Source: Todor66
Rules for classification: 1) points; 2) head-to-head points; 3) head-to-head goal difference; 4) head-to-head number of goals scored; 5) goal difference.
(H) Hosts

== Results ==
28 October 1985	Cuba	28–16	Mexico

28 October 1985	United States	21–16	Argentina

28 October 1985	Brazil	22–14	Canada

29 October 1985	Cuba	38–15	Argentina

29 October 1985	United States	20–11	Canada

29 October 1985	Brazil	27–11	Mexico

30 October 1985	Cuba	40–19	Canada

30 October 1985	Mexico	21–18	Argentina

30 October 1985; 21:00	United States	24–16	Brazil

1 November 1985	Argentina	20–18	Canada

1 November 1985	United States	28–9	Mexico

1 November 1985; 21:00	Cuba	28–17	Brazil

3 November 1985	Cuba	22–19	United States

3 November 1985	Mexico	24–24	Canada

3 November 1985; 14:30	Brazil	24–17	Argentina
