= 2024 Nor.Ca. Men's Handball Championship =

Tournament details
- Host country: Mexico
- Venue: 1 (in 1 host city)
- Dates: 6–12 May
- Teams: 6 (from 1 confederation)

Final positions
- Champions: Cuba (2nd title)
- Runners-up: Mexico
- Third place: Greenland
- Fourth place: United States

Tournament statistics
- Matches played: 18
- Goals scored: 996 (55.33 per match)
- Top scorers: (Greenland) Minik Dahl Høegh (38 goals)

The 2024 Nor.Ca. Men's Handball Championship was the fourth edition of the tournament and takes place in Mexico City, Mexico from 6 to 12 May 2024. The winning team, Cuba, qualified for the 2025 World Men's Handball Championship.

== Teams ==
- Canada
- Cuba
- Greenland
- Mexico
- Puerto Rico
- United States

== Preliminary round ==
=== Standings ===
Pos	Team	Pld	W	D	L	GF	GA	GD	Pts	Qualification
1	Cuba	5	5	0	0	175	110	+65	10	Final
2	Mexico (H)	5	3	0	2	138	132	+6	6 (Note: Mexico 2 Pts, +8 GD; Greenland 2 Pts, –1 GD; United States 2 Pts, –7 GD)	Final
3	Greenland	5	3	0	2	143	137	+6	6	Third place match
4	United States	5	3	0	2	143	150	−7	6	Third place match
5	Puerto Rico	5	1	0	4	111	146	−35	2	Fifth place match
6	Canada	5	0	0	5	123	158	−35	0	Fifth place match

Source: NACHC
Rules for classification: 1) points; 2) head-to-head points; 3) head-to-head goal difference; 4) head-to-head number of goals scored; 5) goal difference.
(H) Hosts

=== Results ===
All times are local (UTC−5).

6 May 2024; 15:30	Greenland	32–23	Canada	Mexico City; Attendance: 100; Referees: Coba, Osalde (MEX)
6 May 2024; 15:30	Ak. Kreutzmann 5	(16–14)	Kuypers 9	Mexico City; Attendance: 100; Referees: Coba, Osalde (MEX)
6 May 2024; 15:30	2× (suspension)	Report	3× (suspension)	Mexico City; Attendance: 100; Referees: Coba, Osalde (MEX)

6 May 2024; 17:30	Cuba	34–17	Puerto Rico	Mexico City; Attendance: 100; Referees: Agramonte, de Jesús (DOM)
6 May 2024; 17:30	Pren 6	(16–9)	Ceballos 6	Mexico City; Attendance: 100; Referees: Agramonte, de Jesús (DOM)
6 May 2024; 17:30	1× (yellow card) 4× (suspension) 1× (red card)	Report	1× (yellow card) 5× (suspension)	Mexico City; Attendance: 100; Referees: Agramonte, de Jesús (DOM)

6 May 2024; 19:30	United States	28–37	Mexico	Mexico City; Attendance: 150; Referees: Estrada, Pineda (COL)
6 May 2024; 19:30	McCauley 5	(12–15)	Rodríguez 6	Mexico City; Attendance: 150; Referees: Estrada, Pineda (COL)
6 May 2024; 19:30	4× (suspension)	Report	4× (suspension)	Mexico City; Attendance: 150; Referees: Estrada, Pineda (COL)

7 May 2024; 14:00	Canada	24–40	Cuba	Mexico City; Attendance: 39; Referees: Osalde, Coba (MEX)
7 May 2024; 14:00	Kuypers 6	(11–19)	Rodríguez 7	Mexico City; Attendance: 39; Referees: Osalde, Coba (MEX)
7 May 2024; 14:00	2× (suspension)	Report	5× (suspension)	Mexico City; Attendance: 39; Referees: Osalde, Coba (MEX)

7 May 2024; 16:00	Puerto Rico	25–26	United States	Mexico City; Attendance: 100; Referees: Agramonte, de Jesús (DOM)
7 May 2024; 16:00	Rodríguez 5	(12–9)	Edwards 6	Mexico City; Attendance: 100; Referees: Agramonte, de Jesús (DOM)
7 May 2024; 16:00	1× (yellow card) 4× (suspension)	Report	3× (suspension)	Mexico City; Attendance: 100; Referees: Agramonte, de Jesús (DOM)

7 May 2024; 18:00	Mexico	25–26	Greenland	Mexico City; Attendance: 316; Referees: Reyes, Zúñiga (CUB)
7 May 2024; 18:00	C. Maya 6	(10–12)	Høegh, Lynge 8	Mexico City; Attendance: 316; Referees: Reyes, Zúñiga (CUB)
7 May 2024; 18:00	4× (suspension) 1× (red card)	Report	6× (suspension)	Mexico City; Attendance: 316; Referees: Reyes, Zúñiga (CUB)

8 May 2024; 14:00	United States	34–26	Canada	Mexico City; Attendance: 110; Referees: Estrada, Pineda (COL)
8 May 2024; 14:00	Edwards 9	(13–14)	three players 6	Mexico City; Attendance: 110; Referees: Estrada, Pineda (COL)
8 May 2024; 14:00	5× (suspension) 1× (red card)	Report	6× (suspension) 1× (red card)	Mexico City; Attendance: 110; Referees: Estrada, Pineda (COL)

8 May 2024; 16:00	Greenland	26–35	Cuba	Mexico City; Attendance: 114; Referees: Agramonte, de Jesús (DOM)
8 May 2024; 16:00	Høegh 8	(12–21)	Almeida 6	Mexico City; Attendance: 114; Referees: Agramonte, de Jesús (DOM)
8 May 2024; 16:00	1× (yellow card) 1× (suspension)	Report	4× (suspension)	Mexico City; Attendance: 114; Referees: Agramonte, de Jesús (DOM)

8 May 2024; 18:00	Mexico	31–20	Puerto Rico	Mexico City; Attendance: 345; Referees: Reyes, Zúñiga (CUB)
8 May 2024; 18:00	Anguiano, O. Maya 5	(14–8)	Rodríguez 5	Mexico City; Attendance: 345; Referees: Reyes, Zúñiga (CUB)
8 May 2024; 18:00	2× (suspension)	Report	3× (suspension) 1× (red card)	Mexico City; Attendance: 345; Referees: Reyes, Zúñiga (CUB)

10 May 2024; 14:00	Greenland	29–22	Puerto Rico	Mexico City; Referees: Reyes, Zúñiga (CUB)
10 May 2024; 14:00	Høegh, Lynge 5	(15–11)	Delgado, González 4	Mexico City; Referees: Reyes, Zúñiga (CUB)
10 May 2024; 14:00	4× (suspension)	Report	4× (suspension) 1× (red card)	Mexico City; Referees: Reyes, Zúñiga (CUB)

10 May 2024; 16:00	Cuba	32–23	United States	Mexico City; Attendance: 120; Referees: Coba, Osalde (MEX)
10 May 2024; 16:00	Cordiés 8	(13–9)	Reed 6	Mexico City; Attendance: 120; Referees: Coba, Osalde (MEX)
10 May 2024; 16:00	1× (yellow card) 4× (suspension)	Report	1× (suspension)	Mexico City; Attendance: 120; Referees: Coba, Osalde (MEX)

10 May 2024; 18:00	Canada	24–25	Mexico	Mexico City; Attendance: 231; Referees: Estrada, Pineda (COL)
10 May 2024; 18:00	De Dudley Gaspard 7	(13–12)	Loya 7	Mexico City; Attendance: 231; Referees: Estrada, Pineda (COL)
10 May 2024; 18:00	1× (suspension)	Report	4× (suspension)	Mexico City; Attendance: 231; Referees: Estrada, Pineda (COL)

11 May 2024; 14:00	Puerto Rico	27–26	Canada	Mexico City; Attendance: 100; Referees: Coba, Osalde (MEX)
11 May 2024; 14:00	Ceballos 8	(16–15)	De Dudley Gaspard 5	Mexico City; Attendance: 100; Referees: Coba, Osalde (MEX)
11 May 2024; 14:00	3× (suspension)	Report	1× (yellow card) 3× (suspension)	Mexico City; Attendance: 100; Referees: Coba, Osalde (MEX)

11 May 2024; 16:00	United States	32–30	Greenland	Mexico City; Referees: Reyes, Zúñiga (CUB)
11 May 2024; 16:00	Amitovic, Campos 6	(15–15)	Høegh 8	Mexico City; Referees: Reyes, Zúñiga (CUB)
11 May 2024; 16:00	3× (suspension)	Report	5× (suspension)	Mexico City; Referees: Reyes, Zúñiga (CUB)

11 May 2024; 18:00	Mexico	20–34	Cuba	Mexico City; Attendance: 400; Referees: Agramonte, de Jesús (DOM)
11 May 2024; 18:00	Morales 4	(9–18)	Rodríguez 9	Mexico City; Attendance: 400; Referees: Agramonte, de Jesús (DOM)
11 May 2024; 18:00	2× (suspension)	Report	1× (yellow card) 3× (suspension)	Mexico City; Attendance: 400; Referees: Agramonte, de Jesús (DOM)

== Final round ==
=== Fifth place match ===
12 May 2024; 13:00	Puerto Rico	23–29	Canada	Mexico City; Attendance: 50; Referees: Reyes, Zúñiga (CUB)
12 May 2024; 13:00	Ildefonso 8	(8–16)	Reinhardt 6	Mexico City; Attendance: 50; Referees: Reyes, Zúñiga (CUB)
12 May 2024; 13:00	6× (suspension)	Report	3× (suspension)	Mexico City; Attendance: 50; Referees: Reyes, Zúñiga (CUB)

=== Third place match ===
12 May 2024; 15:00	United States	25–29	Greenland	Mexico City; Referees: Agramonte, de Jesús (DOM)
12 May 2024; 15:00	Edwards 6	(12–15)	Høegh, Møller 5	Mexico City; Referees: Agramonte, de Jesús (DOM)
12 May 2024; 15:00	2× (suspension)	Report	4× (suspension)	Mexico City; Referees: Agramonte, de Jesús (DOM)

=== Final ===
12 May 2024; 17:00	Cuba	36–21	Mexico	Mexico City; Attendance: 279; Referees: Estrada, Pineda (COL)
12 May 2024; 17:00	Rodríguez 8	(18–10)	Flores 4	Mexico City; Attendance: 279; Referees: Estrada, Pineda (COL)
12 May 2024; 17:00	6× (suspension)	Report	1× (yellow card) 2× (suspension)	Mexico City; Attendance: 279; Referees: Estrada, Pineda (COL)

== Final standing ==
Rank	Team
1st place, gold medalist(s)	Cuba
2nd place, silver medalist(s)	Mexico
3rd place, bronze medalist(s)	Greenland
4	United States
5	Canada
6	Puerto Rico

Qualified for the 2025 World Men's Handball Championship
Qualified for the 2025 World Men's Handball Championship by wildcard

== Official website ==
- Official website
