= Mexico men's national handball team =

Mexico

Information
- Association: Mexican Handball Federation
- Coach: Julio Camarillo

Colours
1st	2nd

Results

Pan American Championship
- Appearances: 15 (First in 1980)
- Best result: 4th (1985)
- Last updated on Unknown.

The Mexico national handball team is the national team of Mexico. It takes part in international handball competitions.

== Tournament record ==
=== Pan American Championship ===
Year	Round	Position	GP	W	D*	L	GS	GA
(Mexico) 1980	round robin	6	5	0	1	4	89	115
(Argentina) 1981	placement matches	5	4	2	0	2	107	98
(United States) 1983	round robin	5	5	1	0	4	91	108
(Brazil) 1985	round robin	4	5	1	1	3	81	125
(Cuba) 1989	round robin	5	5	1	0	4	79	156
(Brazil) 1994	round robin	5	6	2	0	4	116	152
(United States) 1996	placement matches	6	5	2	0	3	117	124
(Cuba) 1998	placement matches	7	6	1	0	5	127	192
(Brazil) 2000	placement matches	7	5	1	0	4	101	147
(Argentina) 2002	placement matches	7	5	1	0	4	82	141
(Chile) 2004	placement matches	8	5	0	1	4	109	165
(Brazil) 2006	placement matches	7	5	1	1	3	122	158
(Argentina) 2012	placement matches	9	5	0	0	5	81	146
(Uruguay) 2014	seventh place match	7	5	1	0	4	123	157
(Argentina) 2016	seventh place match	7	7	3	0	4	182	216

=== Central American and Caribbean Games ===
Games	Round	Position	Pld	W	D	L	GF	GA	GD
(Colombia) 2018 Barranquilla	Bronze medal game	3rd	5	3	0	2	145	146	-1

=== Caribbean Handball Cup ===
Year	Round	Position	GP	W	D*	L	GS	GA
(Colombia) 2017	bronze medal match	4	6	3	0	3	179	174

=== Nor.Ca Championship ===
Year	Round	Position	GP	W	D*	L	GS	GA
(Mexico) 2014	Round robin	4	5	1	3	1	145	142
(Mexico) 2018	Round robin	4	4	1	0	3	100	112
(Mexico) 2022	Bronze medal game	4	4	1	0	3	114	126
(Mexico) 2024	Final	2	6	3	0	3	159	168
(United States) 2026	Bronze medal game	3	4	1	0	3	94	107
