= 2018 Nor.Ca. Men's Handball Championship =

Tournament details
- Host country: Mexico
- Venue(s): 1 (in 1 host city)
- Dates: 3–8 April
- Teams: 6 (from 1 confederation)

Final positions
- Champions: Cuba (1st title)
- Runner-up: Canada
- Third place: Puerto Rico
- Fourth place: Mexico

Tournament statistics
- Matches played: 15
- Goals scored: 871 (58.07 per match)

The 2018 Nor.Ca. Men's Handball Championship was the second edition of the Men's Nor.Ca. Men's Handball Championship. The tournament was held in Mexico City at the Centro deportivo Olimpico Mexicano from 3 to 8 April 2018. It acted as the North American and Caribbean qualifying tournament for the 2018 Pan American Men's Handball Championship.

== Results ==
| Team | Pld | W | D | L | GF | GA | GD | Pts |
|---|---|---|---|---|---|---|---|---|
| Cuba | 5 | 4 | 1 | 0 | 172 | 125 | 47 | 9 |
| Canada | 5 | 3 | 1 | 1 | 136 | 132 | 4 | 7 |
| Puerto Rico | 5 | 2 | 1 | 2 | 143 | 152 | –9 | 5 |
| Mexico | 5 | 1 | 3 | 1 | 145 | 142 | 3 | 5 |
| United States | 5 | 1 | 1 | 3 | 151 | 164 | –13 | 3 |
| Dominican Republic | 5 | 0 | 1 | 4 | 124 | 156 | –32 | 1 |

== Round robin ==
All times are local (UTC−05:00).

| 3 April 2018; 14:00 | Puerto Rico | 27–31 | Canada | Centro deportivo Olimpico Mexicano, Mexico City |

| 3 April 2018; 16:00 | United States | 30–41 | Cuba | Centro deportivo Olimpico Mexicano, Mexico City |

| 3 April 2018; 18:00 | Mexico | 33–28 | Dominican Republic | Centro deportivo Olimpico Mexicano, Mexico City |

| 4 April 2018; 14:00 | Cuba | 36–23 | Puerto Rico | Centro deportivo Olimpico Mexicano, Mexico City |

| 4 April 2018; 16:00 | Dominican Republic | 26–32 | United States | Centro deportivo Olimpico Mexicano, Mexico City |

| 4 April 2018; 18:00 | Canada | 26–26 | Mexico | Centro deportivo Olimpico Mexicano, Mexico City |

| 5 April 2018; 14:00 | Puerto Rico | 29–29 | Dominican Republic | Centro deportivo Olimpico Mexicano, Mexico City |

| 5 April 2018; 16:00 | Canada | 24–27 | Cuba | Centro deportivo Olimpico Mexicano, Mexico City |

| 5 April 2018; 18:00 | Mexico | 30–30 | United States | Centro deportivo Olimpico Mexicano, Mexico City |

| 7 April 2018; 14:00 | United States | 28–34 | Puerto Rico | Centro deportivo Olimpico Mexicano, Mexico City |

| 7 April 2018; 16:00 | Dominican Republic | 21–22 | Canada | Centro deportivo Olimpico Mexicano, Mexico City |

| 7 April 2018; 18:00 | Mexico | 28–28 | Cuba | Centro deportivo Olimpico Mexicano, Mexico City |

| 8 April 2018; 12:00 | United States | 31–33 | Canada | Centro deportivo Olimpico Mexicano, Mexico City |

| 8 April 2018; 14:00 | Cuba | 40–20 | Dominican Republic | Centro deportivo Olimpico Mexicano, Mexico City |

| 8 April 2018; 16:00 | Puerto Rico | 30–28 | Mexico | Centro deportivo Olimpico Mexicano, Mexico City |

== Final standing ==
| Rank | Team |
|---|---|
| Gold medal | Cuba |
| Silver medal | Canada |
| Bronze medal | Puerto Rico |
| 4 | Mexico |
| 5 | United States |
| 6 | Dominican Republic |

| Team qualified to the 2018 Pan American Men's Handball Championship |
