= 2014 Nor.Ca. Men's Handball Championship =

Tournament details
- Host country: Mexico
- Venue(s): 1 (in 1 host city)
- Dates: 25 February – 1 March
- Teams: 5 (from 1 confederation)

Final positions
- Champions: Greenland (1st title)
- Runner-up: Cuba
- Third place: United States
- Fourth place: Mexico

Tournament statistics
- Matches played: 10
- Goals scored: 542 (54.2 per match)

The 2014 Nor.Ca. Men's Handball Championship was the first edition of the Nor.Ca. Men's Handball Championship, held in Mexico City, Mexico from 25 February to 1 March 2014.

== Standings ==
Pos	Team	Pld	W	D	L	GF	GA	GD	Pts
1st place, gold medalist(s)	Greenland	4	4	0	0	131	109	+22	8
2nd place, silver medalist(s)	Cuba	4	3	0	1	109	93	+16	6
3rd place, bronze medalist(s)	United States	4	2	0	2	100	97	+3	4
4	Mexico (H)	4	1	0	3	100	112	−12	2
5	Puerto Rico	4	0	0	4	102	131	−29	0

Source: Todor66
Rules for classification: 1) points; 2) head-to-head points; 3) head-to-head goal difference; 4) head-to-head number of goals scored; 5) goal difference.
(H) Hosts

== Results ==
All times are local (UTC−6).

25 February 2014; 16:00	Greenland	31–27	Cuba	Centro deportivo Olimpico Mexicano, Mexico City
25 February 2014; 16:00		(16–9)		Centro deportivo Olimpico Mexicano, Mexico City

25 February 2014; 18:00	Mexico	33–21	Puerto Rico	Centro deportivo Olimpico Mexicano, Mexico City
25 February 2014; 18:00		(16–8)		Centro deportivo Olimpico Mexicano, Mexico City

26 February 2014; 16:00	Cuba	21–15	United States	Centro deportivo Olimpico Mexicano, Mexico City
26 February 2014; 16:00		(13–5)		Centro deportivo Olimpico Mexicano, Mexico City

26 February 2014; 18:00	Greenland	39–29	Puerto Rico	Centro deportivo Olimpico Mexicano, Mexico City
26 February 2014; 18:00		(18–16)		Centro deportivo Olimpico Mexicano, Mexico City

27 February 2014; 16:00	United States	29–26	Puerto Rico	Centro deportivo Olimpico Mexicano, Mexico City
27 February 2014; 16:00		(13–14)		Centro deportivo Olimpico Mexicano, Mexico City

27 February 2014; 18:00	Greenland	31–26	Mexico	Centro deportivo Olimpico Mexicano, Mexico City
27 February 2014; 18:00		(18–11)		Centro deportivo Olimpico Mexicano, Mexico City

28 February 2014; 16:00	Greenland	30–27	United States	Centro deportivo Olimpico Mexicano, Mexico City
28 February 2014; 16:00		(16–13)		Centro deportivo Olimpico Mexicano, Mexico City

28 February 2014; 18:00	Cuba	31–21	Mexico	Centro deportivo Olimpico Mexicano, Mexico City
28 February 2014; 18:00		(13–10)		Centro deportivo Olimpico Mexicano, Mexico City

1 March 2014; 16:00	Cuba	30–26	Puerto Rico	Centro deportivo Olimpico Mexicano, Mexico City
1 March 2014; 16:00		(14–13)		Centro deportivo Olimpico Mexicano, Mexico City

1 March 2014; 18:00	United States	29–20	Mexico	Centro deportivo Olimpico Mexicano, Mexico City
1 March 2014; 18:00		(14–9)		Centro deportivo Olimpico Mexicano, Mexico City
