= Cuba men's national handball team =

Cuba

Information
- Nickname: Titans
- Association: Federación Cubana de Balonmano
- Coach: Luis Martínez
- Assistant coach: Jover Hernández

Colours
1st	2nd

Results

Summer Olympics
- Appearances: 2 (First in 1980)
- Best result: 11th (1980, 2000)

World Championship
- Appearances: 8 (First in 1982)
- Best result: 8th (1999)

Pan American Championship
- Appearances: 11 (First in 1980)
- Best result: (gold) 1st (1980, 1981, 1983, 1985, 1989, 1994, 1996, 1998)
- Last updated on Unknown.

The Cuba men's national handball team represents Cuba in international handball competitions and is controlled by the Cuban Handball Association.

== Tournament record ==
=== Summer Olympics ===
- 1980 – 11th
- 2000 – 11th

=== World Championship ===
- 1982 – 13th
- 1986 – 15th
- 1990 – 14th
- 1995 – 13th
- 1997 – 14th
- 1999 – 8th
- 2009 – 20th
- 2025 – 32nd

=== Pan American Games ===
Games	Round	Position	Pld	W	D	L	GF	GA	GD
(Canada) 2015 Toronto	5th place match	6th	5	2	1	2	165	152	13

=== Pan American Championship ===
- 1980 – 1st
- 1981 – 1st
- 1983 – 1st
- 1985 – 1st
- 1989 – 1st
- 1994 – 1st
- 1996 – 1st
- 1998 – 1st
- 2000 – 2nd
- 2008 – 3rd
- 2010 – 4th

=== Central American and Caribbean Games ===
Games	Round	Position	Pld	W	D	L	GF	GA	GD
(Colombia) 2018 Barranquilla	Gold medal game	1st	5	5	0	0	172	85	87

=== Caribbean Handball Cup ===
- 2013: 2nd

Year	Round	Position	GP	W	D*	L	GS	GA
(Colombia) 2017	Final	2	6	5	0	1	196	150

=== Nor.Ca Championship ===
Year	Round	Position	GP	W	D*	L	GS	GA
(Mexico) 2014	Round robin	2	5	3	0	1	109	93
(Mexico) 2018	Round robin	1	5	4	1	0	172	125
(Mexico) 2022	Bronze medal game	3	4	1	1	2	119	127
(Mexico) 2024	Final	1	6	6	0	0	211	131

=== IHF Emerging Nations Championship ===
- 2019 – 2nd
- 2023 – 1st

=== Other Competitions ===
- 2015 Four Nations Tournament – 3rd
- 2016 Four Nations Tournament – 3rd
- Torneo Cuatro Naciones de Handball 2023 – 2nd

== Team ==
=== Current squad ===
Squad for the 2025 World Men's Handball Championship.

Head coach: Luis Martínez

No.	Pos.	Name	Date of birth (age)	Height	App.	Goals	Club
1	GK	Adan Calzada	3 September 1998 (age 27)	1.94 m	15	3	(Croatia) MRK Čakovec
2	RB	Ronaldo Almeida	20 August 2002 (age 23)	1.94 m	35	85	(France) US Ivry Handball
7	LW	Frank Cordies	3 June 2000 (age 26)	1.93 m	27	105	(Spain) BM Huesca
9	RW	Osmani Miniet	5 September 2006 (age 19)	1.81 m	0	0	(Cuba) Club Artemisa
10	LW	Hanser Rodríguez	5 May 2000 (age 26)	1.88 m	36	74	(North Macedonia) RK Vardar
11	CB	Christopher Martinez	24 November 2000 (age 25)	1.82 m	15	28	(Portugal) ABC/UMinho
12	GK	Esniel Negret	28 January 2003 (age 23)	1.93 m	0	0	Santiago De Cuba
13	RW	Victor Dawkins	3 April 2001 (age 25)	1.86 m	10	21	(Portugal) C.S. Marítimo
14	LB	Maiko Vázquez	3 September 2003 (age 22)	1.94 m	20	61	(Portugal) Sporting CP
16	GK	Magnol Suárez	10 August 1994 (age 31)	2.00 m	32	6	(Spain) L'Arancina Handbol Mallorca
19	CB	Samuel Cordies	2 November 2002 (age 23)	1.91 m	25	77	(Spain) BM Huesca
21	P	Claudio Ramos	28 July 1998 (age 28)	1.95 m	15	38	(Spain) BM Puente Genil
23	LW	Lafontan Freddy	12 May 2005 (age 21)	1.95 m	5	5	(Portugal) FC Porto
27	P	Eduardo Valiente	15 August 1991 (age 34)	1.97 m	20	31	(Cuba) Erromoko Eskubaloia
32	LW	Dariel García	31 December 1996 (age 29)	1.97 m	21	36	(Spain) CD Bidasoa
91	RB	Adonis García	4 May 1993 (age 33)	1.89 m	33	66	(Spain) CB Alarcos Ciudad Real

=== Player statistics ===
Amongst most capped players, there is :

- Roberto Julián Duranona (OB): 270 caps until 1994
- Vladimir Rivero (GK): 191 caps until 1999
- Carlos Pérez (OB): 171 caps until 1997

Amongst top scorers, there is :

- Roberto Julián Duranona (OB): at least 700 goals until 1994
- Carlos Pérez (OB): at least 600 goals until 1997

=== Notable players ===
- Rafael Capote ? caps → Qatar
- Frankis Carol ? caps → Qatar
- Ivo Díaz 83 caps → Hungary
- Roberto Julián Duranona → Iceland
- Julio Fis 28 caps → Spain
- Jalesky Garcia 11 caps → Iceland
- Carlos Pérez → Hungary
- Alfredo Quintana : 23 caps → Portugal
- Vladimir Rivero → Hungary
- Rolando Uríos 79 caps → Spain

== See also ==
- Cuba women's national handball team
