= 2022 Nor.Ca. Men's Handball Championship =

Tournament details
- Host country: Mexico
- Venue(s): 1 (in 1 host city)
- Dates: 26–30 June
- Teams: 4 (from 1 confederation)

Final positions
- Champions: United States (1st title)
- Runner-up: Greenland
- Third place: Cuba
- Fourth place: Mexico

Tournament statistics
- Matches played: 8
- Goals scored: 472 (59 per match)
- Top scorer(s): (Cuba) Hanser Rodríguez (Greenland) Minik Dahl Høegh (29 goals each)

The 2022 Nor.Ca. Men's Handball Championship was the third edition of the tournament. It took place in Mexico City at the Mexican Olympic Sports Center from 26 to 30 June 2022.

== Preliminary round ==
=== Standings ===
Pos	Team	Pld	W	D	L	GF	GA	GD	Pts	Qualification
1	United States	3	3	0	0	98	76	+22	6	Final
2	Greenland	3	1	1	1	87	89	−2	3	Final
3	Mexico (H)	3	1	0	2	79	87	−8	2	Third place match
4	Cuba	3	0	1	2	80	92	−12	1	Third place match

Source: NACHC
Rules for classification: 1) points; 2) head-to-head points; 3) head-to-head goal difference; 4) head-to-head number of goals scored; 5) goal difference.
(H) Hosts

All times are local (UTC−5).

=== Results ===
26 June 2022; 16:00	Greenland	28–36	United States	Mexican Olympic Sports Center, Mexico City; Referees: Belmonte, Coba (MEX)
26 June 2022; 16:00	Kreutzmann 8	(14–19)	Hoddersen 9	Mexican Olympic Sports Center, Mexico City; Referees: Belmonte, Coba (MEX)
26 June 2022; 16:00	1× (yellow card) 3× (suspension) 1× (red card)	Report	2× (yellow card) 7× (suspension)	Mexican Olympic Sports Center, Mexico City; Referees: Belmonte, Coba (MEX)

26 June 2022; 18:00	Cuba	25–33	Mexico	Mexican Olympic Sports Center, Mexico City; Referees: Mikaelsen, Petersen (GRL)
26 June 2022; 18:00	Garcia 6	(16–13)	Sandoval 7	Mexican Olympic Sports Center, Mexico City; Referees: Mikaelsen, Petersen (GRL)
26 June 2022; 18:00	1× (yellow card) 4× (suspension)	Report	2× (suspension)	Mexican Olympic Sports Center, Mexico City; Referees: Mikaelsen, Petersen (GRL)

27 June 2022; 16:00	Greenland	27–27	Cuba	Mexican Olympic Sports Center, Mexico City; Referees: Augusto, Poulet (USA)
27 June 2022; 16:00	Høegh 11	(12–14)	Rodríguez 9	Mexican Olympic Sports Center, Mexico City; Referees: Augusto, Poulet (USA)
27 June 2022; 16:00	2× (yellow card) 4× (suspension)	Report	1× (yellow card) 5× (suspension) 1× (red card)	Mexican Olympic Sports Center, Mexico City; Referees: Augusto, Poulet (USA)

27 June 2022; 18:00	Mexico	20–30	United States	Mexican Olympic Sports Center, Mexico City; Referees: Reyes, Zuñiga (CUB)
27 June 2022; 18:00	Sandoval 8	(11–17)	Fofana, Hoddersen 6	Mexican Olympic Sports Center, Mexico City; Referees: Reyes, Zuñiga (CUB)
27 June 2022; 18:00	6× (suspension) 1× (red card)	Report	5× (yellow card)	Mexican Olympic Sports Center, Mexico City; Referees: Reyes, Zuñiga (CUB)

28 June 2022; 16:00	United States	32–28	Cuba	Mexican Olympic Sports Center, Mexico City; Referees: Blanco, Santillanes (MEX)
28 June 2022; 16:00	Chan 8	(18–16)	Garcia 7	Mexican Olympic Sports Center, Mexico City; Referees: Blanco, Santillanes (MEX)
28 June 2022; 16:00	1× (yellow card) 5× (suspension)	Report	5× (suspension)	Mexican Olympic Sports Center, Mexico City; Referees: Blanco, Santillanes (MEX)

28 June 2022; 18:00	Mexico	26–32	Greenland	Mexican Olympic Sports Center, Mexico City; Referees: Reyes, Zuñiga (CUB)
28 June 2022; 18:00	Morales 7	(15–16)	Lennert 8	Mexican Olympic Sports Center, Mexico City; Referees: Reyes, Zuñiga (CUB)
28 June 2022; 18:00	1× (yellow card) 2× (suspension)	Report	1× (yellow card) 4× (suspension)	Mexican Olympic Sports Center, Mexico City; Referees: Reyes, Zuñiga (CUB)

== Final round ==
=== Third place match ===
30 June 2022; 16:00	Mexico	30–35	Cuba	Mexican Olympic Sports Center, Mexico City; Referees: Augusto, Poulet (USA)
30 June 2022; 16:00	Ávalos, Sandoval 5	(13–13)	Rodríguez 12	Mexican Olympic Sports Center, Mexico City; Referees: Augusto, Poulet (USA)
30 June 2022; 16:00	2× (yellow card) 3× (suspension)	Report		Mexican Olympic Sports Center, Mexico City; Referees: Augusto, Poulet (USA)

=== Final ===
30 June 2022; 18:00	United States	33–26	Greenland	Mexican Olympic Sports Center, Mexico City; Attendance: 500; Referees: Reyes, Zuñiga (CUB)
30 June 2022; 18:00	Hoddersen 8	(16–15)	Høegh 7	Mexican Olympic Sports Center, Mexico City; Attendance: 500; Referees: Reyes, Zuñiga (CUB)
30 June 2022; 18:00	3× (yellow card) 4× (suspension) 1× (red card)	Report	1× (yellow card) 5× (suspension) 1× (red card)	Mexican Olympic Sports Center, Mexico City; Attendance: 500; Referees: Reyes, Zuñiga (CUB)

== Final standing ==
Rank	Team
1st place, gold medalist(s)	United States
2nd place, silver medalist(s)	Greenland
3rd place, bronze medalist(s)	Cuba
4	Mexico

Qualified for the 2023 World Men's Handball Championship
