= 1981 Pan American Men's Handball Championship =

Tournament details
- Host country: Argentina
- Venue(s): 1 (in 1 host city)
- Dates: 9–14 November
- Teams: 7 (from 1 confederation)

Final positions
- Champions: Cuba (2nd title)
- Runners-up: Brazil
- Third place: United States
- Fourth place: Argentina

Tournament statistics
- Matches played: 15
- Goals scored: 793 (52.87 per match)

The 1981 Pan American Men's Handball Championship was the second edition of the tournament, held in Buenos Aires, Argentina from 9 to 14 November 1981. It acted as the American qualifying tournament for the 1982 World Championship.

== Preliminary round ==
=== Group A ===
| Pos | Team | Pld | W | D | L | GF | GA | GD | Pts | Qualification |
|---|---|---|---|---|---|---|---|---|---|---|
| 1 | Argentina (H) | 3 | 3 | 0 | 0 | 85 | 51 | +34 | 6 | Semifinals |
| 2 | United States | 3 | 2 | 0 | 1 | 121 | 46 | +75 | 4 | Semifinals |
| 3 | Paraguay | 3 | 1 | 0 | 2 | 58 | 101 | −43 | 2 | |
| 4 | Chile | 3 | 0 | 0 | 3 | 40 | 106 | −66 | 0 | |

Source: Todor66
Rules for classification: 1) points; 2) head-to-head points; 3) head-to-head goal difference; 4) head-to-head number of goals scored; 5) goal difference.
(H) Hosts

9 November 1981
Argentina
23–22 (ET)
United States

FT: 18–18 ET: 5–4

| 9 November 1981 | Paraguay | 29–17 | Chile |

| 10 November 1981 | Argentina | 36–14 | Paraguay |

| 10 November 1981 | United States | 51–8 | Chile |

| 11 November 1981 | Argentina | 26–15 | Chile |

| 11 November 1981 | United States | 48–15 | Paraguay |

=== Group B ===
| Pos | Team | Pld | W | D | L | GF | GA | GD | Pts | Qualification |
|---|---|---|---|---|---|---|---|---|---|---|
| 1 | Cuba | 2 | 2 | 0 | 0 | 68 | 45 | +23 | 4 | Semifinals |
| 2 | Brazil | 2 | 1 | 0 | 1 | 51 | 49 | +2 | 2 | Semifinals |
| 3 | Mexico | 2 | 0 | 0 | 2 | 40 | 65 | −25 | 0 | |

Source: Todor66
Rules for classification: 1) points; 2) head-to-head points; 3) head-to-head goal difference; 4) head-to-head number of goals scored; 5) goal difference.

| 9 November 1981 | Brazil | 29–17 | Mexico |
| 9 November 1981 | | (14–6) |

| 10 November 1981 | Cuba | 36–23 | Mexico |

| 11 November 1981 | Cuba | 32–22 | Brazil |
| 11 November 1981 | | (15–12) |

== Knockout stage ==
=== Bracket ===
Semi-finals
13 November
Argentina | 30
Brazil (ET) | 35
13 November
Cuba | 35
United States | 29

Final
14 November
Brazil | 20
Cuba | 34
Third place
14 November
Argentina | 22
United States | 25

Fifth place bracket

5–7th place semifinals
13 November
Mexico | 35
Chile | 12

Fifth place game
14 November
Mexico | 36
Paraguay | 21

=== 5–7th place semifinal ===
| 13 November 1981 | Mexico | 31–12 | Chile |

=== Semifinals ===
13 November 1981
Brazil
35–30 (ET)
Argentina

FT: 22–22 ET: 5–5, 8–3

| 13 November 1981 | Cuba | 35–29 | United States |

=== Fifth place game ===
| 14 November 1981 | Mexico | 36–21 | Paraguay |

=== Third place game ===
| 14 November 1981 | United States | 25–22 | Argentina |

=== Final ===
| 14 November 1981 | Cuba | 34–20 | Brazil |

== Final ranking ==
| Qualified for the 1982 World Championship |

| Rank | Team |
|---|---|
| Gold medal | Cuba |
| Silver medal | Brazil |
| Bronze medal | United States |
| 4 | Argentina |
| 5 | Mexico |
| 6 | Paraguay |
| 7 | Chile |
