= Handball at the Central American Games =

Handball has been a Central American Games event since 2001 in Guatemala City, Guatemala. In addition to crowning the handball champions of the Central American Games, the tournament also serves as a qualifying tournament for the Central American and Caribbean Games.

== Men ==
=== Summary ===
| Year | Host | Final | | | Third place match | | |
| Year | Host | Champion | Score | Runner-up | Third place | Score | Fourth place |
|---|---|---|---|---|---|---|---|
| 2001; Details | Guatemala City | Guatemala | No playoffs | Honduras | Costa Rica | No playoffs | El Salvador |
| 2010; Details | Panama City | Honduras | No playoffs | El Salvador | Nicaragua | No playoffs | Costa Rica |
| 2013; Details | (Costa Rica); San Jose | Nicaragua | No playoffs | Guatemala | Costa Rica | No playoffs | Honduras |
| 2017; Details | (Nicaragua); Managua | Guatemala | No playoffs | Costa Rica | Honduras | No playoffs | Nicaragua |

=== Medal table ===
| Rank | Nation | Gold | Silver | Bronze | Total |
|---|---|---|---|---|---|
| 1 | Guatemala | 2 | 1 | 0 | 3 |
| 2 | Honduras | 1 | 1 | 1 | 3 |
| 3 | Nicaragua | 1 | 0 | 1 | 2 |
| 4 | Costa Rica | 0 | 1 | 2 | 3 |
| 5 | El Salvador | 0 | 1 | 0 | 1 |
| Totals (5 entries) | | 4 | 4 | 4 | 12 |

=== Participating nations ===
| Nation | (Guatemala) 2001 | (Panama) 2010 | (Costa Rica) 2013 | (Nicaragua) 2017 | Years |
|---|---|---|---|---|---|
| Costa Rica | 3rd | 4th | 3rd | 2nd | 4 |
| El Salvador | 4th | 2nd | 5th | 5th | 4 |
| Guatemala | 1st | - | 2nd | 1st | 3 |
| Honduras | 2nd | 1st | 4th | 3rd | 4 |
| Nicaragua | - | 3rd | 1st | 4th | 3 |
| Panama | - | 5th | - | - | 1 |
| Total | 4 | 5 | 5 | 5 | |

== Women ==
=== Summary ===
| Year | Host | Final | | | Third place match | | |
| Year | Host | Champion | Score | Runner-up | Third place | Score | Fourth place |
|---|---|---|---|---|---|---|---|
| 2001; Details | Guatemala City | Guatemala | No playoffs | Costa Rica | Honduras | No playoffs | El Salvador |
| 2010; Details | Panama City | El Salvador | No playoffs | Costa Rica | Honduras | | |
| 2013; Details | (Costa Rica); San Jose | Costa Rica | No playoffs | Guatemala | Nicaragua | No playoffs | El Salvador |
| 2017; Details | (Nicaragua); Managua | Guatemala | 24–21 | Costa Rica | Nicaragua | 33–24 | El Salvador |

=== Medal table ===
| Rank | Nation | Gold | Silver | Bronze | Total |
|---|---|---|---|---|---|
| 1 | Guatemala | 2 | 1 | 0 | 3 |
| 2 | Costa Rica | 1 | 3 | 0 | 4 |
| 3 | El Salvador | 1 | 0 | 0 | 1 |
| 4 | Honduras | 0 | 0 | 2 | 2 |
| 4 | Nicaragua | 0 | 0 | 2 | 2 |
| Totals (5 entries) | | 4 | 4 | 4 | 12 |

=== Participating nations ===
| Nation | (Guatemala) 2001 | (Panama) 2010 | (Costa Rica) 2013 | (Nicaragua) 2017 | Years |
|---|---|---|---|---|---|
| Costa Rica | 2nd | 2nd | 1st | 2nd | 4 |
| El Salvador | 4th | 1st | 4th | 4th | 4 |
| Guatemala | 1st | - | 2nd | 1st | 3 |
| Honduras | 3rd | 3rd | 5th | - | 3 |
| Nicaragua | - | - | 3rd | 3rd | 2 |
| Total | 4 | 3 | 5 | 4 | |
