= Larissa Araújo =

Brazilian handball player (born 1992)

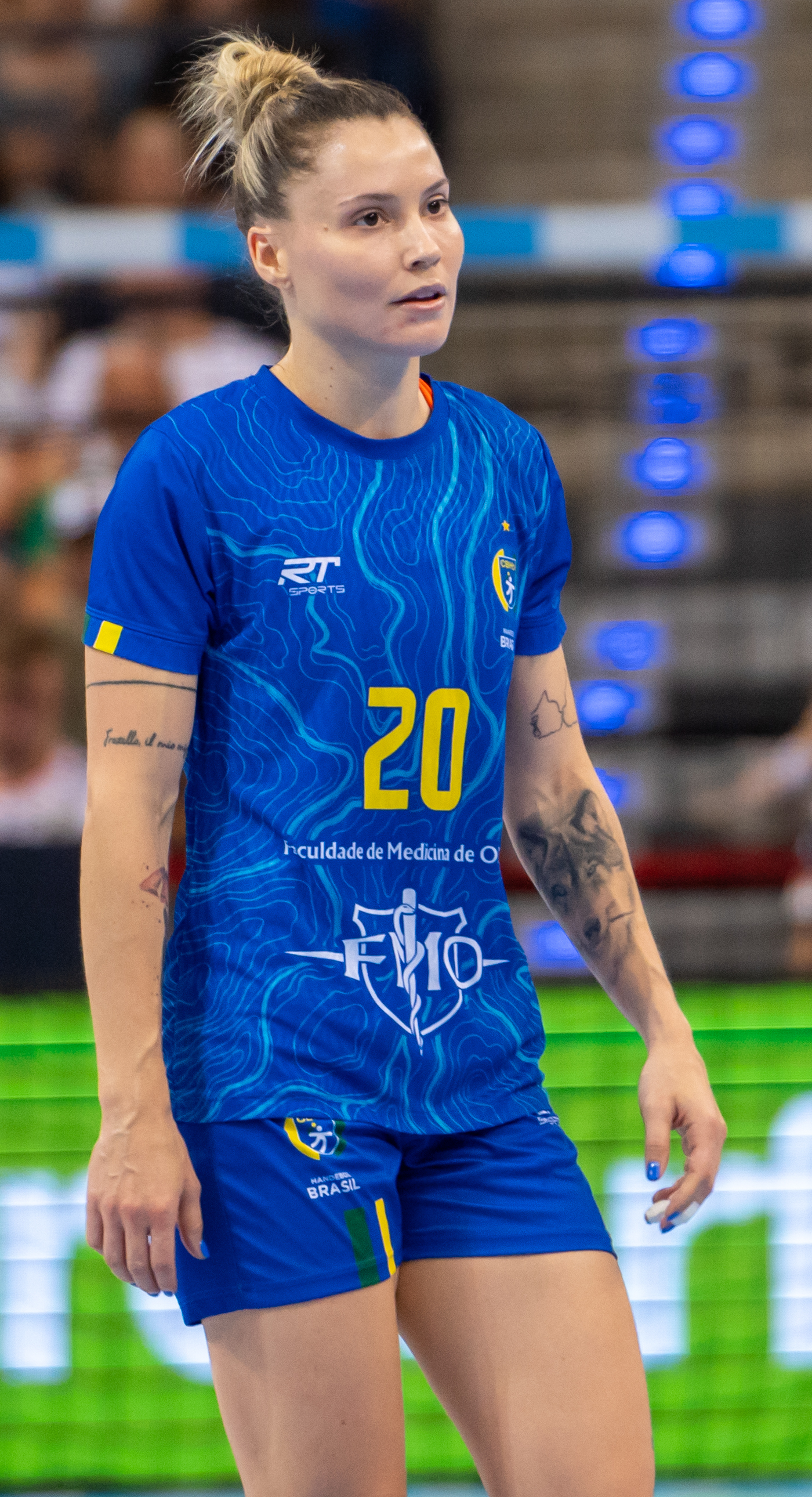
- Araújo in 2024

Personal information
- Full name: Larissa Fais Munhoz Araújo
- Born: 1 July 1992 (age 34) Curitiba, Brazil
- Height: 1.67 m (5 ft 6 in)

Sport
- Sport: Handball
- Position: Left wing
- Current club: CSM Corona Brașov
- Number: 22

Senior clubs
- Years: Team
- –2016: UnC Concórdia
- 2016–2017: Érdi VSE
- 2017–2019: Măgura Cisnădie
- 2019–2020: Universitatea Cluj-Napoca
- 2020–2021: Minaur Baia Mare
- 2021–2024: HC Dunărea Brăila
- 2024–: CSM Corona Brașov
National team
Years	Team	Apps	(Gls)
–	Brazil	107	(239)
Medal record
Pan American Games
Gold medal – first place	2019 Lima	Team
Gold medal – first place	2023 Santiago	Team
Pan American Championship
Gold medal – first place	2015 Cuba
Gold medal – first place	2017 Argentina
South and Central American Championship
Gold medal – first place	2018 Brazil
Gold medal – first place	2021 Paraguay
Gold medal – first place	2022 Argentina
Youth Olympic Games
Bronze medal – third place	Singapore 2010	Team
- Updated on 13 August 2024

Larissa Fais Munhoz Araújo (born 1 July 1992) is a Brazilian handball player who plays as a left wing for Liga Națională club CSM Corona Brașov and the Brazilian national team. She and the Brazilian team won bronze in girls' handball at the 2010 Summer Youth Olympics. She also represented Brazil at the 2020 Summer Olympics in Tokyo and the 2024 Summer Olympics in Paris.

== Achievements ==
- Liga Națională:
  - Bronze Medalist: 2018
- Nemzeti Bajnokság I:
  - Bronze Medalist: 2017
