= Bruna de Paula =

Brazilian handball player (born 1996)

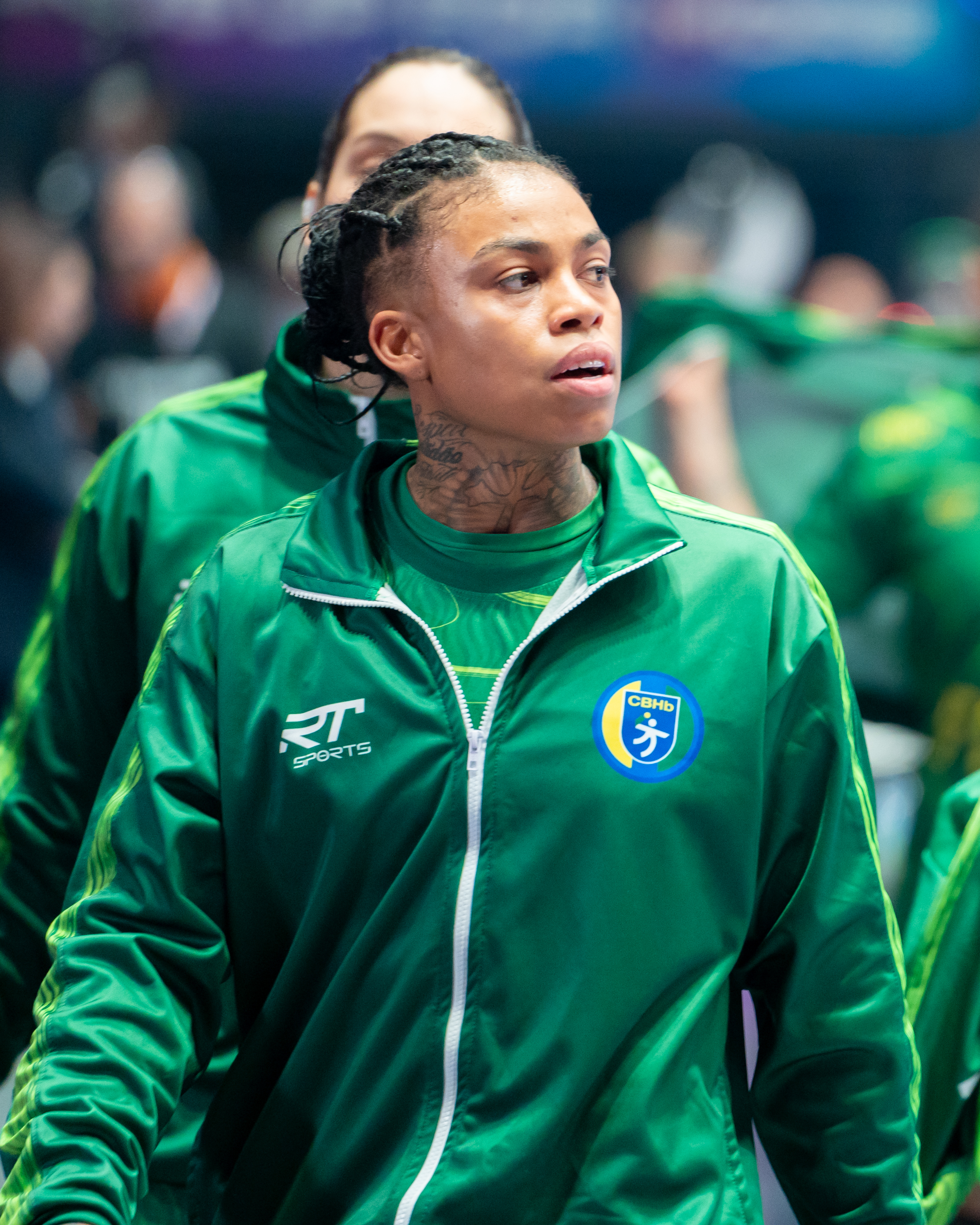
- Bruna de Paula (2025)

Personal information
- Born: 26 September 1996 (age 30) Campestre, Minas Gerais, Brazil
- Height: 1.73 m (5 ft 8 in)

Sport
- Sport: Handball
- Position: Left back
- Current club: Győri ETO KC
- Number: 10

Senior clubs
- Years: Team
- –: Juiz de Fora
- –: Sao Jose dos Campos
- 2016–2020: Fleury Loiret HB
- 2020–2021: Nantes Atlantique
- 2021–2023: Metz Handball
- 2023–: Győri ETO KC
National team
Years	Team	Apps	(Gls)
–	Brazil	48	(141)
Medal record
Pan American Games
Gold medal – first place	2019 Lima	Team
Gold medal – first place	2023 Santiago	Team
Pan American Championship
Gold medal – first place	2017 Argentina
South and Central American Championship
Gold medal – first place	2018 Brazil
Gold medal – first place	2022 Argentina
Gold medal – first place	2024 Brazil
South American Games
Gold medal – first place	2018 Cochabamba	Team
Pan American Junior Championship
Gold medal – first place	2016 Brazil

Bruna Aparecida Almeida de Paula (born 26 September 1996) is a Brazilian professional handball player for Győri ETO KC and the Brazilian national team. She previously played for Metz.

She competed at the 2015 World Women's Handball Championship in Denmark.

== Achievements ==
- EHF Champions League:
  - Gold: 2024, 2025
  - Bronze: 2022
- EHF European League:
  - Gold: 2021

== Individual awards ==
- All-Star centre back of the IHF World Handball Championship: 2025
- MVP of the Pan American Junior Championship: 2016
- Top Scorer of the Junior World Championship: 2016
- Foreign Handballer of the Year in France: 2016/17
- Top Scorer of the International Tournament of Spain: 2018
- Top Scorer of the Intersport Cup: 2019
- MVP and All-Star Team Best Right Back of the French Championship: 2019/20
- MVP of the EHF European League Final Four: 2021
- Top Scorer of the 2022 South and Central American Women's Handball Championship
- MVP of the 2024 Carpathian Trophy

== Personal life ==
She is in a relationship with her teammate Csenge Fodor. With whom she got married in June 2026 in Brazil.
