= Luciana Mendoza =

Argentine handball player

Personal information
- Nationality: Argentinian
- Born: 14 March 1990 (age 36) Lanús, Argentina
- Height: 1.70 m (5 ft 7 in)

Sport
- Sport: Handball
- Position: Right back
- Current club: Achenheim Truchtersheim Handball
- Number: 7

Senior clubs
- Years: Team
- –: Blumenau
- 2015–2016: Cleba León BM
- 2016–2018: CB Atlético Guardés
- 2018–: Achenheim Truchtersheim Handball
National team
| Years | Team | Apps | (Gls) |
| – | Argentina | 166 | (562) |
Medal record
Pan American Games
| Silver medal – second place | 2011 Guadalajara | Team |
| Silver medal – second place | 2015 Toronto | Team |
| Silver medal – second place | 2019 Lima | Team |
| Silver medal – second place | 2023 Santiago | Team |
Pan American Championship
| Silver medal – second place | 2017 Argentina |
| Bronze medal – third place | 2015 Cuba |
South and Central American Championship
| Silver medal – second place | 2018 Brazil |
| Silver medal – second place | 2021 Paraguay |
| Silver medal – second place | 2022 Argentina |
South American Games
| Silver medal – second place | 2018 Cochabamba | Team |

Luciana Mendoza (born 14 March 1990) is an Argentine handball player for Achenheim Truchtersheim Handball and the Argentina women's national handball team.

She defended Argentina at the 2011 World Women's Handball Championship in Brazil.
