= Leticia Martínez =

Paraguayan handball player (born 1988)

Personal information
- Full name: Leticia Ramona Martínez Forcado
- Nationality: Paraguayan
- Born: 21 December 1988 (age 37)
- Height: 1.75 m (5 ft 9 in)

Sport
- Sport: Handball
- Position: Right Wing
- Current club: San Lorenzo BM
National team
Years	Team	Apps	(Gls)
–	Paraguay	151	(48)
Medal record
Handball
South and Central American Championship
Bronze medal – third place	2021 Paraguay
Bolivarian Games
Gold medal – first place	2017 Santa Marta
Central American Championship
Gold medal – first place	2023 Guatemala
Beach handball
Bolivarian Beach Games
Silver medal – second place	2016 Iquique	Team

Leticia Ramona Martínez Forcado (born 21 December 1988) is a Paraguayan handball player for San Lorenzo BM and the Paraguay national team.

She was selected to represent Paraguay at the 2017 World Women's Handball Championship.
