= 2023 Central American Women's Handball Championship =

Tournament details
- Host country: Nicaragua
- City: 1
- Venue: 1 (in 1 host city)
- Dates: 28 February – 4 March
- Teams: 6 (from 1 confederation)

Final positions
- Champions: Paraguay (1st title)
- Runners-up: Chile
- Third place: Nicaragua
- Fourth place: Costa Rica

Tournament statistics
- Matches played: 15
- Goals scored: 845 (56.33 per match)
- Attendance: 2,514 (168 per match)

The 2023 Central American Women's Handball Championship took place in Managua, Nicaragua, from 28 February to 4 March 2023. It acted as a qualifying tournament for the 2023 Central American and Caribbean Games and the 2024 South and Central American Women's Handball Championship.

== Results ==
Pos	Team	Pld	W	D	L	GF	GA	GD	Pts	Qualification
1	Paraguay (Note: Chile and Paraguay are not members of Centro Caribe Sports and therefore not eligible to participate at the 2023 Central American and Caribbean Games.)	5	5	0	0	202	91	+111	10	2023 World Championship
2	Chile	5	4	0	1	173	110	+63	8	2023 World Championship
3	Nicaragua (H)	5	3	0	2	174	163	+11	6	2023 Central American and Caribbean Games and 2024 South and Central American Championship
4	Costa Rica	5	2	0	3	107	134	−27	4	2023 Central American and Caribbean Games
5	El Salvador	5	1	0	4	92	168	−76	2	Qualified as host for the 2023 Central American and Caribbean Games
6	Guatemala	5	0	0	5	97	179	−82	0	

Source: SCAHC
Rules for classification: 1) Points; 2) Head-to-head points; 3) Head-to-head goal difference; 4) Head-to-head goals scored; 5) Goal difference; 6) Goals scored; 7) Draw.
(H) Hosts

== Round robin ==
All times are local (UTC−06:00).

28 February 2023; 15:00	Paraguay	35–13	Costa Rica	Instituto Nicaragüense de Deportes, Managua; Attendance: 50; Referees: B. Correa, R. Correa (BRA)
28 February 2023; 15:00	Feschenko 7	(17–5)	Garro, Muñoz 2	Instituto Nicaragüense de Deportes, Managua; Attendance: 50; Referees: B. Correa, R. Correa (BRA)
28 February 2023; 15:00	1× (yellow card) 1× (suspension)	Report	1× (yellow card) 2× (suspension)	Instituto Nicaragüense de Deportes, Managua; Attendance: 50; Referees: B. Correa, R. Correa (BRA)

28 February 2023; 17:00	Chile	37–20	Guatemala	Instituto Nicaragüense de Deportes, Managua; Attendance: 60; Referees: Lemes, Sosa (URU)
28 February 2023; 17:00	Muller 6	(19–7)	Lopez 6	Instituto Nicaragüense de Deportes, Managua; Attendance: 60; Referees: Lemes, Sosa (URU)
28 February 2023; 17:00	1× (yellow card) 1× (suspension)	Report	1× (yellow card) 3× (suspension)	Instituto Nicaragüense de Deportes, Managua; Attendance: 60; Referees: Lemes, Sosa (URU)

28 February 2023; 20:00	Nicaragua	39–18	El Salvador	Instituto Nicaragüense de Deportes, Managua; Attendance: 400; Referees: Castillo, Alvarado (CRC)
28 February 2023; 20:00	Suarez 8	(22–7)	Saz 6	Instituto Nicaragüense de Deportes, Managua; Attendance: 400; Referees: Castillo, Alvarado (CRC)
28 February 2023; 20:00	2× (suspension)	Report	1× (suspension)	Instituto Nicaragüense de Deportes, Managua; Attendance: 400; Referees: Castillo, Alvarado (CRC)

1 March 2023; 15:00	El Salvador	13–37	Chile	Instituto Nicaragüense de Deportes, Managua; Attendance: 30; Referees: Pagoaga, Zambrano (HON)
1 March 2023; 15:00	Saz 4	(7–16)	Galvez 7	Instituto Nicaragüense de Deportes, Managua; Attendance: 30; Referees: Pagoaga, Zambrano (HON)
1 March 2023; 15:00	1× (yellow card)	Report		Instituto Nicaragüense de Deportes, Managua; Attendance: 30; Referees: Pagoaga, Zambrano (HON)

1 March 2023; 17:00	Costa Rica	24–14	Guatemala	Instituto Nicaragüense de Deportes, Managua; Attendance: 35; Referees: B. Correa, R. Correa
1 March 2023; 17:00	Muñoz 9	(13–5)	Uziar 4	Instituto Nicaragüense de Deportes, Managua; Attendance: 35; Referees: B. Correa, R. Correa
1 March 2023; 17:00	1× (yellow card) 7× (suspension) 1× (red card)	Report	1× (yellow card) 3× (suspension)	Instituto Nicaragüense de Deportes, Managua; Attendance: 35; Referees: B. Correa, R. Correa

1 March 2023; 19:00	Paraguay	44–28	Nicaragua	Instituto Nicaragüense de Deportes, Managua; Attendance: 320; Referees: Lemes, Sosa (URU)
1 March 2023; 19:00	Feschenko 7	(23–10)	Tecero 6	Instituto Nicaragüense de Deportes, Managua; Attendance: 320; Referees: Lemes, Sosa (URU)
1 March 2023; 19:00	1× (yellow card) 6× (suspension)	Report	3× (suspension)	Instituto Nicaragüense de Deportes, Managua; Attendance: 320; Referees: Lemes, Sosa (URU)

2 March 2023; 15:00	Paraguay	43–15	El Salvador	Instituto Nicaragüense de Deportes, Managua; Attendance: 25; Referees: Castillo, Alvarado (CRC)
2 March 2023; 15:00	Velasquez 9	(20–9)	Reyes 4	Instituto Nicaragüense de Deportes, Managua; Attendance: 25; Referees: Castillo, Alvarado (CRC)
2 March 2023; 15:00		Report	1× (yellow card) 2× (suspension)	Instituto Nicaragüense de Deportes, Managua; Attendance: 25; Referees: Castillo, Alvarado (CRC)

2 March 2023; 17:00	Chile	35–12	Costa Rica	Instituto Nicaragüense de Deportes, Managua; Attendance: 16; Referees: Lemes, Sosa (URU)
2 March 2023; 17:00	Muller 11	(19–7)	three players 3	Instituto Nicaragüense de Deportes, Managua; Attendance: 16; Referees: Lemes, Sosa (URU)
2 March 2023; 17:00	1× (yellow card) 2× (suspension)	Report	5× (suspension)	Instituto Nicaragüense de Deportes, Managua; Attendance: 16; Referees: Lemes, Sosa (URU)

2 March 2023; 19:00	Guatemala	26–43	Nicaragua	Instituto Nicaragüense de Deportes, Managua; Attendance: 350; Referees: Pagoaga, Zambrano (HON)
2 March 2023; 19:00	Maldonado, Uziar 5	(16–18)	Ortega 12	Instituto Nicaragüense de Deportes, Managua; Attendance: 350; Referees: Pagoaga, Zambrano (HON)
2 March 2023; 19:00	5× (suspension)	Report	1× (suspension)	Instituto Nicaragüense de Deportes, Managua; Attendance: 350; Referees: Pagoaga, Zambrano (HON)

3 March 2023; 15:00	Costa Rica	30–20	El Salvador	Instituto Nicaragüense de Deportes, Managua; Attendance: 35; Referees: Pagoaga, Zambrano (HON)
3 March 2023; 15:00	Ugalde 7	(11–11)	Alvarenga, De Leon 5	Instituto Nicaragüense de Deportes, Managua; Attendance: 35; Referees: Pagoaga, Zambrano (HON)
3 March 2023; 15:00	2× (yellow card) 3× (suspension)	Report	4× (suspension) 1× (red card)	Instituto Nicaragüense de Deportes, Managua; Attendance: 35; Referees: Pagoaga, Zambrano (HON)

3 March 2023; 17:00	Paraguay	49–18	Guatemala	Instituto Nicaragüense de Deportes, Managua; Attendance: 18; Referees: Castillo, Alvarado (CRC)
3 March 2023; 17:00	Fernández 8	(28–4)	Herrera, Uziar 4	Instituto Nicaragüense de Deportes, Managua; Attendance: 18; Referees: Castillo, Alvarado (CRC)
3 March 2023; 17:00	1× (yellow card) 2× (suspension)	Report	4× (suspension)	Instituto Nicaragüense de Deportes, Managua; Attendance: 18; Referees: Castillo, Alvarado (CRC)

3 March 2023; 19:00	Nicaragua	34–47	Chile	Instituto Nicaragüense de Deportes, Managua; Attendance: 500; Referees: B. Correa, R. Correa (BRA)
3 March 2023; 19:00	Cardenas 7	(14–23)	Muller 9	Instituto Nicaragüense de Deportes, Managua; Attendance: 500; Referees: B. Correa, R. Correa (BRA)
3 March 2023; 19:00	4× (suspension)	Report	1× (yellow card) 5× (suspension)	Instituto Nicaragüense de Deportes, Managua; Attendance: 500; Referees: B. Correa, R. Correa (BRA)

4 March 2023; 15:00	El Salvador	26–19	Guatemala	Instituto Nicaragüense de Deportes, Managua; Attendance: 25; Referees: Pagoaga, Zambrano (HON)
4 March 2023; 15:00	Saz 8	(13–9)	Urizar 9	Instituto Nicaragüense de Deportes, Managua; Attendance: 25; Referees: Pagoaga, Zambrano (HON)
4 March 2023; 15:00	1× (yellow card) 2× (suspension)	Report	7× (suspension) 1× (red card)	Instituto Nicaragüense de Deportes, Managua; Attendance: 25; Referees: Pagoaga, Zambrano (HON)

4 March 2023; 17:00	Nicaragua	30–28	Costa Rica	Instituto Nicaragüense de Deportes, Managua; Attendance: 350; Referees: B. Correa, R. Correa (BRA)
4 March 2023; 17:00	Cardenas, Tercero 5	(14–13)	V. Muñoz 9	Instituto Nicaragüense de Deportes, Managua; Attendance: 350; Referees: B. Correa, R. Correa (BRA)
4 March 2023; 17:00	1× (yellow card) 4× (suspension)	Report	1× (yellow card) 5× (suspension)	Instituto Nicaragüense de Deportes, Managua; Attendance: 350; Referees: B. Correa, R. Correa (BRA)

4 March 2023; 19:00	Chile	17–31	Paraguay	Instituto Nicaragüense de Deportes, Managua; Attendance: 300; Referees: Lemes, Sosa (URU)
4 March 2023; 19:00	Lovera 5	(6–16)	Mendoza, Velasquez 6	Instituto Nicaragüense de Deportes, Managua; Attendance: 300; Referees: Lemes, Sosa (URU)
4 March 2023; 19:00	1× (yellow card) 3× (suspension)	Report	1× (yellow card) 4× (suspension)	Instituto Nicaragüense de Deportes, Managua; Attendance: 300; Referees: Lemes, Sosa (URU)

== Team champion roster ==
2023 Central American Women's Champions

Paraguay
First title

Team roster: Ada Misknisch, Fernanda Insfrán, Jazmín Mendoza, Karina dos Santos, Camila Feschenko, Delyne Leiva, Ana Macke, María Paula Fernández, Belinda Bobadilla, Ana Cristaldo, Kiara Vergara, Alejandra Velasquez, Milagros Samaniego, Maria Machuca, Ana Oliveira, Leticia Martínez
Head coach: Marizza Faria.
