= Marizza Faría =

Paraguayan handball player (born 1983)

Personal information
- Full name: Marizza Alejandra Faría Servin
- Born: 20 August 1983 (age 43) Asunción, Paraguay
- Height: 1.67 m (5 ft 6 in)

Sport
- Sport: Handball
- Position: Centre back
- Current club: BM La Calzada
- Number: 9

Senior clubs
- Years: Team
- –: Dep Recoleta
- –: Cerro Porteño
- –: Dep San José
- 2007-2010: BM Monóvar
- 2010-2012: BM Elda Prestigio
- 2012-2014: CB Mar Alicante
- 2014-2015: CBM Elche Mustang
- 2015-2023: BM La Calzada
National team
Years	Team	Apps	(Gls)
–	Paraguay	194	(280)

Teams managed
- 2022–: Paraguay
- 2023–2025: BM La Calzada (assistant)
Medal record
Handball
Pan American Championship
Bronze medal – third place	2017 Argentina
South and Central American Championship
Bronze medal – third place	2018 Brazil
Bronze medal – third place	2021 Paraguay
Bolivarian Games
Gold medal – first place	2013 Trujillo	Team
Pan American Games
Bronze medal – third place	2023 Santiago	Coach
Beach handball
Bolivarian Beach Games
Silver medal – second place	2016 Iquique	Team

Marizza Alejandra Faría Servin (born 20 August 1983) is a Paraguayan handball coach and former player, who played for the Paraguay national team. She is currently the coach of the Paraguay women's handball team.

She is considered the best Paraguayan player of all time, and led them to the first 4 participations in the IHF World Women's Handball Championship as a player, as well as the fifth and sixth as a coach.

She represented Paraguay at the 2007 World Women's Handball Championship, where Paraguay finished 23rd. Then again 2013 World Women's Handball Championship in Serbia, where the Paraguayan team placed 21st. The third world Championship was the 2017 World Women's Handball Championship, where they finished 21st once again. Her last World Championship as a player was the 2021 World Women's Handball Championship, where they finished 29th (of 32).

In 2021 she was the first handballer to play a professional league match alongside her daughter, Yeruti Faría in the spanish handball league

She retired from playing after the 2022-23 season.

In 2022 she became the head coach of the Paraguay women's national handball team. She led the team to their 5th and 6th World Championships at the 2023 and 2025 World Women's Handball Championships. She guided the team to a bronze medal at the 2023 Pan American Games.

== Individual awards ==
- 2017 Pan American Women's Handball Championship: All Star Team Playmaker
