= María Paula Fernández =

Paraguayan handball player (born 1998)

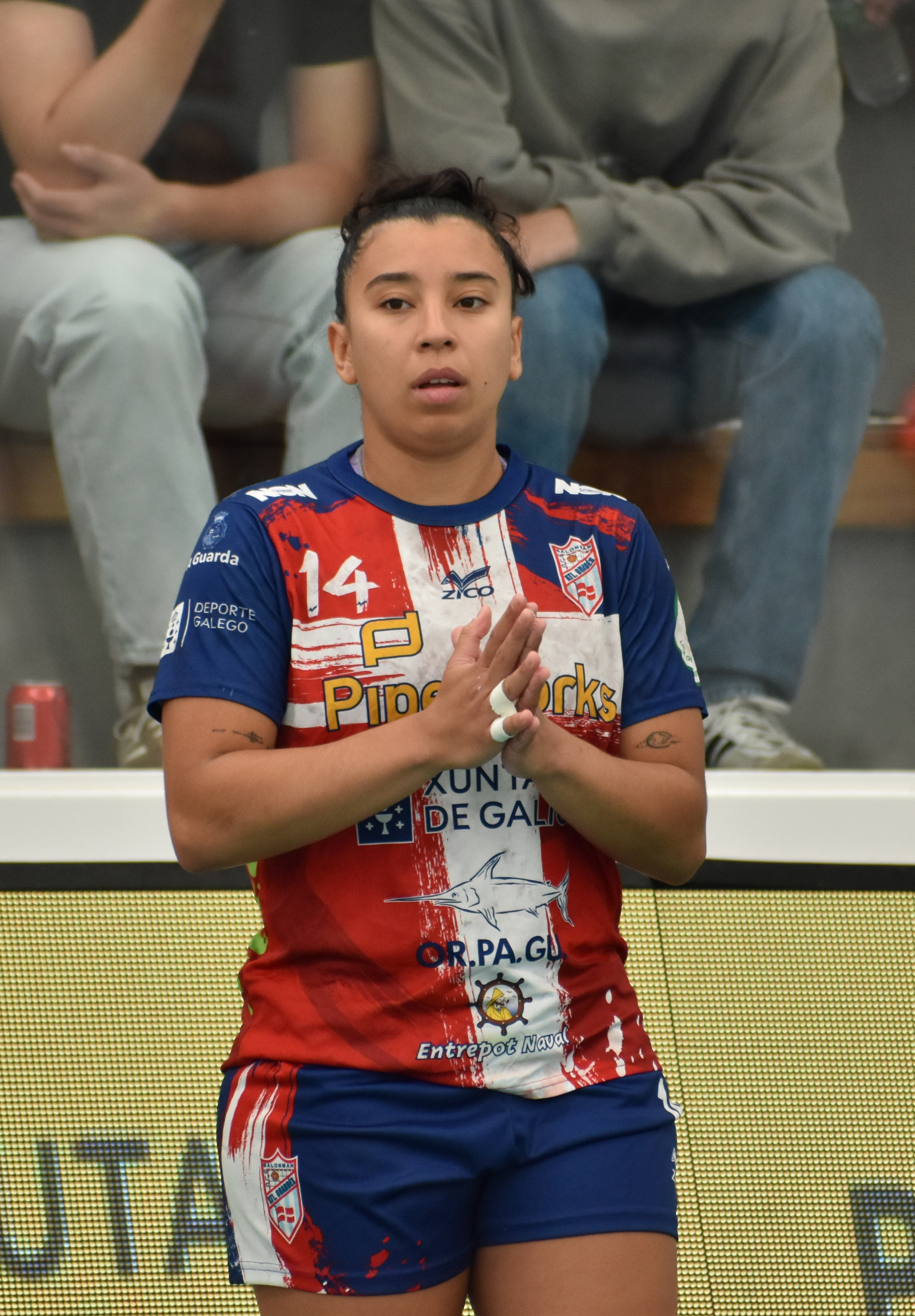

Personal information
- Full name: María Paula Fernández Estigarribia
- Nationality: Paraguayan
- Born: 30 August 1998 (age 28)
- Height: 1.54 m (5 ft 1 in)

Sport
- Sport: Handball
- Position: Left back
- Current club: CB Zonzamas

Senior clubs
- Years: Team
- –: Club Balonmano Atlético Guardés
- –: CB Zonzamas
National team
| Years | Team | Apps | (Gls) |
| – | Paraguay | 125 | (30) |
Medal record
Pan American Games
| Bronze medal – third place | 2023 Santiago | Team |
Pan American Championship
| Bronze medal – third place | 2017 Argentina |
South and Central American Championship
| Bronze medal – third place | 2018 Brazil |
| Bronze medal – third place | 2021 Paraguay |
Bolivarian Games
| Gold medal – first place | 2017 Santa Marta | Team |
| Gold medal – first place | 2022 Valledupar | Team |
Central American Championship
| Gold medal – first place | 2023 Guatemala |
Junior Pan American Games
| Silver medal – second place | 2021 Cali | Team |
Pan American Junior Championship
| Bronze medal – third place | 2018 Brazil |
Pan American Youth Championship
| Silver medal – second place | 2016 Chile |
Beach Handball
South American Beach Games
| Bronze medal – third place | 2019 Rosario | Team |
South & Central American Championship
| Bronze medal – third place | 2019 Brazil |

María Paula Fernández Estigarribia (born 30 August 1998) is a Paraguayan handball player for Club Balonmano Atlético Guardés and the Paraguay national team.

She was selected to represent Paraguay at the 2017 World Women's Handball Championship.

== Individual Awards and recognitions ==
- 2016 Pan American Women's Youth Handball Championship: All-star team left wing
- 2022 South and Central American Women's Club Handball Championship: All-star team left wing
