= Micaela Casasola =

Argentine handball player

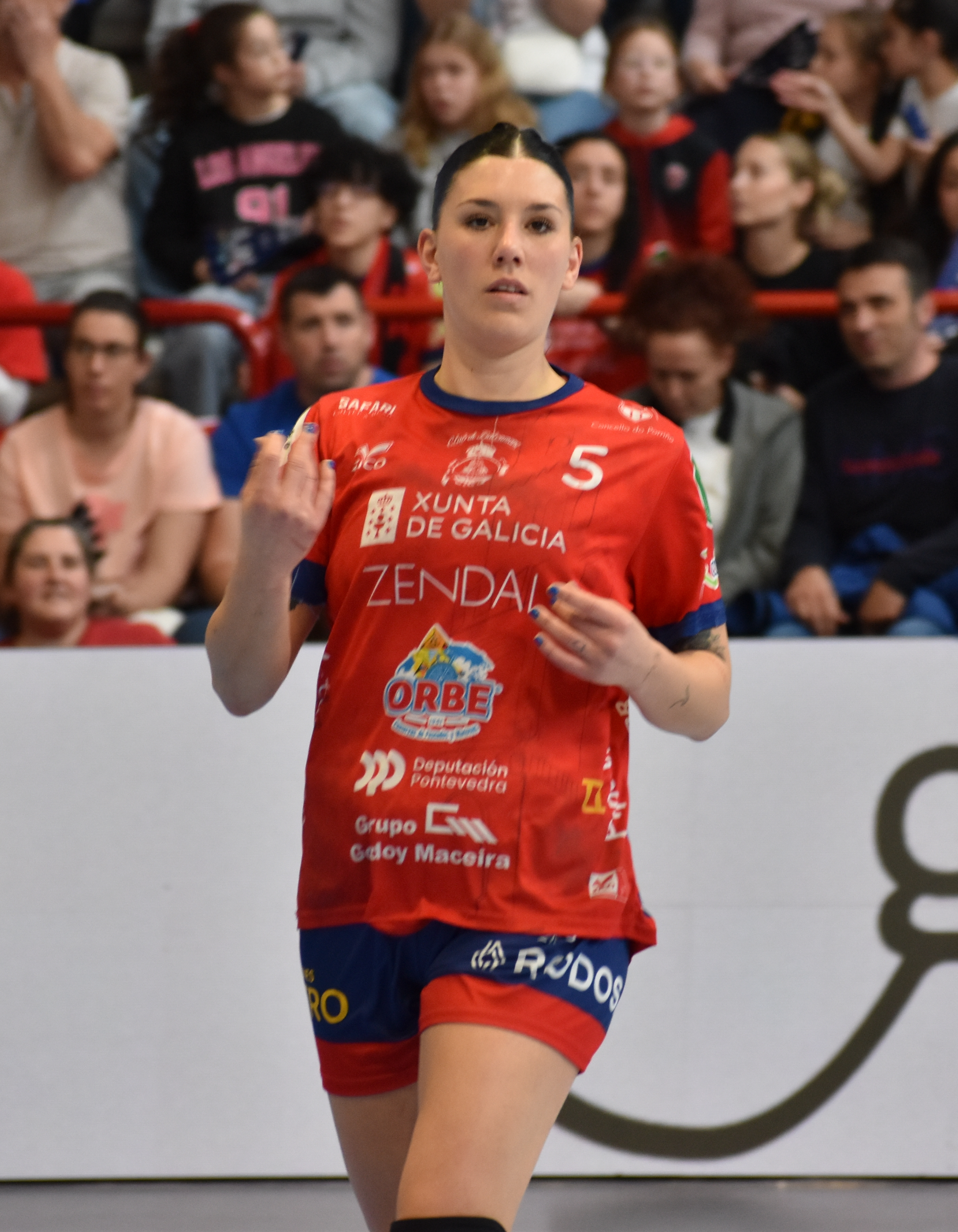

Personal information
- Nationality: Argentine
- Born: 17 March 1997 (age 29) Buenos Aires, Argentina
- Height: 1.75 m (5 ft 9 in)

Sport
- Sport: Handball
- Position: Left back
- Current club: Club Balonmano Porriño
- Number: 5

Senior clubs
- Years: Team
- 2013–2015: Club Atlético Vélez Sarsfield
- 2015: Thames Handball Club
- 2015–2021: Club Atlético Vélez Sarsfield
- 2021–2025: Club Balonmano Porriño
- 2025–: CD Beti Onak
National team
Years	Team	Apps	(Gls)
2016–	Argentina	102	(226)
Medal record
Pan American Games
Silver medal – second place	2019 Lima	Team
Silver medal – second place	2023 Santiago	Team
Pan American Championship
Silver medal – second place	2017 Argentina
South and Central American Championship
Silver medal – second place	2018 Brazil
Silver medal – second place	2021 Paraguay
Silver medal – second place	2022 Argentina
Silver medal – second place	2024 Brazil
South American Games
Silver medal – second place	2018 Cochabamba	Team
Pan American Junior Championship
Silver medal – second place	2016 Brazil
- Updated on 12 December 2025

Micaela Casasola (born 17 March 1997) is an Argentine handball player for Spanish club CD Beti Onak and the Argentine national team.

She competed as a junior at the 2014 IHF Women's Junior World Championship in Mazedonia.

== Club career ==
Micaela started at Club Atlético Vélez Sarsfield as a junior and after a short stint in England returned to Vélez Sarsfield for another 4 years before she joined Spanish Club Club Balonmano Porriño. In 2025 she joined CD Beti Onak.

== International career ==
In January 2015, Micaela joined the English Thames Handball Club for a period of 3 months to further her understanding of English and to gain experience in a foreign handball league.

== Personal life ==
Older brother Tiago Casasola is an Argentine football player, who plays for Italian B club Trapani and the Argentina national under-20 football team after a short stint at English club. Fulham F.C.
