= Central American Handball Championship =

The Central American Handball Championship is the official competition for Men's and Women's national handball teams of Central America. In addition to crowning the Central American champions, the tournament also serves as a qualifying tournament for the Pan American Handball Championship.

== Men ==
=== Summary ===
Year	Host	Final			Third place match		
Year	Host	Champion	Score	Runner-up	Third place	Score	Fourth place
2013; Details (de)	(El Salvador); San Salvador	Guatemala	No playoffs	Costa Rica	Nicaragua	No playoffs	El Salvador
2015; Details	(Costa Rica); Cartago	Guatemala	No playoffs	Costa Rica	Honduras	No playoffs	El Salvador
2017; Details (de)	Ciudad de Guatemala	Guatemala	No playoffs	Costa Rica	Nicaragua	No playoffs	El Salvador
2021; Details	(Honduras); Tegucigalpa	Costa Rica	No playoffs	El Salvador	Honduras	No playoffs	Only three nations
2023; Details	(Nicaragua); Managua	Costa Rica	No playoffs	Nicaragua	Guatemala	No playoffs	Honduras

=== Medal table ===
Rank	Nation	Gold	Silver	Bronze	Total
1	Guatemala	3	0	1	4
2	Costa Rica	2	3	0	5
3	Nicaragua	0	1	2	3
4	El Salvador	0	1	0	1
5	Honduras	0	0	2	2
Totals (5 entries)		5	5	5	15

=== Participating nations ===
Nation	(El Salvador) 2013	(Costa Rica) 2015	(Guatemala) 2017	(Honduras) 2021	(Nicaragua) 2023	Years
Costa Rica	2nd	2nd	2nd	1st	1st	5
El Salvador	4th	4th	4th	2nd	5th	5
Guatemala	1st	1st	1st		3rd	4
Honduras	5th	3rd	5th	3rd	4th	5
Nicaragua	3rd	5th	3rd		2nd	4
Total	5	5	5	3	5	

== Women ==
=== Summary ===
Year	Host	Final			Third place match		
Year	Host	Champion	Score	Runner-up	Third place	Score	Fourth place
2014; Details	(Honduras); Tegucigalpa	Guatemala	No playoffs	Nicaragua	Costa Rica	No playoffs	El Salvador
2016; Details	(Nicaragua); Managua	Guatemala	No playoffs	Nicaragua	Costa Rica	No playoffs	El Salvador
2021; Details	(El Salvador); San Salvador	Nicaragua	No playoffs	Costa Rica	El Salvador	No playoffs	Only three nations
2023; Details	(Nicaragua); Managua	Paraguay	No playoffs	Chile	Nicaragua	No playoffs	Costa Rica

=== Medal table ===
Rank	Nation	Gold	Silver	Bronze	Total
1	Guatemala	2	0	0	2
2	Nicaragua	1	2	1	4
3	Paraguay	1	0	0	1
4	Costa Rica	0	1	2	3
5	Chile	0	1	0	1
6	El Salvador	0	0	1	1
Totals (6 entries)		4	4	4	12

=== Participating nations ===
Nation	(Honduras) 2014	(Nicaragua) 2016	(El Salvador) 2021	(Nicaragua) 2023	Years
Chile				2nd	1
Costa Rica	3rd	3rd	2nd	4th	4
El Salvador	4th	4th	3rd	5th	4
Guatemala	1st	1st		6th	3
Honduras	5th	5th			2
Nicaragua	2nd	2nd	1st	3rd	4
Paraguay				1st	1
Total	5	5	3	6	
