= Giulia Guarieiro =

Brazilian handball player (born 1995)

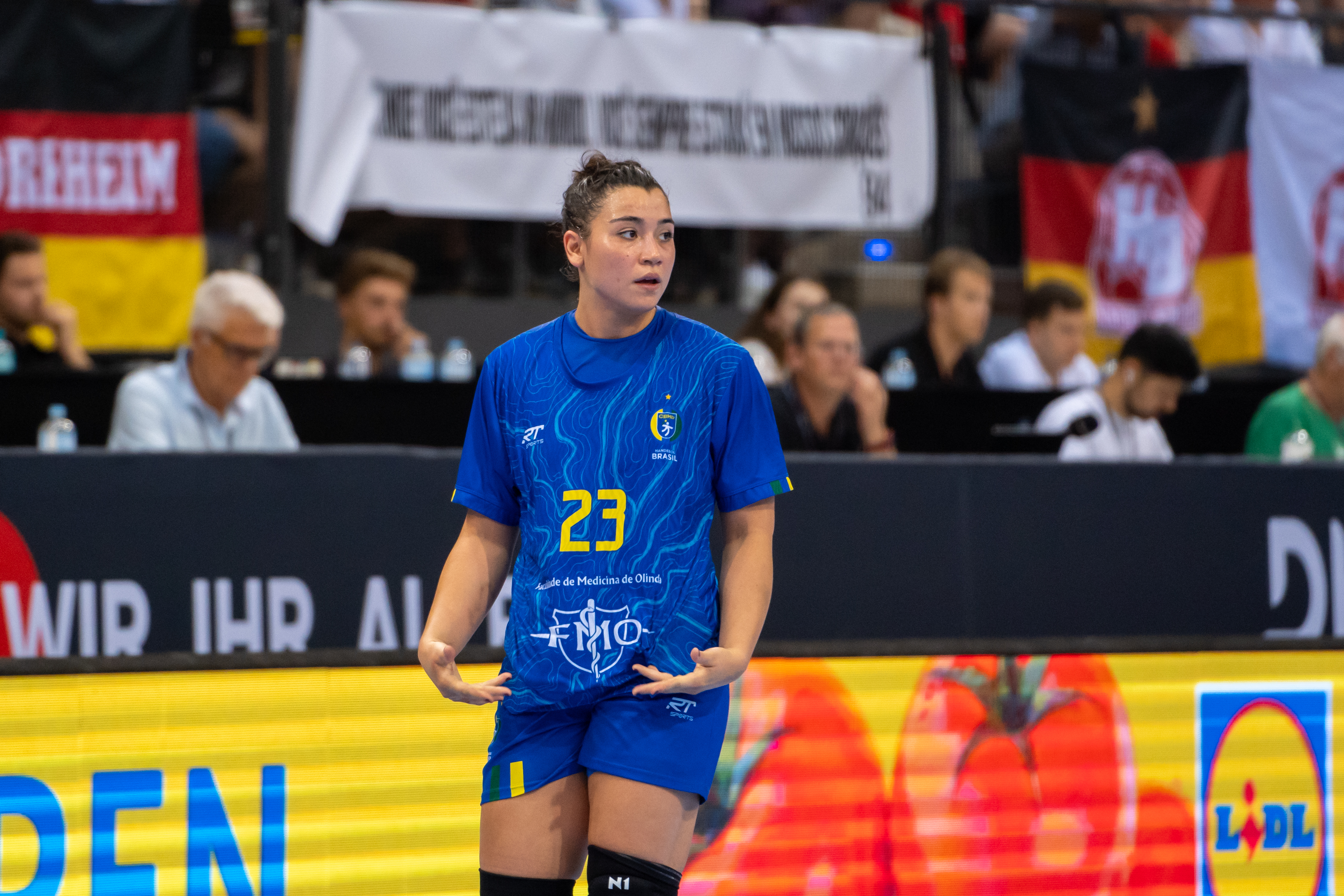
- Guarieiro in 2024

Personal information
- Born: 24 July 1995 (age 31) São Paulo, Brazil
- Height: 1.74 m (5 ft 9 in)

Sport
- Sport: Handball
- Position: Left back
- Current club: Thüringer HC
- Number: 13

Senior clubs
- Years: Team
- 2007–2017: EC Pinheiros
- 2017–2018: BM Bera Bera
- 2018–2022: BM Granollers
- 2022–2023: CS Măgura Cisnădie
- 2023–2025: BM Granollers
- 2025–: Thüringer HC
National team
- Years: Team
- 2020–: Brazil
Medal record
Pan American Games
Gold medal – first place	2023 Santiago	Team
South and Central American Championship
Gold medal – first place	2021 Paraguay
Gold medal – first place	2022 Argentina
Gold medal – first place	2024 Brazil

Giulia Guarieiro (born 24 July 1995) is a Brazilian handball player who plays as a left back for German club Thüringer HC and for Brazil internationally. She made her Olympic debut representing Brazil at the 2020 Summer Olympics.

She was chosen as the best left back of the Liga Guerreras Iberdrola, the highest women's handball competition in Spain, in two consecutive seasons (2018/2019 and 2019/2020). In season 2018/2019 she scored 122 goals. And in season 2019/2020 she scored 92 goals in 16 matches.

She was included in the Brazilian squad in the women's handball competition for the 2020 Summer Olympics.

Giulia Guarieiro was also included in the squad of Brazil in the 25th IHF Women's World Championship played in Spain in December 2021.
