= Adriana Cardoso =

Brazilian handball player (born 1990)

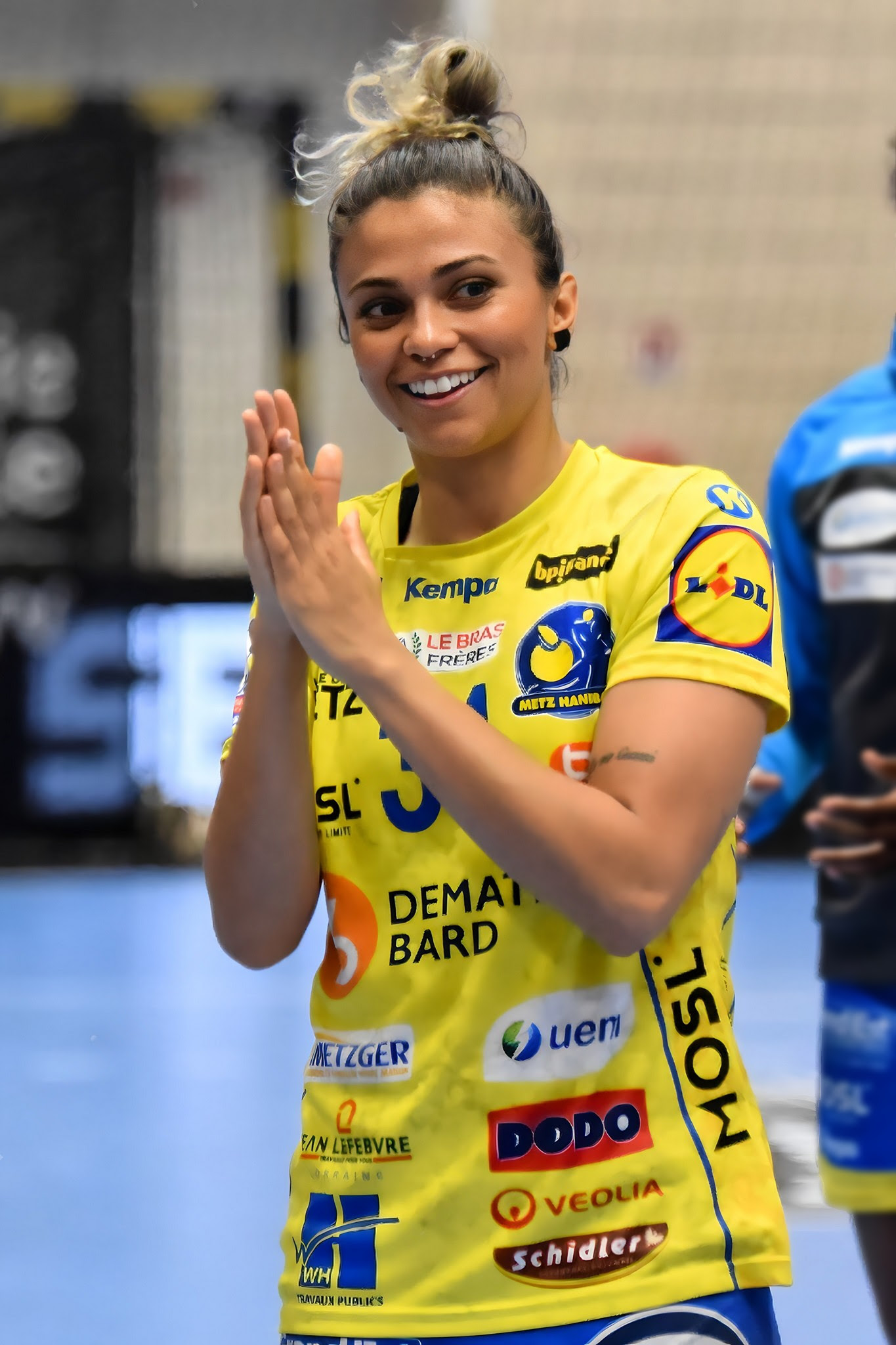
- Adriana Cardoso de Castro (2022)

Personal information
- Full name: Adriana Cardoso de Castro
- Born: 29 October 1990 (age 35) Fortaleza, Brazil
- Height: 1.67 m (5 ft 6 in)

Sport
- Sport: Handball
- Position: Right wing
- Current club: ŽRK Budućnost
- Number: 21

Senior clubs
- Years: Team
- –2011: UCS Caxias do Sul
- 2011–2012: Randers HK
- 2012–2014: BM Bera Bera
- 2014–2015: SVG Celle
- 2015–2017: HSG Blomberg-Lippe
- 2017–2021: BM Bera Bera
- 2021–2022: Metz Handball
- 2022–2024: ŽRK Budućnost
- 2024–: Toulon Saint-Cyr Var Handball
National team
Years	Team	Apps	(Gls)
–	Brazil	85	(360)
Medal record
Pan American Games
Gold medal – first place	2019 Lima	Team
Gold medal – first place	2023 Santiago	Team
South and Central American Championship
Gold medal – first place	2021 Paraguay
Gold medal – first place	2022 Argentina
Gold medal – first place	2024 Brazil
- Updated on 9 September 2024

Adriana Cardoso de Castro (born 29 October 1990) is a Brazilian handballer for the french team Toulon Saint-Cyr Var Handball and the Brazilian national team.

== Achievements ==
- Danish League:
  - Winner: 2011/12
- Spanish División de Honor Femenina:
  - Winner: 2012/13, 2013/14, 2017/18, 2019/20, 2020/21.
- Copa de la Reina de Balonmano:
  - Winner: 2012/13, 2013/14, 2018/19.
  - Runner-up: 2017/18
- 2019 Intersport Cup: Top scorer
- 2022 Intersport Cup: Top scorer
- 2023 Pan American Games: Top scorer
