= Handball at the 2017 Central American Games =

Tournament details
- Host country: Nicaragua
- Venue(s): 1 (in 1 host city)
- Dates: 4–8 December
- Teams: 9 (from 1 confederation)

Final positions
- Champions: Guatemala (men); Guatemala (women)
- Runners-up: Costa Rica (men); Costa Rica (women)
- Third place: Honduras (men); Nicaragua (women)
- Fourth place: Nicaragua (men); El Salvador (women)

Tournament statistics
- Top scorer(s): (Guatemala) Víctor Morales (25 goals) (Guatemala) Militza Lavarreda (29 goals)

The handball competition of the 2017 Central American Games in Managua was held from December 4 to 8 at the Instituto nicaraguense de deportes, in both the men's and women's tournament, three teams qualified for the 2018 Central American and Caribbean Games.

== Participating teams ==
Men

- Costa Rica
- El Salvador
- Guatemala
- Honduras
- Nicaragua

Women

- Costa Rica
- El Salvador
- Guatemala
- Nicaragua

== Medal summary ==
Event	Gold	Silver	Bronze
Men's tournament	Guatemala	Costa Rica	Honduras
Women's tournament	Guatemala	Costa Rica	Nicaragua

== Men's tournament ==
Team	Pld	W	D	L	GF	GA	GD	Pts
Guatemala	4	4	0	0	106	84	22	8
Costa Rica	4	3	0	1	107	82	25	6
Honduras	4	2	0	2	105	97	8	4
Nicaragua	4	1	0	3	101	129	–28	2
El Salvador	4	0	0	4	78	105	–27	0

=== Round Robin ===
All times are local (UTC−06:00).

4 December 2017; 16:00	El Salvador	18–22	Guatemala	Instituto nicaraguense de deportes, Managua; Attendance: 300; Referees: Segura, Valverde
4 December 2017; 16:00	Merino 6	(11–12)	Herrera 8	Instituto nicaraguense de deportes, Managua; Attendance: 300; Referees: Segura, Valverde
4 December 2017; 16:00	2× (yellow card) 2× (suspension)	Report	1× (yellow card) 1× (suspension)	Instituto nicaraguense de deportes, Managua; Attendance: 300; Referees: Segura, Valverde

4 December 2017; 20:00	Honduras	35–24	Nicaragua	Instituto nicaraguense de deportes, Managua; Attendance: 500; Referees: Reyes, Zuñiga
4 December 2017; 20:00	Garcia 9	(16–13)	Lopéz 5	Instituto nicaraguense de deportes, Managua; Attendance: 500; Referees: Reyes, Zuñiga
4 December 2017; 20:00	1× (yellow card) 5× (suspension)	Report	1× (yellow card) 2× (suspension)	Instituto nicaraguense de deportes, Managua; Attendance: 500; Referees: Reyes, Zuñiga

5 December 2017; 16:00	Guatemala	22–18	Costa Rica	Instituto nicaraguense de deportes, Managua; Attendance: 500; Referees: Zuñiga, Reyes
5 December 2017; 16:00	Morales 7	(9–9)	Molina 5	Instituto nicaraguense de deportes, Managua; Attendance: 500; Referees: Zuñiga, Reyes
5 December 2017; 16:00	5× (suspension)	Report	1× (yellow card) 5× (suspension) 1× (red card)	Instituto nicaraguense de deportes, Managua; Attendance: 500; Referees: Zuñiga, Reyes

5 December 2017; 20:00	Nicaragua	29–27	El Salvador	Instituto nicaraguense de deportes, Managua; Attendance: 500; Referees: Paguaga, Cruz
5 December 2017; 20:00	Ruiz 6	(14–10)	Alvarenga 6	Instituto nicaraguense de deportes, Managua; Attendance: 500; Referees: Paguaga, Cruz
5 December 2017; 20:00	2× (suspension)	Report	2× (yellow card) 6× (suspension) 1× (red card)	Instituto nicaraguense de deportes, Managua; Attendance: 500; Referees: Paguaga, Cruz

6 December 2017; 16:00	El Salvador	14–29	Honduras	Instituto nicaraguense de deportes, Managua; Attendance: 200; Referees: Urrutea, Jímenez
6 December 2017; 16:00	Merino, Portillo 3	(8–14)	Montoya 7	Instituto nicaraguense de deportes, Managua; Attendance: 200; Referees: Urrutea, Jímenez
6 December 2017; 16:00	1× (yellow card) 5× (suspension)	Report	2× (yellow card) 4× (suspension)	Instituto nicaraguense de deportes, Managua; Attendance: 200; Referees: Urrutea, Jímenez

6 December 2017; 18:00	Costa Rica	30–22	Nicaragua	Instituto nicaraguense de deportes, Managua; Attendance: 500; Referees: Reyes, Zuñiga
6 December 2017; 18:00	Molina, Vargas 8	(15–8)	three players 4	Instituto nicaraguense de deportes, Managua; Attendance: 500; Referees: Reyes, Zuñiga
6 December 2017; 18:00	2× (yellow card) 4× (suspension)	Report	1× (yellow card) 3× (suspension) 2× (red card)	Instituto nicaraguense de deportes, Managua; Attendance: 500; Referees: Reyes, Zuñiga

7 December 2017; 11:30	Guatemala	25–22	Honduras	Instituto nicaraguense de deportes, Managua; Attendance: 300; Referees: Reyes, Zuñiga
7 December 2017; 11:30	Morales 7	(13–14)	García 6	Instituto nicaraguense de deportes, Managua; Attendance: 300; Referees: Reyes, Zuñiga
7 December 2017; 11:30	1× (yellow card) 4× (suspension)	Report	2× (yellow card) 1× (suspension) 1× (red card)	Instituto nicaraguense de deportes, Managua; Attendance: 300; Referees: Reyes, Zuñiga

7 December 2017; 15:30	El Salvador	19–25	Costa Rica	Instituto nicaraguense de deportes, Managua; Attendance: 300; Referees: Jímenez, Urrutea
7 December 2017; 15:30	Merino 7	(10–10)	Molina 8	Instituto nicaraguense de deportes, Managua; Attendance: 300; Referees: Jímenez, Urrutea
7 December 2017; 15:30	1× (yellow card) 3× (suspension) 1× (red card)	Report	2× (yellow card) 5× (suspension) 1× (red card)	Instituto nicaraguense de deportes, Managua; Attendance: 300; Referees: Jímenez, Urrutea

8 December 2017; 16:00	Honduras	19–34	Costa Rica	Instituto nicaraguense de deportes, Managua; Attendance: 500; Referees: Reyes, Zuñiga
8 December 2017; 16:00	four players 3	(9–16)	Vargas 8	Instituto nicaraguense de deportes, Managua; Attendance: 500; Referees: Reyes, Zuñiga
8 December 2017; 16:00	1× (yellow card) 5× (suspension) 1× (red card)	Report	1× (yellow card) 3× (suspension) 1× (red card)	Instituto nicaraguense de deportes, Managua; Attendance: 500; Referees: Reyes, Zuñiga

8 December 2017; 20:00	Nicaragua	26–37	Guatemala	Instituto nicaraguense de deportes, Managua; Attendance: 500; Referees: Segura, Valverde
8 December 2017; 20:00	Sotomayor 5	(14–20)	Morales 10	Instituto nicaraguense de deportes, Managua; Attendance: 500; Referees: Segura, Valverde
8 December 2017; 20:00	3× (yellow card)	Report	2× (yellow card) 1× (suspension)	Instituto nicaraguense de deportes, Managua; Attendance: 500; Referees: Segura, Valverde

== Final standing ==
Rank	Team
Gold medal	Guatemala
Silver medal	Costa Rica
Bronze medal	Honduras
4	Nicaragua
5	El Salvador

Teams qualified to the 2018 Central American and Caribbean Games

== Women's tournament ==
=== Qualification round ===
Team	Pld	W	D	L	GF	GA	GD	Pts
Guatemala	3	3	0	0	73	48	25	6
Nicaragua	3	2	0	1	70	78	–8	4
Costa Rica	3	1	0	2	66	58	8	2
El Salvador	3	0	0	3	52	77	–25	0

All times are local (UTC−06:00).

4 December 2017; 14:00	Costa Rica	26–15	El Salvador	Instituto nicaraguense de deportes, Managua; Attendance: 250; Referees: Urrutea, Jimenez
4 December 2017; 14:00	Araya 10	(13–10)	Cuellar 4	Instituto nicaraguense de deportes, Managua; Attendance: 250; Referees: Urrutea, Jimenez
4 December 2017; 14:00	1× (yellow card) 2× (suspension)	Report	4× (yellow card) 4× (suspension)	Instituto nicaraguense de deportes, Managua; Attendance: 250; Referees: Urrutea, Jimenez

4 December 2017; 18:00	Guatemala	28–19	Nicaragua	Instituto nicaraguense de deportes, Managua; Attendance: 500; Referees: Cruz, Paguaga
4 December 2017; 18:00	Lavarreda, Sosa 6	(14–10)	Gutierrez 3	Instituto nicaraguense de deportes, Managua; Attendance: 500; Referees: Cruz, Paguaga
4 December 2017; 18:00	2× (yellow card) 1× (suspension)	Report	3× (yellow card) 4× (suspension)	Instituto nicaraguense de deportes, Managua; Attendance: 500; Referees: Cruz, Paguaga

5 December 2017; 14:00	El Salvador	12–25	Guatemala	Instituto nicaraguense de deportes, Managua; Attendance: 200; Referees: Ramirez, Gomez
5 December 2017; 14:00	Navarrete 3	(4–15)	Florián 5	Instituto nicaraguense de deportes, Managua; Attendance: 200; Referees: Ramirez, Gomez
5 December 2017; 14:00	3× (yellow card) 3× (suspension)	Report	3× (yellow card) 4× (suspension)	Instituto nicaraguense de deportes, Managua; Attendance: 200; Referees: Ramirez, Gomez

5 December 2017; 18:00	Nicaragua	25–23	Costa Rica	Instituto nicaraguense de deportes, Managua; Attendance: 500; Referees: Fernandez, Gonzalez
5 December 2017; 18:00	Acuña 6	(11–9)	Camacho 7	Instituto nicaraguense de deportes, Managua; Attendance: 500; Referees: Fernandez, Gonzalez
5 December 2017; 18:00	1× (yellow card) 7× (suspension)	Report	1× (yellow card) 5× (suspension)	Instituto nicaraguense de deportes, Managua; Attendance: 500; Referees: Fernandez, Gonzalez

6 December 2017; 12:00	El Salvador	25–26	Nicaragua	Instituto nicaraguense de deportes, Managua; Attendance: 300; Referees: Segura, Valverde
6 December 2017; 12:00	Cuellar 7	(14–11)	Acuña, Ortega 6	Instituto nicaraguense de deportes, Managua; Attendance: 300; Referees: Segura, Valverde
6 December 2017; 12:00	2× (yellow card) 3× (suspension) 1× (red card)	Report	3× (yellow card) 2× (suspension)	Instituto nicaraguense de deportes, Managua; Attendance: 300; Referees: Segura, Valverde

6 December 2017; 14:00	Costa Rica	17–20	Guatemala	Instituto nicaraguense de deportes, Managua; Attendance: 300; Referees: Cruz, Paguaga
6 December 2017; 14:00	Ramirez 8	(8–12)	Lavarreda 6	Instituto nicaraguense de deportes, Managua; Attendance: 300; Referees: Cruz, Paguaga
6 December 2017; 14:00	1× (yellow card) 1× (suspension)	Report	3× (yellow card) 5× (suspension) 1× (red card)	Instituto nicaraguense de deportes, Managua; Attendance: 300; Referees: Cruz, Paguaga

== Knockout stage ==
=== Bracket ===
Semifinals
December 7
Guatemala	20
El Salvador	14
December 7
Nicaragua	28
Costa Rica	31

Final
December 8
Guatemala	24
Costa Rica	21
Third place
December 8
El Salvador	24
Nicaragua	33

=== Semifinals ===
7 December 2017; 09:30	Guatemala	20–14	El Salvador	Instituto nicaraguense de deportes, Managua; Attendance: 250; Referees: Ramirez, Gomez
7 December 2017; 09:30	Sosa 6	(10–6)	Ayala 4	Instituto nicaraguense de deportes, Managua; Attendance: 250; Referees: Ramirez, Gomez
7 December 2017; 09:30	3× (yellow card) 4× (suspension)	Report	2× (suspension)	Instituto nicaraguense de deportes, Managua; Attendance: 250; Referees: Ramirez, Gomez

7 December 2017; 14:00	Nicaragua	28–31	Costa Rica	Instituto nicaraguense de deportes, Managua; Attendance: 500; Referees: González, Fernández
7 December 2017; 14:00	Rivera 9	(13–15)	Araya, Ramirez 9	Instituto nicaraguense de deportes, Managua; Attendance: 500; Referees: González, Fernández
7 December 2017; 14:00	2× (yellow card) 5× (suspension)	Report	2× (yellow card) 5× (suspension)	Instituto nicaraguense de deportes, Managua; Attendance: 500; Referees: González, Fernández

=== Bronze medal game ===
8 December 2017; 14:00	El Salvador	24–33	Nicaragua	Instituto nicaraguense de deportes, Managua; Referees: Urrutia, Jimenez
8 December 2017; 14:00	Ayala, Guardado 5	(11–17)	Rivera 7	Instituto nicaraguense de deportes, Managua; Referees: Urrutia, Jimenez
8 December 2017; 14:00	4× (suspension)	Report	1× (yellow card) 2× (suspension)	Instituto nicaraguense de deportes, Managua; Referees: Urrutia, Jimenez

=== Gold medal game ===
8 December 2017; 18:00	Guatemala	24–21	Costa Rica	Instituto nicaraguense de deportes, Managua; Attendance: 500; Referees: Cruz, Paguaga
8 December 2017; 18:00	Lavarreda 10	(11–10)	Polanco 8	Instituto nicaraguense de deportes, Managua; Attendance: 500; Referees: Cruz, Paguaga
8 December 2017; 18:00	2× (yellow card) 7× (suspension)	Report	3× (yellow card) 3× (suspension)	Instituto nicaraguense de deportes, Managua; Attendance: 500; Referees: Cruz, Paguaga

== Final standing ==
Rank	Team
Gold medal	Guatemala
Silver medal	Costa Rica
Bronze medal	Nicaragua
4	El Salvador

Teams qualified to the 2018 Central American and Caribbean Games
