= 2022 South and Central American Women's Handball Championship =

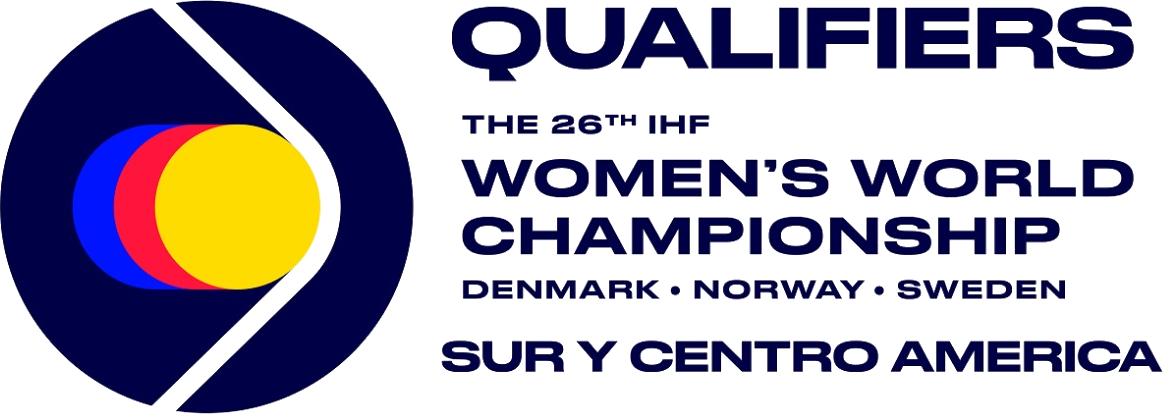

Tournament details
- Host country: Argentina
- Venue: 1 (in 1 host city)
- Dates: 15–19 November
- Teams: 5 (from 1 confederation)

Final positions
- Champions: Brazil (3rd title)
- Runners-up: Argentina
- Third place: Chile
- Fourth place: Uruguay

Tournament statistics
- Matches played: 10
- Goals scored: 493 (49.3 per match)
- Attendance: 11,450 (1,145 per match)
- Top scorers: (Brazil) Bruna de Paula (25 goals)

‌The 2022 South and Central American Women's Handball Championship was the third edition of the championship and held from 15 to 19 November 2022 at Buenos Aires, Argentina under the aegis of South and Central America Handball Confederation. It was the first time in history that the championship is organised by the Argentinean Handball Confederation and also acted as the qualification tournament for the 2023 World Women's Handball Championship, with the top two teams qualifying.

Brazil won their third title.

== Qualified teams ==
| Competition | Dates | Vacancies | Qualified |
|---|---|---|---|
| Host nation | | 1 | Argentina |
| Invited nations who confirmed presence | | 4 | Brazil; Chile; Paraguay; Uruguay |

== Standings ==
| Pos | Team | Pld | W | D | L | GF | GA | GD | Pts | Qualification |
|---|---|---|---|---|---|---|---|---|---|---|
| 1st place, gold medalist(s) | Brazil | 4 | 4 | 0 | 0 | 139 | 72 | +67 | 8 | 2023 World Championship |
| 2nd place, silver medalist(s) | Argentina (H) | 4 | 3 | 0 | 1 | 99 | 78 | +21 | 6 | 2023 World Championship |
| 3rd place, bronze medalist(s) | Chile | 4 | 2 | 0 | 2 | 83 | 105 | −22 | 4 | |
| 4 | Uruguay | 4 | 1 | 0 | 3 | 87 | 111 | −24 | 2 | |
| 5 | Paraguay | 4 | 0 | 0 | 4 | 85 | 127 | −42 | 0 | |

Source: Torneoscoscabal
Rules for classification: 1) Points; 2) Head-to-head points; 3) Head-to-head goal difference; 4) Head-to-head goals scored; 5) Goal difference; 6) Goals scored; 7) Draw.
(H) Hosts

== Results ==
All times are local (UTC−3).

| 15 November 2022; 17:30 | Paraguay | 22–26 | Chile | Estadio Mary Terán de Weiss, Buenos Aires; Attendance: 100; Referees: Lemes, Sosa (URU) |
| 15 November 2022; 17:30 | Fernández, Portillo 5 | (8–13) | Lovera 8 | Estadio Mary Terán de Weiss, Buenos Aires; Attendance: 100; Referees: Lemes, Sosa (URU) |
| 15 November 2022; 17:30 | 2× (yellow card) 3× (suspension) | Report | 4× (suspension) | Estadio Mary Terán de Weiss, Buenos Aires; Attendance: 100; Referees: Lemes, Sosa (URU) |

| 15 November 2022; 20:00 | Brazil | 32–18 | Uruguay | Estadio Mary Terán de Weiss, Buenos Aires; Attendance: 150; Referees: Paolantoni, García (ARG) |
| 15 November 2022; 20:00 | De Castro, De Paula 7 | (19–7) | Eastman, Schinca 3 | Estadio Mary Terán de Weiss, Buenos Aires; Attendance: 150; Referees: Paolantoni, García (ARG) |
| 15 November 2022; 20:00 | 2× (yellow card) 3× (suspension) | Report | 1× (yellow card) 2× (red card) | Estadio Mary Terán de Weiss, Buenos Aires; Attendance: 150; Referees: Paolantoni, García (ARG) |

| 16 November 2022; 17:30 | Chile | 15–34 | Brazil | Estadio Mary Terán de Weiss, Buenos Aires; Attendance: 600; Referees: Burgos, Lenzue (URU) |
| 16 November 2022; 17:30 | Paul 3 | (6–15) | Ventura 6 | Estadio Mary Terán de Weiss, Buenos Aires; Attendance: 600; Referees: Burgos, Lenzue (URU) |
| 16 November 2022; 17:30 | 2× (suspension) | Report | 2× (suspension) | Estadio Mary Terán de Weiss, Buenos Aires; Attendance: 600; Referees: Burgos, Lenzue (URU) |

| 16 November 2022; 20:00 | Argentina | 29–17 | Uruguay | Estadio Mary Terán de Weiss, Buenos Aires; Attendance: 3,000; Referees: Corrêa, Corrêa (BRA) |
| 16 November 2022; 20:00 | Karsten 7 | (16–7) | Bianco 7 | Estadio Mary Terán de Weiss, Buenos Aires; Attendance: 3,000; Referees: Corrêa, Corrêa (BRA) |
| 16 November 2022; 20:00 | 1× (yellow card) 2× (suspension) | Report | 1× (yellow card) 3× (suspension) | Estadio Mary Terán de Weiss, Buenos Aires; Attendance: 3,000; Referees: Corrêa, Corrêa (BRA) |

| 17 November 2022; 17:30 | Uruguay | 23–24 | Chile | Estadio Mary Terán de Weiss, Buenos Aires; Attendance: 300; Referees: García, Paolantoni (ARG) |
| 17 November 2022; 17:30 | Bianco 8 | (12–11) | Lovera 11 | Estadio Mary Terán de Weiss, Buenos Aires; Attendance: 300; Referees: García, Paolantoni (ARG) |
| 17 November 2022; 17:30 | 2× (yellow card) 4× (suspension) | Report | 1× (yellow card) 8× (suspension) 1× (red card) | Estadio Mary Terán de Weiss, Buenos Aires; Attendance: 300; Referees: García, Paolantoni (ARG) |

| 17 November 2022; 20:00 | Paraguay | 17–25 | Argentina | Estadio Mary Terán de Weiss, Buenos Aires; Attendance: 1,300; Referees: Burgos, Lenzue (URU) |
| 17 November 2022; 20:00 | Fleitas 4 | (8–12) | Karsten 6 | Estadio Mary Terán de Weiss, Buenos Aires; Attendance: 1,300; Referees: Burgos, Lenzue (URU) |
| 17 November 2022; 20:00 | 3× (yellow card) 6× (suspension) 1× (red card) | Report | 1× (yellow card) 3× (suspension) | Estadio Mary Terán de Weiss, Buenos Aires; Attendance: 1,300; Referees: Burgos, Lenzue (URU) |

| 18 November 2022; 17:30 | Brazil | 47–20 | Paraguay | Estadio Mary Terán de Weiss, Buenos Aires; Attendance: 300; Referees: Lemes, Sosa (URU) |
| 18 November 2022; 17:30 | De Castro 9 | (23–5) | Mendoza 5 | Estadio Mary Terán de Weiss, Buenos Aires; Attendance: 300; Referees: Lemes, Sosa (URU) |
| 18 November 2022; 17:30 | 2× (suspension) | Report | 2× (suspension) | Estadio Mary Terán de Weiss, Buenos Aires; Attendance: 300; Referees: Lemes, Sosa (URU) |

| 18 November 2022; 20:00 | Argentina | 26–18 | Chile | Estadio Mary Terán de Weiss, Buenos Aires; Attendance: 1,700; Referees: Corrêa, Corrêa (BRA) |
| 18 November 2022; 20:00 | Casasola 5 | (13–6) | three players 3 | Estadio Mary Terán de Weiss, Buenos Aires; Attendance: 1,700; Referees: Corrêa, Corrêa (BRA) |
| 18 November 2022; 20:00 | 1× (yellow card) 1× (suspension) | Report | 2× (suspension) | Estadio Mary Terán de Weiss, Buenos Aires; Attendance: 1,700; Referees: Corrêa, Corrêa (BRA) |

| 19 November 2022; 17:30 | Paraguay | 26–29 | Uruguay | Estadio Mary Terán de Weiss, Buenos Aires; Attendance: 500; Referees: Paolantoni, García (ARG) |
| 19 November 2022; 17:30 | Fleitas 7 | (16–13) | Bianco 7 | Estadio Mary Terán de Weiss, Buenos Aires; Attendance: 500; Referees: Paolantoni, García (ARG) |
| 19 November 2022; 17:30 | 1× (yellow card) 4× (suspension) | Report | 2× (suspension) | Estadio Mary Terán de Weiss, Buenos Aires; Attendance: 500; Referees: Paolantoni, García (ARG) |

| 19 November 2022; 20:00 | Brazil | 26–19 | Argentina | Estadio Mary Terán de Weiss, Buenos Aires; Attendance: 3,500; Referees: Lemes, Sosa (URU) |
| 19 November 2022; 20:00 | De Paula 10 | (14–11) | Karsten 6 | Estadio Mary Terán de Weiss, Buenos Aires; Attendance: 3,500; Referees: Lemes, Sosa (URU) |
| 19 November 2022; 20:00 | 1× (yellow card) 3× (suspension) | Report | 1× (yellow card) | Estadio Mary Terán de Weiss, Buenos Aires; Attendance: 3,500; Referees: Lemes, Sosa (URU) |

== Team champion roster ==
2022 South and Central American Women's Champions

Brazil
Third title

Team roster: Gabriela Moreschi, Bruna de Paula, Mariane Fernándes, Tamires Frossard, Ana Paula Rodrigues, Karoline de Souza, Bárbara Arenhart, Larissa Araújo, Adriana Cardoso de Castro, Giulia Guarieiro, Thais Fermo, Francielle da Rocha, Fernanda de Lima, Marcela Arounian, Patrícia Matieli, Mariana Costa, Lívia Ventura
Head coach: Cristiano Silva.
