= 1991 Pan American Women's Handball Championship =

Tournament details
- Host country: Brazil
- Venue(s): 1 (in 1 host city)
- Dates: 30 September – 6 October 1991
- Teams: 7 (from 1 confederation)

Final positions
- Champions: United States (2nd title)
- Runners-up: Canada
- Third place: Brazil
- Fourth place: Argentina

Tournament statistics
- Matches played: 15
- Goals scored: 698 (46.53 per match)

The 1991 Pan American Women's Handball Championship was the third edition of the Pan American Women's Handball Championship, held in Brazil from 30 September to 6 October 1991. It acted as the American qualifying tournament for the 1992 Summer Olympics.

== Preliminary round ==
All times are local (UTC−3).

=== Group A ===
| Team | Pld | W | D | L | GF | GA | GD | Pts |
|---|---|---|---|---|---|---|---|---|
| United States | 3 | 3 | 0 | 0 | 130 | 3 | +127 | 6 |
| Brazil (H) | 3 | 2 | 0 | 1 | 123 | 32 | +91 | 4 |
| Paraguay | 3 | 1 | 0 | 2 | 46 | 101 | −55 | 2 |
| Puerto Rico | 3 | 0 | 0 | 3 | 15 | 158 | −143 | 0 |

(H) Hosts

| 30 September 1991; 16:00 | United States | 50–9 | Paraguay |

| 30 September 1991; 20:30 | Brazil | 61–2 | Puerto Rico |

| 1 October 1991; 18:30 | United States | 66–5 | Puerto Rico |

| 1 October 1991; 20:00 | Brazil | 43–6 | Paraguay |

| 3 October 1991; 18:30 | Paraguay | 31–8 | Puerto Rico |

| 3 October 1991; 20:00 | United States | 24–19 | Brazil |

=== Group B ===
| Team | Pld | W | D | L | GF | GA | GD | Pts |
|---|---|---|---|---|---|---|---|---|
| Canada | 2 | 2 | 0 | 0 | 76 | 18 | +58 | 4 |
| Argentina | 2 | 1 | 0 | 1 | 28 | 45 | −17 | 2 |
| Uruguay | 2 | 0 | 0 | 2 | 18 | 59 | −41 | 0 |

| 30 September 1991; 14:30 | Canada | 40–9 | Uruguay |

| 1 October 1991; 17:00 | Argentina | 19–9 | Uruguay |

| 2 October 1991; 17:00 | Canada | 36–9 | Argentina |

== Placement round ==
Points from the first round were carried over.

| Pos | Team | Pld | W | D | L | GF | GA | GD | Pts |
|---|---|---|---|---|---|---|---|---|---|
| 5 | Paraguay | 2 | 2 | 0 | 0 | 48 | 12 | +36 | 4 |
| 6 | Uruguay | 2 | 1 | 0 | 1 | 27 | 25 | +2 | 2 |
| 7 | Puerto Rico | 2 | 0 | 0 | 2 | 16 | 54 | −38 | 0 |

Source: Todor66
Rules for classification: 1) points; 2) head-to-head points; 3) head-to-head goal difference; 4) head-to-head number of goals scored; 5) goal difference.

| 5 October 1990; 16:30 | Uruguay | 23–8 | Puerto Rico |

| 6 October 1990; 14:00 | Paraguay | 17–4 | Uruguay |

== Final round ==
Points from the first round were carried over.

| Team | Pld | W | D | L | GF | GA | GD | Pts |
|---|---|---|---|---|---|---|---|---|
| United States | 3 | 3 | 0 | 0 | 98 | 49 | +49 | 6 |
| Canada | 3 | 2 | 0 | 1 | 81 | 64 | +17 | 4 |
| Brazil (H) | 3 | 1 | 0 | 2 | 74 | 65 | +9 | 2 |
| Argentina | 3 | 0 | 0 | 3 | 35 | 110 | −75 | 0 |

(H) Hosts

| 5 October 1991; 18:30 | Canada | 25–24 | Brazil | Ginasio do Clube Olimpico de Maringa, Maringá |

| 5 October 1991; 20:30 | United States | 43–10 | Argentina | Ginasio do Clube Olimpico de Maringa, Maringá |

| 6 October 1991; 15:30 | Brazil | 31–16 | Argentina | Ginasio do Clube Olimpico de Maringa, Maringá |

| 6 October 1991; 17:00 | United States | 31–20 | Canada | Ginasio do Clube Olimpico de Maringa, Maringá |

== Final ranking ==
| Qualified for the 1992 Summer Olympics |

| Rank | Team |
|---|---|
| Gold medal | United States |
| Silver medal | Canada |
| Bronze medal | Brazil |
| 4 | Argentina |
| 5 | Paraguay |
| 6 | Uruguay |
| 7 | Puerto Rico |
