= 2003 Pan American Women's Handball Championship =

Tournament details
- Host country: Brazil
- Venue: 1 (in 1 host city)
- Dates: 29 April – 4 May
- Teams: 7 (from 1 confederation)

Final positions
- Champions: Brazil (4th title)
- Runners-up: Argentina
- Third place: Uruguay
- Fourth place: United States

Tournament statistics
- Matches played: 15
- Goals scored: 676 (45.07 per match)
- Top scorers: (Brazil) Alinea da Silva (29 goals)

The 2003 Pan American Women's Handball Championship was the seventh edition of the Pan American Women's Handball Championship, held in Brazil from 29 April to 4 May 2003. It acted as the American qualifying tournament for the 2003 World Women's Handball Championship.

== Preliminary round ==
All times are local (UTC−3).

=== Group A ===
Team	Pld	W	D	L	GF	GA	GD	Pts
Brazil (H)	3	3	0	0	116	30	+86	6
United States	3	2	0	1	62	62	0	4
Dominican Republic	3	1	0	2	64	87	−23	2
Guatemala	3	0	0	3	37	100	−63	0

(H) Hosts

29 April 2003; 16:00	United States	24–17	Dominican Republic
29 April 2003; 16:00		(10–10)

29 April 2003; 20:20	Brazil	42–3	Guatemala
29 April 2003; 20:20		(19–2)

30 April 2003; 16:00	Dominican Republic	28–20	Guatemala
30 April 2003; 16:00		(15–11)

30 April 2003; 20:20	Brazil	31–8	United States
30 April 2003; 20:20		(18–1)

1 May 2003; 16:00	United States	30–14	Guatemala
1 May 2003; 16:00		(13–7)

1 May 2003; 20:20	Brazil	43–19	Dominican Republic
1 May 2003; 20:20		(22–7)

=== Group B ===
Team	Pld	W	D	L	GF	GA	GD	Pts
Argentina	2	1	0	1	38	31	+7	2
Uruguay	2	1	0	1	36	37	−1	2
Canada	2	1	0	1	37	43	−6	2

29 April 2003; 17:30	Argentina	24–14	Canada
29 April 2003; 17:30		(9–8)

30 April 2003; 18:00	Canada	23–19	Uruguay
30 April 2003; 18:00		(9–7)

1 May 2003; 18:00	Uruguay	17–14	Argentina
1 May 2003; 18:00		(8–6)

== Knockout stage ==
=== Bracket ===
Semifinals
Brazil	44
Uruguay	18
United States	15
Argentina	21

Final
Brazil	39
Argentina	12
Third place
Uruguay	21
United States	14

=== Semifinals ===
2 May 2003; 18:00	Argentina	21–15	United States
2 May 2003; 18:00		(9–7)

2 May 2003; 20:20	Brazil	44–18	Uruguay
2 May 2003; 20:20		(27–7)

=== Seventh place game ===
2 May 2003; 16:00	Canada	40–11	Guatemala
2 May 2003; 16:00		(24–4)

=== Fifth place game ===
3 May 2003; 13:00	Canada	31–20	Dominican Republic
3 May 2003; 13:00		(14–9)

=== Third place game ===
3 May 2003; 15:00	Uruguay	21–14	United States
3 May 2003; 15:00		(12–5)

=== Final ===
4 May 2003; 12:15	Brazil	39–12	Argentina
4 May 2003; 12:15	Da Silva 10	(19–4)	Sanguinetti 7

== Final ranking ==
Qualified for the 2003 World Championship

Rank	Team
Gold medal	Brazil
Silver medal	Argentina
Bronze medal	Uruguay
4	United States
5	Canada
6	Dominican Republic
7	Guatemala
