= 2026 South and Central American Women's Handball Championship =

Tournament details
- Host country: Brazil
- Venue: 1 (in 1 host city)
- Dates: 7–12 December
- Teams: 7 (from 1 confederation)

‌The 2026 South and Central American Women's Handball Championship will be the fifth edition of the championship and held from 7 to 12 December 2026 in Mariana, Brazil under the aegis of South and Central America Handball Confederation. It also acts as the qualification tournament for the 2027 World Women's Handball Championship, with the top three teams qualifying.
