= 1997 Pan American Women's Handball Championship =

Tournament details
- Host country: Brazil
- Venue: 1 (in 1 host city)
- Dates: 29 April – 4 May
- Teams: 6 (from 1 confederation)

Final positions
- Champions: Brazil (1st title)
- Runners-up: Canada
- Third place: Uruguay
- Fourth place: Argentina

Tournament statistics
- Matches played: 17
- Goals scored: 631 (37.12 per match)

The 1997 Pan American Women's Handball Championship was the fourth edition of the Pan American Women's Handball Championship, held in Brazil from 29 April to 4 May 1997. It acted as the American qualifying tournament for the 1997 World Women's Handball Championship.

== Preliminary round ==
Team	Pld	W	D	L	GF	GA	GD	Pts
Brazil (H)	5	5	0	0	158	48	+110	10
Canada	5	4	0	1	109	62	+47	8
Uruguay	5	3	0	2	103	81	+22	6
Argentina	5	2	0	3	71	81	−10	4
Costa Rica	5	0	1	4	62	144	−82	1
Mexico	5	0	1	4	57	144	−87	1

(H) Hosts

29 April 1997	Canada	32–9	Costa Rica

29 April 1997	Uruguay	12–10	Argentina

29 April 1997	Brazil	43–8	Mexico

30 April 1997	Uruguay	33–16	Costa Rica
30 April 1997		(16–8)

30 April 1997	Canada	27–10	Mexico
30 April 1997		(13–5)

30 April 1997	Brazil	25–7	Argentina
30 April 1997		(11–5)

1 May 1997	Argentina	21–12	Mexico
1 May 1997		(11–3)

1 May 1997	Canada	18–9	Uruguay
1 May 1997		(11–3)

1 May 1997	Brazil	40–5	Costa Rica
1 May 1997		(20–2)

2 May 1997	Uruguay	35–9	Mexico
2 May 1997		(16–4)

2 May 1997	Brazil	22–14	Canada
2 May 1997		(11–5)

2 May 1997	Argentina	21–14	Costa Rica
2 May 1997		(11–2)

3 May 1997	Costa Rica	18–18	Mexico
3 May 1997		(13–4)

3 May 1997	Canada	18–12	Argentina
3 May 1997		(8–8)

3 May 1997	Brazil	28–14	Uruguay
3 May 1997		(13–4)

== Knockout stage ==
=== Third place game ===
4 May 1997	Uruguay	19–14	Argentina
4 May 1997		(7–5)

=== Final ===
4 May 1997	Brazil	21–17	Canada
4 May 1997		(12–6)

== Final ranking ==
Qualified for the 1997 World Championship

Rank	Team
Gold medal	Brazil
Silver medal	Canada
Bronze medal	Uruguay
4	Argentina
5	Costa Rica
6	Mexico
