= 2024 South and Central American Women's Handball Championship =

Tournament details
- Host country: Brazil
- Venue: 1 (in 1 host city)
- Dates: 26–30 November
- Teams: 6 (from 1 confederation)

Final positions
- Champions: Brazil (4th title)
- Runners-up: Argentina
- Third place: Uruguay
- Fourth place: Paraguay

Tournament statistics
- Matches played: 15
- Goals scored: 787 (52.47 per match)

‌The 2024 South and Central American Women's Handball Championship was the fourth edition of the championship and held from 26 to 30 November 2024 at Niterói, Brazil under the aegis of South and Central America Handball Confederation. It was the second time in history that the championship was organised by the Brazilian Handball Confederation. It also acted as the qualification tournament for the 2025 World Women's Handball Championship, with the top three teams qualifying.

Brazil won their fourth title in four editions with a win over Argentina.

== Standings ==
Pos	Team	Pld	W	D	L	GF	GA	GD	Pts	Qualification
1	Brazil (H)	5	5	0	0	195	69	+126	10	2025 World Championship
2	Argentina	5	4	0	1	165	107	+58	8	2025 World Championship
3	Uruguay	5	3	0	2	139	110	+29	6	2025 World Championship
4	Paraguay	5	2	0	3	136	132	+4	4	
5	Chile	5	1	0	4	111	140	−29	2	
6	El Salvador	5	0	0	5	41	229	−188	0	

Source: Torneoscoscabal
Rules for classification: 1) Points; 2) Head-to-head points; 3) Head-to-head goal difference; 4) Head-to-head goals scored; 5) Goal difference; 6) Goals scored; 7) Draw.
(H) Hosts

== Results ==
All times are local (UTC−3).

26 November 2024; 14:00	Argentina	45–9	El Salvador	Colégio Niterói, Niterói; Attendance: 80; Referees: Dezembro, Gonçalves (BRA)
26 November 2024; 14:00	Dalle 9	(21–5)	Sandoval, Rivera 3	Colégio Niterói, Niterói; Attendance: 80; Referees: Dezembro, Gonçalves (BRA)
26 November 2024; 14:00	2× (suspension)	Report	5× (suspension)	Colégio Niterói, Niterói; Attendance: 80; Referees: Dezembro, Gonçalves (BRA)

26 November 2024; 16:30	Chile	21–28	Paraguay	Colégio Niterói, Niterói; Attendance: 100; Referees: Lemes, Sosa (URU)
26 November 2024; 16:30	Araya 6	(7–11)	Acuña 6	Colégio Niterói, Niterói; Attendance: 100; Referees: Lemes, Sosa (URU)
26 November 2024; 16:30	4× (suspension)	Report	6× (suspension) 1× (red card)	Colégio Niterói, Niterói; Attendance: 100; Referees: Lemes, Sosa (URU)

26 November 2024; 19:00	Brazil	34–20	Uruguay	Colégio Niterói, Niterói; Attendance: 200; Referees: García, Paolantoni (ARG)
26 November 2024; 19:00	Bolzan, De Paula 5	(17–9)	three players 3	Colégio Niterói, Niterói; Attendance: 200; Referees: García, Paolantoni (ARG)
26 November 2024; 19:00	1× (yellow card) 4× (suspension)	Report	1× (suspension)	Colégio Niterói, Niterói; Attendance: 200; Referees: García, Paolantoni (ARG)

27 November 2024; 14:00	El Salvador	13–38	Chile	Colégio Niterói, Niterói; Attendance: 300; Referees: Araújo, Perdomo (URU)
27 November 2024; 14:00	Reyes, Saz 3	(8–20)	Müller 8	Colégio Niterói, Niterói; Attendance: 300; Referees: Araújo, Perdomo (URU)
27 November 2024; 14:00	3× (suspension)	Report	1× (suspension)	Colégio Niterói, Niterói; Attendance: 300; Referees: Araújo, Perdomo (URU)

27 November 2024; 16:30	Uruguay	18–32	Argentina	Colégio Niterói, Niterói; Attendance: 180; Referees: Dezembro, Gonçalves (BRA)
27 November 2024; 16:30	three players 3	(9–16)	Casasola, Sans 7	Colégio Niterói, Niterói; Attendance: 180; Referees: Dezembro, Gonçalves (BRA)
27 November 2024; 16:30	2× (suspension)	Report	1× (suspension)	Colégio Niterói, Niterói; Attendance: 180; Referees: Dezembro, Gonçalves (BRA)

27 November 2024; 19:00	Paraguay	13–40	Brazil	Colégio Niterói, Niterói; Attendance: 400; Referees: García, Paolantoni (ARG)
27 November 2024; 19:00	Portillo 4	(7–23)	Cardoso 10	Colégio Niterói, Niterói; Attendance: 400; Referees: García, Paolantoni (ARG)
27 November 2024; 19:00	2× (suspension)	Report	1× (suspension)	Colégio Niterói, Niterói; Attendance: 400; Referees: García, Paolantoni (ARG)

28 November 2024; 14:00	Argentina	30–23	Chile	Colégio Niterói, Niterói; Attendance: 120; Referees: Araújo, Perdomo (URU)
28 November 2024; 14:00	Casasola, García 6	(12–12)	Müller 8	Colégio Niterói, Niterói; Attendance: 120; Referees: Araújo, Perdomo (URU)
28 November 2024; 14:00	3× (suspension)	Report	2× (suspension) 1× (red card)	Colégio Niterói, Niterói; Attendance: 120; Referees: Araújo, Perdomo (URU)

28 November 2024; 16:30	Uruguay	25–20	Paraguay	Colégio Niterói, Niterói; Referees: García, Paolantoni (ARG)
28 November 2024; 16:30		(11–11)		Colégio Niterói, Niterói; Referees: García, Paolantoni (ARG)

28 November 2024; 19:00	Brazil	48–3	El Salvador	Colégio Niterói, Niterói; Attendance: 450; Referees: Lemes, Sosa (URU)
28 November 2024; 19:00	Quintino 11	(25–1)	Reyes 2	Colégio Niterói, Niterói; Attendance: 450; Referees: Lemes, Sosa (URU)
28 November 2024; 19:00		Report	1× (yellow card) 1× (suspension)	Colégio Niterói, Niterói; Attendance: 450; Referees: Lemes, Sosa (URU)

29 November 2024; 14:00	El Salvador	6–49	Uruguay	Colégio Niterói, Niterói; Attendance: 80; Referees: Dezembro, Gonçalves (BRA)
29 November 2024; 14:00	Escalante, Saz 2	(3–23)	Barreiro 8	Colégio Niterói, Niterói; Attendance: 80; Referees: Dezembro, Gonçalves (BRA)
29 November 2024; 14:00	2× (suspension)	Report	2× (suspension)	Colégio Niterói, Niterói; Attendance: 80; Referees: Dezembro, Gonçalves (BRA)

29 November 2024; 16:30	Argentina	36–26	Paraguay	Colégio Niterói, Niterói; Attendance: 150; Referees: Lemes, Sosa (URU)
29 November 2024; 16:30	Urban 8	(18–12)	Acuña 6	Colégio Niterói, Niterói; Attendance: 150; Referees: Lemes, Sosa (URU)
29 November 2024; 16:30	1× (yellow card) 6× (suspension)	Report	2× (yellow card) 3× (suspension) 1× (red card)	Colégio Niterói, Niterói; Attendance: 150; Referees: Lemes, Sosa (URU)

29 November 2024; 19:00	Chile	11–42	Brazil	Colégio Niterói, Niterói; Attendance: 450; Referees: Araújo, Perdomo (URU)
29 November 2024; 19:00	three players 2	(4–19)	De Paula, Guarieiro 5	Colégio Niterói, Niterói; Attendance: 450; Referees: Araújo, Perdomo (URU)
29 November 2024; 19:00	1× (suspension)	Report	2× (yellow card)	Colégio Niterói, Niterói; Attendance: 450; Referees: Araújo, Perdomo (URU)

30 November 2024; 14:00	Paraguay	49–10	El Salvador	Colégio Niterói, Niterói; Attendance: 80; Referees: Araújo, Perdomo (URU)
30 November 2024; 14:00	Portillo 8	(21–4)	Sandoval 3	Colégio Niterói, Niterói; Attendance: 80; Referees: Araújo, Perdomo (URU)
30 November 2024; 14:00	1× (yellow card) 1× (suspension)	Report	3× (suspension)	Colégio Niterói, Niterói; Attendance: 80; Referees: Araújo, Perdomo (URU)

30 November 2024; 16:30	Chile	18–27	Uruguay	Colégio Niterói, Niterói; Attendance: 300; Referees: García, Paolantoni (ARG)
30 November 2024; 16:30	Müller 5	(8–9)	Barreiro, Torunier 4	Colégio Niterói, Niterói; Attendance: 300; Referees: García, Paolantoni (ARG)
30 November 2024; 16:30	4× (suspension)	Report	2× (yellow card) 2× (suspension)	Colégio Niterói, Niterói; Attendance: 300; Referees: García, Paolantoni (ARG)

30 November 2024; 19:00	Brazil	31–22	Argentina	Colégio Niterói, Niterói; Attendance: 650; Referees: Lemes, Sosa (URU)
30 November 2024; 19:00	De Paula 6	(17–11)	Cavo 6	Colégio Niterói, Niterói; Attendance: 650; Referees: Lemes, Sosa (URU)
30 November 2024; 19:00	1× (yellow card) 2× (suspension) 2× (red card)	Report	1× (yellow card) 4× (suspension)	Colégio Niterói, Niterói; Attendance: 650; Referees: Lemes, Sosa (URU)
