= Paraguay women's national handball team =

Paraguay

Information
- Association: Confederación Paraguaya de Handball
- Coach: Marizza Faría
- Assistant coach: Carlos Giménez

Colours
1st	2nd

Results

World Championship
- Appearances: 5 (First in 2007)
- Best result: 21st (2013, 2017)

Pan American Championship
- Appearances: 7 (First in 1986)
- Best result: 3rd (2017)
- Last updated on Unknown.

Paraguay women's national handball team
Medal record

Pan American Championship
Bronze medal – third place	Argentina 2017	

The Paraguay women's national handball team is the team that represents Paraguay in international handball competitions and is governed by the Confederación Paraguaya de Handball.

== Results ==
=== World Championship ===
Year	Round	Position	GP	W	D*	L	GS	GA
1957 to 2005	Did not enter							
(France) 2007	Placement matches	23rd	6	1	0	5	79	211
(China) 2009	Did not qualify							
(Brazil) 2011	Did not qualify							
(Serbia) 2013	Placement matches	21st	7	2	0	5	107	205
(Denmark) 2015	Did not qualify							
(Germany) 2017	Placement matches	21st	7	2	0	5	146	202
(Japan) 2019	Did not qualify							
(Spain) 2021	Placement matches	29th	7	2	0	5	158	201
(Denmark) / (Norway) / (Sweden) 2023	Placement matches	29th	7	2	0	5	157	199
(Germany) / (Netherlands) 2025	Placement matches	27th	7	3	0	4	170	194
(Hungary) 2027	To be determined							
(Spain) 2029	To be determined							
(Czech Republic) / (Poland) 2031	To be determined							
Total	6/30		41	12	0	29	817	1212

=== Pan American Championship ===
Year	Round	Position	GP	W	D*	L	GS	GA
(Brazil) 1986	Round robin	5th	5	1	0	4	70	142
(Brazil) 1991	5th place game	5th	4	2	0	2	63	105
(Dominican Republic) 2007	3rd place match	4th	5	1	1	3	101	139
(Chile) 2009	5th place match	7th	4	0	0	4	80	124
(Dominican Republic) 2013	3rd place match	4th	6	3	0	3	133	179
(Cuba) 2015	7th place match	7th	7	4	0	3	185	181
(Argentina) 2017	Third place game	3rd	6	4	0	2	150	146

=== South and Central American Championship ===
Year	Round	Position	GP	W	D*	L	GS	GA
(Brazil) 2018	Round robin	3rd	4	1	0	3	97	116
(Paraguay) 2021	Round robin	3rd	5	2	1	2	152	128
(Argentina) 2022	Round robin	5th	4	0	0	4	85	127
(Brazil) 2024	Round robin	4th	5	2	0	3	136	132
Total	4/4		18	5	1	12	470	503

=== Central American Championship ===
Year	Round	Position	GP	W	D*	L	GS	GA
(Honduras) 2014	Did not enter							
(Nicaragua) 2016	Did not enter							
(El Salvador) 2021	Did not enter							
(Nicaragua) 2023	round robin	1st	5	5	0	0	202	91
Total	1/4		5	5	0	0	202	91

=== Pan American Games ===
Games	Round	Position	Pld	W	D	L	GF	GA
(Brazil) 2007 Rio de Janeiro	7th place game	7th	5	2	0	3	127	136
(Chile) 2023 Santiago	Bronze medal game	3rd	5	2	0	3	109	124
(Paraguay) 2031 Asunción	Qualified as host							

=== Junior Pan American Games ===
Games	Round	Position	Pld	W	D	L	GF	GA
(Colombia) 2021 Cali	Gold medal game	2nd	5	3	0	2	156	124

=== South American Games ===
Games	Round	Position4	Pld	W	D	L	GF	GA
(Colombia) 2010 Santiago	Round robin	5th	5	1	0	4	112	154
(Chile) 2014 Santiago	Round robin	5th	4	1	0	3	74	115
(Bolivia) 2018 Cochabamba	Bronze medal game	4th	4	1	0	3	89	109
(Paraguay) 2022 Asunción	Round robin	2nd	5	3	0	2	135	105

=== Bolivarian Games ===
Games	Round	Position	Pld	W	D	L	GF	GA
(Colombia) 2017 Santa Marta	round robin	1st	5	5	0	0	233	82
(Colombia) 2022 Valledupar/Chía	gold medal match	1st	3	3	0	0	120	52

=== Olympic qualification tournament ===
Tournament	Outcome	Position	Pld	W	D	L	GF	GA
(Germany) 2024	not qualified	4th	3	0	0	3	59	99

=== World Championship qualification tournament ===
Tournament	Outcome	Position	Pld	W	D	L	GF	GA
(Colombia) 2025	Qualified	1st	2	2	0	0	74	34

== Current squad ==
Roster for the 2025 World Women's Handball Championship.

Head coach: Marizza Faría

No.	Pos.	Name	Date of birth (age)	Height	App.	Goals	Club
2	LW	Fátima Acuña	14 August 1999 (age 27)	1.78 m	122	187	(Spain) Club Adesal Córdoba
4	RB	Fernanda Insfrán	7 February 1998 (age 28)	1.58 m	115	407	(Spain) CB Sporting La Rioja
6	P	Sabrina Fiore	17 April 1996 (age 30)	1.76 m	122	100	(North Macedonia) WHC Chair
10	P	Gisela González	16 April 1997 (age 29)	1.71 m	75	83	(Spain) BM Gijón
11	CB	Delyne Leiva	27 March 1998 (age 28)	1.59 m	115	155	(Spain) Lanzarote Puerto del Carmen
12	GK	Fátima Ocampos	3 January 2003 (age 23)	1.80 m	52	12	(Italy) Ariosto 2023
14	LB	María Paula Fernández	30 August 1998 (age 28)	1.54 m	115	214	(Spain) CB Zonzamas
16	LB	Jessica Fleitas	22 August 1997 (age 29)	1.63 m	100	104	(Paraguay) Club Juventud Ypanense
18	P	Maggie Lugo	8 April 1994 (age 32)	1.73 m	52	39	(Paraguay) Club Deportivo Internacional
24	LW	Ariana Portillo	17 August 2001 (age 25)	1.66 m	77	97	(Spain) CB Atlético Guardés
25	GK	María Machucha	23 October 1994 (age 31)	1.76 m	115	12	(Spain) CB Caniza
26	RW	Jazmín Mendoza	27 May 2002 (age 24)	1.64 m	60	95	(Spain) CB Atlético Guardés
27	LW	Brenda Torres	26 October 2002 (age 23)	1.62 m	4	2	(Spain) Lanzarote Puerto del Carmen
28	LB	Milagros Samaniego	18 March 2006 (age 20)	1.78 m	27	15	(Paraguay) Cerro Porteño
35	CB	Fiorella Enríquez	20 April 2006 (age 20)	1.63 m	7	0	(Paraguay) Club Deportivo Internacional
39	RW	Valheria Valdovinos	4 September 2001 (age 24)	1.63 m	0	0	(Paraguay) Cerro Porteño

== List of coaches ==
- Ruben Subeldia
- Antonio Bordon
- Neri Vera (-2022)
- Marizza Faría (2022- )
