= Brazil women's national handball team =

Women's national handball team of Brazil

Brazil

Information
- Association: Confederação Brasileira de Handebol
- Coach: Cristiano Silva
- Assistant coach: Álvaro Herdeiro
- Captain: Bruna de Paula
- Most caps: Ana Paula Belo (230)
- Most goals: Ana Paula Belo (806)

Colours
| 1st | 2nd |

Results

Summer Olympics
- Appearances: 7 (First in 2000)
- Best result: 5th (2016)

World Championship
- Appearances: 16 (First in 1995)
- Best result: (gold) 1st (2013)

Pan American Championship
- Appearances: 14 (First in 1986)
- Best result: 1st (1997, 1999, 2000, 2003, 2005, 2007, 2011, 2013, 2015, 2017)
- Last updated on Unknown.

Brazil women's national handball team
Medal record

World Championship
| Gold medal – first place | 2013 Serbia | |

Pan American Championship
| Gold medal – first place | Brazil 1997 | |
| Gold medal – first place | Argentina 1999 | |
| Gold medal – first place | Brazil 2000 | |
| Gold medal – first place | Brazil 2003 | |
| Gold medal – first place | Brazil 2005 | |
| Gold medal – first place | Dominican Republic 2007 | |
| Gold medal – first place | Brazil 2011 | |
| Gold medal – first place | Dominican Republic 2013 | |
| Gold medal – first place | Cuba 2015 | |
| Gold medal – first place | Argentina 2017 | |
| Silver medal – second place | Chile 2009 | |
| Bronze medal – third place | Brazil 1986 | |
| Bronze medal – third place | United States 1989 | |
| Bronze medal – third place | Brazil 1991 | |

Pan American Games
| Gold medal – first place | Winnipeg 1999 | Team |
| Gold medal – first place | Santo Domingo 2003 | Team |
| Gold medal – first place | Rio 2007 | Team |
| Gold medal – first place | Guadalajara 2011 | Team |
| Gold medal – first place | Toronto 2015 | Team |
| Gold medal – first place | Lima 2019 | Team |
| Gold medal – first place | Santiago 2023 | Team |
| Bronze medal – third place | Indianapolis 1987 | Team |
| Bronze medal – third place | Mar Del Plata 1995 | Team |

Youth Olympic Games
| Bronze medal – third place | Singapore 2010 | Team |

The Brazil women's national handball team is the national team of Brazil. It is governed by the Confederação Brasileira de Handebol and takes part in international handball competitions.

== History ==
In December 2013, the team won the World Championship for the first time in history after defeating Serbia 22–20 in the final. The Brazilian team won all nine games played in the tournament and became the first nation from Americas, as well as the Southern Hemisphere and only the second non-European country (after South Korea) to win the title.

== Results ==
=== Olympic Games ===
| Games | Round | Position | Pld | W | D | L | GF | GA |
|---|---|---|---|---|---|---|---|---|
| (Canada) 1976 Montreal | did not qualify | | | | | | | |
| (Soviet Union) 1980 Moscow | did not qualify | | | | | | | |
| (United States) 1984 Los Angeles | did not qualify | | | | | | | |
| (South Korea) 1988 Seoul | did not qualify | | | | | | | |
| (Spain) 1992 Barcelona | did not qualify | | | | | | | |
| (United States) 1996 Atlanta | did not qualify | | | | | | | |
| (Australia) 2000 Sydney | Match for 7th place | 8th of 10 | 7 | 1 | 0 | 6 | 180 | 238 |
| (Greece) 2004 Athens | Match for 7th place | 7th of 10 | 7 | 2 | 0 | 5 | 178 | 192 |
| (China) 2008 Beijing | Preliminary round | 9th of 12 | 5 | 1 | 1 | 3 | 124 | 137 |
| (United Kingdom) 2012 London | Quarter-finals | 6th of 12 | 6 | 4 | 0 | 2 | 156 | 143 |
| (Brazil) 2016 Rio de Janeiro | Quarter-finals | 5th of 12 | 6 | 4 | 0 | 2 | 161 | 149 |
| (Japan) 2020 Tokyo | Preliminary round | 11th of 12 | 5 | 1 | 1 | 3 | 133 | 141 |
| (France) 2024 Paris | Quarterfinals | 7th of 12 | 6 | 2 | 0 | 4 | 142 | 151 |
| Total | 6/13 | | 42 | 15 | 2 | 25 | 1074 | 1151 |

=== World Championships ===
| Year | Round | Position | GP | W | D* | L | GS | GA |
|---|---|---|---|---|---|---|---|---|
| (Socialist Federal Republic of Yugoslavia) 1957 | did not enter | | | | | | | |
| (Romania) 1962 | did not enter | | | | | | | |
| (West Germany) 1965 | did not enter | | | | | | | |
| (Netherlands) 1971 | did not enter | | | | | | | |
| (Socialist Federal Republic of Yugoslavia) 1973 | did not enter | | | | | | | |
| (Soviet Union) 1975 | did not enter | | | | | | | |
| (Czechoslovakia) 1978 | did not enter | | | | | | | |
| (Hungary) 1982 | did not enter | | | | | | | |
| (Netherlands) 1986 | did not enter | | | | | | | |
| (South Korea) 1990 | did not enter | | | | | | | |
| (Norway) 1993 | did not enter | | | | | | | |
| (Austria) (Hungary) 1995 | Preliminary round | 17th–20th | 5 | 0 | 0 | 5 | 79 | 139 |
| (Germany) 1997 | Preliminary round | 23rd | 5 | 0 | 0 | 5 | 104 | 155 |
| (Denmark) (Norway) 1999 | Round of 16 | 16th | 6 | 1 | 1 | 4 | 127 | 153 |
| (Italy) 2001 | Round of 16 | 12th | 6 | 3 | 0 | 3 | 155 | 168 |
| (Croatia) 2003 | Preliminary round | 20th | 5 | 1 | 0 | 4 | 136 | 155 |
| (Russia) 2005 | Placement matches | 7th | 9 | 6 | 0 | 3 | 276 | 265 |
| (France) 2007 | Placement matches | 14th | 6 | 3 | 1 | 2 | 184 | 128 |
| (China) 2009 | Placement matches | 15th | 9 | 6 | 0 | 3 | 288 | 224 |
| (Brazil) 2011 | Quarter-finals | 5th | 9 | 8 | 0 | 1 | 291 | 228 |
| (Serbia) 2013 | Final | 1st | 9 | 9 | 0 | 0 | 253 | 197 |
| (Denmark) 2015 | Round of 16 | 10th | 6 | 4 | 1 | 1 | 140 | 120 |
| (Germany) 2017 | Placement matches | 18th | 7 | 2 | 2 | 3 | 165 | 172 |
| (Japan) 2019 | Placement matches | 17th | 7 | 3 | 1 | 3 | 173 | 152 |
| (Spain) 2021 | Quarter-finals | 6th | 7 | 5 | 0 | 2 | 201 | 176 |
| (Denmark) / (Norway) / (Sweden) 2023 | Main round | 9th | 6 | 4 | 0 | 2 | 196 | 143 |
| (Germany) / (Netherlands) 2025 | Quarter-finals | 6th | 7 | 5 | 0 | 2 | 201 | 183 |
| (Hungary) 2027 | to be determined | | | | | | | |
| (Spain) 2029 | to be determined | | | | | | | |
| (Czech Republic) / (Poland) 2031 | to be determined | | | | | | | |
| Total | 16/27 | 1 title | 109 | 60 | 6 | 43 | 2969 | 2758 |

=== Pan American Games ===
| Games | Round | Position | Pld | W | D | L | GF | GA |
|---|---|---|---|---|---|---|---|---|
| (United States) 1987 Indianapolis | Bronze medal match | 3rd | 5 | 3 | 0 | 2 | 112 | 95 |
| (Cuba) 1991 Havana | Women's competitions not held | | | | | | | |
| (Argentina) 1995 Mar del Plata | Bronze medal match | 3rd | 5 | 3 | 0 | 2 | 126 | 110 |
| (Canada) 1999 Winnipeg | Final | 1st | 7 | 6 | 1 | 0 | 217 | 154 |
| (Dominican Republic) 2003 Santo Domingo | Final | 1st | 7 | 7 | 0 | 0 | 186 | 97 |
| (Brazil) 2007 Rio de Janeiro | Final | 1st | 5 | 5 | 0 | 0 | 183 | 83 |
| (Mexico) 2011 Guadalajara | Final | 1st | 5 | 5 | 0 | 0 | 201 | 70 |
| (Canada) 2015 Toronto | Final | 1st | 5 | 5 | 0 | 0 | 185 | 92 |
| (Peru) 2019 Lima | Final | 1st | 5 | 5 | 0 | 0 | 174 | 78 |
| (Chile) 2023 Santiago | Final | 1st | 5 | 5 | 0 | 0 | 164 | 63 |
| Total | 9/9 | 7 titles | 49 | 44 | 1 | 4 | 1548 | 842 |

=== Pan American Championship ===
| Year | Round | Position | GP | W | D* | L | GS | GA |
|---|---|---|---|---|---|---|---|---|
| (Brazil) 1986 | Round robin | 3rd | | | | | | |
| (United States) 1989 | Round robin | 3rd | 3 | 1 | 0 | 2 | 72 | 53 |
| (Brazil) 1991 | Round robin | 3rd | 5 | 3 | 0 | 2 | 178 | 73 |
| (Brazil) 1997 | Final | 1st | 6 | 6 | 0 | 0 | 179 | 65 |
| (Argentina) 1999 | Round robin | 1st | 5 | 5 | 0 | 0 | 148 | 80 |
| (Brazil) 2000 | Round robin | 1st | 5 | 5 | 0 | 0 | 210 | 81 |
| (Brazil) 2003 | Final | 1st | 5 | 5 | 0 | 0 | 199 | 60 |
| (Brazil) 2005 | Round robin | 1st | 5 | 5 | 0 | 0 | 166 | 56 |
| (Dominican Republic) 2007 | Final | 1st | 5 | 5 | 0 | 0 | 188 | 60 |
| (Chile) 2009 | Final | 2nd | 5 | 4 | 0 | 1 | 173 | 84 |
| (Brazil) 2011 | Final | 1st | 5 | 5 | 0 | 0 | 179 | 83 |
| (Dominican Republic) 2013 | Final | 1st | 6 | 6 | 0 | 0 | 269 | 89 |
| (Cuba) 2015 | Final | 1st | 7 | 7 | 0 | 0 | 208 | 116 |
| (Argentina) 2017 | Final | 1st | 6 | 6 | 0 | 0 | 237 | 95 |
| Total | 14/14 | 10 titles | 68 | 63 | 0 | 5 | 2406 | 995 |

=== South and Central American Championship ===
| Year | Round | Position | GP | W | D* | L | GS | GA |
|---|---|---|---|---|---|---|---|---|
| (Brazil) 2018 | Round robin | 1st | 4 | 4 | 0 | 0 | 131 | 54 |
| (Paraguay) 2021 | Round robin | 1st | 5 | 5 | 0 | 0 | 159 | 79 |
| (Argentina) 2022 | Round robin | 1st | 4 | 4 | 0 | 0 | 139 | 72 |
| (Brazil) 2024 | Round robin | 1st | 5 | 5 | 0 | 0 | 195 | 69 |
| Total | 4/4 | 3 titles | 18 | 18 | 0 | 0 | 624 | 274 |

=== South American Games ===
| Games | Round | Position | Pld | W | D | L | GF | GA |
|---|---|---|---|---|---|---|---|---|
| (Brazil) 2002 São Bernardo do Campo | Round robin | 1st | 4 | 4 | 0 | 0 | 130 | 58 |
| (Argentina) 2006 Mar del Plata | did not enter | | | | | | | |
| (Colombia) 2010 Medellin | Round robin | 2nd | 5 | 4 | 0 | 1 | 195 | 89 |
| (Chile) 2014 Santiago | Round robin | 1st | 4 | 3 | 1 | 0 | 133 | 66 |
| (Bolivia) 2018 Cochabamba | Final | 1st | 4 | 4 | 0 | 0 | 114 | 59 |
| (Paraguay) 2022 Asunción | Round robin | 1st | 5 | 5 | 0 | 0 | 176 | 73 |
| Total | 5/6 | 4 titles | 22 | 20 | 1 | 1 | 748 | 345 |

=== Other tournaments ===
- GF World Cup 2006 – Seventh place
- 2014 International Tournament of Spain –
- 2015 Angola 40 Years Tournament – Third place
- 2015 Carpathian Trophy – Fourth place
- 2016 Firenasjonersturneringer – Fourth place
- 2016 Women's Four Nations Tournament –
- 2017 Women's Four Nations Tournament –
- 2017 Carpathian Trophy – Third place
- 2018 World University Handball Championship –
- 2018 Women's International Tournament of Spain – Second place
- 2019 Women's International Tournament of Spain – Third place
- 2019 Intersport Cup – Third place
- 2019 Japan Cup – Third place
- 2021 HEP Croatia Cup - Second place
- 2022 Intersport Cup – Fourth place
- 2024 Carpathian Trophy -

== Team ==
=== Current squad ===
Squad for the 2025 World Women's Handball Championship.

Head coach: Cristiano Silva

| No. | Pos. | Name | Date of birth (age) | Height | App. | Goals | Club |
|---|---|---|---|---|---|---|---|
| 1 | GK | Gabriela Moreschi | 8 July 1994 (age 32) | 1.90 m | 99 | 0 | (Romania) CSM București |
| 2 | LB | Bruna de Paula | 26 September 1996 (age 29) | 1.70 m | 120 | 410 | (Hungary) Győri ETO KC |
| 3 | RW | Alexandra do Nascimento | 16 September 1981 (age 44) | 1.77 m | 206 | 789 | (Italy) Handball Erice |
| 6 | LB | Mariane Fernándes | 4 January 1996 (age 30) | 1.65 m | 72 | 180 | (Poland) Zagłębie Lubin |
| 8 | LW | Jamily do Nascimento | 8 January 1998 (age 28) | 1.63 m | 20 | 44 | (Brazil) Clube Português do Recife |
| 10 | RW | Jéssica Quintino | 17 April 1991 (age 35) | 1.72 m | 165 | 458 | (Romania) Minaur Baia Mare |
| 19 | P | Milena Menezes | 1 October 2000 (age 25) | 1.80 m | 18 | 23 | (Hungary) Szombathelyi KKA |
| 20 | LW | Larissa Araújo | 1 July 1992 (age 34) | 1.67 m | 115 | 247 | (Romania) CSM Corona Brașov |
| 23 | RB | Giulia Guarieiro | 24 July 1995 (age 31) | 1.75 m | 70 | 110 | (Germany) Thüringer HC |
| 28 | RB | Micaela Rodrigues | 8 February 2003 (age 23) | 1.73 m | 16 | 35 | (Spain) BM Bera Bera |
| 30 | RB | Gabriela Bitolo | 1 April 1999 (age 27) | 1.82 m | 40 | 74 | (Germany) TuS Metzingen |
| 33 | P | Sabryne Santos | 3 February 2001 (age 25) | 1.80 m | 15 | 4 | (Portugal) AA S. Pedro do Sul |
| 35 | CB | Maria Grasielly Brasil | 12 March 2001 (age 25) | 1.73 m | 14 | 20 | (Spain) CD Beti Onak |
| 36 | P | Marcela Arounian | 7 January 2000 (age 26) | 1.83 m | 55 | 87 | (France) Saint-Amand Handball |
| 42 | CB | Jhennifer Lopes | 28 July 2000 (age 26) | 1.77 m | 50 | 27 | (France) Saint-Amand Handball |
| 77 | LB | Kelly Rosa | 25 January 2004 (age 22) | 1.78 m | 34 | 73 | (Hungary) Dunaújvárosi Kohász KA |
| 87 | GK | Renata Arruda | 18 February 1999 (age 27) | 1.78 m | 78 | 7 | (Romania) Gloria Bistrița-Năsăud |
| 90 | RW | Agda Gonçalves | 14 May 1990 (age 36) | 1.64 m | 7 | 13 | (Spain) CBF Elda |

=== Head coach history ===
| Period | Coach |
|---|---|
| | (Brazil) Alexandre Trevisan Schneider |
| 2009–2016 | (Denmark) Morten Soubak |
| 2017–2021 | (Spain) Jorge Dueñas |
| 2021–present | (Brazil) Cristiano Silva |

=== Notable players ===
Several Brazilian players have seen their individual performance recognized at international tournaments.

MVP

- Eduarda Amorim (left back), 2013 World Championship
- Samira Rocha (left wing), 2017 Pan American Championship
- Alexandra do Nascimento (right wing), 2013 Pan American Championship

Top Scorer

- Alexandra do Nascimento (right wing), 57 goals, 2011 World Championship
- Adriana Cardoso de Castro (right wing), 33 goals, 2023 Pan American Games
- Fernanda da Silva (left wing), 35 goals, 2011 Pan American Games; 55 goals, 2013 Pan American Championship
- Aline Silva (left back), 43 goals, 2003 Pan American Games
- Mariana Costa (right wing), 25 goals, 2018 South & Central American Championship
- Bruna de Paula (right wing), 25 goals, 2022 South & Central American Championship

All-Star Team

- Alexandra do Nascimento (right wing), 2012 Olympics, 2009 Pan American Championship, 2013 Pan American Championship
- Chana Masson (goalkeeper), 2011 World Championship
- Bárbara Arenhart (goalkeeper), 2013 World Championship, 2017 Pan American Championship
- Bruna de Paula (centre back), 2025 World Championship
- Fernanda da Silva (left wing), 2009 Pan American Championship
- Samira Rocha (left wing), 2015 Pan American Championship, 2017 Pan American Championship
- Mayssa Pessoa (goalkeeper), 2013 Pan American Championship
- Ana Paula Rodrigues (centre back), 2013 Pan American Championship, 2021 South & Central American Championship
- Eduarda Amorim (left back), 2017 Pan American Championship
- Jaqueline Anastácio (left back), 2015 Pan American Championship
- Jéssica Quintino (right wing), 2017 Pan American Championship, 2021 South & Central American Championship
- Renata Arruda (goalkeeper), 2021 South & Central American Championship
- Tamires Morena Lima (line player), 2021 South & Central American Championship
