= 2016 Central American Women's Handball Championship =

Tournament details
- Host country: Nicaragua
- Venue(s): 1 (in 1 host city)
- Dates: 22–26 November
- Teams: 5 (from 1 confederation)

Final positions
- Champions: Guatemala (2nd title)
- Runners-up: Nicaragua
- Third place: Costa Rica
- Fourth place: El Salvador

Tournament statistics
- Matches played: 10
- Goals scored: 494 (49.4 per match)
- Attendance: 2,500 (250 per match)
- Top scorer(s): Militza Lavarreda (GUA) (44 goals)

The 2016 Central American Women's Handball Championship took place in Managua, Nicaragua from 22 to 26 November 2016. It acted as a qualifying tournament for the 2017 Pan American Women's Handball Championship.

== Results ==
Team	Pld	W	D	L	GF	GA	GD	Pts
Guatemala	4	4	0	0	138	58	+80	8
Nicaragua	4	3	0	1	113	86	+27	6
Costa Rica	4	2	0	2	91	76	+15	4
El Salvador	4	1	0	3	99	128	–29	2
Honduras	4	0	0	4	53	146	–93	0

== Round robin ==
All times are local (UTC−06:00).

November 22; 14:00	Guatemala	38–15	El Salvador	Instituto nicaraguense de deportes, Managua; Attendance: 200; Referees: Zambrano, Aguaga (HON)
November 22; 14:00	Lavarreda 11	(22–7)	three players 3	Instituto nicaraguense de deportes, Managua; Attendance: 200; Referees: Zambrano, Aguaga (HON)
November 22; 14:00	1× (yellow card) 4× (suspension)	Report	2× (yellow card) 4× (suspension)	Instituto nicaraguense de deportes, Managua; Attendance: 200; Referees: Zambrano, Aguaga (HON)

November 22; 16:00	Honduras	13–35	Nicaragua	Instituto nicaraguense de deportes, Managua; Attendance: 300; Referees: Urrutia, Otoniel (GUA)
November 22; 16:00	Gotay, Giron 4	(6–15)	Gutierrez 8	Instituto nicaraguense de deportes, Managua; Attendance: 300; Referees: Urrutia, Otoniel (GUA)
November 22; 16:00	3× (yellow card) 10× (suspension)	Report	2× (yellow card) 2× (suspension)	Instituto nicaraguense de deportes, Managua; Attendance: 300; Referees: Urrutia, Otoniel (GUA)

November 23; 14:00	Honduras	9–28	Costa Rica	Instituto nicaraguense de deportes, Managua; Attendance: 200; Referees: Campos, Espinoza (ESA)
November 23; 14:00	Lopez 3	(6–16)	Araya, Taborda 6	Instituto nicaraguense de deportes, Managua; Attendance: 200; Referees: Campos, Espinoza (ESA)
November 23; 14:00	2× (yellow card) 4× (suspension)	Report	3× (suspension)	Instituto nicaraguense de deportes, Managua; Attendance: 200; Referees: Campos, Espinoza (ESA)

November 23; 17:00	Nicaragua	38–29	El Salvador	Instituto nicaraguense de deportes, Managua; Attendance: 250; Referees: Urrutia, Otoniel (GUA)
November 23; 17:00	three players 6	(19–16)	Bonilla 10	Instituto nicaraguense de deportes, Managua; Attendance: 250; Referees: Urrutia, Otoniel (GUA)
November 23; 17:00	1× (yellow card) 2× (suspension)	Report	2× (yellow card) 4× (suspension)	Instituto nicaraguense de deportes, Managua; Attendance: 250; Referees: Urrutia, Otoniel (GUA)

November 24; 10:00	Honduras	8–48	Guatemala	Instituto nicaraguense de deportes, Managua; Attendance: 150; Referees: Montiel, Alston (NCA)
November 24; 10:00	three players 2	(4–23)	Lavarreda 15	Instituto nicaraguense de deportes, Managua; Attendance: 150; Referees: Montiel, Alston (NCA)
November 24; 10:00	2× (yellow card) 3× (suspension)	Report	1× (yellow card)	Instituto nicaraguense de deportes, Managua; Attendance: 150; Referees: Montiel, Alston (NCA)

November 24; 12:00	Costa Rica	18–21	Nicaragua	Instituto nicaraguense de deportes, Managua; Attendance: 350; Referees: Campos, Espinoza (ESA)
November 24; 12:00	Taborda 5	(10–12)	Gutierrez 6	Instituto nicaraguense de deportes, Managua; Attendance: 350; Referees: Campos, Espinoza (ESA)
November 24; 12:00	2× (yellow card)	Report	1× (yellow card) 2× (suspension)	Instituto nicaraguense de deportes, Managua; Attendance: 350; Referees: Campos, Espinoza (ESA)

November 25; 14:00	El Salvador	35–23	Honduras	Instituto nicaraguense de deportes, Managua; Attendance: 100; Referees: Urrutia, Otoniel (GUA)
November 25; 14:00	Bonilla 13	(20–16)	Lopez 7	Instituto nicaraguense de deportes, Managua; Attendance: 100; Referees: Urrutia, Otoniel (GUA)
November 25; 14:00	1× (yellow card) 2× (suspension)	Report	2× (yellow card) 3× (suspension) 1× (red card)	Instituto nicaraguense de deportes, Managua; Attendance: 100; Referees: Urrutia, Otoniel (GUA)

November 25; 16:00	Guatemala	26–16	Costa Rica	Instituto nicaraguense de deportes, Managua; Attendance: 300; Referees: Zambrano, Aguaga (HON)
November 25; 16:00	Lavarreda 9	(14–7)	Araya 6	Instituto nicaraguense de deportes, Managua; Attendance: 300; Referees: Zambrano, Aguaga (HON)
November 25; 16:00	2× (yellow card) 3× (suspension)	Report	2× (yellow card) 4× (suspension) 1× (red card)	Instituto nicaraguense de deportes, Managua; Attendance: 300; Referees: Zambrano, Aguaga (HON)

November 26; 14:00	El Salvador	20–29	Costa Rica	Instituto nicaraguense de deportes, Managua; Attendance: 150; Referees: Montiel, Hernandez (NCA)
November 26; 14:00	Bonilla 8	(9–14)	Araya 8	Instituto nicaraguense de deportes, Managua; Attendance: 150; Referees: Montiel, Hernandez (NCA)
November 26; 14:00	3× (yellow card) 1× (suspension)	Report	2× (yellow card) 3× (suspension)	Instituto nicaraguense de deportes, Managua; Attendance: 150; Referees: Montiel, Hernandez (NCA)

November 26; 17:00	Guatemala	26–19	Nicaragua	Instituto nicaraguense de deportes, Managua; Attendance: 500; Referees: Campos, Espinoza (ESA)
November 26; 17:00	Lavarreda 9	(15–9)	Kainez 6	Instituto nicaraguense de deportes, Managua; Attendance: 500; Referees: Campos, Espinoza (ESA)
November 26; 17:00	1× (yellow card) 6× (suspension)	Report	1× (yellow card) 3× (suspension)	Instituto nicaraguense de deportes, Managua; Attendance: 500; Referees: Campos, Espinoza (ESA)

== Final standing ==
Rank	Team
Gold medal	Guatemala
Silver medal	Nicaragua
Bronze medal	Costa Rica
4	El Salvador
5	Honduras

Team qualified to the 2017 Pan American Women's Handball Championship
