= Guatemala women's national handball team =

Guatemala

Information
- Association: Federation National de Balomano de Guatemala

Colours
1st	2nd

Results

Pan American Championship
- Appearances: 3 (First in 2003)
- Best result: 7th (2003)
- Last updated on Unknown.

The Guatemala women's national handball team is the national team of Guatemala. It is governed by the Federation National de Balomano de Guatemala and takes part in international handball competitions.

== Results ==
=== Pan American Championship ===
Year	Round	Position	GP	W	D*	L	GS	GA
(Brazil) 2003	7th place match	7th	4	0	0	4	48	140
(Cuba) 2015	11th place match	12th	7	0	0	7	101	277
(Argentina) 2017	9th place match	10th	5	0	0	5	91	173

=== Central American and Caribbean Games ===
Games	Round	Position	Pld	W	D	L	GF	GA
(Colombia) 2018 Barranquilla	5th place game	5th	5	2	0	3	94	140

=== Central American Games ===
Year	Round	Position	GP	W	D*	L	GS	GA
(Nicaragua) 2017	gold medal match	1st	5	5	0	0	117	85

=== Central American Championship ===
Year	Round	Position	GP	W	D*	L	GS	GA
(Honduras) 2014	round robin	1st	4	4	0	0	111	68
(Nicaragua) 2016	round robin	1st	4	4	0	0	138	58
(El Salvador) 2021	Did not enter							
(Nicaragua) 2023	round robin	6th	5	0	0	5	97	179
Total	3/4		13	8	0	5	346	305

=== Pan American Games qualification tournaments ===
Year	Round	Position	GP	W	D*	L	GS	GA
(Mexico) 2019	round robin	4th	3	0	0	3	51	97
