= 2021 Central American Women's Handball Championship =

Tournament details
- Host country: El Salvador
- Venue(s): 1 (in 1 host city)
- Dates: 5–7 August
- Teams: 3 (from 1 confederation)

Final positions
- Champions: Nicaragua (1st title)
- Runner-up: Costa Rica
- Third place: El Salvador

Tournament statistics
- Matches played: 3
- Goals scored: 142 (47.33 per match)
- Attendance: 400 (133 per match)
- Top scorer(s): (Nicaragua) Juvelkis Gutiérrez (Costa Rica) Maria José Polanco (17 goals)

The 2021 Central American Women's Handball Championship took place in San Salvador, El Salvador from 5 to 7 August 2021. It acted as a qualifying tournament for the 2021 South and Central American Women's Handball Championship.

== Results ==
Pos	Team	Pld	W	D	L	GF	GA	GD	Pts	Qualification
1	Nicaragua	2	2	0	0	54	42	+12	4	2021 South and Central American Championship
2	Costa Rica	2	1	0	1	48	46	+2	2	
3	El Salvador	2	0	0	2	40	54	−14	0	

Rules for classification: 1) Points; 2) Head-to-head points; 3) Head-to-head goal difference; 4) Head-to-head goals scored; 5) Goal difference; 6) Goals scored; 7) Draw.

== Round robin ==
All times are local (UTC−06:00).

August 5; 15:00	El Salvador	19–29	Nicaragua	INDES, San Salvador; Attendance: 100; Referees: Zambrano, Pagoaga (HON)
August 5; 15:00	De Leon, Escalante 4	(9–13)	Gutiérrez 10	INDES, San Salvador; Attendance: 100; Referees: Zambrano, Pagoaga (HON)
August 5; 15:00	3× (suspension)	Report	1× (suspension)	INDES, San Salvador; Attendance: 100; Referees: Zambrano, Pagoaga (HON)

August 6; 15:00	Nicaragua	25–23	Costa Rica	INDES, San Salvador; Attendance: 100; Referees: Estrada, Orjuela (COL)
August 6; 15:00	Gutiérrez 7	(11–12)	Polanco 10	INDES, San Salvador; Attendance: 100; Referees: Estrada, Orjuela (COL)
August 6; 15:00	1× (yellow card) 3× (suspension)	Report	1× (yellow card) 6× (suspension)	INDES, San Salvador; Attendance: 100; Referees: Estrada, Orjuela (COL)

August 7; 15:00	Costa Rica	25–21	El Salvador	INDES, San Salvador; Attendance: 200; Referees: Zambrano, Pagoaga (HON)
August 7; 15:00	Muñoz 8	(14–10)	Muñoz 9	INDES, San Salvador; Attendance: 200; Referees: Zambrano, Pagoaga (HON)
August 7; 15:00	2× (yellow card) 5× (suspension)	Report	3× (suspension)	INDES, San Salvador; Attendance: 200; Referees: Zambrano, Pagoaga (HON)
