= Costa Rica women's national handball team =

Costa Rica

Information
- Association: Federacion Costaricense de Balonmano

Colours
1st	2nd

Results

Pan American Championship
- Appearances: 2 (First in 1997)
- Best result: 5th (1997)
- Last updated on Unknown.

The Costa Rica women's national handball team is the national team of Costa Rica. It is governed by the Federacion Costaricense de Balonmano and takes part in international handball competitions.

== Results ==
=== Pan American Championship ===
Year	Round	Position	GP	W	D*	L	GS	GA
(Brazil) 1997	round robin	5th	5	0	1	4	62	144
(Dominican Republic) 2013	9th place game	10th	5	0	0	5	64	197

=== Central American and Caribbean Games ===
Games	Round	Position	Pld	W	D	L	GF	GA
(Colombia) 2018 Barranquilla	7th place game	7th	5	1	0	4	108	146
(El Salvador) 2023 San Salvador	7th place game	7th	5	2	0	3	114	117

=== Central American Games ===
Year	Round	Position	GP	W	D*	L	GS	GA
(Nicaragua) 2017	gold medal match	2nd	5	2	0	3	118	110

=== Central American Championship ===
Year	Round	Position	GP	W	D*	L	GS	GA
(Honduras) 2014	round robin	3rd	4	2	1	1	93	85
(Nicaragua) 2016	round robin	3rd	4	2	0	2	91	76
(El Salvador) 2021	round robin	2nd	2	1	0	1	48	46
(Nicaragua) 2023	round robin	4th	5	2	0	3	107	134
