= El Salvador women's national handball team =

El Salvador

Information
- Association: Federación Salvadoreña de Balonmano

Colours
1st	2nd

Results

South and Central American Championship
- Appearances: 1 (First in 2024)
- Best result: 6th (2024)
- Last updated on Unknown.

The El Salvador women's national handball team is the national team of El Salvador. It is governed by the Federación Salvadoreña de Balonmano, and takes part in international handball competitions.

== Results ==
=== South and Central American Championship ===
- 2024 – 6th

=== Central American Championship ===
- 2014 – 4th
- 2016 – 4th
- 2021 – 3rd
- 2023 – 5th
