= 2018 South and Central American Women's Handball Championship =

Tournament details
- Host country: Brazil
- Venue: 1 (in 1 host city)
- Dates: 29 November – 4 December
- Teams: 5 (from 1 confederation)

Final positions
- Champions: Brazil (1st title)
- Runners-up: Argentina
- Third place: Paraguay
- Fourth place: Chile

Tournament statistics
- Matches played: 10
- Goals scored: 487 (48.7 per match)
- Top scorers: (Brazil) Mariana Costa (25 goals)

The 2018 South and Central American Women's Handball Championship was the first edition of the South and Central American Women's Handball Championship, which took place in Maceió, Brazil from 29 November to 4 December 2018. It acted as the South and Central American qualifying tournament for the 2019 World Women's Handball Championship.

== Standings ==
Pos	Team	Pld	W	D	L	GF	GA	GD	Pts	Qualification
1st place, gold medalist(s)	Brazil (H)	4	4	0	0	131	54	+77	8	2019 World Championship
2nd place, silver medalist(s)	Argentina	4	3	0	1	108	92	+16	6	2019 World Championship
3rd place, bronze medalist(s)	Paraguay	4	1	0	3	97	116	−19	2 (Note: Paraguay 2 Pts, +6 GD; Chile 2 Pts, −2 GD; Uruguay 2 Pts, −4 GD)	
4	Chile	4	1	0	3	71	116	−45	2	
5	Uruguay	4	1	0	3	80	109	−29	2	

Rules for classification: 1) Points; 2) Head-to-head points; 3) Head-to-head goal difference; 4) Head-to-head goals scored; 5) Goal difference; 6) Goals scored; 7) Draw.
(H) Hosts

== Results ==
All times are local (UTC−3).

29 November 2018; 17:00	Argentina	28–26	Paraguay	Sesi Trapiche, Maceió; Attendance: 100; Referees: Lemos, Sosa (URU)
29 November 2018; 17:00	Mendoza, Pizzo 6	(16–16)	Fernández 10	Sesi Trapiche, Maceió; Attendance: 100; Referees: Lemos, Sosa (URU)
29 November 2018; 17:00	3× (yellow card) 5× (suspension) 1× (red card)	Report	1× (yellow card) 4× (suspension) 1× (red card)	Sesi Trapiche, Maceió; Attendance: 100; Referees: Lemos, Sosa (URU)

29 November 2018; 19:00	Chile	24–19	Uruguay	Sesi Trapiche, Maceió
29 November 2018; 19:00		(13–9)		Sesi Trapiche, Maceió

30 November 2018; 17:00	Chile	21–28	Paraguay	Sesi Trapiche, Maceió
30 November 2018; 17:00		(9–12)		Sesi Trapiche, Maceió

30 November 2018; 19:00	Brazil	28–9	Uruguay	Sesi Trapiche, Maceió
30 November 2018; 19:00		(11–3)		Sesi Trapiche, Maceió

1 December 2018; 17:00	Uruguay	25–31	Argentina	Sesi Trapiche, Maceió; Attendance: 400; Referees: Marques, Magalhães (BRA)
1 December 2018; 17:00	Barreiro 7	(10–16)	Casasola, Cavo 5	Sesi Trapiche, Maceió; Attendance: 400; Referees: Marques, Magalhães (BRA)
1 December 2018; 17:00	1× (yellow card) 3× (suspension)	Report	2× (yellow card) 3× (suspension)	Sesi Trapiche, Maceió; Attendance: 400; Referees: Marques, Magalhães (BRA)

1 December 2018; 19:00	Brazil	39–9	Chile	Sesi Trapiche, Maceió
1 December 2018; 19:00		(17–6)		Sesi Trapiche, Maceió

3 December 2018; 17:00	Argentina	30–17	Chile	Sesi Trapiche, Maceió; Attendance: 350; Referees: Lemos, Sosa (URU)
3 December 2018; 17:00	Cavo 5	(12–8)	Flores 4	Sesi Trapiche, Maceió; Attendance: 350; Referees: Lemos, Sosa (URU)
3 December 2018; 17:00	2× (yellow card) 1× (suspension)	Report	2× (yellow card) 4× (suspension) 1× (red card)	Sesi Trapiche, Maceió; Attendance: 350; Referees: Lemos, Sosa (URU)

3 December 2018; 19:00	Brazil	40–17	Paraguay	Sesi Trapiche, Maceió
3 December 2018; 19:00		(18–7)		Sesi Trapiche, Maceió

4 December 2018; 17:00	Paraguay	26–27	Uruguay	Sesi Trapiche, Maceió
4 December 2018; 17:00		(12–11)		Sesi Trapiche, Maceió

4 December 2018; 19:00	Brazil	24–19	Argentina	Sesi Trapiche, Maceió; Attendance: 3,500; Referees: Lemos, Sosa (URU)
4 December 2018; 19:00	Costa 6	(15–10)	Mendoza 6	Sesi Trapiche, Maceió; Attendance: 3,500; Referees: Lemos, Sosa (URU)
4 December 2018; 19:00	2× (yellow card) 3× (suspension)	Report	1× (yellow card) 1× (suspension)	Sesi Trapiche, Maceió; Attendance: 3,500; Referees: Lemos, Sosa (URU)
