= Pan American Women's Handball Championship =

- Sport: Handball
- Founded: 1986
- First season: 1986
- Folded: 2018
- Replaced by: Nor.Ca. Handball Championship; South and Central American Women's Handball Championship
- No. of teams: 12
- Continent: PATHF (Americas)
- Most titles: Brazil (10 titles)

The Pan American Women's Handball Championship was the biennial official competition for senior national handball teams of North, Center, Caribbean and South America. It was organized by the Pan-American Team Handball Federation. In addition to crowning the Pan-American champions, the tournament served as a qualifying tournament for the IHF World Women's Handball Championship. In 2018, the PATHF was folded and the tournament was replaced with the North American & Caribbean and South and Central American Women's Handball Championships.

== Summary ==
Year	Host	Final			Third place match			Teams
Year	Host	Champions	Score	Runners-up	Third place	Score	Fourth place	Teams
1986; Details	(Brazil); Novo Hamburgo	United States	Round-robin	Canada	Brazil	Round-robin	Argentina	6
1989; Details	(United States); Colorado Springs	Canada	Round-robin	United States	Brazil	Round-robin	Mexico	4
1991; Details	(Brazil); Maringá	United States	Round-robin	Canada	Brazil	Round-robin	Argentina	7
1997; Details	(Brazil); Poços de Caldas	Brazil	21–17	Canada	Uruguay	19–14	Argentina	6
1999; Details	(Argentina); Buenos Aires	Brazil	Round-robin	Cuba	Argentina	Round-robin	Uruguay	6
2000; Details	(Brazil); Aracaju	Brazil	Round-robin	Uruguay	Greenland	Round-robin	Argentina	6
2003; Details	(Brazil); São Bernardo do Campo	Brazil	39–12	Argentina	Uruguay	21–14	United States	7
2005; Details	(Brazil); São Bernardo do Campo	Brazil	Round-robin	Argentina	Uruguay	Round-robin	Canada	6
2007; Details	(Dominican Republic); Santo Domingo	Brazil	29–12	Argentina	Dominican Republic	25–24	Paraguay	8
2009; Details	(Chile); Santiago	Argentina	26–25 (ET)	Brazil	Chile	34–30 (2ET)	Dominican Republic	7
2011; Details	(Brazil); São Bernardo do Campo	Brazil	35–16	Argentina	Cuba	37–27	Uruguay	8
2013; Details	(Dominican Republic); Santo Domingo	Brazil	38–15	Argentina	Dominican Republic	28–19	Paraguay	10
2015; Details	(Cuba); Havana	Brazil	26–22	Cuba	Argentina	33–16	Puerto Rico	12
2017; Details	(Argentina); Villa Ballester	Brazil	38–20	Argentina	Paraguay	24–22	Uruguay	10

== Medal table ==
Rank	Nation	Gold	Silver	Bronze	Total
1	Brazil	10	1	3	14
2	United States	2	1	0	3
3	Argentina	1	6	2	9
4	Canada	1	3	0	4
5	Cuba	0	2	1	3
6	Uruguay	0	1	3	4
7	Dominican Republic	0	0	2	2
8	Chile	0	0	1	1
8	Greenland	0	0	1	1
8	Paraguay	0	0	1	1
Totals (10 entries)		14	14	14	42

== Participation history ==
Nation	(Brazil) 1986	(United States) 1989	(Brazil) 1991	(Brazil) 1997	(Argentina) 1999	(Brazil) 2000	(Brazil) 2003	(Brazil) 2005	(Dominican Republic) 2007	(Chile) 2009	(Brazil) 2011	(Dominican Republic) 2013	(Cuba) 2015	(Argentina) 2017	Years
Argentina	4th	–	4th	4th	3rd	4th	2nd	2nd	2nd	1st	2nd	2nd	3rd	2nd	13
Brazil	3rd	3rd	3rd	1st	1st	1st	1st	1st	1st	2nd	1st	1st	1st	1st	14
Canada	2nd	1st	2nd	2nd	–	–	5th	4th	6th	–	–	9th	–	–	8
Chile	–	–	–	–	–	–	–	–	–	3rd	5th	–	9th	7th	4
Colombia	–	–	–	–	6th	6th	–	–	–	–	–	–	–	9th	3
Costa Rica	–	–	–	5th	–	–	–	–	–	–	–	10th	–	–	2
Cuba	–	–	–	–	2nd	–	–	–	–	–	3rd	–	2nd	–	3
Dominican Republic	–	–	–	–	–	–	6th	5th	3rd	4th	6th	3rd	–	8th	7
Greenland	–	–	–	–	5th	3rd	–	–	–	–	–	–	6th	–	3
Guatemala	–	–	–	–	–	–	7th	–	–	–	–	–	12th	10th	3
Mexico	–	4th	–	6th	–	5th	–	–	8th	5th	7th	6th	8th	–	8
Paraguay	5th	–	5th	–	–	–	–	–	4th	7th	–	4th	7th	3rd	7
Puerto Rico	–	–	7th	–	–	–	–	–	–	–	–	–	4th	6th	3
Uruguay	6th	–	6th	3rd	4th	2nd	3rd	3rd	5th	6th	4th	5th	5th	4th	13
United States	1st	2nd	1st	–	–	–	4th	6th	7th	–	–	8th	10th	5th	9
Venezuela	–	–	–	–	–	–	–	–	–	–	8th	7th	11th	–	3
Total	6	4	7	6	6	6	7	6	8	7	8	10	12	10	
