= South and Central American Women's Handball Championship =

Official competition for Women's national handball teams of South and Central America

- Current season, competition or edition: 2024 South and Central American Women's Handball Championship
- Sport: Handball
- Founded: 2018
- First season: 2018
- No. of teams: 5–6
- Continent: SCAHC (South America/Central America)
- Most recent champion: Brazil (4th title)
- Most titles: Brazil (4 titles)

The South and Central American Women's Handball Championship is the official competition for senior national handball teams of South America and Central America, and takes place every two years. In addition to crowning the South and Central American champions, the tournament also serves as a qualifying tournament for the World Handball Championship. The first edition was held in 2018.

== Summaries ==
Year	Host	Final			Third place match		
Year	Host	Champion	Score	Runner-up	Third place	Score	Fourth place
2018; Details	Brazil	Brazil	Round-robin	Argentina	Paraguay	Round-robin	Chile
2021; Details	Paraguay	Brazil	Round-robin	Argentina	Paraguay	Round-robin	Uruguay
2022; Details	Argentina	Brazil	Round-robin	Argentina	Chile	Round-robin	Uruguay
2024; Details	Brazil	Brazil	Round-robin	Argentina	Uruguay	Round-robin	Paraguay
2026; Details	Brazil						

== Medal table ==
Rank	Nation	Gold	Silver	Bronze	Total
1	Brazil	4	0	0	4
2	Argentina	0	4	0	4
3	Paraguay	0	0	2	2
4	Chile	0	0	1	1
4	Uruguay	0	0	1	1
Totals (5 entries)		4	4	4	12

== Participating nations ==
Team	(Brazil) 2018	(Paraguay) 2021	(Argentina) 2022	(Brazil) 2024	(Brazil) 2026	Years
Argentina	2nd	2nd	2nd	2nd	Q	5
Bolivia	•	6th	•	•	•	1
Brazil	1st	1st	1st	1st	Q	5
Chile	4th	5th	3rd	5th	Q	5
El Salvador	•	•	•	6th	•	2
Guatemala	•	•	•	•	Q	1
Nicaragua	•	w/d	•	•	Q	1
Paraguay	3rd	3rd	5th	4th	Q	5
Uruguay	5th	4th	4th	3rd	Q	5
Total	5	6	5	6	7	
