= 2019 World Women's Handball Championship squads =

This article displays the squads for the 2019 World Women's Handball Championship. Each team consisted of up to 28 players, of whom 16 may be fielded for each match.

Age, club, caps and goals as of 30 November 2019.

== Group A ==
=== Angola ===
A 19-player squad was announced on 29 October 2019.

Head coach: (Denmark) Morten Soubak

No.	Pos.	Name	Date of birth (age)	Height	App.	Goals	Club
1	GK	Amália Pinto	12 June 1996 (aged 23)	1.76 m	0	0	(Angola) Primeiro de Agosto
4	P	Ruth João	17 October 1998 (aged 21)	1.82 m	6	0	(Angola) Primeiro de Agosto
6	LW	Vilma Silva	3 June 1997 (aged 22)	1.75 m	12	44	(Angola) Primeiro de Agosto
8	CB	Helena Paulo	24 January 1998 (aged 21)	1.76 m	38	107	(Angola) Primeiro de Agosto
9	CB	Natália Bernardo	25 December 1986 (aged 32)	1.70 m	106	189	(Angola) Primeiro de Agosto
10	P	Albertina Kassoma	12 June 1996 (aged 23)	1.94 m	64	116	(Angola) Primeiro de Agosto
12	GK	Helena Sousa	7 November 1994 (aged 25)	1.90 m	26	0	(Angola) Primeiro de Agosto
13	RW	Iracelma Silva	1 February 1991 (aged 28)	1.80 m	82	21	(Angola) Primeiro de Agosto
15	RB	Azenaide Carlos	14 June 1990 (aged 29)	1.71 m	84	226	(Angola) Petro de Luanda
16	GK	Teresa Almeida	5 April 1988 (aged 31)	1.84 m	92	0	(Angola) Petro de Luanda
17	RB	Wuta Dombaxe	5 April 1986 (aged 33)	1.81 m	67	42	(Angola) Primeiro de Agosto
21	LB	Magda Cazanga	28 May 1991 (aged 28)	1.77 m	44	84	(Angola) Petro de Luanda
23	RW	Juliana Machado	6 November 1994 (aged 25)	1.70 m	50	85	(Angola) Primeiro de Agosto
25	P	Liliana Venâncio	19 September 1995 (aged 24)	1.91 m	25	24	(Angola) Primeiro de Agosto
31	LW	Janete dos Santos	10 June 1991 (aged 28)	1.77 m	36	32	(Angola) Primeiro de Agosto
90	CB	Isabel Guialo	8 April 1990 (aged 29)	1.80 m	67	185	(Angola) Primeiro de Agosto

=== Cuba ===
Head coach: Jorge Coll

No.	Pos.	Name	Date of birth (age)	Height	App.	Goals	Club
1	GK	Niurkis Mora	6 October 1994 (aged 25)	1.78 m	36	6	Santiago de Cuba
4	RW	Liliamnis Rosabal	3 July 1999 (aged 20)	1.67 m	22	22	(Cuba) Granma
5	LB	Schakira Robert	5 September 1996 (aged 23)	1.77 m	20	29	(Cuba) La Habana
8	P	Arisleidy Márquez	24 November 1993 (aged 26)	1.82 m	20	16	(Cuba) Pinar del Rio
9	LW	Lizandra Lusson	1 September 1985 (aged 34)	1.80 m	210	1050	(Spain) BM Remudas
10	RB	Gleinys Reyes	31 July 1989 (aged 30)	1.71 m	36	103	(Spain) Adesal Cordoba
11	P	Yunisleidy Camejo	15 February 1990 (aged 29)	1.83 m	43	75	(Spain) BM Aula Cultural
12	GK	Indiana Cedeño	29 July 1997 (aged 22)	1.72 m	22	0	Santiago de Cuba
14	LB	Nahomis Mustelier	8 September 2000 (aged 19)	1.67 m	5	2	Santiago de Cuba
16	GK	Danielys Herranz	26 January 1999 (aged 20)	1.76 m	20	0	(Cuba) Matanzas
18	RW	Lorena Téllez	26 November 1996 (aged 23)	1.82 m	24	42	(Spain) BM La Calzada
23	LB	Eyatne Rizo	18 October 1995 (aged 24)	1.65 m	32	84	(France) Fleury Loiret HB
24	LW	Nahomi Márquez	20 September 2000 (aged 19)	1.83 m	20	18	(Italy) Pallamano Trieste
34	LW	Yennifer Toledo	1 October 2000 (aged 19)	1.82 m	20	24	(Cuba) Villa Clara
55	CB	Yarumy Céspedes	2 January 1996 (aged 23)	1.70 m	20	9	(Cuba) Matanzas
77	RW	Rosa Leal	26 December 1996 (aged 22)	1.77 m	10	11	(Cuba) La Habana

=== Netherlands ===
An 18-player squad was announced on 4 November 2019.

Head coach: (France) Emmanuel Mayonnade

No.	Pos.	Name	Date of birth (age)	Height	App.	Goals	Club
5	LB	Jessy Kramer	16 February 1990 (aged 29)	1.78 m	132	98	(France) Toulon
6	RB	Laura van der Heijden	27 June 1990 (aged 29)	1.72 m	203	626	(Germany) SG BBM Bietigheim
7	RW	Debbie Bont	9 December 1990 (aged 28)	1.75 m	158	316	(Denmark) København Håndbold
8	LB	Lois Abbingh	13 August 1992 (aged 27)	1.77 m	142	613	(Russia) Rostov-Don
9	CB	Larissa Nüsser	8 February 2000 (aged 19)	1.75 m	11	14	(Denmark) København Håndbold
10	P	Danick Snelder	22 May 1990 (aged 29)	1.78 m	164	385	(Hungary) FTC Rail-Cargo Hungaria
12	LW	Bo van Wetering	10 May 1999 (aged 20)	1.72 m	5	19	(Germany) TuS Metzingen
14	CB	Delaila Amega	21 September 1997 (aged 22)	1.72 m	20	33	(Germany) TuS Metzingen
18	LB	Kelly Dulfer	21 March 1994 (aged 25)	1.85 m	105	104	(Germany) Borussia Dortmund
19	P	Merel Freriks	6 January 1998 (aged 21)	1.75 m	21	26	(Germany) Borussia Dortmund
20	LB	Inger Smits	17 September 1994 (aged 25)	1.79 m	23	17	(Germany) Borussia Dortmund
24	LW	Martine Smeets	5 May 1990 (aged 29)	1.72 m	98	177	(Norway) Molde Elite
26	RW	Angela Malestein	31 January 1993 (aged 26)	1.70 m	135	287	(Germany) SG BBM Bietigheim
30	GK	Rinka Duijndam	6 August 1997 (aged 22)	1.78 m	17	0	(Germany) Borussia Dortmund
33	GK	Tess Wester	19 May 1993 (aged 26)	1.78 m	97	8	(Denmark) Odense Håndbold
41	GK	Annick Lipman	13 March 1989 (aged 30)	1.78 m	3	0	(Norway) Byåsen HE
48	RB	Dione Housheer	26 September 1999 (aged 20)	1.80 m	12	23	(Denmark) Nykøbing Falster Håndboldklub
79	CB	Estavana Polman	5 August 1992 (aged 27)	1.73 m	134	488	(Denmark) Team Esbjerg

=== Norway ===
The squad was announced on 4 November 2019. On 11 December, Kristine Breistøl replaced Helene Gigstad Fauske in the squad.

Head coach: (Iceland) Thorir Hergeirsson

No.	Pos.	Name	Date of birth (age)	Height	App.	Goals	Club
3	LB	Emilie Hegh Arntzen	1 January 1994 (aged 25)	1.84 m	93	143	(Norway) Vipers Kristiansand
6	P	Heidi Løke	12 December 1982 (aged 36)	1.73 m	205	759	(Norway) Vipers Kristiansand
7	RB	Stine Skogrand	3 March 1993 (aged 26)	1.73 m	72	114	(Denmark) Herning-Ikast Håndbold
8	RB	Silje Waade	20 March 1994 (aged 25)	1.83 m	35	42	(Norway) Vipers Kristiansand
10	CB	Stine Bredal Oftedal	25 September 1991 (aged 28)	1.68 m	177	441	(Hungary) Győri Audi ETO KC
11	RW	Malin Aune	4 March 1995 (aged 24)	1.65 m	49	85	(Norway) Vipers Kristiansand
12	GK	Silje Solberg	16 June 1990 (aged 29)	1.78 m	135	1	(Hungary) Siófok KC
13	P	Kari Brattset Dale	15 February 1991 (aged 28)	1.83 m	53	108	(Hungary) Győri Audi ETO KC
16	GK	Andrea Austmo Pedersen	19 April 1994 (aged 25)	1.80 m	7	0	(Norway) Vipers Kristiansand
17	LB	Helene Gigstad Fauske	31 January 1997 (aged 22)	1.78 m	26	16	(Denmark) Herning-Ikast Håndbold
19	RB	Moa Högdahl	14 March 1996 (aged 23)	1.78 m	12	21	(Denmark) Viborg HK
20	RW	Marit Røsberg Jacobsen	25 February 1994 (aged 25)	1.65 m	50	94	(Denmark) Team Esbjerg
21	LB	Ingvild Bakkerud	9 July 1995 (aged 24)	1.87 m	15	28	(Denmark) Odense Håndbold
23	LW	Camilla Herrem	8 October 1986 (aged 33)	1.67 m	237	630	(Norway) Sola HK
24	LW	Sanna Solberg-Isaksen	16 June 1990 (aged 29)	1.78 m	136	250	(Denmark) Team Esbjerg
25	LB	Kristine Breistøl	23 August 1993 (aged 26)	1.91 m	3	4	(Denmark) Team Esbjerg
26	CB	Marta Tomac	20 September 1990 (aged 29)	1.79 m	59	59	(Norway) Vipers Kristiansand

=== Serbia ===
The squad was announced on 14 November 2019.

Head coach: Ljubomir Obradović

No.	Pos.	Name	Date of birth (age)	Height	App.	Goals	Club
2	LW	Sanja Radosavljević	15 January 1994 (aged 25)	1.71 m	65	189	(Hungary) Váci NKSE
5	LB	Jelena Trifunović	4 August 1991 (aged 28)	1.80 m	62	88	(Romania) SCM Craiova
8	RB	Dijana Števin	23 October 1986 (aged 33)	1.77 m	81	130	(France) HBC Celles-sur-Belle
9	RB	Jelena Lavko	6 July 1991 (aged 28)	1.82 m	104	229	(Hungary) Érd NK
14	RW	Željka Nikolić	12 July 1991 (aged 28)	1.64 m	41	63	(Romania) SCM Craiova
15	RB	Anđela Janjušević	18 June 1995 (aged 24)	1.78 m	38	41	(Hungary) Siófok KC
16	GK	Jovana Risović	7 October 1993 (aged 26)	1.71 m	30	2	(Croatia) RK Podravka Koprivnica
17	RW	Ana Kojić	4 October 1997 (aged 22)	1.63 m	2	2	(Slovenia) RK Krim
20	P	Slađana Pop-Lazić	26 July 1988 (aged 31)	1.78 m	96	267	(France) Brest Bretagne Handball
21	LW	Dijana Radojević	2 April 1990 (aged 29)	1.68 m	50	74	(France) Mérignac Handball
23	LB	Marija Obradović	6 August 1992 (aged 27)	1.78 m	36	87	(Germany) TuS Metzingen
25	LB	Jovana Jovović	4 December 2001 (aged 17)	1.77 m	2	1	(Hungary) Dunaújvárosi KKA
27	GK	Katarina Tomašević	6 February 1984 (aged 35)	1.78 m	105	2	(Hungary) Szombathelyi KKA
33	LB	Jovana Stoiljković	30 September 1988 (aged 31)	1.81 m	96	264	(France) Chambray
71	CB	Kristina Liščević	20 October 1989 (aged 30)	1.73 m	89	196	(Romania) SCM Râmnicu Vâlcea
72	P	Dragana Cvijić	15 March 1990 (aged 29)	1.83 m	82	254	(Romania) CSM București

=== Slovenia ===
The squad was announced on 7 November 2019.

Head coach: Uroš Bregar

No.	Pos.	Name	Date of birth (age)	Height	App.	Goals	Club
1	GK	Branka Zec	30 October 1986 (aged 33)	1.79 m	64	0	(Germany) Frisch Auf Göppingen
2	P	Valentina Klemenčič	5 February 2002 (aged 17)	1.85 m	3	4	(Slovenia) RK Krim
5	RB	Anika Strnad	11 June 1998 (aged 21)	1.73 m	5	6	(Slovenia) RK Žalec
6	RB	Ana Gros	21 January 1991 (aged 28)	1.86 m	109	418	(France) Brest Bretagne Handball
9	CB	Nina Žabjek	4 March 1998 (aged 21)	1.78 m	23	23	(Slovenia) RK Krim
10	LB	Tjaša Stanko	5 November 1997 (aged 22)	1.73 m	56	235	(Croatia) RK Podravka Koprivnica
11	LB	Ana Abina	30 July 1997 (aged 22)	1.75 m	38	30	(Slovenia) ŽRK Krka
13	LW	Polona Barič	15 May 1992 (aged 27)	1.66 m	38	43	(Slovenia) RK Krim
15	P	Teja Ferfolja	20 September 1991 (aged 28)	1.83 m	66	51	(Greece) PAOK
16	GK	Maja Vojnović	26 January 1998 (aged 21)	1.80 m	24	0	(Slovenia) RK Krim
17	P	Nataša Ljepoja	28 January 1996 (aged 23)	1.78 m	16	9	(Slovenia) RK Krim
18	CB	Nina Zulić	4 December 1995 (aged 23)	1.70 m	40	95	(Slovenia) RK Krim
19	RW	Jasmina Pišek	24 May 1996 (aged 23)	1.66 m	13	17	(Slovenia) ŽRK Celje
21	GK	Amra Pandžić	20 September 1989 (aged 30)	1.78 m	48	0	(Turkey) Kastamonu Belediyesi
23	LB	Hana Vučko	14 November 1998 (aged 21)	1.75 m	23	24	(Slovenia) RK Krim
28	LW	Maja Svetik	9 March 1996 (aged 23)	1.67 m	7	10	(Slovenia) ŽRK Ajdovščina
41	P	Aneja Beganovič	9 November 1997 (aged 22)	1.73 m	32	53	(France) Nantes Handball

== Group B ==
=== Australia ===
The squad was announced on 24 November 2019.

Head coach: (Egypt) Heba Aly

No.	Pos.	Name	Date of birth (age)	Height	App.	Goals	Club
1	GK	Jemima Harbort	4 September 1987 (aged 32)	1.80 m	40	0	(Australia) Queensland HC
5	RW	Jessica Fallah	10 July 1999 (aged 20)	1.70 m	6	3	(Australia) UTS Handball Club
7	P	Ana Meded	19 March 1996 (aged 23)	1.77 m	18	20	(Australia) Melbourne HC
8	LB	Sally Potocki	11 February 1989 (aged 30)	1.78 m	25	110	(Germany) Bayer Leverkusen
11	CB	Emma Guignard	2 May 1989 (aged 30)	1.65 m	25	44	(Australia) Harbourside HC
12	P	Laura Player	25 July 1991 (aged 28)	1.75 m	8	8	(Australia) Harbourside HC
13	GK	Manon Vernay	7 January 1989 (aged 30)	1.74 m	10	0	(Germany) HSV Solingen-Gräfrath
14	CB	Madeleine McAfee	5 February 1993 (aged 26)	1.70 m	41	170	(Australia) UTS Handball Club
16	P	Rosalie Boyd	21 October 1987 (aged 32)	1.78 m	48	30	(Australia) Queensland HC
17	LW	Jessie Wood	17 March 1997 (aged 22)	1.55 m	6	8	(Australia) UTS Handball Club
19	GK	Amy Thomas	2 September 2000 (aged 19)	1.76 m	6	0	(Australia) UTS-UC Hawks
21	LB	Manon Livingstone	28 January 1997 (aged 22)	1.63 m	5	6	(France) OGC Nice
22	LW	Heather Cooper	9 May 1995 (aged 24)	1.67 m	11	15	(Australia) Queensland HC
25	LW	Olivia Mowat	2 May 1994 (aged 25)	1.68 m	8	6	(Australia) UTS Handball Club
27	LW	Theresa Fitzgerald	6 August 1995 (aged 24)	1.65 m	0	0	(Australia) Melbourne HC
30	RW	Brianna Keyes	30 September 1993 (aged 26)	1.63 m	7	10	Hong Kong HC

=== Brazil ===
The squad was announced on 7 November 2019.

Head coach: (Spain) Jorge Dueñas

No.	Pos.	Name	Date of birth (age)	Height	App.	Goals	Club
1	GK	Gabriela Dias Moreschi	8 July 1994 (aged 25)	1.90 m	36	0	(France) Fleury Loiret HB
2	RB	Bruna de Paula	26 September 1996 (aged 23)	1.73 m	48	117	(France) Fleury Loiret HB
3	RW	Alexandra do Nascimento	16 September 1981 (aged 38)	1.77 m	189	733	(Hungary) Érd HC
7	P	Tamires Morena Lima	16 May 1994 (aged 25)	1.83 m	95	130	(Romania) Dunărea Brăila
9	CB	Ana Paula Belo	18 October 1987 (aged 32)	1.72 m	183	689	(Russia) Rostov-Don
12	GK	Bárbara Arenhart	4 October 1986 (aged 33)	1.81 m	159	10	(Hungary) Váci NKSE
18	LB	Eduarda Amorim	23 September 1986 (aged 33)	1.86 m	197	654	(Hungary) Győri Audi ETO KC
20	LW	Larissa Araújo	1 July 1992 (aged 27)	1.67 m	44	89	(Romania) Universitatea Cluj-Napoca
21	RW	Adriana Cardoso de Castro	29 October 1990 (aged 29)	1.67 m	24	70	(Spain) BM Bera Bera
22	LB	Samara Vieira	7 October 1991 (aged 28)	1.83 m	15	30	(Romania) SCM Râmnicu Vâlcea
24	P	Isaura Menin	1 June 1994 (aged 25)	1.85 m	11	3	(Spain) CBF Málaga
30	RB	Gabriela Bitolo	1 April 1999 (aged 20)	1.80 m	3	1	(Brazil) EC Pinheiros
33	LB	Jaqueline Anastácio	9 November 1987 (aged 32)	1.74 m	83	151	(Romania) Măgura Cisnădie
48	CB	Patrícia Matieli	8 November 1988 (aged 31)	1.68 m	38	41	(Poland) MKS Lublin
81	RB	Deonise Fachinello	20 June 1983 (aged 36)	1.80 m	200	424	(France) Bourg de Péage
87	GK	Renata Arruda	18 February 1999 (aged 20)	1.78 m	17	2	(Spain) BM Bera Bera
88	RW	Mariana Costa	14 October 1992 (aged 27)	1.66 m	56	162	(Romania) Gloria Bistrița
96	LW	Ana Cláudia Bolzan	15 July 1996 (aged 23)	1.78 m	13	21	(Brazil) EC Pinheiros

=== Denmark ===
The squad was announced on 18 October 2019. On 9 December, Mia Rej replaced Simone Böhme in the squad.

Head coach: Klavs Bruun Jørgensen

No.	Pos.	Name	Date of birth (age)	Height	App.	Goals	Club
1	GK	Sandra Toft	18 October 1989 (aged 30)	1.74 m	113	1	(France) Brest Bretagne Handball
3	LW	Lærke Nolsøe	19 February 1996 (aged 23)	1.69 m	23	36	(Denmark) Nykøbing Falster Håndboldklub
5	P	Sarah Iversen	10 April 1990 (aged 29)	1.74 m	44	55	(Denmark) Herning-Ikast Håndbold
8	LB	Anne Mette Hansen	25 August 1994 (aged 25)	1.85 m	86	227	(Hungary) Győri Audi ETO KC
10	P	Kathrine Heindahl	26 March 1992 (aged 27)	1.85 m	63	129	(Denmark) Odense Håndbold
11	LB	Line Haugsted	11 November 1994 (aged 25)	1.80 m	39	54	(Denmark) Viborg HK
13	RW	Simone Böhme	17 August 1991 (aged 28)	1.69 m	27	29	(Hungary) Siófok KC
14	CB	Lotte Grigel	5 April 1991 (aged 28)	1.65 m	102	146	(France) Nantes Loire Atlantique Handball
17	P	Stine Bodholt	8 November 1989 (aged 30)	1.77 m	63	104	(France) Nantes Loire Atlantique Handball
23	LB	Kristina Jørgensen	17 January 1998 (aged 21)	1.89 m	31	41	(Denmark) Viborg HK
24	CB	Mia Rej	2 February 1990 (aged 29)	1.68 m	13	18	(Denmark) København Håndbold
25	RW	Trine Østergaard	17 October 1991 (aged 28)	1.66 m	109	180	(Denmark) Odense Håndbold
27	RB	Louise Burgaard	17 October 1992 (aged 27)	1.75 m	98	212	(Denmark) Herning-Ikast Håndbold
28	LB	Stine Jørgensen	3 September 1990 (aged 29)	1.80 m	140	455	(Denmark) Odense Håndbold
32	CB	Mie Højlund	24 October 1997 (aged 22)	1.73 m	24	27	(Denmark) Odense Håndbold
36	LW	Freja Cohrt	20 January 1994 (aged 25)	1.68 m	19	40	(Denmark) Odense Håndbold
40	GK	Althea Reinhardt	1 September 1996 (aged 23)	1.80 m	44	0	(Denmark) Odense Håndbold

=== France ===
A 20-player squad was announced on 7 November 2019.

Head coach: Olivier Krumbholz

No.	Pos.	Name	Date of birth (age)	Height	App.	Goals	Club
2	CB	Méline Nocandy	25 February 1998 (aged 21)	1.74 m	7	16	(France) Metz Handball
4	RW	Pauline Coatanea	6 July 1993 (aged 26)	1.74 m	27	33	(France) Brest Bretagne Handball
5	RB	Camille Ayglon	21 May 1985 (aged 34)	1.80 m	366	549	(France) Nantes Loire Atlantique Handball
6	LW	Chloé Bouquet	19 April 1995 (aged 24)	1.65 m	5	20	(France) ESBF Besançon
7	CB	Allison Pineau	2 May 1989 (aged 30)	1.81 m	242	600	(France) Paris 92
9	P	Astride N'Gouan	9 July 1991 (aged 28)	1.87 m	41	35	(France) Brest Bretagne Handball
10	CB	Grâce Zaadi	7 July 1993 (aged 26)	1.71 m	108	152	(France) Metz Handball
12	GK	Amandine Leynaud	2 May 1986 (aged 33)	1.78 m	228	3	(Hungary) Győri Audi ETO KC
13	LW	Manon Houette	2 July 1992 (aged 27)	1.68 m	97	235	(France) Metz Handball
19	RB	Océane Sercien-Ugolin	15 December 1997 (aged 21)	1.83 m	4	8	(France) Paris 92
20	RB	Laura Flippes	13 December 1994 (aged 24)	1.71 m	58	97	(France) Metz Handball
21	LB	Orlane Kanor	16 June 1997 (aged 22)	1.79 m	34	54	(France) Metz Handball
22	LB	Tamara Horacek	5 November 1995 (aged 24)	1.78 m	21	9	(France) Paris 92
24	P	Béatrice Edwige	3 October 1988 (aged 31)	1.82 m	96	59	(Hungary) Győri Audi ETO KC
26	P	Pauletta Foppa	22 December 2000 (aged 18)	1.70 m	15	9	(France) Brest Bretagne Handball
27	CB	Estelle Nze Minko	11 August 1991 (aged 28)	1.78 m	106	224	(Hungary) Győri Audi ETO KC
29	CB	Gnonsiane Niombla	9 July 1990 (aged 29)	1.72 m	103	227	(Hungary) Siófok KC
64	LB	Alexandra Lacrabère	27 April 1987 (aged 32)	1.77 m	231	763	(France) Fleury Loiret HB
94	GK	Catherine Gabriel	4 September 1994 (aged 25)	1.72 m	9	0	(France) Nantes Loire Atlantique Handball

=== Germany ===
A 17-player squad was announced on 29 October 2019.

Head coach: (Netherlands) Henk Groener

No.	Pos.	Name	Date of birth (age)	Height	App.	Goals	Club
3	RW	Amelie Berger	22 July 1999 (aged 20)	1.69 m	15	22	(Germany) SG BBM Bietigheim
4	CB	Alina Grijseels	12 April 1996 (aged 23)	1.74 m	20	27	(Germany) Borussia Dortmund
7	P	Meike Schmelzer	19 July 1993 (aged 26)	1.80 m	51	61	(Germany) Thüringer HC
12	GK	Dinah Eckerle	16 October 1995 (aged 24)	1.71 m	42	1	(Germany) SG BBM Bietigheim
13	P	Julia Behnke	28 March 1993 (aged 26)	1.80 m	70	118	(Russia) Rostov-Don
15	CB	Kim Naidzinavicius	6 April 1991 (aged 28)	1.85 m	101	242	(Germany) SG BBM Bietigheim
16	GK	Isabell Roch	26 July 1990 (aged 29)	1.74 m	22	0	(Germany) Borussia Dortmund
17	RB	Alicia Stolle	17 June 1996 (aged 23)	1.82 m	46	93	(Germany) Thüringer HC
18	CB	Mia Zschocke	28 May 1998 (aged 21)	1.78 m	18	8	(Germany) Bayer Leverkusen
20	LB	Emily Bölk	26 April 1998 (aged 21)	1.82 m	46	129	(Germany) Thüringer HC
21	LW	Ina Großmann	21 August 1990 (aged 29)	1.70 m	24	41	(Germany) Thüringer HC
22	RB	Maren Weigel	22 May 1994 (aged 25)	1.77 m	20	23	(Germany) TuS Metzingen
29	P	Antje Lauenroth	3 October 1988 (aged 31)	1.70 m	18	29	(Germany) SG BBM Bietigheim
30	RW	Jenny Behrend	20 January 1996 (aged 23)	1.72 m	8	10	(Germany) VfL Oldenburg
32	LB	Ewgenija Minevskaja	31 October 1992 (aged 27)	1.83 m	79	127	(France) Brest Bretagne Handball
33	P	Luisa Schulze	14 September 1990 (aged 29)	1.90 m	86	109	(Germany) SG BBM Bietigheim

=== South Korea ===
Head coach: Kang Jae-won

No.	Pos.	Name	Date of birth (age)	Height	App.	Goals	Club
1	GK	Kim Su-yeon	2 June 1998 (aged 21)	1.82 m	5		(South Korea) Korea National Sports University
2	RW	Kim Seon-hwa	7 January 1991 (aged 28)	1.60 m	8		(South Korea) SK Sugar Gliders
6	LW	Choi Su-ji	10 April 1995 (aged 24)	1.62 m	10		(South Korea) SK Sugar Gliders
7	LW	Shin Eun-joo	9 September 1993 (aged 26)	1.70 m	8		(South Korea) Incheon City
10	P	Won Seon-pil	6 August 1994 (aged 25)	1.74 m	5		(South Korea) Incheon City
11	RB	Ryu Eun-hee	24 February 1990 (aged 29)	1.79 m	20		(France) Paris 92
13	LB	Han Mi-seul	13 August 1993 (aged 26)	1.77 m	6		(South Korea) Wonderful Samcheok
16	GK	Park Sae-young	11 August 1994 (aged 25)	1.76 m	15		(South Korea) GNDC
17	LB	Sim Hae-in	31 October 1987 (aged 32)	1.78 m	16		(South Korea) Busan BISCO
19	P	Kang Eun-hye	17 April 1996 (aged 23)	1.86 m	8		(South Korea) Busan BISCO
20	CB	Gwon Han-na	22 November 1989 (aged 30)	1.73 m	16		(South Korea) Busan BISCO
23	CB	Lee Mi-gyeong	2 October 1991 (aged 28)	1.70 m	11		(South Korea) Busan BISCO
24	RW	Jung Ji-in	18 July 2000 (aged 19)	1.80 m	5		(South Korea) Korea National Sports University
26	P	Kim So-ra	23 March 1998 (aged 21)	1.80 m	0		(South Korea) Korea National Sports University
29	RB	Yu So-jeong	4 June 1996 (aged 23)	1.68 m	13		(South Korea) SK Sugar Gliders
31	RB	Moon Su-hyeon	25 March 1998 (aged 21)	1.73 m	5		(South Korea) Korea National Sports University

== Group C ==
=== Hungary ===
A 28-player squad was announced on 3 November 2019. An 18-player squad was announced on 11 November 2019.

Head Coach: (Denmark) Kim Rasmussen

No.	Pos.	Name	Date of birth (age)	Height	App.	Goals	Club
1	GK	Ágnes Triffa	18 January 1987 (aged 32)	1.76 m	27	0	(Hungary) DVSC-Schaeffler
4	P	Petra Tóvizi	15 March 1999 (aged 20)	1.78 m	14	21	(Hungary) DVSC-Schaeffler
6	LW	Nadine Schatzl	19 November 1993 (aged 26)	1.74 m	51	131	(Hungary) FTC-Rail Cargo Hungaria
8	CB	Anikó Kovacsics	29 August 1991 (aged 28)	1.70 m	118	248	(Hungary) FTC-Rail Cargo Hungaria
10	RB	Katrin Klujber	21 April 1999 (aged 20)	1.70 m	5	33	(Hungary) FTC-Rail Cargo Hungaria
16	GK	Blanka Bíró	22 September 1994 (aged 25)	1.87 m	62	1	(Hungary) FTC-Rail Cargo Hungaria
19	LW	Gréta Márton	3 October 1999 (aged 20)	1.73 m	4	8	(Hungary) FTC-Rail Cargo Hungaria
21	GK	Éva Kiss	7 November 1987 (aged 32)	1.89 m	93	1	(Hungary) Győri Audi ETO KC
23	RB	Nikolett Kiss	23 July 1996 (aged 23)	1.82 m	8	10	(Hungary) Érd HC
33	RB	Anna Kovács	24 October 1991 (aged 28)	1.73 m	42	126	(Hungary) DVSC-Schaeffler
38	CB	Petra Vámos	14 September 2000 (aged 19)	1.75 m	0	0	(Hungary) DVSC-Schaeffler
45	LB	Noémi Háfra	5 October 1998 (aged 21)	1.80 m	31	83	(Hungary) FTC-Rail Cargo Hungaria
48	RW	Dorottya Faluvégi	31 March 1998 (aged 21)	1.68 m	9	20	(Hungary) Győri Audi ETO KC
64	P	Noémi Pásztor	2 April 1999 (aged 20)	1.78 m	1	1	(Hungary) FTC-Rail Cargo Hungaria
66	RW	Viktória Lukács	31 October 1995 (aged 24)	1.68 m	44	90	(Hungary) FTC-Rail Cargo Hungaria
68	P	Laura Szabó	19 November 1997 (aged 22)	1.85 m	16	23	(Hungary) Érd HC
87	LB	Zsuzsanna Tomori	18 June 1987 (aged 32)	1.87 m	157	430	(Hungary) Siófok KC
96	CB	Gabriella Tóth	23 September 1996 (aged 23)	1.74 m	39	80	(Hungary) Érd HC

=== Kazakhstan ===
Head coach: Berik Beknazarov

No.	Pos.	Name	Date of birth (age)	Height	App.	Goals	Club
1	GK	Iulia Poilova	9 November 1988 (aged 31)	1.85 m	5	0	(Kazakhstan) USC Dostyk
3	LB	Mariya Sitnikova	10 November 1998 (aged 21)	1.65 m	20	46	(Kazakhstan) Kazygurt Handball
4	LB	Sevara Rejemetova	1 January 1994 (aged 25)	1.65 m	40	121	(Kazakhstan) Kazygurt Handball
5	RW	Marina Pikalova	16 March 1985 (aged 34)	1.63 m	112	587	(Kazakhstan) USC Dostyk
7	LB	Lunara Syzdykova	20 January 2000 (aged 19)	1.65 m	40	124	(Kazakhstan) USC Dostyk
8	P	Valentina Sitnikova	10 November 1998 (aged 21)	1.65 m	15	34	(Kazakhstan) Kazygurt Handball
9	LW	Veronika Khardina	29 August 1996 (aged 23)	1.75 m	50	240	(Kazakhstan) Kaysar Club
10	P	Irina Baranovskaya	2 July 1986 (aged 33)	1.80 m	15	114	(Kazakhstan) USC Dostyk
12	GK	Zhannat Aitenova	5 November 1989 (aged 30)	1.80 m	60	0	(Kazakhstan) Kaysar Club
14	P	Arailym Abdikhamit	3 March 1999 (aged 20)	1.95 m	35	68	(Kazakhstan) Kazygurt Handball
15	LW	Irina Alexandrova	2 October 1994 (aged 25)	1.83 m	70	425	(Kazakhstan) USC Dostyk
16	GK	Tatyana Davydova	26 June 2000 (aged 19)	1.73 m	20	0	(Kazakhstan) Kaysar Club
17	RB	Zhanerke Seitkassym	5 December 2002 (aged 16)	1.68 m	10	80	(Kazakhstan) Kaysar Club
77	P	Tansholpan Jumadilova	18 July 1998 (aged 21)	1.65 m	40	120	(Kazakhstan) Kazygurt Handball
96	P	Dana Abilda	18 October 1996 (aged 23)	1.67 m	60	327	(Kazakhstan) Kaysar Club
99	RB	Mariya Pupchenkova	10 March 1998 (aged 21)	1.75 m	40	98	(Kazakhstan) Kaysar Club

=== Montenegro ===
A 20-player squad was announced on 17 November 2019. A 17-player squad was revealed on 19 November 2019. The same day, the squad was reduced to 16 players, as it was announced that Ivona Pavićević would not participate, due to doping investigations.

Head coach: (Sweden) Per Johansson

No.	Pos.	Name	Date of birth (age)	Height	App.	Goals	Club
1	GK	Marina Rajčić	24 August 1993 (aged 26)	1.78 m	115	1	(Montenegro) ŽRK Budućnost
4	RW	Jovanka Radičević	23 October 1986 (aged 33)	1.69 m	152	820	(Montenegro) ŽRK Budućnost
9	LB	Đurđina Jauković	24 February 1997 (aged 22)	1.85 m	55	168	(Montenegro) ŽRK Budućnost
15	RB	Andrea Klikovac	5 May 1991 (aged 28)	1.80 m	68	32	(Romania) CSM București
16	GK	Ljubica Nenezić	15 January 1997 (aged 22)	1.79 m	18	0	(Romania) Gloria Bistrița
20	RB	Nikolina Knežević	2 July 2000 (aged 19)	1.83 m	2	1	(Montenegro) ŽRK Budućnost
23	RW	Dijana Ujkić	5 July 1996 (aged 23)	1.72 m	25	28	(Romania) Măgura Cisnădie
27	RB	Sanja Premović	27 November 1992 (aged 27)	1.82 m	28	4	(Montenegro) ŽRK Budućnost
32	RB	Katarina Bulatović	15 November 1984 (aged 35)	1.90 m	85	460	(Hungary) Győri Audi ETO KC
34	P	Tatjana Brnović	9 November 1998 (aged 21)	1.84 m	22	18	(Montenegro) ŽRK Budućnost
43	GK	Marta Batinović	20 April 1990 (aged 29)	1.88 m	2	0	(Romania) SCM Râmnicu Vâlcea
55	LW	Dijana Mugoša	22 October 1995 (aged 24)	1.69 m	5	4	(Croatia) RK Podravka
66	P	Ema Ramusović	28 November 1996 (aged 23)	1.87 m	51	44	(Montenegro) ŽRK Budućnost
77	LW	Majda Mehmedović	25 May 1990 (aged 29)	1.69 m	111	285	(Montenegro) ŽRK Budućnost
80	LB	Jelena Despotović	30 April 1994 (aged 25)	1.83 m	71	60	(Hungary) Debreceni VSC
90	CB	Milena Raičević	12 March 1990 (aged 29)	1.78 m	145	450	(Montenegro) ŽRK Budućnost
96	CB	Itana Grbić	1 September 1996 (aged 23)	1.69 m	41	45	(Romania) CSM București

=== Romania ===
An 18-player squad was announced on 7 November 2019. A final 17-player squad was revealed on 20 November 2019.

Head coach: (Sweden) Tomas Ryde

No.	Pos.	Name	Date of birth (age)	Height	App.	Goals	Club
2	RW	Aneta Udriștioiu	22 June 1989 (aged 30)	1.65 m	55	54	(Romania) Dunărea Brăila
4	CB	Laura Pristăviță	20 July 1989 (aged 30)	1.75 m	28	17	(Romania) Gloria Bistrița
8	LB	Cristina Neagu	26 August 1988 (aged 31)	1.80 m	190	781	(Romania) CSM București
9	P	Raluca Băcăoanu	2 May 1989 (aged 30)	1.77 m	17	14	(Romania) SCM Râmnicu Vâlcea
11	LB	Gabriela Perianu	20 June 1994 (aged 25)	1.88 m	57	78	(Romania) CSM București
12	GK	Diana Ciucă	1 June 2000 (aged 19)	1.80 m	2	0	(Romania) SCM Râmnicu Vâlcea
16	GK	Denisa Dedu	27 September 1994 (aged 25)	1.82 m	51	3	(Romania) CSM București
20	GK	Iulia Dumanska	15 August 1996 (aged 23)	1.78 m	37	0	(Romania) SCM Râmnicu Vâlcea
21	P	Crina Pintea	3 April 1990 (aged 29)	1.92 m	71	99	(Romania) CSM București
22	LW	Elena Florica	11 May 1992 (aged 27)	1.70 m	37	29	(Romania) SCM Râmnicu Vâlcea
24	CB	Elena Dache	24 March 1997 (aged 22)	1.80 m	0	0	(Romania) Dunărea Brăila
26	LB	Anca Polocoșer	1 May 1997 (aged 22)	1.80 m	11	2	(Romania) Minaur Baia Mare
27	P	Lorena Ostase	25 July 1997 (aged 22)	1.79 m	2	3	(Romania) CSM Slatina
30	RB	Sonia Seraficeanu	25 July 1997 (aged 22)	1.74 m	5	2	(Romania) Minaur Baia Mare
31	CB	Mădălina Zamfirescu	31 October 1994 (aged 25)	1.80 m	35	35	(Romania) SCM Râmnicu Vâlcea
77	LW	Ana Maria Popa	25 February 1990 (aged 29)	1.75 m	24	20	(Romania) Gloria Buzău
88	RB	Patricia Vizitiu	15 October 1988 (aged 31)	1.74 m	37	51	(Romania) SCM Craiova

=== Senegal ===
A 20-player squad was announced on 25 October 2019.

Head coach: (France) Frédéric Bougeant

No.	Pos.	Name	Date of birth (age)	Height	App.	Goals	Club
4	RW	Khady Seck	10 March 2000 (aged 19)				(Senegal) Diadji Sarr
5	CB	Amina Sankharé	4 May 1989 (aged 30)				(France) Fleury Loiret HB
7	RB	Doungou Camara	7 January 1995 (aged 24)				(France) Stella Sports Saint-Maur Handball
12	GK	Cira Aram Lo	22 November 1996 (aged 23)				(France) AS Cannes Mandelieu
14	RB	Fanta Keïta	17 October 1995 (aged 24)				(France) Aunis Handball
15	P	Hawa N'Diaye	24 July 1995 (aged 24)				(France) Toulon Saint-Cyr Var Handball
17	RW	Niacalin Kanté	30 November 1990 (aged 29)				(France) Sambre Avesnois Handball
19	LW	Adja Sanou Paye	26 September 1989 (aged 30)				(France) Le Pouzin Handball 07
21	GK	Hatadou Sako	21 October 1995 (aged 24)				(France) OGC Nice
22	LB	Marieme Ba	22 April 1998 (aged 21)				(France) US Alfortville
23	CB	Ndiole Sène	7 February 2003 (aged 16)				(Senegal) Espoir du Walo
24	LB	Penda Sylla	3 October 1990 (aged 29)				(France) ASPTT Strasbourg
27	LW	Dienaba Sy	27 June 1995 (aged 24)				(France) OGC Nice
44	RW	Raïssa Dapina	27 September 1995 (aged 24)				(France) Fleury Loiret HB
45	P	Laura Kamdop	14 September 1990 (aged 29)				(France) Fleury Loiret HB
67	LW	Awa Fall Diop	21 June 1991 (aged 28)				(France) ATH Achenheim

=== Spain ===
A 17-player squad was announced on 6 November 2019. On 19 November 2019, Maitane Etxeberria replaced Carmen Martín in the squad due to a foot injury.

Head coach: Carlos Viver

No.	Pos.	Name	Date of birth (age)	Height	App.	Goals	Club
2	RW	Marta López	4 February 1990 (aged 29)	1.68 m	103	206	(Romania) SCM Râmnicu Vâlcea
5	P	María Núñez	27 November 1988 (aged 31)	1.72 m	64	36	(France) ESBF Besançon
8	CB	Silvia Arderíus	11 July 1990 (aged 29)	1.68 m	33	38	(Spain) BM Bera Bera
10	P	Elisabet Cesáreo	25 May 1999 (aged 20)	1.77 m	15	2	(Spain) BM Bera Bera
12	GK	Silvia Navarro	20 March 1979 (aged 40)	1.67 m	198	7	(Spain) BM Remudas
16	GK	Merche Castellanos	20 March 1988 (aged 31)	1.86 m	43	1	(Spain) CBF Málaga Costa del Sol
17	LW	Jennifer Gutiérrez Bermejo	20 February 1995 (aged 24)	1.69 m	37	83	(Spain) Club Balonmano Elche
18	RW	Maitane Etxeberria	15 January 1997 (aged 22)	1.68 m	28	47	(Spain) BM Bera Bera
25	CB	Nerea Pena	13 December 1989 (aged 29)	1.75 m	149	491	(Hungary) Siófok KC
27	LB	Lara González Ortega	22 February 1992 (aged 27)	1.84 m	111	113	(France) ESBF Besançon
30	LW	Soledad López	4 April 1992 (aged 27)	1.62 m	19	68	(Spain) CBF Málaga Costa del Sol
34	CB	Alicia Fernández	21 December 1992 (aged 26)	1.72 m	29	65	(Romania) SCM Râmnicu Vâlcea
39	RB	Almudena Rodríguez	9 November 1993 (aged 26)	1.75 m	52	100	(Germany) Thüringer HC
44	P	Ainhoa Hernández	27 April 1994 (aged 25)	1.80 m	72	89	(Spain) Prosetecnisa Zuazo
48	GK	Darly de Paula	25 August 1982 (aged 37)	1.78 m	58	0	(Romania) Gloria Bistrița
86	LB	Alexandrina Cabral	5 May 1986 (aged 33)	1.75 m	110	513	(France) Nantes Atlantique Handball
99	RB	Mireya González	18 July 1991 (aged 28)	1.78 m	68	127	(Romania) SCM Râmnicu Vâlcea

== Group D ==
=== Argentina ===
An 18-player squad was announced on 4 November 2019.

Head coach: Eduardo Gallardo

No.	Pos.	Name	Date of birth (age)	Height	App.	Goals	Club
1	GK	Marisol Carratú	15 July 1986 (aged 33)	1.76 m	96	3	(Spain) CB Atlético Guardés
4	RW	Rosario Urban	13 March 1997 (aged 22)	1.67 m	43	85	(Spain) CB Atlético Guardés
5	LB	Manuela Pizzo	13 November 1991 (aged 28)	1.78 m	136	337	(Spain) BM Bera Bera
6	RW	Ayelén García	13 December 1999 (aged 19)	1.66 m	7	11	(Argentina) River Plate
7	P	Rocío Campigli	6 August 1994 (aged 25)	1.70 m	60	140	(Spain) CBF Málaga
8	LW	Camila Bonazzola	21 June 1996 (aged 23)	1.71 m	47	105	(Argentina) Vi.Lo
9	RB	Luciana Mendoza	14 March 1990 (aged 29)	1.70 m	159	534	(France) Achenheim Truchtersheim Handball
10	CB	Victoria Crivelli	30 September 1990 (aged 29)	1.74 m	152	186	(Argentina) Ferro Carril Oeste
13	P	Giuliana Gavilan	7 March 1996 (aged 23)	1.76 m	30	38	(Spain) BMC Gijón
15	P	Antonela Mena	28 March 1988 (aged 31)	1.83 m	175	211	(Argentina) CID Moreno
16	GK	Leila Niño	23 October 1992 (aged 27)	1.67 m	22	2	(Argentina) CI.DE.CO
17	RB	Malena Cavo	2 April 1999 (aged 20)	1.69 m	12	32	(Argentina) Dorrego Handball
18	CB	Macarena Sans	20 November 1996 (aged 23)	1.65 m	70	105	(Argentina) Regatas Handball
20	LW	Joana Bolling	6 April 1995 (aged 24)	1.69 m	20	30	(Spain) BM Aula Cultural
21	LB	Macarena Gandulfo	3 November 1993 (aged 26)	1.75 m	70	84	(Romania) CS Cluj-Napoca
22	LB	Elke Karsten	15 May 1995 (aged 24)	1.77 m	81	189	(Hungary) Debreceni VSC
25	LB	Micaela Casasola	17 March 1997 (aged 22)	1.75 m	46	87	(Argentina) Vélez Sarsfield

=== China ===
Head coach: (Denmark) Heine Jensen

No.	Pos.	Name	Date of birth (age)	Height	App.	Goals	Club
1	GK	Lu Chang	6 April 1998 (aged 21)	1.80 m	0	0	(China) Shandong Handball
2	RB	Lin Yanqun	16 May 1996 (aged 23)	1.77 m	70	140	(China) Shandong Handball
3	RW	Zhang Haixia	10 February 1995 (aged 24)	1.74 m	90	180	(China) Jiangsu Handball
9	CB	Zhou Yuting	26 October 1995 (aged 24)	1.78 m	40	90	(China) Shandong Handball
10	LB	Tian Xiuxiu	13 January 1996 (aged 23)	1.70 m	45	70	(China) Shandong Handball
11	LW	Lyu Qingwen	22 May 1998 (aged 21)	1.68 m	40	90	(China) Shandong Handball
12	GK	Hu Xiaoying	18 April 1998 (aged 21)	1.78 m	0	0	(China) Shanghai Handball
14	LB	Zhou Mengxue	20 February 2000 (aged 19)	1.75 m	30	90	(China) Anhui Handball
15	RB	Sun Mengying	11 April 1990 (aged 29)	1.77 m	90	120	(China) Shanghai Handball
18	LB	Chen Shuo	18 November 2000 (aged 19)	1.80 m	0	0	(China) Guangdong Handball
19	P	Mo Mengmeng	6 January 1995 (aged 24)	1.80 m	35	15	(China) Jiangsu Handball
21	P	Mu Qingcong	26 May 1997 (aged 22)	1.80 m	0	0	(China) Shandong Handball
22	GK	Yang Yurou	16 July 1996 (aged 23)	1.85 m	70	5	(Norway) Vipers Kristiansand
28	P	Qiao Ru	5 January 1995 (aged 24)	1.83 m	90	160	(China) Jiangsu Handball
30	RW	Zhou Lei	25 October 1994 (aged 25)	1.70 m	15	30	(China) Shanghai Handball
32	LW	Yu Yuanyuan	30 January 1995 (aged 24)	1.72 m	50	100	(China) Jiangsu Handball
34	CB	Jin Mengqing	29 May 1995 (aged 24)	1.72 m	60	150	(China) Jiangsu Handball
99	RW	Huang Haiyu	9 February 2000 (aged 19)	1.68 m	0	0	(China) Guangxi Handball

=== DR Congo ===
Head coach: Célestin Mpoua

No.	Pos.	Name	Date of birth (age)	Height	App.	Goals	Club
4	CB	Consolate Feza	23 March 1985 (aged 34)				(Democratic Republic of the Congo) Mikishi Lubumbashi
5	LB	Laety Ombala	17 January 1999 (aged 20)				(France) Aulnay Handball
6	LW	Clémence Matutu	28 April 1992 (aged 27)				(France) Serris Val d'Europe
9	LB	Christianne Mwasesa	23 March 1985 (aged 34)				(Angola) Primeiro de Agosto
10	CB	Raissa Yalibi	11 March 1992 (aged 27)				(Democratic Republic of the Congo) HC Heritage
11	LB	Hillary Ikdondo	31 March 1997 (aged 22)				(Spain) Real Madrid
12	GK	Françoise Tshibola	28 December 1994 (aged 24)				(Democratic Republic of the Congo) HC Heritage
13	LB	Lydia Musonda	6 May 1988 (aged 31)				(Democratic Republic of the Congo) Mikishi Lubumbashi
17	RB	Cynthia Liandja	7 October 1995 (aged 24)				(France) Handball Plan-de-Cuques
18	RW	Vanessa Moesta	16 December 1992 (aged 26)				(France) Angoulême Charente Handball
25	RB	Carine Babina	16 January 1994 (aged 25)				(Democratic Republic of the Congo) Mikishi Lubumbashi
33	LW	Estel Memana	5 August 1997 (aged 22)				(France) Chambray Touraine Handball
39	CB	Prescyllia Engala	30 December 1991 (aged 27)				(France) Aulnay Handball
42	P	Isaure Mosabau	10 June 1994 (aged 25)				(France) Noisy-le-Grand Handball
72	GK	Cecilia Errin	13 December 1998 (aged 20)				(France) Handball Octeville-sur-Mer
77	P	Roseline Ngo	27 April 1993 (aged 26)				(France) Le Pouzin Handball
94	GK	Nganmogne Audrey	14 November 1994 (aged 25)				(France) Mérignac Handball

=== Japan ===
A 21-player squad was announced on 12 November 2019.

Head coach: (Denmark) Ulrik Kirkely

No.	Pos.	Name	Date of birth (age)	Height	App.	Goals	Club
1	GK	Kimiko Hida	26 September 1977 (aged 42)	1.70 m	117	0	(Japan) Sony Semiconductor
2	P	Mika Nagata	28 May 1994 (aged 25)	1.80 m	27	15	(Japan) Hokkoku Bank
3	P	Kaho Sunami	5 January 1993 (aged 26)	1.66 m	31	65	(Japan) Sony Semiconductor
4	RB	Yui Sunami	7 June 1991 (aged 28)	1.62 m	49	134	(Japan) Hokkoku Bank
5	LB	Sayo Shiota	21 March 1989 (aged 30)	1.72 m	55	62	(Japan) Hokkoku Bank
7	RW	Asuka Fujita	14 February 1996 (aged 23)	1.66 m	30	78	(Germany) Borussia Dortmund
11	P	Mana Horikawa	4 March 1994 (aged 25)	1.74 m	6	1	(Japan) lzumi Maple Reds
13	LW	Chie Katsuren	14 April 1989 (aged 30)	1.59 m	51	126	(Japan) Omron
15	RB	Hitomi Tada	13 October 1991 (aged 28)	1.66 m	23	37	(Japan) MIE violet' IRIS
16	GK	Yumi Miyagawa	2 November 1991 (aged 28)	1.72 m	3	0	(Japan) Omron
18	LW	Yuki Tanabe	25 August 1989 (aged 30)	1.70 m	59	157	(Japan) Hokkoku Bank
20	RW	Natsumi Akiyama	23 July 1994 (aged 25)	1.62 m	19	60	(Japan) Hokkoku Bank
21	RW	Ayaka Ikehara	24 September 1990 (aged 29)	1.57 m	36	93	(Denmark) Nykøbing Falster Håndboldklub
25	CB	Mana Ohyama	7 December 1992 (aged 26)	1.65 m	31	66	(Japan) Hokkoku Bank
27	LB	Haruno Sasaki	26 February 1995 (aged 24)	1.72 m	14	37	(Japan) Hokkoku Bank
28	P	Shiori Nagata	24 October 1987 (aged 32)	1.72 m	95	79	(Japan) Omron
30	GK	Sakura Hauge	7 January 1987 (aged 32)	1.73 m	37	2	(France) ESBF Besançon
41	LB	Tomomi Kawata	30 June 1998 (aged 21)	1.61 m	19	81	(Japan) Hokkoku Bank
81	CB	Mayuko Ishitate	18 January 1987 (aged 32)	1.67 m	86	183	(Japan) MIE violet' IRIS

=== Russia ===
A 20-player squad was announced on 8 November 2019. On 20 November the squad was reduced to 18 players.

Head coach: (Spain) Ambros Martin

No.	Pos.	Name	Date of birth (age)	Height	App.	Goals	Club
1	GK	Anna Sedoykina	1 August 1984 (aged 35)	1.85 m	145	5	(Russia) Rostov-Don
2	LW	Polina Kuznetsova	10 June 1987 (aged 32)	1.68 m	147	397	(Russia) Rostov-Don
8	LB	Anna Sen	3 December 1990 (aged 28)	1.86 m	140	329	(Russia) Rostov-Don
9	LB	Olga Gorshenina	9 November 1990 (aged 29)	1.83 m	45	24	(Russia) CSKA Moscow
11	GK	Anastasia Lagina	11 August 1995 (aged 24)	1.80 m	2	0	(Russia) HC Lada
13	RB	Anna Vyakhireva	13 March 1995 (aged 24)	1.68 m	81	360	(Russia) Rostov-Don
17	LB	Vladlena Bobrovnikova	24 October 1987 (aged 32)	1.80 m	58	149	(Russia) Rostov-Don
19	P	Kseniya Makeyeva	19 September 1990 (aged 29)	1.85 m	139	274	(Russia) Rostov-Don
23	LB	Elena Mikhaylichenko	14 September 2001 (aged 18)	1.79 m	4	5	(Russia) HC Lada
25	RW	Olga Fomina	17 April 1989 (aged 30)	1.75 m	115	234	(Russia) HC Lada
27	P	Yana Zhilinskayte	6 March 1989 (aged 30)	1.85 m	38	32	(Russia) CSKA Moscow
34	LB	Elizaveta Malashenko	26 February 1996 (aged 23)	1.79 m	47	58	(Russia) HC Astrakhanochka
36	RW	Yulia Managarova	27 September 1988 (aged 31)	1.67 m	34	104	(Russia) Rostov-Don
63	LW	Kristina Kozhokar	28 February 1994 (aged 25)	1.74 m	22	32	(Russia) Rostov-Don
67	P	Anastasia Illarionova	28 March 1999 (aged 20)	1.80 m	3	3	(Russia) Zvezda Zvenigorod
77	CB	Yaroslava Frolova	18 May 1997 (aged 22)	1.77 m	28	32	(Russia) HC Kuban Krasnodar
88	GK	Victoriya Kalinina	8 December 1988 (aged 30)	1.83 m	84	0	(Russia) HC Kuban Krasnodar

=== Sweden ===
An 18-player squad was announced on 22 October 2019. On 5 November 2019, Kristin Thorleifsdóttir replaced Sabina Jacobsen in the squad due to a knee injury. On 30 November, Jessica Ryde and Kristin Thorleifsdóttir were cut from the squad.

Head coach: Henrik Signell

No.	Pos.	Name	Date of birth (age)	Height	App.	Goals	Club
1	GK	Martina Thörn	21 February 1991 (aged 28)	1.78 m	15	0	(Denmark) Aarhus United
4	LW	Olivia Mellegård	17 June 1996 (aged 23)	1.77 m	50	107	(Denmark) København Håndbold
6	CB	Carin Strömberg	10 July 1993 (aged 26)	1.84 m	75	83	(Denmark) Viborg HK
7	P	Linn Blohm	20 May 1992 (aged 27)	1.80 m	94	221	(Denmark) København Håndbold
8	LB	Jamina Roberts	28 May 1990 (aged 29)	1.76 m	155	323	(Denmark) Randers HK
9	CB	Melissa Petrén	18 January 1995 (aged 24)	1.73 m	7	21	(Denmark) HH Elite
10	RW	Mathilda Lundström	20 December 1996 (aged 22)	1.64 m	25	29	(Sweden) Skuru IK
11	P	Johanna Forsberg	16 October 1995 (aged 24)	1.77 m	8	12	(Sweden) IK Sävehof
12	GK	Filippa Idéhn	15 August 1990 (aged 29)	1.83 m	113	3	(Denmark) Silkeborg-Voel KFUM
18	LW	Marie Wall	3 April 1992 (aged 27)	1.77 m	27	33	(Denmark) København Håndbold
19	P	Anna Lagerquist	16 October 1993 (aged 26)	1.75 m	47	71	(Denmark) Nykøbing Falster
20	CB	Isabelle Gulldén	19 July 1989 (aged 30)	1.78 m	203	790	(France) Brest Bretagne Handball
22	RB	Hanna Blomstrand	25 August 1996 (aged 23)	1.73 m	49	86	(Denmark) København Håndbold
23	RB	Emma Lindqvist	17 September 1997 (aged 22)	1.77 m	10	7	(Sweden) H 65 Höör
24	RW	Nathalie Hagman	19 July 1991 (aged 28)	1.67 m	143	452	(Denmark) Odense Håndbold
25	LB	Mikaela Mässing	13 March 1994 (aged 25)	1.88 m	20	72	(Germany) Thüringer HC

== Statistics ==
=== Player representation by league system ===
In all, World Championship squad members play for clubs in 31 different countries.

League	Teams																								Total
League	(Angola)	(Argentina)	(Australia)	(Brazil)	(China)	(Cuba)	(Democratic Republic of the Congo)	(Denmark)	(France)	(Germany)	(Hungary)	(Japan)	(Kazakhstan)	(Montenegro)	(Netherlands)	(Norway)	(Romania)	(Russia)	(Senegal)	(Serbia)	(Slovenia)	(South Korea)	(Spain)	(Sweden)	Total
France	-	1	1	3	-	1	10	3	15	1	-	1	-	-	1	-	-	-	14	4	2	1	3	1	59
Hungary	-	1	-	3	-	-	-	2	4	-	18	-	-	2	1	3	-	-	-	5	-	-	1	-	40
Denmark	-	-	-	-	-	-	-	12	-	-	-	1	-	-	5	7	-	-	-	-	-	-	-	11	36
Romania	-	1	-	5	-	-	-	-	-	-	-	-	-	5	-	-	17	-	-	4	-	-	4	-	36
Germany	-	-	2	-	-	-	-	-	-	14	-	1	-	-	8	-	-	-	-	1	1	-	1	1	29
Russia	-	-	-	1	-	-	-	-	-	1	-	-	-	-	1	-	-	17	-	-	-	-	-	-	20
China	-	-	-	-	17	-	-	-	-	-	-	-	-	-	-	-	-	-	-	-	-	-	-	-	17
Spain	-	6	-	3	-	4	1	-	-	-	-	-	-	-	-	-	-	-	-	-	-	-	7	-	17
Angola	16	-	-	-	-	-	1	-	-	-	-	-	-	-	-	-	-	-	-	-	-	-	-	-	17
Japan	-	-	-	-	-	-	-	-	-	-	-	16	-	-	-	-	-	-	-	-	-	-	-	-	16
Kazakhstan	-	-	-	-	-	-	-	-	-	-	-	-	16	-	-	-	-	-	-	-	-	-	-	-	16
South Korea	-	-	-	-	-	-	-	-	-	-	-	-	-	-	-	-	-	-	-	-	-	15	-	-	15
Australia	-	-	12	-	-	-	-	-	-	-	-	-	-	-	-	-	-	-	-	-	-	-	-	-	12
Slovenia	-	-	-	-	-	-	-	-	-	-	-	-	-	-	-	-	-	-	-	1	11	-	-	-	12
Cuba	-	-	-	-	-	10	-	-	-	-	-	-	-	-	-	-	-	-	-	-	-	-	-	-	10
Montenegro	-	-	-	-	-	-	-	-	-	-	-	-	-	9	-	-	-	-	-	-	-	-	-	-	9
Norway	-	-	-	-	1	-	-	-	-	-	-	-	-	-	1	7	-	-	-	-	-	-	-	-	9
Argentina	-	8	-	-	-	-	-	-	-	-	-	-	-	-	-	-	-	-	-	-	-	-	-	-	8
DR Congo	-	-	-	-	-	-	5	-	-	-	-	-	-	-	-	-	-	-	-	-	-	-	-	-	5
Croatia	-	-	-	-	-	-	-	-	-	-	-	-	-	1	-	-	-	-	-	1	1	-	-	-	3
Sweden	-	-	-	-	-	-	-	-	-	-	-	-	-	-	-	-	-	-	-	-	-	-	-	3	3
Brazil	-	-	-	2	-	-	-	-	-	-	-	-	-	-	-	-	-	-	-	-	-	-	-	-	2
Senegal	-	-	-	-	-	-	-	-	-	-	-	-	-	-	-	-	-	-	2	-	-	-	-	-	2
Greece	-	-	-	-	-	-	-	-	-	-	-	-	-	-	-	-	-	-	-	-	1	-	-	-	1
Poland	-	-	-	1	-	-	-	-	-	-	-	-	-	-	-	-	-	-	-	-	-	-	-	-	1
Italy	-	-	-	-	-	1	-	-	-	-	-	-	-	-	-	-	-	-	-	-	-	-	-	-	1
Turkey	-	-	-	-	-	-	-	-	-	-	-	-	-	-	-	-	-	-	-	-	1	-	-	-	1
Hong Kong	-	-	1	-	-	-	-	-	-	-	-	-	-	-	-	-	-	-	-	-	-	-	-	-	1

=== Coaches representation by country ===
Coaches in bold represent their own country.

Nº	Country	Coaches
5	Denmark	Morten Soubak (Angola), Ulrik Kirkely (Japan), Heine Jensen (China), Kim Rasmussen (Hungary), **Klavs Bruun Jørgensen**
3	Sweden	Tomas Ryde (Romania), Per Johansson (Montenegro), **Henrik Signell**
3	Spain	Jorge Dueñas (Brazil), Ambros Martín (Russia) **Carlos Viver**
3	France	Emmanuel Mayonnade (Netherlands), Frédéric Bougeant (Senegal), **Olivier Krumbholz**
1	Argentina	**Eduardo Gallardo**
1	Iceland	Thorir Hergeirsson (Norway)
1	Netherlands	Henk Groener (Germany)
1	South Korea	**Kang Jae-won**
1	Serbia	**Ljubomir Obradović**
1	Slovenia	**Uroš Bregar**
1	Egypt	Heba Aly (Australia)
1	(Republic of the Congo) Congo	Celestin Mpoua (DR Congo)
1	Cuba	**Jorge Coll**
1	Kazakhstan	**Berik Beknazarov**
