= Handball at the 2019 Pan American Games – Women's team rosters =

== Group A ==
=== Brazil ===
The squad chosen for the 2019 Pan American Games in Lima, Peru.

Head coach: Jorge Dueñas

No.	Pos.	Name	Date of birth (age)	Height	App.	Goals	Club
	GK	Bárbara Arenhart					(Hungary) Váci KSE
	GK	Renata Arruda					(Spain) BM Bera Bera
	RW	Adriana de Castro					(Spain) BM Bera Bera
	RW	Mariana Costa					(Romania) Gloria Bistrita
	RB	Deonise Fachinello					(France) Bourg-de-Péage Drôme Handball
	CB	Ana Paula Belo					(Russia) Rostov-Don
	CB	Bruna de Paula					(France) Fleury Loiret HB
	CB	Patricia Matieli					(Poland) MKS Zagłębie Lubin
	LB	Eduarda Amorim					(Hungary) Györy ETO
	LB	Jaqueline Anastácio					(Romania) CS Măgura Cisnădie
	LB	Samara Vieira					(Romania) SCM Râmnicu Vâlcea
	LW	Larissa Araújo					(Romania) Universitatea Cluj-Napoca
	P	Elaine Gomes					(France) Nantes Loire Atlantique Handball
	P	Tamires de Araújo					(Romania) HC Dunărea Brăila

=== Canada ===
The squad chosen for the 2019 Pan American Games in Lima, Peru.

Head coach: Nathalie Brochu

No.	Pos.	Name	Date of birth (age)	Height	App.	Goals	Club
1	GK	Camilia Pivin	9 September 2001 (age 23)				(Canada) Drummondville
2	RW	Nassima Benhacine	12 December 1989 (age 35)				(Canada) Granby
3	B	Emily Routhier	29 March 1994 (age 31)				(Canada) Sherbrooke
5	LW	Myriam Laplante	21 February 1991 (age 34)				(Canada) Champlain
9	B	Katya Chan	11 December 1995 (age 29)				(Canada) Edmonton Handball Club
10	B	Myriam Zimmer	1 April 1993 (age 32)				(France) Grand Poitiers
12	GK	Vassilia Gagnon	5 September 1990 (age 35)				(Canada) Champlain
14	LW	Haven Wong	28 January 1997 (age 28)				(Canada) Edmonton Handball Club
15	B	Audrey Marcoux	8 June 1994 (age 31)				(Canada) Sherbrooke
18	B	Catherine Leger	14 December 1995 (age 29)				(France) Grand Poitiers
19	B	Samantha Koosau	27 April 1991 (age 34)				(Canada) Champlain
21	B	Rosali Langlois	21 March 1992 (age 33)				(Canada) Champlain
25	P	Alexandra Pivin	14 July 1998 (age 27)				(France) CSV Haute-Saône
69	B	Yuki Landry	7 September 1998 (age 26)				(Canada) Champlain

=== Cuba ===
The squad chosen for the 2019 Pan American Games in Lima, Peru.

Head coach: Jorge Coll

No.	Pos.	Name	Date of birth (age)	Height	App.	Goals	Club
1	GK	Niurkis Mora					Santiago de Cuba
4	RB	Liliamnis Rosabal					(Cuba) Granma
5	RB	Schakira Robert					(Cuba) La Habana
8	P	Arisleidy Márquez					(Cuba) Pinar del Rio
9	LB	Lizandra Lusson					(Spain) BM Remudas
10	RW	Gleinys Reyes					(Spain) BM Remudas
11	P	Yunisleidy Camejo					(Spain) BM Bera Bera
12	GK	Indiana Cedeño					Santiago de Cuba
18	RB	Lorena Téllez					(Spain) BM La Calzada
23	CB	Eyatne Rizo					(France) Fleury Loiret HB
24	LB	Nahomi Márquez					(Cuba) La Habana
34	RB	Yennifer Toledo					(Cuba) Villa Clara
55	CB	Yurumy Céspedes					(Cuba) Matanzas
77	CB	Rosa Leal

=== Puerto Rico ===
The squad chosen for the 2019 Pan American Games in Lima, Peru.

Head coach: Dennis Santiago

No.	Pos.	Name	Date of birth (age)	Height	App.	Goals	Club
1		Kitsa Escobar
2		Adriana Cabrera
5		Nathalys Ceballos
6		Sheila Hiraldo
7		Erika Graciani
8		Joane Vergara
11		Alanis Benitez
12		Roxanaly Carrasquillo
13		Alexandra Rodriguez
14		Nicolette Pope
15		Jailene Maldonado
18		Ciris García
22		Zuleika Fuentes
24		Robeliz Ortiz

== Group B ==
=== Argentina ===
The squad chosen for the 2019 Pan American Games in Lima, Peru.

Head coach: Eduardo Gallardo

No.	Pos.	Name	Date of birth (age)	Height	App.	Goals	Club
	GK	Marisol Carratú					(Spain) Atlético Guardés
	GK	Nadia Bordon					(Argentina) Lanús
	CB	Elke Karsten					(Hungary) Debreceni
	CB	Victoria Crivelli					(Argentina) Ferro Carril Oeste
	CB	Micaela Casasola					(Argentina) Vélez Sarsfield
	LB	Manuela Pizzo					(Spain) BM Bera Bera
	RB	Luciana Mendoza					(France) Achenheim Truchtersheim
	LB	Macarena Gandulfo					(Argentina) Mendoza de Regatas
	RB	Macarena Sans					(Argentina) Mendoza de Regatas
	RW	Malena Cavo					(Argentina) Dorrego Handball
	RW	Camila Bonazzola					(Spain) Atlético Guardés
	RW	Rosario Urban					(Spain) Atlético Guardés
	P	Rocío Campigli					(Spain) BM Málaga Costa del Sol
	P	Antonela Mena					(Argentina) CID Moreno

=== Dominican Republic ===
The squad chosen for the 2019 Pan American Games in Lima, Peru.

Head coach: Felix Romero

No.	Pos.	Name	Date of birth (age)	Height	App.	Goals	Club
1		Cari Domínguez
2		Yojaver Brito
3		Crisleydi Hernández
5		Danilza Liranzo
6		Annerys Cabrera
7		Johanna Pimentel
8		Nancy Peña
9		Mariela Andino
10		Carina Lorenzo
11		Florquidia Puello
12		Suleidy Suárez
14		Débora Torreira
17		Yamilet Morfe
19		Yeimy Novas

=== Peru ===
The squad chosen for the 2019 Pan American Games in Lima, Peru.

Head coach: Mario Ramos

No.	Pos.	Name	Date of birth (age)	Height	App.	Goals	Club
		Tiffany Angulo
		Derly Gálvez
		Karoline Salcedo
		Marcela Balarín
		Andrea Lizana
		Kelly Servat
		Ariana Cruz
		Maria Miranda
		Angie Vazquez
		Camila Delgado
		Rosa Porras
		Lucía Vilchez
		Mariana Díaz
		Sara Romero

=== United States ===
The squad chosen for the 2019 Pan American Games in Lima, Peru.

Head coach: Christian Latulippe

No.	Pos.	Name	Date of birth (age)	Height	App.	Goals	Club
	LB	Nicole Andersen					(Denmark) Hellerup IK
	RW	Ashley Butler					(Germany) HSG Hude
	RB	Kathy Darling					(South Korea) Busan Bisco
	GK	Sophie Fasold					(Germany) TSV Nord Harrislee
	P	Jennifer Fithian					(United States) Team Rogue
	P	Sarah Gascon					(United States) Team Rogue
	RW	Elizabeth Hartnett					(United States) Team Rogue
	RW	Zoe Lombard					(United States) Team Rogue
	P	Shani Levinkind					(Israel) Maccabi Arazim Ramat Gan
	GK	Bryana Newbern					(Germany) TSV Oyten
	CB	Jence Rhoads					(Spain) Atlético Guardés
	CB	Julia Sayer					(Germany) TSV Hahlen
	LW	Julia Taylor					(France) Aulnay Handball
	LW	Maria Vallone					(Argentina) Vilo
