= Handball at the 2019 Pan American Games =

- Handball pictogram
- Venue: Sports Centre Hall 1
- Dates: July 24 – August 5, 2019
- Competitors: 224 from 10 nations

Handball competitions at the 2019 Pan American Games in Lima, Peru, were held from July 24 (two days before the opening ceremony) to August 5. The venue for the competition is the Sports Centre Hall 1 located at the Videna cluster. The venue also hosted judo. A total of eight men's and eight women's teams (each consisting of up to 14 athletes) competed in each tournament. This means a total of 224 athletes are competed.

The winner of each competition qualified for the 2020 Summer Olympics in Tokyo, Japan.

== Competition schedule ==
The following is the competition schedule for the handball competitions:

P	Preliminaries	½	Semifinals	B	Bronze medal game	F	Final

Event ↓ / Date →	Wed 24	Thu 25	Fri 26	Sat 27	Sun 28	Mon 29	Tue 30		Wed 31	Thu 1	Fri 2	Sat 3	Sun 4	Mon 5	
Men									P	P	P		½	B	F
Women	P	P		P		½	B	F							

== Medal table ==
Rank	Nation	Gold	Silver	Bronze	Total
1	Argentina	1	1	0	2
2	Brazil	1	0	1	2
3	Chile	0	1	0	1
4	Cuba	0	0	1	1
Totals (4 entries)		2	2	2	6

== Medalists ==
Event	Gold	Silver	Bronze
Men's tournament	Argentina; Matías Schulz; Federico Fernández; Federico Pizarro; Sebastián Simonet; Pablo Vainstein; Diego Simonet; Ignacio Pizarro; Pablo Simonet; Santiago Baronetto; Lucas Moscariello; Gonzalo Carou; Guillermo Fischer; Leonel Maciel; Nicolás Bonanno	Chile; Felipe Barrientos; Sebastián Ceballos; Erwin Feuchtmann; Elías Oyarzún; Diego Reyes; Javier Frelijj; Emil Feuchtmann; Esteban Salinas; Felipe García; Rodrigo Salinas; Sebastián Pavez; Marco Oneto; Daniel Ayala; Víctor Donoso	Brazil; Henrique Teixeira; João Pedro Silva; Rogério Moraes; Thiagus dos Santos; Alexandro Pozzer; Felipe Borges; Fábio Chiuffa; Oswaldo Guimarães; Thiago Ponciano; Haniel Langaro; Raul Nantes; Leonardo Terçariol; Rudolph Hackbarth; César Almeida
Women's tournament	Brazil; Bruna de Paula; Tamires Morena Lima; Ana Paula Belo; Bárbara Arenhart; Eduarda Amorim; Elaine Gomes; Larissa Araújo; Adriana Castro; Samara da Silva; Jaqueline Anastácio; Patrícia Matieli; Deonise Fachinello; Renata Arruda; Mariana Costa	Argentina; Marisol Carratú; Rosario Urban; Malena Cavo; Manuela Pizzo; Rocío Campigli; Camila Bonazzola; Luciana Mendoza; Victoria Crivelli; Antonela Mena; Nadia Bordon; Macarena Sans; Macarena Gandulfo; Elke Karsten; Micaela Casasola	Cuba; Niurkis Mora; Liliamnis Rosabal; Schakira Robert; Arisleidy Márquez; Lizandra Lusson; Gleinys Reyes; Yunisleidy Camejo; Indiana Cedeño; Lorena Téllez; Eyatne Rizo; Nahomi Márquez; Yennifer Toledo; Yarumy Céspedes; Rosa Leal

== Participating nations ==
A total of 10 countries have qualified athletes. The number of athletes a nation has entered is in parentheses beside the name of the country.

- Argentina (28)
- Brazil (28)
- Canada (14)
- Chile (14)
- Cuba (28)
- Dominican Republic (14)
- Mexico (14)
- Peru (28)
- Puerto Rico (28)
- United States (28)

== Qualification ==
A total of eight men's teams and eight women's teams qualified to compete at the games in each tournament. The host nation (Peru) qualified in each tournament, along with seven other teams in various qualifying tournaments.

=== Men ===
Event	Dates	Location	Vacancies	Qualified
Host Nation	—N/a	—N/a	1	Peru
2018 South American Games	2–6 June	(Bolivia) Cochabamba	2	Brazil; Argentina
2018 Central American and Caribbean Games	27 July – 1 August	(Colombia) Barranquilla	3	Cuba; Puerto Rico; Mexico
North Zone Qualifying (Canada vs. United States)	2–5 September	(United States) Auburn (Canada) Montreal	1	United States
Last chance qualification tournament	12–13 April	(Chile) Santiago	1	Chile
Total			8	

- Chile (3rd-placed finisher at the South American Games) and Colombia (5th at the Central American and Caribbean Games) competed in the last chance tournament.

=== Women ===
Event	Dates	Location	Vacancies	Qualified
Host Nation	—N/a	—N/a	1	Peru
2018 South American Games	27–31 May	(Bolivia) Cochabamba	2	Brazil; Argentina
2018 Central American and Caribbean Games	20–25 July	(Colombia) Barranquilla	3	Dominican Republic; Puerto Rico; Cuba
North Zone Qualifying (Canada vs. United States)	2–5 September	(United States) Auburn (Canada) Montreal	1	United States
Last chance qualification tournament	26–28 March	Mexico City	1	Canada
Total			8	

- Chile (3rd-placed finisher at the South American Games), Mexico and Guatemala (4th and 5th at the Central American and Caribbean Games) and Canada (loser of the North Zone Qualifying) competed in the last chance tournament.

== See also ==
- Handball at the 2020 Summer Olympics
