= Kim Su-yeon (disambiguation) =

Kim Su-yeon or Kim Su-yŏn may refer to:

- Kim Soo-yun (born 1989), South Korean female footballer
- Kim Su-yeon (born 2001), South Korean figure skater
- Kim Su-yeon (handballer) (born 1998), South Korean handballer
