= Hillary Ikdondo =

Congolese handball player

Personal information
- Nationality: Congolese
- Born: 31 March 1997 (age 29)
- Height: 1.70 m (5 ft 7 in)

Sport
- Sport: Handball
- Position: Left back
- Current club: Real Madrid
National team
- Years: Team
- –: DR Congo

Hillary Ikdondo (born 31 March 1997) is a Congolese handball player for Real Madrid and the DR Congo national team.

She represented DR Congo at the 2019 World Women's Handball Championship.
