= Frédéric Bougeant =

French handball coach (born 1975)

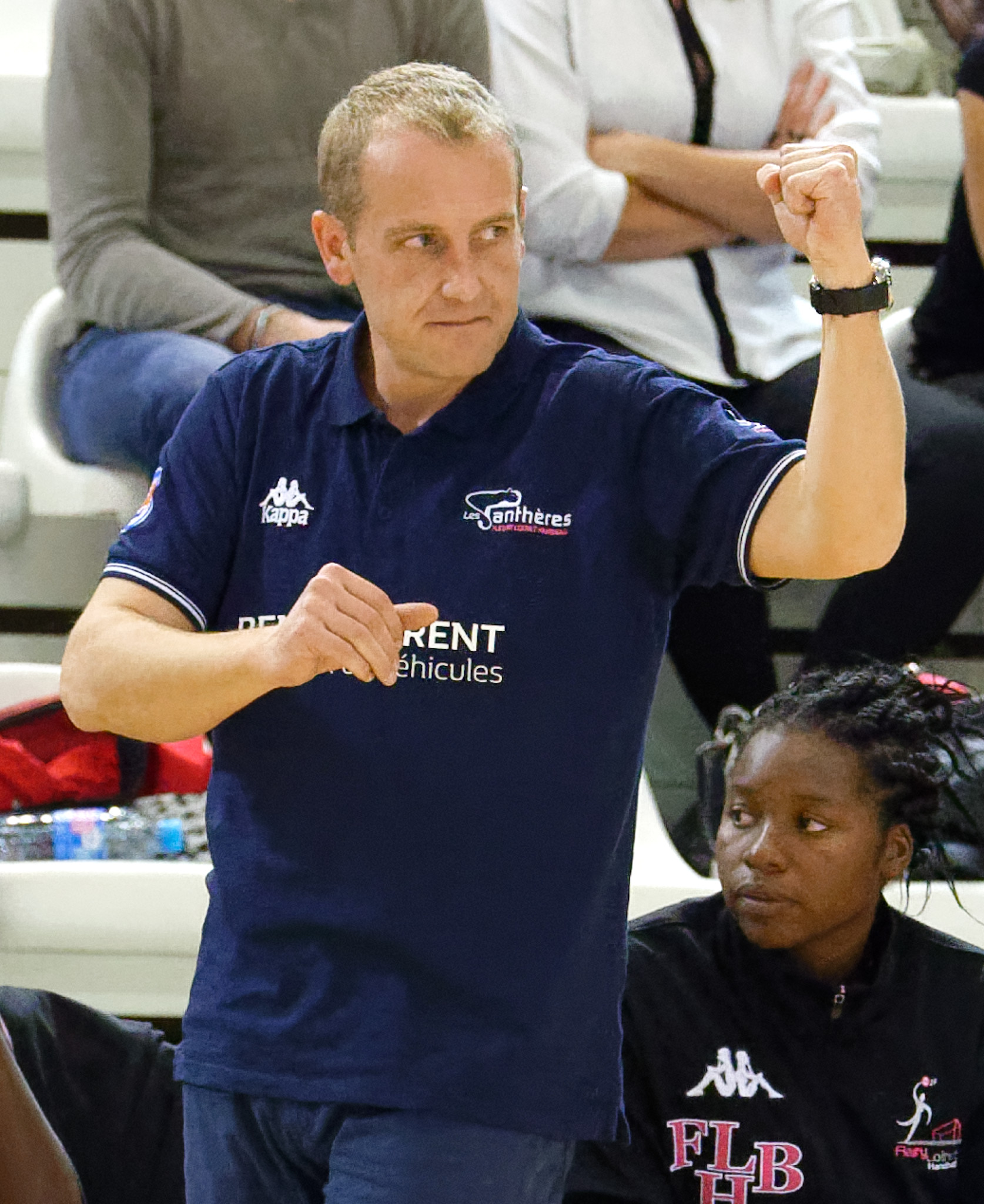
- Bougeant in 2015

Personal information
- Nationality: French
- Born: 6 December 1975 (age 50) Le Havre, France

Sport
- Sport: Handball
- Current club: AEK H.C.

Teams managed
- Years: Team
- 1999–2012: Le Havre AC
- 2012–2016: Fleury Loiret HB
- 2016–2019: Senegal
- 2016–2018: Rostov-Don
- 2018: Nantes Loire Atlantique Handball
- 2020–2023: JS Cherbourg
- 2021–: Senegal
- 2023–: AEK H.C.
Medal record
African Championship
| Silver medal – second place | 2018 Brazzaville |

Frédéric Bougeant (born 6 December 1975) is a French handball coach. He is currently the coach of the Senegalese national team and AEK H.C. He coached Senegal at the 2019 World Women's Handball Championship in Japan, where they finished 18th.

At the 2018 African Women's Handball Championship he won silver medals, losing to Angola in the final.

== Titles ==
=== National team ===
- African Women's Handball Championship:
  - Silver medal: 2018

=== Club ===
==== International ====
- EHF Cup:
  - Winner: 2017 (with Rostov-Don)
- EHF Challenge Cup:
  - Winner: 2012 (with Le Havre AC)
- EHF Cup Winners' Cup:
  - Finalist: 2015 (with CJF Fleury)

==== Domestic ====
- Russian Championship:
  - Winner: 2017, 2018 (with Rostov-Don)
- Russian Cup:
  - Winner: 2017, 2018 (with Rostov-Don)
- French Championship:
  - Winner: 2015 (with CJF Fleury)
  - Second place: 2006, 2007, 2008, 2009, 2010 (with Le Havre AC), 2013, 2016 (with CJF Fleury)
- French Cup:
  - Winner: 2006, 2007 (with Le Havre AC), 2014 (with CJF Fleury)
- French League Cup:
  - Winner: 2015, 2016 (with Le Havre AC)
- French Second Division:
  - Winner: 2002 (with Le Havre AC)
