= Iulia Poilova =

Kazakhstani handball player

Personal information
- Nationality: Kazakhstani
- Born: 9 November 1988 (age 37)
- Height: 1.85 m (6 ft 1 in)

Sport
- Sport: Handball
- Position: Goalkeeper
- Current club: Kuban Krasnodar
National team
Years	Team	Apps	(Gls)
–	Kazakhstan	12	(0)

Iulia Poilova (born 9 November 1988) is a Kazakhstani handball player for Kuban Krasnodar and the Kazakhstani national team.

She represented Kazakhstan at the 2019 World Women's Handball Championship.
