= Heine Jensen =

Danish handball coach (born 1977)

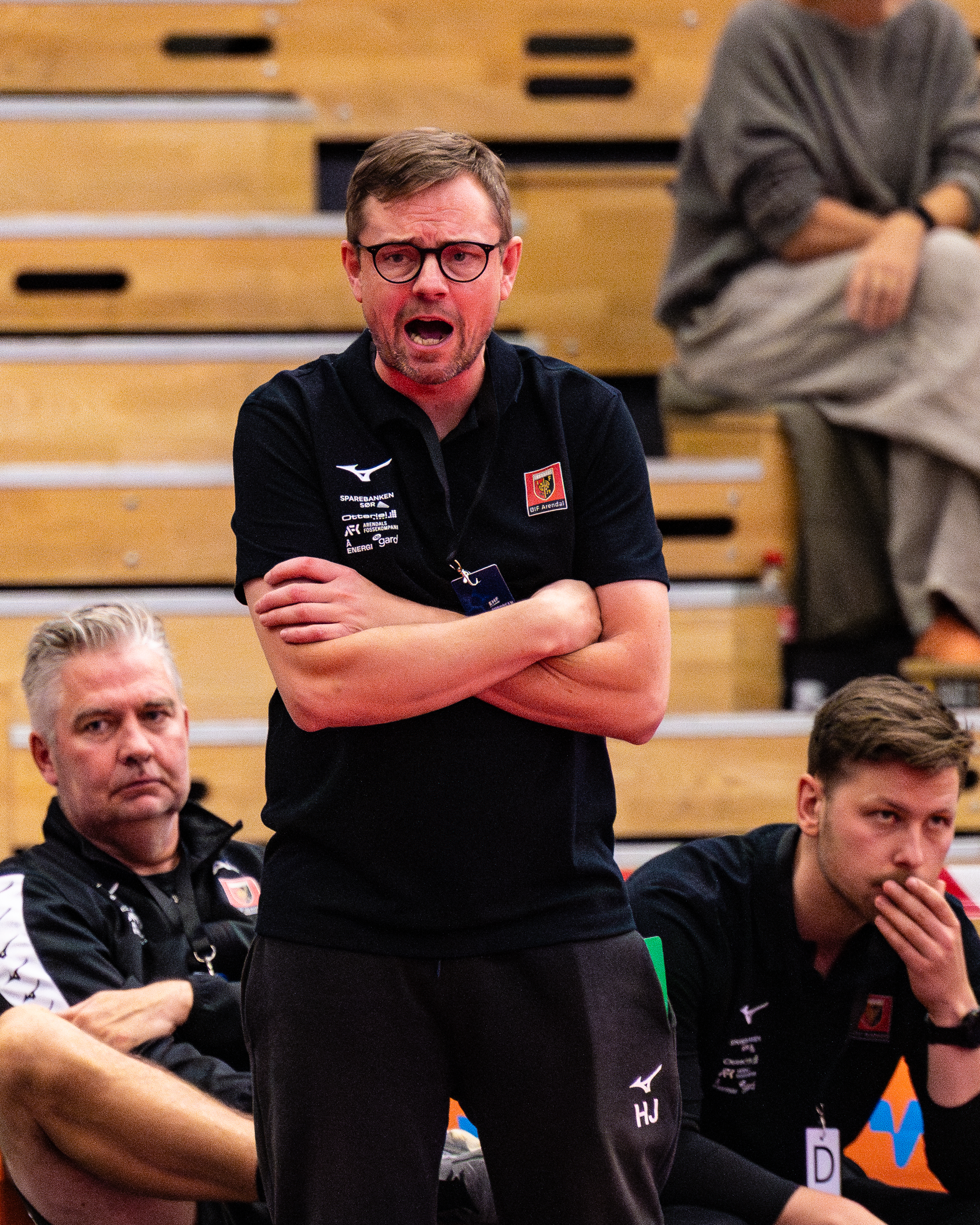

Personal information
- Full name: Heine Ernst Jensen
- Nationality: Danish
- Born: 11 February 1977 (age 49) Thisted, Denmark

Sport
- Sport: Handball
- Current club: China (head coach); Sandnes HK

Teams managed
- Years: Team
- 2002–2003: Sindaf IF
- 2003–2005: Stord IL
- 2005–2007: Sola HK
- 2007–2008: SV Union Halle-Neustadt
- 2008–2011: HC Leipzig
- 2011–2014: Germany (women)
- 2015–2016: HG Saarlouis
- 2018–2019: Slovakia (men)
- 2019–: Sandnes HK
- 2019–: China (women)

Heine Ernst Jensen (born 11 February 1977) is a Danish handball coach of the Chinese national team and Sandnes HK.

He participated with the Germany at the 2011 World Women's Handball Championship in Brazil.
