= Ruth João =

Angolan national handball player (born 1998)

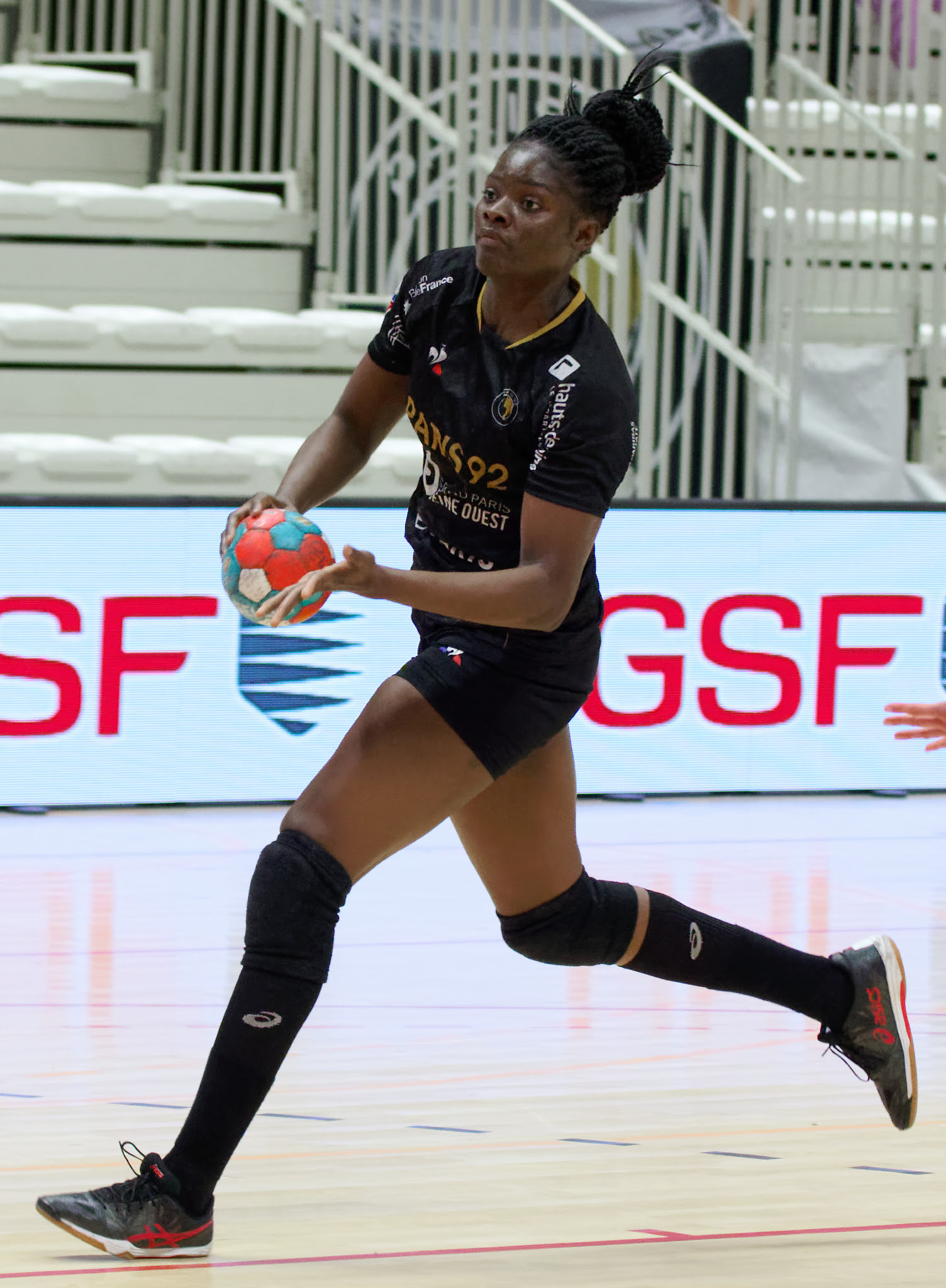
- Ruth João (2022)

Personal information
- Nationality: Angolan
- Born: 17 October 1998 (age 28) Luanda, Angola
- Height: 1.82 m (6 ft 0 in)

Sport
- Sport: Handball
- Position: Pivot
- Current club: SCM Craiova
- Number: 88
National team
Years	Team	Apps	(Gls)
–	Angola	13	(0)

Ruth João (born 17 October 1998) is an Angolan handball player for SCM Craiova and the Angolan national team.

She represented Angola at the 2019 World Women's Handball Championship.
