= Khady Seck =

Senegalese handball player

Personal information
- Nationality: Senegalese
- Born: 10 March 2000 (age 26)
- Height: 1.78 m (5 ft 10 in)

Sport
- Sport: Handball
- Position: Right wing
- Current club: Diadji Sarr
National team
- Years: Team
- –: Senegal
Medal record
African Championship
Silver medal – second place	2024 Kinshasa

Khady Seck (born 10 March 2000) is a Senegalese handball player for Diadji Sarr and the Senegalese national team.

She competed at the 2019 World Women's Handball Championship in Japan.
