= Tatyana Davydova =

Kazakhstani handball player

Personal information
- Nationality: Kazakhstani
- Born: 26 June 2000 (age 26)
- Height: 1.73 m (5 ft 8 in)

Sport
- Sport: Handball
- Position: Goalkeeper
- Current club: Kaysar Club
National team
Years	Team	Apps	(Gls)
–	Kazakhstan	27	(0)
Medal record
Asian Championship
Bronze medal – third place	2021 Jordan
Bronze medal – third place	2024 India

Tatyana Davydova (born 26 June 2000) is a Kazakhstani handball player for Kaysar Club and the Kazakhstani national team.

She represented Kazakhstan at the 2019 World Women's Handball Championship.
