= Adja Sanou Paye =

Senegalese handball player

Personal information
- Nationality: Senegalese
- Born: 26 September 1989 (age 37) Grenoble, France
- Height: 1.70 m (5 ft 7 in)

Sport
- Sport: Handball
- Position: Left wing
- Current club: Rouen Handball
National team
- Years: Team
- –: Senegal

Adja Sanou Paye (born 26 September 1989) is a Senegalese handball player for French club Rouen Handball and the Senegalese national team.

She competed at the 2019 World Women's Handball Championship in Japan.
