= Valentina Sitnikova =

Kazakhstani handball player

Personal information
- Nationality: Kazakhstani
- Born: 10 November 1998 (age 27)
- Height: 1.65 m (5 ft 5 in)

Sport
- Sport: Handball
- Position: Pivot
- Current club: HC Shymkent

Senior clubs
- Years: Team
- –: Kazygurt Handball
- –: HC Shymkent
National team
Years	Team	Apps	(Gls)
–	Kazakhstan	36	(38)
- Updated on 29 November 2023

Valentina Sitnikova (born 10 November 1998) is a Kazakhstani handball player for HC Shymkent and the Kazakhstani national team.

She represented Kazakhstan at the 2019 and 2023 World Championships.
