= Marieme Ba =

Senegalese handball player

Personal information
- Nationality: Senegalese
- Born: 22 April 1998 (age 28)

Sport
- Sport: Handball
- Position: Left back
- Current club: US Alfortville
National team
- Years: Team
- –: Senegal
Medal record
African Championship
Silver medal – second place	2024 Kinshasa

Marieme Ba (born 22 April 1998) is a Senegalese handball player for US Alfortville and the Senegalese national team.

She competed at the 2019 World Women's Handball Championship in Japan.
