= Laety Ombala =

Congolese handball player

Personal information
- Full name: Laety Ombala Ayunga
- Nationality: Congolese
- Born: 17 January 1999 (age 27)
- Height: 1.78 m (5 ft 10 in)

Sport
- Sport: Handball
- Position: Left back
- Current club: Aulnay Handball
National team
- Years: Team
- –: DR Congo

Laety Ombala Ayunga (born 17 January 1999) is a Congolese handball player for Aulnay Handball and the DR Congo national team.

She represented DR Congo at the 2019 World Women's Handball Championship.
