= Berik Beknazarov =

Kazakhstani handball coach

Berik Beknazarov is a Kazakhstani handball coach of the Kazakhstani national team.

He coached the Kazakhstani team at the 2019 World Women's Handball Championship.
