= Hu Xiaoying =

Chinese handball player (born 1998)

Personal information
- Nationality: Chinese
- Born: 18 April 1998 (age 28)
- Height: 1.78 m (5 ft 10 in)

Sport
- Sport: Handball
- Position: Goalkeeper
- Current club: Shanghai Handball
National team
Years	Team	Apps	(Gls)
2019–	China	1	(0)

Hu Xiaoying (born 18 April 1998) is a Chinese handball player for Shanghai Handball and the Chinese national team.

She represented China at the 2019 World Women's Handball Championship in Japan, where the Chinese team placed 23rd.
