= Ndiole Sène =

Senegalese handball player

Personal information
- Nationality: Senegalese
- Born: 7 February 2003 (age 23)

Sport
- Sport: Handball
- Position: Centre back
- Current club: Espoir du Walo
National team
- Years: Team
- –: Senegal

Ndiole Sène (born 7 February 2003) is a Senegalese handball player for Espoir du Walo and the Senegalese national team.

She competed at the 2019 World Women's Handball Championship in Japan.
