= Prescyllia Engala =

Congolese handball player

Personal information
- Full name: Prescyllia Engala Lokako
- Nationality: Congolese
- Born: 30 December 1991 (age 34)
- Height: 1.69 m (5 ft 7 in)

Sport
- Sport: Handball
- Position: Centre back
- Current club: Aulnay Handball
National team
- Years: Team
- –: DR Congo

Prescyllia Engala Lokako (born 30 December 1991) is a Congolese handball player for Aulnay Handball and the DR Congo national team.

She represented DR Congo at the 2019 World Women's Handball Championship.
