= Cira Aram Lo =

Senegalese handball player (born 1996)

Cira-Aram Lo
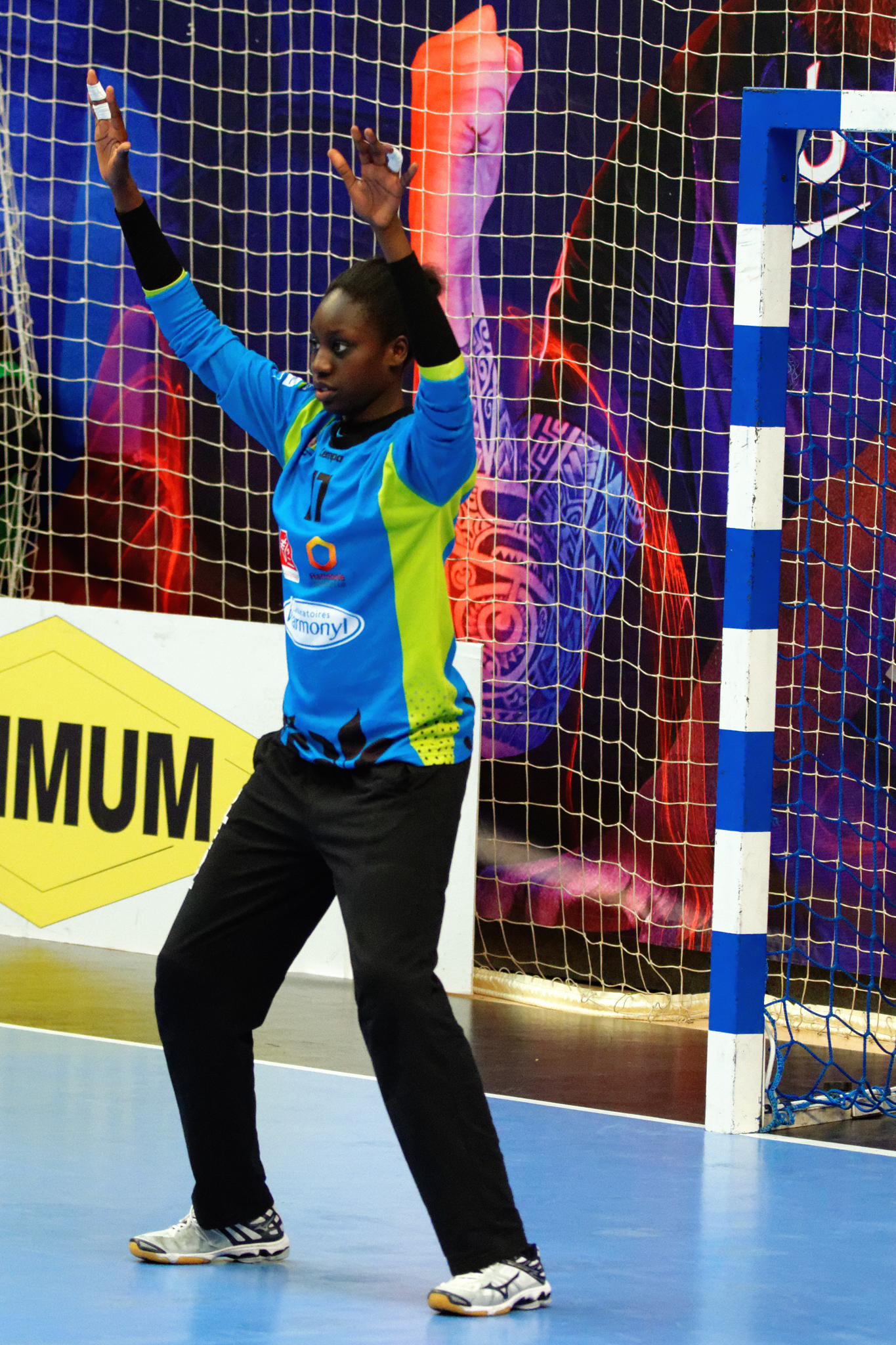
- Lo in April 2016

Personal information
- Nationality: France, Senegal
- Born: 22 November 1996 (age 29) Lagny-sur-Marne, France
- Height: 1.83 m (6 ft 0 in)

Sport
- Sport: Handball
- Position: Goalkeeper
- Current club: Rouen Handball
- Number: 30

Senior clubs
- Years: Team
- 2014-2018: Nantes Loire Féminin Handball
- 2018-2019: Noisy-le-Grand Handball
- 2019-2021: AS Cannes Mandelieu Handball
- 2021-: Rouen Handball
National team
- Years: Team
- –: Senegal

Cira-Aram Lo (born 22 November 1996) is a Franco-Senegalese handball player for Rouen Handball and the Senegalese national team. During her professional career she played for Nantes Loire Atlantique HB, Noisy le Grand HB, AS Cannes Mandelieu and Rouen Handball.

She competed at the 2019 World Women's Handball Championship in Japan.
