= Zhou Yuting =

Chinese handball player (born 1995)

Personal information
- Nationality: Chinese
- Born: 26 October 1995 (age 30)
- Height: 1.78 m (5 ft 10 in)

Sport
- Sport: Handball
- Position: Centre back
- Current club: Shandong Handball
National team
Years	Team	Apps	(Gls)
–	China	47	(95)

Zhou Yuting (born 26 October 1995) is a Chinese handball player for Shandong Handball and the Chinese national team.

She represented China at the 2019 World Women's Handball Championship in Japan, where the Chinese team placed 23rd.
