= Cecilia Errin =

Congolese handball player

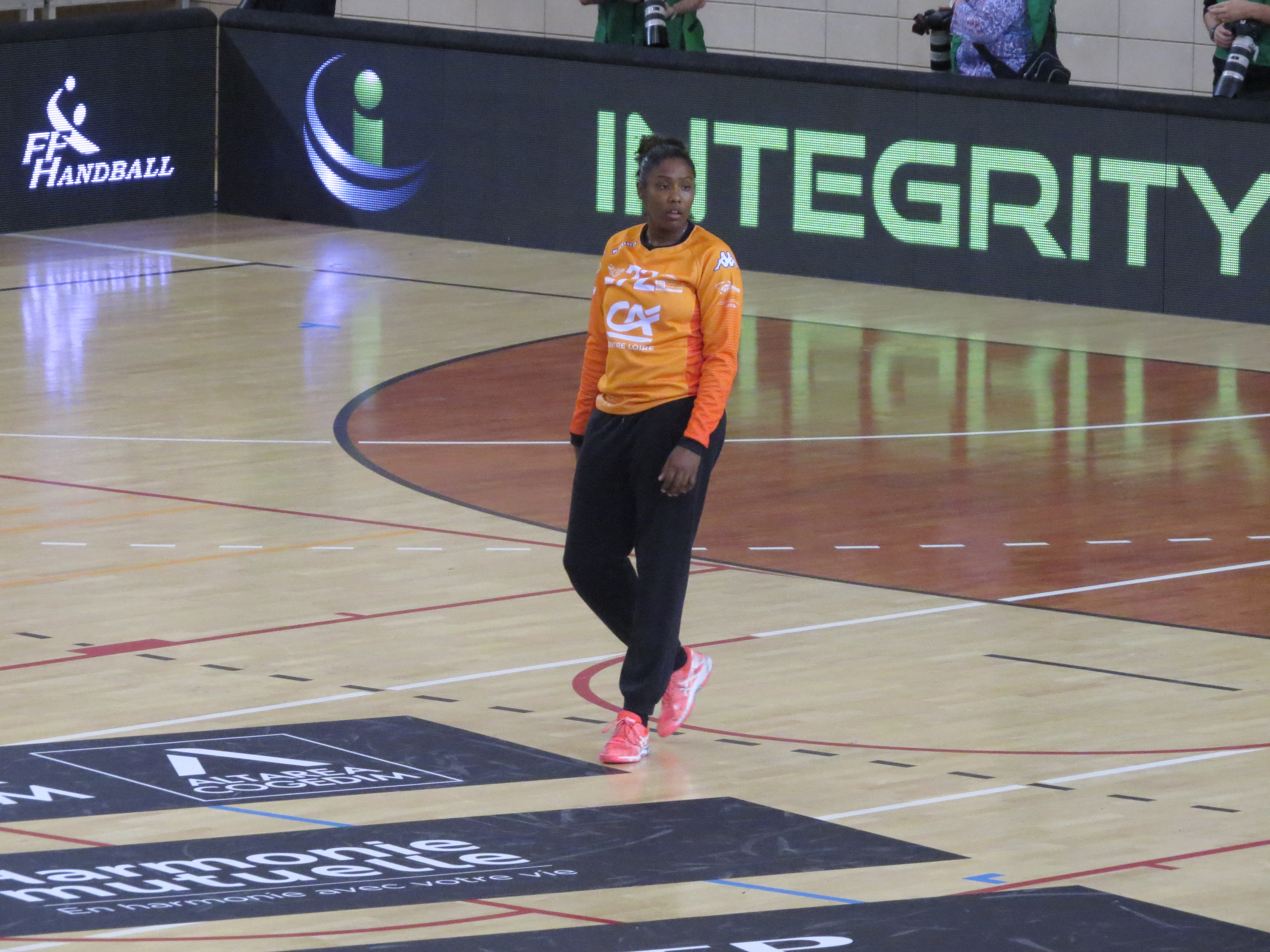

Personal information
- Nationality: Congolese
- Born: 13 December 1998 (age 27) Pointe-à-Pitre, Guadeloupe
- Height: 1.85 m (6 ft 1 in)

Sport
- Sport: Handball
- Position: Goalkeeper
- Current club: Handball Octeville-sur-Mer
National team
- Years: Team
- –: DR Congo

Cecilia Errin (born 13 December 1998) is a Congolese handball player for Handball Octeville-sur-Mer and the DR Congo national team.

She represented DR Congo at the 2019 World Women's Handball Championship.
