= Françoise Tshibola =

Congolese handball player

Personal information
- Full name: Françoise Tshibola Kashala
- Nationality: Congolese
- Born: 28 December 1994 (age 31)
- Height: 1.61 m (5 ft 3 in)

Sport
- Sport: Handball
- Position: Goalkeeper
- Current club: HC Heritage
National team
- Years: Team
- –: DR Congo

Françoise Tshibola Kashala (born 28 December 1994) is a Congolese handball player for HC Heritage and the DR Congo national team.

She represented DR Congo at the 2019 World Women's Handball Championship.
