= Huang Haiyu =

Chinese handball player (born 2000)

Personal information
- Nationality: Chinese
- Born: 9 February 2000 (age 26)
- Height: 1.68 m (5 ft 6 in)

Sport
- Sport: Handball
- Position: Right wing
- Current club: Guangxi Handball
National team
Years	Team	Apps	(Gls)
2019-	China	4	(0)

Huang Haiyu (born 9 February 2000) is a Chinese handball player for Guangxi Handball and the Chinese national team.

She represented China at the 2019 World Women's Handball Championship in Japan, where the Chinese team placed 23rd.
