= Amália Pinto =

Angolan national women's handball player

Personal information
- Nationality: Angolan
- Born: 12 June 1996 (age 30)
- Height: 1.76 m (5 ft 9 in)

Sport
- Sport: Handball
- Position: Goalkeeper
- Current club: Primeiro de Agosto
- Number: 20
National team
Years	Team	Apps	(Gls)
2019–	Angola	7	(0)

Amália Pinto (born 12 June 1996) is an Angolan handball player for Primeiro de Agosto and the Angolan national team.

She represented Angola at the 2019 World Women's Handball Championship.
