= Awa Fall Diop =

Senegalese handball player (born 1991)

Personal information
- Nationality: Senegalese / French
- Born: 21 June 1991 (age 35) Strasbourg, France
- Height: 1.67 m (5 ft 6 in)

Sport
- Sport: Handball
- Position: Left wing
- Current club: ATH Achenheim

Senior clubs
- Years: Team
- 2008-2009: ES Besançon
- 2009-2012: Brest Bretagne Handball
- 2012-2013: Celles-sur-Belle Handball
- 2013-2014: Nantes LAH
- 2014-: ATH Achenheim
National team
- Years: Team
- 2015-: Senegal

Awa Fall Diop (born 21 June 1991) is a Senegalese-French handball player for ATH Achenheim and the Senegalese national team.

She competed at the 2019 World Women's Handball Championship in Japan.
