= Niacalin Kanté =

Senegalese handball player

Personal information
- Nationality: Senegalese
- Born: 30 November 1990 (age 35)
- Height: 1.67 m (5 ft 6 in)

Sport
- Sport: Handball
- Position: Right wing
- Current club: Sambre Avesnois Handball
- Number: 19
National team
- Years: Team
- –: Senegal

Hawa N'Diaye (born 30 November 1990) is a Senegalese handball player for Sambre Avesnois Handball and the Senegalese national team.

She competed at the 2019 World Women's Handball Championship in Japan.
