= Raissa Yalibi =

Congolese handball player

Personal information
- Nationality: Congolese
- Born: 11 March 1992 (age 34)
- Height: 1.67 m (5 ft 6 in)

Sport
- Sport: Handball
- Position: Centre back
- Current club: HC Heritage
National team
- Years: Team
- –: DR Congo

Raissa Yalibi (born 11 March 1992) is a Congolese handball player for HC Heritage and the DR Congo national team.

She represented DR Congo at the 2019 World Women's Handball Championship.
