= Audrey Nganmogne =

DR Congolese handball player (born 1994)

Personal information
- Full name: Audrey Murielle Nganmogne
- Nationality: French, DR Congolese
- Born: 14 November 1994 (age 31) Yaoundé, Cameroon
- Height: 1.78 m (5 ft 10 in)

Sport
- Sport: Handball
- Position: Goalkeeper
- Current club: Mérignac Handball
- Number: 94

Senior clubs
- Years: Team
- -2012: Issy Paris Hand
- 2012-2013: Chambray Touraine Handball
- 2013-2014: Le Havre AC
- 2014-?: CJF Fleury
- -2020: Merignac Handball
- 2020-: SPUC
National team
- Years: Team
- –: DR Congo

Audrey Murielle Nganmogne (born 14 November 1994) is a handball player who plays as a goalkeeper for Mérignac Handball. Born in Cameroon, she plays for the DR Congo women's national team. She also holds French citizenship.

She represented DR Congo at the 2019 World Women's Handball Championship. Previously, she played for France junior.

She also played for Issy Paris (-2012), Chambray Touraine Handball (2012–2013), Le Havre AC Handball (2013–2014), CJF Fleury Loiret Handball (2014-), Mérignac Handball (-2020), SPUC (2020-).
