= Estel Memana =

Congolese handball player

Personal information
- Full name: Estel Memana Daniele
- Nationality: French
- Born: 5 August 1997 (age 29)
- Height: 1.72 m (5 ft 8 in)

Sport
- Sport: Handball
- Position: Left wing
- Current club: Brest Bretagne Handball
- Number: 17

Senior clubs
- Years: Team
- 2016–2019: ASUL Vaulx-en-Velin
- 2019–2022: Chambray Touraine Handball
- 2022–: Brest Bretagne Handball
National team
- Years: Team
- –: DR Congo

Estel Memana Daniele (born 5 August 1997) is a Congolese handball player for Brest Bretagne Handball and the DR Congo national team.

She represented DR Congo at the 2019 World Women's Handball Championship.
