= Lyu Qingwen =

Chinese handball player (born 1998)

Personal information
- Nationality: Chinese
- Born: 22 May 1998 (age 28)
- Height: 1.68 m (5 ft 6 in)

Sport
- Sport: Handball
- Position: Left wing
- Current club: Shandong Handball
National team
Years	Team	Apps	(Gls)
–	China	46	(91)

Lyu Qingwen (born 22 May 1998) is a Chinese handball player for Shandong Handball and the Chinese national team.

She represented China at the 2019 World Women's Handball Championship.
