= Cynthia Liandja =

Congolese handball player

Personal information
- Full name: Cynthia Liandja Ngoy
- Nationality: Congolese
- Born: 7 October 1995 (age 31)
- Height: 1.75 m (5 ft 9 in)

Sport
- Sport: Handball
- Position: Right back
- Current club: Handball Plan-de-Cuques
National team
- Years: Team
- –: DR Congo

Cynthia Liandja Ngoy (born 7 October 1995) is a Congolese handball player for Handball Plan-de-Cuques and the DR Congo national team.

She represented DR Congo at the 2019 World Women's Handball Championship.
