= Eduardo Gallardo =

Argentine handball coach (born 1969)

Personal information
- Full name: Eduardo Vincente Gallardo
- Born: 20 April 1969 (age 57) Buenos Aires, Argentina

Sport
- Sport: Handball

Teams managed
- Years: Team
- 1988–2019: River Plate
- –: Argentina men youth
- –: Argentina men junior
- 2008–2017: Argentina men
- 2018–: Argentina women
Medal record
Men's Handball
Pan American Games
Gold medal – first place	2011 Guadalajara	Team
Silver medal – second place	2015 Toronto	Team
Pan American Championship
Gold medal – first place	2010 Chile
Gold medal – first place	2012 Argentina
Gold medal – first place	2014 Uruguay
Bronze medal – third place	2016 Argentina
South American Games
Silver medal – second place	2010 Medellin
Silver medal – second place	2014 Viña del Mar
Women's Handball
South and Central American Championship
Silver medal – second place	2018 Brazil
Silver medal – second place	2021 Paraguay

Eduardo Vincente Gallardo (born 20th April, 1969 in Buenos Aires) is an Argentine handball coach, who has coached both the Argentina men's and Argentina women's national team.

== Coaching career ==
He started his coaching career at Club Atlético River Plate in 1988, and coached them for 19 years, winning more than 50 titles. He then went on to coach Argentina youth national teams. At the 2007 U19 World Championship, he led the team to the semifinal, where they lost to eventual champions Denmark. At the 2009 U21 World Championship he finished 6th with the Argentine team.

=== Argentina Men ===
In 2008 became the head coach of the Argentina men's senior national team. By winning gold medals at the 2011 Pan American Games in Guadalajara, he managed to qualify the team for the 2012 Summer Olympics. At the 2012 Summer Olympics the team finished 10th.

At the 2015 Pan American Games, he won a silver medal, losing to Brazil in the final. This also meant that Argentina had qualified the team for the 2016 Summer Olympics in Rio de Janeiro, as Brazil had already qualified as the host.

At the 2016 Olympics, Argentina finished 10th out of 12.

He also led the team to 5 IHF World Championships, At the 2011 World Championship, he led the team to a 12th place, which was the best result of any non-European team.

He also won gold medals at the 2010, 2012 Pan American Men's Handball Championship, and 2014 Pan American Men's Handball Championships.

=== Argentina Women ===
In 2018 he took over as the head coach of the Argentina women's national team instead. He led them at the 2019, 2021 and 2023 World Women's Handball Championship.

At the 2018 and 2021 South and Central American Women's Handball Championship he won silver medals, losing to Brazil on both occasions.

== Other work ==
In addition to coaching, Gallardo has been on the International Handball Federation commission of coaching and methods, and delivered coaching courses on behalf on the International Handball Federation.
