= Jorge Coll (handballer) =

Cuban handball coach (born 1968)

Jorge Coll Arencibia (born 19 December 1968) is a Cuban handball coach of the Cuban national team.

He coached the Cuban team at the 2019 World Women's Handball Championship.
