= Kim Su-yeon (handballer) =

South Korean handball player (born 1998)

Personal information
- Nationality: South Korean
- Born: 2 June 1998 (age 28)
- Height: 1.82 m (6 ft 0 in)

Sport
- Sport: Handball
- Position: Goalkeeper

Youth career
- Years: Team
- –: Incheon Business High School

Senior clubs
- Years: Team
- –: Korea National Sport University
- –: Busan Facilities Management Handball Team
National team
Years	Team	Apps
–	South Korea	13
Medal record
Junior World Championship
Bronze medal – third place	2018 Hungary
Youth World Championship
Bronze medal – third place	2016 Slovakia
Asian Junior Championship
Gold medal – first place	2017 Hong Kong
Asian Youth Championship
Gold medal – first place	2015 India

Kim Su-yeon (Korean: 김수연; born 2 June 1998) is a South Korean handball player for the Busan Facilities Management Handball Team and the South Korean national team.

She participated at the 2019 World Women's Handball Championship.
