= Real Madrid Balonmano =

Spanish handball club

Real Madrid
- Full name: Real Madrid Balonmano
- Nickname: Merengues
- Founded: March 22, 1952; 73 years ago
- Dissolved: 1959; 66 years ago
- Arena: Estadio Chamartín, Madrid (11-a-side); Frontón Recoletos, Madrid (7-a-side)
- Capacity: ?
- League: Liga ASOBAL
- 1958–59: ?
Home	Away

Real Madrid Balonmano was the handball section of Real Madrid C.F. The team participated in the Liga ASOBAL, the Spanish Handball National Championship, between the year of its creation –1952– until 1959 when the team was dissolved. Real Madrid took part of both handball codes existing by then, "eleven" (11 players per side) and "seven" (7 players).

== History ==
Created in 1952, Real Madrid Balonmano or Real Madrid BM was considered one of the Spanish handball most tough team that had competed at national level, along with its rival Atlético Madrid BM. The team won the 1952–53 season of Liga ASOBAL (the premier 7-a-side handball league of the country, organised by the "Asociación de Clubes de Balonmano de España" - ASOBAL)

Although Real Madrid made good campaigns in successive years, the club decided to close the section in 1959.

== Home arenas ==
City	Arena's name	Term
Madrid	Estadio Chamartín (11-a-side)	1952–1959
Madrid	Frontón Recoletos (7-a-side)	1952–1959

== Titles ==
- Liga ASOBAL (1): 1952–53

== See also ==
- Real Madrid Rugby
- Real Madrid Voleibol
