= Nadia Bordon =

Argentine handball player

Personal information
- Full name: Nadia Ayelen Bordon
- Nationality: Argentinian
- Born: 11 August 1988 (age 38)
- Height: 1.79 m (5 ft 10 in)

Sport
- Sport: Handball
- Position: Goalkeeper
- Current club: CA Lanús
National team
Years	Team	Apps	(Gls)
–	Argentina	68	(1)
Medal record
Pan American Games
Silver medal – second place	2019 Lima	Team
Pan American Championship
Silver medal – second place	2017 Argentina
South American Games
Silver medal – second place	2018 Cochabamba	Team

Nadia Ayelen Bordon (born 11 August 1988) is an Argentinian handball goalkeeper for CA Lanús and the Argentina national team.

She represented Argentina at the 2013 World Women's Handball Championship in Serbia.
