= Jaqueline Anastácio =

Brazilian handball player (born 1987)

Personal information
- Born: 9 November 1987 (age 38) Varginha, Brazil
- Height: 1.74 m (5 ft 9 in)

Sport
- Sport: Handball
- Position: Left back
- Current club: BM Remudas

Senior clubs
- Years: Team
- 2008–2010: Universidade Metodista
- 2010–2011: Siófok KC
- 2011–2012: Gjøvik HK
- 2012–2014: Dinamo Volgograd
- 2014–2015: Ringkøbing Håndbold
- 2015–2016: SG BBM Bietigheim
- 2016–2017: Kastamonu GSK
- 2017–2018: Polatlı BSK
- 2018–2019: Maccabi Srugo Rishon Lezion
- 2019: CS Măgura Cisnădie
- 2020: BM Remudas
- 2020–: MKS Lublin
National team
Years	Team	Apps	(Gls)
–	Brazil	93	(159)
- Updated on 16 September 2023

Jaqueline Anastácio (born 9 November 1987) is a Brazilian handball player for BM Remudas and the Brazilian national team.

She has earlier played for Universidade Metodista, Siófok KC, Gjøvik HK, Dinamo Volgograd, Ringkøbing Håndbold, SG BBM Bietigheim, Kastamonu GSK, Polatlı BSK, and Maccabi Srugo Rishon Lezion. She competed for Brazil at the 2009 World Women's Handball Championship in China. She was selected to represent Brazil at the 2019 World Women's Handball Championship in Japan.
