= Schakira Robert =

Cuban handball player (born 1996)

Personal information
- Full name: Schakira Robert Reinoso
- Nationality: Cuban
- Born: 5 September 1996 (age 30)
- Height: 1.77 m (5 ft 10 in)

Sport
- Sport: Handball
- Position: Left back
- Current club: Balonmano Montequinto
National team
Years	Team	Apps	(Gls)
–	Cuba	27	(48)
Medal record
Pan American Games
Bronze medal – third place	2019 Lima	Team
Central American and Caribbean Games
Bronze medal – third place	2018 Barranquilla	Team

Schakira Robert Reinoso (born 5 September 1996) is a Cuban handball player for La Habana and the Cuban national team.

She represented Cuba at the 2019 World Women's Handball Championship.
