= Victoria Crivelli =

Argentine handball player

Personal information
- Born: 30 September 1990 (age 36) Buenos Aires, Argentina
- Height: 1.74 m (5 ft 9 in)

Sport
- Sport: Handball
- Position: Centre back
- Current club: Ferro Carril Oeste
National team
| Years | Team | Apps | (Gls) |
| – | Argentina | 159 | (188) |
Medal record
Pan American Games
| Silver medal – second place | 2015 Toronto | Team |
| Silver medal – second place | 2019 Lima | Team |
Pan American Championship
| Silver medal – second place | 2017 Argentina |
| Bronze medal – third place | 2015 Cuba |
South and Central American Championship
| Silver medal – second place | 2018 Brazil |
| Silver medal – second place | 2021 Paraguay |
South American Games
| Silver medal – second place | 2018 Cochabamba | Team |
| Bronze medal – third place | 2022 Asunción | Team |

Victoria Crivelli (born 30 September 1990) is an Argentine handball player for Ferro Carril Oeste and the Argentina national team.

She participated at the 2011 World Women's Handball Championship in Brazil.

In Argentina, she currently plays for Ferro Carril Oeste, where she won the 2013 and 2014 Metropolitan Apertura Tournament, as well as the 2014 National Championship.

== Titles ==
- Argentinean Clubs Championship: 2015

== Individual awards and achievements ==
=== Best playmaker ===
- 2016 Pan American Women's Club Handball Championship
