= Patrícia Matieli =

Brazilian handball player (born 1988)

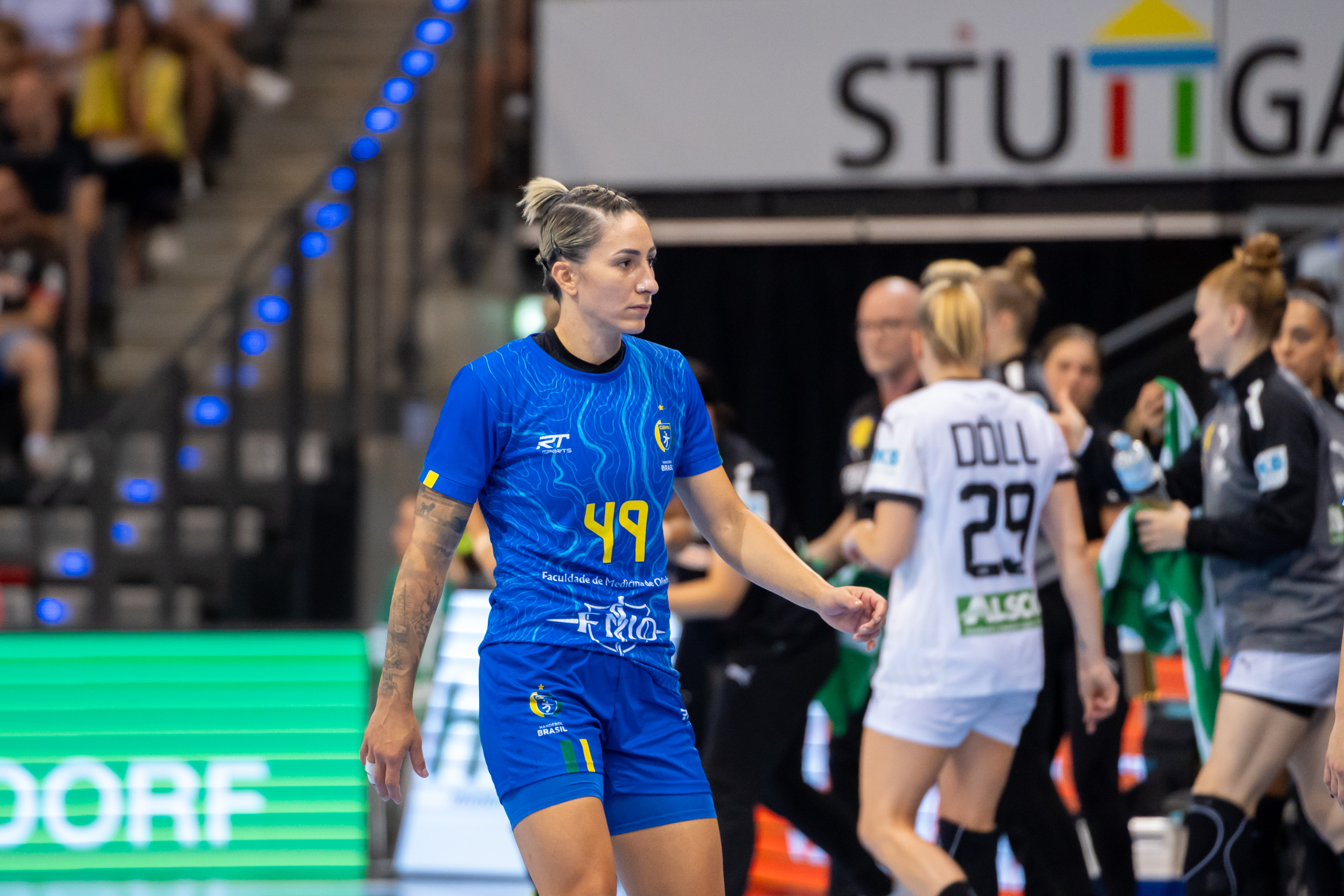

Personal information
- Full name: Patrícia Matieli Machado
- Born: 8 November 1988 (age 37) Rio de Janeiro, Brazil
- Height: 1.68 m (5 ft 6 in)

Sport
- Sport: Handball
- Position: Centre back
- Current club: MKS Zagłębie Lubin
- Number: 49

Senior clubs
- Years: Team
- –2015: São Bernardo do Campo (SP)
- 2015–2018: GTPR Gdynia
- 2018–: MKS Zagłębie Lubin
National team
Years	Team	Apps	(Gls)
–	Brazil	109	(169)
Medal record
Pan American Games
Gold medal – first place	2019 Lima	Team
Gold medal – first place	2023 Santiago	Team
South and Central American Championship
Gold medal – first place	2018 Brazil
Gold medal – first place	2021 Paraguay
Gold medal – first place	2022 Argentina
Gold medal – first place	2024 Brazil
South American Games
Gold medal – first place	2018 Cochabamba	Team

Patrícia Matieli Machado (born 8 November 1988) is a Brazilian handballer for MKS Zagłębie Lubin and the Brazilian national team.

She participated at the Olimpic Games Tokyo 2020 and Olimpic Games Paris 2024.

== Achievements ==
=== National team ===
Pan American Games:

- Winner: 2019
- Winner: 2023

South American Games :

- Winner: 2018

South and Central American Women's Handball Championship:

- Winner: 2018
- Winner: 2021
- Winner: 2022
- Winner: 2024

World Women's Handball Championship:

- 18th: 2017
- 17th: 2019
- 06th: 2021
- 09th: 2023

=== Domestic competitions ===
Polish Superleague:

- Winner: 2016/2017- 2020/2021 - 2021/2022 - 2022/2023 - 2023/2024 - 2024/2025 - 2025/2026
- 2nd Place: 2018/2019 - 2019/2020
- 3rd Place: 2015/2016

Puchar Polski:

- Winner: 2015/2016 - 2018/2019 - 2019/2020 - 2020/2021 - 2022/2023 - 2023/2024 - 2024/2025 - 2025/2026
- 2nd Place: 2021/2022

SuperPuchar Polski:

- Winner: 2024/2025 - 2025/2026

Brazil National League:

- Winner: 2014 - 2015

== Individual awards ==
Polish Superleague

- Best Centre Back of the Season: 2019/2020 - 2020/2021 - 2021/2022 - 2022/2023 - 2023/2024
- Best Player of the Match: 7x (Season 2020/2021)
- Best Player of the Match: 8x (Season 2021/2022)
- Best Player of the Match: 6x (Season 2022/2023)
- Best Player of the Match: 5x (Season 2023/2024)
