= Arisleidy Márquez =

Cuban handball player (born 1993)

Personal information
- Full name: Arisleidy Márquez Herrera
- Nationality: Cuban
- Born: 24 November 1993 (age 32)
- Height: 1.82 m (6 ft 0 in)

Sport
- Sport: Handball
- Position: Pivot
- Current club: Pinar del Rio
National team
Years	Team	Apps	(Gls)
–	Cuba	27	(22)
Medal record
Pan American Games
Bronze medal – third place	2019 Lima	Team

Arisleidy Márquez Herrera (born 24 November 1993) is a Cuban handball player who plays for Pinar del Rio and the Cuban national team.

She represented Cuba at the 2019 World Women's Handball Championship.
