= Yennifer Toledo =

Cuban handball player (born 2000)

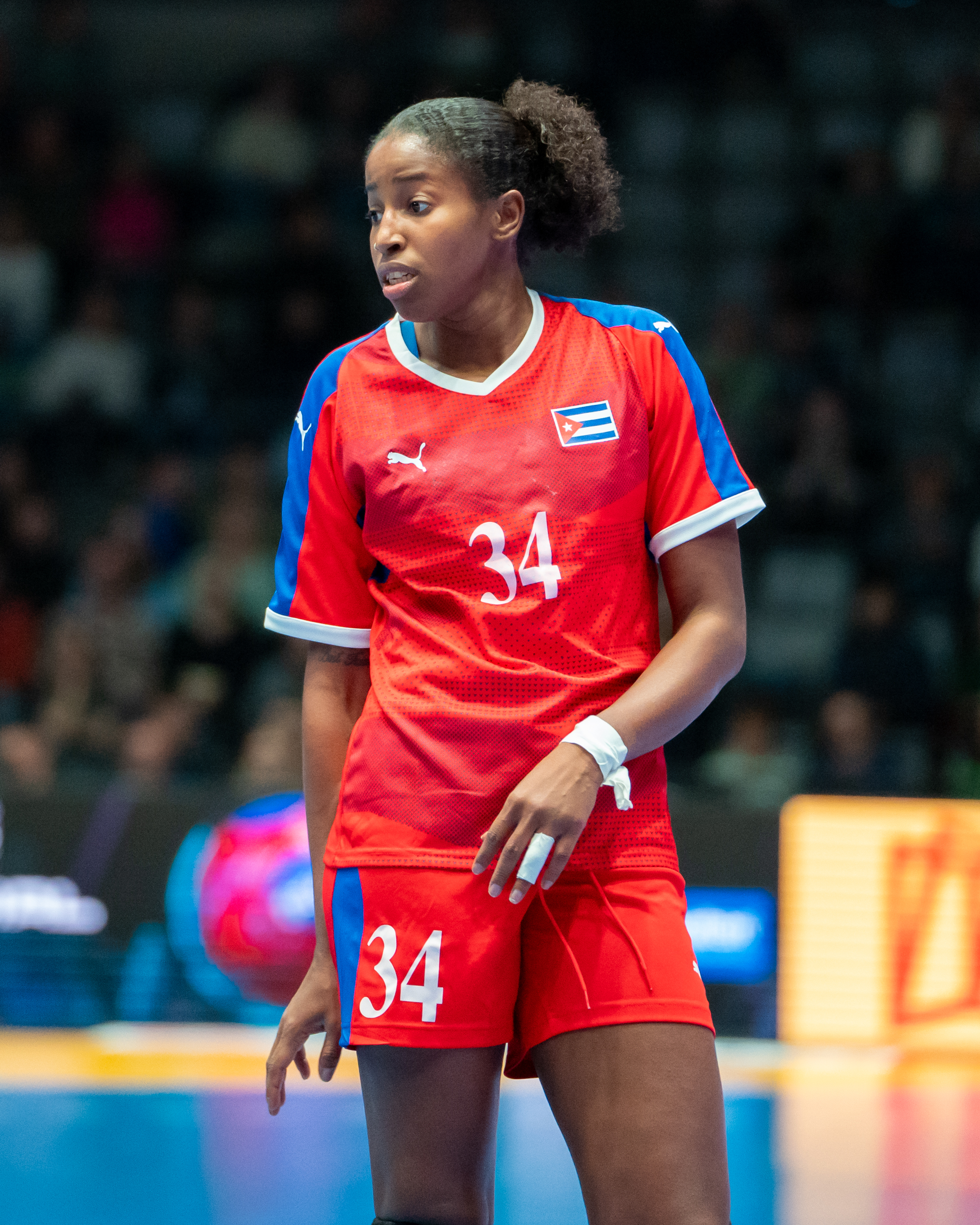

Personal information
- Full name: Yennifer Amanda Toledo Abreu
- Nationality: Cuban
- Born: 1 October 2000 (age 26)
- Height: 1.82 m (6 ft 0 in)

Sport
- Sport: Handball
- Position: Left wing
- Current club: Villa Clara
National team
Years	Team	Apps	(Gls)
–	Cuba	27	(43)
Medal record
Pan American Games
Bronze medal – third place	2019 Lima	Team
Central American and Caribbean Games
Gold medal – first place	2023 San Salvador	Team
Bronze medal – third place	2018 Barranquilla	Team

Yennifer Amanda Toledo Abreu (born 1 October 2000) is a Cuban handball player for Villa Clara and the Cuban national team.

She represented Cuba at the 2019 World Women's Handball Championship.
