= Liliamnis Rosabal =

Cuban handball player (born 1999)

Personal information
- Full name: Liliamnis Rosabal Salazar
- Nationality: Cuban
- Born: 3 July 1999 (age 27)
- Height: 1.67 m (5 ft 6 in)

Sport
- Sport: Handball
- Position: Right back
- Current club: Granma
National team
Years	Team	Apps	(Gls)
–	Cuba	29	(35)
Medal record
Pan American Games
Bronze medal – third place	2019 Lima	Team

Liliamnis Rosabal Salazar (born 3 July 1999) is a Cuban handball player for Granma and the Cuban national team.

She competed at the 2015 World Women's Handball Championship in Denmark.
