= Rosario Urban =

Argentine handball player

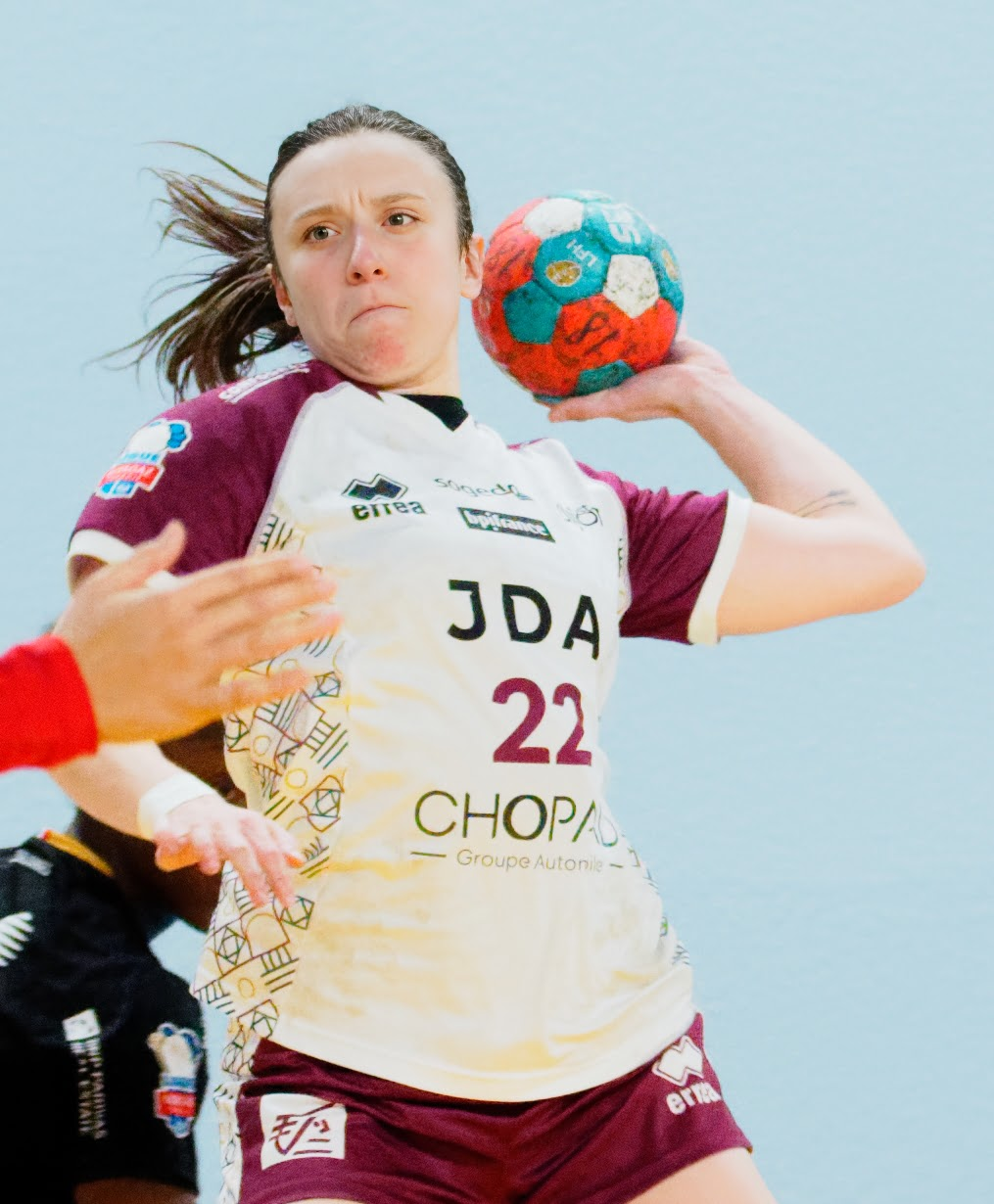
- Rosario Urban Medel (2022)

Personal information
- Full name: Rosario Victoria Urban Medel
- Born: 13 March 1997 (age 29) Buenos Aires, Argentina
- Height: 1.67 m (5 ft 6 in)

Sport
- Sport: Handball
- Position: Right wing
- Current club: Jeanne d'Arc Dijon Handball
- Number: 22

Senior clubs
- Years: Team
- 2016–2021: CB Atlético Guardés
- 2021–: Jeanne d'Arc Dijon Handball
National team
Years	Team	Apps	(Gls)
–	Argentina	47	(87)
Medal record
Pan American Games
Silver medal – second place	2019 Lima	Team
Pan American Championship
Silver medal – second place	2017 Argentina
South and Central American Championship
Silver medal – second place	2018 Brazil
Silver medal – second place	2021 Paraguay
Silver medal – second place	2022 Argentina
Silver medal – second place	2024 Brazil
South American Games
Silver medal – second place	2018 Cochabamba	Team
Pan American Junior Championship
Silver medal – second place	2016 Brazil

Rosario Victoria Urban Medel (born 13 March 1997) is an Argentine handball player for Jeanne d'Arc Dijon Handball and the Argentine national team .

She was selected to represent Argentina at the 2017 World Women's Handball Championship.

Formerly trained in the Sagrado Corazón Handball Club located in Florencio Varela, Buenos Aires.
