= Nahomi Márquez =

Cuban handball player (born 2000)

Personal information
- Full name: Nahomi Márquez Jabique
- Born: 20 September 2000 (age 26) Havana, Cuba
- Height: 1.83 m (6 ft 0 in)

Sport
- Sport: Handball
- Position: Left wing
- Current club: Pallamano Trieste
- Number: 24
National team
Years	Team	Apps	(Gls)
–	Cuba	27	(21)
Medal record
Pan American Games
Bronze medal – third place	2019 Lima	Team
Central American and Caribbean Games
Bronze medal – third place	2018 Barranquilla	Team

Nahomi Márquez Jabique (born 20 September 2000) is a Cuban handball player for Pallamano Trieste and the Cuban national team.

She represented Cuba at the 2019 World Women's Handball Championship.
