= Yarumy Céspedes =

Cuban handball player (born 1996)

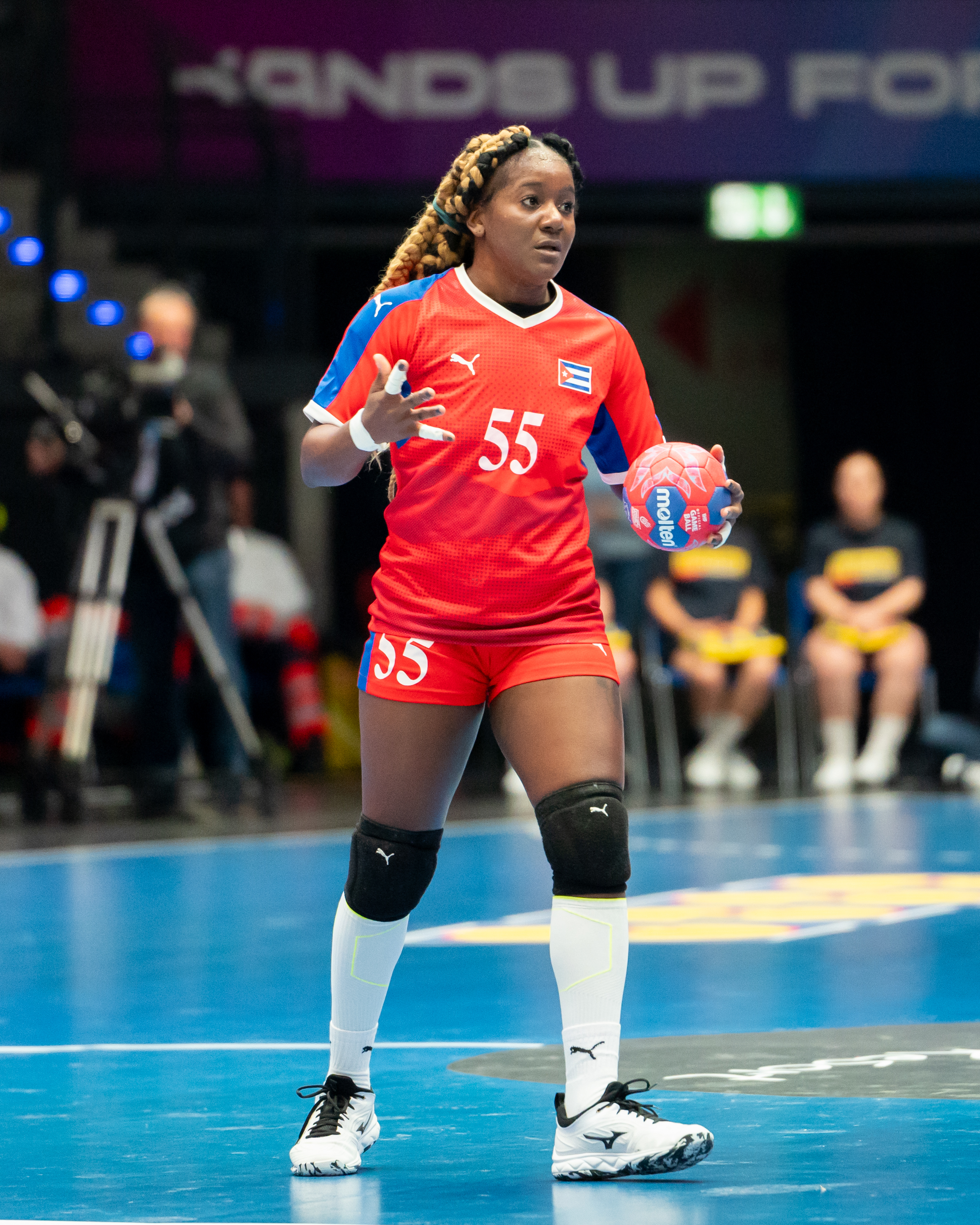

Personal information
- Full name: Yarumy Céspedes Chirino
- Nationality: Cuban
- Born: 2 January 1996 (age 30)
- Height: 1.70 m (5 ft 7 in)

Sport
- Sport: Handball
- Position: Centre back

Senior clubs
- Years: Team
- –: Matanzas
- –: CB T-Maravilla
National team
| Years | Team | Apps | (Gls) |
| – | Cuba | 28 | (45) |
Medal record
Pan American Games
| Bronze medal – third place | 2019 Lima | Team |
Central American and Caribbean Games
| Gold medal – first place | 2023 San Salvador | Team |
| Bronze medal – third place | 2018 Barranquilla | Team |
- Updated on 27 November 2025

Yarumy Céspedes Chirino (born 2 January 1996) is a Cuban handball player for CB T-Maravilla and the Cuban national team.

She represented Cuba at the 2019 World Women's Handball Championship. She also represented them at the 2025 World Women's Handball Championship.
