= Indiana Cedeño =

Cuban handball player (born 1997)

Personal information
- Full name: Indiana Cedeño Ramos
- Nationality: Cuban
- Born: 29 July 1997 (age 29)
- Height: 1.72 m (5 ft 8 in)

Sport
- Sport: Handball
- Position: Goalkeeper
- Current club: Santiago de Cuba
National team
Years	Team	Apps	(Gls)
–	Cuba	29	(0)
Medal record
Pan American Games
Bronze medal – third place	2019 Lima	Team
Central American and Caribbean Games
Bronze medal – third place	2018 Barranquilla	Team

Indiana Cedeño Ramos (born 29 July 1997) is a Cuban handball player for Santiago de Cuba and the Cuban national team.

She represented Cuba at the 2019 World Women's Handball Championship.
