= Camila Bonazzola =

Argentine handball player

Personal information
- Nationality: Argentine
- Born: 21 May 1996 (age 30)
- Height: 1.71 m (5 ft 7 in)

Sport
- Sport: Handball
- Position: Right wing
- Current club: Vi.Lo

Senior clubs
- Years: Team
- –2018: Vi.Lo
- 2018–2019: Liberbank Gijón
- 2019–: Vi.Lo
National team
Years	Team	Apps	(Gls)
–	Argentina	54	(115)
Medal record
Pan American Games
Silver medal – second place	2019 Lima	Team
Pan American Championship
Silver medal – second place	2017 Argentina
South and Central American Championship
Silver medal – second place	2018 Brazil
South American Games
Silver medal – second place	2018 Cochabamba	Team
Pan American Junior Championship
Silver medal – second place	2016 Brazil

Camila Bonazzola (born 21 May 1996) is an Argentine handball player for Vi.Lo and the Argentine national team.

She was selected to represent Argentina at the 2017 World Women's Handball Championship.
