= Handball at the 2023 Central American and Caribbean Games =

- Venue: Multigimnasio Don Bosco
- Location: Soyapango
- Dates: 24 June – 7 July 2023
- Competitors: 224

Handball competition at the 2023 Central American and Caribbean Games are scheduled to be held from 24 June to 7 July 2023. The venue for the competition is the Multigimnasio Don Bosco located in Soyapango.

A total of eight men's and eight women's teams (each consisting up to 14 athletes) will compete in each tournament. This means a total of 224 athletes are scheduled to compete.

The winner and runner-up of each competition will qualify for the 2023 Pan American Games in Santiago, Chile. The third place teams will play against the third-placed teams of the 2022 South American Games playoffs.

== Qualification ==
Eight men's teams and eight women's teams will qualify to compete at the games in each tournament. The host nation (El Salvador) received automatic qualification in both tournaments, along with seven other teams. For both genders five places for Caribbean were planned bot only four teams per gender participated at the Caribbean Handball Cup. Therefor one spot is still not awarded. Central America has two spots per gender.

=== Men ===
Event	Dates	Location	Vacancies	Qualified
Host nation	—N/a	—N/a	1	El Salvador
2023 Caribbean Handball Cup	3 – 9 October 2022	(Dominican Republic) Santo Domingo	4	Cuba; Dominican Republic; Mexico; Puerto Rico
2023 Central American Championship	21 – 25 February 2023	(Nicaragua) Managua	2	Costa Rica; Nicaragua
Wild card			1	Venezuela
Total			8	

=== Women ===
Event	Dates	Location	Vacancies	Qualified
Host nation	—N/a	—N/a	1	El Salvador
2023 Caribbean Handball Cup	2 – 8 October 2022	(Dominican Republic) Santo Domingo	4	Cuba; Dominican Republic; Mexico; Puerto Rico
2023 Central American Championship	28 February – 4 March 2023	(Nicaragua) Managua	2	Costa Rica; Nicaragua
Wild card			1	Colombia
Total			8	

== Participating nations ==
The following countries qualified handball teams. The numbers of participants qualified are in parentheses.

- Colombia (14)
- Costa Rica (28)
- Cuba (28)
- Dominican Republic (28)
- El Salvador (28) (host)
- Mexico (28)
- Nicaragua (28)
- Puerto Rico (28)
- Venezuela (14)

== Medal summary ==
=== Medal table ===
* Host nation (El Salvador)

Rank	Nation	Gold	Silver	Bronze	Total
1	Cuba (CUB)	2	0	0	2
2	Dominican Republic (DOM)	0	1	1	2
3	Puerto Rico (PUR)	0	1	0	1
4	Mexico (MEX)	0	0	1	1
Totals (4 entries)		2	2	2	6

=== Medalists ===
Event	Gold	Silver	Bronze
Men's tournament	Cuba; Mario Perez; Jorge Pren; Daril Gonzalez; Ronaldo Almeida; Lidier Vergara; Edmanuel Diaz; Christopher Martinez; Mario Sainz; Frank Cordies; Magnol Suarez; Adonis Garcia; Omar Toledano; Dariel Garcia; Hanser Rodriguez	Dominican Republic; Adonis Gonzalez; Alionky Mota; Dioris Mateo; Erick Montero; Francis De La Cruz; Franklin Fernandez; Heriberto Merino; Jorge Soto; Julio Alcantara; Luiggy Lopez; Luis Alfredo; Luis Angel; Maykol Beras; Willibert De La Rosa	Mexico; Luis Avalos; Ricardo Zarco; Sayyed Morales; Luis Ortiz; Hector Perez; Sergio Sanchez; Jesus Ramirez; Jesus Rivera; Fernando Rodriguez; Benito Hernandez; Francisco Muniz; Jesus Sandoval; Jesus Loya; Daniel Marquez
Women's tournament	Cuba; Niurkis Mora; Dianny González; Maria Veranes; Gleinys Reyes; Diancy González; Nahomis Mustelier; Odalys Escalona; Danielys Herranz; Angela Amoros; Yamileidis Alcantara; Yennifer Toledo; Yarumy Céspedes; Rosa Leal; Melissa chala	Puerto Rico; Kitsa Escobar; Adriana Cabrera; Nathalys Ceballos; Sheila Hiraldo; Jackeline Gonzalez; Joane Vergara; Alanis Benitez; Roxanaly Carrasquillo; Erika Graciani; Ciris García; Zuleika Fuentes; Lizabeth Rodriguez; Robeliz Ortiz; Ashanti Calderon	Dominican Republic; Yojaver Brito; Crisleidy Hernández; Mabelin Wattley; Annerys Cabrera; Johanna Pimentel; Nancy Peña; Mariela Andino; Carina Lorenzo; Florquidia Puello; Suleidy Suárez; Carolina López; Débora Torreira; Diandra Pie; Yacaira Tejeda

== Women's tournament ==
=== Preliminary round ===
==== Group A ====
Pos	Team	Pld	W	D	L	GF	GA	GD	Pts	Qualification
1	Dominican Republic	3	3	0	0	92	65	+27	6	Semi final
2	Mexico	3	2	0	1	102	62	+40	4	Semi final
3	Costa Rica	3	1	0	2	67	75	−8	2	
4	El Salvador (H)	3	0	0	3	49	108	−59	0	

Rules for classification: 1) points; 2) head-to-head points; 3) head-to-head goal difference; 4) head-to-head number of goals scored; 5) goal difference.
(H) Hosts

All times are local (UTC−06:00).

24 June 2023; 15:00	Mexico	31–19	Costa Rica	Multi Gimnasio Don Bosco, Soyapango; Referees: Reyes, Zuñiga (CUB)
24 June 2023; 15:00	Govea 6	(13–8)	Araya 4	Multi Gimnasio Don Bosco, Soyapango; Referees: Reyes, Zuñiga (CUB)
24 June 2023; 15:00	4× (suspension)	Report	5× (suspension)	Multi Gimnasio Don Bosco, Soyapango; Referees: Reyes, Zuñiga (CUB)

24 June 2023; 19:00	Dominican Republic	31–23	El Salvador	Multi Gimnasio Don Bosco, Soyapango; Referees: Estrada, Pineda (COL)
24 June 2023; 19:00	Peña 7	(15–14)	Muñoz, Reyes 6	Multi Gimnasio Don Bosco, Soyapango; Referees: Estrada, Pineda (COL)
24 June 2023; 19:00	2× (suspension) 1× (red card)	Report	2× (suspension)	Multi Gimnasio Don Bosco, Soyapango; Referees: Estrada, Pineda (COL)

25 June 2023; 13:00	Dominican Republic	31–14	Costa Rica	Multi Gimnasio Don Bosco, Soyapango; Referees: Estrada, Pineda (COL)
25 June 2023; 13:00	Peña 8	(15–6)	Calvo 4	Multi Gimnasio Don Bosco, Soyapango; Referees: Estrada, Pineda (COL)
25 June 2023; 13:00	5× (suspension)	Report	6× (suspension)	Multi Gimnasio Don Bosco, Soyapango; Referees: Estrada, Pineda (COL)

25 June 2023; 19:00	Mexico	43–13	El Salvador	Multi Gimnasio Don Bosco, Soyapango; Referees: Reyes, Zuñiga (CUB)
25 June 2023; 19:00	Govea 6	(22–2)	Muñoz, Sandoval 3	Multi Gimnasio Don Bosco, Soyapango; Referees: Reyes, Zuñiga (CUB)
25 June 2023; 19:00	2× (suspension)	Report	3× (suspension)	Multi Gimnasio Don Bosco, Soyapango; Referees: Reyes, Zuñiga (CUB)

26 June 2023; 15:00	Dominican Republic	30–28	Mexico	Multi Gimnasio Don Bosco, Soyapango; Referees: Conberse, Correa (ARG)
26 June 2023; 15:00	Hernandez, Puello 6	(14–14)	Leal, Jaramillo 4	Multi Gimnasio Don Bosco, Soyapango; Referees: Conberse, Correa (ARG)
26 June 2023; 15:00	1× (yellow card) 3× (suspension)	Report	5× (suspension)	Multi Gimnasio Don Bosco, Soyapango; Referees: Conberse, Correa (ARG)

26 June 2023; 19:00	El Salvador	13–34	Costa Rica	Multi Gimnasio Don Bosco, Soyapango; Referees: Agramonte, De Jesus (DOM)
26 June 2023; 19:00	Muñoz 3	(4–17)	Araya 11	Multi Gimnasio Don Bosco, Soyapango; Referees: Agramonte, De Jesus (DOM)
26 June 2023; 19:00	1× (suspension)	Report	2× (suspension) 1× (red card)	Multi Gimnasio Don Bosco, Soyapango; Referees: Agramonte, De Jesus (DOM)

==== Group B ====
Pos	Team	Pld	W	D	L	GF	GA	GD	Pts	Qualification
1	Puerto Rico	3	3	0	0	120	78	+42	6	Semi final
2	Cuba	3	2	0	1	111	67	+44	4	Semi final
3	Colombia	3	1	0	2	82	101	−19	2	
4	Nicaragua	3	0	0	3	67	134	−67	0	

Rules for classification: 1) points; 2) head-to-head points; 3) head-to-head goal difference; 4) head-to-head number of goals scored; 5) goal difference.

24 June 2023; 13:00	Puerto Rico	34–25	Colombia	Multi Gimnasio Don Bosco, Soyapango; Referees: Conberse, Correa (ARG)
24 June 2023; 13:00	Three players 5	(18–9)	Arcila 6	Multi Gimnasio Don Bosco, Soyapango; Referees: Conberse, Correa (ARG)
24 June 2023; 13:00	1× (yellow card) 2× (suspension)	Report	1× (yellow card) 3× (suspension)	Multi Gimnasio Don Bosco, Soyapango; Referees: Conberse, Correa (ARG)

24 June 2023; 17:00	Cuba	46–12	Nicaragua	Multi Gimnasio Don Bosco, Soyapango; Referees: Belmonte, Coba (MEX)
24 June 2023; 17:00	Veranes 10	(22–6)	Tercero 3	Multi Gimnasio Don Bosco, Soyapango; Referees: Belmonte, Coba (MEX)
24 June 2023; 17:00	3× (suspension) 1× (red card)	Report	2× (suspension)	Multi Gimnasio Don Bosco, Soyapango; Referees: Belmonte, Coba (MEX)

25 June 2023; 15:00	Cuba	37–20	Colombia	Multi Gimnasio Don Bosco, Soyapango; Referees: Belmonte, Coba (CUB)
25 June 2023; 15:00	González, Mustelier 6	(14–11)	Vargas 4	Multi Gimnasio Don Bosco, Soyapango; Referees: Belmonte, Coba (CUB)
25 June 2023; 15:00	2× (suspension)	Report	1× (yellow card) 2× (suspension)	Multi Gimnasio Don Bosco, Soyapango; Referees: Belmonte, Coba (CUB)

25 June 2023; 17:00	Puerto Rico	51–25	Nicaragua	Multi Gimnasio Don Bosco, Soyapango; Referees: Agramonte, De Jesus (DOM)
25 June 2023; 17:00	Fuentes 13	(24–10)	Ortega, Gutiérrez 5	Multi Gimnasio Don Bosco, Soyapango; Referees: Agramonte, De Jesus (DOM)
25 June 2023; 17:00	4× (suspension)	Report	2× (suspension)	Multi Gimnasio Don Bosco, Soyapango; Referees: Agramonte, De Jesus (DOM)

26 June 2023; 13:00	Colombia	37–30	Nicaragua	Multi Gimnasio Don Bosco, Soyapango; Referees: Ramos, Sosa (ESA)
26 June 2023; 13:00	Arcila 10	(20–16)	Ortega 7	Multi Gimnasio Don Bosco, Soyapango; Referees: Ramos, Sosa (ESA)
26 June 2023; 13:00	3× (suspension)	Report	1× (yellow card) 3× (suspension)	Multi Gimnasio Don Bosco, Soyapango; Referees: Ramos, Sosa (ESA)

26 June 2023; 17:00	Puerto Rico	35–28	Cuba	Multi Gimnasio Don Bosco, Soyapango; Referees: Estrada, Pineda (COL)
26 June 2023; 17:00	Fuentes 8	(21–13)	Veranes 7	Multi Gimnasio Don Bosco, Soyapango; Referees: Estrada, Pineda (COL)
26 June 2023; 17:00	2× (yellow card) 6× (suspension)	Report	3× (suspension) 1× (red card)	Multi Gimnasio Don Bosco, Soyapango; Referees: Estrada, Pineda (COL)

=== Knockout stage ===
==== Bracket ====
Semifinals
28 June
Puerto Rico	26
Mexico	25
28 June
Dominican Republic	27
Cuba	33

Gold medal
29 June
Puerto Rico	28
Cuba	29
Bronze medal
29 June
Mexico	27
Dominican Republic	29

5–8th place semifinals
28 June
Colombia	39
El Salvador	19
28 June
Costa Rica	28
Nicaragua	29

Fifth place
29 June
Colombia	44
Nicaragua	29
Seventh place
29 June
El Salvador	13
Costa Rica	29

==== Semifinals ====
28 June 2023; 17:00	Puerto Rico	26–25	Mexico	Multi Gimnasio Don Bosco, Soyapango; Referees: Estrada, Pineda (COL)
28 June 2023; 17:00	Ceballos 9	(13–12)	Leal 9	Multi Gimnasio Don Bosco, Soyapango; Referees: Estrada, Pineda (COL)
28 June 2023; 17:00	2× (yellow card) 5× (suspension)	Report	4× (suspension) 1× (red card)	Multi Gimnasio Don Bosco, Soyapango; Referees: Estrada, Pineda (COL)

28 June 2023; 19:30	Dominican Republic	27–33	Cuba	Multi Gimnasio Don Bosco, Soyapango; Referees: Conberse, Correa (ARG)
28 June 2023; 19:30	Brito 9	(10–19)	Reyes 12	Multi Gimnasio Don Bosco, Soyapango; Referees: Conberse, Correa (ARG)
28 June 2023; 19:30	3× (suspension)	Report	2× (yellow card) 6× (suspension)	Multi Gimnasio Don Bosco, Soyapango; Referees: Conberse, Correa (ARG)

==== 5th to 8th semifinals ====
28 June 2023; 12:00	Colombia	39–19	El Salvador	Multi Gimnasio Don Bosco, Soyapango; Referees: Agramonte, De Jesus (DOM)
28 June 2023; 12:00	Castaño 9	(20–11)	Sandoval 7	Multi Gimnasio Don Bosco, Soyapango; Referees: Agramonte, De Jesus (DOM)
28 June 2023; 12:00	3× (suspension)	Report	5× (suspension)	Multi Gimnasio Don Bosco, Soyapango; Referees: Agramonte, De Jesus (DOM)

28 June 2023; 14:30	Costa Rica	28–29	Nicaragua	Multi Gimnasio Don Bosco, Soyapango; Referees: Belmonte, Coba (MEX)
28 June 2023; 14:30	Corrales 8	(15–13)	Terceiro 7	Multi Gimnasio Don Bosco, Soyapango; Referees: Belmonte, Coba (MEX)
28 June 2023; 14:30	5× (suspension) 1× (red card)	Report	1× (yellow card) 4× (suspension)	Multi Gimnasio Don Bosco, Soyapango; Referees: Belmonte, Coba (MEX)

==== Gold medal ====
29 June 2023; 19:30	Puerto Rico	28–29	Cuba	Multi Gimnasio Don Bosco, Soyapango; Referees: Conberse, Correa (ARG)
29 June 2023; 19:30	Hiraldo 7	(14–12)	Reyes 15	Multi Gimnasio Don Bosco, Soyapango; Referees: Conberse, Correa (ARG)
29 June 2023; 19:30	5× (suspension) 1× (red card)	Report	1× (yellow card) 8× (suspension)	Multi Gimnasio Don Bosco, Soyapango; Referees: Conberse, Correa (ARG)

==== Bronze medal ====
29 June 2023; 17:00	Mexico	27–29	Dominican Republic	Multi Gimnasio Don Bosco, Soyapango; Referees: Reyes, Zuñiga (CUB)
29 June 2023; 17:00	Leal 6	(15–14)	Peña, Andino 6	Multi Gimnasio Don Bosco, Soyapango; Referees: Reyes, Zuñiga (CUB)
29 June 2023; 17:00	1× (yellow card) 5× (suspension)	Report	3× (suspension)	Multi Gimnasio Don Bosco, Soyapango; Referees: Reyes, Zuñiga (CUB)

==== 5th place ====
29 June 2023; 14:30	Colombia	44–29	Nicaragua	Multi Gimnasio Don Bosco, Soyapango; Referees: Belmonte, Coba (MEX)
29 June 2023; 14:30	Arcila 11	(21–15)	Cardenas 9	Multi Gimnasio Don Bosco, Soyapango; Referees: Belmonte, Coba (MEX)
29 June 2023; 14:30	4× (suspension)	Report	1× (suspension)	Multi Gimnasio Don Bosco, Soyapango; Referees: Belmonte, Coba (MEX)

==== 7th place ====
29 June 2023; 12:00	El Salvador	13–29	Costa Rica	Multi Gimnasio Don Bosco, Soyapango; Referees: Agramonte, De Jesus (DOM)
29 June 2023; 12:00	Zavala 4	(3–17)	Loaiza 6	Multi Gimnasio Don Bosco, Soyapango; Referees: Agramonte, De Jesus (DOM)
29 June 2023; 12:00	3× (suspension)	Report	2× (suspension) 1× (red card)	Multi Gimnasio Don Bosco, Soyapango; Referees: Agramonte, De Jesus (DOM)

=== Final standings ===
Rank	Team
Gold medal	Cuba
Silver medal	Puerto Rico
Bronze medal	Dominican Republic
4	Mexico
5	Colombia
6	Nicaragua
7	Costa Rica
8	El Salvador

Qualified for the 2023 Pan American Games
Qualified for the Last chance qualification tournament for the 2023 Pan American Games

== Men's tournament ==
=== Preliminary round ===
==== Group A ====
Pos	Team	Pld	W	D	L	GF	GA	GD	Pts	Qualification
1	Mexico	3	3	0	0	123	74	+49	6	Semi final
2	Puerto Rico	3	2	0	1	114	83	+31	4	Semi final
3	Nicaragua	3	1	0	2	91	117	−26	2	
4	El Salvador (H)	3	0	0	3	63	112	−49	0	

Source: Summary
Rules for classification: 1) points; 2) head-to-head points; 3) head-to-head goal difference; 4) head-to-head number of goals scored; 5) goal difference.
(H) Hosts

All times are local (UTC−06:00).

2 July 2023; 15:00	Mexico	50–27	Nicaragua	Multi Gimnasio Don Bosco, Soyapango; Referees: Agramonte, De Jesus (DOM)
2 July 2023; 15:00	Perez 8	(26–16)	Gonzalez 7	Multi Gimnasio Don Bosco, Soyapango; Referees: Agramonte, De Jesus (DOM)
2 July 2023; 15:00	1× (suspension)	Report	2× (suspension)	Multi Gimnasio Don Bosco, Soyapango; Referees: Agramonte, De Jesus (DOM)

2 July 2023; 19:00	Puerto Rico	40–18	El Salvador	Multi Gimnasio Don Bosco, Soyapango; Referees: Estrada, Pineda (COL)
2 July 2023; 19:00	Ceballos 8	(21–11)	Escalante 5	Multi Gimnasio Don Bosco, Soyapango; Referees: Estrada, Pineda (COL)
2 July 2023; 19:00	2× (yellow card) 3× (suspension) 1× (red card)	Report	2× (suspension)	Multi Gimnasio Don Bosco, Soyapango; Referees: Estrada, Pineda (COL)

3 July 2023; 13:00	Puerto Rico	45–29	Nicaragua	Multi Gimnasio Don Bosco, Soyapango; Referees: Belmonte, Coba (MEX)
3 July 2023; 13:00	Monge 9	(21–15)	Garay 8	Multi Gimnasio Don Bosco, Soyapango; Referees: Belmonte, Coba (MEX)
3 July 2023; 13:00	1× (yellow card) 1× (suspension)	Report	7× (suspension) 1× (red card)	Multi Gimnasio Don Bosco, Soyapango; Referees: Belmonte, Coba (MEX)

3 July 2023; 19:00	Mexico	37–18	El Salvador	Multi Gimnasio Don Bosco, Soyapango; Referees: Agramonte, De Jesus (DOM)
3 July 2023; 19:00	Sanchez 7	(21–7)	A. Hernandez 7	Multi Gimnasio Don Bosco, Soyapango; Referees: Agramonte, De Jesus (DOM)
3 July 2023; 19:00	3× (yellow card) 3× (suspension)	Report	1× (yellow card) 1× (suspension) 1× (red card)	Multi Gimnasio Don Bosco, Soyapango; Referees: Agramonte, De Jesus (DOM)

4 July 2023; 15:00	Puerto Rico	29–36	Mexico	Multi Gimnasio Don Bosco, Soyapango; Referees: Reyes, Zuñiga (CUB)
4 July 2023; 15:00	Ramos 5	(16–17)	Rodriguez 9	Multi Gimnasio Don Bosco, Soyapango; Referees: Reyes, Zuñiga (CUB)
4 July 2023; 15:00	2× (suspension) 1× (red card)	Report	2× (suspension)	Multi Gimnasio Don Bosco, Soyapango; Referees: Reyes, Zuñiga (CUB)

4 July 2023; 19:00	El Salvador	27–35	Nicaragua	Multi Gimnasio Don Bosco, Soyapango; Referees: Belmonte, Coba (MEX)
4 July 2023; 19:00	Hernandez 13	(15–14)	Gonzalez 12	Multi Gimnasio Don Bosco, Soyapango; Referees: Belmonte, Coba (MEX)
4 July 2023; 19:00	1× (yellow card) 4× (suspension)	Report	5× (suspension)	Multi Gimnasio Don Bosco, Soyapango; Referees: Belmonte, Coba (MEX)

==== Group B ====
Pos	Team	Pld	W	D	L	GF	GA	GD	Pts	Qualification
1	Cuba	3	3	0	0	98	62	+36	6	Semi final
2	Dominican Republic	3	2	0	1	85	76	+9	4	Semi final
3	Venezuela	3	0	1	2	78	97	−19	1	
4	Costa Rica	3	0	1	2	74	100	−26	1	

Source: Summary
Rules for classification: 1) points; 2) head-to-head points; 3) head-to-head goal difference; 4) head-to-head number of goals scored; 5) goal difference.

2 July 2023; 13:00	Cuba	30–20	Venezuela	Multi Gimnasio Don Bosco, Soyapango; Referees: Belmonre, Coba (MEX)
2 July 2023; 13:00	Almeida 7	(9–9)	Noel 5	Multi Gimnasio Don Bosco, Soyapango; Referees: Belmonre, Coba (MEX)
2 July 2023; 13:00	3× (suspension)	Report	2× (suspension)	Multi Gimnasio Don Bosco, Soyapango; Referees: Belmonre, Coba (MEX)

2 July 2023; 17:00	Dominican Republic	28–22	Costa Rica	Multi Gimnasio Don Bosco, Soyapango; Referees: Reyes, Zuñiga (CUB)
2 July 2023; 17:00	Soto 6	(14–7)	Jimenez 6	Multi Gimnasio Don Bosco, Soyapango; Referees: Reyes, Zuñiga (CUB)
2 July 2023; 17:00	4× (suspension) 1× (red card)	Report	2× (suspension)	Multi Gimnasio Don Bosco, Soyapango; Referees: Reyes, Zuñiga (CUB)

3 July 2023; 15:00	Dominican Republic	35–26	Venezuela	Multi Gimnasio Don Bosco, Soyapango; Referees: Estrada, Pineda (COL)
3 July 2023; 15:00	Beras 10	(17–10)	Peñaloza 9	Multi Gimnasio Don Bosco, Soyapango; Referees: Estrada, Pineda (COL)
3 July 2023; 15:00	5× (suspension)	Report	4× (suspension) 1× (red card)	Multi Gimnasio Don Bosco, Soyapango; Referees: Estrada, Pineda (COL)

3 July 2023; 17:00	Cuba	40–20	Costa Rica	Multi Gimnasio Don Bosco, Soyapango; Referees: Conberse, Correa (ARG)
3 July 2023; 17:00	Pérez 7	(20–11)	Jimenez 4	Multi Gimnasio Don Bosco, Soyapango; Referees: Conberse, Correa (ARG)
3 July 2023; 17:00	2× (yellow card) 3× (suspension)	Report	3× (suspension)	Multi Gimnasio Don Bosco, Soyapango; Referees: Conberse, Correa (ARG)

4 July 2023; 13:00	Venezuela	32–32	Costa Rica	Multi Gimnasio Don Bosco, Soyapango; Referees: Conberse, Correa (ARG)
4 July 2023; 13:00	Noel 6	(19–13)	Molina 6 Montoya 6	Multi Gimnasio Don Bosco, Soyapango; Referees: Conberse, Correa (ARG)
4 July 2023; 13:00	7× (suspension) 1× (red card)	Report	1× (yellow card) 3× (suspension)	Multi Gimnasio Don Bosco, Soyapango; Referees: Conberse, Correa (ARG)

4 July 2023; 17:00	Cuba	28–22	Dominican Republic	Multi Gimnasio Don Bosco, Soyapango; Referees: Estrada, Pineda (COL)
4 July 2023; 17:00	Almeida 8	(14–16)	Beras 5	Multi Gimnasio Don Bosco, Soyapango; Referees: Estrada, Pineda (COL)
4 July 2023; 17:00	1× (yellow card) 2× (suspension)	Report	7× (suspension) 1× (red card)	Multi Gimnasio Don Bosco, Soyapango; Referees: Estrada, Pineda (COL)

=== Knockout stage ===
==== Bracket ====
Semifinals
6 July
Mexico	20
Dominican Republic	26
6 July
Puerto Rico	18
Cuba	24

Gold medal
7 July
Dominican Republic	29
Cuba	30
Bronze medal
7 July
Mexico	32
Puerto Rico	29

5–8th place semifinals
6 July
Nicaragua	29
Costa Rica	34
6 July
El Salvador	27
Venezuela	38

Fifth place
7 July
Costa Rica	29
Venezuela	32
Seventh place
7 July
Nicaragua	37
El Salvador	33

==== Semifinals ====
6 July 2023; 17:00	Mexico	20–26	Dominican Republic	Multi Gimnasio Don Bosco, Soyapango; Referees: Conberse, Correa (ARG)
6 July 2023; 17:00	Sanchez 7	(8–11)	de la Cruz 8	Multi Gimnasio Don Bosco, Soyapango; Referees: Conberse, Correa (ARG)
6 July 2023; 17:00	1× (yellow card) 1× (suspension) 1× (red card)	Report	1× (yellow card) 2× (suspension) 1× (red card)	Multi Gimnasio Don Bosco, Soyapango; Referees: Conberse, Correa (ARG)

6 July 2023; 19:30	Cuba	24–18	Puerto Rico	Multi Gimnasio Don Bosco, Soyapango; Referees: Estrada, Pineda (COL)
6 July 2023; 19:30	García 7	(9–9)	Monge 6	Multi Gimnasio Don Bosco, Soyapango; Referees: Estrada, Pineda (COL)
6 July 2023; 19:30	1× (yellow card) 3× (suspension)	Report	1× (suspension) 1× (red card)	Multi Gimnasio Don Bosco, Soyapango; Referees: Estrada, Pineda (COL)

==== 5th to 8th semifinals ====
6 July 2023; 12:00	Nicaragua	29–34	Costa Rica	Multi Gimnasio Don Bosco, Soyapango; Referees: Ramos, Martinez (ESA)
6 July 2023; 12:00	Gonzalez 7	(15–10)	Marchena 7	Multi Gimnasio Don Bosco, Soyapango; Referees: Ramos, Martinez (ESA)
6 July 2023; 12:00	1× (yellow card) 4× (suspension)	Report	4× (suspension)	Multi Gimnasio Don Bosco, Soyapango; Referees: Ramos, Martinez (ESA)

6 July 2023; 20:00	Venezuela	38–27	El Salvador	Multi Gimnasio Don Bosco, Soyapango; Referees: Agramonte, De Jesus (DOM)
6 July 2023; 20:00	Noel 9	(18–12)	Espinoza 7	Multi Gimnasio Don Bosco, Soyapango; Referees: Agramonte, De Jesus (DOM)
6 July 2023; 20:00	4× (suspension)	Report	3× (suspension)	Multi Gimnasio Don Bosco, Soyapango; Referees: Agramonte, De Jesus (DOM)

==== Gold medal ====
7 July 2023; 19:30	Cuba	30–29	Dominican Republic	Multi Gimnasio Don Bosco, Soyapango; Referees: Conberse, Correa (ARG)
7 July 2023; 19:30	Toledano 8	(14–10)	Soto 8	Multi Gimnasio Don Bosco, Soyapango; Referees: Conberse, Correa (ARG)
7 July 2023; 19:30	2× (yellow card) 7× (suspension) 2× (red card)	Report	1× (yellow card) 6× (suspension)	Multi Gimnasio Don Bosco, Soyapango; Referees: Conberse, Correa (ARG)

==== Bronze medal ====
7 July 2023; 17:00	Puerto Rico	29–32	Mexico	Referees: Reyes, Zuñiga (CUB)
7 July 2023; 17:00	Gonzalez 7	(14–15)	Morales, Perez 7	Referees: Reyes, Zuñiga (CUB)
7 July 2023; 17:00	2× (suspension)	Report	5× (suspension) 1× (red card)	Referees: Reyes, Zuñiga (CUB)

==== 5th place ====
7 July 2023; 14:30	Venezuela	32–29	Costa Rica	Referees: Belmonte, Coba (MEX)
7 July 2023; 14:30	Seijas 6	(19–13)	Montoya 8	Referees: Belmonte, Coba (MEX)
7 July 2023; 14:30	3× (suspension)	Report	1× (yellow card) 3× (suspension)	Referees: Belmonte, Coba (MEX)

==== 7th place ====
7 July 2023; 12:00	El Salvador	33–37	Nicaragua	Referees: Agramonte, De Jesus (DOM)
7 July 2023; 12:00	Escalante, Hernandez 7	(18–21)	Garay, Cano 7	Referees: Agramonte, De Jesus (DOM)
7 July 2023; 12:00	3× (suspension)	Report	4× (suspension)	Referees: Agramonte, De Jesus (DOM)

=== Final standings ===
Rank	Team
Gold medal	Cuba
Silver medal	Dominican Republic
Bronze medal	Mexico
4	Puerto Rico
5	Venezuela
6	Costa Rica
7	Nicaragua
8	El Salvador

Qualified for the 2023 Pan American Games
Qualified for the Last chance qualification tournament for the 2023 Pan American Games
