= Handball at the Central American and Caribbean Games =

Handball has been a Central American and Caribbean Games event since 1993 in Ponce, Puerto Rico. In addition to crowning the handball champions of the Central American and Caribbean Games, the tournament also serves as a qualifying tournament for the Pan American Games.

== Men ==
=== Summary ===
Year	Host	Final			Third place match		
Year	Host	Champion	Score	Runner-up	Third place	Score	Fourth place
1993; Details	(Puerto Rico); Ponce	Cuba	29–14	Mexico	Puerto Rico	25–21	Guatemala
2002; Details	(El Salvador); San Salvador	Dominican Republic	34–32	Puerto Rico	Mexico	32–20	Guatemala
2006; Details	(Dominican Republic); Santo Domingo	Dominican Republic	32–28	Cuba	Mexico	33–28	Puerto Rico
2010; Details	(Puerto Rico); Mayaguez	Dominican Republic	40–28	Venezuela	Mexico	30–24	Puerto Rico
2014; Details	(Mexico); Veracruz	Puerto Rico	37–27	Dominican Republic	Cuba	32–22	Mexico
2018; Details	(Colombia); Barranquilla	Cuba	29–18	Puerto Rico	Mexico	33–32	Dominican Republic
2023; Details	(El Salvador); San Salvador	Cuba	30–29	Dominican Republic	Mexico	32–29	Puerto Rico

=== Medal table ===
Rank	Nation	Gold	Silver	Bronze	Total
1	Dominican Republic	3	2	0	5
2	Cuba	3	1	1	5
3	Puerto Rico	1	2	1	4
4	Mexico	0	1	5	6
5	Venezuela	0	1	0	1
Totals (5 entries)		7	7	7	21

=== Participating nations ===
Nation	(Puerto Rico) 1993	(El Salvador) 2002	(Dominican Republic) 2006	(Puerto Rico) 2010	(Mexico) 2014	(Colombia) 2018	(El Salvador) 2023	Years
Colombia	-	-	-	-	5th	5th	-	2
Costa Rica	5th	-	-	-	8th	7th	6th	4
Cuba	1st	-	2nd	-	3rd	1st	1st	5
Dominican Republic	-	1st	1st	1st	2nd	4th	2nd	6
El Salvador	-	-	-	7th	-	-	8th	3
Guatemala	4th	4th	6th	5th	6th	6th	–	6
Honduras	-	-	7th	-	-	8th	–	2
Mexico	2nd	3rd	3rd	3rd	4th	3rd	3rd	7
Nicaragua	-	-	-	6th	7th	-	7th	3
Puerto Rico	3rd	2nd	4th	4th	1st	2nd	4th	7
Venezuela	-	-	5th	2nd	-	-	5th	3
Total	5	4	7	7	8	8	8	

== Women ==
=== Summary ===
Year	Host	Final			Third place match		
Year	Host	Champion	Score	Runner-up	Third place	Score	Fourth place
1993; Details	(Puerto Rico); Ponce	Cuba	31–19	Mexico	Costa Rica	15–10	Puerto Rico
2002; Details	(El Salvador); San Salvador	Dominican Republic	26–24	Mexico	Puerto Rico	28–24	Guatemala
2006; Details	(Dominican Republic); Santo Domingo	Cuba	36–24	Dominican Republic	Puerto Rico	23–19	Mexico
2010; Details	(Puerto Rico); Mayaguez	Dominican Republic	27–19	Puerto Rico	Mexico	41–16	Costa Rica
2014; Details	(Mexico); Veracruz	Cuba	32–18	Puerto Rico	Mexico	24–15	Dominican Republic
2018; Details	(Colombia); Barranquilla	Dominican Republic	29–25	Puerto Rico	Cuba	29–21	Mexico
2023; Details	(El Salvador); San Salvador	Cuba	29–28	Puerto Rico	Dominican Republic	29–27	Mexico

=== Medal table ===
Rank	Nation	Gold	Silver	Bronze	Total
1	Cuba	4	0	1	5
2	Dominican Republic	3	1	1	5
3	Puerto Rico	0	4	2	6
4	Mexico	0	2	2	4
5	Costa Rica	0	0	1	1
Totals (5 entries)		7	7	7	21

=== Participating nations ===
Nation	(Puerto Rico) 1993	(El Salvador) 2002	(Dominican Republic) 2006	(Puerto Rico) 2010	(Mexico) 2014	(Colombia) 2018	(El Salvador) 2023	Years
Colombia	-	-	-	-	5th	6th	5th	3
Costa Rica	3rd	5th	-	4th	7th	7th	7th	6
Cuba	1st	-	1st	-	1st	3rd	1st	5
Dominican Republic	-	1st	2nd	1st	4th	1st	3rd	6
El Salvador	-	-	5th	5th	-	-	8th	3
Guatemala	5th	4th	6th	6th	8th	5th	–	6
Mexico	2nd	2nd	4th	3rd	3rd	4th	4th	7
Nicaragua	-	-	-	-	6th	8th	6th	3
Puerto Rico	4th	3rd	3rd	2nd	2nd	2nd	2nd	7
Total	5	5	6	6	8	8	8	
