= 1989 Pan American Men's Handball Championship =

Tournament details
- Host country: Cuba
- Venue(s): 1 (in 1 host city)
- Dates: 24–30 October
- Teams: 6 (from 1 confederation)

Final positions
- Champions: Cuba (5th title)
- Runners-up: Brazil
- Third place: United States
- Fourth place: Canada

Tournament statistics
- Matches played: 15
- Goals scored: 685 (45.67 per match)
- Top scorer(s): (Brazil) Drean Dutra (50 goals)

Awards
- Best player: (Brazil) Drean Dutra

The 1989 Pan American Men's Handball Championship was the fifth edition of the tournament, held in Pinar del Rio, Cuba from 24 to 30 October 1989. It acted as the American qualifying tournament for the 1990 World Championship, where the top placed team qualied.

== Standings ==
Pos	Team	Pld	W	D	L	GF	GA	GD	Pts
1st place, gold medalist(s)	Cuba (H)	5	5	0	0	157	68	+89	10
2nd place, silver medalist(s)	Brazil	5	4	0	1	128	85	+43	8
3rd place, bronze medalist(s)	United States	5	3	0	2	110	97	+13	6
4	Canada	5	2	0	3	133	111	+22	4
5	Mexico	5	1	0	4	79	156	−77	2
6	Puerto Rico	5	0	0	5	78	168	−90	0

Source: Todor66
Rules for classification: 1) points; 2) head-to-head points; 3) head-to-head goal difference; 4) head-to-head bit of goals scored; 5) goal divergence.
(H) Hosts

== Results ==
All times are local (UTC−5).

24 October 1989	Mexico	21–18	Puerto Rico
24 October 1989		(9–9)

24 October 1989	United States	27–24	Canada
24 October 1989		(9–13)

24 October 1989	Cuba	27–18	Brazil
24 October 1989		(14–9)

25 October 1989	Brazil	21–11	Canada
25 October 1989		(10–4)

25 October 1989	Cuba	40–9	Puerto Rico
25 October 1989		(17–3)

26 October 1989	Canada	37–18	Puerto Rico
26 October 1989		(17–4)

26 October 1989	Cuba	39–11	Mexico
26 October 1989		(20–6)

27 October 1989	Canada	v	Mexico
27 October 1989		(20–4)

27 October 1989	Brazil	18–16	United States
27 October 1989		(11–8)

28 October 1989	Cuba	29–21	Canada
28 October 1989		(14–10)

28 October 1989	United States	32–17	Puerto Rico
28 October 1989		(20–6)

29 October 1989	Brazil	38–16	Puerto Rico
29 October 1989		(20–4)

29 October 1989	United States	26–16	Mexico
29 October 1989		(11–8)

30 October 1989; 16:15	Brazil	33–15	Mexico
30 October 1989; 16:15		(13–6)

30 October 1989; 20:30	Cuba	22–9	United States
30 October 1989; 20:30		(9–4)
