= Sabanetas =

Sabanetas may refer to:

- Sabanetas (Ponce) - a barrio in Ponce, Puerto Rico
- Sabanetas (Mayagüez) - a barrio in Mayagüez, Puerto Rico
