= Sabaneta =

Sabaneta may refer to

- Sabaneta, Antioquia, Colombia
- Sabaneta, Dominican Republic
- Sabaneta, Barinas, Venezuela

== See also ==
- Savaneta, Aruba
- Sabanetas (Ponce)
- Sabanetas (Mayagüez)
