= Débora Torreira =

Dominican Republic handball player

Personal information
- Full name: Débora Torreira Ortiz
- Nationality: Dominican, Spanish
- Born: 8 January 1991 (age 35) Santo Domingo, Dominican Republic
- Height: 1.79 m (5 ft 10 in)

Sport
- Sport: Handball
- Position: Left wing
- Current club: Liberbank Gijón
- Number: 14

Senior clubs
- Years: Team
- 2009–2015: BM Gijón
- 2017–2018: BM Morvedre
- 2018–: Liberbank Gijón
National team
- Years: Team
- –: Dominican Republic
Medal record
Pan American Games
Bronze medal – third place	2011 Guadalajara	Team
Central American and Caribbean Games
Bronze medal – third place	2023 San Salvador	Team

Débora Torreira Ortiz (born 8 January 1990) is a Dominican team handball player. She plays for the club Liberbank Gijón, and on the Dominican Republic national team. She competed at the 2013 World Women's Handball Championship in Serbia, where the Dominican Republic placed 23rd. She also holds Spanish citizenship.
