= Nahomis Mustelier =

Cuban handball player (born 2000)

Personal information
- Full name: Nahomis de la Caridad; Mustelier Hernández
- Nationality: Cuban
- Born: 8 September 2000 (age 26)
- Height: 1.67 m (5 ft 6 in)

Sport
- Sport: Handball
- Position: Left back
- Current club: Santiago de Cuba
National team
Years	Team	Apps	(Gls)
–	Cuba	12	(4)
Medal record
Central American and Caribbean Games
Gold medal – first place	2023 San Salvador	Team

Nahomis de la Caridad Mustelier Hernández (born 8 September 2000) is a Cuban handball player for Santiago de Cuba and the Cuban national team.

She represented Cuba at the 2019 World Women's Handball Championship.
