= 1998 Pan American Men's Handball Championship =

Tournament details
- Host country: Cuba
- Venue: 1 (in 1 host city)
- Dates: 22–29 September
- Teams: 9 (from 1 confederation)

Final positions
- Champions: Cuba (8th title)
- Runners-up: Argentina
- Third place: Brazil
- Fourth place: United States

Tournament statistics
- Matches played: 28
- Goals scored: 1,414 (50.5 per match)
- Top scorer: (Cuba) Carlos Pérez (57 goals)

The 1998 Pan American Men's Handball Championship was the eighth edition of the tournament, held in Havana, Cuba from 22 to 29 September 1998. It acted as the American qualifying tournament for the 1999 World Championship, where the top three placed team qualied.

== Preliminary round ==
All times are local (UTC−4).

=== Group A ===
Pos	Team	Pld	W	D	L	GF	GA	GD	Pts	Qualification
1	Cuba (H)	4	4	0	0	171	62	+109	8	Quarterfinals
2	Brazil	4	3	0	1	133	85	+48	6	Quarterfinals
3	Canada	4	2	0	2	88	112	−24	4	Quarterfinals
4	Colombia	4	1	0	3	86	143	−57	2	Quarterfinals
5	Uruguay	4	0	0	4	77	153	−76	0	

Source: Todor66
Rules for classification: 1) points; 2) head-to-head points; 3) head-to-head goal difference; 4) head-to-head number of goals scored; 5) goal difference.
(H) Hosts

22 September 1998; 14:00	Brazil	34–15	Canada
22 September 1998; 14:00		(11–9)

22 September 1998; 20:30	Cuba	54–13	Uruguay
22 September 1998; 20:30		(23–6)

23 September 1998; 18:00	Canada	28–13	Colombia
23 September 1998; 18:00		(7–7)

23 September 1998; 20:30	Cuba	30–22	Brazil
23 September 1998; 20:30		(14–7)

24 September 1998; 18:00	Brazil	32–16	Uruguay
24 September 1998; 18:00		(20–8)

24 September 1998; 20:30	Cuba	45–16	Colombia
24 September 1998; 20:30		(23–7)

25 September 1998; 16:00	Brazil	45–24	Colombia

25 September 1998; 18:00	Canada	34–23	Uruguay
25 September 1998; 18:00		(18–13)

26 September 1998; 14:00	Colombia	33–25	Uruguay

26 September 1998; 20:30	Cuba	42–11	Canada
26 September 1998; 20:30		(24–4)

=== Group B ===
Pos	Team	Pld	W	D	L	GF	GA	GD	Pts	Qualification
1	Argentina	3	3	0	0	84	47	+37	6	Quarterfinals
2	United States	3	2	0	1	69	57	+12	4	Quarterfinals
3	Greenland	3	1	0	2	54	73	−19	2	Quarterfinals
4	Mexico	3	0	0	3	63	93	−30	0	Quarterfinals
5	Puerto Rico (Note: Puerto Rico withdrew because of Hurricane Georges.)	0	0	0	0	0	0	0	0	Withdrawn

Source: Todor66
Rules for classification: 1) points; 2) head-to-head points; 3) head-to-head goal difference; 4) head-to-head number of goals scored; 5) goal difference.
Notes:

22 September 1998; 18:00	United States	28–19	Mexico
22 September 1998; 18:00		(11–9)

23 September 1998; 14:00	Argentina	24–17	United States
23 September 1998; 14:00		(13–8)

23 September 1998; 16:00	Greenland	29–25	Mexico
23 September 1998; 16:00		(13–10)

24 September 1998; 16:00	Argentina	24–11	Greenland
24 September 1998; 16:00		(13–5)

25 September 1998; 20:30	United States	24–14	Greenland

26 September 1998; 18:00	Argentina	36–19	Mexico

== Knockout stage ==
=== Bracket ===
Quarter-finals
Cuba	44
Mexico	13
United States	21
Canada	20
Brazil	40
Greenland	21
Argentina	32
Colombia	12

Semi-finals
Cuba	27
United States	18
Brazil	15
Argentina	20

Final
Cuba	31
Argentina	26
Third place
United States	22
Brazil	27

Fifth place bracket

Semi-finals
Mexico	23
Canada	32
Greenland	31
Colombia	22

Final
Canada	20
Greenland	21
Third place
Mexico	28
Colombia	23

=== Quarterfinals ===
27 September 1998; 15:00	Brazil	40–21	Greenland

27 September 1998; 17:00	United States	21–20	Canada
27 September 1998; 17:00		(8–12)

27 September 1998; 19:00	Argentina	32–12	Colombia

27 September 1998; 21:00	Cuba	44–13	Mexico

=== 5–8th place semifinals ===
28 September 1998; 14:00	Greenland	31–22	Colombia

28 September 1998; 16:00	Canada	32–23	Mexico
28 September 1998; 16:00		(12–12)

=== Semifinals ===
28 September 1998; 18:00	Argentina	20–15	Brazil

28 September 1998; 20:30	Cuba	27–18	United States

=== Seventh place game ===
29 September 1998; 14:00	Mexico	28–23	Colombia

=== Fifth place game ===
29 September 1998; 16:00	Greenland	21–20	Canada
29 September 1998; 16:00		(11–11)

=== Third place game ===
29 September 1998; 18:00	Brazil	27–22	United States
29 September 1998; 18:00		(14–12)

=== Final ===
29 September 1998; 20:30	Cuba	31–26	Argentina
29 September 1998; 20:30		(13–12)

== Final ranking ==
Qualified for the 1999 World Championship

Rank	Team
Gold medal	Cuba
Silver medal	Argentina
Bronze medal	Brazil
4	United States
5	Greenland
6	Canada
7	Mexico
8	Colombia
9	Uruguay
