= 2004 Pan American Men's Handball Championship =

Tournament details
- Host country: Chile
- Venue(s): 1 (in 1 host city)
- Dates: 20–24 July
- Teams: 8 (from 1 confederation)

Final positions
- Champions: Argentina (3rd title)
- Runner-up: Brazil
- Third place: Canada
- Fourth place: Chile

Tournament statistics
- Matches played: 20
- Goals scored: 1,009 (50.45 per match)

The 2004 Pan American Men's Handball Championship was the eleventh edition of the tournament, held in Santiago, Chile from 20 to 24 July 2004. It acted as the American qualifying tournament for the 2005 World Championship, where the top three placed team qualied.

== Preliminary round ==
All times are local (UTC−3).

=== Group A ===
Pos	Team	Pld	W	D	L	GF	GA	GD	Pts	Qualification
1	Brazil	3	3	0	0	94	40	+54	6	Semifinals
2	Canada	3	2	0	1	71	66	+5	4	Semifinals
3	Puerto Rico	3	1	0	2	66	98	−32	2	
4	United States	3	0	0	3	59	86	−27	0	

Source: Todor66
Rules for classification: 1) points; 2) head-to-head points; 3) head-to-head goal difference; 4) head-to-head number of goals scored; 5) goal difference.

20 July 2004; 14:30	Brazil	25–13	Canada
20 July 2004; 14:30		(13–10)

20 July 2004; 20:30	Puerto Rico	29–28	United States

21 July 2004; 16:30	Canada	26–18	United States

21 July 2004; 18:30	Brazil	38–14	Puerto Rico

22 July 2004; 14:30	Canada	32–23	Puerto Rico

22 July 2004; 16:30	Brazil	31–13	United States
22 July 2004; 16:30		(13–8)

=== Group B ===
Pos	Team	Pld	W	D	L	GF	GA	GD	Pts	Qualification
1	Argentina	3	3	0	0	102	48	+54	6	Semifinals
2	Chile (H)	3	2	0	1	80	77	+3	4	Semifinals
3	Greenland	3	0	1	2	67	82	−15	1	
4	Mexico	3	0	1	2	56	98	−42	1	

Source: Todor66
Rules for classification: 1) points; 2) head-to-head points; 3) head-to-head goal difference; 4) head-to-head number of goals scored; 5) goal difference.
(H) Hosts

20 July 2004; 16:30	Argentina	30–17	Greenland

20 July 2004; 18:30	Chile	35–18	Mexico

21 July 2004; 14:30	Argentina	41–16	Mexico

21 July 2004; 20:30	Chile	30–28	Greenland

22 July 2004; 18:30	Greenland	22–22	Mexico

22 July 2004; 20:30	Argentina	31–15	Chile

== Knockout stage ==
=== Bracket ===
Semi-finals
Brazil	32
Chile	8
Argentina	27
Canada	18

Final
Brazil	21
Argentina	24
Third place
Chile	24
Canada	31

Fifth place game

Semi-finals
Puerto Rico	30
Mexico	24
Greenland	27
United States	21

Final
Puerto Rico	28
Greenland	33
Third place
Mexico	29
United States	37

=== 5–8th place semifinals ===
23 July 2004; 14:30	Puerto Rico	30–24	Mexico

23 July 2004; 16:30	Greenland	27–21	United States

=== Semifinals ===
23 July 2004; 18:30	Brazil	32–8	Chile
23 July 2004; 18:30		(15–6)

23 July 2004; 20:30	Argentina	27–18	Canada

=== Seventh place game ===
24 July 2004; 12:00	United States	37–29	Mexico

=== Fifth place game ===
24 July 2004; 14:00	Greenland	33–28	Puerto Rico

=== Third place game ===
24 July 2004; 16:00	Canada	31–24	Chile
24 July 2004; 16:00		(16–11)

=== Final ===
24 July 2004; 18:00	Argentina	24–21	Brazil
24 July 2004; 18:00		(14–11)

== Final ranking ==
Qualified for the 2005 World Championship

Rank	Team
Gold medal	Argentina
Silver medal	Brazil
Bronze medal	Canada
4	Chile
5	Greenland
6	Puerto Rico
7	United States
8	Mexico

=== All-star team ===
All-star team is

- MVP : Bruno Souza, Brazil
- Goalkeeper: Marcão, Brazil
- Left wing: Hélio Justino, Brazil
- Pivot: Gonzalo Carou, Argentina
- Right wing: Federico Besasso, Argentina
- Left back: Bruno Souza, Brazil
- Center back: Matias Lima, Argentina
- Right back: Leonardo Facundo Querín, Argentina

Goalscorer is D. Santiago (Puerto-Rico) with 39 goals.
