= 2022 Caribbean Women's Handball Cup =

Tournament details
- Host country: Dominican Republic
- City: 1
- Venue(s): 1 (in 1 host city)
- Dates: 2 – 9 October
- Teams: 4 (from 1 confederation)

Final positions
- Champions: Cuba (2nd title)
- Runners-up: Dominican Republic
- Third place: Puerto Rico
- Fourth place: Mexico

The 2022 Caribbean Women's Handball Cup took place in Santo Domingo, Dominican Republic, from 2 to 9 October 2022. Columbia and Dominica were also announced as participant but they didn't play any game. It acted as a qualifying tournament for the 2023 Central American and Caribbean Games. The 5 best teams would have received a spot at the 2023 Central American and Caribbean Games. Therefore, the four remaining teams were all qualified. Cuba won the final against Dominican Republic. They secured their second title.

== Round robin ==
Pos	Team	Pld	W	D	L	GF	GA	GD	Pts	Qualification
1	Dominican Republic (H)	3	2	0	1	86	80	+6	4	Final
2	Cuba	3	1	1	1	74	72	+2	3	Final
3	Puerto Rico	3	1	1	1	78	77	+1	3	Third place game
4	Mexico	3	1	0	2	79	88	−9	2	Third place game

Source: CDND
Rules for classification: 1) Points; 2) Head-to-head points; 3) Head-to-head goal difference; 4) Head-to-head goals scored; 5) Goal difference; 6) Goals scored; 7) Draw.
(H) Hosts

All times are local (UTC−04:00).

2 October 2022; 15:00	Puerto Rico	21–21	Cuba	Pabellón del Parque del Este, Santo Domingo
2 October 2022; 15:00		(10–16)	Leal 5	Pabellón del Parque del Este, Santo Domingo
2 October 2022; 15:00		Report		Pabellón del Parque del Este, Santo Domingo

2 October 2022; 18:00	Mexico	31–27	Dominican Republic	Pabellón del Parque del Este, Santo Domingo
2 October 2022; 18:00		Report		Pabellón del Parque del Este, Santo Domingo

4 October 2022; 15:00	Cuba	33–23	Mexico	Pabellón del Parque del Este, Santo Domingo
4 October 2022; 15:00	Márquez 8	(15–10)		Pabellón del Parque del Este, Santo Domingo
4 October 2022; 15:00		Report		Pabellón del Parque del Este, Santo Domingo

4 October 2022; 18:00	Dominican Republic	31–29	Puerto Rico	Pabellón del Parque del Este, Santo Domingo
4 October 2022; 18:00		Report		Pabellón del Parque del Este, Santo Domingo

6 October 2022; 15:00	Dominican Republic	28–20	Cuba	Pabellón del Parque del Este, Santo Domingo
6 October 2022; 15:00	Puello 10	(15–8)	Leal 9	Pabellón del Parque del Este, Santo Domingo
6 October 2022; 15:00		Report		Pabellón del Parque del Este, Santo Domingo

6 October 2022; 18:00	Mexico	25–28	Puerto Rico	Pabellón del Parque del Este, Santo Domingo
6 October 2022; 18:00	López 7	(11–14)	Graciani 7	Pabellón del Parque del Este, Santo Domingo
6 October 2022; 18:00		Report		Pabellón del Parque del Este, Santo Domingo

== Third place game ==
8 October 2022; 14:00	Puerto Rico	37–35	Mexico	Pabellón del Parque del Este, Santo Domingo
8 October 2022; 14:00	Fuetes 15	(18–13)		Pabellón del Parque del Este, Santo Domingo
8 October 2022; 14:00		Report		Pabellón del Parque del Este, Santo Domingo

== Final ==
8 October 2022; 18:00	Cuba	30–21	Dominican Republic	Pabellón del Parque del Este, Santo Domingo
8 October 2022; 18:00	González & Rodríguez 7	(19–15)	Wattley 5	Pabellón del Parque del Este, Santo Domingo
8 October 2022; 18:00		Report		Pabellón del Parque del Este, Santo Domingo
