= Carlos Pérez (handballer) =

Cuban handball player (born 1971)

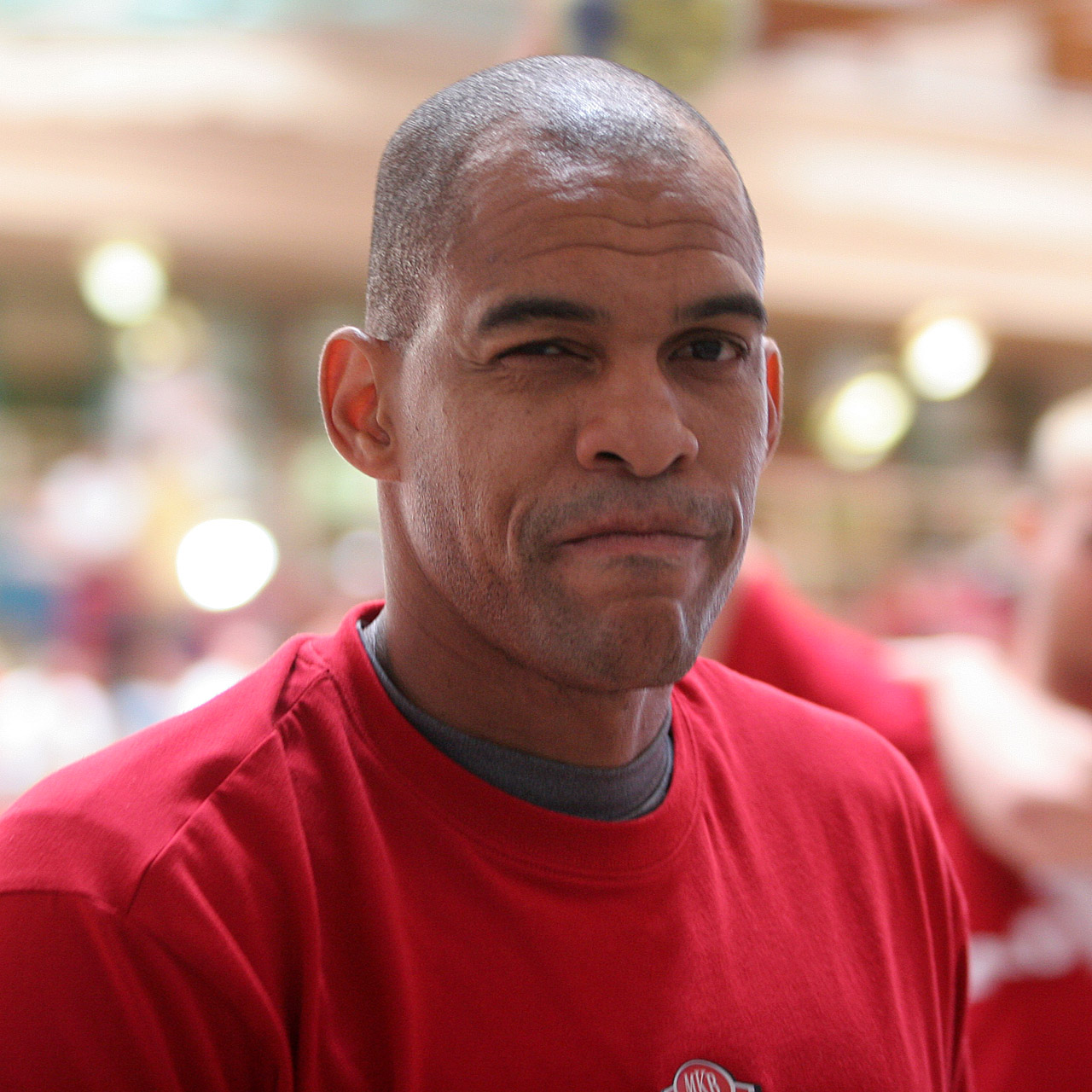

Personal information
- Full name: Carlos Reinaldo Pérez Enrique
- Nationality: Cuban, Hungarian
- Born: 26 August 1971 (age 55) Havana, Cuba
- Height: 1.98 m (6 ft 6 in)

Sport
- Sport: Handball
- Position: Left Back
- Current club: Retired

Senior clubs
- Years: Team
- –1997: Ciudad Havana
- 1997–2013: KC Veszprém
- 2013–2017: Al Shamal Handball Club
National team
Years	Team	Apps	
–1997	Cuba	171	
2002–2012	Hungary	55	(274)
Medal record
Pan American Championship
Gold medal – first place	1998 Havana
- Updated on 2018

Carlos Pérez (born 26 August 1971 in Havana) is a retired Cuban-Hungarian handball player, who played for Veszprém KC and both the Hungarian national team and the Cuba national team.

With Cuba he won the 1998 Pan American Championship. He was the top scorer at the tournament.

== Career ==
He was born in Havana and spent his Cuban years by local team Ciudad Havana. He signed to Hungarian top club MKB Veszprém KC in 1997 and since then spent all the seasons with the club.

He obtained Hungarian citizenship in 1999 and made his debut for the national team in 2002 against Slovenia. He represented Hungary at the 2003 World Championship, where he showed his exceptional shooting skills and finished first on the goalscoring charts with 64 goals. He has also been selected to the All-Star team. He participated in the 2004 Summer Olympics a year later and finished fourth.

Despite his good performances he had to wait seven years to appear on another major tournament, this time the 2011 World Championship. As he was permitted by his club to play on three games only, Hungarian head coach Lajos Mocsai saved him for the most important matches, and he was a late call-up to replace Péter Gulyás in the squad. He was part of the 2012 Summer Olympics Hungarian squad that finished fourth.

He was voted Hungarian Handballer of the Year three times in a row between 2003–2005, and won the award once again in 2011.

== Achievements ==
- Nemzeti Bajnokság I:
  - Winner: 1998, 1999, 2001, 2002, 2003, 2004, 2005, 2006, 2008, 2009, 2010, 2011, 2012
  - Silver Medalist: 2000, 2007
- Magyar Kupa:
  - Winner: 1998, 1999, 2000, 2002, 2003, 2004, 2005, 2007, 2009, 2010, 2011, 2012
  - Finalist: 2006, 2008
- EHF Champions League:
  - Finalist: 2002
  - Semifinalist: 2003, 2006
- EHF Cup Winners' Cup:
  - Winner: 2008
- EHF Champions Trophy:
  - Finalist: 2002, 2008

== Individual awards ==
- Hungarian Handballer of the Year: 2002, 2004, 2005, 2011
- Top Scorer of the World Championship: 2003
- All-Star Left Back of the World Championship (2003)
- Golden Cross of the Cross of Merit of the Republic of Hungary (2012)
- MOB Fair Play Award, (2014)
