= Rosa Leal =

Cuban handball player (born 1996)

Personal information
- Full name: Rosa de la Caridad Leal Armenteros
- Nationality: Cuban
- Born: 26 December 1996 (age 29)
- Height: 1.77 m (5 ft 10 in)

Sport
- Sport: Handball
- Position: Right wing
- Current club: La Habana
National team
Years	Team	Apps	(Gls)
–	Cuba	17	(17)
Medal record
Pan American Games
Bronze medal – third place	2019 Lima	Team
Central American and Caribbean Games
Gold medal – first place	2023 San Salvador	Team

Rosa de la Caridad Leal Armenteros (born 26 December 1996) is a Cuban handball player for La Habana and the Cuban national team.

She represented Cuba at the 2019 World Women's Handball Championship.
