= 2022 Caribbean Men's Handball Cup =

Tournament details
- Host country: Dominican Republic
- City: 1
- Venue(s): 1 (in 1 host city)
- Dates: 3 – 9 October
- Teams: 4 (from 1 confederation)

Final positions
- Champions: Dominican Republic (2nd title)
- Runner-up: Cuba
- Third place: Mexico
- Fourth place: Puerto Rico

The 2022 Caribbean Men's Handball Cup took place in Santo Domingo, Dominican Republic, from 3 to 9 October 2022. Columbia and Dominica were also announced as participant but they didn't play any game. It acted as a qualifying tournament for the 2023 Central American and Caribbean Games. The 5 best teams would have received a spot at the 2023 Central American and Caribbean Games. Therefore, the four remaining teams were all qualified. The Dominican Republic won the final against Cuba. They secured their second title.

== Round robin ==
Pos	Team	Pld	W	D	L	GF	GA	GD	Pts	Qualification
1	Dominican Republic (H)	3	3	0	0	85	76	+9	6	Final
2	Cuba	3	2	0	1	96	74	+22	4	Final
3	Mexico	3	1	0	2	88	91	−3	2	Third place game
4	Puerto Rico	3	0	0	3	73	101	−28	0	Third place game

Source: CDND
Rules for classification: 1) Points; 2) Head-to-head points; 3) Head-to-head goal difference; 4) Head-to-head goals scored; 5) Goal difference; 6) Goals scored; 7) Draw.
(H) Hosts

All times are local (UTC−04:00).

3 October 2022; 15:00	Cuba	32–29	Mexico	Pabellón del Parque del Este, Santo Domingo
3 October 2022; 15:00	Toledano 6	(14–14)		Pabellón del Parque del Este, Santo Domingo
3 October 2022; 15:00		Report		Pabellón del Parque del Este, Santo Domingo

3 October 2022; 18:00	Puerto Rico	24–30	Dominican Republic	Pabellón del Parque del Este, Santo Domingo
3 October 2022; 18:00		(9–14)	Objío 6	Pabellón del Parque del Este, Santo Domingo
3 October 2022; 18:00		Report		Pabellón del Parque del Este, Santo Domingo

5 October 2022; 15:00	Mexico	34–32	Puerto Rico	Pabellón del Parque del Este, Santo Domingo
5 October 2022; 15:00		Report		Pabellón del Parque del Este, Santo Domingo

5 October 2022; 18:00	Dominican Republic	28–27	Cuba	Pabellón del Parque del Este, Santo Domingo
5 October 2022; 18:00		Report		Pabellón del Parque del Este, Santo Domingo

7 October 2022; 16:00	Puerto Rico	17–37	Cuba	Pabellón del Parque del Este, Santo Domingo
7 October 2022; 16:00		Report		Pabellón del Parque del Este, Santo Domingo

7 October 2022; 18:00	Dominican Republic	27–25	Mexico	Pabellón del Parque del Este, Santo Domingo
7 October 2022; 18:00		Report		Pabellón del Parque del Este, Santo Domingo

== Third place game ==
9 October 2022; 16:00	Mexico	28–21	Puerto Rico	Pabellón del Parque del Este, Santo Domingo
9 October 2022; 16:00	Sandoval 7	(12–11)	Nieves 7	Pabellón del Parque del Este, Santo Domingo
9 October 2022; 16:00		Report		Pabellón del Parque del Este, Santo Domingo

== Final ==
9 October 2022
18:00
Dominican Republic
27–25 (ET)
Cuba
Pabellón del Parque del Este, Santo Domingo
Soto & De la Cruz 6
(14–12)
Toledano 8

Report

FT: 25–25 ET: 4–2
