= El Maní =

Community in Sabanetas, Mayagüez, Puerto Rico

Coordinates: 18.2407863°N 67.1696245°W

El Maní is a community located along the coast in the Sabanetas barrio of Mayagüez on the island of Puerto Rico. El Mani Pavilion is located there.

== Facilities inside El Maní ==
This community houses an elementary public school and the Esteban Rosado Baez Junior High School, a municipal police and paramedical station, some Protestant churches, a Catholic chapel, a fishermen village and three baseball fields. Near its southern entrance is located one flea market (Pulguero) and an artificial lake. At its northern entrance on the junction of PR-64 and PR-341 roads is located a sport complex that includes a baseball field and the El Mani Pavilion which held the handball events of the 2010 Central American and Caribbean Games.

To the north of El Maní is the Boquilla Creek Wildlife Reserve (Reserva Natural del Caño de la Boquilla).

== Other attractions and facilities ==
At the northeastern end of El Maní community is the PR-2, PR-64 and PR-342 junction. Next to this hub is the Eugenio María de Hostos Airport. Near the airport are some restaurants and the Western Plaza Shopping Center.

== Gallery ==
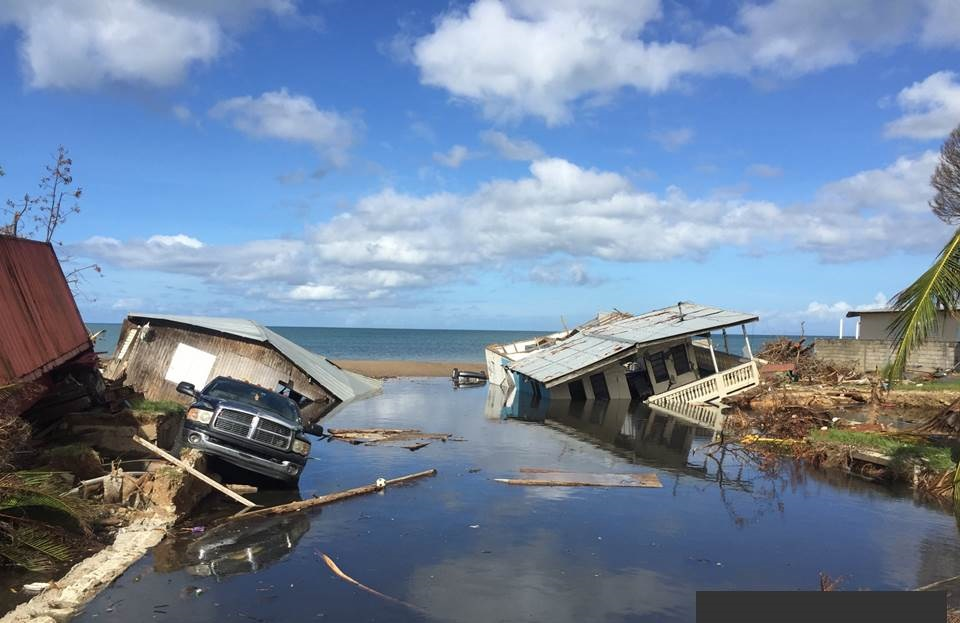
Section of El Maní immediately after Hurricane Maria (September 20, 2017)

== See also ==
- List of communities in Puerto Rico
