= Handball at the 2010 Central American and Caribbean Games =

- Venue: Palacio de Recreación y Deportes and El Mani Pavilion
- Location: Mayaguez
- Dates: 18–30 July

The Handball competition at the 2010 Central American and Caribbean Games was held in Mayagüez, Puerto Rico.

The men's tournament was scheduled to be held from 25–30 July, the women's tournament was scheduled to be held from 18–25 July at the Palacio de Recreación y Deportes, the El Mani Pavilion in El Mani; all in Mayagüez.

== Medallists ==
Event	Gold	Silver	Bronze
Men's tournament	Dominican Republic; Juan Tapia; Kelvin de León; Leony de León; Luis Taveras; Franalbert Aybar; Carlos Miraval; Junior Brito; Geraldo Díaz; Willyvaldo Paulino; Pablo Jacobo; Luis Sanlate; Félix Romero; Julio Almeida; Dioris Mateo; Maximo Batista; Elvin Fis	Venezuela; Ronal Timaure; Cristhofer Timaure; Elwing Zambrano; Eduardo Rodríguez; Ivan Pérez; Raúl Rodríguez; Enmanuel Godoy; Ali Barranco; Jhonny Peñazola; Víctor López; Emilio Tovar; Jesús Guarecuco; Wilmer Bracho; Juan Villalobos; Carlos Padrón; Drubil Silva	Mexico; Adrian Romero; José Sillas; Alan Villalobos; Luis Ramírez; Marcial Acuna; Jorge Hurtado; Pedro Ceballos; Jose Garcia; Victor Bernal; Julio Mendoza; Erick Flores; Luis Agüero; Moises Luna; Emiliano Contreras; Javier Espinoza; Christian Bermudez
Women's tournament	Dominican Republic; Cari Domínguez; Damaris Bencomo; Ysmeyri de la Rosa; Ingrid Santos; Judith Granado; Johanna Pimentel; Nancy Peña; Mariela Andino; Viviana Rosa; Katherine Recio; Suleidy Suárez; Carolina López; Yacaira Tejada; Mariela Cespedes; Ironelly Jabalera	Puerto Rico; Adriana Cabrera; Natalia Santos; Kitza Escobar; Nathalys Ceballo; Sheila Hiraldo; Joane Vergara; Jailene Maldonado; Natalia Lopez; Joanne Ortíz; Roxanna Carrasquillo; Jackeline González; Cristal Escalera; Lauritza Correa; Génesis Ortíz; Sharmaine Figueroa	Mexico; Adela Valenzuela; Claudia González; Itzel Aguirre; Brenda Ramírez; Ana Sosa; Guadalupe Saavedra; Lenet Rodríguez; Selene Sifuentes; Yesselly García; Violeta Yedra; Karla Aranda; Blanca Flores; Jessica Parra; Diana Moreno; Laura Meléndez; Monica Saldaña

== Men's tournament ==
=== Pool A ===
Team	Pld	W	D	L	GF	GA	GDIF	Points
Mexico	3	3	0	0	100	72	+28	6
Puerto Rico	3	2	0	1	95	70	+25	4
Guatemala	3	1	0	2	91	98	−7	2
El Salvador	3	0	0	3	72	118	−46	0

25 July 2010	Mexico	32 – 21	Guatemala	El Mani Pavilion, Mayagüez

25 July 2010	Puerto Rico	37 – 13	El Salvador	El Mani Pavilion, Mayagüez

26 July 2010	El Salvador	25 – 41	Mexico	El Mani Pavilion, Mayagüez

26 July 2010	Guatemala	30 – 32	Puerto Rico	El Mani Pavilion, Mayagüez

27 July 2010	Guatemala	40 – 34	El Salvador	El Mani Pavilion, Mayagüez

27 July 2010	Mexico	27 – 26	Puerto Rico	El Mani Pavilion, Mayagüez

=== Pool B ===
Team	Pld	W	D	L	GF	GA	GDIF	Points
Dominican Republic	3	3	0	0	100	36	+64	6
Venezuela	3	2	0	1	84	71	+13	4
Nicaragua	3	1	0	2	36	113	−77	2
Cuba	3	0	0	3	0	0	0	withdrew

25 July 2010	Venezuela	57 – 27	Nicaragua	El Mani Pavilion, Mayagüez

26 July 2010	Nicaragua	9 – 56	Dominican Republic	El Mani Pavilion, Mayagüez

27 July 2010	Dominican Republic	44 – 27	Venezuela	El Mani Pavilion, Mayagüez

=== Medal round ===
Semi-finals
July 29 – El Mani Pavilion
Mexico	23
Venezuela	29
July 29 – El Mani Pavilion
Dominican Republic	38
Puerto Rico	32

Final
July 30 – El Mani Pavilion
Venezuela	28
Dominican Republic	40
Bronze-final
July 30 – El Mani Pavilion
Mexico	30
Puerto Rico	24

=== 5th–8th places ===
5th–8th places
July 29 – El Mani Pavilion
El Salvador	19
Nicaragua	34
July 29 – El Mani Pavilion
Guatemala
BYE

5th place
July 30 – El Mani Pavilion
Nicaragua	32
Guatemala	39
7th place
July 30 – El Mani Pavilion
El Salvador
BYE

== Women's tournament ==
Team	Pld	W	D	L	GF	GA	GDIF	Points
Dominican Republic	5	5	0	0	205	98	+107	10
Mexico	5	4	0	1	182	108	+74	8
Puerto Rico	5	3	0	2	156	96	+60	6
Costa Rica	5	2	0	3	85	174	−89	4
El Salvador	5	1	0	4	115	171	−56	2
Guatemala	5	0	0	5	79	176	−97	0

18 July 2010	Mexico	42 – 14	Guatemala	El Mani Pavilion, Mayagüez

18 July 2010	Dominican Republic	48 – 21	El Salvador	El Mani Pavilion, Mayagüez

18 July 2010	Puerto Rico	39 – 12	Costa Rica	El Mani Pavilion, Mayagüez

19 July 2010	Guatemala	13 – 49	Dominican Republic	El Mani Pavilion, Mayagüez

19 July 2010	Costa Rica	14 – 56	Mexico	El Mani Pavilion, Mayagüez

19 July 2010	El Salvador	16 – 34	Puerto Rico	El Mani Pavilion, Mayagüez

20 July 2010	Dominican Republic	41 – 14	Costa Rica	El Mani Pavilion, Mayagüez

20 July 2010	El Salvador	33 – 23	Guatemala	El Mani Pavilion, Mayagüez

20 July 2010	Puerto Rico	21 – 24	Mexico	El Mani Pavilion, Mayagüez

21 July 2010	Costa Rica	29 – 24	El Salvador	El Mani Pavilion, Mayagüez

21 July 2010	Mexico	23 – 38	Dominican Republic	El Mani Pavilion, Mayagüez

21 July 2010	Puerto Rico	35 – 15	Guatemala	El Mani Pavilion, Mayagüez

23 July 2010	Guatemala	14 – 16	Costa Rica	El Mani Pavilion, Mayagüez

23 July 2010	Mexico	37 – 21	El Salvador	El Mani Pavilion, Mayagüez

23 July 2010	Dominican Republic	29 – 27	Puerto Rico	El Mani Pavilion, Mayagüez

=== Medal round ===
Semi-finals
July 24 – El Mani Pavilion
Dominican Republic	36
Costa Rica	10
July 24 – El Mani Pavilion
Mexico	21
Puerto Rico	24

Final
July 25 – El Mani Pavilion
Dominican Republic	27
Puerto Rico	19
Bronze-final
July 25 – El Mani Pavilion
Costa Rica	16
Mexico	41
