= 2006 Pan American Men's Handball Championship =

Tournament details
- Host country: Brazil
- Venue(s): 1 (in 1 host city)
- Dates: 6–10 June
- Teams: 8 (from 1 confederation)

Final positions
- Champions: Brazil (1st title)
- Runner-up: Argentina
- Third place: Greenland
- Fourth place: United States

Tournament statistics
- Matches played: 20
- Goals scored: 1,124 (56.2 per match)

The 2006 Pan American Men's Handball Championship was the twelfth edition of the tournament, held in Aracaju, Brazil from 6 to 10 June 2006. It acted as the American qualifying tournament for the 2007 World Championship, where the top three placed team qualied.

== Preliminary round ==
All times are local (UTC−2).

=== Group A ===
Pos	Team	Pld	W	D	L	GF	GA	GD	Pts	Qualification
1	Brazil (H)	3	3	0	0	116	65	+51	6	Semifinals
2	Greenland	3	2	0	1	81	97	−16	4	Semifinals
3	Chile	3	1	0	2	83	106	−23	2	
4	Uruguay	3	0	0	3	78	90	−12	0	

Source: Todor66
Rules for classification: 1) points; 2) head-to-head points; 3) head-to-head goal difference; 4) head-to-head number of goals scored; 5) goal difference.
(H) Hosts

6 June 2006; 14:00	Greenland	32–30	Chile
6 June 2006; 14:00		(16–18)

6 June 2006; 20:30	Brazil	31–22	Uruguay
6 June 2006; 20:30		(11–11)

7 June 2006; 16:00	Chile	27–26	Uruguay
7 June 2006; 16:00		(16–11)

7 June 2006; 20:00	Brazil	37–17	Greenland
7 June 2006; 20:00		(21–10)

8 June 2006; 16:00	Greenland	32–30	Uruguay
8 June 2006; 16:00		(14–14)

8 June 2006; 20:00	Brazil	48–26	Chile
8 June 2006; 20:00		(22–15)

=== Group B ===
Pos	Team	Pld	W	D	L	GF	GA	GD	Pts	Qualification
1	Argentina	3	3	0	0	107	54	+53	6	Semifinals
2	United States	3	1	1	1	76	91	−15	3	Semifinals
3	Puerto Rico	3	1	0	2	79	87	−8	2	
4	Mexico	3	0	1	2	63	93	−30	1	

Source: Todor66
Rules for classification: 1) points; 2) head-to-head points; 3) head-to-head goal difference; 4) head-to-head number of goals scored; 5) goal difference.

6 June 2006; 16:00	Argentina	38–20	Puerto Rico
6 June 2006; 16:00		(19–10)

6 June 2006; 18:00	United States	28–28	Mexico
6 June 2006; 18:00		(11–11)

7 June 2006; 14:00	United States	28–25	Puerto Rico
7 June 2006; 14:00		(10–8)

7 June 2006; 18:00	Argentina	31–14	Mexico
7 June 2006; 18:00		(19–8)

8 June 2006; 14:00	Puerto Rico	34–21	Mexico
8 June 2006; 14:00		(17–11)

8 June 2006; 18:00	Argentina	38–20	United States
8 June 2006; 18:00		(18–7)

== Knockout stage ==
=== Bracket ===
Semi-finals
Brazil	39
United States	16
Argentina	32
Greenland	18

Final
Brazil	28
Argentina	23
Third place
United States	29
Greenland	30

Fifth place bracket

Semi-finals
Chile	34
Mexico	24
Puerto Rico	22
Uruguay	34

Final
Chile	27
Uruguay	19
Third place
Mexico	35
Puerto Rico	31

=== 5–8th place semifinals ===
9 June 2006; 14:00	Uruguay	34–22	Puerto Rico
9 June 2006; 14:00		(19–14)

9 June 2006; 16:00	Chile	34–24	Mexico
9 June 2006; 16:00		(12–17)

=== Semifinals ===
9 June 2006; 18:00	Brazil	39–16	United States
9 June 2006; 18:00		(20–7)

9 June 2006; 20:00	Argentina	32–18	Greenland
9 June 2006; 20:00		(14–9)

=== Seventh place game ===
10 June 2006; 14:00	Mexico	35–31	Puerto Rico
10 June 2006; 14:00		(19–14)

=== Fifth place game ===
10 June 2006; 16:00	Chile	27–19	Uruguay
10 June 2006; 16:00		(13–12)

=== Third place game ===
10 June 2006; 18:00	Greenland	30–29	United States
10 June 2006; 18:00		(14–13)

=== Final ===
10 June 2006; 20:00	Brazil	28–23	Argentina
10 June 2006; 20:00		(11–12)

== Final ranking ==
Qualified for the 2007 World Championship

Rank	Team
Gold medal	Brazil
Silver medal	Argentina
Bronze medal	Greenland
4	United States
5	Chile
6	Uruguay
7	Mexico
8	Puerto Rico
