= Handball at the 2002 Central American and Caribbean Games =

- Location: San Salvador
- Dates: November 21–December 3

The Handball competition at the 2002 Central American and Caribbean Games was held in Santo Domingo, Dominican Republic. The tournament was scheduled to be held from November 21– December 3, 2002.

== Medal summary ==
Event	Gold	Silver	Bronze
Men's tournament	Dominican Republic; Juan Tapia; Kelvin de León; Leony de León; Antonio Sosa; Luis Taveras; Ángel Sepúlveda; Luis Montero; Junior Brito; Carlos Correa; Willyvaldo Paulino; Pablo Jacobo; Luis Sanlate; Marcos Benítez	Puerto Rico; Félix González; Isael Santos; José Díaz; Carlos Rivera; Alberto Pizarro; Héctor Villanueva; Enrique Pérez; Ángel Soya; Luis Vargas; Rafael Cepeda; Edgardo Vélez; Rafael Báez; Juan Cepeda; ~~Tomás Quiñones~~	Mexico; José Santos; Raúl Carpoforo; Jorge González; Alberto González; Ángel Rojas; Vicente Pérez; Luis Stoopen; Edson Rascón; Julio Camarillo; Rodrigo Dominguez; Arturo Rodríguez; Radamés Solís; Alejandro Amaraz; Juan Esteva
Women's tournament	Dominican Republic; Rafaela Rodríguez; Ofelia Vázquez; Crisleidy Hernández; Sención López; Ingrid Santos; Franni Cabrera; Yndiana Mateo; Nancy Peña; Carolin Díaz; Cruz Santana; Milsia Ureña; Glenis Sosa; Yudelkis Acosta	Mexico; Teresa Hernández; Adda Alanis; Dorian Avelar; Axochiti Bustos; Yuria Sema; Adriana Flores; Herenia Gutiérrez; Virginia Esquivel; Blanca Guzmán; Perla Salinas; Berenice Esquivel; María Lara; Monica Piña	Puerto Rico; María Serrano; Sally Kirkland; Suzette Rivera; María Rosado; Dayna Milete; Minerva Rodríguez; Leichelie Guzmán; María Díaz; Zoraida Rosario; Michelle Benítez; Joanne Ortiz; Graciela Villegas; Cristal Escalera; ~~Elia Fontanet~~

== Medal table ==
Rank	Nation	Gold	Silver	Bronze	Total
1	Dominican Republic	2	0	0	2
2	Mexico	0	1	1	2
2	Puerto Rico	0	1	1	2
Totals (3 entries)		2	2	2	6
