= Ervin González =

Colombian footballer (born 1985)

Personal information
- Full name: Ervin Alberto González Millán
- Date of birth: August 25, 1985 (age 41)
- Place of birth: Villanueva, Colombia
- Height: 1.69 m (5 ft 7 in)
- Position: Forward

Youth career
- 2003: Deportivo Pereira

Senior career*
Years	Team	Apps	(Gls)
2004–2006	Deportivo Pereira	73	(5)
2007–2008	Millonarios	47	(1)
2009	Atlético Huila	31	(1)
2010	Millonarios	25	(1)
2011–2012	La Equidad	14	(0)
- * Club domestic league appearances and goals as of April 19, 2013

Ervin González (born August 25, 1985 in Villanueva, Guajira) is a Colombian football forward, who currently plays for La Equidad in the Categoría Primera A.
