= El Mani Pavilion =

Pavilion in El Mani, Mayagüez, Puerto Rico

Coordinates: 18°14′49.26″N 67°10′27.01″W

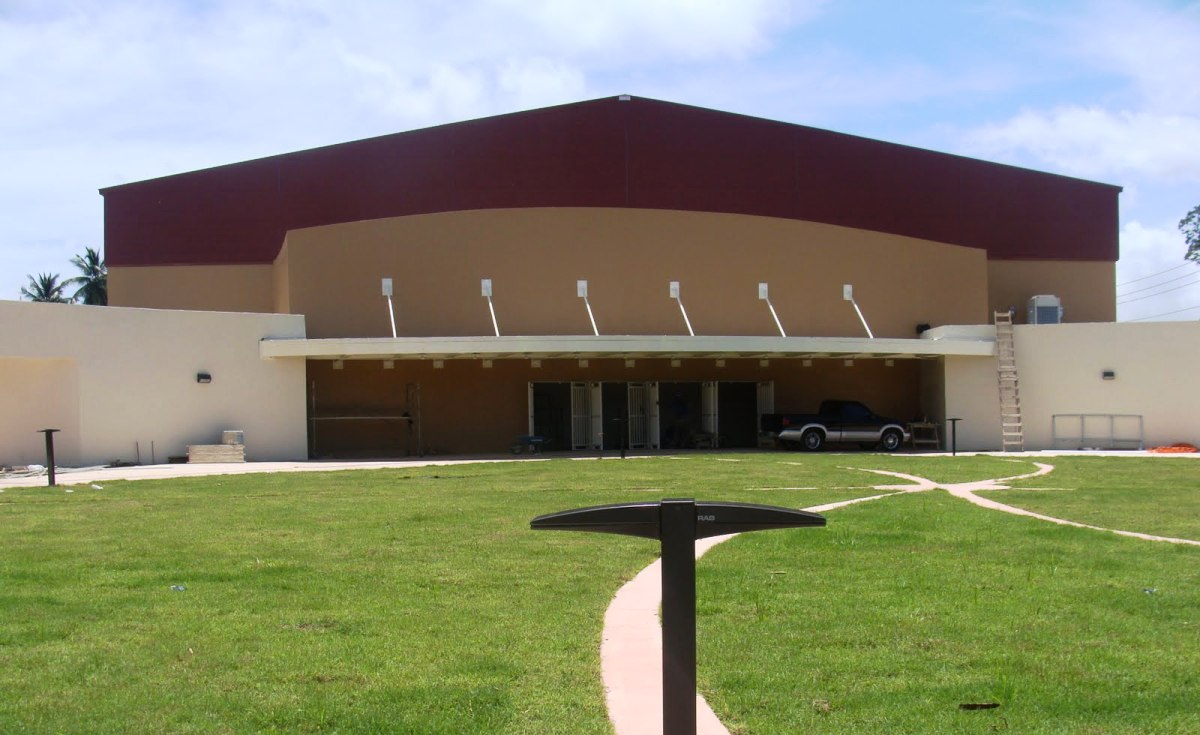
- Interactive map of El Mani Pavilion
- Location: Sabanetas, Mayagüez
- Capacity: 2,500

Construction
- Built: 2010
- Opened: 2010
- Cost: $3,500,000

El Mani Pavilion Pabellon De Boxeo El Maní is a pavilion in El Mani, Mayagüez, Puerto Rico. Prior to the construction of the pavilion, the site had been occupied by a covered basketball court; this was demolished to make way for the new building. Its construction cost $3,500,000. It was to host events of the 2010 Central American and Caribbean Games. Boxing and mixed martial arts events are held at the Pavilion. A jump roping competition with over 400 participants was held at the Mani Pavilion in 2019.

The pavilion has also been the venue for community health clinics, events managed by soldiers in the United States military.
