= Drean Dutra =

Brazilian handball player (born 1966)

Personal information
- Born: 4 March 1966 (age 59); Itajaí, Brazil

Sport
- Sport: Handball

Drean Dutra (born 4 March 1966) is a Brazilian former handball player. He competed in the men's tournament at the 1992 Summer Olympics.
