= Handball at the 2006 Central American and Caribbean Games =

- Venue: Pabellón de Balonmano, Santo Domingo Este
- Location: Santo Domingo, Dominican Republic
- Dates: 15-30 July

The Handball competition at the 2006 Central American and Caribbean Games was held in Santo Domingo, Dominican Republic. The tournament was scheduled to be held from 15–30 July 2006.

== Medal summary ==
Event	Gold	Silver	Bronze
Men's tournament	Dominican Republic; Kelvin de León; Leony de León; Antonio Sosa; Luis Taveras; Rafael Pujols; Luis Montero; Junior Brito; Francisco Abreu; Willyvaldo Paulino; Pablo Jacobo; Marcos Benítez; Dioris Mateo; Félix Romero; Maximo Batista; Juan Tapia; Luis Sanlate	Cuba; Misael Iglesias; Guillermo Corso; Randy Diaz; Franklin Carol; Leonardo Cobas; Denip Fonseca; Eurelbis Valdes; Julio Almeida; Edgard Marti; Jorge Pavan; Yinkelly Tomacen; Rafael Dacosta; Ariel Paz; Carlos Mirabal; Yasser Ramos; Yusnier Gonzalez	Mexico; Marcial Acuna; Christian Bermudez; Alejandro Camargo; Ignacio Ceron; Rafael Contreras; Rodrigo Dominguez; Jorge Garcia; Jose Garcia; Jorge Gonzalez; Moises Luna; Julio Mendoza; Angel Rojas; Adrian Romero; Arturo Rosas; Jose Santos; Luis Stoopen
Women's tournament	Cuba; Aylin Martinez; Lisandra Luson; Suleiky Gomez; Virgen Murillo; Caridad Vizcay; Arazay Duran; Yasnay Turro; Yohania Marti; Maydelis Sardinas; Eneleidys Guevara; Nadezza Valera; Neivis Mederos; Ariagne Cuesta; Maidolis Pournier; Yanet Cantillo; Damari Bencomo	Dominican Republic; Ofelia Vázquez; Crisleidy Hernández; Nalgelis Amparo; Ingrid Santos; Judith Granado; Yndiana Mateo; Nancy Peña; Mariela Andino; Glenis Sosa; Cruz Santana; Rafaela Rodríguez; Suleidy Suárez	Puerto Rico; Nathalys Ceballos; Nidia Colón; Lauritza Correa; Frances Delgado; María Díaz; Brenda Encarnación; Cristal Escalera; Kitza Escobar; Ciris García; Jackeline González; Sheila Hiraldo; Sally Kirkland; Natalia Lopez; Joanne Ortíz; Suzette Rivera; Maria Serrano

== Medal table ==
Rank	Nation	Gold	Silver	Bronze	Total
1	Cuba	1	1	0	2
1	Dominican Republic	1	1	0	2
3	Mexico	0	0	1	1
3	Puerto Rico	0	0	1	1
Totals (4 entries)		2	2	2	6
