= Sabanetas, Mayagüez, Puerto Rico =

Barrio of Puerto Rico

Sabanetas
- Barrio
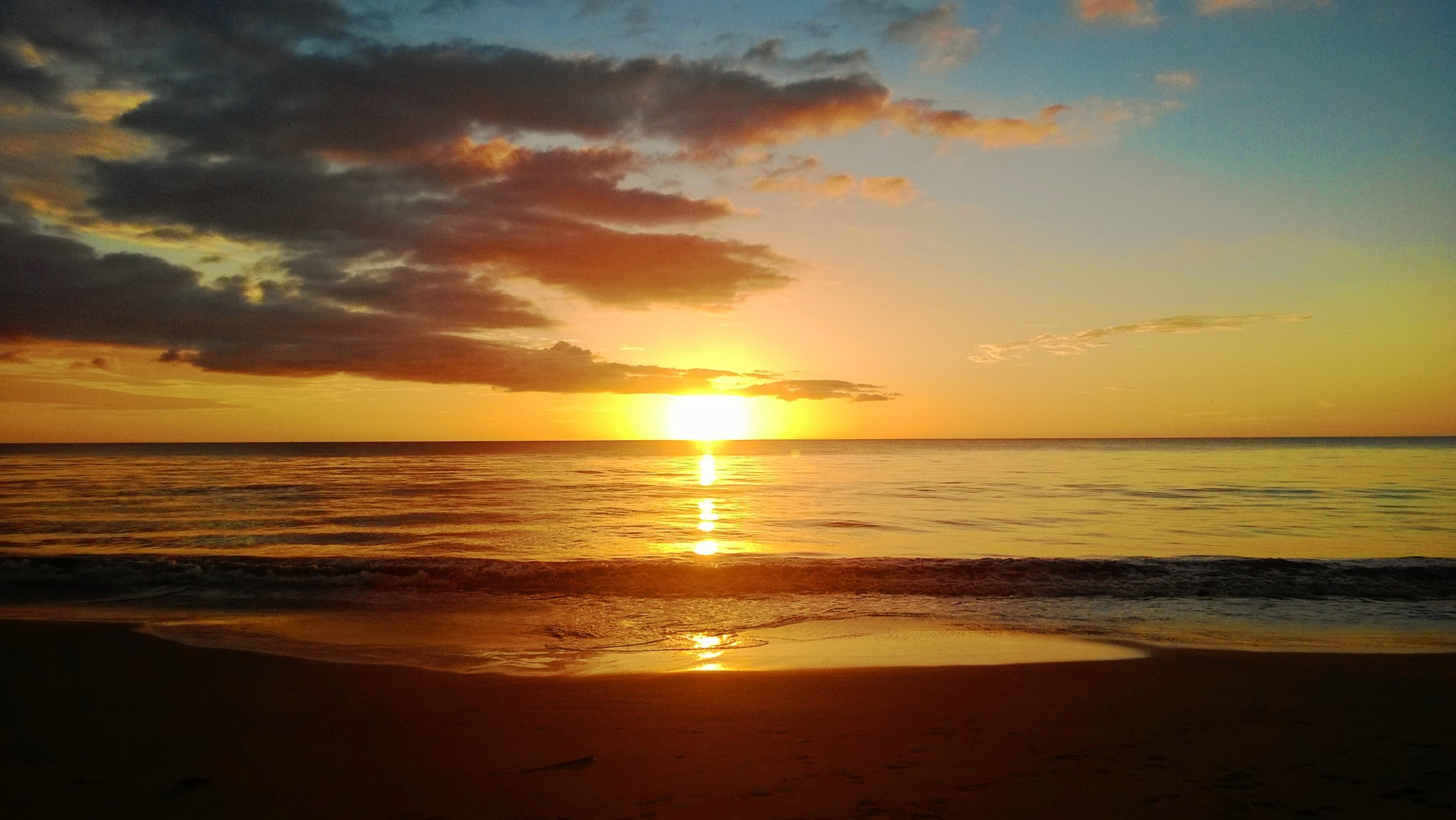
- El Maní Beach at sunset

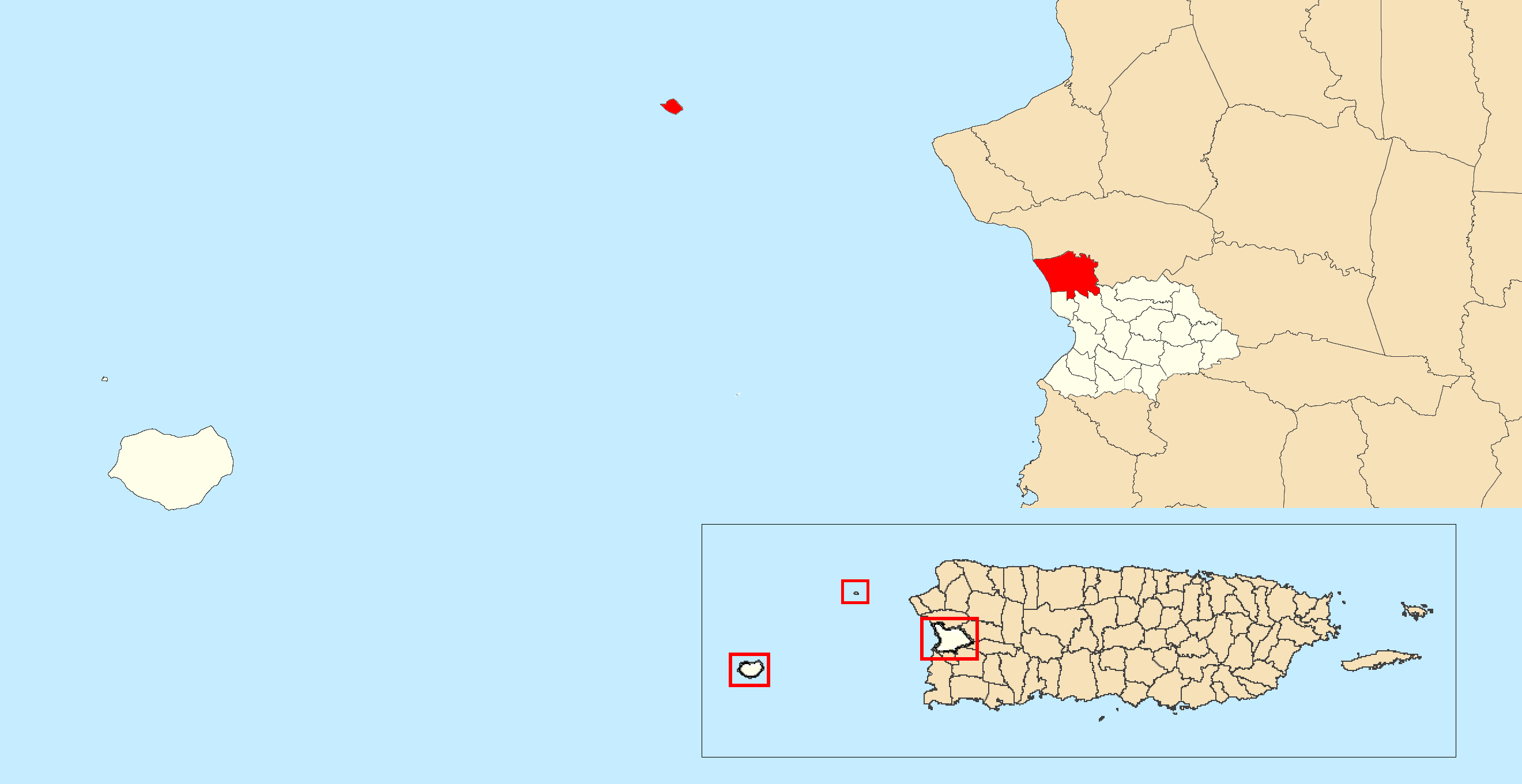
- Location of Sabanetas within the municipality of Mayagüez shown in red

- Location of Puerto Rico
- Coordinates: 18°15′38″N 67°10′57″W
- Commonwealth: Puerto Rico
- Municipality: Mayagüez

Area
  - Total: 8.30 sq mi (21.5 km^{2})
  - Land: 6.46 sq mi (16.7 km^{2})
  - Water: 1.84 sq mi (4.8 km^{2})
- Elevation: 3 ft (0.91 m)

Population (2010)
  - Total: 4,005
  - Density: 620/sq mi (240/km^{2})
- Source: 2010 Census
- Time zone: UTC−4 (AST)

Sabanetas is a barrio in the municipality of Mayagüez, Puerto Rico. Its population in 2010 was 4,005.

== History ==
Sabanetas was in Spain's gazetteers until Puerto Rico was ceded by Spain in the aftermath of the Spanish–American War under the terms of the Treaty of Paris of 1898 and became an unincorporated territory of the United States. In 1899, the United States Department of War conducted a census of Puerto Rico finding that the population of Sabanetas barrio was 1,401.

Historical population
Census	Pop.	Note	%±
1900	1,401		—
1910	1,560		11.3%
1920	1,480		−5.1%
1930	1,501		1.4%
1940	1,815		20.9%
1950	2,413		32.9%
1960	2,815		16.7%
1970	3,160		12.3%
1980	3,418		8.2%
1990	3,794		11.0%
2000	4,161		9.7%
2010	4,005		−3.7%
U.S. Decennial Census; 1899 (shown as 1900) 1910-1930; 1930-1950 1980-2000 2010

== Name ==
Sabanetas Barrio is a coastal rural and riverside barrio, which borders the municipality of Añasco to the north. It derives its name from the plains or savannas found in the northern beaches of Mayagüez, in front of the Mona Channel, and in the vicinity of the mouth of the river now called the Río Grande de Añasco. It is one of two barrios in Mayagüez whose jurisdiction extends from the main island, because its jurisdiction includes the hilly island of Desecheo, whose name is a Taino name which means "hilly land". "Eta" in the "Sabana" noun suffix means an indicative of the extent of these savannas is limited in nature, as indeed it is, because it is located among the sea of the West Indies, the Goaorabo River, the swamp of the convent, the caño of La Boquilla and the hills of Algarrobos and Miradero.

== Notable landmarks ==
Sabanetas is home the El Mani community. Inside Sabanetas barrio the El Mani Pavilion is located, where the handball events were held for the 2010 Central American and Caribbean Games. The Boquilla Creek Wildlife Reserve (Reserva Natural del Caño de la Boquilla) is also located in Sabanetas. Also the Desecheo National Wildlife Refuge. The Eugenio María de Hostos Airport regional airport is located inside the boundaries of the barrio.

== Gallery ==
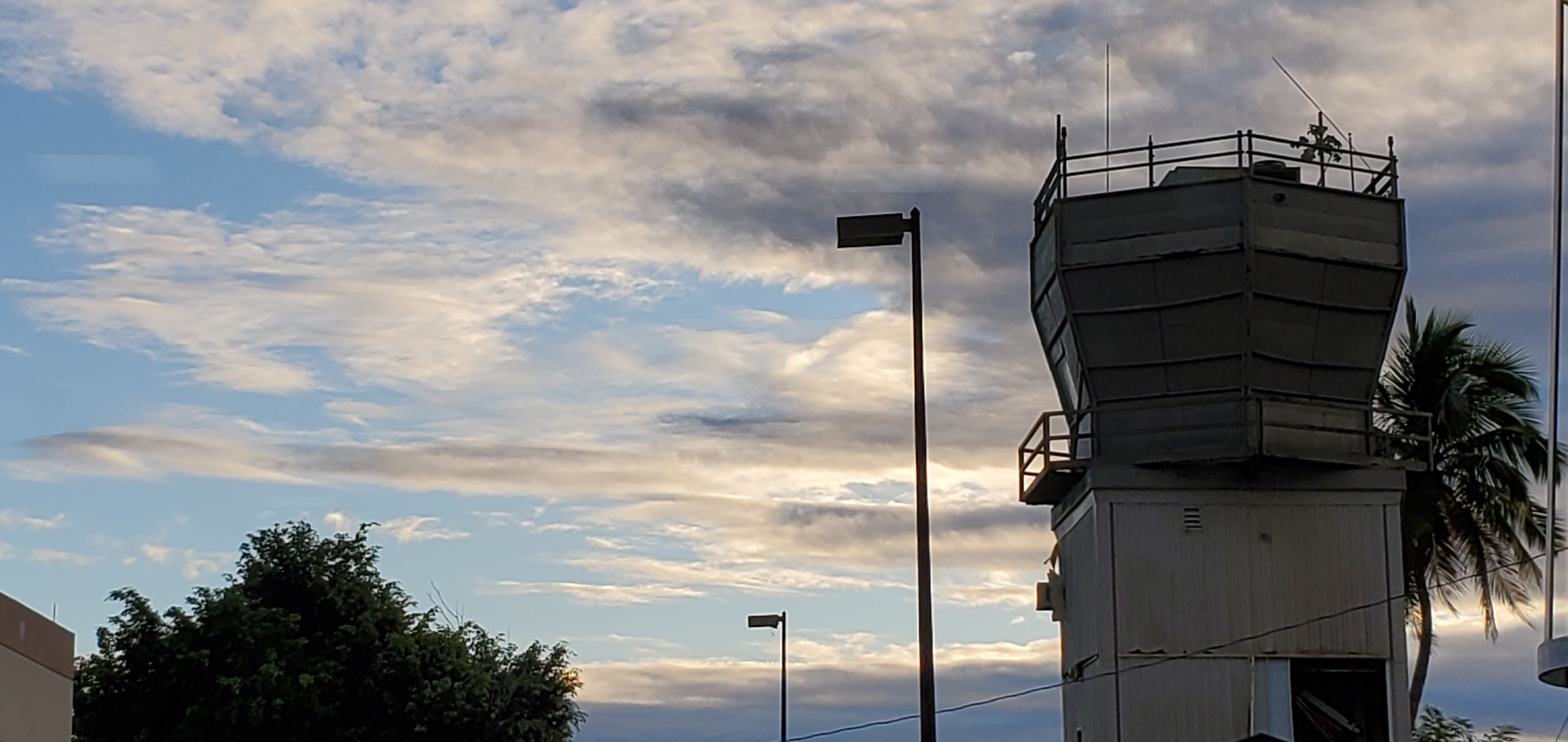
Eugenio Maria de Hostos Airport Tower in Sabanetas

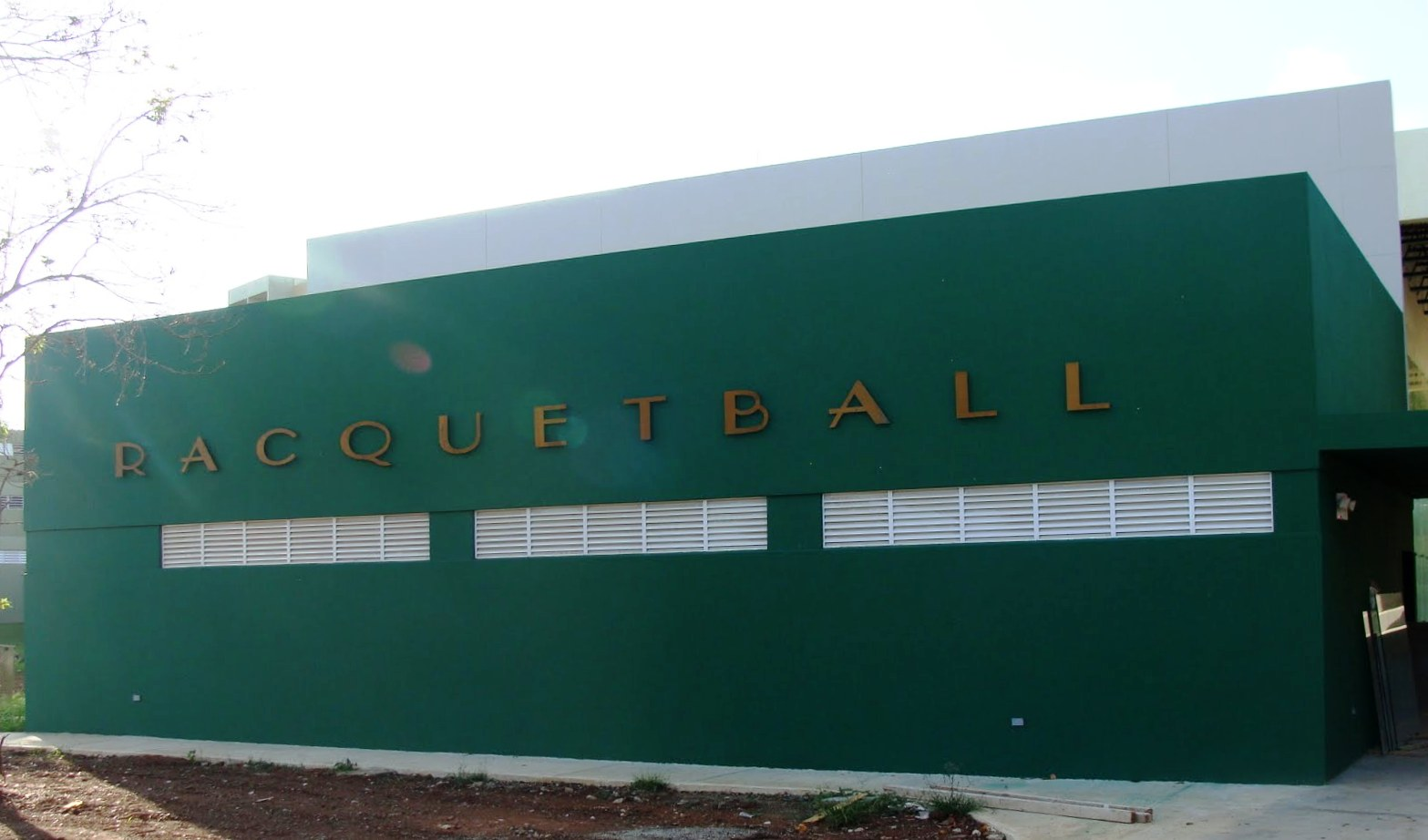
El Maní Pavilion

== See also ==
- List of communities in Puerto Rico
