= Puerto Rico men's national handball team =

Takes part in international handball competitions

Puerto Rico

Information
- Association: Federación de Balonmano de Puerto Rico
- Coach: Harold Millan

Colours
| 1st | 2nd |

Results

Pan American Championship
- Appearances: 7 (First in 1983)
- Best result: 6th (1983, 1989, 2004, 2016)
- Last updated on Unknown.

The Puerto Rico national handball team is the national team of Puerto Rico. It takes part in international handball competitions.

== Tournament record ==
=== Pan American Championship ===
| Year | Round | Position | GP | W | D* | L | GS | GA |
|---|---|---|---|---|---|---|---|---|
| (United States) 1983 | round robin | 6 | 5 | 0 | 0 | 5 | 79 | 220 |
| (Cuba) 1989 | round robin | 6 | 5 | 0 | 0 | 5 | 78 | 168 |
| (United States) 1996 | 7th place match | 7 | 5 | 1 | 0 | 4 | 90 | 158 |
| (Chile) 2004 | 5th place match | 6 | 5 | 2 | 0 | 3 | 124 | 155 |
| (Brazil) 2006 | 7th place match | 8 | 5 | 1 | 0 | 4 | 132 | 156 |
| (Argentina) 2016 | 5th place match | 6 | 7 | 4 | 0 | 3 | 197 | 216 |
| (Greenland) 2018 | 7th place match | 7 | 6 | 3 | 0 | 3 | 164 | 171 |

=== Pan American Games ===
- 1995 – 6th
- 1999 – 7th
- 2003 – 6th

| Games | Round | Position | Pld | W | D | L | GF | GA | GD |
|---|---|---|---|---|---|---|---|---|---|
| (Canada) 2015 Toronto | 5th place match | 5th | 5 | 2 | 0 | 3 | 136 | 171 | -35 |

=== Central American and Caribbean Games ===
| Games | Round | Position | Pld | W | D | L | GF | GA | GD |
|---|---|---|---|---|---|---|---|---|---|
| (Puerto Rico) 1993 Ponce | | | | | | | | | |
| (Dominican Republic) 2002 Santo Domingo | | | | | | | | | |
| (Dominican Republic) 2006 Santo Domingo | | | | | | | | | |
| (Puerto Rico) 2010 Mayagüez | | | | | | | | | |
| (Mexico) 2014 Veracruz | | | | | | | | | |
| (Colombia) 2018 Barranquilla | Gold medal game | 2nd | 5 | 3 | 0 | 2 | 120 | 130 | -10 |

=== Caribbean Handball Cup ===
- 2013 – 3rd

| Year | Round | Position | GP | W | D* | L | GS | GA |
|---|---|---|---|---|---|---|---|---|
| (Colombia) 2017 | Final | 1 | 6 | 4 | 1 | 1 | 172 | 171 |

=== Nor.Ca Championship ===
| Year | Round | Position | GP | W | D* | L | GS | GA |
|---|---|---|---|---|---|---|---|---|
| (Mexico) 2014 | Round robin | 5 | 5 | 0 | 0 | 4 | 102 | 131 |
| (Mexico) 2018 | Round robin | 3 | 5 | 2 | 1 | 2 | 143 | 152 |
| (Mexico) 2024 | Fifth place game | 6 | 6 | 1 | 0 | 5 | 134 | 175 |

=== Friendly tournaments ===
- Torneo Cuatro Naciones de Handball 2023 – 4th
