= Iceland at the 2008 Summer Olympics =

- IOC code: ISL
- NOC: National Olympic and Sports Association of Iceland
- Website: www.isi.is (in Icelandic)

in Beijing
- Competitors: 29 in 5 sports
- Flag bearers: Örn Arnarson (opening); Sigfús Sigurðsson (closing)
- Medals Ranked 70th: Gold 0 Silver 1 Bronze 0 Total 1

Summer Olympics appearances (overview)
- 1908; 1912; 1920–1932; 1936; 1948; 1952; 1956; 1960; 1964; 1968; 1972; 1976; 1980; 1984; 1988; 1992; 1996; 2000; 2004; 2008; 2012; 2016; 2020; 2024

Iceland sent a team to compete at the 2008 Summer Olympics in Beijing, People's Republic of China. With their silver medal in men's handball, they obtained their fourth olympic medal and their first team medal.

== Medalists ==
Medal	Name	Sport	Event
Silver	Iceland men's national handball team: Sturla Ásgeirsson; Arnór Atlason; Logi Eldon Geirsson; Snorri Steinn Guðjónsson; Hreiðar Guðmundsson; Róbert Gunnarsson; Björgvin Páll Gustavsson; Ásgeir Örn Hallgrímsson; Ingimundur Ingimundarson; Sverre Andreas Jakobsson; Alexander Petersson; Guðjón Valur Sigurðsson; Sigfús Sigurðsson; Ólafur Stefánsson; Bjarni Fritzson	Handball	Men's tournament

== Athletics ==
Key

- Note–Ranks given for track events are within the athlete's heat only
- Q = Qualified for the next round
- q = Qualified for the next round as a fastest loser or, in field events, by position without achieving the qualifying target
- NR = National record
- N/A = Round not applicable for the event
- Bye = Athlete not required to compete in round

Men

Athlete	Event	Qualification		Final	
Athlete	Event	Distance	Position	Distance	Position
Bergur Ingi Pétursson	Hammer throw	71.63	25	Did not advance	

Women

Athlete	Event	Qualification		Final	
Athlete	Event	Distance	Position	Distance	Position
Þórey Edda Elísdóttir	Pole vault	4.15	23	Did not advance	
Ásdís Hjálmsdóttir	Javelin throw	48.59	50	Did not advance	

== Badminton ==
Athlete	Event	Round of 64	Round of 32	Round of 16	Quarterfinal	Semifinal	Final / BM	
Athlete	Event	Opposition Score	Opposition Score	Opposition Score	Opposition Score	Opposition Score	Opposition Score	Rank
Ragna Ingólfsdóttir	Women's singles	Hirose (JPN); L 6–21, 7–19^{ret}	Did not advance					

== Handball ==
=== Men's tournament ===
Roster

The following is the Iceland roster in the men's handball tournament of the 2008 Summer Olympics.

Head coach: Guðmundur Guðmundsson

No.	Pos.	Name	Date of birth (age)	Height	App.	Goals	Club
1	GK	Björgvin Páll Gústavsson	24 May 1985 (aged 23)	1.90 m	25	1	(Germany) TV Bittenfeld
3	LB	Logi Eldon Geirsson	10 October 1982 (aged 25)	1.91 m	63	171	(Germany) TBV Lemgo
5	P	Sigfús Sigurðsson	7 May 1975 (aged 33)	1.98 m	142	301	(Iceland) Valur
6	RB	Ásgeir Örn Hallgrímsson	17 February 1984 (aged 24)	1.91 m	83	116	(Denmark) GOG Svendborg
7	LB	Arnór Atlason	23 July 1984 (aged 24)	1.91 m	58	98	(Denmark) FCK Handball
9	LB	Guðjón Valur Sigurðsson	8 August 1979 (aged 29)	1.87 m	191	885	(Germany) VfL Gummersbach
10	CB	Snorri Guðjónsson	17 October 1981 (aged 26)	1.87 m	123	401	(Denmark) GOG Svendborg
11	RB	Ólafur Stefánsson	3 July 1973 (aged 35)	1.96 m	263	1250	(Spain) BM Ciudad Real
14	LW	Sturla Ásgeirsson	20 July 1980 (aged 28)	1.86 m	6	11	(Denmark) Aarhus GF Håndbold
15	RW	Alexander Petersson	2 July 1980 (aged 28)	1.86 m	65	249	(Germany) SG Flensburg-Handewitt
16	GK	Hreiðar Guðmundsson	29 November 1980 (aged 27)	1.93 m	57	0	(Sweden) IK Sävehof
17	P	Sverre Andreas Jakobsson	8 February 1977 (aged 31)	1.96 m	44	12	(Iceland) HK Kopavogur
18	P	Róbert Gunnarsson	22 May 1980 (aged 28)	1.90 m	118	370	(Germany) VfL Gummersbach
19	LB	Ingimundur Ingimundarson	29 January 1980 (aged 28)	1.93 m	27	34	(Norway) Elverum Håndball

Group play

Team	Pld	W	D	L	GF	GA	GD	Pts	Qualification
South Korea	5	3	0	2	122	129	−7	6	Qualified for the quarterfinals
Denmark	5	2	2	1	137	131	+6	6	Qualified for the quarterfinals
Iceland	5	2	2	1	151	146	+5	6	Qualified for the quarterfinals
Russia	5	2	1	2	136	131	+5	5	Qualified for the quarterfinals
Germany	5	2	1	2	126	130	−4	5	
Egypt	5	0	2	3	127	132	−5	2	

10 August 2008; 10:45	Russia	31 – 33	Iceland	Olympic Sports Centre Gymnasium; Referees: Krstic, Ljubic (SLO)
10 August 2008; 10:45	Igropulo 9	(16–19)	Guðjónsson 12	Olympic Sports Centre Gymnasium; Referees: Krstic, Ljubic (SLO)
10 August 2008; 10:45	3× (yellow card) 6× (suspension)	Report	3× (yellow card) 3× (suspension)	Olympic Sports Centre Gymnasium; Referees: Krstic, Ljubic (SLO)

12 August 2008; 20:45	Iceland	33 – 29	Germany	Olympic Sports Centre Gymnasium; Referees: Bord, Buy (FRA)
12 August 2008; 20:45	Guðjónsson 8	(17–14)	Kraus 13	Olympic Sports Centre Gymnasium; Referees: Bord, Buy (FRA)
12 August 2008; 20:45	3× (yellow card) 2× (suspension)	Report	2× (yellow card) 5× (suspension) 1× (red card)	Olympic Sports Centre Gymnasium; Referees: Bord, Buy (FRA)

14 August 2008; 14:00	South Korea	22 – 21	Iceland	Olympic Sports Centre Gymnasium; Referees: Baum, Goralczyk (POL)
14 August 2008; 14:00	Yoon Kyung-shin 6	(10–9)	Geirsson, Sigurðsson 5	Olympic Sports Centre Gymnasium; Referees: Baum, Goralczyk (POL)
14 August 2008; 14:00	3× (yellow card) 1× (suspension)	Report	4× (yellow card) 3× (suspension)	Olympic Sports Centre Gymnasium; Referees: Baum, Goralczyk (POL)

16 August 2008; 20:45	Denmark	32 – 32	Iceland	Olympic Sports Centre Gymnasium; Referees: Canbro, Claesson (SWE)
16 August 2008; 20:45	Nøddesbo 6	(18–17)	Guðjónsson 8	Olympic Sports Centre Gymnasium; Referees: Canbro, Claesson (SWE)
16 August 2008; 20:45	3× (yellow card) 5× (suspension)	Report	2× (yellow card) 6× (suspension) 1× (red card)	Olympic Sports Centre Gymnasium; Referees: Canbro, Claesson (SWE)

18 August 2008; 09:00	Iceland	32 – 32	Egypt	Olympic Sports Centre Gymnasium; Referees: Din, Dinu (ROU)
18 August 2008; 09:00	Sigurðsson 10	(14–17)	Zaky 9	Olympic Sports Centre Gymnasium; Referees: Din, Dinu (ROU)
18 August 2008; 09:00	4× (yellow card) 4× (suspension)	Report	3× (yellow card) 6× (suspension)	Olympic Sports Centre Gymnasium; Referees: Din, Dinu (ROU)

Quarterfinal

20 August 2008; 14:15	Poland	30 – 32	Iceland	Olympic Sports Centre Gymnasium; Referees: Bord, Buy (FRA)
20 August 2008; 14:15	Jachlewski, Tkaczyk 6	(19–14)	Petersson 6	Olympic Sports Centre Gymnasium; Referees: Bord, Buy (FRA)
20 August 2008; 14:15	3× (yellow card) 8× (suspension) 1× (red card)	Report	2× (yellow card) 3× (suspension)	Olympic Sports Centre Gymnasium; Referees: Bord, Buy (FRA)

Semifinal

22 August 2008; 20:15	Iceland	36 – 30	Spain	Beijing National Indoor Stadium; Referees: Krstic, Ljubic (SLO)
22 August 2008; 20:15	Sigurðsson, Geirsson 7	(17–15)	Rocas 7	Beijing National Indoor Stadium; Referees: Krstic, Ljubic (SLO)
22 August 2008; 20:15	4× (yellow card) 9× (suspension)	Report	3× (yellow card) 5× (suspension) 1× (red card)	Beijing National Indoor Stadium; Referees: Krstic, Ljubic (SLO)

Gold medal game

24 August 2008; 15:45	Iceland	23 – 28	France	Beijing National Indoor Stadium; Referees: Lemme, Ullrich (GER)
24 August 2008; 15:45	Stefánsson 5	(10–15)	Karabatić 8	Beijing National Indoor Stadium; Referees: Lemme, Ullrich (GER)
24 August 2008; 15:45	3× (yellow card) 4× (suspension)	Report	3× (yellow card) 3× (suspension)	Beijing National Indoor Stadium; Referees: Lemme, Ullrich (GER)

Final rank

Silver

== Judo ==
Athlete	Event	Preliminary	Round of 32	Round of 16	Quarterfinals	Semifinals	Repechage 1	Repechage 2	Repechage 3	Final / BM	
Athlete	Event	Opposition Result	Opposition Result	Opposition Result	Opposition Result	Opposition Result	Opposition Result	Opposition Result	Opposition Result	Opposition Result	Rank
Þormóður Árni Jónsson	Men's +100 kg	Bye	Figueroa (PUR); W 1000–0001	Roudaki (IRI); L 0001–1000	Did not advance						

== Swimming ==
Men

Athlete	Event	Heat		Semifinal		Final	
Athlete	Event	Time	Rank	Time	Rank	Time	Rank
Árni Már Árnason	50 m freestyle	22.81 NR	44	Did not advance			
Örn Arnarson	100 m freestyle	50.68	49	Did not advance			
Örn Arnarson	100 m backstroke	56.15	35	Did not advance			
Jakob Jóhann Sveinsson	100 m breaststroke	1:02.50	47	Did not advance			
Jakob Jóhann Sveinsson	200 m breaststroke	2:15.58	38	Did not advance			
Hjörtur Már Reynisson	100 m butterfly	54.17	52	Did not advance			

Women

Athlete	Event	Heat		Semifinal		Final	
Athlete	Event	Time	Rank	Time	Rank	Time	Rank
Sarah Blake Bateman	100 m backstroke	1:03.82	41	Did not advance			
Erla Dögg Haraldsdóttir	100 m breaststroke	1:11.78	40	Did not advance			
Erla Dögg Haraldsdóttir	200 m individual medley	2:20.53	35	Did not advance			
Ragnheiður Ragnarsdóttir	50 m freestyle	25.82	36	Did not advance			
Ragnheiður Ragnarsdóttir	100 m freestyle	56.35	35	Did not advance			
Sigrún Brá Sverrisdóttir	200 m freestyle	2:04.82	45	Did not advance			
