= Iceland at the 2004 Summer Olympics =

- IOC code: ISL
- NOC: National Olympic and Sports Association of Iceland
- Website: www.isi.is (in Icelandic)

in Athens
- Competitors: 26 in 5 sports
- Flag bearer: Guðmundur Hrafnkelsson
- Medals: Gold 0 Silver 0 Bronze 0 Total 0

Summer Olympics appearances (overview)
- 1908; 1912; 1920–1932; 1936; 1948; 1952; 1956; 1960; 1964; 1968; 1972; 1976; 1980; 1984; 1988; 1992; 1996; 2000; 2004; 2008; 2012; 2016; 2020; 2024

Iceland competed at the 2004 Summer Olympics in Athens, Greece, from 13 to 29 August 2004. Icelandic athletes have competed at every Summer Olympic Games in the modern era since 1912, except for four occasions.

The National Olympic and Sports Association of Iceland sent a total of 26 athletes, 21 men and 5 women, to compete in 5 sports, including men's handball, the nation's only team-based sport at these Olympic games. Seven Icelandic athletes had previously competed in Sydney, including swimmer Örn Arnarson, who finished fourth in the men's 200 m backstroke. Handball player Guðmundur Hrafnkelsson, who competed in his third Olympics since 1988 and helped his team set a remarkable comeback to the Games after an eight-year absence, was appointed by the committee to become the nation's flag bearer in the opening ceremony.

Iceland failed to win an Olympic medal for the first time since 1996, although pole vaulter Þórey Edda Elísdóttir achieved a best result for the team at these Games with a fifth-place finish.

== Athletics ==
Icelandic athletes have so far achieved qualifying standards in the following athletics events (up to a maximum of 3 athletes in each event at the 'A' Standard, and 1 at the 'B' Standard).

Key

- Note–Ranks given for track events are within the athlete's heat only
- Q = Qualified for the next round
- q = Qualified for the next round as a fastest loser or, in field events, by position without achieving the qualifying target
- NR = National record
- N/A = Round not applicable for the event
- Bye = Athlete not required to compete in round

Men
Combined events – Decathlon

Athlete	Event	100 m	LJ	SP	HJ	400 m	110H	DT	PV	JT	1500 m	Final	Rank
Jón Arnar Magnússon	Result	11.05	7.12	14.98	DNS	—	—	—	—	—	—	DNF	
Jón Arnar Magnússon	Points	850	842	788	0	—	—	—	—	—	—	DNF	

Women
Field events

Athlete	Event	Qualification		Final	
Athlete	Event	Distance	Position	Distance	Position
Þórey Edda Elísdóttir	Pole vault	4.40	10 q	4.55	5

== Gymnastics ==
=== Artistic ===
Men

Athlete	Event	Qualification								Final							
Athlete	Event	Apparatus						Total	Rank	Apparatus						Total	Rank
Athlete	Event	F	PH	R	V	PB	HB	Total	Rank	F	PH	R	V	PB	HB	Total	Rank
Rúnar Alexandersson	All-around	8.700	9.737	9.162	8.887	9.312	9.000	54.798	35	Did not advance							
Rúnar Alexandersson	Pommel horse	—	9.737	—				9.737	=6 Q	—	9.725	—				9.725	7

== Handball ==
=== Men's tournament ===
Roster

The following is the Iceland roster in the men's handball tournament of the 2004 Summer Olympics.

Head coaches: Gudmundur Gudmundsson

No.	Pos.	Name	Date of birth (age)	Height	App.	Goals	Club
1	GK	Roland Eradze	7 May 1971 (aged 33)	1.90 m			(Iceland) Valur
2	P	Róbert Sighvatsson	13 November 1972 (aged 31)	1.91 m			(Germany) HSG Wetzlar
3	CB	Kristján Andrésson	27 March 1981 (aged 23)	1.82 m			(Sweden) Eskilstuna Guif
4	CB	Einar Örn Jónsson	28 December 1976 (aged 27)	1.83 m			(Germany) SG Wallau-Massenheim
5	P	Sigfús Sigurðsson	7 May 1975 (aged 29)	1.98 m			(Germany) SC Magdeburg
6	LB	Dagur Sigurðsson	3 April 1973 (aged 31)	1.93 m			(Austria) A1 Bregenz
8	RW	Gylfi Gylfason	22 September 1977 (aged 26)	1.77 m			(Germany) Wilhelmshavener HV
9	LW	Guðjón Valur Sigurðsson	8 August 1979 (aged 25)	1.88 m			(Germany) TUSEM Essen
10	CB	Snorri Steinn Guðjónsson	17 October 1981 (aged 22)	1.92 m			(Germany) TV Grosswallstadt
11	RB	Ólafur Stefánsson	3 July 1973 (aged 31)	1.96 m			(Spain) BM Ciudad Real
12	GK	Guðmundur Hrafnkelsson	22 January 1965 (aged 39)	1.90 m			(Germany) SG Kronau/Östringen
13	LB	Rúnar Sigtryggsson	7 April 1972 (aged 32)	1.94 m			(Germany) ThSV Eisenach
15	RB	Ásgeir Örn Hallgrímsson	17 February 1984 (aged 20)	1.90 m			(Iceland) Haukar
17	LB	Jalesky Garcia Padron	28 January 1975 (aged 29)	1.94 m			(Germany) FA Göppingen
18	P	Róbert Gunnarsson	22 May 1980 (aged 24)	1.92 m			(Denmark) Aarhus GF

Group play

Pos	Team	Pld	W	D	L	GF	GA	GD	Pts	Qualification
1	Croatia	5	5	0	0	146	129	+17	10	Quarterfinals
2	Spain	5	4	0	1	154	137	+17	8	Quarterfinals
3	South Korea	5	2	0	3	148	148	0	4 (Note: South Korea 35–32 Russia)	Quarterfinals
4	Russia	5	2	0	3	145	145	0	4	Quarterfinals
5	Iceland	5	1	0	4	143	158	−15	2 (Note: Iceland 30–25 Slovenia)	
6	Slovenia	5	1	0	4	130	149	−19	2	

Rules for classification: 1) Points; 2) Head-to-head points; 3) Head-to-head goal difference; 4) Head-to-head goals scored; 5) Goal difference; 6) Goals scored; 7) Draw.
Notes:

14 August 2004; 19:30	Croatia	34 - 30	Iceland	Sports Pavilion, Athens; Referees: Lemme, Ullrich (GER)
14 August 2004; 19:30	Metličić 8	(16-12)	Stefánsson 8	Sports Pavilion, Athens; Referees: Lemme, Ullrich (GER)
14 August 2004; 19:30	3× (yellow card) 9× (suspension)		3× (yellow card) 7× (suspension) 1× (red card)	Sports Pavilion, Athens; Referees: Lemme, Ullrich (GER)

16 August 2004; 14:30	Iceland	23 - 31	Spain	Sports Pavilion, Athens; Referees: Bord, Buy (FRA)
16 August 2004; 14:30	Stefánsson 6	(12-13)	Duyshebaev, Romero 5	Sports Pavilion, Athens; Referees: Bord, Buy (FRA)
16 August 2004; 14:30	2× (yellow card) 3× (suspension)		3× (yellow card) 3× (suspension)	Sports Pavilion, Athens; Referees: Bord, Buy (FRA)

18 August 2004; 11:30	Iceland	30 - 25	Slovenia	Sports Pavilion, Athens; Referees: Baum, Goralczyk (POL)
18 August 2004; 11:30	G. Sigurðsson 7	(10-10)	Rutenka 10	Sports Pavilion, Athens; Referees: Baum, Goralczyk (POL)
18 August 2004; 11:30	3× (yellow card) 3× (suspension)		3× (yellow card) 3× (suspension)	Sports Pavilion, Athens; Referees: Baum, Goralczyk (POL)

20 August 2004; 09:30	South Korea	34 - 30	Iceland	Sports Pavilion, Athens; Referees: Nachevski, Nachevski (MKD)
20 August 2004; 09:30	Yoon K 12	(16-13)	Stefánsson 10	Sports Pavilion, Athens; Referees: Nachevski, Nachevski (MKD)
20 August 2004; 09:30	3× (yellow card) 4× (suspension)		3× (yellow card) 3× (suspension) 1× (red card)	Sports Pavilion, Athens; Referees: Nachevski, Nachevski (MKD)

22 August 2004; 19:30	Russia	34 - 30	Iceland	Sports Pavilion, Athens; Referees: Bord, Buy (FRA)
22 August 2004; 19:30	Rastvortsev 10	(17-11)	Stefánsson 10	Sports Pavilion, Athens; Referees: Bord, Buy (FRA)
22 August 2004; 19:30	3× (yellow card) 5× (suspension)		3× (yellow card) 2× (suspension)	Sports Pavilion, Athens; Referees: Bord, Buy (FRA)

Ninth Place Final

24 August 2004; 11:30	Brazil	25 – 29	Iceland	Sports Pavilion, Athens; Referees: Hassan, Aly (EGY)
24 August 2004; 11:30	Tupan, Souza 6	(11-13)	G. Sigurðsson 8	Sports Pavilion, Athens; Referees: Hassan, Aly (EGY)
24 August 2004; 11:30	3× (yellow card) 5× (suspension) 1× (red card)		4× (yellow card) 2× (suspension)	Sports Pavilion, Athens; Referees: Hassan, Aly (EGY)

== Sailing ==
Open

Athlete	Event	Race											Net points	Final rank
Athlete	Event	1	2	3	4	5	6	7	8	9	10	M*	Net points	Final rank
Hafsteinn Geirsson	Laser	28	36	42	36	35	~~DNF~~	39	38	40	35	15	344	40

M = Medal race; OCS = On course side of the starting line; DSQ = Disqualified; DNF = Did not finish; DNS= Did not start; RDG = Redress given

== Swimming ==
Icelandic swimmers earned qualifying standards in the following events (up to a maximum of 2 swimmers in each event at the A-standard time, and 1 at the B-standard time):

Men

Athlete	Event	Heat		Semifinal		Final	
Athlete	Event	Time	Rank	Time	Rank	Time	Rank
Örn Arnarson	50 m freestyle	23.84	54	Did not advance			
Hjörtur Már Reynisson	100 m butterfly	55.12	42	Did not advance			
Jakob Jóhann Sveinsson	100 m breaststroke	1:02.97	23	Did not advance			
Jakob Jóhann Sveinsson	200 m breaststroke	2:15.60	21	Did not advance			

Women

Athlete	Event	Heat		Semifinal		Final	
Athlete	Event	Time	Rank	Time	Rank	Time	Rank
Lára Hrund Bjargardóttir	200 m individual medley	2:22.00	27	Did not advance			
Íris Edda Heimisdóttir	100 m breaststroke	1:15.35	40	Did not advance			
Kolbrún Yr Kristjánsdóttir	100 m butterfly	1:02.33	31	Did not advance			
Ragnheiður Ragnarsdóttir	50 m freestyle	26.36	31	Did not advance			
Ragnheiður Ragnarsdóttir	100 m freestyle	58.47	40	Did not advance			

== See also ==
- Iceland at the 2004 Summer Paralympics
