= Iceland at the 2012 Summer Olympics =

- IOC code: ISL
- NOC: National Olympic and Sports Association of Iceland
- Website: www.isi.is (in Icelandic)

in London
- Competitors: 28 in 6 sports
- Flag bearers: Ásdís Hjálmsdóttir (opening); Ragna Ingólfsdóttir (closing)
- Medals: Gold 0 Silver 0 Bronze 0 Total 0

Summer Olympics appearances (overview)
- 1908; 1912; 1920–1932; 1936; 1948; 1952; 1956; 1960; 1964; 1968; 1972; 1976; 1980; 1984; 1988; 1992; 1996; 2000; 2004; 2008; 2012; 2016; 2020; 2024

Iceland competed at the 2012 Summer Olympics in London, from 27 July to 12 August 2012. The nation celebrated its centennial anniversary in the Olympics, having participated at every games since 1912, except for four occasions.

The National Olympic and Sports Association of Iceland sent the nation's third largest delegation to the Games, with a total of 28 athletes, 22 men and 6 women, to compete in 6 sports, including men's handball, the nation's only team-based sport at these Olympic games. Javelin thrower and Olympic hopeful Ásdís Hjálmsdóttir was Iceland's first female flag bearer at the opening ceremony since 2000.

Iceland, however, failed to win a single Olympic medal in London, after the men's national handball team, silver medalists from Beijing, lost to Hungary in the quarterfinal round. Meanwhile, Hjálmsdóttir, who qualified for the final rounds of the women's javelin throw event, finished farther from the standings.

== Athletics ==
Icelandic athletes participated in the following events:

Key

- Note–Ranks given for track events are within the athlete's heat only
- Q = Qualified for the next round
- q = Qualified for the next round as a fastest loser or, in field events, by position without achieving the qualifying target
- NR = National record
- N/A = Round not applicable for the event
- Bye = Athlete not required to compete in round

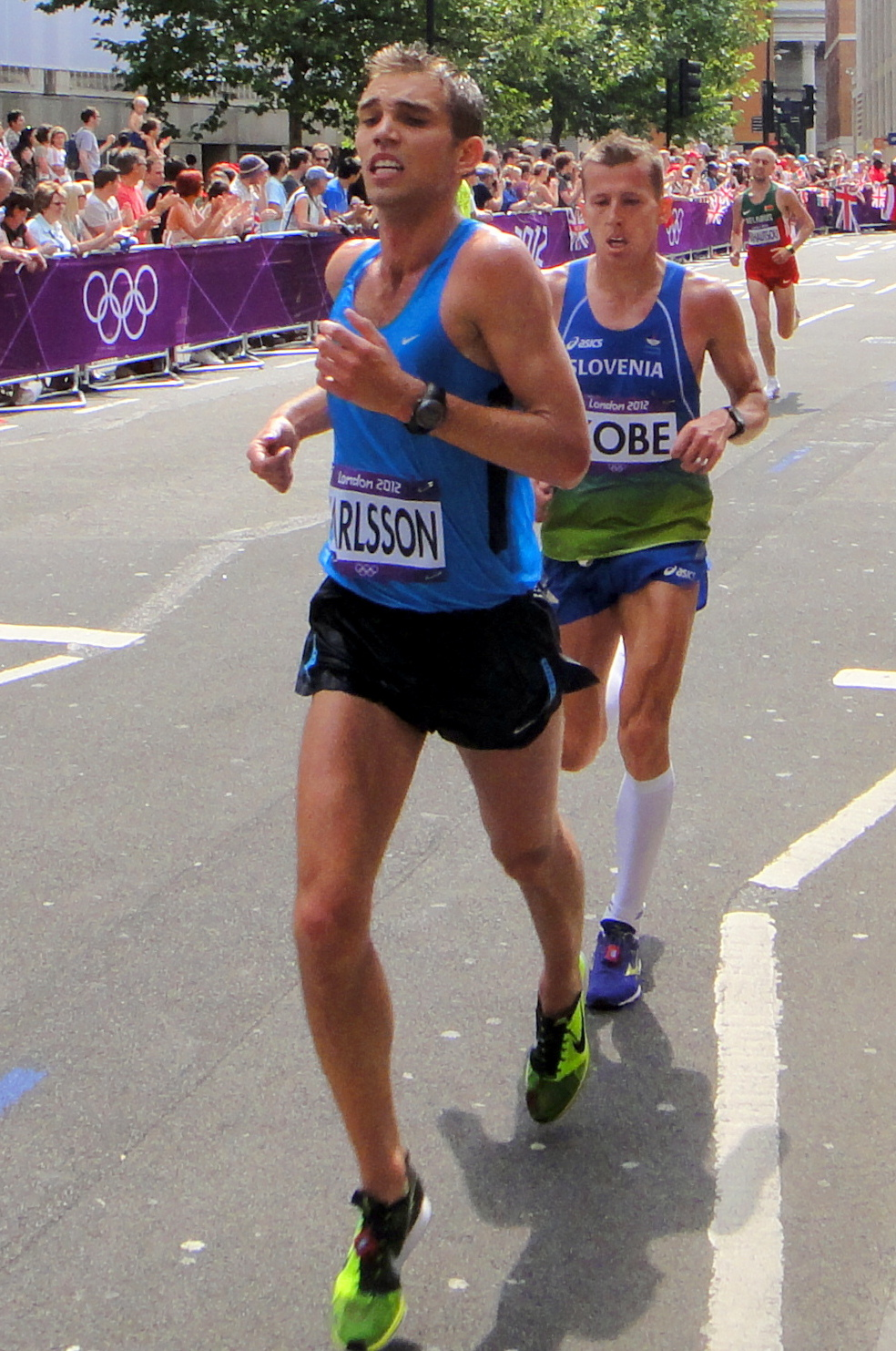
Kári Steinn Karlsson (left) finished forty-second in men's marathon.

Men
Track & road events

Athlete	Event	Final	
Athlete	Event	Result	Rank
Kári Steinn Karlsson	Marathon	2:18:47	42

Field events

Athlete	Event	Qualification		Final	
Athlete	Event	Distance	Position	Distance	Position
Óðinn Björn Þorsteinsson	Shot put	17.62	36	Did not advance	

Women
Field events

Athlete	Event	Qualification		Final	
Athlete	Event	Distance	Position	Distance	Position
Ásdís Hjálmsdóttir	Javelin throw	62.77 NR	8 Q	59.09	11

== Badminton ==
Iceland qualified one athlete in badminton.

Athlete	Event	Group Stage			Elimination	Quarterfinal	Semifinal	Final / BM	
Athlete	Event	Opposition Score	Opposition Score	Rank	Opposition Score	Opposition Score	Opposition Score	Opposition Score	Rank
Ragna Ingólfsdóttir	Women's singles	Stapušaitytė (LTU); W 21–10, 21–16	Jie Y (NED); L 12–21, 23–25	2	Did not advance				

== Handball ==
- Men's team event – 1 team of 15 players

=== Men's tournament ===
The following is the Iceland roster in the men's handball tournament of the 2012 Summer Olympics.

Head coaches: Guðmundur Guðmundsson

No.	Pos.	Name	Date of birth (age)	Height	App.	Goals	Club
1	GK	Björgvin Páll Gústavsson	24 May 1985 (aged 27)	1.90 m			(Germany) SC Magdeburg
2	P	Vignir Svavarsson	20 June 1980 (aged 32)	1.94 m			(Germany) TSV Hannover-Burgdorf
3	P	Kári Kristjánsson	23 April 1981 (aged 31)	1.98 m			(Germany) HSG Wetzlar
4	LB	Aron Pálmarsson	19 July 1990 (aged 22)	1.93 m			(Germany) THW Kiel
5	LB	Ingimundur Ingimundarson	29 January 1980 (aged 32)	1.93 m			(Iceland) Fram Reykjavik
6	RB	Ásgeir Örn Hallgrímsson	17 February 1984 (aged 28)	1.91 m			(Germany) TSV Hannover-Burgdorf
7	LB	Arnór Atlason	23 July 1984 (aged 28)	1.91 m			(Denmark) AG København
9	LW	Guðjón Valur Sigurðsson	8 August 1979 (aged 32)	1.87 m			(Denmark) AG København
10	CB	Snorri Guðjónsson	17 October 1981 (aged 30)	1.87 m			(Denmark) AG København
11	RB	Ólafur Stefánsson	3 July 1973 (aged 39)	1.96 m			(Denmark) AG København
15	RB	Alexander Petersson	2 July 1980 (aged 32)	1.86 m			(Germany) Füchse Berlin
16	GK	Hreiðar Guðmundsson	29 November 1980 (aged 31)	1.93 m			(Norway) Nøtterøy IF
17	P	Sverre Andreas Jakobsson	8 February 1977 (aged 35)	1.96 m			(Germany) TV Großwallstadt
18	P	Róbert Gunnarsson	22 May 1980 (aged 32)	1.90 m			(Germany) Rhein-Neckar Löwen

Group play

Team	Pld	W	D	L	GF	GA	GD	Pts	Qualification
Iceland	5	5	0	0	167	132	+35	10	Quarter-finals
France	5	4	0	1	159	110	+49	8	Quarter-finals
Sweden	5	3	0	2	156	115	+41	6	Quarter-finals
Tunisia	5	2	0	3	121	125	−4	4	Quarter-finals
Argentina	5	1	0	4	113	138	−25	2	
Great Britain	5	0	0	5	96	192	−96	0	

29 July 2012; 09:30	Iceland	31 – 25	Argentina	Copper Box, London; Attendance: 3,701; Referees: Geipel, Helbig (GER)
29 July 2012; 09:30	Sigurðsson 9	(15–14)	D. Simonet 5	Copper Box, London; Attendance: 3,701; Referees: Geipel, Helbig (GER)
29 July 2012; 09:30	3× (yellow card) 6× (suspension)	Report	3× (yellow card) 1× (suspension)	Copper Box, London; Attendance: 3,701; Referees: Geipel, Helbig (GER)

31 July 2012; 09:30	Tunisia	22 – 32	Iceland	Copper Box, London; Attendance: 3,559; Referees: Al-Nuaimi, Omar (UAE)
31 July 2012; 09:30	Bannour 10	(8–19)	Pálmarsson 8	Copper Box, London; Attendance: 3,559; Referees: Al-Nuaimi, Omar (UAE)
31 July 2012; 09:30	4× (yellow card) 3× (suspension)	Report	4× (yellow card) 5× (suspension)	Copper Box, London; Attendance: 3,559; Referees: Al-Nuaimi, Omar (UAE)

2 August 2012; 21:15	Sweden	32 – 33	Iceland	Copper Box, London; Attendance: 4,590; Referees: Nachevski, Nikolov (MKD)
2 August 2012; 21:15	Källman 9	(13–17)	Pálmarsson 9	Copper Box, London; Attendance: 4,590; Referees: Nachevski, Nikolov (MKD)
2 August 2012; 21:15	3× (yellow card) 3× (suspension)	Report	3× (yellow card) 8× (suspension)	Copper Box, London; Attendance: 4,590; Referees: Nachevski, Nikolov (MKD)

4 August 2012; 19:30	Iceland	30 – 29	France	Copper Box, London; Attendance: 4,521; Referees: Krstić, Ljubić (SLO)
4 August 2012; 19:30	Petersson 6	(16–15)	Fernandez 9	Copper Box, London; Attendance: 4,521; Referees: Krstić, Ljubić (SLO)
4 August 2012; 19:30	3× (yellow card) 7× (suspension)	Report	2× (yellow card) 4× (suspension)	Copper Box, London; Attendance: 4,521; Referees: Krstić, Ljubić (SLO)

6 August 2012; 16:15	Iceland	41 – 24	Great Britain	Copper Box, London; Attendance: 4,856; Referees: Abdulla, Bamutref (QAT)
6 August 2012; 16:15	Sigurðsson 8	(18–15)	Larsson 9	Copper Box, London; Attendance: 4,856; Referees: Abdulla, Bamutref (QAT)
6 August 2012; 16:15	3× (yellow card) 4× (suspension)	Report	3× (yellow card) 5× (suspension)	Copper Box, London; Attendance: 4,856; Referees: Abdulla, Bamutref (QAT)

Quarter-final

8 August 2012
11:00
Iceland
33 – 34 (ET)
Hungary
Basketball Arena, London
Attendance: 9,063
Referees: Lazaar, Reveret (FRA)
Sigurðsson 8
(12–16)
Nagy 9
3× (yellow card) 2× (suspension)
Report
3× (yellow card) 4× (suspension)

FT: 27–27 ET: 3–3, 3–4

== Judo ==
Iceland qualified 1 judoka.

Athlete	Event	Round of 32	Round of 16	Quarterfinals	Semifinals	Repechage	Final / BM	
Athlete	Event	Opposition Result	Opposition Result	Opposition Result	Opposition Result	Opposition Result	Opposition Result	Rank
Þormóður Árni Jónsson	Men's +100 kg	Silva (BRA); L 0000–0100	Did not advance					

== Shooting ==
Men

Athlete	Event	Qualification		Final	
Athlete	Event	Points	Rank	Points	Rank
Ásgeir Sigurgeirsson	10 m air pistol	580	14	Did not advance	
Ásgeir Sigurgeirsson	50 m pistol	544	32	Did not advance	

== Swimming ==
Iceland qualified the following swimmers:

Men

Athlete	Event	Heat		Semifinal		Final	
Athlete	Event	Time	Rank	Time	Rank	Time	Rank
Árni Már Árnason	50 m freestyle	22.81	31	Did not advance			
Anton Sveinn McKee	1500 m freestyle	15:29.40	25	—N/a		Did not advance	
Anton Sveinn McKee	400 m individual medley	4:25.06	31	—N/a		Did not advance	
Jakob Jóhann Sveinsson	100 m breaststroke	1:02.65	36	Did not advance			
Jakob Jóhann Sveinsson	200 m breaststroke	2:16.72	31	Did not advance			

Women

Athlete	Event	Heat		Semifinal		Final	
Athlete	Event	Time	Rank	Time	Rank	Time	Rank
Sarah Blake Bateman	50 m freestyle	25.28	=16*	Did not advance			
Sarah Blake Bateman	100 m butterfly	59.87	32	Did not advance			
Eygló Ósk Gústafsdóttir	100 m backstroke	1:02.40	32	Did not advance			
Eygló Ósk Gústafsdóttir	200 m backstroke	2:11.31	20	Did not advance			
Eygló Ósk Gústafsdóttir	200 m individual medley	2:16.81	28	Did not advance			
Hrafnhildur Lúthersdóttir	100 m breaststroke	DNS		Did not advance			
Hrafnhildur Lúthersdóttir	200 m breaststroke	2:29.60	28	Did not advance			
Sarah Blake Bateman; Eygló Ósk Gústafsdóttir; Eva Hannesdóttir; Hrafnhildur Lúthersdóttir	4 × 100 m medley relay	4:07.09	15	—N/a		Did not advance	

* Lost swim-off

== See also ==
- Iceland at the 2012 Winter Youth Olympics
