= Einar Ólafsson (handballer) =

Icelandic handball player (born 2001)

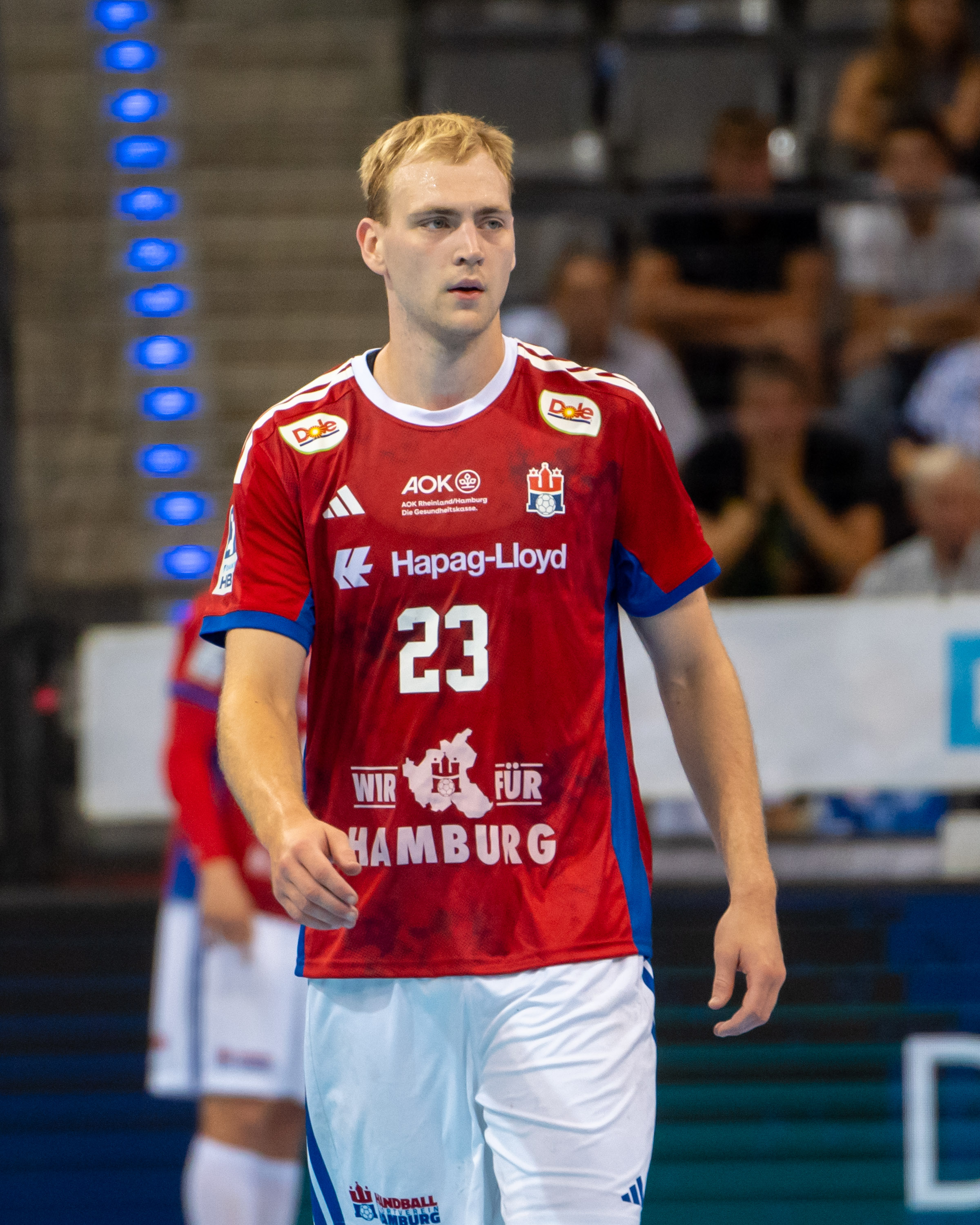

Personal information
- Full name: Einar Þorsteinn Ólafsson
- Nationality: Icelandic
- Born: 30 September 2001 (age 25) Magdeburg, Germany
- Height: 2.00 m (6 ft 7 in)

Sport
- Sport: Handball
- Position: Left back
- Current club: HSV Hamburg
- Number: 23

Youth career
- Years: Team
- –2019: Valur

Senior clubs
- Years: Team
- 2019–2022: Valur
- 2022–2025: Fredericia HK
- 2025–: HSV Hamburg
National team
Years	Team	Apps	(Gls)
2023–	Iceland	24	(7)

Einar Þorsteinn Ólafsson (born 9 September 2001) is an Icelandic handball player for Handball Sport Verein Hamburg and the Icelandic national team.

== Club career ==
Unlike many of his peers, Einar never represented Iceland at youth international level in handball and even came close to switching sports altogether, with basketball competing strongly for his attention during his teenage years. He has since credited the skills he developed through basketball as an important foundation for his defensive abilities in handball. His breakthrough came when his defensive excellence helped Valur achieve domestic success in the Icelandic men's handball league under Snorri Steinn Guðjónsson. That progress earned him a move into professional handball in Denmark with Fredericia HK in 2022, under Icelandic coach Guðmundur Guðmundsson.

== International career ==
He represented Iceland at the 2025 World Men's Handball Championship, and in the 2026 European Men's Handball Championship. At the 2026 European Championship Iceland finished fourth, losing to Denmark in the semifinal and Croatia in the third place-playoff.

== Personal life ==
His father, Ólafur Stefánsson, is a former handball player who is widely regarded as one of the best players of his generation.
