= Iceland at the 1968 Summer Olympics =

- IOC code: ISL
- NOC: Olympic Committee of Iceland

in Mexico City
- Competitors: 8 in 3 sports
- Flag bearer: Guðmundur Hermannsson
- Medals: Gold 0 Silver 0 Bronze 0 Total 0

Summer Olympics appearances (overview)
- 1908; 1912; 1920–1932; 1936; 1948; 1952; 1956; 1960; 1964; 1968; 1972; 1976; 1980; 1984; 1988; 1992; 1996; 2000; 2004; 2008; 2012; 2016; 2020; 2024

Iceland competed at the 1968 Summer Olympics in Mexico City, Mexico. It was the nation's ninth appearance at the Olympics, after debuting in 1908.

== Results by event ==
=== Athletics ===
Key

- Note – Ranks given for track events are within the athlete's heat only
- Q = Qualified for the next round
- q = Qualified for the next round as a fastest loser or, in field events, by position without achieving the qualifying target
- NR = National record
- N/A = Round not applicable for the event
- Bye = Athlete not required to compete in round

Men
Field events

Athlete	Event	Qualification		Final	
Athlete	Event	Distance	Position	Distance	Position
Jón Ólafsson	high jump	2.06	27	did not advance	
Guðmundur Hermannsson	shot put	17.35	16	did not advance	

Combined events – Decathlon

Athlete	Event	100 m	LJ	SP	HJ	400 m	110H	DT	PV	JT	1500 m	Final	Rank
Valbjörn Þorláksson	Result	11.1	6.76	12.59	1.70	53.2	—	—	—	—	—	DNF	
Valbjörn Þorláksson	Points						—	—	—	—	—	DNF	

=== Swimming ===
Men

Athlete	Event	Heat		Semifinal		Final	
Athlete	Event	Time	Rank	Time	Rank	Time	Rank
Guðmundur Gíslason	100 m freestyle	58.6	7	did not advance			
Guðmundur Gíslason	100 m butterfly	1:03.3	6	did not advance			
Guðmundur Gíslason	200 m individual medley	2:24.1	5	—N/a		did not advance	
Guðmundur Gíslason	400 m individual medley	5:20.2	7	—N/a		did not advance	
Leiknir Jónsson	100 m breaststroke	1:16.3	5	did not advance			
Leiknir Jónsson	200 m breaststroke	2:48.8	5	—N/a		did not advance	

Women

Athlete	Event	Heat		Semifinal		Final	
Athlete	Event	Time	Rank	Time	Rank	Time	Rank
Hrafnhildur Guðmundsdóttir	100 m freestyle	1:06.3	7	did not advance			
Hrafnhildur Guðmundsdóttir	200 m freestyle	2:28.5	7	—N/a		did not advance	
Hrafnhildur Guðmundsdóttir	200 m individual medley	2:44.3	5	—N/a		did not advance	
Ellen Ingvadóttir	100 m breaststroke	1:22.6	6	did not advance			
Ellen Ingvadóttir	200 m breaststroke	2:58.2	22	—N/a		did not advance	
Ellen Ingvadóttir	200 m individual medley	2:43.1	4	—N/a		did not advance	

=== Weightlifting ===
Men

Athlete	Event	Military press		Snatch		Jerk		Total	Rank
Athlete	Event	Result	Rank	Result	Rank	Result	Rank	Total	Rank
Óskar Sigurpálsson	Middle heavyweight	145.0		DQ					
