= Fritzson =

Fritzon is a surname. Notable people with the surname include:

- Bjarni Fritzson (born 1980), Icelandic handball player
- Jean-Baptiste Fritzson (born 1986), Haitian football player
- Ludvig Fritzson (born 1995), Swedish football player
