= Guðjón Guðmundsson (journalist) =

Icelandic sports journalist

Guðjón Guðmundsson (born 1954), also known as Gaupi, is an Icelandic former sports journalist. A former handballer, he was Bogdan Kowalczyk's assistant with the Icelandic national team for several years. He started his sports journalist career in 1991 with Stöð 2 when he was hired to cover handball matches. He is the father of handball coach Snorri Guðjónsson.
