= Róbert Sighvatsson =

Icelandic handball player (born 1972)

Personal information
- Nationality: Icelandic
- Born: 13 November 1972 (age 53) Iceland
- Height: 1.92 m (6 ft 4 in)

Sport
- Sport: Handball
- Position: Pivot

Senior clubs
- Years: Team
- Afturelding
- –1996: Víkingur Reykjavík
- 1996–1997: TuS Schutterwald
- 1997–2001: TSV Bayer Dormagen
- 2001–2002: HSG Düsseldorf
- 2002–2007: HSG Wetzlar
National team
Years	Team	Apps	(Gls)
–	Iceland	160	(243)

Róbert Sighvatsson (born 13 November 1972) is an Icelandic handball player who competed in the 2004 Summer Olympics.
