= Sturla Ásgeirsson =

Icelandic handball player (born 1980)

Personal information
- Nationality: Icelandic
- Born: 20 July 1980 (age 46) Reykjavík, Iceland
- Height: 1.82 m (6 ft 0 in)

Sport
- Sport: Handball
- Position: Left wing
- Current club: Valur Reykjavík

Senior clubs
- Years: Team
- 2004: ÍR Reykjavík
- 2004–2008: Aarhus GF Håndbold
- 2008–2010: HSG Düsseldorf
- 2010–2020: Valur Reykjavík
National team
Years	Team	Apps	(Gls)
–	Iceland	58	(72)
Medal record
Men's Handball
Representing Iceland
Summer Olympics
Silver medal – second place	2008 Beijing	Team competition
European Championship
Bronze medal – third place	2010 Austria	Team competition

Sturla Ásgeirsson (born 20 July 1980) is a retired Icelandic handball player, who played for Íþróttafélag Reykjavíkur in Iceland. He won a silver medal for Iceland at the 2008 Summer Olympics.
