= Gylfi (disambiguation) =

Gylfi is a mythological Norse king. Other people with Gylfi as a given name include:

- Gylfi Einarsson, Icelandic footballer
- Gylfi Gylfason, Icelandic handball player
- Gylfi Magnússon, Icelandic economist
- Gylfi Sigurðsson, Icelandic footballer
- Gylfi Zoega, Icelandic economist
- Gylfi Þorsteinsson Gíslason, Icelandic politician
- Sigurður Gylfi Magnússon, Icelandic historian
