= Iceland at the 1908 Summer Olympics =

- IOC code: ISL

in London
- Competitors: 1 in 1 sport
- Medals: Gold 0 Silver 0 Bronze 0 Total 0

Summer Olympics appearances (overview)
- 1908; 1912; 1920–1932; 1936; 1948; 1952; 1956; 1960; 1964; 1968; 1972; 1976; 1980; 1984; 1988; 1992; 1996; 2000; 2004; 2008; 2012; 2016; 2020; 2024

Iceland competed in the Summer Olympic Games for the first time at the 1908 Summer Olympics in London, United Kingdom. Olympic historians treat Iceland's results separate from those of Denmark despite Iceland's lack of independence at the time.

== Wrestling ==
Event	Place	Wrestler	Round of 32	Round of 16	Quarter- finals	Semi- finals	Final
Greco-Roman middleweight	4th	Jóhannes Jósefsson	Bye	Defeated; Orosz	Defeated; Frank	Lost to Andersson	Lost (walkover) to Andersen
