= Iceland at the 1936 Summer Olympics =

- IOC code: ISL
- NOC: Olympic Committee of Iceland

in Berlin
- Competitors: 12 in 2 sports
- Flag bearer: Kristján Vattnes
- Medals: Gold 0 Silver 0 Bronze 0 Total 0

Summer Olympics appearances (overview)
- 1908; 1912; 1920–1932; 1936; 1948; 1952; 1956; 1960; 1964; 1968; 1972; 1976; 1980; 1984; 1988; 1992; 1996; 2000; 2004; 2008; 2012; 2016; 2020; 2024

Iceland competed at the 1936 Summer Olympics in Berlin, Germany.

== Results by event ==
=== Athletics ===
Key

- Note – Ranks given for track events are within the athlete's heat only
- Q = Qualified for the next round
- q = Qualified for the next round as a fastest loser or, in field events, by position without achieving the qualifying target
- NR = National record
- N/A = Round not applicable for the event
- Bye = Athlete not required to compete in round

Men
Track & road events

Athlete	Event	Heat		Quarterfinals		Semifinal		Final	
Athlete	Event	Result	Rank	Result	Rank	Result	Rank	Result	Rank
Sveinn Ingvarsson	100 m		5	Did not advance					

Field events

Athlete	Event	Qualification		Final	
Athlete	Event	Distance	Position	Distance	Position
Sigurður Sigurðsson	Triple jump			13.58	22
Sigurður Sigurðsson	High jump	1.80	23	Did not advance	
Kristján Vattnes	Javelin throw	52.0	22	Did not advance	

Combined events – Decathlon

Athlete	Event	100 m	LJ	SP	HJ	400 m	110H	DT	PV	JT	1500 m	Final	Rank
Karl Vilmundarson	Result	12.6	5.06	—	—	—	—	—	—	—	—	—	DNF
Karl Vilmundarson	Points	495	472	—	—	—	—	—	—	—	—	—	DNF

=== Water polo ===
- Men (8 athletes)
