= Iceland at the 2020 Summer Olympics =

- IOC code: ISL
- NOC: National Olympic and Sports Association of Iceland
- Website: www.isi.is (in Icelandic)

in Tokyo, Japan 23 July 2021 – 8 August 2021
- Competitors: 4 in 3 sports
- Flag bearers (opening): Snæfríður Jórunnardóttir; Anton McKee
- Flag bearer (closing): N/A
- Medals: Gold 0 Silver 0 Bronze 0 Total 0

Summer Olympics appearances (overview)
- 1908; 1912; 1920–1932; 1936; 1948; 1952; 1956; 1960; 1964; 1968; 1972; 1976; 1980; 1984; 1988; 1992; 1996; 2000; 2004; 2008; 2012; 2016; 2020; 2024

Iceland competed at the 2020 Summer Olympics in Tokyo. Originally scheduled to take place from 24 July to 9 August 2020, the Games were postponed to 23 July to 8 August 2021, because of the COVID-19 pandemic.

Since the nation's official debut in 1912, Icelandic athletes have appeared in every edition of the Summer Olympic Games, except for four occasions as a result of the worldwide Great Depression (1920 to 1932). During the opening ceremony countries marched in the order of traditional Japanese characters using Gojūon script; therefore, Iceland was third in the parade of nations following Greece, which has traditionally led the march since 1928, and Refugee Olympic Team.

== Competitors ==
The following is the list of number of competitors participating in the Games:

Sport	Men	Women	Total
Athletics	1	0	1
Shooting	1	0	1
Swimming	1	1	2
Total	3	1	4

== Athletics ==
Iceland received one universality slot from World Athletics to send one athlete.

Key

- Note–Ranks given for track events are within the athlete's heat only
- Q = Qualified for the next round
- q = Qualified for the next round as a fastest loser or, in field events, by position without achieving the qualifying target
- NR = National record
- N/A = Round not applicable for the event
- Bye = Athlete not required to compete in round

Field events

Athlete	Event	Qualification		Final	
Athlete	Event	Distance	Position	Distance	Position
Guðni Valur Guðnason	Men's discus throw	NM	—	Did not advance	

== Shooting ==
Iceland received the allocation spot from ISSF to send Ásgeir Sigurgeirsson in the men's pistol shooting to the Olympics, as long as the minimum qualifying score (MQS) was fulfilled.

Athlete	Event	Qualification		Final	
Athlete	Event	Points	Rank	Points	Rank
Ásgeir Sigurgeirsson	Men's 10 m air pistol	570	28	Did not advance	

== Swimming ==
Icelandic swimmers further achieved qualifying standards in the following events (up to a maximum of 2 swimmers in each event at the Olympic Qualifying Time (OQT), and potentially 1 at the Olympic Selection Time (OST)):

Athlete	Event	Heat		Semifinal		Final	
Athlete	Event	Time	Rank	Time	Rank	Time	Rank
Anton Sveinn McKee	Men's 200 m breaststroke	2:11.64	24	Did not advance			
Snæfríður Jórunnardóttir	Women's 100 m freestyle	56.15	34	Did not advance			
Snæfríður Jórunnardóttir	Women's 200 m freestyle	2:00.20	22	Did not advance			
