= Iceland at the 2016 Summer Olympics =

- IOC code: ISL
- NOC: National Olympic and Sports Association of Iceland
- Website: www.isi.is (in Icelandic)

in Rio de Janeiro
- Competitors: 8 in 4 sports
- Flag bearer: Þormóður Jónsson
- Medals: Gold 0 Silver 0 Bronze 0 Total 0

Summer Olympics appearances (overview)
- 1908; 1912; 1920–1932; 1936; 1948; 1952; 1956; 1960; 1964; 1968; 1972; 1976; 1980; 1984; 1988; 1992; 1996; 2000; 2004; 2008; 2012; 2016; 2020; 2024

Iceland competed at the 2016 Summer Olympics in Rio de Janeiro, Brazil, from 5 to 21 August 2016. Since the nation's official debut in 1912, Icelandic athletes have appeared in every edition of the Summer Olympic Games, except for four occasions as a result of the worldwide Great Depression (1920 to 1932).

Due to the absence of the men's handball team, the National Olympic and Sports Association of Iceland sent the nation's smallest delegation to the Games for the first time since the 1968 Summer Olympics in Mexico City. A total of eight athletes, three men and five women, were selected to the Icelandic team, competing only in athletics, judo, swimming, and artistic gymnastics. Attending his third straight Olympics, heavyweight judoka Þormóður Jónsson had been chosen by the committee to carry the Icelandic flag in the opening ceremony. Along with Jónsson, four other athletes also returned for their second Olympic appearance, including javelin thrower Ásdís Hjálmsdóttir, top 12 finalist from London 2012, and swimmers Anton Sveinn McKee, Eygló Ósk Gústafsdóttir, and Hrafnhildur Lúthersdóttir.

Iceland, however, failed to win a single Olympic medal, since the 2008 Summer Olympics in Beijing, where the men's handball squad took the silver in a final match against France. Swimmers Lúthersdóttir (women's 100 m breaststroke) and Gústafsdóttir (women's 200 m backstroke) were the only Icelandic athletes progressing further to the final round for the first time since Örn Arnarson (men's 200 m backstroke) did so in 2000, but both of them finished off the podium.

== Athletics ==
Icelandic athletes have so far achieved qualifying standards in the following athletics events (up to a maximum of 3 athletes in each event):

Key

- Note–Ranks given for track events are within the athlete's heat only
- Q = Qualified for the next round
- q = Qualified for the next round as a fastest loser or, in field events, by position without achieving the qualifying target
- NR = National record
- N/A = Round not applicable for the event
- Bye = Athlete not required to compete in round

Track & road events

Athlete	Event	Heat		Semifinal		Final	
Athlete	Event	Result	Rank	Result	Rank	Result	Rank
Aníta Hinriksdóttir	Women's 800 m	2:00.14 NR	6	did not advance			

Field events

Athlete	Event	Qualification		Final	
Athlete	Event	Distance	Position	Distance	Position
Guðni Valur Guðnason	Men's discus throw	60.45	21	did not advance	
Ásdís Hjálmsdóttir	Women's javelin throw	54.92	30	did not advance	

== Gymnastics ==
=== Artistic ===
Iceland has entered one artistic gymnast into the Olympic competition, signifying the nation's sporting comeback after a 12-year hiatus. Russian-born Irina Sazonova became the first Icelandic female to book an Olympic spot in the apparatus and all-around events at the Olympic Test Event in Rio de Janeiro.

Women

Athlete	Event	Qualification						Final					
Athlete	Event	Apparatus				Total	Rank	Apparatus				Total	Rank
Athlete	Event	V	UB	BB	F	Total	Rank	V	UB	BB	F	Total	Rank
Irina Sazonova	All-around	13.800	13.500	12.900	13.000	53.200	40	did not advance					

== Judo ==
Iceland has qualified one judoka for the men's heavyweight category (+100 kg) at the Games. Þormóður Jónsson earned a continental quota spot from the European region, as the highest-ranked Icelandic judoka outside of direct qualifying position in the IJF World Ranking List of May 30, 2016.

Athlete	Event	Round of 32	Round of 16	Quarterfinals	Semifinals	Repechage	Final / BM	
Athlete	Event	Opposition Result	Opposition Result	Opposition Result	Opposition Result	Opposition Result	Opposition Result	Rank
Þormóður Jónsson	Men's +100 kg	Sarnacki (POL); L 000–100	did not advance					

== Swimming ==
Icelandic swimmers have so far achieved qualifying standards in the following events (up to a maximum of 2 swimmers in each event at the Olympic Qualifying Time (OQT), and potentially 1 at the Olympic Selection Time (OST)):

Athlete	Event	Heat		Semifinal		Final	
Athlete	Event	Time	Rank	Time	Rank	Time	Rank
Anton Sveinn McKee	Men's 100 m breaststroke	1:01.84	35	did not advance			
Anton Sveinn McKee	Men's 200 m breaststroke	2:11.39	18	did not advance			
Eygló Ósk Gústafsdóttir	Women's 100 m backstroke	1:00.89	16 Q	1:00.65	14	did not advance	
Eygló Ósk Gústafsdóttir	Women's 200 m backstroke	2:09.62	12 Q	2:08.84 NR	=7 Q	2:09.44	8
Hrafnhildur Lúthersdóttir	Women's 100 m breaststroke	1:06.81	9 Q	1:06.71	7 Q	1:07.18	6
Hrafnhildur Lúthersdóttir	Women's 200 m breaststroke	2:24.43	10 Q	2:24.41	11	did not advance	
