= Viðar Símonarson =

Icelandic handball player (born 1945)

Personal information
- Nationality: Icelandic
- Born: 25 February 1945 (age 81)
- Height: 182 cm (72 in)

Sport
- Sport: Handball
- Current club: Retired
National team
Years	Team	Apps	(Gls)
–	Iceland	93	(121)

Viðar Símonarson (born 25 February 1945) is an Icelandic former handball player who competed in the 1972 Summer Olympics.

He then have been coach of the Iceland men's national handball team from 1975 to 1976
