= Iceland at the 2024 Summer Olympics =

- IOC code: ISL
- NOC: National Olympic and Sports Association of Iceland
- Website: www.isi.is (in Icelandic)

in Paris, France 26 July 2024 – 11 August 2024
- Competitors: 5 (2 men and 3 women) in 4 sports
- Flag bearer (opening): Hákon Svavarsson & Edda Hannesdóttir
- Flag bearer (closing): Erna Sóley Gunnarsdóttir
- Medals: Gold 0 Silver 0 Bronze 0 Total 0

Summer Olympics appearances (overview)
- 1908; 1912; 1920–1932; 1936; 1948; 1952; 1956; 1960; 1964; 1968; 1972; 1976; 1980; 1984; 1988; 1992; 1996; 2000; 2004; 2008; 2012; 2016; 2020; 2024

Iceland competed at the 2024 Summer Olympics in Paris, France from 26 July to 11 August 2024. It signified the nation's participation at every single edition of the summer Olympics since the official debut in 1912, except for four occasions as a result of the worldwide Great Depression (1920 to 1932).

== Competitors ==
Sport	Men	Women	Total
Athletics	0	1	1
Shooting	1	0	1
Swimming	1	1	2
Triathlon	0	1	1
Total	2	3	5

== Athletics ==
Icelandic track and field athletes achieved the entry standards for Paris 2024 by world ranking, in the following events (a maximum of 3 athletes each):

Key

- Note–Ranks given for track events are within the athlete's heat only
- Q = Qualified for the next round
- q = Qualified for the next round as the fastest loser or, in field events, by position without achieving the qualifying target
- NR = National record
- N/A = Round not applicable for the event
- Bye = Athlete not required to compete in round

Field events

Athlete	Event	Qualification		Final	
Athlete	Event	Result	Rank	Result	Rank
Erna Sóley Gunnarsdóttir	Women's shot put	17.39	20	Did not advance	

== Shooting ==
Icelandic shooters achieved one quota places for Paris 2024 based on the allocations of universality spots.

Athlete	Event	Qualification		Semi-final		Final	
Athlete	Event	Points	Rank	Points	Rank	Points	Rank
Hákon Svavarsson	Men's skeet	116	23	Did not advance			

== Swimming ==
Icelandic swimmers achieved entry standards in the following events for Paris 2024 (a maximum of two swimmers under the Olympic Qualifying Time (OST) and potentially at the Olympic Consideration Time (OCT)) and universality places:

Athlete	Event	Heat		Semifinal		Final	
Athlete	Event	Time	Rank	Time	Rank	Time	Rank
Anton McKee	Men's 100 m breaststroke	1:00.62	25	Did not advance			
Anton McKee	Men's 200 m breaststroke	2:10.36	9 Q	2:10.42	15	Did not advance	
Snæfríður Jórunnardóttir	Women's 100 m freestyle	54.85	19	Did not advance			
Snæfríður Jórunnardóttir	Women's 200 m freestyle	1:58.32	15 Q	1:58.78	15	Did not advance	

== Triathlon ==
Iceland entered one female triathlete, marking the country's debut in the sport. Edda Hannesdóttir qualified for the games after receiving the tripartite commission quota.

Individual

Athlete	Event	Time						Rank
Athlete	Event	Swim (1.5 km)	Trans 1	Bike (40 km)	Trans 2	Run (10 km)	Total	Rank
Edda Hannesdóttir	Women's	24:49	0:59	1:03:25	0:38	40:55	2:10:46	51

== See also ==
- Iceland at the 2024 Winter Youth Olympics
