= Iceland at the 1964 Summer Olympics =

- IOC code: ISL (ICE used at these Games)
- NOC: Olympic Committee of Iceland

in Tokyo
- Competitors: 4 in 2 sports
- Flag bearer: Valbjörn Þorláksson
- Medals: Gold 0 Silver 0 Bronze 0 Total 0

Summer Olympics appearances (overview)
- 1908; 1912; 1920–1932; 1936; 1948; 1952; 1956; 1960; 1964; 1968; 1972; 1976; 1980; 1984; 1988; 1992; 1996; 2000; 2004; 2008; 2012; 2016; 2020; 2024

Iceland competed at the 1964 Summer Olympics in Tokyo, Japan. The Games were hosted from October 11, 1964, to October 24, 1964.

== Athletics ==
Key

- Note–Ranks given for track events are within the athlete's heat only
- Q = Qualified for the next round
- q = Qualified for the next round as a fastest loser or, in field events, by position without achieving the qualifying target
- NR = National record
- N/A = Round not applicable for the event
- Bye = Athlete not required to compete in round

Men
Field events

Athlete	Event	Qualification		Final	
Athlete	Event	Distance	Position	Distance	Position
Jón Ólafsson	High jump	2.00	25	did not advance	
Valbjörn Þorláksson	pole vault	DNS		did not advance	

Combined events – Decathlon

Athlete	Event	100 m	LJ	SP	HJ	400 m	110H	DT	PV	JT	1500 m	Final	Rank
Valbjörn Þorláksson	Result	11.1	6.43	13.10	1.81	50.1	15.6	39.70	4.40	56.19	5:00.6	7135	12
Valbjörn Þorláksson	Points	780	699	671	689	801	787	680	909	714	405	7135	12

== Swimming ==
Men

Athlete	Event	Heat		Semifinal		Final	
Athlete	Event	Time	Rank	Time	Rank	Time	Rank
Guðmundur Gíslason	100 m freestyle	59.0	=57	Did not advance			
Guðmundur Gíslason	400 m individual medley	5:15.5	22	—N/a		Did not advance	

Women

Athlete	Event	Heat		Semifinal		Final	
Athlete	Event	Time	Rank	Time	Rank	Time	Rank
Hrafnhildur Guðmundsdóttir	100 m freestyle	1:06.4	=36	did not advance			
