= Iceland at the 1956 Summer Olympics =

- IOC code: ISL
- NOC: Olympic Committee of Iceland

in Melbourne/Stockholm
- Competitors: 2 in 1 sport
- Flag bearer: Vilhjálmur Einarsson
- Medals Ranked 31st: Gold 0 Silver 1 Bronze 0 Total 1

Summer Olympics appearances (overview)
- 1908; 1912; 1920–1932; 1936; 1948; 1952; 1956; 1960; 1964; 1968; 1972; 1976; 1980; 1984; 1988; 1992; 1996; 2000; 2004; 2008; 2012; 2016; 2020; 2024

Iceland competed at the 1956 Summer Olympics in Melbourne, Australia. As a partial support to the Dutch-led boycott, Icelandic athletes under the Olympic flag instead of the national flag. Vilhjálmur Einarsson won the first ever Olympic medal for his country.

== Medalists ==
Medal	Name	Sport	Event	Date
Silver	Vilhjálmur Einarsson	Athletics	Men's triple jump	27 November

== Results by event ==
=== Athletics ===
Key

- Note – Ranks given for track events are within the athlete's heat only
- Q = Qualified for the next round
- q = Qualified for the next round as a fastest loser or, in field events, by position without achieving the qualifying target
- NR = National record
- N/A = Round not applicable for the event
- Bye = Athlete not required to compete in round

Men
Track & road events

Athlete	Event	Heat		Quarterfinals		Semifinal		Final	
Athlete	Event	Result	Rank	Result	Rank	Result	Rank	Result	Rank
Hilmar Þorbjörnsson	100 m	11.12	3	did not advance					

Field events

Athlete	Event	Final	
Athlete	Event	Distance	Position
Vilhjálmur Einarsson	Men's triple jump	16.26 m	2nd place, silver medalist(s)
