= Iceland at the 1976 Summer Olympics =

- IOC code: ISL
- NOC: Olympic Committee of Iceland

in Montreal
- Competitors: 13 in 4 sports
- Flag bearer: Óskar Jakobsson
- Medals: Gold 0 Silver 0 Bronze 0 Total 0

Summer Olympics appearances (overview)
- 1908; 1912; 1920–1932; 1936; 1948; 1952; 1956; 1960; 1964; 1968; 1972; 1976; 1980; 1984; 1988; 1992; 1996; 2000; 2004; 2008; 2012; 2016; 2020; 2024

Iceland competed at the 1976 Summer Olympics in Montreal, Quebec, Canada.

== Results by event ==
=== Athletics ===
Key

- Note – Ranks given for track events are within the athlete's heat only
- Q = Qualified for the next round
- q = Qualified for the next round as a fastest loser or, in field events, by position without achieving the qualifying target
- NR = National record
- N/A = Round not applicable for the event
- Bye = Athlete not required to compete in round

Men
Track & road events

| Athlete | Event | Heat | | Quarterfinals | | Semifinal | | Final | |
| Athlete | Event | Result | Rank | Result | Rank | Result | Rank | Result | Rank |
|---|---|---|---|---|---|---|---|---|---|
| Bjarni Stefánsson | 100 m | 11.28 | 6 | did not advance | | | | | |
| Bjarni Stefánsson | 400 m | 48.34 | 7 | did not advance | | | | | |
| Ágúst Ásgeirsson | 1500 m | 3:45.47 | 7 | —N/a | | did not advance | | | |
| Ágúst Ásgeirsson | 3000 m steeplechase | 8:53.95 | 11 | —N/a | | | | did not advance | |

Field events

| Athlete | Event | Qualification | | Final | |
| Athlete | Event | Distance | Position | Distance | Position |
|---|---|---|---|---|---|
| Hreinn Halldórsson | shot put | 18.93 | 15 | did not advance | |
| Óskar Jakobsson | javelin throw | 72.78 | 21 | did not advance | |

Combined events – Decathlon

| Athlete | Event | 100 m | LJ | SP | HJ | 400 m | 110H | DT | PV | JT | 1500 m | Final | Rank |
|---|---|---|---|---|---|---|---|---|---|---|---|---|---|
| Elías Sveinsson | Result | 11.51 | 6.37 | 13.94 | 1.94 | 51.77 | 16.19 | 41.98 | — | — | — | DNF | |
| Elías Sveinsson | Points | 685 | 686 | 724 | 804 | 728 | 731 | 724 | — | — | — | DNF | |

Women
Track & road events

| Athlete | Event | Heat | | Semifinal | | Final | |
| Athlete | Event | Result | Rank | Result | Rank | Result | Rank |
|---|---|---|---|---|---|---|---|
| Lilja Guðmundsdóttir | 800 m | 2:07.26 | 7 | did not advance | | | |
| Lilja Guðmundsdóttir | 1500 m | 4:20.27 | 9 | did not advance | | | |

Field events

| Athlete | Event | Qualification | | Final | |
| Athlete | Event | Distance | Position | Distance | Position |
|---|---|---|---|---|---|
| Disa Gísladóttir | high jump | NM | | did not advance | |

=== Judo ===
- Viðar Guðjohnsen - Men's 80 kg
- Gísli Þorsteinsson - Men's 93 kg

=== Swimming ===
Men

| Athlete | Event | Heat | | Semifinal | | Final | |
| Athlete | Event | Time | Rank | Time | Rank | Time | Rank |
|---|---|---|---|---|---|---|---|
| Sigurður Ólafsson | 100 m freestyle | 56.01 | 8 | did not advance | | | |
| Sigurður Ólafsson | 200 m freestyle | 2:01.18 | 6 | —N/a | | did not advance | |
| Sigurður Ólafsson | 400 m freestyle | 4:18.11 | 6 | —N/a | | did not advance | |
| Sigurður Ólafsson | 1500 m freestyle | 17:25.10 | 7 | —N/a | | did not advance | |

Women

| Athlete | Event | Heat | | Semifinal | | Final | |
| Athlete | Event | Time | Rank | Time | Rank | Time | Rank |
|---|---|---|---|---|---|---|---|
| Vilborg Sverrisdóttir | 100 m freestyle | 1:03.26 | 7 | did not advance | | | |
| Vilborg Sverrisdóttir | 200 m freestyle | 2:14.27 | 6 | —N/a | | did not advance | |
| Vilborg Sverrisdóttir | 400 m freestyle | 4:48.28 | 7 | —N/a | | did not advance | |
| Þórunn Alfreðsdóttir | 100 m butterfly | 1:09.63 | 6 | did not advance | | | |
| Þórunn Alfreðsdóttir | 200 m butterfly | 2:29.22 | 7 | —N/a | | did not advance | |

=== Weightlifting ===
Men

| Athlete | Event | Snatch | | Clean & Jerk | | Total | Rank |
| Athlete | Event | Result | Rank | Result | Rank | Total | Rank |
|---|---|---|---|---|---|---|---|
| Guðmundur Sigurðsson | 90 kg | 145.0 | 12 | 187.5 | 7 | 332.5 | 8 |
