= Gylfi Gylfason =

Icelandic handball player (born 1977)

Personal information
- Nationality: Icelandic
- Born: 22 September 1977 (age 49) Reykjavík, Iceland
- Height: 178 cm (70 in)

Sport
- Sport: Handball
- Position: Right Wing
- Current club: Retired

Youth career
- Years: Team
- 1987: Grótta KR

Senior clubs
- Years: Team
- -1999: Grótta KR
- 1999-2000: Haukar Hafnarfjörður
- 2000-2002: HSG Düsseldorf (Germany)
- 2002-2008: Wilhelmshavener HV (Germany)
- 2008-2011: GWD Minden (Germany)
- 2011-: Haukar Hafnarfjörður
National team
Years	Team	Apps	(Gls)
–	Iceland	27	(31)

Gylfi Gylfason (born 22 September 1977) is an Icelandic handball player who competed in the 2004 Summer Olympics.
