= Iceland at the 1996 Summer Olympics =

- IOC code: ISL
- NOC: Olympic Committee of Iceland

in Atlanta
- Competitors: 9 (5 men and 4 women) in 5 sports
- Flag bearer: Jón Arnar Magnússon
- Medals: Gold 0 Silver 0 Bronze 0 Total 0

Summer Olympics appearances (overview)
- 1908; 1912; 1920–1932; 1936; 1948; 1952; 1956; 1960; 1964; 1968; 1972; 1976; 1980; 1984; 1988; 1992; 1996; 2000; 2004; 2008; 2012; 2016; 2020; 2024

Iceland competed at the 1996 Summer Olympics in Atlanta, United States.

== Results by event ==
=== Athletics ===
Key

- Note – Ranks given for track events are within the athlete's heat only
- Q = Qualified for the next round
- q = Qualified for the next round as a fastest loser or, in field events, by position without achieving the qualifying target
- NR = National record
- N/A = Round not applicable for the event
- Bye = Athlete not required to compete in round

Men
Field events

Athlete	Event	Qualification		Final	
Athlete	Event	Distance	Position	Distance	Position
Vésteinn Hafsteinsson	Discus throw	56.30		did not advance	

Women
Track & road events

Athlete	Event	Heat		Semifinal		Final	
Athlete	Event	Result	Rank	Result	Rank	Result	Rank
Guðrún Arnardóttir	400 m hurdles	54.88		54.81		did not advance	

Combined events – Decathlon

Athlete	Event	100 m	LJ	SP	HJ	400 m	110H	DT	PV	JT	1500 m	Final	Rank
Jón Arnar Magnússon	Result	10.67	7.28	15.52	1.95	47.17	14.22	43.78	4.80	61.10	4:46.97	8274	12
Jón Arnar Magnússon	Points												

=== Badminton ===
Athlete	Event	Round of 64	Round of 32	Round of 16	Quarterfinal	Semifinal	Final / BM	
Athlete	Event	Opposition Score	Opposition Score	Opposition Score	Opposition Score	Opposition Score	Opposition Score	Rank
Elsa Nielsen	Women's singles	Jaroensiri (THA); L	did not advance					

=== Gymnastics ===
Men's artistic individual all-around

- Rúnar Alexandersson (68th place)

=== Judo ===
Athlete	Event	Round of 32	Round of 16	Quarterfinals	Semifinals	Repechage 1	Repechage 2	Repechage 3	Final / BM	
Athlete	Event	Opposition Result	Opposition Result	Opposition Result	Opposition Result	Opposition Result	Opposition Result	Opposition Result	Opposition Result	Rank
Vernharð Þorleifsson	Men's 95 kg	Kim (KOR); L	did not advance			Sergeyev (RUS); L	did not advance			

=== Swimming ===
Men

Athlete	Event	Heat		Semifinal		Final	
Athlete	Event	Time	Rank	Time	Rank	Time	Rank
Logi Kristjánsson	100 m backstroke	58.53	44	did not advance			

Women

Athlete	Event	Heat		Semifinal		Final	
Athlete	Event	Time	Rank	Time	Rank	Time	Rank
Elín Sigurðardóttir	50 m freestyle	26.90	37	did not advance			
Eydís Konráðsdóttir	100 m butterfly	1:03.41	28	did not advance			
