= Bjarni Fritzson =

Icelandic handball player (born 1980)

Personal information
- Nationality: Icelandic
- Born: 12 September 1980 (age 46) Reykjavík, Iceland
- Height: 189 cm (74 in)

Sport
- Sport: Handball
- Position: Right Wing

Senior clubs
- Years: Team
- 1997–2005: ÍR Reykjavík
- 2005–2007: US Créteil
- 2007–2009: Saint-Raphaël VHB
National team
Years	Team	Apps	(Gls)
–	Iceland	42	(43)
Medal record
Representing Iceland
Men's Handball
Summer Olympics
Silver medal – second place	2008 Beijing	Team competition
- Updated on January 2013

Bjarni Fritzson (born 12 September 1980) is an Icelandic handball player who in 2008 played for Saint-Raphaël, Var handball in France. He was a reserve player on the men's handball team for Iceland at the 2008 Summer Olympics, where he won a silver medal. He also represented Iceland at the 2011 World Men's Handball Championship.
