= Guðmundur Hermannsson =

Icelandic athlete (1925–2003)

Personal information
- Nationality: Icelandic
- Born: 28 July 1925 Ísafjörður, Iceland
- Died: 15 June 2003 (aged 77)

Sport
- Sport: Athletics
- Event: Shot put

Guðmundur Hermannsson (28 July 1925 – 15 June 2003) was an Icelandic athlete. He competed in the men's shot put at the 1968 Summer Olympics. In 1967 he was named the Icelandic Sportsperson of the Year.
