= Vignir Svavarsson =

Icelandic handball player (born 1980)

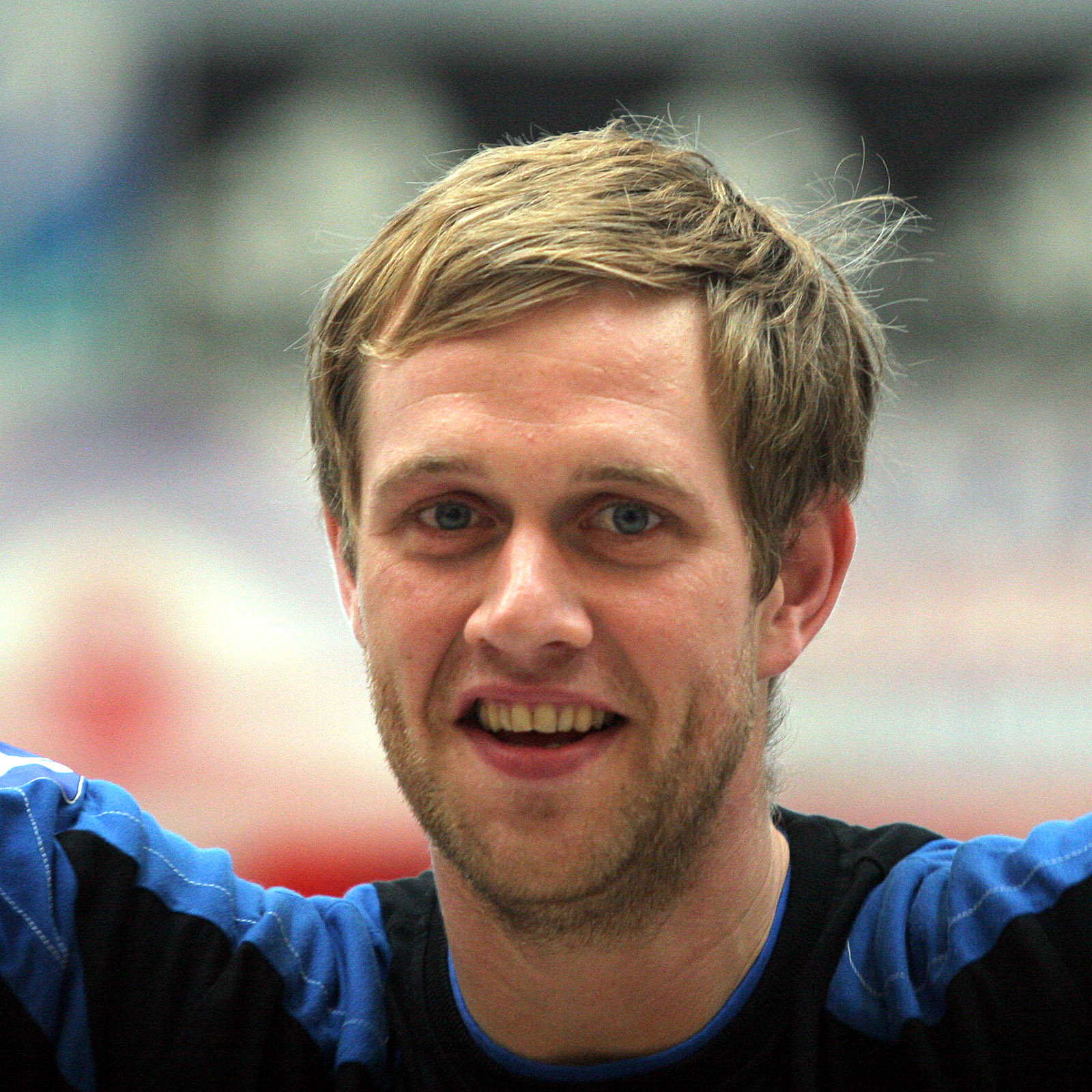

Personal information
- Nationality: Icelandic
- Born: 20 June 1980 (age 46) Reykjavík, Iceland
- Height: 1.94 m (6 ft 4 in)

Sport
- Sport: Handball
- Position: Pivot

Senior clubs
- Years: Team
- 2000–2005: Haukar
- 2005–2008: Skjern Håndbold
- 2008–2010: TBV Lemgo
- 2010–2012: TSV Hannover-Burgdorf
- 2012–2014: GWD Minden
- 2014–2016: HC Midtjylland
- 2016–2019: TTH Holstebro
- 2019–2020: Haukar
National team
Years	Team	Apps	(Gls)
2000–2016	Iceland	234	(261)
Medal record
European Championship
Bronze medal – third place	2010 Austria

Vignir Svavarsson (born 20 June 1980) is an Icelandic retired professional handballer.

== Club career ==
He enjoyed his very long playing career which started in 2000. In 2005 he left Iceland to join the Danish club Skjern Håndbold. He has subsequently played for TBV Lemgo, TSV Hannover-Burgdorf and GWD Minden in the German Bundesliga and HC Midtjylland and TTH Holstebro in the Danish league and concluded his handballing career in Haukar. He was a player for many years of Iceland national team, captained them for Euro 2016.

In July 2019, Svavarsson has signed a one-season contract until 2020 with the Icelandic top club, Haukar. There he started this professional career. This team has won the Icelandic Championship 11 times and participated in the EHF Champions League group phase 4 times. After season, Svavarsson ended his 20-year career.

== International career ==
Vignir Svavarsson had a long career with Icelandic national team. He has played 234 caps during 16 years period until 2016, which he retired from international handball. Svavarsson is eleventh most capped nation player. He won a bronze medal at the European Championship 2010 in Austria. During his international career, he was selected for 4 European and 2 World Championships.
