= Alexander Petersson =

Icelandic handball player (born 1980)

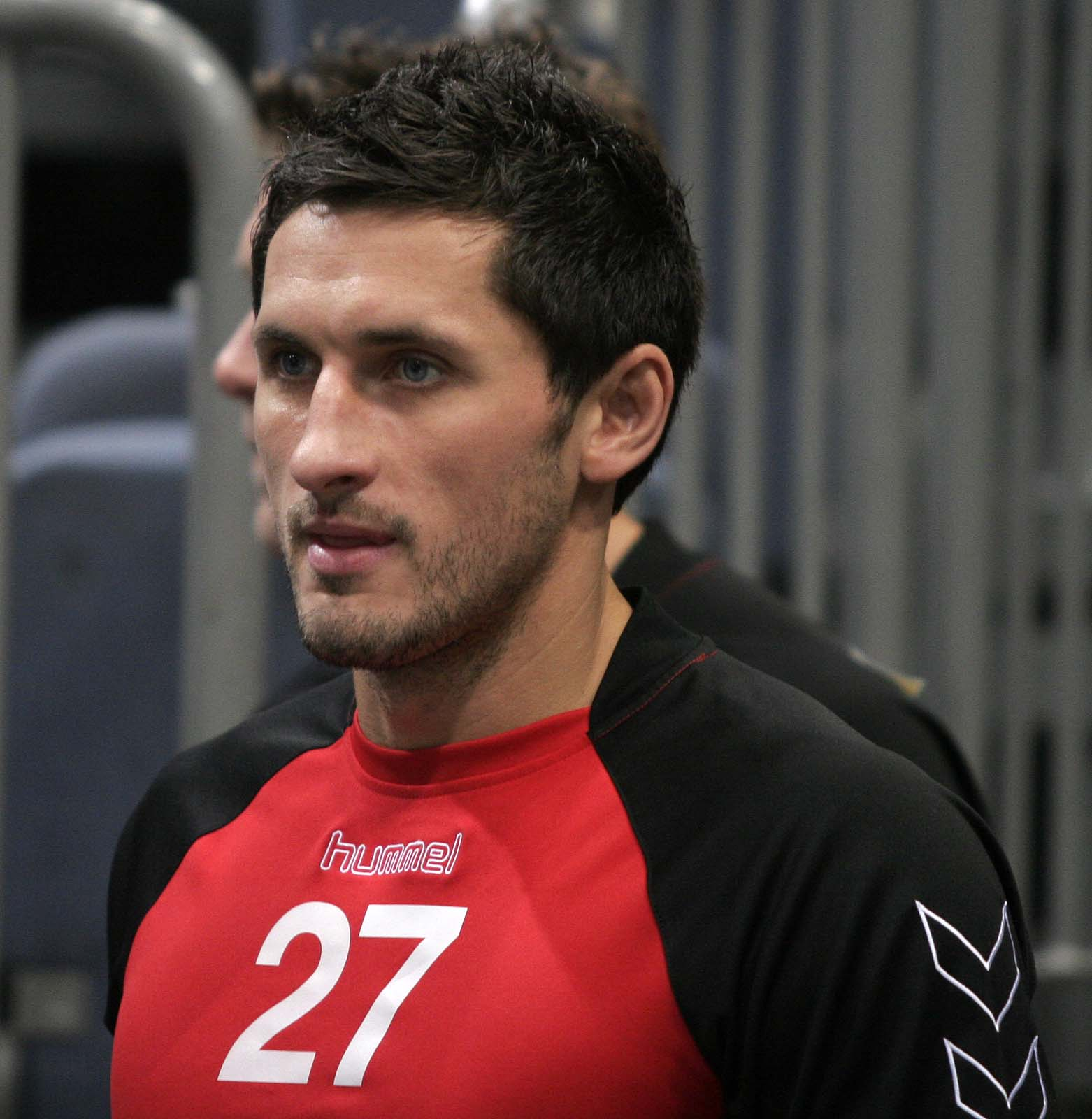

Personal information
- Nationality: Latvian/Icelandic
- Born: 2 July 1980 (age 46) Riga, Latvia SSR
- Height: 1.88 m (6 ft 2 in)

Sport
- Sport: Handball
- Position: Right back

Senior clubs
- Years: Team
- –1998: Riga
- 1998–2003: Grótta/KR
- 2003–2005: HSG Düsseldorf
- 2005–2007: TV Großwallstadt
- 2007–2010: SG Flensburg-Handewitt
- 2010–2012: Füchse Berlin
- 2012–2021: Rhein-Neckar Löwen
- 2021: SG Flensburg-Handewitt
- 2021–2022: MT Melsungen
- 2023–2025: Valur
- 2023: → Al Arabi
National team
Years	Team	Apps	
–	Latvia	40	
2005–2021	Iceland	186	(725)
Medal record
Olympic Games
Silver medal – second place	2008 Beijing	Team
European Championship
Bronze medal – third place	2010 Austria	Team

Alexander Petersson (Latvian: Aleksandrs Pētersons; born 2 July 1980) is a Latvian-born Icelandic former handball player. He was a member of the Icelandic national team from 2005 to 2021, appearing in 186 games. Before that he played for the Latvian national team.

Alexander was voted the Icelandic Sportsperson of the Year in 2010 by the Icelandic Sport Press Association. He is of Latvian and Baltic German origin.

== Early life ==
Alexander was born in Riga in Latvia SSR in 1980. He emigrated to Iceland aged 18 in 1998 to play for Grótta/KR.

== Career ==
In 2003 Petersson joined German team HSG Düsseldorf, followed by TV Großwallstadt in 2005 and SG Flensburg-Handewitt in 2007. In 2010 he joined Füchse Berlin. The same year he was named Icelandic sportsperson of the year. In 2012 he joined Rhein-Neckar Löwen. In his first season with the club he won the 2012–13 EHF Cup. After two seasons, where he finished 2nd in the Bundesliga both times, he won the league in 2016 and 2017 and the DHB-Pokal in 2018. He also won the DHB-Supercup in 2016 and 2018.

In January 2021 he returned to Flensburg-Handewitt. The following summer he joined MT Melsungen. On 13 November 2021 he played his 500th game in the Bundesliga. After the 2021–22 season he retired.

In July 2023 he returned to handball and signed a one-year contract with Valur. Here he won the Icelandic cup and the EHF European Cup. This was the first time an Icelandic club won a European tournament.

In November 2023 he joined Qatari team Al-Arabi on a one-month loan deal. At the age of 44 he won another Icelandic championship title in the 2024–25 season.

In July 2025, he announced his retirement.

=== Seasonal statistics ===
Season	Team	League	Games	Goals	Penalty goals	Outfield goals
2004/05	HSG Düsseldorf	Bundesliga	32	154	0	154
2005/06	TV Großwallstadt	Bundesliga	29	139	26	113
2006/07	TV Großwallstadt	Bundesliga	31	188	25	163
2007/08	SG Flensburg-Handewitt	Bundesliga	29	111	0	111
2008/09	SG Flensburg-Handewitt	Bundesliga	10	28	1	27
2009/10	SG Flensburg-Handewitt	Bundesliga	34	84	0	84
2010/11	Füchse Berlin	Bundesliga	33	119	0	119
2011/12	Füchse Berlin	Bundesliga	28	96	0	96
2012/13	Rhein-Neckar Löwen	Bundesliga	33	142	0	142
2013/14	Rhein-Neckar Löwen	Bundesliga	26	90	0	90
2014/15	Rhein-Neckar Löwen	Bundesliga	30	118	0	118
2015/16	Rhein-Neckar Löwen	Bundesliga	32	87	0	87
2016/17	Rhein-Neckar Löwen	Bundesliga	34	116	0	116
2017/18	Rhein-Neckar Löwen	Bundesliga	33	82	0	82
2018/19	Rhein-Neckar Löwen	Bundesliga	27	94	0	94
2019/20	Rhein-Neckar Löwen	Bundesliga	22	47	0	47
2020/21	Rhein-Neckar Löwen	Bundesliga	11	21	0	21
2020/21	SG Flensburg-Handewitt	Bundesliga	15	10	0	10
2021/22	MT Melsungen	Bundesliga	33	35	0	35
2004–2022	Total	Bundesliga	522	1757	52	1705

=== National team ===
Petersson initially played for the Latvian national team before obtaining Icelandic nationality in 2004. In 2005, he played for the Iceland men's national handball team for the first time.

At the 2007 World Championship he finished 8th with Iceland, and was in the top ten goal scorers list. The following year he won silver medals at the 2008 Olympics, losing to France in the final. At the 2010 European Championship he won bronze medals.

At the 2011 World Championship he was a part of the all star team, when Iceland finished 6th.

He also represented Iceland at the 2012 Olympics where Iceland was knocked out in the quarterfinal by Hungary.

He had to withdraw from the 2013 World Championship due to a shoulder injury. He was replaced by Olafur Stefansson.

At the 2015 World Championship he was however back in the team.

== Personal life ==
Alexander's wife is Eivor Pála Blöndal who played 13 games for the Iceland women's national handball team. His son Lúkas Petersson is a professional footballer in Germany.

== Individual awards ==
- Icelandic Sportsperson of the Year: 2010
- All-Star Right back of the World Championship: 2011
