= Óskar Sigurpálsson =

Icelandic weightlifter (born 1945)

Personal information
- Nationality: Icelandic
- Born: 21 December 1945 (age 79); Kelouskogar, Iceland

Sport
- Sport: Weightlifting

Óskar Sigurpálsson (born 21 December 1945) is an Icelandic weightlifter. He competed at the 1968 Summer Olympics and the 1972 Summer Olympics.
