= Roland Eradze =

Georgian-Icelandic handball player (born 1971)

Roland Valur Eradze
Personal information
- Nationality: Georgian, Icelandic
- Born: 7 May 1971 (age 55) Tbilisi, Georgia, USSR
- Height: 190 cm (75 in)

Sport
- Sport: Handball
- Position: Goalkeeper
- Current club: Retired
National team
Years	Team	Apps	(Gls)
–	Iceland	52	(0)

Roland Valur Eradze (born 7 May 1971 in Tbilisi) is a Soviet, then Georgian and finally Icelandic handball player who competed as a goalkeeper.

With Iceland national team, he participated at the 2004 Summer Olympics.
