= Guðmundur Hrafnkelsson =

Icelandic handball player (born 1965)

Personal information
- Nationality: Icelandic
- Born: 22 January 1965 (age 61) Reykjavík, Iceland
- Height: 1.90 m (6 ft 3 in)

Sport
- Sport: Handball
- Position: Goalkeeper
- Current club: Retired

Youth career
- Years: Team
- 1977–1984: Fylkir

Senior clubs
- Years: Team
- 1984–1989: Breiðablik
- 1989–1991: FH
- 1991–1999: Valur
- 1999–2001: HSG Nordhorn
- 2001–2003: Papillon Conversano
- 2003–2005: SG Kronau/Östringen
- 2005–2006: UMF Afturelding
National team
Years	Team	Apps	(Gls)
1986–2005	Iceland	407	(0)

Guðmundur Hrafnkelsson (born 22 January 1965) is an Icelandic former handball player who competed in the 1988 Summer Olympics, in the 1992 Summer Olympics, and in the 2004 Summer Olympics.
