= Björgvin Páll Gústavsson =

Icelandic handball player (born 1985)

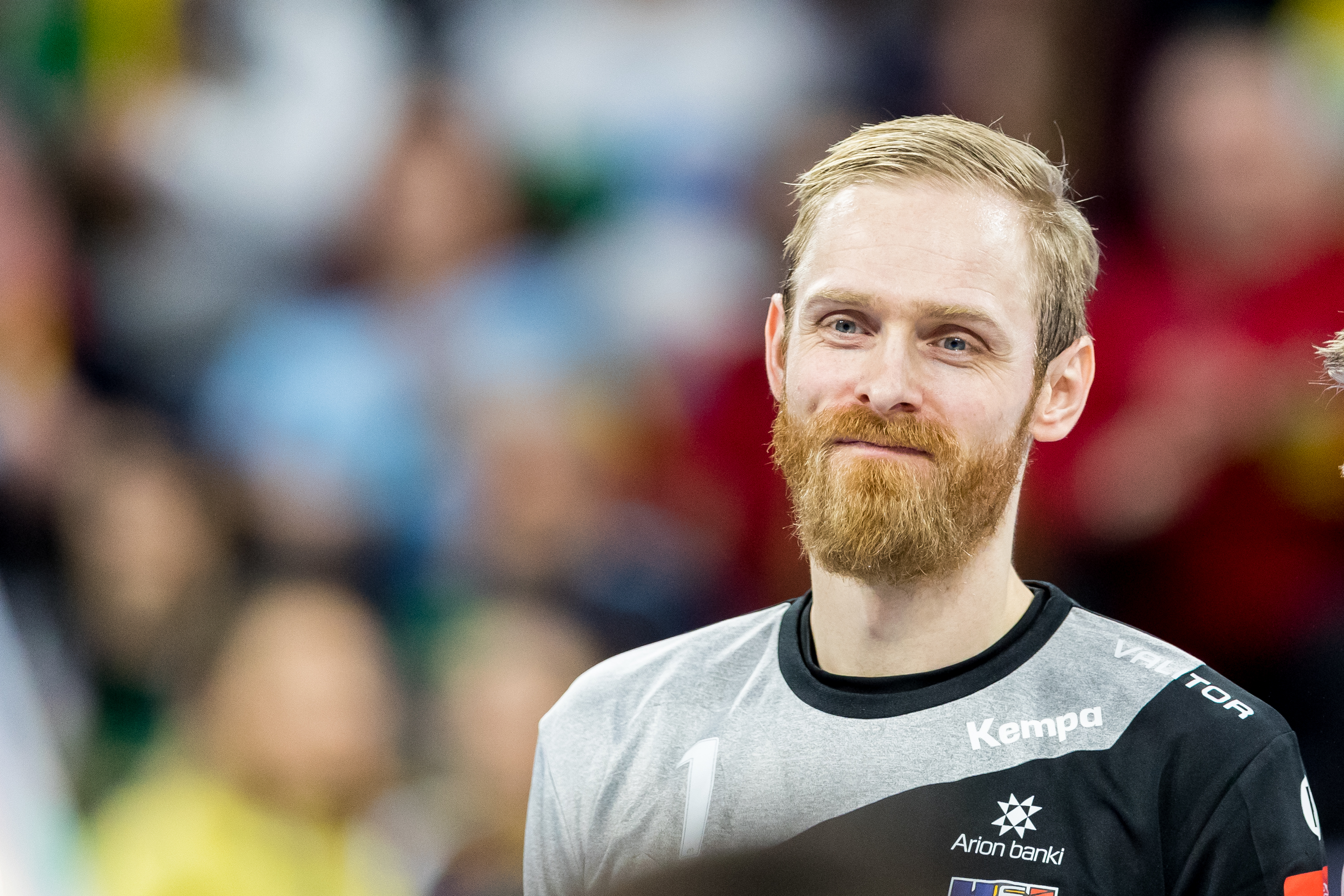

Personal information
- Nationality: Icelandic
- Born: 24 May 1985 (age 41) Hvammstangi, Iceland
- Height: 1.93 m (6 ft 4 in)

Sport
- Sport: Handball
- Position: Goalkeeper
- Current club: Valur (club)
- Number: 1

Senior clubs
- Years: Team
- 2005–2007: Fram Reykjavik
- 2007–2009: TV Bittenfeld
- 2009–2011: Kadetten Schaffhausen
- 2011–2013: SC Magdeburg
- 2013–2017: Bergischer HC
- 2017–2018: Haukar Handball
- 2018–2020: Skjern Håndbold
- 2020: Haukar Handball
- 2021–: Valur
National team
Years	Team	Apps	(Gls)
2006–	Iceland	277	(25)

Teams managed
- 2022–: Bergischer (goalkeeping coach)
Medal record
Olympic Games
Silver medal – second place	2008 Beijing	Team
European Championship
Bronze medal – third place	2010 Austria	Team

Björgvin Páll Gústavsson (born 24 May 1985) is an Icelandic handball player that plays as a goalkeeper.

== Background ==
Björgvin grew up in Kópavogur. He has two brothers, Axel Birgir, and Margeir Felix, and two sisters, Berglind Sif, and Helga Lind. Björgvin describes himself as sharing a very special bond with Berglind and often talks about how she inspired him.

== Career ==
Björgvin started showing interest sports interest at the age of nine. Björgvin and his friend Steinþór Þorsteinsson started in handball with HK, a team from Kópavogur, but they transferred to Víkingur; after two years with Víkingur they returned to HK.

He participated in the 2008 summer Olympics in Beijing as a goalkeeper for the Icelandic national handball team. He played a significant role as goalkeeper, making 75 saves in the tournament and aiding in the team's progression to the finals of the tournament. Iceland was defeated by France with a score of 28–23 in the final, finishing the tournament with Iceland's best ever result, a silver medal.

At the 2026 European Men's Handball Championship he finished 4th with Iceland, losing to Denmark in the semifinal and Croatia in the third-place playoff.
