= Logi Geirsson =

Icelandic handball player (born 1982)

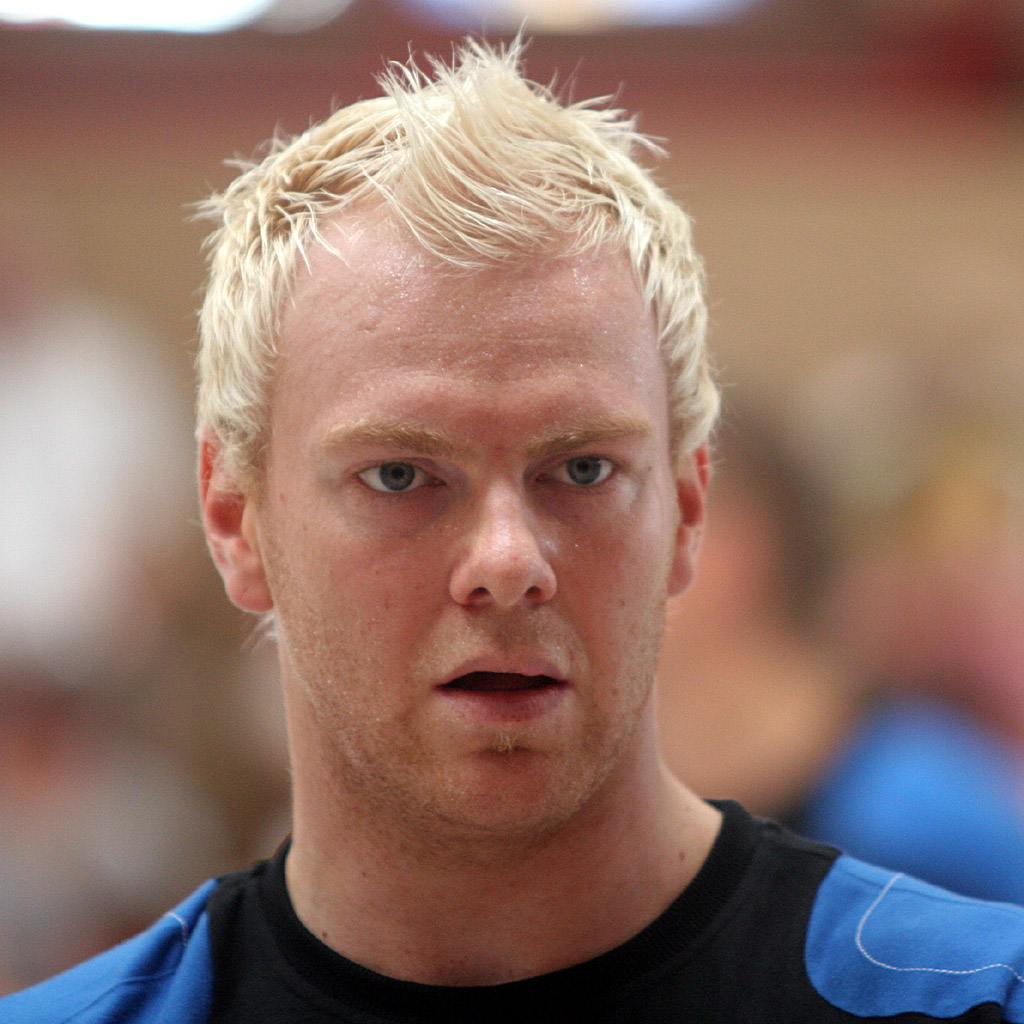
- Geirsson in 2008

Personal information
- Born: 10 October 1982 (age 43) Reykjavík, Iceland

Sport
- Sport: Handball
Medal record
Men's Handball
Representing Iceland
Summer Olympics
Silver medal – second place	2008 Beijing	Team competition
European Championship
Bronze medal – third place	2010 Austria	Team competition

Logi Eldon Geirsson (born 10 October 1982) is a retired Icelandic handballer. His retirement was due to successive shoulder injuries.

Raised in Hafnarfjörður, Iceland, Logi is the son of former Icelandic star Geir Hallsteinsson, who also played as a professional handballer during his playing career.

Logi started his playing career with multiple Icelandic champions, FH Hafnarfjörður. After playing with the FH first team for a couple of years, Logi was sold to TBV Lemgo and finally got into the Icelandic national team. However, he did not get many chances for the Icelandic national team until Viggó Sigurðsson took over from Guðmundur Guðmundsson after the 2004 Olympic Games.
