= Ingimundur Ingimundarson =

Icelandic handball player (born 1980)

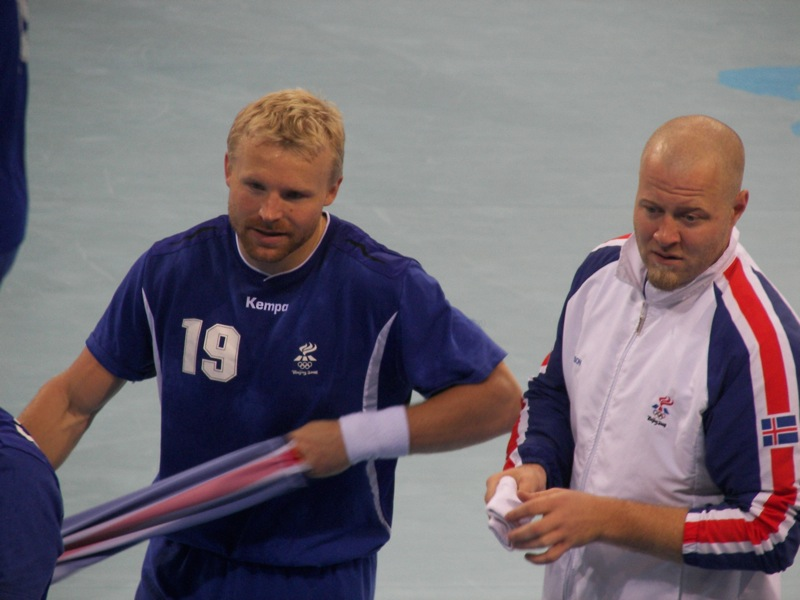
- Ingimundarson(left) with Sigfús Sigurðsson

Personal information
- Nationality: Icelandic
- Born: 29 January 1980 (age 46) Reykjavík, Iceland
- Height: 1.90 m (6 ft 3 in)

Sport
- Sport: Handball
- Position: Left back
- Current club: Akureyri Handboltafélag
- Number: 32

Senior clubs
- Years: Team
- -2005: Íþróttafélag Reykjavíkur ( (Iceland) )
- 2005-2006: Pfadi Winterthur ( (Switzerland) )
- 2006-2007: Ajax Heroes ( (Denmark) )
- 2007-2008: Elverum Håndball ( (Norway) )
- 2008-2010: GWD Minden ( (Germany) )
- 2010-2011: AaB Håndbold ( (Denmark) )
- 2011-2012: Fram Reykjavík ( (Iceland) )
- 2012-2014: Íþróttafélag Reykjavíkur ( (Iceland) )
- 2014-: Akureyri Handboltafélag ( (Iceland) )
National team
Years	Team	Apps	(Gls)
–	Iceland	123	(98)
Medal record
Representing Iceland
Men's Handball
Summer Olympics
Silver medal – second place	2008 Beijing	Team competition
European Championship
Bronze medal – third place	2010 Austria	Team competition
- Updated on 23 December 2014

Ingimundur Ingimundarson (born 29 January 1980) is an Icelandic handball player who played for Íþróttafélag Reykjavíkur in the N1-deild. In June 2008 he was able to leave the Norwegian side Elverum Håndball on free transfer due to a misunderstanding when he agreed to sign a new contract, but never signed it. He then chose to play for GWD Minden from Germany. After coming back to Iceland he joined Fram. After a season at Fram he joined his childhood team, ÍR.

He was part of the Icelandic team that won the silver medal at the 2008 Summer Olympics, and also represented Iceland at the 2012 Summer Olympics.
