= Hjörtur Már Reynisson =

Icelandic swimmer

Personal information
- Full name: Hjörtur Már Reynisson
- National team: Iceland
- Born: 28 March 1983 (age 43) Reykjavík, Iceland
- Height: 1.81 m (5 ft 11 in)
- Weight: 75 kg (165 lb)

Sport
- Sport: Swimming
- Strokes: Butterfly
- Club: KR Reykjavik
- Coach: Mads Claussen; Jacky Pellerin

Hjörtur Már Reynisson (born 28 March 1983) is an Icelandic former swimmer, who specialized in butterfly events. Reynisson is currently a member of KR Reykjavik, being coached and trained by Mads Claussen. He is also a graduate of medicine at the University of Iceland in his home city Reykjavik.

Reynisson made his first Icelandic team at the 2004 Summer Olympics in Athens, where he competed in the men's 100 m butterfly. On the morning preliminaries, Reynisson touched out Argentina's Eduardo Germán Otero to snatch the third spot and forty-second overall in heat 3 by 0.12 of a second, with a time of 55.12 seconds.

At the 2008 Summer Olympics in Beijing, Reynisson qualified for the second time in the 100 m butterfly, by eclipsing a FINA B-standard entry time of 54.32 from the Mare Nostrum Monte Carlo Meet in Monaco. Reynisson challenged seven other swimmers on the third heat, including three-time Olympians Jeremy Knowles of the Bahamas and Camilo Becerra of Colombia. He edged out Becerra to take a fifth spot by a single tenth margin (0.10), posting his lifetime best of 54.17, just 0.15 of a second faster than his entry time. Reynisson failed to advance into the semifinals, as he placed fifty-second out of 66 swimmers in the preliminary heats.
