= Hreiðar Guðmundsson =

Icelandic handball player (born 1980)

Personal information
- Full name: Hreiðar Levý Guðmundsson
- Nationality: Icelandic
- Born: 29 November 1980 (age 45) Reykjavík, Iceland
- Height: 1.93 m (6 ft 4 in)

Sport
- Sport: Handball
- Position: Goalkeeper

Senior clubs
- Years: Team
- -2007: KA Akureyri
- 2007-2009: IK Sävehof
- 2009-2011: TV Emsdetten
- 2011-2014: Nøtterøy IF
- 2014-2016: KA Akureyri
- 2016-2017: Halden Topphåndball
- 2017-2018: Íþróttafélagið Grótta
National team
Years	Team	Apps	(Gls)
–	Iceland	142	(2)
Medal record
Representing Iceland
Men's Handball
Summer Olympics
Silver medal – second place	2008 Beijing	Team competition
European Championship
Bronze medal – third place	2010 Austria	Team competition

Hreiðar Levy Guðmundsson (born 29 November 1980) is an Icelandic handball player who currently plays for Íþróttafélagið Grótta in Iceland. He has previously played in both Swedish, Norwegian and German handball. He was part of the Icelandic team that won the silver medal at the 2008 Summer Olympics.
