= Róbert Gunnarsson =

Icelandic handball player (born 1980)

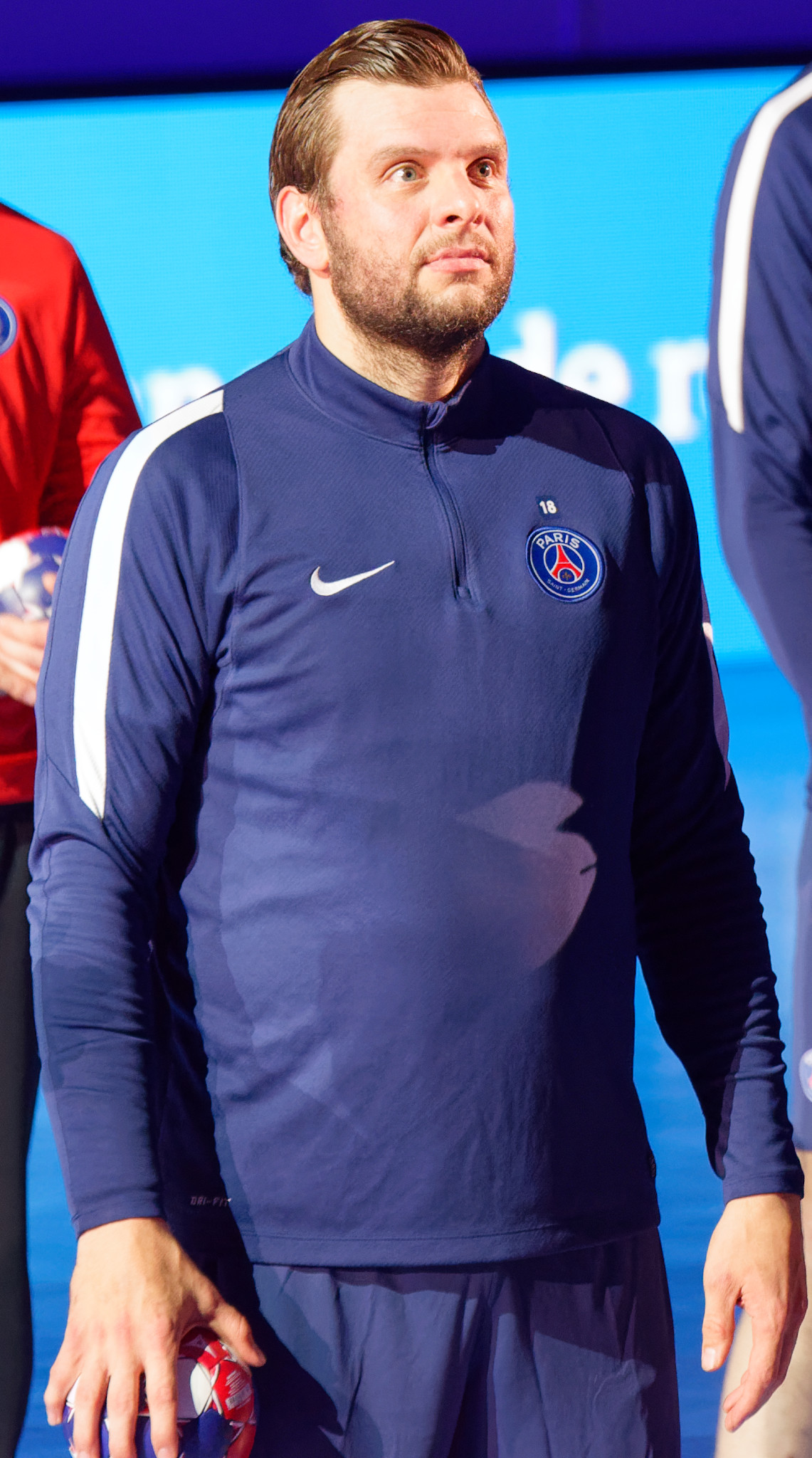

Personal information
- Nationality: Icelandic
- Born: 22 May 1980 (age 46) Reykjavík, Iceland
- Height: 1.90 m (6 ft 3 in)

Sport
- Sport: Handball
- Position: Pivot
- Current club: Retired
- Number: 18

Senior clubs
- Years: Team
- –: Fylkir
- –2002: Fram
- 2002–2005: Aarhus Håndbold
- 2005–2010: VfL Gummersbach
- 2010–2012: Rhein-Neckar Löwen
- 2012–2016: PSG Handball
- 2016–2018: Aarhus Håndbold
National team
Years	Team	Apps	(Gls)
2002–2016	Iceland	272	(770)
Medal record
Olympic Games
Silver medal – second place	2008 Beijing	Team
European Championship
Bronze medal – third place	2010 Austria	Team

Róbert Gunnarsson (born 22 May 1980) is an Icelandic former handball player who featured in the Icelandic national team as a line player. He has competed for Iceland at three Olympic Games, winning a silver medal at the 2008 Summer Olympics.

In the 2004-05 season he was the top scorer in the Danish Men's Handball League with 241 goals.
