= Ásgeir Örn Hallgrímsson =

Icelandic handball player (born 1984)

Ásgeir Örn Hallgrimsson
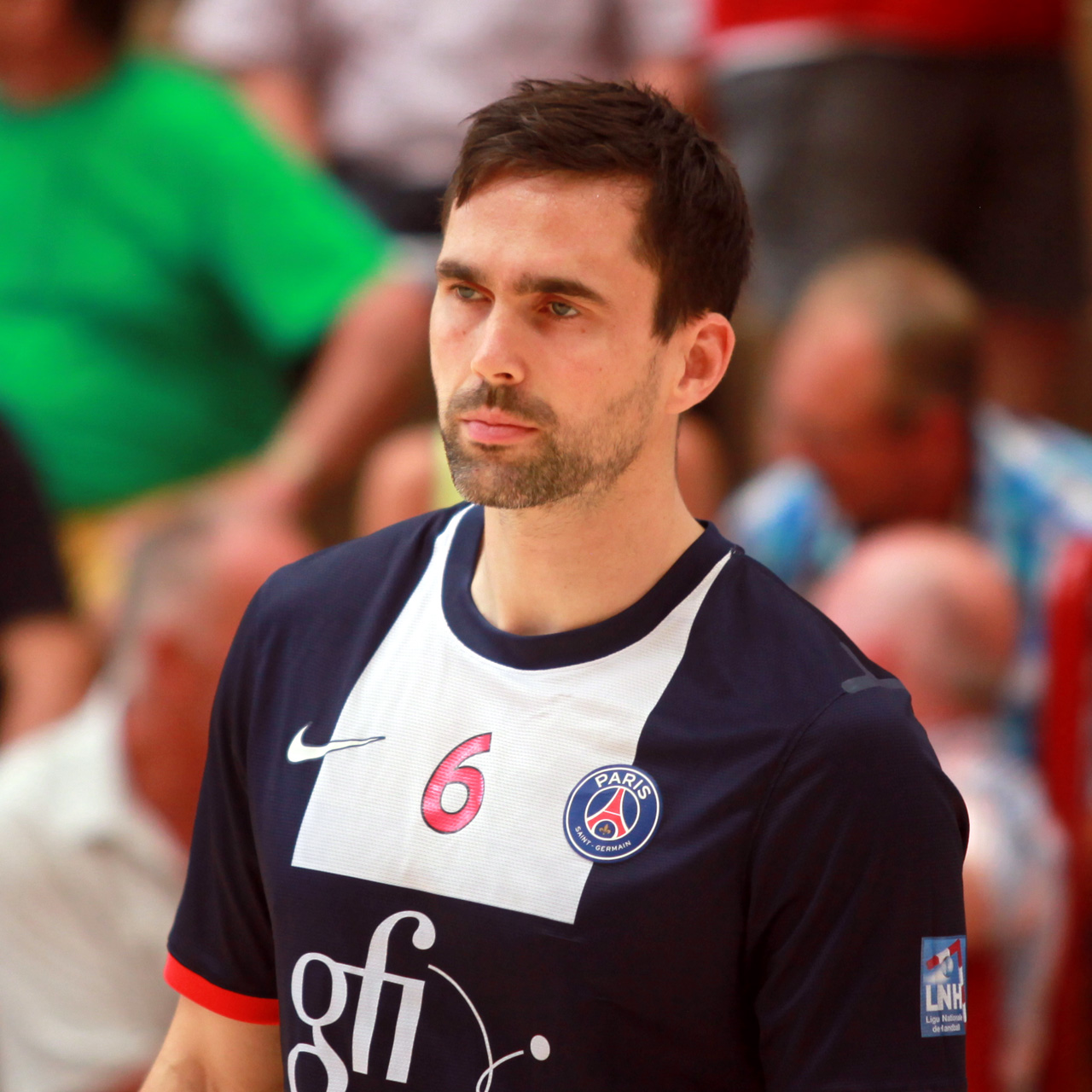

Personal information
- Nationality: Icelandic
- Born: 17 February 1984 (age 42) Reykjavík, Iceland
- Height: 1.91 m (6 ft 3 in)

Sport
- Sport: Handball
- Position: Right back
- Current club: Haukar
- Number: 14

Senior clubs
- Years: Team
- 2000–2005: Haukar
- 2005–2007: TBV Lemgo
- 2007–2010: GOG Gudme
- 2010: Faaborg HK
- 2010–2012: TSV Hannover-Burgdorf
- 2012–2014: PSG Handball
- 2014–2018: USAM Nîmes
- 2018–2020: Haukar
National team
Years	Team	Apps	(Gls)
2003–2018	Iceland	247	(414)
Medal record
Olympic Games
Silver medal – second place	2008 Beijing	Team
European Championship
Bronze medal – third place	2010 Austria	Team

Ásgeir Örn Hallgrimsson (born 17 February 1984) is an Icelandic former handball player. After starting his career with Haukar, he went on to play several seasons professionally around Europe, including with GOG and TBV Lemgo. He announced his retirement following the 2019–2020 season.

Ásgeir played 247 games for the Icelandic national team, scoring 414 goals, and competed with the team at the 2004, 2008, and 2012 Summer Olympics.
