= Sigfús Sigurðsson (handballer) =

Icelandic handball player (born 1975)

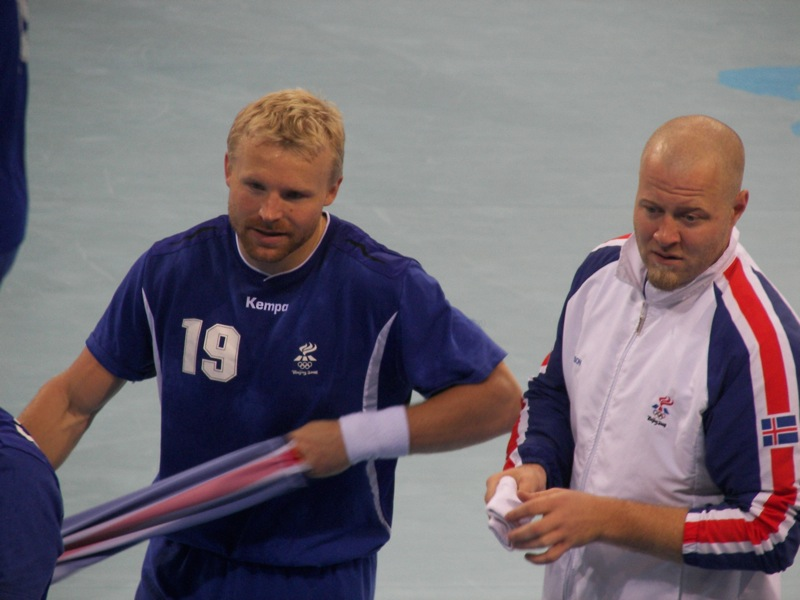
- Sigurðsson (right) with Ingimundur Ingimundarson

Personal information
- Born: 7 May 1975 (age 51) Reykjavík, Iceland
- Height: 1.98 m (6 ft 6 in)
- Weight: 114 kg (251 lb)

Sport
- Sport: Handball
- Club: SC Magdeburg; Valur Reykjavík
Medal record
Representing Iceland
Summer Olympics
Silver medal – second place	2008 Beijing	Team

Sigfús Sigurðsson (born 7 May 1975) is a retired Icelandic handball player. He competed at the 2004 and 2008 Summer Olympics, winning the silver medal in 2008. His grandfather, also Sigfús Sigurðsson, competed in the shot put at the 1948 Olympics.

== Personal life ==
His nickname is "The Russian Jeep" in Iceland. He was engaged to Brazilian belly dancer Josy Zareen and they had a baby girl named Eyvör, born in April 2013. They broke up later that year.

== Controversy ==
In November 2013 he admitted to having sold his Olympic silver medal won in 2008. Icelandic Handball Association intervened and became the custodian of the medal. His past problems with alcohol and drugs resulted in his bankruptcy; he has been clean for some years and is actively helping others attending AA meetings.
