= Guðmundur Guðmundsson (handballer) =

Icelandic handball player (born 1960)

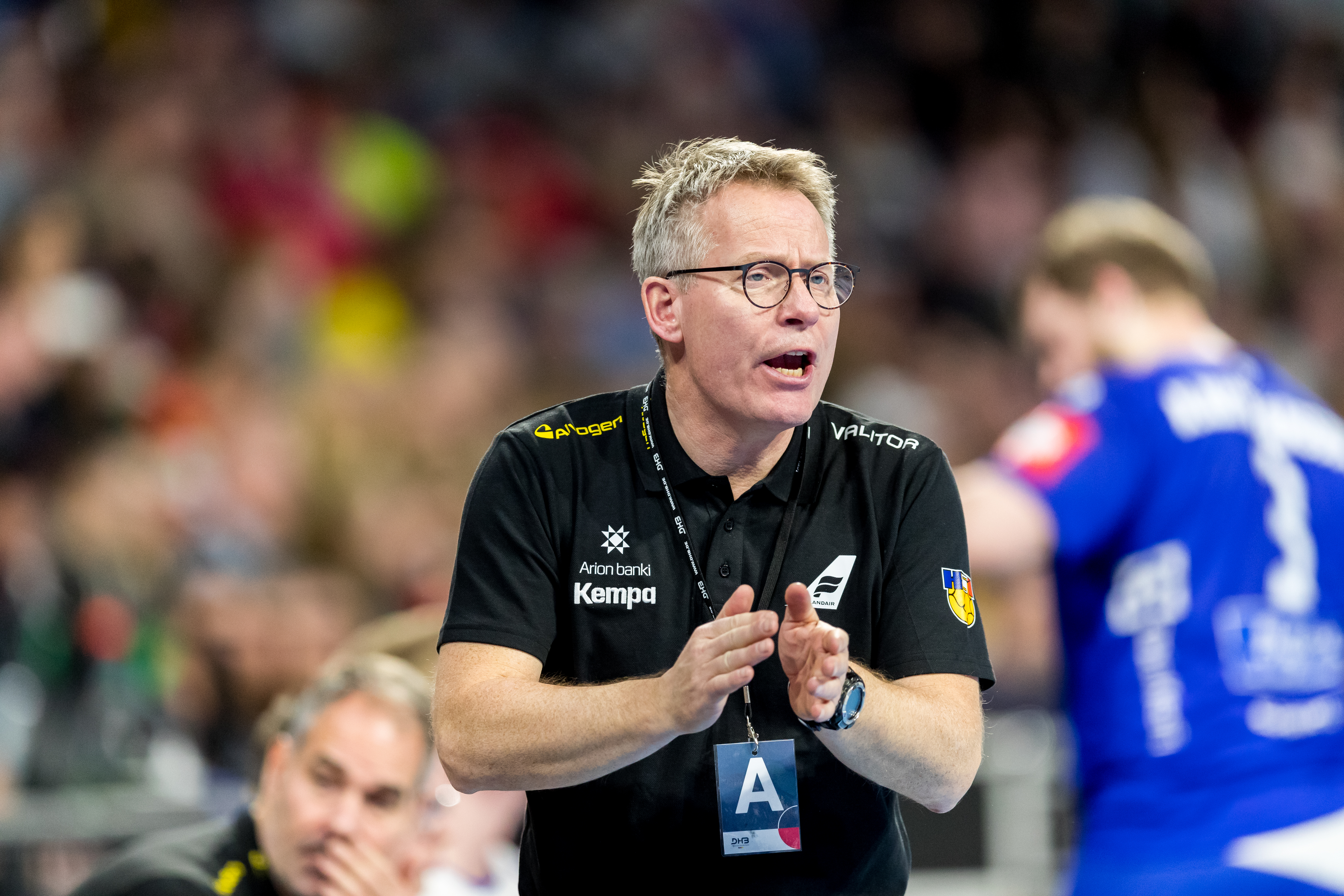

Personal information
- Full name: Guðmundur Þórður Guðmundsson
- Nationality: Icelandic
- Born: 23 December 1960 (age 65) Reykjavík, Iceland
- Height: 1.74 m (5 ft 9 in)

Sport
- Sport: Handball
- Position: Left wing

Senior clubs
- Years: Team
- 1979–1992: Víkingur Reykjavík
- 1992–1995: Afturelding
National team
Years	Team	Apps	(Gls)
1980–1990	Iceland	231	(354)

Teams managed
- 1989–1992: Víkingur Reykjavík
- 1992–1995: Afturelding
- 1995–1999: Fram
- 1999–2001: TSV Bayer Dormagen
- 2001–2004: Iceland
- 2005–2007: Fram
- 2008–2012: Iceland
- 2009–2010: GOG Svendborg
- 2010–2014: Rhein-Neckar Löwen
- 2014–2017: Denmark
- 2017–2018: Bahrain
- 2018–2023: Iceland
- 2020–2021: MT Melsungen
- 2022–2025: Fredericia HK
Medal record
Men's handball
Iceland
Olympic Games
Silver medal – second place	2008 China	Team
European Championship
Bronze medal – third place	2010 Austria
Denmark
Olympic Games
Gold medal – first place	2016 Rio de Janeiro

Guðmundur Þórður Guðmundsson (born 23 December 1960) is an Icelandic handball coach and former player. In 2016, he guided Denmark men's team to gold in the 2016 Olympics. In 2008, he won silver with the Icelandic men's national team at the 2008 Olympic games in China.

As a player, he won the Icelandic championship six times and the Icelandic cup four times with Víkingur Reykjavík. Guðmundur also played for the Icelandic national team for a decade, participating in two Olympics and two IHF World Handball Championship.

== Playing career ==
=== Club career ===
Guðmundur started his senior team career with Víkingur Reykjavík in 1979. With Víkingur, he won six national championships and four national Cups. In 1992, he joined Afturelding where he finished his playing career in 1995.

=== National team career ===
From 1980 to 1990, Guðmundur played 231 games for the Icelandic national team, scoring 354 goals. With Iceland, he participated in the 1984 and 1988 Summer Olympics as well as the 1986 and 1990 World Handball Championship

== Coaching career ==
He was the head coach of the Iceland men's national handball team 2001–2004 and again 2008–2012. Under his command the Iceland national team received a silver medal at the 2008 Summer Olympics in Beijing and bronze medal at the 2010 European Championship in Austria.

Guðmundur has been considered one of the best coaches of the era, alongside fellow Icelanders Dagur Sigurðsson (coach of the Japan's national Men's team) and Alfreð Gíslason, coach of THW Kiel. He has cited former coach Bogdan Kowalczyk as a major influence.

=== Denmark ===
In October 2013, it was announced that Guðmundur would take over as the head coach of the Danish men's national handball team on 1 July 2014, replacing Ulrik Wilbek. His first major international tournament was the 2014 European Championship, where Denmark won silver medals, losing to Spain in the final. This was the second final in a row that Denmark had lost to Spain.

On 21 August 2016 Guðmundur led his team to the gold medal at the 2016 Summer Olympics in Rio de Janeiro, Brazil. Denmark finished 3rd in group A behind Croatia and France. Denmark would then go on to beat Slovenia and Poland on the road to the final, where they met France again. Despite losing their first encounter, Denmark won the final 33-30 with Mikkel Hansen being the top scorer with 8 goals. During the Olympics, former coach Ulrik Wilbek made two attempts to gain the consent of the Danish players to fire Guðmundur, once during the tournament and then the day after Denmark won the gold. He announced in November 2016 that he would not renew his contract, which was set to expire on 1 July 2017. After his departure from the Denmark team, Guðmundur criticized his predecessor Wilbek's, who was then the head of the Danish Handball Federation, repeated attempts to undercut his management of the team during the Olympics.

After the controversy, Wilbek handed over his responsibilities to others in DHF.

=== Later career ===
It was reported in April 2017 that he would take over the Bahrain men's national handball team.

In 2018 he returned to coach the Icelandic national team for the third time. He signed a contract for three years. On 11 January 2020, he faced Denmark for the first time since his departure and guided Iceland to a 30–31 victory.

In February 2020 Guðmundur took over as a coach at MT Melsungen in the German Bundesliga. He signed a contract to the end of the season but remained coach of the Icelandic national team. In September 2021, he was sacked after 3 league matches only

On 21 February 2023, Guðmundur resigned as the manager of the Icelandic national team after five years at the helm.

== Honours ==
=== Player ===
Víkingur Reykjavík.

- Icelandic champion (6): 1979–80, 1980–81, 1981–82, 1982–83, 1985–86, 1986–87
- Icelandic cup (4): 1982–83, 1983–84, 1984–85, 1985–86

=== Manager ===
Fram

- Icelandic champion: 2006

Rhein-Neckar Löwen

- EHF Cup 2012–2013

Iceland

- Olympic Games:
  - Silver: 2008
- EHF Euro:
  - Bronze: 2010

Denmark

- Olympic Games:
  - Gold: 2016

Bahrain

- Asian championship:
  - Silver: 2018
