= Snorri Guðjónsson =

Icelandic handball player (born 1981)

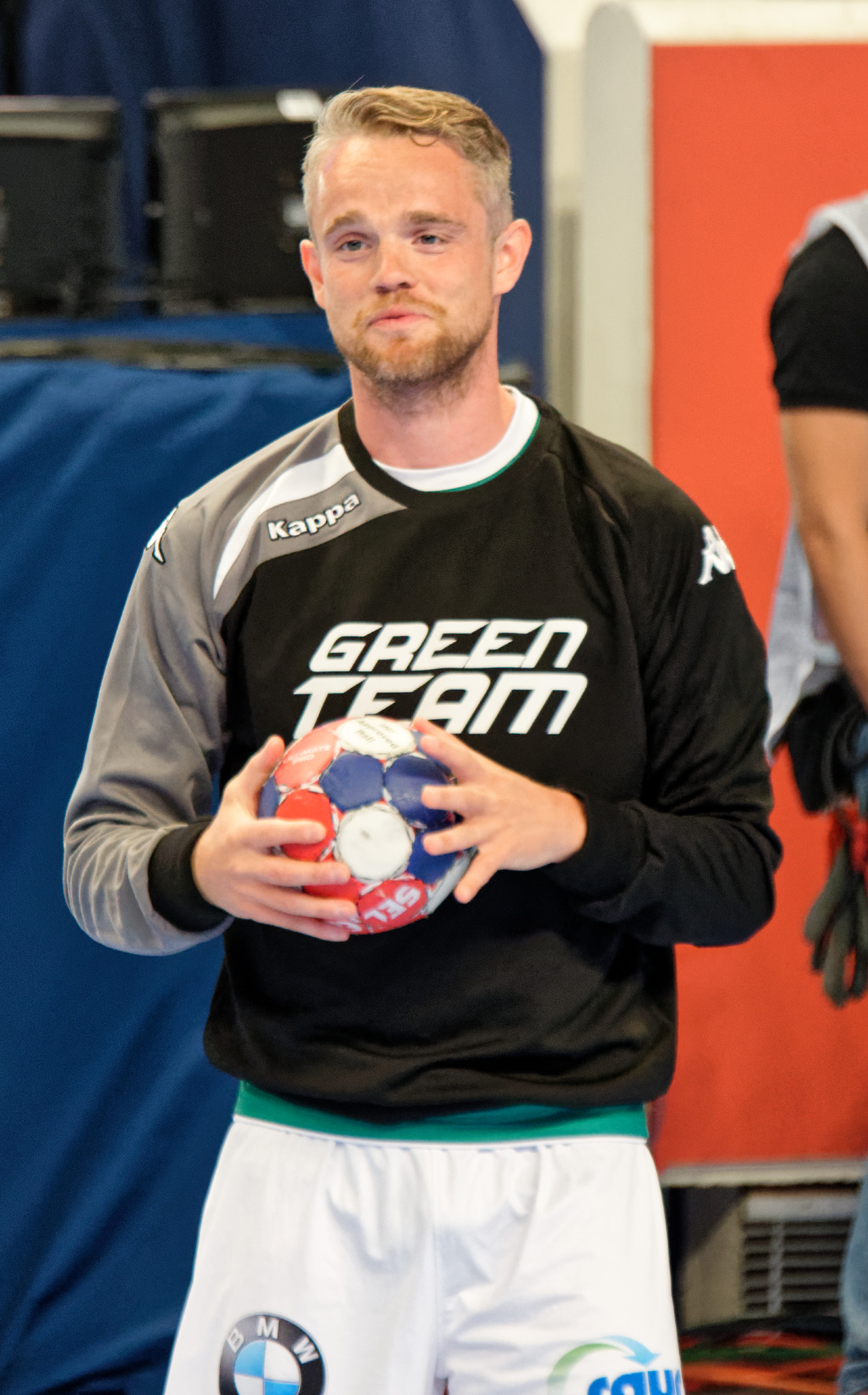

Personal information
- Full name: Snorri Steinn Guðjónsson
- Nationality: Icelandic
- Born: 17 October 1981 (age 45) Reykjavík, Iceland
- Height: 1.87 m (6 ft 2 in)

Sport
- Sport: Handball
- Position: Centre back

Senior clubs
- Years: Team
- 1999–2003: Valur
- 2003–2005: TV Grosswallstadt
- 2005–2007: GWD Minden
- 2007–2009: GOG Svendborg TGI
- 2009–2010: Rhein-Neckar Löwen
- 2010–2012: AG København
- 2012–2014: GOG
- 2014–2015: Sélestat Alsace Handball
- 2015–2017: USAM Nîmes
- 2017–2018: Valur
National team
Years	Team	Apps	(Gls)
2001–2016	Iceland	257	(846)

Teams managed
- 2017–2023: Valur
- 2023–: Iceland
Medal record
Olympic Games
Silver medal – second place	2008 Beijing	Team
European Championship
Bronze medal – third place	2010 Austria	Team

Snorri Steinn Guðjónsson (born 17 October 1981) is a former Icelandic handball player and the current coach of Iceland men's national handball team. He also played for the Icelandic national team, winning the silver medal at the 2008 Summer Olympics and the bronze at the 2010 European Championships.

Snorri has previously played for TV Grosswallstadt, GWD Minden, Rhein-Neckar Löwen and GOG.

He is the son of former sports journalist Guðjón Guðmundsson.

At the 2026 European Championship he guided Iceland to a 4th place, losing to Denmark in the semifinal and Croatia in the third place playoff. Later the same year he extended his contract with Iceland until after the 2032 Olympics.
