= Iceland men's national handball team =

Iceland

Information
- Nickname: Strákarnir okkar (English: Our boys)
- Association: Icelandic Handball Association (Handknattleikssamband Íslands)
- Coach: Snorri Guðjónsson
- Assistant coach: Arnór Atlason; Roland Eradze; Óskar Bjarni Óskarsson
- Captain: Ómar Ingi Magnússon
- Most caps: Guðmundur Hrafnkelsson (407)
- Most goals: Guðjón Valur Sigurðsson (1879)

Colours
1st	2nd

Results

Summer Olympics
- Appearances: 7 (First in 1972)
- Best result: (silver) 2nd (2008)

World Championship
- Appearances: 23 (First in 1958)
- Best result: 5th (1997)

European Championship
- Appearances: 14 (First in 2000)
- Best result: (bronze) 3rd (2010)
- Last updated on Unknown.

Iceland men's national handball team
Medal record

Olympic Games
Silver medal – second place	2008 Beijing	Team

European Championship
Bronze medal – third place	2010 Austria	

The Iceland men's national handball team represents Iceland in international men's handball. It is controlled by the Icelandic Handball Association.

== Honours ==
Competition	1st place, gold medalist(s)	2nd place, silver medalist(s)	3rd place, bronze medalist(s)	Total
Olympic Games	0	1	0	1
World Championship	0	0	0	0
European Championship	0	0	1	1
Total	0	1	1	2

== Competitive record ==
Champions Runners-up Third place Fourth place

=== Olympic Games ===
Games	Round	Position	Pld	W	D	L	GF	GA	GD
(Germany) 1936 Berlin	did not enter								
Not held from 1948 to 1968
(West Germany) 1972 Munich	Match for 11th place	12th of 16	5	1	1	3	92	90	+2
(Canada) 1976 Montreal	did not qualify								
(Soviet Union) 1980 Moscow	did not qualify								
(United States) 1984 Los Angeles	Match for 5th place	6th of 12	6	3	1	2	126	122	+4
(South Korea) 1988 Seoul	Match for 7th place	8th of 12	6	2	1	3	125	133	−8
(Spain) 1992 Barcelona	Fourth place	4th of 12	7	3	1	3	140	146	−6
(United States) 1996 Atlanta	did not qualify								
(Australia) 2000 Sydney	did not qualify								
(Greece) 2004 Athens	Match for 9th place	9th of 12	6	2	0	4	172	183	−11
(China) 2008 Beijing	Runners-up	2nd of 12	8	4	2	2	242	234	+8
(United Kingdom) 2012 London	Quarter-finals	5th of 12	6	5	0	1	200	166	+34
(Brazil) 2016 Rio de Janeiro	did not qualify								
(Japan) 2020 Tokyo	did not qualify								
(France) 2024 Paris	did not qualify								
Total	7/12	0 Titles	44	20	6	18	1,097	1,074	+23

=== World Championship ===
Year	Round	Position	Pld	W	D	L	GF	GA	GD
1938 Germany	did not participate								
1954 Sweden	did not participate								
1958 East Germany	Preliminary round	10th of 16	3	1	0	2	46	57	−11
1961 West Germany	Main round	6th of 12	6	2	1	3	85	96	−11
1964 Czechoslovakia	Preliminary round	9th of 16	3	2	0	1	40	39	+1
1967 Sweden	did not participate								
1970 France	Placement round	11th of 16	6	2	0	4	96	112	−16
1974 East Germany	Preliminary round	14th of 16	3	0	0	3	48	66	−18
1978 Denmark	Preliminary round	13th of 16	3	0	0	3	54	68	−14
1982 West Germany	did not participate								
1986 Switzerland	Main round	6th of 16	7	3	0	4	155	159	−4
1990 Czechoslovakia	Main round	10th of 16	7	2	0	5	151	169	−18
1993 Sweden	Main round	8th of 16	7	3	0	4	158	155	+3
1995 Iceland	Round of 16	14th of 24	7	3	0	4	154	160	−6
1997 Japan	Quarter-finals	5th of 24	9	7	1	1	236	203	+33
1999 Egypt	did not participate								
2001 France	Round of 16	11th of 24	6	2	1	3	152	150	+2
2003 Portugal	Ranking games	7th of 24	9	6	0	3	308	234	+74
2005 Tunisia	Preliminary round	15th of 24	5	2	1	2	154	144	+10
2007 Germany	Quarter-finals	8th of 24	10	4	0	6	337	315	+22
2009 Croatia	did not qualify								
2011 Sweden	Ranking games	6th of 24	9	5	0	4	266	246	+20
2013 Spain	Round of 16	12th of 24	6	3	0	3	181	166	+15
2015 Qatar	Round of 16	11th of 24	6	2	1	3	152	165	−13
2017 France	Round of 16	14th of 24	6	1	2	3	153	152	+1
/ 2019 Denmark/Germany	Main round	11th of 24	8	3	0	5	207	211	−4
2021 Egypt	Main round	20th of 32	6	2	0	4	170	155	+15
/ 2023 Poland/Sweden	Main round	12th of 32	6	4	0	2	207	183	+24
/ / 2025 Croatia/Denmark/Norway	Main round	9th of 32	6	5	0	1	180	135	+45
2027 Germany	qualified								
/ 2029 France/Germany	to be determined								
// 2031 Denmark/Iceland/Norway	Qualiifed as co-host								
Total	25/32	0 Titles	144	64	7	73	3690	3540	+150

=== Euro Tournaments ===
All teams in these tournaments are European, all World and Olympic Champions, and top 7 from World Championships and Olympics were participating. They were mini European championships at the time, till 1994 when official European Championship started.

EURO World Cup tournament Sweden

- 1988 (Sweden) : 4th place

EURO Super Cup tournament Germany

- None (Germany)

=== European Championship ===
Year	Round	Position	Pld	W	D	L	GF	GA	GD
(Portugal) 1994	did not participate								
(Spain) 1996	did not participate								
(Italy) 1998	did not participate								
(Croatia) 2000	Match for 11th place	11th of 12	6	1	0	5	147	162	−15
(Sweden) 2002	Fourth place	4th of 16	8	4	2	2	221	209	+12
(Slovenia) 2004	Preliminary round	13th of 16	3	0	1	2	87	96	−9
(Switzerland) 2006	Main round	7th of 16	6	2	1	3	190	191	−1
(Norway) 2008	Main round	11th of 16	6	2	0	4	157	172	−15
(Austria) 2010	Third place	3rd of 16	8	4	3	1	249	240	+9
(Serbia) 2012	Main round	10th of 16	6	2	1	3	177	178	−1
(Denmark) 2014	Fifth place game	5th of 16	7	4	1	2	199	199	0
(Poland) 2016	Preliminary round	13th of 16	3	1	0	2	92	101	−9
(Croatia) 2018	Preliminary round	13th of 16	3	1	0	2	74	82	−8
(Austria) / (Norway) / (Sweden) 2020	Main round	11th of 24	7	3	0	4	191	195	−4
(Hungary) / (Slovakia) 2022	Fifth place game	6th of 24	8	5	0	3	230	212	+18
(Germany) 2024	Main round	10th of 24	7	3	1	3	200	209	−9
(Denmark) / (Norway) / (Sweden) 2026	Fourth place	4th of 24	9	5	1	3	296	263	+33
(Portugal) / (Spain) / (Switzerland) 2028	To be determined								
(Czech Republic) (Denmark) (Poland) 2030	To be determined								
(France) (Germany) 2032	To be determined								
Total	14/20		87	37	11	39	2510	2509	+1

== Team ==
=== Current squad ===
Squad for the 2026 European Men's Handball Championship.

Head coach: Snorri Guðjónsson

No.	Pos.	Name	Date of birth (age)	Height	App.	Goals	Club
1	GK	Björgvin Páll Gústavsson	24 May 1985 (age 41)	1.93 m	287	26	(Iceland) Valur
2	RW	Óðinn Þór Ríkharðsson	23 October 1997 (age 28)	1.83 m	58	178	(Switzerland) Kadetten Schaffhausen
3	CB	Janus Daði Smárason	1 January 1995 (age 31)	1.84 m	100	177	(Hungary) SC Pick Szeged
6	CB	Elvar Ásgeirsson	4 September 1994 (age 32)	1.94 m	21	24	(Denmark) SGI-Håndbold
7	RB	Viggó Kristjánsson	9 December 1993 (age 32)	1.87 m	73	219	(Germany) HC Erlangen
8	LW	Bjarki Már Elísson	16 May 1990 (age 36)	1.90 m	128	426	(Hungary) Veszprém KC
9	LB	Elvar Örn Jónsson	31 August 1997 (age 29)	1.85 m	93	214	(Germany) SC Magdeburg
10	CB	Gísli Þorgeir Kristjánsson	30 July 1999 (age 27)	1.86 m	75	171	(Germany) SC Magdeburg
11	P	Ýmir Örn Gíslason	15 July 1997 (age 29)	1.96 m	108	48	(Germany) Frisch Auf Göppingen
14	RB	Ómar Ingi Magnússon	12 March 1997 (age 29)	1.86 m	94	341	(Germany) SC Magdeburg
15	LB	Þorsteinn Leó Gunnarsson	13 November 2002 (age 23)	2.08 m	19	39	(Portugal) FC Porto
16	GK	Viktor Gísli Hallgrímsson	24 July 2000 (age 26)	2.04 m	74	2	(Spain) FC Barcelona
18	P	Elliði Snær Viðarsson	15 November 1998 (age 27)	1.94 m	64	138	(Germany) VfL Gummersbach
19	LW	Orri Freyr Þorkelsson	25 June 1999 (age 27)	1.84 m	32	106	(Portugal) Sporting CP
21	P	Arnar Freyr Arnarsson	14 March 1996 (age 30)	2.01 m	107	115	(Germany) MT Melsungen
22	RW	Sigvaldi Guðjónsson	4 July 1994 (age 32)	1.92 m	85	230	(Denmark) Kolstad Håndball
24	RB	Teitur Örn Einarsson	23 September 1998 (age 28)	1.90 m	48	46	(Germany) VfL Gummersbach
25	CB	Haukur Þrastarson	14 April 2001 (age 25)	1.93 m	47	64	(Germany) Rhein-Neckar Löwen
27	LB	Einar Þorsteinn Ólafsson	30 September 2001 (age 25)	2.00 m	27	7	(Germany) HSV Hamburg
34	CB	Andri Már Rúnarsson	21 August 2002 (age 24)	1.88 m	8	8	(Germany) HC Erlangen

=== Past squads ===
2008 Olympic Games (2nd place)

All Star Team: Guðjón Valur Sigurðsson (left wing), Snorri Guðjónsson (centre back), Ólafur Stefánsson (right back)

Björgvin Páll Gústavsson, Logi Geirsson, Bjarni Fritzson, Sigfús Sigurðsson, Ásgeir Örn Hallgrímsson, Arnór Atlason, Guðjón Valur Sigurðsson, Snorri Guðjónsson, Ólafur Stefánsson, Sturla Ásgeirsson, Alexander Petersson, Hreiðar Guðmundsson, Sverre Andreas Jakobsson, Róbert Gunnarsson, Ingimundur Ingimundarson.

Coach: Guðmundur Guðmundsson

2010 European Championship (3rd place)

All Star Team: Ólafur Stefánsson (right back)

Björgvin Páll Gústavsson, Hreiðar Guðmundsson, Vignir Svavarsson, Logi Geirsson, Ásgeir Örn Hallgrímsson, Arnór Atlason, Guðjón Valur Sigurðsson, Snorri Guðjónsson, Ólafur Stefánsson, Alexander Petersson, Sverre Andreas Jakobsson, Róbert Gunnarsson, Ingimundur Ingimundarson, Sturla Ásgeirsson, Þórir Ólafsson, Aron Pálmarsson, Ólafur Guðmundsson, Rúnar Kárason.

Coach: Guðmundur Guðmundsson

=== List of coaches ===
#	Period	Coach
1	1950	Sigurður Magnússon
2	1958	Hallsteinn Hinriksson
3	1959	Frímann Gunnlaugsson
4	1961–1963	Hallsteinn Hinriksson (2nd period)
5	1964–1967	Karl Benediktsson
6	1968	Birgir Björnsson
7	1968–1972	Hilmar Björnsson
(5)	1973–1974	Karl Benediktsson (2nd period)
(6)	1974–1975	Birgir Björnsson (2nd period)
8	1975–1976	Viðar Símonarson
9	1976–1977	Janus Czerwinsky
(6)	1977–1978	Birgir Björnsson (3rd period)
10	1978–1980	Jóhann Ingi Gunnarsson
(7)	1980–1983	Hilmar Björnsson (2nd period)
11	1983–1990	Bogdan Kowalczyk
12	1990–1995	Þorbergur Aðalsteinsson
13	1995–2001	Þorbjörn Jensson
14	2001–2004	Guðmundur Guðmundsson
15	2004–2006	Viggó Sigurðsson
16	2006–2008	Alfreð Gíslason
(14)	2008–2012	Guðmundur Guðmundsson (2nd period)
17	2012–2016	Aron Kristjánsson
18	2016–2018	Geir Sveinsson
(14)	2018–2023	Guðmundur Guðmundsson (3rd period)
19	2023	Gunnar Magnússon / Ágúst Þór Jóhannsson
20	2023–	Snorri Guðjónsson

=== List of captains ===
#	Period	Captain
1986	1991	Þorgils Óttar Mathiesen
1991	1999	Geir Sveinsson
1999	2005	Dagur Sigurðsson
2005	2012	Ólafur Stefánsson
2012	2020	Guðjón Valur Sigurðsson
2020	2025	Aron Pálmarsson
2025		Ómar Ingi Magnússon

=== Individual all-time records ===
Players still active with national team are highlighted.

==== Most matches played ====
Player	Matches	Goals
Guðmundur Hrafnkelsson	407	0
Guðjón Valur Sigurðsson	365	1,879
Geir Sveinsson	340	502
Ólafur Stefánsson	330	1,570
Júlíus Jónasson	288	703
Róbert Gunnarsson	276	773
Valdimar Grímsson	271	940
Snorri Steinn Guðjónsson	257	846
Ásgeir Örn Hallgrímsson	255	420
Björgvin Páll Gústavsson	252	21

Last updated: 6 March 2023
Source: Icelandic Handball Association (hsi.is)
Total number of matches played in official competitions only.

==== Most goals scored ====
Player	Goals	Matches	Average
Guðjón Valur Sigurðsson	1,879	365	5.15
Ólafur Stefánsson	1,570	330	4.76
Kristján Arason	1,123	245	4.58
Valdimar Grímsson	940	271	3.47
Snorri Steinn Guðjónsson	846	257	3.29
Róbert Gunnarsson	773	276	2.80
Sigurður Valur Sveinsson	736	242	3.04
Alexander Petersson	726	186	3.90
Júlíus Jónasson	703	288	2.44
Patrekur Jóhannesson	634	241	2.63

Last updated: 26 January 2021
Source: Icelandic Handball Association (hsi.is)
Total number of goals scored in official matches only.

== Record against Nordic countries ==
All games, including European Championships, World Championships and Olympic Games.

Opponent	Played	Win	Draw	Lost
Denmark	107	35	15	55
Faroe Islands	13	12	0	1
Finland	13	9	3	1
Greenland	3	3	0	0
Norway	88	41	15	29
Sweden	67	10	3	54

Last updated: 2 January 2016
Source: Icelandic Handball Association (hsi.is)

== Kit suppliers ==
Since 2024, Iceland's kits have been supplied by Adidas
