= HSG Düsseldorf =

German handball club

- Full name: Allgemeiner Rather Turnverein 77/90 Düsseldorf e. V.
- Nickname(s): HSG
- Founded: 2000
- Arena: Burg-Wächter Castello
- Capacity: 3,400
- President: -
- Head coach: -
- League: -
- Club colours
Home	Away

HSG Düsseldorf was a German handball team from Düsseldorf. In was founded in 2000 by a fusion of Allgemeinen Rather Turnverein and HSV Düsseldorf. It overtook the license of HSV Düsseldorf and thus played in the Bundesliga until 2010. On December 2011 company behind the team declared insolvency.

Prior to the 2017-18 season the team was fused with Neusser HV and became HSG Neuss/Düsseldorf. Afterwards the team played two seasons in the second Bundesliga under the name Rhein Vikings. In January 2020 Rhein Vikings declared bankruptcy.
