= KA Handball =

Icelandic handball team

Knattspyrnufélag Akureyrar
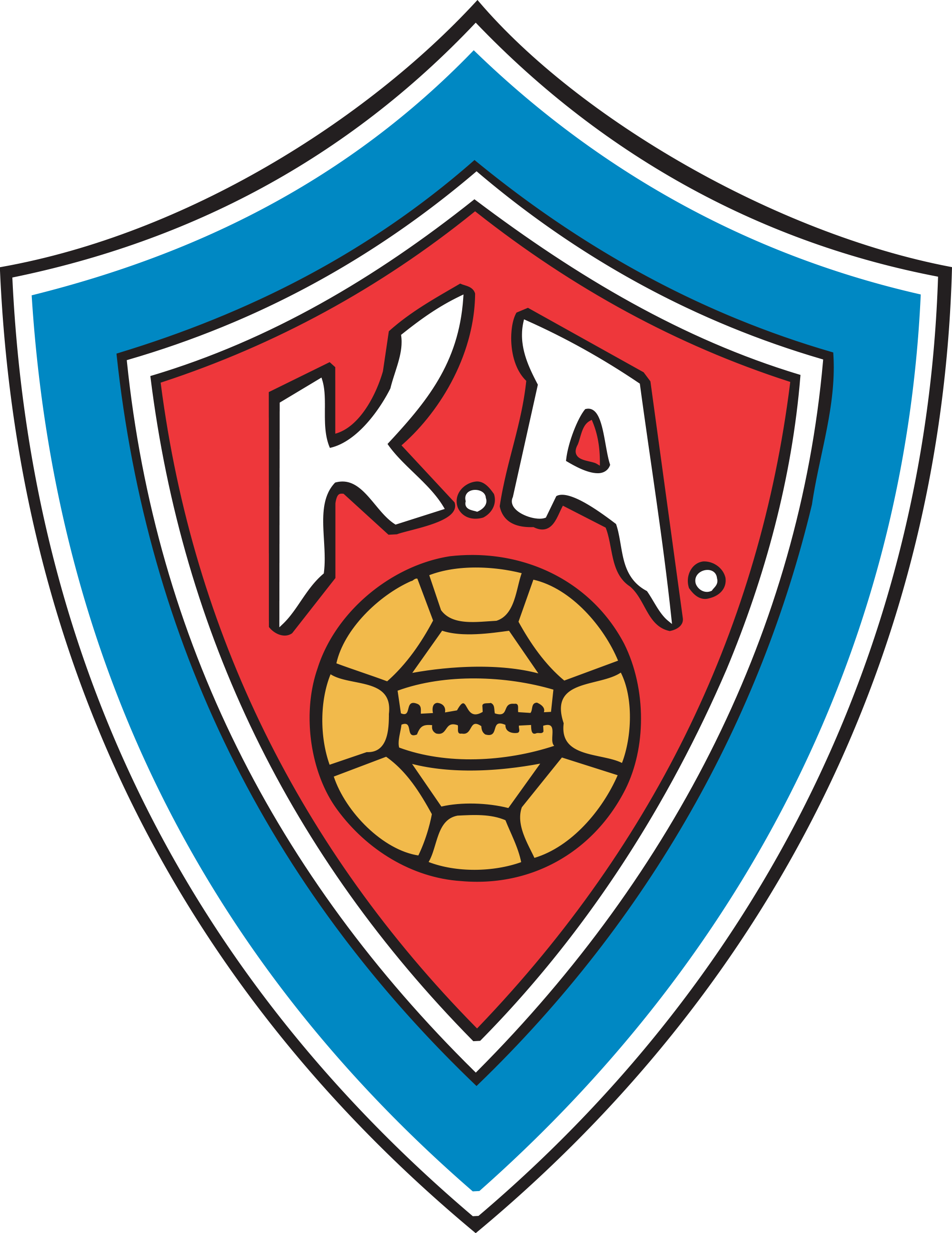
- Full name: Knattspyrnufélag Akureyrar
- Short name: KA
- Founded: 1928
- Arena: KA heimilið
- Capacity: 1,200
- President: Jón Heiðar Sigurðsson
- Head coach: Andri Snær Stefánsson
- League: Úrvalsdeild karla
- 2024/2025: 9th
- Club colours
Home	Away

Knattspyrnufélag Akureyrar is the handball section of Icelandic sports club KA from Akureyri. The team currently competes in the Úrvalsdeild karla, the top tier of handball in Iceland. They play their home matches at KA-heimilið. The team enjoyed a successful period in the late 90's and early 2000s becoming league Champions three times, cup winners three times and champions of Iceland two times.

== History ==
=== The Alfreð Gíslason era (1991-1997) ===
In 1991 former KA player Alfreð Gíslason took charge of the team, he would lead the team to its most successful period in its history. The 1994–95 Season marked a significant chapter in the history of KA handball club. KA had strong players in Valdimar Grímsson and goalkeeper Sigmar Þröstur but now they were joined by one of the nation's most promising handball players, Patrekur Jóhannesson. The highlight of the season was the intense cup final against Valur. The match went into double overtime, with KA emerging victorious with a score of 27-26, claiming their first cup title. Patrekur Jóhannesson scored 11 goals for KA in the match. Valur got their revenge by beating KA in the final to become Icelandic champions. The following season Valdimar Grímsson would depart however there were notable acquisitions in Julian Duranona and Guðmundur Arnar Jónsson. KA made its European debut, the season culminated in triumphs, including a cup victory over Víkingur and the club's first league title. However, the team lost to Valur in the final playoff game to become Icelandic champions. Individual honors went to Julian Duranona as top scorer and Patrekur Jóhannesson as best defensive player. After the season Patrekur Jóhannesson would leave to Tusem Essen in his place KA would acquire the talents of Belarusian, Sergei Ziza.

In the 1996-1997 season, KA performs well in European matches, winning the series against Amiticia and Herstal and then with a notable victory against Fotex Vesprém, despite losing against them in the series. The team finished 3rd in the league and reached the playoff finals this time beating Afturelding to become Icelandic champions for the first time. They reached the cup finals for the fourth consecutive year, however, they lost to Haukar. Julian Duranona and Ziza shine throughout the season. At the end of the season Alfreð Gíslason departs, which marks the end of an era, but KA looks ahead with optimism, focusing on youth development and the continued success of the club. The KA club house and home-ground (KA-heimilið) becomes an integral part of the team's success, fostering a unique atmosphere during matches.

=== Becoming Icelandic champions for the 2nd time (1997-2006) ===
Alfreð's successor was Atli Hilmarsson. In his first season, 1997-1998, he would lead the team clinch the league title for the second time in their history. KA's success was unexpected to many, as they had undergone significant changes since last season. A key to KA's success at this time was the arrival of Guðjón Valur Sigurðsson in 1998, who came from Grótta's academy but had yet to play in the first teams. He would prove to be very successful winning the league's award for best player in 2000 and 2001. In the 2000-01 season, KA managed to become league champions for the third time and came second in the playoffs finals.

In 2002, the KA team reached he final of playoffs in a match against Valur for the Icelandic handball championship. The KA team lost the first two games and was therefore in a very difficult position as Valur only needed one more win to secure the title. However, KA won the next two matches and forced a tiebreaker. The game ended with a KA victory bringing them their second Icelandic champions title, with player Halldór Jóhann Sigfússon being key to KA's success. Atli Hilmarsson had declared that this would be his last season as manager.

From 2002 to 2005, Jóhannes Gunnar Bjarnason managed KA, with the team experiencing less success compared to previous years. A highlight was their victory against Fram in the Icelandic cup in 2004, securing KA's third cup win. Andrius Stelmokas was named the league's best player in 2003, while young Arnór Atlason emerged as a key player, winning both the best player and best young player awards in 2004.

=== Akureyri Handball club (2006-2017) ===
From 2006 to 2017, KA and rival team from Akureyri, Þór, fielded a joint first-team in the Úrvalsdeild karla, the team was called Akureyri Handboltafélag. The team achieved its best result in 2011 finishing as the runner-up in the Icelandic Cup and reaching the Úrvalsdeild finals where it lost to FH. In 2017, the club was relegated from the Úrvalsdeild and shortly after, KA decided to break off from the cooperation and field their own team starting from 2017–2018.

=== KA's handball section reinstated (2017-) ===
In 2017, KA resumed playing under its own emblem in men's handball after competing under the banner of Akureyri Handboltafélag since 2006. Stefán Árnason coached the men's championship team, competing in the second division. They secured second place in the league, earning a spot in the top flight.

Over the following years, the team established itself in the top tier, albeit with mixed results. In their inaugural two seasons, they secured 9th place in 2018/19 and 10th place in 2019/2020. In the 2020/21 season Jónatan Magnússon took solely over as manager of the team. KA finished 6th in the league, marking their first playoff qualification since their reinstatement. However, they were eliminated by Valur in the first round, ending their playoff journey. Árni Bragi Eyjólfsson, a KA player, had an outstanding season, winning the league's Best Player award and finishing as the top scorer. The subsequent season saw KA secure 7th place, only to be knocked out in the first round by Haukar. This marked the second consecutive season where a KA player claimed the league's top scorer title, this time being Óðinn Þór Ríkharðsson. In the cup competition that year, KA enjoyed success, reaching the final but ultimately losing to Valur. Moving on to the 2022/23 season, KA competed in the EHF European Cup, exiting in the first round against HC Fivers. Domestically, the team battled relegation, finishing 10th in the league, ultimately parting ways with manager Jónatan Magnússon. For the third consecutive year in a row a KA player was the top scorer in the league as Einar Rafn Eiðsson claimed the title.

In 2023 Halldór Stefán Haraldsson was appointed head-coach of the team.

== Trophies ==
- Icelandic Championships (2):
  - Gold: 1997, 2002
- Icelandic Cup: (3):
  - Gold: 1995, 1996, 2004
  - Silver: 1997, 2022
- Icelandic League Cup : (3):
  - Gold: 1996, 1998, 2001

== Team ==
=== Current squad ===
Squad for the 2025–26 season

Goalkeepers

- 16 (Iceland) Ágúst Elí Björgvinsson
- 23 (Iceland) Bruno Bernat
- 27 (Iceland) Guðmundur Helgi Imsland

Left Wingers

- 3 (Iceland) Dagur Gautason
- 21 (Iceland) Logi Gautason
- 33 (Iceland) Jóhann Geir Sævarsson

Right Wingers

- 71 (Georgia (country)) Giorgi Arvelodi Dikhaminjia

Line players

- 22 (Iceland) Jens Bragi Bergþórsson
- 28 (Iceland) Einar Birgir Stefánsson

Left Backs

- 14 (Iceland) Bjarni Ófeigur Valdimarsson
- 31 (Iceland) Ari Valur Atlason

Central Backs

- 4 (Iceland) Patrekur Stefánsson
- 6 (Iceland) Arnór Ísak Haddsson
- 7 (Iceland) Magnús Dagur Jónatansson
- 45 (Iceland) Aron Daði Stefánsson

Right Backs

- 2 (Norway) Morten Boe Linder
- 13 (Iceland) Einar Rafn Eiðsson

Defensive players

- 5 (Iceland) Daði Jónsson
- 18 (Iceland) Daníel Matthíasson

=== Technical staff ===
- Head Coach: (Iceland) Andri Snær Stefánsson
- Assistant coach: (Iceland) Einar Rafn Eiðsson

=== Transfers ===
Transfers for the 2026–27 season

Joining

- (Iceland) Dagur Gautason (LW) from (Norway) ØIF Arendal

Leaving

=== Transfer History ===
Transfers for the 2025–26 season

Joining

- (Georgia (country)) Giorgi Dikhaminjia (RW) from (Poland) KS Azoty-Puławy
- (Iceland) Morten Boe Linder (RW) from (Norway) Fjellhammer

Leaving

- (Estonia) Ott Varik (RW) to (Estonia) Viljandi HC
- (Norway) Nicolai Horntvedt Kristensen (GK) to (Sweden) Eskilstuna Guif

=== Notable former players ===
- (Iceland) Guðjón Valur Sigurðsson
- (Iceland) Arnór Atlason
- (Iceland) Alfreð Gíslason
- (Iceland) Sverre Andreas Jakobsson
- (Lithuania) Andrius Stelmokas
- (Russia) Sergey Zisa
- (Iceland) Erlingur Kristjánsson
- (Iceland) Patrekur Jóhannesson
- (Cuba) (Iceland) Roberto Julián Duranona
- (Iceland) Valdimar Grímsson
- (Iceland) Óðinn Þór Ríkharðsson

== Player of the Season ==
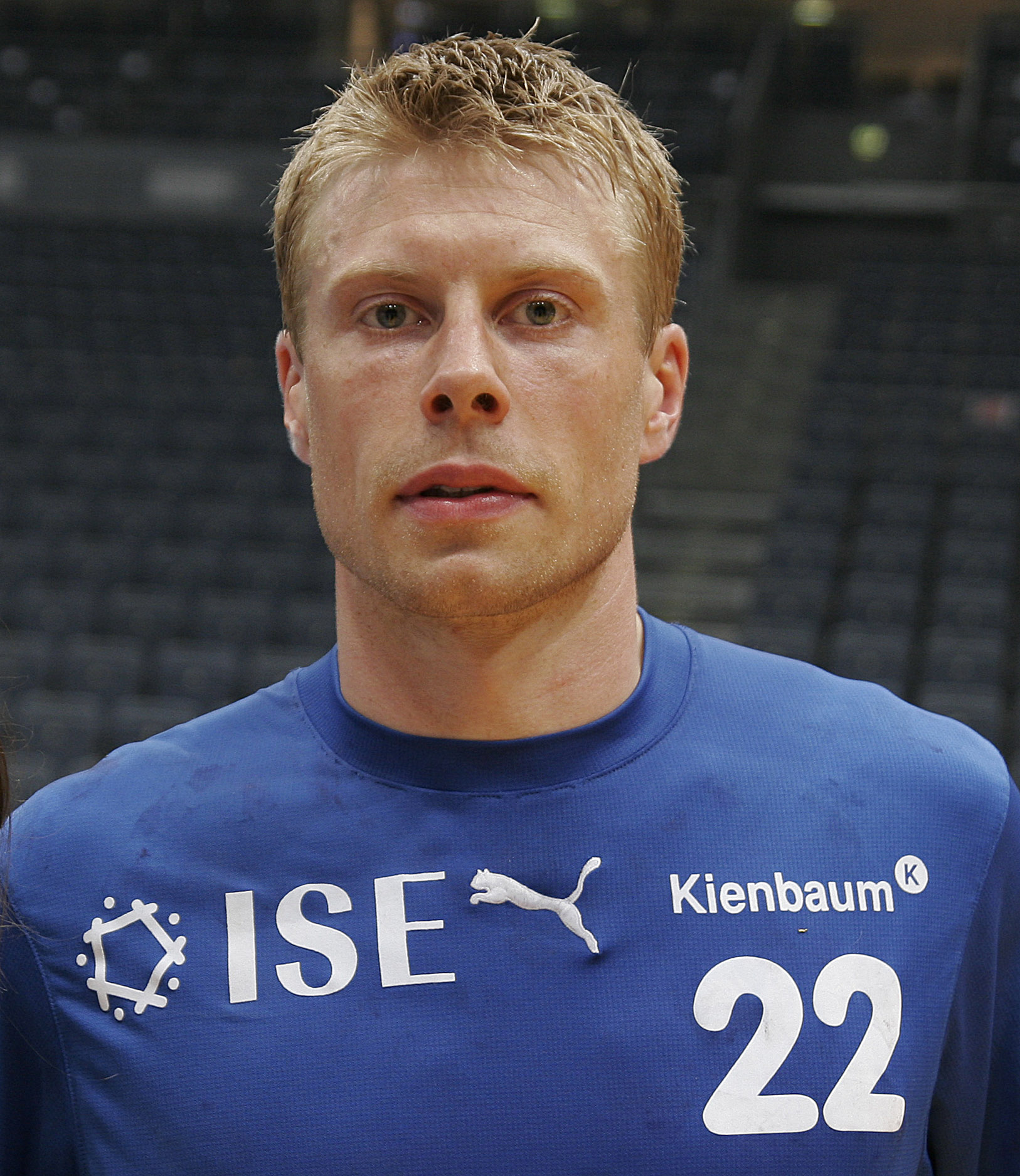
Guðjón Valur Sigurðsson, two-time winner of the award

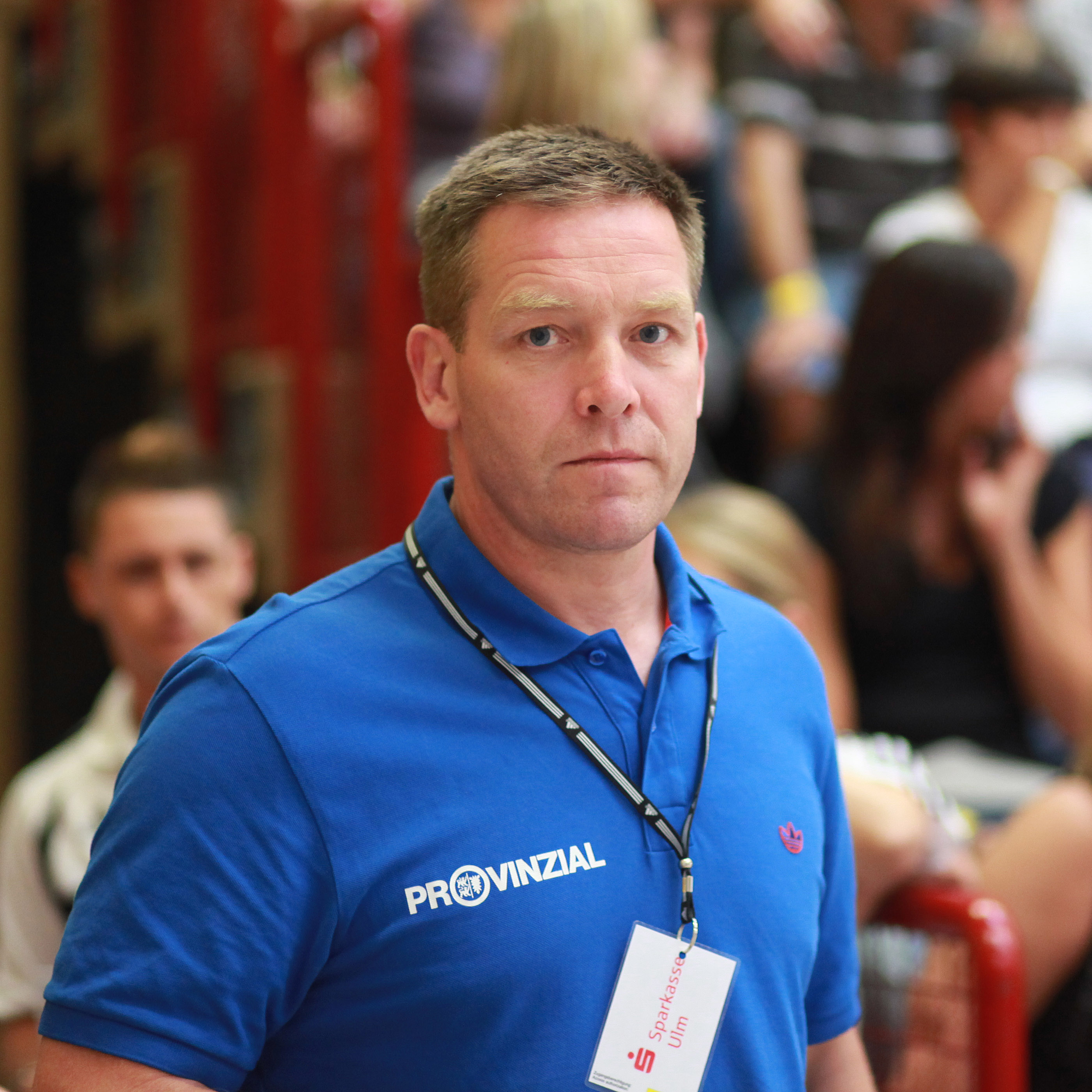
Alfreð Gíslason, won the award in 1993

Season	Name	Nationality	Position
1992-1993	Alfreð Gíslason	Iceland	Left back
1993-1994	Valdimar Grímsson	Iceland	Right wing
1994-1995	Patrekur Jóhannesson	Iceland	Left back
1995-1996	Roberto Julián Duranona	Cuba	Left back
1996-1997	Björgvin Þór Björgvinsson	Iceland	Left wing
1997-1998	Sigtryggur Albertsson	Iceland	Goalkeeper
1998-1999	Lars Walther	Denmark	Right back
1999-2000	Guðjón Valur Sigurðsson	Iceland	Left wing
2000-2001	Guðjón Valur Sigurðsson (2)	Iceland	Left wing
2001-2002	Andrius Stelmokas	Lithuania	Pivot
2002-2003	Jónatan Magnússon	Iceland	Centre back
2003-2004	Arnór Atlason	Iceland	Left back
2004-2005	Halldór Jóhann Sigfússon	Iceland	Centre back
2005-2006	Jónatan Magnússon (2)	Iceland	Centre back
2017-2018	Áki Egilsnes	Faroe Islands	Right back
2018-2019	Áki Egilsnes (2)	Faroe Islands	Right back
2019-2020	Andri Snær Stefánsson	Iceland	Left wing
2020-2021	Árni Bragi Eyjólfsson	Iceland	Right back
2021-2022	Óðinn Þór Ríkharðsson	Iceland	Right wing
2022-2023	Einar Rafn Eiðsson	Iceland	Right back
2023-2024	Einar Rafn Eiðsson (2)	Iceland	Right back
2024-2025	Dagur Árni Heimisson	Iceland	Centre back

== Recent history ==
Season		Pos.	Pl.	W	D	L	GS	GA	P	Playoffs	Cup	Notes
1994-95	Úrvalsdeild	6	22	10	6	6	544	506	26	Runner-up	Champions	
1995-96	Úrvalsdeild	1	22	18	2	2	612	552	38	Runner-up	Champions	EHF Cup 2. round
1996-97	Úrvalsdeild	3	22	13	1	8	575	562	27	Champions	Final	EHF Cup Quarter finals
1997-98	Úrvalsdeild	1	22	13	4	5	606	538	30	Semi-finals	First round	EHF CL Group Stage
1998-99	Úrvalsdeild	6	22	11	0	11	574	558	22	Quarter finals	Quarter-finals	
1999-00	Úrvalsdeild	2	22	12	4	6	578	499	28	Semi-finals	Second round	
2000-01	Úrvalsdeild	1	22	16	0	6	573	527	32	Runner-up	Quarter-finals	
2001-02	Úrvalsdeild	5	26	11	8	7	677	629	30	Champions	Quarter-finals	
2002-03	Úrvalsdeild	4	26	17	3	6	719	658	37	Semi-finals	Second round	
2003-04	Úrvalsdeild	6	14	7	0	7	439	437	14	Semi-finals	Champions	
2004-05	Úrvalsdeild	6	14	5	3	6	412	417	13	Quarter finals	Quarter-finals	
2005-06	Úrvalsdeild	6	26	12	3	11	731	717	27		Second round	EHF Challenge Cup 2.round
2017-18	1.deild	↑ 2	18	15	0	3	457	369	30		Second round	Promoted to Úrvalsdeild
2018-19	Úrvalsdeild	9	22	7	3	12	570	591	17		First round	
2019-20	Úrvalsdeild	10	20	5	1	14	524	581	11		Second round	
2020-21	Úrvalsdeild	6	22	9	7	6	587	571	25	First round	Third round	
2021-22	Úrvalsdeild	7	22	9	2	11	604	630	20	First round	Final	
2022-23	Úrvalsdeild	10	22	5	3	14	634	680	13		Second round	EHF European Cup 1.round
2023-24	Úrvalsdeild	8	22	8	2	12	628	657	18	First round	Third round	
2024-25	Úrvalsdeild	9	22	6	3	13	638	690	15		Third round	

== European record ==
Competition	Matches	W	D	L	GF	GA
EHF Champions League	8	2	0	6	183	216
EHF Cup Winners' Cup	10	4	3	3	266	267
EHF Challenge Cup	4	3	0	1	148	75
EHF European Cup	2	1	0	1	56	59

=== Matches ===
Season	Competition	Round	Opponents	1st leg	2nd leg	Aggregate
1995-1996	EHF Cup Winners' Cup	1R	(Norway) Viking HK	24–23	27–20	50–44
1995-1996	EHF Cup Winners' Cup	2R	(Slovakia) TJ VSZ Kosice	33–28	31–24	57–59
1996-1997	EHF Cup Winners' Cup	1R	(Austria) Amicitia Zürich	27–27	29–29	56–56
1996-1997	EHF Cup Winners' Cup	2R	(Belgium) HC Herstal	26–20	23–23	49–43
1996-1997	EHF Cup Winners' Cup	QF	(Hungary) Veszprém	32–31	34–22	54–65
1997-1998	EHF Champions League	PR	(Lithuania) Granitas Kaunas	27–23	28–19	51–46
1997-1998	EHF Champions League	GS	(Slovenia) RK Celje	23–26	31–18	41–57
1997-1998	EHF Champions League	GS	(Croatia) RK Zagreb	36–23	23–28	46–64
1997-1998	EHF Champions League	GS	(Italy) Generali Trieste	30–24	21–19	45–49
2005-2006	EHF Challenge Cup	1R	(Georgia (country)) Mamuli Tbilisi	50–15	15–45	95–30
2005-2006	EHF Challenge Cup	2R	(Romania) CSA Steaua București	24–23	30–21	45–53
2022-2023	EHF European Cup	1R	(Austria) HC Fivers	29–30	30–26	59–56

Notes

- PR: Preliminary Round
- 1R: First round
- 2R: Second round
- QF: Quarter finals
- GS: Group stage

== Managerial History ==
- (Iceland) Birgir Björnsson (1978–82)
- (Denmark) Jan Larsen (1982–83)
- (Iceland) Birgir Björnsson (1984–85)
- (Serbia) Ljubo Lazic (1985–86)
- (Iceland) Brynjar Kvaran (1986-1988)
- (Croatia) Ivan Duranec (1988-1989)
- (Iceland) Erlingur Kristjánsson (1989-1991)
- (Iceland) Alfreð Gíslason (1991-1997)
- (Iceland) Atli Hilmarsson (1997-2002)
- (Iceland) Jóhannes Gunnar Bjarnason (2002-2005)
- (Iceland) Reynir Stefánsson (2005-2006)
- (Iceland) Stefán Árnason and Heimir Örn Árnason (2017-2019)
- (Iceland) Stefán Árnason and Jónatan Magnússon (2019-2020)
- (Iceland) Jónatan Magnússon (2020-2023)
- (Iceland) Halldór Stefán Haraldsson (2023-2025)
- (Iceland) Andri Snær Stefánsson (2025-)

== Kit ==
Period	Kit manufacturer
1995–1996	Adidas
1996–1999	Nike
1999–2002	Puma
2003–2006	Hummel
2017–2018	Diadora
2018–2022	Hummel
2022–	Macron
