= Knattspyrnufélagið Hörður =

- Full name: Knattspyrnufélagið Hörður
- Nickname: Harðverjar, Hörður Ísafjörður
- Short name: Hörður
- Sport: Football; Handball; Icelandic wrestling
- Founded: 27 May 1919; 107 years ago
- Based in: Ísafjörður
- Colours: Red, White, blue, gold

Knattspyrnufélagið Hörður (Icelandic pronunciation: [ˈkʰnahtˌspɪ(r)tnʏˌfjɛːˌlaijɪð ˈhœrðʏr̥], lit. 'Hörður Football Club' (Note: Knattspyrnufélagið is the definite form of Knattspyrnufélag, meaning "the football club".)), commonly known as Hörður or Hörður Ísafjörður, is an Icelandic multi-sport club from the town of Ísafjörður. It was founded in 1919 as a football club but since 1933 it has fielded other departments, most prominently in handball, track & field, skiing and Icelandic wrestling.

== History ==
Knattspyrnufélagið Hörður was founded on 27 May 1919 as a football club with Þórhallur Leósson being its first chairman. Its first official game was against Fótboltafélag Ísafjarðar on 17 June 1921. In 1933 it started a department in women's Handball and in 1937 a track & field department. At its peak in the 1940s it was the largest sports club in the Westfjords.

== Football ==
Knattspyrnufélagið Hörður
- Full name: Knattspyrnufélagið Hörður
- Ground: Torfnesvöllur, Ísafjörður
- Capacity: 1,596
- Chairman: Axel Sveinsson
- League: 5. deild karla Group A
- 2024: 5. deild karla Group B, 4th of 9

=== Recent history ===
Despite not competing in the league competition, Hörður reached the final 8 of the men's cup competition in 1970 where it lost to Fram.

After not fielding a senior team in league competition since 1940, Hörður sent a men's team to the 4. deild karla in 2014 where it finished 4th in A-group. On 1 June 2017, it defeated Snæfell/UDN 14–1 on Olísvöllurinn in Ísafjörður. On 3 June 2018, the team mounted an improbable comeback victory against Hvíti Riddarinn by scoring three goals in the last two minutes of the match, winning 6–5. In the 2021 season Sigurður "Siggi" Hannesson became the top goalscorer in all the Icelandic league divisions scoring 24 goals in 14 matches.

=== Seasons ===
Results of league and cup competitions by season
Season	Division	P	W	D	L	F	A	Pts	Pos	Icelandic Cup	Name	Goals
Season	League									Icelandic Cup	Top goalscorer	
2014	4. deild Group A	12	5	1	6	25	26	16	4th	n/a	Hinrik Elís Jónsson	7
2015	4. deild Group C	12	6	2	4	25	25	20	3rd	R1	Hinrik Elís Jónsson	10
2016	4. deild Group A	12	5	0	7	19	26	15	4th	R1	Ásgeir Hinrik Gíslason	4
2017	4. deild Group A	14	7	3	4	64	38	24	5th	n/a	Magnús Ingi Einarsson	8
2018	4. deild Group B	14	3	0	11	24	59	9	7th	R1	Hjalti Hermann Gíslason	6
2019	4. deild Group C	14	5	2	7	25	29	17	5th	R1	Hjalti Hermann Gíslason	8
2020	4. deild Group D	14	3	1	10	33	43	10	7th	R1	Sigurður Arnar Hannesson	19
2021	4. deild Group C	16	11	1	4	68	30	34	4th	R1	Sigurður Arnar Hannesson	24
2022	4. deild Group A	14	5	0	9	34	53	15	6th	R1	Sigurður Arnar Hannesson	14
2023	5. deild Group A	13	5	2	6	38	30	17	6th	R1	Sigurður Arnar Hannesson	7

=== Appearances ===
Competitive matches only since 2014. Correct as of 31 July 2023.

	Name	Date of birth	Years	League	Cup	League Cup	Total
1	(Iceland) Dagur Elí Ragnarsson	19 September 1996 (age 30)	2015–	101	6	22	129
2	(Iceland) Einar Óli Guðmundsson	29 September 1998 (age 28)	2016–	102	6	17	125
3	(Iceland) (Sweden) Felix Rein Grétarsson	10 January 1997 (age 29)	2015–	86	4	12	102
4	(Iceland) Sigþór Snorrason	31 January 1985 (age 41)	2015–2022	70	5	17	92
5	(Iceland) Sigurður Arnar Hannesson	5 August 1999 (age 27)	2017–2019 & 2020–	69	4	9	82

=== Goalscorers ===
Competitive matches only since 2014. Correct as of 31 July 2023.

	Name	Date of birth	Years	League	Cup	League Cup	Total
1	(Iceland) Sigurður Arnar Hannesson	5 August 1999 (age 27)	2017–2019 & 2020–	71	0	4	75
2	(Iceland) (Sweden) Felix Rein Grétarsson	10 January 1997 (age 29)	2015–	27	0	3	30
3	(Iceland) Hinrik Elís Jónsson	2 August 1994 (age 32)	2014–2018	28	0	0	28
4	(Iceland) Birkir Eydal	3 June 2000 (age 26)	2017, 2018, 2020, 2021 & 2023–	26	0	0	26
5	(Iceland) (Republic of Ireland) Jóhann Samuel Rendall	1 April 2004 (age 22)	2020–	19	0	5	24

=== Former notable players ===
Players who have played for Knattspyrnufélagið Hörður and earned caps in Besta-deild karla. Correct as of 21 July 2022.

Nat.	Player	Date of birth	Current club	Position	Úrvalsdeild karla team/s	Úrvalsdeild karla career
(Iceland)	Hrafn Davíðsson	30 October 1984 (age 41)	retired	Goalkeeper	Fjölnir & ÍBV	2005–2006 & 2008–2009
(Iceland)	Magnús Ingi Einarsson	12 June 1994 (age 32)	Árborg	Forward	Selfoss	2012
(Iceland)	Ólafur Jón Jónsson	18 June 1987 (age 39)	retired	Forward	Keflavík	2004–2006
(Iceland)	Pétur Georg Markan	4 February 1981 (age 45)	retired	Forward	Fjölnir, Valur & Víkingur R.	2008–2009 & 2011
(Iceland)	Þorsteinn Ingason	12 April 1988 (age 38)	retired	Forward	Þór	2011

=== Kit ===
Years	Kit manufacturer
2014–2019	Henson
2019–	Macron

== Handball ==
Hörður
- Arena: Ísjakinn
- Capacity: 900
- President: Vigdís Pála Halldórsdóttir
- Head coach: Carlos Martin Santos
- League: Olís deild karla

Hörður has periodically fielded a men's handball team during its history. In February 2020, Þór Akureyri demanded that Hörður would pay 400.000 ISK in travel expense of Þór's trip to Ísafjörður for their September game in the Icelandic Cup. In the Cup, teams split all the income and cost of games, including travel expense of the away team, and Þór stated that their total travel expense was 800.000 ISK. The board of Hörður strongly objected as its own travel expense to Akureyri in January where they faced Þór's reserve team had not exceeded 120.000 ISK. Two days later, the clubs reached an undisclosed settlement and the Icelandic Handball Association announced it would review its rules regarding the settlement of cup games.

Although it finished last in the third-tier 2. deild karla in 2019–20, Hörður was offered a seat in the second tier 1. deild karla for the 2020–21 season where they finished in 8th place.

In July 2021, the club signed Japanese national team player and Olympian Kenya Kasahara. On 8 April 2022 the team won the second-tier 1. deild karla and achieved promotion to the top-tier Úrvalsdeild karla for the first time in its history. After one season in the Úrvalsdeild, Hörður was relegated back to 1. deild after failing to register a win in the league.

=== Honours ===
- 1. deild karla (2022)

=== Notable players ===
Criteria

To appear in this section a player must have either:

- Set a club record or won an individual award while at the club.
- Played at least one official international match for their national team at any time.

- (Russia) Alexander Tatarintsev
- (Latvia) Guntis Pilpuks
- (Japan) Kenya Kasahara
- (Latvia) Roland Lebedevs
- (Turkey) Tuğberk Çatkın
- (Latvia) Endijs Kusners
