= Stiven Tobar Valencia =

Colombian-Icelandic handballer (born 2000)

Personal information
- Nationality: Icelandic
- Born: 27 October 2000 (age 25) Cali, Valle del Cauca, Colombia
- Height: 182 cm (72 in)

Sport
- Sport: Handball
- Position: Left wing
- Current club: S.L. Benfica
- Number: 7

Senior clubs
- Years: Team
- –2023: Valur
- 2023–: S.L. Benfica
National team
Years	Team	Apps	(Gls)
2023–	Iceland	4	(6)
- Updated on 25 June 2023

Stiven Tobar Valencia (born 27 October 2000) is a Colombian-born Icelandic handball player who plays for S.L. Benfica and the Icelandic national team.

He won the Icelandic championship as a member of Valur in 2021 and 2022.

== Early life ==
Stiven was born in Colombia but moved with his family to Iceland at the age of three. He started playing handball at the age of eight with Valur's junior teams.

== Playing career ==
Stiven started his career with Valur's senior team in 2017. He had his breakout season in 2021–2022 and helped the team to its second straight national championship and was named the Playoffs MVP. In June 2023, he signed with S.L. Benfica.

== Accomplishments ==
=== Titles ===
- Úrvalsdeild karla: 2021, 2022
- Icelandic Handball Cup: 2021, 2022

=== Awards ===
- Úrvalsdeild karla Playoffs MVP: 2022
