= Dagur Sigurðsson =

Icelandic handball player (born 1973)

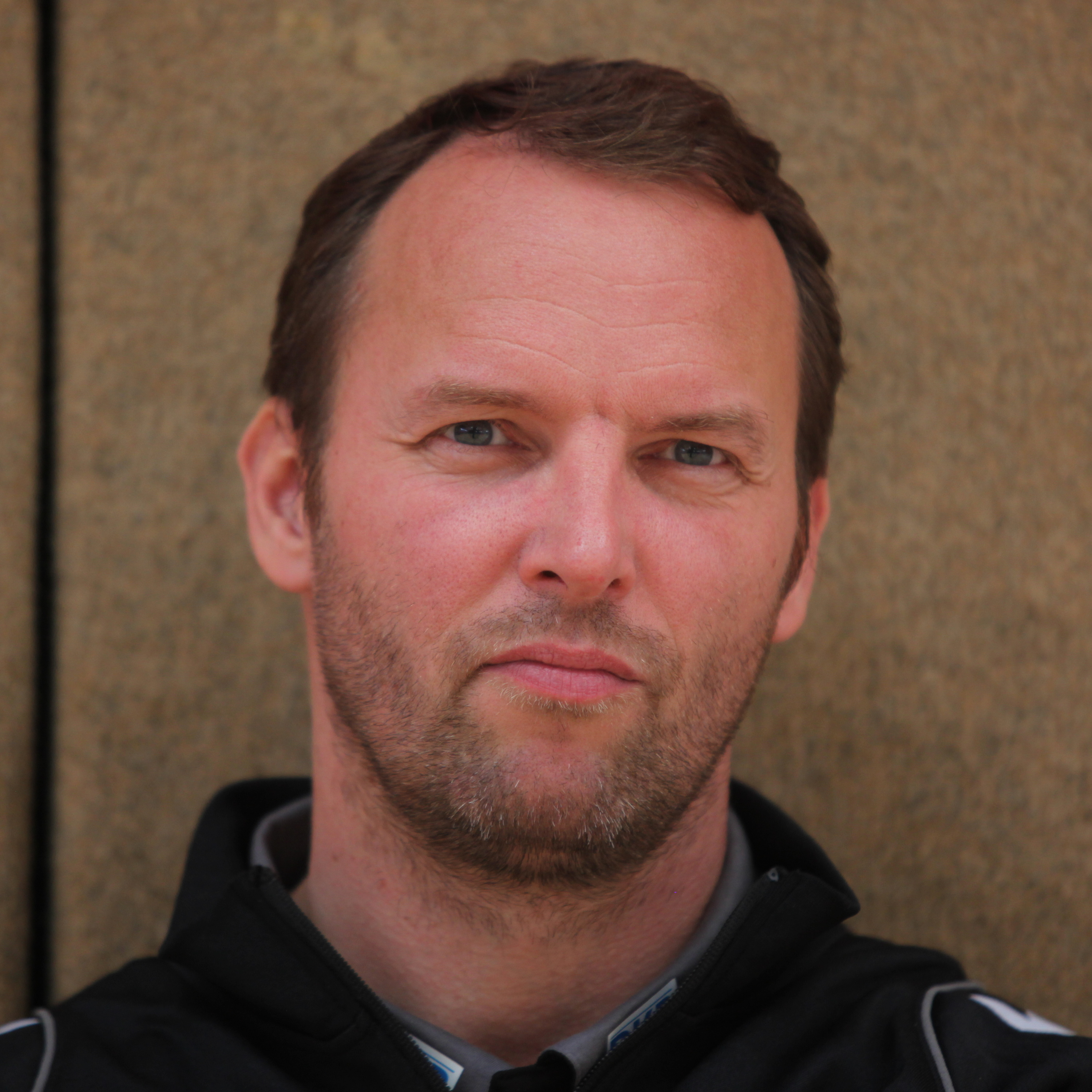
- Dagur Sigurðsson with Füchse Berlin in 2014

Personal information
- Full name: Dagur Sigurðsson
- Nationality: Icelandic
- Born: 3 April 1973 (age 53) Reykjavík, Iceland
- Height: 1.93 m (6 ft 4 in)

Sport
- Sport: Handball
- Position: Centre back
- Current club: Croatia (manager)

Youth career
- Years: Team
- 1987–1990: Valur

Senior clubs
- Years: Team
- 1990–1996: Valur
- 1996–2000: LTV Wuppertal
- 2000–2003: Wakunaga Hiroshima
- 2003–2007: Bregenz
National team
Years	Team	Apps	(Gls)
1992–2005	Iceland	215	(399)

Teams managed
- 2003–2008: Bregenz
- 2008–2010: Austria
- 2009–2015: Füchse Berlin
- 2014–2017: Germany
- 2017–2024: Japan
- 2024–: Croatia
Medal record
Head Coach for Germany
Olympic Games
Bronze medal – third place	2016 Rio de Janeiro	Coach
European Championship
Gold medal – first place	2016 Poland	Coach
Head Coach for Japan
Asian Championship
Silver medal – second place	2024 Bahrain	Coach
Bronze medal – third place	2020 Kuwait	Coach
Head Coach for Croatia
World Championship
Silver medal – second place	2025 Croatia/Denmark/Norway	Coach
European Championship
Bronze medal – third place	2026 Denmark/Norway/Sweden	Coach

Dagur Sigurðsson (born 3 April 1973) is an Icelandic handball coach and former player who is currently the head coach of the Croatian men's national team.

He was the IHF World Coach of the Year in 2015. Dagur was capped 215 times and scored 399 goals for the Icelandic national team. He captained the team from 1999 until his international retirement in 2005 and competed at the 2004 Summer Olympics.

Dagur spent his career playing for clubs in Iceland, Germany and Japan before starting his coaching career in 2003 with Austrian team Bregenz as a player-coach. Dagur later coached Austrian men's national team, German club Füchse Berlin, where he won the DHB-Pokal and EHF Cup, the German men's national team, with whom he won the 2016 European Championship and earned the bronze medal at the 2016 Summer Olympics, and the Japanese men's national team, with whom he placed third and second at the 2020 and 2024 Asian Championship respectively.

Dagur became the head coach of the Croatia men's national handball team in February 2024 and led the team to a second-place finish at the 2025 World Championship and third-place finish at the 2026 European Championship.

== Club career ==
Dagur began his senior handball career at local club Valur in 1990, having passed through their youth system. He won the Icelandic Championship in his first season with the club, followed by an Icelandic Cup title in 1993 and four consecutive championship titles from 1993 to 1996. Dagur joined newly-formed German club HSG LTV/WSV Wuppertal in 1996, achieving promotion to the Bundesliga in the club's inaugural season, before moving to Japanese team Wakanuga Hiroshima in 2000. Dagur become the player-coach of Austrian club Bregenz in 2003, winning four national championship titles and two cup titles before retiring as a player in 2007.

== International career ==
Dagur made his debut for the Icelandic national handball team in 1992 and was made captain of the team in 1999. He was part of the team that competed at the 2004 Summer Olympics. He also represented Iceland at the 1997 World Championship (5th place) and the 2002 European Championship (4th place). Dagur was capped 215 times and scored 399 goals before retiring from the national team in 2005.

== Coaching career ==
Dagur began his coaching career as a player-coach for Austrian club Bregenz upon his transfer to the club in 2003. Following four consecutive national championship titles, he won a fifth title with the team in his first season after retiring as a player in 2008. That same year, he became the head coach of the Austrian men's national team, before joining German club Füchse Berlin in 2009. Dagur led the Austrian national team to a ninth-place finish at the 2010 European Championship and left the team that year. In 2014, he won the DHB-Pokal with Füchse Berlin, the club's first major trophy, and became the head coach of the German men's national team. Dagur won the EHF Cup with Füchse Berlin in 2015 and left the team following the conclusion of the season.

Dagur won the 2016 European Championship with the German national team and earned the bronze medal at the 2016 Summer Olympics. He left the team in 2017 to coach the Japanese men's national team, finishing third and second at the Asian Championship in 2020 and 2024 respectively.

He became the head coach of the Croatian men's national team in early 2024, which qualified for the 2024 Olympics, finished 9th and then placed second at the 2025 World Championship, losing to Denmark in the final. At the 2026 European Men's Handball Championship, he led Croatia to secure third place and bronze medal, after losing from Germany in semi-finals but winning against Iceland in the 3rd place match.

Before their semifinal against Germany, he criticised the schedule as his team had to play two games in less than 24 hours and then go on a bus to Herning, meaning they had no training day before their semifinal, as well as the fact that the Croatian team as the only semifinalist had to stay in Silkeborg, 40 km away, rather than in Herning. As a response, the EHF acknowledged the criticism and stated that changed will be made in the future.

== Honours ==
=== Player ===
Valur

- Icelandic Championship: 1991, 1993, 1994, 1995, 1996
- Icelandic Cup: 1993

Bregenz

- Austrian Championship: 2004, 2005, 2006, 2007
- Austrian Cup: 2003, 2006

=== Manager ===
Bregenz

- Austrian Championship: 2004, 2005, 2006, 2007, 2008
- Austrian Cup: 2003, 2006

Füchse Berlin

- DHB-Pokal: 2014
- EHF Cup: 2015

Germany

- Olympic Games
  - Bronze: 2016
- European Championship:
  - Gold: 2016

Japan

- Asian Championship:
  - Silver: 2024
  - Bronze: 2020

Croatia

- World Championship:
  - Silver: 2025
- European Championship:
  - Bronze: 2026

Individual

- IHF World Coach of the Year: 2015
