= Alfreð Gíslason =

Icelandic handball player (born 1959)

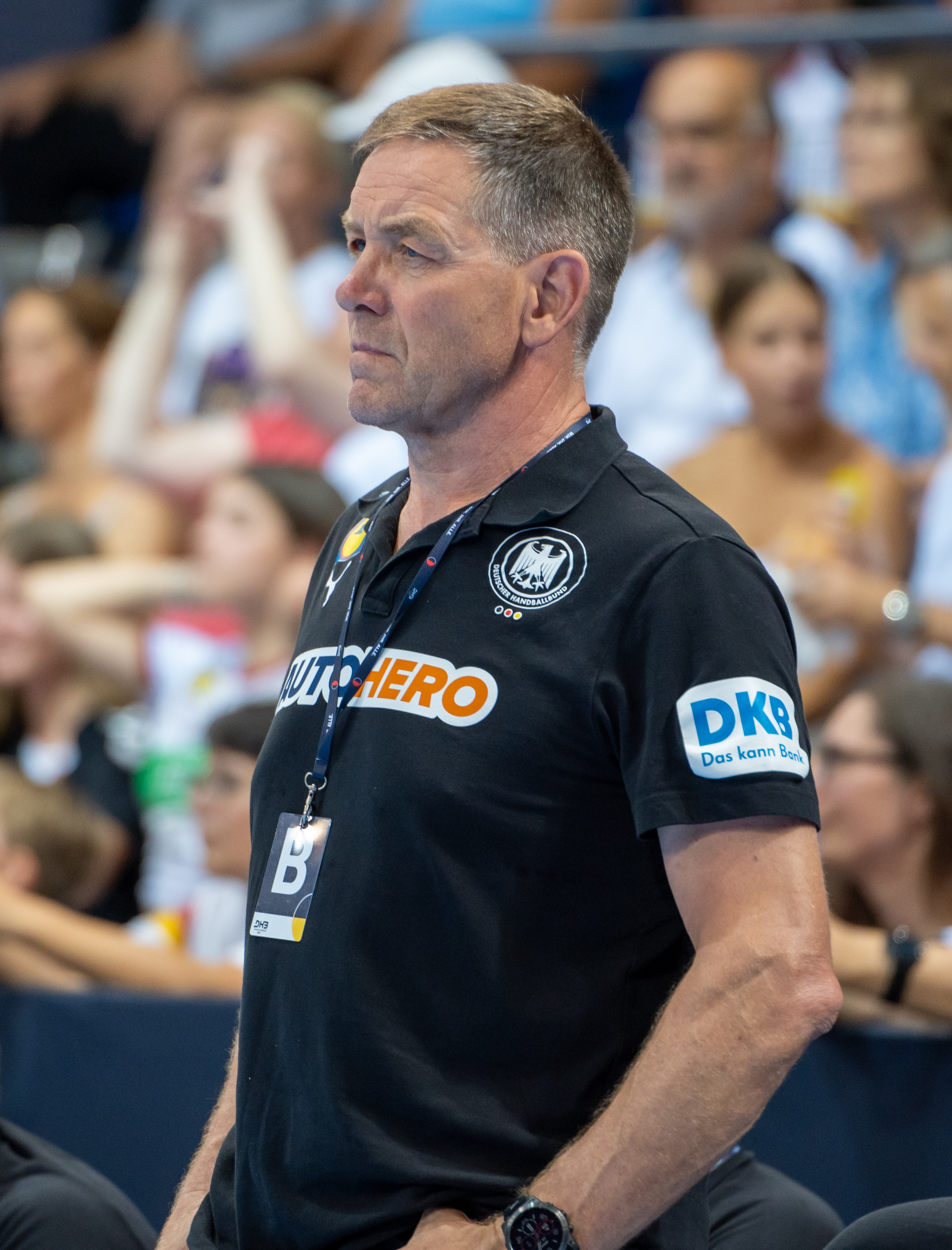
- Gíslason in 2024

Personal information
- Nationality: Icelandic
- Born: 7 September 1959 (age 67) Akureyri, Iceland
- Height: 1.91 m (6 ft 3 in)

Sport
- Sport: Handball
- Position: Left back
- Current club: Germany (manager)

Senior clubs
- Years: Team
- –1980: KA
- 1980–1983: KR
- 1983–1988: TUSEM Essen
- 1988–1989: KR
- 1989–1991: Bidasoa Irún
- 1991–1995: KA
National team
Years	Team	Apps	(Gls)
–	Iceland	190	(542)

Teams managed
- 1991–1997: KA (coach-player)
- 1997–1999: VfL Hameln
- 1999–2006: SC Magdeburg
- 2006–2008: Iceland
- 2006–2008: VfL Gummersbach
- 2008–2019: THW Kiel
- 2020–: Germany
Medal record
Head Coach for Germany
Olympic Games
Silver medal – second place	2024 Paris	Coach
European Championship
Silver medal – second place	2026 Denmark/Norway/Sweden	Coach

Alfreð Gíslason (born 7 September 1959) is an Icelandic handball coach and former player who is currently the head coach of the German men's national team. He won titles in Iceland, Germany and Spain as a player before starting his coaching career in 1991 with Icelandic team KA as a player-coach. He later coached German club SC Magdeburg, where he won the Bundesliga and the EHF Champions League, the Icelandic men's national team and German club THW Kiel, where he won six Bundesliga, six DHB-Pokal and two EHF Champions League titles. Alfreð was the Icelandic Sportsperson of the Year in 1989 and inducted into the National Olympic and Sports Association of Iceland Hall of Fame in 2019.

== Club career ==
Gíslason began his senior handball career at local club KA. In 1980, he transferred to fellow Icelandic team KR, where he spent three years and won the Icelandic Cup in 1982, before moving to German club TUSEM Essen in 1983. Gíslason won the Bundesliga in 1986 and 1987, and the DHB-Pokal in 1988 with the team. He returned to KR in 1988 for one season and later joined Spanish club Bidasosa Irún in 1989, where he won the Copa del Rey during a two-year stint. He returned to KA in 1991 as a player-coach and won the Icelandic Cup in his last season as a player. Gíslason retired after the 1995 season.

== International career ==
Alfreð was capped 190 times and scored 542 goals for the Icelandic national handball team. He competed at the 1984 Summer Olympics and the 1988 Summer Olympics, where Iceland placed sixth and eight, respectively.

== Coaching career ==
Gíslason began his coaching career as a player-coach for Icelandic club KA upon his transfer to the club in 1991. He won the Icelandic Cup in his last season as a player in 1995 and went on to win the cup a second time in the following season, in addition to the Icelandic League Cup. Gíslason won the Icelandic Championships in 1997 and became the coach of German club VfL Hameln that same year. In 1999, he joined Bundesliga team SC Magdeburg, where he won the league, the DHB-Supercup, the EHF Cup and the EHF Supercup in 2001. The team won the EHF Champions League and the EHF Supercup in the following season. From 2006 to 2008, he coached both the Icelandic men's national team and German club VfL Gummersbach. He led the Icelandic national team at the 2007 World Championship and the 2008 European Championship.

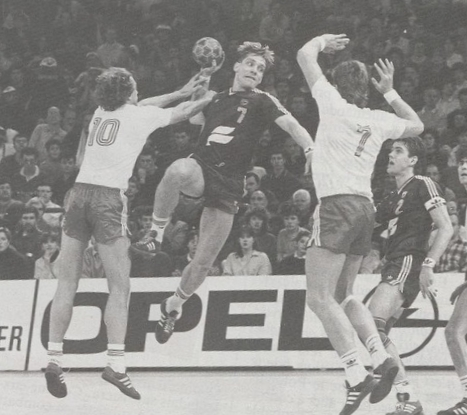
Gíslason with Iceland in 1989

Gíslason became the coach of German club THW Kiel in 2008. He led the team to six Bundesliga and DHB-Pokal titles each, five DHB-Supercup titles, two EHF Champions League titles, and one EHF Cup and IHF Super Globe title each across eleven seasons with the club, in addition to becoming the first coach to win the EHF Champions League with two different teams.

In 2020, Gíslason became the coach of the German men's national team and led the team to a fifth-place finish at the 2020 European Championship. The national team placed sixth at the 2020 Summer Olympics and twelfth at the 2021 World Championship. At the 2022 European Championship, Germany finished seventh, and placed fifth at the 2023 World Championship. Gíslason led the national team to a fourth-place finish at the 2024 European Championship in Germany and won the silver medal in the men's handball tournament at the 2024 Summer Olympics.

At the 2026 European Men's Handball Championship he won silver medals, once again losing to Denmark in the final. In the early stages of the tournament his tactics were widely criticized, especially after the 30-27 defeat against Serbia in the preliminary rounds, when he called a time out just as Juri Knorr was about to score.

== Personal life ==
Gíslason was married to Kara Guðrún Melstað until her death on 31 May 2021.

== Honours ==
=== Player ===
KR

- Icelandic Cup: 1982

TUSEM Essen

- Bundesliga: 1986, 1987
- DHB-Pokal: 1988

Bidasoa Irún

- Copa del Rey: 1991

KA

- Icelandic Cup: 1995

Individual

- Icelandic Sportsperson of the Year: 1989

=== Manager ===
KA

- Icelandic Championships: 1997
- Icelandic Cup: 1995, 1996
- Icelandic League Cup: 1996

SC Magdeburg

- Bundesliga: 2001
- DHB-Supercup: 2001
- EHF Champions League: 2002
- EHF Cup: 2001
- EHF Supercup: 2001, 2002

THW Kiel

- Bundesliga: 2009, 2010, 2012, 2013, 2014, 2015
- DHB-Pokal: 2009, 2011, 2012, 2013, 2017, 2019
- DHB-Supercup: 2008, 2011, 2012, 2014, 2015
- EHF Champions League: 2010, 2012
- EHF Cup: 2019
- IHF Super Globe: 2011

Individual

- Bundesliga Coach of the Season: 2002, 2009, 2012, 2015, 2019
- German Handball Coach of the Year: 2001, 2009, 2011, 2012
- Icelandic Coach of the Year: 2012
