= Kenya Kasahara =

Japanese handball player (born 1988)

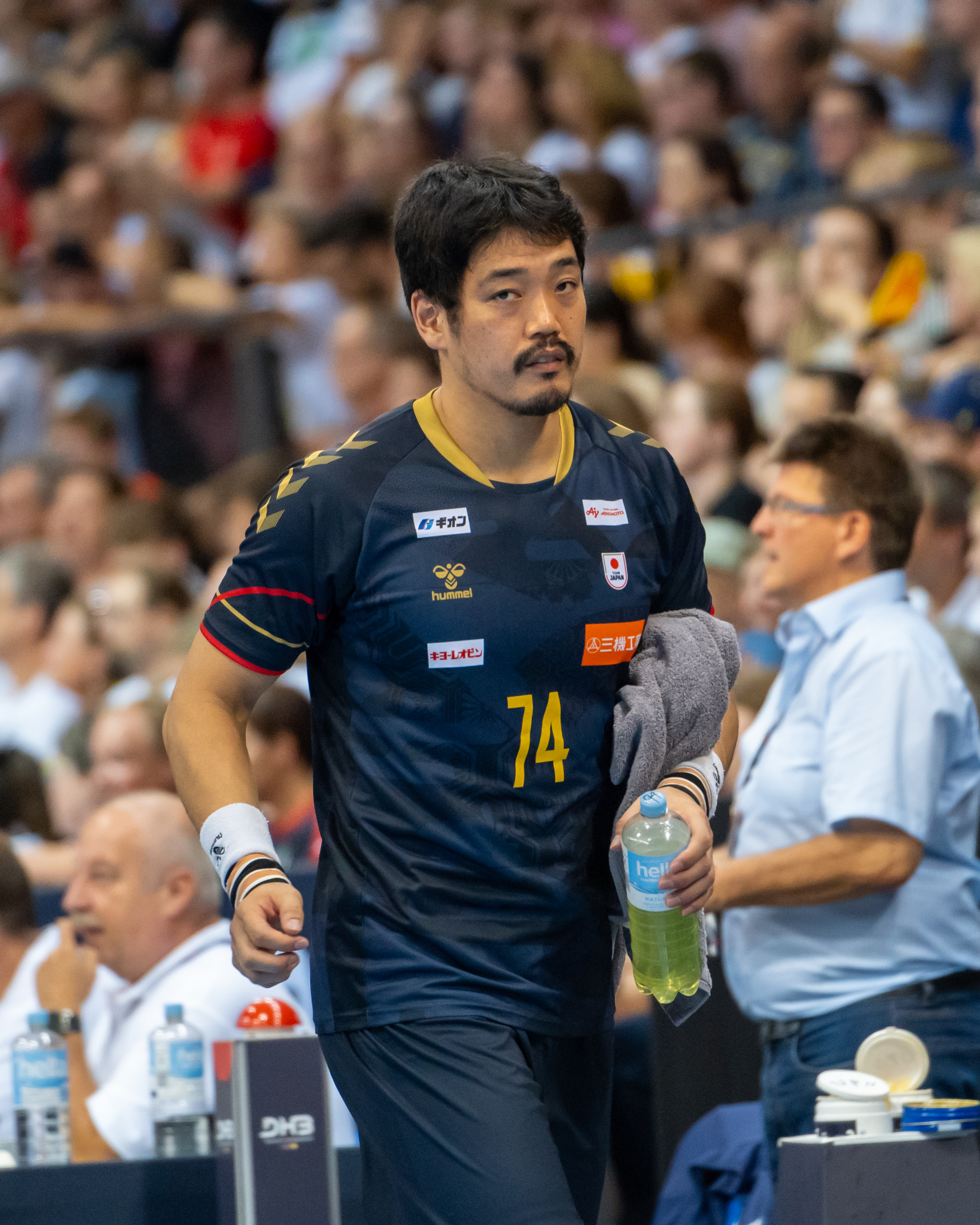

Personal information
- Nationality: Japanese
- Born: 15 May 1988 (age 38)
- Height: 1.96 m (6 ft 5 in)

Sport
- Sport: Handball
- Position: Pivot
- Current club: EarthFriends BM Tokyo-Kanagawa
- Number: 3

Senior clubs
- Years: Team
- –2021: Toyota Auto Body
- 2021–2022: Hörður
- 2022–2023: SPR Tarnów
- 2023–24: Hörður
- 2025-: EarthFriends BM Tokyo-Kanagawa
National team
Years	Team	Apps	(Gls)
–	Japan	46	(29)
Medal record
Asian Championship
Silver medal – second place	2024 Bahrain
Bronze medal – third place	2020 Kuwait

Kenya Kasahara (笠原 謙哉, born 15 May 1988) is a Japanese handball player and a member of the Japanese national team. He represented Japan at the 2019 World Men's Handball Championship and at the 2020 Summer Olympics.

== Club career ==
In July 2021, Kasahara signed with Hörður of the Icelandic 1. deild karla. He helped Hörður finish first in the 1. deild in 2022, and achieve promotion to the top-tier Úrvalsdeild karla.

After spending the 2022–2023 season with SPR Tarnów, he returned to Hörður in July 2023.

== Titles ==
- 1. deild karla: 2022
