= Sverre Andreas Jakobsson =

Icelandic handball player (born 1977)

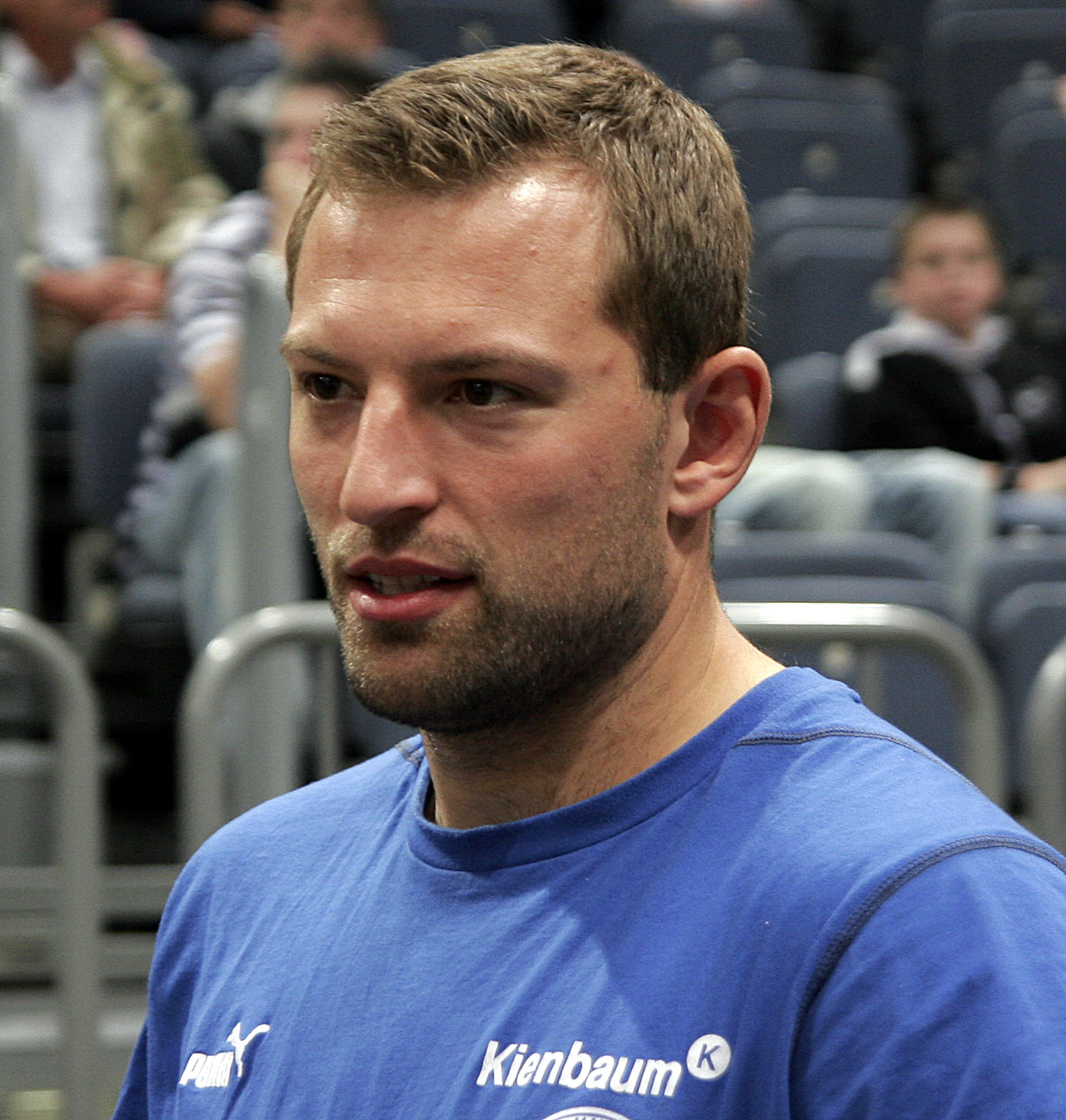

Personal information
- Nationality: Icelandic
- Born: 8 February 1977 (age 49) Oslo, Norway
- Height: 1.96 m (6 ft 5 in)

Sport
- Sport: Handball
- Position: Pivot

Senior clubs
- Years: Team
- –1999: KA
- 1999–2001: HK
- 2001–2003: UMF Afturelding
- 2005: New England Freeze
- 2005–2006: Fram
- 2006–2008: VfL Gummersbach
- 2008–2009: HK
- 2009–2014: TV Grosswallstadt
- 2014–2018: Akureyri Handboltafélag
- 2019: KA
National team
Years	Team	Apps	(Gls)
–	Iceland	182	(27)

Teams managed
- 2014: Akureyri Handboltafélag
- 2015–2018: Akureyri Handboltafélag
- 2019–present: KA (assistant)
Medal record
Olympic Games
Silver medal – second place	2008 Beijing	Team
European Championship
Bronze medal – third place	2010 Austria	Team

Sverre Andreas Jakobsson (born 8 February 1977) is an Icelandic-Norwegian handball manager and former player. With the Icelandic national handball team, he competed at two Olympics, winning the silver medal at the 2008 Olympics.

== Playing career ==
Sverre started his career with KA at the age of 16 and helped the team win the Icelandic Cup in 1995 and the Icelandic championship in 1997. He won the national championship again in 2006 with Fram.

== Coaching career ==
Sverre was hired as player-coach for Akureyri Handboltafélag in 2014.

In 2017, the club was relegated from the Úrvalsdeild. and shortly after, KA decided to break off from the cooperation and fielded their own team starting from 2017 to 2018. Þór continued to run its men's team under the Akureyri name and in 2018, the team finished first in 1. deild karla and was promoted back to the Úrvalsdeild along with KA, which finished second.

On 28 December 2018, Akureyri fired Sverre from his position as head coach.

In 2019, Sverre was hired as an assistant coach to KA. On 6 April 2019 he appeared in KA's last game of the season at the age of 42, stating that it was the final game of his playing career.

== Titles, awards and achievements ==
=== Titles ===
- Icelandic championship (2): 1998, 2006
- Icelandic Cup (3): 1995, 1996, 2003
- 1. deild karla: 2018

=== Awards ===
- Knight's Cross of the Order of the Falcon: 2008
