= Alexander Tatarintsev =

Russian handball player (born 1990)

Personal information
- Nationality: Russian
- Born: 13 March 1990 (age 36) Stavropol, Russia
- Height: 2.08 m (6 ft 10 in)

Sport
- Sport: Handball
- Position: Left back
- Current club: Hörður
- Number: 18

Senior clubs
- Years: Team
- –2012: Viktor-SKA Stavropol
- 2012–2014: Ademar León
- 2014–2016: NMC Górnik Zabrze
- 2016–2017: IFK Kristianstad
- 2017–20??: NMC Górnik Zabrze
- 2023–present: Hörður
National team
Years	Team	Apps	(Gls)
2013–	Russia	10	(5)

Alexander Vladimirovich Tatarintsev (Russian: Александр Владимирович Татаринцев; born 13 March 1990) is a Russian handball player for Hörður and the Russian national team.

In January 2023, he signed with Hörður of the Icelandic Úrvalsdeild karla.
