= Martin Nagy =

Martin Nagy may refer to:

- Martin Nagy (footballer)
- Martin Nagy (handballer)
