= Icelandic Cup =

Icelandic Cup is a name given to cup competitions in Iceland and may refer to:

== Basketball ==
- Icelandic Men's Basketball Cup, the top tier men's basketball cup in Iceland
- Icelandic Women's Basketball Cup, the top tier women's basketball cup in Iceland

== Football ==
- Icelandic Men's Football Cup, the top tier men's football cup in Iceland
- Icelandic Women's Football Cup, the top tier women's football cup in Iceland

== Handball ==
- Icelandic Men's Handball Cup, the top tier men's handball cup in Iceland
- Icelandic Women's Handball Cup, the top tier women's handball cup in Iceland
