= Icelandic Sportsperson of the Year =

Annual awards ceremony

- Country: Iceland
- Presented by: Icelandic Association of Sports Journalists
- First award: 1956; 70 years ago

Highlights
- Most awards: Vilhjálmur Einarsson (5)
- Website: Official website

The Icelandic Sportsperson of the Year (Icelandic: Íþróttamaður ársins) is an annual award given to the best Icelandic sportsperson of the year. The winner is selected by the Icelandic Association of Sports Journalists. It was first given in 1956 to the triple jumper Vilhjálmur Einarsson, who is also the person with the most awards with five. Traditionally, the award is given at the Sportsperson of the Year Ball which is attended by journalists and sportspeople.

== Icelandic Sportsperson of the Year ==
Year	Winner	Sport	Reference
1956	Vilhjálmur Einarsson	Triple jump	
1957	Vilhjálmur Einarsson (2)	Triple jump	
1958	Vilhjálmur Einarsson (3)	Triple jump	
1959	Valbjörn Þorláksson	Decathlon	
1960	Vilhjálmur Einarsson (4)	Triple jump	
1961	Vilhjálmur Einarsson (5)	Triple jump	
1962	Guðmundur Gíslason	Swimming	
1963	Jón Þ. Ólafsson	High jump	
1964	Sigríður Sigurðardóttir	Handball	
1965	Valbjörn Þorláksson (2)	Decathlon	
1966	Kolbeinn Pálsson	Basketball	
1967	Guðmundur Hermannsson	Shot put	
1968	Geir Hallsteinsson	Handball	
1969	Guðmundur Gíslason (2)	Swimming	
1970	Erlendur Valdimarsson	Athletics	
1971	Hjalti Einarsson	Handball	
1972	Guðjón Guðmundsson	Swimming	
1973	Guðni Kjartansson	Football	
1974	Ásgeir Sigurvinsson	Football	
1975	Jóhannes Eðvaldsson	Football	
1976	Hreinn Halldórsson	Shot put	
1977	Hreinn Halldórsson (2)	Shot put	
1978	Skúli Óskarsson	Powerlifting	
1979	Hreinn Halldórsson (3)	Shot put	
1980	Skúli Óskarsson (2)	Powerlifting	
1981	Jón Páll Sigmarsson	Powerlifting	
1982	Óskar Jakobsson	Shot put	
1983	Einar Vilhjálmsson	Javelin throw	
1984	Ásgeir Sigurvinsson (2)	Football	
1985	Einar Vilhjálmsson (2)	Javelin throw	
1986	Eðvarð Þór Eðvarðsson	Swimming	
1987	Arnór Guðjohnsen	Football	
1988	Einar Vilhjálmsson (3)	Javelin throw	
1989	Alfreð Gíslason	Handball	
1990	Bjarni Friðriksson	Judo	
1991	Ragnheiður Runólfsdóttir	Swimming	
1992	Sigurður Einarsson	Javelin throw	
1993	Sigurbjörn Bárðarson	Equestrianism	
1994	Magnús Scheving	Aerobic gymnastics	
1995	Jón Arnar Magnússon	Decathlon	
1996	Jón Arnar Magnússon (2)	Decathlon	
1997	Geir Sveinsson	Handball	
1998	Örn Arnarson	Swimming	
1999	Örn Arnarson (2)	Swimming	
2000	Vala Flosadóttir	Pole vault	
2001	Örn Arnarson (3)	Swimming	
2002	Ólafur Stefánsson	Handball	
2003	Ólafur Stefánsson (2)	Handball	
2004	Eiður Smári Guðjohnsen	Football	
2005	Eiður Smári Guðjohnsen (2)	Football	
2006	Guðjón Valur Sigurðsson	Handball	
2007	Margrét Lára Viðarsdóttir	Football	
2008	Ólafur Stefánsson (3)	Handball	
2009	Ólafur Stefánsson (4)	Handball	
2010	Alexander Petersson	Handball	
2011	Heiðar Helguson	Football	
2012	Aron Pálmarsson	Handball	
2013	Gylfi Þór Sigurðsson	Football	
2014	Jón Arnór Stefánsson	Basketball	
2015	Eygló Ósk Gústafsdóttir	Swimming	
2016	Gylfi Þór Sigurðsson (2)	Football	
2017	Ólafía Þórunn Kristinsdóttir	Golf	
2018	Sara Björk Gunnarsdóttir	Football	
2019	Júlían J. K. Jóhannsson	Powerlifting	
2020	Sara Björk Gunnarsdóttir (2)	Football	
2021	Ómar Ingi Magnússon	Handball	
2022	Ómar Ingi Magnússon (2)	Handball	
2023	Gísli Þorgeir Kristjánsson	Handball	
2024	Glódís Perla Viggósdóttir	Football	
2025	Eygló Fanndal Sturludóttir	Weightlifting	
