= Martin Nagy (handballer) =

Hungarian handball player (born 1999)

Personal information
- Nationality: Hungarian
- Born: 9 January 1999 (age 27) Szeged, Hungary
- Height: 2.04 m (6 ft 8 in)

Sport
- Sport: Handball
- Position: Goalkeeper
- Current club: OV Helsingborg HK
- Number: 1

Youth career
- Years: Team
- 2013–2016: SC Pick Szeged

Senior clubs
- Years: Team
- 2017–2022: (Hungary) SC Pick Szeged
- 2020–2021: → (Iceland) Valur (loan)
- 2021–2022: → (Germany) VfL Gummersbach (loan)
- 2022–2023: (Germany) VfL Gummersbach
- 2023–2025: (Hungary) OTP Bank-Pick Szeged
- 2024: → (Denmark) Fredericia HK (loan)
- 2025–: (Sweden) OV Helsingborg HK
National team
Years	Team	Apps	(Gls)
2023–	Hungary	1	(0)

Martin Nagy (born 9 Januar 1999) is a Hungarian handball player for OV Helsingborg HK and the Hungary national handball team.

== Career ==
=== Club ===
Martin has been playing for SC Pick Szeged since 2013. In 2017, he played for the SC Pick Szeged senior team for the first time: on February 4, 2017, he made his debut in the SC Pick Szeged-Mezőkövesdi KC match. SC Pick Szeged won 39–19. Along with Mirko Alilovic and Roland Mikler, he got few opportunities to play, so in May 2020 it was announced that he would spend the 2020/21 season on loan at Iceland's Valur. He became champion and cup winner in Iceland and was voted the best goalkeeper of the playoffs. SC Pick Szeged also loaned him to the German second division VfL Gummersbach for the 2021/2022 season. He won the 2. Handball-Bundesliga here. When his contract expires, he will stay with the German club permanently. He broke his ankle before the start of Handball-Bundesliga although he recovered perfectly from his injury, he did not get a chance in the first division, he was only counted among the third division reserves, so VfL Gummersbach already decided in December not to use the extension option in his contract. In the summer of 2023, he returned to his parenting association, SC Pick Szeged. In December 2024, he was on loan in the Danish Fredericia HK team. In the summer of 2025, he signed for the Swedish top division team OV Helsingborg HK.

=== National team ===
As a member of the junior national team, he participated in the 2018 Junior European Championship where the Hungarian team became the 11th. As a member of the junior national team, he participated in the 2019 Junior World Championship where the Hungarian team became the 15th. He was included in the large squad of the 2023 World Men's Handball Championship, but in the end he will not become a member of the narrow squad. At the age of 20, on April 27, 2023, he made his debut in the senior national team in Klaipėda in the Lithuania-Hungary men's European qualifying match 31–46. He was included in the large squad of the 2024 European Men's Handball Championship, but in the end he will not become a member of the narrow squad.

== Honours ==
=== Club ===
Pick Szeged

- Nemzeti Bajnokság I
  - Gold: 2018
  - Silver: 2017, 2019, 2024, 2025
- Magyar Kupa
  - Gold: 2019, 2025
  - Silver: 2017, 2018, 2024

Valur

- Úrvalsdeild karla
  - Gold: 2021
- Icelandic Men's Handball Cup
  - Gold: 2021

VfL Gummersbach

- 2. Handball-Bundesliga
  - Gold: 2022
