= Valur (men's handball) =

Icelandic handball club

- Full name: Knattspyrnufélagið Valur
- Short name: Valur
- Founded: 1911; 115 years ago
- Arena: N1 höllin
- Head coach: Ágúst Þór Jóhannsson
- League: Úrvalsdeild karla
- Club colours
Home	Away

The Valur men's handball is an Iceland professional team handball club from Reykjavík, that plays in the Úrvalsdeild karla. It is part of the greater sports club Valur.

Location of Valur

== History ==
The Valur men's handball team has a long history in Icelandic handball, the club is one of the most successful in the sport in Iceland: no team has won the Icelandic Championship and the Icelandic Cup as many times as the Valur men's team. The team's greatest achievement was undoubtedly reaching the final of the EHF Champions League in 1980, which it lost against the German TV Grosswallstadt. The final was played in the Munich Olympic Hall and was lost 21:12. Since then, no Icelandic club team has reached the finals of a European competition.

In 2024 they won the EHF European Cup for the first time, beating Olympiacos S.F.P. in the final over two legs with 30-26 and 32-35 (62-61 agg.).

== Crest, colours, supporters ==
=== Kit manufacturers ===
Period	Kit manufacturer
2016	(Denmark) Hummel
2016–present	(Italy) Macron

=== Kits ===
HOME
2018–19	2019–20	2022–24

AWAY
2016–18	2019–20	2022–24

== Team ==
=== Current squad ===
Squad for the 2025–26 season

Valur

Goalkeepers

- 1 (Iceland) Björgvin Páll Gústavsson
- 20 (Iceland) Jens Sigurðarson
- 31 (Iceland) Arnar Thor Fylkisson
- 14 (Iceland) Anton Máni Francisco Heldersson

Left Wingers

- 21 (Iceland) Bessi Teitsson

Right Wingers

- 10 (Iceland) Daniel Montoro
- 25 (Faroe Islands) Allan Nordberg
- 15 (Iceland) Sigurðu Atli Ragnarsson

Line Players

- 3 (Iceland) Tjörvi Týr Gíslason
- 32 (Iceland) Jón Ásgeir Eyjólfsson
- 88 (Iceland) Andri Finnsson

Central Backs

- 2 (Iceland) Ágúst Ingi Óskarsson
- 18 (Iceland) Gunnar Róbertsson

Left Backs

- 4 (Faroe Islands) Bjarni Í Selvindi
- 19 (Iceland) Dagur Leó Fannarsson

Right Backs

- 6 (Iceland) Arnór Snær Óskarsson
- 14 (Iceland) Bjarki Snorrason

=== Coaching staff ===
- Head Coach: (Iceland) Ágúst Þór Jóhannsson
- Assistant Coach: (Iceland) Róbert Gunnarsson
- Goalkeeper Coach: (Iceland) Jóhann Ingi Guðmundsson
- Physiotherapist: (Iceland) Aron Óskar Þorleifsson
- General Manager: (Iceland) Atli Már Báruson

=== Transfers ===
Transfers for the 2026–27 season

Joining

- (Iceland) Tjörvi Týr Gíslason (LP) from (Germany) HC Oppenweiler/Backnang
- (Iceland) Ágúst Ingi Óskarsson (CB) from (Iceland) Free Agent
- (Iceland) Jón Ásgeir Eyjólfsson (P) from (Iceland) Stjarnan
- (Iceland) Bessi Teitsson (LW) from (Iceland) Grótta
- (Iceland) Stiven Valencia (LW) from (Portugal) S.L. Benfica

Leaving

- (Iceland) Thorvaldur Thorvaldsson (LP) to (Poland) Wybrzeże Gdańsk
- (Iceland) Dagur Árni Heimisson (CB) to (Iceland) KA
- (Iceland) Róbert Aron Hostert (LB) to (Iceland) Retirement
- (Iceland) Magnús Óli Magnússon (LB) to (Iceland) Retirement
- (Iceland) Agnar Smári Jónsson (RB) to (Iceland) Retirement

=== Transfer History ===
Transfers for the 2025–26 season

Joining

- (Iceland) Dagur Árni Heimisson (CB) from (Iceland) KA
- (Iceland) Arnór Snær Óskarsson (RB) from (Norway) Kolstad Håndball

Leaving

- (Iceland) Úlfar Páll Monsi Þórðarson (LW) to (North Macedonia) RK Alkaloid

Transfers for the 2024–25 season

Joining

- (Montenegro) Miodrag Ćorsović (LP) from (Slovenia) RK Trimo Trebnje

Leaving

- (Iceland) Benedikt Gunnar Óskarsson (CB) to (Norway) Kolstad Håndball
- (Iceland) Ísak Gústafsson (RB) to (Denmark) TMS Ringsted
- (Montenegro) Miodrag Ćorsović (LP) to (Serbia) RK Partizan

Transfers for the 2023–24 season

Joining

- (Faroe Islands) Allan Nordberg (RW) from (Iceland) KA
- (Iceland) (Latvia) Alexander Petersson (RB)
- (Iceland) Anton Rúnarsson (CB) from (Germany) TV Emsdetten
- (Iceland) Viktor Sigurðsson (CB) from (Iceland) ÍR Reykjavik
- (Iceland) Ísak Gústafsson (RB) from (Iceland) Selfoss

Leaving

- (Iceland) (Colombia) Stiven Tobar Valencia (LW) to (Portugal) S.L. Benfica
- (Iceland) Arnór Snær Óskarsson (RB) to (Germany) Rhein-Neckar Löwen
- (Iceland) Thorgils Svölu Baldursson (LP) to (Sweden) Karlskrona Handboll
- (Japan) Motoki Sakai (GK) to (Japan) Osaki Osol

== Previous Squads ==
2016–2017 Team
Shirt No	Nationality	Player	Birth Date	Position
1	Iceland	Daniel Andri Valtysson	27 August 1996 (age 30)	Goalkeeper
3	Iceland	Orri Freyr Gislason	29 May 1988 (age 38)	Line Player
4	Iceland	Olafur Aegir Olafsson	28 October 1995 (age 31)	Right Back
5	Iceland	Heidar Adalsteinsson	29 August 1988 (age 38)	Left Winger
6	Iceland	Atli Karl Bachmann	17 January 1991 (age 35)	Right Back
7	Iceland	Thorgils Jon Svölu Baldursson	31 May 1997 (age 29)	Line Player
8	Iceland	Atli Mar Baruson	17 June 1991 (age 35)	Central Back
9	Iceland	Alexander Masson	26 July 1998 (age 28)	Left Winger
10	Iceland	Vignir Stefansson	21 June 1990 (age 36)	Left Winger
11	Croatia	Josip Jurić-Grgić	4 April 1995 (age 31)	Left Back
12	Iceland	Sigurdur Ingiberg Olafsson	26 August 1992 (age 34)	Goalkeeper
14	Iceland	Bjarni Valdimarsson	29 November 1998 (age 27)	Left Back
15	Iceland	Alexander Örn Juliusson	17 October 1994 (age 32)	Left Back
16	Iceland	Hlynur Morthens	12 December 1975 (age 50)	Goalkeeper
18	Iceland	Sturla Magnusson	2 October 1996 (age 30)	Line Player
19	Iceland	Sveinn Aron Sveinsson	4 March 1993 (age 33)	Right Winger
21	Iceland	Helgi Karl Gudjonsson	6 February 1995 (age 31)	Left Winger
27	Iceland	Sveinn Jose Rivera	19 March 1998 (age 28)	Line Player
33	Iceland	Ýmir Örn Gíslason	1 July 1997 (age 29)	Line Player
34	Iceland	Anton Rúnarsson	20 July 1988 (age 38)	Central Back
44	Iceland	Sigurvin Jarl Armannsson	18 October 1996 (age 30)	Left Winger
58	Iceland	Markus Bjornsson	15 January 1998 (age 28)	Right Back

2007–2008 Team
Shirt No	Nationality	Player	Birth Date	Position
1	Iceland	Ingvar Gudmundsson	20 July 1988 (age 38)	Goalkeeper
3	Iceland	Orri Freyr Gislason	29 May 1988 (age 38)	Line Player
4	Iceland	Kristjan Karlsson	2 May 1984 (age 42)	Right Winger
5	Iceland	David Höskuldsson	30 January 1981 (age 45)	Left Winger
6	Iceland	Hjalti Palmason	6 May 1981 (age 45)	Left Back
7	Iceland	Baldvin Porsteinsson	22 November 1983 (age 42)	Left Winger
8	Iceland	Markus Mani Michaelsson-Maute	17 June 1981 (age 45)	Left Back
9	Iceland	Anton Rúnarsson	20 July 1988 (age 38)	Central Back
10	Iceland	Gunnar Hardarson	14 January 1986 (age 40)	Line Player
11	Iceland	Ingvar Arnason	15 July 1986 (age 40)	Line Player
12	Iceland	Olafur Haukur Gislason	8 March 1981 (age 45)	Goalkeeper
13	Iceland	Agir Jonsson	12 May 1979 (age 47)	Line Player
14	Iceland	Sigfus Pall Sigfusson	1 February 1986 (age 40)	Central Back
15	Iceland	Elvar Fridriksson	12 June 1986 (age 40)	Left Back
16	Iceland	Palmar Petursson	22 November 1984 (age 41)	Goalkeeper
17	Iceland	Arnór Þór Gunnarsson	23 October 1987 (age 39)	Right Winger
18	Iceland	Ernir Hrafn Arnarson	13 November 1986 (age 40)	Right Back
20	Iceland	Birkir Marinosson	16 September 1988 (age 38)	Right Winger
23	Iceland	Fannar Fridgeirsson	3 June 1987 (age 39)	Central Back
66	Iceland	Atli Steinthorsson	2 December 1980 (age 45)	Line Player

== Accomplishments ==
=== Domestic ===
- Úrvalsdeild karla
  - Winner (25) : 1940, 1941, 1942, 1944, 1947, 1948, 1951, 1955, 1973, 1977, 1978, 1979, 1988, 1989, 1991, 1993, 1994, 1995, 1996, 1998, 2007, 2017, 2021, 2022, 2026
- Icelandic Men's Handball Cup
  - Winner (13) : 1974, 1988, 1990, 1993, 1998, 2008, 2009, 2011, 2016, 2017, 2021, 2022, 2024

=== International ===
- EHF Champions League:
  - Runners-up : 1979–80
- EHF European Cup:
  - Champions : 2023–24

== European record ==
=== European Cup and Champions League ===
Season	Round	Club	Home	Away	Aggregate
1979–80; Finalist	Round 2	(England) Brentwood'72 HC	38–14	32–19	70–33
1979–80; Finalist	Quarter-finals	(Sweden) HK Drott	18–16	17–18	35–34
1979–80; Finalist	Semi-finals	(Spain) Atlético Madrid BM	18–15	21–24	39–39 (a)
1979–80; Finalist	Finals	(Germany) TV Grosswallstadt	12–21		

=== EHF European Cup ===
Season	Round	Club	Home	Away	Aggregate
2023–24; Winners	Round 1	(Lithuania) Granitas-Karys	27–24	33–28	60–52
2023–24; Winners	Round 2	(Estonia) Põlva Serviti	39–28	32–29	71–57
2023–24; Winners	Round 3	(Ukraine) Motor	33–28	35–31	68–59
2023–24; Winners	Last 16	(Serbia) RK Metaloplastika	27–26	30–28	57–54
2023–24; Winners	Quarterfinals	(Romania) CSA Steaua București	36–30	36–35	72–65
2023–24; Winners	Semifinals	(Romania) CS Minaur Baia Mare	36–28	30–24	66–52
2023–24; Winners	Finals	(Greece) Olympiacos S.F.P.	30–26	27–31	57–57 (5–4 p)

=== EHF ranking ===
As of 17/07/2026

Rank	Team	Points
31	(North Macedonia) RK Alkaloid	89
32	(North Macedonia) RK Vardar 1961	87
33	(Slovenia) RK Celje	86
34	(Iceland) Valur	86
35	(Switzerland) Kadetten Schaffhausen	85
36	(North Macedonia) GRK Ohrid	84
37	(Romania) CS Minaur Baia Mare	84

== Former club members ==
=== Notable former players ===
- (Iceland) Ernir Hrafn Arnarson (2006-2011)
- (Iceland) Fannar Fridgeirsson (2004-2010)
- (Iceland) Ýmir Örn Gíslason (2016-2020)
- (Iceland) Snorri Guðjónsson (2000-2003, 2017-2018)
- (Iceland) Hreiðar Guðmundsson (2019-2020)
- (Iceland) Valdimar Grímsson (1984-1994, 2000-2001)
- (Iceland) Arnór Þór Gunnarsson (2006-2010)
- (Iceland) Björgvin Páll Gústavsson (2021–)
- (Iceland) Guðmundur Hólmar Helgason (2013-2016)
- (Iceland) Guðmundur Hrafnkelsson (1991-1999)
- (Iceland) Daníel Þór Ingason (2013–2016)
- (Iceland) Einar Örn Jónsson (1995-2000)
- (Iceland) Ólafur Jónsson (1965-1975, 1984-1985)
- (Iceland) Kári Kristján Kristjánsson (2014-2015)
- (Iceland) Ómar Ingi Magnússon (2014–2016)
- (Iceland) Markus Mani Michaelsson-Maute (-2004, 2006-2011)
- (Iceland) Arnór Snær Óskarsson (2017-2023)
- (Iceland) (Latvia) Alexander Petersson (2023–2025)
- (Iceland) Anton Rúnarsson (2007-2012, 2016-2021, 2023-)
- (Iceland) Árni Þór Sigtryggsson (2017–2018)
- (Iceland) Dagur Sigurðsson (1990-1996)
- (Iceland) Ólafur Stefánsson (1984–1996)
- (Iceland) Geir Sveinsson (1980-1989, 1999–2003)
- (Iceland) (Colombia) Stiven Tobar Valencia (2017-2023)
- (Croatia) Josip Jurić-Grgić (2016-2017)
- (Hungary) Martin Nagy (2020-2021)
- (Japan) Motoki Sakai (2021-2023)

=== Former coaches ===
Seasons	Coach	Country
2017-2023	Snorri Guðjónsson	(Iceland)
2023–2025	Óskar Bjarni Óskarsson	(Iceland)
2025-	Ágúst Þór Jóhannsson	(Iceland)
