= Aron Pálmarsson =

Icelandic handball player (born 1990)

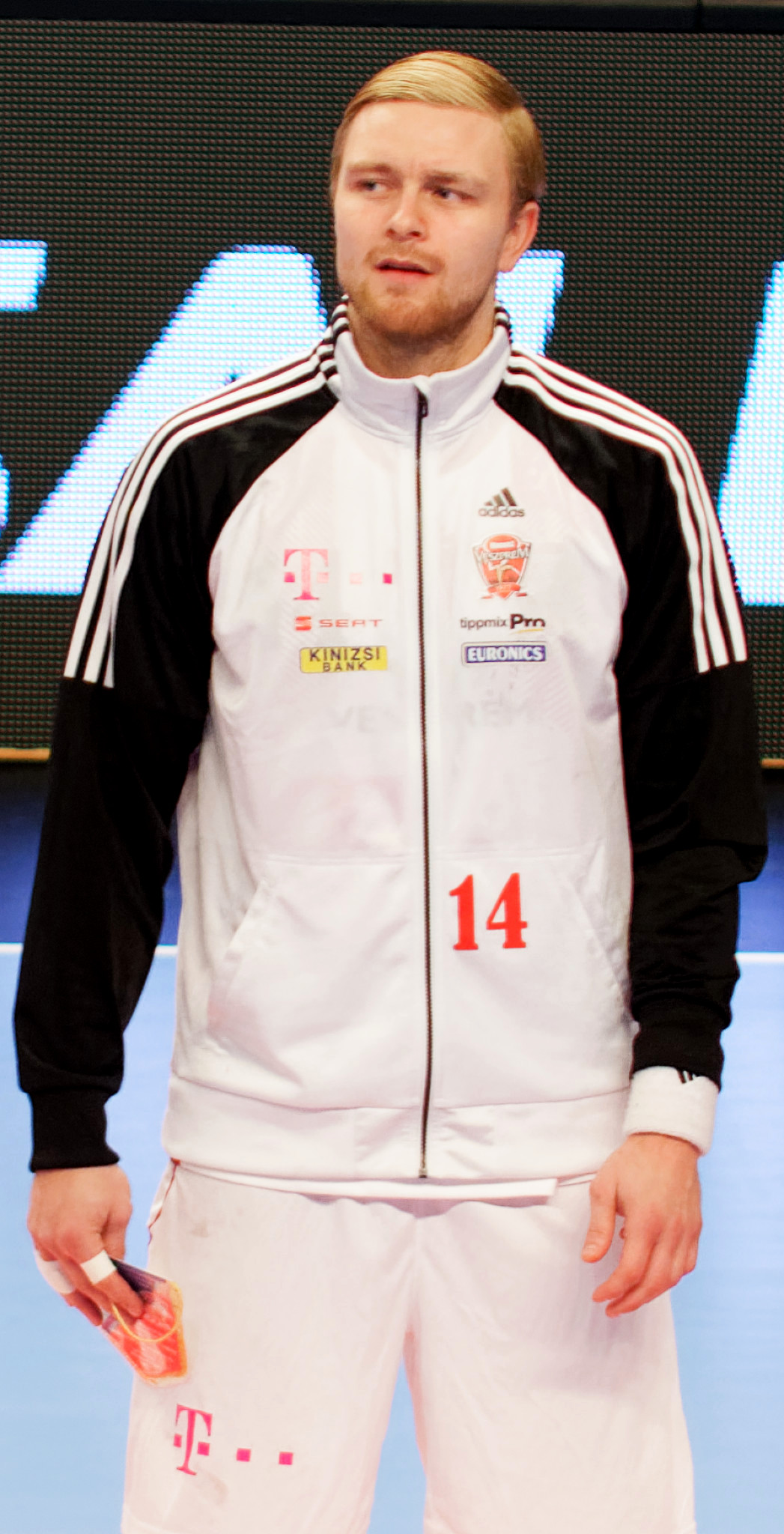
- Aron with Telekom Veszprém in 2016

Personal information
- Nationality: Icelandic
- Born: 19 July 1990 (age 36) Reykjavík, Iceland
- Height: 1.93 m (6 ft 4 in)

Sport
- Sport: Handball
- Position: Left back

Youth career
- Years: Team
- –2005: FH

Senior clubs
- Years: Team
- 2005–2009: FH
- 2009–2015: THW Kiel
- 2015–2017: Telekom Veszprém
- 2017–2021: FC Barcelona
- 2021–2023: Aalborg Håndbold
- 2023–2024: FH
- 2024–2025: ONE Veszprém
National team
| Years | Team | Apps | (Gls) |
| 2008–2025 | Iceland | 148 | (576) |
Medal record
European Championship
| Bronze medal – third place | 2010 Austria |

Aron Pálmarsson (born 19 July 1990) is an Icelandic former handball player.

== Career ==
Aron played his first game for FH only aged 15 years old against ÍBV in March 2006. FH won the game 30–28 and the young player managed to score one goal.

In the season 2007–08 Aron was one of the key players when FH won the 1.deild and won promotion to úrvalsdeild. Aron scored 130 goals in 22 games.

The 2008–09 season was very successful for Aron. Aron scored 115 goals in 16 games. FH finished 5th in the league. He was voted the most promising player, the best offensive player and was selected in the team of the season. He was also selected in the Iceland national team.

After Aron was brought to Kiel, FH awarded him with their Golden award for his successful career with the club.

He gained attention while playing for FH before he transferred to German club THW Kiel.

On 29 December 2012 Aron won the award "Best athlete of the year 2012" in Iceland.

He played a major part in the Iceland squad that earned the bronze medal at the 2010 European championship in Austria.

== Personal life ==
Aron's father is former basketball player Pálmar Sigurðsson who was named to the Icelandic basketball team of the 20th century by the Icelandic Basketball Association in 2001.

== Honours ==
=== THW Kiel ===
- Bundesliga: 2010, 2012, 2013, 2014, 2015
- German Cup: 2011, 2012
- DHB-Supercup: 2011
- Champions League: 2010, 2012

=== MVM Veszprém KC ===
- Nemzeti Bajnokság I: 2016, 2017
- Magyar Kupa: 2016, 2017
- SEHA League: 2016

=== FC Barcelona ===
- Copa ASOBAL: 2018, 2019, 2020, 2021
- Supercopa ASOBAL: 2018, 2019, 2020, 2021
- Liga ASOBAL: 2018, 2019, 2020, 2021
- Copa del Rey de Balonmano: 2018, 2019, 2020, 2021
- IHF Super Globe: 2018, 2019
- EHF Champions League: 2021

=== Aalborg Håndbold ===
- Danish Men's Handball Cup: 2021
- Danish Super Cup: 2021, 2022

=== FH Hafnarfjörður ===
- Úrvalsdeild: 2024

=== International ===
- 3rd place at 2010 European Championship

==== Individual ====
- Selected Rookie of the year in Bundesliga 2010
- Selected in 2012 Olympic Games All Star Team
- Selected Sportsperson of the Year in Iceland 2012
- MVP of the Champions League Final-Four: 2014, 2016
- Awarded FH Gold Badge
