= Akureyri Handboltafélag =

Icelandic handball club

- Full name: Akureyri Handboltafélag
- Short name: Akureyri
- Founded: 2006
- Dissolved: 2019
- Arena: Íþróttahöllin á Akureyri
- Capacity: 1110
- Club colours
Home	Away

Akureyri Handboltafélag was a men's handball club, located in Akureyri, Iceland.

== History ==
Akureyri Handboltafélag was founded in 2006 as a joint team between KA and Þór Akureyri. In 2011 it posted the best record in the Úrvalsdeild karla and finished as the runner-up to the Icelandic Cup. It made it to the 2011 Úrvalsdeild finals where it lost to FH in front of a record crowd of 2950 people in Kaplakriki.

In 2017, the club was relegated from the Úrvalsdeild. and shortly after, KA decided to break off from the cooperation and fielded their own team starting from 2017–2018. Þór continued to run its men's team under the Akureyri name and in 2018, the team finished first in 1. deild karla and was promoted back to the Úrvalsdeild along with KA, which finished second.

On 28 December 2018, the club fired head coach Sverre Jakobsson. and hired former national coach, Geir Sveinsson. After losing their final game of the season, Akureyri was relegated back to 1. deild karla.

On 17 April 2019, it was announced that Akureyri Handboltafélag would be dissolved and Þór Akureyri would take over all their operations for the 2019–2020 season.

== Trophies ==
1. deild karla:

- 2018

League Champions (Icelandic: Deildarmeistarar)^{1}:

- 2011

^{1} Awarded for best regular season record
