= Einar Örn Jónsson =

Icelandic handball player (born 1976)

Personal information
- Born: 28 December 1976 (age 49) Reykjavik, Iceland
- Height: 183 cm (72 in)

Sport
- Sport: Handball
- Position: Right wing
- Current club: Retired

Youth career
- Years: Team
- –1995: Valur

Senior clubs
- Years: Team
- 1995–2000: Valur
- 2000–2002: Haukar Handball
- 2002–2005: SG Wallau-Massenheim
- 2005–2006: CB Torrevieja
- 2006–2008: GWD Minden
- 2008–2010: Haukar Handball
National team
Years	Team	Apps	(Gls)
2001–2010	Iceland	122	(253)

Einar Örn Jónsson (born 28 December 1976) is a former Icelandic handball player and current sports reporter at the Icelandic National Broadcasting Service. He competed in the 2004 Summer Olympics.
