= Samtök íþróttafréttamanna =

- Association of Sports Journalists
- Abbreviation: SÍ
- Formation: February 14, 1956; 70 years ago
- Location: Iceland
- Official language: Icelandic
- Affiliations: The Union of Icelandic Journalists
- Website: sportpress.is

Samtök íþróttafréttamanna (SÍ) (English: Association of Sports Journalists) is an association for Icelandic sports journalists. It was founded on 14 February 1956. SÍ oversees the nomination of the Icelandic Sportsperson of the Year and has done so since its establishment.

== Chairmen ==
- Atli Steinarsson 1956–1965
- Sigurður Sigurðsson 1965–1971
- Jón Ásgeirsson 1971–1977
- Steinar J. Lúðvíksson 1977–1978
- Bjarni Felixson 1978–1980
- Ingólfur Hannesson 1980–1981
- Þórarinn Ragnarsson 1981–1983
- Hermann Gunnarsson 1983–1984
- Samúel Örn Erlingsson 1984–1987
- Skúli Unnar Sveinsson 1987–1988
- Samúel Örn Erlingsson 1988–1992
- Skapti Hallgrímsson 1992–1998
- Ívar Benediktsson 1998–1999
- Adolf Ingi Erlingsson 1999–2006
- Þorsteinn Gunnarsson 2006–2009
- Sigurður Elvar Þórólfsson 2009–2013
- Eiríkur Stefán Ásgeirsson 2013–2019
- Tómas Þór Þórðarson 2019–
