= 1. deild karla (handball) =

Icelandic men's handball league

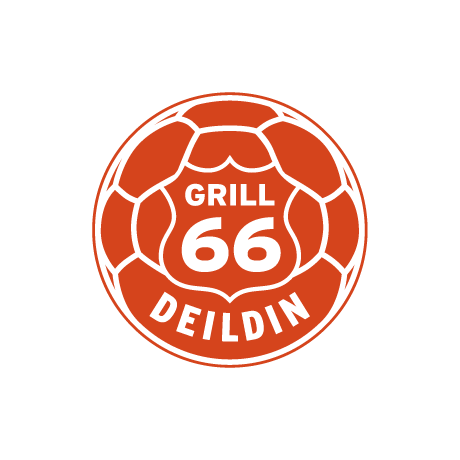
- Founded: 1952
- No. of teams: 10
- Country: Iceland
- Confederation: European Handball Federation
- Most recent champion: Fjölnir (2nd)
- Most titles: ÍR, Afturelding (6 titles)
- Level on pyramid: 2
- Promotion to: Úrvalsdeild karla
- Website: hsi.is
- 2019-2020

1. deild karla (English: Men's 1st Division), also known as Grill 66 deild karla for sponsorship reasons, is the second-tier men's handball competition among clubs in Iceland. It is managed by the Icelandic Handball Association. The current champions are Fjölnir.

== Past champions ==
	Club	Titles
1.	Afturelding	6
	ÍR	6
3.	Víkingur	5
4.	Grótta	4
	KR	4
6.	Ármann	3
	Fram	3
	HK	3
	Selfoss	3
	Þróttur	3
12.	Fylkir	2
	Haukar	2
	ÍBV	2
	KA	2
	Stjarnan	2
	Fjölnir	2
17.	Akureyri Handboltafélag	1
	Breiðablik	1
	FH	1
	Grótta/KR	1
	Valur	1
	Þór Akureyri	1
	Þór Vestmannaeyjum	1

== Awards ==
=== Player of the Year ===
- 2017 - Jón Kristinn Björgvinsson
- 2018 - Kristófer Dagur Sigurðsson

=== Young player of the Year ===
- 2017 - Sveinn Jóhannsson
- 2018 - Dagur Gautason

=== Coach of the Year ===
- 2017 - Arnar Gunnarsson
- 2018 - Sverre Andreas Jakobsson
