= Per Skaarup =

Danish handball player (born 1955)

Per Skaarup (born July 6, 1955) is a Danish former handball player who competed in the 1980 Summer Olympics and in the 1984 Summer Olympics. In total he played 127 matches for the Danish national team, scoring 155 goals.

He was born in Frederiksberg.

At club level he played for HG and Gladsaxe in Denmark and Fram Reykjavik in Iceland. He debuted for the Danish national team in May 1978 in a match against West Germany.

In 1980 he was part of the Danish team which finished ninth in the Olympic tournament. He played all six matches and scored four goals.

Four years later he finished fourth with the Danish team in the 1984 Olympic tournament. He played all six matches and scored seven goals.
