= OV Helsingborg HK =

Swedish handball club

- Full name: Olympia Vikingarna Helsingborgs Handbollsklubb
- Founded: 1994
- Arena: Helsingborg Arena, Helsingborg
- Capacity: 5,000
- League: Handbollsligan
- 2024–25: 6th
- Club colours
Home	Away

OV Helsingborg HK, is a handball team from Helsingborg, Sweden, which currently plays in Handbollsligan, the top level of Swedish men's handball. The club was founded in 1994 as a merger of Vikingarnas IF (founded in 1941) and HF Olympia (founded in 1963). Vikingarna have been Swedish champions three times (1961, 1967 and 1981). They last played in the top level in 1990. Olympia were less successful, but played two seasons in the top division from 1977 to 1979. OV Helsingborg reached the top division in 2007, 2009 and 2017 but were immediately relegated all three times. In 2019 and 2020 they played in the top division again for two seasons before they were relegated. They once again played the top division 2022/2023, but were relegated.

Location of OV Helsingborg HK

== Kits ==
HOME
2019-20	2020-

AWAY
2015-16	2017-18	2019-20	2020-

== Sports Hall information ==
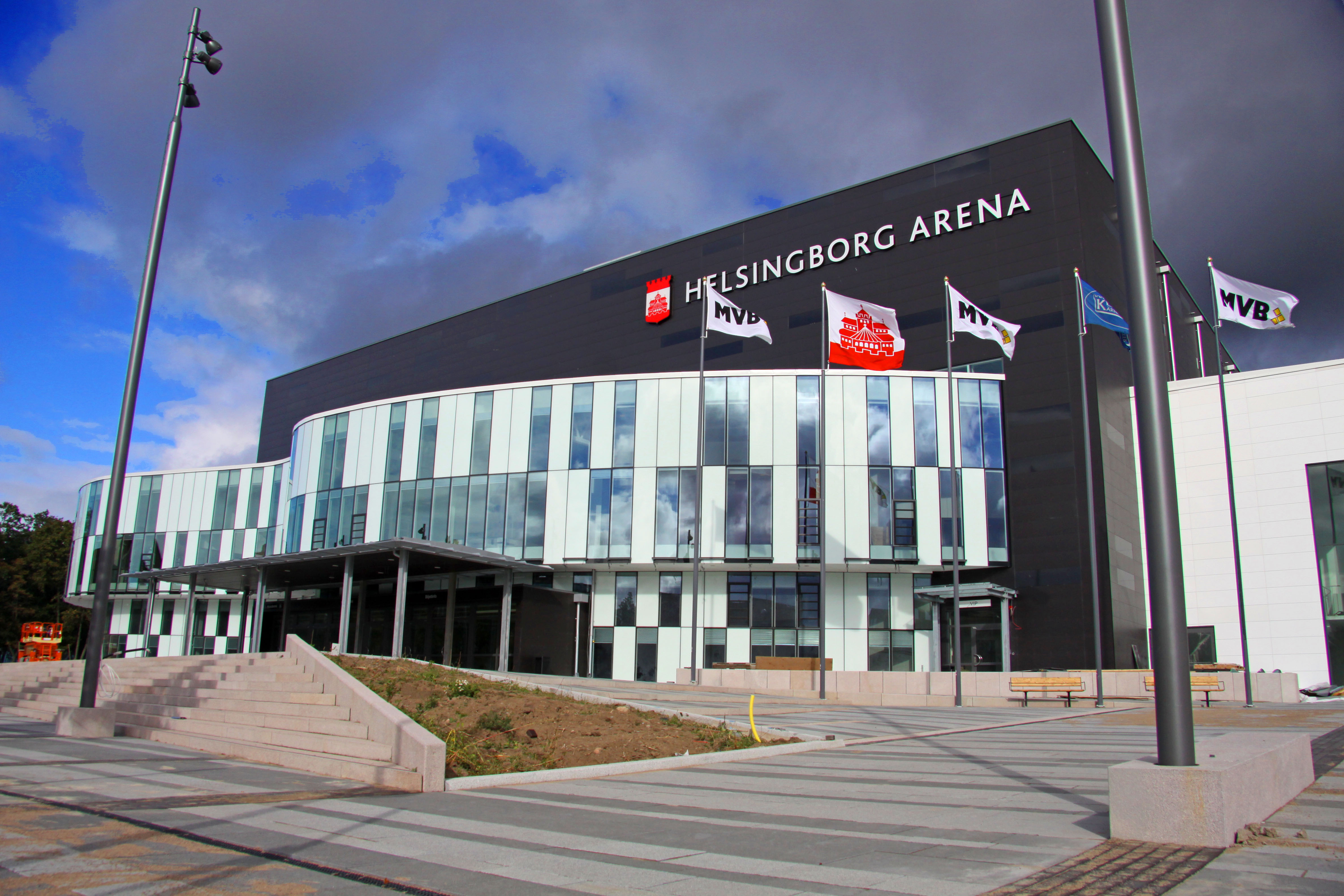
Home hall: Helsingborg Arena

- Name: – Helsingborg Arena
- City: – Helsingborg
- Capacity: – 5000
- Address: – Mellersta Stenbocksgatan 14, 254 37 Helsingborg, Sweden

== Team ==
=== Current squad ===
Squad for the 2026–27 season

Goalkeepers

- (Denmark) Patrick Bols
- (Hungary) Martin Nagy

Left Wingers
Right Wingers

- (Sweden) Alvin Lindvall

Line players

- (Sweden) Nils Mellert
- (Sweden) William Bengtsson

Left Backs

- (Norway) André Pung Tuzov
- (Sweden) Jesper Lindgren

Central Backs

- (Sweden) Anders Forsell Schefvert

Right Backs

- (Denmark) Anders Christian Thomassen

=== Transfers ===
Transfers for the 2026–27 season

Joining

- (Norway) André Pung Tuzov (LB) from (Romania) CSM București
- (Denmark) Patrick Bols (GK) from (Sweden) Önnereds HK
- (Sweden) Nils Mellert (LP) from (Sweden) HK Aranäs
- (Sweden) Alvin Lindvall (RW) from (Sweden) HK Aranäs

Leaving

- (Sweden) Marcus Norrbrink (LB) to (Germany) SG BBM Bietigheim
- (Sweden) Alfred Arnelin (RW) to (Denmark) Skjern Håndbold
- (Sweden) Marcus Björkman (LP) to (Denmark) Nordsjælland Håndbold

=== Transfer History ===
Transfers for the 2025–26 season

Joining

- (Hungary) Martin Nagy (GK) from (Hungary) OTP Bank-Pick Szeged
- (Denmark) Anders Christian Thomassen (RB) from (Denmark) Skanderborg AGF Håndbold
- (Sweden) Jesper Lindgren (LB) from (Denmark) Ribe-Esbjerg HH
- (Sweden) Anders Forsell Schefvert (CB) from (Sweden) Amo Handboll
- (Sweden) William Bengtsson (LP) from (Sweden) Önnereds HK

Leaving

- (Denmark) Daniel Astrup Pedersen (LP) to (Germany) GWD Minden
