= Valdimar Grímsson =

Icelandic handball player (born 1965)

Personal information
- Nationality: Icelandic
- Born: 5 December 1965 (age 60) Reykjavík, Iceland
- Height: 1.80 m (5 ft 11 in)

Sport
- Sport: Handball
- Position: Right wing

Senior clubs
- Years: Team
- 1984–1993: Valur
- 1993–1995: KA
- 1995–1998: Selfoss
- 1998–2000: KA
- 2000–2001: HC Wuppertal
- 2001–2002: Valur
- –: HK
National team
Years	Team	Apps	(Gls)
1985-2000	Iceland	271	(940)

Valdimar Grímsson (born 5 December 1965) is an Icelandic former handball player who competed in the 1992 Summer Olympics.
