= Skúli Óskarsson =

Icelandic powerlifter (1948–2024)

Skúli Margeir Óskarsson (3 September 1948 – 9 June 2024) was an Icelandic powerlifter and weightlifter, who became the first Icelander to deadlift 300 kg and 700 lb. He was a pioneer of strength athletics in Iceland and was the first Icelander to break a world record in any strength sport.

Skúli grew up in Fáskrúðsfjörður as a fisherman and started Olympic weightlifting as a hobby in the late 1960s. Then he switched to powerlifting. He competed in his first tournament in 1970. Within a few years he broke multiple Icelandic records and won Silver in lightweight (under 75 kg) category at the 1978 IPF World Championships in Turku, Finland by totaling 722.5 kg (1,593 lb) in single ply equipment. For that performance, he was elected the Icelandic Sportsperson of the Year in 1978. He also won Bronze in the same weight class in 1975 and 1981 World Championships held in Birmingham and Calcutta respectively. Skuli was famous for his lively celebrations during powerlifting tournaments. In 1980, he broke the Raw Deadlift world record in the under 75 kg weight class with 315.5 kg (696 lb) and for the 2nd time got elected as the Icelandic Sportsperson of the Year in 1980.

In his career, Skúli won a silver medal and two bronze medals in World championships, three gold medals in Nordic championships and multiple gold medals in National championships. In 2016 he was awarded the KRAFT gold medal by Icelandic Powerlifting Federation and on 28 December 2017 was inducted into the ÍSÍ Hall of Fame.

Skúli died on 9 June 2024 from heart failure at the Landspitali University Hospital, aged 75.

== Personal Records ==
Single-ply

- Squat – 320 kg (705 lb) with wraps (1981 EPF Men's European Powerlifting Championships, Italy)
- Bench press – 145 kg (320 lb) (1982 KRAFT Sjónvarpsmót í kraftlyftingum, Iceland)
- Deadlift – 320 kg (705 lb) (1982 KRAFT Íslandsmeistaramót í kraftlyftingum, Iceland)
- Total – 777.5 kg (1,714 lb) (320 + 145 + 312.5 kg (705 + 320 + 689 lb)) (1982 KRAFT Sjónvarpsmót í kraftlyftingum, Iceland)

Raw

- Squat – 242.5 kg (535 lb) with wraps (1976 NPF Men's Nordic Championships, Norway)
- Bench press – 132.5 kg (292 lb) (1975 KRAFT Íslandsmeistaramót í kraftlyftingum, Iceland)
- Deadlift – 315.5 kg (696 lb) (1980 KRAFT Laugardalshöll Championships, Iceland) (Former World Record)
- Total – 650 kg (1,433 lb) (242.5 + 120 + 287.5 kg (535 + 265 + 634 lb)) (1976 NPF Men's Nordic Championships, Norway)
