= Grótta =

Island in Iceland

Coordinates: 64.1644°N 22.0220°W

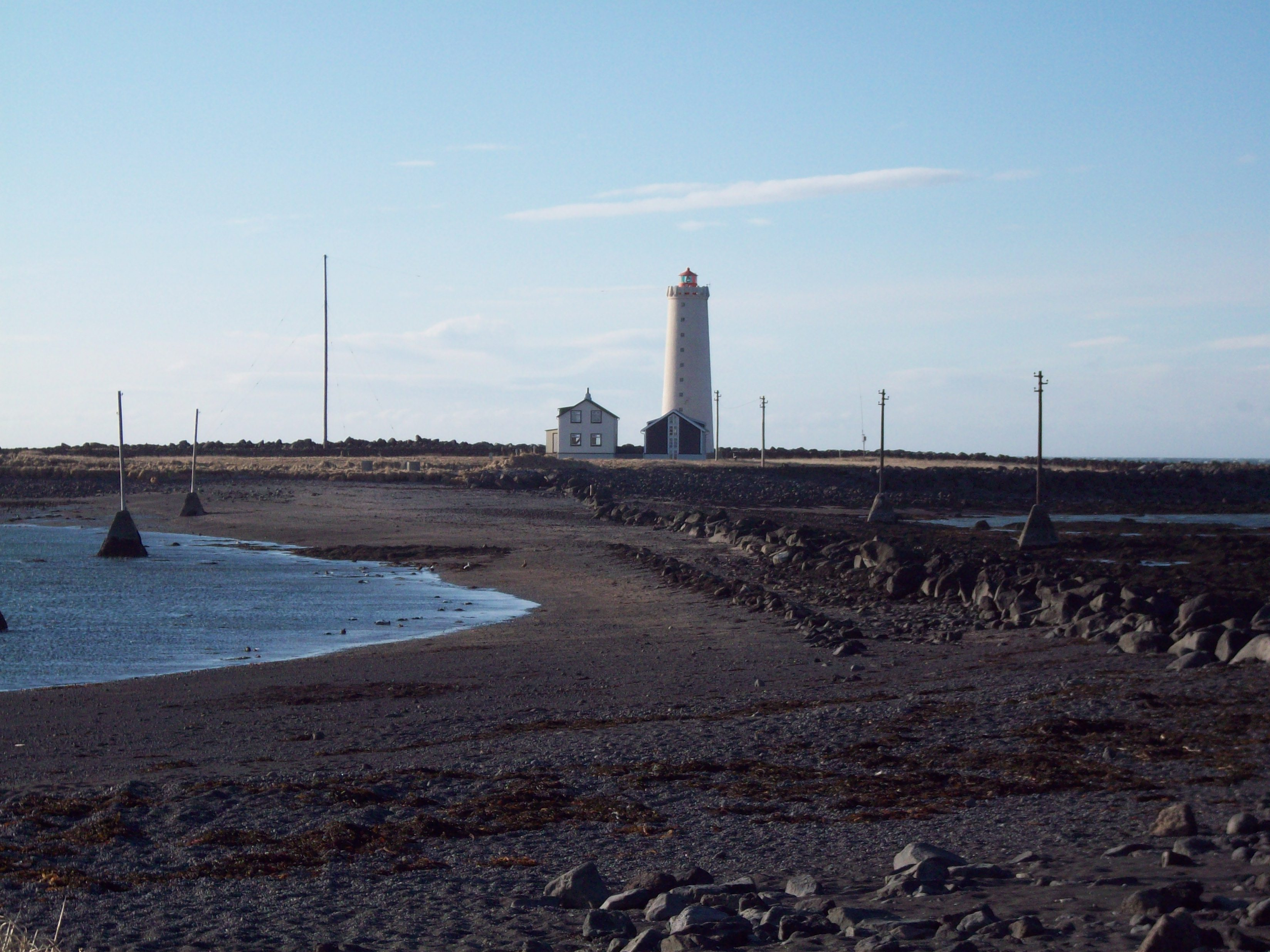
The lighthouse of Grótta.

Grótta (pronounced [ˈkrouhta]) is a tied island at the extreme end of Seltjarnarnes in the Capital Region of Iceland. During high tide the tombolo is completely submerged, turning Grótta into an island.

The island is accessible by foot during low tide, giving people a window of about six hours to visit the island. Grótta and the region close by is a popular outdoor recreational area.

Grótta became a nature reserve in 1974 and it is forbidden to visit it during nesting season, from 1 May to 15 July. There are about 450 couples of arctic terns in Grótta.

A lighthouse was originally built in 1897, a new one was built in 1947. The local search and rescue association is named after long term lighthouse keeper Albert Þorvarðarson (1910–1973).

The main house has been deserted since 1970. The municipality acquired the buildings in 1994 and they are now used as occasional facilities for groups on school trips.
