= Conservation in Iceland =

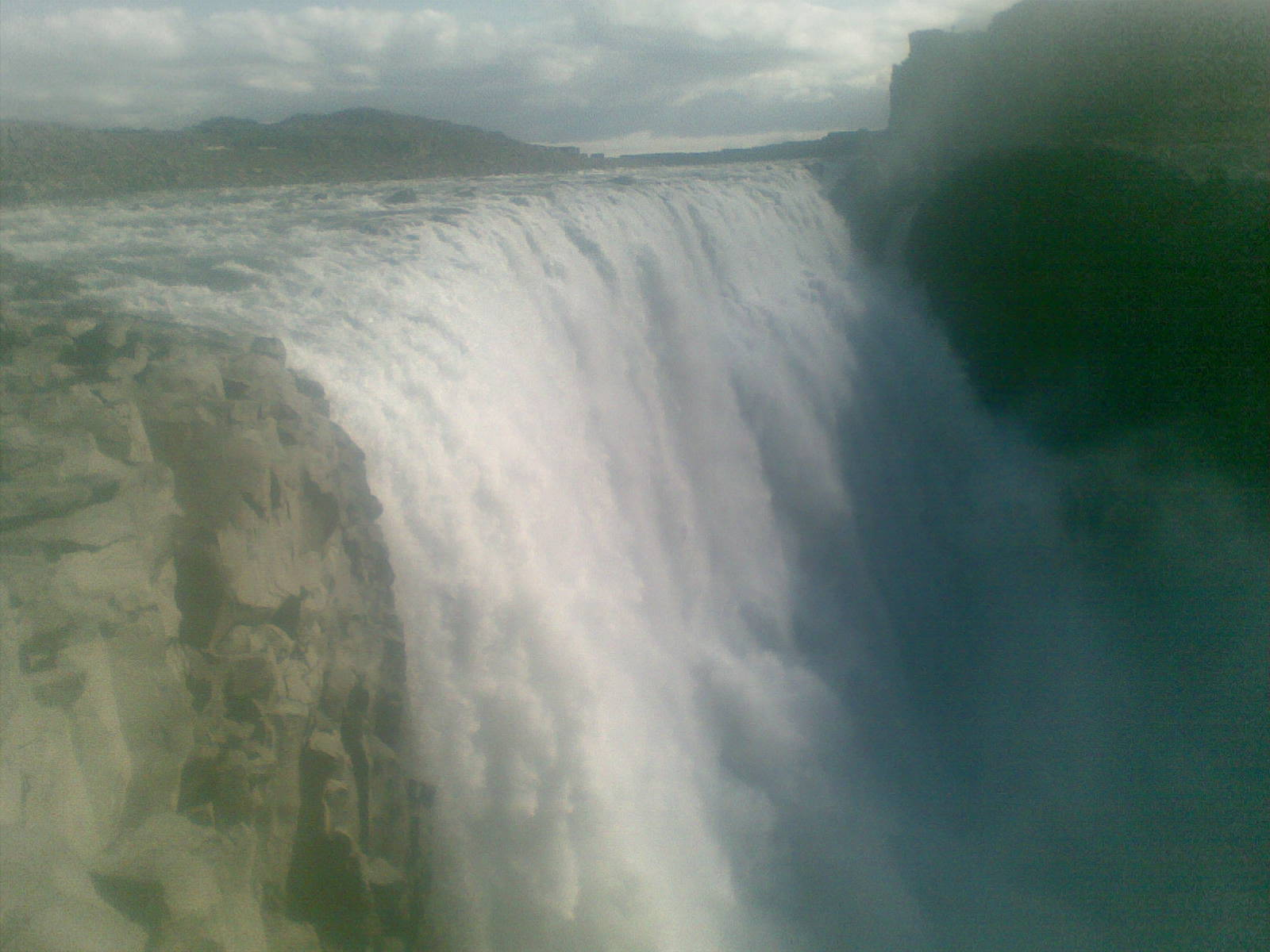
Dettifoss is a waterfall in the glacial river Jökulsá á Fjöllum. It is in the conservation group 'Náttúruvætti'.

Conservation in Iceland is regulated under a programme known in Icelandic as Náttúruverndarlög (conservation of nature) initiated in 1971. It offers a basis for ensuring the long-term protection of places or areas. The Umhverfisstofnun (environmental authority) decides which areas are to be addressed.

There are six main types of conservation in Iceland:

- Fólkvangar (country parks)
- Friðlönd (nature reserves)
- Náttúruvætti (natural monuments)
- Tegundir og búsvæði (species and habitats)
- Þjóðgarðar (natural parks)
- Önnur svæði (other)

== Environmental Degradation ==
Iceland was settled by humans around 1,100 years ago when the Vikings arrived and at the time two thirds of the island were vegetated and one fourth was woodland. But, after hundreds of years of livestock grazing and clear cutting practices, Iceland’s ecosystems and soils have become severely degraded with 30% of the land facing desertification and 50% with severe erosion. Additionally, only 1% of the land now is woodland which means a loss of 95% of it's original tree coverage. Road construction, gravel mining, geothermal power plant construction, and changes in climate are all additional factors to the ecological destruction in Iceland. Soil degradation and vegetation loss contribute to the release of carbon emissions, so efforts to reverse these processes could help Iceland achieve zero-emission status.

== Iceland Soil Conservation Service ==
The Soil Conservation Service was established in 1907 to reverse the environmental damage that was affecting the lifestyles of farmers, fisherman, and others. It was originally called the Sand Reclamation Institute and was primarily focused on combatting desertification and sand encroachment, but it has since expanded its practices to include land reclamation, public education, and more. Original projects by the SCS were localized to specific sites and only addressed symptoms of degradation rather than the actual causes. Also, the institution often failed to include land-users in the process or hold them accountable for their actions, so most projects were fully taken on by SCS staff, leading to an idea that the government was solely responsible for soil degradation. However, the SCS has more recently become an essential actor in environmental protection and community involvement in Iceland.

== Conservation Initiatives ==
A greater movement for conservation began in the 1960’s-70’s as citizens became more informed about the poor treatment of land, and the NGO Landvernd was established to support the effort. A new resolution was created in 1974 to provide more funds to revegetation and land research, and at the same time energy companies were becoming more prevalent in restoration projects by working to revegetate areas alongside any new construction. Later, in 1991, a mapping project using GIS was introduced by the SCS and Agricultural Research Institute to determine the scale of soil erosion and the severity in different areas.

Another important policy was implemented in 2004; a subsidy contract between sheep farmers and the Icelandic government included a requirement to maintain "quality management" of land in order to gain up to 22.5% more government support. If the farmers didn’t meet the requirements for the subsidy they could join the Better Farms program which allowed them to lead in the planning process by providing them with aerial land photographs, seminars, and any additional support they may need.

=== Reforestation ===
Iceland has lost around 95% of its forest cover due to human settlement and the collection of firewood, which has now mostly ended due to the increase in use of other energy sources. The Icelandic Forest Service is the most influential organization for reforestation with the use of passive methods to protect trees from livestock grazing. However, more recently, woodland restoration can also be attributed to the Icelandic Forestry Association which recruits volunteers to evaluate sites and plant saplings. They plant multiple tree species, but the best tree is often birch due to its tolerance of poor soil, and because it provides cover for other species. Restoring tree coverage is a very slow process and even planting three million trees in Iceland has only led to a small increase to the 1% that existed in the early 1900’s.

== See also ==
- Conservation biology
- Dettifoss
- Heidmork
