= Geir Sveinsson =

Icelandic handball player (born 1964)

Personal information
- Nationality: Icelandic
- Born: 27 January 1964 (age 62)
- Height: 1.94 m (6 ft 4 in)

Sport
- Sport: Handball
- Position: Pivot

Senior clubs
- Years: Team
- 1980–1989: Valur
- 1989–1991: BM Granollers
- 1991–1995: CBM Alzira Avidesa
- 1995–1997: Montpellier Handball
- 1997–1999: HC Wuppertal
National team
Years	Team	Apps	(Gls)
1984–1999	Iceland	340	(502)

Teams managed
- 1999–2003: Valur
- 2010–2011: Grótta
- 2011–2012: Iceland U21
- 2012–2014: A1 Bregenz
- 2014–2015: SC Magdeburg
- 2016–2018: Iceland
- 2019: Akureyri Handboltafélag
- 2019-2020: HSG Nordhorn-Lingen

Geir Sveinsson (born 27 January 1964) is an Icelandic handball coach and former player who competed in the 1988 Summer Olympics and in the 1992 Summer Olympics.

He was hired as the head coach of Akureyri Handboltafélag in January 2019. In August the same year, he was hired as the head coach of HSG Nordhorn-Lingen.

In July 2022, he was hired as the mayor of Hveragerði. He stepped down as mayor in March 2024.
