= Ágúst Elí Björgvinsson =

Icelandic handball player (born 1995)

Personal information
- Nationality: Icelandic
- Born: 11 April 1995 (age 31) Reykjavík, Iceland
- Height: 1.89 m (6 ft 2 in)

Sport
- Sport: Handball
- Position: Goalkeeper
- Current club: Ribe-Esbjerg HH
- Number: 16

Senior clubs
- Years: Team
- 2012–2018: FH
- 2018–2020: IK Sävehof
- 2020–2022: KIF Kolding
- 2022–: Ribe-Esbjerg HH
National team
Years	Team	Apps	(Gls)
2017–	Iceland	53	(3)
- Updated on 11 February 2025

Ágúst Elí Björgvinsson (born 11 April 1995) is an Icelandic handball player for Ribe-Esbjerg HH and the Icelandic national team.

== Career ==
Ágúst Elí Björgvinsson played until 2018 for the Icelandic team FH Hafnarfjörður. He then joined Swedish IK Sävehof, where he won the 2019 Swedish championship. In 2020 he joined Danish KIF Kolding. In 2022 he joined league rivals Ribe-Esbjerg HH, where he has a contract until the end of the 2025–26 season.

== National team ==
Björgvinsson debuted for the Icelandic national team in 2017. His first major international tournament was at the 2018 European Men's Handball Championship, where Iceland finished 13th. He then played at the 2021 World Championship, where Iceland finished 20th, at the 2022 European Championship, where they finished 6th and the 2023 and 2025 World Championships.
