= Motoki Sakai =

Japanese handball player (born 1995)

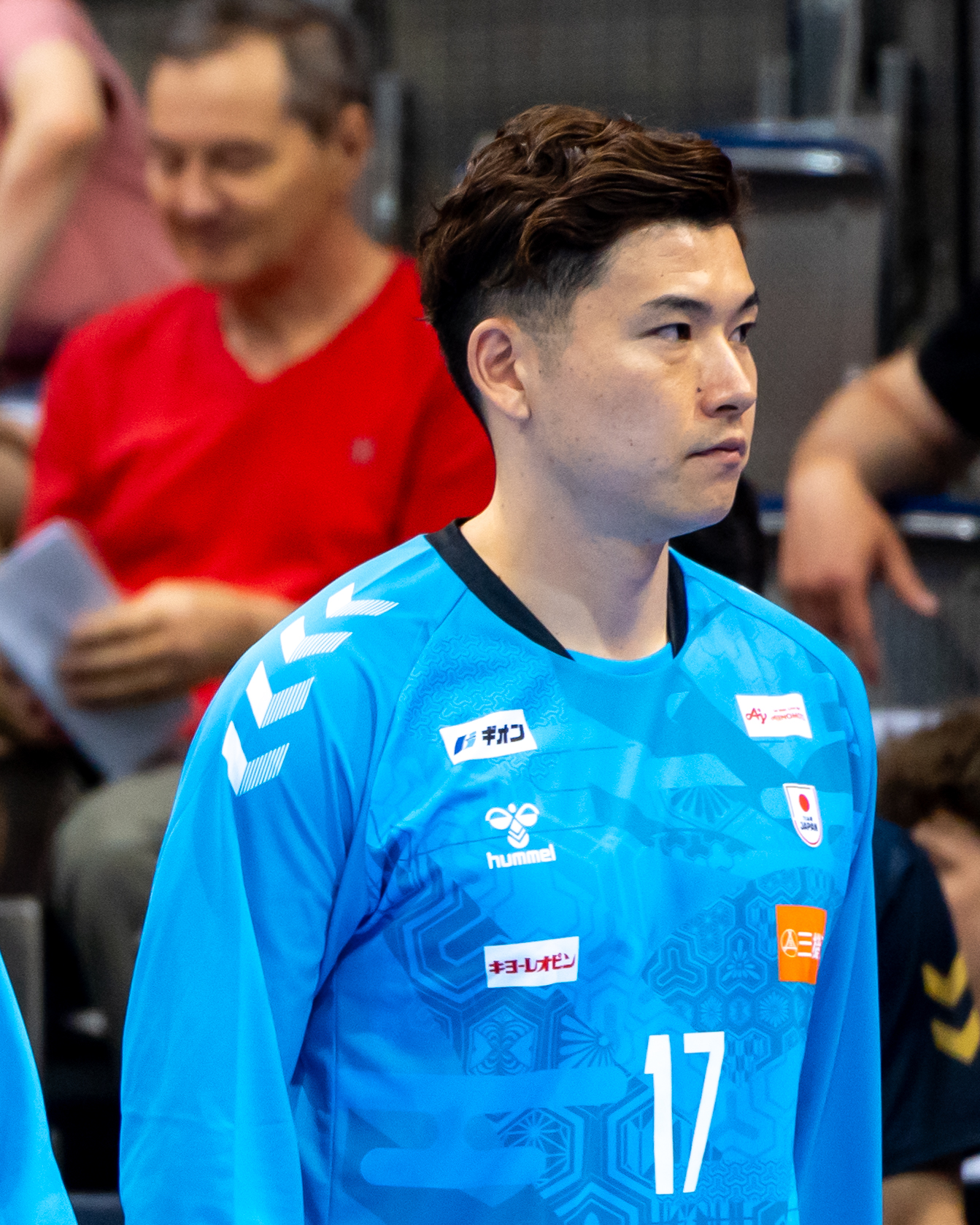

Personal information
- Nationality: Japanese
- Born: 10 November 1995 (age 30) Isehara, Japan
- Height: 1.92 m (6 ft 4 in)

Sport
- Sport: Handball
Medal record
Asian Championship
| Silver medal – second place | 2024 Bahrain |

Motoki Sakai (born 10 November 1995) is a Japanese handball player. He competed in the 2020 Summer Olympics, held July–August 2021 in Tokyo.
