= Fram (men's handball) =

Fram Reykjavík
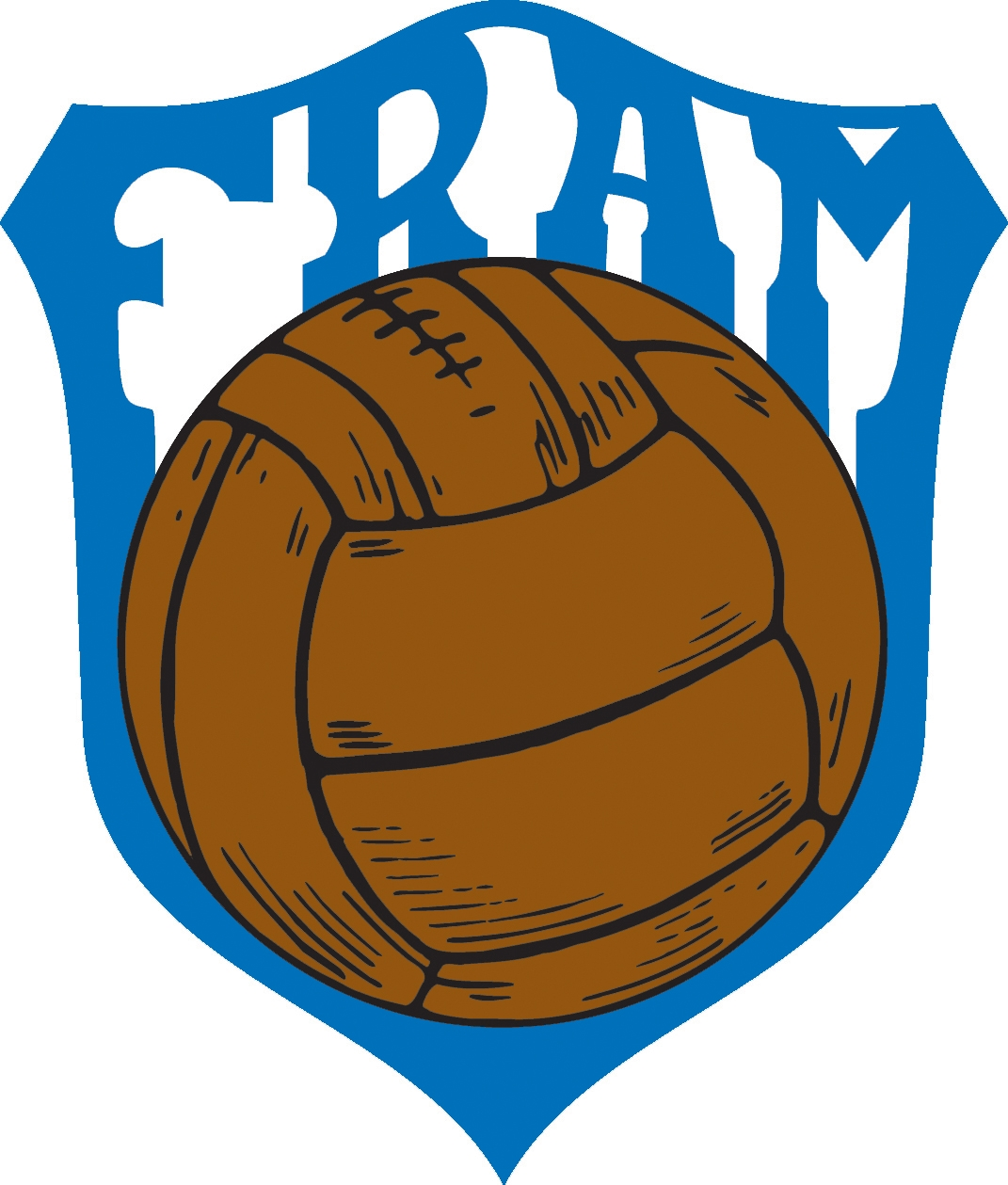
- Full name: Fram Reykjavik
- Short name: Fram
- Founded: 1940
- Arena: Fram Sportshall
- Capacity: 2,200
- President: Gísli Freyr Valdórsson
- Head coach: Einar Jónsson
- League: Úrvalsdeild karla
- 2024-25: 1st
- Club colours
Home	Away

The Fram men's handball team is the men's handball section of Icelandic multi-sport club Fram from Reykjavík. Fram currently plays in the Úrvalsdeild karla. In 2006, they won their first championship in 34 years. They competed in EHF Champions League 2006-2007 the following season. Fram won their tenth Icelandic championship title in 2013.

Fram won the double for the first time in the club's history when the team became Icelandic Champion and Icelandic Cup Champion in the 2024-25 season. They competed in the 2025–26 EHF European League the following season.

== Trophies ==
- Icelandic Champions (11):
  - 1950, 1962, 1963, 1964, 1966, 1967, 1970, 1972, 2006, 2013, 2025
- Icelandic Cup: (2):
  - 2000, 2025
- Icelandic League Cup (2)::
  - 2008, 2009

== Team ==
Squad for the 2024-25 season.

Goalkeepers

- 1 (Iceland) Arnór Máni Daðason
- 16 (Iceland) Breki Hrafn Árnason
- 12 (Iceland) Garpur Druzin Gylfason

Wingers
RW

- 13 (Iceland) Eiður Rafn Valsson
- 24 (Iceland) Arnar Snær Magnússon
- 18 (Iceland) Ólafur Jóhann Magnússon

LW

- 34 (Iceland) Ívar Logi Styrmisson
- 10 (Iceland) Theodór Sigurðsson

Line players

- 22 (Iceland) Dagur Fannar Möller
- 27 (Iceland) Erlendur Guðmundsson
- 18 (Iceland) Daníel Stefán Reynisson
- 4 (Iceland) Sigurður Bjarki Jónsson
- 38 (Iceland) Kristófer Tómas Gíslason

Back players
LB

- 19 (Finland) Þorsteinn Gauti Hjálmarsson
- 95 (Iceland) Tryggvi Garðar Jónsson
- 9 (Iceland) Marel Baldvinsson
- 17 (Iceland) Tindur Ingólfsson

CB

- 8 (Iceland) Magnús Øder Einarsson (C)
- 23 (Iceland) Reynir Þór Stefánsson
- 14 (Iceland) Lúðvík Thorberg B Arnkelsson
- 47 (Iceland) Arnþór Sævarsson

RB

- 5 (Iceland) Rúnar Kárason
- 25 (Iceland) Kjartan Þór Júlíusson
- 7 (Iceland) Max Emil Stenlund

=== Technical staff ===
- Head coach: (Iceland) Einar Jónsson
- Assistant coach: (Iceland) Haraldur Þorvarðarson
- Physiotherapist: (Iceland) Ísak Sigfússon

=== Transfers ===
Transfers for the 2026–27 season

Joining

Leaving

- (Iceland) Breki Hrafn Árnason (GK) to (Portugal) S.L. Benfica

=== Transfer History ===
Transfers for the 2025–26 season

Joining

Leaving

- (Iceland) Tryggvi Jónsson (LB) to (Austria) Alpla HC Hard

== Former club members ==
=== Notable former players ===
- (Iceland) Reynir Þór Stefánsson (2021-2025)
- (Iceland) Haraldur Þorvarðarson ()
- (Iceland) Arnar Freyr Arnarsson (2013-2016)
- (Denmark) Per Skaarup
