= FH (men's handball) =

Icelandic handball club

FH Hafnarfjarðar
- Full name: Fimleikafélag Hafnarfjarðar
- Short name: FH
- Founded: 1929; 97 years ago
- Arena: Iprottamidstöd Kapliakrika, Hafnarfjörður
- Head coach: Sigursteinn Arndal
- League: Úrvalsdeild karla
- Club colours
Home	Away

The FH (men's handball) team, commonly referred to as FH, is the men's handball department of Fimleikafélag Hafnarfjarðar (English: Hafnarfjörður Gymnastics Club), club from Hafnarfjörður, that plays in the Úrvalsdeild karla. It was founded in 1929 as a gymnastics club but soon started a handball department which became its flagship for several decades.

Location of FH

== Crest, colours, supporters ==
=== Kit manufacturers ===
Period	Kit manufacturer
2019	(Germany) Adidas
2019 - present	(Germany) Puma

=== Kits ===
HOME
2016–18	2018–19	2019-22	2022-23	2023-24

AWAY
2018–19	2019-22	2022-24

== Team ==
=== Current squad ===
Squad for the 2023–24 season

FH

Goalkeepers

- 1 (Iceland) Daníel Freyr Andrésson
- 12 (Iceland) Birkir Fannar Bragasson
- 16 (Iceland) Axel Hreinn Hilmisson
- 32 (Iceland) Kristján Rafn Oddsson

Left Wingers

- 15 (Iceland) Jakob Martin Ásgeirsson
- 22 (Iceland) Einar Bragi Aðalsteinsson
- 23 (Iceland) Róbert Dagur Davíðsson
- 48 (Iceland) Simon Michael Gudjónsson

Right Wingers

- 9 (Iceland) Leonhard Thorgeir Harðarson
- 26 (Iceland) Birgir Már Birgisson

Line Players

- 2 (Iceland) Ágúst Birgisson
- 18 (Iceland) Daníel Matthíasson
- 19 (Iceland) Jón Bjarni Ólafsson

Central Backs

- 4 (Iceland) Aron Pálmarsson
- 5 (Iceland) Ásbjörn Friðriksson
- 24 (Iceland) Einar Örn Sindrason
- 34 (Iceland) Garðar Ingi Sindrason

Left Backs

- 14 (Iceland) Atli Steinn Arnarson
- 27 (Iceland) Ingvar Dagur Gunnarsson

Right Backs

- 3 (Iceland) Thorir Ingi Thorsteinsson
- 33 (Iceland) Jóhannes Berg Andrason

=== Technical staff ===
- Head coach: (Iceland) Sigursteinn Arndal
- Assistant coach: (Iceland) Einar Andri Einarsson
- Coach: (Iceland) Omar Fridriksson
- Physiotherapist: (Iceland) Alexander Pétur Kristjánsson

=== Transfers ===
Transfers for the 2026–27 season

Joining

Leaving

- (Iceland) Garðar Ingi Sindrason (CB) to (Germany) VfL Gummersbach

=== Transfer History ===
Transfers for the 2025–26 season

Joining

Leaving

- (Iceland) Jóhannes Berg Andrason (RB) to (Denmark) TTH Holstebro

Transfers for the 2023–24 season

Joining

- (Iceland) Aron Pálmarsson (CB) from (Denmark) Aalborg Håndbold
- (Iceland) Daníel Freyr Andrésson (GK) from (Denmark) Lemvig-Thyborøn Håndbold

Leaving

== Accomplishments ==
=== Domestic ===
- Úrvalsdeild karla
  - Winner (17) : 1956, 1957, 1959, 1960, 1961, 1965, 1966, 1969, 1971, 1974, 1976, 1984, 1985, 1990, 1992, 2011, 2024
- Icelandic Men's Handball Cup
  - Winner (6) : 1975, 1976, 1977, 1992, 1994, 2019

== EHF ranking ==
As of 5/12/2025

Rank	Team	Points
76	(Poland) Chrobry Głogów	69
77	(Italy) Raimond Sassari	67
78	(Czech Republic) HC Dukla Prague	67
79	(Iceland) FH	66
80	(Portugal) ABC Braga	66
81	(Germany) Frisch Auf Göppingen	65
82	(Romania) AHC Potaissa Turda	64

== Former club members ==
=== Notable former players ===
- (Iceland) Geir Hallsteinsson
- (Iceland) Kristján Arason (–1985, 1991–1994)
- (Iceland) Bergsveinn Bergsveinsson (1986–1997, 1999-2001)
- (Iceland) Ágúst Elí Björgvinsson (2012–2018)
- (Iceland) Logi Geirsson (2000–2004, 2010-2012)
- (Iceland) Ólafur Guðmundsson (2007–2010)
- (Iceland) Ólafur Gústafsson (2006-2012, 2024-)
- (Iceland) Guðmundur Hrafnkelsson (1989-1991)
- (Iceland) Ragnar Jóhannsson (2011–2015)
- (Iceland) Gísli Kristjánsson (2015-2018)
- (Iceland) Aron Pálmarsson (2005–2009, 2023-)
- (Iceland) Óðinn Þór Ríkharðsson (2016–2018)
- (Iceland) Bjarni Valdimarsson (2017–2020)
- (Greenland) Hans Peter Motzfeldt-Kyed (1994–1995)
- (South Korea) Seok-Hyung Lee (1996–1998)
