= Icelandic Men's Handball Cup =

Handball competition in Iceland

- Sport: Handball
- Founded: 1974
- First season: 1974-75 season
- Country: Iceland
- Continent: (European Union) Europe
- Most recent champions: Haukar (8th title)
- Most titles: Valur (13 titles)
- Broadcaster: RÚV
- Related competitions: Úrvalsdeild karla
- Website: hsi.is

The Icelandic Men's Handball Cup (Icelandic: Bikarkeppni karla í handknattleik), also known as the Coca-Cola Cup since 2013 for sponsorship reasons, is an annual handball competition between clubs in Iceland. It is run by the Icelandic Handball Association.

The current title holders are Haukar who won their 8th title.

== Titles ==
Team	Titles	Years
Valur	13	1974, 1988, 1990, 1993, 1998, 2008, 2009, 2011, 2016, 2017,2021,2022,2024
Haukar	8	1980, 1997, 2001, 2002, 2010, 2012, 2014, 2026
Víkingur Reykjavík	6	1978, 1979, 1983, 1984, 1985, 1986
FH	6	1975, 1976, 1977, 1992, 1994, 2019
ÍBV	4	1991, 2015, 2018, 2020
Stjarnan	4	1987, 1989, 2006, 2007
KA	3	1995, 1996, 2004
Fram	2	2000, 2025
Íþróttafélag Reykjavíkur	2	2005, 2013
UMF Afturelding	2	1999, 2023
Þróttur Reykjavík	1	1981
Knattspyrnufélag Reykjavíkur	1	1982
Handknattleiksfélag Kópavogs	1	2003
