= Úrvalsdeild karla (handball) =

Highest men's handball competition among clubs in Iceland

- Current season, competition or edition: 2024–25 Úrvalsdeild karla
- Sport: Handball
- Founded: 1940
- No. of teams: 12
- Country: Iceland
- Confederation: EHF
- Most recent champion: Valur (25 titles)
- Most titles: Valur (25 titles)
- Broadcaster: Stöð 2 Sport
- Relegation to: 1. deild karla
- International cups: EHF Cup; EHF Challenge Cup
- Website: Official website

Úrvalsdeild karla (English: Men's Premier League), also known as Olís deild karla for sponsorship reasons, is the highest men's handball competition among clubs in Iceland, where play determines the national champion. It is managed by the Icelandic Handball Association. Started in 1939, the Úrvalsdeild karla is the third-oldest national indoor handball championship in the world, after the Danish and Swedish championships which were started in 1935 and 1931 respectively. With 23 titles won so far, Valur is the record champion, while Haukar are holding a world record for enduring the longest time gap between two national titles with 57 years passing between their first win in 1943 and their second (of 11 in total so far) in 2000.

FH won the title in 2011 after a win against Akureyri Handboltafélag in front of a record crowd of 2950 people in Kaplakriki.

== 2024/25 Season participants ==
The following 12 clubs compete in the Olís deild karla during the 2025–26 season.

Team	City	Arena
Afturelding	Mosfellsbær	Íþróttamiðstöðin Varmá
FH	Hafnarfjörður	Kaplakriki
Þór	Akureyri	Höllin Akureyri
Fram	Reykjavík	Úlfársdal
Selfoss	Selfoss	Set höllin
Haukar	Hafnarfjörður	Ásvellir
HK	Kópavogur	Kórinn
KA	Akureyri	KA heimilið
Stjarnan	Garðabær	TM Höllin
Valur	Reykjavík	Origo höllin
ÍBV	Vestmannaeyjar	Vestmannaeyjar
ÍR	Reykjavík	Skógarseli

== Úrvalsdeild karla past champions ==
Various formats have been used to decide the champions from round-robin to best-of-5 series.

- 1940 : Valur
- 1941 : Valur (2)
- 1942 : Valur (3)
- 1943 : Haukar
- 1944 : Valur (4)
- 1945 : Ármann
- 1946 : ÍR Reykjavik
- 1947 : Valur (5)
- 1948 : Valur (6)
- 1949 : Ármann (2)
- 1950 : Fram
- 1951 : Valur (7)
- 1952 : Ármann (3)
- 1953 : Ármann (4)
- 1954 : Ármann (5)
- 1955 : Valur (8)
- 1956 : FH
- 1957 : FH (2)
- 1958 : Knattspyrnufélag Reykjavíkur
- 1959 : FH (3)
- 1960 : FH(4)
- 1961 : FH (5)
- 1962 : Fram (2)
- 1963 : Fram (3)
- 1964 : Fram (4)
- 1965 : FH (6)
- 1966 : FH (7)
- 1967 : Fram (5)
- 1968 : Fram (6)
- 1969 : FH (8)
- 1970 : Fram (7)
- 1971 : FH (9)
- 1972 : Fram (8)
- 1973 : Valur (9)
- 1974 : FH (10)
- 1975 : Víkingur Reykjavik
- 1976 : FH (11)
- 1977 : Valur (10)
- 1978 : Valur (11)
- 1979 : Valur (12)
- 1980 : Víkingur Reykjavik (2)
- 1981 : Víkingur Reykjavik (3)
- 1982 : Víkingur Reykjavik (4)
- 1983 : Víkingur Reykjavik (5)
- 1984 : FH (12)
- 1985 : FH (13)
- 1986 : Víkingur Reykjavik (6)
- 1987 : Víkingur Reykjavik (7)
- 1988 : Valur (13)
- 1989 : Valur (14)
- 1990 : FH (14)
- 1991 : Valur (15)
- 1992 : FH (15)
- 1993 : Valur (16)
- 1994 : Valur (17)
- 1995 : Valur (18)
- 1996 : Valur (19)
- 1997 : KA Akureyri
- 1998 : Valur (20)
- 1999 : UMF Afturelding
- 2000 : Haukar (2)
- 2001 : Haukar (3)
- 2002 : KA Akureyri(2)
- 2003 : Haukar (4)
- 2004 : Haukar (5)
- 2005 : Haukar (6)
- 2006 : Fram (9)
- 2007 : Valur (21)
- 2008 : Haukar (7)
- 2009 : Haukar (8)
- 2010 : Haukar (9)
- 2011 : FH (16)
- 2012 : Handknattleiksfélag Kópavogs
- 2013 : Fram (10)
- 2014 : ÍBV
- 2015 : Haukar (10)
- 2016 : Haukar (11)
- 2017 : Valur (22)
- 2018 : ÍBV (2)
- 2019 : Selfoss
- 2020 : Not awarded due to the COVID-19 pandemic
- 2021 : Valur (23)
- 2022 : Valur (24)
- 2023 : ÍBV(3)
- 2024 : FH(17)
- 2025 : Fram(11)
- 2026 : Valur(25)

	Club	Titles	Years won
1.	Valur	25	1940, 1941, 1942, 1944, 1947, 1948, 1951, 1955, 1973, 1977, 1978, 1979, 1988, 1989, 1991, 1993, 1994, 1995, 1996, 1998, 2007, 2017, 2021, 2022, 2026
2.	FH	17	1956, 1957, 1959, 1960, 1961, 1965, 1966, 1969, 1971, 1974, 1976, 1984, 1985, 1990, 1992, 2011, 2024
3.	Haukar	11	1943, 2000, 2001, 2003, 2004, 2005, 2008, 2009, 2010, 2015, 2016
4.	Fram	11	1950, 1962, 1963, 1964, 1967, 1968, 1970, 1972, 2006, 2013, 2025
5.	Víkingur	7	1975, 1980, 1981, 1982, 1983, 1986, 1987
6.	Ármann	5	1945, 1949, 1952, 1953, 1954
7.	ÍBV	3	2014, 2018, 2023
8.	KA Akureyri	2	1997, 2002
9.	ÍR Reykjavik	1	1946
	KR	1	1958
	UMF Afturelding	1	1999
	HK Kópavogur	1	2012
	Selfoss	1	2019

== EHF coefficient ranking ==
For season 2018/2019, see footnote

- 18. (23) (Netherlands) Eredivisie (14,25)
- 19. (18) (Serbia) Rukometna liga Srbije (13,44)
- 20. (27) (Iceland) Úrvalsdeld karla (12.67)
- 21. (19) (Czech Republic) Extraliga (12,57)
- 22. (20) (Slovakia) Extraliga (12,56)

Seasonal Coefficient Ranking Graph.:

Year	2010-11	2011-12	2012-13	2013-14	2014-15	2015-16	2016-17	2017-18
Rank	19	▼20	▼21	▼29	▼33	▼34	▼36	▲27

== See also ==
- Úrvalsdeild karla (disambiguation)
- Úrvalsdeild kvenna (handball), the women's handball league
