= List of churches dedicated to St Olav =

This is a list of church buildings dedicated to Olaf II of Norway:

== List ==
Name	Locality	Country	Age	Notes
St. Olav's Church (ruin)	Bamble	Norway	1150	
Bergen Cathedral	Bergen	Norway	1181	
Sjømannskirken, London	London	England	1927	
St Olave's church, Mitchham	London	England	1931	Replaced medieval Southwark church
St Olave's Church, Chester	Chester	England	11th c.	Current church from 1611
St Olave's Church, Gatcombe	Gatcombe	England	1292	
Sankt Ols Kirke	Olsker	Denmark	11th c.	
St. Olaf Kirche	Breklum	Germany	13th c.	
St. Olaf	Hamburg	Germany	1968	
St Olave's Church, Hart Street	London	England	1450	
Church of St Olave	Fritwell	England	1103	
St Olave's Church	Ruckland	England	1885	
St. Doologe's Church	Wexford	Ireland	11th c.	Demolished in 1649
St. Olaf Lutheran Church	Devils Lake, North Dakota	United States		
St. Olav's Church	Waterford	Ireland	1050	Current building 1730 - 1735, used as hcommunity center.
Sint-Olofskapel	Amsterdam	The Netherlands	1450	Current edifice 1680.
St.Olof's Church	Falköping	Sweden	12th c.	
St. Olof's Church	Helsingborg	Sweden	1956	
St. Olof's Church	Trekanten	Sweden	1925	
St. Olof's Church	Täby	Sweden	1941	
St Olof's Church	Uppsala	Sweden	1983	Demolished 2008
St. Olof's Church	Sankt Olof	Sweden	13th c.	
St Olave's Church, Old Jewry	London	England	9th c.	Current church 1679
St Olave's Church, Silver Street	London	England	10th c.	Demolished
St Olave's Church, Southwark	London	England	11th c.	Demolished
St Olave's Church, Stoke Newington	London	England		
St Olave's Church, York	York	England	c. 1050	Earliest known dedication to St. Olav
St Olaf's Church (Cruden)	Cruden	Scotland	11th c.	original church building abandoned in 13th c. and replaced. Current church building replaced second in 1776
St Olave's Church	Exeter	England	1053	Rebuilt, late 14th c.
St Olaf's Episcopal Church	Kirkwall	Scotland	1876	
St. Olaf's Church	Jyväskylä	Finland	1962	
Chapel of St. Olav	Savonlinna	Finland	1475	Chapel of Olavinlinna castle
St. Olav's Church	Sigtuna	Sweden	1100	
St. Olof's Church	Skellefteå	Sweden	1927	
Skanör Church	Skanör	Sweden	13th c.	
St. Olav's Chapel	Covarrubias	Spain		
St Olavskirken på Avaldsnes	Avaldsnes	Norway	11th c.	
St. Olav's Cathedral, Oslo	Oslo	Norway	1896	
Lemu Church	Masku	Finland	c. 1460.	
St. Olofskapell	Pellinge	Finland	1950s?	
St. Olaf's Church, Jomala	Jomala	Finland	c. 1280	
Närpes Church	Närpes	Finland	1550-1555	Holy Cross & St. Olav
Turku Dominican Church	Turku	Finland	1430s	No remains
Nagu Church	Nagu	Finland	early 15th c.	
Old Vyborg Cathedral	Vyborg	Russia	1435-1445	Former Swedish town. Dedicated to St. Mary & St. Olav.
St. Olav's Cathedral, Trondheim	Trondheim	Norway	1973	Catholic church in Trondheim
St. Olaf's Church, Helsingør	Helsingør	Denmark	13th c.	Current church 1550
Eidsberg Church	Eidsberg	Norway	1250-60	
Sankt Ols Kirke	Bornholm	Denmark	12th c.	
Saint Olav's Church, Kirkjubøur	Kirkjubøur	Faroe Islands	11th c.	
St. Olaf's Church	Tallinn	Estonia	12th c.	
St. Olaf's Church	Nõva	Estonia	18th c.	
St. Olaf's Church	Vormsi	Estonia	nd	
St. Olaf's Church ruins	Väike-Pakri	Estonia	nd	
St. Olaf's Church ruins	Suur-Pakri	Estonia	nd	
St. Olav's Church	Tønsberg	Norway	1191	Tønsberg abbey church, ruins
St. Olaf's church	Tyrvää	Finland	1510–1516	Rebuilt after arson in 1997
St. Olaf's church	Ulvila	Finland	1510	
Lemböte Chapel	Lemland	Finland	1500-1530	Abandoned 16th c., renovated 1890s
Kalvola Sacristy	Kalvola	Finland	1495-1505	Only the sacristy was completed
St. Olaf's Church	Balestrand	Norway	1897	Anglican
St. Olaf's Church	Novgorod	Russia	11th c.	Demolished in the 14th c.
St. Olaf's church	Poughill	England	13th c.	
St. Olaf's Church	Wasdale Head	England	1550	
St Olaf's Church (Balliasta)	Unst	Scotland	nd	
St Olaf's Church (Lunda Wick)	Unst	Scotland	nd	
St Olaf's Church (Voe)	Shetland Islands	Scotland	nd	
Chapel of St. Olav	Rome	Italy	1893	In the church San Carlo al Corso
Holy Olav Chapel	Stiklestad	Norway	2003	Orthodox chapel
St. Olav's Church	Sysmä	Finland	before 1520	
Sankt Olai kyrka	Norrköping	Sweden	14th c.	Rebuilt 1767
St. Olav's Church	Simrishamn	Sweden	12th c.	
St. Olav's Church, Saloinen	Raahe	Finland	15th c.	Burned down in 1930 and was replaced with a new church also dedicated to Saint Olav
St. Olaf Lutheran Church	Red Lodge, Montana	United States	1921	
St Oluf's Church	Aarhus	Denmark	1203	Church ruin
St. Olav's Church	Serampore	India	1806	
St. Olaf Catholic Church	Minneapolis	United States	1941	
St. Olaf Catholic Church	Norge, Virginia	United States		
Saint Olaf Catholic Church and School	Bountiful, UT	United States		
Saint Olave's Anglican Church	Toronto	Canada	1876	Current church 1937
St. Olaf Kirke	Cranfills Gap, Texas	United States	1884	
Uppsala Cathedral	Uppsala	Sweden		

== See also ==
- St. Olaf's Church (disambiguation)
- St. Olave's Church (disambiguation)
