= Oleifr =

Oleifr (also spelled as Óleifr) is an obsolete Old Norse masculine given name. Popular among upper-class nobility during the Viking Age, its roots can be traced back to the Proto-Norse compound *Anu-laibaz. As such, it is split into two elements: *anu-, meaning "ancestor" or "grandfather", and *laibaz, meaning "heirloom", "relic", or "descendant". When combined, it is interpreted to mean "ancestor's relic" or "descendant of the ancestors".

The name is the predecessor to the spelling Óláfr, having shifted over time due to linguistic changes within Scandinavia, alongside eventual Anglicization. The result was the development of modern Scandinavian variants, which include the spelling Ólafur in Icelandic.

While the specific spelling of Óleifr has generally fallen out of use and has no notable modern instances, several of its cognates and etymological derivatives remain active internationally. These include Olaf, Oluf, Olov, Olav, and Olavur.
