= Ólafur =

Ólafur (Icelandic pronunciation: [ˈouːˌlaːvʏr̥]) is a common name in Iceland, derived from the Old Norse Óláfr [ˈoːˌlɑːvz̠], meaning "ancestor's relic".

According to Icelandic custom, people are generally referred to by first and middle names and patronyms are used if disambiguation is required.

The name is a frequently given name in Iceland. In 2005, it was the fifth most common male given name after Gunnar and before Einar. A diminutive form is Óli.

== Notable Icelanders named Ólafur ==
- Bjarni Ólafur Eiríksson (born 1982), football defender
- Guðni Ólafur Guðnason (born 1965), retired basketball player
- Ólafur Adolfsson, Icelandic politician
- Ólafur Arnalds (born 1986), modern composer
- Ólafur Benediktsson (born 1952), former handball player
- Ólafur Egilsson (1564–1639), priest
- Ólafur Elíasson (born 1967), Danish-Icelandic artist
- Ólafur Friðrik Magnússon (born 1952), former mayor of Reykjavík
- Ólafur Garðar Einarsson (1932–2023), politician and former minister
- Ólafur Gottskálksson (born 1968), retired professional football goalkeeper
- Ólafur Guðmundsson, handball player
- Ólafur Haukur Símonarson, (born 1947), playwright and novelist
- Ólafur Ingi Skúlason (born 1983), footballer and a midfielder
- Ólafur Ísleifsson (born 1955), Icelandic economist and politician
- Ólafur Jóhann Ólafsson (born 1962), author
- Ólafur Jóhann Sigurðsson (1918–1988), novelist, short story writer and poet
- Ólafur Jóhannesson (football manager) (born 1957), football manager and former player
- Ólafur Jóhannesson (1913–1984), the fifteenth Prime Minister of Iceland
- Ólafur Jónsson (born 1946), former handball player
- Ólafur Josephsson, musician, better known by the stage name Stafrænn Hákon
- Ólafur Örn Bjarnason (born 1975), football defender
- Ólafur Páll Snorrason (born 1982), international footballer
- Ólafur Ragnar Grímsson (born 1943), the fifth President of Iceland
- Ólafur Stefánsson (born 1973), handball player
- Ólafur Stígsson (born 1975), footballer
- Ólafur Þór Gunnarsson (born 1977), footballer
- Ólafur Þórðarson (footballer) (born 1965), former footballer
- Ólafur Thors (1892–1964), former Prime Minister of Iceland on five occasions

== See also ==
- Óláfr Leggsson, 13th-century Icelandic skald
- Óláfr Þórðarson, Icelandic skald and scholar, born about 1210 and died in 1259
- Olaf (disambiguation)
