= Iceland at the 1972 Summer Olympics =

- IOC code: ISL
- NOC: Olympic Committee of Iceland

in Munich
- Competitors: 25 in 4 sports
- Flag bearer: Geir Hallsteinsson
- Medals: Gold 0 Silver 0 Bronze 0 Total 0

Summer Olympics appearances (overview)
- 1908; 1912; 1920–1932; 1936; 1948; 1952; 1956; 1960; 1964; 1968; 1972; 1976; 1980; 1984; 1988; 1992; 1996; 2000; 2004; 2008; 2012; 2016; 2020; 2024

Iceland competed at the 1972 Summer Olympics in Munich, West Germany.

== Results by event ==
=== Athletics ===
Key

- Note–Ranks given for track events are within the athlete's heat only
- Q = Qualified for the next round
- q = Qualified for the next round as a fastest loser or, in field events, by position without achieving the qualifying target
- NR = National record
- N/A = Round not applicable for the event
- Bye = Athlete not required to compete in round

Men
Track & road events

Athlete	Event	Heat		Quarterfinals		Semifinal		Final	
Athlete	Event	Result	Rank	Result	Rank	Result	Rank	Result	Rank
Bjarni Stefánsson	100 m	10.99	6	did not advance					
Bjarni Stefánsson	400 m	46.76	5	46.92	6	did not advance			
Þorsteinn Þorsteinsson	800 m	1:50.8	6	—N/a		did not advance			

Field events

Athlete	Event	Qualification		Final	
Athlete	Event	Distance	Position	Distance	Position
Erlendur Valdimarsson	discus throw	55.38	23	did not advance	

Women
Field events

Athlete	Event	Qualification		Final	
Athlete	Event	Distance	Position	Distance	Position
Lára Sveinsdóttir	high jump	1.60	37	did not advance	

=== Handball ===
Summary

Key:

- ET – After extra time
- P – Match decided by penalty-shootout.

Team	Event	Preliminary Round			Classification			Main Round			Final / BM / Classification	
Team	Event	Opposition Score	Opposition Score	Opposition Score	Opposition Score	Opposition Score	Rank	Opposition Score	Opposition Score	Opposition Score	Opposition Score	Rank
Iceland men's	Men's tournament	East Germany; L 11–16	Czech Republic; D 19–19	Tunisia; W 27–16	Poland; L 17–20	Japan; L 18–19	12	did not advance				

- Axel Axelsson
- Ólafur Benediktsson
- Björgvin Björgvinsson
- Hjalti Einarsson
- Sigurður Einarsson
- Birgir Finnbogason
- Stefán Gunnarsson
- Geir Hallsteinsson
- Ólafur Jónsson
- Stefán Jónsson
- Jón Magnússon
- Ágúst Ögmundsson
- Sigurbergur Sigsteinsson
- Viðar Símonarson
- Gunnsteinn Skúlason

=== Swimming ===
Men

Athlete	Event	Heat		Semifinal		Final	
Athlete	Event	Time	Rank	Time	Rank	Time	Rank
Finnur Garðarsson	100 m freestyle	55.97	6	did not advance			
Finnur Garðarsson	200 m freestyle	2:08.88	8	—N/a		did not advance	
Friðrik Guðmundsson	400 m freestyle	4:26.25	7	—N/a		did not advance	
Friðrik Guðmundsson	1500 m freestyle	17:32.47	6	—N/a		did not advance	
Guðjón Guðmundsson	100 m breaststroke	1:11.11	8	did not advance			
Guðjón Guðmundsson	200 m breaststroke	2:32.40	4	—N/a		did not advance	
Guðmundur Gíslason	200 m individual medley	2:20.00	5	—N/a		did not advance	
Guðmundur Gíslason	400 m individual medley	5:03.54	7	—N/a		did not advance	

=== Weightlifting ===
Men

Athlete	Event	Military press		Snatch		Jerk		Total	Rank
Athlete	Event	Result	Rank	Result	Rank	Result	Rank	Total	Rank
Guðmundur Sigurðsson	90 kg	142.5		135.0		177.5		455.0	13
Óskar Sigurpálsson	110 kg	177.5		117.5		182.5		477.5	19
