= St. Olaf (disambiguation) =

Saint Olaf (Olaf Haraldsson; c. 995 – 1030) was King of Norway from 1015 to 1028.

St. Olaf or St. Olave or St. Olav may also refer to:

== Institutions ==
- St. Olaf College, a private, liberal arts college in Northfield, Minnesota
- St. Olaf Choir, the a cappella choir of St. Olaf College
- St. Olav's Abbey, Tønsberg

== Places ==
- St Olave Silver Street, London
- St Olave District (Metropolis), London
- St. Olaf, Iowa, city, United States
- St. Olaf Township, Otter Tail County, Minnesota, United States
- Olavinlinna (St. Olaf's Castle), 15th-century castle in Savonlinna, Finland
- St. Olaf, Minnesota, a fictional town often referred to on the television series The Golden Girls
- St. Oluf's Cemetery, Aarhus, Denmark

== Transport ==
- MS St. Olaf (1904–21) a ferry on Snåsavatnet in Norway

== See also ==
- Olaf (disambiguation)
- Olave (disambiguation)
- St. Olaf's Church (disambiguation)
- St. Olave's Church (disambiguation)
