= Óli =

- Gender: Male
- Language: Faroese, Icelandic

Origin
- Origin: Old Norse
- Region of origin: Faroe Islands, Iceland

Other names
- Related names: Ólafur

Óli is a Faroese and Icelandic masculine given name. It is a diminutive of the name Ólafur and Ólavur. People bearing the name Óli include:

- Óli Þorbjörn Guðbjartsson (born 1935), Icelandic politician
- Óli Jógvansson (born 1969), Faroese songwriter and composer
- Óli Johannesen (born 1972), Faroese footballer
- Óli B. Jónsson (1918–2005), Icelandic footballer and manager
- Óli Niklái Skaalum (1849–1924), Faroese teacher and politician
