= BK Astrio =

Swedish football club

- Full name: Bollklubben Astrio
- Founded: 1933
- Ground: Söndrums IP; Halmstad; Sweden
- Chairman: Otto Hallgren
- Coach: Peter Karlsson
- League: Division 2
- 2010: Division 4 Halland Elit, 5th
Home colours	Away colours

BK Astrio is a Swedish association football club located in Halmstad, Sweden. As of 2025, the club plays in Division 2.

== History ==
=== Background ===
BK Astrio was established on July 30, 1933, by Stig and Orvar Nilsson with Eric Andreasson, Torsten Lasson, and Donald Lasson. The founding members were impressed by the Austrian team Astrio Vienna when they played against Halmstads BK. They thought Astrio was unique and decided to register their team under that name.

The team colors were red shirts with black pants and black socks. The team record for their first year was 5–2–1. The following season they played 33 matches with a 13–7–13 record. The team arranged for games to be played in Onsjö park with much success. By the end of the year, BK Astrio had 29 members. In 1935, the club started a handball division. In 1936, the team changed their colors and began to play with a green jersey and green socks. From 1937 to 1939, the club did not participate in any games due to World War II. The team resumed play in 1940. The team played for the first time in Division 2 Halland Halmstadserien Series and won it with 13–3–2 record. In 1941, the team advanced to Division 1 Södra Halland where they stayed until 1943. The team bounced in and out of Division 1 throughout the 1940s.

On January 20, 1952, introduced Eric Andreasson in a new sports stadium located at Basta Liden later Jutarums IP. In 1953, the club was relegated to Division 3 but was promoted the following year. In 1957, the club was placed seventh in Division 1. On July 18, 1958, the youth division was formed. In 1968, the divisions were renamed and BK Astrio was subsequently placed in Division 5 South Halland. In 1974, the team advanced to Division 4.

In 1980, BK Astrio made it to the Division 3 qualifiers to advance to Division 2. The team met with Vastra Frolunda, Trelleborgs FF and Alvesta and opened at home against Alvesta, where the team lost. During the 1991–1993 seasons, BK Astrio played in Division 2. During this time, the team brought up several talented players such as Mats Jingblad and Erik Wahlstedt who both played Allsvenskan and represented the national team. Other notable players are Stefan Jönsson and Nils Backstrom.

In 1992, the club sold Erik Wahlstedt to IFK Göteborg which helped the financial security of the club. In 2000, a new stadium at Hallägra was constructed. On August 17, 2002, Söndrums IP was opened.

BK Astrio are affiliated to the Hallands Fotbollförbund.

=== Youth Side ===
In 2004, the youth side P91 won their division. The following year P91 won again as well as the P93 youth side. The youth team was successful and in 2006, Per Gulda was selected for the Swedish Under 15 squad. The following year Gulda was picked for the Under 16 team under Abuu Eriksson.

=== Women's Side ===
In 1978, BK Astrio added a women's side which has been very successful. Two years later in 1980, they won Division 5 South Halland. The following year, the women were placed fourth in Division 4. In 1982, the women's team won Division 4 Halland. In 1983, they won Division 3. In 1988, the women's team advanced to Division 2 and won the division. In 1989, the team advanced to Division 1 and achieved fifth place. The women's team won Division 1 in 1990. The team played in Division 1 throughout the 1990s. In 1999, the women won Division 1. In 2001, the women were relegated to Division 2, the first time in the club's history. In 2002, the women won Division 2 and were promoted to Söderettan. By 2006, the ladies were playing in Division 3 Halland.

== Season to season ==
Season	Level	Division	Section	Position	Movements
1990	Tier 4	Division 3	Södra Götaland	2nd	Promoted
1991	Tier 3	Division 2	Västra Götaland	5th	Vårserier (Spring Series)
	Tier 3	Division 2	Södra Götaland	4th	Höstserier (Autumn Series)
1992	Tier 3	Division 2	Södra Götaland	7th	Vårserier (Spring Series)
	Tier 3	Division 2	Södra Götaland	3rd	Höstserier (Autumn Series)
1993	Tier 3	Division 2	Södra Götaland	11th	Relegated
1994	Tier 4	Division 3	Södra Götaland	11th	Relegated
1995	Tier 5	Division 4	Halland	3rd	
1996	Tier 5	Division 4	Halland	9th	
1997	Tier 5	Division 4	Halland	9th	
1998	Tier 5	Division 4	Halland	4th	
1999	Tier 5	Division 4	Halland	2nd	
2000	Tier 5	Division 4	Halland	4th	
2001	Tier 5	Division 4	Halland	2nd	Promotion Playoffs
2002	Tier 5	Division 4	Halland	5th	
2003	Tier 5	Division 4	Halland	2nd	Promotion Playoffs
2004	Tier 5	Division 4	Halland	2nd	Promotion Playoffs
2005	Tier 5	Division 4	Halland	2nd	Promotion Playoffs – Promoted
2006*	Tier 5	Division 3	Sydvästra Götaland	9th	Relegation Playoffs – Relegated
2007	Tier 6	Division 4	Halland	6th	
2008	Tier 6a	Division 4	Halland Elit	11th	Relegated
2009	Tier 6b	Division 4	Halland	3rd	Promoted
2010	Tier 6a	Division 4	Halland Elit	5th	
2011	Tier 6a	Division 4	Halland Elit	10th	
2012	Tier 6a	Division 4	Halland Elit	10th	
2013	Tier 6a	Division 4	Halland Elit	7th	

* League restructuring in 2006 resulted in a new division being created at Tier 3 and subsequent divisions dropping a level.

== Attendances ==
In recent seasons BK Astrio have had the following average attendances:

Season	Average attendance	Division / Section	Level
2006	154	Div 3 Sydvästra Götaland	Tier 5
2007	Not available	Div 4 Halland	Tier 6
2008	Not available	Div 4 Halland Elit	Tier 6
2009	83	Div 4 Halland	Tier 6
2010	138	Div 4 Halland Elit	Tier 6

* Attendances are provided in the Publikliga sections of the Svenska Fotbollförbundet website.

== Coaches ==
Year	Coach
1933–1940	Self trained
1941	Eric Andreasson
1942	Edvin Vibo
1943–1947	Torsten Lasson
1948–1952	Stig Fika Carlsson
1953	Tortsen Lasson
1954–1955	Sigo Bjers
1956–1958	Sven Malmberg
1959–1960	Hans Åke Johansson
1961–1962	Essbjörn Persson
1963	Ingemar Pettersson
1964–1965	Frank Johansson
1966	Kenneth Håkansson
1967–1969	Carl Axel Bengtsso
1970	Lars Olof Jingbladh
1971	Hans Åke Johansson / Kurt Johansson
1972	Matias Toth
1974	Lars Olof Jingbladh
1975–1977	Rolf Johansson Block
1978–1980	Olle Eriksson
1981–1982	Kjell Åke Nilsson
1983–1985	Robin Buhr
1986–1987	Lars Olof Jingbladh
1988–1991	Mats Jingbladh
1992	Lenart Ljung
1993–1994	Ulf Sjölin
1995–1996	Mikael Bengtsson
1998–2001	Kenneth Sjöblom
2002–2003	Stefan Jonsson
2004–2006	Peter Lennartsson
2007–2008	Nils Bäckström
2009–	Ulf Sjölin

== Chairman ==
Year	Chairman
1933–1934	Ebbe Svensson
1935–1936	Sture Jonsson
1937	Folke Pehrsson
1938–1944	Botvid Bengtsson
1945–1946	Tage Jonsson
1947–1953	Ake Rolf
1954–1956	Hugo JOhansson
1957–1959	Tortsen Lasson
1960	Sven Arne Nilsson
1961–1964	Thure Rehngren
1965–1974	Börje Klang
1975–1986	Ingvar Andersson
1987–1992	Bengt Boström
1993–1996	Rolf Elver
1997–2005	Anders Karlsson
2006–	Otto Hallgren
