= Olov =

Olov (or Olof) is a Swedish form of Olav/Olaf, meaning "ancestor's descendant". A common short form of the name is Olle. The name may refer to:

- Olle Åberg (1925–2013), Swedish middle-distance runner
- Olle Åhlund (1920–1996), Swedish footballer
- Olle Anderberg (1919–2003), Swedish wrestler in the Olympic Games
- Olle Andersson (speedway rider) (1932–2017), Swedish speedway rider
- Olle Andersson (tennis) (1895–1974), Swedish tennis player
- Olof Bjurström (1917–1989), Swedish diplomat
- Olov Englund (born 1983), Swedish bandy player
- Olof Forssberg (1938–2023), Swedish jurist and civil servant
- Olle Hagnell (1924–2011), Swedish psychiatrist
- Olle Hellbom (1925–1982), Swedish film director
- Olof Johansson (born 1937), Swedish politician
- Olof Kaijser (1914–2002), Swedish diplomat
- Olov Lambatunga, Archbishop of Uppsala, Sweden, 1198–1206
- Olle Larsson (1928–1960), Swedish rower
- Olof Mellberg (born 1977), Swedish footballer
- Olof Mörck (born 1981), Swedish guitarist and songwriter, member of Amaranthe
- Olle Nordemar (1914–1999), Swedish film director, editor, producer, cinematographer and screenwriter
- Olof Palme (1927–1986), Swedish Prime Minister 1969–1976 and 1982–1986
- Olof Ripa (1909–1992), Swedish diplomat
- Olle Romo, musician
- Olof Rudbeck (1630–1702), internationally known as Olaus Rudbeck (as he wrote his name like that in Latin), Swedish scientist
- Olof Skoglund (1925–2018), Swedish diplomat
- Olof Skötkonung (c. 980–1022), king of Sweden 995–1022
- Olov Svebilius, Archbishop of Uppsala, Sweden, 1681–1700
- Olof Swartz (1760–1818), Swedish scientist
- Olle Tandberg (1918–1996), Swedish heavyweight boxer, European champion
- Olof Thorin (1912–2004), Swedish mathematician
- Olle Thorell (born 1967), Swedish politician
- Olle Wästberg (born 1945), Swedish journalist, politician and diplomat

== Fictional characters ==
- Olof Koskela, a main character of the novel The Song of the Blood-Red Flower by Johannes Linnankoski

== See also ==
- Per-Olov, a list of people with the given name
- Sven-Olov, a list of people with the given name
- Olle, a list of people with the given name or surname
