= Olle =

Olle is a masculine given name, often a short form (hypocorism) of Olof, and a surname. It may refer to:

== Given name or nickname ==
- Olle Åberg (1925–2013), Swedish middle-distance runner
- Olle Åhlund (1920–1996), Swedish footballer
- Olle Ericsson (disambiguation)
- Olle Felten (born 1953), Swedish politician
- Olle Hagnell (1924–2011), Swedish psychiatrist
- Olle Håkansson (1927–2001), Swedish footballer
- Olle Håkansson (curler) (born 1956), Swedish retired curler and coach
- Olle Hellbom (1925–1982), Swedish film director, producer, and screenwriter
- Olle Hjortzberg (1872–1959), Swedish painter and illustrator
- Olle Johansson (sailor) (born 1957), Swedish sailor
- Olle Johansson (swimmer) (1927–1994), Swedish swimmer and water polo player
- Olle Langert (1924–2016), Swedish painter and sculptor
- Olle Länsberg (1922–1998), Swedish screenwriter
- Olle Larsson (1928–1960), Swedish rower
- Olle Lind, Swedish jazz trombonist
- Olle Ljungström (1961–2016), Swedish singer, songwriter and musician
- Olle Möller (1906–1983), Swedish-American long-distance runner and convicted murderer
- Olle Nordberg (golfer) (born 1967), Swedish golfer
- Olle Nordberg (painter) (1905–1986), Swedish painter
- Olle Nordemar (1914–1999), Swedish film director, editor, producer, cinematographer and screenwriter
- Olle Råde (born 1978), Swedish professional Magic: The Gathering player
- Olle Romo (fl. 1982-?), Swedish music producer, songwriter and drummer
- Olle Tandberg (1918–1996), Swedish heavyweight boxer, European champion
- Olle Thorell (born 1967), Swedish politician
- Olle Wästberg (born 1945), Swedish journalist, politician and diplomat

== Surname ==
- Alan Olle (1924–2004), Australian rules footballer
- Andrew Olle (1947–1995), Australian radio and television presenter
- Nick Olle (born 1974) Australian journalist
- T. William Olle (1933 – March 2019) was a British computer scientist

== Stage name ==
- Olle i Skratthult (Olle from Laughtersville), stage name of Hjalmar Peterson (1886–1960), Swedish singer and comedian

== Other uses ==
- Olle (올레), traditional walled paths to houses in Jeju Island, Korea
  - Jeju Olle Trail
  - Seogwipo Maeil Olle Market
  - Mongol Olle Trail

== See also ==
- Alain Junior Ollé Ollé (born 1987), Cameroonian retired footballer
- Bertin Ollé Ollé (born 1961), Cameroonian retired footballer
