= Sigurður Einarsson =

Sigurður Einarsson may refer to:

- Sigurður Einarsson (javelin thrower) (born 1962), former Icelandic javelin thrower
- Sigurður Einarsson (economist) (born 1960), former CEO and then chairman of failed Icelandic Kaupthing Bank
- Sigurður Einarsson (handballer) (born 1943), Icelandic former handball player
- Sigurður Einarsson (footballer) (born 1943), Icelandic former football player
