= Olaf =

Olaf or Olav (/ˈoʊləf/, /ˈoʊlɑːf/, or British /ˈoʊlæf/; Old Norse: Áleifr, Ólafr, Óleifr, Anleifr) is a Dutch, Polish, Scandinavian and German given name. It is presumably of Proto-Norse origin, reconstructed as *Anu-laibaz, from anu "ancestor, grand-father" and laibaz "heirloom, descendant". Old English forms are attested as Ǣlāf, Anlāf. The corresponding Old Novgorod dialect form is Uleb. A later English form of the name is Olave.

In the Norwegian language, Olav and Olaf are equally common, but Olav is traditionally used when referring to Norwegian royalty. The Swedish form is Olov or Olof, and the Danish form is Oluf. It was borrowed into Old Irish and Scottish Gaelic with the spellings Amlaíb and Amhlaoibh, giving rise to modern version Aulay. The name is Latinized as Olaus.

== Notable people ==
=== North Germanic ===
==== Denmark ====
- Olaf I of Denmark, king 1086–1095
- Olaf II of Denmark, also Olaf IV of Norway
- Oluf Haraldsen (died c. 1143), Danish nobleman who ruled Scania for a few years from 1139

==== Norway ====
- Olaf Haraldsson Geirstadalf (c.877–c.934), Norwegian petty king
- Olaf I of Norway Tryggvason, 969–1000
- Olaf II of Norway, or Saint Olaf, ruled 1015–1030
- Olaf III of Norway, king 1067–1093
- Olaf Magnusson (formerly IV) of Norway, 1103–1110
- Olaf IV of Norway, king 1370 – 23 August 1387; was also Olaf II of Denmark

==== Sweden ====
- Olaf of Sweden (disambiguation) (I, II and III)

=== Norse-Gaelic ===
Not all the following were strictly Norse-Gaels, but they share the most common Norse-Gaelic names.

- Olaf the Black, 13th-century Norse king
- Amlaíb Conung (King Olaf), King of Dublin, possibly identical with Olaf the White
- Olaf III Guthfrithson (Emlaíb mac Gofraid), King of Dublin
- Amlaíb Ua Donnubáin (Auliffe O'Donovan), regional Irish king

==== Mann and the Isles ====
- Olaf I of Mann, also called Olaf Godredsson (c. 1080–1153)
- Olaf II the Black, also called Olaf Godredsson (1173/4–1237), King of Mann and the Isles 1229–1237

=== Novgorod Republic (in Ukraine or Kievan Rus') ===
- Uleb Ragnvaldsson, son of Ragnvald Ulfsson jarl of Staraja Ladoga (Aldeigjuborg), military leader of Novgorod Republic in conquering of Yugra in 1032

=== Scotland ===
- Amlaíb, King of Scotland (971–977)

=== Modern people ===
==== Given name ====
- Olav V of Norway, king 1957–1991
- Olaf Amundsen (1876–1939), Norwegian lawyer and politician
- Olav Bolland (born 1962), Norwegian academic engineer
- Olaf Fink (1914–1973), American educator and state senator
- Olaf Gorter (born 2005), Dutch footballer
- Olaf Lubaszenko, Polish actor
- Olaf Pooley (1914–2015), English actor
- Count Oluf of Rosenborg (1923–1990)
- Olaf Scholz (born 1958), German politician and Chancellor of Germany (2021–2025)
- Olaf C. Seltzer (1877–1957), Danish-born American painter
- Olaf Stapledon (1886–1950), British author and historian
- Oluf van Steenwinckel (died 1659), Danish building master and engineer

==== Middle name ====
- Erwin Olaf (Erwin Olaf Springveld), Dutch photographer

== Fictional characters ==
- Count Olaf, the main antagonist in the series of novels A Series of Unfortunate Events by Lemony Snicket
- Olaf, in Jungle Jam and Friends: The Radio Show!
- Olaf (Frozen), a living snowman in the 2013 film Frozen
- Olaf the Troll, in the TV series Buffy the Vampire Slayer
- Olaf, one of Snoopy's siblings in Peanuts

== Named animals ==
- Nils Olav, a succession of penguins at Edinburgh Zoo, officers in the Norwegian King's Guard

== Septs and clans ==
- McAuliffe (surname)
- Mac Amhlaoibh and Mac Amhalghaidh (Irish septs)
- Clan Macaulay of Lewis
- Clan MacAulay

== See also ==
- Aulay, the Anglicized Scottish form of the name
- Ólafur, the Icelandic form of the name
- Olavi, the Finnish form of the name
- Olavo, the Portuguese form of the name
- Ole and Oluf, the Danish forms of the name
- Ola and Olov, the Swedish forms of the name
