= Olave (disambiguation) =

Olave is an alternate form of the Scandinavian name Olaf. It may also refer to:

== People ==
=== Given name ===
- Olave Baden-Powell (1889–1977), first Chief Guide for Britain
- Olave Sinclair (died 1573), an official on Shetland

=== Surname ===
- Anastásia Olave (born 1989), Uruguayan indoor and field hockey player
- Chris Olave (born 2000), American professional football wide receiver
- Gonzalo Olave (1983-2009), Chilean actor
- Isidora Olave (born 2002), Chilean footballer
- Jámison Olave (born 1981), Colombian footballer
- Juan Carlos Olave (born 1976), Argentine footballer
- Julián Olave (1884–1932), Spanish sports leader
- Rosa María Teresa Adriasola Olave (born 1951), Chilean poet, essayist, and literary critic

== Entertainment ==
- Olave (film), 2005 Indian Kannada-language romantic drama film
- Olave Mandara, 2011 Indian Kannada road movie written and directed by Jayatheertha
- Olave Jeevana Lekkachaara, 2009 Indian Kannada-language film

== See also ==
- Olaf (disambiguation)
