= Olle Ericsson =

Olle Ericsson or Eriksson may refer to:

- Olle Ericsson (sport shooter) (1890–1950), Swedish sport shooter
- Olle Eriksson (footballer, born 1918) (1918–2006), Swedish football coach
- Olle Eriksson (footballer, born 1928) (born 1928), Swedish football player and manager
- Olle Eriksson (politician) (1925–1983), Swedish politician
