= St. Olave's Church =

St. Olave's Church or St. Olav's Church, or variants thereof, refers to churches dedicated to Olaf II of Norway, and may refer to:

== England ==
- St Olav's Norwegian Seamen's Church, London, the English name for Sjømannskirken, London
- St Olave's Church, Chester, Cheshire
- St Olave's Church, Exeter, Devon
- St Olave's Church, Gatcombe, Isle of Wight
- St Olave's Church, Hart Street, London
- St Olave's Church, Old Jewry, London
- St Olave's Church, Silver Street, London
- St Olave's Church, Southwark, London
- St Olave's Church, York, Yorkshire
- St Nicholas Olave, London

== India ==
- St. Olav's Church, Serampore

== Norway ==
- St. Olav's Church of Avaldsnes, the formal name for Avaldsnes Church
- St. Olav's Church (ruin) in Bamble, Telemark
- St. Olav's Church, Bergen, incorporated into the current Bergen Cathedral
- Eidsberg Church
- St. Olav's Cathedral, Oslo (Norwegian: Sankt Olav domkirke)
- Holy Olav Chapel, Stiklestad
- St. Olav's Cathedral, Trondheim (Norwegian: St. Olav domkirke)

== See also ==
- St. Olaf's Church
