= St. Olaf's Church =

St. Olaf's Church, or variants thereof, refers to churches dedicated to Olaf II of Norway, and may refer to:

== Denmark ==
- St. Olaf's Church, Helsingør, (Danish: Sankt Olai Kirke)
- Sankt Ols Kirke, Bornholm

=== Faroe Islands ===
- Saint Olav's Church, Kirkjubøur

== Estonia ==
- St. Olaf's Church, Tallinn (Estonian: Oleviste kirik)
- St. Olaf's Church, Nõva (Estonian: Püha Olevi kirik)
- St. Olaf's Church, Vormsi (Estonian: Olavi kirik)
- St. Olaf's Church ruins, Väike-Pakri (Estonian: Püha Olavi kirik)
- St. Olaf's Chapel ruins in Suur-Pakri (Estonian: Olavi kabel)

== Finland ==
- St. Olaf's Church, Jomala, Åland Islands (Finnish: Pyhän Olavin kirkko)
- St. Olaf's Church, Jyväskylä (Finnish: Pyhän Olavin kirkko)
- St. Olaf's Church, Tyrvää, Sastamala (Finnish: Pyhän Olavin kirkko)
- St. Olaf's Church, Ulvila (Finnish: Olavin kirkko)

== Norway ==
- St. Olaf's Church, Balestrand

== Russia ==
- Saint Olaf's Church in Novgorod

== United Kingdom ==
- St Olaf's Church, Poughill, Bude, Cornwall
- St Olaf's Church, Wasdale, Cumbria
- St Olaf's Church (Balliasta), Unst, Shetland
- St Olaf's Church (Cruden), Cruden, Scotland
- St Olaf's Church (Lunda Wick), Unst, Shetland
- St Olaf's Church (Voe), Shetland Mainland

== United States ==
- St. Olaf Kirke, a historical Lutheran church located near Cranfills Gap, Texas

== See also ==
- St. Olave's Church
