= Olavo =

Olavo is a given name, the Spanish and Portuguese form of Olaf, and may refer to:

- Olavo Bilac (1865–1918), Brazilian poet of the Parnassian school
- Olavo Setúbal (1923–2008), Brazilian industrialist, banker and politician
- Olavo Rodrigues Barbosa (1923–2010), Brazilian football (soccer) player
- Olavo Yépez (1937–2021), Ecuadorian chess master
- Olavo de Carvalho (1947–2022), Brazilian journalist and writer
- Olavo Abrantes (1988), Portuguese Production Designer
