= Óláfr Leggsson =

Icelandic skald

Óláfr Leggsson (fl. 1231–1263) was a 13th-century Icelandic skald. He is usually referred to as Olafr Svartaskald (black skald) to distinguish him from his contemporary, Olafr Thordarson, "hvitaskald" (white skald).

Olafr is believed to have been the son of the Icelandic priest Leggr Torfason. He is mentioned in Sturlunga Saga as being involved with the killing of Snorri Sturluson's only legitimate son, Jon Murti. Very little of Olafr Leggson's poetry survives, but he is credited in Skaldatal as being King Hakon Hakonarson's court poet.
