= Per-Olov =

Per-Olov is a masculine given name borne by:

- Per-Olov Ahrén (1926–2004), Swedish clergyman, bishop of Lund from 1980 to 1992
- Per-Olov Brasar (born 1950), Swedish retired ice hockey forward
- Per-Olov Kindgren (born 1956), Swedish musician, composer, guitarist and music teacher
- Per-Olov Löwdin (1916–2000), Swedish physicist

== See also ==
- Per Olov Enquist (1934–2020), Swedish author, journalist and playwright
- Per Olov Jansson (1920–2019), Finnish photographer
