= Olaf (disambiguation) =

Olaf is a Scandinavian, German, and Dutch given name.

Olaf may also refer to:

- Olaf, Iowa, unincorporated community, US
- European Anti-Fraud Office (OLAF)
- OLAF (Organization to solve the foreigner question), a 2010 Swiss satire
- Tropical Storm Olaf, several storms
- Count Olaf, the fictional primary antagonist in A Series of Unfortunate Events
- Olaf (Frozen), a fictional character from Disney's Frozen franchise
- A variant of the letter Aleph

== See also ==
- St. Olaf (disambiguation)
- Olave (disambiguation)
- Olavi
- Olavo
