= Sven-Olov =

Sven-Olov is a masculine given name. People bearing the name include:

- Sven-Olov Lawesson (1926–1988), Swedish chemist
- Sven-Olov Sjödelius (1933–2018), Swedish sprint canoeist

== See also ==
- Sven Olov Lindholm (1903–1998), Swedish Nazi leader, active in Swedish fascist organizations from the 1920s to the 1950s
