= Ólafur Haukur Símonarson =

Icelandic playwright and author (b. 1947)

Ólafur Haukur Símonarson (born August 24, 1947 in Reykjavík) is an Icelandic playwright and novelist who lives in Reykjavík, Iceland.

He is married to actress Guðlaug María Bjarnadóttir and they have three children. He studied interior design in Copenhagen and literature and theater in Copenhagen and Strasbourg from 1965–1972.

Símonarson mainly writes for the stage. He has also published novels, short story collections, poetry, and children's books. His songs and lyrics for children have been released on records and CDs.

Símonarson has mainly worked as full-time writer since 1974. He was director of the People's Theatre in Reykjavík 1980–1982, Chairman of the Icelandic Dramatists´ Union 1986–1999, Vice-Chairman of I.T.I.s´ (International Theatre Institut) playwrights´ committee 1993–1998. Honorary Member of the I.T.I.s´ Playwrights´ Forum. Símonarson has been on the board of the Icelandic Writers Union and the Society of Composers and Copyright Owners since 1985. He is an honorary member of The Icelandic Playwrights Union.

== Accolades ==
- Nomination for the Nordic Councils Literature Prize, 1975.
- The Reykjavík Educational Councils Prize for children books, 1983.
- Honorary award from the Writer's Fund of Iceland, 1992.
- The DV Theatreprize for the best Play, 1993.
- The Icelandic National Broadcasting Service Writer's Prize, 1993.
- Nomination for the Nordic Playwright's Prize, 1994.
- The Les Boréales du Normandie Literature Prize for the Best Nordic Crime Novel, 1997
- The Sea nominated for the 2002 Sundance/NHK International. 2002
