= Olaf of Sweden =

Olaf of Sweden also "Onela" - Swedish: Olov or Olof - may refer to:

- Onela, mythological Swedish ruler
- Olof (I) of Sweden, Swedish king in 854 (speculative numeral)
- Olof Björnsson, Olof "II", Swedish king (reigned ca. 970–975) (speculative numeral)
- Olof Skötkonung, Swedish king (995–1022)
- Olav IV of Norway (1370–1387), Swedish prince, also King of Denmark and Norway
