= Guðmundur Sigurðsson =

Icelandic weightlifter (born 1946)

Personal information
- Nationality: Icelandic
- Born: 9 June 1946 (age 78)

Sport
- Sport: Weightlifting

Guðmundur Sigurðsson (born 9 June 1946) is an Icelandic weightlifter. He competed at the 1972 Summer Olympics and the 1976 Summer Olympics.
