= St. Doologe's =

Civil parish in County Wexford, Ireland

Coordinates: 52.3359°N 6.4576°W

St. Doologe's (Irish: Paróiste Dúlóg), also St. Doologue's, and formerly St. Tullogue's, or St. Euleck's, is a civil parish in the centre of Wexford town in Ireland.

== Nature ==
St. Doologe's is arguably (Note: The liberty of Christ Church Cathedral, Dublin is treated as a civil parish, with an area of 1.619 acres (0.655 hectares).) the smallest civil parish in Ireland; the first-edition Ordnance Survey measured its area as 3 acres, 3 roods, and 17 perches (1.561 ha); later shoreline reclamation increased this by the 1930s to 4 acres 13 perches (1.652 ha). The parish comprises the plots on both sides of King Street Lower, the entire block northwest to Sinnot Place, and a small area southwest of Main Street—Barrack Street, following the line of the old town walls. It is bordered by St. Mary's parish to the northwest, Wexford Harbour to the northeast, and St Michael's of Feagh parish to the south.

== History ==
St. Doologe's Church was built by Norse settlers in the 11th century, and the parish was one of five within the walled town. St Doologe is a corruption of Saint Olaf, king of Norway from 1015 to 1028. The church was among those destroyed in the 1649 Sack of Wexford during Cromwell's campaign. The five parishes were united for Church of Ireland purposes in 1732, with St. Doologe's an impropriate cure. In 1837, the glebe of the parish measured 1 rood (1,000 m^{2}), occupied by "five small houses". St. Doologe's and the other parishes have remained distinct units for civil administration, though practically obsolete since the 19th century. The 1891 census, the last organised by parish, records a population of 245, living in 39 houses.
