= Óli Þorbjörn Guðbjartsson =

Icelandic politician

Óli Þorbjörn Guðbjartsson (born 27 August 1935) is an Icelandic politician and former minister.
