= Óláfr Þórðarson =

Icelandic skald and scholar

Óláfr Þórðarson (Old Norse: [ˈoːˌlɑːvz̠ ˈθoːrðɑz̠ˌson]; Modern Icelandic: Ólafur Þórðarson [ˈouːˌlaːvʏr ˈθourðarˌsɔːn]; c. 1205/1210 – 1259) was an Icelandic skald and scholar. He is usually called Óláfr hvítaskáld (O.N.: [ˈxwiːtɑˌskɑːld]; M.I.: [ˈkʰviːtaˌskault]; "Olaf the white skald") in contrast to a contemporary skald called Óláfr svartaskáld ("Olaf the black skald"). Óláfr was the paternal nephew of Snorri Sturluson and spent his youth in Snorri's home where he had an important part of his scholarly education. Particular important is his Grammatical Treatise. His father was Þórður Sturluson (c. 1165-April 10, 1237), his mother was Þóra “Yngri” Bjarnadóttir (c. 1165-1224) and he was the brother of Guttormur Thordarson (c. 1200-October 17, 1255), Böðvar Þórðarson (c. 1200-c. 1263), Halla Þórðardóttir (c. 1205-?), Thordur Thordarson (c. 1210-?), Valgerdur Thordardottir (1210-?), Gudrun Thordardottir (1210-?), Sturla Thordarson (July 29, 1214-July 30, 1284) and Ogmundur Thordurson (born btwn.1175-1235).

After his father Þórður Sturluson died on April 10, 1237, he travelled to Norway, where he stayed with king Haakon IV of Norway and Jarl Skule, before he went to Denmark and its king Valdemar II of Denmark. He probably also visited king Eric XI of Sweden. In 1240, he served as king Haakon's housecarl in the Battle of Oslo.

Back in Iceland, he was the island's lawspeaker from 1252 to 1256. He became a famous skald and composed poems about the three Scandinavian kings, which are partially included in the Knýtlinga saga, which he probably made from material he collected in Denmark. He died in 1259, aged around 48-54.

== External References ==
All The King's Runes

Olafr Thordarson: a 13th century Icelandic grammarian's account of runic writing
