= Olle Eriksson (footballer, born 1928) =

Swedish former footballer and manager

Personal information
- Full name: Hilding Olof Eriksson
- Date of birth: 25 October 1928 (age 98)

Youth career
- Halmstads BK

Senior career*
Years	Team	Apps	(Gls)
1954–1959	Halmstads BK		
1961–1963	Markaryds IF		
1964–1965	Halmstads BK		
1966–1967	Markaryds IF		
1968–1969	Morups IF		

Managerial career
- 1961–1963: Markaryds IF
- 1964–1965: Halmstads BK
- 1966–1967: Markaryds IF
- 1968–1969: Morups IF
- 1970–1972: Varbergs BoIS
- 1973–1975: Varbergs GIF
- 1978–1981: BK Astrio
- 1984–1986: Vapnö IF
- * Club domestic league appearances and goals

Olle Eriksson (born 25 October 1928) is a Swedish former footballer and manager. Eriksson made his debut in Allsvenskan in the 1954–55 season and helped his Halmstads BK finish second. Later in 1960s he became player-manager before joining Varbergs BoIS as head coach.
