= Nils Backstrom =

American cross-country skier (1901–1978)

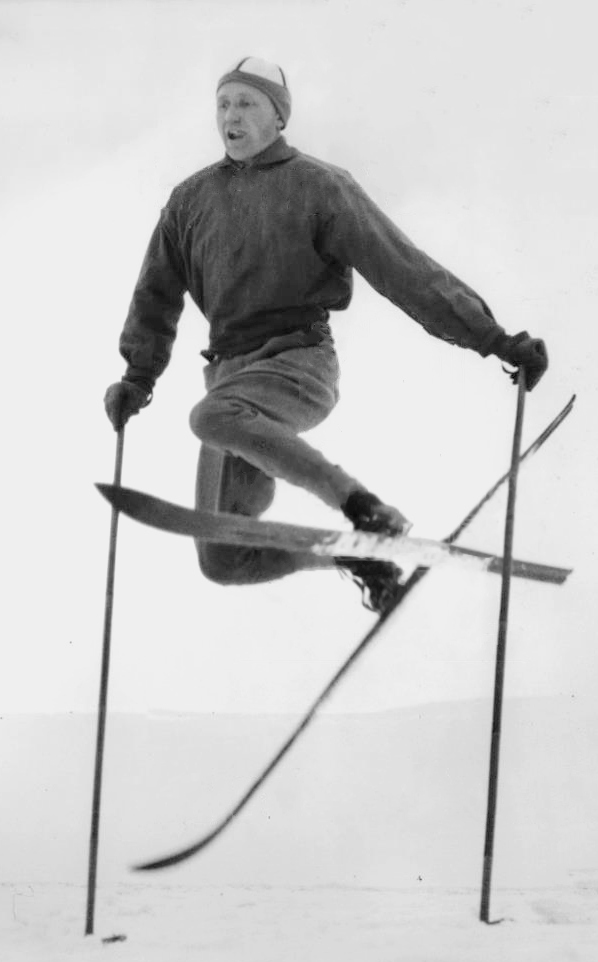
- Backstrom in 1935

Personal information
- Born: June 13, 1901 Ludvika, Sweden
- Died: June 18, 1978 (aged 77) Cleveland, Ohio, U.S.

Sport
- Sport: Cross-country skiing
- Club: Norfolk Winter Sports Club

Nils Backstrom (June 13, 1901 – June 18, 1978) was an American cross-country skier. Born in Sweden, he immigrated to the United States in 1928. He competed in the 50 km event at the 1932 and 1936 Winter Olympics and placed 19th and 33rd, respectively.
