= Ólafur Jónsson =

Icelandic handball player (born 1949)

Personal information
- Full name: Ólafur Hlöðver Jónsson
- Nationality: Icelandic
- Born: 7 December 1949 (age 76) Reykjavík, Iceland
- Height: 191 cm (75 in)

Sport
- Sport: Handball
- Position: Playmaker
- Current club: Retired

Youth career
- Years: Team
- 1965-1968: Valur Reykjavík

Senior clubs
- Years: Team
- 1968-1975: Valur Reykjavík
- 1975-1979: TSV Grün-Weiß Dankersen (Germany)
- 1979-1983: Þróttur Reykjavík (as player-coach)
- 1984-1985: Valur Reykjavík
National team
Years	Team	Apps	(Gls)
1968-1985	Iceland	138	(301)

Ólafur Jónsson (born 7 December 1949) is an Icelandic former handball player who competed in the 1972 Summer Olympics.

== Playing career ==
Jónsson began playing handball at the age of 15 years at Valur Handball. He debuted for the national team at the age of 18.

He debuted for the Icelandic national team on 16 November 1968 against West Germany.

With Valur he won the Icelandic Championship twice, in 1971 and 1973 and the Icelandic cup in 1974. In 1975 he joined TSV Grün-Weiß Dankersen in the German Bundesliga. In his first season he came second in the Bundesliga, and in 1977 he won it. He also won the DHB-Pokal in 1976 and 1979. He also reached the final of the EHF Cup Winners' Cup in 1976, but lost the final 24:26 to BM Granollers.

In 1979 he returned to Iceland to join 2nd league team Þróttur Reykjavík as player-coach. In his first season the team were promoted, and in his second season he finished 2nd in the Icelandic league and won the Icelandic cup. He retired in 1983, but came out of retirement in 1984 to join Valur Reykjavík.

== Titles ==
- Icelandic Championship:
  - Winner: 1973
  - Second place: 1971, 1974, 1975, 1980
- Icelandic Cup:
  - Winner: 1974, 1981
- German Championship:
  - Winner: 1977
  - Second place: 1976
- German Cup:
  - Winner: 1976, 1979
- EHF Cup Winners' Cup:
  - Second place: 1976
