= Ólafur Benediktsson =

Icelandic handball player (born 1952)

Personal information
- Nationality: Icelandic
- Born: 3 August 1952 (age 74) Reykjavík, Iceland
- Height: 1.79 m (5 ft 10 in)

Sport
- Sport: Handball
- Position: Goalkeeper
National team
Years	Team	Apps	(Gls)
–	Iceland	96	(0)

Ólafur Benediktsson (born 3 August 1952) is an Icelandic former handball player who competed in the 1972 Summer Olympics.
