= Holy Olav Chapel =

- Hellige Olav kapell
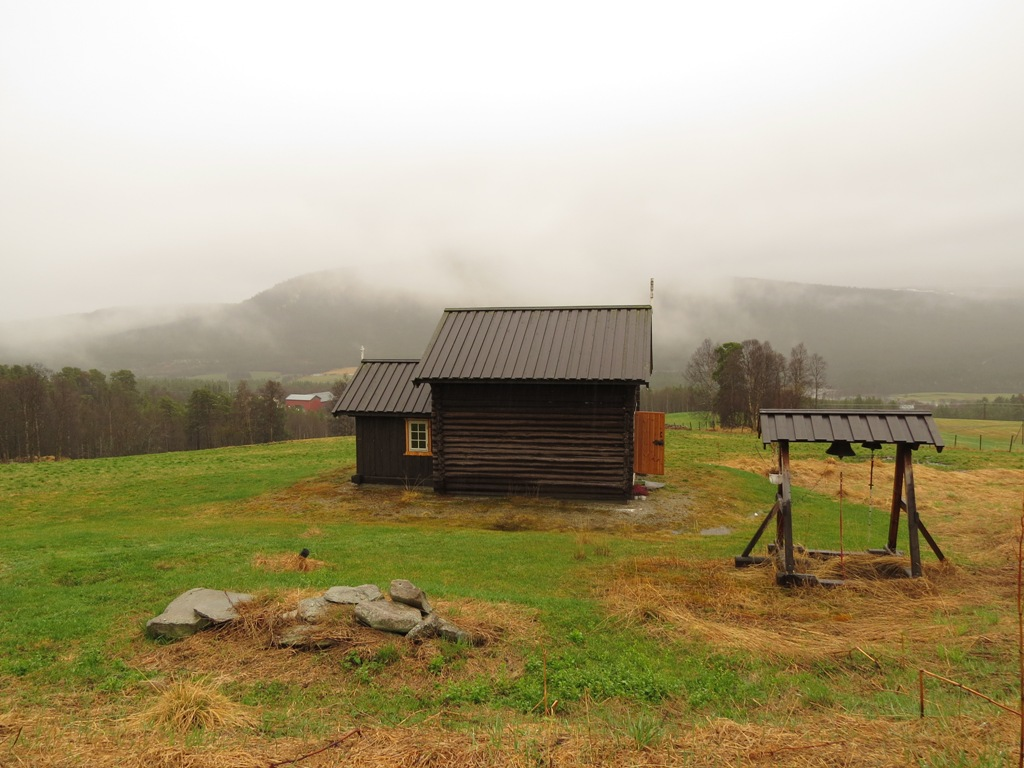
- Holy Olav Chapel
- Holy Olav Chapel
- 63°47′52″N 11°33′44″E
- Location: Verdal Municipality
- Country: Norway
- Language: Norwegian
- Denomination: Russian Orthodox

Holy Olav Chapel (Norwegian: Hellige Olav kapell) is a chapel of the Russian Orthodox Church situated at Stiklestad in Verdal Municipality, Norway. It is situated at the historical memorial complex of Stiklestad and inaugurated in honor of Olav II, also known as Saint Olav and Holy Olav, who fell in the Battle of Stiklestad at the site in 1030. The log building belongs to the Holy Olga Russian Orthodox Congregation in Oslo.

The structure originated as an 18th-century granary on a farm in Folldal Municipality. It was rebuilt by the owner Jonah Føien in 2003 and inaugurated as a chapel. In this process it received an extension for the altar. The chapel was relocated to Stiklestad in 2013. It was reinaugurated on 16 October 2014. The site also features two other churches, Stiklestad Church of the Lutheran Church of Norway, and the Catholic St. Olav's Chapel.
