= Oluf of Denmark =

Olaf of Denmark – Danish: Oluf - may refer to:

- Olaf I of Denmark
- Olaf II of Denmark
