= Saint Olaf's Church in Novgorod =

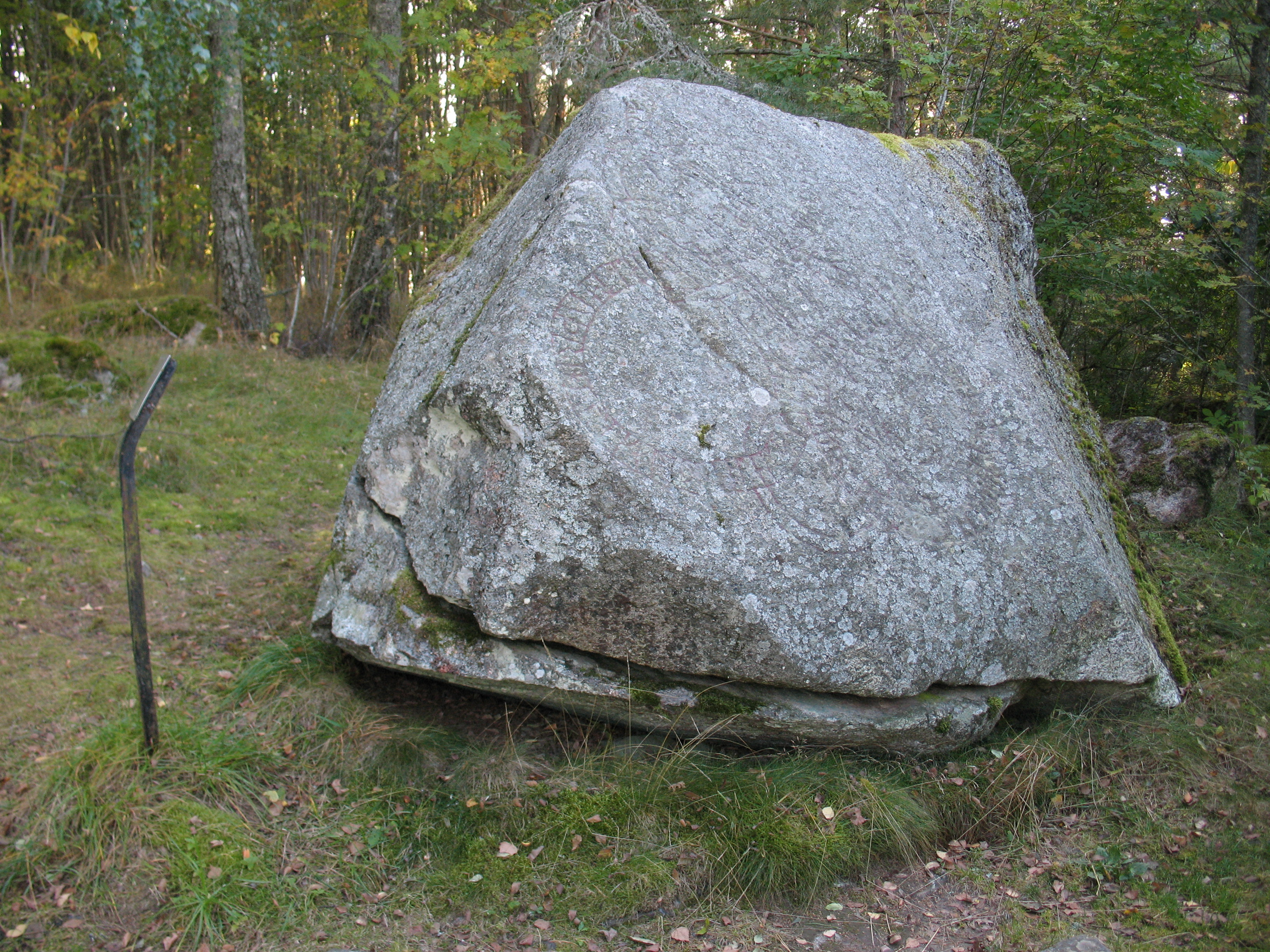
The Sjusta Runestone commemorates a Varangian who died in Saint Olaf's church in Novgorod.

Saint Olaf's Church in Novgorod was a church for Varangians which existed from the 11th century until the 14th century in the Russian city of Novgorod.

The church was located in the permanent Varangian centre of trade in Novgorod's trading area (torgovaja storona), which was called got'skij dvor ("Gothic court") according to an early tradition. The functions of the church was not merely to provide a place of worship, but it also served as a treasury and as a warehouse, as was generally the case for churches in Varangian and Hanseatic trading colonies. Like other medieval churches it was probably also a defensive structure to which may testify the Sjusta Runestone in Uppland, Sweden, which was raised after a man named Spjallboði who died in the church. Omeljan Pritsak, on the other hand, suggests that Spjallboði may have died in a fire c. 1070–1080, one of several that ravaged the church.

Saint Olaf began to be venerated as a saint almost directly after his death in 1030, and in 1050, the cult had arrived in England. Saint Olaf had special connections with the city of Novgorod since its Grand Prince Yaroslav I the Wise was not only the brother-in-law of Olaf, but he also fostered Olaf's son Magnus I of Norway at his court.

In addition to appearing on the Sjusta Runestone, Saint Olaf's church is also mentioned in two written sources. The Acta Sancti Olavi regis et martyris was written by Trondheim's archbishop Eysteinn Erlendsson in the third quarter of the 12th century. It informs that a Latin priest named Stephan served in Saint Olaf's church in Novgorod (Holmegarder). There is also a draft of a German treaty with Novgorod which dates to c. 1230, and it talks of Curia gotensium cum ecclesia et cimiterium Sancti Olaui, which means "the Gothic court (i.e. Got'skij dvor) with Saint Olaf's church and cemetery".

The Novgorod First Chronicle only talks of the church of the Varangians (cerky ... variaz'skaja na T"rgovišči). The chronicle mentions the church four times because of fires. In 1152, the church burnt down together with eight other churches, in 1181, it burnt down because of lightning. In 1217, the church is mentioned as Varjaz'skaja božnica, the "Varangian shrine" and it reports that considerable amounts of merchandise belonging to the Varangians were completely lost in a fire. The last mention is from 1311, when it burnt down together with seven other churches.

The Acta Sancti Olavi talks of a miracle worked by Saint Olaf during a fire in Novgorod, and Pritsak suggests that it was the fire of 1152.

== Sources ==
- Jansson, Sven B. (1980). Runstenar. STF, Stockholm. ISBN 91-7156-015-7
- Pritsak, Omeljan. (1981). The origin of Rus'. Cambridge, Mass.: Distributed by Harvard University Press for the Harvard Ukrainian Research Institute. ISBN 0-674-64465-4
