= Sigurður Einarsson (handballer) =

Icelandic handball player (born 1943)

Personal information
- Nationality: Icelandic
- Born: 7 April 1943 (age 83)
- Height: 178 cm (70 in)

Sport
- Sport: Handball
National team
Years	Team	Apps	(Gls)
–	Iceland	29	(31)

Sigurður Einarsson (born 7 April 1943) is an Icelandic former handball player who competed in the 1972 Summer Olympics. On club level he played for Fram, Reykjavík.
