= Ólavur =

Ólavur may refer to:

- Ólavur Jakobsen, classical guitarist, born 1964 in Tórshavn, Faroe Islands
- Ólavur Riddararós, a single by the Faroese folk / Viking metal band Týr, released in 2002 by Tutl
- Olavur Tryggvason, (960s–1000), King Olaf I of Norway from 995 to 1000
