= St Olave's Church, Exeter =

Church in Exeter, Devon

Church of St Olave
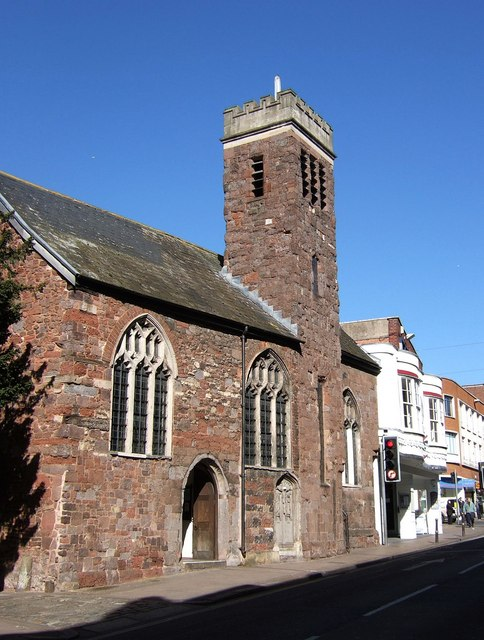
- St Olave's Church, Exeter

- Location within Devon
- 50.721697°N 3.533884°W
- OS grid reference: SX 91818 92466
- Location: Fore Street, Exeter
- Country: England
- Denomination: Church of England

History
- Founder: Lady Gytha
- Dedication: Saint Olaf

Administration
- Province: Canterbury
- Diocese: Exeter

St Olave's Church is a parish church located in Exeter, Devon, England. The church originated as a private chapel, founded by Lady Gytha, wife of Godwin, Earl of Wessex, and mother of King Harold Godwinson. St Olav's is recorded in the Domesday Book in 1086 AD as church property associated with Battle Abbey in Sussex. St Olav's became a parish church in the 13th century. It was rebuilt in the late 14th to 15th centuries. The building was designated a Grade I listed building on 4 January 1950.

== Description ==
St Olave’s Church is situated on Fore Street in Exeter, Devon, England. Originally constructed with squared rubble, the structure has undergone multiple renovations over the years. It was rebuilt in the 14th century as a simple rectangular nave and chancel with the addition of two north aisles, using volcanic stone with white Triassic sandstone quoins. The earliest surviving feature is the long-and-short quoining in late Anglo-Saxon style at the north-west corner of the nave. It is now partly covered by the later north aisle.

The south wall includes a tall 15th-century window, along with earlier features such as a surviving relieving arch from a smaller, possibly 14th-century opening. The window openings suggest the tower once had three storeys and included a spire and four pinnacles. The tower dates to the 13th century with an upper stage added in the early 1700s, constructed with yellow brick and featuring an octagonal turret. Interior features include a late 17th-century pulpit, a mid-18th century communion table, and an early 19th-century gallery and organ. A damaged relief sculpture of the Scourging of Christ before King Herod was likely part of an altar, It is now set into the wall.

== History ==
=== Medieval era ===
Some scholars suggest that the church originated as a private chapel, founded by Lady Gytha—mother of Harold Godwinson—after the death of her husband, Godwin, Earl of Wessex. It was dedicated to St Olav, the Anglicized name of St Olaf, the Norwegian king Olaf Haraldsson. (995–1030). The church is recorded in the Domesday Book (1086) as an ecclesiastical property connected to Battle Abbey in Sussex. Its endowment was historically associated with the powerful Godwin family of Wessex and King Edward the Confessor. A record of these endowments survives in medieval manuscripts from St Nicholas Priory in Exeter. The priory was founded by monks of Battle Abbey after William the Conqueror gifted St Olave’s church to the abbey. The texts include a grant, dated 1057–1065, in which "Gytha, widow of Godwin, earl of Wessex", gave land at Sherford to the church of St Olave, "king and martyr for her soul and Godwin's soul." The grant was witnessed by her sons, Tostig and Gyrth, and Sæwin the priest.

=== Post-Medieval era ===
St Olave's underwent major renovations in the 14th and 15th centuries, including the addition of two north aisles with octagonal piers and large windows. A narrow southern extension, possibly built as a priest's room, was later altered in the 18th century with a wooden stair and gallery. The south porch and south-east vestry were added in 1661. A new doorway was built beside the tower. It is now blocked and contains a World War I memorial. A chancel opening and squint were cut through the tower wall. The tower contains a single bell with a Latin inscription meaning, "By my lively voice I disperse all that is harmful."

The church was made redundant in the 17th century and used as a parish school. From 1635 to 1758, it served as a place of worship for French Huguenot refugees, many of whom are commemorated on memorial floor slabs. At various times, the building also functioned as a military chapel for regiments stationed in Exeter.

=== Modern era ===
Major renovations took place in the early 19th century. The south wall was demolished and rebuilt further south, adjacent to the tower, and the nave and south-west tower were expanded to the west. The tower now stands within the chancel. In 1874, new benches were made from the original box pews, and an iron screen was added in the sanctuary. A stained glass window depicting St Olave as King of Norway was installed in 1875. The screen between the nave and chancel was erected in 1902. In the early 20th century, a triptych of three panels was added behind the altar form the reredos.

A World War I memorial is set into a blocked doorway. Dedicated on 10 January 1917, the small sculpture may have been one of the first Great War memorials erected in England. A wooden memorial cross stands on Calvary steps, inscribed with "Pray for the men of St. Olave’s." The Roll of Honour is displayed in two panels, one for the fallen. The church's timber-framed roof was destroyed in World War II and later rebuilt. In 1971, St Olave’s was incorporated into the Parish of Central Exeter. It is still used regularly for worship by the parish, and by the Romanian Orthodox Church. The Church of St Olav was designated a Grade I listed building on 4 January 1950.

== Gallery ==
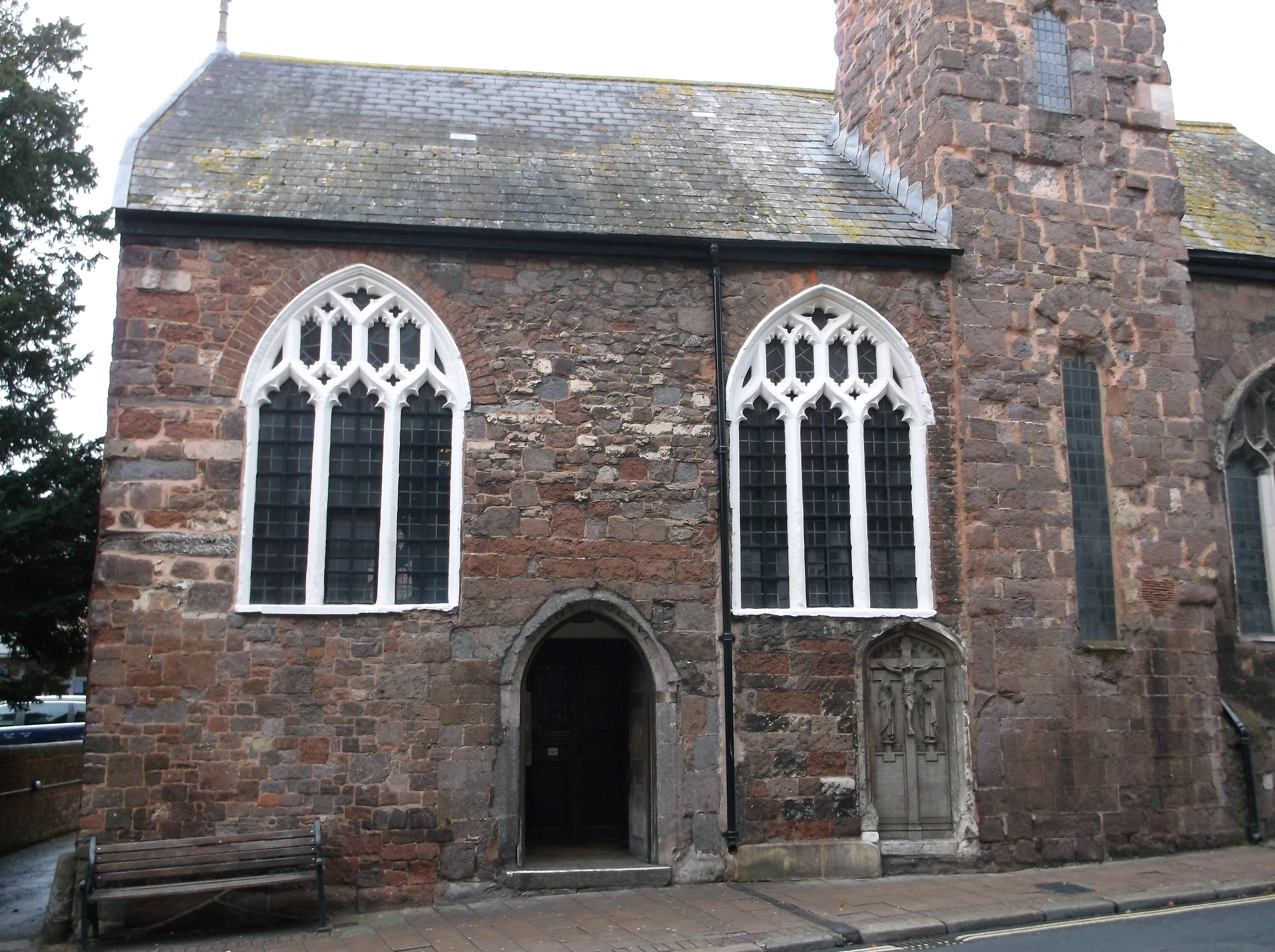
Church exterior

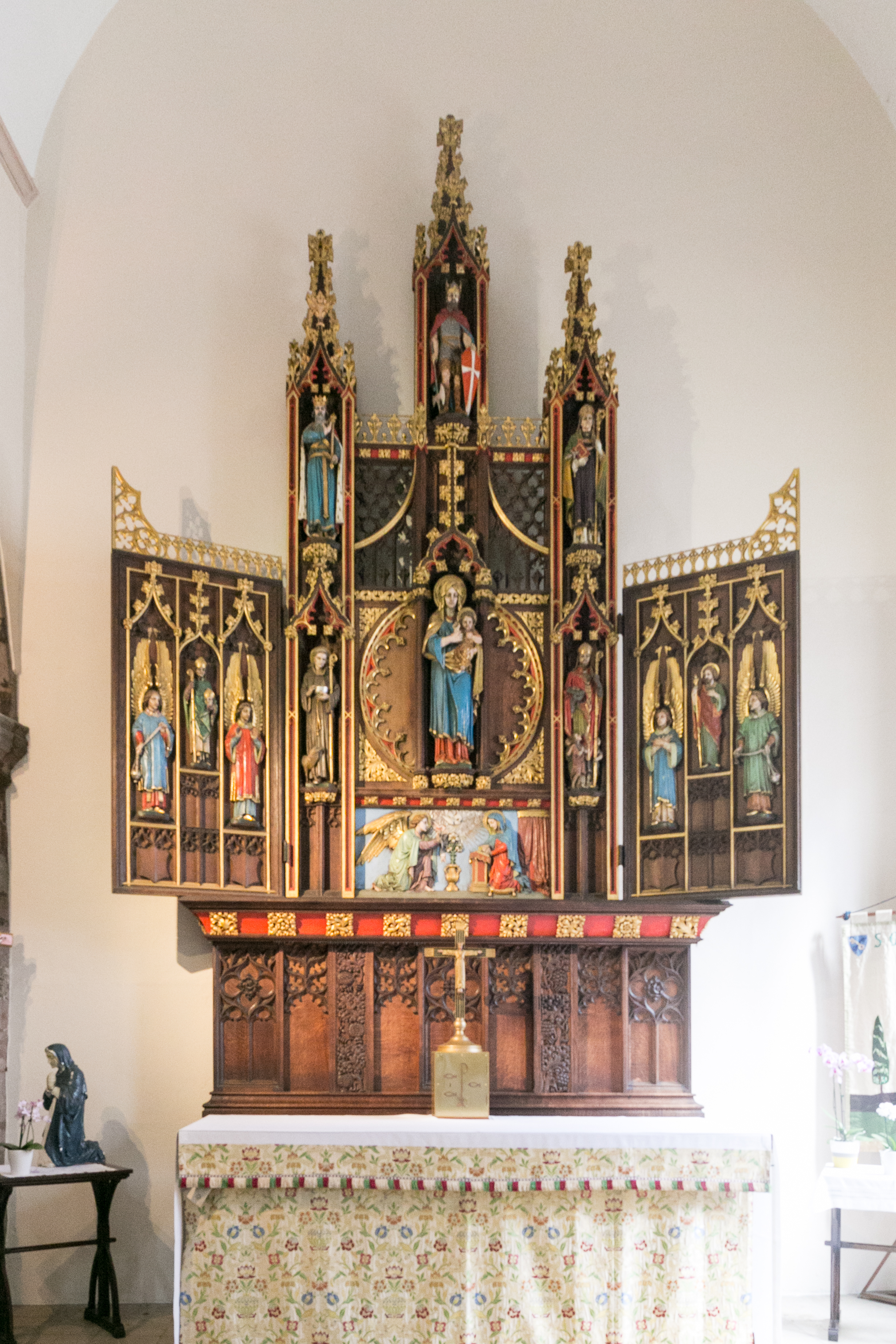
Reredo

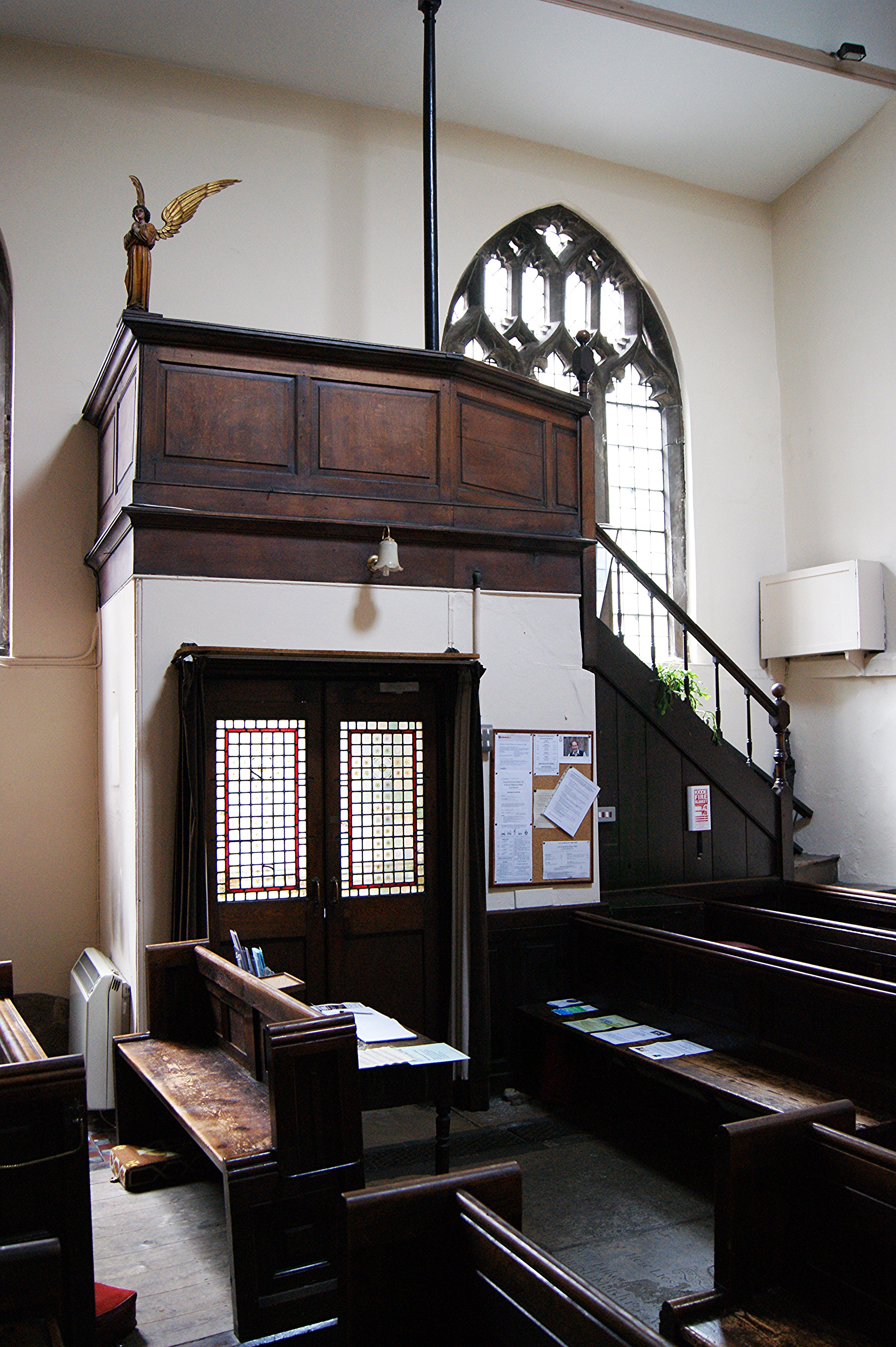
Gallery

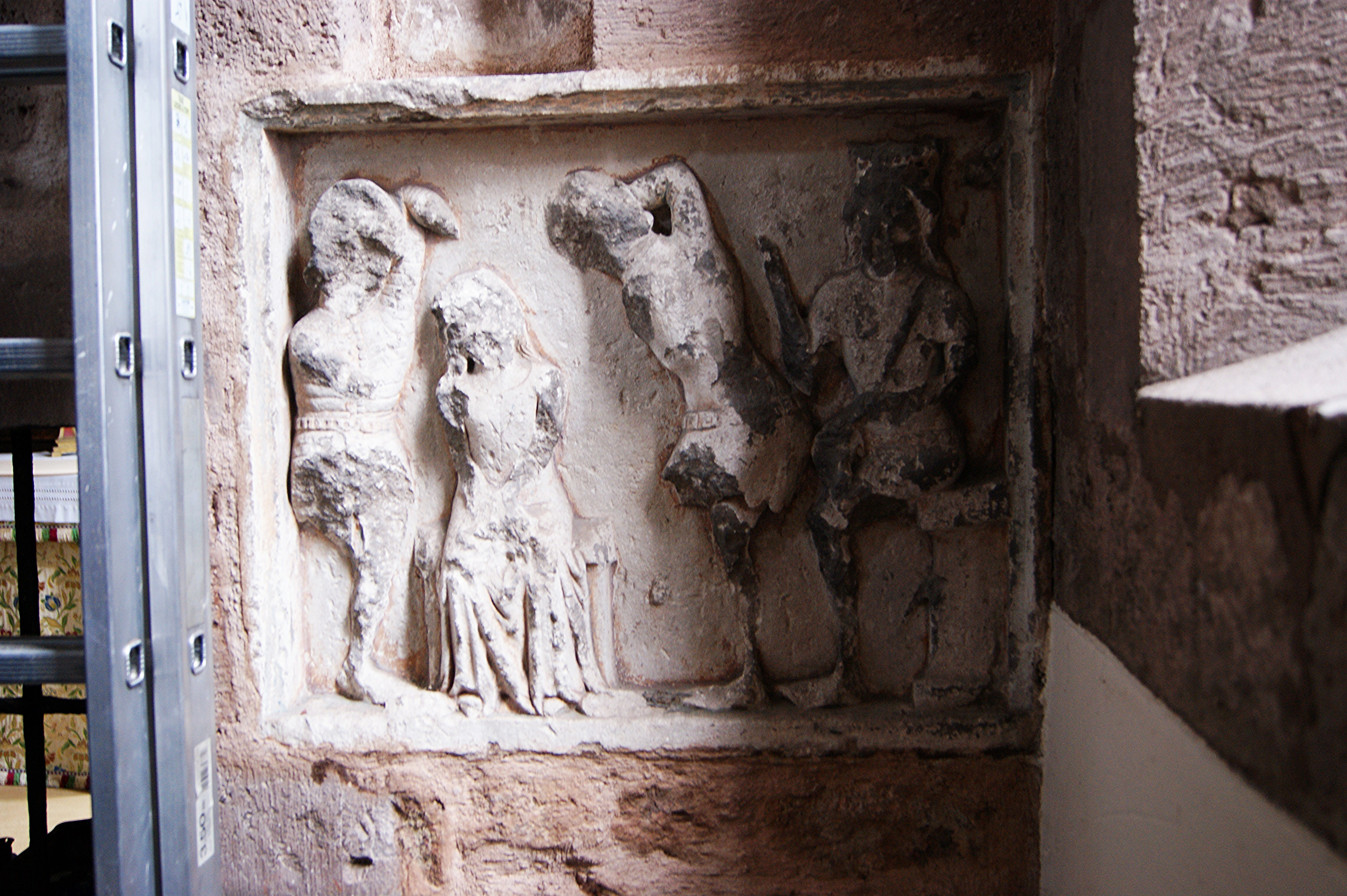
Interior relief sculpture

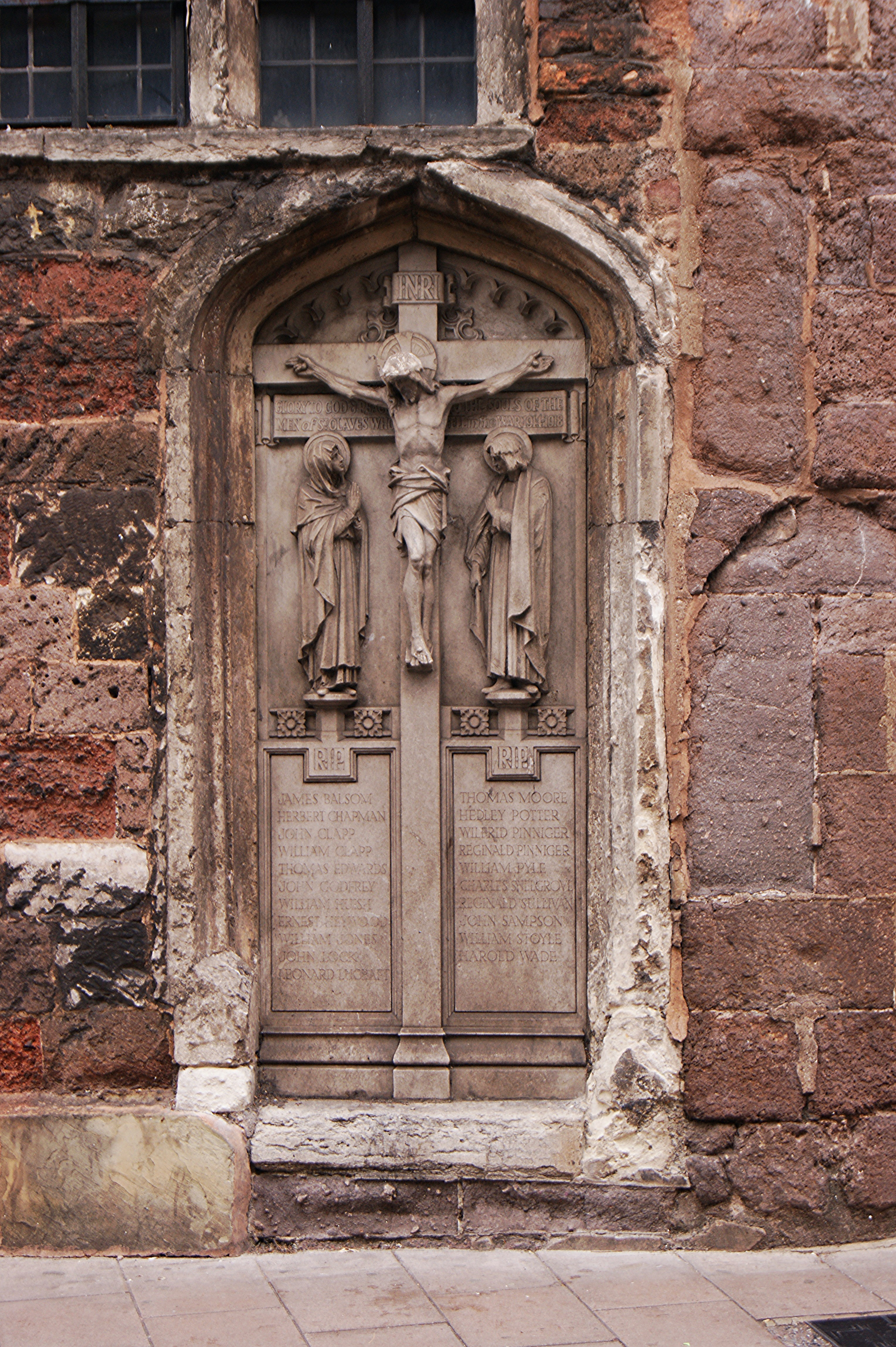
World War I memorial
