= St. Olaf's Church, Tallinn =

Church in Tallinn, Estonia

St. Olaf's church
- Oleviste kirik
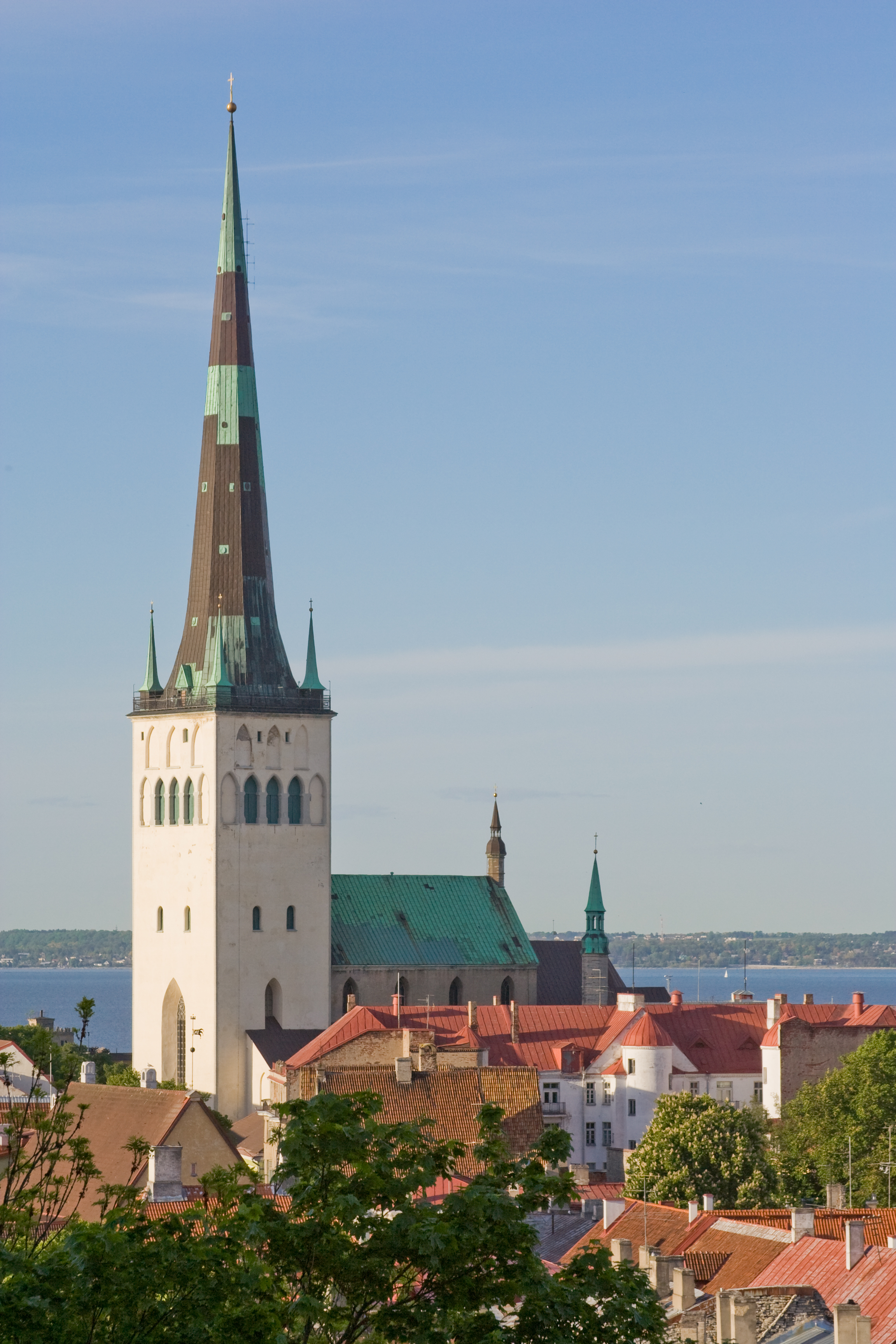
- St. Olaf's church
- 59°26′29.1″N 24°44′52.1″E
- Location: Tallinn
- Country: Estonia
- Denomination: Baptist
- Previous denomination: Lutheran, Catholic

History
- Status: Active
- Founded: 12th century

St. Olaf's, or St. Olav's Church (Estonian: Oleviste kirik; German: Olaikirche), is a Baptist church in Tallinn, Estonia; originally a Roman Catholic Church, after the Reformation it was a Lutheran church. It is the tallest church building in Estonia – 123.7 meters above ground level, with an observation platform in the church tower at a height of 60 meters. It is assumed that a church stood on the same site before the 12th century, built by Scandinavian merchants and named after the canonized Norwegian King Olav II Haraldsson, who is considered a patron saint of seafarers (also known as Saint Olaf, 995–1030).

== History ==
The earliest mention of the church dates back to 1267. At that time, Queen Margaret of Denmark granted the Cistercian convent of St. Michael in Reval (Tallinn) the parish rights to St. Olaf's Church. Little is known about the early years of the Gothic church building. Building records from the 14th and 15th centuries attest to the church's expansion; the tower is mentioned in 1364. St. Olaf's was originally a Catholic church, however, during the 16th century Reformation in Estonia it became part of the local Lutheran tradition and had a large, mostly German-speaking congregation until 1939. As a result of World War II, the church was left without active congregation, and the Soviet occupation regime handed the building over to Baptists in 1950. Since that time, St. Olaf is a Baptist church that continues to conduct services.

From 1944 until 1991, the Estonian branch of Soviet KGB, whose headquarters were located nearby, used St. Olaf's Church's spire as a radio tower and surveillance point.

== Legend ==
A legend surrounds the construction of this building. The citizens of Tallinn wanted to build the tallest church in the world, but since there was a curse that ensured the death of anyone who finished its construction, no one was willing to do the work. Then a stranger appeared and asked for a large amount of money to do it. Since the city could not pay this sum, he proposed the following challenge: If they found out his name, he would forgive their debt. To do so, the Tallinners sent a spy to his house, who heard Olev's name in a song his wife sang. They waited for the stranger to finish the construction, and when he was putting the cross on the tower, they shouted to him from below, "Olev, the cross is crooked!" He got scared and fell to the ground. When he hit the ground, a toad and a snake came out of his mouth, which denoted the demonic possession of this man. This fact is reflected in a mural painting on one of the sides of the church.

== Height ==
A medieval craftsman claimed it was 84 fathoms tall. One source assumed he was referring to Rhineland fathoms, which would've made it 159 metres tall, which would be the tallest building in the world at the time. Although he was probably referring to local fathoms, and in 1590 the total height of the church tower was probably 115.35–125 m. The tower has been hit by lightning around 10 times, and the whole church has burned down three times throughout its known existence. After several reconstructions, its spire now stands 123.8 meters tall.

== Organ ==
The organ was built between 1840 and 1842 by a German organist Friedrich Hermann Lütkemüller and installed by Johann Eberhard Walcker and three other assistants from the Walcker organ building company. From Lütkemüller's autobiography from 1869:

- “During the construction of the two large works for St. Petersburg 1838-1840 and for Reval 1840-1842, my training progressed more and more, so that during Walcker's eight-month absence I was able to be entrusted with the management completely independently. The intonation and tuning of the Reval organ was already my work. I went to Reval with three other assistants alongside Mr. Walcker to set up the organ for the St. Olai Church in Reval.”
- “The organ in the Olai Church and an eight-legged work in the country were installed in four months. I also intoned another organ in Reval, which had been repaired by a local organ builder Tanton and to which we had brought various new registers and who allowed me to carry out the entire tuning because I could do it more confidently and better than he could..."

A renovation took place in 1914. The instrument has 76 registers, 3 manuals and a pedal. The actions are pneumatic.

== See also ==
- List of tallest churches
- List of tallest structures built before the 20th century
- St. Nicholas Church, Tallinn

== Images ==
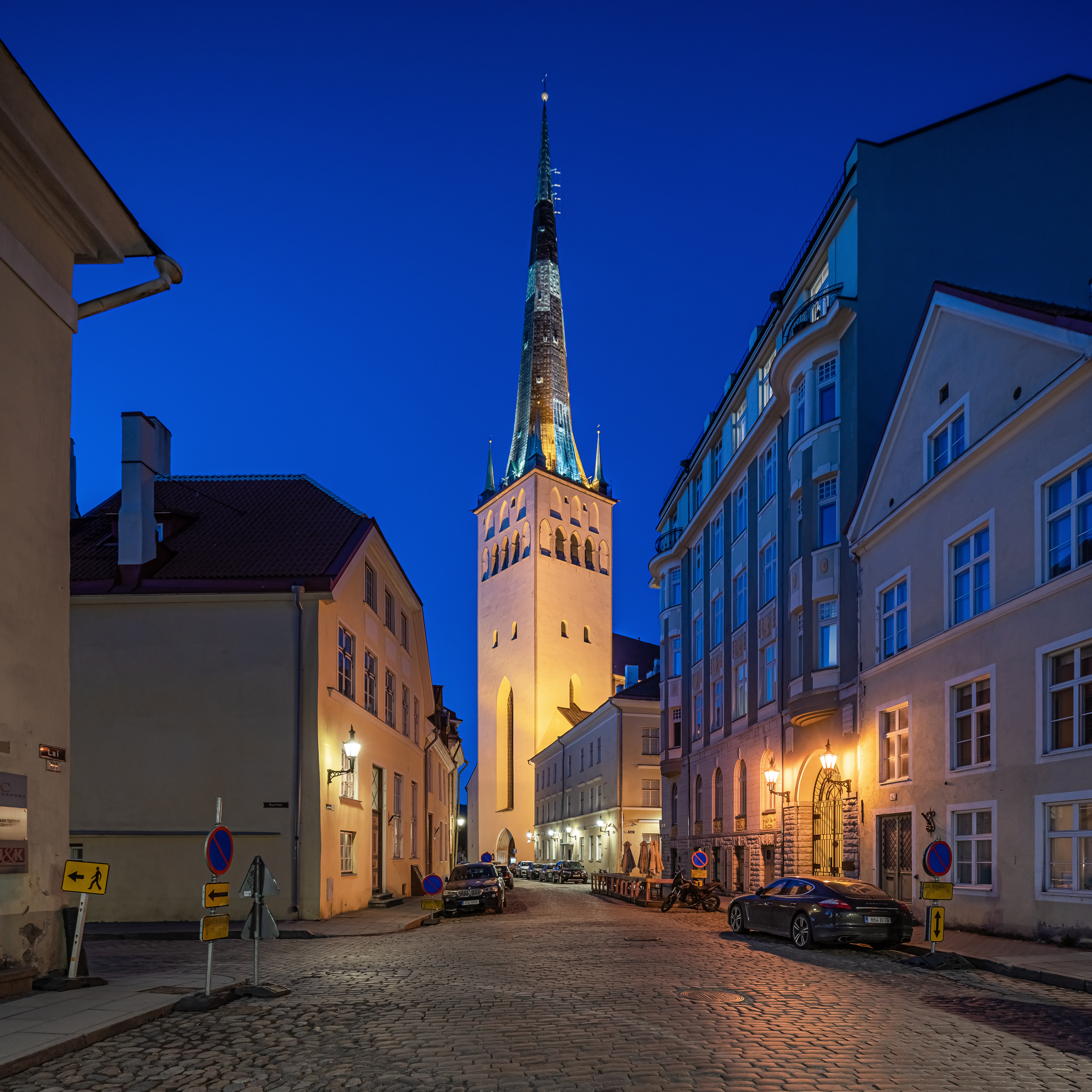
Night view

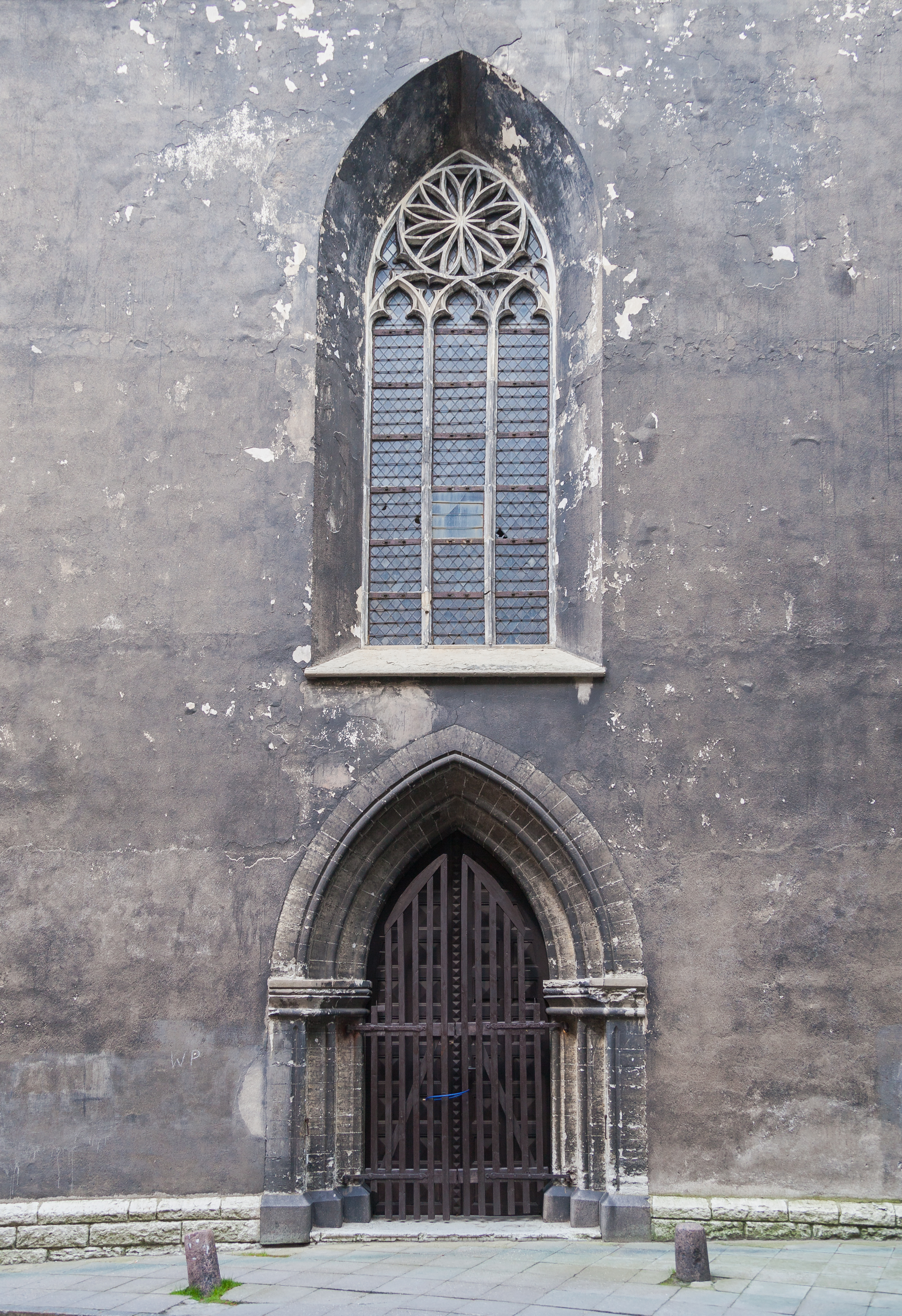
Church portal

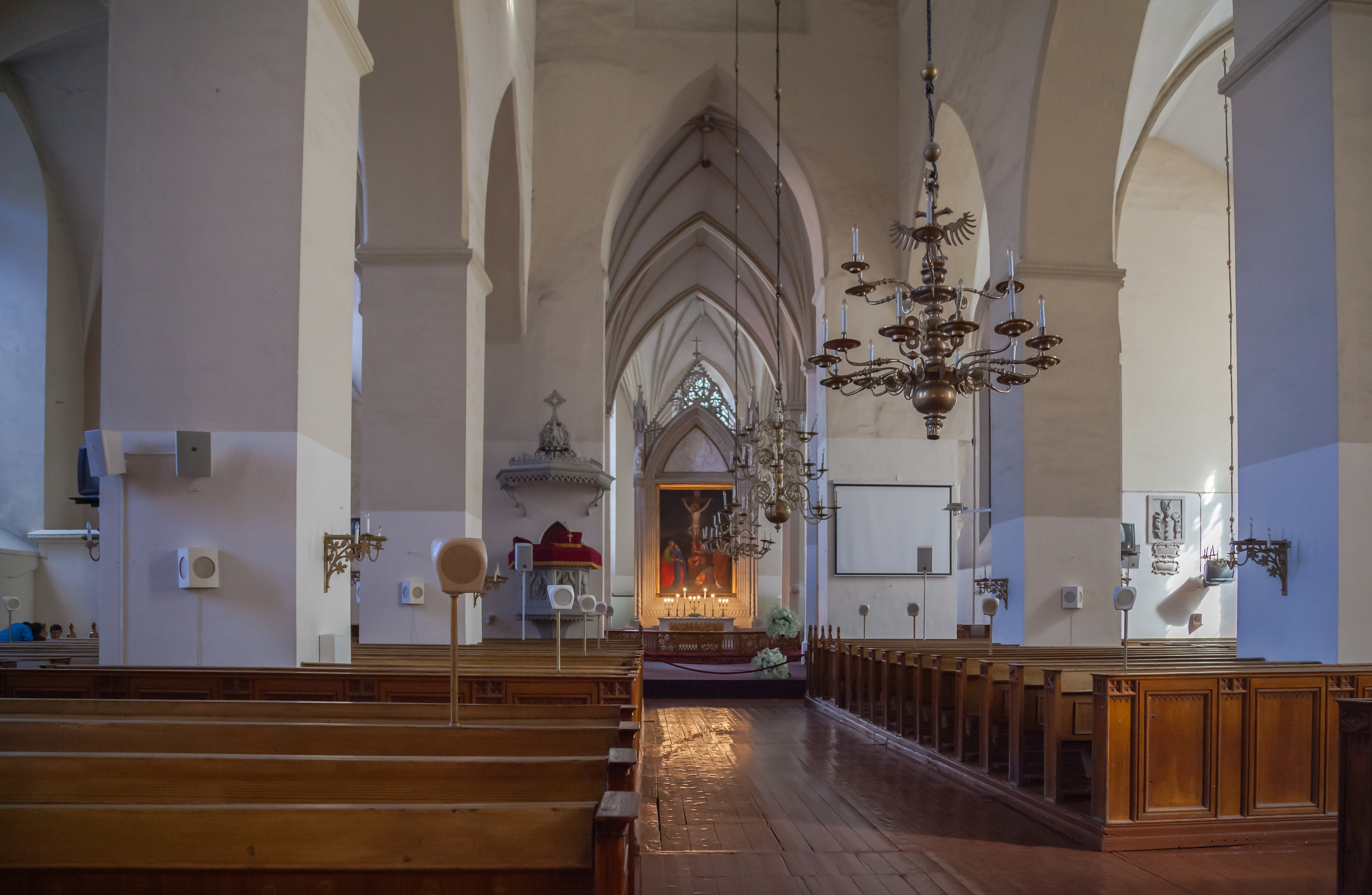
Interior

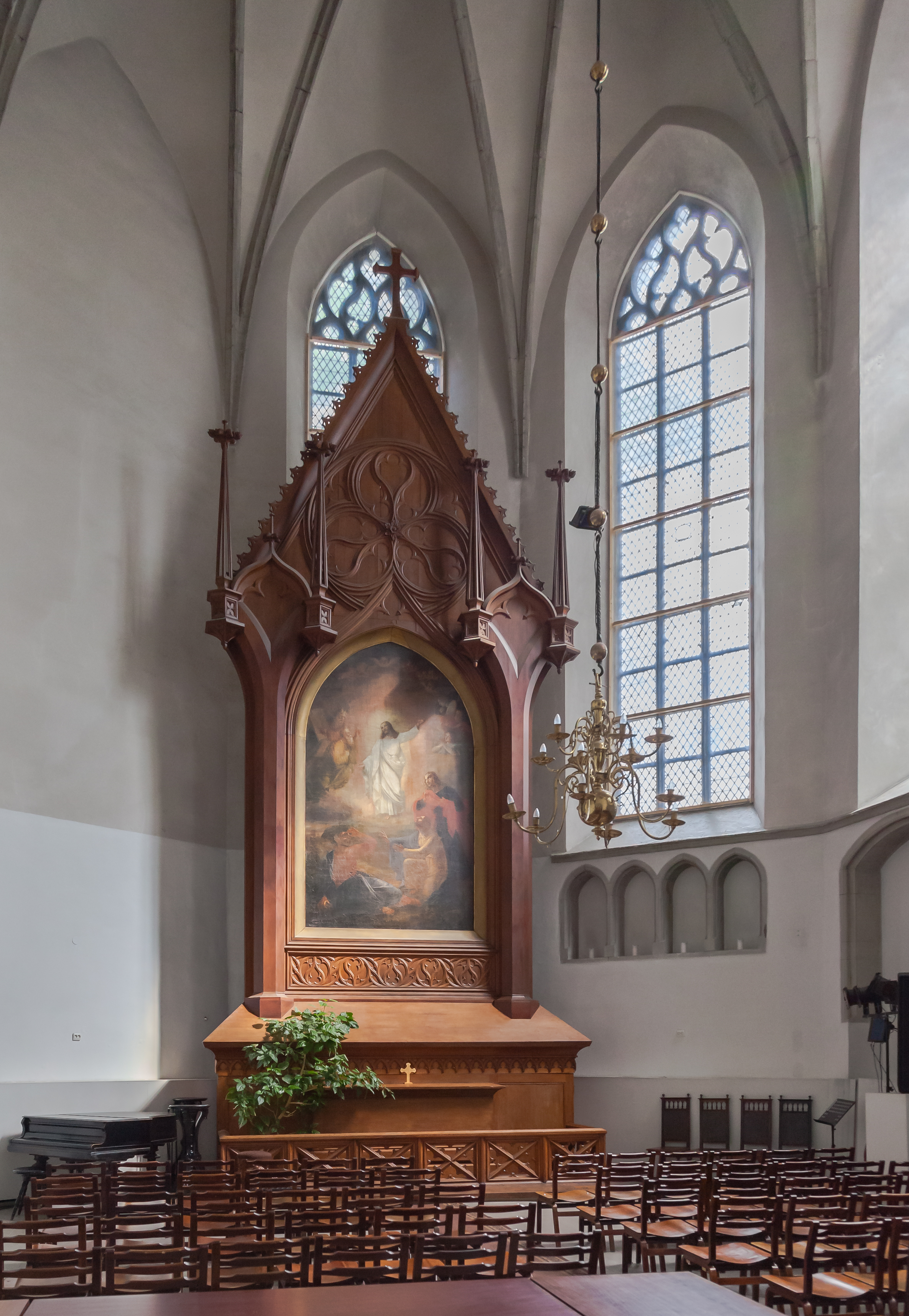
Interior

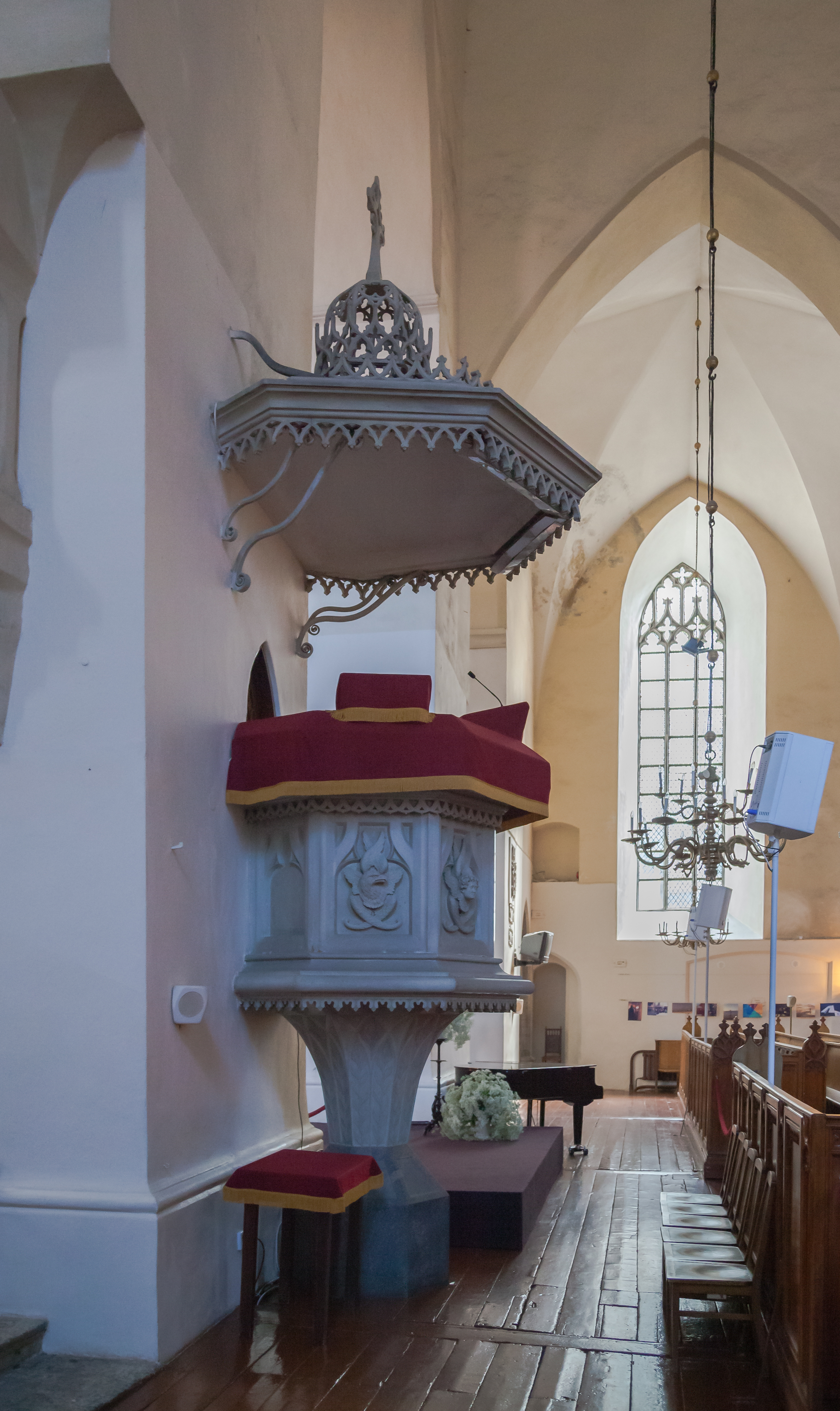
Interior

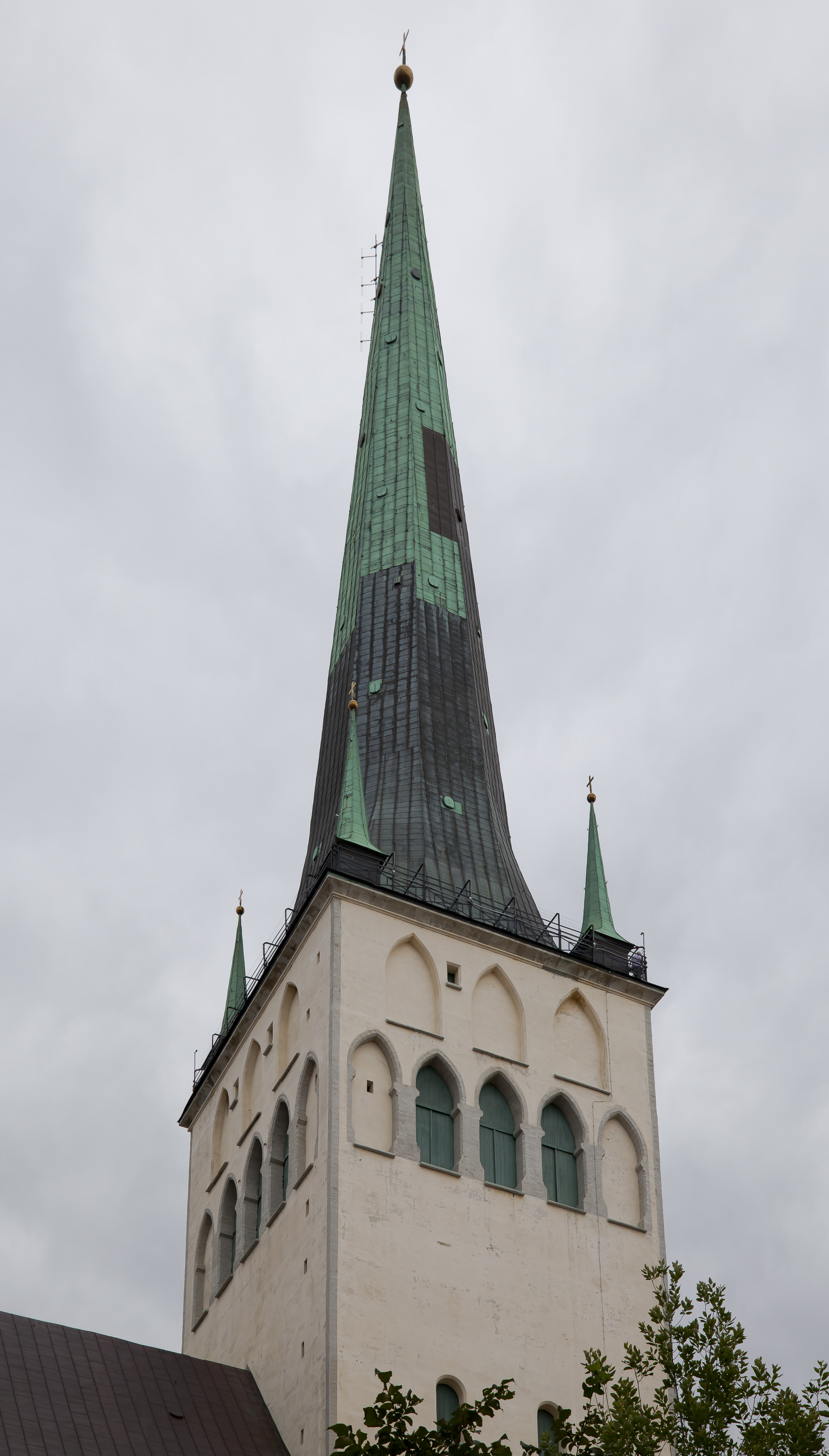
Church tower at day

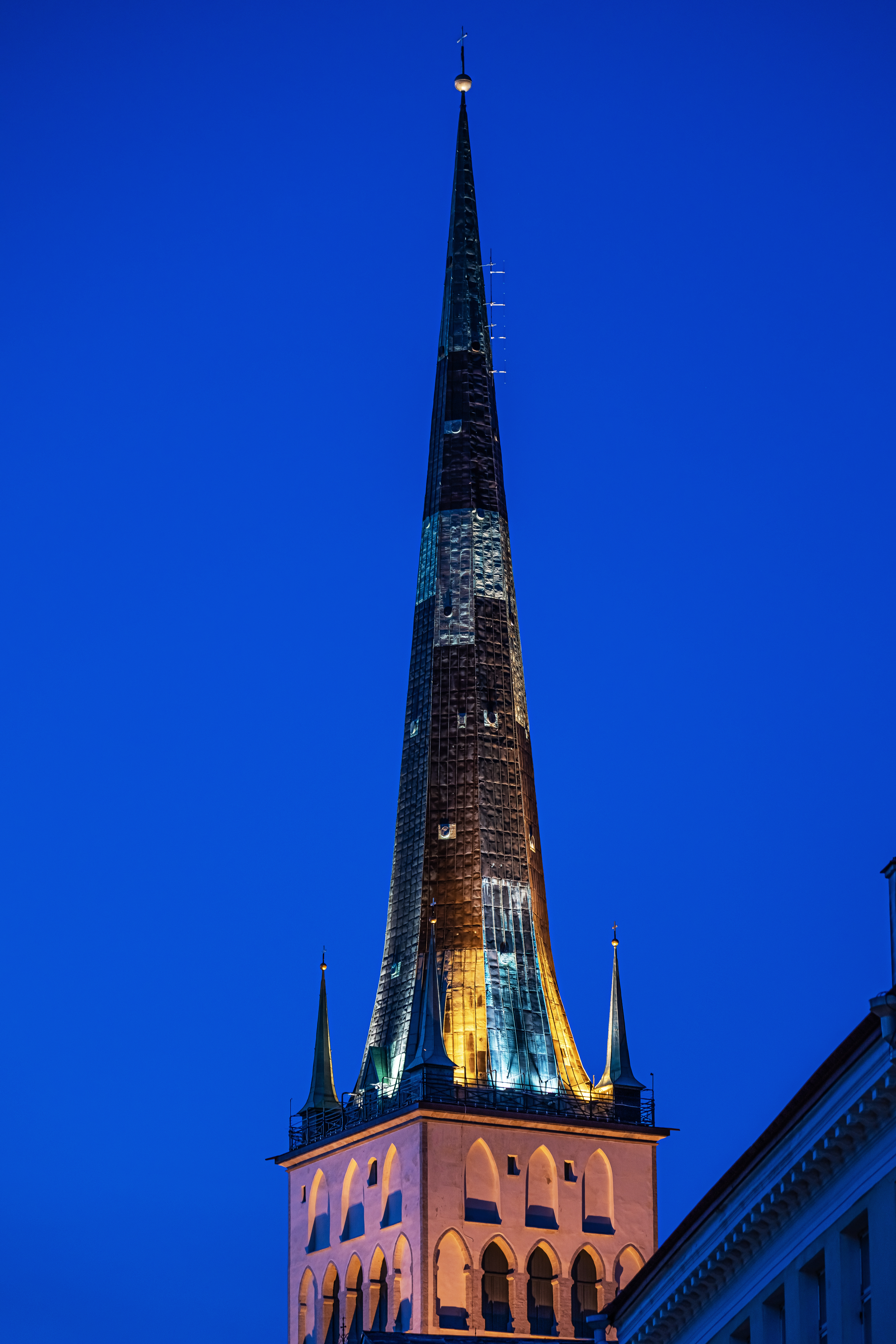
Church tower at night

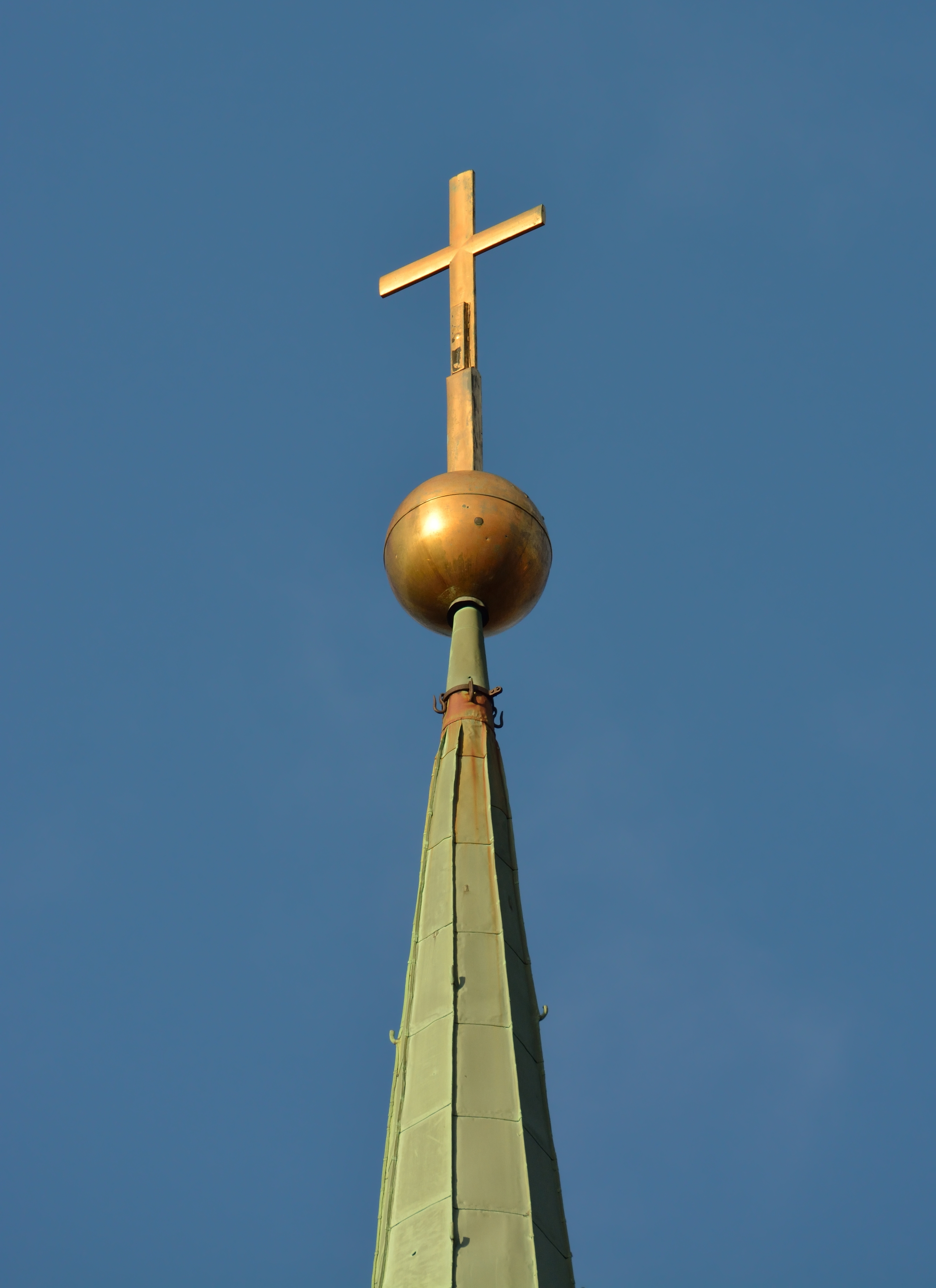
Spire with cross

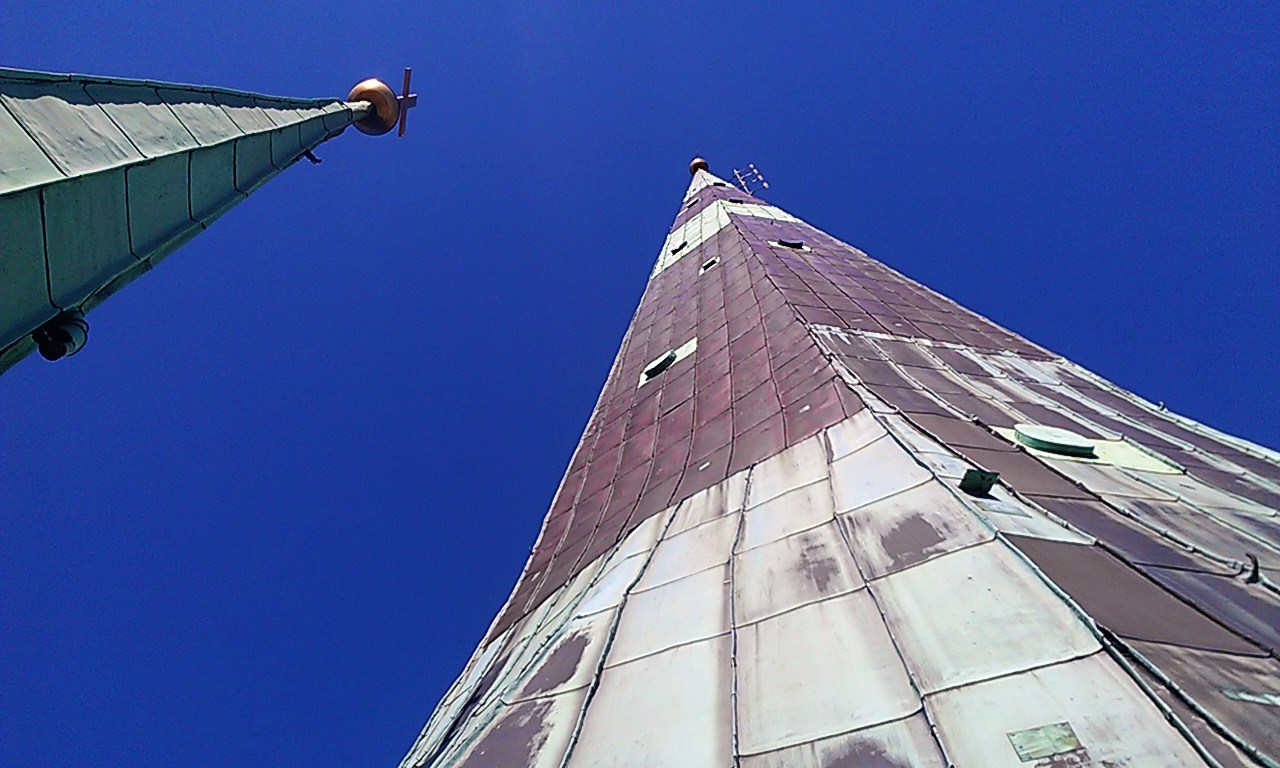
The spires of the church

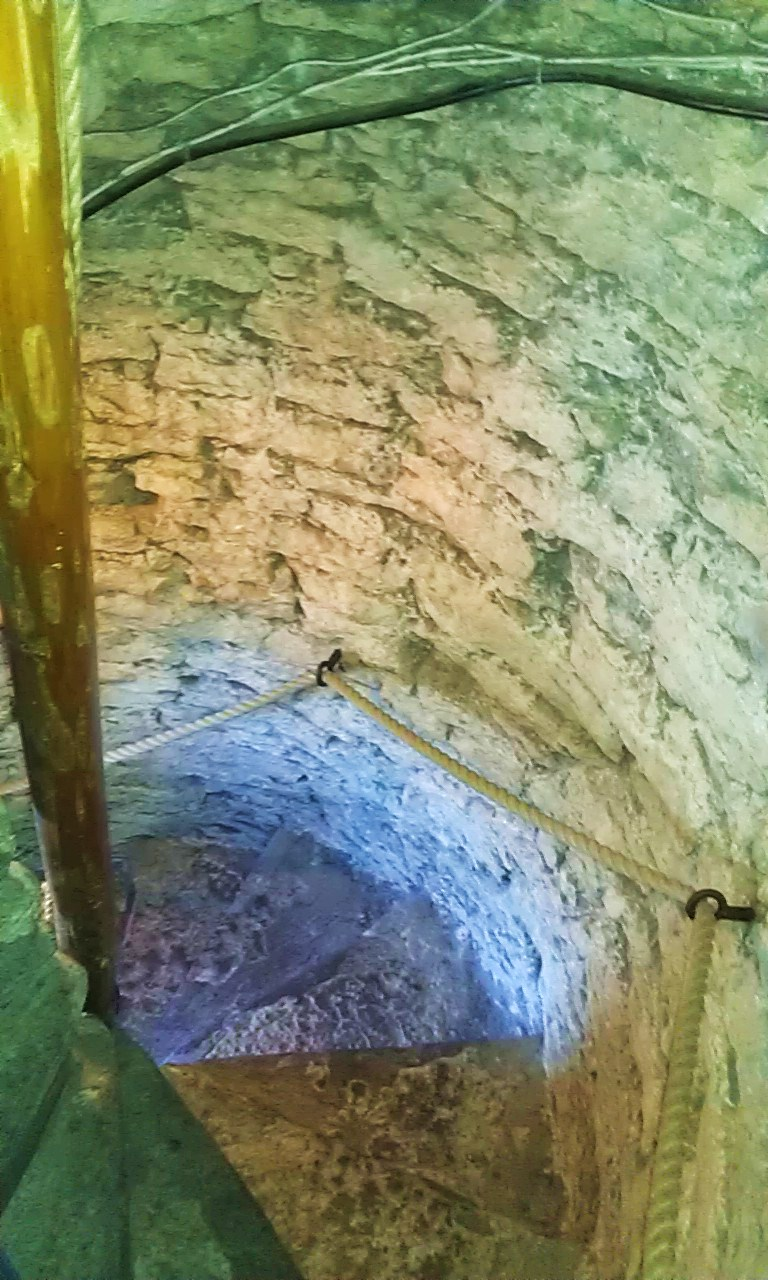
The staircase in the centre of the church
