= St. Oluf's Cemetery =

Historic site in Aarhus, Denmark

Coordinates: 56.158406°N 10.213002°E

St. Oluf Cemetery
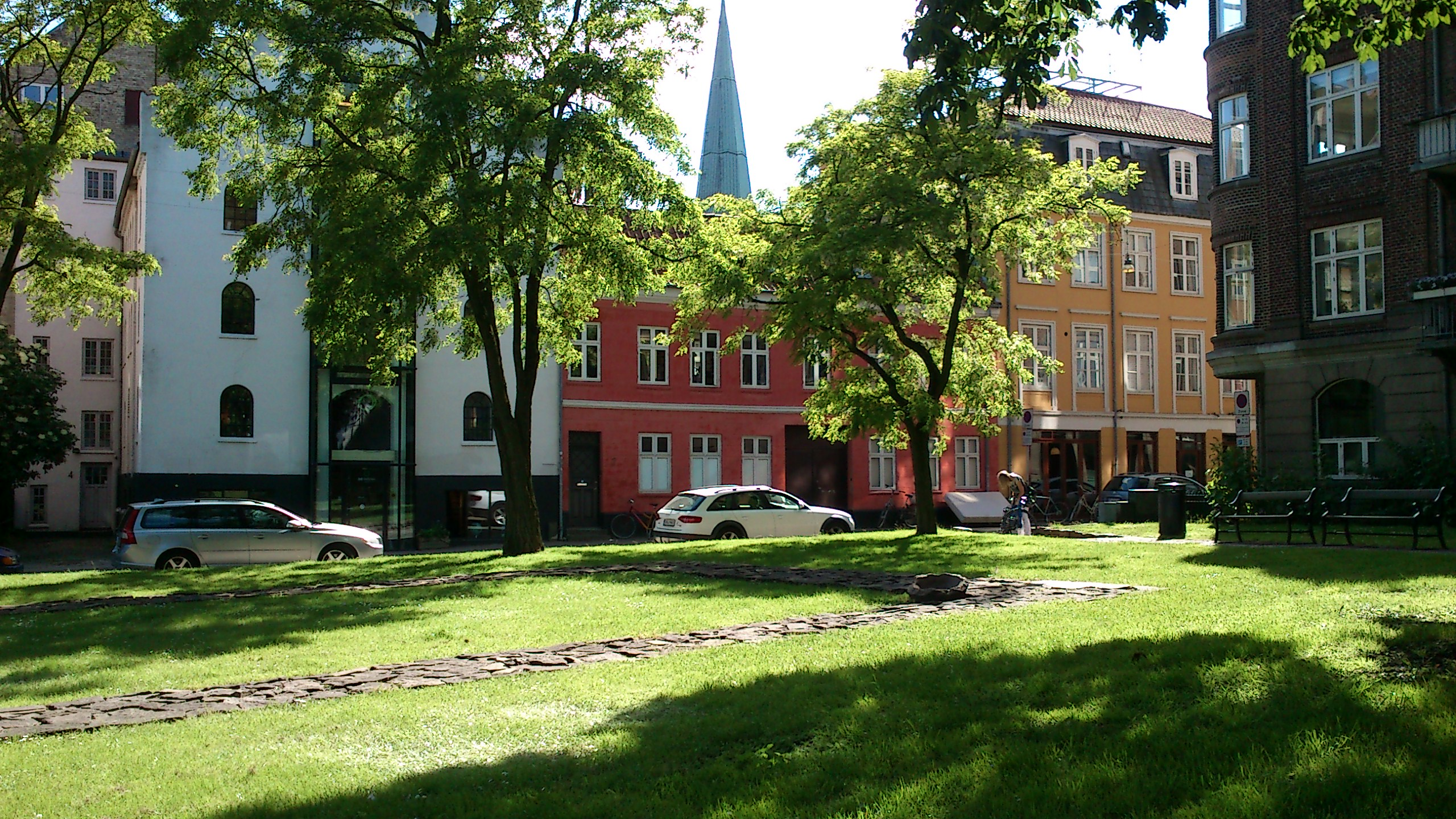
- Interactive map of St. Oluf Cemetery
- Type: Urban park
- Location: Aarhus, Denmark
- Created: Late 17th century
- Owner: Aarhus Municipality
- Operator: Aarhus Municipality

St. Oluf Cemetery (Danish: Sankt Olufs Kirkegård) is a small public park and historic site in central Aarhus, Denmark. The park is situated by the coast in the city center of Midtbyen, in the Latin Quarter, bounded by the streets of Kystvejen and St. Olufs Stræde, overlooking the Docklands and the Bay of Aarhus in the East. It is one of only two green spaces in the historic inner city, the other one being Frue Kirkeplads at the Church of Our Lady, but is one of five protected scheduled monuments.

St. Oluf Cemetery is a decommissioned graveyard turned into a municipal green space, managed by the Nature and Environment department (Danish: Natur og Miljø) of Aarhus Municipality. The park is named after the St. Oluf Church that used to be here, itself named after the Norwegian king and saint Olaf II.

St. Oluf Cemetery functions as a recreational area for locals. The cemetery has not been in use since the early 19th century, but 11 graves from the 17th and 18th centuries are still maintained in the northern section. The park is decorated with trees, bushes and crocus and the outline of the former St. Oluf Church is marked in the grassy area, with ceramic plates of red sandstone.

== History ==
St. Oluf Church is mentioned for the first time in a letter from 14 November 1203 by bishop Peder Vognsen. The church was then located outside the ramparts of the Viking Age town, prominently situated by the coastline and isolated from other structures. In 1548, the church collapsed and the congregation was moved to the cathedral, which had been completed in 1300. In 1637, a chapel was constructed on the former site of the church and the cemetery was again in use until 1768, when the chapel was demolished. In 1897, the cemetery was given over to a local charitable organization, looking to beautify areas in the city and it was maintained as a fenced garden until 1938, when Aarhus Municipality took over responsibility. In the early 1950s, archaeological excavations revealed the former church. The cemetery was last changed in 1953, when the iron fence was removed and the church ruin was marked out with stones. On 20 September 1969, the cemetery and church ruin became a scheduled ancient monument, to be protected from any future change.

In the late 17th century, the section of the cemetery along the coast was more than twice the size of the current area, suggesting that the sanctified graveyard area was quite large, but that it has since been reduced by residential developments on the side running along Mejlgade. The southern border was established in 1767 when St. Olufs Street was expanded all the way to the coast, across the southern section of the cemetery. Archaeological excavations of the church ruin and historical records, suggests that the cemetery and the coast, used to extend further east than nowadays. In the 17th century, records shows that skeletal remains were frequently washed out into the sea, but in 1624 a bulwark is mentioned in connection with a flooding. During an expansion of the nearby Cathedral School in the 1760s, stones were collected on the beaches here, contributing significantly to later erosion. The problems with flooding and erosion persisted into the 1870s, when Kystvejen was developed and the coastline was finally properly secured.

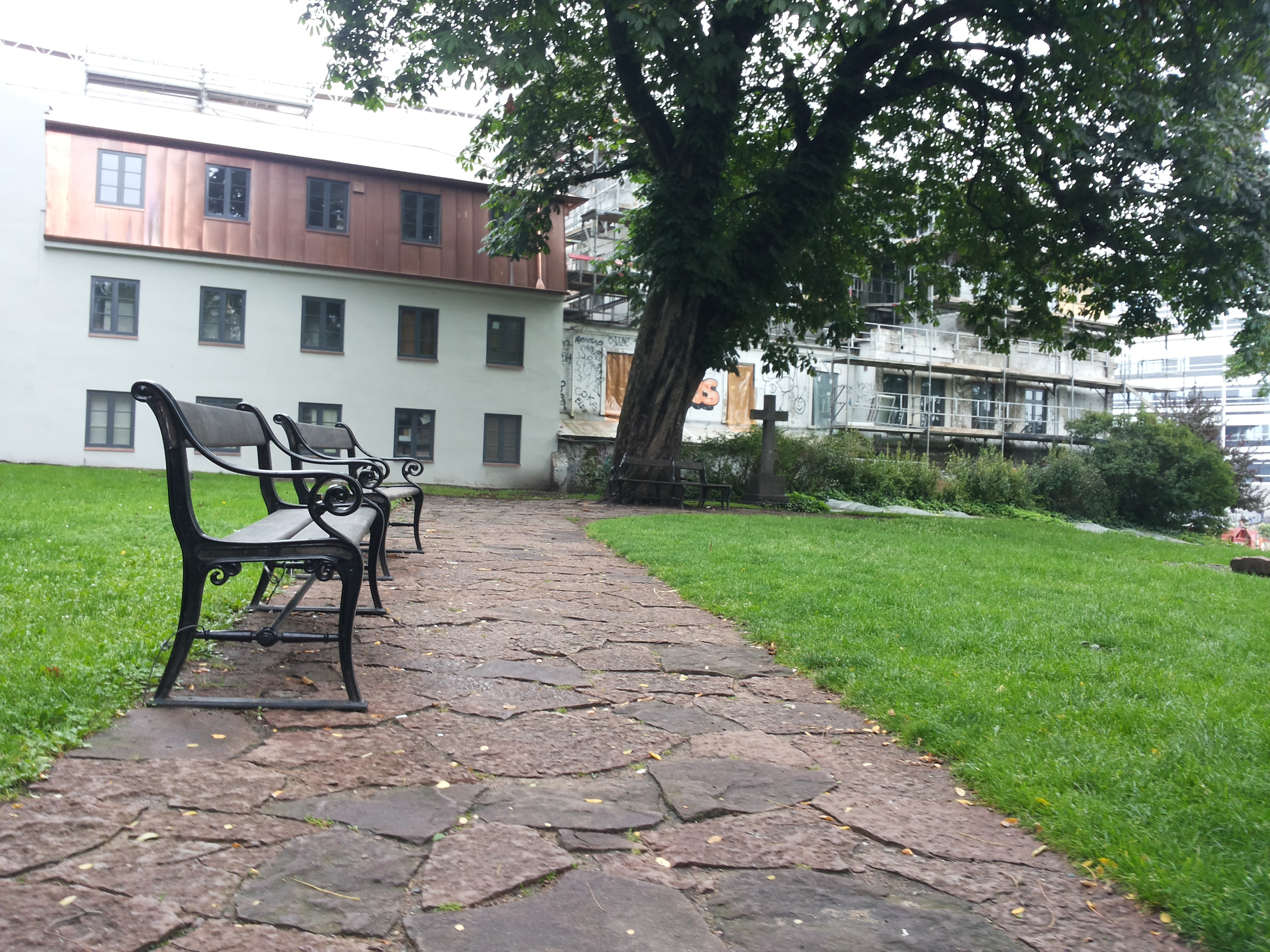
Benches

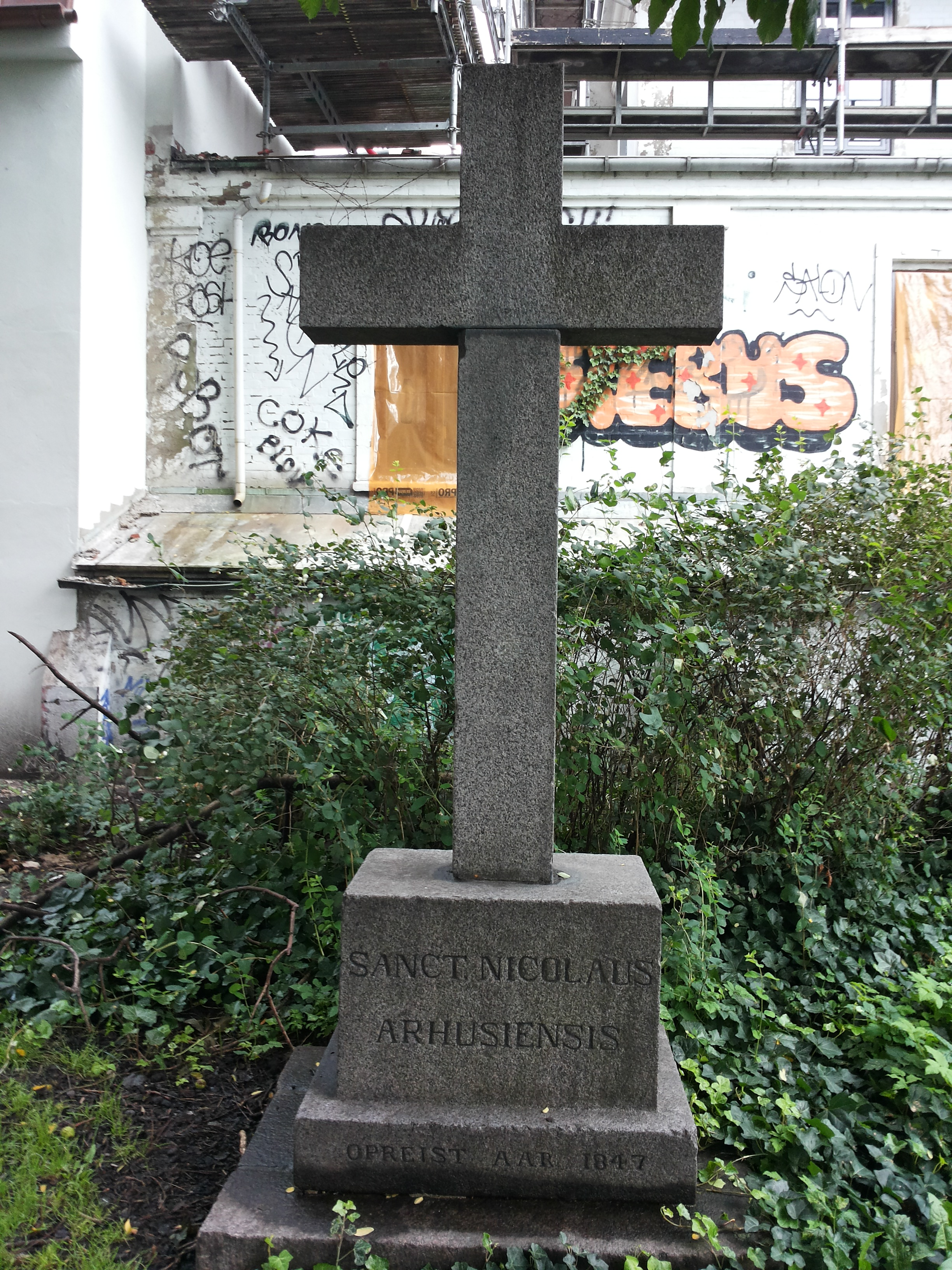
Memorial cross for Sanctus Nicolaus Arusiensis (d.1180)

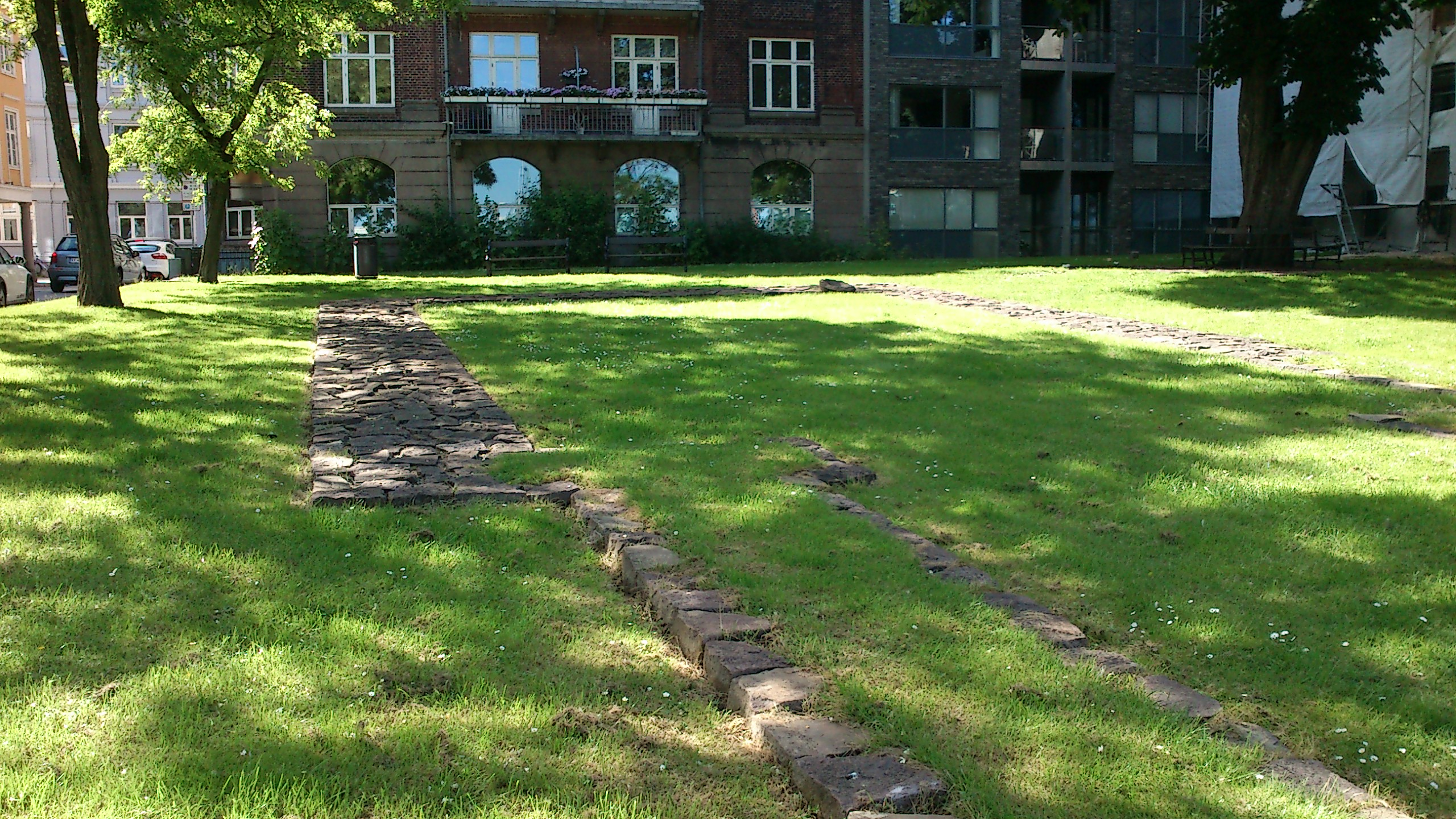
Foundations of the former Church of Saint Oluf
