= Lakenmacher =

Lakenmacher is a surname. Notable people with the surname include:

- Björn Lakenmacher, German politician
- Fynn Lakenmacher (born 2000), German footballer
- Sven Lakenmacher (born 1971), German handball player
- Wolfgang Lakenmacher (1943–2023), German handball player
