= Ómar Ingi Magnússon =

Icelandic handball player (born 1997)

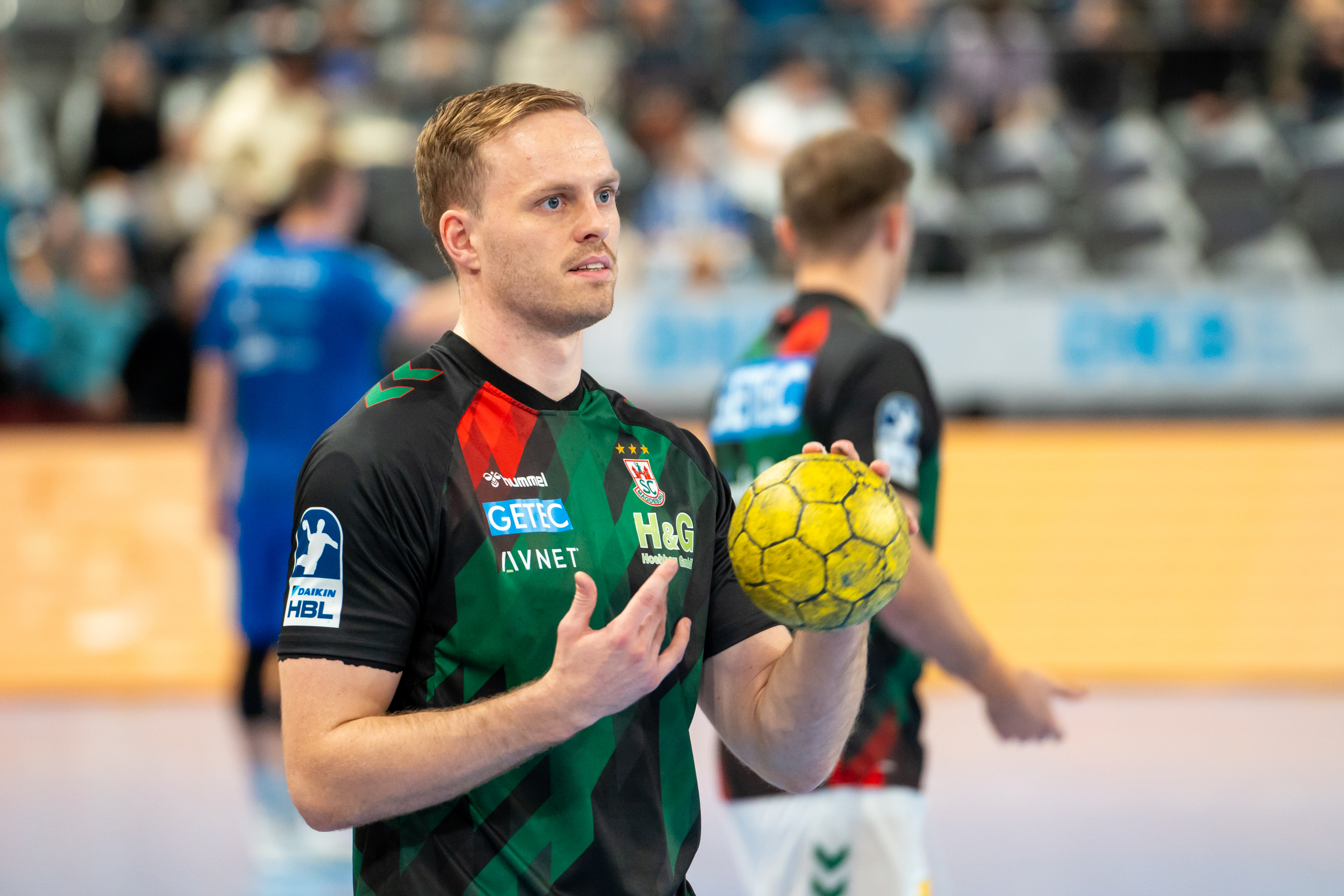

Personal information
- Nationality: Icelandic
- Born: 12 March 1997 (age 29) Selfoss, Iceland
- Height: 1.86 m (6 ft 1 in)

Sport
- Sport: Handball
- Position: Right back
- Current club: SC Magdeburg
- Number: 14

Youth career
- Years: Team
- –2013: Selfoss

Senior clubs
- Years: Team
- 2013–2014: Selfoss
- 2014–2016: Valur
- 2016–2018: Aarhus Håndbold
- 2018–2020: Aalborg Håndbold
- 2020–: SC Magdeburg
National team
Years	Team	Apps	(Gls)
2016–	Iceland	56	(150)

Ómar Ingi Magnússon (born 12 March 1997) is an Icelandic handball player for SC Magdeburg and the Icelandic national handball team. In both 2021 and 2022, he was named the Icelandic Sportsperson of the Year.

== Club career ==
In summer 2014 he switched over to Valur where he was supposed to be a part of the youth setup. He soon started to break through to the first team and earned a squad role, at age 17. He played there until 2016 when he transferred to the Danish club Aarhus Håndbold after an impressive season in Iceland where he was chosen young player of the year. At the beginning of the 2018/19 season in Denmark he transferred to league rivals Aalborg Håndbold, joining fellow nationals Janus Daði Smárason, Arnór Atlason and coach Aron Kristjánsson. With Aalborg he won the Danish Cup competition in 2018 and the Danish championship in 2019 and 2020.

For the 2020/21 season he moved to the German Bundesliga club SC Magdeburg. With Magdeburg he won the EHF European League in 2020/21 and the IHF Super Globe in 2021. He was the top scorer in the Handball-Bundesliga 2020/21, with 274 goals. His superb performance in 2021 earned him the award of Icelandic Sportsperson of the Year and Icelandic Handball player of the Year.

In 2021/22 he became German Champion with Magdeburg, and got a silver medal in EHF European League. He was voted MVP in the Handball-Bundesliga 2021/22. In 2022 he won the IHF Super Globe again with Magdeburg. Yet again he was given the award of Icelandic Sportsperson of the Year and Icelandic Handball player of the Year.

He won the 2022–23 EHF Champions League, although injured and couldn't play in the Final four.

== International career ==
He participated at the 2017 World Men's Handball Championship. On 22 January 2022, he scored 10 goals in a 29–21 victory against France in the 2022 European Men's Handball Championship, despite Iceland missing eight players due to COVID-19. It was also France's biggest loss in the history of the European championship. He was the top scorer at the tournament with 59 goals.

At the 2026 European Men's Handball Championship he finished 4th with Iceland, losing to Denmark in the semifinal and Croatia in the third-place playoff.

== Honours ==
- EHF Champions League:
  - Gold: 2023, 2025
- EHF European League:
  - Gold: 2021
  - Silver: 2022
- IHF Super Globe:
  - Gold: 2021, 2022, 2023
- Handball-Bundesliga:
  - Gold: 2022, 2024
- Danish League
  - Gold: 2019, 2020
- Danish Cup
  - Gold: 2018
- DHB-Pokal:
  - Gold: 2024
  - Silver: 2022, 2023

Individual awards

- MVP Handball-Bundesliga: 2021–22
- Top Scorer Handball-Bundesliga: 2020–21
- Icelandic Sportsperson of the Year: 2021, 2022
- Icelandic Handball player of the Year: 2021, 2022
