= SC Magdeburg =

German handball club

- Full name: Sportclub Magdeburg e. V.
- Short name: SCM
- Founded: 1 March 1955; 71 years ago
- Arena: GETEC Arena
- Capacity: 8,000
- President: Dirk Roswandowicz
- Head coach: Bennet Wiegert
- League: Handball-Bundesliga
- 2025–26: 1st of 18
- Club colours
Home	Away

The SC Magdeburg is a professional handball club from Magdeburg, Germany. The team plays in the highest German league, the Handball-Bundesliga and regularly in highest international competitions. They won the EHF Champions League in 1978, 1981, 2002, 2023 and 2025, the EHF European League in 1999, 2001, 2007 and 2021 and the IHF Men's Super Globe in 2021, 2022 and 2023. The governing body of the handball club is a professional multi-sports club and has also departments for: canoe sprint, athletics, rowing, swimming and gymnastics.

Location of the club

== History ==
SC Aufbau Magdeburg was founded in July 1955. From 1958 they played in the DDR-Oberliga. In the beginning they competed with their rivals ESV Lok Südost Magdeburg to be the biggest club in East Germany.

During the East German era, the club won 10 national handball championships (1970, 1977, 1980, 1981, 1982, 1983, 1984, 1985, 1988, 1991) and won the East German Cup four times. In 1991, SC Magdeburg won the last East German championship before being promoted to the Handball-Bundesliga after the fall of the Berlin Wall. In the 1990's the club was largely a midtable team. In the 1997-98 season they finished 3rd, which marked the rise to the top of German handball. They signed top European players such as Stefan Kretzschmar in 1996, Joël Abati and Guéric Kervadec in 1997, and Ólafur Stefánsson in 1998. They also brought in Alfreð Gíslason as the head coach. The team won the Handball-Bundesliga for the first time in 2001 and the year after they won the Champions League. Since then they have won the German Championship three additional times in 2022, 2024 and 2026. They have also won the DHB-Pokal twice (1996, 2016) and the DHB-Supercup twice (1996, 2001). The club has also won the EHF Champions League five times (1978, 1981, 2002, 2023, 2025), the EHF European League four times (1999, 2001, 2007, 2021), the EHF Super Cup three times (1981, 2001, 2002,) and the IHF Super Globe three times (2021, 2022, 2023).

== Crest, colours, supporters ==
=== Naming history ===
Name	Period
SC Aufbau Magdeburg	1955–1965
SC Magdeburg	1965–present

=== Kit manufacturers ===
Period	Kit manufacturer
– 2005	(United States) Nike
2005–2020	(Germany) Kempa
2020–present	(Denmark) Hummel

=== Kits ===
HOME
2003–05	2011–13	2014–15	2015–16	2017–18	2019–20	2021–

AWAY
2011–13	2014–15	2015–16	2016–17	2017–18	2018–19	2019–20

THIRD
2017–18	2019–20

== Sports Hall information ==
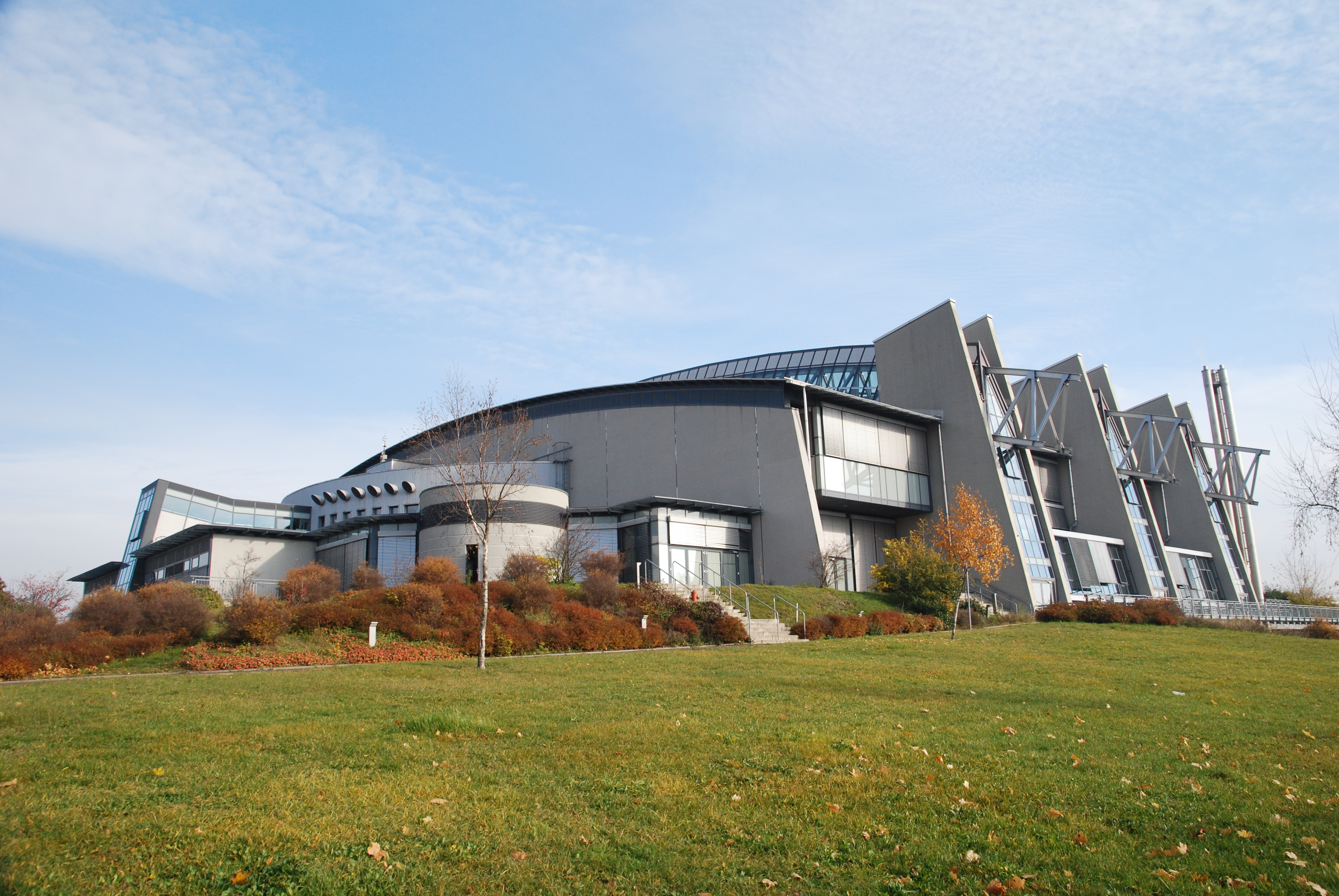
Home ground: GETEC Arena

- Name: – GETEC Arena
- City: – Magdeburg
- Capacity: – 8,000
- Address: – Berliner Chaussee 32, 39114 Magdeburg, Germany

== Team ==
=== Current squad ===
Squad for the 2026–27 season

Goalkeepers

- 1 (Croatia) Dominik Kuzmanović
- 12 (Croatia) Matej Mandić

Left Wingers

- 6 (Germany) Matthias Musche
- 22 (Germany) Lukas Mertens

Right Wingers

- 9 (Denmark) Oskar Vind Rasmussen
- 11 (Sweden) Daniel Pettersson

Line Players

- 4 (Germany) Malte Elze
- 23 (Denmark) Magnus Saugstrup (C)
- 54 (Sweden) Oscar Bergendahl

Left Backs

- 15 (Spain) Antonio Serradilla
- 19 (Iceland) Elvar Örn Jónsson
- 20 (Germany) Philipp Weber

Centre Backs

- 7 (Sweden) Felix Claar
- 8 (Germany) Tim Thielicke
- 10 (Iceland) Gísli Þorgeir Kristjánsson

Right Backs

- 14 (Iceland) Ómar Ingi Magnússon
- 21 (Sweden) Albin Lagergren

=== Technical staff ===
- Head Coach: (Germany) Bennet Wiegert
- Assistant Coach: (Germany) Yves Grafenhorst
- Athletic Trainer: (Germany) Daniel Müller

=== Transfers ===
Transfers for the 2026–27 season

Joining

- (Croatia) Dominik Kuzmanović (GK) from (Germany) VfL Gummersbach
- (Spain) Antonio Serradilla (LB) from (Germany) TVB Stuttgart
- (Denmark) Oskar Vind Rasmussen (RW) from (Denmark) GOG Håndbold

Leaving

- (Norway) Christian O'Sullivan (CB) to (Germany) TBV Lemgo
- (Norway) Sebastian Barthold (LW) to (Denmark) Mors-Thy Håndbold
- (Spain) Sergey Hernández (GK) to (Spain) FC Barcelona
- (Switzerland) Nikola Portner (GK) to (Hungary) SC Pick Szeged
- (Switzerland) Manuel Zehnder (CB) to (Denmark) GOG Håndbold
- (Germany) Tim Hornke (RW) (retires)
- (Germany) Tim Zechel (LP) to (Germany) TSV Hannover-Burgdorf
- (Germany) Niklas Döbbel (RB) to (Germany) Dessau-Roßlauer HV
- (Germany) Monty Kleinsteuber (LW) to (Germany) Eulen Ludwigshafen
- (Germany) Phileas Daniel (CB) to (Germany) Eulen Ludwigshafen

=== Transfers ===
Transfers for the 2027–28 season

Joining

Leaving

- (Iceland) Elvar Örn Jónsson (LB) to (Germany) Rhein-Neckar Löwen

=== Transfers ===
Transfers for the 2028–29 season

Joining

- (France) Thibaud Briet (LB) from (France) HBC Nantes

Leaving

=== Transfer History ===
Transfers for the 2025–26 season

Joining

- (Norway) Sebastian Barthold (LW) from (Denmark) Aalborg Handbold
- (Iceland) Elvar Örn Jónsson (LB) from (Germany) MT Melsungen
- (Croatia) Matej Mandić (GK) from (Croatia) RK Zagreb

Leaving

- (Denmark) Michael Damgaard (LB) to (Denmark) HØJ Elite
- (Spain) Antonio Serradilla (LB) to (Germany) TVB Stuttgart
- (Sweden) Isak Persson (RW) to (Sweden) HK Malmö

== Previous squads ==
2020–2021 Team
Shirt No	Nationality	Player	Birth Date	Position
2	Croatia	Željko Musa	8 January 1986 (age 40)	Line Player
3	Poland	Piotr Chrapkowski	24 March 1988 (age 38)	Left Back
6	Germany	Matthias Musche	18 July 1992 (age 34)	Left Winger
8	Germany	Christoph Steinert	18 January 1990 (age 36)	Right Back
11	Sweden	Daniel Pettersson	6 May 1992 (age 34)	Right Winger
12	Sweden	Tobias Thulin	5 July 1995 (age 31)	Goalkeeper
16	Denmark	Jannick Green	29 September 1988 (age 38)	Goalkeeper
17	Germany	Tim Hornke	4 August 1990 (age 36)	Right Winger
21	Norway	Magnus Gullerud	13 November 1991 (age 34)	Line Player
22	Germany	Lukas Mertens	22 June 1996 (age 30)	Left Winger
23	Iceland	Ómar Ingi Magnússon	12 March 1997 (age 29)	Right Back
24	Norway	Christian O'Sullivan	22 August 1991 (age 35)	Central Back
25	Slovenia	Marko Bezjak	26 June 1986 (age 40)	Central Back
34	Denmark	Michael Damgaard	18 March 1990 (age 36)	Left Back
95	Germany	Moritz Preuss	22 February 1995 (age 31)	Line Player

2015–2016 Team
Shirt No	Nationality	Player	Birth Date	Position
2	Croatia	Željko Musa	8 January 1986 (age 40)	Line Player
5	GermanyPoland	Andreas Rojewski	20 August 1985 (age 41)	Right Back
6	Germany	Matthias Musche	18 July 1992 (age 34)	Left Winger
10	Netherlands	Fabian van Olphen	30 March 1981 (age 45)	Left Back
12	Germany	Philip Ambrosius	28 May 1993 (age 33)	Goalkeeper
13	Slovenia	Jure Natek	30 March 1982 (age 44)	Right Back
14	Denmark	Jacob Bagersted	25 March 1987 (age 39)	Line Player
15	Germany	Yves Grafenhorst	15 March 1984 (age 42)	Left Winger
16	Denmark	Jannick Green	29 September 1988 (age 38)	Goalkeeper
21	Germany	Dario Quenstedt	22 September 1989 (age 37)	Goalkeeper
22	Germany	Andre Czech	17 May 1996 (age 30)	Right Winger
24	Germany	Michael Haaß	12 December 1983 (age 42)	Central Back
25	Slovenia	Marko Bezjak	26 June 1986 (age 40)	Central Back
26	Poland	Maciej Gębala	10 January 1994 (age 32)	Line Player
27	Poland	Tomasz Gębala	23 November 1995 (age 30)	Left Back
28	Austria	Robert Weber	25 November 1985 (age 40)	Right Winger
29	Germany	Alexander Saul	6 October 1995 (age 31)	Right Back
30	Germany	Vincent Sohmann	10 August 1995 (age 31)	Left Winger
33	Germany	Jens Schöngarth	7 December 1988 (age 37)	Right Back
34	Denmark	Michael Damgaard	18 March 1990 (age 36)	Left Back
42	Serbia	Nemanja Zelenović	27 February 1990 (age 36)	Right Back
50	Germany	Finn Lemke	30 April 1992 (age 34)	Left Back

2006–2007 Team
Shirt No	Nationality	Player	Birth Date	Position
1	Germany	Johannes Bitter	2 September 1982 (age 44)	Goalkeeper
2	Germany	Karsten Kommoss	27 January 1981 (age 45)	Right Winger
3	Lithuania	Valdas Novickis	22 February 1986 (age 40)	Central Back
4	Germany	Oliver Roggisch	25 August 1978 (age 48)	Line Player
5	GermanyPoland	Andreas Rojewski	20 August 1985 (age 41)	Right Back
6	Poland	Grzegorz Tkaczyk	23 February 1980 (age 46)	Central Back
7	Germany	Erik Göthel	14 October 1973 (age 53)	Right Winger
8	Poland	Karol Bielecki	23 January 1982 (age 44)	Left Back
9	Germany	Kevin Jahn	2 September 1985 (age 41)	Line Player
10	Netherlands	Fabian van Olphen	30 March 1981 (age 45)	Left Back
11	Germany	Christian Sprenger	6 April 1983 (age 43)	Right Winger
12	Germany	Silvio Heinevetter	21 October 1984 (age 42)	Goalkeeper
13	Germany	Christoph Theuerkauf	13 October 1984 (age 42)	Line Player
14	Germany	Steffen Stiebler	26 April 1971 (age 55)	Left Back
15	Germany	Yves Grafenhorst	15 March 1984 (age 42)	Left Winger
16	Germany	Alexander Hübe	22 April 1983 (age 43)	Goalkeeper
17	Germany	Marc Hohenberg	3 March 1985 (age 41)	Right Winger
18	Germany	Niklas Kupfer	15 March 1986 (age 40)	Left Winger
19	France	Joël Abati	25 April 1970 (age 56)	Right Winger
20	Russia	Oleg Kuleshov	15 April 1974 (age 52)	Central Back
31	Poland	Bartosz Jurecki	31 January 1979 (age 47)	Line Player
73	Germany	Stefan Kretzschmar	17 February 1973 (age 53)	Left Winger

2001–2002 Team
Shirt No	Nationality	Player	Birth Date	Position
1	Denmark	Sune Agerschou	10 March 1974 (age 52)	Goalkeeper
2	Germany	Martin Ziemer	14 April 1983 (age 43)	Goalkeeper
3	Germany	Bennet Wiegert	25 January 1982 (age 44)	Left Back
4	Germany	Maik Machulla	9 January 1977 (age 49)	Central Back
5	Germany	Robert Lux	29 January 1981 (age 45)	Left Back
6	Germany	Stefan Kloppe	21 February 1982 (age 44)	Central Back
7	Germany	Christian Schöne	23 February 1981 (age 45)	Right Winger
8	Iceland	Ólafur Stefánsson	3 July 1973 (age 53)	Right Back
9	France	Guéric Kervadec	9 January 1972 (age 54)	Line Player
10	Serbia	Nenad Peruničić	1 May 1971 (age 55)	Left Back
12	Germany	Andreas Stange	26 February 1981 (age 45)	Goalkeeper
13	Germany	Sven Liesegang	1 July 1969 (age 57)	Right Back
14	Germany	Steffen Stiebler	26 April 1971 (age 55)	Left Back
15	Germany	Ronny Liesche	16 March 1979 (age 47)	Left Winger
16	France	Christian Gaudin	26 January 1967 (age 59)	Goalkeeper
17	Russia	Stanislav Kulinchenko	19 April 1971 (age 55)	Central Back
19	France	Joël Abati	25 April 1970 (age 56)	Right Winger
20	Russia	Oleg Kuleshov	15 April 1974 (age 52)	Central Back
23	Germany	Uwe Mäuer	2 November 1971 (age 54)	Line Player
73	Germany	Stefan Kretzschmar	17 February 1973 (age 53)	Left Winger

2000–2001 Team
Shirt No	Nationality	Player	Birth Date	Position
1	Germany	Henning Fritz	21 September 1974 (age 52)	Goalkeeper
3	Germany	Bennet Wiegert	25 January 1982 (age 44)	Left Back
4	Germany	Maik Machulla	9 January 1977 (age 49)	Central Back
5	Germany	Robert Lux	29 January 1981 (age 45)	Left Back
6	Germany	Stefan Kloppe	21 February 1982 (age 44)	Central Back
7	Germany	Christian Schöne	23 February 1981 (age 45)	Right Winger
8	Iceland	Ólafur Stefánsson	3 July 1973 (age 53)	Right Back
9	France	Guéric Kervadec	9 January 1972 (age 54)	Line Player
10	Russia	Vassili Koudinov	17 February 1969 (age 57)	Left Back
11	Germany	Erik Göthel	14 October 1973 (age 53)	Right Winger
13	Germany	Sven Liesegang	1 July 1969 (age 57)	Right Back
14	Germany	Steffen Stiebler	26 April 1971 (age 55)	Left Back
15	Germany	Ronny Liesche	16 March 1979 (age 47)	Left Winger
16	France	Christian Gaudin	26 January 1967 (age 59)	Goalkeeper
19	France	Joël Abati	25 April 1970 (age 56)	Right Winger
20	Russia	Oleg Kuleshov	15 April 1974 (age 52)	Central Back
22	Germany	Michael Jahns	6 December 1976 (age 49)	Left Back
23	Germany	Uwe Mäuer	2 November 1971 (age 54)	Line Player
73	Germany	Stefan Kretzschmar	17 February 1973 (age 53)	Left Winger

1998–1999 Team
Shirt No	Nationality	Player	Birth Date	Position
1	Germany	Henning Fritz	21 September 1974 (age 52)	Goalkeeper
2	Russia	Vyacheslav Atavin	4 February 1967 (age 59)	Left Back
3	LithuaniaGermany	Vigindas Petkevičius	30 November 1970 (age 55)	Central Back
4	Germany	Maik Machulla	9 January 1977 (age 49)	Central Back
8	Iceland	Ólafur Stefánsson	3 July 1973 (age 53)	Right Back
9	France	Guéric Kervadec	9 January 1972 (age 54)	Line Player
11	Germany	Erik Göthel	14 October 1973 (age 53)	Right Winger
12	Lithuania	Almantas Savonis	6 January 1970 (age 56)	Goalkeeper
13	Germany	Sven Liesegang	1 July 1969 (age 57)	Right Back
14	Germany	Steffen Stiebler	26 April 1971 (age 55)	Left Back
15	Poland	Tomasz Lebiedzinski	19 April 1966 (age 60)	Left Back
19	France	Joël Abati	25 April 1970 (age 56)	Right Winger
23	Germany	Uwe Mäuer	2 November 1971 (age 54)	Line Player
73	Germany	Stefan Kretzschmar	17 February 1973 (age 53)	Left Winger

== Retired numbers ==
N°	Nationality	Player	Position	Tenure
25	(Slovenia)	Marko Bezjak	Centre Back	2013–2023
31	(Poland)	Bartosz Jurecki	Line Player	2006–2015

== Accomplishments ==
=== Domestic ===
- Handball-Bundesliga:
  - Gold: 2001, 2022, 2024, 2026
  - Silver: 2023, 2025
- DHB-Pokal:
  - Gold: 1996, 2016, 2024
  - Silver: 2002, 2015, 2019, 2022, 2023
- DHB-Supercup:
  - Gold: 1996, 2001, 2026
  - Silver: 2022, 2024
- Oberliga: 10
  - Gold: 1970, 1977, 1980, 1981, 1982, 1983, 1984, 1985, 1988, 1991
  - Silver: 1971, 1974, 1975, 1976, 1978, 1979, 1986, 1989
- FDGB-Pokal:
  - Gold: 1977, 1978, 1984, 1990

=== International ===
- EHF Champions League:
  - Gold: 1978, 1981, 2002, 2023, 2025
- EHF Cup Winners' Cup:
  - Silver: 1977, 1979
- EHF Cup / EHF European League:
  - Gold: 1999, 2001, 2007, 2021
  - Silver: 2005, 2022
- EHF Super Cup:
  - Gold: 1981, 2001, 2002
  - Silver: 1999, 2005
- IHF Men's Super Globe:
  - Gold: 2021, 2022, 2023
  - Silver: 2002, 2024
  - Bronze: 2025

== European record ==
=== European Cup and Champions League ===
Season	Round	Club	Home	Away	Aggregate
1977–78; Winners	Round 2	(Socialist Federal Republic of Yugoslavia) Partizan Bjelovar	33–23	21–28	54–51
1977–78; Winners	Quarter-finals	(Czech Republic) Dukla Prague	25–20	22–22	47–42
1977–78; Winners	Semi-finals	(Hungary) Bp. Honvéd	19–17	22–21	41–38
1977–78; Winners	Finals	(Poland) Śląsk Wrocław	28–22		
1980–81; Winners	Round 1	(Austria) ASKÖ Linz	35–18	30–21	65–39
1980–81; Winners	Round 2	(Germany) VfL Gummersbach	19–12	16–16	35–28
1980–81; Winners	Quarter-finals	(Czech Republic) Dukla Prague	23–20	19–17	42–37
1980–81; Winners	Semi-finals	(Sweden) Lugi HF	26–20	20–18	46–38
1980–81; Winners	Finals	(Socialist Federal Republic of Yugoslavia) RD Slovan	29–18	23–25	52–43
2001–02; Winners	Group stage (Group D)	(Hungary) Fotex KC Veszprém	25–22	20–24	2nd
2001–02; Winners	Group stage (Group D)	(France) S.O. Chambéry	31–23	26–26	2nd
2001–02; Winners	Group stage (Group D)	(North Macedonia) Vardar Vatrost. Skopje	33–19	27–27	2nd
2001–02; Winners	Quarter-finals	(Slovenia) RK Celje	29–31	28–25	57–56
2001–02; Winners	Semi-finals	(Denmark) KIF Kolding	29–19	28–25	57–44
2001–02; Winners	Finals	(Hungary) Fotex KC Veszprém	30–25	21–23	51–48
2022–23; Winners	Group stage (Group A)	(Romania) Dinamo București	34–33	30–28	2nd
2022–23; Winners	Group stage (Group A)	(Croatia) PPD Zagreb	35–25	31–25	2nd
2022–23; Winners	Group stage (Group A)	(France) Paris Saint-Germain	22–29	37–33	2nd
2022–23; Winners	Group stage (Group A)	(Poland) Orlen Wisła Płock	33–27	24–25	2nd
2022–23; Winners	Group stage (Group A)	(Hungary) Telekom Veszprém	32–25	35–35	2nd
2022–23; Winners	Group stage (Group A)	(Denmark) GOG Håndbold	36–34	32–33	2nd
2022–23; Winners	Group stage (Group A)	(Portugal) FC Porto	41–36	31–31	2nd
2022–23; Winners	Quarter-finals	(Poland) Orlen Wisła Płock	30–28	22–22	52–50
2022–23; Winners	Semi-finals	(Spain) Barça	40–39		
2022–23; Winners	Finals	(Poland) KS Iskra Kielce	30–29		
2024–25; Winners	Group stage (Group B)	(Hungary) OTP Bank - Pick Szeged	31–24	29–31	4th
2024–25; Winners	Group stage (Group B)	(Norway) Kolstad Håndball	33–25	27–31	4th
2024–25; Winners	Group stage (Group B)	(Denmark) Aalborg Håndbold	32–31	33–33	4th
2024–25; Winners	Group stage (Group B)	(Poland) Industria Kielce	26–27	29–25	4th
2024–25; Winners	Group stage (Group B)	(France) HBC Nantes	28–32	28–29	4th
2024–25; Winners	Group stage (Group B)	(Spain) Barça	28–23	26–32	4th
2024–25; Winners	Group stage (Group B)	(Croatia) RK Zagreb	36–24	18–22	4th
2024–25; Winners	Playoffs	(Romania) CS Dinamo București	35–29	30–26	65–55
2024–25; Winners	Quarter-finals	(Hungary) Telekom Veszprém	26–26	28–27	54–53
2024–25; Winners	Semi-finals	(Spain) Barça	31–30		
2024–25; Winners	Finals	(Germany) Füchse Berlin	32–26		

=== EHF Cup and EHF European League ===
Season	Round	Club	Home	Away	Aggregate
1998–99; Winners	1/16	(Romania) Steaua București	26–16	30–21	56–37
1998–99; Winners	1/8	(France) S.O. Chambéry	22–17	25–27	47–44
1998–99; Winners	1/4	(Croatia) RK Split	26–20	19–14	45–34
1998–99; Winners	1/2	(Germany) TBV Lemgo	22–19	22–23	44–42
1998–99; Winners	Finals	(Spain) BM Valladolid	33–22	21–25	54–47
2000–01; Winners	Round 3	(Slovenia) RK Prevent Slovenj Gradec	26–22	25–23	51–45
2000–01; Winners	Round 4	(Ukraine) ZTR Zaporizhzhia	29–21	22–23	51–44
2000–01; Winners	Quarter-finals	(Germany) TBV Lemgo	23–26	28–22	51–48
2000–01; Winners	Semi-finals	(Spain) CD Bidasoa	32–24	17–23	49–47
2000–01; Winners	Finals	(Croatia) RK Metković	23–22	28–18	51–40
2006–07; Winners	Round 3	(Belarus) BGUFK Minsk	37–26	31–23	68–49
2006–07; Winners	Round 4	(Germany) SG Kronau/Östringen	39–26	34–38	73–64
2006–07; Winners	Quarter-finals	(Denmark) FCK Håndbold	35–27	39–35	74–62
2006–07; Winners	Semi-finals	(Switzerland) Grasshopper – Club Zürich	32–24	27–26	59–50
2006–07; Winners	Finals	(Spain) BM Aragón	31–28	30–30	61–58
2020–21; Winners	Group stage (Group C)	(Russia) CSKA Moscow	37–30	35–27	1st
2020–21; Winners	Group stage (Group C)	(France) Montpellier HB	10–0	32–30	1st
2020–21; Winners	Group stage (Group C)	(Turkey) Beşiktaş JK	41–22	41–23	1st
2020–21; Winners	Group stage (Group C)	(Sweden) Alingsås HK	36–21	29–30	1st
2020–21; Winners	Group stage (Group C)	(Croatia) RK Nexe Našice	28–23	32–24	1st
2020–21; Winners	Round of 16	(North Macedonia) RK Eurofarm Pelister	35–24	32–24	68–54
2020–21; Winners	Quarter-finals	(Sweden) IFK Kristianstad	39–31	34–28	58–52
2020–21; Winners	Semi-final (F4)	(Poland) Orlen Wisła Płock	30–29		
2020–21; Winners	Final (F4)	(Germany) Füchse Berlin	28–25		

=== EHF ranking ===
As of 22 October 2026

Rank	Team	Points
1	(Germany) SC Magdeburg	706
2	(Spain) FC Barcelona Handbol	705
3	(Germany) Füchse Berlin	664
4	(Denmark) Aalborg Håndbold	587
5	(Hungary) Veszprém KC	508
6	(France) HBC Nantes	495
7	(Germany) THW Kiel	462

== Former club members ==
=== Notable former players ===
- (Germany) Johannes Bitter (2003–2007)
- (Germany) Fabian Böhm (2006–2010)
- (Germany) Henning Fritz (1988–2001)
- (Germany) Erik Göthel (1994–2001, 2006–2007)
- (Germany) Yves Grafenhorst (1997–2017)
- (Germany) Michael Haaß (2013–2016)
- (Germany) Silvio Heinevetter (2005–2009)
- (Germany) Tim Hornke (2010–2014, 2019–2026)
- (Germany) Maximilian Janke (2008–2015)
- (Germany) Stephan Just (2003–2005)
- (Germany) Stefan Kneer (2012–2014)
- (Germany) Thomas Knorr (2013–2014)
- (Germany) Stefan Kretzschmar (1996–2007)
- (Germany) Jens Kürbis (1991–1995)
- (Germany) Sven Lakenmacher (1987–1990)
- (Germany) Wolfgang Lakenmacher (1967–1977)
- (Germany) Finn Lemke (2015–2017)
- (Germany) Maik Machulla (1991–2001)
- (Germany) Lukas Mertens (2017–)
- (Germany) Matthias Musche (2011–)
- (Germany) Jürgen Müller (2008–2010)
- (Germany) Moritz Preuss (2019–2022)
- (Germany) Peter Pysall (1974–1990, 1992–1993)
- (Germany) Dario Quenstedt (2000–2011)
- (Germany) Tobias Reichmann (2008–2009)
- (Germany) Markus Richwien (2005–2006)
- (Germany) Oliver Roggisch (2005–2007)
- (Germany) Jürgen Rohde (1967–1973)
- (Germany) (Poland) Andreas Rojewski (2001–2016)
- (Germany) Moritz Schäpsmeier (2012–2013)
- (Germany) Gunar Schimrock (1977–1997)
- (Germany) Erik Schmidt (2019–2020)
- (Germany) Christian Schöne (1996–2005)
- (Germany) Jens Schöngarth (2016)
- (Germany) Christian Sprenger (1998–2009)
- (Germany) Christoph Steinert (2007–2010, 2019–2021)
- (Germany) Steffen Stiebler (1989–2009)
- (Germany) Christoph Theuerkauf (2003–2010)
- (Germany) Philipp Weber (2003–2013, 2021–)
- (Germany) Bennet Wiegert (1989–2004, 2007–2013)
- (Germany) Martin Ziemer (2000–2004)
- (Austria) Robert Weber (2009–2019)
- (Bosnia and Herzegovina) Damir Doborac (2010–2012)
- (Chile) Marco Oneto (2013–2014)
- (Croatia) Dominik Kuzmanović (2026-)
- (Croatia) Matej Mandić (2025-)
- (Croatia) Željko Musa (2015–2021)
- (Denmark) Sune Agerschou (2001–2002)
- (Denmark) Kristian Asmussen (2012–2013)
- (Denmark) Jacob Bagersted (2014–2017)
- (Denmark) Mads Christiansen (2016–2019)
- (Denmark) Michael Damgaard (2015–2025)
- (Denmark) Jannick Green (2014–2022)
- (Denmark) Mike Jensen (2021–2023)
- (Denmark) Oskar Vind Rasmussen (2026-)
- (Denmark) Magnus Saugstrup (2021-)
- (Democratic Republic of the Congo) Damien Kabengele (2007–2010)
- (France) Joël Abati (1997–2007)
- (France) Christian Gaudin (1999–2003)
- (France) Guéric Kervadec (1997–2002)
- (Greece) Alexandros Vasilakis (2007–2009)
- (Hungary) Zsolt Balogh (2010–2011)
- (Iceland) Arnór Atlason (2004–2006)
- (Iceland) Björgvin Páll Gústavsson (2011–2013)
- (Iceland) Einar Hólmgeirsson (2012)
- (Iceland) Gísli Þorgeir Kristjánsson (2020–)
- (Iceland) Ómar Ingi Magnússon (2020–)
- (Iceland) Sigfús Sigurðsson (2002–2006)
- (Iceland) Ólafur Stefánsson (1998–2003)
- (Iceland) Elvar Örn Jónsson (2025-2027)
- (Lithuania) Almantas Savonis (1998–1999)
- (Lithuania) Valdas Novickis (2006–2007)
- (Lithuania) (Germany) Vigindas Petkevičius (1991–1999)
- (Montenegro) Vladan Lipovina (2022-2023)
- (Netherlands) Gerrie Eijlers (2009–2014)
- (Netherlands) Kay Smits (2020, 2021–2023)
- (Netherlands) Fabian van Olphen (2006–2017)
- (Norway) Sebastian Barthold (2025-2026)
- (Norway) Magnus Gullerud (2020–2022)
- (Norway) Espen Lie Hansen (2014–2015)
- (Norway) Nicolay Hauge (2008–2011)
- (Norway) Ole Erevik (2007–2008)
- (Norway) Christian O'Sullivan (2016–2026)
- (Norway) Stian Tønnesen (2007–2013)
- (Poland) Karol Bielecki (2004–2007)
- (Poland) Piotr Chrapkowski (2017–2024)
- (Poland) Maciej Dmytruszyński (2005–2006)
- (Poland) Maciej Gębala (2013–2016)
- (Poland) Tomasz Gębala (2013–2016)
- (Poland) Bartosz Jurecki (2006–2015)
- (Poland) Tomasz Lebiedzinski (1995–1999)
- (Poland) Grzegorz Tkaczyk (2002–2007)
- (Romania) Rareș Jurcă (2002–2003)
- (Romania) Robert Licu (1993–1998, 2003–2004)
- (Russia) Vyacheslav Atavin (1997–2000)
- (Russia) Gleb Kalarash (2017–2018)
- (Russia) Vassili Koudinov (2000–2001)
- (Russia) Oleg Kuleshov (1999–2007)
- (Russia) Stanislav Kulinchenko (2001)
- (Russia) Yuri Nesterov (2005)
- (Slovenia) Marko Bezjak (2013–2023)
- (Slovenia) Jure Natek (2010–2016)
- (Slovenia) Aleš Pajovič (2011–2013)
- (Slovenia) (North Macedonia) Renato Vugrinec (2004–2006)
- (North Macedonia) Filip Kuzmanovski (2019-2020)
- (Spain) Carlos Molina (2017–2019)
- (Spain) Ignacio Plaza Jiménez (2018–2019)
- (Spain) Sergey Hernández (2023-2026)
- (Spain) Antonio Serradilla (2024-2025, 2026-)
- (Serbia) Nenad Peruničić (2001–2004)
- (Serbia) Nemanja Zelenović (2015–2018)
- (Switzerland) Lucas Meister (2022–2024)
- (Switzerland) Nikola Portner (2022-2026)
- (Switzerland) Manuel Zehnder (2024-2026)
- (Sweden) Oscar Bergendahl (2023-)
- (Sweden) Felix Claar (2023-)
- (Sweden) Albin Lagergren (2018–2020, 2023-)
- (Sweden) Isak Persson (2024-2025)
- (Sweden) Daniel Pettersson (2016–)
- (Sweden) Tobias Thulin (2019–2021)

=== Former coaches ===
Seasons	Coach	Country
1991–1993	Hartmut Krüger	(Germany)
1993–1994	Ingolf Wiegert	(Germany)
1994–1999	Lothar Doering	(Germany)
1999	Peter Rost	(Germany)
1999–2006	Alfreð Gíslason	(Iceland)
2006	Ghiță Licu	(Romania)
2006–2007	Bogdan Wenta	(Poland) (Germany)
2007–2008	Helmut Kurrat	(Germany)
2008–2009	Michael Biegler	(Germany)
2010	Sven Liesegang	(Germany)
2010–2013	Frank Carstens	(Germany)
2013–2014	Uwe Jungandreas	(Germany)
2014–2015	Geir Sveinsson	(Iceland)
2015–	Bennet Wiegert	(Germany)

== Youth Handball ==
The SC Magdeburg has 2 Teams in the German Jugendbudesliga one being the A-Juniors and one the B-Juniors. The SCM is the first one to win the German Championship of the B-Junior Bundesliga as it was founded in the season 2024/25.
