= Þórir Hergeirsson =

Icelandic handball coach (born 1964)

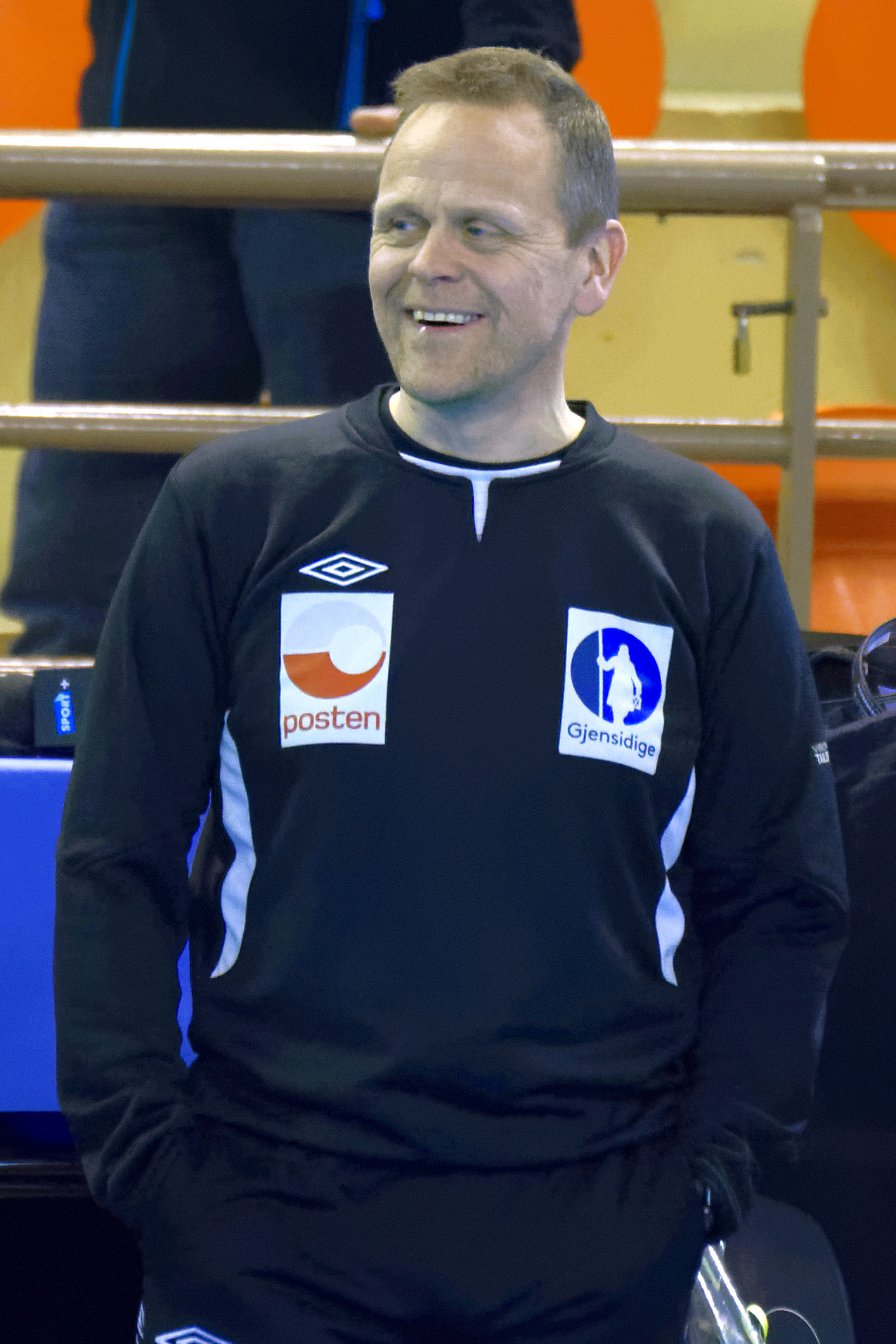
- Þórir in 2015

Personal information
- Nationality: Icelandic
- Born: 27 April 1964 (age 62) Selfoss, Iceland

Sport
- Sport: Handball

Senior clubs
- Years: Team
- –1986: Selfoss

Teams managed
- 1989–1994: Elverum
- 1995–1997: Gjerpen
- 1999–2001: Nærbø
- 2001–2009: Norway (women) [assistant]
- 2009–2024: Norway (women)
Medal record
Women's handball
Representing Norway
Olympic Games
Gold medal – first place	2012 London	Team
Gold medal – first place	2024 Paris	Team
Bronze medal – third place	2016 Rio de Janeiro	Team
Bronze medal – third place	2020 Tokyo	Team
World Championship
Gold medal – first place	2011 Brazil
Gold medal – first place	2015 Denmark
Gold medal – first place	2021 Spain
Silver medal – second place	2017 Germany
Silver medal – second place	2023 Denmark/Norway/Sweden
Bronze medal – third place	2009 China
European Championship
Gold medal – first place	2010 Denmark and Norway
Gold medal – first place	2014 Hungary and Croatia
Gold medal – first place	2016 Sweden
Gold medal – first place	2020 Denmark
Gold medal – first place	2022 Slovenia/North Macedonia/Montenegro
Gold medal – first place	2024 Austria/Hungary/Switzerland
Silver medal – second place	2012 Serbia

Þórir Hergeirsson (Icelandic: [ˈθouːrɪr̥ ˈhɛrceirsˌsɔːn]; Norwegian: Thorir Hergeirsson; born 27 April 1964) is an Icelandic handball coach and former player. He is one of the most decorated national team coaches in handball history and won seventeen championship medals with the Norwegian women's national team during a fifteen-year reign, including two Olympic gold medals, three World Championships titles and six European Championships titles. Þórir coached clubs Elverum, Gjerpen and Nærbø, before becoming the assistant coach of the Norwegian national team in 2001 and succeeding Marit Breivik as head coach in 2009. He stepped down from the national team in December 2024.

== Early life ==
Born on 27 April 1964, Þórir was born and raised in Selfoss.

== Playing career ==
Þórir played for Selfoss handball team until 1986, when he moved to Norway to study at the Norwegian School of Sport Sciences. He continued playing for a short while in Norway before fully focusing on his coaching career.

== Coaching career ==
Þórir's first coaching experience was with Selfoss junior teams. Shortly after moving to Oslo in 1986 to further his education he was hired as the head coach of Elverum men's team. He later coached at Gjerpen Håndball and Nærbø IL.

Þórir has been part of the Norway national coaching team since 2001, and took over as head coach in April 2009, succeeding former head coach Marit Breivik.

He led the Norwegian team to bronze medals at the 2009 World Women's Handball Championship, gold medals at the 2010 European Women's Handball Championship, gold medals at the 2011 World Women's Handball Championship, and gold medals at the 2012 Summer Olympics.

In August 2016, he won Bronze with Norway at the 2016 Summer Olympics. In December 2016, he guided the team to gold at the 2016 European Women's Handball Championship despite losing his mother the day before the tournament started.

Þórir has been awarded the title Norwegian Sports Coach of the Year at Idrettsgallaen twice. His first win in 2007 was shared with Marit Breivik. In 2023, he won the award again.

In September 2024, Þórir announced that the current season would be his last as head coach of the national team. He was succeeded by Ole Gustav Gjekstad from January 2025.

In November 2026 Þórir was appointed as elite sports manager at the Icelandic Handball Association.

== Achievements ==
Olympic Games

- 2012 – 1st
- 2016 – 3rd
- 2020 – 3rd
- 2024 – 1st

World Championship

- 2009 – 3rd
- 2011 – 1st
- 2013 – 5th
- 2015 – 1st
- 2017 – 2nd
- 2019 – 4th
- 2021 – 1st
- 2023 – 2nd

European Championship

- 2010 – 1st
- 2012 – 2nd
- 2014 – 1st
- 2016 – 1st
- 2018 – 5th
- 2020 – 1st
- 2022 – 1st
- 2024 – 1st

== Personal life ==
Þórir's daughter Maria Thorisdottir is a Norwegian international footballer. Þórir's brother is Grímur Hergeirsson, himself a handball coach and former player.

He is the uncle of the Icelandic national team player Janus Daði Smárason.

On 21 March 2017, Þórir was made a Knight 1st Class of the Royal Norwegian Order of Merit. In January 2025, he was made a Knight of the Order of the Falcon.

Sporting positions
Preceded by Marit Breivik	Norway women's national handball team head coach 2009 – 2024	Succeeded by Ole Gustav Gjekstad
