= Selfoss (men's handball) =

Icelandic men's handball team

- Full name: Ungmennafelag Selfoss
- Short name: Selfoss
- Founded: 1965
- Arena: Hleðsluhöllin, Selfossׂ
- Capacity: 700
- President: Þórir Haraldsson
- Head coach: Carlos Martin Santos
- League: Úrvalsdeild karla
- 2023-2024: 12
- Club colours
| Home | Away |

The Selfoss men's handball team is the men's handball section of Icelandic multi-sport club Selfoss from Selfoss. It currently plays in the Úrvalsdeild karla. In the 2018–19 season Selfoss won it first Icelandic Championships title when they beat Haukar 35-25 and the series 3–1.

== History ==
Selfoss currently plays in Úrvalsdeild karla. In the 2018–19 season Selfoss won it first Icelandic Championships title when they beat Haukar 35-25 and the series 3–1.

== Crest, colours, supporters ==
=== Kits ===
AWAY

2018–19

== Men's team ==
=== Current squad ===
As of the 2024–25 season.

Goalkeepers

- 1 (Iceland) Ísak Kristinn Jónsson
- 12 (Iceland) Alexander Hrafnkelsson
- 26 (Iceland) Jón Þórarinn Þorsteinsson

Left wingers

- 9 (Iceland) Patrekur Þ. G. Öfjörð
- 19 (Iceland) Hannes Höskuldsson
- 31 (Iceland) Árni Ísleifsson

Right wingers

- 20 (Iceland) Guðjón Baldursson
- 21 (Iceland) Jason Dagur Þórisson

Pivots

- 5 (Iceland) Elvar Elí Hallgrímsson
- 10 (Iceland) Sverrir Pálsson
- 13 (Iceland) Valdimar Örn Ingvarsson

Left backs

- 6 (Iceland) Skarphéðinn S. Sveinsson
- 11 (Spain) Alvaro Mallols Fernandez
- 23 (Iceland) Anton Breki Hjaltason
- 25 (Iceland) Hákon Garri Gestsson
- 44 (Iceland) Vilhelm Freyr Steindórsson

Central backs

- 16 (Iceland) Jónas Karl Gunnlaugsson
- 32 (Iceland) Tryggvi S. Traustason
- 33 (Iceland) Haukur Páll Hallgrímsson

Right backs

- 7 (Iceland) Sölvi Svavarsson

=== Notable former players ===
- (Iceland) Árni Steinn Steinþórsson
- (Iceland) Atli Ævar Ingólfsson
- (Iceland) Bjarki Már Elísson
- (Iceland) Einar Gunnar Sigurðsson
- (Iceland) Einar Sverrisson
- (Iceland) Einar Þorvarðarson
- (Iceland) Elvar Örn Jónsson
- (Iceland) Gústaf Bjarnason
- (Iceland) Hannes Jón Jónsson
- (Iceland) Haukur Þrastarson
- (Iceland) Hergeir Grímsson
- (Iceland) Janus Daði Smárason
- (Iceland) Ómar Ingi Magnússon
- (Iceland) Ragnar Jóhansson
- (Lithuania) Ramunas Mikalonis
- (Iceland) Sebastian Alexandersson
- (Iceland) Sigurður Sveinsson
- (Iceland) Sigfús Sigurðsson
- (Iceland) Teitur Örn Einarsson
- (Iceland) Valdimar Grímsson
- (Iceland) Valdimar Þórsson
- (Lithuania) Vilius Rasimas
- (Iceland) Þórir Ólafsson
- (Iceland) Þórir Hergeirsson

== Trophies ==
- Icelandic Championships (1):
  - Gold: 2019
- Icelandic 1. division (3):
  - Gold: 1998, 2001, 2010
- Icelandic 2. division (1):
  - Gold: 1987

== Recent history ==
| Season | | Pos. | Pl. | W | D | L | GS | GA | P | Playoffs | Cup | Notes |
|---|---|---|---|---|---|---|---|---|---|---|---|---|
| 2007-08 | 1.deild | 4 | 24 | 14 | 3 | 7 | 733 | 667 | 31 | | First round | |
| 2008-09 | 1.deild | 2 | 21 | 17 | 0 | 4 | 693 | 553 | 34 | | Semi-finals | |
| 2009-10 | 1.deild | ↑ 1 | 18 | 15 | 0 | 3 | 559 | 426 | 30 | | Quarter finals | Promoted to Úrvalsdeild |
| 2010-11 | Úrvalsdeild | 8 | 21 | 3 | 4 | 14 | 586 | 650 | 10 | | Quarter finals | Relegated to 1.deild |
| 2011-12 | 1.deild | 4 | 20 | 9 | 4 | 7 | 535 | 504 | 22 | | first round | |
| 2012-13 | 1.deild | 5 | 21 | 11 | 1 | 9 | 556 | 512 | 23 | | Semi-finals | |
| 2013-14 | 1.deild | 3 | 20 | 16 | 1 | 3 | 571 | 463 | 33 | | Quarter finals | |
| 2014-15 | 1.deild | 4 | 24 | 13 | 3 | 8 | 623 | 557 | 29 | | Second round | |
| 2015-16 | 1.deild | ↑ 3 | 21 | 17 | 0 | 4 | 617 | 521 | 34 | Promoted via play-offs | Second round | Promoted to Úrvalsdeild |
| 2016-17 | Úrvalsdeild | 5 | 27 | 11 | 2 | 14 | 774 | 788 | 24 | Quarter finals | Quarter finals | |
| 2017-18 | Úrvalsdeild | 2 | 22 | 17 | 0 | 5 | 682 | 601 | 34 | Semi-finals | Semi-finals | |
| 2018-19 | Úrvalsdeild | 2 | 22 | 16 | 2 | 4 | 629 | 578 | 34 | Champions | Quarter finals | EHF European League 3.round |
| 2019-20 | Úrvalsdeild | 5 | 20 | 12 | 1 | 7 | 618 | 609 | 25 | Canceled | Second round | |
| 2020-21 | Úrvalsdeild | 4 | 22 | 12 | 2 | 8 | 577 | 562 | 26 | Quarter finals | First round | EHF European League 2.round |
| 2021-22 | Úrvalsdeild | 5 | 22 | 12 | 2 | 8 | 612 | 597 | 26 | Semi-finals | Semi-finals | |
| 2022-23 | Úrvalsdeild | 7 | 22 | 11 | 2 | 9 | 669 | 677 | 24 | Quarter finals | Second round | |
| 2023-24 | Úrvalsdeild | 12 | 22 | 4 | 0 | 18 | 527 | 643 | 8 | | Quarter finals | Relegated to 1.deild |
| 2024-25 | 1.deild | ↑ 2 | 16 | 13 | 1 | 2 | 501 | 431 | 27 | Promoted via play-offs | Second round | Promoted to Úrvalsdeild |

== European record ==
| Competition | Matches | W | D | L | GF | GA |
|---|---|---|---|---|---|---|
| EHF European League | 16 | 6 | 0 | 10 | 418 | 423 |
| EHF European Cup | 4 | 2 | 2 | 0 | 112 | 108 |

=== Matches ===
| Season | Competition | Round | Opponents | 1st leg | 2nd leg | Aggregate |
|---|---|---|---|---|---|---|
| 1993-94 | EHF Cup Winners' Cup | 1R | (Latvia) HC Bauska Riga | 32–22 | 30–24 | 56-52 |
| 1993-94 | EHF Cup Winners' Cup | L16 | (Croatia) RK "Itu" Umag | 25–18 | 29–21 | 47–46 |
| 1993-94 | EHF Cup Winners' Cup | QF | (Hungary) SC Pick Szeged | 30–18 | 32–20 | 50–50 |
| 1994-95 | EHF Cup | L16 | (Slovenia) RK Gorenje Velenje | 19–24 | 16–15 | 34–40 |
| 2018-19 | EHF European League | 1R | (Lithuania) Dragūnas Klaipėda | 34–28 | 27–26 | 60-55 |
| 2018-19 | EHF European League | 2R | (Slovenia) RD Ribnica | 30–27 | 32–26 | 59–56 |
| 2018-19 | EHF European League | 3R | (Poland) KS Azoty-Puławy | 33–26 | 28–27 | 54–60 |
| 2019-20 | EHF European League | 2R | (Sweden) HK Malmö | 33–27 | 29–31 | 56–64 |
| 2020-21 | EHF European Cup | 1R | (Czech Republic) KH ISMM Kopřivnice | 31–25 | 28–28 | 59–53 |
| 2020-21 | EHF European Cup | 2R | (Slovenia) RK Jeruzalem Ormož | 31–31 | 24-22 | 53-55 |

Notes

- 1R: First round
- 2R: Second round
- 3R: Third round
- L16: Round of 16
- QF: Quarter finals

== Player of the Season ==
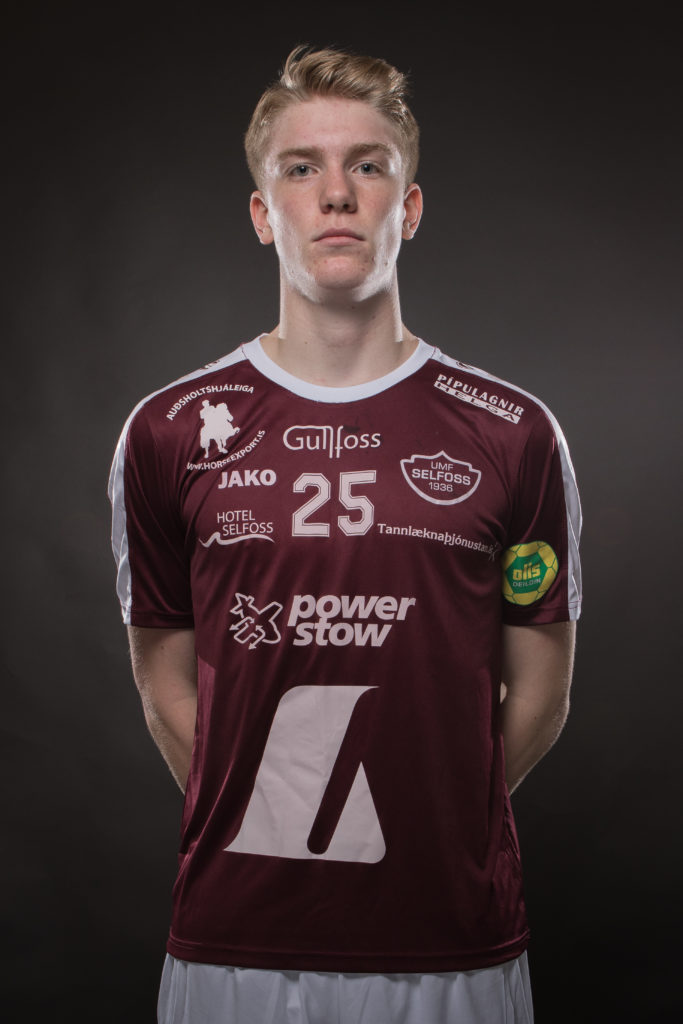
Haukur Þrastarson,two-time winner of the award

| Season | Name | Nationality | Position |
|---|---|---|---|
| 2017-2018 | Haukur Þrastarson | Iceland | Centre back |
| 2018-2019 | Elvar Örn Jónsson | Iceland | Centre back |
| 2019-2020 | Haukur Þrastarson (2) | Iceland | Centre back |
| 2020-2021 | Vilius Rašimas | Lithuania | Goalkeeper |
| 2021-2022 | Hergeir Grímsson | Iceland | Centre back |

== Managerial History ==
- (Iceland) Þorvaldur Þórðarson (1978–79)
- (Iceland) Guðmundur Sigurbjörnsson (1981–82)
- (Iceland) Gunnlaugar Hjálmarsson (1983–85)
- (Iceland) Steindór Gunnarsson (1986–87)
- (Iceland) Helgi Ragnarsson (1987-1988)
- (Iceland) Guðmundur Magnússon (1988-1989)
- (Iceland) Björgvin Björgvinsson (1989-1991)
- (Iceland) Einar Þorvarðarson (1991-1994)
- (Serbia) Jezdimir Stankovic (1994-1995*)
- (Iceland) Valdimar Grímsson (1995-1996)
- (Iceland) Guðmundur Karlsson (1996-1997)
- (Iceland) Sigurjón Bjarnason (1997-1999)
- (Iceland) Einar Guðmundsson (1999-2002)
- (Iceland) Gísli Rúnar Guðmundsson (2002-2003)
- (Iceland) Sebastian Alexandersson (2003-2011)
- (Iceland) Stefán Arnar Gunnarsson (2011-2013)
- (Iceland) Gunnar Gunnarsson (2013-2015)
- (Iceland) Stefán Árnason (2015-2017)
- (Iceland) Patrekur Jóhannesson (2017-2019)
- (Iceland) Grímur Hergeirsson (2019-2020)
- (Iceland) Halldór Jóhann Sigfússon (2020-2022)
- (Iceland) Þórir Ólafsson (2022-2024)
- (Spain) Carlos Martin Santos (2024-
- (Iceland) *Þórarinn Ingólfsson took charge in the middle of the season.
