= Janus Daði Smárason =

Icelandic handball player (born 1995)

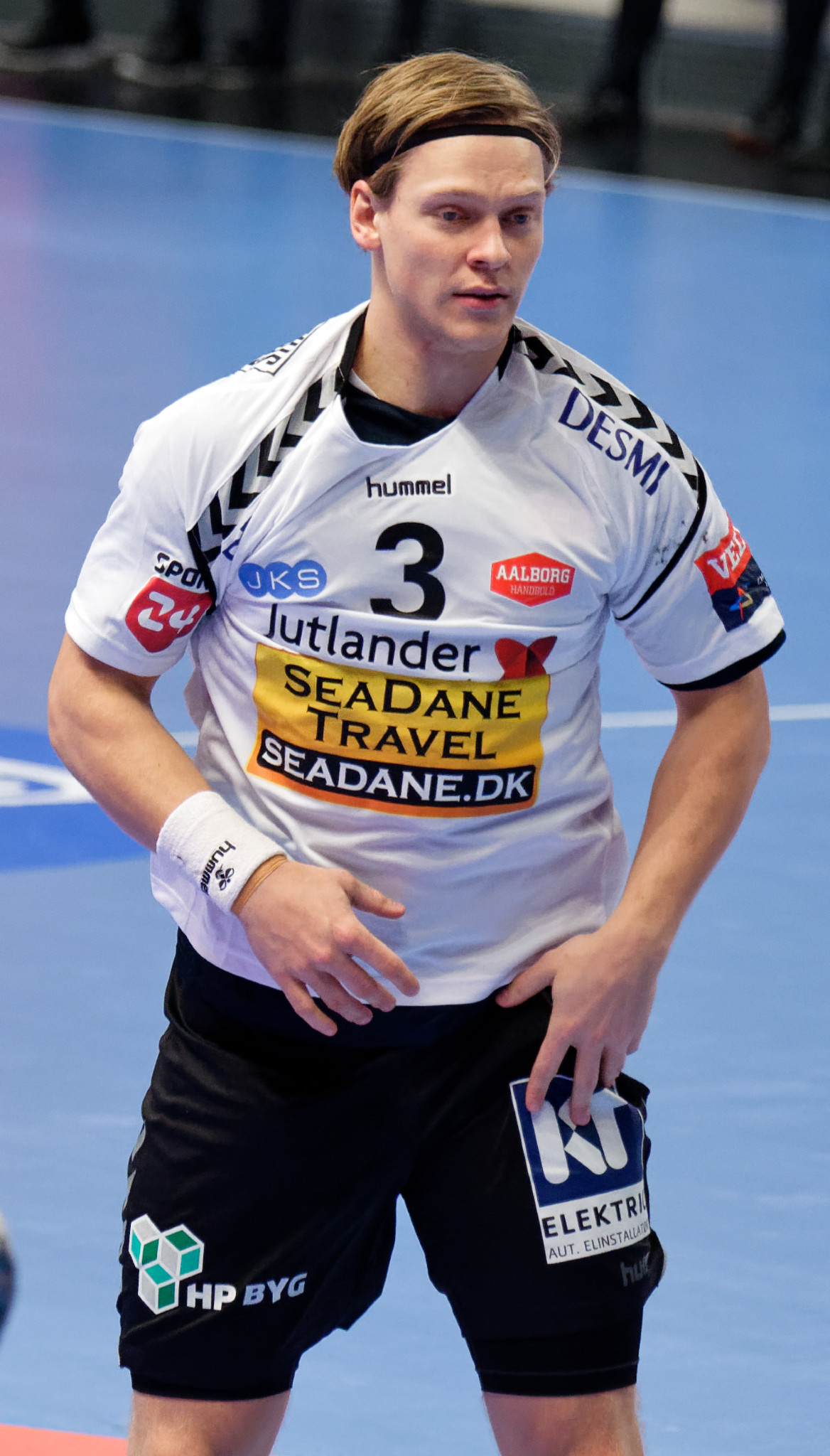
- Janus Daði Smárason in 2017.

Personal information
- Nationality: Icelandic
- Born: 1 January 1995 (age 31) Selfoss, Iceland
- Height: 1.84 m (6 ft 0 in)

Sport
- Sport: Handball
- Position: Centre back
- Current club: FC Barcelona
- Number: 3

Youth career
- Years: Team
- 2002–2012: Selfoss
- 2012–2014: Aarhus Håndbold

Senior clubs
- Years: Team
- 2011–2012: Selfoss
- 2014–2017: Haukar
- 2017–2020: Aalborg Håndbold
- 2020–2022: Frisch Auf Göppingen
- 2022–2023: Kolstad Håndball
- 2023–2024: SC Magdeburg
- 2024–2026: OTP Bank-Pick Szeged
- 2026–: FC Barcelona
National team
Years	Team	Apps	(Gls)
2017–	Iceland	72	(114)
- Updated on 8. January 2024

Janus Daði Smárason (born 1 January 1995) is an Icelandic handball player for FC Barcelona and the Icelandic national handball team.

He participated at the 2017 World Men's Handball Championship. At the 2026 European Men's Handball Championship he finished 4th with Iceland, losing to Denmark in the semifinal and Croatia in the third-place playoff.
