= Dario Quenstedt =

German handball player (born 1989)

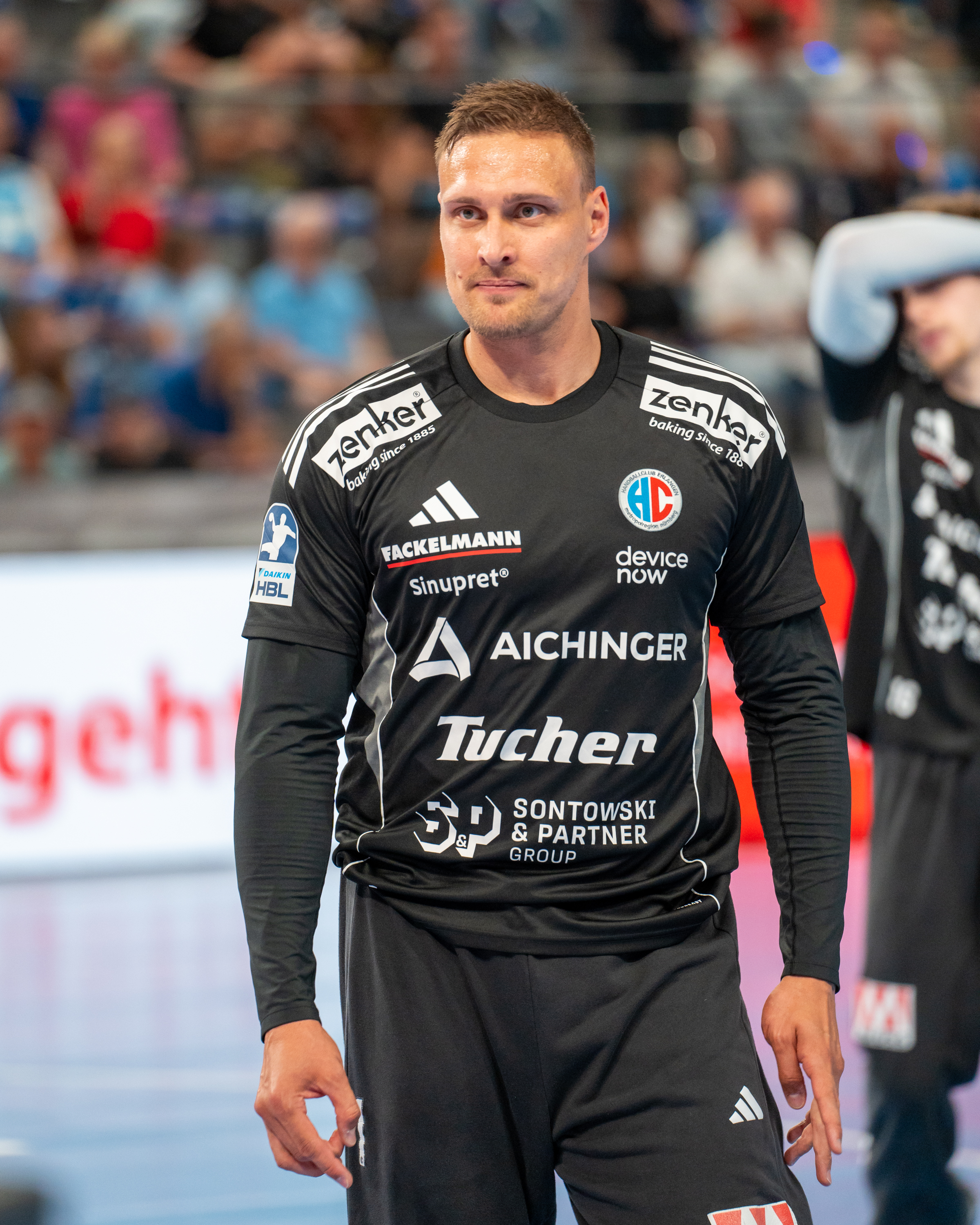
- Dario Quenstedt 2026

Personal information
- Nationality: German
- Born: 22 September 1989 (age 37) Burg bei Magdeburg, GDR
- Height: 1.90 m (6 ft 3 in)

Sport
- Sport: Handball
- Position: Goalkeeper
- Current club: TSV Hannover-Burgdorf

Senior clubs
- Years: Team
- 2007–2011: SC Magdeburg
- 2011–2013: TuS N-Lübbecke
- 2013–2019: SC Magdeburg
- 2019–2022: THW Kiel
- 2022–2024: TSV Hannover-Burgdorf
- 2024-: HC Erlangen
National team
Years	Team	Apps	(Gls)
2012-	Germany	12	(1)

Dario Quenstedt (born 22 September 1989) is a German handball player who plays for TSV Hannover-Burgdorf and the German national team.
