= Christian O'Sullivan =

Norwegian handball player (born 1991)

- Christian O'Sullivan

Personal information
- Nationality: Norwegian; British
- Born: 22 August 1991 (age 35) Oslo, Norway
- Height: 1.90 m (6 ft 3 in)

Sport
- Sport: Handball
- Position: Centre back
- Current club: SC Magdeburg
- Number: 24

Senior clubs
- Years: Team
- –2014: Bækkelagets SK
- 2014–2016: IFK Kristianstad
- 2016–2026: SC Magdeburg
- 2026–: TBV Lemgo
National team
Years	Team	Apps	(Gls)
2012–2025	Norway	206	(298)
Medal record
World Championship
Silver medal – second place	2017 France
Silver medal – second place	2019 Germany/Denmark
European Championship
Bronze medal – third place	2020 Sweden/Austria/Norway

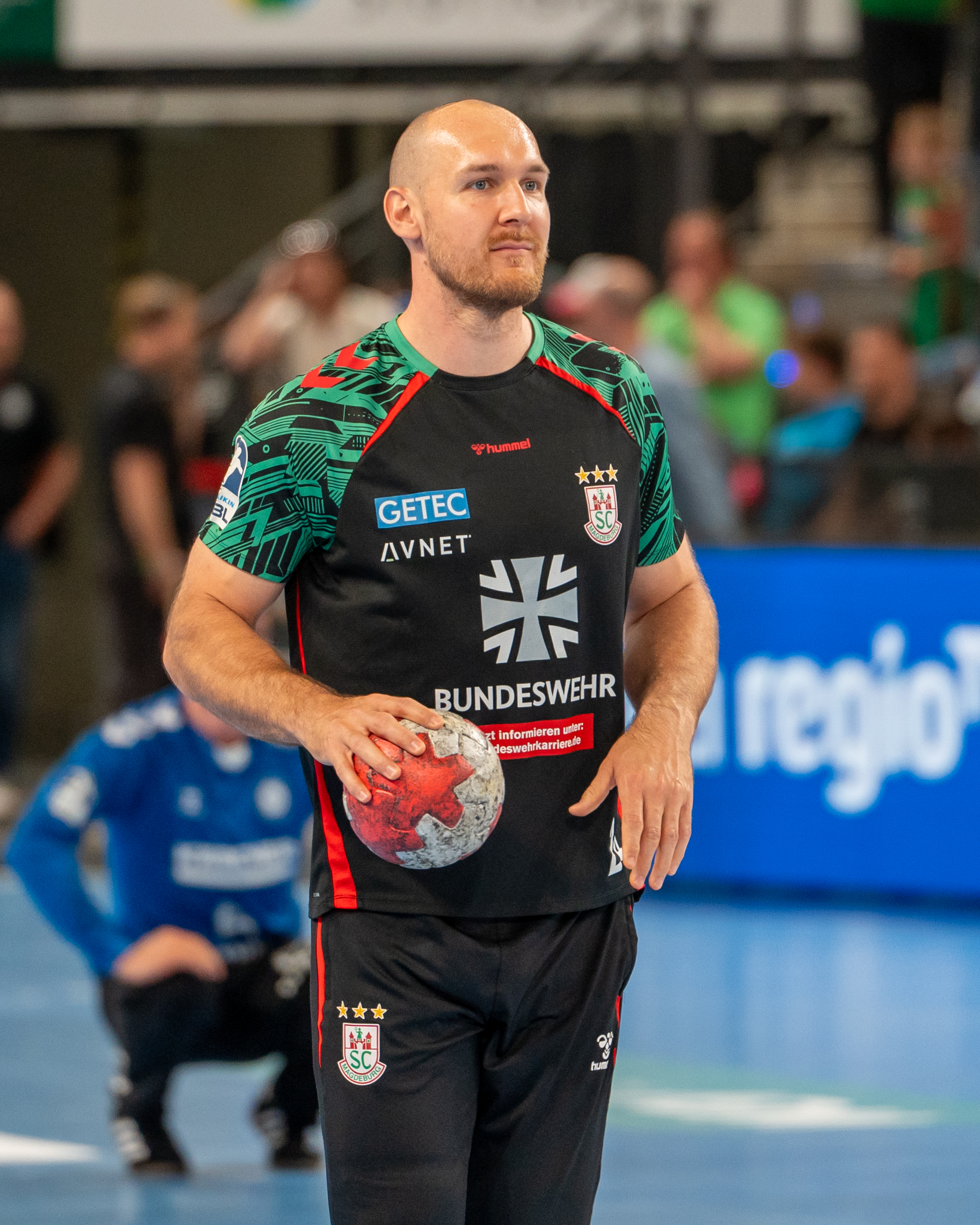
O'Sullivan with SC Magdeburg

Christian O'Sullivan (born 22 August 1991) is a Norwegian handball player who plays for SC Magdeburg and formerly the Norwegian national team.

He participated at the 2019 World Men's Handball Championship.

== Career ==
O'Sullivan began his career in the Norwegian club Bækkelagets SK. In 2014, he moved to the Swedish club Kristianstad, where he won twice the Swedish Championship. In 2016, O'Sullivan moved to German club SC Magdeburg.
