= Tim Hornke =

German handball player (born 1990)

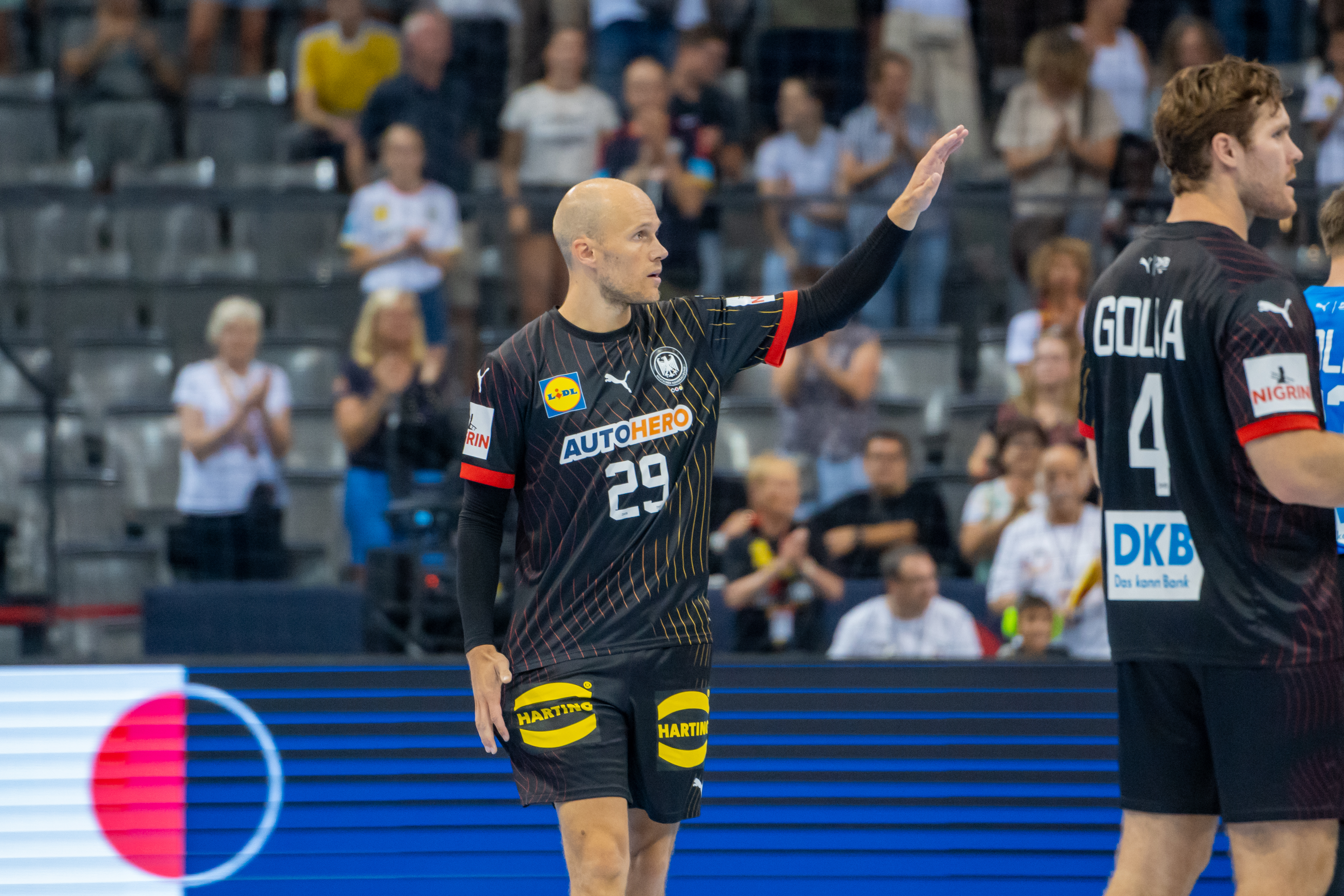
- Hornke in 2024

Personal information
- Nationality: German
- Born: 4 August 1990 (age 36) Hannover, Germany
- Height: 1.88 m (6 ft 2 in)

Sport
- Sport: Handball
- Position: Right wing
- Current club: SC Magdeburg
- Number: 17

Senior clubs
- Years: Team
- 2009–2010: HSV Hannover
- 2010–2014: SC Magdeburg
- 2014–2019: TBV Lemgo
- 2019–2026: SC Magdeburg
National team
Years	Team	Apps	(Gls)
2017–	Germany	23	(57)
Medal record
Olympic Games
Silver medal – second place	2024 Paris	Team
- Updated on 12 August 2024

Tim Hornke (born 4 August 1990) is a German handball player who plays for SC Magdeburg and the German national team.
