= Matthias Musche =

German handball player (born 1992)

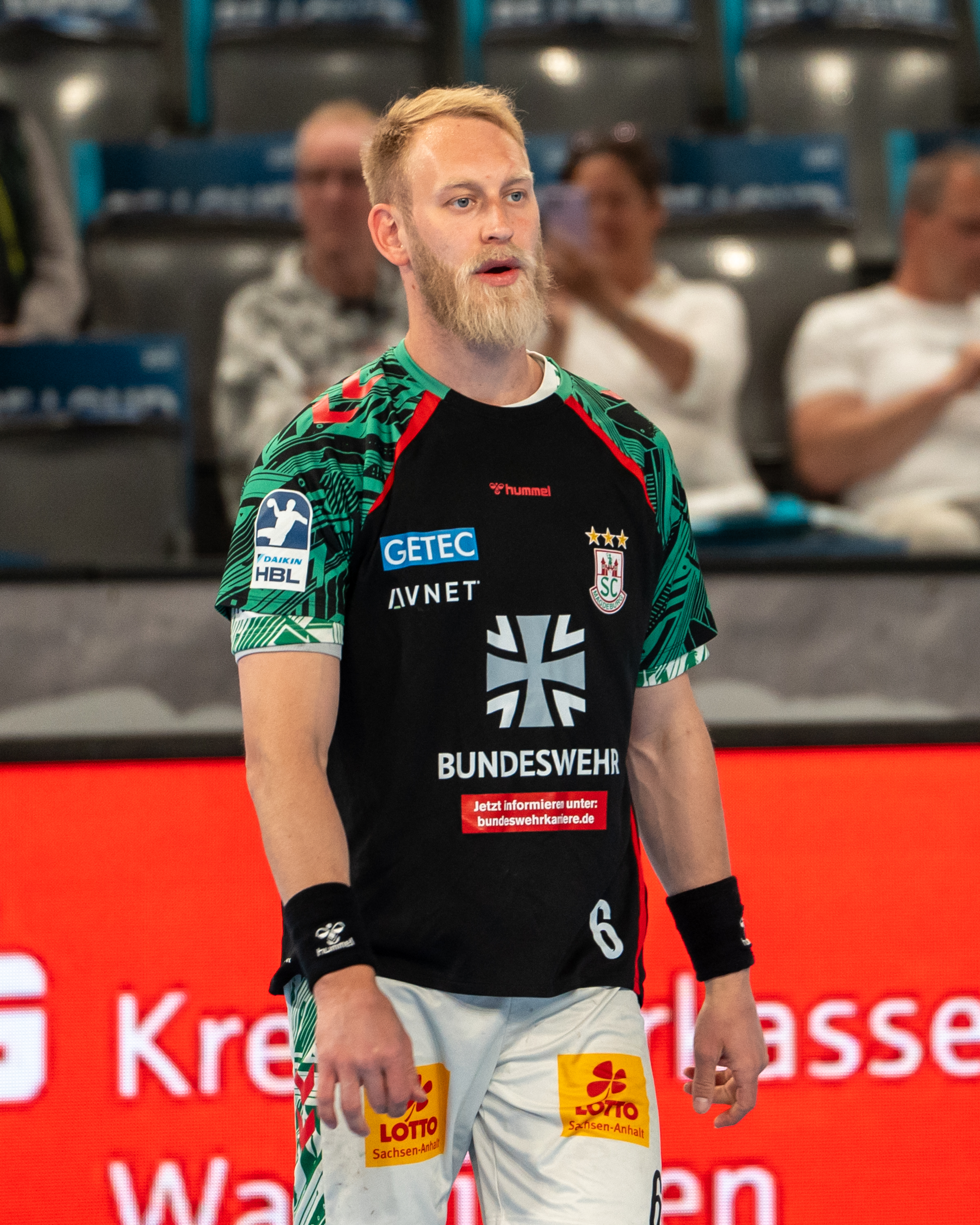

Personal information
- Nationality: German
- Born: 18 July 1992 (age 34) Magdeburg, Germany
- Height: 1.86 m (6 ft 1 in)

Sport
- Sport: Handball
- Position: Left wing
- Current club: SC Magdeburg
- Number: 6

Youth career
- Years: Team
- 1998–2000: Fermersleber SV 1895
- 2000–2008: SC Magdeburg Youngsters

Senior clubs
- Years: Team
- 2008–2011: SC Magdeburg II
- 2011–: SC Magdeburg
- 2012–2013: → SV Post Schwerin (loan)
National team
Years	Team	Apps	(Gls)
2011–	Germany	44	(74)
- Updated on 2. June 2022

Matthias Musche (born 18 July 1992) is a German handball player who plays for SC Magdeburg and the German national team.

He participated at the 2019 World Men's Handball Championship.
