= Sanne van Olphen =

Dutch handball player (born 1989)

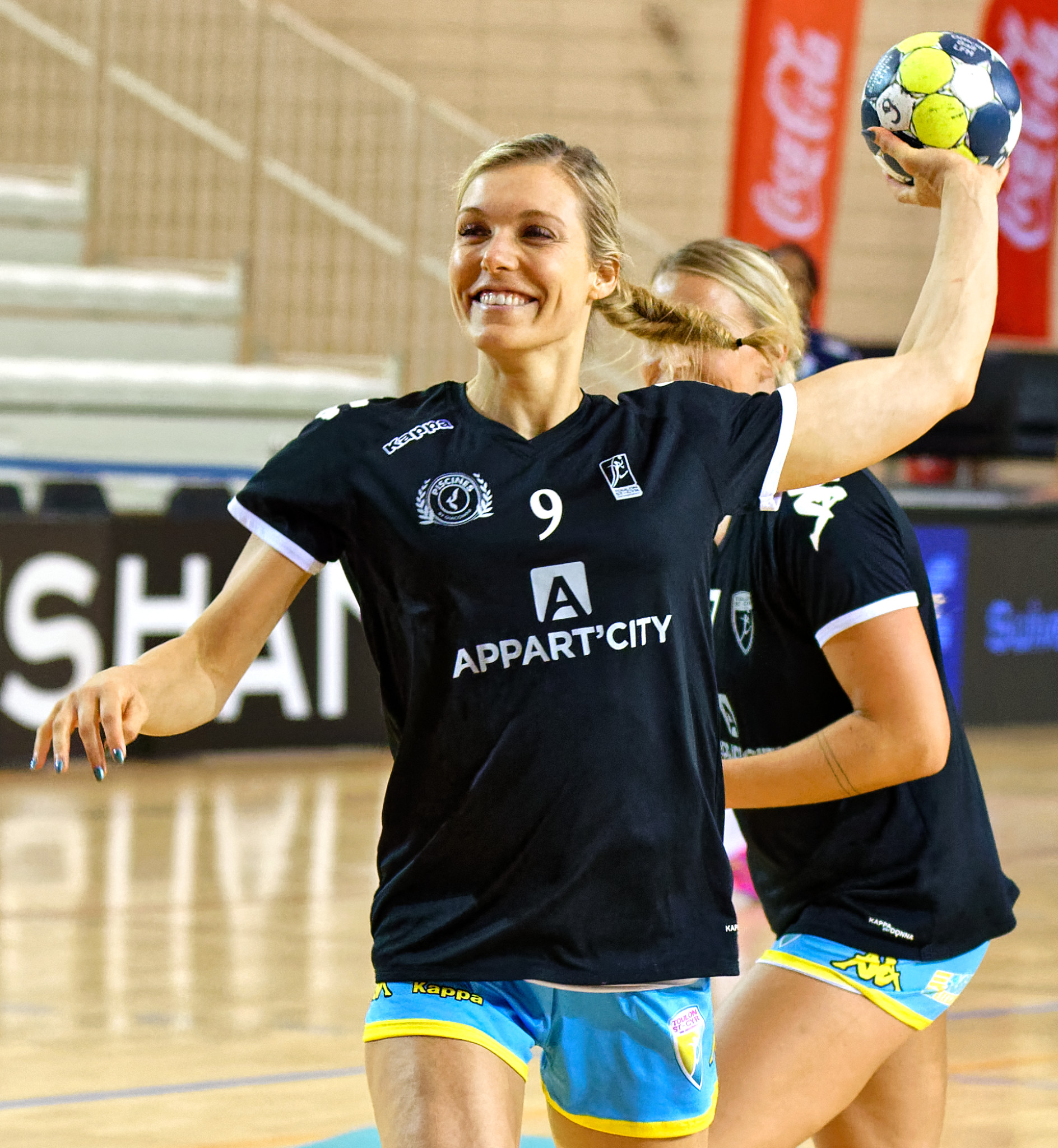

Personal information
- Nationality: Dutch
- Born: 13 March 1989 (age 37) The Hague, Netherlands
- Height: 1.77 m (5 ft 10 in)

Sport
- Sport: Handball
- Position: Right back
- Current club: Retired

Senior clubs
- Years: Team
- –2011: Omni SV Hellas
- 2011–2014: SønderjyskE Håndbold
- 2014–2017: Toulon Handball
- 2017–2018: Viborg HK
- 2019–2021: Mérignac Handball
National team
Years	Team	Apps	(Gls)
2006–2017	Netherlands	89	(141)
Medal record
World Championship
Silver medal – second place	2015 Denmark
European Championship
Silver medal – second place	2016 Sweden

Sanne van Olphen (born 13 March 1989) is a retired Dutch handball player who represented the Dutch national team.

== Career ==
Sanne van Olphen started her career at Omni SV Hellas, before joining Danish side SønderjyskE in 2011. In her first season she was promoted with the club to the Danish top division Damehåndboldligaen.

In the 2014–15 season she joined French side Toulon Saint-Cyr Var Handball.

In 2017 she returned to Denmark and joined Viborg HK. She retired after the 2017–18 season.

In the 2019–20 season she made a comeback for the French team Mérignac Handball. In 2021 she retired once again.

=== National team ===
Van Olphen played 89 games for the Netherlands national team and scored 141 goals.

She represented the Netherlands at the 2013 World Women's Handball Championship in Serbia and at the 2014 European Women's Handball Championship

She also represented Netherlands at the 2016 Olympics, where Netherlands finished 4th.

At the 2016 European Women's Handball Championship she won silver medals with the Dutch team, losing to Norway in the final.

== Private ==
Her father, Patrick van Olphen, is a former handball player and coach. She is the niece of fellow handballer Fabian van Olphen.
