= Željko Musa =

Croatian handball player (born 1986)

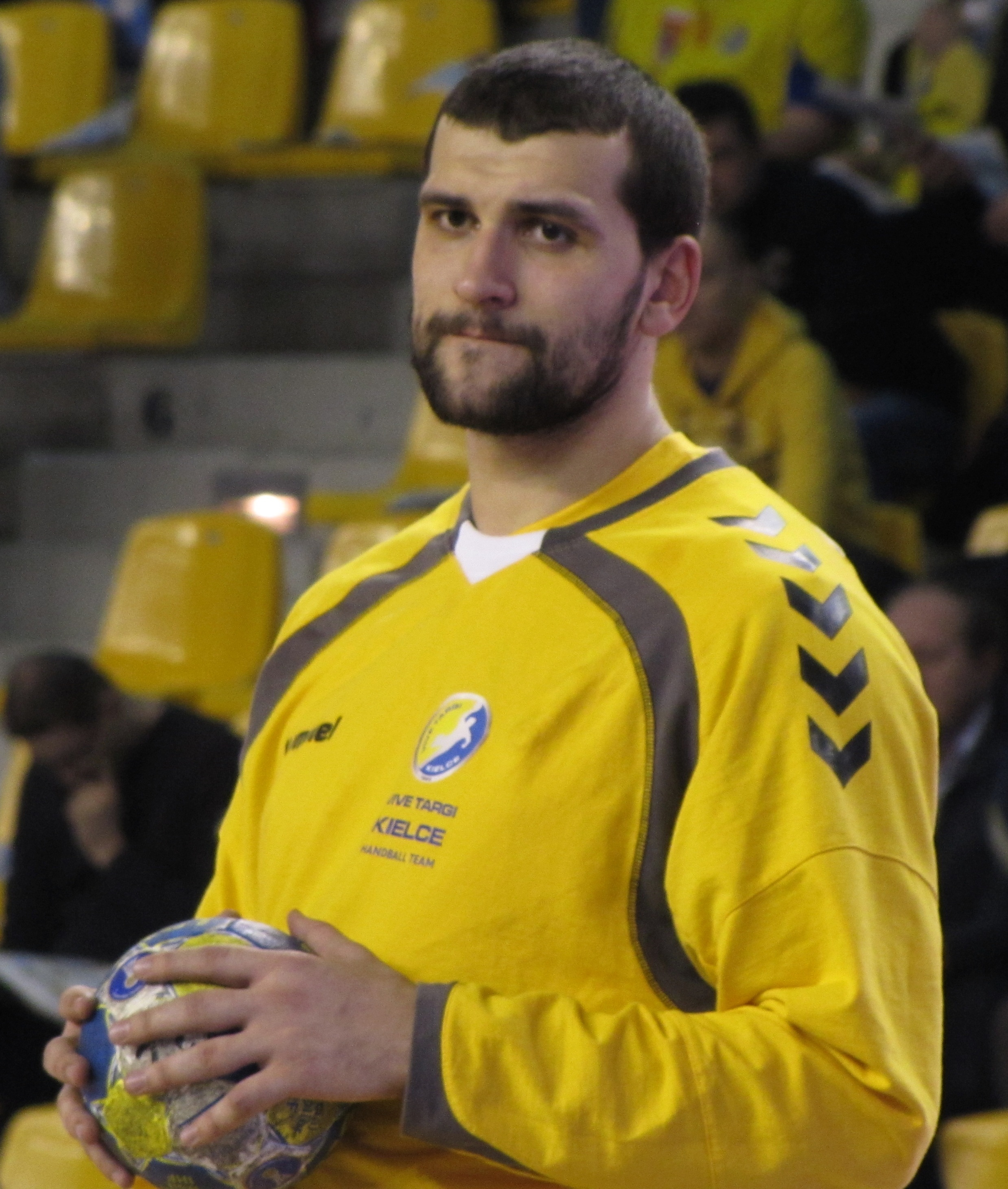

Personal information
- Nationality: Croatian
- Born: 8 January 1986 (age 40) Mostar, SFR Yugoslavia
- Height: 2.00 m (6 ft 7 in)

Sport
- Sport: Handball
- Position: Pivot

Senior clubs
- Years: Team
- 2004–2005: RK Medveščak
- 2005–2006: HRK Izviđač
- 2006–2007: RK Medveščak
- 2007–2010: RK Trimo Trebnje
- 2010–2012: RK Gorenje Velenje
- 2012–2015: Vive Targi Kielce
- 2015–2021: SC Magdeburg
- 2021–2023: RK Zagreb
- 2023–2024: HC Kriens-Luzern
National team
Years	Team	Apps	(Gls)
2008–2023	Croatia	152	(124)

Teams managed
- 2024–2025: HC Kriens-Luzern
Medal record
European Championship
Silver medal – second place	2010 Austria
Silver medal – second place	2020 Sweden/Austria/Norway
Bronze medal – third place	2012 Serbia

Željko Musa (born 8 January 1986) is a retired Croatian handball player.

== Honours ==
=== Gorenje Velenje ===
- Slovenian First League: 2011–12
- Slovenian Super Cup: 2011, 2012
