= Stefán Arnar Gunnarsson =

Icelandic handball coach (1978–2023)

Personal information
- Born: 3 March 1978 Keflavík, Iceland
- Died: c. 2 April 2023 (aged 45) Iceland

Sport
- Sport: Handball

Teams managed
- Years: Team
- 2011–2013: Selfoss
- 2014–2018: Fjölnir
- 2019–2020: HSG Krefeld
- 2020–2022: Neistin
- 2022: HK

Stefán Arnar Gunnarsson (13 March 1978 – c. 2 April 2023) was an Icelandic handball coach and player. During his career, he coached several teams in Iceland, Norway, Germany and the Faroe Islands.

== Early life ==
Born in Keflavík, Stefán Arnar grew up in Akureyri.

== Coaching career ==
Stefán Arnar was hired as the coach of Fjölnir men's team in 2014 and in 2017, he guided the team to victory in the Icelandic second-tier 1. deild karla. In October 2017, he was unexpectedly fired by Fjölnir's chairman Aðalsteinn Snorrason. Later, it turned out that Aðalsteinn did not have the board's support in the matter and Stefán Arnar was reinstated a week later. Following the season, where Fjölnir was relegated, his contract was not renewed.

He coached HSG Krefeld in Germany from 2019 to 2020. He was the coach of Neistin from 2020 to 2022 and guided the team twice to the Faroese Cup final. In February 2022, he was hired as the interim coach of HK women's team, following the firing of Halldór Harri Kristjánsson. The following season, he continued coaching HK's youth teams.

== Death ==
On 2 March 2023, Stefán Arnar was reported missing. An extensive search was conducted by the Icelandic Association for Search and Rescue, Icelandic Police and the Icelandic Coast Guard in the following weeks. On 2 April 2023, his body was found washed ashore on a beach in Reykjanesbær. Following his death, Stefán's brother, handball coach Samúel Ívar Árnason, heavily criticised family members of players for their treatment and undermining of Stefán Arnar to force preferable treatment of certain players and the HK club for his firing shortly before his death.

== Personal life ==
Stefán Arnar's stepfather was Árni J. Stefánsson, a former handball coach. Two of his brothers, Samúel Ívar Árnason and Stefán Árnason were also handball coaches.

== Achievements ==
=== Titles ===
- 1. deild karla: 2017

== See also ==
- List of solved missing person cases (2020s)
