= Árni Stefánsson =

Icelandic footballer

Personal information
- Full name: Árni Stefánsson
- Date of birth: 10 October 1953 (age 73)
- Place of birth: Akureyri, Iceland
- Position: Goalkeeper

Senior career*
Years	Team	Apps	(Gls)
1970–1973	ÍBA	?	(?)
1974–1977	Fram	54	(0)
1978–1979	Jönköpings	50	(0)
1980–1981	Landskrona	33	(0)
1982–1985	Tindastóll	?	(?)
1986	Hofsós	8	(0)
1987–1988	Neisti	15	(0)

International career
1970	Iceland U19	6	(0)
1975–1978	Iceland	15	(0)
- * Club domestic league appearances and goals

Árni Stefánsson (born 10 October 1953) is an Icelandic former footballer who played as a goalkeeper. He won 15 caps for the Iceland national football team between 1975 and 1978.

== Personal life ==
Árni's sons are handballers Samúel Ívar Árnason, Stefán Arnar Gunnarsson and Stefán Árnason.
