= Marko Bezjak =

Slovenian handball player (born 1986)

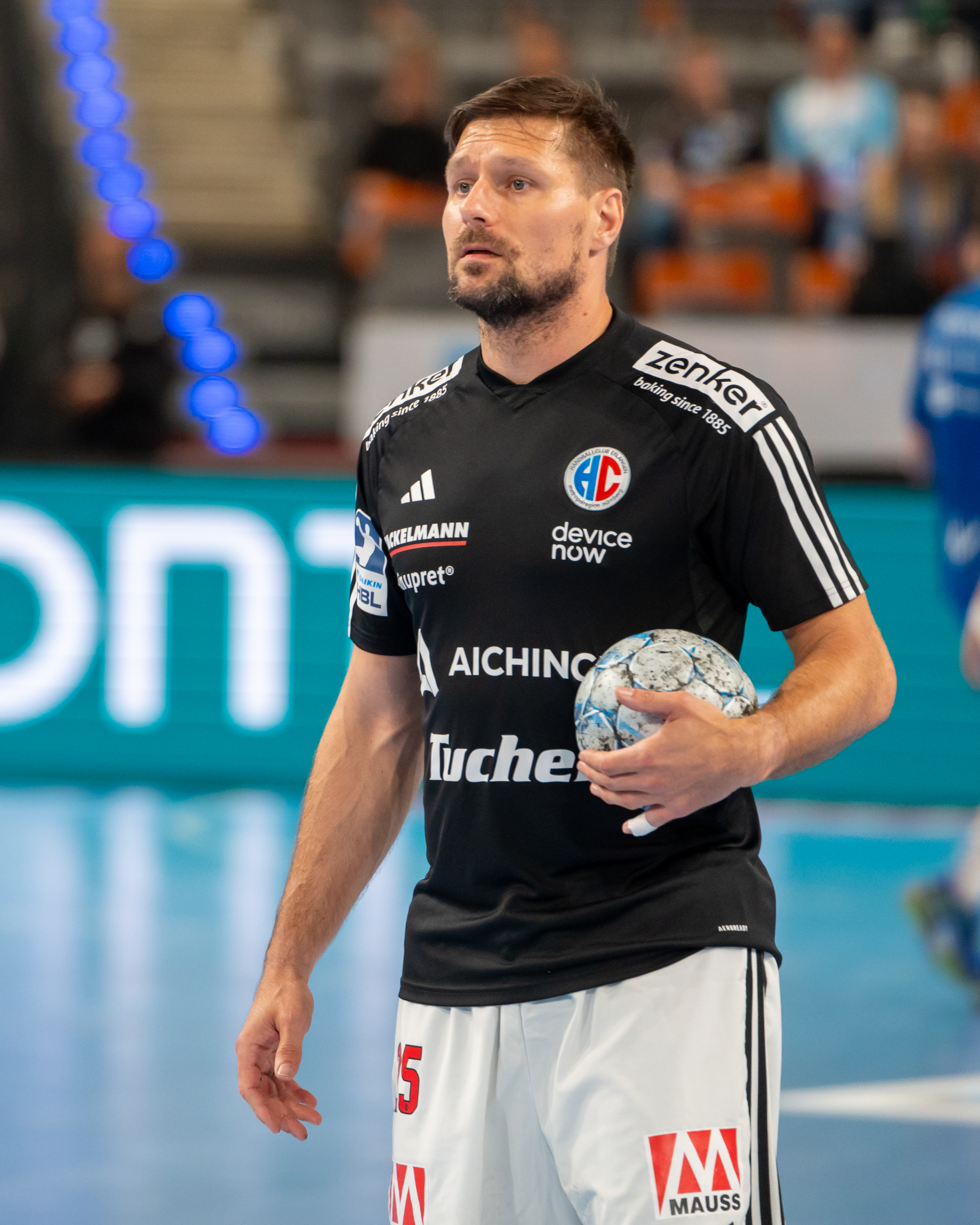
- Bezjak in 2025

Personal information
- Nationality: Slovenian
- Born: 26 June 1986 (age 40) Ptuj, SFR Yugoslavia
- Height: 1.84 m (6 ft 0 in)

Sport
- Sport: Handball
- Position: Centre back
- Current club: RK Jeruzalem Ormož (head coach)

Senior clubs
- Years: Team
- –2008: RK Jeruzalem Ormož
- 2008–2013: RK Gorenje Velenje
- 2013–2023: SC Magdeburg
- 2023–2024: RK Nexe Našice
- 2024–2025: HC Erlangen
National team
Years	Team	Apps	(Gls)
2006–2019	Slovenia	116	(209)

Teams managed
- 2025–: RK Jeruzalem Ormož
Medal record
World Championship
Bronze medal – third place	2017 France

Marko Bezjak (born 26 June 1986) is a Slovenian retired handball player. He was a member of the Slovenia national team.
