= Oskar Vind Rasmussen =

Danish handball player (born 2000)

Personal information
- Nationality: Danish
- Born: 8 August 2000 (age 26) Roskilde, Denmark
- Height: 1.90 m (6 ft 3 in)

Sport
- Sport: Handball
- Position: Right wing
- Current club: SC Magdeburg
- Number: 9

Youth career
- Years: Team
- –2019: Roskilde Håndbold

Senior clubs
- Years: Team
- 2017–2019: Roskilde Håndbold
- 2019–2022: TMS Ringsted
- 2022–2026: GOG Håndbold
- 2026–: SC Magdeburg
National team
Years	Team	Apps	(Gls)
2023–	Denmark	4	(8)
- Updated on 16 February 2026

Oskar Vind Rasmussen (born 8 August 2000) is a Danish handball player for SC Magdeburg and the Danish national team.

== Career ==
Vind Rasmussen played as a junior for Roskilde Håndbold. His last years in Roskilde he played for both their junior and senior team. In 2019 he transferred to TMS Ringsted. Since 2022 he's playing for GOG Håndbold.

He made his debut for the Danish national team on 9 March 2023, scoring one goal.

== Achievements ==
Individual awards

- All-Star Team as Best Right wing Danish League 2021–22
