= Fabian van Olphen =

Dutch handball player (born 1981)

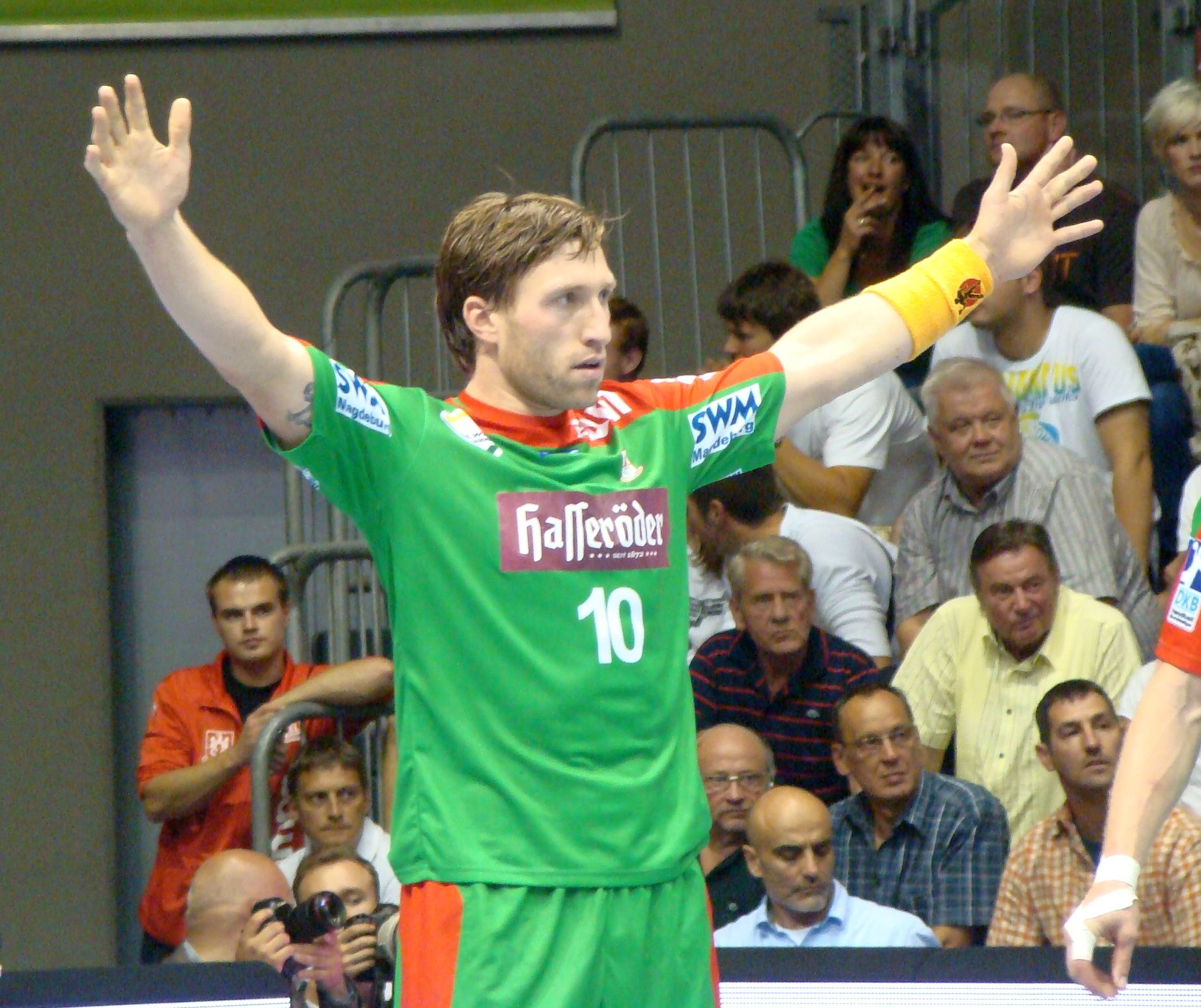

Personal information
- Nationality: Dutch
- Born: 30 March 1981 (age 45) The Hague, Netherlands
- Height: 1.94 m (6 ft 4 in)

Sport
- Sport: Handball
- Position: Left back
- Current club: Retired
- Number: 10

Senior clubs
- Years: Team
- -2001: HV Quintus
- 2001: TV Emsdetten
- 2001-2003: HV Quintus
- 2003-2006: TuS Nettelstedt-Lübbecke
- 2006-2017: SC Magdeburg
- 2017-2020: TBV Lemgo
National team
Years	Team	Apps	(Gls)
–	Netherlands	86	(344)

Fabian van Olphen (born 30 March 1981) is a Dutch retired handball player who last played for TBV Lemgo and the Netherlands national team.

== Private ==
His niece Sanne van Olphen and his brother Patrick van Olphen are also handballers.
