= Þórir Ólafsson =

Icelandic handball player (born 1979)

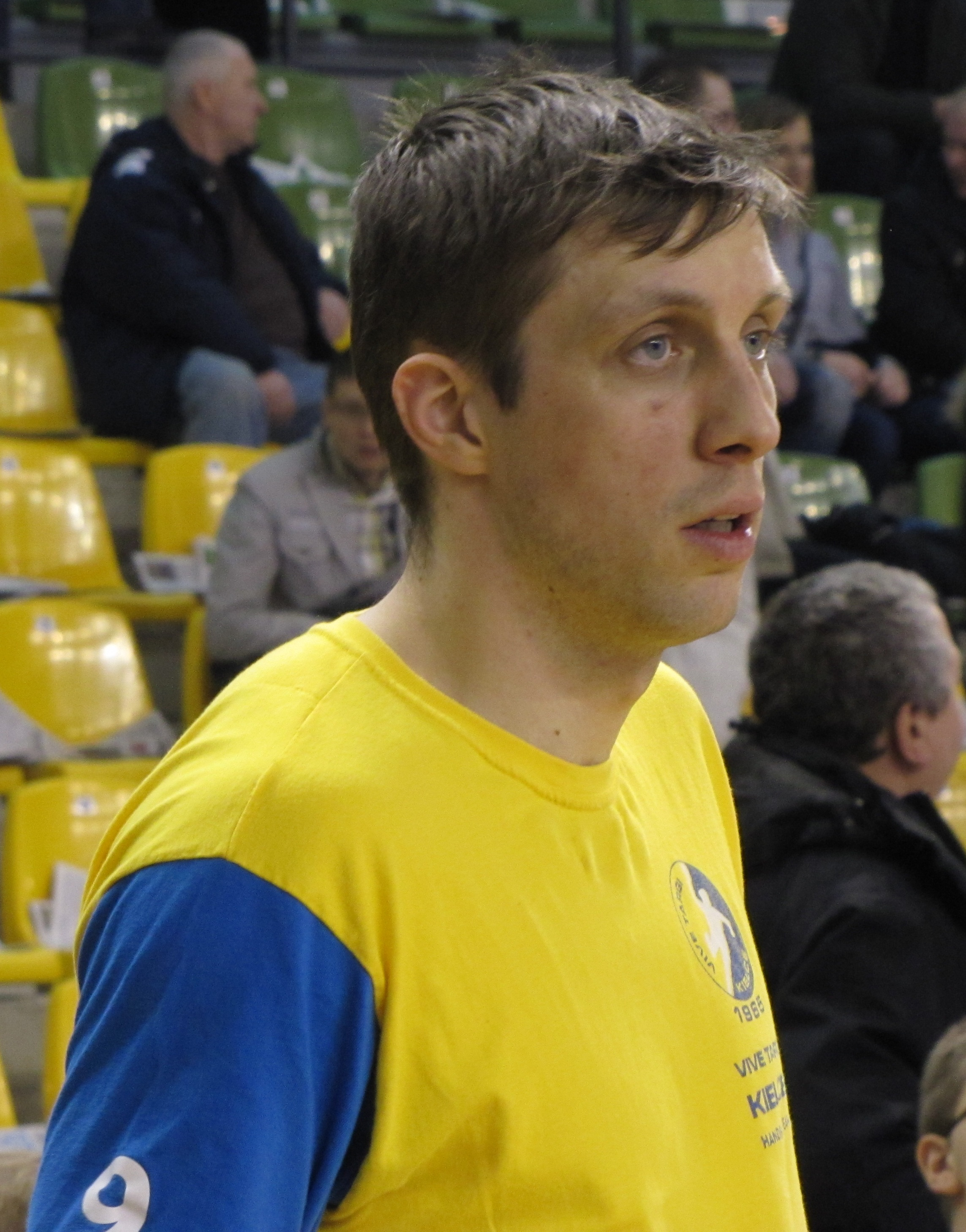

Personal information
- Nationality: Icelandic
- Born: 28 November 1979 (age 46) Selfoss, Iceland
- Height: 1.89 m (6 ft 2 in)

Sport
- Sport: Handball
- Position: Right wing

Senior clubs
- Years: Team
- –2002: Selfoss
- 2002–2005: Haukar Hafnarfjörður
- 2005–2011: TuS Nettelstedt-Lübbecke
- 2011–2014: Vive Targi Kielce
- 2014–2015: Stjarnan
- 2016: Selfoss
National team
Years	Team	Apps	(Gls)
2006–2014	Iceland	112	(277)

Teams managed
- 2022-2024: Selfoss

Þórir Ólafsson (born 28 November 1979) is an Icelandic handball coach and former player.

== Career ==
Between 1999 and 2002 he played for Selfoss, after which he joined Haukar Hafnarfjörður. Here he won the 2003, 2004 and 2005 Icelandic championship. In 2005 he joined German Bundesliga team TuS N-Lübbecke. In 2011 he joined Polish KS Kielce, where he won the 2012, 2013 and 2014 Polish Championship and Cup.

For the 2014-15 season he returned to Iceland and joined UMF Stjarnan as player-assistant-coach. After a season at Stjarnan he returned to Selfoss. From 2022 to 2024 he was also the head coach of the team.
