= Elvar Örn Jónsson =

Icelandic handball player (born 1997)

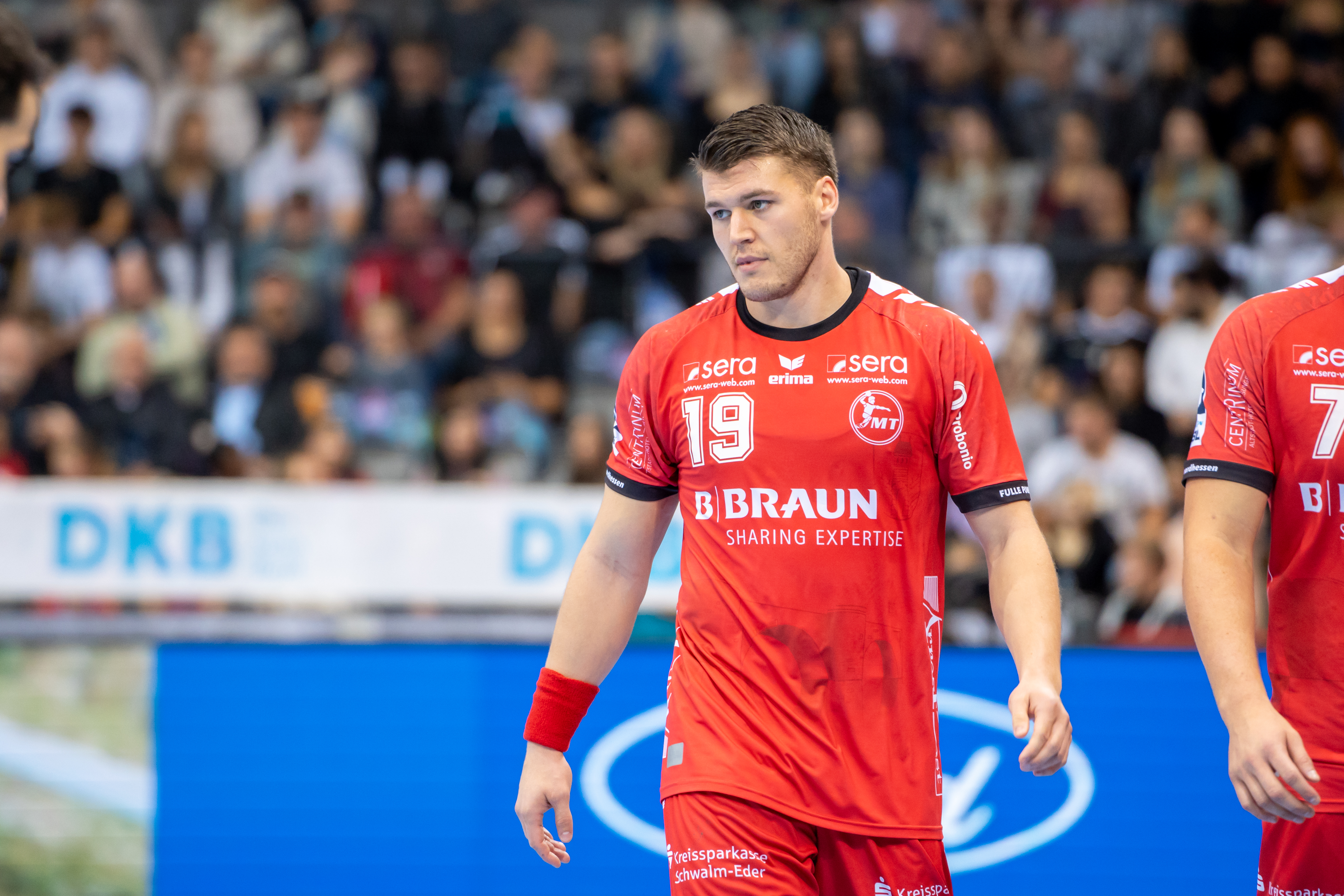
- Elvar Örn Jónsson in 2024

Personal information
- Nationality: Icelandic
- Born: 31 August 1997 (age 29) Selfoss, Iceland
- Height: 1.85 m (6 ft 1 in)

Sport
- Sport: Handball
- Position: Left back
- Current club: SC Magdeburg
- Number: 19

Youth career
- Years: Team
- 2007–2013: Selfoss

Senior clubs
- Years: Team
- 2013–2019: Selfoss
- 2019–2021: Skjern Håndbold
- 2021–2025: MT Melsungen
- 2025–: SC Magdeburg
National team
Years	Team	Apps	(Gls)
2018–	Iceland	66	(137)
- Updated on 8. January 2024

Elvar Örn Jónsson (born 31 August 1997) is an Icelandic handball player for SC Magdeburg and the Icelandic national team.

He represented Iceland at the 2019 World Men's Handball Championship. At the 2026 European Men's Handball Championship he finished 4th with Iceland, losing to Denmark in the semifinal and Croatia in the third-place playoff.
