= Selfoss (town) =

Town in southern Iceland

- Town
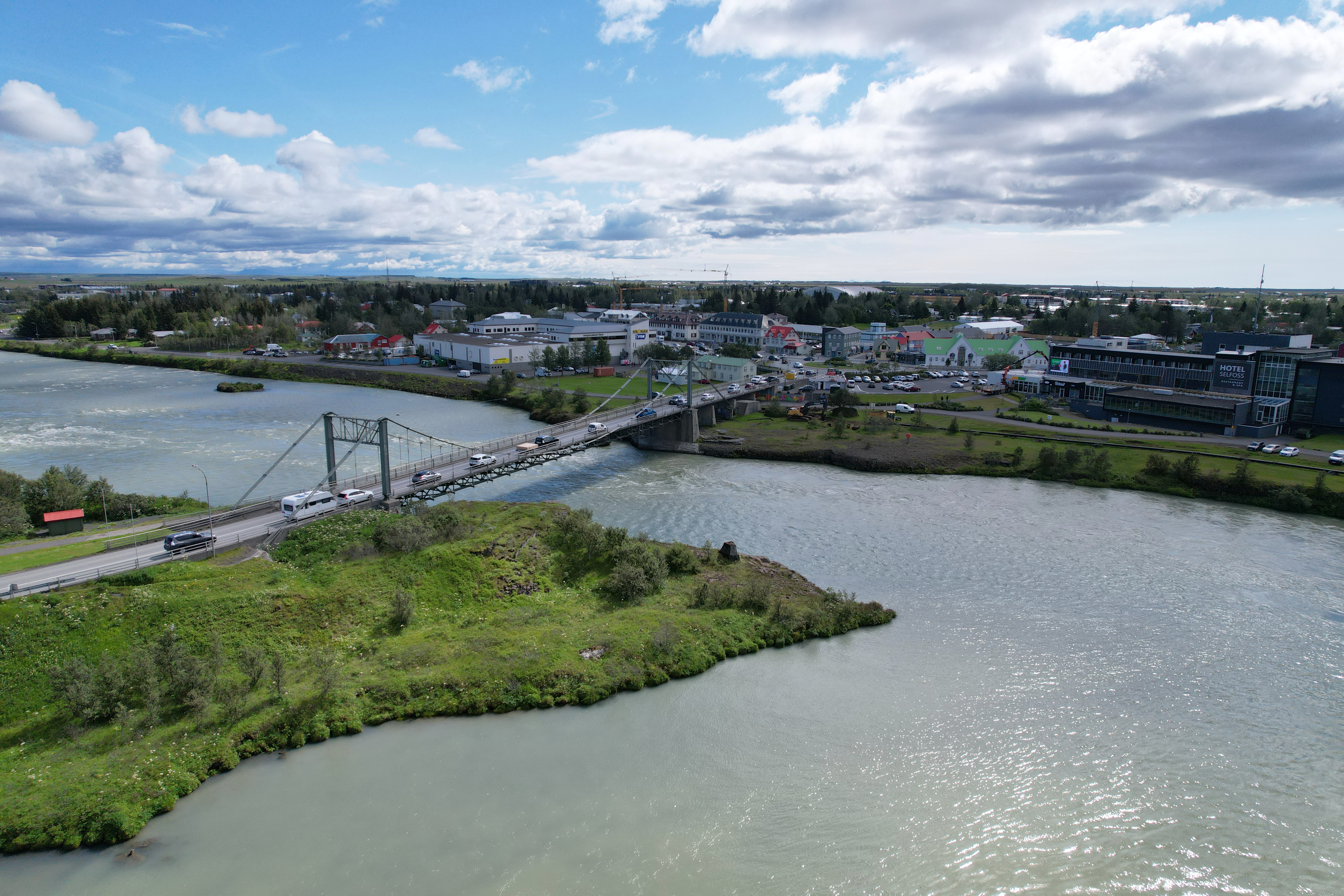
- View over Selfoss, looking over Ölfusá river

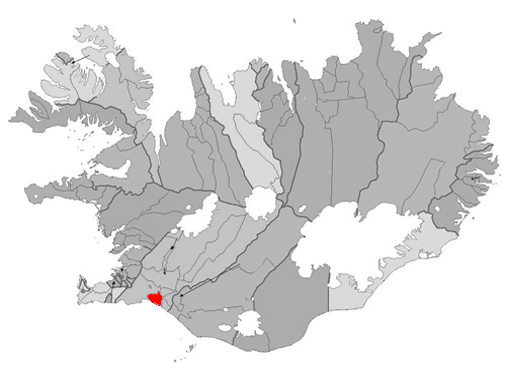
- Location of the Municipality of Árborg

- Location in Iceland
- Coordinates: 63°56′N 21°00′W
- Country: Iceland
- Constituency: South Constituency
- Region: Southern Region
- Municipality: Árborg
- First settled: 1891
- Incorporated as a municipality: 1946

Government

Population (2025)
  - Total: 10,420
- Time zone: UTC+0 (GMT)
- Postal code: 800
- Website: Official website

Selfoss (Icelandic pronunciation: [ˈsɛlˌfɔsː]) is the main town and seat of Árborg in southern Iceland. It is on the banks of the Ölfusá river, 50 kilometres (31 mi) southeast of Reykjavík. The Icelandic Route 1 runs through the town on its way between Hveragerði and Hella. The town is a centre of commerce and small industries with a population of 10,420 (2025), making it the largest residential area in South Iceland.

== History ==
=== Overview ===
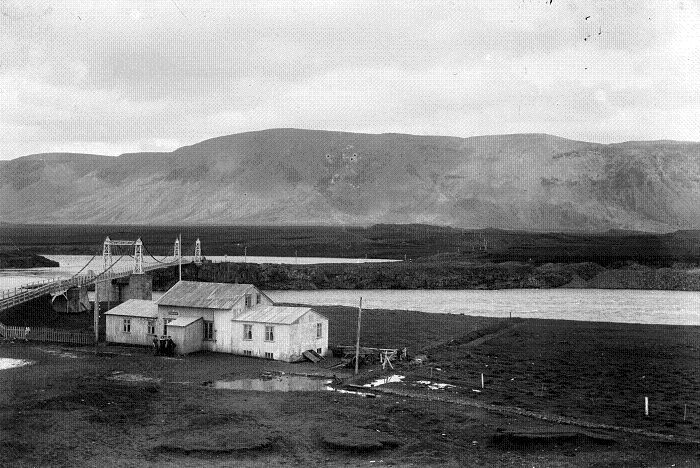
Selfoss 1918. The original Ölfusá bridge, constructed in 1891 next to Tryggvaskáli, is the oldest building in Selfoss.

Selfoss was settled by Þórir Ásason sometime after 1000, but the sagas of Icelanders mention that Ingólfur Arnarson was there during the winter of 873-74, under the Ingólfsfjall mountain, which is west of the Ölfusá river.

In the summer of 1891, due to the lobbying of Tryggvi Gunnarsson, a member of the Alþing, the first suspension bridge was built over the Ölfusá. That was a major breakthrough in Icelandic infrastructure. The current bridge was built in 1945 after the original structure collapsed. The cabin built to house workers constructing the bridge is the oldest building in Selfoss, and was named Tryggvaskáli in honor of Tryggvi for his efforts to construct the bridge. After the construction the building was used for travellers' accommodation and dining, until 1974. The building was also the site of Selfoss's first school, telephone exchange and bank.

The town of Selfoss developed as a result of the bridge, as the bridge made the town a logical centre for services for the surrounding agricultural region.

In 1900, the town was home to only 40 inhabitants, but by 1950 the population had climbed to around 1,000.

In 1931, the dairy firm Mjólkurbú Flóamanna and general store Kaupfélag Árnesinga were established. The two companies were the main employers in the area for several decades. During World War II the British stationed troops at Selfoss to guard the strategic bridge.

=== Population growth ===
Today, with more efficient transportation, Selfoss benefits from its proximity to the Reykjavík area and is predicted to grow further in the coming years as businesses and residents relocate to the town because of lower property prices. This has also led to many relocating their homes from Reykjavík to the much calmer Selfoss. The population has more than doubled from 2000 to 2025, growing from around 4,500 residents to over 10,000.

Population growth of Selfoss
Year	Population
1940	234
1950	967
1960	1,767
1970	2,397
1980	3,409
1990	3,915
2000	4,479
2005	5,267
2010	6,494
2015	6,698
2020	8,503
2025	10,420

=== 2008 earthquake ===
According to the United States Geological Survey, an earthquake with a moment magnitude of 6.3 occurred near Selfoss on the afternoon of Thursday 29 May 2008, causing considerable damage to some buildings and roads. The earthquake was felt across southern Iceland, including in the capital Reykjavík and the air base at Keflavík. At least 30 people were injured; however, there were no reports of human deaths. A number of sheep in the Selfoss area were killed.

== Present day ==
It enjoys low rates of unemployment and is the home of one of the largest colleges in the country: FSU Fjölbrautaskóli Suðurlands.

In early August, the town holds a festival called "Sumar á Selfossi", meaning "Summer in Selfoss". Local residents decorate their gardens with ribbons (coloured according to neighbourhood), and a fete is held on the public grassland behind the civic library. The fete involves the selling of homemade goods on small stalls, performances by musicians and magicians on a temporary stage, and in the evenings the revelry continues with large bonfires and a free fireworks display.

=== New town center ===
In the summer of 2021, a new pedestrianised town center was opened. It consists of reconstructions of historical buildings from all across the country and is located right across from the bridge, next to the town hall. The largest building is the reconstructed 'Old Dairy' building, a dairy processing plant constructed in 1929 and demolished in 1954, now in use as a food hall. It includes a new town square, shops, restaurants and a food hall. As a result of its success, in 2022 it was decided to expand the project with 40 new houses, including two hotels.

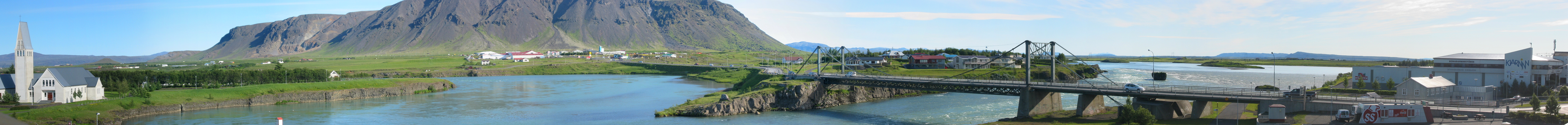
Panoramic view of Selfoss

== Sports ==
The town's biggest sports club is the UMF Selfoss multi-sport club, which was founded in 1936. In May 2019, the Selfoss men's handball team won the national handball championship for the first time. In August 2019, the women's football team added the club's second major title in one year when it won the Icelandic Football Cup. Its men's football team has played in the Icelandic leagues since 1966. The team spent two seasons in the top-tier Úrvalsdeild, in 2010 and 2012, but were relegated in both seasons.

The town also has a basketball club named Körfuknattleiksfélag Selfoss. Its men's team has had spells in the top-tier Úrvalsdeild karla. Part of the local college and the club serve as a development academy for young players that attend the school.

Since 2011, the town has hosted the Iceland's Strongest Man competition, which was initially broadcast via television channel Stöð 2. Under the Ölfusá bridge and Tryggvagarður garden have been two common locations for the events.

== Transport ==
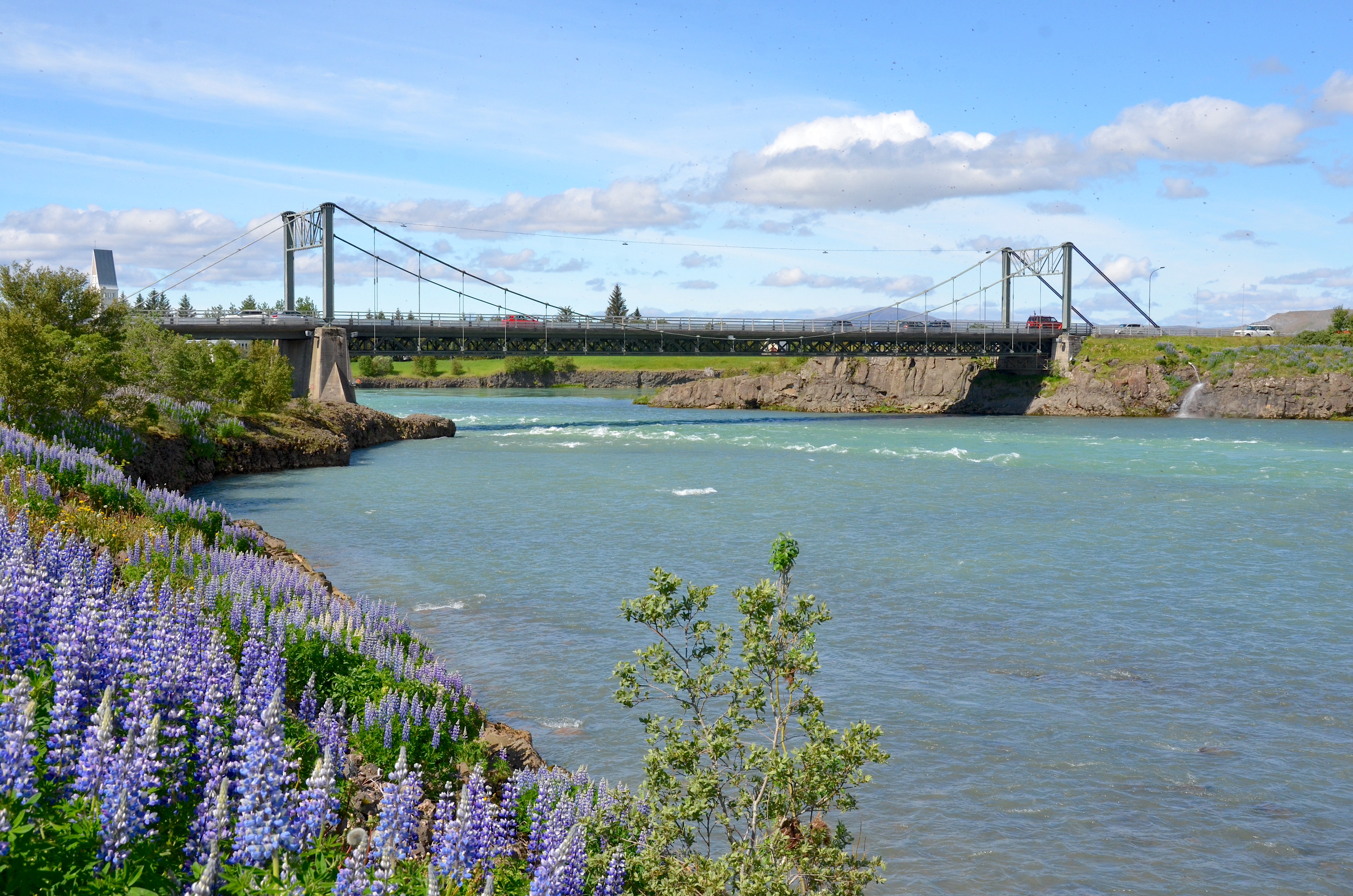
The Ölfusá bridge, reconstructed in 1945

Selfoss sits on Route 1, the Icelandic ring road, and is the first major stop east of Reykjavík. The bridge over the Ölfusá river is an important link in southern Iceland, and the genesis of the town's location. The original bridge was constructed in 1891 but collapsed when a milk truck traversed the bridge in 1944. The current Ölfusá bridge was opened a year later in December 1945.

Heavy traffic is a problem during the summer in Selfoss. The Ölfusá bridge is only a two-lane bridge and traffic is routed through the town centre. It carries practically all of the traffic to the south of the country, a significant bottleneck. This is planned to be replaced by a new bypass road and a new four-lane bridge, currently under construction and projected to be complete by 2028.

Strætó bs. operates multiple daily buses (bus numbers 51 and 52) to and from Reykjavík, as well as buses headed along route 1 towards Vík and Höfn, and also Landeyjahöfn (the new port for Vestmannaeyjar). There is also a limited service (bus numbers 72 and 73) to comparatively local destinations further inland such as Laugarvatn, Reykholt and Flúðir.

Selfoss Airport is a privately run airstrip located just to the southwest of the town.

== Geography ==
Selfoss is located about 11 km (6.8 mi) inland from the southwestern coast of Iceland, and 50 km (31 mi) from Reykjavík. It is the major town and the administrative seat of the Southern Region. The closest other towns are Eyrarbakki, Stokkseyri and Hveragerði.

=== Climate ===
Similar to the rest of the southern coast of Iceland, Selfoss has a subpolar oceanic climate (Köppen: Cfc) with cool summers and cold winters, although relatively mild for its high latitude. Precipitation is abundant year round, with October usually seeing the most precipitation.

Climate data for Reykir í Ölfusi (1972-2000), 11.8 km (7.3 mi) from Selfoss
Month	Jan	Feb	Mar	Apr	May	Jun	Jul	Aug	Sep	Oct	Nov	Dec	Year
Record high °C (°F)	14.0 (57.2)	11.7 (53.1)	16.2 (61.2)	19.2 (66.6)	19.8 (67.6)	22.6 (72.7)	28.0 (82.4)	25.5 (77.9)	18.5 (65.3)	15.1 (59.2)	11.0 (51.8)	17.8 (64.0)	28.0 (82.4)
Mean daily maximum °C (°F)	2.0 (35.6)	2.4 (36.3)	2.6 (36.7)	5.2 (41.4)	9.2 (48.6)	12.0 (53.6)	13.9 (57.0)	13.1 (55.6)	10.2 (50.4)	6.5 (43.7)	3.6 (38.5)	2.3 (36.1)	6.9 (44.5)
Daily mean °C (°F)	−0.3 (31.5)	0.2 (32.4)	0.4 (32.7)	2.5 (36.5)	6.5 (43.7)	9.4 (48.9)	11.7 (53.1)	11.1 (52.0)	7.5 (45.5)	5.2 (41.4)	1.5 (34.7)	−0.1 (31.8)	4.6 (40.4)
Mean daily minimum °C (°F)	−2.8 (27.0)	−2.3 (27.9)	−2.2 (28.0)	0.1 (32.2)	3.7 (38.7)	6.5 (43.7)	8.5 (47.3)	8.2 (46.8)	5.2 (41.4)	2.2 (36.0)	−0.7 (30.7)	−2.4 (27.7)	2.0 (35.6)
Record low °C (°F)	−19.7 (−3.5)	−19.3 (−2.7)	−18.9 (−2.0)	−18.8 (−1.8)	−8.2 (17.2)	−3.0 (26.6)	0.5 (32.9)	−1.2 (29.8)	−6.4 (20.5)	−14.9 (5.2)	−17.9 (−0.2)	−19.8 (−3.6)	−19.8 (−3.6)
Average precipitation mm (inches)	94.2 (3.71)	96.4 (3.80)	95.4 (3.76)	81.7 (3.22)	65.6 (2.58)	78.2 (3.08)	71.8 (2.83)	101.9 (4.01)	100.1 (3.94)	119.9 (4.72)	103.5 (4.07)	104.8 (4.13)	1,113.5 (43.85)
Average precipitation days (≥ 0.1 mm)	17.7	16.8	18.4	16.8	15.2	16.2	16.1	16.9	16.8	18.8	16.1	18.1	203.9
Mean monthly sunshine hours	21.9	47.5	101.0	139.8	161.6	152.8	144.6	122.0	112.2	79.8	42.1	15.0	1,140.3
Source 1: Icelandic Met Office (extremes 1957-2015 for Eyrarbakki-11 km (7 mi) from Selfoss)
Source 2: Icelandic Met Office (precipitation 1961-90 for Lækjarbakki precipitation station in the town of Selfoss, precipitation days 1961-90 for Forsæti-17 km (10 mi) from Selfoss)

== Notable people ==
- Guðni Ágústsson, politician
- Guðmundur Þórarinsson, footballer
- Vésteinn Hafsteinsson, former discus thrower and a coach
- Bjarni Harðarson, politician, writer, and bookseller
- Jón Arnar Magnússon, former decathlete
- Ómar Ingi Magnússon (born 1997), handballer, was born in Selfoss
- Elvar Örn Jónsson (born 1997), handballer, was born in Selfoss
- Davíð Oddsson, politician was brought up in Selfoss
- Björgvin G. Sigurðsson, politician
- Thorir Hergeirsson, handball coach for the Norway women's national handball team
- Þórir Ólafsson, handballer
- Gunnar Ólason, a member of the band Skítamórall
- Björk, singer, lived in Selfoss as a child
- Jón Daði Böðvarsson, footballer, was born in Selfoss
- Daði Freyr, musician, was raised in the area of Selfoss

== See also ==
- List of cities in Iceland
- Laugardælir, closest town to Selfoss
- Bobby Fischer Center, museum in Selfoss
