= Wolfgang Lakenmacher =

German handball player (1943–2023)

Wolfgang Lakenmacher (8 October 1943 – 24 May 2023) was an East German handball player who competed in the 1972 Summer Olympics. In 1972 he was part of the East German team which finished fourth in the Olympic tournament. He played all six matches and scored eleven goals. Lakenmacher was the father of Sven Lakenmacher who competed with the German handball team at the 2000 Summer Olympics. Lakenmacher died on 24 May 2023, at the age of 79.

== Sources ==
- Wolfgang Lakenmacher's profile at Sports Reference.com
