= Sven Lakenmacher =

German handball player (born 1971)

Personal information
- Nationality: Germany
- Born: 26 May 1971 (age 55) Magdeburg, East Germany
- Height: 182 cm (72 in)

Sport
- Sport: Handball

Senior clubs
- Years: Team
- ?-?: TuS N-Lübbecke
National team
Years	Team	Apps	(Gls)
?-?	Germany	47	(93)

Sven Lakenmacher (born 26 May 1971) is a former East German and German male handball player. He was a member of the Germany men's national handball team. He was part of the team at the 2000 Summer Olympics, playing two matches. On club level he played for TuS N-Lübbecke in Lübbecke.

His father was handball player Wolfgang Lakenmacher, who competed for East Germany at the 1972 Summer Olympics.
