= Handball at the 2000 Summer Olympics =

- Handball pictogram

Tournament details
- Host country: Australia
- Venue: The Dome and Exthibition Complex
- Dates: 16 September – 1 October 2000
- Teams: 22 (from 5 confederations)

Final positions
- Champions: Russia (Men); Denmark (Women)
- Runners-up: Sweden (Men); Hungary (Women)
- Third place: Spain (Men); Norway (Women)
- Fourth place: Yugoslavia (Men); South Korea (Women)

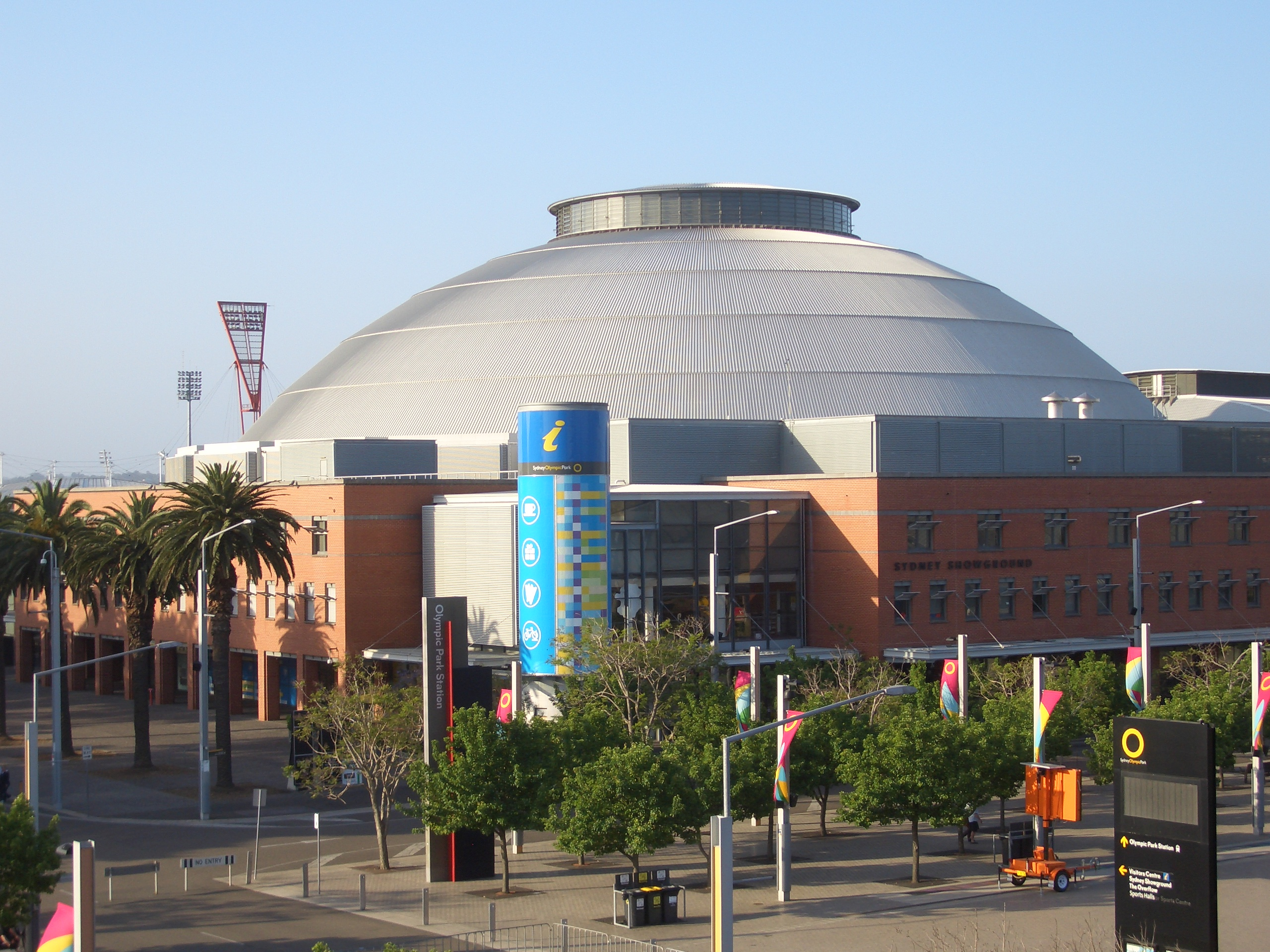
The Dome and Exhibition Complex hosted the Handball finals

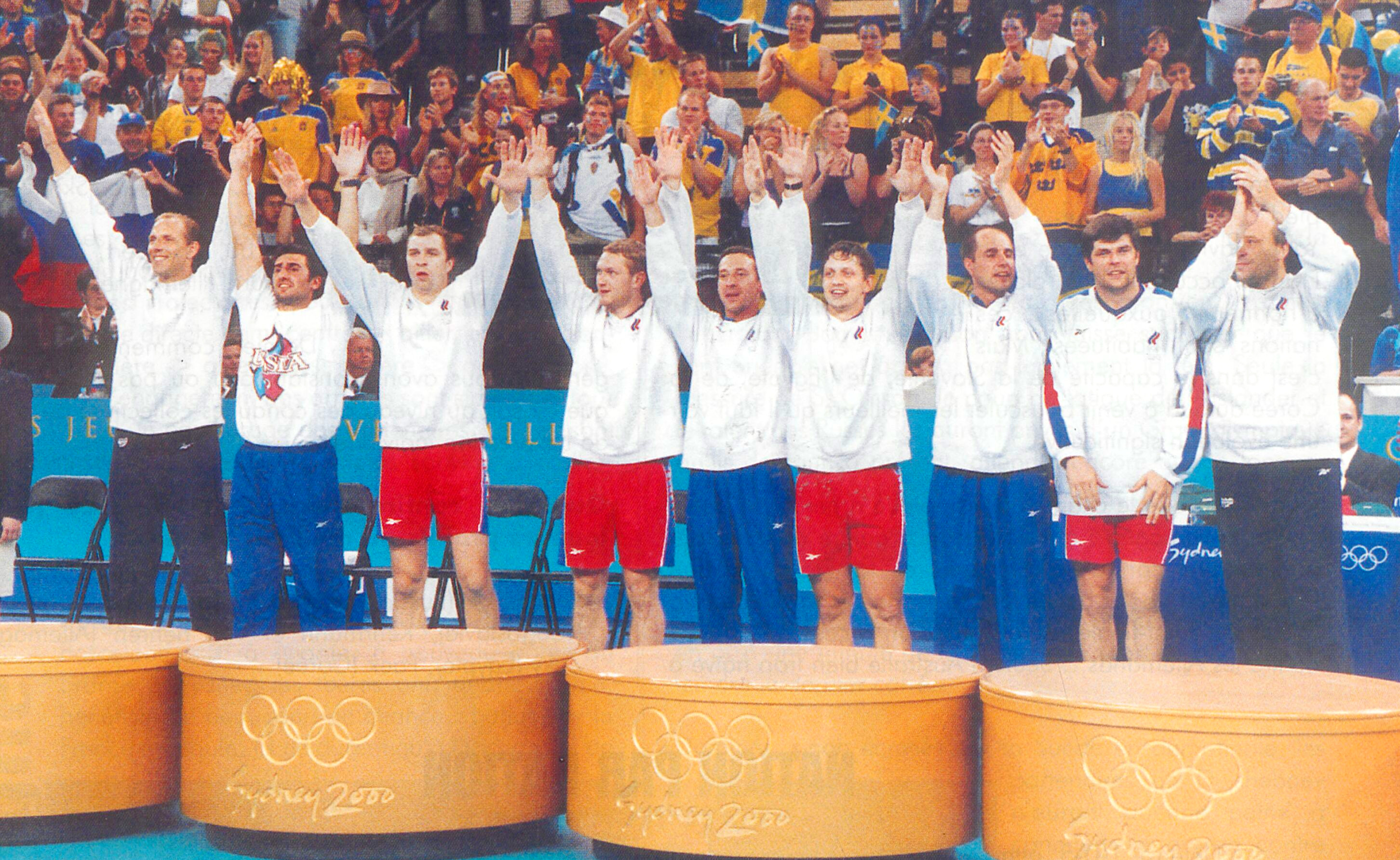
Russia won gold

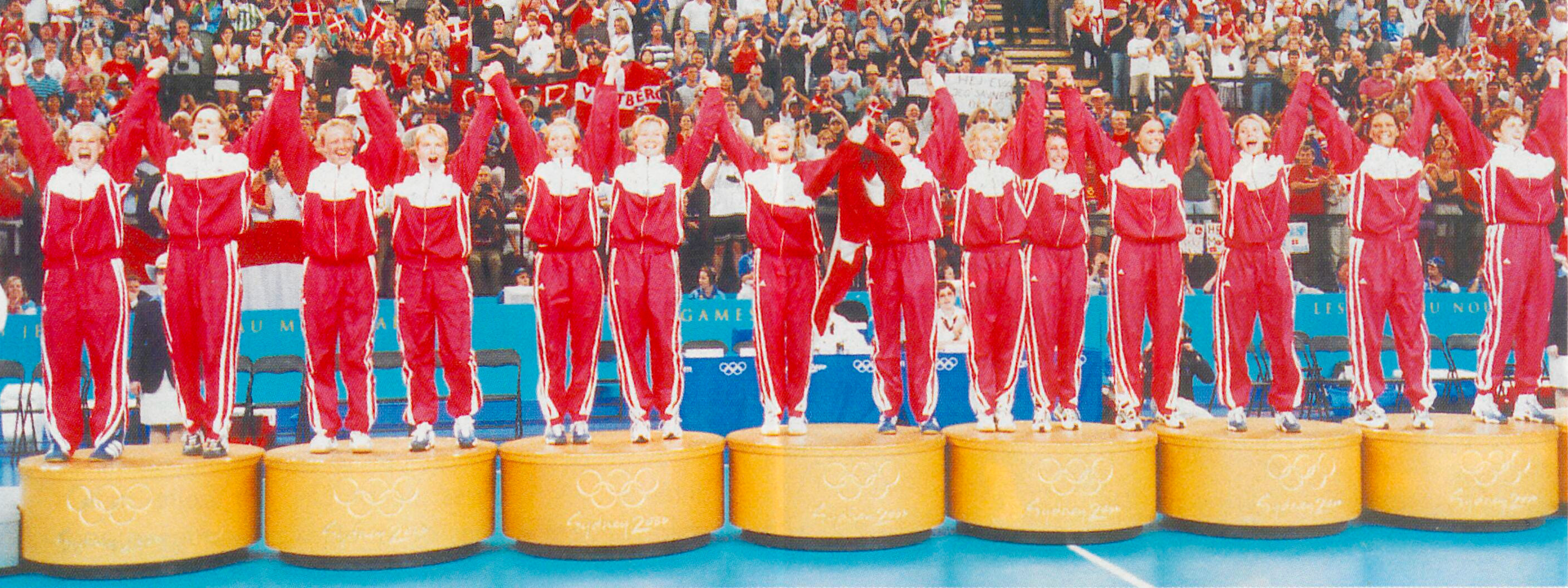
Denmark won gold

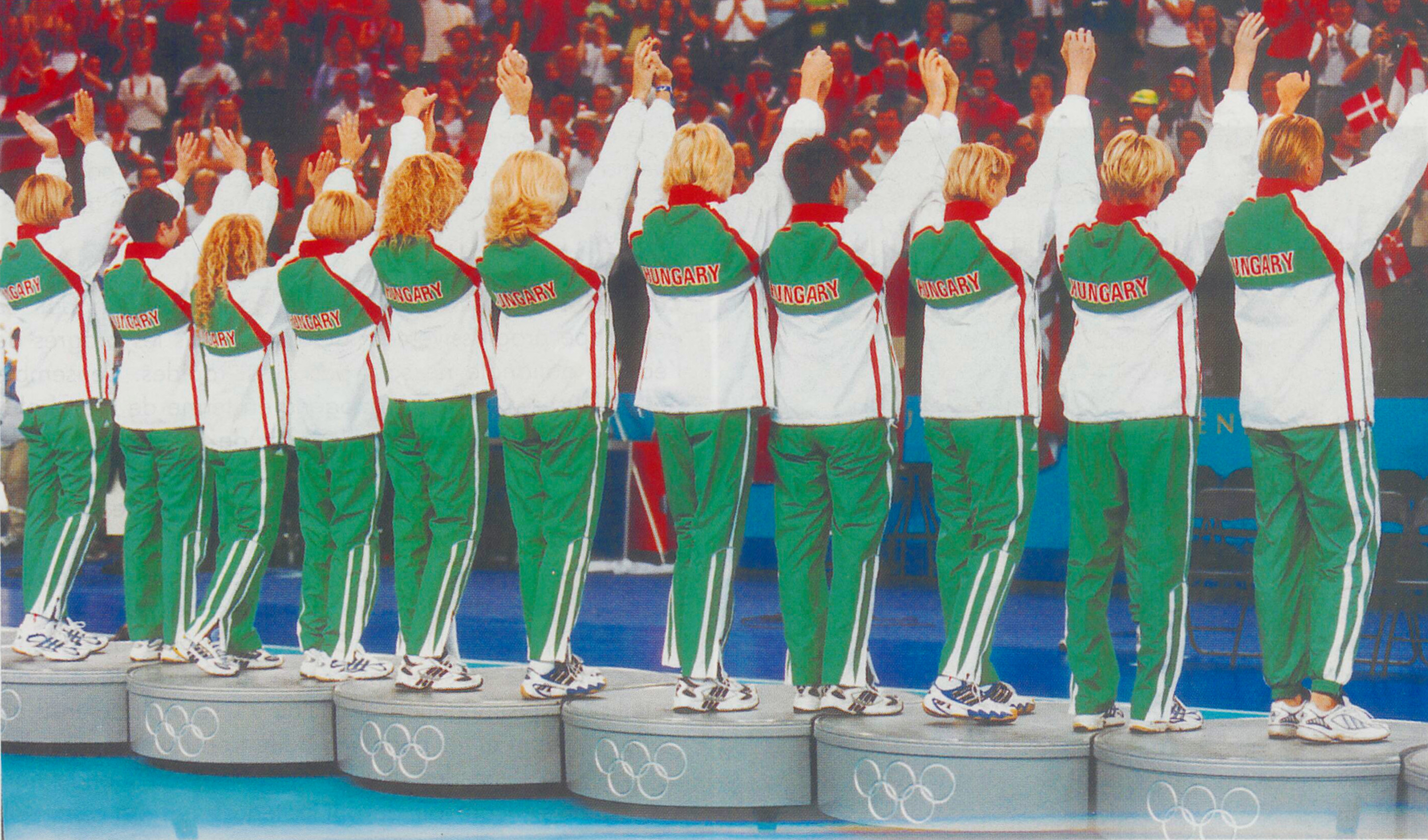
Hungary won silver

Final results for the Team Handball competition at the 2000 Summer Olympics:

== Medal summary ==
| Event | Gold | Silver | Bronze |
|---|---|---|---|
| Men | Russia; Dmitry Filippov; Vyacheslav Gorpishin; Oleg Khodkov; Eduard Koksharov; Denis Krivoshlykov; Vasily Kudinov; Stanislav Kulinchenko; Dmitry Kuzelev; Andrey Lavrov; Igor Lavrov; Sergey Pogorelov; Pavel Sukosyan; Dmitri Torgovanov; Aleksandr Tuchkin; Lev Voronin | Sweden; Magnus Andersson; Martin Boquist; Martin Frändesjö; Mathias Franzén; Peter Gentzel; Andreas Larsson; Ola Lindgren; Stefan Lövgren; Staffan Olsson; Johan Petersson; Tomas Svensson; Tomas Sivertsson; Pierre Thorsson; Ljubomir Vranjes; Magnus Wislander | Spain; David Barrufet; Talant Duyshebaev; Mateo Garralda; Rafael Guijosa; Demetrio Lozano; Enric Masip; Jordi Núñez; Jesús Olalla; Juan Pérez; Xavier O'Callaghan; Antonio Carlos Ortega; Antonio Ugalde; Iñaki Urdangarín; Alberto Urdiales; Andrei Xepkin |
| Women | Denmark; Lene Rantala; Camilla Andersen; Tina Bøttzau; Janne Kolling; Tonje Kjærgaard; Karen Brødsgaard; Katrine Fruelund; Maja Grønbæk; Christina Hansen; Anette Hoffmann; Lotte Kiærskou; Karin Mortensen; Anja Nielsen; Rikke Petersen; Mette Vestergaard | Hungary; Beatrix Balogh; Rita Deli; Ágnes Farkas; Andrea Farkas; Anikó Kántor; Beatrix Kökény; Anita Kulcsár; Dóra Lőwy; Anikó Nagy; Ildikó Pádár; Katalin Pálinger; Krisztina Pigniczki; Bojana Radulovics; Judith Simics; Beáta Siti | Norway; Kristine Duvholt; Trine Haltvik; Heidi Tjugum; Susann Goksør Bjerkrheim; Ann Cathrin Eriksen; Kjersti Grini; Elisabeth Hilmo; Mia Hundvin; Tonje Larsen; Cecilie Leganger; Jeanette Nilsen; Marianne Rokne; Birgitte Sættem; Monica Sandve; Else-Marthe Sørlie |

== See also ==
- Handball at the 2000 Summer Olympics – Men's tournament
- Handball at the 2000 Summer Olympics – Women's tournament
