= Handball at the 2004 Summer Olympics – Men's tournament =

2004 Men's Olympic handball tournament
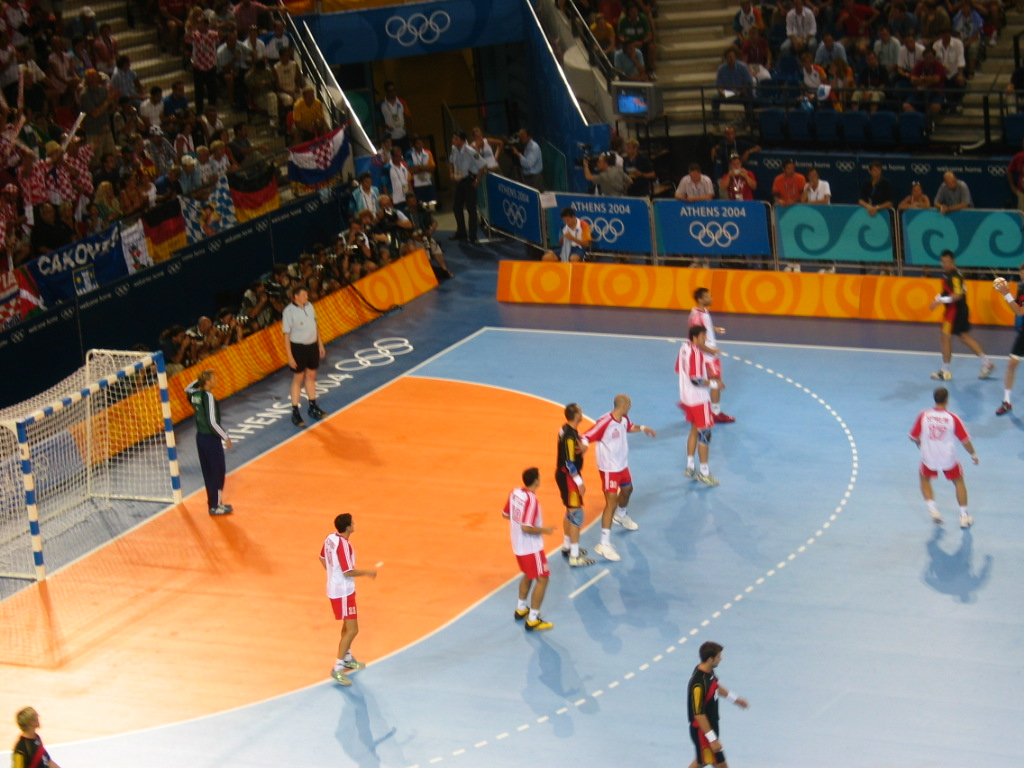
- Final: Croatia - Germany

Tournament details
- Host country: Greece
- Venues: 2 (in 1 host city)
- Dates: 14–29 August 2004
- Teams: 12 (from 4 confederations)

Final positions
- Champions: Croatia (2nd title)
- Runners-up: Germany
- Third place: Russia
- Fourth place: Hungary

Tournament statistics
- Matches played: 44
- Goals scored: 2,355 (53.52 per match)
- Top scorer(s): (South Korea) Yoon Kyung-shin (58 goals)

Awards
- Best player: (Croatia) Ivano Balić

The men's handball competition, one of two events of handball at the 2004 Summer Olympics, in Athens, took place at the Sports Pavilion (Faliro Coastal Zone Olympic Complex) during the preliminary round and quarter-finals (August 14–August 24), and at the Helliniko Olympic Indoor Arena during the semi-finals and medal matches (August 27–August 29). A total of 180 players, distributed among twelve national teams, participated in this tournament.

== Medalists ==
Gold	Silver	Bronze
Croatia Venio Losert; Vlado Šola; Valter Matošević; Nikša Kaleb; Ivano Balić; Blaženko Lacković; Vedran Zrnić; Igor Vori; Davor Dominiković; Mirza Džomba; Drago Vuković; Slavko Goluža; Goran Šprem; Denis Špoljarić; Petar Metličić	Germany Henning Fritz; Christian Ramota; Pascal Hens; Mark Dragunski; Stefan Kretzschmar; Jan Olaf Immel; Christian Schwarzer; Klaus-Dieter Petersen; Volker Zerbe; Markus Baur; Christian Zeitz; Torsten Jansen; Daniel Stephan; Florian Kehrmann; Frank von Behren	Russia Andrey Lavrov; Alexey Kostygov; Vitali Ivanov; Oleg Kuleshov; Denis Krivoshlykov; Aleksandr Tuchkin; Vasily Kudinov; Pavel Bashkin; Dmitri Torgovanov; Alexander Gorbatikov; Alexey Rastvortsev; Vyacheslav Gorpishin; Sergey Pogorelov; Mikhail Chipurin; Eduard Koksharov

== Qualification ==
Mean of qualification	Date	Host	Vacancies	Qualified
Host nation	5 September 1997	(Switzerland) Lausanne	1	Greece
2003 World Championship	20 January – 2 February 2003	Portugal	7	Croatia; Germany; France; Spain; Russia; Hungary; Iceland
2003 Pan American Games	2–11 August 2003	(Dominican Republic) Santo Domingo	1	Brazil
African qualification tournament	16–20 September 2003	(Angola) Luanda	1	Egypt
Asian qualification tournament	23–28 September 2003	Japan	1	South Korea
2004 European Championship	22 January – 1 February 2004	Slovenia	1	Slovenia
Total			12	

== Preliminary round ==
For the preliminary round, contested between August 14 and August 22, the twelve teams were distributed into two groups of six teams. Each team played against each of its five group opponents for a total of five matches. The four best-scoring teams advanced to the quarter-finals.

All times are local (UTC+3).

=== Group A ===
Pos	Team	Pld	W	D	L	GF	GA	GD	Pts	Qualification
1	Croatia	5	5	0	0	146	129	+17	10	Quarterfinals
2	Spain	5	4	0	1	154	137	+17	8	Quarterfinals
3	South Korea	5	2	0	3	148	148	0	4 (Note: South Korea 35–32 Russia)	Quarterfinals
4	Russia	5	2	0	3	145	145	0	4	Quarterfinals
5	Iceland	5	1	0	4	143	158	−15	2 (Note: Iceland 30–25 Slovenia)	
6	Slovenia	5	1	0	4	130	149	−19	2	

Rules for classification: 1) Points; 2) Head-to-head points; 3) Head-to-head goal difference; 4) Head-to-head goals scored; 5) Goal difference; 6) Goals scored; 7) Draw.
Notes:

14 August 2004; 09:30	Spain	31–30	South Korea	Sports Pavilion, Athens; Referees: Bavas, Migas (GRE)
14 August 2004; 09:30	García 6	(17–12)	Paek, Yoon Kyung-s. 6	Sports Pavilion, Athens; Referees: Bavas, Migas (GRE)
14 August 2004; 09:30	3× (yellow card) 8× (suspension) 1× (red card)		4× (yellow card) 3× (suspension) 1× (red card)	Sports Pavilion, Athens; Referees: Bavas, Migas (GRE)

14 August 2004; 14:30	Russia	28–25	Slovenia	Sports Pavilion, Athens; Referees: Bord, Buy (FRA)
14 August 2004; 14:30	Koksharov 9	(16–13)	three players 4	Sports Pavilion, Athens; Referees: Bord, Buy (FRA)
14 August 2004; 14:30	2× (yellow card) 8× (suspension) 1× (red card)		3× (yellow card) 9× (suspension)	Sports Pavilion, Athens; Referees: Bord, Buy (FRA)

14 August 2004; 19:30	Croatia	34–30	Iceland	Sports Pavilion, Athens; Referees: Lemme, Ullrich (GER)
14 August 2004; 19:30	Metličić 8	(16–12)	Stefánsson 8	Sports Pavilion, Athens; Referees: Lemme, Ullrich (GER)
14 August 2004; 19:30	3× (yellow card) 9× (suspension)		3× (yellow card) 7× (suspension) 1× (red card)	Sports Pavilion, Athens; Referees: Lemme, Ullrich (GER)

16 August 2004; 09:30	South Korea	35–32	Russia	Sports Pavilion, Athens; Referees: Hansson, Olsson (SWE)
16 August 2004; 09:30	Lee J., Yoon Kyung-s. 7	(16–16)	Koksharov 6	Sports Pavilion, Athens; Referees: Hansson, Olsson (SWE)
16 August 2004; 09:30	3× (yellow card) 2× (suspension)		3× (yellow card) 2× (suspension)	Sports Pavilion, Athens; Referees: Hansson, Olsson (SWE)

16 August 2004; 11:30	Slovenia	26–27	Croatia	Sports Pavilion, Athens; Referees: Øie, Togstad (NOR)
16 August 2004; 11:30	Brumen 10	(10–13)	Vori 8	Sports Pavilion, Athens; Referees: Øie, Togstad (NOR)
16 August 2004; 11:30	3× (yellow card) 7× (suspension) 2× (red card)		3× (yellow card) 7× (suspension) 1× (red card)	Sports Pavilion, Athens; Referees: Øie, Togstad (NOR)

16 August 2004; 14:30	Iceland	23–31	Spain	Sports Pavilion, Athens; Referees: Bord, Buy (FRA)
16 August 2004; 14:30	Stefánsson 6	(12–13)	Duyshebaev, Romero 5	Sports Pavilion, Athens; Referees: Bord, Buy (FRA)
16 August 2004; 14:30	2× (yellow card) 3× (suspension)		3× (yellow card) 3× (suspension)	Sports Pavilion, Athens; Referees: Bord, Buy (FRA)

18 August 2004; 09:30	Croatia	29–26	South Korea	Sports Pavilion, Athens; Referees: Bord, Buy (FRA)
18 August 2004; 09:30	Džomba 9	(12–10)	Yoon Kyung-s. 8	Sports Pavilion, Athens; Referees: Bord, Buy (FRA)
18 August 2004; 09:30	3× (yellow card) 6× (suspension)		3× (yellow card) 3× (suspension)	Sports Pavilion, Athens; Referees: Bord, Buy (FRA)

18 August 2004; 11:30	Iceland	30–25	Slovenia	Sports Pavilion, Athens; Referees: Baum, Góralczyk (POL)
18 August 2004; 11:30	G. Sigurðsson 7	(10–10)	Rutenka 10	Sports Pavilion, Athens; Referees: Baum, Góralczyk (POL)
18 August 2004; 11:30	3× (yellow card) 3× (suspension)		3× (yellow card) 3× (suspension)	Sports Pavilion, Athens; Referees: Baum, Góralczyk (POL)

18 August 2004; 19:30	Spain	29–26	Russia	Sports Pavilion, Athens; Referees: Nachevski, Nachevski (MKD)
18 August 2004; 19:30	three players 5	(11–11)	Rastvortsev 6	Sports Pavilion, Athens; Referees: Nachevski, Nachevski (MKD)
18 August 2004; 19:30	3× (yellow card) 6× (suspension)		3× (yellow card) 7× (suspension) 1× (red card)	Sports Pavilion, Athens; Referees: Nachevski, Nachevski (MKD)

20 August 2004; 09:30	South Korea	34–30	Iceland	Sports Pavilion, Athens; Referees: Nachevski, Nachevski (MKD)
20 August 2004; 09:30	Yoon Kyung-s. 12	(16–13)	Stefánsson 10	Sports Pavilion, Athens; Referees: Nachevski, Nachevski (MKD)
20 August 2004; 09:30	3× (yellow card) 4× (suspension)		3× (yellow card) 3× (suspension) 1× (red card)	Sports Pavilion, Athens; Referees: Nachevski, Nachevski (MKD)

20 August 2004; 11:30	Spain	41–28	Slovenia	Sports Pavilion, Athens; Referees: Lemme, Ullrich (GER)
20 August 2004; 11:30	Romero 7	(18–15)	Pajovič, Tomšič 7	Sports Pavilion, Athens; Referees: Lemme, Ullrich (GER)
20 August 2004; 11:30	2× (yellow card) 3× (suspension)		4× (yellow card) 3× (suspension)	Sports Pavilion, Athens; Referees: Lemme, Ullrich (GER)

20 August 2004; 19:30	Russia	25–26	Croatia	Sports Pavilion, Athens; Referees: Hansson, Olsson (SWE)
20 August 2004; 19:30	Rastvortsev, Torgovanov 6	(14–10)	Lacković 9	Sports Pavilion, Athens; Referees: Hansson, Olsson (SWE)
20 August 2004; 19:30	2× (yellow card) 5× (suspension)		3× (yellow card) 3× (suspension)	Sports Pavilion, Athens; Referees: Hansson, Olsson (SWE)

22 August 2004; 09:30	Slovenia	26–23	South Korea	Sports Pavilion, Athens; Referees: Hassan, Selim (EGY)
22 August 2004; 09:30	Rutenka 7	(12–11)	Lee J. 6	Sports Pavilion, Athens; Referees: Hassan, Selim (EGY)
22 August 2004; 09:30	4× (yellow card) 8× (suspension) 1× (red card)		3× (yellow card) 2× (suspension)	Sports Pavilion, Athens; Referees: Hassan, Selim (EGY)

22 August 2004; 11:30	Croatia	30–22	Spain	Sports Pavilion, Athens; Referees: Baum, Góralczyk (POL)
22 August 2004; 11:30	Džomba 7	(15–9)	García 5	Sports Pavilion, Athens; Referees: Baum, Góralczyk (POL)
22 August 2004; 11:30	3× (yellow card) 1× (suspension)		3× (yellow card) 4× (suspension)	Sports Pavilion, Athens; Referees: Baum, Góralczyk (POL)

22 August 2004; 19:30	Russia	34–30	Iceland	Sports Pavilion, Athens; Referees: Bord, Buy (FRA)
22 August 2004; 19:30	Rastvortsev 10	(17–11)	Stefánsson 10	Sports Pavilion, Athens; Referees: Bord, Buy (FRA)
22 August 2004; 19:30	3× (yellow card) 5× (suspension)		3× (yellow card) 2× (suspension)	Sports Pavilion, Athens; Referees: Bord, Buy (FRA)

=== Group B ===
Pos	Team	Pld	W	D	L	GF	GA	GD	Pts	Qualification
1	France	5	5	0	0	135	108	+27	10	Quarterfinals
2	Hungary	5	4	0	1	132	124	+8	8	Quarterfinals
3	Germany	5	3	0	2	139	110	+29	6	Quarterfinals
4	Greece (H)	5	2	0	3	117	130	−13	4	Quarterfinals
5	Brazil	5	1	0	4	105	133	−28	2	
6	Egypt	5	0	0	5	110	133	−23	0	

Rules for classification: 1) Points; 2) Head-to-head points; 3) Head-to-head goal difference; 4) Head-to-head goals scored; 5) Goal difference; 6) Goals scored; 7) Draw.
(H) Hosts

14 August 2004; 11:30	Hungary	33–28	Egypt	Sports Pavilion, Athens; Referees: Boye, Jensen (DEN)
14 August 2004; 11:30	Pásztor 9	(16–15)	Zaky 10	Sports Pavilion, Athens; Referees: Boye, Jensen (DEN)
14 August 2004; 11:30	3× (yellow card) 8× (suspension)		3× (yellow card) 3× (suspension)	Sports Pavilion, Athens; Referees: Boye, Jensen (DEN)

14 August 2004; 16:30	Germany	28–18	Greece	Sports Pavilion, Athens; Referees: Bretó, Huelin (ESP)
14 August 2004; 16:30	Kehrmann, Schwarzer 6	(15–8)	Grammatikos 5	Sports Pavilion, Athens; Referees: Bretó, Huelin (ESP)
14 August 2004; 16:30	2× (yellow card) 5× (suspension)		3× (yellow card) 3× (suspension)	Sports Pavilion, Athens; Referees: Bretó, Huelin (ESP)

14 August 2004; 21:30	France	31–17	Brazil	Sports Pavilion, Athens; Referees: Arnaldsson, Viðarsson (ISL)
14 August 2004; 21:30	Anquetil 7	(14–6)	Justino, Silva 4	Sports Pavilion, Athens; Referees: Arnaldsson, Viðarsson (ISL)
14 August 2004; 21:30	3× (yellow card) 4× (suspension)		2× (yellow card) 6× (suspension)	Sports Pavilion, Athens; Referees: Arnaldsson, Viðarsson (ISL)

16 August 2004; 16:30	Greece	25–29	France	Sports Pavilion, Athens; Referees: Boye, Jensen (DEN)
16 August 2004; 16:30	Karypidis 7	(15–15)	Anquetil 9	Sports Pavilion, Athens; Referees: Boye, Jensen (DEN)
16 August 2004; 16:30	4× (yellow card) 9× (suspension)		3× (yellow card) 4× (suspension)	Sports Pavilion, Athens; Referees: Boye, Jensen (DEN)

16 August 2004; 19:30	Brazil	19–20	Hungary	Sports Pavilion, Athens; Referees: Nachevski, Nachevski (MKD)
16 August 2004; 19:30	Souza 5	(10–10)	four players 3	Sports Pavilion, Athens; Referees: Nachevski, Nachevski (MKD)
16 August 2004; 19:30	3× (yellow card) 4× (suspension)		3× (yellow card) 4× (suspension)	Sports Pavilion, Athens; Referees: Nachevski, Nachevski (MKD)

16 August 2004; 21:30	Egypt	14–26	Germany	Sports Pavilion, Athens; Referees: Arnaldsson, Viðarsson (ISL)
16 August 2004; 21:30	Yosry 4	(5–14)	three players 5	Sports Pavilion, Athens; Referees: Arnaldsson, Viðarsson (ISL)
16 August 2004; 21:30	3× (yellow card) 11× (suspension) 1× (red card)		3× (yellow card) 8× (suspension) 1× (red card)	Sports Pavilion, Athens; Referees: Arnaldsson, Viðarsson (ISL)

18 August 2004; 14:30	France	26–23	Hungary	Sports Pavilion, Athens; Referees: Hansson, Olsson (SWE)
18 August 2004; 14:30	Guigou 6	(9–10)	Pérez 10	Sports Pavilion, Athens; Referees: Hansson, Olsson (SWE)
18 August 2004; 14:30	4× (yellow card) 9× (suspension)		3× (yellow card) 4× (suspension)	Sports Pavilion, Athens; Referees: Hansson, Olsson (SWE)

18 August 2004; 16:30	Greece	26–25	Egypt	Sports Pavilion, Athens; Referees: Øie, Togstad (NOR)
18 August 2004; 16:30	Karypidis 10	(18–10)	Keshk 7	Sports Pavilion, Athens; Referees: Øie, Togstad (NOR)
18 August 2004; 16:30	3× (yellow card) 8× (suspension)		3× (yellow card) 4× (suspension) 2× (red card)	Sports Pavilion, Athens; Referees: Øie, Togstad (NOR)

18 August 2004; 21:30	Germany	34–21	Brazil	Sports Pavilion, Athens; Referees: Požežnik, Repenšek (SLO)
18 August 2004; 21:30	Kretzschmar, Stephan 7	(18–12)	Souza 7	Sports Pavilion, Athens; Referees: Požežnik, Repenšek (SLO)
18 August 2004; 21:30	2× (yellow card) 3× (suspension)		3× (yellow card) 3× (suspension)	Sports Pavilion, Athens; Referees: Požežnik, Repenšek (SLO)

20 August 2004; 14:30	Brazil	22–26	Greece	Sports Pavilion, Athens; Referees: Arnaldsson, Viðarsson (ISL)
20 August 2004; 14:30	Justino 6	(9–13)	Grammatikos 7	Sports Pavilion, Athens; Referees: Arnaldsson, Viðarsson (ISL)
20 August 2004; 14:30	3× (yellow card) 4× (suspension)		3× (yellow card) 3× (suspension)	Sports Pavilion, Athens; Referees: Arnaldsson, Viðarsson (ISL)

20 August 2004; 16:30	Hungary	30–29	Germany	Sports Pavilion, Athens; Referees: Boye, Jensen (DEN)
20 August 2004; 16:30	Nagy 11	(17–14)	Kretzschmar 8	Sports Pavilion, Athens; Referees: Boye, Jensen (DEN)
20 August 2004; 16:30	3× (yellow card) 4× (suspension)		3× (yellow card) 6× (suspension)	Sports Pavilion, Athens; Referees: Boye, Jensen (DEN)

20 August 2004; 21:30	France	22–21	Egypt	Sports Pavilion, Athens; Referees: Bretó, Huelin (ESP)
20 August 2004; 21:30	Girault 8	(11–13)	Keshk 6	Sports Pavilion, Athens; Referees: Bretó, Huelin (ESP)
20 August 2004; 21:30	3× (yellow card) 5× (suspension)		4× (yellow card) 8× (suspension) 1× (red card)	Sports Pavilion, Athens; Referees: Bretó, Huelin (ESP)

22 August 2004; 14:30	Germany	22–27	France	Sports Pavilion, Athens; Referees: Øie, Togstad (NOR)
22 August 2004; 14:30	Kehrmann, Schwarzer 5	(12–11)	Fernandez 6	Sports Pavilion, Athens; Referees: Øie, Togstad (NOR)
22 August 2004; 14:30	2× (yellow card) 4× (suspension)		2× (yellow card) 4× (suspension)	Sports Pavilion, Athens; Referees: Øie, Togstad (NOR)

22 August 2004; 14:30	Hungary	26–22	Greece	Sports Pavilion, Athens; Referees: Požežnik, Repenšek (SLO)
22 August 2004; 14:30	Pérez 7	(12–12)	Voglis 7	Sports Pavilion, Athens; Referees: Požežnik, Repenšek (SLO)
22 August 2004; 14:30	3× (yellow card) 1× (suspension)		2× (yellow card) 1× (suspension)	Sports Pavilion, Athens; Referees: Požežnik, Repenšek (SLO)

22 August 2004; 21:30	Egypt	22–26	Brazil	Sports Pavilion, Athens; Referees: Hansson, Olsson (SWE)
22 August 2004; 21:30	Abdel Salam 5	(11–10)	Kojoroski 6	Sports Pavilion, Athens; Referees: Hansson, Olsson (SWE)
22 August 2004; 21:30	2× (yellow card) 3× (suspension)		2× (yellow card) 7× (suspension) 1× (red card)	Sports Pavilion, Athens; Referees: Hansson, Olsson (SWE)

== Knockout stage ==
In this single-elimination stage, the first- and second-placed teams of one group played against the other group's fourth- and third-placed teams, respectively, to contest the quarter-final round, held on August 24, at the Sports Pavilion. The winners advanced to the semi-finals, disputed at the Indoor Arena on August 27, with the losing semi-finalists playing for the bronze medal match on the following day, and the final being played two days later.

=== Bracket ===
Quarterfinals
24 August
Croatia	33
Greece	27
24 August
South Korea	25
Hungary	30
24 August
Germany (pen.)	32
Spain	30
24 August
France	24
Russia	26

Semifinals
27 August
Croatia	33
Hungary	31
27 August
Germany	21
Russia	15

Gold medal
29 August
Croatia	26
Germany	24
Bronze medal
28 August
Hungary	26
Russia	28

5–8th place semifinals
27 August
Greece	29
South Korea	24
27 August
Spain	27
France	29

Fifth place
28 August
Greece	15
France	33
Seventh place
28 August
South Korea	24
Spain	31

=== Quarterfinals ===
24 August 2004; 14:30	South Korea	25–30	Hungary	Sports Pavilion, Athens; Referees: Baum, Góralczyk (POL)
24 August 2004; 14:30	Yoon Kyung-s. 7	(13–14)	Nagy 9	Sports Pavilion, Athens; Referees: Baum, Góralczyk (POL)
24 August 2004; 14:30	3× (yellow card) 2× (suspension)		3× (yellow card) 5× (suspension)	Sports Pavilion, Athens; Referees: Baum, Góralczyk (POL)

24 August 2004; 16:30	Croatia	33–27	Greece	Sports Pavilion, Athens; Referees: Lemme, Ullrich (GER)
24 August 2004; 16:30	Džomba 11	(19–11)	Alvanos, Balomenos 6	Sports Pavilion, Athens; Referees: Lemme, Ullrich (GER)
24 August 2004; 16:30	3× (yellow card)		4× (yellow card) 2× (suspension)	Sports Pavilion, Athens; Referees: Lemme, Ullrich (GER)

24 August 2004
19:30
Germany
32–30 (ET)
Spain
Sports Pavilion, Athens
Referees: Arnaldsson, Viðarsson (ISL)
Schwarzer, Stephan 9
(15–16)
Garcia 7
3× (yellow card) 4× (suspension)

3× (yellow card) 4× (suspension)

FT: 27–27 ET: 1–1, 2–2 Pen: 2–0

24 August 2004; 22:05	France	24–26	Russia	Sports Pavilion, Athens; Referees: Nachevski, Nachevski (MKD)
24 August 2004; 22:05	Abati 6	(14–13)	Ivanov, Koksharov 5	Sports Pavilion, Athens; Referees: Nachevski, Nachevski (MKD)
24 August 2004; 22:05	3× (yellow card) 2× (suspension)		3× (yellow card) 3× (suspension)	Sports Pavilion, Athens; Referees: Nachevski, Nachevski (MKD)

=== 5–8th place semifinals ===
27 August 2004; 11:30	Greece	29–24	South Korea	Helliniko Olympic Indoor Arena, Athens; Referees: Nachevski, Nachevski (MKD)
27 August 2004; 11:30	Balomenos 8	(16–9)	Yoon Kyung-s. 6	Helliniko Olympic Indoor Arena, Athens; Referees: Nachevski, Nachevski (MKD)
27 August 2004; 11:30	3× (yellow card) 6× (suspension) 1× (red card)		3× (yellow card) 1× (suspension)	Helliniko Olympic Indoor Arena, Athens; Referees: Nachevski, Nachevski (MKD)

27 August 2004; 09:30	Spain	27–29	France	Helliniko Olympic Indoor Arena, Athens; Referees: Boye, Jensen (DEN)
27 August 2004; 09:30	Romero, Ortega 5	(13–11)	Burdet, Girault 8	Helliniko Olympic Indoor Arena, Athens; Referees: Boye, Jensen (DEN)
27 August 2004; 09:30	3× (yellow card) 3× (suspension)		3× (yellow card) 4× (suspension)	Helliniko Olympic Indoor Arena, Athens; Referees: Boye, Jensen (DEN)

=== Semifinals ===
27 August 2004; 14:30	Croatia	33–31	Hungary	Helliniko Olympic Indoor Arena, Athens; Referees: Arnaldsson, Viðarsson (ISL)
27 August 2004; 14:30	Balić 9	(18–16)	Pérez 8	Helliniko Olympic Indoor Arena, Athens; Referees: Arnaldsson, Viðarsson (ISL)
27 August 2004; 14:30	3× (yellow card) 3× (suspension)		3× (yellow card) 2× (suspension)	Helliniko Olympic Indoor Arena, Athens; Referees: Arnaldsson, Viðarsson (ISL)

27 August 2004; 16:30	Germany	21–15	Russia	Helliniko Olympic Indoor Arena, Athens; Referees: Bord, Buy (FRA)
27 August 2004; 16:30	Kretzschmar 5	(9–10)	Torgovanov 5	Helliniko Olympic Indoor Arena, Athens; Referees: Bord, Buy (FRA)
27 August 2004; 16:30	3× (yellow card) 4× (suspension) 1× (red card)		2× (yellow card) 3× (suspension)	Helliniko Olympic Indoor Arena, Athens; Referees: Bord, Buy (FRA)

=== Eleventh place game ===
24 August 2004; 09:30	Slovenia	30–24	Egypt	Sports Pavilion, Athens; Referees: Hansson, Olsson (SWE)
24 August 2004; 09:30	Brumen, Žvižej 6	(11–13)	Yosry 6	Sports Pavilion, Athens; Referees: Hansson, Olsson (SWE)
24 August 2004; 09:30	1× (yellow card) 7× (suspension) 1× (red card)		1× (yellow card) 5× (suspension)	Sports Pavilion, Athens; Referees: Hansson, Olsson (SWE)

=== Ninth place game ===
24 August 2004; 11:30	Brazil	25–29	Iceland	Sports Pavilion, Athens; Referees: Hassan, Selim (EGY)
24 August 2004; 11:30	Souza, Tupan 6	(11–13)	G. Sigurðsson 8	Sports Pavilion, Athens; Referees: Hassan, Selim (EGY)
24 August 2004; 11:30	3× (yellow card) 5× (suspension) 1× (red card)		4× (yellow card) 2× (suspension)	Sports Pavilion, Athens; Referees: Hassan, Selim (EGY)

=== Seventh place game ===
28 August 2004; 14:30	South Korea	24–31	Spain	Helliniko Olympic Indoor Arena, Athens; Referees: Gardinovacki, Maric (SCG)
28 August 2004; 14:30	Yoon Kyung-s. 7	(11–12)	Colón 7	Helliniko Olympic Indoor Arena, Athens; Referees: Gardinovacki, Maric (SCG)
28 August 2004; 14:30	3× (yellow card) 2× (suspension)		3× (yellow card) 2× (suspension)	Helliniko Olympic Indoor Arena, Athens; Referees: Gardinovacki, Maric (SCG)

=== Fifth place game ===
28 August 2004; 19:30	Greece	15–33	France	Helliniko Olympic Indoor Arena, Athens; Referees: Lemme, Ullrich (GER)
28 August 2004; 19:30	Grammatikos 7	(7–17)	Fernandez 9	Helliniko Olympic Indoor Arena, Athens; Referees: Lemme, Ullrich (GER)
28 August 2004; 19:30	3× (yellow card) 6× (suspension)		2× (yellow card) 3× (suspension)	Helliniko Olympic Indoor Arena, Athens; Referees: Lemme, Ullrich (GER)

=== Bronze medal game ===
28 August 2004; 21:30	Hungary	26–28	Russia	Helliniko Olympic Indoor Arena, Athens; Referees: Bavas, Migas (GRE)
28 August 2004; 21:30	Pérez 10	(10–13)	Koksharov 8	Helliniko Olympic Indoor Arena, Athens; Referees: Bavas, Migas (GRE)
28 August 2004; 21:30	2× (yellow card) 5× (suspension)		4× (yellow card) 4× (suspension)	Helliniko Olympic Indoor Arena, Athens; Referees: Bavas, Migas (GRE)

=== Gold medal game ===
29 August 2004; 16:45	Croatia	26–24	Germany	Helliniko Olympic Indoor Arena, Athens; Referees: Hansson, Olsson (SWE)
29 August 2004; 16:45	Džomba 9	(11–12)	Kretzschmar 9	Helliniko Olympic Indoor Arena, Athens; Referees: Hansson, Olsson (SWE)
29 August 2004; 16:45	3× (yellow card) 2× (suspension)		3× (yellow card) 5× (suspension)	Helliniko Olympic Indoor Arena, Athens; Referees: Hansson, Olsson (SWE)

== Ranking and statistics ==
=== Final ranking ===
Rank	Team
1st place, gold medalist(s)	Croatia
2nd place, silver medalist(s)	Germany
3rd place, bronze medalist(s)	Russia
4	Hungary
5	France
6	Greece
7	Spain
8	South Korea
9	Iceland
10	Brazil
11	Slovenia
12	Egypt

=== All Star Team ===
Position	Player
Goalkeeper	Henning Fritz (GER)
Left wing	Juanín García (ESP)
Left back	Carlos Pérez (HUN)
Centre back	Ivano Balić (CRO)
Right back	Ólafur Stefánsson (ISL)
Right wing	Mirza Džomba (CRO)
Pivot	Christian Schwarzer (GER)

Source: IHF

=== Top goalscorers ===
Rank	Name	Goals	Shots	%
1	(South Korea) Yoon Kyung-shin	58	109	53
2	(Croatia) Mirza Džomba	55	71	77
3	(Hungary) Carlos Pérez	54	116	47
4	(Russia) Eduard Koksharov	45	66	68
5	(Germany) Stefan Kretzschmar	44	75	59
6	(Iceland) Ólafur Stefánsson	43	67	64
7	(Greece) Nikos Grammatikos	41	71	58
8	(Germany) Florian Kehrmann	40	69	58
8	(Russia) Aleksey Rastvortsev	40	85	47
10	(Hungary) László Nagy	39	70	56
10	(Croatia) Igor Vori	39	58	67

=== Top goalkeepers ===
Rank	Name	%	Saves	Shots
1	(Spain) David Barrufet	41	85	208
1	(Germany) Henning Fritz	41	102	246
3	(Croatia) Venio Losert	39	78	198
4	(Hungary) Nándor Fazekas	37	67	182
5	(Slovenia) Beno Lapajne	36	64	178
5	(France) Thierry Omeyer	36	80	222
7	(South Korea) Han Kyung-tai	35	100	283
7	(Egypt) Mohamed Bakir El-Nakib	35	46	132
7	(Croatia) Vlado Šola	35	39	112
10	(Spain) José Javier Hombrados	34	51	150
10	(Russia) Andrey Lavrov	34	34	85
10	(Brazil) Alexandre Vasconcelos	34	43	127
