= Peter Gentzel =

Swedish handball player (born 1968)

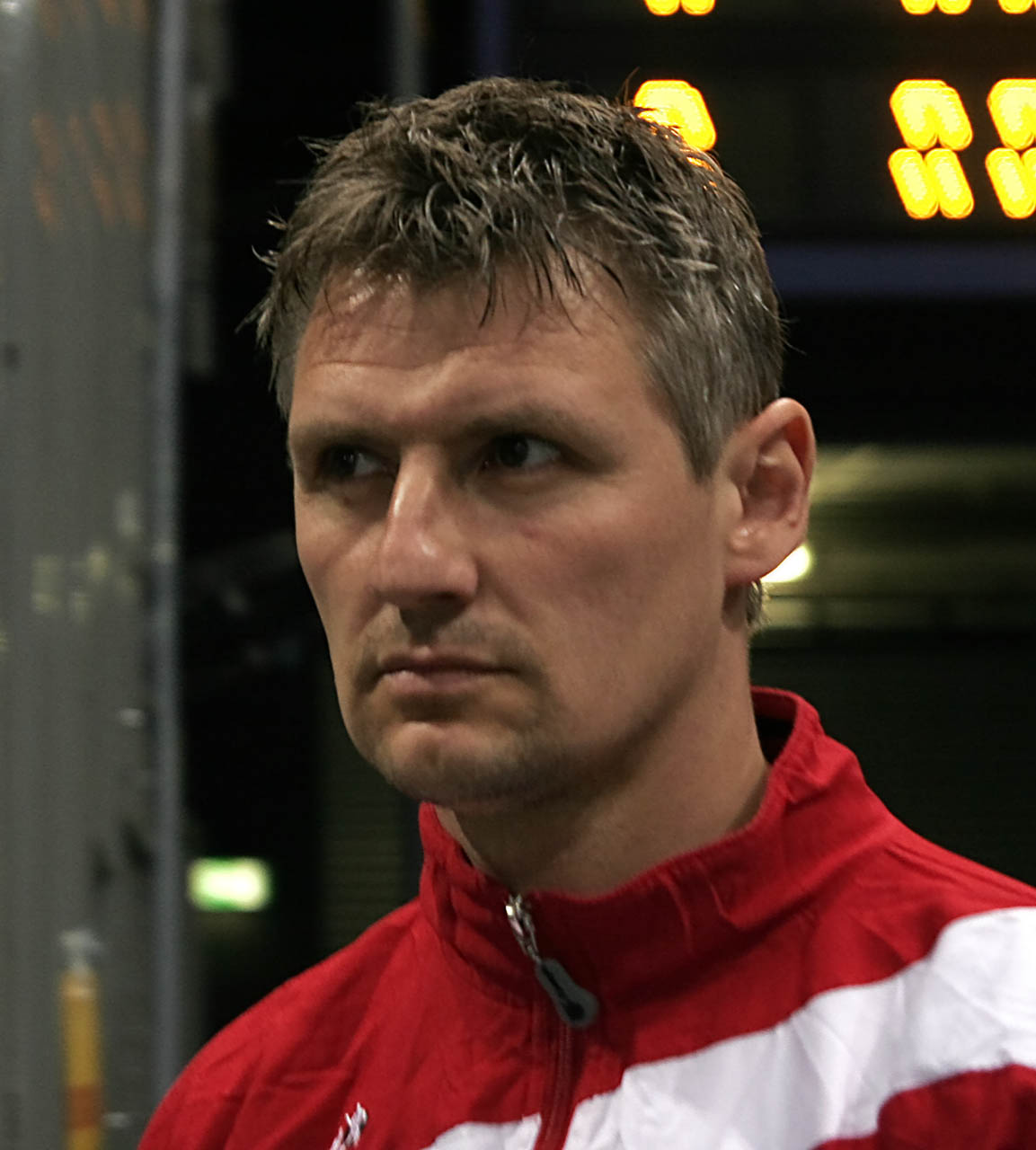
- Gentzel in 2007

Personal information
- Nationality: Swedish
- Born: 12 October 1968 (age 58) Gothenburg, Sweden
- Height: 1.99 m (6 ft 6 in)

Sport
- Sport: Handball
- Position: Goalkeeper
- Current club: Retired

Senior clubs
- Years: Team
- -1989: IK Heim
- 1989-1999: Redbergslids IK
- 1999-2000: CB Cantabria
- 2000-2001: BM Granollers
- 2001-2009: HSG Nordhorn
- 2009-2010: THW Kiel
National team
Years	Team	Apps	(Gls)
1992-2009	Sweden	220	(0)

Teams managed
- 2009-2012: HK Varberg
Medal record
Olympic Games
Silver medal – second place	2000 Sydney	Team
European Championship
Gold medal – first place	1998 Italy
Gold medal – first place	2000 Croatia
Gold medal – first place	2002 Sweden
World Championship
Gold medal – first place	1999 Egypt
Silver medal – second place	1997 Japan
Silver medal – second place	2001 France

Hans Peter Ludvig Gentzel (born 12 October 1968) is a Swedish former handball player who competed in the 2000 Summer Olympics.

He was named Swedish male player of the year in 1998 and in 2003 he was number two in the IHF World player of the year, receiving 29.5% of the votes.

In 2000, he was a member of the Swedish handball team that won the silver medal in the Olympic tournament. He played all eight matches as goalkeeper. In December 2010, Gentzel ended his career and took a high ranked job within Swedish handball.

== Career ==
Between 1989 and 1999 he played for Swedish top club Redbergslids IK from Gothenburg. Here he won the Swedish Championship six times and the Swedish cup 3 times.

Between 2001 and 2009 he played for HSG Nordhorn. Here he won the EHF European League. When the club went bankrupt he joined THW Kiel on a one year contract. In his only season at the club he won the EHF Champions League and German Championship. Afterwards he ended his career.

After his playing days he worked on the preparations for the 2011 World Men's Handball Championship, which took place in Sweden. Afterwards he has been the director at the organisation "Svensk Elithandboll".

== Titles ==
=== Club ===
- Swedish Championship: 1989, 1993, 1995, 1996, 1997 und 1998
- Swedish Cup: 1996, 1997 und 1998
- EHF European League: 2008
- EHF Champions League: 2010
- Handball-Bundesliga: 2010
