= Mikhail Chipurin =

Russian handball player

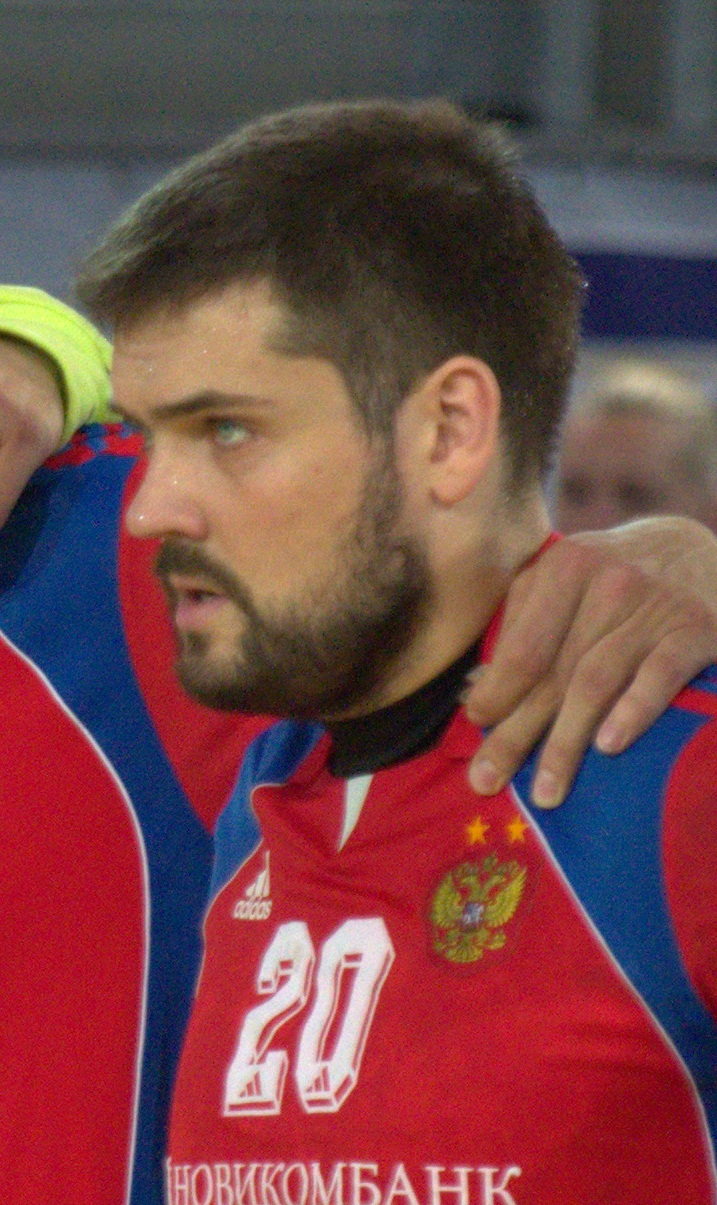

Personal information
- Full name: Mikhail Alekseevich Chipurin
- Nationality: Russian
- Born: 17 November 1980 (age 45) Moscow, Russia
- Height: 1.85 m (6 ft 1 in)

Sport
- Sport: Handball
- Position: Pivot

Senior clubs
- Years: Team
- 2000–2013: Chekhovskiye Medvedi
- 2013–2015: RK Vardar
- 2015–2017: US Ivry Handball
National team
Years	Team	Apps	(Gls)
2000–2017	Russia	208	(505)
Medal record
Olympic Games
Bronze medal – third place	2004 Athens	Team

Mikhail Alekseevich Chipurin (Russian: Михаил Алексеевич Чипурин, born 17 November 1980) is a former Russian handball player for the Russian national team.

In 2004 he was a member of the Russian team which won the bronze medal in the Olympic tournament. He played all eight matches and scored six goals.
