= Aleksandr Chernoivanov =

Russian handball player

Personal information
- Nationality: Russian
- Born: 13 February 1979 (age 47) Krasnodar, Russia
- Height: 2.05 m (6 ft 9 in)

Sport
- Sport: Handball
- Position: Pivot
- Current club: Chekhovskiye Medvedi
- Number: 10

Youth career
- Years: Team
- -1997: Krasnodar

Senior clubs
- Years: Team
- 1997-2004: SKIF Krasnodar
- 2004-2017: Medvedi Moscow
- 2017-2019: HBC CSKA Moscow
- 2019-2020: Handball Club Taganrog
National team
Years	Team	Apps	(Gls)
–	Russia	116	(232)

Aleksandr Petrovich Chernoivanov (Russian: Александр Петрович Черноиванов; born 13 February 1979) is a Russian former handball player, who played for the Russian national team.

He competed at the 2016 European Men's Handball Championship.
