= Henning Fritz =

German handball player (born 1974)

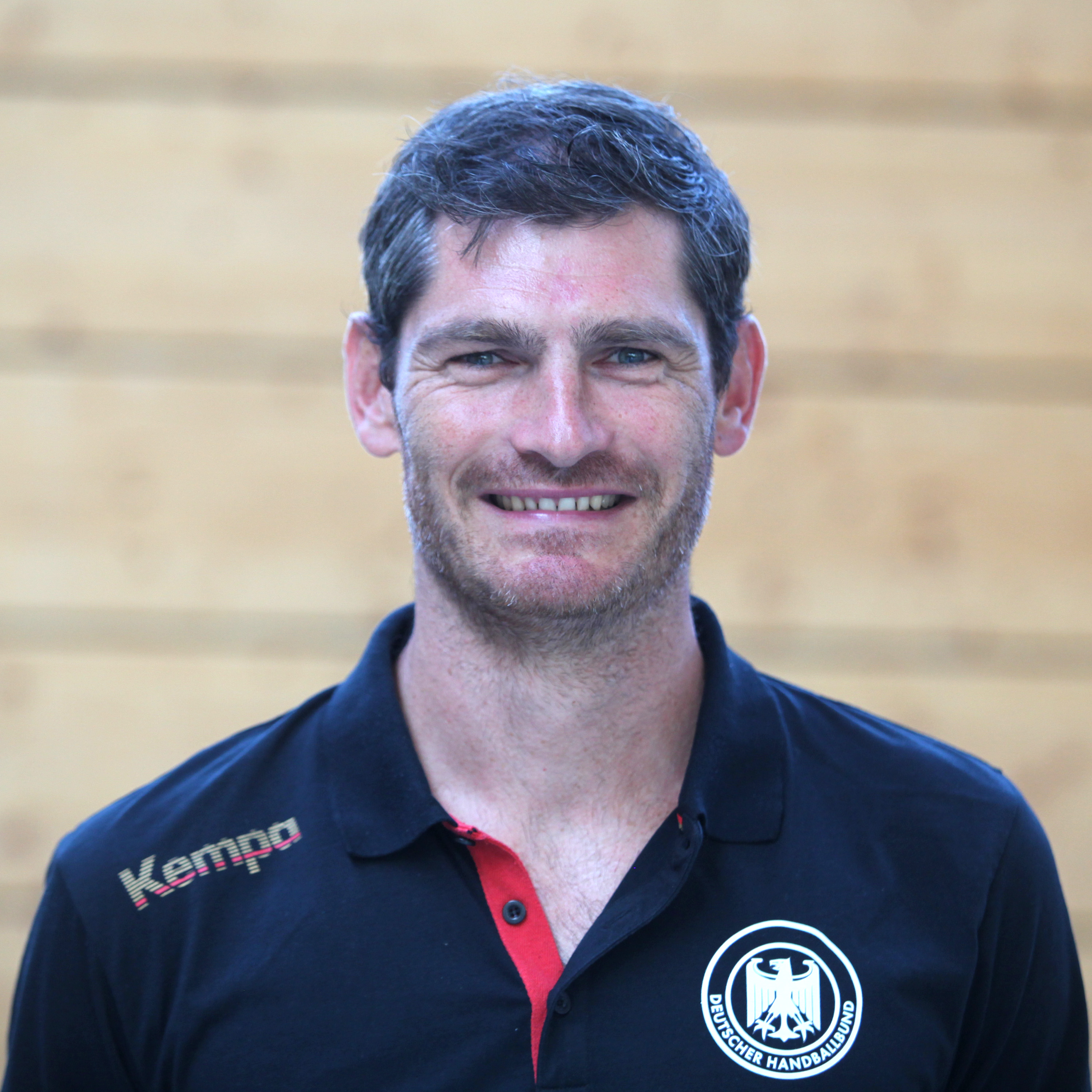

Personal information
- Nationality: German
- Born: 21 September 1974 (age 52) Magdeburg, East Germany
- Height: 1.88 m (6 ft 2 in)

Sport
- Sport: Handball
- Position: Goalkeeper

Youth career
- Years: Team
- –1984: Dynamo Magdeburg
- 1984–1988: TuS Magdeburg

Senior clubs
- Years: Team
- 1988–2001: SC Magdeburg
- 2001–2007: THW Kiel
- 2007–2012: Rhein-Neckar Löwen
- 2021: SG Flensburg-Handewitt
National team
Years	Team	Apps	(Gls)
1994–2008	Germany	235	(0)

Teams managed
- 2014–: Germany (goalkeeping coach)
Medal record
Olympic Games
Silver medal – second place	2004 Athens	Team competition
World Championship
Gold medal – first place	2007 Germany	Team competition
Silver medal – second place	2003 Porgual	Team competition
European Championship
Gold medal – first place	2004 Slovenia	Team competition
Silver medal – second place	2002 Sweden	Team

Henning Fritz (born 21 September 1974) is a German retired handball goalkeeper, current entrepreneur, book author and TV expert. In 2004, he was the first goalkeeper to be named World Player of the Year.

== Sports career ==
At 1.88 metres (6 ft 2 in), Fritz is a relatively short goalkeeper who began playing major-league handball with SC Magdeburg. He moved to THW Kiel in 2001 and was a member of the Men's German National Handball team from 2002. The German team took second place in the European championships in Sweden that year and another second place in the world championships 2003 in Portugal. In 2004, he participated in the team's success in Slovenia, where it won the European Championships. In 2004 in Athens, he played with the team to another second place.

The opening game of the 2007 World Cup was his 200th game on the national team. He played a great championship, became Most Valuable Player in several games and was nominated for the All Star Team.

Fritz has been the goalkeeping coach of the German national team since 2014.

== Career ==
=== TV expert ===
Since the 2015/16 season, Fritz has been a co-commentator for the television station Sky Deutschland, reporting on EHF Champions League and Handball Bundesliga matches.

=== Motivation coach ===
In addition to his commentary work, he gives lectures and seminars on the subject of regeneration in sport and management. He also writes columns on handball and shares his expertise with readers.

=== Entrepreneur ===
Following his active career, he revealed in 2005 that he had to fight with the burn-out syndrome, which almost forced him to end his career. With a frequency-modulated music application he found his old strength. From the experience gained from this, he and his partners developed regeneration systems based on frequency-modulated acoustics. In 2018, he and a partner founded the company Neuronavi, which is dedicated to the topic of regeneration and reduction of permanent stress.

== Books ==
- Frank Gunter, Henning Fritz, Daniel Strigel, Powern und Pausieren, March 2020, Verlag: Edition Essentials, ISBN 978-3-947670-05-5, ISBN 3-947670-05-2 (in German)
- Henning Fritz, Halten und Siegen: Technik, Taktik und Training für Handball-Torhüter und ihre Trainer, January 2009, Philippka-Verlag, EAN / ISBN 978-3-89417-177-3 (in German)

== Personal life ==
Fritz is married, has two children and lives in Kraichgau.
