= Oleg Grams =

Russian handball player

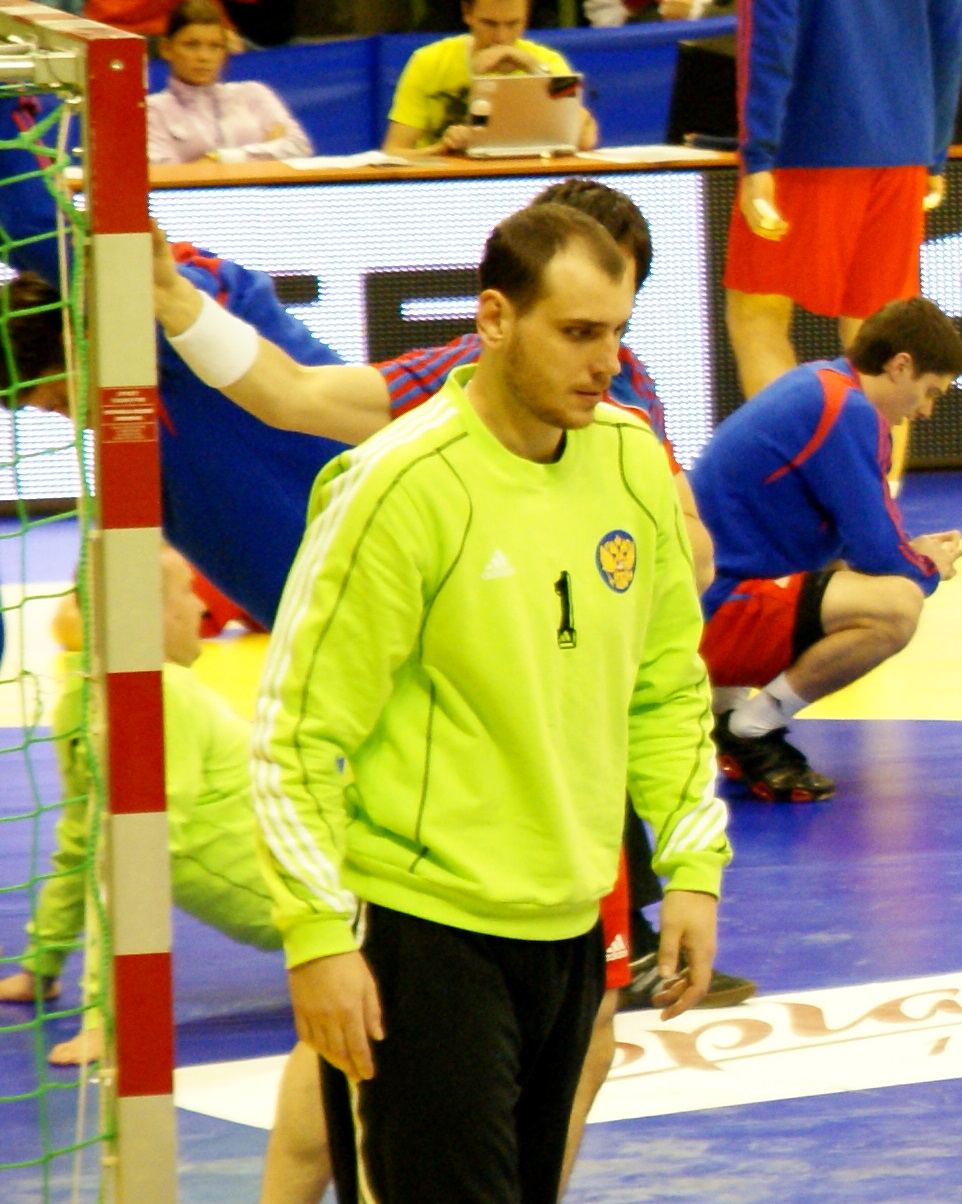

Personal information
- Nationality: Russian
- Born: 20 February 1984 (age 42) Krasnodar, Russia
- Height: 2.00 m (6 ft 7 in)

Sport
- Sport: Handball
- Position: Goalkeeper
- Number: 1

Senior clubs
- Years: Team
- 2001–2017: Chekhovskiye Medvedi
- 2017–2021: Dunkerque
National team
Years	Team	Apps	(Gls)
2007–2020	Russia	152	(0)

Teams managed
- 2021–: Chekhovskiye Medvedi (goalkeeping coach)

Oleg Mikhaylovich Grams (Russian: Олег Михайлович Грамс; born 20 February 1984) is a former Russian handball player for the Russian national team.

He competed at the 2008 Summer Olympics in Beijing, where the Russian team placed sixth.
