= Valery Gopin =

Russian handball player (born 1964)

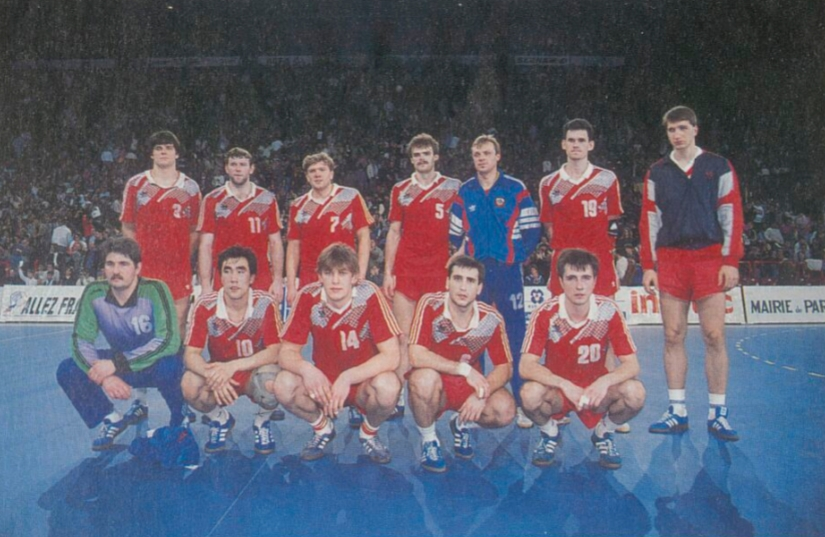

Personal information
- Nationality: Russian
- Born: 8 May 1964 (age 62) Seltso, Bryansk Oblast, Russian SFSR, USSR
- Height: 186 cm (73 in)

Sport
- Sport: Handball
- Position: Left wing

Senior clubs
- Years: Team
- 1981-1991: Dynamo Chelyabinsk
- 1991-1994: Club Maristas Málaga
- 1994-1996: SC Merano
- 1996-1997: SG Leutershausen
- 1997-1998: VfL Gummersbach
- 1998-?: SG Hameln
- –: SG Kronau-Östringen
- 2001-2003: SC Merano
National team
Years	Team		
-1992	Soviet Union		
1992	Unified Team	7	(27)
1992-?	Russia		

Teams managed
- 2003-2006: Dynamo Chelyabinsk
- 2006: Eintracht Hildesheim
Medal record
Men's Handball
Representing Soviet Union
Olympic Games
Gold medal – first place	1988 Seoul	Team
World Championships
Silver medal – second place	1990 Czechoslovakia	Team
Representing the Unified Team
Olympic Games
Gold medal – first place	1992 Barcelona	Team
Representing Russia
World Championships
Gold medal – first place	1993 Sweden	Team
Gold medal – first place	1997 Japan	Team
Silver medal – second place	1999 Egypt	Team
European Championship
Gold medal – first place	1996 Spain	Team
Silver medal – second place	1994 Portugal	Team

Valery Pavlovich Gopin (Russian: Валерий Павлович Гопин, born 8 May 1964) is a Russian handball player. He became Olympic champion in 1988 with the Soviet Union national handball team, and in 1992 with the Unified Team. He became European champion with the Russia national handball team in 1996.

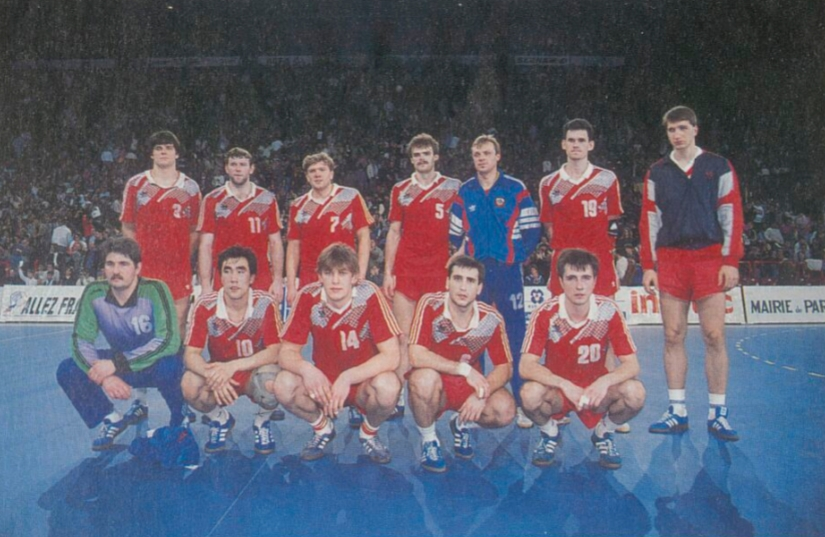
The CIS team in 1992
