= Vyacheslav Atavin =

Soviet handball player

Personal information
- Full name: Vyacheslav Vladimirovich Atavin
- Nationality: Russian
- Born: 4 February 1967 (age 59) Krasnoyarsk, Russia
- Height: 202 cm (80 in)

Sport
- Sport: Handball
- Position: Left wing

Senior clubs
- Years: Team
- -1988: Dinamo Astrakhan
- 1988-1991: Nova Saint Petersburg
- 1991-1997: BM Granollers
- 1997-2000: SC Magdeburg
- 2000-2002: BM Granollers
- 2002-2005: AC Filippos Verias
- 2005-2007: BM La Roca
National team
Years	Team	
–	Soviet Union	
–	Russia	288
Medal record
Men's Handball
Olympic Games
Representing the Soviet Union
Gold medal – first place	1988 Seoul	Team
World Championship
Representing the Soviet Union
Silver medal – second place	1990 Czechoslovakia	Team
Representing Russia
Gold medal – first place	1993 Sweden	Team
Gold medal – first place	1997 Japan	Team
European Championship
Representing Russia
Gold medal – first place	1996 Spain	Team

Vyacheslav Vladimirovich Atavin (Russian: Вячеслав Владимирович Атавин, born February 4, 1967, in Krasnodar) is a former Soviet and Russian handball player.

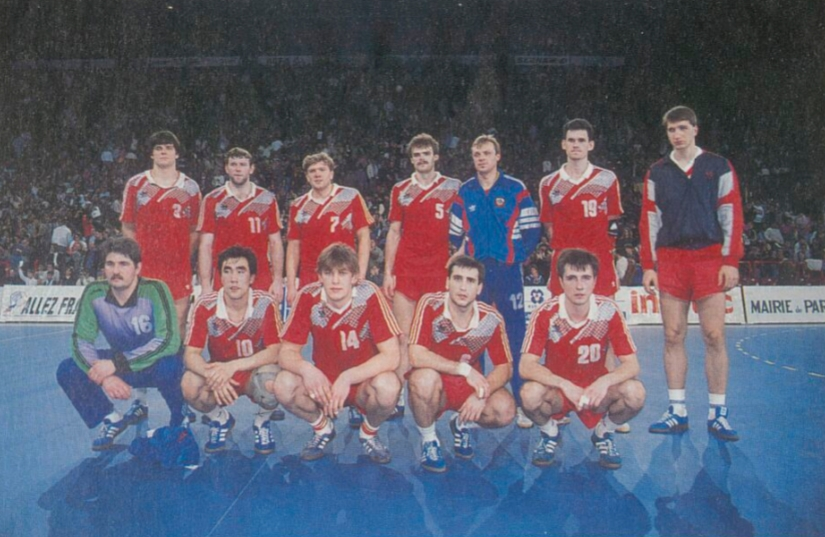
The CIS team in 1992

During the Soviet period of his career Atavin trained at Dynamo in Astrakhan. He became the Honoured Master of Sports of the USSR in 1988 and competed for the USSR National Team between 1988 and 1991. In 1988 he won the gold medal with the USSR team at the 1988 Summer Olympics. He played all six matches and scored 23 goals. Since 1992 he competed for Russia.

== Private ==
Atavin graduated from Astrakhan Institute of Fish Industry and Economics in 1990.
