= Dmitry Filippov =

Russian handball player

Personal information
- Full name: Dmitry Rudolfovitj Filippov
- Born: 19 May 1969 (age 57) Krasnodar, Soviet Union
- Height: 187 cm (74 in)

Sport
- Sport: Handball
- Position: Centre back, left wing

Senior clubs
- Years: Team
- -1994: SKIF Krasnodar
- 1994-1996: UMF Stjarnan
- 1996-2001: LTV Wuppertal
- 2001-2002: HC Empor Rostock
- 2002-2007: SV Anhalt Bernburg
- 2007-2011: HC Aschersleben
National team
Years	Team	Apps
–	Russia	160

Teams managed
- 2007-2011: HC Aschersleben
- 2011-2013: HV Wernigerode
- 2013-: HC Aschersleben
Medal record
Men's handball
Representing Russia
Olympic Games
Gold medal – first place	2000 Sydney	Team
World Championships
Gold medal – first place	1993 Sweden	Team
Silver medal – second place	1999 Egypt	Team
European Championships
Gold medal – first place	1996 Spain	Team
Silver medal – second place	1994 Portugal	Team
Silver medal – second place	2000 Croatia	Team

Dmitry Filippov (Russian: Дмитрий Рудольфович Филиппов; born 19 May 1969 in Krasnodar) is a Russian handball player and coach.

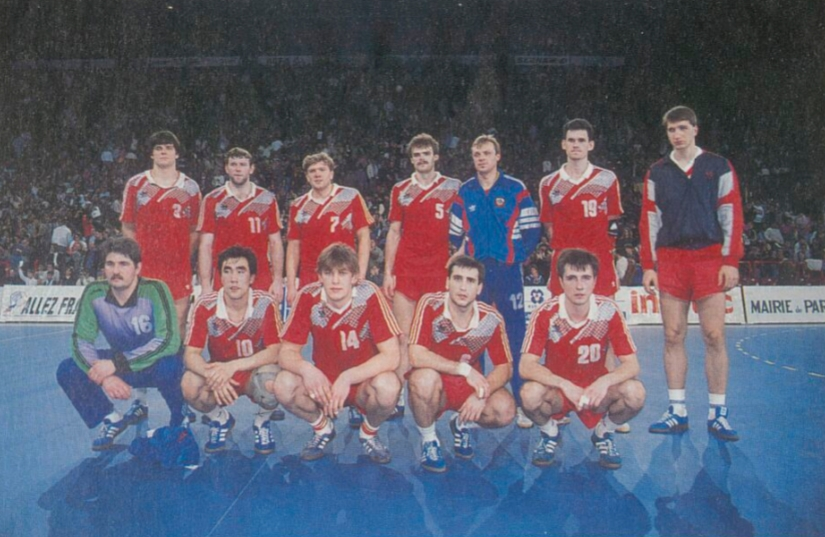
The CIS team in 1992

He played for the Russia men's national handball team at the 2000 Summer Olympics in Sydney, where Russia won the gold medal.

== Club career ==
Filippov started his career at his hometown club SKIF Krasnodar. Here he won the Soviet Championship in 1991 and 1992 and the Soviet Cup in 1992. In the 1989–1990 season he reached the final of the EHF Cup, losing to Serbian FK Proleter Zrenjanin in the final.

In 1994 he joined Icelandic team UMF Stjarnan. In 1996 he joined German team LTV Wuppertal, which had just been promoted to the Handball-Bundesliga. He was however relegated to the 2nd Bundesliga the season after.

He then joined 2nd Bundesliga team HC Empor Rostock. In November 2002 he joined SV Anhalt Bernburg, where he played until 2007.

== Coaching ==
From 2007 to 2011 he became the player-coach at HC Aschersleben in the German lower leagues. He led the team to promotion to the 2nd Bundesliga.

In 2011 he became the head coach at HV Wernigerode in the Regionalliga.

In 2013 he returned to coach HC Aschersleben, who were now in the 3. Liga.

== National team ==
With the Russiam national team he won the 1993 World Championship. At the 1994 European Championship he came second, losing to Sweden in final.

At the 1995 World Championship he scored the second most goals at the tournament with 69 goals, only behind South Korean Yoon Kyung-shin with 86. Russia, however, only finished at a disappointing 5th.

The year after he won gold medals at the 1996 European Championship.

For the 1997 World Championship and the 1998 European Championship he was not nomimated for the team, but he was back in the team again for the 1999 World Championship. Here he won silver medals again, once again losing to Sweden. At the 2000 European Championship he won another silver medal, losing to Sweden in the final for a third time.

At the 2000 Olympics he won gold medals.
