= Andrey Lavrov =

Russian handball player (born 1962)

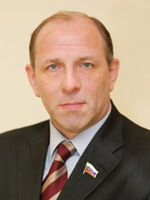
- Lavrov in 2008

Medal record

Men's handball

Representing Soviet Union

Olympic Games
Gold medal – first place	1988 Seoul	Team

World Championships
Silver medal – second place	1990 Czechoslovakia	Team

Representing the Unified Team

Olympic Games
Gold medal – first place	1992 Barcelona	Team

Representing Russia

Olympic Games
Gold medal – first place	2000 Sydney	Team
Bronze medal – third place	2004 Athens	Team

World Championships
Gold medal – first place	1993 Sweden	Team
Gold medal – first place	1997 Japan	Team
Silver medal – second place	1999 Egypt	Team

European Championships
Gold medal – first place	1996 Spain	Team
Silver medal – second place	1994 Portugal	Team
Silver medal – second place	2000 Croatia	Team

Andrey Ivanovich Lavrov (Russian: Андрей Иванович Лавров; born March 26, 1962, in Krasnodar) is a Russian former handball goalkeeper and a three-time Olympic gold medalist.

Lavrov is also one of only a few athletes to have won Olympic gold medals for three different teams, clinching gold for the Soviet Union in 1988, the Unified Team in 1992, and for Russia in 2000. Four years later, at the age of 42, he won his fourth Olympic medal, another unique feat for a handball player, when his Russian team earned third place and the bronze medals at the 2004 Athens Olympic Games.

Lavrov was a long-time captain for the Russian handball team, and served as the flagbearer for the Russian athletes at the opening ceremony of the Sydney Summer Olympics.

Lavrov has also won two World Championships for Russia, in 1993 and in 1997, as well as the European Championship in 1996.

In 2001, Andrey Lavrov was voted "Russian handball player of the century" in his home country.

== Post-playing career ==
After his playing career Lavrov has worked for the Russian Ministry of sports to promote handball, together with his friend and national team colleague Aleksandr Tuchkin.

From 2005 to 2011, Lavrov served as a Ryazan Oblast representative at the Federation Council.

== See also ==
- List of athletes with the most appearances at Olympic Games

Olympic Games
Preceded by Aleksandr Karelin	Flagbearer for Russia; Sidney 2000	Succeeded by Aleksandr Popov
