= 1997 World Men's Handball Championship =

1997年男子世界ハンドボール選手権大会

Tournament details
- Host country: Japan
- Venues: 4 (in 3 host cities)
- Dates: 16 May–1 June
- Teams: 24

Final positions
- Champions: Russia (2nd title)
- Runners-up: Sweden
- Third place: France
- Fourth place: Hungary

Tournament statistics
- Matches played: 80
- Goals scored: 3,741 (46.76 per match)
- Top scorer: Yoon Kyung-shin (KOR) 62 (12)

Awards
- Best player: Talant Duyshebaev (ESP)

The 1997 World Men's Handball Championship was the 15th team handball World Championship. It was held in Kumamoto, Japan and was the first World Championship not played in a European country. Russia won the championship.

== Qualification ==
| Competition | Dates | Vacancies | Qualified |
|---|---|---|---|
| Host nation | | 1 | Japan |
| 1995 World Men's Handball Championship | 7–21 May 1995 | 1 | France |
| Handball at the 1996 Summer Olympics – Men's tournament | 24 July – 4 August 1996 | 1 | Croatia |
| 1996 European Men's Handball Championship | 24 May – 2 June 1996 | 4 | Russia; Spain; FR Yugoslavia; Sweden |
| 1996 Pan American Men's Handball Championship | 8–13 October 1996 | 3 | Cuba; Argentina; Brazil |
| 1996 African Men's Handball Championship | 16–29 October 1996 | 4 | Algeria; Tunisia; Egypt; Morocco |
| European qualification | 20 August – 1 December 1996 | 6 | Czech Republic; Hungary; Iceland; Italy; Norway; Portugal |
| Asian qualification | 30 September – 4 December 1996 | 3 | Saudi Arabia; China; South Korea |
| EHF v OCHF Play-off | 31 January – 2 February 1997 | 1 | Lithuania |

== Venues ==
The organizing committee used four venues to host the 1997 World Men's Handball Championship:

- Group A: Park Dome Kumamoto
- Group B: Kumamoto City Gym
- Group C: Yamaga City Gym
- Group D: Yatsushiro City Gym

== Preliminary round ==
The top four teams from each group continue to the knockout stage. The teams are ranked through the following rules.

1. Team with the most points (2 points for each won game, 1 point for each drawn game).
2. If two teams get the same points, the winner in the game between the two teams get ranked first.
3. If the game between the teams ended in a draw, the team with the best goal difference get ranked first.

=== Group A ===
| Pos | Team | Pld | W | D | L | GF | GA | GD | Pts | Qualification |
|---|---|---|---|---|---|---|---|---|---|---|
| 1 | Iceland | 5 | 4 | 1 | 0 | 124 | 106 | +18 | 9 | Round of 16 |
| 2 | FR Yugoslavia | 5 | 4 | 0 | 1 | 129 | 111 | +18 | 8 | Round of 16 |
| 3 | Lithuania | 5 | 2 | 1 | 2 | 110 | 102 | +8 | 5 | Round of 16 |
| 4 | Japan | 5 | 2 | 0 | 3 | 101 | 104 | −3 | 4 | Round of 16 |
| 5 | Algeria | 5 | 1 | 2 | 2 | 103 | 112 | −9 | 4 | |
| 6 | Saudi Arabia | 5 | 0 | 0 | 5 | 94 | 126 | −32 | 0 | |

| 17 May; 19:30 | Iceland | 24 – 20 | Japan | Park Dome, Kumamoto |
| 17 May; 19:30 | | (14-10) | | Park Dome, Kumamoto |

| 18 May; 15:00 | Saudi Arabia | 18 – 27 | Lithuania | Park Dome, Kumamoto |
| 18 May; 15:00 | | (6-12) | | Park Dome, Kumamoto |

| 18 May; 17:00 | FR Yugoslavia | 22 – 19 | Japan | Park Dome, Kumamoto |
| 18 May; 17:00 | | (9-7) | | Park Dome, Kumamoto |

| 18 May; 19:00 | Algeria | 27 – 27 | Iceland | Park Dome, Kumamoto |
| 18 May; 19:00 | | (13-15) | | Park Dome, Kumamoto |

| 19 May; 13:00 | FR Yugoslavia | 29 – 21 | Lithuania | Park Dome, Kumamoto |
| 19 May; 13:00 | | (17-10) | | Park Dome, Kumamoto |

| 19 May; 15:00 | Algeria | 19 – 14 | Saudi Arabia | Park Dome, Kumamoto |
| 19 May; 15:00 | | (6-3) | | Park Dome, Kumamoto |

| 21 May; 19:00 | Japan | 23 – 20 | Saudi Arabia | Park Dome, Kumamoto |
| 21 May; 19:00 | | (15-10) | | Park Dome, Kumamoto |

| 22 May; 13:00 | Lithuania | 19 – 19 | Algeria | Park Dome, Kumamoto |
| 22 May; 13:00 | | (10-10) | | Park Dome, Kumamoto |

| 22 May; 15:00 | Iceland | 27 – 18 | FR Yugoslavia | Park Dome, Kumamoto |
| 22 May; 15:00 | | (11-9) | | Park Dome, Kumamoto |

| 24 May; 15:00 | Saudi Arabia | 20 – 32 | FR Yugoslavia | Park Dome, Kumamoto |
| 24 May; 15:00 | | (11-15) | | Park Dome, Kumamoto |

| 24 May; 17:00 | Algeria | 14 – 24 | Japan | Park Dome, Kumamoto |
| 24 May; 17:00 | | (4-13) | | Park Dome, Kumamoto |

| 24 May; 19:00 | Lithuania | 19 – 21 | Iceland | Park Dome, Kumamoto |
| 24 May; 19:00 | | (8-10) | | Park Dome, Kumamoto |

| 25 May; 15:00 | Saudi Arabia | 22 – 25 | Iceland | Park Dome, Kumamoto |
| 25 May; 15:00 | | (12-15) | | Park Dome, Kumamoto |

| 25 May; 17:00 | Japan | 15 – 24 | Lithuania | Park Dome, Kumamoto |
| 25 May; 17:00 | | (7-11) | | Park Dome, Kumamoto |

| 25 May; 19:00 | FR Yugoslavia | 28 – 24 | Algeria | Park Dome, Kumamoto |
| 25 May; 19:00 | | (14-12) | | Park Dome, Kumamoto |

=== Group B ===
| Pos | Team | Pld | W | D | L | GF | GA | GD | Pts | Qualification |
|---|---|---|---|---|---|---|---|---|---|---|
| 1 | France | 5 | 4 | 0 | 1 | 127 | 114 | +13 | 8 | Round of 16 |
| 2 | Sweden | 5 | 4 | 0 | 1 | 141 | 101 | +40 | 8 | Round of 16 |
| 3 | South Korea | 5 | 3 | 1 | 1 | 128 | 127 | +1 | 7 | Round of 16 |
| 4 | Norway | 5 | 1 | 2 | 2 | 104 | 109 | −5 | 4 | Round of 16 |
| 5 | Italy | 5 | 1 | 1 | 3 | 100 | 105 | −5 | 3 | |
| 6 | Argentina | 5 | 0 | 0 | 5 | 96 | 140 | −44 | 0 | |

| 18 May; 15:00 | France | 25 – 21 | Italy | City gym, Kumamoto |
| 18 May; 15:00 | | (12-10) | | City gym, Kumamoto |

| 18 May; 17:00 | Norway | 21 – 21 | South Korea | City gym, Kumamoto |
| 18 May; 17:00 | | (11-8) | | City gym, Kumamoto |

| 18 May; 19:00 | Sweden | 36 – 17 | Argentina | City gym, Kumamoto |
| 18 May; 19:00 | | (17-6) | | City gym, Kumamoto |

| 20 May; 13:00 | France | 26 – 27 | South Korea | City gym, Kumamoto |
| 20 May; 13:00 | | (18-11) | | City gym, Kumamoto |

| 20 May; 15:00 | Sweden | 24 – 17 | Norway | City gym, Kumamoto |
| 20 May; 15:00 | | (12-8) | | City gym, Kumamoto |

| 21 May; 18:00 | Italy | 19 – 19 | Norway | City gym, Kumamoto |
| 21 May; 18:00 | | (10-9) | | City gym, Kumamoto |

| 21 May; 20:00 | Argentina | 20 – 24 | France | City gym, Kumamoto |
| 21 May; 20:00 | | (8-12) | | City gym, Kumamoto |

| 22 May; 13:00 | Argentina | 15 – 21 | Italy | City gym, Kumamoto |
| 22 May; 13:00 | | (3-10) | | City gym, Kumamoto |

| 22 May; 15:00 | South Korea | 21 – 36 | Sweden | City gym, Kumamoto |
| 22 May; 15:00 | | (9-21) | | City gym, Kumamoto |

| 24 May; 15:00 | South Korea | 32 – 22 | Argentina | City gym, Kumamoto |
| 24 May; 15:00 | | (19-13) | | City gym, Kumamoto |

| 24 May; 17:00 | Norway | 20 – 23 | France | City gym, Kumamoto |
| 24 May; 17:00 | | (10-11) | | City gym, Kumamoto |

| 24 May; 19:00 | Sweden | 19 – 17 | Italy | City gym, Kumamoto |
| 24 May; 19:00 | | (8-10) | | City gym, Kumamoto |

| 25 May; 15:00 | Italy | 22 – 27 | South Korea | City gym, Kumamoto |
| 25 May; 15:00 | | (9-12) | | City gym, Kumamoto |

| 25 May; 17:00 | Norway | 27 – 22 | Argentina | City gym, Kumamoto |
| 25 May; 17:00 | | (14-9) | | City gym, Kumamoto |

| 25 May; 19:00 | France | 29 – 26 | Sweden | City gym, Kumamoto |
| 25 May; 19:00 | | (12-14) | | City gym, Kumamoto |

=== Group C ===
| Pos | Team | Pld | W | D | L | GF | GA | GD | Pts | Qualification |
|---|---|---|---|---|---|---|---|---|---|---|
| 1 | Spain | 5 | 4 | 1 | 0 | 141 | 103 | +38 | 9 | Round of 16 |
| 2 | Egypt | 5 | 4 | 1 | 0 | 129 | 94 | +35 | 9 | Round of 16 |
| 3 | Czech Republic | 5 | 3 | 0 | 2 | 119 | 105 | +14 | 6 | Round of 16 |
| 4 | Tunisia | 5 | 2 | 0 | 3 | 92 | 108 | −16 | 4 | Round of 16 |
| 5 | Portugal | 5 | 1 | 0 | 4 | 119 | 123 | −4 | 2 | |
| 6 | Brazil | 5 | 0 | 0 | 5 | 65 | 132 | −67 | 0 | |

| 18 May; 15:00 | Portugal | 26 – 18 | Brazil | City gym, Yamaga |
| 18 May; 15:00 | | (13-7) | | City gym, Yamaga |

| 18 May; 17:00 | Czech Republic | 22 – 24 | Egypt | City gym, Yamaga |
| 18 May; 17:00 | | (11-12) | | City gym, Yamaga |

| 18 May; 19:00 | Spain | 32 – 21 | Tunisia | City gym, Yamaga |
| 18 May; 19:00 | | (13-11) | | City gym, Yamaga |

| 20 May; 13:00 | Brazil | 10 – 24 | Czech Republic | City gym, Yamaga |
| 20 May; 13:00 | | (6-12) | | City gym, Yamaga |

| 20 May; 15:00 | Egypt | 19 – 19 | Spain | City gym, Yamaga |
| 20 May; 15:00 | | (11-10) | | City gym, Yamaga |

| 21 May; 18:00 | Tunisia | 19 – 18 | Portugal | City gym, Yamaga |
| 21 May; 18:00 | | (9-7) | | City gym, Yamaga |

| 21 May; 20:00 | Spain | 32 – 11 | Brazil | City gym, Yamaga |
| 21 May; 20:00 | | (15-3) | | City gym, Yamaga |

| 22 May; 13:00 | Egypt | 24 – 17 | Tunisia | City gym, Yamaga |
| 22 May; 13:00 | | (12-8) | | City gym, Yamaga |

| 22 May; 15:00 | Czech Republic | 28 – 24 | Portugal | City gym, Yamaga |
| 22 May; 15:00 | | (14-11) | | City gym, Yamaga |

| 24 May; 15:00 | Brazil | 11 – 33 | Egypt | City gym, Yamaga |
| 24 May; 15:00 | | (4-18) | | City gym, Yamaga |

| 24 May; 17:00 | Czech Republic | 19 – 18 | Tunisia | City gym, Yamaga |
| 24 May; 17:00 | | (10-12) | | City gym, Yamaga |

| 24 May; 19:00 | Portugal | 26 – 29 | Spain | City gym, Yamaga |
| 24 May; 19:00 | | (11-12) | | City gym, Yamaga |

| 25 May; 15:00 | Tunisia | 17 – 15 | Brazil | City gym, Yamaga |
| 25 May; 15:00 | | (11-6) | | City gym, Yamaga |

| 25 May; 17:00 | Portugal | 25 – 29 | Egypt | City gym, Yamaga |
| 25 May; 17:00 | | (14-12) | | City gym, Yamaga |

| 25 May; 19:00 | Spain | 29 – 26 | Czech Republic | City gym, Yamaga |
| 25 May; 19:00 | | (13-11) | | City gym, Yamaga |

=== Group D ===
| Pos | Team | Pld | W | D | L | GF | GA | GD | Pts | Qualification |
|---|---|---|---|---|---|---|---|---|---|---|
| 1 | Russia | 5 | 5 | 0 | 0 | 150 | 84 | +66 | 10 | Round of 16 |
| 2 | Hungary | 5 | 4 | 0 | 1 | 128 | 103 | +25 | 8 | Round of 16 |
| 3 | Cuba | 5 | 2 | 1 | 2 | 128 | 117 | +11 | 5 | Round of 16 |
| 4 | Croatia | 5 | 2 | 1 | 2 | 123 | 115 | +8 | 5 | Round of 16 |
| 5 | China | 5 | 1 | 0 | 4 | 101 | 160 | −59 | 2 | |
| 6 | Morocco | 5 | 0 | 0 | 5 | 90 | 141 | −51 | 0 | |

| 18 May; 15:00 | Russia | 31 – 17 | Cuba | City gym, Yatsushiro |
| 18 May; 15:00 | | (17-9) | | City gym, Yatsushiro |

| 18 May; 17:00 | Croatia | 34 – 21 | China | City gym, Yatsushiro |
| 18 May; 17:00 | | (17-9) | | City gym, Yatsushiro |

| 18 May; 19:00 | Hungary | 25 – 19 | Morocco | City gym, Yatsushiro |
| 18 May; 19:00 | | (10-8) | | City gym, Yatsushiro |

| 19 May; 13:00 | China | 15 – 34 | Russia | City gym, Yatsushiro |
| 19 May; 13:00 | | (6-20) | | City gym, Yatsushiro |

| 19 May; 15:00 | Morocco | 17 – 26 | Croatia | City gym, Yatsushiro |
| 19 May; 15:00 | | (7-14) | | City gym, Yatsushiro |

| 21 May; 18:00 | Russia | 30 – 13 | Morocco | City gym, Yatsushiro |
| 21 May; 18:00 | | (14-7) | | City gym, Yatsushiro |

| 21 May; 20:00 | Cuba | 21 – 22 | Hungary | City gym, Yatsushiro |
| 21 May; 20:00 | | (8-11) | | City gym, Yatsushiro |

| 22 May; 13:00 | China | 21 – 32 | Cuba | City gym, Yatsushiro |
| 22 May; 13:00 | | (9-19) | | City gym, Yatsushiro |

| 22 May; 15:00 | Croatia | 20 – 23 | Hungary | City gym, Yatsushiro |
| 22 May; 15:00 | | (10-8) | | City gym, Yatsushiro |

| 24 May; 15:00 | Morocco | 21 – 25 | China | City gym, Yatsushiro |
| 24 May; 15:00 | | (8-13) | | City gym, Yatsushiro |

| 24 May; 17:00 | Croatia | 23 – 23 | Cuba | City gym, Yatsushiro |
| 24 May; 17:00 | | (13-13) | | City gym, Yatsushiro |

| 24 May; 19:00 | Hungary | 19 – 24 | Russia | City gym, Yatsushiro |
| 24 May; 19:00 | | (7-13) | | City gym, Yatsushiro |

| 25 May; 15:00 | Cuba | 35 – 20 | Morocco | City gym, Yatsushiro |
| 25 May; 15:00 | | (17-16) | | City gym, Yatsushiro |

| 25 May; 17:00 | Hungary | 39 – 19 | China | City gym, Yatsushiro |
| 25 May; 17:00 | | (20-12) | | City gym, Yatsushiro |

| 25 May; 19:00 | Russia | 31 – 20 | Croatia | City gym, Yatsushiro |
| 25 May; 19:00 | | (15-7) | | City gym, Yatsushiro |

== Final round ==
=== Bracket ===
Round of 16
A1 | Iceland | 32
B4 | Norway | 28
C3 | Czech Republic | 19
D2 | Hungary | 20
C1 | Spain | 31
D4 | Croatia | 25
A3 | Lithuania | 20
B2 | Sweden | 32
D3 | Cuba | 20
C2 | Egypt | 24
B1 | France | 22
A4 | Japan | 21
B3 | South Korea | 37
A2 | FR Yugoslavia | 33
D1 | Russia | 20
C4 | Tunisia | 14

Quarterfinals
A1 | Iceland | 25
D2 | Hungary | 26
C1 | Spain | 24
B2 | Sweden | 28
C2 | Egypt | 19
B1 | France | 22
B3 | South Korea | 15
D1 | Russia | 32

Semifinals
D2 | Hungary | 19
B2 | Sweden | 31
B1 | France | 24
D1 | Russia | 25

Final
B2 | Sweden | 21
D1 | Russia | 23
Third place
D2 | Hungary | 27
B1 | France | 28

5-8th place semifinals
A1 | Iceland | 32
C1 | Spain | 23
C2 | Egypt | 28
B3 | South Korea | 27

5th place
A1 | Iceland | 23
C2 | Egypt | 20
7th place
C1 | Spain | 33
B3 | South Korea | 26

=== Round of 16 ===
| 27 May; 13:00 | Iceland | 32 – 28 | Norway | Park Dome, Kumamoto |
| 27 May; 13:00 | | (13-15) | | Park Dome, Kumamoto |

| 27 May; 13:00 | Spain | 31 – 25 | Croatia | City gym, Kumamoto |
| 27 May; 13:00 | | (16-14) | | City gym, Kumamoto |

27 May
15:00
South Korea
37 – 33 (ET)
FR Yugoslavia
Park Dome, Kumamoto

(12-13)

FT: 30-30 ET: 7-3

| 27 May; 15:00 | Cuba | 20 – 24 | Egypt | City gym, Kumamoto |
| 27 May; 15:00 | | (9-10) | | City gym, Kumamoto |

| 27 May; 18:00 | Lithuania | 20 – 32 | Sweden | Park Dome, Kumamoto |
| 27 May; 18:00 | | (9-18) | | Park Dome, Kumamoto |

| 27 May; 18:00 | Czech Republic | 19 – 20 | Hungary | City gym, Kumamoto |
| 27 May; 18:00 | | (9-11) | | City gym, Kumamoto |

| 27 May; 20:00 | France | 22 – 21 | Japan | Park Dome, Kumamoto |
| 27 May; 20:00 | | (11-11) | | Park Dome, Kumamoto |

| 27 May; 20:00 | Russia | 20 – 14 | Tunisia | City gym, Kumamoto |
| 27 May; 20:00 | | (12-5) | | City gym, Kumamoto |

=== Quarter-finals ===
| 29 May; 18:00 | Iceland | 25 – 26 | Hungary | Park Dome, Kumamoto |
| 29 May; 18:00 | | (11-14) | | Park Dome, Kumamoto |

29 May
18:00
Spain
24 – 28 (ET)
Sweden
City gym, Kumamoto

(12-12)

FT: 21-21 ET: 3-7

| 29 May; 20:00 | South Korea | 15 – 32 | Russia | Park Dome, Kumamoto |
| 29 May; 20:00 | | (6-16) | | Park Dome, Kumamoto |

| 29 May; 20:00 | Egypt | 19 – 22 | France | City gym, Kumamoto |
| 29 May; 20:00 | | (8-13) | | City gym, Kumamoto |

=== Placement matches ===
| 30 May; 13:00 | Spain | 23 – 32 | Iceland | Park Dome, Kumamoto |
| 30 May; 13:00 | | (11-11) | | Park Dome, Kumamoto |

| 30 May; 15:00 | South Korea | 27 – 28 | Egypt | Park Dome, Kumamoto |
| 30 May; 15:00 | | (11-15) | | Park Dome, Kumamoto |

=== 7th place match ===
| 31 May; 16:00 | Spain | 33 – 26 | South Korea | City gym, Kumamoto |
| 31 May; 16:00 | | (17-12) | | City gym, Kumamoto |

=== 5th place match ===
| 31 May; 16:00 | Egypt | 20 – 23 | Iceland | Park Dome, Kumamoto |
| 31 May; 16:00 | | (9-10) | | Park Dome, Kumamoto |

=== Semi-finals ===
| 31 May; 18:00 | Hungary | 19 – 31 | Sweden | Park Dome, Kumamoto |
| 31 May; 18:00 | | (7-14) | | Park Dome, Kumamoto |

31 May
18:00
France
24 – 25 (ET)
Russia
City gym, Kumamoto

(12-14)

FT: 21-21 ET: 3-4

=== Bronze final ===
| 1 June; 14:00 | France | 28 – 27 | Hungary | Park Dome, Kumamoto |
| 1 June; 14:00 | | (15-12) | | Park Dome, Kumamoto |

=== Final ===
| 1 June; 16:00 | Sweden | 21 – 23 | Russia | Park Dome, Kumamoto; Attendance: 11,100 |
| 1 June; 16:00 | | (10-11) | | Park Dome, Kumamoto; Attendance: 11,100 |
| 1 June; 16:00 | | Report | | Park Dome, Kumamoto; Attendance: 11,100 |

== Final standings ==
1. Russia
2. Sweden
3. France
4. Hungary
5. Iceland
6. Egypt
7. Spain
8. South Korea
9. FR Yugoslavia
10. Lithuania
11. Czech Republic
12. Norway
13. Croatia
14. Cuba
15. Japan
16. Tunisia
17. Algeria
18. Italy
19. Portugal
20. China
21. Saudi Arabia
22. Argentina
23. Morocco
24. Brazil

== Medalists ==
| Gold | Silver | Bronze |
| Russia: Andrey Lavrov; Pavel Sukosyan; Vasily Kudinov; Vyacheslav Gorpishin; Dmitri Torgovanov; Stanislav Kulinchenko; Oleg Grebnev; Vyacheslav Atavin; Igor Lavrov; Oleg Kuleshov; Lev Voronin; Sergey Pogorelov; Eduard Koksharov; Valery Gopin; Denis Krivoshlykov Head coach: Mr. Vladimir Maksimov | Sweden: Magnus Andersson; Martin Frändesjö; Peter Gentzel; Robert Hedin; Ola Lindgren; Stefan Lövgren; Mats Olsson; Staffan Olsson; Johan Petersson; Tomas Sivertsson; Jan Stankiewicz; Tomas Svensson; Pierre Thorsson; Ljubomir Vranjes; Magnus Wislander Head coach: Mr. Bengt Johansson | France: Christian Gaudin; Bruno Martini; Francis Franck; Éric Amalou; Patrick Cazal; Stéphane Cordinier; Guillaume Gille; Stéphane Joulin; Philippe Julia; Guéric Kervadec; Bernard Latchimy; Yannick Reverdy; Jackson Richardson; Stéphane Stoecklin; Marc Wiltberger; Sémir Zuzo Head coach: Mr. Daniel Costantini |

== All Star Team ==
- Goalkeeper: Mats Olsson Sweden
- Left Wing: Valery Gopin Russia
- Left Back: Vasily Kudinov Russia
- Center Back: Talant Duyshebaev Spain
- Pivot: Guéric Kervadec France
- Right Back: Staffan Olsson Sweden
- Right Wing: Valdimar Grímsson Iceland
