= Igor Lavrov =

Russian handball player

Personal information
- Full name: Igor Viktorovich Lavrov
- Nationality: Russian
- Born: 4 June 1973 (age 53) Stavropol, Russian SFSR, USSR
- Height: 186 cm (73 in)

Sport
- Sport: Handball
- Position: Centre back

Youth career
- Years: Team
- 1981-1988: Stavropol

Senior clubs
- Years: Team
- 1988-1991: Stavropol
- 1991-1992: HC Kaustik Volgograd
- 1992-1998: CSKA Moscow
- 1998-2001: SG Flensburg-Handewitt
- 2001-2005: SG Wallau-Massenheim
- 2005-2007: HSV Hamburg
National team
Years	Team	Apps
–	Russia	165
Medal record
Representing Russia
Olympic Games
Gold medal – first place	2000 Sydney	Team
World Championships
Gold medal – first place	1997 Japan	Team
Silver medal – second place	1999 Egypt	Team
European Championships
Gold medal – first place	1996 Spain	Team

Igor Viktorovich Lavrov (Russian: Игорь Викторович Лавров, born 4 June 1973) is a Russian team handball player. He is an Olympic champion from 2000 in Sydney, World Champion from 1997, and European Champion from 1996.
