= Aleksey Kostygov =

Russian handball player

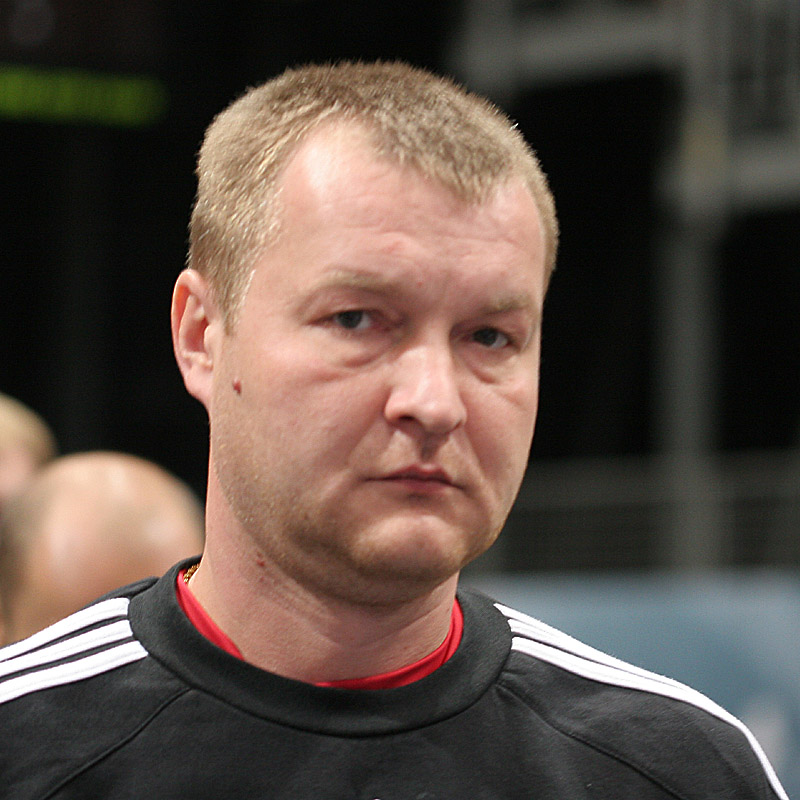
- Kostygov in 2008

Personal information
- Born: July 5, 1973 (age 53) Yaroslav, Russia
- Height: 190 cm (75 in)

Sport
- Sport: Handball
- Position: Goalkeeper

Youth career
- Years: Team
- –: Yaroslavl

Senior clubs
- Years: Team
- 1990-2004: HC Kaustik Volgograd
- 2004-2009: Chekhovskiye Medvedi
- 2009-2012: HC Neva
- 2012-2014: HC Kaustik Volgograd
- 2015-2015: SGAU-Saratov
National team
Years	Team	Apps	(Gls)
–	Russia	139	(1)
Medal record
Men's handball
Representing Russia
Olympic Games
Bronze medal – third place	2004 Athens	Team

Aleksey Veniaminovich Kostygov (Russian: Алексей Вениаминович Костыгов; born July 5, 1973) is a Russian handball player who competed in the 2004 Summer Olympics and in the 2008 Summer Olympics.

He was born in Yaroslavl.

In 2004 he was a member of the Russian team which won the bronze medal in the Olympic tournament. He played two matches as goalkeeper.

Four years later he finished sixth with the Russian team in the 2008 Olympic tournament. He played all eight matches as goalkeeper.
