= Pavel Bashkin =

Russian handball player

Pavel Yevgenyevich Bashkin
Personal information
- Nationality: Russian
- Born: 1 September 1978 (age 48) Astrakhan, Russia
- Height: 187 cm (74 in)

Sport
- Sport: Handball
- Position: Right Wing

Senior clubs
- Years: Team
- 1998–2006: HC Astrakhanochka
- 2006–2008: RK Gorenje Velenje
- 2008–2010: Naturhouse La Rioja
- 2010–2012: HC Meshkov Brest
National team
Years	Team	Apps	(Gls)
–	Russia	19	(46)
Medal record
Men's handball
Representing Russia
Olympic Games
Bronze medal – third place	2004 Athens	Team competition

Pavel Yevgenyevich Bashkin (Russian: Павел Евгеньевич Башкин, born September 1, 1978, in Astrakhan) is a Russian handball player who competed in the 2004 Summer Olympics. In 2004 he was a member of the Russian team which won the bronze medal in the Olympic tournament.
