= Martin Frändesjö =

Swedish handball player (born 1971)

Personal information
- Full name: Lars Gunnar Martin Frändesjö
- Nationality: Swedish
- Born: 18 July 1971 (age 55) Gothenburg, Sweden
- Height: 1.96 m (6 ft 5 in)

Sport
- Sport: Handball
- Position: Left wing
- Current club: Retired

Youth career
- Years: Team
- 1978-1986: Kärra HF
- 1986-1990: HP Warta

Senior clubs
- Years: Team
- 1990-1991: HP Warta
- 1991-1993: IK Sävehof
- 1993-1998: Redbergslids IK
- 1998-2000: GWD Minden
- 2000-2001: Montpellier Handball
- 2001: HSG Nordhorn
- 2001-2005: Redbergslids IK
- 2005-2007: IK Heim
- 2007: FCK Håndbold
- 2007-2008: Viking HK
National team
Years	Team	Apps	(Gls)
1994-2004	Sweden	165	(456)

Teams managed
- 2009-2011: HF Kroppskultur
- 2011-2013: Torslanda HK (youth)
- 2015-2018: Stavanger IF Håndball
Medal record
Olympic Games
Silver medal – second place	1996 Atlanta	Team
Silver medal – second place	2000 Sydney	Team
European Championship
Gold medal – first place	1994 Portugal
Gold medal – first place	1998 Italy
Gold medal – first place	2000 Croatia
Gold medal – first place	2002 Sweden
World Championship
Gold medal – first place	1999 Egypt
Silver medal – second place	1997 Japan
Silver medal – second place	2001 France
Bronze medal – third place	1995 Iceland

Lars Gunnar Martin Frändesjö (born 18 July 1971) is a Swedish handball player and coach. He won the European Championship four times and the World Championship once, and competed in the 1996 Summer Olympics and in the 2000 Summer Olympics, where he won silver medals on both occasions.

He has also worked as a handball expert on Swedish television.

== Career ==
Frändesjö started playing handball at the age of 7. In Sweden he played for Kärra HF, HP Warta, IK Sävehof and Redbergslids IK. With Redbergslids IK he won the Swedish championship in 1995, 1996, 1997 and 1998. In the summer of 1998 he joined German side GWD Minden. After a severe hit to the ribs during a Bundesliga game, he had to have his spleen removed in February 1999.

In the summer of 2000 he joined French side Montpellier Handball, but he did not manage to get a lot of playing time as Michaël Guigou were preferred at the club. Therefore, after only a year he returned to Germany to join HSG Nordhorn. Due to HSG Nordhorn's financial trouble they couldn't fulfill his contract and in already in September 2001 he returned to Redbergslids IK. Here he won the Swedish championship for a fifth time in 2003. In 2005 he joined league rivals IK Heim, where he signed a contract until 2007. He then joined Danish club FCK Håndbold in January 2007, where he played the rest of the season. After only half a season in Denmark he joined the Norwegian team Viking HK from Stavanger. He signed a three year contract wit with the club, but had to retire in November 2008 season due to knee issues.

In 1996 he was part of the Swedish handball team and won the silver medal in the Olympic tournament. He played one match and scored six goals. Four years later he was part of the Swedish team which won the silver medal again. He played five matches and scored 25 goals.

== Coaching career ==
In autumn 2009 he started coaching the HF Kroppskultur men's team who played in the Allsvenskan. In 2011 he missed the chance to get the team promoted to the Elitserien, and therefore his contract was not extended. From 2015 to 2018 he was both senior and youth coach at the Norwegian side Stavanger IF Håndball.

== Titles ==
Redbergslids IK:

- Swedish Champion: 1995, 1996, 1997, 1998, 2003

With the Swedish national team:

- European champion in 1994, 1998, 2000 and 2002
- World Champion at the 1999 World Championship
- Silver medals at the 1997, 2001
- Silver medals at the Olympics: 2000 and 1996 Olympics
- Bronze medals at the 1997 World Championship
