= Oleg Grebnev =

Russian handball player

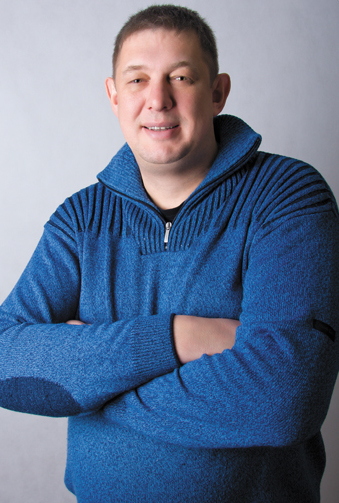
- Grebnev in 2013

Personal information
- Born: 4 February 1968 (age 58) Volgograd, Russian SFSR, Soviet Union
- Height: 206 cm (81 in)
- Weight: 110 kg (243 lb)

Sport
- Sport: Handball
- Position: pivot

Senior clubs
- Years: Team
- 1986–1988: CSKA Moscow
- 1988–1996: Kaustik Volgograd
- 1996–1998: HSV Düsseldorf
- 1998–2002: BM Ciudad Real
- 2002–2003: Dunaferr SE
- 2003: CB Gáldar
National team
- Years: Team
- 1988–1992: Soviet Union
- 1992–?: Russia
Medal record
Representing the Unified Team
Olympic Games
Gold medal – first place	1992 Barcelona	Team
Representing Russia
World Championships
Gold medal – first place	1993 Sweden	Team
Gold medal – first place	1997 Japan	Team
Silver medal – second place	1999 Egypt	Team
European Championships
Gold medal – first place	1996 Spain	Team
Silver medal – second place	1994 Portugal	Team
Silver medal – second place	2000 Croatia	Team

Oleg Gennadievich Grebnev (Russian: Олег Геннадьевич Гребнев, born 4 February 1968) is a retired Russian team handball player who competed at the 1992 and 1996 Summer Olympics. He won a gold medal in 1992 and finished fifth in 1996. He also won the world title in 1993 and 1997 and a European title in 1996. Since 2012 he has been the president of his hometown club HC Kaustik Volgograd.

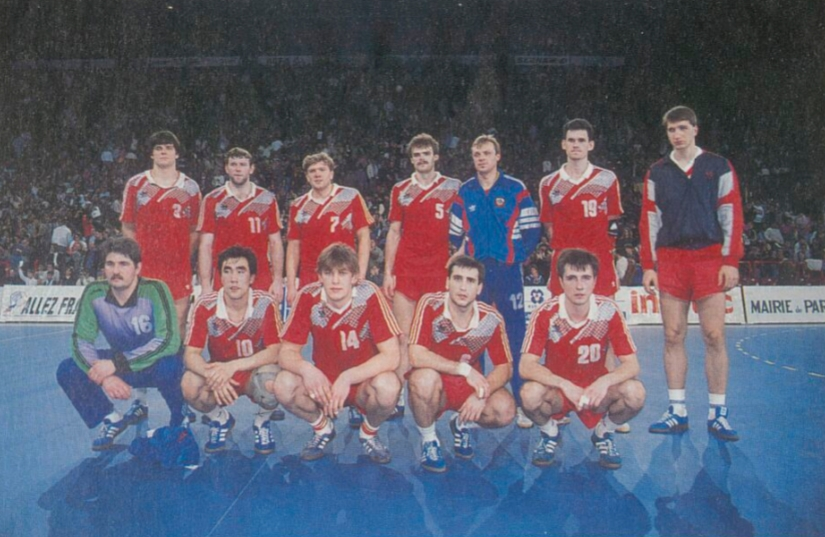
The CIS team in 1992

== Career ==
Grebnev started playing handball in Volgograd, but had his breakthrough during his time in the army, where he played for CSKA Moscow. Here he won the 1987 Soviet Championship and the 1987-88 EHF European Cup and 1987-88 EHF Cup Winners' Cup. From 1988 to 1996 he returned to play for his hometown club Kaustik Volgograd. In 1996 he moved to Germany and joined HSV Düsseldorf.

After 2 years he joined Spanish side BM Ciudad Real. Here he won the EHF Cup Winners' Cup in 2001-02. After 4 years in Spain he joined Hungarian Dunaferr SE. In March 2003 he returned to Spain to play a single month for BM Gáldar.

=== National team ===
Grebnev made his debut for the Soviet national team in 1988. At the 1992 Olympics he won gold medals at the Unified team.

After the dissolution of the Soviet Union he played for Russia, where he won the World Championship in 1993 and 1997. He also won gold medals at the 1996 European Championship.
