= Dmitri Torgovanov =

Russian handball player

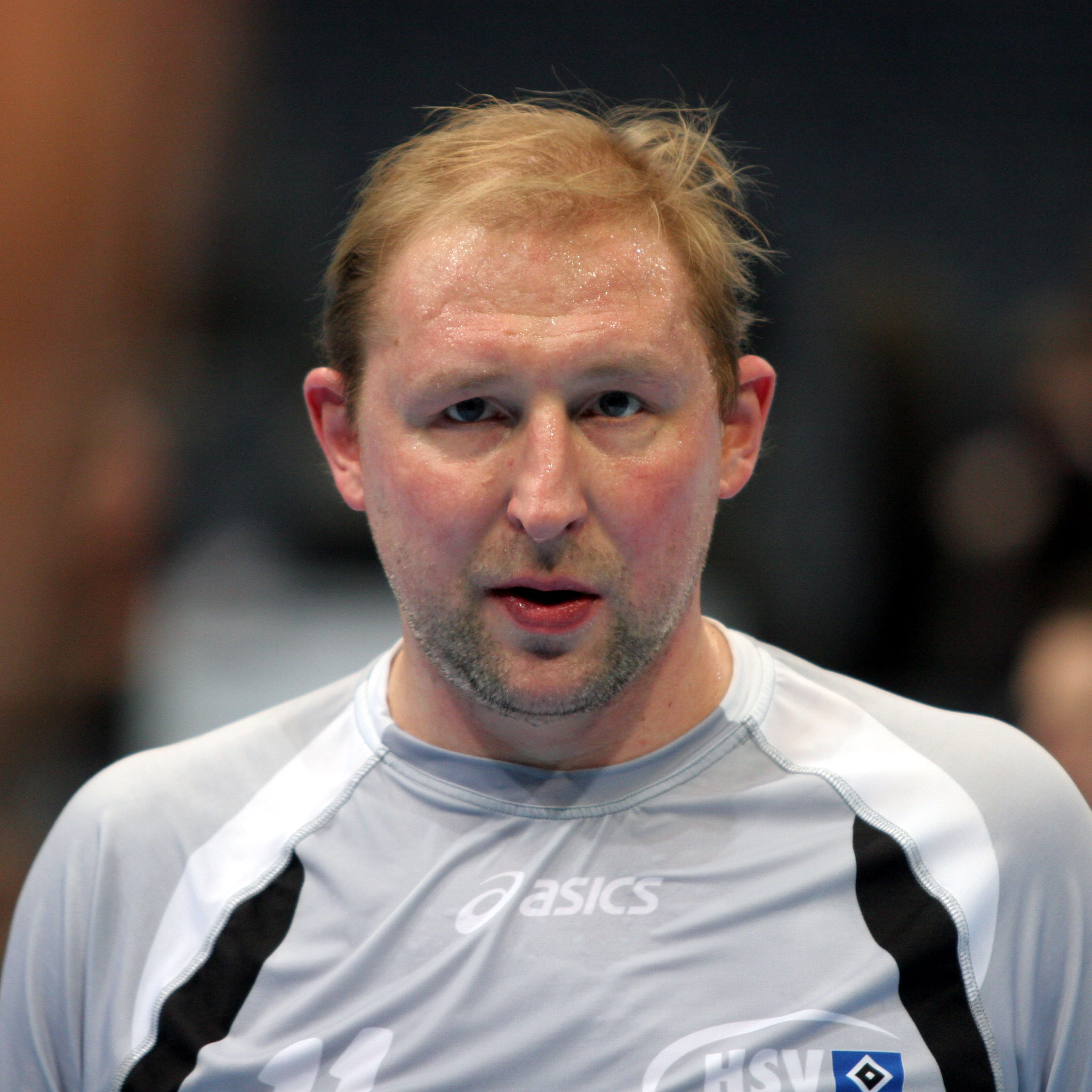

Personal information
- Nationality: Russian
- Born: 5 January 1972 (age 54) Krasnodar Krai, Russia
- Height: 1.96 m (6 ft 5 in)

Sport
- Sport: Handball
- Position: Pivot
- Current club: Neva (head coach)

Senior clubs
- Years: Team
- –1996: (Russia) Neva
- 1996–1999: (Germany) SG Wallau-Massenheim
- 1999–2001: (Germany) Solingen
- 2001–2005: (Germany) TUSEM Essen
- 2005–2007: (Germany) Rhein-Neckar Löwen
- 2007–2009: (Germany) HSV Hamburg
National team
- Years: Team
- 1992–2007: Russia

Teams managed
- 2009–: (Russia) Neva
- 2015–2017: Russia
Medal record
Men's handball
Representing Russia
Olympic Games
Gold medal – first place	2000 Sydney	Team competition
Bronze medal – third place	2004 Athens	Team competition
World Championships
Gold medal – first place	1993 Sweden	Team
Gold medal – first place	1997 Japan	Team
Silver medal – second place	1999 Egypt	Team
European Championships
Gold medal – first place	1996 Spain	Team
Silver medal – second place	1994 Portugal	Team
Silver medal – second place	2000 Croatia	Team

Dmitri Nikolaevich Torgovanov (Russian: Дмитрий Николаевич Торгованов; born 5 January 1972) is a former Russian handball player and Olympic Champion from 2000 in Sydney. He is currently a head coach for Neva. He was the head coach for the Russian national team between 2015 and 2017.

He received a bronze medal at the 2004 Summer Olympics in Athens with the Russian national team.
