= Denis Krivoshlykov =

Russian handball player

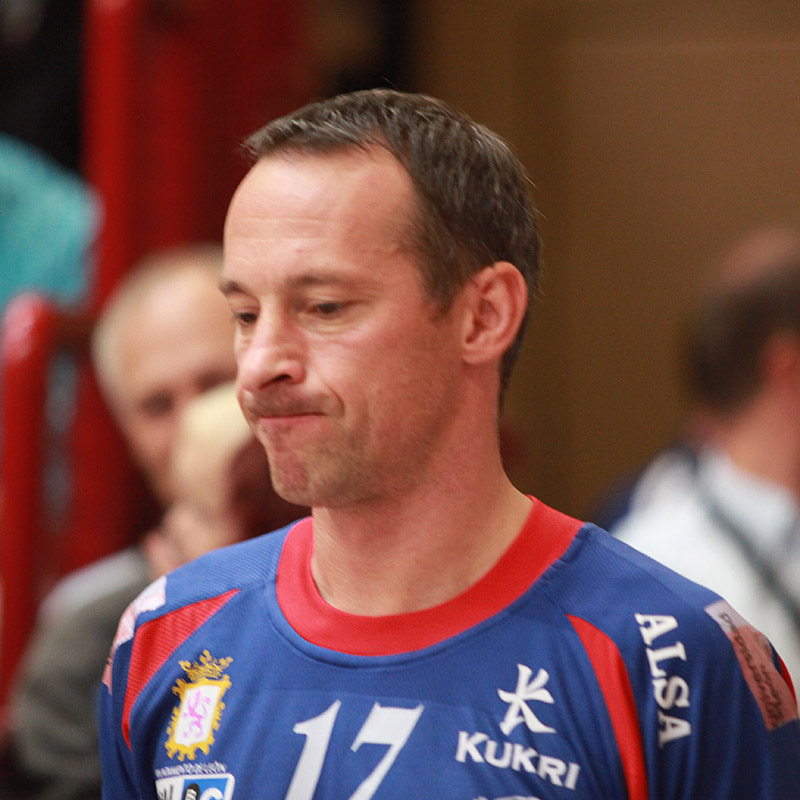
- Krivoshlykov in 2010

Personal information
- Full name: Denis Ivanovich Krivoshlykov
- Born: 10 May 1971 (age 55) Moscow, Soviet Union
- Height: 183 cm (72 in)

Sport
- Sport: Handball
- Position: Right wing

Senior clubs
- Years: Team
- -1999: CSKA Moscow
- 1999-2012: CB Ademar León
National team
Years	Team	Apps	(Gls)
–	Russia	158	(448)
Medal record
Representing Russia
Olympic Games
Gold medal – first place	2000 Sydney	Team
Bronze medal – third place	2004 Athens	Team
World Championships
Gold medal – first place	1997 Japan	Team
Silver medal – second place	1999 Egypt	Team
European Championships
Gold medal – first place	1996 Spain	Team
Silver medal – second place	2000 Croatia	Team

Denis Ivanovich Krivoshlykov (Russian: Денис Иванович Кривошлыков; born May 10, 1971, in Moscow) is a Russian team handball player and Olympic Champion from 2000 in Sydney. He received a bronze medal at the 2004 Summer Olympics in Athens with the Russian national team.

== Club career ==
Krivoshlykov started playing handball at CSKA Moscow. Here he won the 1994 and 1995 Russian Championship. In 1999 he was allowed by his coach Vladimir Maksimov to move abroad to further his development and he joined Spanish side CB Ademar León. Here he won the 2001 Liga ASOBAL and Copa del Rey and the 2005 EHF Cup Winners' Cup. He left the club after the 2011-12 season.

== National team ==
Krivoshlykov has played more than 150 games for Russia. He won the European Championship in 1996, the World Championship in 1997 and the Olympic gold in 2000.

At the 1999 World Championship and 2000 European Championship he won silver medals, and at the 2004 Olympics he won bronze medals.
