= Vyacheslav Gorpishin =

Russian handball player

Personal information
- Full name: Vyacheslav Nikolaevich Gorpishin
- Nationality: Russian
- Born: 20 January 1970 (age 56) Chișinău, Soviet Union
- Height: 200 cm (79 in)

Sport
- Sport: Handball

Youth career
- Years: Team
- –: DJuSSch Chișinău
- –: HBC CSKA Moscow

Senior clubs
- Years: Team
- -1995: HBC CSKA Moscow
- 1995-2000: HG Erlangen
- 2000-2003: SG Leutershausen
- 2003-2004: TSG Friesenheim
- 2004-2008: Eintracht Hildesheim
- 2008-2015: HF Springe
National team
Years	Team	
1992	Soviet Union	
1992-2004	Russia	270

Teams managed
- 2015-2023: HF Springe assistant
Medal record
Olympic Games
Gold medal – first place	2000 Sydney	Team competition
Bronze medal – third place	2004 Athens	Team competition
World Championship
Silver medal – second place	1999 Egypt	Team

Vyacheslav Nikolaevich Gorpishin (Russian: Вячеслав Николаевич Горпишин, born January 20, 1970) is a Russian team handball player and Olympic champion from 2000 in Sydney. He received a bronze medal at the 2004 Summer Olympics in Athens with the Russian national team.

He was a squad member on the Unified Team that won a gold medal at the 1992 Summer Olympics in Barcelona. But he did not play in a single match and did not receive a medal.

At the 1999 World Men's Handball Championship he won silver medals with Russia, losing to Sweden in the final.

== Club career ==
Gorpishin started playing handball at his hometown club in Chișinău. After showing talent he joined HBC CSKA Moscow, where he made his senior debut. Here he won the Russian Championship in 1994 and 1995.

He then sought a new challenge and joined HG Erlangen in the German Regionalliga. With Erlangen he was promoted to the 2. Bundesliga. After 5 years he joined SG Leutershausen.

In 2003 the team had financial trouble, and therefore he joined TSG Friesenheim. After a year he joined Eintracht Hildesheim. In 2006 he was promoted with the team to the Bundesliga, but was relegated again the year after.

After his contract had expired in 2008, he joined in the lower leagues.

After the 2014-15 season, when HF Springe was promoted to the 2nd Bundesliga he became the coach of the second team, as well as the assistant to the first team.
