= Vitali Ivanov =

Russian handball player

Medal record

Men's handball

Representing Russia

Olympic Games
Bronze medal – third place	2004 Athens	Team

Vitali Vladimirovich Ivanov (Russian: Виталий Владимирович Иванов, born February 3, 1976) is a retired Russian handball player who competed in the 2004 Summer Olympics and in the 2008 Summer Olympics.

He was born in Karl-Marx-Stadt, East Germany.

In 2004 he was a member of the Russian team which won the bronze medal in the Olympic tournament. He played all eight matches and scored 20 goals.

Four years later he finished sixth with the Russian team in the 2008 Olympic tournament. He played all eight matches again and scored five goals.
