= Russia men's national handball team =

Russia

Information
- Association: Handball Federation of Russia (Союз гандболистов России)
- Coach: Lev Voronin
- Assistant coach: Valentin Buzmakov; Mikhail Izmailov
- Captain: Daniil Shishkaryov
- Most caps: Aleksey Rastvortsev (251)
- Most goals: Eduard Koksharov (1110)

Colours
1st	2nd

Results

Summer Olympics
- Appearances: 4 (First in 1996)
- Best result: (gold) 1st (2000)

World Championship
- Appearances: 21 (First in 1993)
- Best result: (gold) 1st (1993, 1997)

European Championship
- Appearances: 14 (First in 1994)
- Best result: (gold) 1st (1996)
- Last updated on Unknown.

Russia men's national handball team
Medal record

Olympic Games
Gold medal – first place	2000 Sydney	Team
Bronze medal – third place	2004 Athens	Team

World Championship
Gold medal – first place	1993 Sweden	
Gold medal – first place	1997 Japan	
Silver medal – second place	1999 Egypt	

European Championship
Gold medal – first place	1996 Spain	
Silver medal – second place	1994 Portugal	
Silver medal – second place	2000 Croatia	

The Russia national handball team (Russian: Сборная России по гандболу, romanized: Sbornaya Rossii po gandbolu) is controlled by the Handball Federation of Russia. Russia is designates by IHF and EHF.

It has historically been considered one of the strongest national teams in the world, winning both the World Championship, European Championship and gold at the Olympic Games.

== History ==
Handball in Russia as one of the sports games appeared approx. in 1909. In the first period of its development the handball in Russia had two forms, 11 players form and 7 players form. In 1955 was set up the All-Union section (federation) of handball. By early 60s was finally approved a single form of handball game – 7 players form.

=== The Dissolution of the Soviet Union ===
The Russian national team was established after the Dissolution of the Soviet Union, when the Soviet Union men's national handball team was discontinued. The Handball Federation of Russia became the legal successor to the Soviet Union.

=== Initial success ===
The first major international tournament that Russia participated in was the 1993 World Men's Handball Championship, which they won. During the 1990's they became one of the best teams in the world, competing for that title with Sweden's 'Bengan Boys'. Russia won the 1996 European Men's Handball Championship and the handball tournament at the 2000 Olympics.

=== 2000s ===
Russia's early success would not continue, however. During the 2000's and 2010's they did not reach a final again, although they did win bronze medals at the 2004 Olympics. The culmination came at the 2011 World Men's Handball Championship, where Russia missed qualification for the first time ever (as either Russia or the Soviet Union). At their next major international tournament, the 2012 European Championship, they were knocked out in the preliminary round with a disappointing 15th place, leading to the firing of legendary coach Vladimir Maximov.

At the 2021 World Men's Handball Championship Russia could not compete under their own flag as the World Anti-Doping Agency had on 9 December 2019 banned Russia from all international sports, after the Russian government was found to have tampered with laboratory data that it provided to WADA in January 2019 as a condition of the Russian Anti-Doping Agency being reinstated. Therefore they competed as a neutral team under the name "Russian Handball Federation Team".

=== Russian invasion of Ukraine ===
In reaction to the 2022 Russian invasion of Ukraine, the International Handball Federation banned Russian athletes, and the European Handball Federation suspended all Russian clubs and the national team from competing in European handball competitions.

== Honours ==
Competition	1st place, gold medalist(s)	2nd place, silver medalist(s)	3rd place, bronze medalist(s)	Total
Olympic Games	1	0	1	2
World Championship	2	1	0	3
European Championship	1	2	0	3
Total	4	3	1	8

== Competitive record ==
=== Summer Olympics ===
Year	Round	Position	Pld	W	D	L	GS	GA
1972 – 1988	As Soviet Union							
(Spain) 1992	As Unified Team							
(United States) 1996	Preliminary round	5th	6	4	0	2	166	132
(Australia) 2000	Champions	1st	8	7	0	1	219	195
(Greece) 2004	Third place	3rd	8	4	0	4	214	216
(China) 2008	Quarter-finals	6th	8	3	1	4	216	214
(United Kingdom) 2012	Did not qualify							
(Brazil) 2016	Did not qualify							
(Japan) 2020	Did not qualify							
(France) 2024	Suspended							
(United States) 2028	Suspended							
(Australia) 2032	To be determined							
Total	4/9	1 Title	30	18	1	11	815	757

=== World Championship ===
1993	(Sweden)	Champions
1995	(Iceland)	5th place
1997	(Japan)	Champions
1999	(Egypt)	Runners-up
2001	(France)	6th place
2003	(Portugal)	5th place
2005	(Tunisia)	8th place
2007	(Germany)	6th place
2009	(Croatia)	16th place
2011	(Sweden)	Did not qualify
2013	(Spain)	7th place
2015	(Qatar)	19th place
2017	(France)	12th place
2019	(Germany) (Denmark)	14th place
2021	(Egypt)	14th place (played as RHF Team)
2023	(Poland) (Sweden)	Disqualified during qualification
2025	(Croatia) (Denmark) (Norway)	Suspended
2027	(Germany)	Suspended
2029	(France) (Germany)	TBD
2031	(Denmark) (Iceland) (Norway)	TBD

=== European Championship ===
Year	Round	Position	GP	W	D	L	GS	GA
(Portugal) 1994	Runners-up	2	7	6	0	1	172	148
(Spain) 1996	Champions	1	7	6	1	0	172	141
(Italy) 1998	Fourth place	4	7	3	1	3	179	167
(Croatia) 2000	Runners-up	2	7	5	0	2	189	175
(Sweden) 2002	5th/6th place	5	7	5	1	1	197	172
(Slovenia) 2004	5th/6th place	5	7	5	1	1	206	190
(Switzerland) 2006	5th/6th place	6	7	4	0	3	208	204
(Norway) 2008	Preliminary round	14	3	0	1	2	74	88
(Austria) 2010	Main round	12	6	1	0	5	177	194
(Serbia) 2012	Preliminary round	15	3	0	1	2	82	89
(Denmark) 2014	Main round	9	6	2	0	4	168	179
(Poland) 2016	Main round	9	6	2	1	3	160	161
(Croatia) 2018	Did not qualify							
(Austria) (Norway) (Sweden) 2020	Preliminary round	22	3	0	0	3	76	91
(Hungary) (Slovakia) 2022	Main round	9	7	3	1	3	194	190
(Germany) 2024	Disqualified during qualification							
(Denmark) (Norway) (Sweden) 2026	Suspended							
(Portugal) (Spain) (Switzerland) 2028	Suspended							
(Czech Republic) (Denmark) (Poland) 2030	Future event							
(France) (Germany) 2032	Future event							
Total	14/20	1 title	83	42	8	33	2254	2189

== Current squad ==
This is the list of players named for the friendly tournament in January, 2026.

Nr.	Name	Position	Club
1	Denis Zabolotin	Goalkeeper	(Belarus) HC Meshkov Brest
12	Ivan Sharov	Goalkeeper	(Russia) Saint Petersburg HC
55	Dmitriy Ionov	Left wing	(Russia) HBC CSKA Moscow
80	Ivan Osadchiy	Left wing	(Russia) SKIF Krasnodar
10	Ivan Erkanov	Right wing	(Russia) HBC CSKA Moscow
76	Andrey Volkhonsky	Right wing	(Russia) Permskie Medvedi
23	Ilya Belevtsov	Left back	(Russia) HBC CSKA Moscow
25	Evgeniy Dzemin	Left back	(Russia) Permskie Medvedi
99	Sergey Kosorotov	Left back	(Poland) Wisła Płock
4	Igor Karlov	Playmaker	(Slovakia) HT Tatran Prešov
45	Aleksandr Arkatov	Playmaker	(Russia) Permskie Medvedi
93	Anton Aksyukov	Right back	(Russia) Chekhovskiye Medvedi
98	Nikita Kamenev	Right back	(Russia) Permskie Medvedi
6	Victor Futsev	Pivot	(Russia) Chekhovskiye Medvedi
55	Aleksandr Ermakov	Pivot	(Russia) Chekhovskiye Medvedi
77	Raman Tsarapkin	Pivot	(Russia) HBC CSKA Moscow

=== Coaching staff ===
HUR Management Personnel:	Andrey Lavrov
Head Coach:	Velimir Petković
Coaches:	Valentin Buzmakov / Mikhail Izmailov
Videooperator:	Andrei Seregin

=== Notable players ===
- (Soviet Union) (Commonwealth of Independent States) (Russia) Andrey Lavrov
- (Commonwealth of Independent States) (Spain) Talant Dujshebaev
- (Russia) Pavel Sukosyan
- (Russia) Vyacheslav Gorpishin
- (Russia) Eduard Koksharov
- (Russia) Vasily Kudinov
- (Russia) Dmitry Filippov
- (Russia) Denis Krivoshlykov
- (Russia) Serguei Pogorelov
- (Russia) Dmitri Torgovanov
- (Russia) Aleksandr Tuchkin
- (Russia) Stanislav Kulinchenko
- (Russia) Valeri Gopin
- (Russia) Oleg Kisselev
- (Russia) Alexey Kamanin
- (Russia) Alexey Kostygov
- (Russia) Alexander Chernoivanov
- (Russia) Vitali Ivanov
- (Russia) Vasily Filippov
- (Russia) Lev Voronin
- (Russia) Vyacheslav Atavin
- (Russia) Oleg Grebnev
- (Russia) Pavel Bashkin

=== Statistics ===
==== Most capped players ====
Player	Games	Position	Years
Andrey Lavrov	320	GK	
Vyacheslav Atavin	288	OB	
Vyacheslav Gorpishin	270	?	
Alexey Rastvortsev	251	OB	
Vitali Ivanov	236	CB	
Eduard Koksharov	226	W	
Dmitri Torgovanov	219	P	
Dmitry Kovalyov	213	W	
Timur Dibirov	212	W	
Mikhail Chipurin	208	P	
Vasily Kudinov	196	OB	
Sergey Pogorelov	194	OB	
Dmitry Filippov	160+	CB, W	
Denis Krivoshlykov	158	W	
Oleg Grams	150	GK	
Pavel Sukosyan	145	GK	
Talant Duyshebaev	140	CB	
Egor Evdokimov	132	P	
Alexey Kostygov	131	GK	
Stanislav Kulinchenko	125	CB	
Daniil Shishkarev	122	W	
Dmitry Zhitnikov	119	CB	
Alexander Chernoivanov	116	P	
Samvel Aslanyan	111	OB	
Konstantin Igropulo	110	OB	
Pavel Atman	107	CB	
Vasily Filippov	101	CB	
Valery Gopin	100+	W	
Oleg Kiselyov	100+	CB, OB	
Oleg Grebnev	100+	P	

==== Top scorers ====
Player	Goals	Average	Position	Years
Eduard Koksharov	1110	4.91	W	
Alexey Rastvortsev	898	3.58	OB	
Talant Duyshebaev	726+		CB	
Dmitri Torgovanov	689	3.15	P	
Vyacheslav Atavin	600+		OB	
Timur Dibirov	600		W	
Vitali Ivanov	522	2.21	CB	
Konstantin Igropulo	505		OB	
Mikhail Chipurin	505		P	
Denis Krivoshlykov	448	2.84	W	
Sergey Pogorelov	446	2.30	OB	
Dmitry Kovalyov	439		W	
Vasily Kudinov	300+		OB	
Dmitry Filippov	300+		CB, W	
Aleksandr Tuchkin	299	3.25	OB	
