= Sergey Pogorelov =

Russian handball player (1974–2019)

Personal information
- Full name: Sergey Valentinovich Pogorelov
- Nationality: Russian
- Born: 2 June 1974 Volgograd, Russian SFSR
- Died: 24 April 2019 (aged 44) Volgograd, Russia
- Height: 2.01 m (6 ft 7 in)

Sport
- Sport: Handball
- Position: Right back

Senior clubs
- Years: Team
- –1999: HC Kaustik Volgograd
- 1999–2000: TBV Lemgo
- 2000–2001: ThSV Eisenach
- 2001–2005: BM Ciudad Real
- 2002–2003: → Villeurbanne (loan)
- 2003–2004: → Paris Saint-Germain (loan)
- 2004–2005: → BM Altea (loan)
- 2005–2008: Algeciras BM
- 2008: RK Metalurg Skopje
National team
Years	Team	Apps	(Gls)
1994–2005	Russia	194	(446)
Medal record
Men's handball
Representing Russia
Olympic Games
Gold medal – first place	2000 Sydney	Team
Bronze medal – third place	2004 Athens	Team
World Championships
Gold medal – first place	1997 Japan	Team
Silver medal – second place	1999 Egypt	Team
European Championships
Gold medal – first place	1996 Spain	Team
Silver medal – second place	2000 Croatia	Team

Sergey Valentinovich Pogorelov (Russian: Серге́й Валентинович Погорелов; June 2, 1974 in Volgograd – April 24, 2019 in Volgograd) was a Russian team handball player and Olympic champion from 2000 in Sydney. He received a bronze medal at the 2004 Summer Olympics in Athens with the Russian national team.
