= Pavel Sukosyan =

Russian handball player

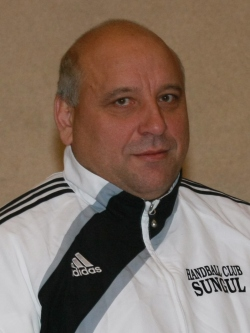

Personal information
- Nationality: Russian
- Born: 14 January 1962 (age 64) Krasnodar
- Height: 200 cm (79 in)

Sport
- Sport: Handball
- Position: Goalkeeper
National team
- Years: Team
- –: Soviet Union
- –: Russia
Medal record
Representing Russia
Men's handball
Olympic Games
Gold medal – first place	2000 Sydney	Team
World Championships
Gold medal – first place	1993 Sweden	Team
Gold medal – first place	1997 Japan	Team
Silver medal – second place	1999 Egypt	Team
European Championships
Gold medal – first place	1996 Spain	Team
Silver medal – second place	1994 Portugal	Team
Silver medal – second place	2000 Croatia	Team

Pavel Alekseyevich Sukosyan (Russian: Павел Алексеевич Сукосян; born 14 January 1962) is a Russian handball player.

He played for the Russia men's national handball team at the 2000 Summer Olympics in Sydney, where Russia won the gold medal.
