= Stanislav Kulinchenko =

Russian handball player

Personal information
- Full name: Stanislav Vladimirovich Kulinchenko
- Nationality: Russian
- Born: 19 April 1971 (age 55) Krasnogvardeyskaya, Samarqand Region; Uzbek SSR, Soviet Union
- Height: 190 cm (75 in)

Sport
- Sport: Handball
- Position: Centre back

Senior clubs
- Years: Team
- -1990: SKIF Krasnodar
- 1990-1996: Dinamo Chelyabinsk
- 1996-1998: HC Empor Rostock
- 1998-1999: TSG Bielefeld
- 1999-2000: Badel 1862 Zagreb
- 2000-2001: RK Celje
- 2001: SC Magdeburg
- 2000-2001: Honda Suzuka
- 2000-2001: Superfund Hard
National team
Years	Team	Apps
–	Russia	125
Medal record
Representing Russia
Men's handball
Olympic Games
Gold medal – first place	2000 Sydney	Team
World Championships
Gold medal – first place	1997 Japan	Team
Silver medal – second place	1999 Egypt	Team
European Championships
Gold medal – first place	1996 Spain	Team
Silver medal – second place	1994 Portugal	Team
Silver medal – second place	2000 Croatia	Team

Stanislav Vladimirovich Kulinchenko (Russian: Станислав Владимирович Кулинченко, born 19 April 1971) is a Russian former handball player.

He played for the Russia men's national handball team at the 2000 Summer Olympics in Sydney, where Russia won the gold medal.

== Club career ==
Kulinchenko started playing handball aged 10 in Krasnodar. His first senior club was SKIF Krasnodar followed by Dinamo Chelyabinsk.

In 1996 he moved to Germany to join HC Empor Rostock, where he played until 1998. He then joined TSG Bielefeld.

In 1999 he joined Croatian Badel 1862 Zagreb, where he won the Croatian championship and cup in 2000. Afterwards he joined Slovenian RK Celje, where he won the 2001 Slovenian Championship and Cup.

In the summer of 2001 he returned to Germany to join SC Magdeburg, but he left the team already in December the same year.

His next club was the Japanese club Honda Suzuka. Here he won the Championship in 2002, 2003 and 2004. In December 2004 he joined Austrian club Superfund Hard.

=== National team ===
With the Russian national team he won the 1997 World Championship, the 1996 European Championship and gold medals the 2000 Olympics. At the 1994 European Championship, 1999 World Championship and the 2000 European Championship he won silver medals.

== Post-playing career ==
From 2008 to 2014 Kulinchenko was the General director at the Russian club HC Kuban Krasnodar. Afterwards he has been the sporting director at the club's women's team.
