= Faliro Sports Pavilion Arena =

Sports stadium in Athens, Greece

Faliro Arena
- The Little Peace and Friendship Stadium; Tae-kwondo Arena
- Interactive map of Faliro Arena
- Location: Palaio Faliro, Greece
- Coordinates: 37°56′09.94″N 23°41′27.91″E
- Owner: Olympic Real Estates S.A.
- Capacity: 8,536 (for 2004 Olympics); 3,836 (current seating)

Construction
- Groundbreaking: June 2002
- Built: March 2003
- Opened: August 12, 2004
- Cost: €38 million euros (2002)
- Architects: Thymios Papagiannis and Associates

The Faliro Sports Pavilion Arena, which is part of the Faliro Coastal Zone Olympic Complex, is an indoor arena in the Athens southern suburb of Palaio Faliro, Greece, on the Saronic Gulf. It is nicknamed "The Little Peace And Friendship Stadium", due to its similarity in design and close proximity to the larger and older Peace and Friendship Stadium.

It was the site of the 2004 Athens Summer Olympics preliminary matches of handball, as well as the taekwondo competition. The arena seats 8,536 for handball matches of 2004 Olympics, though only 3,836 seats were made publicly available during the Olympics.

Today the arena regularly hosts concerts and other cultural and sports events, as well as congresses and conventions.

== History ==
View of arena from harbor

The arena was completed on December 20, 2003, and it officially opened on August 12, 2004, shortly before the 2004 Olympics began. In June 2010, the arena hosted the 7th MAD Video Music Awards, held by Mad TV, and hosted by Themis Georgantas. The Prodigy had a sold-out concert event at the arena. Tiesto performed at the arena, during his Kaleidoscope World Tour. The arena is also known as a long-time venue for Holiday on Ice shows. It also hosted the Greek Legends event by Riot Games, a League of Legends LAN tournament on June 28 and 29, 2014.

It hosted the finals of the League of Legends Greek Championship Season 1 in the 28th and 29 January 2017, co-organized by Riot Games, AST, and inSpot.

== See also ==
- List of indoor arenas in Greece
