= List of indoor arenas in Germany =

The following is a list of German indoor arenas. Indoor stadiums with a capacity of at least 2,000 are included.

== Existing arenas ==
Images	Stadium	Capacity	City	State	Home team	Opened
	LANXESS arena	19,250	Cologne	North Rhine-Westphalia	Kölner Haie	1998
	Uber Arena	14,500	Berlin	Berlin	Alba Berlin, Eisbären Berlin	2008
	SAP Arena	14,500	Mannheim	Baden-Württemberg	Rhein-Neckar Löwen, Adler Mannheim	2005
	PSD Bank Dome	14,282	Düsseldorf	North Rhine-Westphalia	Düsseldorfer EG, Bergischer HC (some games)	2006
	ÖVB Arena	14,000	Bremen	Bremen		1964
	Barclays Arena	13,000	Hamburg	Hamburg	Handball Sport Verein Hamburg^{1,} Hamburg Freezers (formerly)	2002
	Olympiahalle	12,463	Munich	Bavaria		1972
	Westfalenhallen	12,000	Dortmund	North Rhine-Westphalia		1952
	Max-Schmeling-Halle	12,000	Berlin	Berlin	Alba Berlin (formerly), Füchse Berlin, Berlin Recycling Volleys	1996
	OWL Arena	11,500	Halle (Westfalen)	North Rhine-Westphalia	Gerry Weber Open	1993
	SAP Garden	11,500	Munich	Bavaria	FC Bayern Munich^{1}, EHC Red Bull München	2024
	ZAG-Arena	10,767	Hannover	Lower Saxony	TSV Hannover-Burgdorf, Hannover Scorpions (formerly)	2000
	Rudolf Weber-Arena	12,650	Oberhausen	North Rhine-Westphalia	Revierlöwen Oberhausen (formerly)	1996
	Wunderino Arena	10,250	Kiel	Schleswig-Holstein	THW Kiel	1952
	Tennisstadion Hamburg	10,000	Hamburg	Hamburg	International German Open (1924−present), FIVB Beach Volleyball World Tour; 2019 Beach Volleyball World Championships	1892
	Festhalle Frankfurt	9,850	Frankfurt	Hesse		1909
	Yayla Arena	9,500	Krefeld	North Rhine-Westphalia	Krefeld Pinguine	2004
	Hanns-Martin-Schleyer-Halle	8,200	Stuttgart	Baden-Württemberg		1983
	PSD Bank Nürnberg Arena	8,200	Nuremberg	Bavaria	Nürnberg Ice Tigers, HC Erlangen	2001
	Quarterback Immobilien Arena	8,000	Leipzig	Saxony	SC DHfK Leipzig, HC Leipzig	2002
	GETEC Arena	7,782	Magdeburg	Saxony-Anhalt	SC Magdeburg	1997
	Porsche-Arena	7,500	Stuttgart	Baden-Württemberg	TVB 1898 Stuttgart, Porsche Tennis Grand Prix	2006
	Olympia-Eissport-Zentrum	7,000	Garmisch-Partenkirchen	Bavaria	SC Riessersee	1934
	Max Aicher Arena	7,000	Inzell	Bavaria	ISU Speed Skating World Cup	2011
	Alsterdorfer Sporthalle	7,000	Hamburg	Hamburg	Handball Sport Verein Hamburg^{1}	1968
	Eissporthalle Frankfurt	6,946	Frankfurt	Hesse	Löwen Frankfurt	1981
	Brose Arena	6,900	Bamberg	Bavaria	Bamberg Baskets	2001
	Curt-Frenzel-Stadion	6,757	Augsburg	Bavaria	Augsburger Panther	1936
	Rheinlandhalle	6,714	Krefeld	North Rhine-Westphalia	Krefeld Pinguine (formerly), DSC Krefeld	1955
	BMW Park	6,700	Munich	Bavaria	FC Bayern Munich^{1}	1972
	Volkswagen Halle	6,600	Braunschweig	Lower Saxony	Basketball Löwen Braunschweig	2000
	GP Joule Arena	6,300	Flensburg	Schleswig-Holstein	SG Flensburg-Handewitt	2001
	Helios Arena	6,300	Villingen-Schwenningen	Baden-Württemberg	Schwenninger Wild Wings	1976
	Olympia Eishalle	6,266	Munich	Bavaria		1967
	Probonio Arena	6,100	Kassel	Hesse	Kassel Huskies, MT Melsungen	1977
	EWE Arena	6,019	Oldenburg	Lower Saxony	EWE Baskets Oldenburg	2013
	Telekom Dome	6,000	Bonn	North Rhine-Westphalia	Telekom Baskets Bonn	2008
	ratiopharm arena	6,000	Neu-Ulm	Bavaria	Ratiopharm Ulm	2011
	Sport- und Kongresshalle	6,000	Schwerin	Mecklenburg-Vorpommern	Mecklenburger Stiere Schwerin	1962
	SWT-Arena	5,995	Trier	Rhineland-Palatinate	Gladiators Trier	2003
	Eisstadion am Pulverturm	5,940	Straubing	Bavaria	Straubing Tigers	1967
	Rofa-Stadion	5,900	Rosenheim	Bavaria	Starbulls Rosenheim	1961
	Echte Helden Arena	5,800	Freiburg im Breisgau	Baden-Württemberg	Wölfe Freiburg	1969
	Velodrom	5,688	Berlin	Berlin		1997
	EWS Arena	5,599	Göppingen	Baden-Württemberg	Frisch Auf Göppingen	1967
	Donau Arena	5,500	Regensburg	Bavaria	Eisbären Regensburg	1999
	MHPArena	5,325	Ludwigsburg	Baden-Württemberg	MHP Riesen Ludwigsburg, HB Ludwigsburg	2009
	Grugahalle	5,300	Essen	North Rhine-Westphalia		1958
	Eisstadion im Sahnpark	5,222	Crimmitschau	Saxony	Eispiraten Crimmitschau	1964
	Weser-Ems-Halle	5,118	Oldenburg	Lower Saxony	EWE Baskets Oldenburg^{1}	1954
	Süwag Energie ARENA	5,002	Frankfurt	Hesse	Skyliners Frankfurt, SG Wallau-Massenheim (formerly)	1988
	Phoenix Contact Arena	5,000	Lemgo	North Rhine-Westphalia	TBV Lemgo	1977
	Eissportzentrum Westfalenhallen	5,000	Dortmund	North Rhine-Westphalia	Eisadler Dortmund	1952
	Eisstadion an der Brehmstraße	3,363	Düsseldorf	North Rhine-Westphalia	Düsseldorfer EG (youth)	1935
	Eisstadion am Friedrichspark	2,500	Mannheim	Baden-Württemberg	Jungadler Mannheim	1939
	Eishalle Rostock	2,000	Rostock	Mecklenburg-Vorpommern	Rostock Piranhas	1970

Notes

- Note 1: Only selected games are played in the arena.

== See also ==
- List of football stadiums in Germany
- List of indoor arenas in Europe
- List of indoor arenas by capacity
- Lists of stadiums
