= Heristo Arena =

Multi-purpose stadium in Halle, North Rhine-Westphalia, Germany

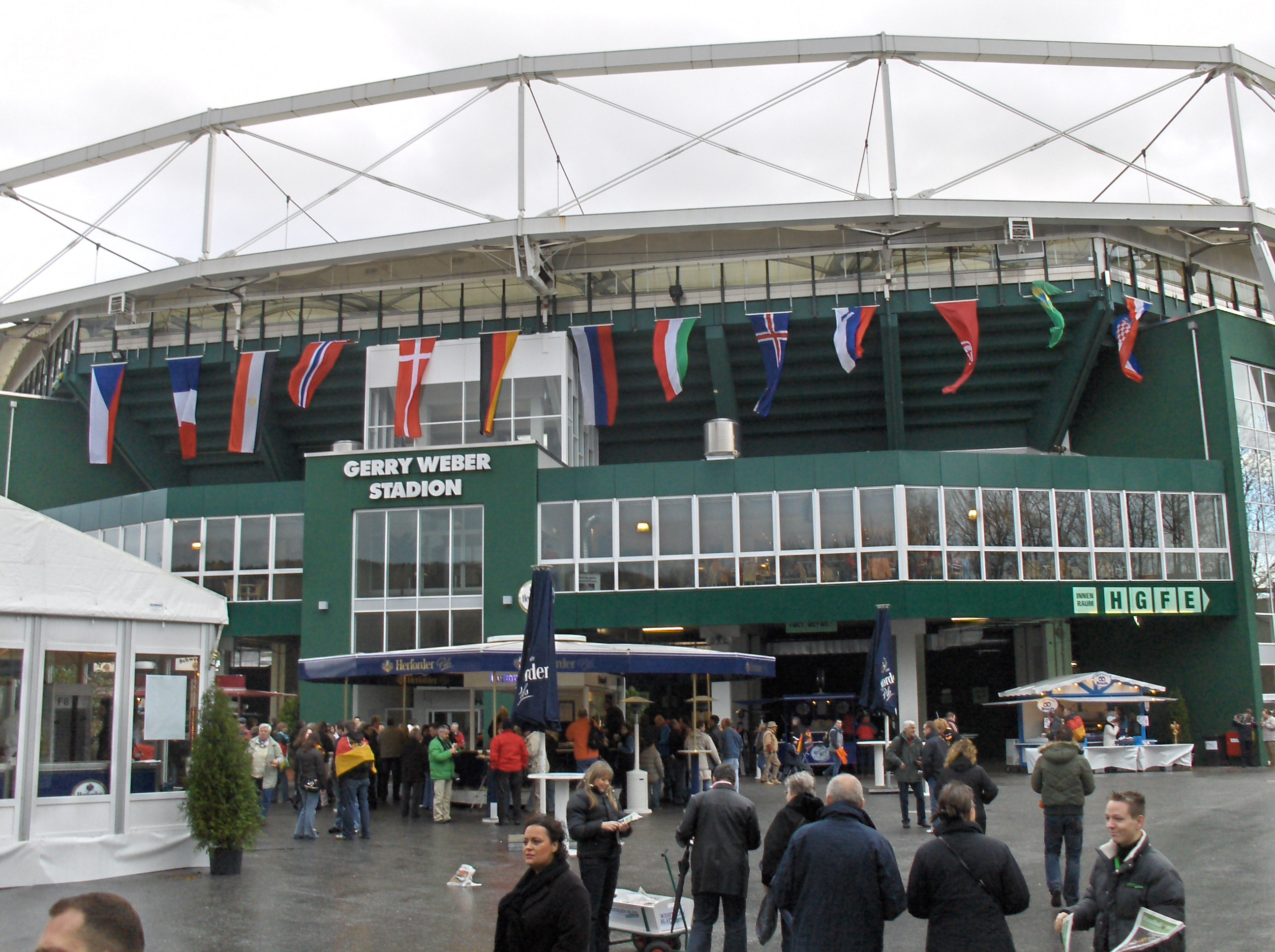
- The Gerry Weber Stadion during the Handball World Cup 2007
- Interactive map of Heristo Arena
- Former names: Gerry Weber Stadion (1993–2020)
- Location: Halle, North Rhine-Westphalia, Germany
- Coordinates: 52°03′47″N 8°20′56″E
- Operator: OWL Sport & Event Verwaltung GmbH
- Capacity: 12,300 (tennis); 11,000 (handball)
- Surface: Grass court

Construction
- Opened: 1993
- Renovated: 1994 (Sattler Europe), 2005
- Cost: € 35 million (1993) € 3.5 million (renovated 2005)
- Architect: Sattler Europe

Tenant
- Halle Open (tennis) (1993–present)

Heristo Arena, formerly OWL Arena and Gerry Weber Stadion, is a multi-purpose stadium, located in Halle, North Rhine-Westphalia, in Germany. The capacity of the arena is 12,300 people and it opened in 1993.

In early 2020, a consortium of 13 sponsors became owner of the venue and its name was changed to OWL Arena.

Since 2026, the German food and pet nutrition company Heristo is the new name sponsor.

== Facilities ==
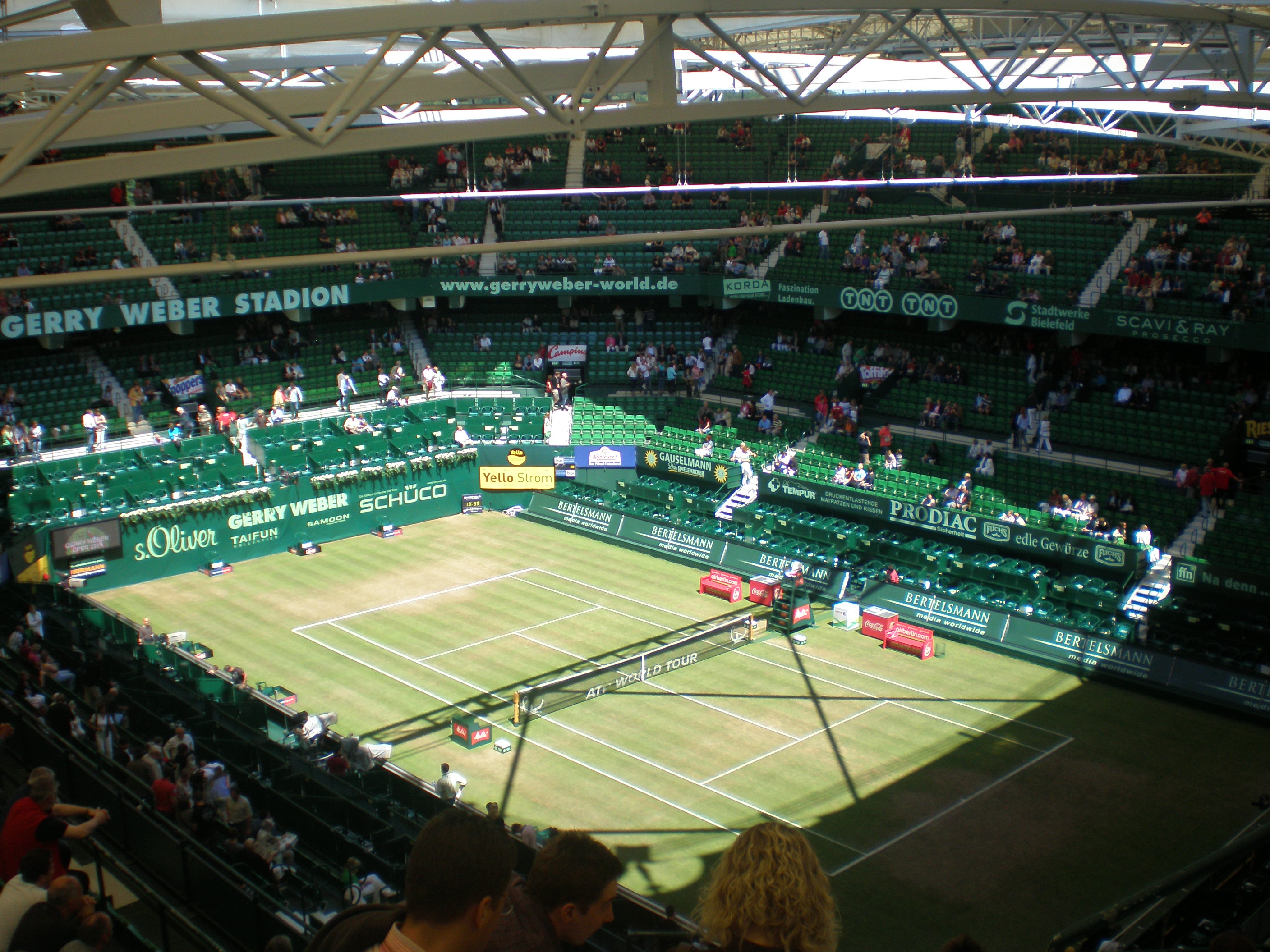
Gerry Weber Stadium in 2009

The stadium has a retractable roof which can be closed in 88 seconds, which rules out the risk of tennis matches having to be suspended because of rain. It is one of the few grass court tennis venues around. The stadium is heated and also used for other sport events (handball, basketball, prisonball, volleyball and boxing), TV shows and concerts.

Halle OWL-Arena station is located 500m from the stadium on the Osnabrück to Bielefeld railway line.

== Events ==
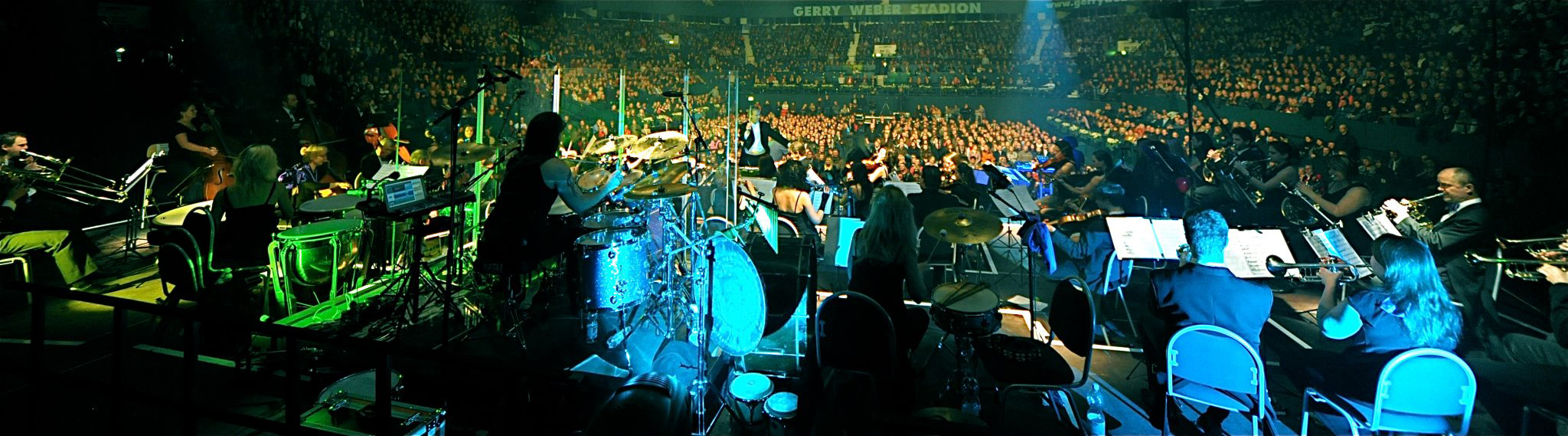
During a concert in 2012

The tennis arena hosts the Halle Open every year in June. On 2 April 2005, Irish vocal pop band Westlife held a concert for their The No 1's Tour supporting their album ...Allow Us to Be Frank.

In January 2007, several games of the Handball World Championship took place there; most of them were sold out with 11,000 spectators.

== Gallery ==
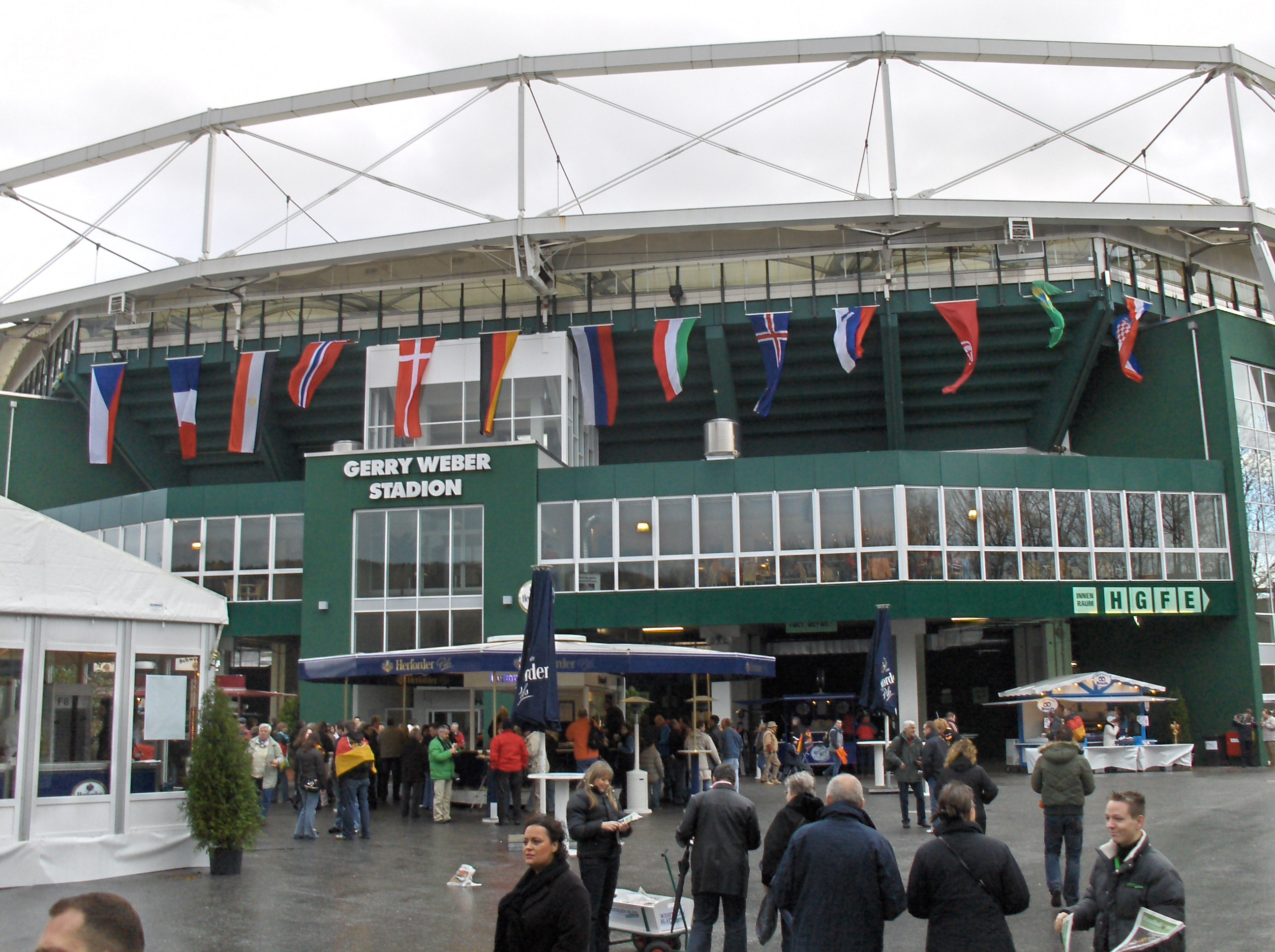

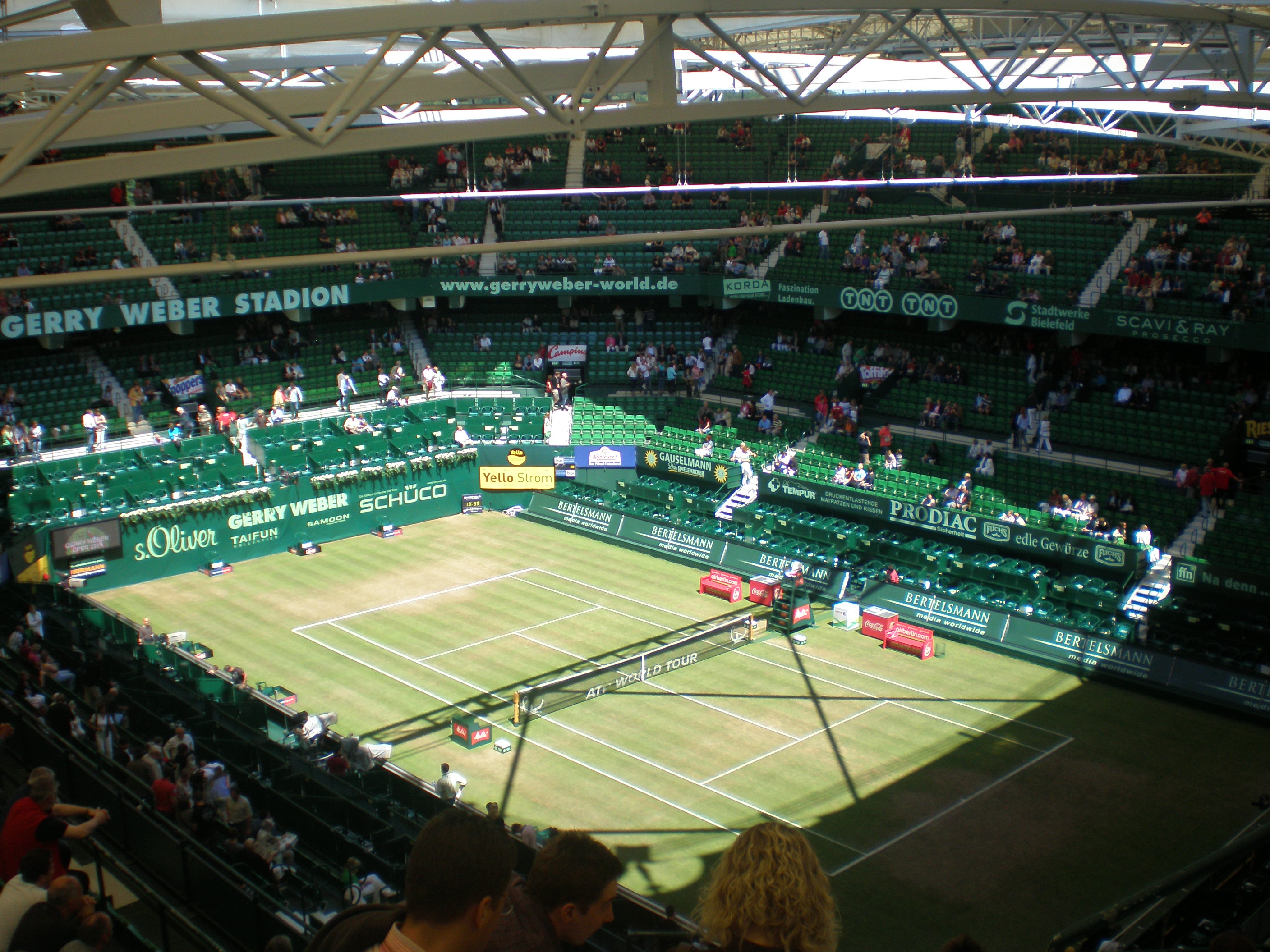

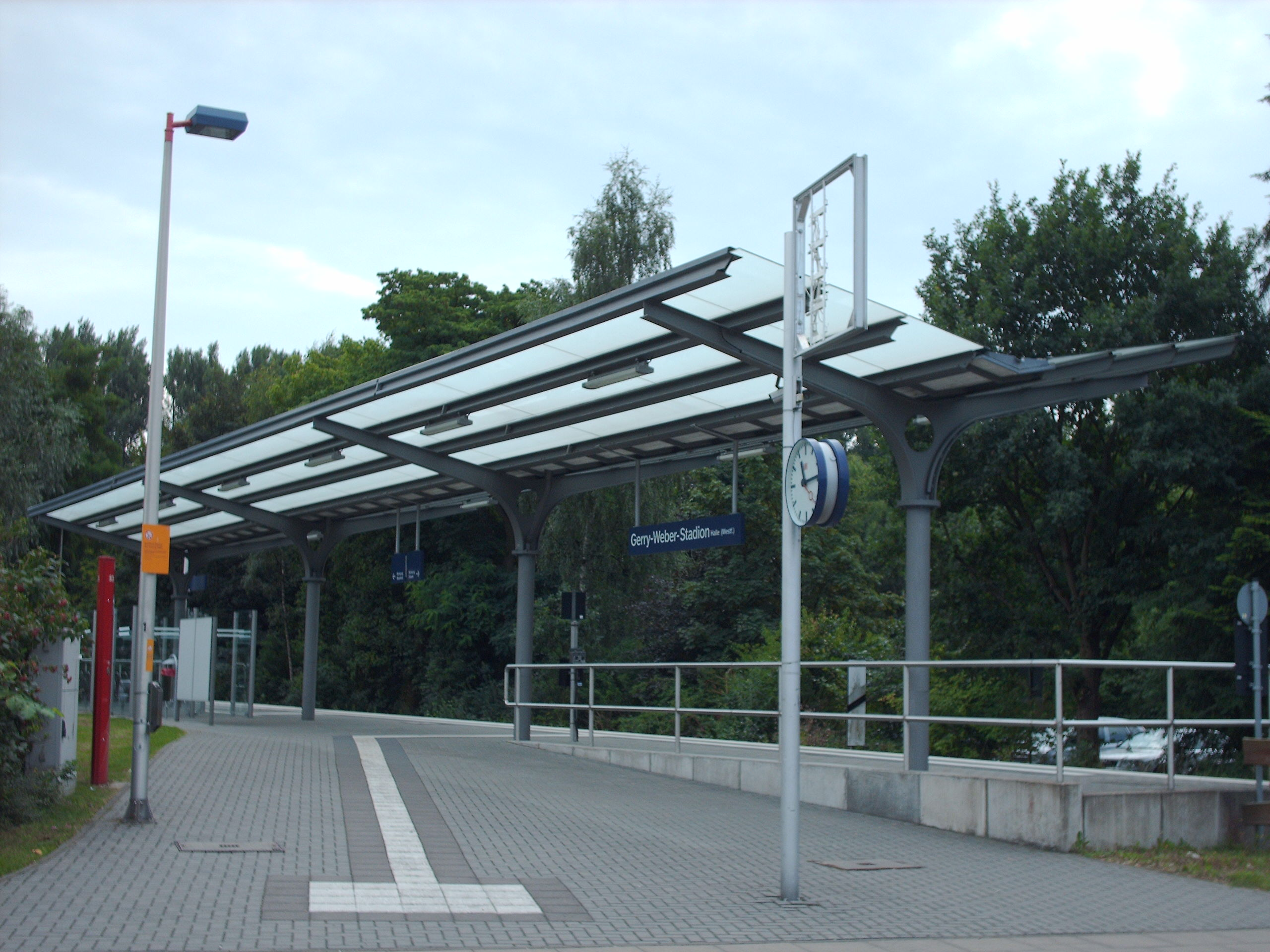

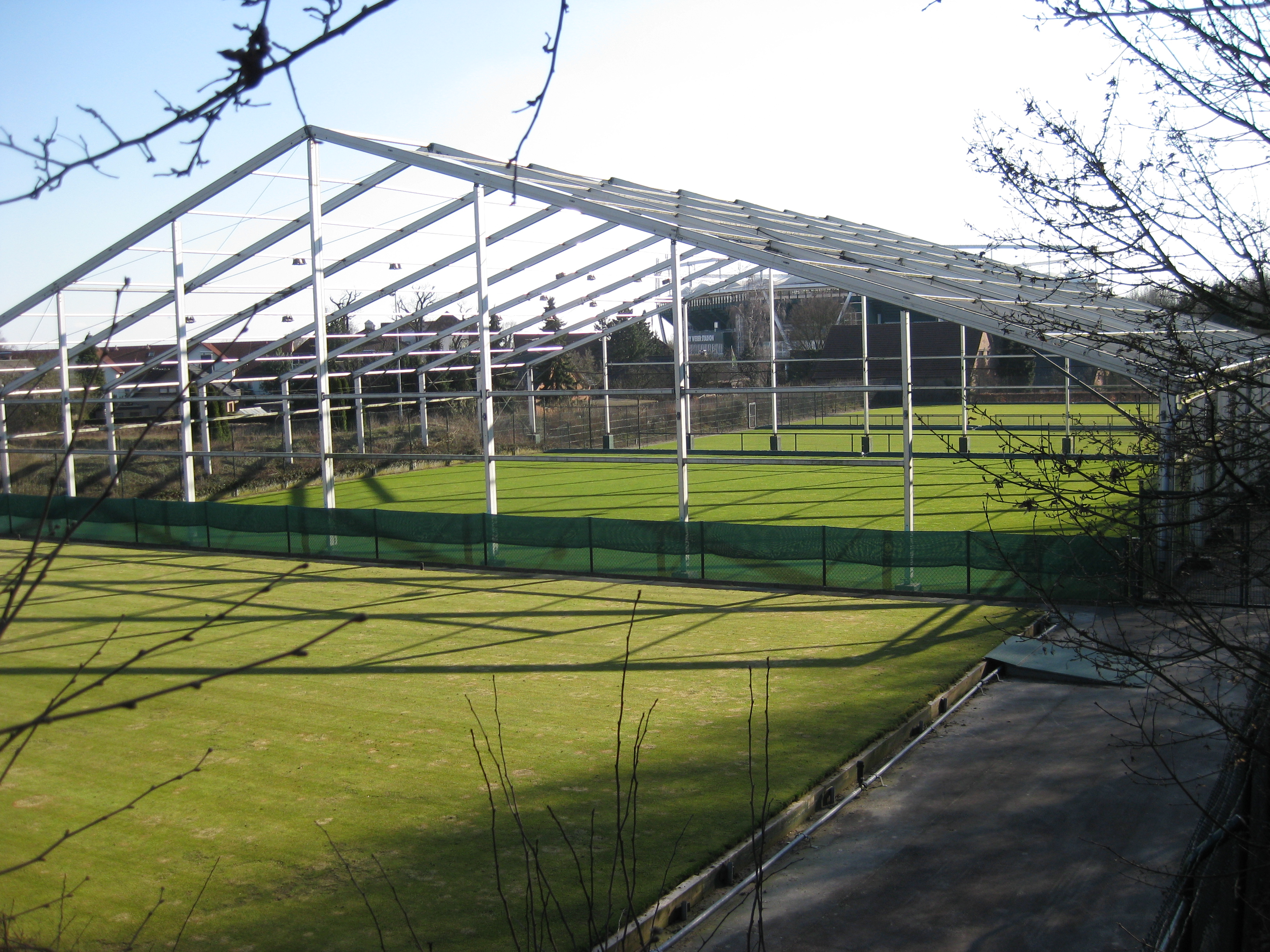

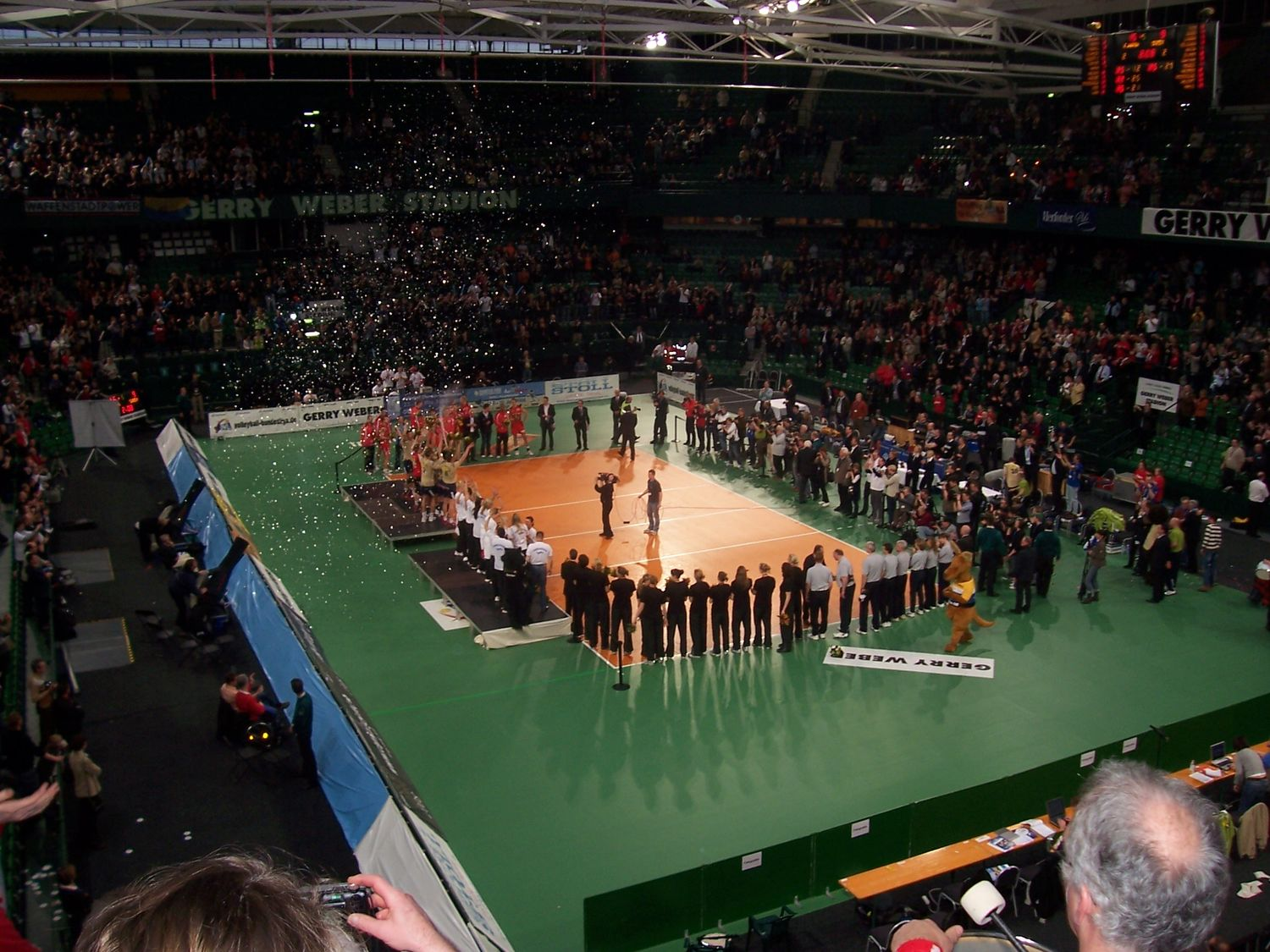

== See also ==
- List of tennis stadiums by capacity
- List of indoor arenas in Germany
