= ÖVB Arena =

Multi-purpose arena in Bremen, Germany

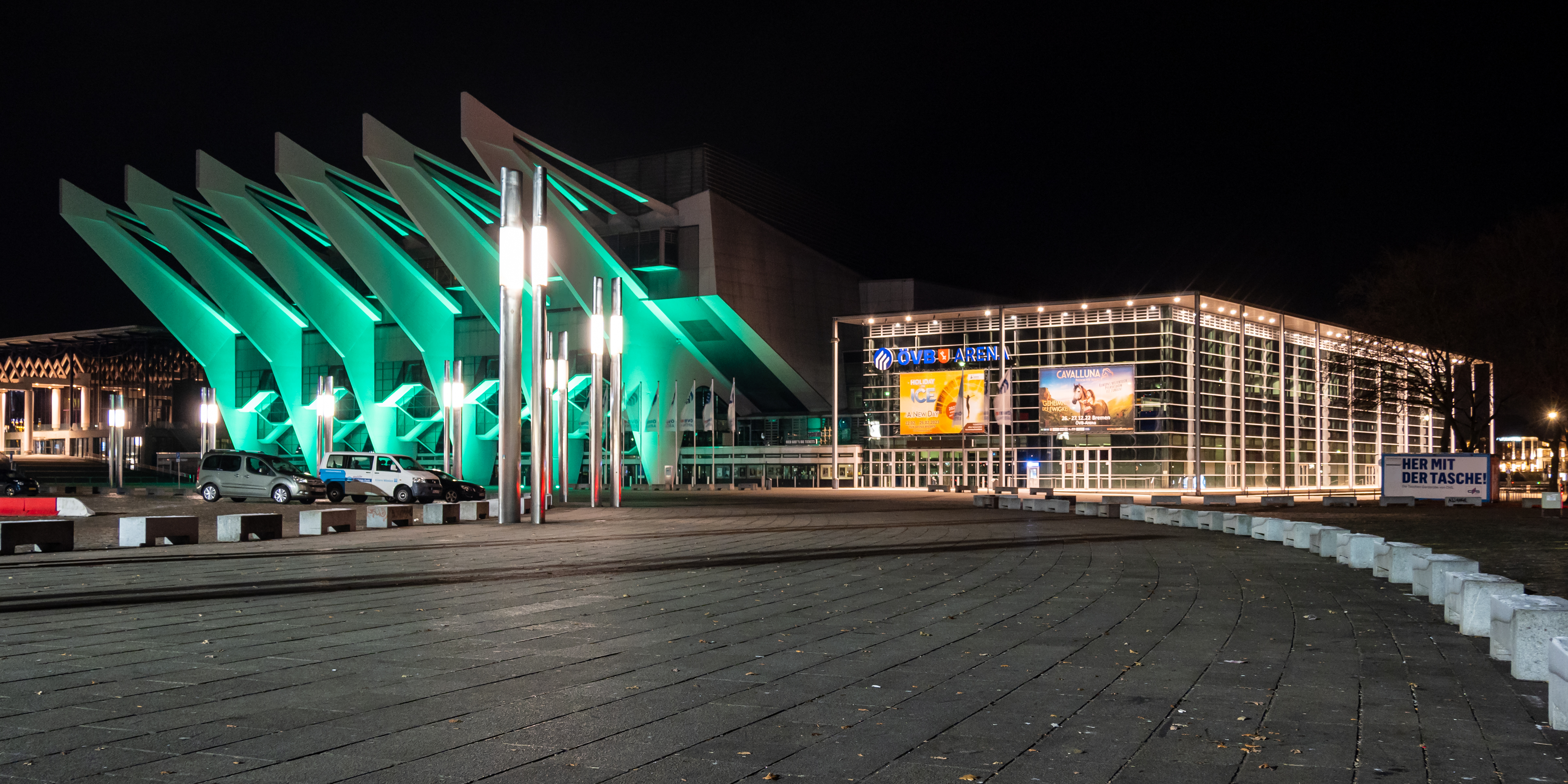
- Interactive map of ÖVB Arena
- Former names: Stadthalle Bremen (1964–2004); AWD-Dome (2005–09); Bremen-Arena (2009–11)
- Location: Bürgerweide; 28215 Bremen; Germany
- Coordinates: 53°05′15″N 8°48′55″E
- Capacity: 14,500; 3,500 (1964–2005)

Construction
- Groundbreaking: 1961
- Opened: 1964
- Renovated: 2004–05
- Cost: DM 28 million (1964) € 50 million (2004) (2004 renovations)
- Architects: 1961 (Roland Rainer); 2004 (Thomas Klumpp)

ÖVB Arena (originally Stadthalle Bremen, formerly Bremen-Arena and AWD-Dome) is the largest indoor arena in Bremen, Germany. It is used for concerts, sports and trade fairs.

== History ==
The arena was designed and built by the Austrian architect Roland Rainer in the years 1961 to 1964.

It used to be called Stadthalle Bremen until the financial services provider Allgemeiner Wirtschaftsdienst (AWD) bought the naming rights in January 2005. Contrary to what the new name suggests, the AWD-Dome is in fact not a dome. The name "Dome" was probably chosen because an AWD-Arena already exists in Hannover. At the same time €50 million were invested into the venue to modernize and expand it from 3,500 to 14,500 seats. The architect Thomas Klumpp led these renovations. When AWD withdrew its sponsorship at the end of 2009, the venue was renamed to Bremen-Arena, effective 1 January 2010. On 11 September 2011, the arena became known as the ÖVB Arena.

== Events ==
The Six Days of Bremen are a yearly event in January, held here since 1965.

On November 31 1980, Queen performed a concert during The Game Tour.

On 12 March 1999, American rock band KISS played the venue on their Psycho Circus Tour. The local fire marshal banned the use of any pyrotechnics. But at the end of the show, Kiss blew up a concert worth of pyro all at once. After that incident, Kiss were banned from playing Bremen in the future.

The AWD-Dome had been used in the 2007 World Men's Handball Championship.

Destiny's Child performed at the venue on May 30, 2002 during their Destiny's Child World Tour.

Depeche Mode performed at the venue several times, including when it was still called Stadthalle Bremen. Other performances include on November 1, 2009, during their Tour of the Universe and December 3, 2013, during their Delta Machine Tour, in front of a sold-out crowd of 11,949 people.

== See also ==
- List of indoor arenas in Germany
