= 2007 World Men's Handball Championship =

Handball-Weltmeisterschaft der Männer 2007 (in German)

Tournament details
- Host country: Germany
- Venues: 12 (in 12 host cities)
- Dates: 19 January–4 February
- Teams: 24 (from 5 confederations)

Final positions
- Champions: Germany (3rd title)
- Runners-up: Poland
- Third place: Denmark
- Fourth place: France

Tournament statistics
- Matches played: 92
- Goals scored: 5,325 (57.88 per match)
- Top scorer: Guðjón Valur Sigurðsson (ISL) (66 goals)

Awards
- Best player: Ivano Balić (CRO)

The 2007 World Men's Handball Championship was the 20th edition of the tournament that took place from 19 January to 4 February 2007 in Germany. 24 national teams played in 12 German cities. It was the 20th edition of the World Championship in team handball and was won by the hosts.

== Stadiums ==
12 German cities were hosts for the 2007 Championship. The most modern stadiums – spread all over the country – had been selected. The final match took place in the Kölnarena in Cologne (Köln).

| Town | Stadium | max. spectators |
|---|---|---|
| Köln | Kölnarena | 19.000 |
| Mannheim | SAP-Arena | 14.300 |
| Hamburg | Color Line Arena | 12.500 |
| Dortmund | Westfalenhalle | 12.000 |
| Halle | Gerry-Weber-Stadion | 11.000 |
| Kiel | Ostseehalle | 10.200 |
| Berlin | Max-Schmeling-Halle | 10.000 |
| Bremen | AWD-Dome | 9.200 |
| Magdeburg | Bördelandhalle | 7.850 |
| Stuttgart | Porsche Arena | 6.100 |
| Lemgo | Lipperlandhalle | 5.000 |
| Wetzlar | Mittelhessen-Arena | 5.000 |

== Venues ==
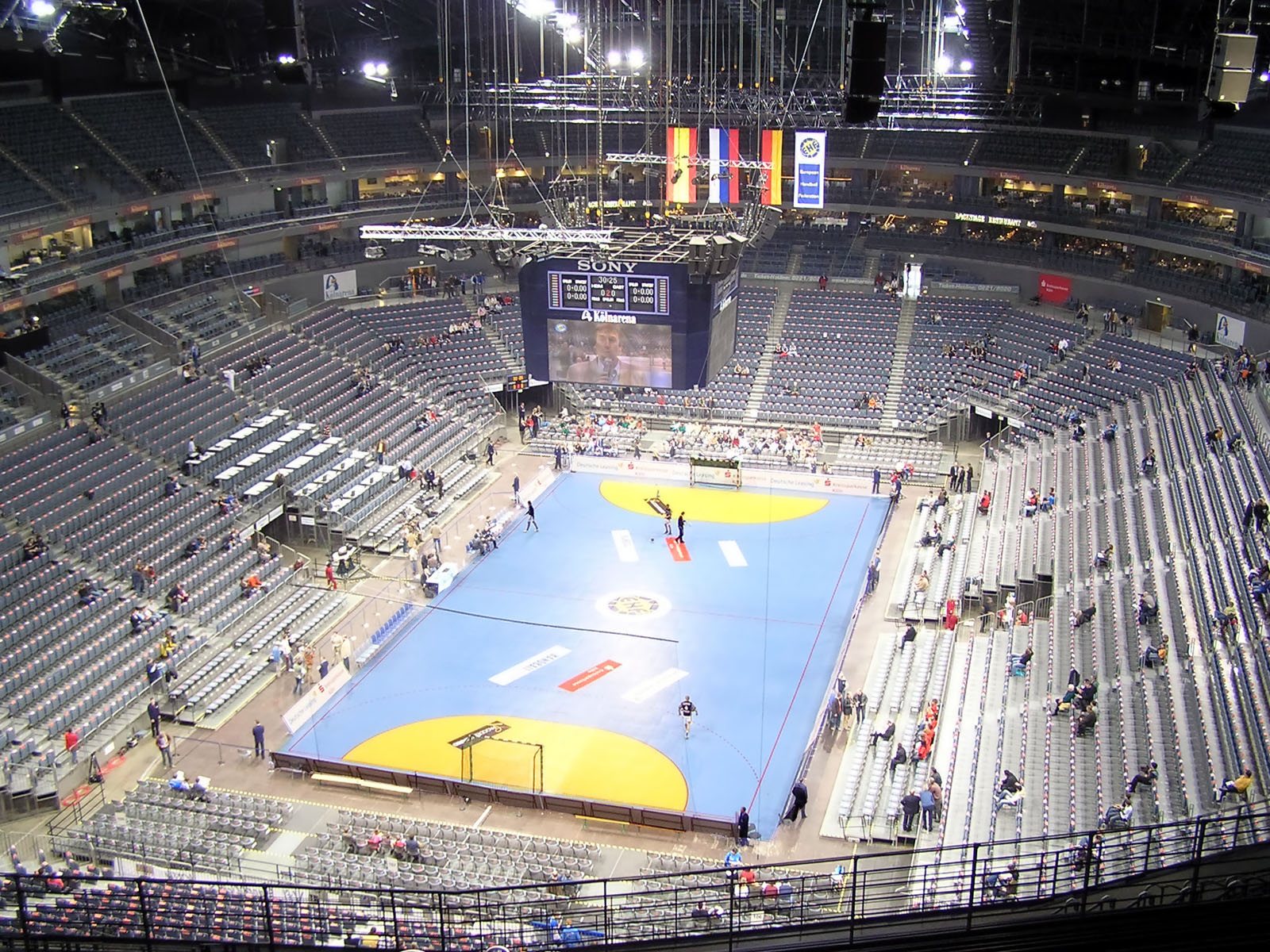
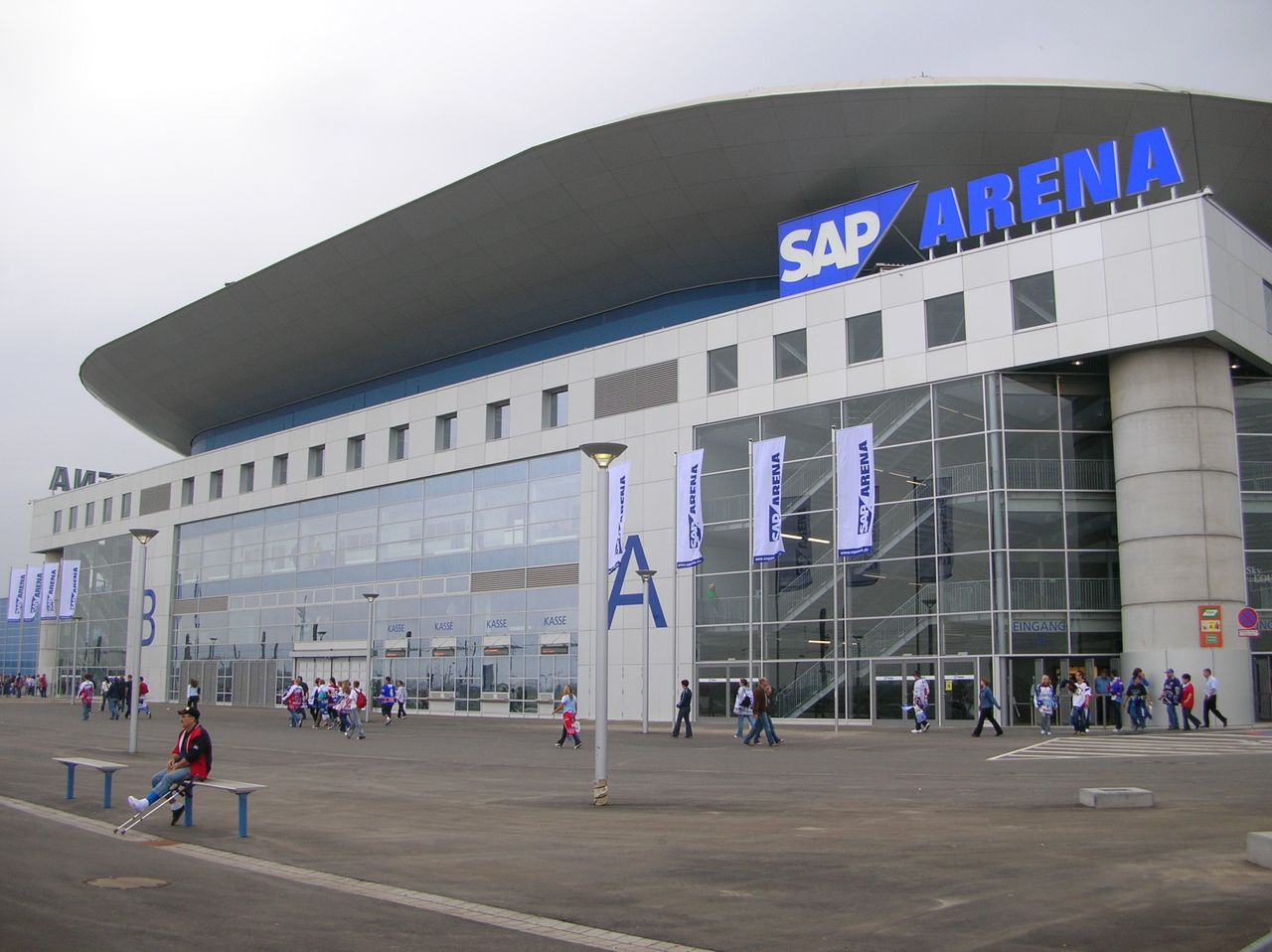
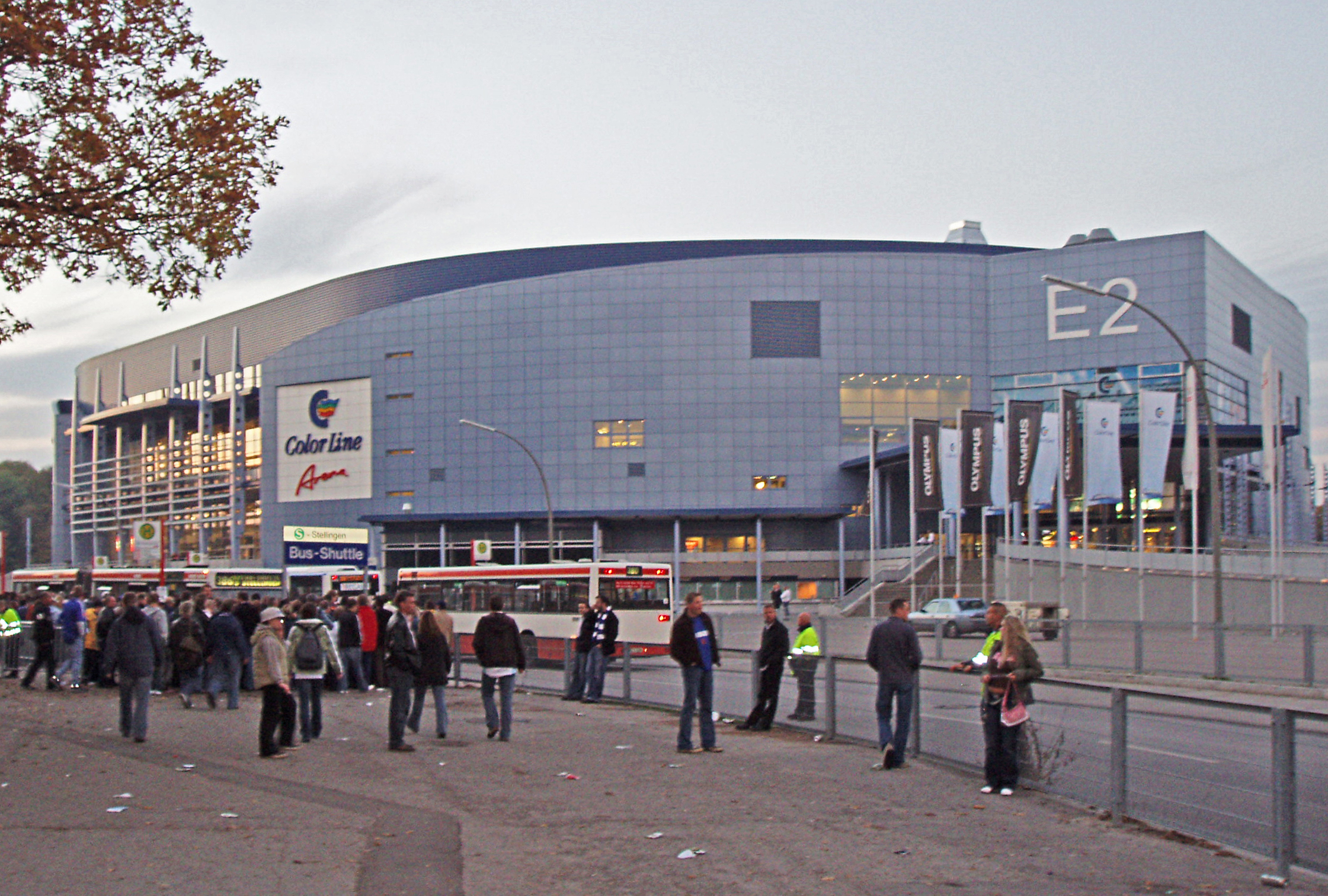
Kölnarena

(Kölnarena)
Location: Cologne
Capacity: 19,500
Club: VfL Gummersbach

SAP Arena

(SAP-Arena)
Location: Mannheim
Capacity: 14,300
Club: Rhein-Neckar Löwen

Color Line Arena

(Color Line Arena)
Location: Hamburg
Capacity: 13,800
Clubs: HSV Handball

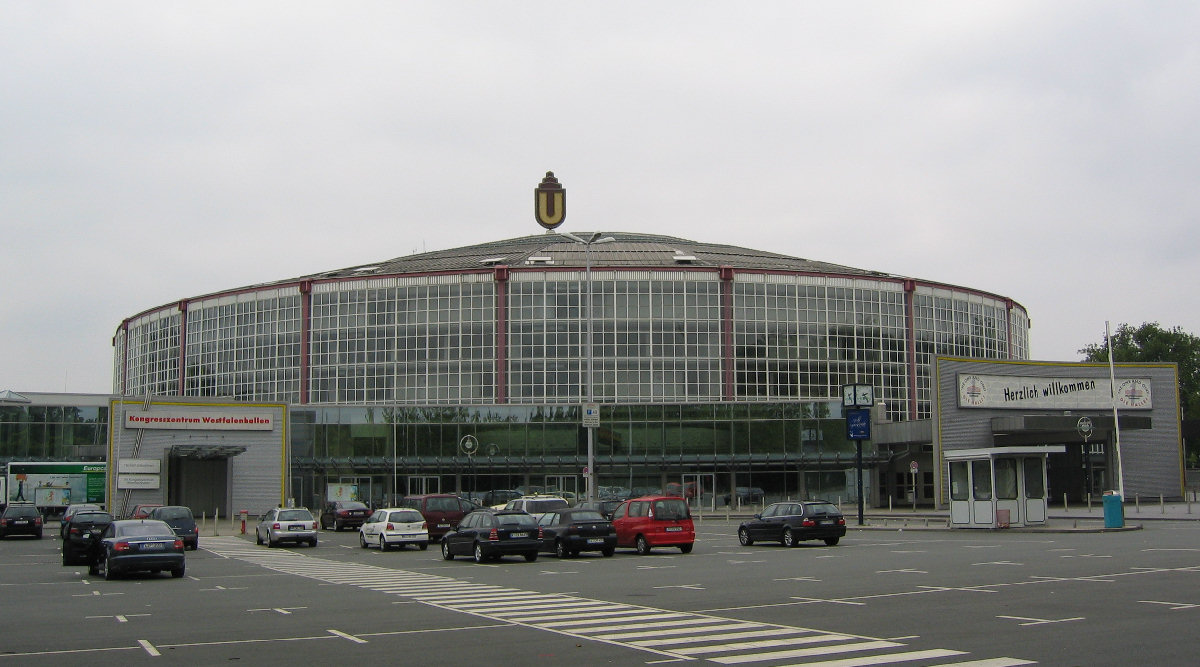
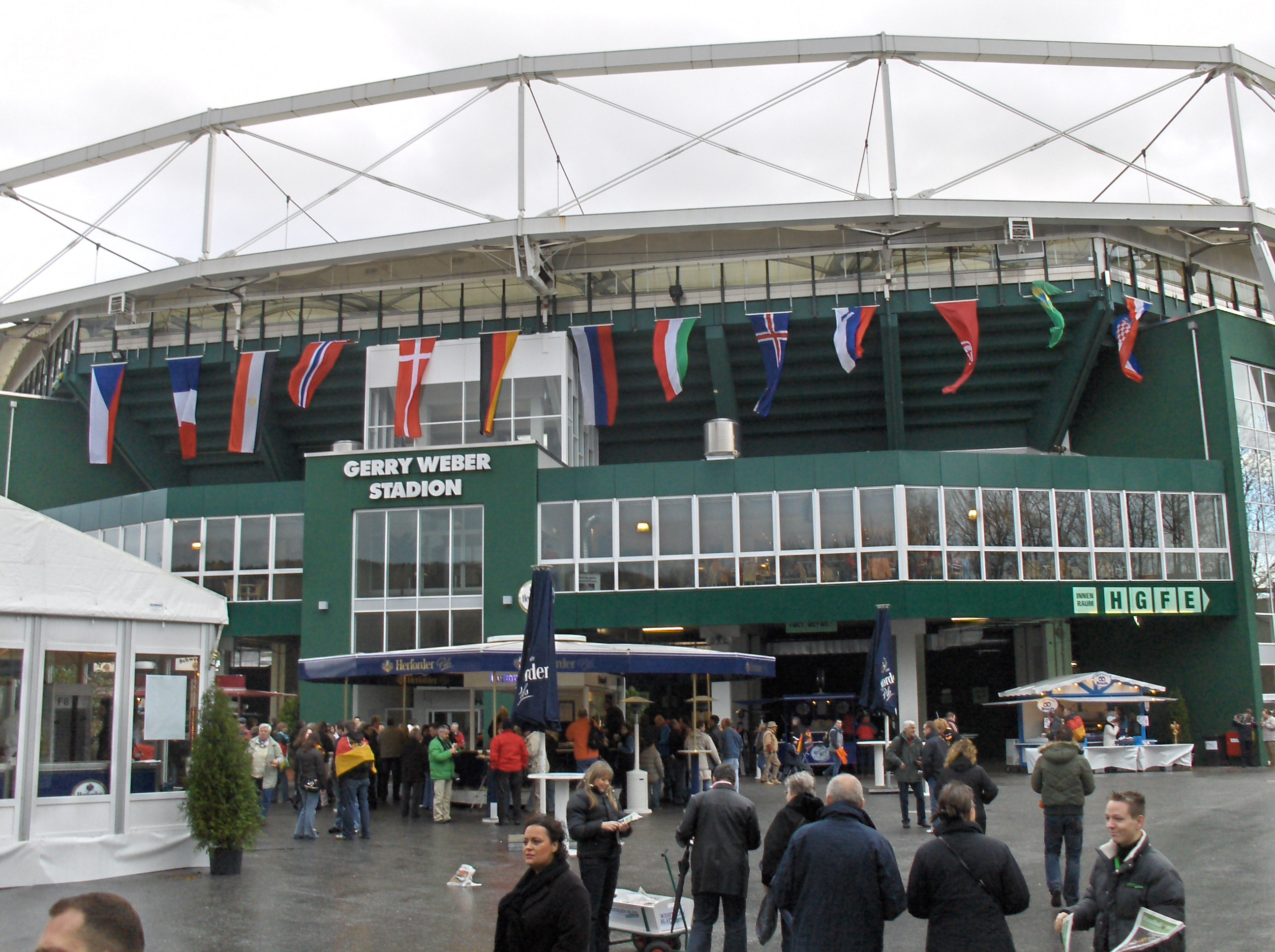
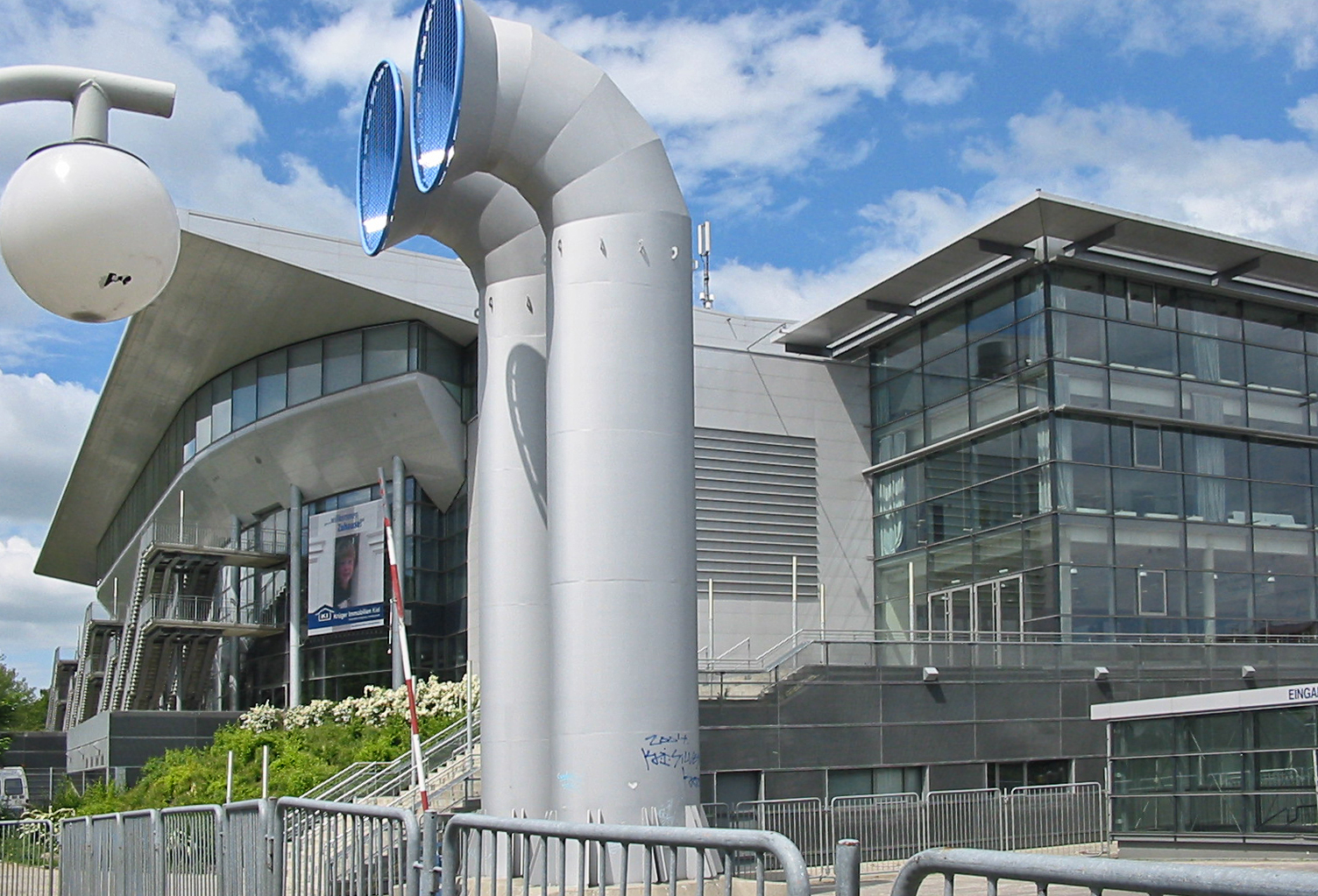
Westfalenhalle

(Westfalenhalle)
Location: Dortmund
Capacity: 12,000
Club:

Gerry Weber Stadion

(Gerry Weber Stadion)
Location: Halle
Capacity: 11,000
Club:

Ostseehalle

(Ostseehalle)
Location: Kiel
Capacity: 10,200
Club: THW Kiel

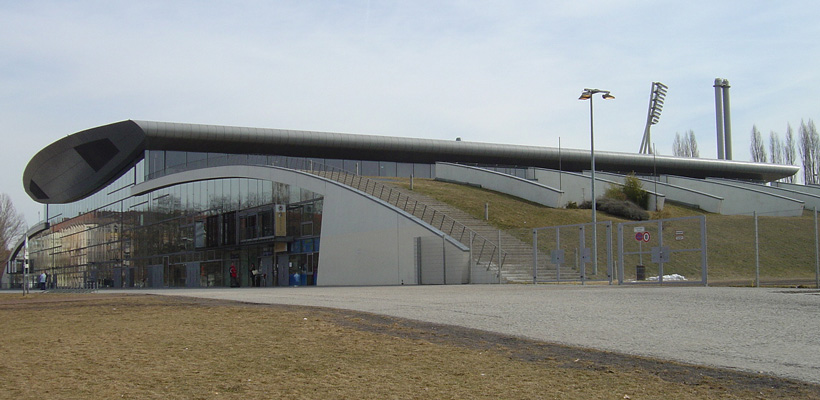
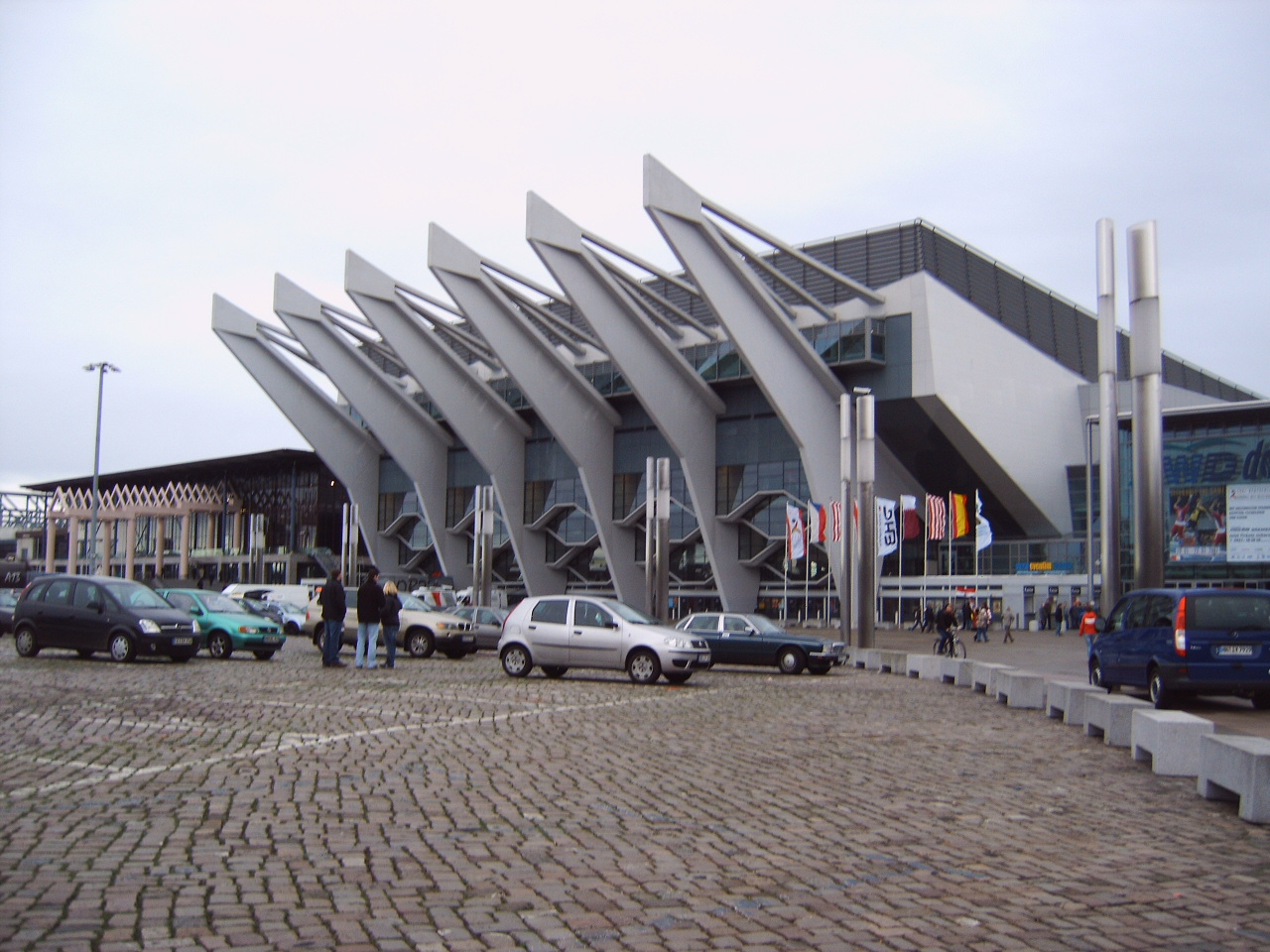
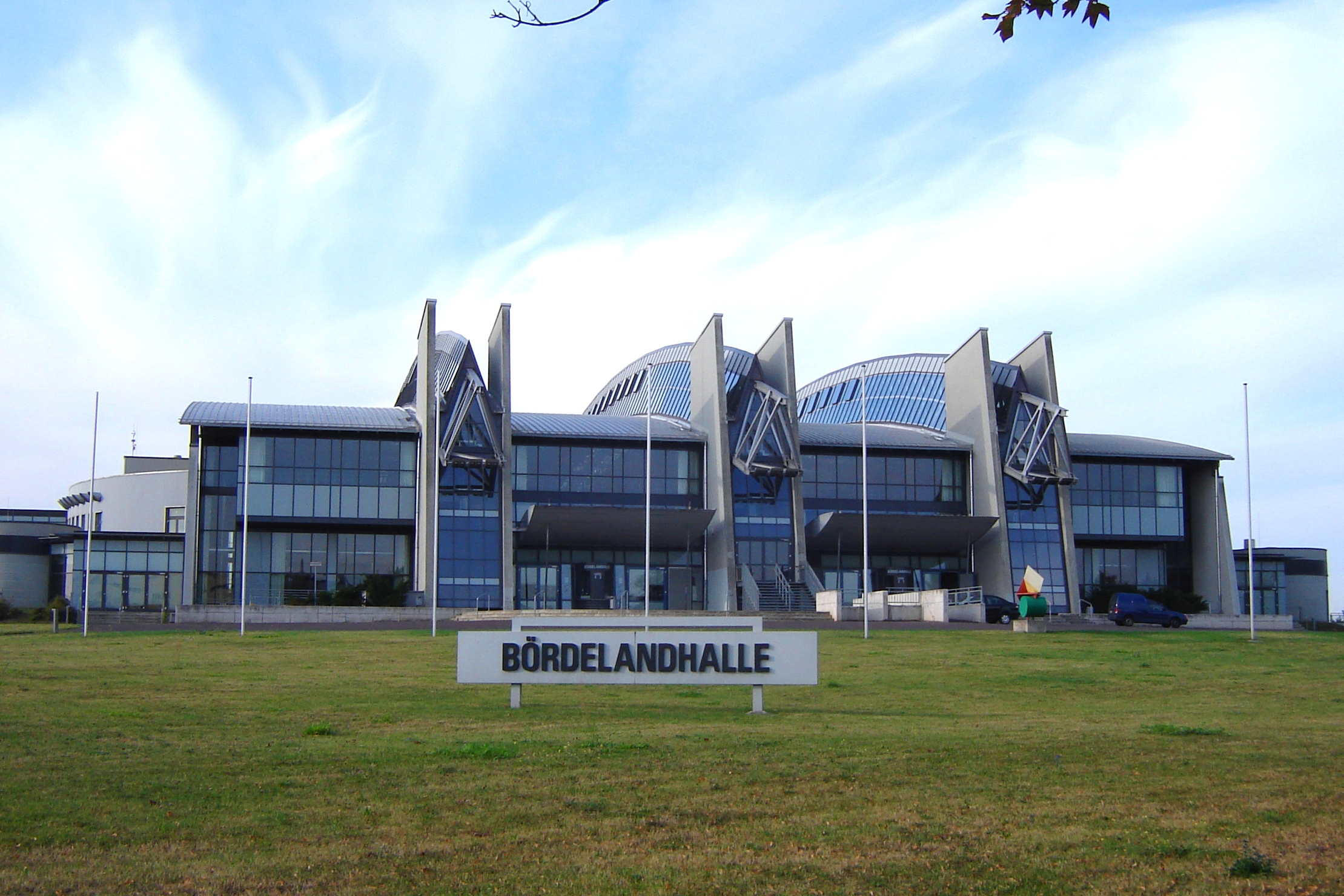
Max-Schmeling-Halle

(Max-Schmeling-Halle)
Location: Berlin
Capacity: 10,000
Club: Füchse Berlin

AWD-Dome

(AWD-Dome)
Location: Bremen
Capacity: 9,200
Club:

Bördelandhalle

(Bördelandhalle)
Location: Magdeburg
Capacity: 7,850
Club: SC Magdeburg

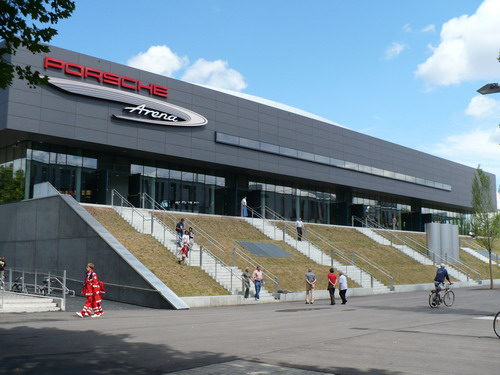
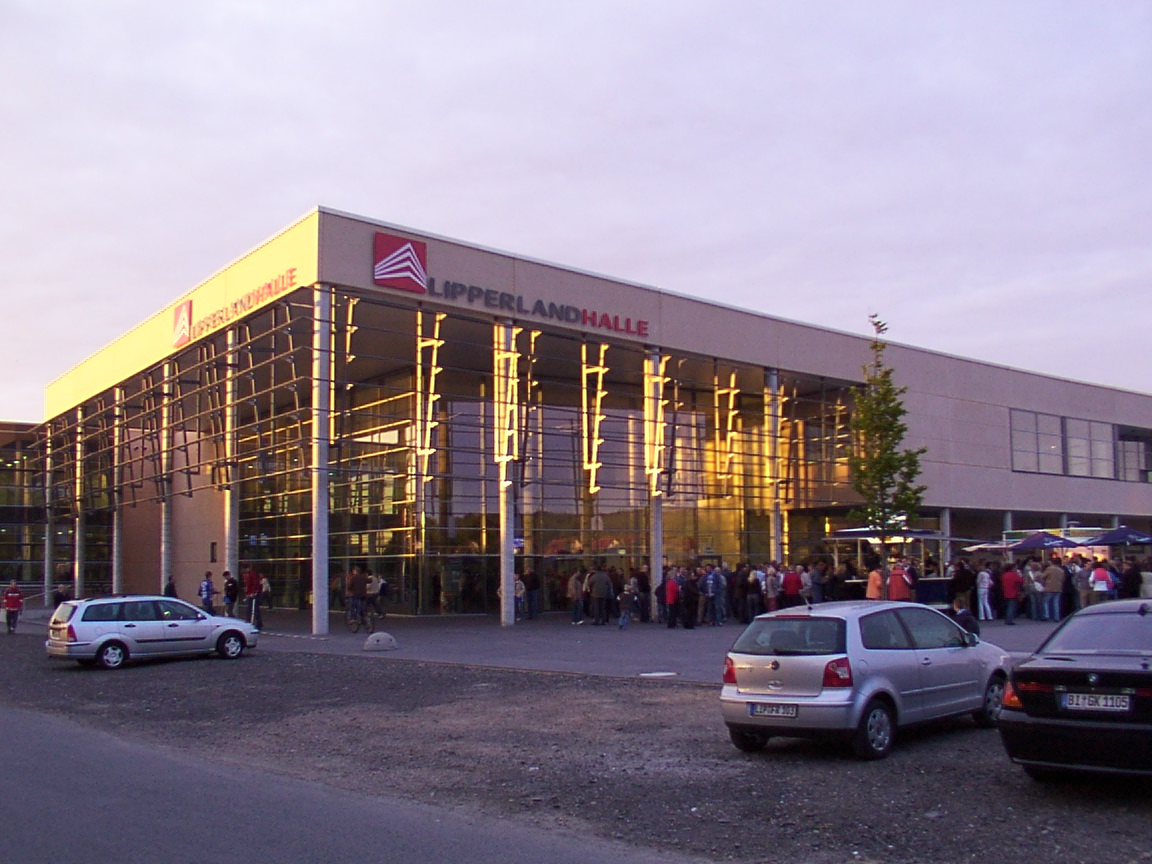
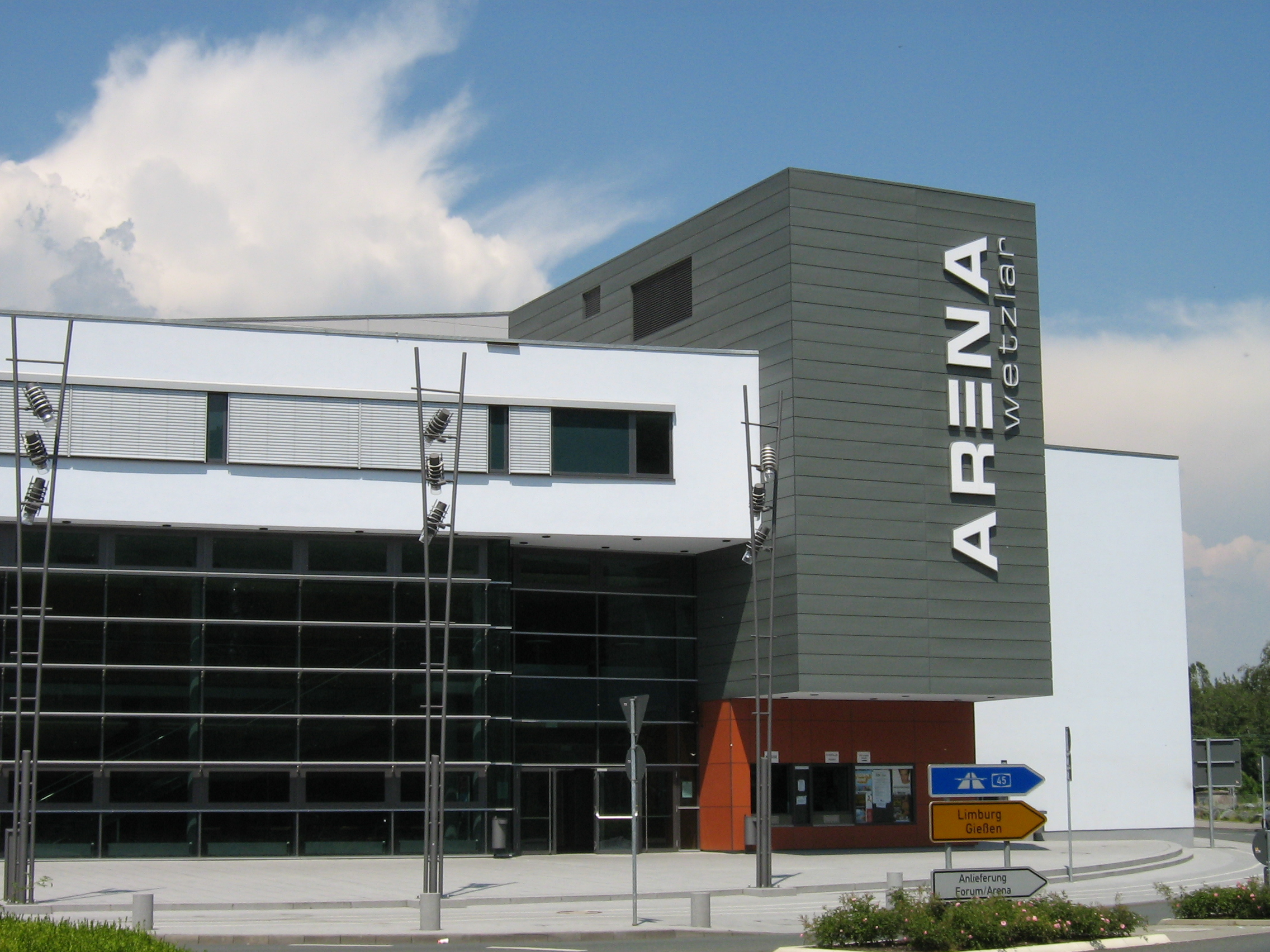
Porsche Arena

(Porsche Arena)
Location: Stuttgart
Capacity: 6,100
Club:

Lipperlandhalle

(Lipperlandhalle)
Location: Lemgo
Capacity: 5,000
Club: TBV Lemgo

Rittal Arena Wetzlar

(Rittal Arena Wetzlar)
Location: Wetzlar
Capacity: 5,000
Club: HSG Wetzlar

== Qualification ==
| Competition | Dates | Host | Vacancies | Qualified |
|---|---|---|---|---|
| Host nation | | | 1 | Germany |
| 2005 World Championship | 23 January – 6 February 2005 | Tunisia | 1 | Spain |
| 2006 African Championship | 10–20 January 2006 | Tunisia | 4 | Tunisia; Egypt; Morocco; Angola |
| 2006 European Championship | 26 January – 5 February 2006 | Switzerland | 3 | France; Denmark; Croatia |
| 2006 Asian Championship | 12–21 February 2006 | (Thailand) Bangkok | 3 | Kuwait; South Korea; Qatar |
| 2006 Oceania Championship | 22–24 May 2006 | (Australia) Sydney | 1 | Australia |
| 2006 Pan American Championship | 6–10 June 2006 | (Brazil) Aracaju | 3 | Brazil; Argentina; Greenland |
| European qualification | 4 January – 18 June 2006 | Various | 8 | Czech Republic; Hungary; Iceland; Norway; Poland; Russia; Slovenia; Ukraine |

== Tournament structure ==
=== Preliminary round ===
The 24 competing teams will be drawn into six preliminary groups of four teams each, and the matches in the preliminary round are scheduled to be held from 20 to 22 January. The two top teams from each group then proceed to the main round, while the third and fourth-placed teams play in the Presidents-Cup.

On 14 July 2006, the groups of the tournament were determined:

Group A (Wetzlar):

- Tunisia
- Slovenia
- Kuwait
- Greenland

Group D (Bremen):

- Spain
- Czech Republic
- Egypt
- Qatar

Group B (Magdeburg):

- France
- Iceland
- Ukraine
- Australia

Group E (Kiel):

- Denmark
- Norway
- Hungary
- Angola

Group C (Berlin, Halle):

- Germany
- Poland
- Brazil
- Argentina

Group F (Stuttgart):

- Croatia
- Russia
- Morocco
- South Korea

=== Presidents-Cup ===
The teams placed third and fourth in the preliminary round groups are divided into four groups of three teams, as such:

Group I:

- 3rd-placed group A
- 3rd-placed group B
- 3rd-placed group C

Group II:

- 3rd-placed group D
- 3rd-placed group E
- 3rd-placed group F

Group III:

- 4th-placed group A
- 4th-placed group B
- 4th-placed group C

Group IV:

- 4th-placed group D
- 4th-placed group E
- 4th-placed group F

The matches are scheduled for 24 to 26 January. On 28 January, the winners of group I and II then play each other for the 13th place, the runners-up play each other for the 15th place, and the third-placed play off for 17th place. The Group III and IV teams play off for 19th, 21st and 23rd place in the same fashion.

=== Main round ===
The main round is scheduled for 24 to 28 January, and the teams will be divided into two groups of six teams. The teams carry forward match results from matches against the other team from their group to qualify for the main round. Four teams from each main round group qualify for the quarter-finals.

No placement matches for the places 9 to 12 are scheduled.

=== Knockout stage ===
The knockout stage is scheduled to make up the last week of the tournament, starting on Tuesday 30 January and continuing until Sunday 4 February. The quarter-finals are set up so that the winner of one group will face the fourth-placed team in the other. Semi-finals and consolation matches are held on 1 February; two days later, the 5th and 7th place play-offs take place on 3 February, with the 3rd place play-off and final is scheduled for the following day.

=== Seedings ===
The seedings for the preliminary round have been partially determined; the full seedings will be revealed when all qualifying matches have been played. Currently, the following seedings (in IHF terminology, performance row) have been confirmed:

- Pot 1: Spain, France, Denmark, Tunisia, Croatia, Germany
- Pot 2: Europe 4, Europe 5, Europe 6, Europe 7, Europe 8, Europe 9
- Pot 3: Egypt, Kuwait, Morocco, Europe 10, Europe 11, Brazil
- Pot 4: Angola, South Korea, Qatar, Argentina, Greenland, Australia

== Preliminary round ==
All times are local (UTC+1).

=== Group A ===
| Pos | Team | Pld | W | D | L | GF | GA | GD | Pts | Qualification |
|---|---|---|---|---|---|---|---|---|---|---|
| 1 | Slovenia | 3 | 3 | 0 | 0 | 102 | 71 | +31 | 6 | Main round |
| 2 | Tunisia | 3 | 2 | 0 | 1 | 97 | 77 | +20 | 4 | Main round |
| 3 | Kuwait | 3 | 1 | 0 | 2 | 85 | 94 | −9 | 2 | |
| 4 | Greenland | 3 | 0 | 0 | 3 | 68 | 110 | −42 | 0 | |

Rules for classification: 1) points; 2) head-to-head points; 3) head-to-head goal difference; 4) head-to-head number of goals scored; 5) goal difference.

| 20 January 2007; 18:00 | Slovenia | 35–21 | Greenland | Rittal Arena Wetzlar, Wetzlar; Attendance: 4,200 |
| 20 January 2007; 18:00 | | (17–9) | | Rittal Arena Wetzlar, Wetzlar; Attendance: 4,200 |
| 20 January 2007; 18:00 | | Report | | Rittal Arena Wetzlar, Wetzlar; Attendance: 4,200 |

| 20 January 2007; 20:00 | Tunisia | 34–23 | Kuwait | Rittal Arena Wetzlar, Wetzlar; Attendance: 4,000 |
| 20 January 2007; 20:00 | | (14–11) | | Rittal Arena Wetzlar, Wetzlar; Attendance: 4,000 |
| 20 January 2007; 20:00 | | Report | | Rittal Arena Wetzlar, Wetzlar; Attendance: 4,000 |

| 21 January 2007; 16:00 | Greenland | 20–36 | Tunisia | Rittal Arena Wetzlar, Wetzlar; Attendance: 4,000 |
| 21 January 2007; 16:00 | | (4–17) | | Rittal Arena Wetzlar, Wetzlar; Attendance: 4,000 |

| 21 January 2007; 18:00 | Kuwait | 23–33 | Slovenia | Rittal Arena Wetzlar, Wetzlar; Attendance: 4,000 |
| 21 January 2007; 18:00 | | (11–17) | | Rittal Arena Wetzlar, Wetzlar; Attendance: 4,000 |
| 21 January 2007; 18:00 | | Report | | Rittal Arena Wetzlar, Wetzlar; Attendance: 4,000 |

| 22 January 2007; 18:00 | Kuwait | 39–27 | Greenland | Rittal Arena Wetzlar, Wetzlar; Attendance: 4,000 |
| 22 January 2007; 18:00 | | (19–13) | | Rittal Arena Wetzlar, Wetzlar; Attendance: 4,000 |
| 22 January 2007; 18:00 | | Report | | Rittal Arena Wetzlar, Wetzlar; Attendance: 4,000 |

| 22 January 2007; 20:00 | Tunisia | 27–34 | Slovenia | Rittal Arena Wetzlar, Wetzlar; Attendance: 4,000 |
| 22 January 2007; 20:00 | | (14–16) | | Rittal Arena Wetzlar, Wetzlar; Attendance: 4,000 |
| 22 January 2007; 20:00 | | Report | | Rittal Arena Wetzlar, Wetzlar; Attendance: 4,000 |

=== Group B ===
| Pos | Team | Pld | W | D | L | GF | GA | GD | Pts | Qualification |
|---|---|---|---|---|---|---|---|---|---|---|
| 1 | Iceland | 3 | 2 | 0 | 1 | 106 | 76 | +30 | 4 (Note: Iceland 2 Pts, +5 GD; France 2 Pts, +3 GD; Ukraine 2 Pts, –8 GD) | Main round |
| 2 | France | 3 | 2 | 0 | 1 | 103 | 63 | +40 | 4 | Main round |
| 3 | Ukraine | 3 | 2 | 0 | 1 | 90 | 79 | +11 | 4 | |
| 4 | Australia | 3 | 0 | 0 | 3 | 48 | 129 | −81 | 0 | |

Rules for classification: 1) points; 2) head-to-head points; 3) head-to-head goal difference; 4) head-to-head number of goals scored; 5) goal difference.
Notes:

| 20 January 2007; 16:00 | Iceland | 45–20 | Australia | Bördelandhalle, Magdeburg; Attendance: 7,200 |
| 20 January 2007; 16:00 | | (26–9) | | Bördelandhalle, Magdeburg; Attendance: 7,200 |
| 20 January 2007; 16:00 | | Report | | Bördelandhalle, Magdeburg; Attendance: 7,200 |

| 20 January 2007; 18:00 | France | 32–21 | Ukraine | Bördelandhalle, Magdeburg; Attendance: 7,300 |
| 20 January 2007; 18:00 | | (17–8) | | Bördelandhalle, Magdeburg; Attendance: 7,300 |
| 20 January 2007; 18:00 | | Report | | Bördelandhalle, Magdeburg; Attendance: 7,300 |

| 21 January 2007; 16:00 | Australia | 10–47 | France | Bördelandhalle, Magdeburg; Attendance: 7,200 |
| 21 January 2007; 16:00 | | (5–25) | | Bördelandhalle, Magdeburg; Attendance: 7,200 |
| 21 January 2007; 16:00 | | Report | | Bördelandhalle, Magdeburg; Attendance: 7,200 |

| 21 January 2007; 18:00 | Ukraine | 32–29 | Iceland | Bördelandhalle, Magdeburg; Attendance: 7,400 |
| 21 January 2007; 18:00 | | (12–13) | | Bördelandhalle, Magdeburg; Attendance: 7,400 |
| 21 January 2007; 18:00 | | Report | | Bördelandhalle, Magdeburg; Attendance: 7,400 |

| 22 January 2007; 18:00 | Ukraine | 37–18 | Australia | Bördelandhalle, Magdeburg; Attendance: 7,000 |
| 22 January 2007; 18:00 | | (18–8) | | Bördelandhalle, Magdeburg; Attendance: 7,000 |
| 22 January 2007; 18:00 | | Report | | Bördelandhalle, Magdeburg; Attendance: 7,000 |

| 22 January 2007; 20:00 | France | 24–32 | Iceland | Bördelandhalle, Magdeburg; Attendance: 7,500 |
| 22 January 2007; 20:00 | | (8–18) | | Bördelandhalle, Magdeburg; Attendance: 7,500 |
| 22 January 2007; 20:00 | | Report | | Bördelandhalle, Magdeburg; Attendance: 7,500 |

=== Group C ===
| Pos | Team | Pld | W | D | L | GF | GA | GD | Pts | Qualification |
|---|---|---|---|---|---|---|---|---|---|---|
| 1 | Poland | 3 | 3 | 0 | 0 | 87 | 63 | +24 | 6 | Main round |
| 2 | Germany (H) | 3 | 2 | 0 | 1 | 84 | 69 | +15 | 4 | Main round |
| 3 | Argentina | 3 | 1 | 0 | 2 | 57 | 81 | −24 | 2 | |
| 4 | Brazil | 3 | 0 | 0 | 3 | 65 | 80 | −15 | 0 | |

Rules for classification: 1) points; 2) head-to-head points; 3) head-to-head goal difference; 4) head-to-head number of goals scored; 5) goal difference.
(H) Hosts

| 19 January 2007; 17:30 | Germany | 27–22 | Brazil | Max-Schmeling-Halle, Berlin; Attendance: 10,000 |
| 19 January 2007; 17:30 | | (12–10) | | Max-Schmeling-Halle, Berlin; Attendance: 10,000 |
| 19 January 2007; 17:30 | | Report | | Max-Schmeling-Halle, Berlin; Attendance: 10,000 |

| 20 January 2007; 19:30 | Poland | 29–15 | Argentina | Gerry Weber Stadion, Halle; Attendance: 6,500 |
| 20 January 2007; 19:30 | | (12–9) | | Gerry Weber Stadion, Halle; Attendance: 6,500 |
| 20 January 2007; 19:30 | | Report | | Gerry Weber Stadion, Halle; Attendance: 6,500 |

| 21 January 2007; 15:30 | Brazil | 23–31 | Poland | Gerry Weber Stadion, Halle; Attendance: 11,000 |
| 21 January 2007; 15:30 | | (13–15) | | Gerry Weber Stadion, Halle; Attendance: 11,000 |
| 21 January 2007; 15:30 | | Report | | Gerry Weber Stadion, Halle; Attendance: 11,000 |

| 21 January 2007; 17:30 | Argentina | 20–32 | Germany | Gerry Weber Stadion, Halle; Attendance: 11,000 |
| 21 January 2007; 17:30 | | (11–17) | | Gerry Weber Stadion, Halle; Attendance: 11,000 |
| 21 January 2007; 17:30 | | Report | | Gerry Weber Stadion, Halle; Attendance: 11,000 |

| 22 January 2007; 17:00 | Germany | 25–27 | Poland | Gerry Weber Stadion, Halle; Attendance: 11,000 |
| 22 January 2007; 17:00 | | (12–14) | | Gerry Weber Stadion, Halle; Attendance: 11,000 |
| 22 January 2007; 17:00 | | Report | | Gerry Weber Stadion, Halle; Attendance: 11,000 |

| 22 January 2007; 19:30 | Brazil | 20–22 | Argentina | Gerry Weber Stadion, Halle; Attendance: 11,000 |
| 22 January 2007; 19:30 | | (10–7) | | Gerry Weber Stadion, Halle; Attendance: 11,000 |
| 22 January 2007; 19:30 | | Report | | Gerry Weber Stadion, Halle; Attendance: 11,000 |

=== Group D ===
| Pos | Team | Pld | W | D | L | GF | GA | GD | Pts | Qualification |
|---|---|---|---|---|---|---|---|---|---|---|
| 1 | Spain | 3 | 3 | 0 | 0 | 109 | 76 | +33 | 6 | Main round |
| 2 | Czech Republic | 3 | 2 | 0 | 1 | 97 | 88 | +9 | 4 | Main round |
| 3 | Egypt | 3 | 1 | 0 | 2 | 94 | 88 | +6 | 2 | |
| 4 | Qatar | 3 | 0 | 0 | 3 | 65 | 113 | −48 | 0 | |

Rules for classification: 1) points; 2) head-to-head points; 3) head-to-head goal difference; 4) head-to-head number of goals scored; 5) goal difference.

| 20 January 2007; 15:45 | Czech Republic | 37–23 | Qatar | AWD-Dome, Bremen; Attendance: 7,100 |
| 20 January 2007; 15:45 | | (18–11) | | AWD-Dome, Bremen; Attendance: 7,100 |
| 20 January 2007; 15:45 | | Report | | AWD-Dome, Bremen; Attendance: 7,100 |

| 20 January 2007; 18:00 | Spain | 33–29 | Egypt | AWD-Dome, Bremen; Attendance: 7,500 |
| 20 January 2007; 18:00 | | (16–16) | | AWD-Dome, Bremen; Attendance: 7,500 |
| 20 January 2007; 18:00 | | Report | | AWD-Dome, Bremen; Attendance: 7,500 |

| 21 January 2007; 15:45 | Qatar | 18–41 | Spain | AWD-Dome, Bremen; Attendance: 4,600 |
| 21 January 2007; 15:45 | | (9–21) | | AWD-Dome, Bremen; Attendance: 4,600 |
| 21 January 2007; 15:45 | | Report | | AWD-Dome, Bremen; Attendance: 4,600 |

| 21 January 2007; 18:00 | Egypt | 30–31 | Czech Republic | AWD-Dome, Bremen; Attendance: 5,700 |
| 21 January 2007; 18:00 | | (17–17) | | AWD-Dome, Bremen; Attendance: 5,700 |
| 21 January 2007; 18:00 | | Report | | AWD-Dome, Bremen; Attendance: 5,700 |

| 22 January 2007; 18:00 | Egypt | 35–24 | Qatar | AWD-Dome, Bremen; Attendance: 4,600 |
| 22 January 2007; 18:00 | | (14–11) | | AWD-Dome, Bremen; Attendance: 4,600 |
| 22 January 2007; 18:00 | | Report | | AWD-Dome, Bremen; Attendance: 4,600 |

| 22 January 2007; 20:00 | Spain | 35–29 | Czech Republic | AWD-Dome, Bremen; Attendance: 6,400 |
| 22 January 2007; 20:00 | | (19–15) | | AWD-Dome, Bremen; Attendance: 6,400 |
| 22 January 2007; 20:00 | | Report | | AWD-Dome, Bremen; Attendance: 6,400 |

=== Group E ===
| Pos | Team | Pld | W | D | L | GF | GA | GD | Pts | Qualification |
|---|---|---|---|---|---|---|---|---|---|---|
| 1 | Hungary | 3 | 3 | 0 | 0 | 89 | 82 | +7 | 6 | Main round |
| 2 | Denmark | 3 | 2 | 0 | 1 | 95 | 75 | +20 | 4 | Main round |
| 3 | Norway | 3 | 1 | 0 | 2 | 88 | 65 | +23 | 2 | |
| 4 | Angola | 3 | 0 | 0 | 3 | 64 | 114 | −50 | 0 | |

Rules for classification: 1) points; 2) head-to-head points; 3) head-to-head goal difference; 4) head-to-head number of goals scored; 5) goal difference.

| 20 January 2007; 18:15 | Norway | 41–13 | Angola | Ostseehalle, Kiel; Attendance: 10,000 |
| 20 January 2007; 18:15 | | (21–8) | | Ostseehalle, Kiel; Attendance: 10,000 |
| 20 January 2007; 18:15 | | Report | | Ostseehalle, Kiel; Attendance: 10,000 |

| 20 January 2007; 20:15 | Denmark | 29–30 | Hungary | Ostseehalle, Kiel; Attendance: 10,000 |
| 20 January 2007; 20:15 | | (11–13) | | Ostseehalle, Kiel; Attendance: 10,000 |
| 20 January 2007; 20:15 | | Report | | Ostseehalle, Kiel; Attendance: 10,000 |

| 21 January 2007; 18:15 | Angola | 20–39 | Denmark | Ostseehalle, Kiel; Attendance: 9,000 |
| 21 January 2007; 18:15 | | (12–18) | | Ostseehalle, Kiel; Attendance: 9,000 |
| 21 January 2007; 18:15 | | Report | | Ostseehalle, Kiel; Attendance: 9,000 |

| 21 January 2007; 20:15 | Hungary | 25–22 | Norway | Ostseehalle, Kiel; Attendance: 9,000 |
| 21 January 2007; 20:15 | | (15–12) | | Ostseehalle, Kiel; Attendance: 9,000 |
| 21 January 2007; 20:15 | | Report | | Ostseehalle, Kiel; Attendance: 9,000 |

| 22 January 2007; 18:15 | Hungary | 34–31 | Angola | Ostseehalle, Kiel; Attendance: 9,000 |
| 22 January 2007; 18:15 | | (19–15) | | Ostseehalle, Kiel; Attendance: 9,000 |
| 22 January 2007; 18:15 | | Report | | Ostseehalle, Kiel; Attendance: 9,000 |

| 22 January 2007; 20:15 | Denmark | 27–25 | Norway | Ostseehalle, Kiel; Attendance: 9,000 |
| 22 January 2007; 20:15 | | (15–13) | | Ostseehalle, Kiel; Attendance: 9,000 |
| 22 January 2007; 20:15 | | Report | | Ostseehalle, Kiel; Attendance: 9,000 |

=== Group F ===
| Pos | Team | Pld | W | D | L | GF | GA | GD | Pts | Qualification |
|---|---|---|---|---|---|---|---|---|---|---|
| 1 | Croatia | 3 | 3 | 0 | 0 | 108 | 72 | +36 | 6 | Main round |
| 2 | Russia | 3 | 1 | 1 | 1 | 94 | 83 | +11 | 3 | Main round |
| 3 | South Korea | 3 | 1 | 1 | 1 | 87 | 92 | −5 | 3 | |
| 4 | Morocco | 3 | 0 | 0 | 3 | 60 | 102 | −42 | 0 | |

Rules for classification: 1) points; 2) head-to-head points; 3) head-to-head goal difference; 4) head-to-head number of goals scored; 5) goal difference.

| 20 January 2007; 16:00 | Croatia | 35–22 | Morocco | Porsche-Arena, Stuttgart; Attendance: 5,900 |
| 20 January 2007; 16:00 | | (18–11) | | Porsche-Arena, Stuttgart; Attendance: 5,900 |
| 20 January 2007; 16:00 | | Report | | Porsche-Arena, Stuttgart; Attendance: 5,900 |

| 20 January 2007; 18:00 | Russia | 32–32 | South Korea | Porsche-Arena, Stuttgart; Attendance: 5,900; Referees: Krstić, Ljubič (SLO) |
| 20 January 2007; 18:00 | Rastvortsev 7 | (15–17) | Cho 8 | Porsche-Arena, Stuttgart; Attendance: 5,900; Referees: Krstić, Ljubič (SLO) |
| 20 January 2007; 18:00 | 3× (yellow card) 5× (suspension) | Report | 3× (yellow card) 2× (suspension) | Porsche-Arena, Stuttgart; Attendance: 5,900; Referees: Krstić, Ljubič (SLO) |

| 21 January 2007; 16:00 | Morocco | 19–35 | Russia | Porsche-Arena, Stuttgart; Attendance: 5,900; Referees: Krstić, Ljubič (SLO) |
| 21 January 2007; 16:00 | El Morabet 5 | (7–15) | Koksharov 11 | Porsche-Arena, Stuttgart; Attendance: 5,900; Referees: Krstić, Ljubič (SLO) |
| 21 January 2007; 16:00 | 3× (yellow card) 6× (suspension) 1× (red card) | Report | 3× (yellow card) 2× (suspension) | Porsche-Arena, Stuttgart; Attendance: 5,900; Referees: Krstić, Ljubič (SLO) |

| 21 January 2007; 18:00 | South Korea | 23–41 | Croatia | Porsche-Arena, Stuttgart; Attendance: 5,900 |
| 21 January 2007; 18:00 | | (9–20) | | Porsche-Arena, Stuttgart; Attendance: 5,900 |
| 21 January 2007; 18:00 | | Report | | Porsche-Arena, Stuttgart; Attendance: 5,900 |

| 22 January 2007; 18:00 | Morocco | 19–32 | South Korea | Porsche-Arena, Stuttgart; Attendance: 5,900 |
| 22 January 2007; 18:00 | | (9–14) | | Porsche-Arena, Stuttgart; Attendance: 5,900 |
| 22 January 2007; 18:00 | | Report | | Porsche-Arena, Stuttgart; Attendance: 5,900 |

| 22 January 2007; 20:00 | Croatia | 32–27 | Russia | Porsche-Arena, Stuttgart; Attendance: 5,900; Referees: Bord, Buy (FRA) |
| 22 January 2007; 20:00 | Džomba 8 | (16–11) | Ivanov 6 | Porsche-Arena, Stuttgart; Attendance: 5,900; Referees: Bord, Buy (FRA) |
| 22 January 2007; 20:00 | 3× (yellow card) 2× (suspension) | Report | 3× (yellow card) 5× (suspension) | Porsche-Arena, Stuttgart; Attendance: 5,900; Referees: Bord, Buy (FRA) |

== President's Cup ==
=== Group I ===
| Pos | Team | Pld | W | D | L | GF | GA | GD | Pts | Qualification |
|---|---|---|---|---|---|---|---|---|---|---|
| 1 | Ukraine | 2 | 2 | 0 | 0 | 56 | 45 | +11 | 4 | 13th place game |
| 2 | Argentina | 2 | 1 | 0 | 1 | 50 | 48 | +2 | 2 | 15th place game |
| 3 | Kuwait | 2 | 0 | 0 | 2 | 48 | 61 | −13 | 0 | 17th place game |

Rules for classification: 1) points; 2) head-to-head points; 3) head-to-head goal difference; 4) head-to-head number of goals scored; 5) goal difference.

| 24 January 2007; 20:00 | Kuwait | 23–33 | Ukraine | Lipperlandhalle, Lemgo; Attendance: 1,611 |
| 24 January 2007; 20:00 | | (10–19) | | Lipperlandhalle, Lemgo; Attendance: 1,611 |
| 24 January 2007; 20:00 | | Report | | Lipperlandhalle, Lemgo; Attendance: 1,611 |

| 25 January 2007; 18:00 | Kuwait | 25–28 | Argentina | Lipperlandhalle, Lemgo; Attendance: 1,700 |
| 25 January 2007; 18:00 | | (10–16) | | Lipperlandhalle, Lemgo; Attendance: 1,700 |
| 25 January 2007; 18:00 | | Report | | Lipperlandhalle, Lemgo; Attendance: 1,700 |

| 27 January 2007; 20:00 | Ukraine | 23–22 | Argentina | Lipperlandhalle, Lemgo; Attendance: 2,179 |
| 27 January 2007; 20:00 | | (13–8) | | Lipperlandhalle, Lemgo; Attendance: 2,179 |
| 27 January 2007; 20:00 | | Report | | Lipperlandhalle, Lemgo; Attendance: 2,179 |

=== Group II ===
| Pos | Team | Pld | W | D | L | GF | GA | GD | Pts | Qualification |
|---|---|---|---|---|---|---|---|---|---|---|
| 1 | Norway | 2 | 2 | 0 | 0 | 61 | 50 | +11 | 4 | 13th place game |
| 2 | South Korea | 2 | 1 | 0 | 1 | 68 | 64 | +4 | 2 | 15th place game |
| 3 | Egypt | 2 | 0 | 0 | 2 | 48 | 63 | −15 | 0 | 17th place game |

Rules for classification: 1) points; 2) head-to-head points; 3) head-to-head goal difference; 4) head-to-head number of goals scored; 5) goal difference.

| 24 January 2007; 18:00 | Egypt | 18–27 | Norway | Lipperlandhalle, Lemgo; Attendance: 1,611 |
| 24 January 2007; 18:00 | | (9–12) | | Lipperlandhalle, Lemgo; Attendance: 1,611 |
| 24 January 2007; 18:00 | | Report | | Lipperlandhalle, Lemgo; Attendance: 1,611 |

| 25 January 2007; 20:00 | Egypt | 30–36 | South Korea | Lipperlandhalle, Lemgo; Attendance: 1,708 |
| 25 January 2007; 20:00 | | (13–16) | | Lipperlandhalle, Lemgo; Attendance: 1,708 |
| 25 January 2007; 20:00 | | Report | | Lipperlandhalle, Lemgo; Attendance: 1,708 |

| 27 January 2007; 18:00 | Norway | 34–32 | South Korea | Lipperlandhalle, Lemgo; Attendance: 2,179 |
| 27 January 2007; 18:00 | | (17–17) | | Lipperlandhalle, Lemgo; Attendance: 2,179 |
| 27 January 2007; 18:00 | | Report | | Lipperlandhalle, Lemgo; Attendance: 2,179 |

=== Group III ===
| Pos | Team | Pld | W | D | L | GF | GA | GD | Pts | Qualification |
|---|---|---|---|---|---|---|---|---|---|---|
| 1 | Brazil | 2 | 2 | 0 | 0 | 63 | 53 | +10 | 4 | 19th place game |
| 2 | Greenland | 2 | 1 | 0 | 1 | 64 | 58 | +6 | 2 | 21st place game |
| 3 | Australia | 2 | 0 | 0 | 2 | 48 | 64 | −16 | 0 | 23rd place game |

Rules for classification: 1) points; 2) head-to-head points; 3) head-to-head goal difference; 4) head-to-head number of goals scored; 5) goal difference.

| 24 January 2007; 15:30 | Greenland | 34–25 | Australia | Gerry Weber Stadion, Halle; Attendance: 7,500 |
| 24 January 2007; 15:30 | | (16–12) | | Gerry Weber Stadion, Halle; Attendance: 7,500 |
| 24 January 2007; 15:30 | | Report | | Gerry Weber Stadion, Halle; Attendance: 7,500 |

| 25 January 2007; 18:30 | Greenland | 30–33 | Brazil | Westfalenhallen, Dortmund |
| 25 January 2007; 18:30 | | (13–18) | | Westfalenhallen, Dortmund |
| 25 January 2007; 18:30 | | Report | | Westfalenhallen, Dortmund |

| 27 January 2007; 14:00 | Australia | 23–30 | Brazil | Westfalenhallen, Dortmund; Attendance: 7,000 |
| 27 January 2007; 14:00 | | (6–17) | | Westfalenhallen, Dortmund; Attendance: 7,000 |
| 27 January 2007; 14:00 | | Report | | Westfalenhallen, Dortmund; Attendance: 7,000 |

=== Group IV ===
| Pos | Team | Pld | W | D | L | GF | GA | GD | Pts | Qualification |
|---|---|---|---|---|---|---|---|---|---|---|
| 1 | Morocco | 2 | 2 | 0 | 0 | 76 | 55 | +21 | 4 | 19th place game |
| 2 | Angola | 2 | 1 | 0 | 1 | 61 | 59 | +2 | 2 | 21st place game |
| 3 | Qatar | 2 | 0 | 0 | 2 | 54 | 77 | −23 | 0 | 23rd place game |

Rules for classification: 1) points; 2) head-to-head points; 3) head-to-head goal difference; 4) head-to-head number of goals scored; 5) goal difference.

| 24 January 2007; 19:30 | Qatar | 27–33 | Angola | Gerry Weber Stadion, Halle; Attendance: 11,000 |
| 24 January 2007; 19:30 | | (14–15) | | Gerry Weber Stadion, Halle; Attendance: 11,000 |
| 24 January 2007; 19:30 | | Report | | Gerry Weber Stadion, Halle; Attendance: 11,000 |

| 25 January 2007; 14:00 | Qatar | 27–44 | Morocco | Westfalenhallen, Dortmund |
| 25 January 2007; 14:00 | | (14–22) | | Westfalenhallen, Dortmund |
| 25 January 2007; 14:00 | | Report | | Westfalenhallen, Dortmund |

| 27 January 2007; 18:30 | Angola | 28–32 | Morocco | Westfalenhallen, Dortmund; Attendance: 2,700 |
| 27 January 2007; 18:30 | | (14–16) | | Westfalenhallen, Dortmund; Attendance: 2,700 |
| 27 January 2007; 18:30 | | Report | | Westfalenhallen, Dortmund; Attendance: 2,700 |

=== 23rd place game ===
| 28 January 2007; 13:00 | Australia | 22–36 | Qatar | Westfalenhallen, Dortmund; Attendance: 5,000 |
| 28 January 2007; 13:00 | | (14–15) | | Westfalenhallen, Dortmund; Attendance: 5,000 |
| 28 January 2007; 13:00 | | Report | | Westfalenhallen, Dortmund; Attendance: 5,000 |

=== 21st place game ===
| 28 January 2007; 17:30 | Greenland | 28–29 | Angola | Westfalenhallen, Dortmund; Attendance: 2,700 |
| 28 January 2007; 17:30 | | (12–14) | | Westfalenhallen, Dortmund; Attendance: 2,700 |
| 28 January 2007; 17:30 | | Report | | Westfalenhallen, Dortmund; Attendance: 2,700 |

=== 19th place game ===
| 28 January 2007; 20:00 | Brazil | 36–29 | Morocco | Westfalenhallen, Dortmund; Attendance: 700 |
| 28 January 2007; 20:00 | | (17–12) | | Westfalenhallen, Dortmund; Attendance: 700 |
| 28 January 2007; 20:00 | | Report | | Westfalenhallen, Dortmund; Attendance: 700 |

=== 17th place game ===
| 28 January 2007; 13:00 | Kuwait | 22–26 | Egypt | Lipperlandhalle, Lemgo; Attendance: 3,212 |
| 28 January 2007; 13:00 | | (14–12) | | Lipperlandhalle, Lemgo; Attendance: 3,212 |
| 28 January 2007; 13:00 | | Report | | Lipperlandhalle, Lemgo; Attendance: 3,212 |

=== 15th place game ===
| 28 January 2007; 15:30 | Argentina | 31–38 | South Korea | Lipperlandhalle, Lemgo; Attendance: 3,212 |
| 28 January 2007; 15:30 | | (13–19) | | Lipperlandhalle, Lemgo; Attendance: 3,212 |
| 28 January 2007; 15:30 | | Report | | Lipperlandhalle, Lemgo; Attendance: 3,212 |

=== 13th place game ===
| 28 January 2007; 18:00 | Ukraine | 22–32 | Norway | Lipperlandhalle, Lemgo; Attendance: 3,468 |
| 28 January 2007; 18:00 | | (12–12) | | Lipperlandhalle, Lemgo; Attendance: 3,468 |
| 28 January 2007; 18:00 | | Report | | Lipperlandhalle, Lemgo; Attendance: 3,468 |

== Main round ==
=== Group I ===
| Pos | Team | Pld | W | D | L | GF | GA | GD | Pts | Qualification |
|---|---|---|---|---|---|---|---|---|---|---|
| 1 | Poland | 5 | 4 | 0 | 1 | 162 | 147 | +15 | 8 (Note: Germany 25–27 Poland) | Quarterfinals |
| 2 | Germany (H) | 5 | 4 | 0 | 1 | 157 | 138 | +19 | 8 | Quarterfinals |
| 3 | Iceland | 5 | 3 | 0 | 2 | 161 | 153 | +8 | 6 (Note: France 24–32 Iceland) | Quarterfinals |
| 4 | France | 5 | 3 | 0 | 2 | 142 | 128 | +14 | 6 | Quarterfinals |
| 5 | Slovenia | 5 | 1 | 0 | 4 | 140 | 165 | −25 | 2 | Ninth place game |
| 6 | Tunisia | 5 | 0 | 0 | 5 | 142 | 173 | −31 | 0 | Eleventh place game |

Rules for classification: 1) points; 2) head-to-head points; 3) head-to-head goal difference; 4) head-to-head number of goals scored; 5) goal difference.
(H) Hosts
Notes:

| 24 January 2007; 17:30 | Slovenia | 29–35 | Germany | Gerry Weber Stadion, Halle; Attendance: 11,000 |
| 24 January 2007; 17:30 | | (14–17) | | Gerry Weber Stadion, Halle; Attendance: 11,000 |
| 24 January 2007; 17:30 | | Report | | Gerry Weber Stadion, Halle; Attendance: 11,000 |

| 24 January 2007; 17:30 | Tunisia | 30–36 | Iceland | Westfalenhallen, Dortmund; Attendance: 5,000 |
| 24 January 2007; 17:30 | | (19–16) | | Westfalenhallen, Dortmund; Attendance: 5,000 |
| 24 January 2007; 17:30 | | Report | | Westfalenhallen, Dortmund; Attendance: 5,000 |

| 24 January 2007; 19:30 | France | 31–22 | Poland | Westfalenhallen, Dortmund; Attendance: 8,000 |
| 24 January 2007; 19:30 | | (11–12) | | Westfalenhallen, Dortmund; Attendance: 8,000 |
| 24 January 2007; 19:30 | | Report | | Westfalenhallen, Dortmund; Attendance: 8,000 |

| 25 January 2007; 16:30 | Tunisia | 28–35 | Germany | Westfalenhallen, Dortmund; Attendance: 12,000 |
| 25 January 2007; 16:30 | | (11–19) | | Westfalenhallen, Dortmund; Attendance: 12,000 |
| 25 January 2007; 16:30 | | Report | | Westfalenhallen, Dortmund; Attendance: 12,000 |

| 25 January 2007; 18:30 | Poland | 35–33 | Iceland | Gerry Weber Stadion, Halle; Attendance: 5,900 |
| 25 January 2007; 18:30 | | (12–14) | | Gerry Weber Stadion, Halle; Attendance: 5,900 |
| 25 January 2007; 18:30 | | Report | | Gerry Weber Stadion, Halle; Attendance: 5,900 |

| 25 January 2007; 20:30 | France | 33–19 | Slovenia | Gerry Weber Stadion, Halle; Attendance: 5,900 |
| 25 January 2007; 20:30 | | (18–10) | | Gerry Weber Stadion, Halle; Attendance: 5,900 |
| 25 January 2007; 20:30 | | Report | | Gerry Weber Stadion, Halle; Attendance: 5,900 |

| 27 January 2007; 16:30 | France | 26–29 | Germany | Westfalenhallen, Dortmund; Attendance: 12,000 |
| 27 January 2007; 16:30 | | (9–14) | | Westfalenhallen, Dortmund; Attendance: 12,000 |
| 27 January 2007; 16:30 | | Report | | Westfalenhallen, Dortmund; Attendance: 12,000 |

| 27 January 2007; 18:00 | Iceland | 32–31 | Slovenia | Gerry Weber Stadion, Halle; Attendance: 7,500 |
| 27 January 2007; 18:00 | | (17–15) | | Gerry Weber Stadion, Halle; Attendance: 7,500 |
| 27 January 2007; 18:00 | | Report | | Gerry Weber Stadion, Halle; Attendance: 7,500 |

| 27 January 2007; 20:00 | Poland | 40–31 | Tunisia | Gerry Weber Stadion, Halle; Attendance: 7,500 |
| 27 January 2007; 20:00 | | (17–13) | | Gerry Weber Stadion, Halle; Attendance: 7,500 |
| 27 January 2007; 20:00 | | Report | | Gerry Weber Stadion, Halle; Attendance: 7,500 |

| 28 January 2007; 15:30 | Germany | 33–28 | Iceland | Westfalenhallen, Dortmund; Attendance: 12,000 |
| 28 January 2007; 15:30 | | (17–11) | | Westfalenhallen, Dortmund; Attendance: 12,000 |
| 28 January 2007; 15:30 | | Report | | Westfalenhallen, Dortmund; Attendance: 12,000 |

| 28 January 2007; 17:30 | Slovenia | 27–38 | Poland | Gerry Weber Stadion, Halle; Attendance: 5,600 |
| 28 January 2007; 17:30 | | (13–17) | | Gerry Weber Stadion, Halle; Attendance: 5,600 |
| 28 January 2007; 17:30 | | Report | | Gerry Weber Stadion, Halle; Attendance: 5,600 |

| 28 January 2007; 19:30 | France | 28–26 | Tunisia | Gerry Weber Stadion, Halle; Attendance: 5,600 |
| 28 January 2007; 19:30 | | (18–11) | | Gerry Weber Stadion, Halle; Attendance: 5,600 |
| 28 January 2007; 19:30 | | Report | | Gerry Weber Stadion, Halle; Attendance: 5,600 |

=== Group II ===
| Pos | Team | Pld | W | D | L | GF | GA | GD | Pts | Qualification |
|---|---|---|---|---|---|---|---|---|---|---|
| 1 | Croatia | 5 | 5 | 0 | 0 | 145 | 128 | +17 | 10 | Quarterfinals |
| 2 | Denmark | 5 | 3 | 0 | 2 | 141 | 134 | +7 | 6 (Note: Denmark 27–23 Spain) | Quarterfinals |
| 3 | Spain | 5 | 3 | 0 | 2 | 152 | 145 | +7 | 6 | Quarterfinals |
| 4 | Russia | 5 | 2 | 0 | 3 | 136 | 142 | −6 | 4 (Note: Russia 26–25 Hungary) | Quarterfinals |
| 5 | Hungary | 5 | 2 | 0 | 3 | 132 | 138 | −6 | 4 | Ninth place game |
| 6 | Czech Republic | 5 | 0 | 0 | 5 | 138 | 157 | −19 | 0 | Eleventh place game |

Rules for classification: 1) points; 2) head-to-head points; 3) head-to-head goal difference; 4) head-to-head number of goals scored; 5) goal difference.
Notes:

| 24 January 2007; 16:15 | Czech Republic | 25–28 | Hungary | SAP Arena, Mannheim; Attendance: 9,000 |
| 24 January 2007; 16:15 | | (10–17) | | SAP Arena, Mannheim; Attendance: 9,000 |
| 24 January 2007; 16:15 | | Report | | SAP Arena, Mannheim; Attendance: 9,000 |

| 24 January 2007; 18:15 | Spain | 33–29 | Russia | SAP Arena, Mannheim; Attendance: 9,000; Referees: Lemme, Ullrich (GER) |
| 24 January 2007; 18:15 | García 10 | (17–15) | Igropulo 6 | SAP Arena, Mannheim; Attendance: 9,000; Referees: Lemme, Ullrich (GER) |
| 24 January 2007; 18:15 | 2× (yellow card) 2× (suspension) | Report | 3× (yellow card) 1× (suspension) | SAP Arena, Mannheim; Attendance: 9,000; Referees: Lemme, Ullrich (GER) |

| 24 January 2007; 20:15 | Denmark | 26–28 | Croatia | SAP Arena, Mannheim; Attendance: 9,000 |
| 24 January 2007; 20:15 | | (12–15) | | SAP Arena, Mannheim; Attendance: 9,000 |
| 24 January 2007; 20:15 | | Report | | SAP Arena, Mannheim; Attendance: 9,000 |

| 25 January 2007; 16:15 | Czech Republic | 26–30 | Russia | SAP Arena, Mannheim; Attendance: 9,000; Referees: Abrahamsen, Kristiansen (NOR) |
| 25 January 2007; 16:15 | Jícha 10 | (14–12) | Koksharov 9 | SAP Arena, Mannheim; Attendance: 9,000; Referees: Abrahamsen, Kristiansen (NOR) |
| 25 January 2007; 16:15 | 3× (yellow card) 8× (suspension) | Report | 3× (yellow card) 6× (suspension) | SAP Arena, Mannheim; Attendance: 9,000; Referees: Abrahamsen, Kristiansen (NOR) |

| 25 January 2007; 18:15 | Croatia | 25–18 | Hungary | SAP Arena, Mannheim; Attendance: 9,000 |
| 25 January 2007; 18:15 | | (12–8) | | SAP Arena, Mannheim; Attendance: 9,000 |
| 25 January 2007; 18:15 | | Report | | SAP Arena, Mannheim; Attendance: 9,000 |

| 25 January 2007; 20:15 | Denmark | 27–23 | Spain | SAP Arena, Mannheim; Attendance: 9,200 |
| 25 January 2007; 20:15 | | (15–11) | | SAP Arena, Mannheim; Attendance: 9,200 |
| 25 January 2007; 20:15 | | Report | | SAP Arena, Mannheim; Attendance: 9,200 |

| 27 January 2007; 16:15 | Croatia | 31–29 | Czech Republic | SAP Arena, Mannheim; Attendance: 12,500 |
| 27 January 2007; 16:15 | | (14–12) | | SAP Arena, Mannheim; Attendance: 12,500 |
| 27 January 2007; 16:15 | | Report | | SAP Arena, Mannheim; Attendance: 12,500 |

| 27 January 2007; 18:15 | Hungary | 31–33 | Spain | SAP Arena, Mannheim; Attendance: 12,500 |
| 27 January 2007; 18:15 | | (15–17) | | SAP Arena, Mannheim; Attendance: 12,500 |
| 27 January 2007; 18:15 | | Report | | SAP Arena, Mannheim; Attendance: 12,500 |

| 27 January 2007; 20:15 | Denmark | 26–24 | Russia | SAP Arena, Mannheim; Attendance: 12,500; Referees: Krstić, Ljubič (SLO) |
| 27 January 2007; 20:15 | Stryger 6 | (16–14) | Koksharov 8 | SAP Arena, Mannheim; Attendance: 12,500; Referees: Krstić, Ljubič (SLO) |
| 27 January 2007; 20:15 | 3× (yellow card) 4× (suspension) | Report | 3× (yellow card) 3× (suspension) | SAP Arena, Mannheim; Attendance: 12,500; Referees: Krstić, Ljubič (SLO) |

| 28 January 2007; 16:15 | Spain | 28–29 | Croatia | SAP Arena, Mannheim; Attendance: 12,500 |
| 28 January 2007; 16:15 | | (16–11) | | SAP Arena, Mannheim; Attendance: 12,500 |
| 28 January 2007; 16:15 | | Report | | SAP Arena, Mannheim; Attendance: 12,500 |

| 28 January 2007; 18:15 | Russia | 26–25 | Hungary | SAP Arena, Mannheim; Attendance: 12,500; Referees: Bord, Buy (FRA) |
| 28 January 2007; 18:15 | Koksharov 10 | (12–15) | Gál 7 | SAP Arena, Mannheim; Attendance: 12,500; Referees: Bord, Buy (FRA) |
| 28 January 2007; 18:15 | 4× (yellow card) 5× (suspension) | Report | 3× (yellow card) 3× (suspension) | SAP Arena, Mannheim; Attendance: 12,500; Referees: Bord, Buy (FRA) |

| 28 January 2007; 20:15 | Denmark | 33–29 | Czech Republic | SAP Arena, Mannheim; Attendance: 12,500 |
| 28 January 2007; 20:15 | | (17–15) | | SAP Arena, Mannheim; Attendance: 12,500 |
| 28 January 2007; 20:15 | | Report | | SAP Arena, Mannheim; Attendance: 12,500 |

== Knockout stage ==
=== Bracket ===
Championship bracket

Quarterfinals
30 January
Spain | 25
Germany | 27
30 January
Croatia | 18
France | 21
30 January
Poland | 28
Russia | 27
30 January
Iceland | 41
Denmark (ET) | 42

Semifinals
1 February
Germany (ET) | 32
France | 31
1 February
Poland (ET) | 36
Denmark | 33

Final
4 February
Germany | 29
Poland | 24
Third place
4 February
France | 27
Denmark | 34

5th place bracket

5–8th place semifinals
1 February
Spain | 27
Croatia | 35
1 February
Russia | 28
Iceland | 25

Fifth place
3 February
Croatia | 34
Russia | 25
Seventh place
3 February
Spain | 40
Iceland | 36

=== Quarterfinals ===
| 30 January 2007; 17:30 | Spain | 25–27 | Germany | Kölnarena, Köln; Attendance: 19,000; Referees: Abrahamsen, Kristiansen (NOR) |
| 30 January 2007; 17:30 | Uríos 8 | (12–15) | Jansen 6 | Kölnarena, Köln; Attendance: 19,000; Referees: Abrahamsen, Kristiansen (NOR) |
| 30 January 2007; 17:30 | 2× (yellow card) 4× (suspension) | Report | 2× (yellow card) 4× (suspension) | Kölnarena, Köln; Attendance: 19,000; Referees: Abrahamsen, Kristiansen (NOR) |

| 30 January 2007; 17:30 | Poland | 28–27 | Russia | Color Line Arena, Hamburg; Attendance: 12,500; Referees: Lemme, Ullrich (GER) |
| 30 January 2007; 17:30 | Bielecki 7 | (16–14) | Koksharov 8 | Color Line Arena, Hamburg; Attendance: 12,500; Referees: Lemme, Ullrich (GER) |
| 30 January 2007; 17:30 | 3× (yellow card) 7× (suspension) 1× (red card) | Report | 3× (yellow card) 6× (suspension) | Color Line Arena, Hamburg; Attendance: 12,500; Referees: Lemme, Ullrich (GER) |

| 30 January 2007; 20:00 | Croatia | 18–21 | France | Kölnarena, Köln; Attendance: 19,000; Referees: Chernega, Poladenko (RUS) |
| 30 January 2007; 20:00 | Balić 5 | (9–10) | Abalo 8 | Kölnarena, Köln; Attendance: 19,000; Referees: Chernega, Poladenko (RUS) |
| 30 January 2007; 20:00 | 2× (yellow card) 4× (suspension) 1× (red card) | Report | 2× (yellow card) 1× (suspension) | Kölnarena, Köln; Attendance: 19,000; Referees: Chernega, Poladenko (RUS) |

30 January 2007
20:00
Iceland
41–42 (ET)
Denmark
Color Line Arena, Hamburg
Attendance: 12,500
Referees: Bord, Buy (FRA)
Guðjónsson 15
(17–16)
three players 9
2× (yellow card) 3× (suspension)
Report
1× (yellow card) 3× (suspension)

FT: 34–34 ET: 7–8

=== 5–8th place semifinals ===
| 1 February 2007; 15:00 | Spain | 27–35 | Croatia | Kölnarena, Köln; Attendance: 16,000; Referees: Lemme, Ullrich (GER) |
| 1 February 2007; 15:00 | Tomás 6 | (12–16) | Balić 9 | Kölnarena, Köln; Attendance: 16,000; Referees: Lemme, Ullrich (GER) |
| 1 February 2007; 15:00 | 2× (yellow card) | Report | 3× (yellow card) 3× (suspension) | Kölnarena, Köln; Attendance: 16,000; Referees: Lemme, Ullrich (GER) |

| 1 February 2007; 17:30 | Russia | 28–25 | Iceland | Color Line Arena, Hamburg; Attendance: 10,000; Referees: Herczeg, Südi (HUN) |
| 1 February 2007; 17:30 | Ivanov 6 | (16–14) | Stefánsson 7 | Color Line Arena, Hamburg; Attendance: 10,000; Referees: Herczeg, Südi (HUN) |
| 1 February 2007; 17:30 | 2× (yellow card) 4× (suspension) | Report | 3× (yellow card) 4× (suspension) | Color Line Arena, Hamburg; Attendance: 10,000; Referees: Herczeg, Südi (HUN) |

=== Semifinals ===
1 February 2007
17:25
Germany
32–31 (ET)
France
Kölnarena, Köln
Attendance: 19,000
Referees: Håkansson, Nilsson (SWE)
Baur, Glandorf 5
(11–12)
Narcisse 8
2× (yellow card) 6× (suspension)
Report
2× (yellow card) 5× (suspension)

FT: 21–21 ET: 6–6, 5–4

1 February 2007
20:00
Poland
36–33 (ET)
Denmark
Color Line Arena, Hamburg
Attendance: 12,500
Referees: Bretó, Huelin (ESP)
Bielecki 8
(15–14)
Boesen, Christiansen 7
3× (yellow card) 5× (suspension) 1× (red card)
Report
2× (yellow card) 6× (suspension)

FT: 26–26 ET: 4–4, 6–3

=== Eleventh place game ===
| 30 January 2007; 15:00 | Tunisia | 25–21 | Czech Republic | Kölnarena, Köln; Attendance: 8,000; Referees: Karbaschi, Kolahdouzan (IRI) |
| 30 January 2007; 15:00 | Hammed 7 | (13–13) | Juříček 5 | Kölnarena, Köln; Attendance: 8,000; Referees: Karbaschi, Kolahdouzan (IRI) |
| 30 January 2007; 15:00 | 3× (yellow card) 3× (suspension) | Report | 3× (yellow card) 5× (suspension) | Kölnarena, Köln; Attendance: 8,000; Referees: Karbaschi, Kolahdouzan (IRI) |

=== Ninth place game ===
| 30 January 2007; 15:00 | Slovenia | 33–34 | Hungary | Color Line Arena, Hamburg; Attendance: 8,000; Referees: Līcis, Stoļarovs (LAT) |
| 30 January 2007; 15:00 | Brumen 12 | (16–16) | Császár 8 | Color Line Arena, Hamburg; Attendance: 8,000; Referees: Līcis, Stoļarovs (LAT) |
| 30 January 2007; 15:00 | 3× (yellow card) 3× (suspension) | Report | 3× (yellow card) 4× (suspension) | Color Line Arena, Hamburg; Attendance: 8,000; Referees: Līcis, Stoļarovs (LAT) |

=== Seventh place game ===
| 3 February 2007; 14:00 | Spain | 40–36 | Iceland | Kölnarena, Köln; Attendance: 18,500; Referees: Chernega, Poladenko (RUS) |
| 3 February 2007; 14:00 | Uríos 9 | (19–13) | G. Sigurðsson, Stefánsson 8 | Kölnarena, Köln; Attendance: 18,500; Referees: Chernega, Poladenko (RUS) |
| 3 February 2007; 14:00 | 3× (yellow card) 5× (suspension) 1× (red card) | Report | 3× (yellow card) 2× (suspension) | Kölnarena, Köln; Attendance: 18,500; Referees: Chernega, Poladenko (RUS) |

=== Fifth place game ===
| 3 February 2007; 16:30 | Croatia | 34–25 | Russia | Kölnarena, Köln; Attendance: 18,000; Referees: Lemme, Ullrich (GER) |
| 3 February 2007; 16:30 | Zrnić 11 | (18–12) | Igropulo 9 | Kölnarena, Köln; Attendance: 18,000; Referees: Lemme, Ullrich (GER) |
| 3 February 2007; 16:30 | 3× (yellow card) | Report | 3× (yellow card) 2× (suspension) | Kölnarena, Köln; Attendance: 18,000; Referees: Lemme, Ullrich (GER) |

=== Third place game ===
| 4 February 2007; 14:00 | France | 27–34 | Denmark | Kölnarena, Köln; Referees: Krstić, Ljubič (SLO) |
| 4 February 2007; 14:00 | Fernandez, Guigou 6 | (15–21) | Christiansen 9 | Kölnarena, Köln; Referees: Krstić, Ljubič (SLO) |
| 4 February 2007; 14:00 | 3× (yellow card) 2× (suspension) | Report | 3× (yellow card) 4× (suspension) | Kölnarena, Köln; Referees: Krstić, Ljubič (SLO) |

=== Final ===
| 4 February 2007; 16:30 | Germany | 29–24 | Poland | Kölnarena, Köln; Attendance: 19,000; Referees: Bord, Buy (FRA) |
| 4 February 2007; 16:30 | Jansen 8 | (17–13) | Jurasik, Tkaczyk 5 | Kölnarena, Köln; Attendance: 19,000; Referees: Bord, Buy (FRA) |
| 4 February 2007; 16:30 | 2× (yellow card) 1× (suspension) | Report | 3× (yellow card) 3× (suspension) | Kölnarena, Köln; Attendance: 19,000; Referees: Bord, Buy (FRA) |

== Ranking and statistics ==
=== Final ranking ===
| Rank | Team |
|---|---|
| Gold medal | Germany |
| Silver medal | Poland |
| Bronze medal | Denmark |
| 4 | France |
| 5 | Croatia |
| 6 | Russia |
| 7 | Spain |
| 8 | Iceland |
| 9 | Hungary |
| 10 | Slovenia |
| 11 | Tunisia |
| 12 | Czech Republic |
| 13 | Norway |
| 14 | Ukraine |
| 15 | South Korea |
| 16 | Argentina |
| 17 | Egypt |
| 18 | Kuwait |
| 19 | Brazil |
| 20 | Morocco |
| 21 | Angola |
| 22 | Greenland |
| 23 | Qatar |
| 24 | Australia |

| Qualified for the 2008 Summer Olympics |
| Qualified for the 2008 Summer Olympics through other tournaments |
| Qualified for the Olympic Qualification Tournament |
| Ineligible to qualify for the Olympics: Greenland do not have a National Olympic Committee recognized by the IOC |

2007 Men's World Champions

Germany
Second Title

Team roster: Henning Fritz, Pascal Hens, Oliver Roggisch, Dominik Klein, Michael Haaß, Sebastian Preiß, Holger Glandorf, Johannes Bitter, Markus Baur, Christian Zeitz, Torsten Jansen, Andrej Klimovets, Michael Kraus, Florian Kehrmann, Lars Kaufmann and Christian Schwarzer.
Head coach: Heiner Brand.

=== All Star Team ===
- Goalkeeper: Henning Fritz (GER)
- Left wing: Eduard Koksharov (RUS)
- Left back: Nikola Karabatić (FRA)
- Pivot: Michael V. Knudsen (DEN)
- Centre back: Michael Kraus (GER)
- Right back: Marcin Lijewski (POL)
- Right wing: Mariusz Jurasik (POL)

=== Other awards ===
- Most Valuable Player: Ivano Balić (CRO)

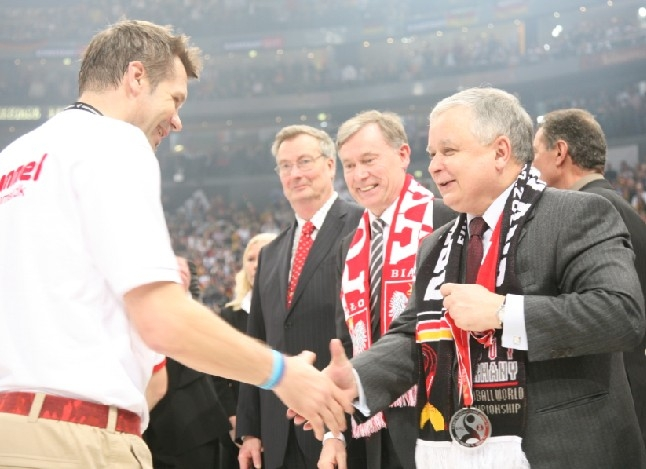
President of Poland Lech Kaczyński gives silver medal for Bogdan Wenta – Polish coach

=== Top goalscorers ===
| Rank | Name | Team | Goals | Shots | % |
|---|---|---|---|---|---|
| 1 | Guðjón Valur Sigurðsson | Iceland | 66 | 93 | 71 |
| 2 | Filip Jícha | Czech Republic | 57 | 100 | 57 |
| 3 | Karol Bielecki | Poland | 56 | 103 | 54 |
| 4 | Eduard Koksharov | Russia | 55 | 77 | 71 |
| 5 | Ivano Balić | Croatia | 53 | 82 | 65 |
| 5 | Snorri Guðjónsson | Iceland | 53 | 89 | 60 |
| 5 | Ólafur Stefánsson | Iceland | 53 | 92 | 58 |
| 8 | Nikola Karabatić | France | 50 | 86 | 58 |
| 9 | Angutimmarik Kreutzmann | Greenland | 49 | 93 | 53 |
| 10 | Cho Chi-hyo | South Korea | 48 | 67 | 72 |
| 10 | Logi Geirsson | Iceland | 48 | 92 | 52 |
| 10 | Alexander Petersson | Iceland | 48 | 74 | 65 |

Source: IHF

=== Top goalkeepers ===
| Rank | Name | Team | % | Saves | Shots |
|---|---|---|---|---|---|
| 1 | Ole Erevik | Norway | 51 | 30 | 59 |
| 2 | Lars Olav Olaussen | Norway | 45 | 23 | 51 |
| 3 | Maik dos Santos | Brazil | 40 | 65 | 163 |
| 4 | Dragan Jerković | Croatia | 39 | 81 | 209 |
| 4 | Nenad Puljezević | Hungary | 39 | 57 | 147 |
| 6 | Johannes Bitter | Germany | 38 | 42 | 112 |
| 7 | Yousif Al-Fadhli | Kuwait | 37 | 88 | 239 |
| 7 | Mirko Alilović | Croatia | 37 | 52 | 140 |
| 7 | Vadym Brazhnyk | Ukraine | 37 | 20 | 54 |
| 7 | Steinar Ege | Norway | 37 | 47 | 127 |
| 7 | Kasper Hvidt | Denmark | 37 | 125 | 337 |
| 7 | Sławomir Szmal | Poland | 37 | 120 | 327 |

Source: IHF
