= Lipperlandhalle =

Indoor sporting arena in Lemgo, Germany

Coordinates: 52°01′01″N 8°54′29″E

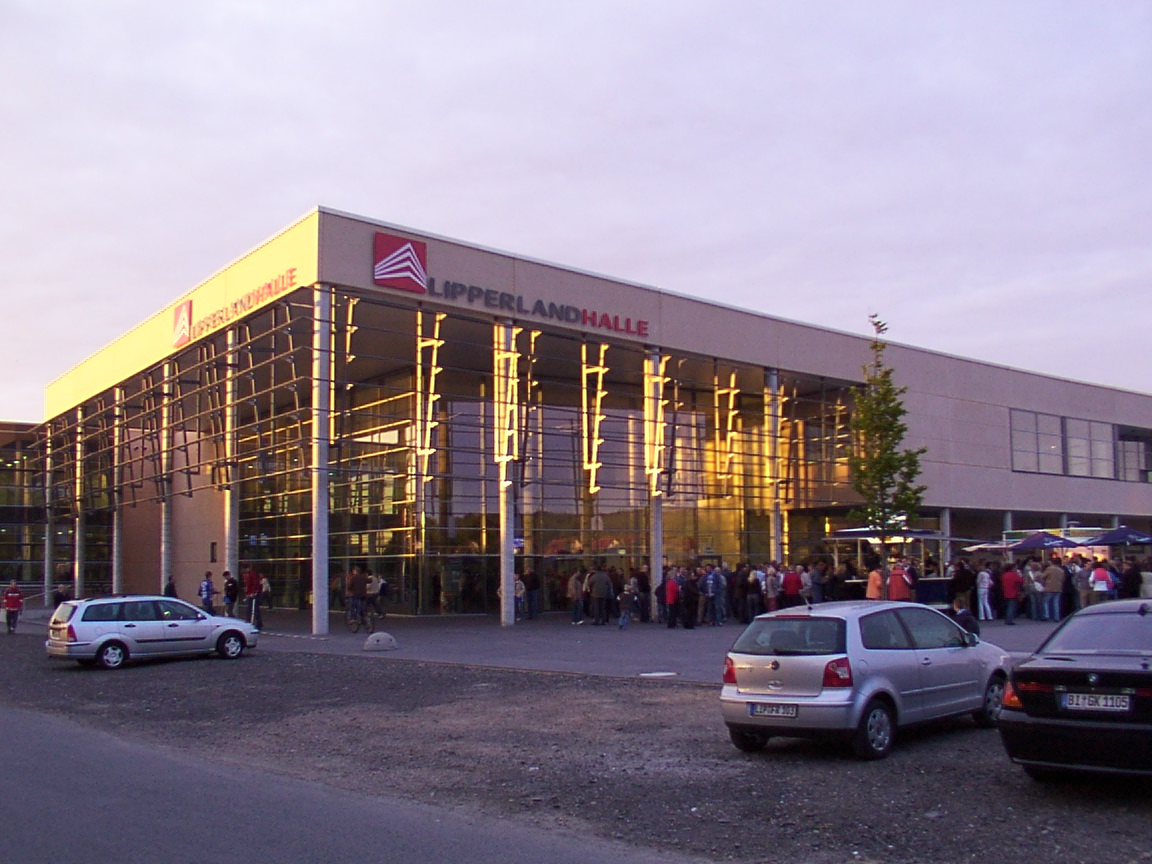
Lipperlandhalle in Lemgo, Germany

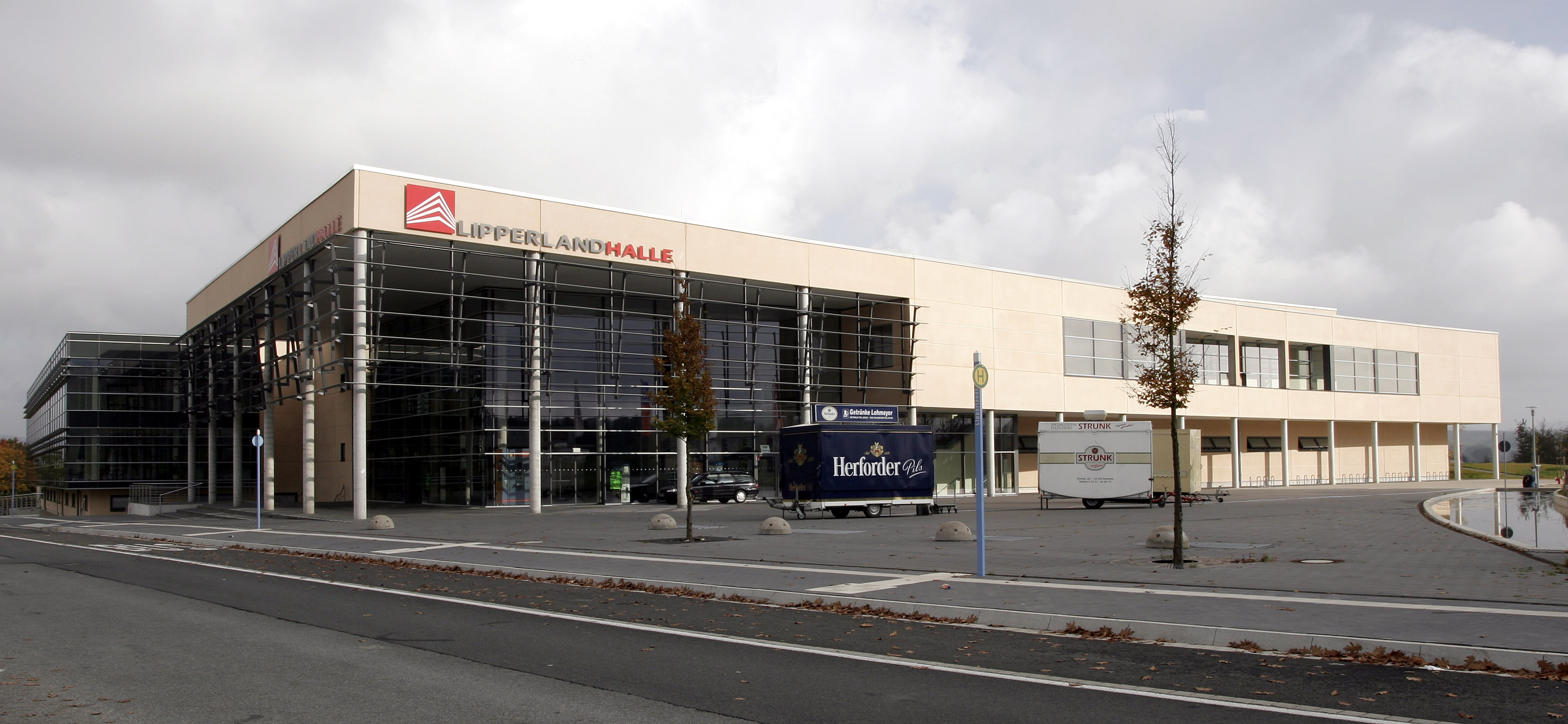
Lipperlandhalle ext, Germany

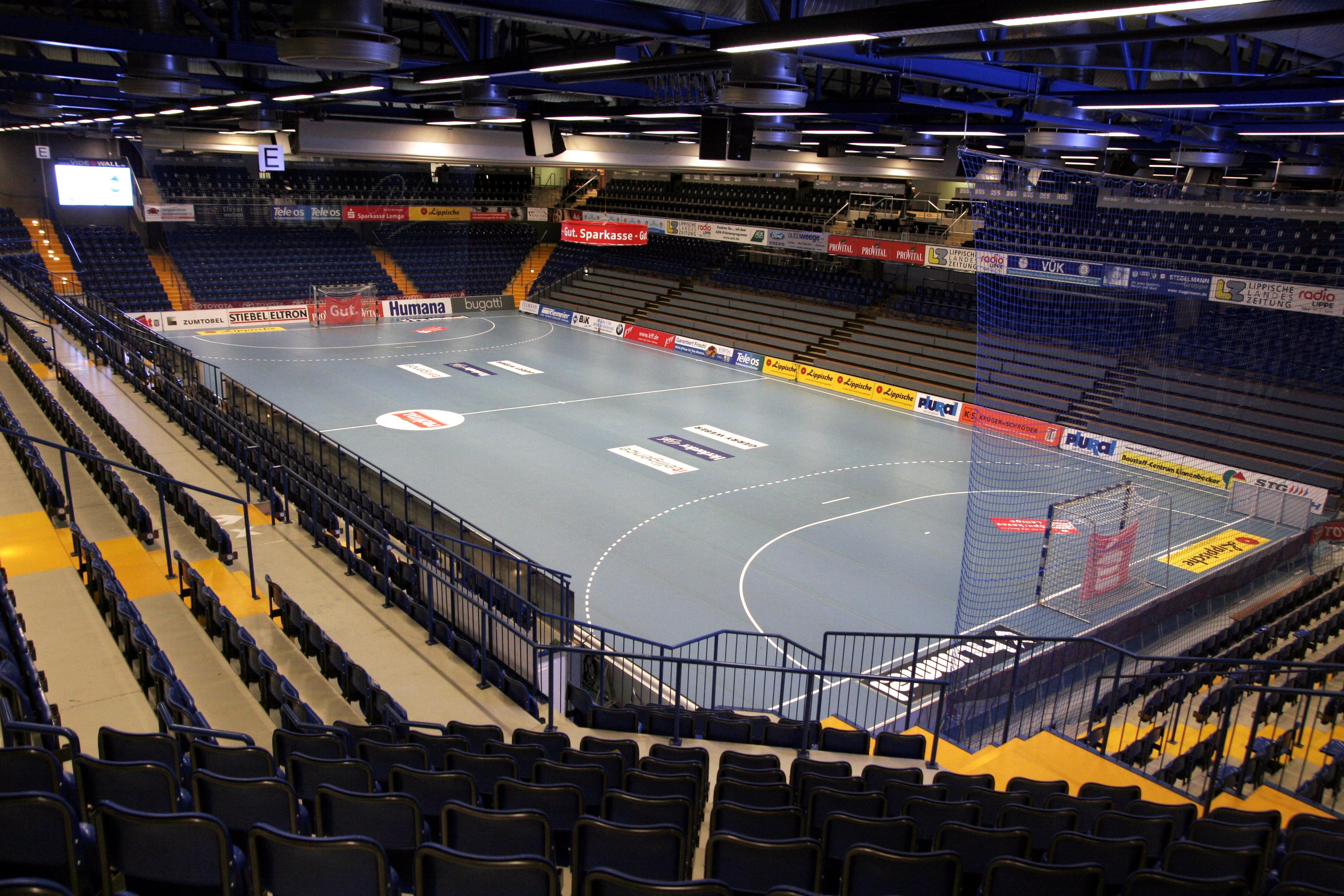
Lipperlandhalle int, Germany

Lipperlandhalle is an indoor sporting arena located at the Innovation Campus Lemgo, Germany. The capacity of the arena is 5,000 people. It hosted some matches at the 2007 World Men's Handball Championship.
