= Rheinlandhalle =

Indoor arena in Krefeld, Germany

Coordinates: 51.339822°N 6.540028°E

- Interactive map of Rheinlandhalle
- Full name: Rheinlandhalle
- Location: Krefeld, Germany
- Capacity: 6,714

Construction
- Opened: 1955

Tenant
- Krefeld Pinguine

Rheinlandhalle is an arena in Krefeld, Germany. It is primarily used for ice hockey, and was home to the Krefeld Pinguine of the Deutsche Eishockey Liga until the König Palast opened in 2004. It opened in 1955 and holds 6,714 spectators.
