= Guardiola =

Guardiola may refer to:

== Plants ==
- Guardiola (plant), a genus of plants in the family Asteraceae

== Places ==
- Guardiola de Berguedà, municipality in Catalonia
- Sant Salvador de Guardiola, previously Guardiola de Bages, a municipality in Catalonia
- Guardiola, a village in the municipality of Bassella, Catalonia
- Guardiola de Font-rubí, capital of the municipality of Font-rubí, Catalonia

== People ==
- Gedeón Guardiola (born 1984), Spanish handballer
- Herizen F. Guardiola (born 1996), American actress
- Illich Guardiola (born 1972), American actor
- Isaías Guardiola (born 1984), Spanish handballer
- Jorge Guardiola (born 1963), Spanish sports shooter
- José Guardiola (actor) (1921–1988), Spanish actor
- José Guardiola (1930–2012), Spanish singer
- José Santos Guardiola (1816–1862), president of Honduras
- Josep "Pep" Guardiola (born 1971), Spanish football manager and former player
- Mirian Guardiola (born 1983), Spanish politician
- Sergi Guardiola (born 1991), Spanish footballer
- Simó de Guardiola y Hortoneda (fl. 1827–1851), Bishop of Urgell
- Thierry Guardiola (born 1971), French tennis player
