= Daniel Stephan =

German handball player (born 1973)

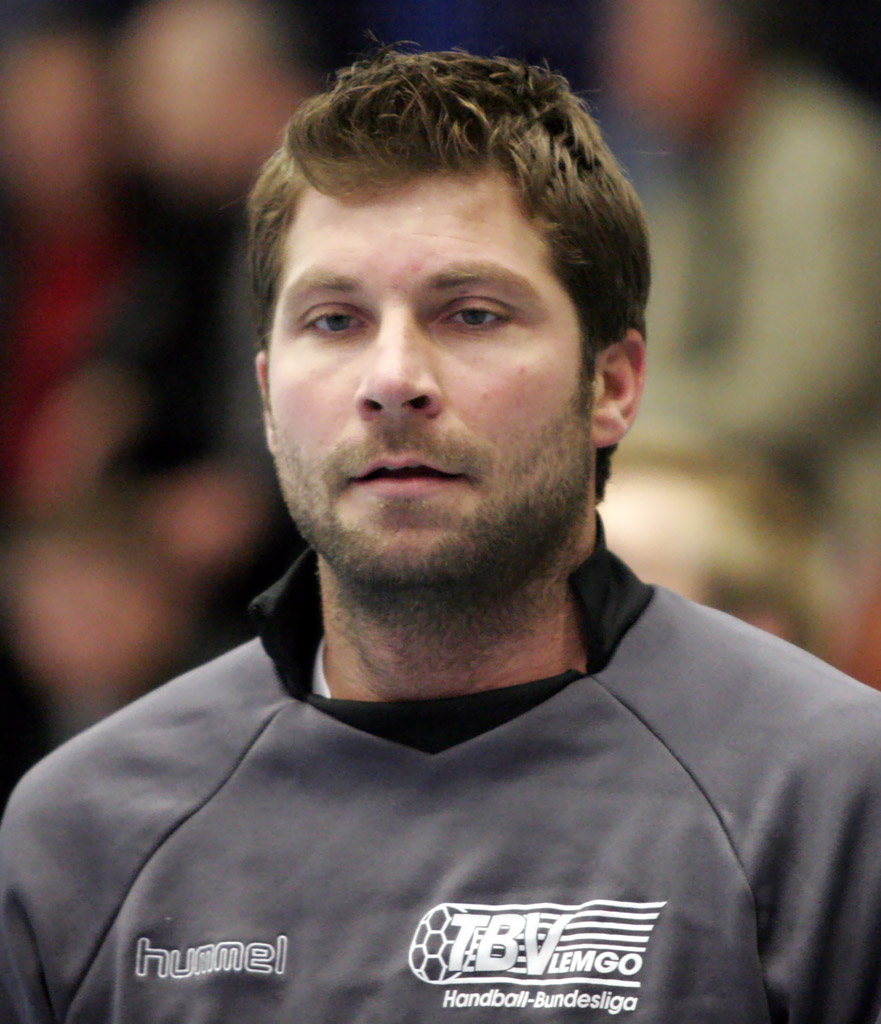
- Stephan in 2007

Personal information
- Born: 3 August 1973 (age 53) Rheinhausen, West Germany
- Height: 1.98 m (6 ft 6 in)

Sport
- Sport: Handball
- Position: Centre back, left back

Senior clubs
- Years: Team
- 1982–1994: OSC Rheinhausen
- 1994–2008: TBV Lemgo
National team
Years	Team	Apps	(Gls)
1994–2008	Germany	183	(589)
Medal record
Olympic Games
Silver medal – second place	2004 Athens	Team competition
European Championship
Gold medal – first place	2004 Slovenia	Team
Silver medal – second place	2002 Sweden	Team
Bronze medal – third place	1998 Sweden	Team

Daniel Stephan (born 3 August 1973) is a German former handball player. He was named IHF World player of the year in 1998 and the German handball player of the years 1997 to 1999.

== Club career ==
In the Handball-Bundesliga Stephan played for OSC Rheinhausen until 1994, when he changed to TBV Lemgo where he played until 2008. With Lemgo, he has won the National Cup of Germany in 1995, 1997 and 2002, the Handball-Bundesliga in 1997 and 2003, the EHF Cup in 2006 as well as the EHF Cup Winner's Cup in 1996.

On 5 April 2005, in a match against HSG Wetzlar, he scored 11 penalties out of 11 attempts, which is a Bundesliga record.

He is considered part of the Lemgo 'golden generation' together with Volker Zerbe, Christian Schwarzer, Florian Kehrmann and Stefan Kretzschmar, who won the European Championship together.

== International career ==
Stephan was a member of the Germany national team from 1995, winning the 2004 European Men's Handball Championship. The same year he won slver medals at the 2004 Olympics. Germany finished only 3rd in the group, but went on to beat Spain in the quarters and Russia in the semis. They then lost to Croatia in the final 24-26.

He retired in 2005, after an injury series not wanting to end, which had let him never take part at a World Men's Handball Championship.

== Post-playing Career ==
In 2007 Stephan became the sporting director at Lemgo. After missing qualification for the 2010-11 EHF Champions League both he and head coach Markus Baur were fired. June the same year he was named the sporting director at HSG Düsseldorf in the 2. Handball-Bundesliga. He was here a year, before he left the position at his own wish.

== Titles ==
- German Championship: 1997, 2003
- German Cup: 1995, 1997, 2002
- German Super Cup: 1997
- EHF Cup Winners' Cup: 1996
- EHF Cup: 2006
