= TBV Lemgo =

German handball club

- Full name: Turn- und Ballsportverein Lemgo Lippe
- Short name: TBV
- Founded: 1924; 102 years ago
- Arena: Lipperlandhalle
- Capacity: 5,000
- President: Burkhard Pohl
- Head coach: Florian Kehrmann
- League: Handball-Bundesliga
- 2025–26: 5th of 18
- Club colours
Home	Away

TBV Lemgo is a handball club from Lemgo, Germany, and is competing in the Handball-Bundesliga.

Location of TBV Lemgo

== History ==
The ascent to one of the best German handball clubs was slow but steady. In the year the Bundesliga was founded, the club was still in the Oberliga, promotion to the 2. Handball-Bundesliga in 1981/82, and since the 1983/84 season, TBV Lemgo has been playing in the top class, growing steadily for more than a decade. developed into a top team. Names such as Lajos Mocsai (coach since 1989), László Marosi (1990–1999 players) or Daniel Stephan (1994–2008 players) are associated with this. They won their first major title in 1995, winning the DHB-Pokal, followed in 1996 by the EHF Cup Winners' Cup. Lajos Mocsai finished his coaching job at TBV with this title. 1997 was the most successful year in the history of the club, led by his successor, Yuri Shevtsov. For the first time in a season, he was able to celebrate a championship title, a cup win and a Super Cup win. The team won the Handball-Bundesliga twice (1997, 2003), the DHB-Pokal 4 times (1995, 1997, 2002, 2020), the DHB-Supercup 4 times (1997, 1999, 2002, 2003), 1 time for the EHF Cup Winner's Cup (1996) and 2 times for the EHF Cup (2006, 2010).

== Crest, colours, supporters ==
=== Naming history ===
Name	Period
Ballsportverein Lemgo 1911	1911–1945
Turn- und Ballspielverein Lemgo	1945–2018
Turn- und Ballspielverein Lemgo Lippe	2018–present

=== Kit manufacturers ===
Period	Kit manufacturer
–2019	(Sweden) Salming
2019–present	(Spain) Joma

=== Kits ===
HOME
2016–17	2017–18

AWAY
2016–17	2017–18

== Accomplishments ==
- Handball-Bundesliga:
  - Gold: 1997, 2003
- DHB-Pokal:
  - Gold: 1995, 1997, 2002, 2020
- DHB-Supercup:
  - Gold: 1997, 1999, 2002, 2003
- EHF Cup Winner's Cup:
  - Gold: 1996
- EHF Cup:
  - Gold: 2006, 2010
- Double

Winners: 1996–97

== Team ==
=== Current squad ===
Squad for the 2025–26 season

TBV Lemgo

Goalkeepers

- 1 (Austria) Constantin Möstl
- 12 (Germany) Linus Borreck
- 99 (Slovenia) Urh Kastelic

Left wingers

- 4 (Switzerland) Samuel Zehnder
- 21 (Germany) Leve Carstensen

Right wingers

- 14 (Netherlands) Bobby Schagen
- 35 (Germany) Jarnes Faust

Line players

- 22 (Sweden) Adam Nyfjäll
- 24 (Switzerland) Joël Willecke

Left backs

- 2 (Austria) Lukas Hutecek
- 8 (Germany) Frederik Simak
- 28 (Germany) Hendrik Wagner

Centre Backs

- 7 (Germany) Jan Mudrow
- 23 (Germany) Tim Suton

Right backs

- 3 (Germany) Nicolai Theilinger
- 25 (Netherlands) Niels Versteijnen

=== Technical staff ===
- Head coach: (Germany) Florian Kehrmann
- Assistant coach: (Germany) Matthias Struck
- Athletic Trainer: (Germany) Meinolf Krome
- Club doctor: (Germany) Dr. Roland Kessler

=== Transfers ===
Transfers for the 2026–27 season

Joining

- (Norway) Christian O'Sullivan (CB) from (Germany) SC Magdeburg
- (Italy) Domenico Ebner (GK) from (Germany) SC DHfK Leipzig
- (Latvia) Jānis Pavels Valkovskis (LB) from (Germany) HSC 2000 Coburg
- (Switzerland) Levin Wanner (RW) from (Switzerland) BSV Bern
- (Switzerland) Lenny Rubin (LB) from (Switzerland) BSV Bern

Leaving

- (Slovenia) Urh Kastelic (GK) to (Croatia) RK Zagreb
- (Germany) Frederik Simak (LB) to (Germany) Füchse Berlin
- (Germany) Jarnes Faust (RW) to (Germany) THW Kiel

=== Transfer history ===
Transfers for the 2025–26 season

Joining

- (Switzerland) Joël Willecke (LP) from (Switzerland) HSC Suhr Aarau
- (Sweden) Adam Nyfjäll (LP) from (Germany) GWD Minden

Leaving

- (Netherlands) Thomas Houtepen (CB) to (Denmark) TTH Holstebro
- (Germany) Jan Brosch (LP) to (Germany) ASV Hamm-Westfalen
- (Germany) Ben Connar Battermann (LB) to (Germany) TV Großwallstadt
- (Germany) Leon Goldbecker (GK) to (Germany) TSG A-H Bielefeld

== Previous squads ==
2019–2020 Team
Shirt No	Nationality	Player	Birth Date	Position
1	Poland	Piotr Wyszomirski	6 January 1988 (age 38)	Goalkeeper
4	Iceland	Bjarki Már Elísson	16 May 1990 (age 36)	Left Winger
5	Germany	Andrej Kogut	9 April 1988 (age 38)	Central Back
7	Spain	Isaías Guardiola	1 October 1984 (age 42)	Right Back
9	Sweden	Jonathan Carlsbogård	19 April 1995 (age 31)	Left Back
10	Netherlands	Fabian van Olphen	30 March 1981 (age 45)	Left Back
13	Germany	Christoph Theuerkauf	13 October 1984 (age 42)	Line Player
14	Netherlands	Bobby Schagen	13 January 1990 (age 36)	Right Winger
18	Germany	Fynn Hangstein	23 March 2000 (age 26)	Central Back
23	Germany	Tim Suton	8 May 1996 (age 30)	Central Back
24	Germany	Lukas Zerbe	17 January 1996 (age 30)	Right Winger
25	Sweden	Peter Johannesson	12 May 1992 (age 34)	Goalkeeper
27	Germany	Jari Lemke	10 February 1997 (age 29)	Left Back
30	Germany	Finn Zecher	1 September 2000 (age 26)	Goalkeeper
34	Sweden	Andreas Cederholm	4 May 1990 (age 36)	Right Back
37	Hungary	Donát Bartók	13 July 1996 (age 30)	Right Back
40	Germany	Maxim Schalles	25 October 1999 (age 26)	Right Winger
41	Germany	Thore Oetjen	3 January 2001 (age 25)	Line Player
42	Germany	Linus Geis	3 February 1998 (age 28)	Left Back
44	Germany	Alexander Reimann	27 October 2000 (age 25)	Left Winger
69	Germany	Christian Klimek	8 January 1990 (age 36)	Line Player
77	Netherlands	Dani Baijens	5 May 1998 (age 28)	Central Back
80	Latvia	Evars Klešniks	18 May 1980 (age 46)	Right Back

2009–2010 Team
Shirt No	Nationality	Player	Birth Date	Position
1	Germany	Carsten Lichtlein	4 November 1980 (age 45)	Goalkeeper
2	Germany	Michael Kraus	28 September 1983 (age 43)	Central Back
3	Hungary	Ferenc Ilyés	20 December 1981 (age 44)	Left Back
7	Germany	Sebastian Preiß	8 February 1981 (age 45)	Line Player
8	Germany	Jens Bechtloff	17 April 1986 (age 40)	Left Winger
11	Germany	Holger Glandorf	30 March 1983 (age 43)	Right Back
12	Sweden	Jesper Larsson	27 July 1973 (age 53)	Goalkeeper
14	Netherlands	Mark Schmetz	3 January 1977 (age 49)	Right Winger
15	Germany	Florian Kehrmann	26 June 1977 (age 49)	Right Winger
16	Czech Republic	Martin Galia	12 April 1979 (age 47)	Goalkeeper
18	Hungary	Tamás Mocsai	9 December 1978 (age 47)	Right Back
19	Germany	Martin Strobel	5 June 1986 (age 40)	Central Back
20	Germany	Rolf Hermann	1 December 1981 (age 44)	Right Back
22	Iceland	Vignir Svavarsson	20 June 1980 (age 46)	Line Player
23	Iceland	Logi Geirsson	10 October 1982 (age 44)	Left Winger
77	Czech Republic	Daniel Kubeš	7 February 1978 (age 48)	Left Back

2005–2006 Team
Shirt No	Nationality	Player	Birth Date	Position
1	Germany	Carsten Lichtlein	4 November 1980 (age 45)	Goalkeeper
3	Germany	Sven-Sören Christophersen	9 May 1985 (age 41)	Left Back
4	Germany	Daniel Stephan	3 August 1973 (age 53)	Central Back
5	Germany	André Tempelmeier	25 May 1967 (age 59)	Right Winger
7	Germany	Sebastian Preiß	8 February 1981 (age 45)	Line Player
8	Germany	Christian Schwarzer	23 October 1969 (age 56)	Line Player
9	Iceland	Ásgeir Örn Hallgrímsson	17 February 1984 (age 42)	Right Back
10	Germany	Maximilian Ramota	29 July 1977 (age 49)	Left Back
11	Germany	Volker Zerbe	30 June 1968 (age 58)	Right Back
12	Germany	Jörg Zereike	12 March 1978 (age 48)	Goalkeeper
15	Germany	Florian Kehrmann	26 June 1977 (age 49)	Right Winger
16	Germany	René Selke	24 July 1984 (age 42)	Goalkeeper
17	Germany	Michael Binder	4 August 1981 (age 45)	Left Winger
22	Germany	Markus Baur	22 January 1971 (age 55)	Central Back
23	Iceland	Logi Geirsson	10 October 1982 (age 44)	Left Winger
31	Germany	André Kropp	8 September 1984 (age 42)	Line Player
39	Czech Republic	Filip Jícha	19 April 1982 (age 44)	Left Back

2002–2003 Team
Shirt No	Nationality	Player	Birth Date	Position
1	Germany	Christian Ramota	14 April 1973 (age 53)	Goalkeeper
2	Germany	Matthias Struck	15 May 1982 (age 44)	Right Back
3	Germany	Achim Schürmann	29 January 1974 (age 52)	Line Player
4	Germany	Daniel Stephan	3 August 1973 (age 53)	Central Back
5	Germany	André Tempelmeier	25 May 1967 (age 59)	Right Winger
7	Germany	Ulf Ganschow	17 April 1975 (age 51)	Left Winger
8	Germany	Christian Schwarzer	23 October 1969 (age 56)	Line Player
10	Germany	Maximilian Ramota	29 July 1977 (age 49)	Left Back
11	Germany	Volker Zerbe	30 June 1968 (age 58)	Right Back
12	Germany	Jörg Zereike	12 March 1978 (age 48)	Goalkeeper
13	Switzerland	Marc Baumgartner	4 March 1971 (age 55)	Left Back
14	Germany	Rico Bonath	5 December 1983 (age 42)	Right Back
15	Germany	Florian Kehrmann	26 June 1977 (age 49)	Right Winger
17	Germany	Michael Binder	4 August 1981 (age 45)	Left Winger
21	Switzerland	Carlos Lima	21 February 1970 (age 56)	Left Winger
22	Germany	Markus Baur	22 January 1971 (age 55)	Central Back
25	Germany	Robin Kothe	10 April 1976 (age 50)	Line Player

2001–2002 Team
Shirt No	Nationality	Player	Birth Date	Position
1	Germany	Christian Ramota	14 April 1973 (age 53)	Goalkeeper
2	Germany	Matthias Struck	15 May 1982 (age 44)	Right Back
3	Germany	Achim Schürmann	29 January 1974 (age 52)	Line Player
4	Germany	Daniel Stephan	3 August 1973 (age 53)	Central Back
5	Germany	André Tempelmeier	25 May 1967 (age 59)	Right Winger
7	Germany	Ulf Ganschow	17 April 1975 (age 51)	Left Winger
8	Germany	Christian Schwarzer	23 October 1969 (age 56)	Line Player
9	Germany	Alexander Koke	2 April 1979 (age 47)	Central Back
10	Germany	Jörg Schulte	6 January 1980 (age 46)	Left Back
11	Germany	Volker Zerbe	30 June 1968 (age 58)	Right Back
12	Germany	Marco Stange	7 July 1975 (age 51)	Goalkeeper
13	Switzerland	Marc Baumgartner	4 March 1971 (age 55)	Left Back
14	Germany	Jochen Fraatz	14 May 1963 (age 63)	Left Winger
15	Germany	Florian Kehrmann	26 June 1977 (age 49)	Right Winger
16	Germany	Julius Kaiser	22 May 1981 (age 45)	Goalkeeper
22	Germany	Markus Baur	22 January 1971 (age 55)	Central Back
23	Germany	Lars-Henrik Walther	21 April 1968 (age 58)	Line Player

1998–1999 Team
Shirt No	Nationality	Player	Birth Date	Position
1	Germany	Lutz Grosser	14 March 1961 (age 65)	Goalkeeper
3	Germany	Achim Schürmann	29 January 1974 (age 52)	Line Player
4	Germany	Daniel Stephan	3 August 1973 (age 53)	Central Back
5	Germany	André Tempelmeier	25 May 1967 (age 59)	Right Winger
6	Hungary	László Marosi	26 November 1962 (age 63)	Left Back
7	Germany	Ulf Ganschow	17 April 1975 (age 51)	Left Winger
8	Belarus	Andrej Siniak	28 April 1972 (age 54)	Right Winger
9	Sweden	Andreas Larsson	13 August 1974 (age 52)	Right Back
10	Germany	Jens Lause	30 October 1968 (age 57)	Left Winger
11	Germany	Volker Zerbe	30 June 1968 (age 58)	Right Back
13	Germany	Lars-Henrik Walther	21 April 1968 (age 58)	Left Back
14	BelarusGermany	Gennadij Chalepo	2 January 1969 (age 57)	Central Back
22	Denmark	Kasper Hvidt	6 February 1976 (age 50)	Goalkeeper

== Retired numbers ==
TBV Lemgo retired numbers
N°	Nationality	Player	Position	Tenure
6	(Hungary)	László Marosi	Left Back, Left Winger	1990–1999

== EHF ranking ==
As of 22 October 2026

Rank	Team	Points
89	(Luxembourg) Handball Esch	49
90	(Poland) SPR Chrobry Głogów	48
91	(Luxembourg) HB Dudelange	48
92	(Germany) TBV Lemgo	48
93	(Lithuania) VHC Šviesa	48
94	(Poland) KPR Ostrovia Ostrów Wielkopolski	47
95	(Greece) AC Diomidis Argous	47

== Former club members ==
=== Notable former players ===
- (Germany) Markus Baur (2001–2007)
- (Germany) Jens Bechtloff (2007–2015)
- (Germany) Mike Bezdicek (1989–1994, 1995–1998, 2004–2005)
- (Germany) Sven-Sören Christophersen (2003–2006, 2007–2008)
- (Germany) Nils Dresrüsse (2011–2016)
- (Germany) Ulf Ganschow (1994–2003)
- (Germany) Holger Glandorf (2009–2011)
- (Germany) Lutz Grosser (1991–2001)
- (Germany) Hans-Jürgen Grund (1982–1984)
- (Germany) Michael Hegemann (2006–2008)
- (Germany) Benjamin Herth (2013–2015)
- (Germany) Rolf Hermann (2007–2017)
- (Germany) Fynn Holpert (1989–1991, 1994–1998)
- (Germany) Tim Hornke (2014–2019)
- (Germany) Lars Kaufmann (2007–2009)
- (Germany) Florian Kehrmann (1999–2014)
- (Germany) Michael Kraus (2007–2010)
- (Germany) Finn Lemke (2011–2015)
- (Germany) Carsten Lichtlein (2005–2013)
- (Germany) Nikolai Link (2010–2012)
- (Germany) Arne Niemeyer (2015–2016)
- (Germany) Rainer Niemeyer (1987–1988)
- (Germany) Hendrik Pekeler (2012–2015)
- (Germany) Sebastian Preiß (2005–2013)
- (Germany) Christian Ramota (2001–2005)
- (Germany) Timm Schneider (2012–2015)
- (Germany) Achim Schürmann (1994–2003)
- (Germany) Christian Schwarzer (2001–2007)
- (Germany) Daniel Stephan (1994–2008)
- (Germany) Martin Strobel (2008–2013)
- (Germany) Tim Suton (2014–2015, 2016–)
- (Germany) Christoph Theuerkauf (2010–2012, 2016–2021)
- (Germany) Lukas Zerbe (2019–)
- (Germany) Volker Zerbe (1984–2006)
- (Germany) Jörg Zereike (2002–2009)
- (Germany) Patrick Zieker (2012–2019)
- (Austria) Thomas Bauer (2013–2015)
- (Austria) Lukas Hutecek (2021–)
- (Belarus) (Germany) Gennadij Chalepo (1998–1999)
- (Belarus) Andrej Siniak (1996–2001)
- (Chile) Erwin Feuchtmann (2015–2016)
- (Czech Republic) Martin Galia (2008–2011)
- (Czech Republic) Filip Jícha (2005–2007)
- (Czech Republic) Daniel Kubeš (2008–2010)
- (Denmark) Lasse Boesen (2007–2008)
- (Denmark) Kasper Hvidt (1998–2000)
- (Denmark) Kasper Nielsen (2015)
- (Estonia) Mait Patrail (2011–2012)
- (France) Philippe Julia (1996–1997)
- (Georgia (country)) Sergo Datukashvili (2010–2011)
- (Hungary) Donát Bartók (2015–2019)
- (Hungary) Ferenc Ilyés (2009–2011)
- (Hungary) László Marosi (1990–1999)
- (Hungary) Tamás Mocsai (1989–1996, 2006–2010)
- (Iceland) Logi Geirsson (2004–2010)
- (Iceland) Ásgeir Örn Hallgrímsson (2005–2007)
- (Iceland) Bjarki Már Elísson (2019–2022)
- (Iceland) Vignir Svavarsson (2008–2010)
- (Iceland) Sigurður Sveinsson (1983–1988)
- (Israel) Avishay Smoler (2010–2012)
- (Latvia) Evars Klešniks (2020)
- (Netherlands) Dani Baijens (2018–2021)
- (Netherlands) Niko Blaauw (2020–)
- (Netherlands) Arjan Haenen (2009–2016)
- (Netherlands) Bobby Schagen (2019–)
- (Netherlands) Mark Schmetz (2008–2010)
- (Netherlands) Fabian van Olphen (2017–2020)
- (Poland) Piotr Wyszomirski (2016–2020)
- (Romania) Ionuț Ramba (2015–2017)
- (Russia) Sergey Pogorelov (1999–2000)
- (Russia) Azat Valiullin (2016–2018)
- (Spain) Jaume Fort (1999–2001)
- (Spain) Gedeon Guardiola (2020–)
- (Spain) Isaías Guardiola (2018–)
- (Switzerland) Marc Baumgartner (1994–1998, 2000–2005)
- (Switzerland) Carlos Lima (2002–2004)
- (Switzerland) Manuel Liniger (2010–2012)
- (Sweden) Dan Beutler (2015)
- (Sweden) Jonathan Carlsbogård (2018–2022)
- (Sweden) Andreas Cederholm (2019–2022)
- (Sweden) Peter Johannesson (2017–2022)
- (Sweden) Andreas Larsson (1997–1999)
- (Sweden) Jesper Larsson (2009)
- (Sweden) Rickard Lönn (2013–2014)
- (Sweden) Anton Månsson (2015–2017)
- (Sweden) Jonathan Stenbäcken (2015–2017)

=== Former coaches ===
Seasons	Coach	Country
1989–1996	Lajos Mocsai	(Hungary)
1996–2001	Yuri Shevtsov	(Belarus)
2001–2002	Zbigniew Tluczynski	(Poland)
2002–2007	Volker Mudrow	(Germany)
2007	Peter Meisinger	(Germany)
2007	Volker Zerbe	(Germany)
2008–2009	Markus Baur	(Germany)
2009–2011	Volker Mudrow	(Germany)
2011–2013	Dirk Beuchler	(Germany)
2013–2014	Niels Pfannenschmidt	(Germany)
2014–	Florian Kehrmann	(Germany)
