= Christian Schwarzer =

German handball player (born 1969)

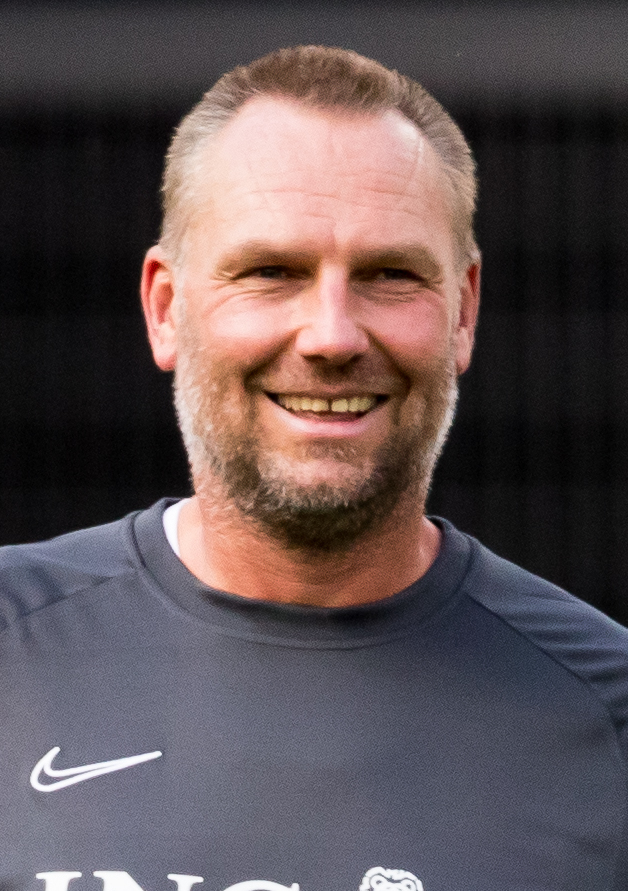
- Schwarzer in 2019

Personal information
- Born: 23 October 1969 (age 56) Braunschweig, West Germany

Sport
- Sport: Handball
- Position: Pivot

Youth career
- Years: Team
- 1979–1983: TSG Bergedorf
- 1983–1987: Wandsbek 72

Senior clubs
- Years: Team
- 1987–1991: VfL Fredenbeck
- 1991–1999: TV Niederwürzbach
- 1999–2001: FC Barcelona Handbol
- 2001–2007: TBV Lemgo
- 2007–2009: Rhein-Neckar Löwen
National team
| Years | Team | Apps | (Gls) |
| 1989–2008 | Germany | 319 | (966) |

Teams managed
- 2011–2015: Germany youth teams
Medal record
Representing Germany
Olympic Games
| Silver medal – second place | 2004 Athens | Team competition |
World Men's Handball Championship
| Gold medal – first place | 2007 Germany | Team competition |
| Silver medal – second place | 2003 Portugal | Team competition |
European Men's Handball Championship
| Gold medal – first place | 2004 Slovenia | Team competition |
| Silver medal – second place | 2002 Sweden | Team competition |
| Silver medal – second place | 1998 Italy | Team competition |

Christian "Blacky" Schwarzer (born 23 October 1969) is a German handball coach and former player. As a member of the Germany national team, he won the world championship in 2007 and the silver medal at the 2004 Olympics.

He was awarded the Silbernes Lorbeerblatt for his win in the 2007 World Championship. He was included in the European Handball Federation Hall of Fame in 2023. He also holds the record for most goals on the German national team with 966 as well as the second most caps with 319.

Schwarzer also played beach handball, where he won the German Beach handball championship in 2003.

== Playing career ==
Born in Braunschweig, Schwarzer played for VfL Fredenbeck from 1987 to 1991; Schwarzer's first game for the Germany national team was on 21 November 1989, against the German Democratic Republic in Wilhelmshaven.

Schwarzer played for TV Niederwürzbach from 1991 to 1999. While playing for FC Barcelona Handbol from 1999 to 2001, the German handball player of the year 2001, won the Spanish Championship, the Copa del Rey de Balonmano and the EHF Champions League in 2000. Since 2001, he has played for TBV Lemgo, with which he won the DHB-Pokal in 2002, the Handball-Bundesliga in 2003 and the EHF Cup in 2006.

He is considered part of the Lemgo 'golden generation' together with Daniel Stephan, Volker Zerbe, Florian Kehrmann and Stefan Kretzschmar, who won the European Championship together.

During his career, Schwarzer took part in six World Men's Handball Championships, five European Men's Handball Championships and three Olympic Games. He has participated in 310 international matches, with 949 goals. In 2004, he retired but was reactivated for the 2007 World Men's Handball Championship. After becoming World champion, he stepped down again and became a handball coach.

== Coaching career ==
In 2009, Schwarzer became the Junior coordinator at the Deutscher Handballbund and the Handball-Verbandes Saar.

In 2011, he became the coach for the German youth team, replacing Martin Heuburger. He was in this position until 2015.
