= Stefan Kretzschmar =

German handball player (born 1973)

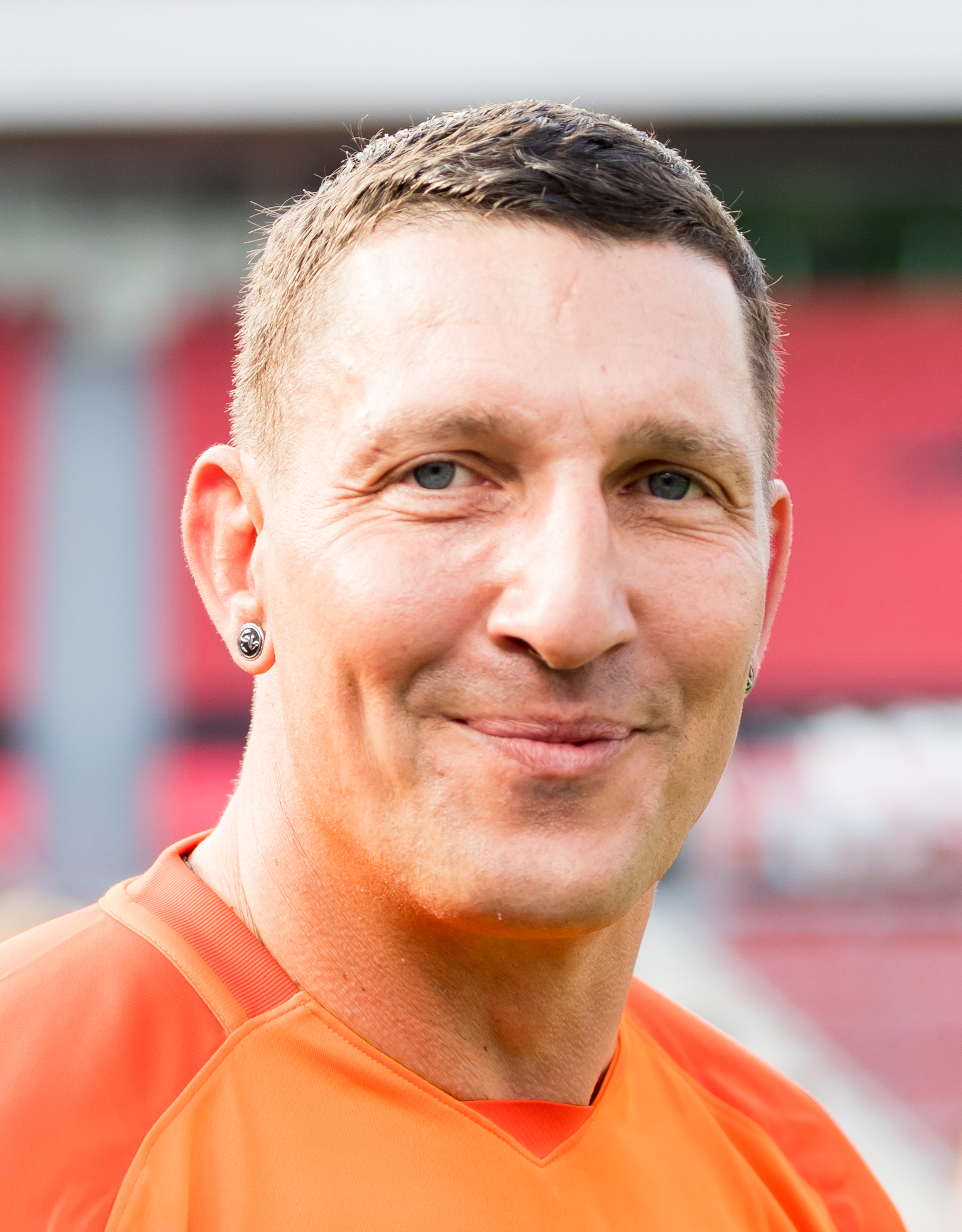
- Kretzschmar in 2019

Personal information
- Born: 17 February 1973 (age 53) Leipzig, East Germany
- Height: 1.90 m (6 ft 3 in)
- Weight: 95 kg (209 lb)

Sport
- Sport: Handball
- Position: Left wing
- Current club: SC Magdeburg

Youth career
- Years: Team
- 1985-1991: SC Dynamo Berlin

Senior clubs
- Years: Team
- 1991-1993: Blau-Weiß Spandau
- 1993-1996: VfL Gummersbach
- 1996-2007: SC Magdeburg
National team
Years	Team	Apps	(Gls)
1993-2004	Germany	218	(817)
Medal record
Olympic Games
Silver medal – second place	2004 Athens	Team
World Championship
Silver medal – second place	2003 Portugal	Team
European Championship
Silver medal – second place	2002 Sweden	Team
Bronze medal – third place	1998 Italy	Team

Stefan Kretzschmar (German pronunciation: [ˈʃtɛfan ˈkrɛtʃmar]; born 17 February 1973) is a retired professional German handball player. He was a three-time Olympic athlete and winner of the Olympic silver medal with the German team in 2004.

He was the sporting director at Füchse Berlin between 2020 and 2025. and a handball expert on the streaming service Dyn Media. He was included in the European Handball Federation Hall of Fame in 2023.

== Career ==
Kretzschmar is considered part of the Lemgo 'golden generation' together with Daniel Stephan, Christian Schwarzer, Florian Kehrmann, and Volker Zerbe, who won the European Championship together. He started playing handball at the age of 6, and at the age of 12, he joined a training program in Berlin, which led to him joining the youth team at SC Dynamo Berlin, where he came to play as a left wing. Two years later, he won the DDR youth championship with the club.

In the 1991/92 season, he became a first team player at the Handball-Bundesliga team Blau-Weiß Spandau, which had just fused with SC Dynamo Berlin. With 125 goals, he was the team topscorer.

=== Gummersbach ===
In 1993, he joined VfL Gummersbach under Heiner Brand. He debuted for the German national team later the same year on October 8th 1993 against Switzerland. In 1994, he was chosen as the German player of the year, and represented the German team at the 1994 European Championship in Portugal as his first major international tournament. Germany finished 9th and Kretzschmar was part of the all star team.

In 1995, he was for a second time named German player of the year. In 1996, he was removed from the German national team due to disagreements with the newly appointed head coach, his former club team coach, Heiner Brand.

=== Magdeburg ===
In 1996, he joined SC Magdeburg, where he won the German Supercup in 1996. In 1997, he made his comeback for the German national team in a match against Norway on October 31st. Two years later, he won Bronze medals at the 1998 European Men's Handball Championship.

In 2001, he won the EHF European League, the German Championship, the IHF Super Globe and the German Supercup with SC Magdeburg.

At the 2002 European Championship in Sweden, he won silver medals with the German team, losing to the hosts in the final. Later the same year, he won the EHF Champions League. This was the first time a German club won that tournament.

At the 2003 World Championship, he reached the semifinal, where he broke his finger against France.

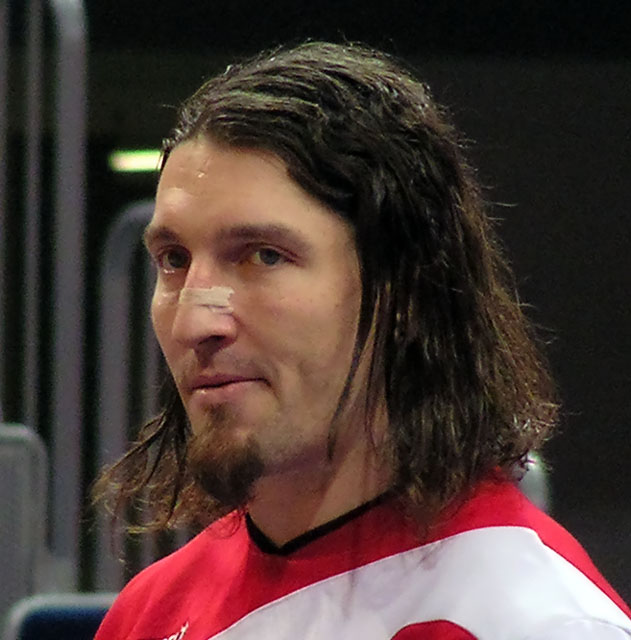
Stefan Kretzschmar (2007)

Because of the operation, he was not part of the German team that won the 2004 European Championship. At the 2004 Olympics, he had to content with a silver medal, as they lost to Croatia in the final. He then retired from the German national team, alongside a list of other players. The German newspaper Süddeutsche Zeitung described it as the end of the Golden Generation.

He ended his active career on 14 July 2007 and became the sporting director at SC Magdeburg.

== Post-playing career ==
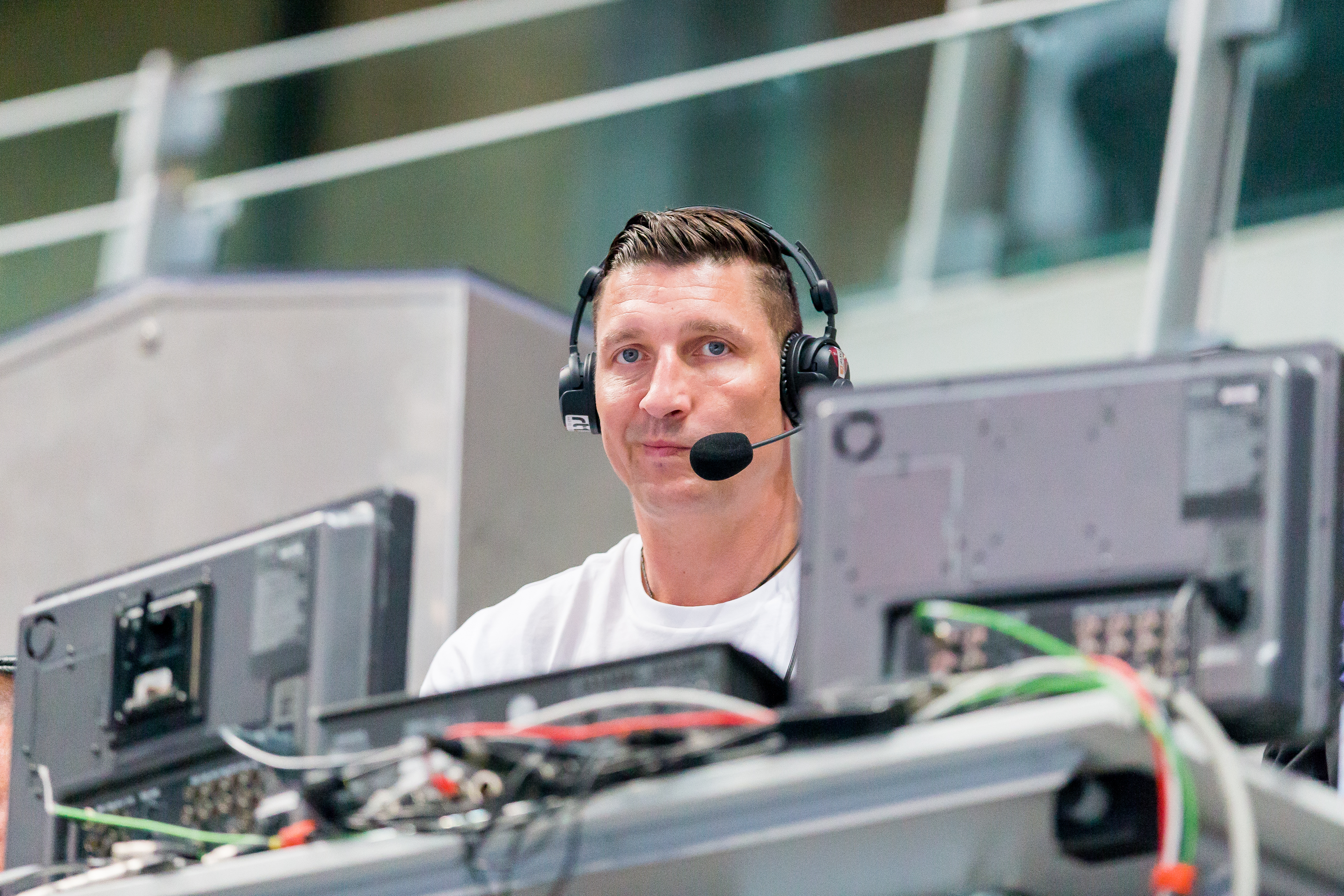
Kretzschmar as Commentator at the 2016 European Championship

He stopped as the sporting director at SC Magdeburg in 2009. He instead became a part of the board of SC DHfK Leipzig Handball at a volunteer basis, where he was until 2019.

In 2020 he became the sporting director at Füchse Berlin In July 2025 the club won their first ever Bundesliga title and reached the final of the EHF Champions League for the first time. Despite the success, he was fired just two matches into the following season along with head coach Jaron Siewert after a public disagreement with managing director Bob Hanning.

From September 2009 to June 2017 he worked as a handball expert on the German tv-channel Sport1.

From 2023 he has been a handball expert on Dyn Media.

== Personal life ==
He is the son of Peter Kretzschmar, a legendary handball player and coach in the former GDR (East Germany) and Waltraud Kretzschmar, a former handball player for the East German team and winner of Olympic team medals in silver (1976) and bronze (1980). His daughter Lucie-Marie Kretzschmar is a professional handball player too and member of the German national team.

He is well known for his many tattoos and piercings.

His biography, Anders als erwartet, was released in October 2008.

== Honours ==
- Handballer of the year: 1994, 1995
- EHF Hall of Fame in 2023.
- Silver Medal (Runners-up), World Championships, 2003
- International All Star-Team: 1994
- DHB-Supercup: 2007
- Handball European Cup: 2002
- EHF Cup: 2007

== See also ==
- Sportvereinigung (SV) Dynamo
