= Volker Zerbe =

German handball player (born 1968)

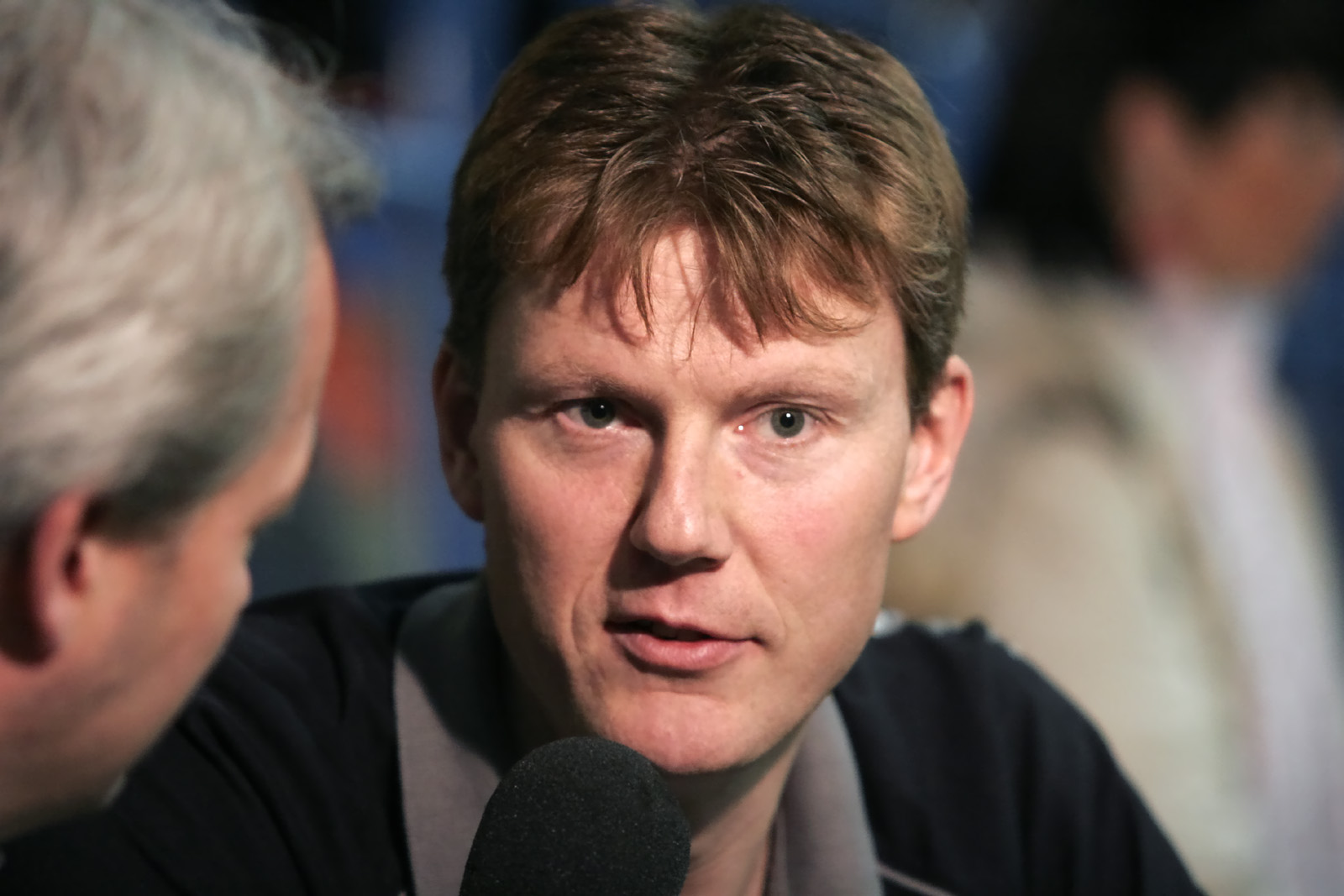
- Zerbe in 2007

Personal information
- Nationality: German
- Born: 30 June 1968 (age 58) Lemgo, Germany
- Height: 2.11 m (6 ft 11 in)

Sport
- Sport: Handball
- Position: Right back

Youth career
- Years: Team
- –: TV Lemgo
- 1984–1986: TBV Lemgo

Senior clubs
- Years: Team
- 1986–2006: TBV Lemgo
National team
Years	Team	Apps	(Gls)
1987–2004	Germany	284	(777)

Teams managed
- 2007: TBV Lemgo
Medal record
Olympic Games
Silver medal – second place	2004 Athens	Team Competition
World Men's Handball Championship
Silver medal – second place	2003 Portugal	Team competition
European Championship
Gold medal – first place	2004 Slovenia	Team competition
Silver medal – second place	2002 Sweden	Team competition

Volker Zerbe (born 30 June 1968) is a German former handball player and manager. He received a silver medal at the 2004 Summer Olympics in Athens with the German national team He is European champion from 2004. He played his entire professional career at TBV Lemgo, where he was the captain of the club.

He was considered one of the best defensive players of his time, and in 2024 he was inducted into the EHF Hall of Fame.

In March 2005, he was awarded the Silbernes Lorbeerblatt.

== Career ==
As a youth player he played for TV Lemgo, and transferred to TBV Lemgo in 1984. Here he made his debut in the Handball-Bundesliga in 1986 and played until 2006. In 556 league games he scored 1977 goals.

He is considered part of the Lemgo 'golden generation' together with Daniel Stephan, Christian Schwarzer, Florian Kehrmann and Stefan Kretzschmar, who won the European Championship together.

He has the second most appearances of any outfield player in the Bundesliga, has scored the 7th most all time goals and 3rd most non-penalty goals. He also has the Bundesliga record for most suspension minutes with 1018 total minutes.

When he retired in 2006 his shirt number was retired for three years until Holger Glandorf took it in 2009. The Heldmanskamphalle in Lemgo was renamed "Volker-Zerbe-Halle" in his honour.

He made a short return to handball, while he was the sporting director at Füchse Berlin, when he played for their B-team in the 2013–14 season.

== Post-playing career ==
After Zerbes playing days he has kept being involved in Handball. In 2007, he was a World Championship Ambassador leading up to the World Championship in Germany, and from the 2006–07 season he became the sporting director at TBV Lemko. He was the interim coach at TBV Lemgo from January 2007 until the end of the season after Volker Mudrow was fired, and once again from October 2007 until the end of the year, when Peter Meisinger was fired. He was released of his contract in 2012.

From 2013, he became the Sporting director at Füchse Berlin.

== Personal life ==
Zerbes nephew, Lukas Zerbe is also a professional handball player.
