= Christian Ramota =

German handball player (born 1973)

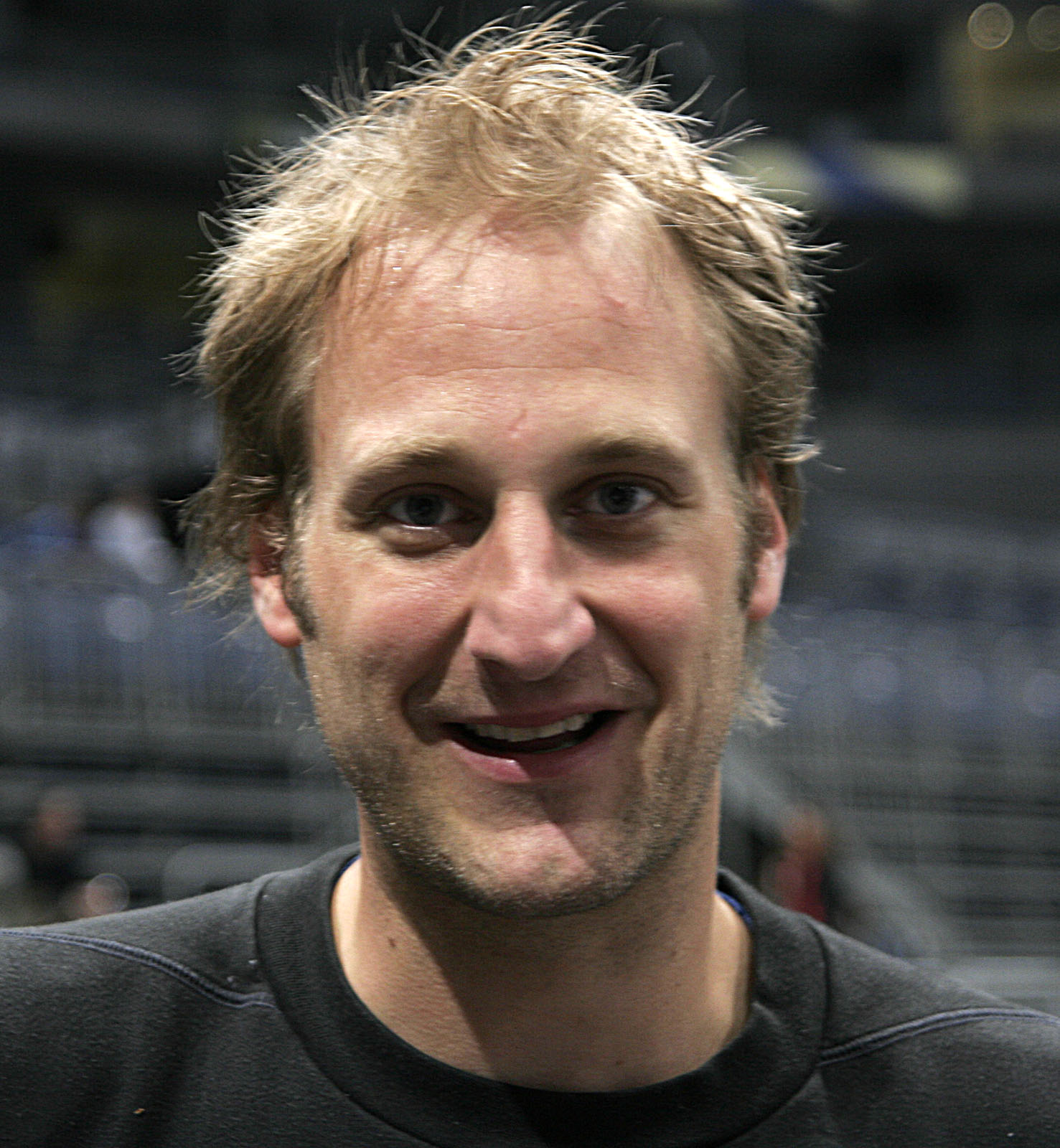
- Ramota in 2007

Personal information
- Born: 14 April 1973 (age 53) Cologne, Germany

Sport
- Sport: Handball
- Position: Goalkeeper

Senior clubs
- Years: Team
- 1988-1989: TuS Königsdorf
- 1989-1990: TSV Bayer Dormagen
- 1990-1991: Polizei Allianz Köln
- 1991-1998: VfL Gummersbach
- 1998-2001: TV Großwallstadt
- 2001-2005: TBV Lemgo
- 2005-2007: VfL Gummersbach
- 2008: HBW Balingen-Weilstetten
- 2010: TSV St. Otmar St. Gallen
National team
Years	Team	Apps	(Gls)
1993-	Germany	147	(0)
Medal record
Men's handball
Representing Germany
Olympic Games
Silver medal – second place	2004 Athens	Team Competition
World Championships
Silver medal – second place	2003 Portugal	Team competition
European Championships
Gold medal – first place	2004 Slovenia	Team competition
Silver medal – second place	2002 Sweden	Team competition

Christian Ramota (born 14 April 1973) is a former German team handball player (goalkeeper). He received a silver medal at the 2004 Summer Olympics in Athens with the German national team. He is also European champion from 2004, and received a silver medal at the 2003 World Championship.

In 2005 he was awarded the Silbernes Lorbeerblatt award.

== Career ==
Ramota started playing handball at 15, and joined VfL Gummersbach three years later. In his second season he broke into the first team. In November 1993 he debuted for the German national team against Switzerland.

In 2003 he won the German Championship with Lemgo. In total he played 456 Bundesliga matches.

In september 2010 he made a comeback to handball for four months when Swiss club TSV St. Otmar St. Gallen had their starting goalkeeper injured.

After his playing career he has worked in the catering business.
