= Andreas Cederholm =

Swedish handball player (born 1990)

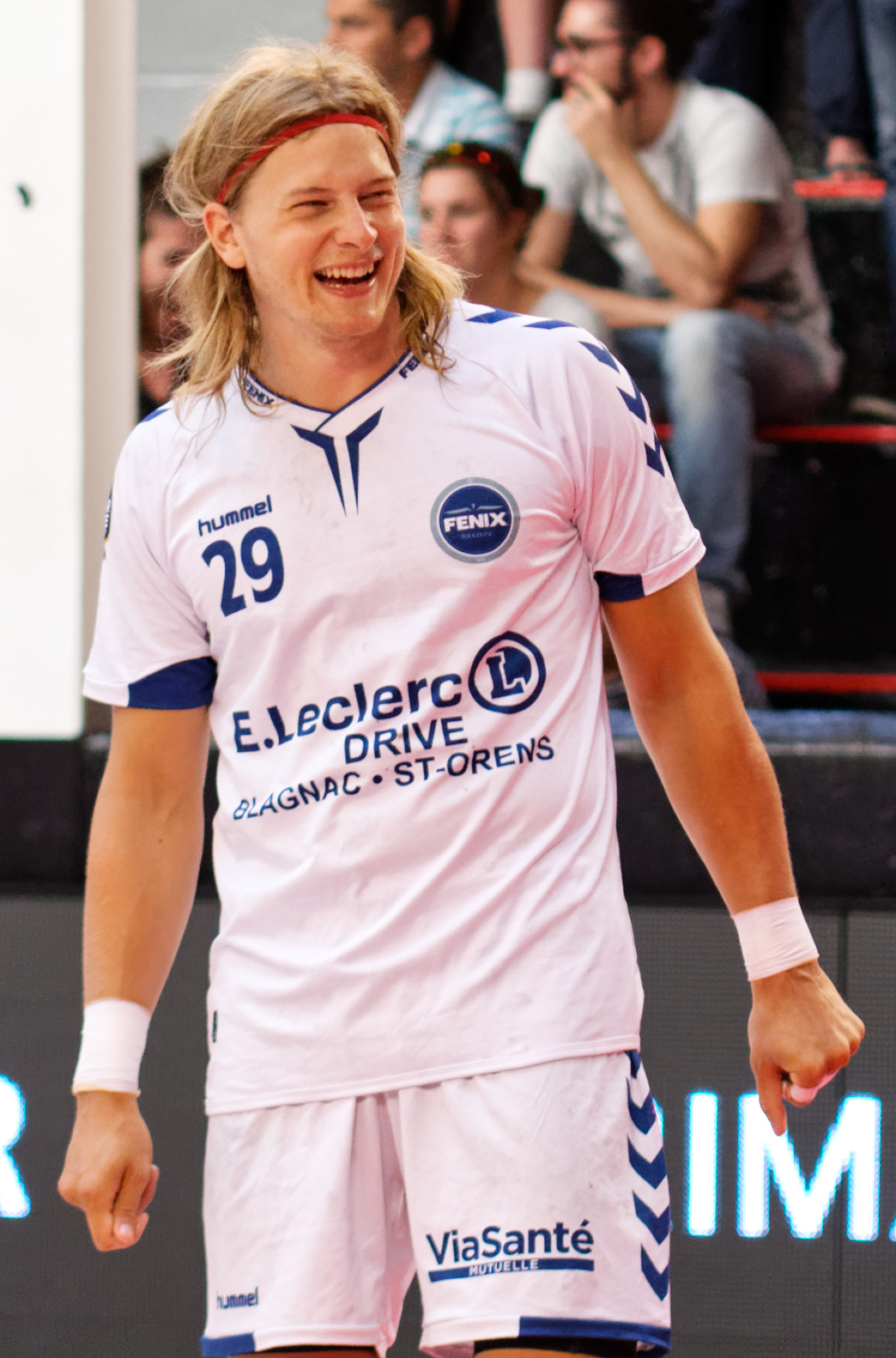
- Cederholm in 2017

Personal information
- Nationality: Swedish
- Born: 4 May 1990 (age 36) Hjo, Sweden
- Height: 1.86 m (6 ft 1 in)

Sport
- Sport: Handball
- Position: Right back
- Current club: IFK Kristianstad

Senior clubs
- Years: Team
- 2009–2013: IFK Skövde
- 2013–2016: IFK Kristianstad
- 2016–2017: Fenix Toulouse Handball
- 2017–2019: GWD Minden
- 2019–2022: TBV Lemgo
- 2022–: IFK Kristianstad
National team
Years	Team	Apps	(Gls)
2013–	Sweden	42	(66)
Medal record
European Championship
Silver medal – second place	2018 Croatia

Andreas Cederholm (born 4 May 1990) is a Swedish handball player for IFK Kristianstad and the Swedish national team.

He competed at the 2016 European Men's Handball Championship.
