= Florian Kehrmann =

German handball player (born 1977)

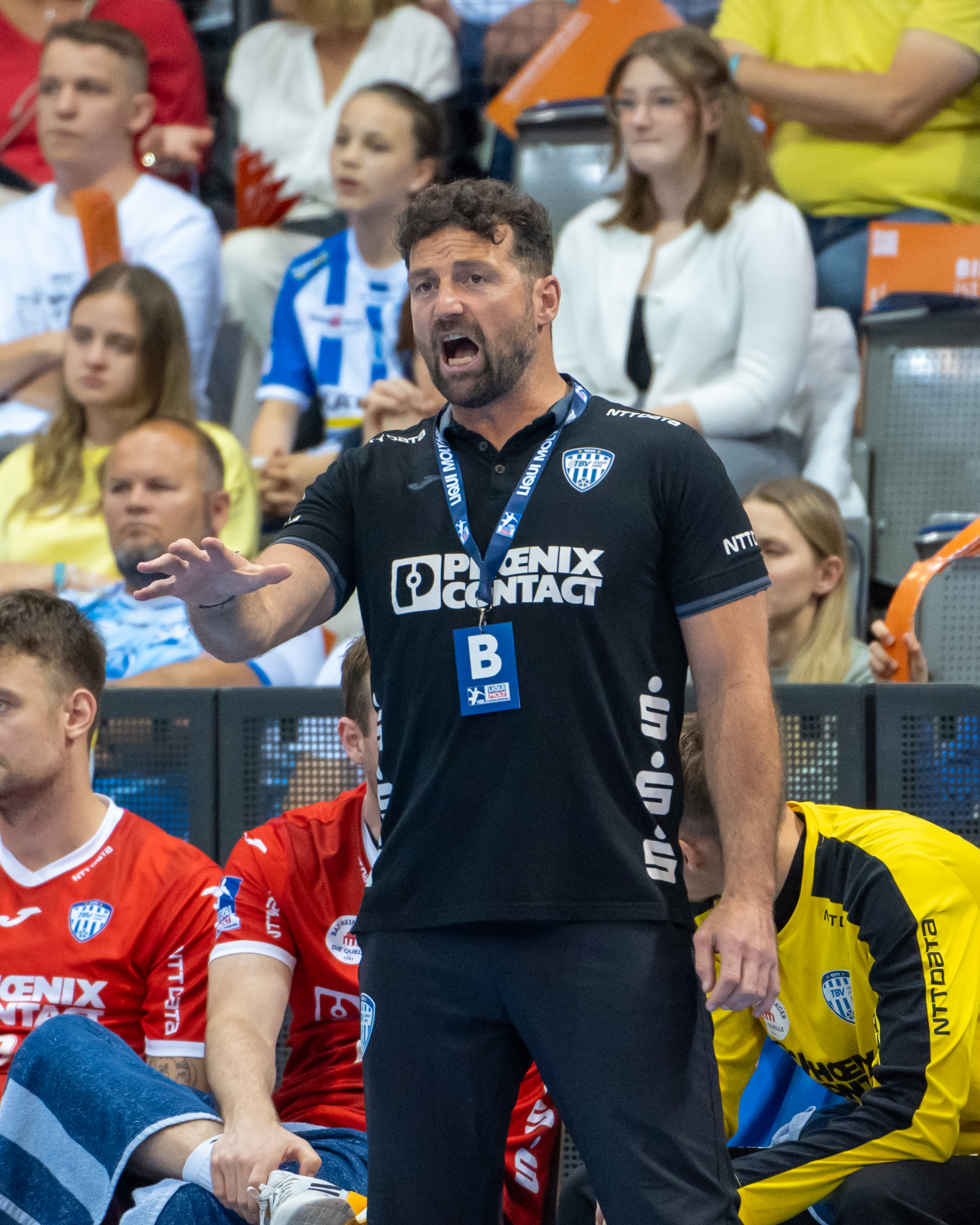
- Kehrmann in 2024

Personal information
- Full name: Florian Stefan Kehrmann
- Nationality: German
- Born: 26 June 1977 (age 49) Neuss, West Germany
- Height: 1.85 m (6 ft 1 in)

Sport
- Sport: Handball
- Position: Right wing
- Current club: TBV Lemgo (manager)

Senior clubs
- Years: Team
- 1994–1995: TUSEM Essen
- 1995–1999: Sportring Solingen
- 1999–2014: TBV Lemgo
National team
Years	Team	Apps	(Gls)
1997–2009	Germany	223	(820)

Teams managed
- 2014–: TBV Lemgo
Medal record
Olympic Games
Silver medal – second place	2004 Athens	Team
World Championship
Gold medal – first place	2007 Germany	Team
Silver medal – second place	2003 Portugal	Team
European Championship
Gold medal – first place	2004 Slovenia	Team
Silver medal – second place	2002 Sweden	Team

Florian Stefan Kehrmann (born 26 June 1977) is a German handball coach and former player who coaches TBV Lemgo.

== Club career ==
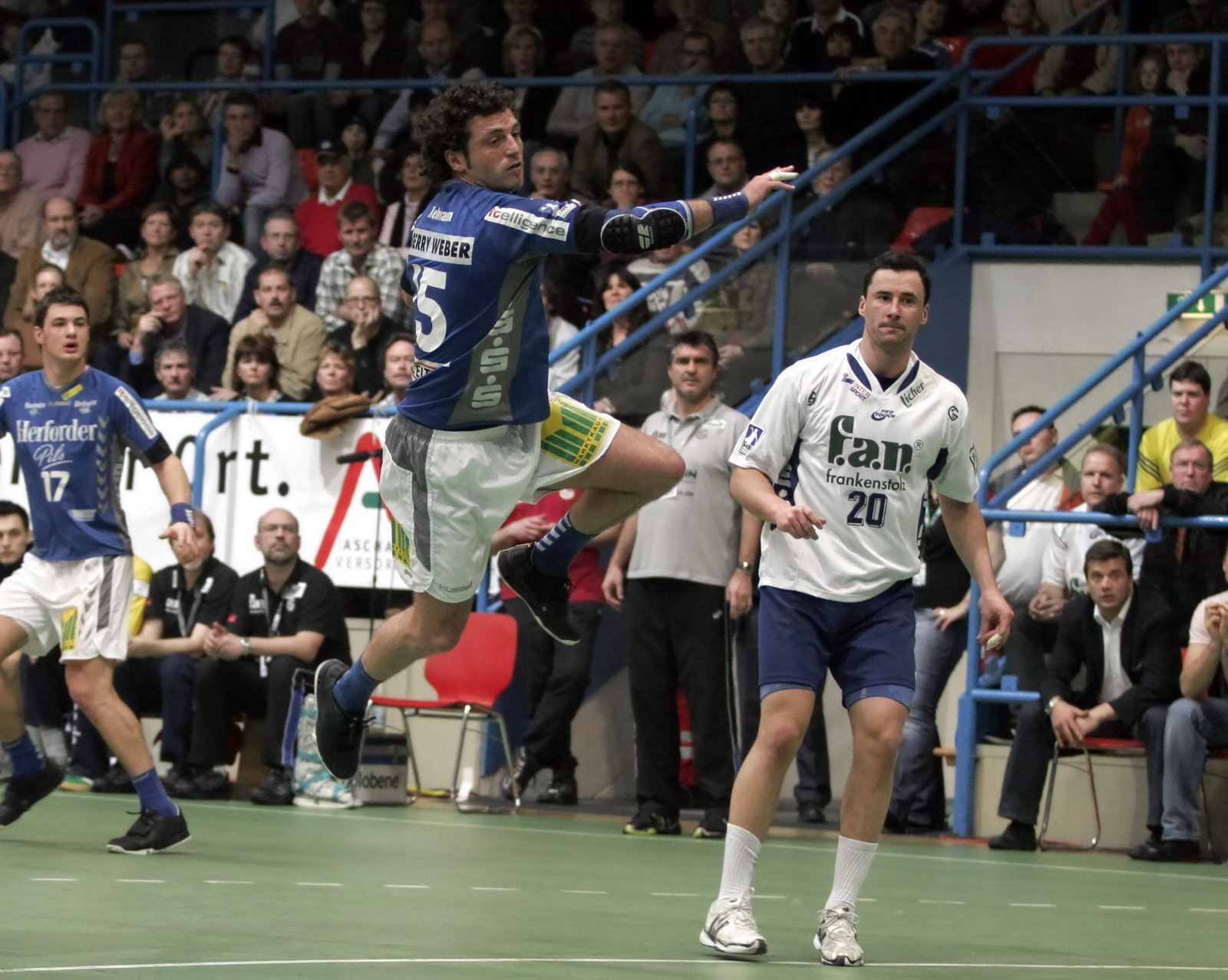
Kehrmann during a game, 2007

Kehrmann played for TUSEM Essen from 1994 until 1995 and for Sportring Solingen from 1995 until 1999. From 1999, he was part of TBV Lemgo, where he won the National Cup of Germany in 2002, the National Championship of Germany in 2003 and the EHF Cup in 2006. In 2014, he became the coach. He is considered part of the Lemgo 'golden generation' together with Daniel Stephan, Christian Schwarzer, Volker Zerbe and Stefan Kretzschmar, who won the European Championship together. In May 2014 he ended his plying career with 460 Bundesliga games and 1846 goals. He was the German handball player of the year in 2003, 2005 and 2006.

== International career ==
Kehrmann was a member of the German national handball team. He won the 2004 European Men's Handball Championship and the 2007 World Men's Handball Championship. For the latter he was awarded the Silbernes Lorbeerblatt.

He competed at the 2000, 2004, and 2008 Summer Olympics.

== Coaching career ==
From the 2011–12 season, while still playing, Kehrmann became a part of the Lemgo youth team setup. From the 2013–14 season he coached the „Lemgo Youngsters“ in the 3. Liga. On December 12th, 2014 he became the head coach at TBV Lemgo, replacing Niels Pfannenschmidt. When he took over the team was in second-to-last place, but he managed to avoid relegation in his first season. In the 2019–20 season, he won the DHB-Pokal with the team.

== Personal life ==
He married his wife Diana Wöstenfeld, who was also a handball player, in 2006. His first son Len Farell was born on 25 March 2007.

== Titles ==
=== As player ===
- World Championship:
  - Winner: 2007
  - Silver: 2003
- Olympics
  - Silver: 2004 Olympics
- European Championship
  - Silver: 2002
- EHF European League
  - Winner: 2006, 2010
- German Champion
  - Winner: 2002
- German Cup
  - Winner: 2003
- German Youth Championship
  - Winner: 1994

=== As Coach ===
- German Cup
  - Winner: 2020
