= Mika Baur =

German footballer (born 2004)

Personal information
- Full name: Mika Joel Baur
- Date of birth: 9 July 2004 (age 22)
- Place of birth: Salem, Baden-Württemberg, Germany
- Height: 1.72 m (5 ft 8 in)
- Position: Midfielder

Team information
- Current team: Celtic
- Number: 22

Youth career
- –2022: SC Freiburg

Senior career*
Years	Team	Apps	(Gls)
2022–2024	SC Freiburg II	61	(5)
2024	SC Paderborn II	2	(2)
2024–2026	SC Paderborn	39	(4)
2025	→ Dynamo Dresden (loan)	18	(1)
2026–	Celtic	11	(1)

International career^{‡}
2021–2022	Germany U18	7	(1)
2022–2023	Germany U19	7	(2)
2023–2025	Germany U20	7	(3)
2026–	Germany U21	1	(0)
2026–	Germany	2	(0)
- * Club domestic league appearances and goals as of 8 November 2026 ‡ National team caps and goals as of 23:45, 4 October 2026 (UTC)

Mika Joel Baur (born 9 July 2004) is a German professional footballer who plays as a midfielder for Scottish Premiership club Celtic and the Germany national team.

== Club career ==
=== SC Paderborn ===
On 13 June 2024, Baur signed with 2. Bundesliga club SC Paderborn. Over two seasons with the club, he 44 appearances and scored four goals.

==== Loan to Dynamo Dresden ====
On 17 January 2025, Baur was loaned to 3. Liga side Dynamo Dresden until the end of the 2024–25 season, scoring one goal across 18 appearances.

=== Celtic ===
On 13 August 2026, Baur signed a four-year contract with Scottish Premiership club Celtic for an undisclosed fee. Baur made his debut on 15 August 2026, appearing as a substitute in a 4–0 win over Dundee United in the Scottish League Cup.

== International career ==
Baur is a German youth international, having represented the U18, U19, U20 and U21 teams.

In September 2026, he was one of players who were called up with the Germany national team by head coach Jürgen Klopp for the 2026–27 UEFA Nations League matches against Netherlands, Greece, Serbia and Greece between 24 September and 4 October 2026.

== Personal life ==
Baur was born in Germany to German and Malagasy roots. Baur is the son of the German handball player Markus Baur.

== Career statistics ==
=== Club ===
As of 8 November 2026

Appearances and goals by club, season and competition
Club	Season	League			National cup (Note: Includes DFB-Pokal, Scottish Cup)		League cup (Note: Includes Scottish League Cup)		Europe		Other		Total	
Club	Season	Division	Apps	Goals	Apps	Goals	Apps	Goals	Apps	Goals	Apps	Goals	Apps	Goals
SC Freiburg II	2021–22	3. Liga	10	1	–		–		–		–		10	1
SC Freiburg II	2022–23	3. Liga	21	3	–		–		–		–		21	3
SC Freiburg II	2023–24	3. Liga	30	1	–		–		–		–		30	1
SC Freiburg II	Total		61	5	–		–		–		–		61	5
SC Paderborn II	2024–25	Regionalliga West	2	2	–		–		–		–		2	2
SC Paderborn	2024–25	2. Bundesliga	6	0	2	0	–		–		–		8	0
SC Paderborn	2025–26	2. Bundesliga	33	4	2	0	–		–		1 (Note: Appearance in 2.Bundesliga promotion play-offs)	0	36	4
SC Paderborn	Total		39	4	4	0	–		—		1	0	44	4
Dynamo Dresden (loan)	2024–25	3. Liga	18	1	–		–		–		–		18	1
Celtic	2026–27	Scottish Premiership	11	1	0	0	2	0	6 (Note: Two appearances in UEFA Champions League, four appearances and two goals in UEFA Europa League)	2	–		19	3
Career total			131	13	4	0	2	0	6	2	1	0	144	15

=== International ===
As of match played 4 October 2026

Appearances and goals by national team and year
National team	Year	Apps	Goals
Germany	2026	2	0
Total		2	0
