= Sebastian Preiß =

German handball player (born 1981)

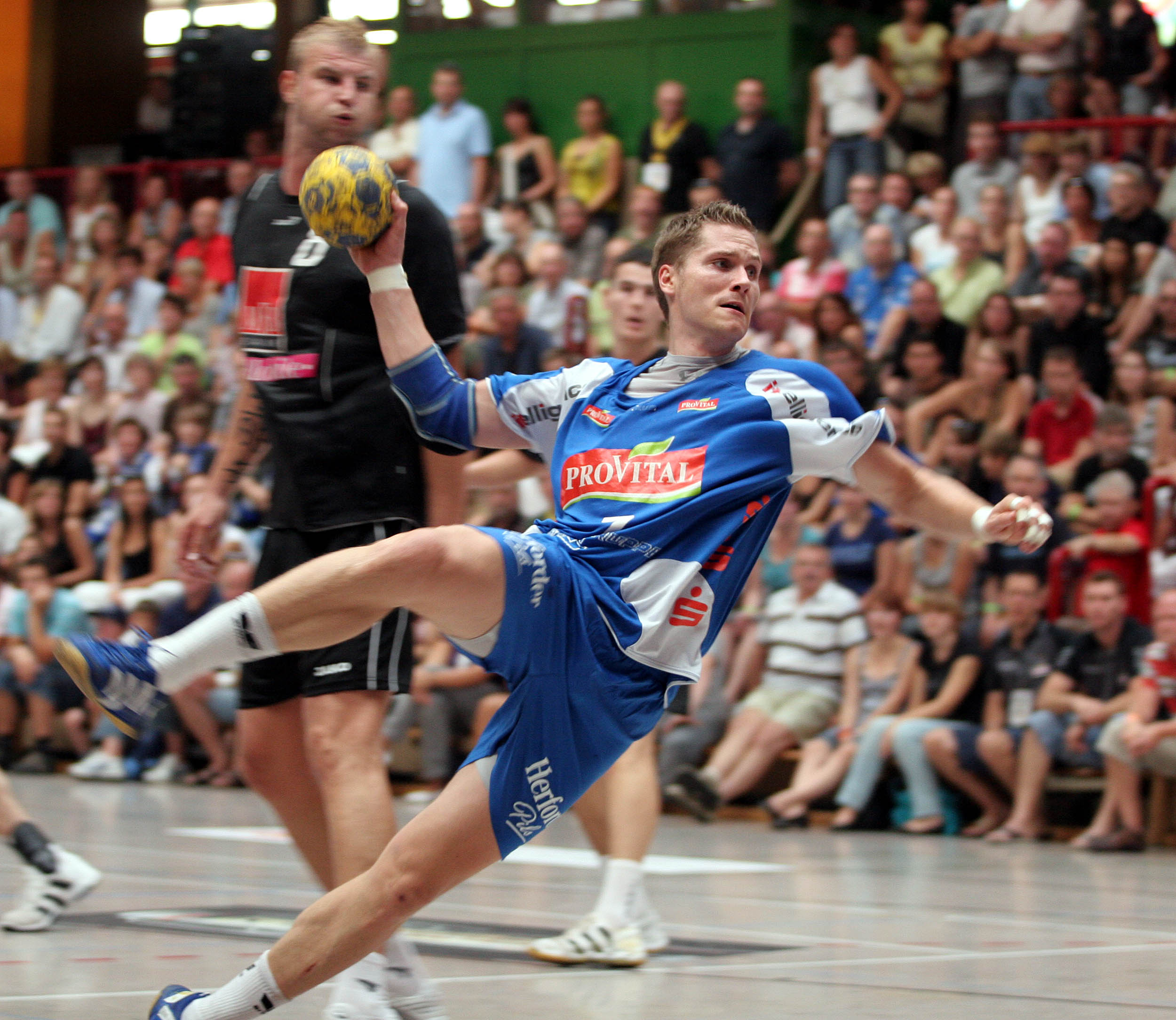
- Preiß in 2008

Personal information
- Nationality: German
- Born: 8 February 1981 (age 45) Ansbach, Bavaria, West Germany
- Height: 1.95 m (6 ft) (2005)
- Weight: 100 kg (220 lb) (2005)

Sport
- Sport: Handball
- Position: Pivot

Youth career
- Years: Team
- –: TSV Stein
- –: HG Quelle Fürth
- –: TSV Zirndorf

Senior clubs
- Years: Team
- 1997–2001: HG Erlangen
- 2001–2005: THW Kiel
- 2005–2013: TBV Lemgo
- 2013-2016: HC Erlangen
- 2016-2017: HF Springe
National team
Years	Team	Apps	(Gls)
2002-	Germany	145	(362)
Medal record
Men's Handball
World championship
Gold medal – first place	2007 Germany	Team Competition

Sebastian Preiß (born 8 February 1981) is a German retired handball player in the German national team. In 2007 he won the World Championship with the German national team.

== Club career ==
Preiß began his Handball-Bundesliga career at THW Kiel, where he won the German Championship twice and the EHF European League twice. From 2005 to 2013 he played for TBV Lemgo, where he once again won the EHF European League twice. In 2013 he joined second Bundesliga team HC Erlangen, Here he was promoted to the Bundesliga in his first season, but relegated again in his second, only to be promoted for a second time in 2015-16.

He then joined HF Springe in the third tier.

== International career ==
Preiß debuted for the German national team on 4 January 2002 against Switzerland. He won the 2007 World Men's Handball Championship with the German team, for which he was awarded the Silbernen Lorbeerblatt.

== Titles ==
- 2007 World Champion
- EHF European League: 2002, 2004, 2006, 2010
- German Champion: 2002, 2005
