= Bobby Schagen =

Dutch handball player (born 1990)

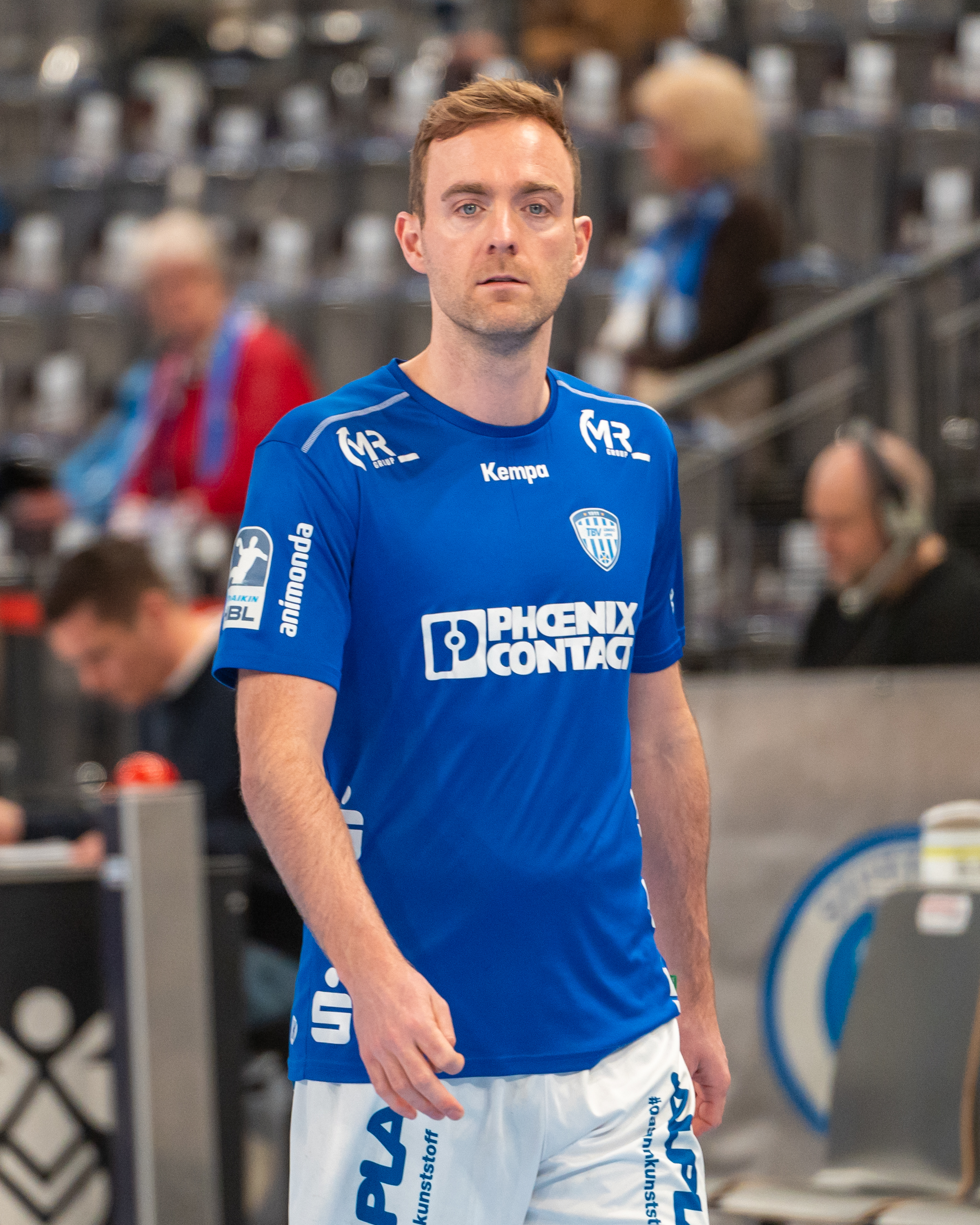

Personal information
- Nationality: Dutch
- Born: 13 January 1990 (age 36) Amsterdam, Netherlands
- Height: 1.92 m (6 ft 4 in)

Sport
- Sport: Handball
- Position: Right wing
- Current club: TBV Lemgo
- Number: 14

Senior clubs
- Years: Team
- –2006: HV Aristos Amsterdam
- 2006–2009: RKHV Volendam
- 2009–2010: TSV Dormagen
- 2010–2015: HSG Nordhorn-Lingen
- 2015–2016: TuS Nettelstedt-Lübbecke
- 2016–2019: TVB 1898 Stuttgart
- 2019–: TBV Lemgo
National team
| Years | Team | Apps | (Gls) |
| 2009- | Netherlands | 148 | (450) |
- Updated on 15 January 2026

Bobby Schagen (born 13 January 1990) is a Dutch handball player for TBV Lemgo and the Dutch national team.

He represented the Netherlands at the 2020 European Men's Handball Championship.
