= Sparkasse Arena =

Ice hockey arena in Bolzano, Italy

- PalaOnda (Italian) – Eiswelle (German)
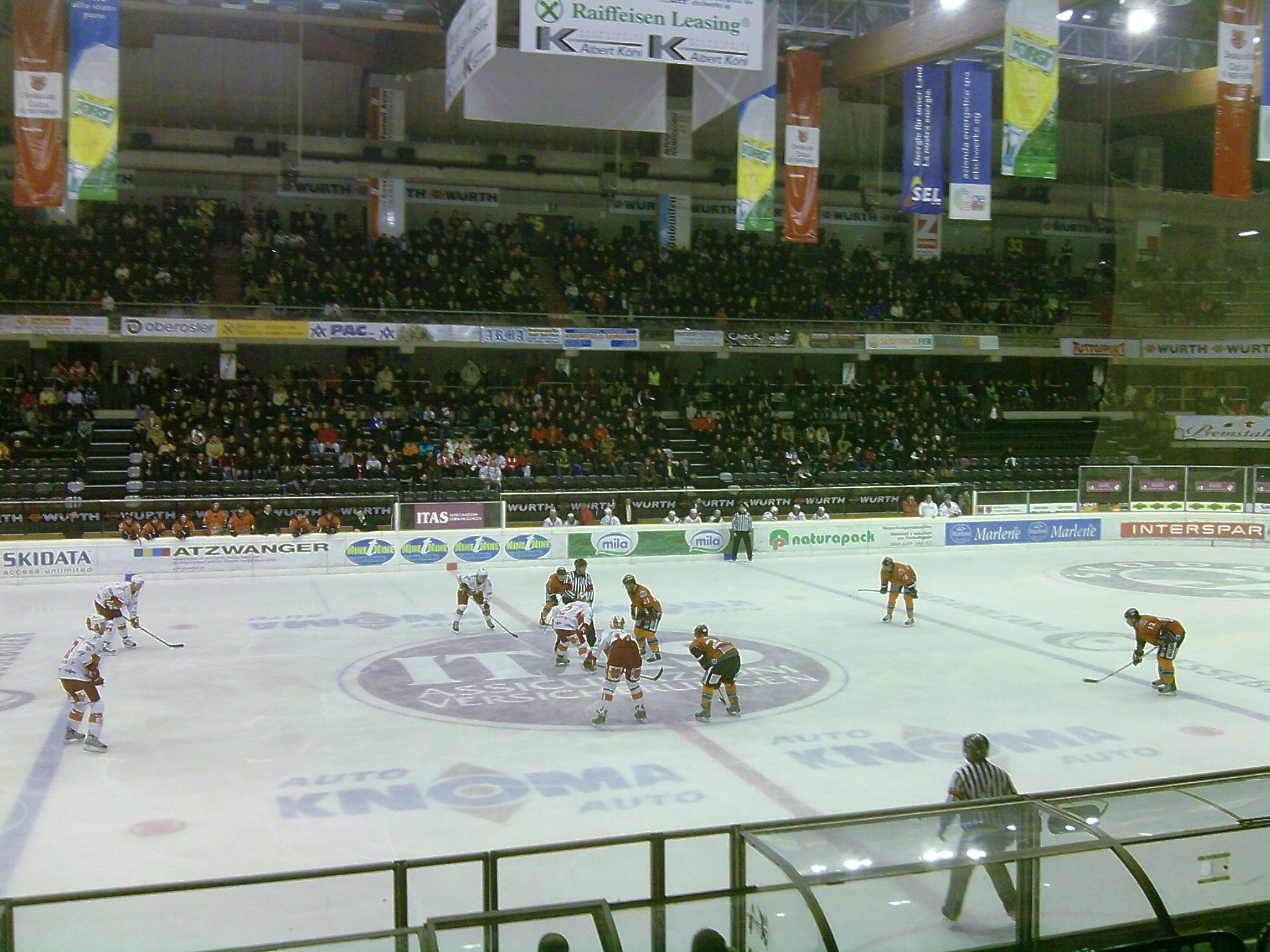
- A 2009–10 IIHF Continental Cup game between HC Bolzano and Sheffield Steelers in November 2009
- Interactive map of Sparkasse Arena
- Location: Galvani-Straße 4, Bolzano
- Coordinates: 46.471695°N 11.329372°E
- Owner: SEAB AG
- Capacity: 7,200 (Ice hockey)

Construction
- Opened: 1993

Tenants
- HC Bolzano (ICEHL); EVB Eagles Südtirol (EWHL)

Website
- Official website

The Sparkasse Arena, formerly called PalaOnda or Eiswelle, is an indoor sports arena in Bolzano, Italy. It was built to host the 1994 Men's World Ice Hockey Championships along with Forum di Assago and has a capacity of 7,200. It is the home arena of several ice hockey teams, including HC Bolzano of the ICE Hockey League and the EVB Eagles Südtirol of the European Women's Hockey League (EWHL).

The arena also hosted the 1998 European Handball Championships and the 2010–11 CEV Champions League final four.

== See also ==
- List of indoor arenas in Italy

Events and tenants
Preceded by Palacio San Pablo (Spain) Seville	European Men's Handball Championship; Final Venue; 1998	Succeeded by Dom Sportova (Croatia) Zagreb
Preceded by Atlas Arena (Poland) Łódź	CEV Champions League; Final Venue; 2011	Succeeded by Atlas Arena (Poland) Łódź
