= Carsten Lichtlein =

German handball player (born 1980)

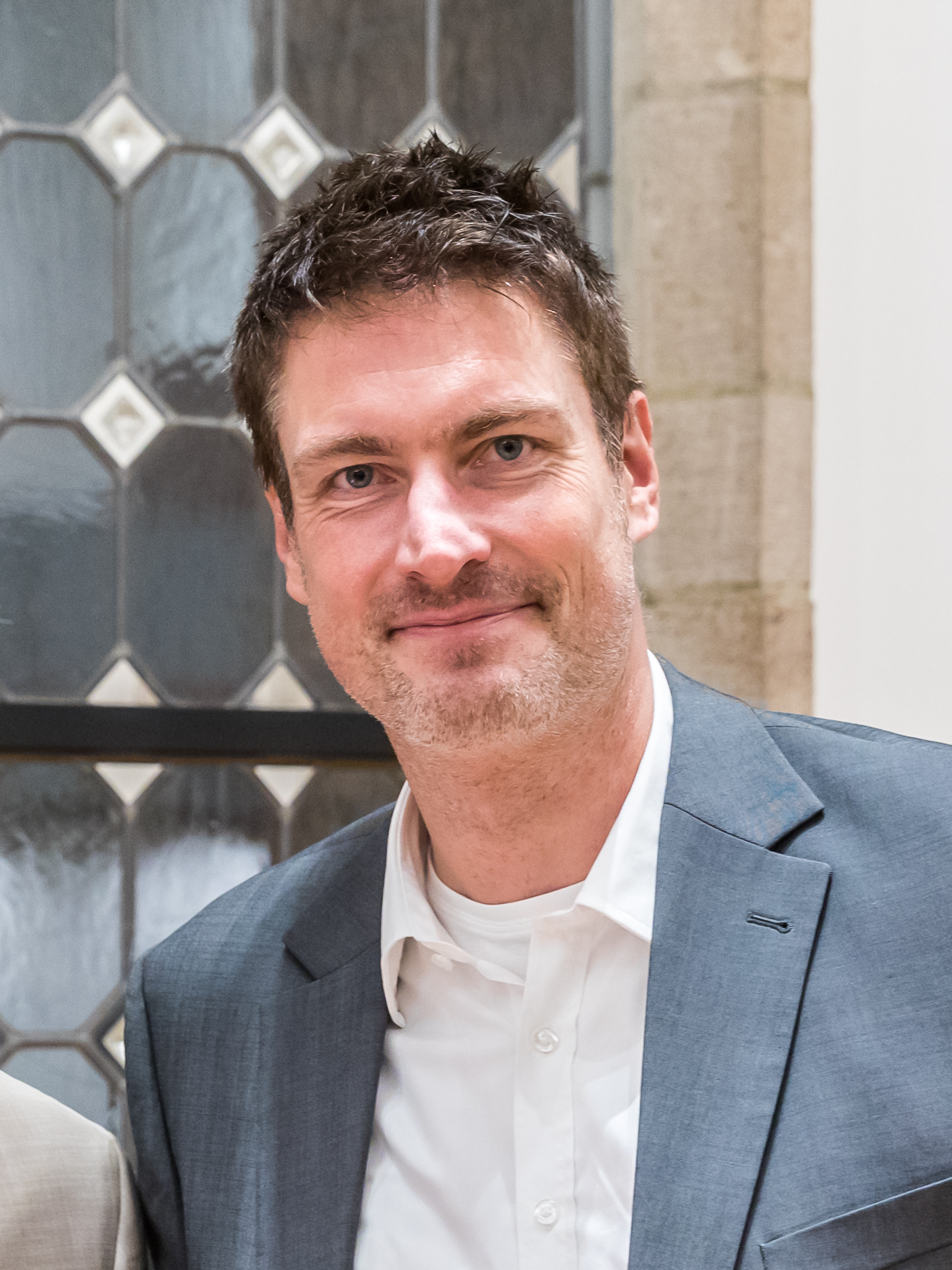

Personal information
- Nationality: German
- Born: 4 November 1980 (age 45) Würzburg, West Germany
- Height: 2.02

Sport
- Sport: Handball
- Position: Goalkeeper

Senior clubs
- Years: Team
- –: TG Heidingsfeld
- –2000: TV Kirchzell
- 2000–2005: TV Großwallstadt
- 2005–2013: TBV Lemgo
- 2013–2019: VfL Gummersbach
- 2019–2020: HC Erlangen
- 2020–2022: GWD Minden
National team
Years	Team	Apps	(Gls)
2001–2016	Germany	220	(1)
Medal record
World Championship
Gold medal – first place	2007 Germany
Silver medal – second place	2003 Portugal
European Championship
Gold medal – first place	2004 Slovenia
Gold medal – first place	2016 Poland

Carsten Lichtlein (born 4 November 1980) is a former German handball player and goalkeeper. He is a World champion from 2007 with the German national team, a European champion from 2004 and from 2016 and participated on the German team that finished 4th at the 2008 European Men's Handball Championship.

== Club player ==
Lichtlein won the EHF Cup in 2006 with TBV Lemgo.

== Private life ==
His nephew, Nils Lichtlein, is also a handball player for the German national team.

== Achievements ==
- European Championship:
  - Gold: 2016
