= Andreas Larsson (handballer) =

Swedish handball player (born 1974)

Personal information
- Full name: Peter Andreas Larsson
- Nationality: Swedish
- Born: 13 August 1974 (age 52) Stöpen, Skövde, Sweden
- Height: 1.92 m (6 ft 4 in)

Sport
- Sport: Handball
- Position: Right back
- Current club: Retired

Youth career
- Years: Team
- -1990: HK Country
- 1990-: IFK Skövde

Senior clubs
- Years: Team
- -1996: IFK Skövde
- 1996-1997: TuS Schutterwald
- 1997-1999: TBV Lemgo
- 1999-2004: HSG Nordhorn
- 2004: HK Country
- 2004: IFK Skövde
National team
Years	Team	Apps	(Gls)
1993-2003	Sweden	126	(300)
Medal record
Olympic Games
Silver medal – second place	1996 Atlanta	Team
Silver medal – second place	2000 Sydney	Team
European Championship
Gold medal – first place	1998 Italy
Gold medal – first place	2000 Croatia
Gold medal – first place	2002 Sweden
World Championship
Silver medal – second place	1997 Japan

Peter Andreas Larsson (born 13 August 1974) is a Swedish handball player who won European Championship three times in a row and won silver medals at the 1996 Summer Olympics and in the 2000 Summer Olympics.

== Career ==
Larsson started playing handball at HK Country, where he also practiced motocross. At the age of 16 he joined IFK Skövde where he played handball, while he practiced Motocross in Tibro. When he was promoted to the IFK Skövde first team he decided to focus fully on handball. He played for IFK Skövde until 1996, reaching 107 matches and 500 goals for the club.

He then moved to Germany to become professional. First to TuS Schutterwald, then to TBV Lemgo for two seasons. With Lemgo he won the 1997 German Supercup. In the 1997-98 EHF Champions League he reached the semifinal, where Lemgo lost to FC Barcelona. In 1999 he moved to HSG Nordhorn, where he played until 2004.

In 2004 he returned to his childhood club HK Country, where he retired. In 2006 he made a comeback for IFK Skövde, until an infection in the knee prevented him from playing.

His shirt number (#13) is retired at IFK Skövde.

=== National team ===
Larsson debuted for the Swedish national team on June 10th 1993 against Kirgizistan. He won the European Championship three times in a row from 1998 to 2002, and participated in two Olympic games, winning silver medals both times.

In 1996 he was a member of the Swedish handball team won the silver medal in the Olympic tournament. He played two matches and scored six goals.

Four years later he was part of the Swedish team which won the silver medal again. He played seven matches and scored 17 goals.
