= Mike Bezdicek =

German handball player (born 1968)

Personal information
- Nationality: German
- Born: 28 June 1968 (age 58) Freiberg, East Germany
- Height: 206 cm (81 in)

Sport
- Sport: Handball
- Position: Pivot

Youth career
- Years: Team
- 1983–1986: KJS Leipzig
- 1986–1987: TuS Hofweier

Senior clubs
- Years: Team
- 1987–1989: TuS Hofweier
- 1989–1994: TBV Lemgo
- 1994–1995: VfL Hameln
- 1995–1998: TBV Lemgo
- 1998–1999: VfL Bad Schwartau
- 1999–2000: GWD Minden
- 2000–2001: THW Kiel
- 2001–2001: (Italy) Pallamano Rubiera
- 2001–2004: GWD Minden
- 2004–2005: TBV Lemgo
- 2005–2006: (Spain) BM Ciudad de Almería
- 2006: LTV Wuppertal
- 2006–2007: Ahlener SG
- 2007–2009: MMTV Obernkirchen
National team
Years	Team	Apps	(Gls)
1990–2000	Germany	86	(98)

Teams managed
- 2008–2013: TSG Harsewinkel
- 2013–2014: MTV Rohrsen
- 2014–2015: MTV Obernkirchen
- 2015–2016: Handball Bad Salzuflen
- 2017–2019: HSG Fuhlen/Hessisch Oldendorf

Mike Bezdicek (born 28 June 1968) is a German handball player, who played as a pivot.

== Career ==
As a youth player Bezdicek played for KJS Leipzig, before joining the Bundesliga team TuS Hofweier, where he made his senior debut. He then played for TBV Lemgo and VfL Hameln. With Lemgo he won the EHF Cup Winners' Cup, DHB-Pokal and the German Championship.

He then played for THW Kiel and GWD Minden as well as Italian Pallamano Rubiera and Spanish BM Ciudad de Almería.

In 2021 he was accused of using anabolic steroids while playing for Pallamano Rubiera.

After his playing career, he has been a coach at various lower league German teams.

=== National team ===
Bezdicek played 86 matches for the German national team, scoring 98 goals. He competed in the men's tournament at the 2000 Summer Olympics, where Germany reached the quarter finals, where they lost to Spain.
