= Gedeón Guardiola =

Spanish handball player (born 1984)

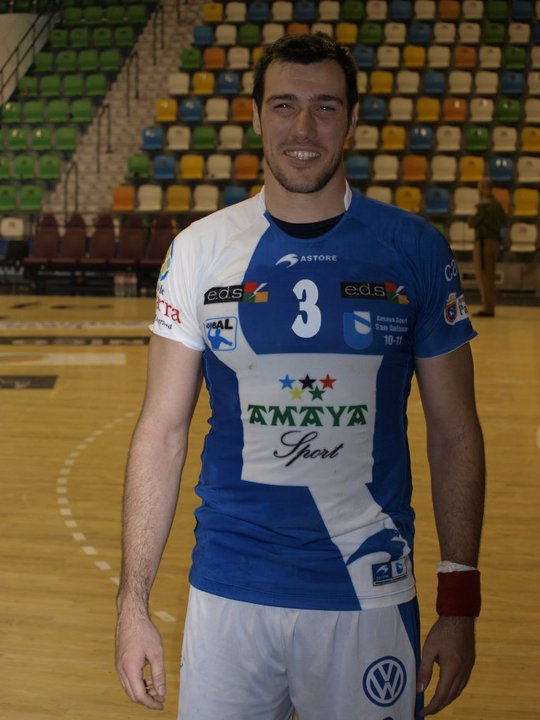

Personal information
- Full name: Gedeón Guardiola Villaplana
- Born: 1 October 1984 (age 42) Petrer, Spain
- Height: 2.00 m (6 ft 7 in)

Sport
- Sport: Handball
- Position: Pivot
- Current club: Club Balonmano Nava

Senior clubs
- Years: Team
- 1996–2001: Petrer
- 2001–2005: Valencia
- 2005–2008: Teucro
- 2008–2009: Ciudad Logroño
- 2009–2014: San Antonio
- 2014–2020: Rhein-Neckar Löwen
- 2020–2023: TBV Lemgo
- 2023–2024: HC Erlangen
- 2024-: Club Balonmano Nava
National team
Years	Team	Apps	(Gls)
2011-	Spain	203	(238)
Medal record
Olympic Games
Bronze medal – third place	2020 Tokyo	Team
World Championship
Gold medal – first place	2013 Spain
Bronze medal – third place	2021 Egypt
Bronze medal – third place	2023 Poland/Sweden
European Championship
Gold medal – first place	2018 Croatia
Gold medal – first place	2020 Sweden/Austria/Norway
Silver medal – second place	2016 Poland
Silver medal – second place	2022 Hungary/Slovakia
Bronze medal – third place	2014 Denmark
- Updated on 25 June 2024

Gedeón Guardiola Villaplana (born 1 October 1984) is a Spanish handballer for Club Balonmano Nava and the Spain national team. He was on the Spanish team that won the 2013 World Championship.

He is a twin brother of Isaías Guardiola, also a handballer.

== Career ==
Gedeón Guardiola started playing handball at his home town club BM Petrer. From 2001 to 2005 he played for Valencia, where he made his senior debut in the 2002–03 season. In 2005 he joined SD Teucro. In 2008-09 he played a single season for Ciudad Logroño, before joining SDC San Antonio. In total he played 208 games in Liga ASOBAL, scoring 437 goals.

In 2012 he moved to German team Rhein-Neckar Löwen, where he played together with this twin brother, Isaías Guardiola. Here he won the 2012-13 EHF Cup. In October 2014 he extended his contract until 2018. In 2020 he joined league rivals TBV Lemgo. He won the German Championship back-to-back in 2016 and 2017 and the DHB-Supercup three times in a row from 2016 to 2018 with 'die Löwen'. When his contract was not extended in 2023, he left for HC Erlangen. In February 2024 he left Erlangen, as he wanted to return to Spain. He then joined Club Balonmano Nava on a deal until the end of the season 2025.

In total he played 336 Bundesliga games, scoring 465 goals.

=== National team ===
Guardiola debuted for the Spanish youth national team on 27 March 2002. He played five matches for the team. He later played 29 games for the U-21 team.

He debuted for the Senior team on November 3, 2011, in the Supercup. His first major international tournament was the 2012 European Championship. Later the same year he played at the 2012 Olympics. He became a world champion at the 2013 World Championship. At the 2014 European Championship he won bronze medals.

He also participated in the 2015 World Championship.

At the 2018 and 2020 European Championships he won back-to-back gold medals with the Spanish team.

At the 2020 Olympics in Tokyo he won bronze medals.

At the 2022 European Championship he won silver medals, playing all ninegames and scoring 5 goals. A year later at the 2023 World Championship on home soil he won bronze medals.

He missed the 2024 Olympics as he was injured a week before the games, during Spain's preparations.
