= Markus Baur =

German handball player (born 1971)

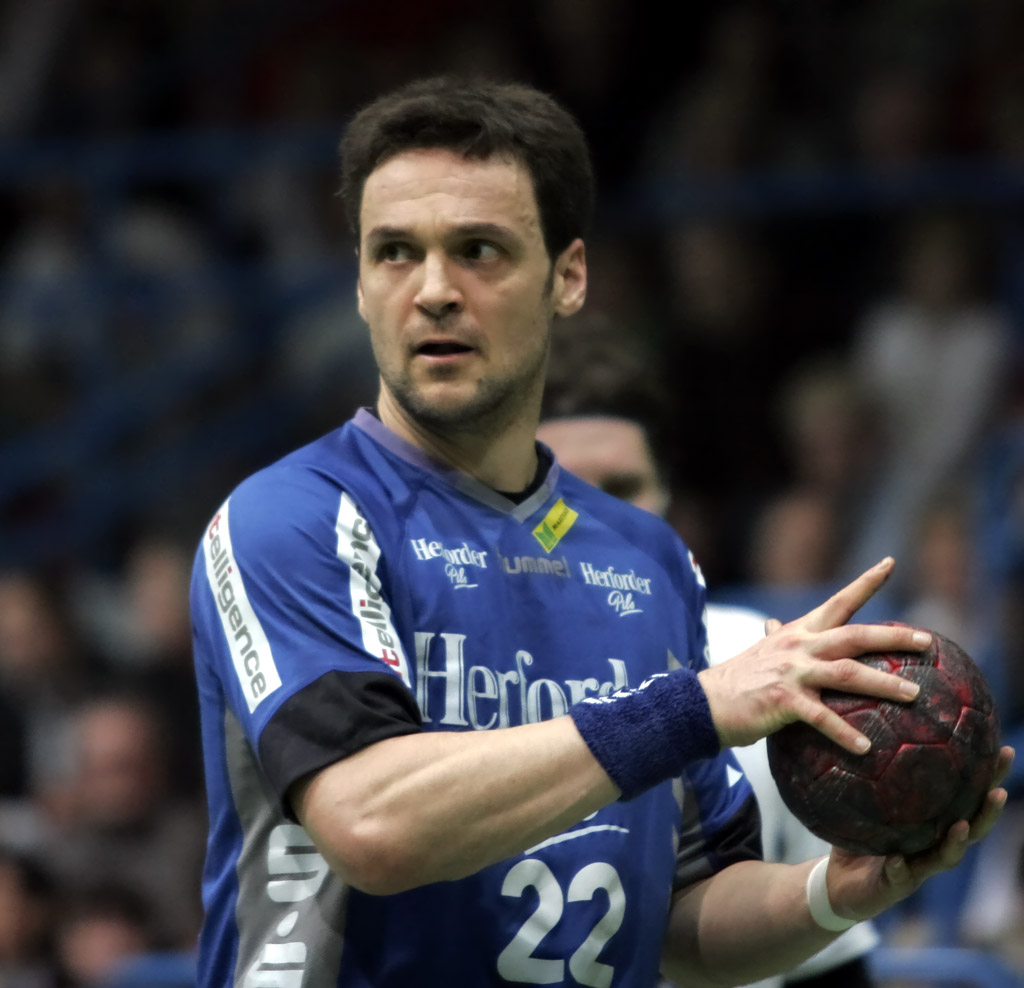
- Baur in 2007

Personal information
- Born: 22 January 1971 (age 55) Meersburg, West Germany
- Height: 190 cm (75 in)

Sport
- Sport: Handball
- Position: Centre back

Senior clubs
- Years: Team
- –: TSV Mimmenhausen
- 1993: VfL Pfullingen
- 1993–1997: SG Wallau-Massenheim
- 1997–1998: TV Niederwürzbach
- 1998–2001: HSG Wetzlar
- 2001–2007: TBV Lemgo
- 2007: Pfadi Winterthur (player-coach)
National team
Years	Team	Apps	(Gls)
1994–2008	Germany	228	(712)

Teams managed
- 2008–2009: TBV Lemgo
- 2009–2010: TuS Nettelstedt-Lübbecke
- 2013–2015: Kadetten Schaffhausen
- 2016–2018: TVB 1898 Stuttgart
- 2022–: Frisch Auf Göppingen
Medal record
Olympic Games
Silver medal – second place	2004 Athens	Team
World Championship
Gold medal – first place	2007 Germany	Team
Silver medal – second place	2003 Portugal	Team
European Championship
Gold medal – first place	2004 Slovenia	Team
Silver medal – second place	2002 Sweden	Team

Markus Baur (born 22 January 1971) is a German handball coach and former player.

Born in Meersburg, he is a member of the Germany national team since 1994, making his debut against Morocco on 4 August in Balingen. The German handball player of the years 2000 and 2002, he won the 2004 European Men's Handball Championship and the 2007 World Men's Handball Championship. As of January 2007, he has made 200 international matches with 615 goals.

In the Bundesliga Baur played for SG Wallau-Massenheim from 1993 to 1997, between 1997 and 1998 for TV Niederwürzbach and from 1998 to 2001 for HSG Wetzlar. Since 2001, he plays for TBV Lemgo, winning the National Championship of Germany with his team in 2003 and the EHF Cup in 2006. In 1994 and 2002, he has also won the DHB-Pokal.

== Personal life ==
Baur is married and has three children; daughter Chiara who plays handball, and two sons who play football named Mika and Kimi.
