= Jesper Larsson =

Swedish handball player (born 1973)

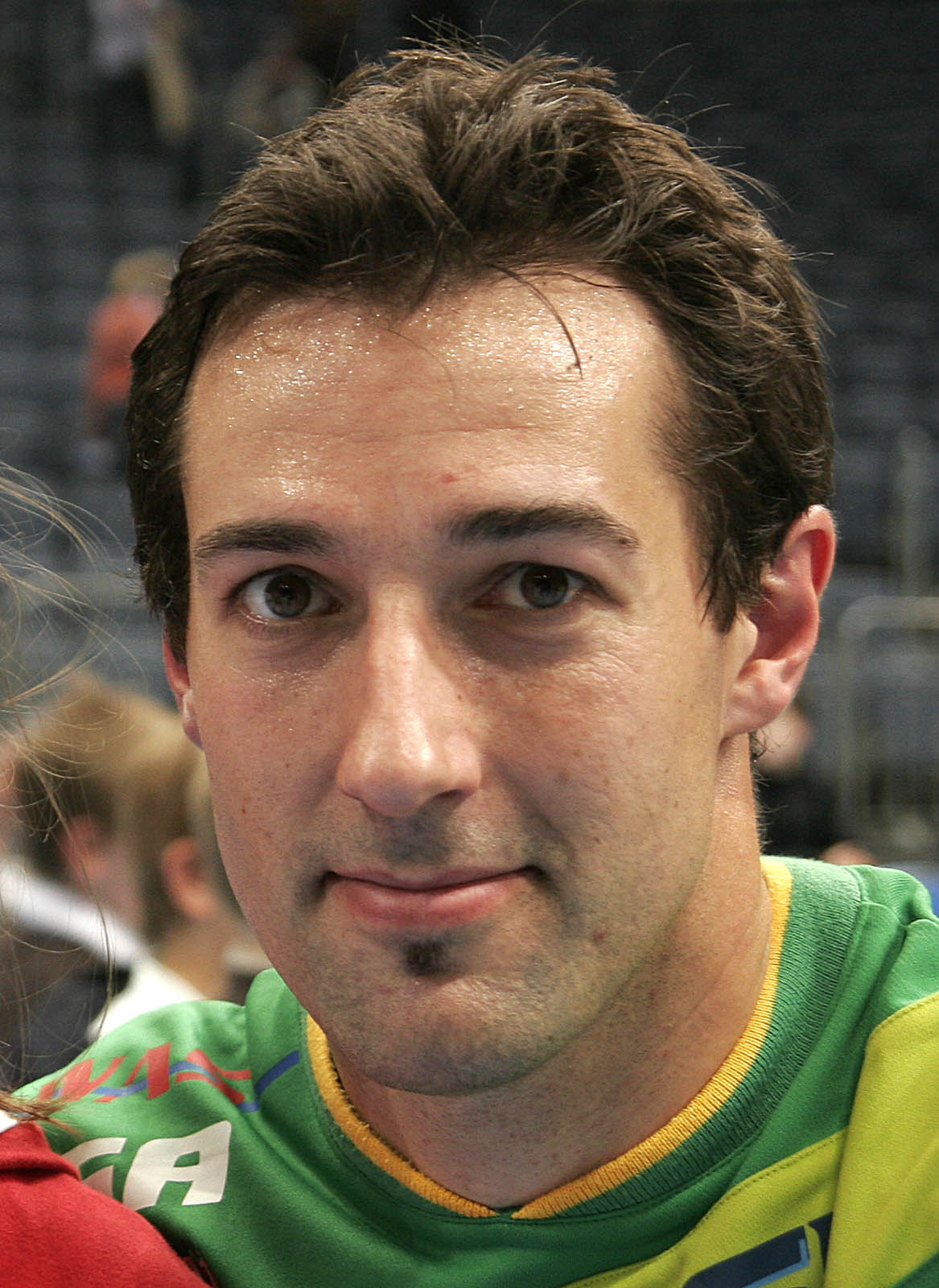
Jesper Larsson

Jesper Larsson (pronounced [ˈjɛ̌sːpɛ ˈɭɑ̌ːʂɔn]; (Note: In isolation, these words are pronounced [ˈjɛ̌sːpɛr] and [ˈlɑ̌ːʂɔn], respectively.) born 27 July 1973) is a Swedish former handball player, who played as a goalkeeper. He made his debut for IFK Kristianstad in 1991–92, helping the team to reach promotion to Elitserien in the same season. He played three more seasons for the club before joining league rivals HK Drott. In 1997, Larsson signed for German second division club HSG Nordhorn. In 1999 he helped the team to promotion to the Handball-Bundesliga. After finishing second in the league with Nordhorn in 2001–02, he joined league rivals TUSEM Essen. After two seasons he returned to Nordhorn, where he played until 2007. Larsson returned to Sweden for the 2007–08 season, playing for H 43 Lund. Two years later, he returned to Kristianstad. In his final professional season in 2011–12, he helped Kristianstad reach the Swedish Championship final, where they were defeated by IK Sävehof. He also played 19 matches for Sweden, but was never selected for a major championship. He was assistant coach for Kristianstad between 2014 and 2017. As of the 2017–18 season, he is Director of Sport for the club. Since 1 May 2026, he has been a member of the management board and Director of Sport (Sportvorstand) of German Bundesliga club MT Melsungen.
