= 1998 European Men's Handball Championship =

Handball sports season in Italy

Tournament details
- Host country: Italy
- Venue: 2 (in 2 host cities)
- Dates: 29 May – 7 June
- Teams: 12 (from 1 confederation)

Final positions
- Champions: Sweden (2nd title)
- Runners-up: Spain
- Third place: Germany
- Fourth place: Russia

Tournament statistics
- Matches played: 38
- Goals scored: 1,879 (49.45 per match)
- Attendance: 80,250 (2,112 per match)
- Top scorer(s): (Czech Republic) Jan Filip (48 goals)

Awards
- Best player: (Germany) Daniel Stephan

The 1998 European Men's Handball Championship was the third edition of the tournament and held in Italy from 29 May to 7 June 1998, in the cities of Meran and Bolzano. Sweden won the tournament after defeating Spain in the final, while Germany finished third.

== Qualification ==
Country	Qualified as	Previous appearances in tournament
Italy	Host	0 (Debut)
Russia	Defending champion	2 (1994, **1996**)
Croatia	Group 1 winner	2 (1994, 1996)
Macedonia	Group 1 runner-up	0 (Debut)
Yugoslavia	Group 2 winner	1 (1996)
Lithuania	Group 2 runner-up	0 (Debut)
France	Group 3 winner	2 (1994, 1996)
Czech Republic	Group 3 runner-up	1 (1996)
Germany	Group 4 winner	2 (1994, 1996)
Spain	Group 4 runner-up	2 (1994, 1996)
Hungary	Group 5 winner	2 (1994, 1996)
Sweden	Group 5 runner-up	2 (**1994**, 1996)

Note: Bold indicates champion for that year. Italic indicates host for that year.

== Venues ==
City	Stadium	Capacity
Bolzano	PalaOnda	7.200
Merano	Meranarena	4.000

== Preliminary round ==
All times are local (UTC+2).

=== Group A ===
Pos	Team	Pld	W	D	L	GF	GA	GD	Pts	Qualification
1	Sweden	5	4	0	1	130	111	+19	8 (Note: Germany 20–21 Sweden)	Semifinals
2	Germany	5	4	0	1	125	102	+23	8	Semifinals
3	Yugoslavia	5	3	0	2	125	121	+4	6	Fifth place game
4	France	5	1	1	3	110	125	−15	3 (Note: France 20–20 Lithuania)	Seventh place game
5	Lithuania	5	1	1	3	100	115	−15	3	Ninth place game
6	Italy (H)	5	1	0	4	106	122	−16	2	Eleventh place game

Source: EHF
(H) Hosts
Notes:

29 May 1998; 16:00	**France**	**20–20**	**Lithuania**	PalaOnda, Bolzano; Attendance: 1,600; Referees: Gallego, Lamas (ESP)
29 May 1998; 16:00	Stoecklin 8	(9–10)	Vilaniškis 6	PalaOnda, Bolzano; Attendance: 1,600; Referees: Gallego, Lamas (ESP)
29 May 1998; 16:00	3× (yellow card) 4× (suspension)	Report	4× (yellow card) 4× (suspension)	PalaOnda, Bolzano; Attendance: 1,600; Referees: Gallego, Lamas (ESP)

29 May 1998; 18:00	**Germany**	**20–21**	**Sweden**	PalaOnda, Bolzano; Attendance: 2,900; Referees: Kalin, Korič (SLO)
29 May 1998; 18:00	Kretzschmar, Schwalb 5	(12–10)	Lövgren 5	PalaOnda, Bolzano; Attendance: 2,900; Referees: Kalin, Korič (SLO)
29 May 1998; 18:00	3× (yellow card) 6× (suspension)	Report	4× (yellow card) 7× (suspension)	PalaOnda, Bolzano; Attendance: 2,900; Referees: Kalin, Korič (SLO)

29 May 1998; 20:00	**Yugoslavia**	**26–19**	**Italy**	PalaOnda, Bolzano; Attendance: 3,100; Referees: Øie, Høgsnes (NOR)
29 May 1998; 20:00	Peruničić 8	(13–10)	Kobilica, Tabanelli 4	PalaOnda, Bolzano; Attendance: 3,100; Referees: Øie, Høgsnes (NOR)
29 May 1998; 20:00	3× (yellow card) 1× (suspension)	Report	4× (yellow card) 1× (suspension)	PalaOnda, Bolzano; Attendance: 3,100; Referees: Øie, Høgsnes (NOR)

30 May 1998; 16:00	**Sweden**	**25–22**	**France**	PalaOnda, Bolzano; Attendance: 4,600; Referees: Vujnović, Mladinić (CRO)
30 May 1998; 16:00	three players 5	(13–13)	Fernandez 6	PalaOnda, Bolzano; Attendance: 4,600; Referees: Vujnović, Mladinić (CRO)
30 May 1998; 16:00	3× (yellow card) 3× (suspension)	Report	3× (yellow card) 2× (suspension)	PalaOnda, Bolzano; Attendance: 4,600; Referees: Vujnović, Mladinić (CRO)

30 May 1998; 18:00	**Lithuania**	**22–30**	**Yugoslavia**	PalaOnda, Bolzano; Attendance: 5,000; Referees: Migas, Bavas (GRE)
30 May 1998; 18:00	Marcinkevičius 6	(11–15)	Škrbić 7	PalaOnda, Bolzano; Attendance: 5,000; Referees: Migas, Bavas (GRE)
30 May 1998; 18:00	4× (yellow card) 7× (suspension) 1× (red card)	Report	4× (yellow card) 2× (suspension)	PalaOnda, Bolzano; Attendance: 5,000; Referees: Migas, Bavas (GRE)

30 May 1998; 20:00	**Italy**	**18–26**	**Germany**	PalaOnda, Bolzano; Attendance: 5,600; Referees: Gallego, Lamas (ESP)
30 May 1998; 20:00	Fusina 5	(9–12)	Kretzschmar 7	PalaOnda, Bolzano; Attendance: 5,600; Referees: Gallego, Lamas (ESP)
30 May 1998; 20:00	2× (yellow card) 3× (suspension)	Report	3× (yellow card) 4× (suspension)	PalaOnda, Bolzano; Attendance: 5,600; Referees: Gallego, Lamas (ESP)

1 June 1998; 16:00	**Lithuania**	**21–27**	**Sweden**	PalaOnda, Bolzano; Attendance: 2,900; Referees: Arnaldsson, Erlingsson (ISL)
1 June 1998; 16:00	Bučys, Rasikevičius 6	(9–14)	Petersson 8	PalaOnda, Bolzano; Attendance: 2,900; Referees: Arnaldsson, Erlingsson (ISL)
1 June 1998; 16:00	3× (yellow card) 2× (suspension)	Report	3× (yellow card) 2× (suspension)	PalaOnda, Bolzano; Attendance: 2,900; Referees: Arnaldsson, Erlingsson (ISL)

1 June 1998; 18:00	**Yugoslavia**	**22–29**	**Germany**	PalaOnda, Bolzano; Attendance: 4,700; Referees: Øie, Høgsnes (NOR)
1 June 1998; 18:00	Butulija 6	(11–14)	Stephan 7	PalaOnda, Bolzano; Attendance: 4,700; Referees: Øie, Høgsnes (NOR)
1 June 1998; 18:00	2× (yellow card) 2× (suspension)	Report	2× (yellow card) 3× (suspension)	PalaOnda, Bolzano; Attendance: 4,700; Referees: Øie, Høgsnes (NOR)

1 June 1998; 20:00	**France**	**23–22**	**Italy**	PalaOnda, Bolzano; Attendance: 2,800; Referees: Migas, Bavas (GRE)
1 June 1998; 20:00	Stoecklin 6	(11–10)	Schmidt 7	PalaOnda, Bolzano; Attendance: 2,800; Referees: Migas, Bavas (GRE)
1 June 1998; 20:00	3× (yellow card) 4× (suspension)	Report	2× (yellow card) 2× (suspension)	PalaOnda, Bolzano; Attendance: 2,800; Referees: Migas, Bavas (GRE)

3 June 1998; 18:00	**Yugoslavia**	**19–29**	**Sweden**	Meranarena, Merano; Attendance: 2,500; Referees: Gallego, Lamas (ESP)
3 June 1998; 18:00	Butulija 6	(13–15)	Lövgren 9	Meranarena, Merano; Attendance: 2,500; Referees: Gallego, Lamas (ESP)
3 June 1998; 18:00	4× (yellow card) 2× (suspension)	Report	3× (yellow card) 4× (suspension)	Meranarena, Merano; Attendance: 2,500; Referees: Gallego, Lamas (ESP)

3 June 1998; 20:00	**Germany**	**30–23**	**France**	Meranarena, Merano; Attendance: 4,300; Referees: Vujnović, Mladinić (CRO)
3 June 1998; 20:00	Kretzschmar, Stephan 8	(13–11)	Stoecklin 4	Meranarena, Merano; Attendance: 4,300; Referees: Vujnović, Mladinić (CRO)
3 June 1998; 20:00	2× (yellow card) 3× (suspension)	Report	3× (yellow card) 3× (suspension)	Meranarena, Merano; Attendance: 4,300; Referees: Vujnović, Mladinić (CRO)

3 June 1998; 20:00	**Italy**	**18–19**	**Lithuania**	PalaOnda, Bolzano; Attendance: 1,000; Referees: Kalin, Korič (SLO)
3 June 1998; 20:00	Massotti, Tarafino 5	(10–9)	Savukynas 5	PalaOnda, Bolzano; Attendance: 1,000; Referees: Kalin, Korič (SLO)
3 June 1998; 20:00	3× (yellow card) 5× (suspension)	Report	2× (yellow card) 5× (suspension)	PalaOnda, Bolzano; Attendance: 1,000; Referees: Kalin, Korič (SLO)

4 June 1998; 18:00	**France**	**22–28**	**Yugoslavia**	Meranarena, Merano; Attendance: 2,200; Referees: Bülow, Lübker (GER)
4 June 1998; 18:00	Gille 6	(14–14)	Maksić 8	Meranarena, Merano; Attendance: 2,200; Referees: Bülow, Lübker (GER)
4 June 1998; 18:00	3× (yellow card) 3× (suspension)	Report	3× (yellow card) 5× (suspension)	Meranarena, Merano; Attendance: 2,200; Referees: Bülow, Lübker (GER)

4 June 1998; 20:00	**Sweden**	**28–29**	**Italy**	PalaOnda, Bolzano; Attendance: 1,000; Referees: Garcia, Moreno (FRA)
4 June 1998; 20:00	Larsson 8	(13–12)	Kobilica 10	PalaOnda, Bolzano; Attendance: 1,000; Referees: Garcia, Moreno (FRA)
4 June 1998; 20:00	3× (yellow card) 3× (suspension)	Report	3× (yellow card) 1× (suspension)	PalaOnda, Bolzano; Attendance: 1,000; Referees: Garcia, Moreno (FRA)

4 June 1998; 20:00	**Germany**	**20–18**	**Lithuania**	Meranarena, Merano; Attendance: 2,400; Referees: Migas, Bavas (GRE)
4 June 1998; 20:00	Ziercke 5	(9–5)	three players 4	Meranarena, Merano; Attendance: 2,400; Referees: Migas, Bavas (GRE)
4 June 1998; 20:00	3× (yellow card) 2× (suspension)	Report	3× (yellow card) 5× (suspension) 1× (red card)	Meranarena, Merano; Attendance: 2,400; Referees: Migas, Bavas (GRE)

=== Group B ===
Pos	Team	Pld	W	D	L	GF	GA	GD	Pts	Qualification
1	Spain	5	4	1	0	135	103	+32	9	Semifinals
2	Russia	5	3	1	1	127	110	+17	7	Semifinals
3	Hungary	5	3	0	2	121	122	−1	6	Fifth place game
4	Croatia	5	2	1	2	117	120	−3	5	Seventh place game
5	Czech Republic	5	1	0	4	130	132	−2	2	Ninth place game
6	Macedonia	5	0	1	4	104	147	−43	1	Eleventh place game

Source: EHF

29 May 1998; 16:00	**Hungary**	**29–20**	**Macedonia**	Meranarena, Merano; Attendance: 250; Referees: Masi, Di Piero (ITA)
29 May 1998; 16:00	Kotormán 7	(14–7)	Manaskov 7	Meranarena, Merano; Attendance: 250; Referees: Masi, Di Piero (ITA)
29 May 1998; 16:00	3× (yellow card) 2× (suspension)	Report	3× (yellow card) 3× (suspension)	Meranarena, Merano; Attendance: 250; Referees: Masi, Di Piero (ITA)

29 May 1998; 18:00	**Russia**	**22–21**	**Czech Republic**	Meranarena, Merano; Referees: Garcia, Moreno (FRA)
29 May 1998; 18:00	Filippov 9	(11–8)	Tancoš 6	Meranarena, Merano; Referees: Garcia, Moreno (FRA)
29 May 1998; 18:00	2× (yellow card) 5× (suspension)	Report	3× (yellow card) 4× (suspension)	Meranarena, Merano; Referees: Garcia, Moreno (FRA)

29 May 1998; 20:00	**Croatia**	**18–18**	**Spain**	Meranarena, Merano; Referees: Bülow, Lübker (GER)
29 May 1998; 20:00	Saračević 5	(11–10)	Lozano 5	Meranarena, Merano; Referees: Bülow, Lübker (GER)
29 May 1998; 20:00	2× (yellow card) 4× (suspension)	Report	2× (yellow card) 5× (suspension)	Meranarena, Merano; Referees: Bülow, Lübker (GER)

31 May 1998; 16:00	**Czech Republic**	**24–30**	**Croatia**	Meranarena, Merano; Attendance: 700; Referees: Arnaldsson, Erlingsson (ISL)
31 May 1998; 16:00	Filip 8	(14–15)	Ćavar 11	Meranarena, Merano; Attendance: 700; Referees: Arnaldsson, Erlingsson (ISL)
31 May 1998; 16:00	3× (yellow card) 4× (suspension)	Report	3× (yellow card) 4× (suspension)	Meranarena, Merano; Attendance: 700; Referees: Arnaldsson, Erlingsson (ISL)

31 May 1998; 18:00	**Macedonia**	**26–26**	**Russia**	Meranarena, Merano; Attendance: 1,100; Referees: Bülow, Lübker (GER)
31 May 1998; 18:00	Manaskov 12	(10–16)	Koksharov 8	Meranarena, Merano; Attendance: 1,100; Referees: Bülow, Lübker (GER)
31 May 1998; 18:00	3× (yellow card) 6× (suspension)	Report	3× (yellow card) 4× (suspension)	Meranarena, Merano; Attendance: 1,100; Referees: Bülow, Lübker (GER)

31 May 1998; 20:00	**Spain**	**27–17**	**Hungary**	Meranarena, Merano; Attendance: 1,100; Referees: Øie, Høgsnes (NOR)
31 May 1998; 20:00	three players 4	(17–3)	Pásztor 4	Meranarena, Merano; Attendance: 1,100; Referees: Øie, Høgsnes (NOR)
31 May 1998; 20:00	3× (yellow card) 2× (suspension)	Report	3× (yellow card) 4× (suspension)	Meranarena, Merano; Attendance: 1,100; Referees: Øie, Høgsnes (NOR)

1 June 1998; 16:00	**Croatia**	**28–21**	**Macedonia**	Meranarena, Merano; Attendance: 200; Referees: Garcia, Moreno (FRA)
1 June 1998; 16:00	Ćavar 8	(12–10)	Kotevski, Petreski 5	Meranarena, Merano; Attendance: 200; Referees: Garcia, Moreno (FRA)
1 June 1998; 16:00	3× (yellow card) 4× (suspension) 1× (red card)	Report	3× (yellow card) 2× (suspension)	Meranarena, Merano; Attendance: 200; Referees: Garcia, Moreno (FRA)

1 June 1998; 18:00	**Hungary**	**20–23**	**Russia**	Meranarena, Merano; Attendance: 250; Referees: Kalin, Korič (SLO)
1 June 1998; 18:00	Csoknyai, Kotormán 4	(10–13)	Voronin 5	Meranarena, Merano; Attendance: 250; Referees: Kalin, Korič (SLO)
1 June 1998; 18:00	2× (yellow card) 5× (suspension)	Report	3× (yellow card) 4× (suspension)	Meranarena, Merano; Attendance: 250; Referees: Kalin, Korič (SLO)

1 June 1998; 20:00	**Spain**	**35–22**	**Czech Republic**	Meranarena, Merano; Attendance: 400; Referees: Masi, Piero (ITA)
1 June 1998; 20:00	Guijosa 12	(17–9)	Filip 5	Meranarena, Merano; Attendance: 400; Referees: Masi, Piero (ITA)
1 June 1998; 20:00	2× (yellow card) 3× (suspension)	Report	3× (yellow card) 4× (suspension)	Meranarena, Merano; Attendance: 400; Referees: Masi, Piero (ITA)

3 June 1998; 16:00	**Hungary**	**27–25**	**Czech Republic**	PalaOnda, Bolzano; Attendance: 350; Referees: Bülow, Lübker (GER)
3 June 1998; 16:00	Pásztor 11	(13–8)	Lanča 11	PalaOnda, Bolzano; Attendance: 350; Referees: Bülow, Lübker (GER)
3 June 1998; 16:00	3× (yellow card) 7× (suspension)	Report	3× (yellow card) 8× (suspension) 1× (red card)	PalaOnda, Bolzano; Attendance: 350; Referees: Bülow, Lübker (GER)

3 June 1998; 16:00	**Macedonia**	**19–26**	**Spain**	Meranarena, Merano; Attendance: 1,200; Referees: Arnaldsson, Erlingsson (ISL)
3 June 1998; 16:00	Kotevski 6	(10–13)	Ortega 7	Meranarena, Merano; Attendance: 1,200; Referees: Arnaldsson, Erlingsson (ISL)
3 June 1998; 16:00	4× (yellow card) 2× (suspension)	Report	4× (yellow card) 5× (suspension)	Meranarena, Merano; Attendance: 1,200; Referees: Arnaldsson, Erlingsson (ISL)

3 June 1998; 18:00	**Russia**	**29–14**	**Croatia**	PalaOnda, Bolzano; Attendance: 900; Referees: Øie, Høgsnes (NOR)
3 June 1998; 18:00	Koksharov 8	(12–8)	Ćavar 5	PalaOnda, Bolzano; Attendance: 900; Referees: Øie, Høgsnes (NOR)
3 June 1998; 18:00	3× (yellow card) 5× (suspension)	Report	4× (yellow card) 7× (suspension)	PalaOnda, Bolzano; Attendance: 900; Referees: Øie, Høgsnes (NOR)

4 June 1998; 16:00	**Russia**	**27–29**	**Spain**	Meranarena, Merano; Attendance: 2,000; Referees: Kalin, Korič (SLO)
4 June 1998; 16:00	Khodkov 7	(15–11)	Guijosa 6	Meranarena, Merano; Attendance: 2,000; Referees: Kalin, Korič (SLO)
4 June 1998; 16:00	3× (yellow card) 5× (suspension)	Report	2× (yellow card) 2× (suspension)	Meranarena, Merano; Attendance: 2,000; Referees: Kalin, Korič (SLO)

4 June 1998; 16:00	**Croatia**	**27–28**	**Hungary**	PalaOnda, Bolzano; Attendance: 300; Referees: Arnaldsson, Erlingsson (ISL)
4 June 1998; 16:00	Ćavar, Goluža 6	(10–13)	Pásztor 12	PalaOnda, Bolzano; Attendance: 300; Referees: Arnaldsson, Erlingsson (ISL)
4 June 1998; 16:00	3× (yellow card) 7× (suspension) 1× (red card)	Report	3× (yellow card) 8× (suspension) 1× (red card)	PalaOnda, Bolzano; Attendance: 300; Referees: Arnaldsson, Erlingsson (ISL)

4 June 1998; 18:00	**Czech Republic**	**38–18**	**Macedonia**	PalaOnda, Bolzano; Attendance: 400; Referees: Masi, Di Piero (ITA)
4 June 1998; 18:00	Filip, Lanča 10	(16–12)	Novokmet 7	PalaOnda, Bolzano; Attendance: 400; Referees: Masi, Di Piero (ITA)
4 June 1998; 18:00	3× (yellow card) 4× (suspension)	Report	2× (yellow card) 3× (suspension)	PalaOnda, Bolzano; Attendance: 400; Referees: Masi, Di Piero (ITA)

== Placement games ==
=== Eleventh place game ===
6 June 1998
14:00
Italy
**27–26** **(ET)**
Macedonia
Meranarena, Merano
Attendance: 1,200
Referees: Garcia, Moreno (FRA)
Massotti 9
(11–12)
Novokmet 7
2× (yellow card) 5× (suspension)
Report
3× (yellow card) 3× (suspension)

FT: 23–23 ET: 4–3

=== Ninth place game ===
6 June 1998
16:00
Lithuania
**38–36** **(ET)**
Czech Republic
PalaOnda, Bolzano
Attendance: 1,200
Referees: Kalin, Korič (SLO)
Klimčiauskas 9
(17–14)
Filip 12
3× (yellow card) 8× (suspension)
Report
4× (yellow card) 10× (suspension) 2× (red card)

FT: 30–30 ET: 3–3, 5–3

=== Seventh place game ===
6 June 1998; 18:00	**France**	**30–28**	**Croatia**	PalaOnda, Bolzano; Attendance: 1,500; Referees: Migas, Bavas (GRE)
6 June 1998; 18:00	Fernandez 8	(16–12)	Mikulić 10	PalaOnda, Bolzano; Attendance: 1,500; Referees: Migas, Bavas (GRE)
6 June 1998; 18:00	3× (yellow card) 4× (suspension)	Report	3× (yellow card) 3× (suspension)	PalaOnda, Bolzano; Attendance: 1,500; Referees: Migas, Bavas (GRE)

=== Fifth place game ===
6 June 1998; 16:00	**Yugoslavia**	**32–24**	**Hungary**	Meranarena, Merano; Attendance: 2,400; Referees: Gallego, Lamas (ESP)
6 June 1998; 16:00	Jovanović 9	(15–12)	Kertész, Pásztor 6	Meranarena, Merano; Attendance: 2,400; Referees: Gallego, Lamas (ESP)
6 June 1998; 16:00	3× (yellow card) 3× (suspension)	Report	2× (yellow card) 4× (suspension)	Meranarena, Merano; Attendance: 2,400; Referees: Gallego, Lamas (ESP)

== Knockout stage ==
=== Bracket ===
Semifinals
6 June
**Spain**	**29**
Germany	22
6 June
**Sweden**	**27**
Russia	24

Final
7 June
Spain	23
**Sweden**	**25**
Third place
7 June
**Germany (ET)**	**30**
Russia	28

=== Semifinals ===
6 June 1998; 18:00	**Spain**	**29–22**	**Germany**	Meranarena, Merano; Attendance: 4,000; Referees: Arnaldsson, Erlingsson (ISL)
6 June 1998; 18:00	Ortega 6	(13–9)	Stephan 6	Meranarena, Merano; Attendance: 4,000; Referees: Arnaldsson, Erlingsson (ISL)
6 June 1998; 18:00	3× (yellow card) 4× (suspension)	Report	3× (yellow card) 3× (suspension)	Meranarena, Merano; Attendance: 4,000; Referees: Arnaldsson, Erlingsson (ISL)

6 June 1998; 20:00	**Sweden**	**27–24**	**Russia**	PalaOnda, Bolzano; Attendance: 3,000; Referees: Vujnović, Mladinić (CRO)
6 June 1998; 20:00	Lövgren 9	(15–14)	I. Lavrov 6	PalaOnda, Bolzano; Attendance: 3,000; Referees: Vujnović, Mladinić (CRO)
6 June 1998; 20:00	3× (yellow card) 2× (suspension)	Report	3× (yellow card) 2× (suspension)	PalaOnda, Bolzano; Attendance: 3,000; Referees: Vujnović, Mladinić (CRO)

=== Third place game ===
7 June 1998
14:00
Germany
**30–28** **(ET)**
Russia
PalaOnda, Bolzano
Attendance: 5,100
Referees: Masi, Di Piero (ITA)
Kretzschmar 10
(13–14)
Koksharov 7
3× (yellow card) 5× (suspension)
Report
3× (yellow card) 5× (suspension) 1× (red card)

FT: 25–25 ET: 5–3

=== Final ===
7 June 1998; 16:30	**Spain**	**23–25**	**Sweden**	PalaOnda, Bolzano; Attendance: 6,100; Referees: Øie, Høgsnes (NOR)
7 June 1998; 16:30	Xepkin 6	(9–15)	Petersson, Vranjes 6	PalaOnda, Bolzano; Attendance: 6,100; Referees: Øie, Høgsnes (NOR)
7 June 1998; 16:30	5× (yellow card) 2× (suspension)	Report	3× (yellow card) 3× (suspension)	PalaOnda, Bolzano; Attendance: 6,100; Referees: Øie, Høgsnes (NOR)

== Final ranking ==
Rank	Team
Gold medal	Sweden
Silver medal	Spain
Bronze medal	Germany
4	Russia
5	Yugoslavia
6	Hungary
7	France
8	Croatia
9	Lithuania
10	Czech Republic
11	Italy
12	Macedonia

== All-Star Team ==
Position	Player
Goalkeeper	Peter Gentzel (SWE)
Right wing	Johan Petersson (SWE)
Right back	Sergey Pogorelov (RUS)
Centre back	Talant Dujshebaev (ESP)
Left back	Daniel Stephan (GER)
Left wing	Stefan Kretzschmar (GER)
Pivot	Andrei Xepkin (ESP)
Most valuable player	Daniel Stephan (GER)

Source: EHF
