= Isaías Guardiola =

Spanish handball player (born 1984)

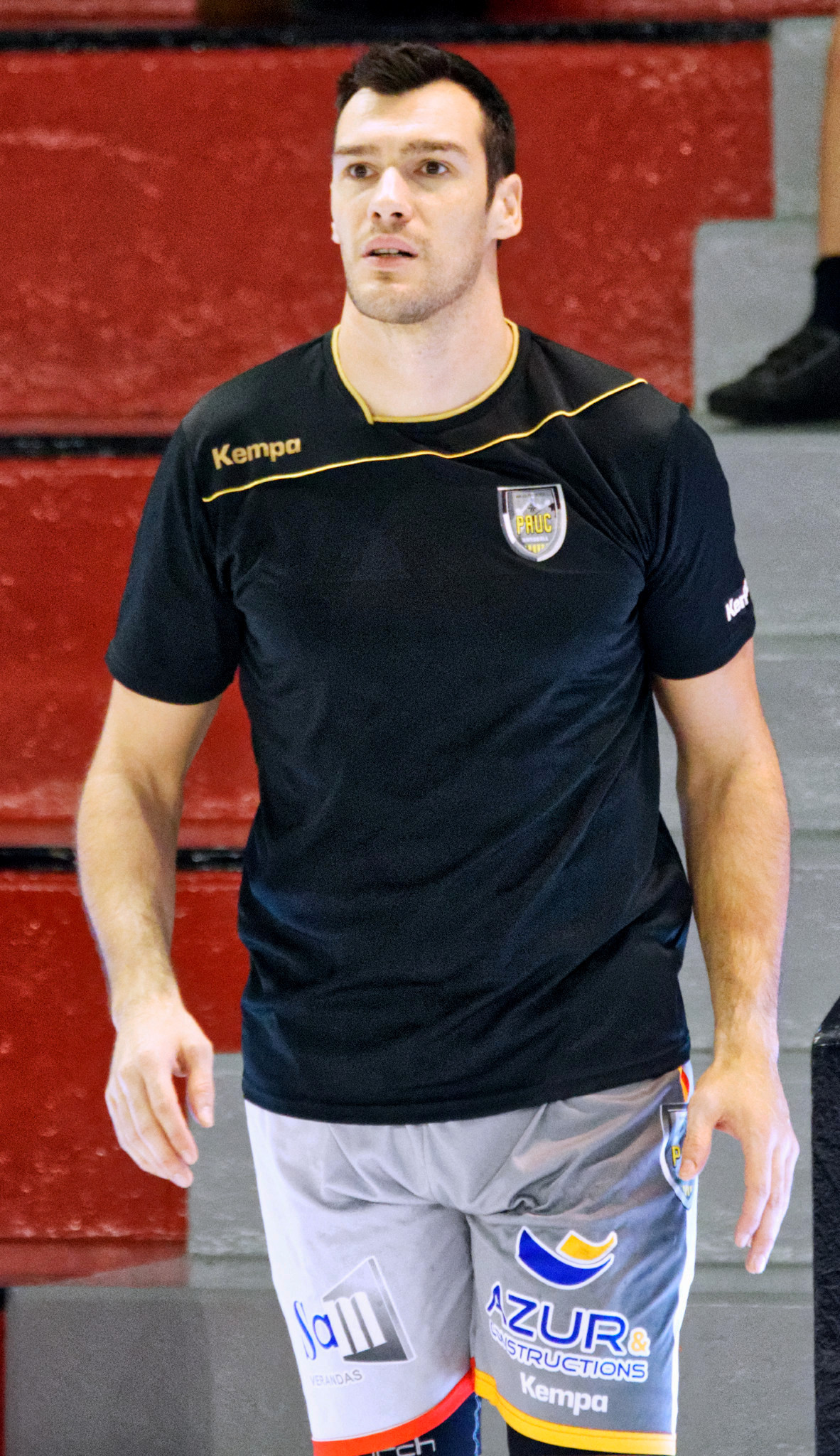
- Guardiola in 2015

Personal information
- Full name: Isaías Guardiola
- Nationality: Spanish
- Born: 1 October 1984 (age 42) Petrer, Spain
- Height: 2.00 m (6 ft 7 in)

Sport
- Sport: Handball
- Position: Right back

Senior clubs
- Years: Team
- 2003–2005: Valencia
- 2005–2010: Ciudad Logroño
- 2010–2011: Ciudad Real
- 2011–2012: Atlético Madrid
- 2012–2014: Rhein-Neckar Löwen
- 2014–2015: Aalborg Håndbold
- 2015–2016: Pays d'Aix UC
- 2016: → MVM Veszprém KC
- 2016–2017: HC Erlangen
- 2017–2023: TBV Lemgo
- 2023–2025: Viveros Herol BM Nava
National team
Years	Team	Apps	(Gls)
2008–2025	Spain	4	(11)

Teams managed
- 2025–: MT Melsungen (assistant)
- Updated on 2023

Isaías Guardiola Villaplana (born 1 October 1984, in Petrer) is a retired Spanish handball player.

He is a twin brother of Gedeón Guardiola, also a handballer.
