= List of people from Krasnodar =

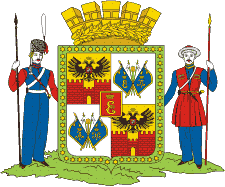
Coat of Arms of Krasnodar

This is a list of notable people who were born or have lived in Krasnodar (1793–1920: Yekaterinodar), Russia.

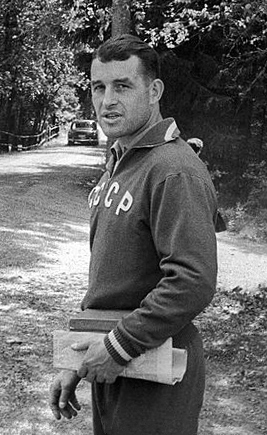
Sergei Salnikov (1925–1984)

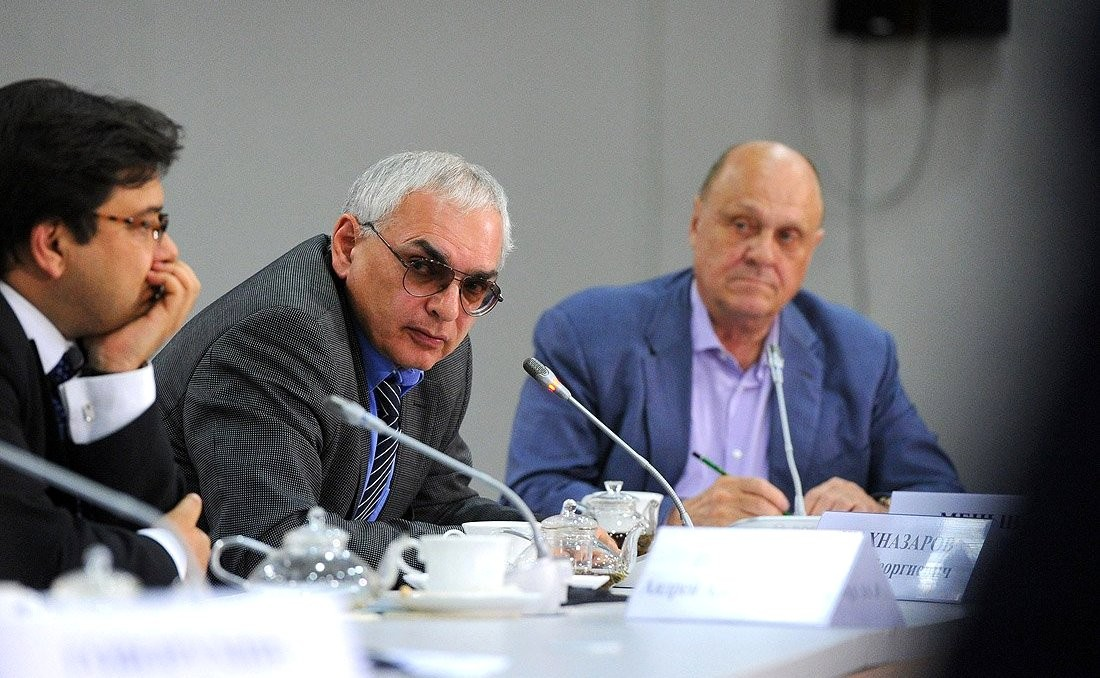
Karen Shakhnazarov (born 1952)

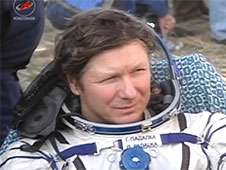
Gennady Padalka (born 1958)

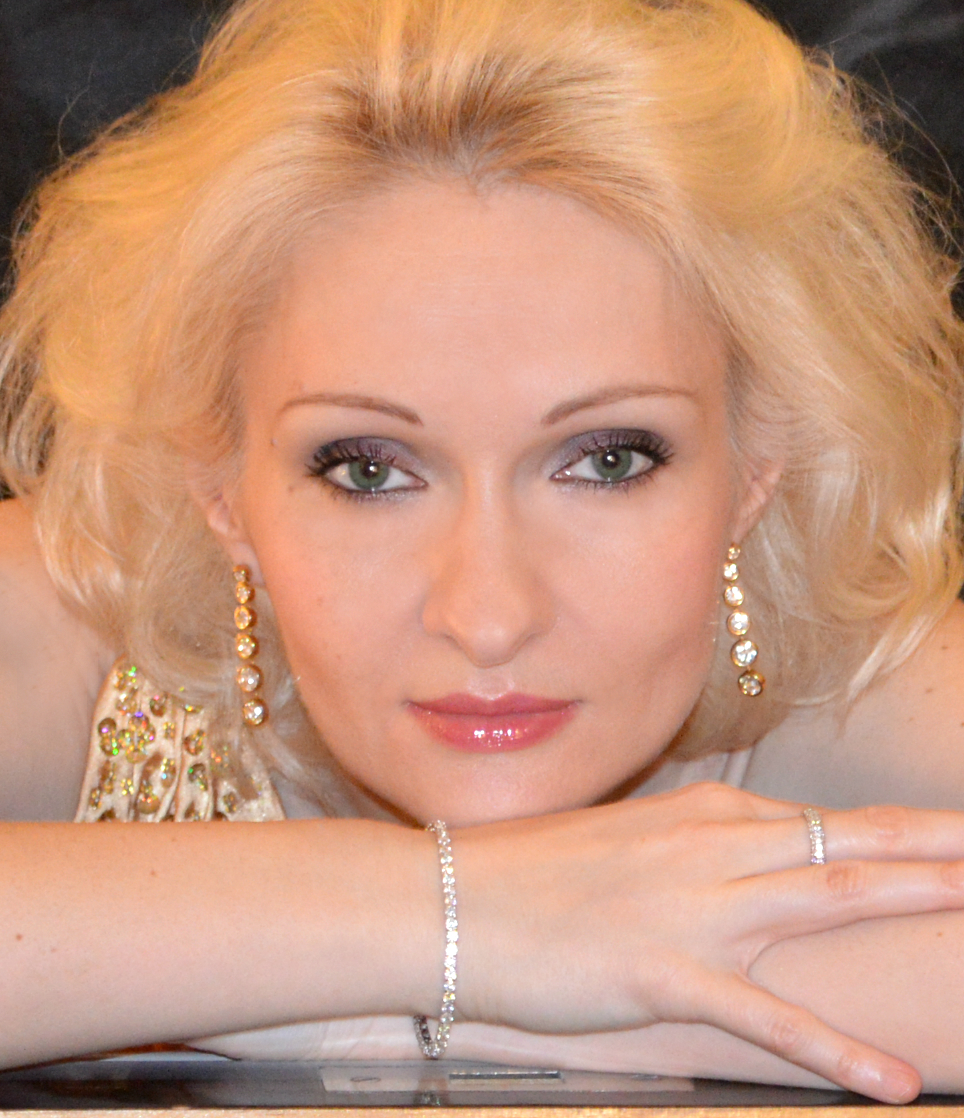
Violetta Egorova (born 1969)

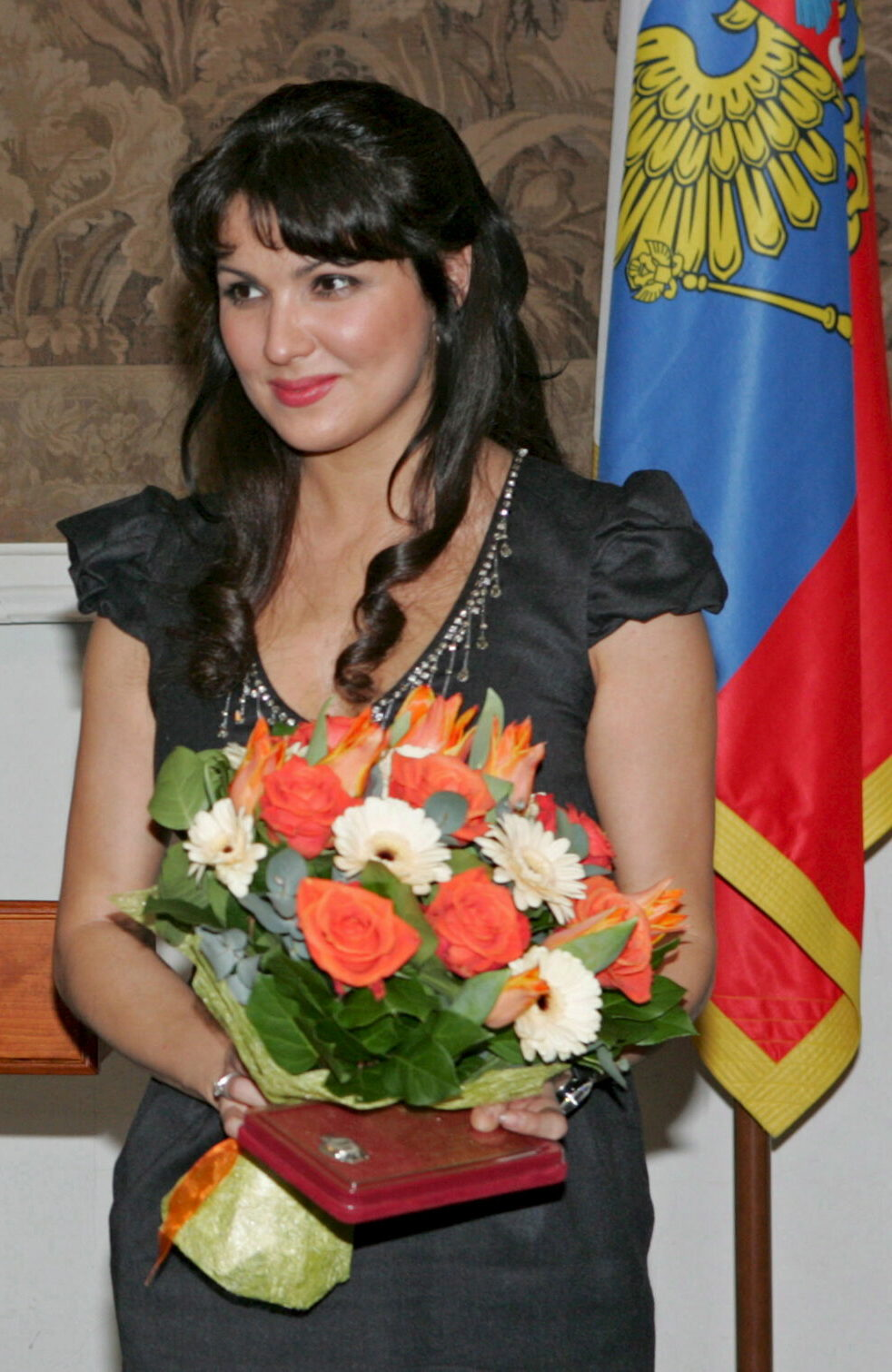
Anna Netrebko (born 1971)

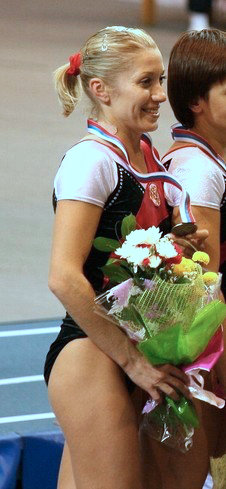
Irina Karavayeva (born 1975)

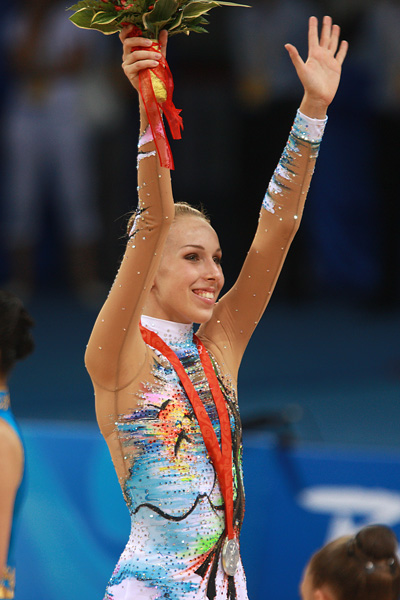
Inna Zhukova (born 1986)

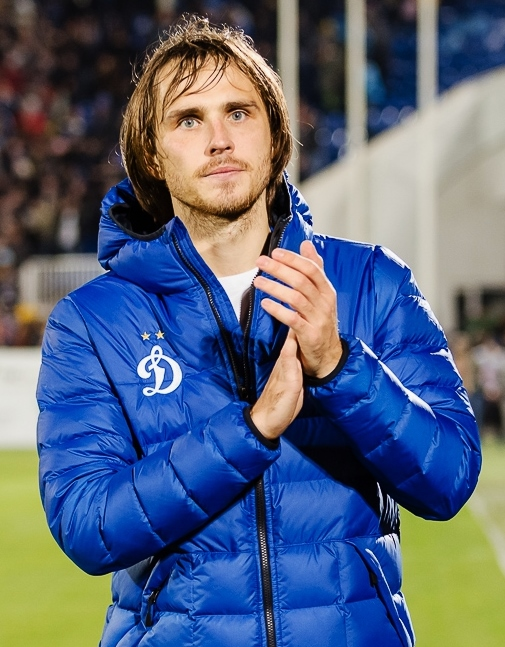
Vitali Dyakov (born 1989)

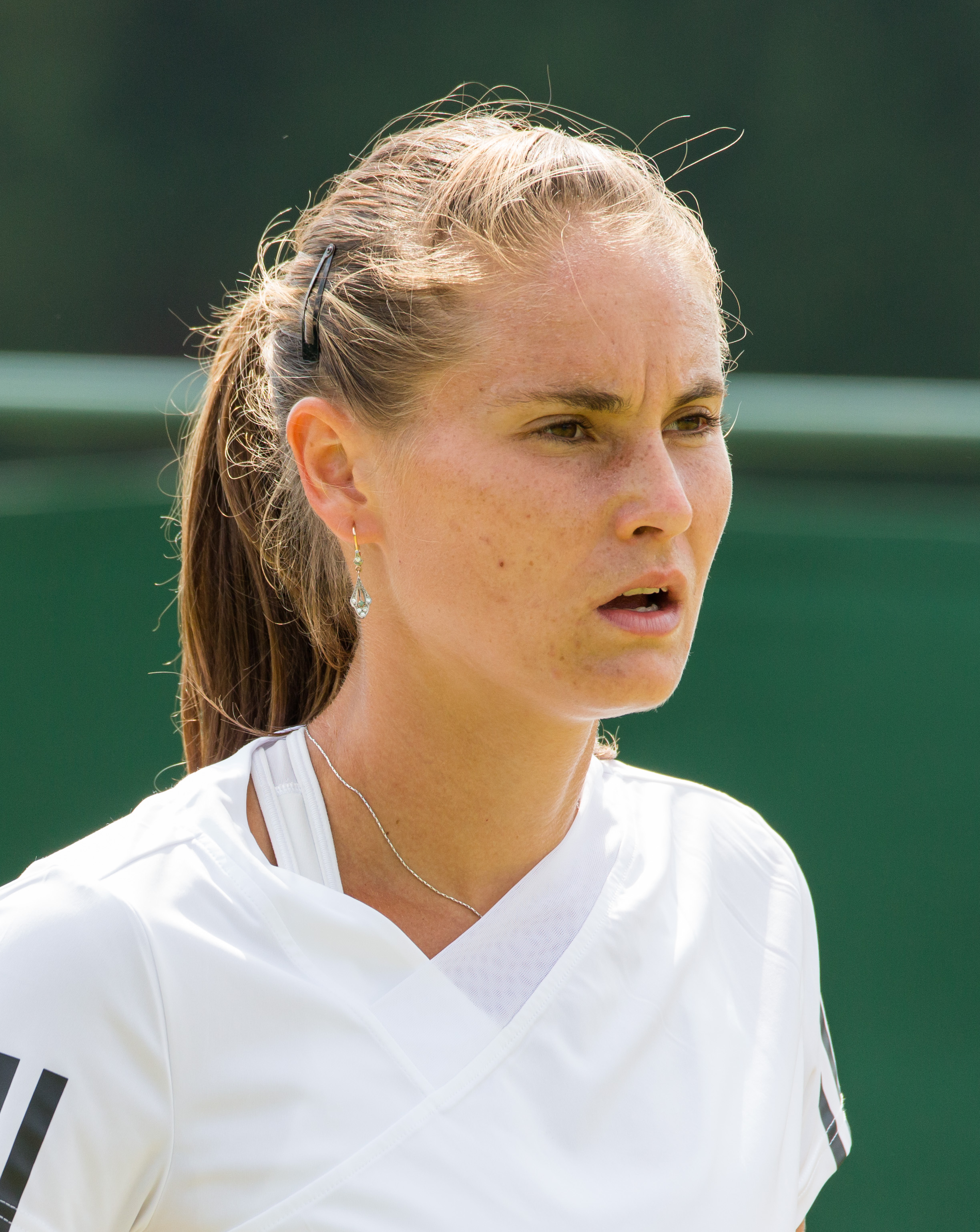
Alexandra Panova (born 1989)

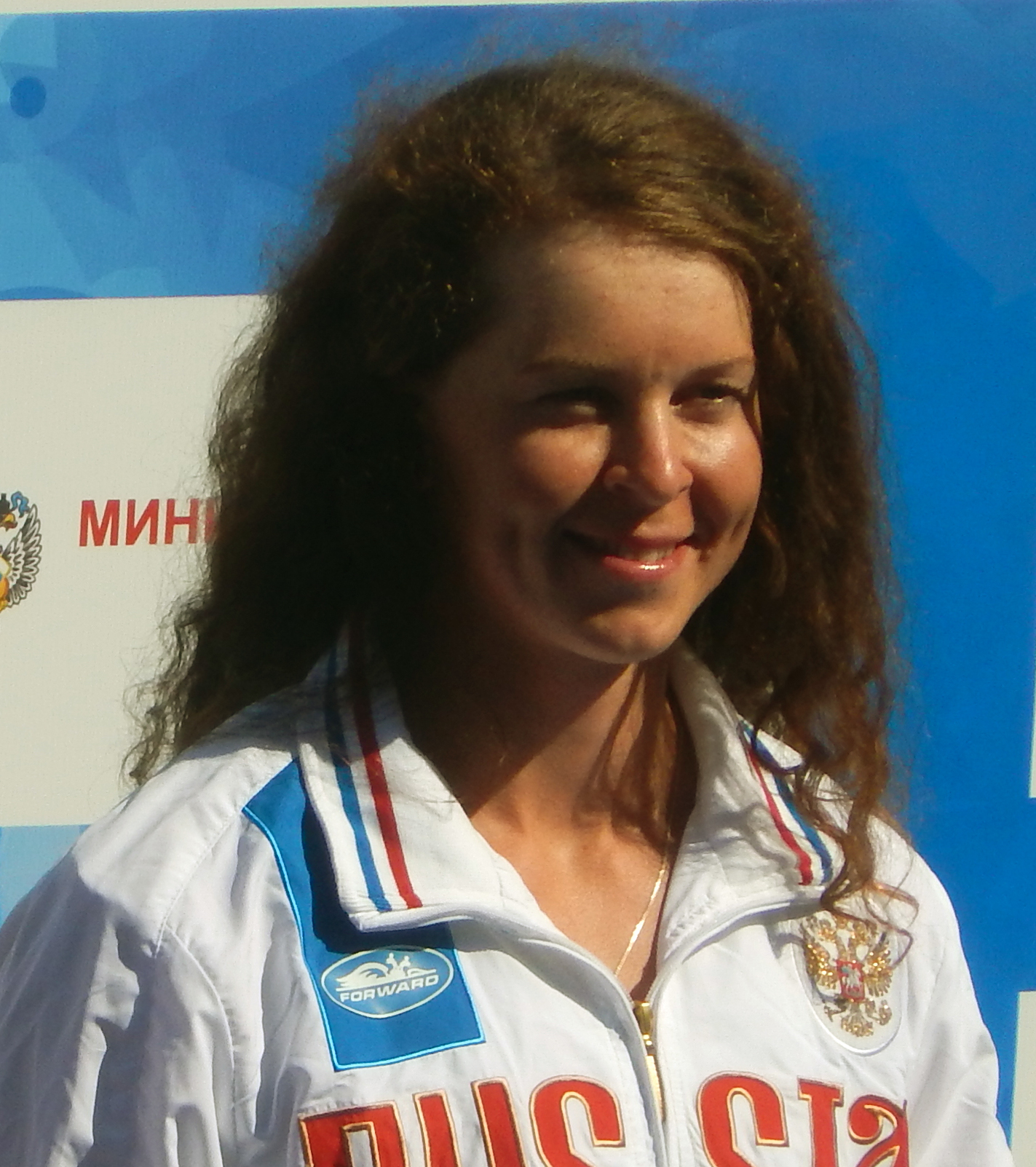
Olesia Romasenko (born 1990)

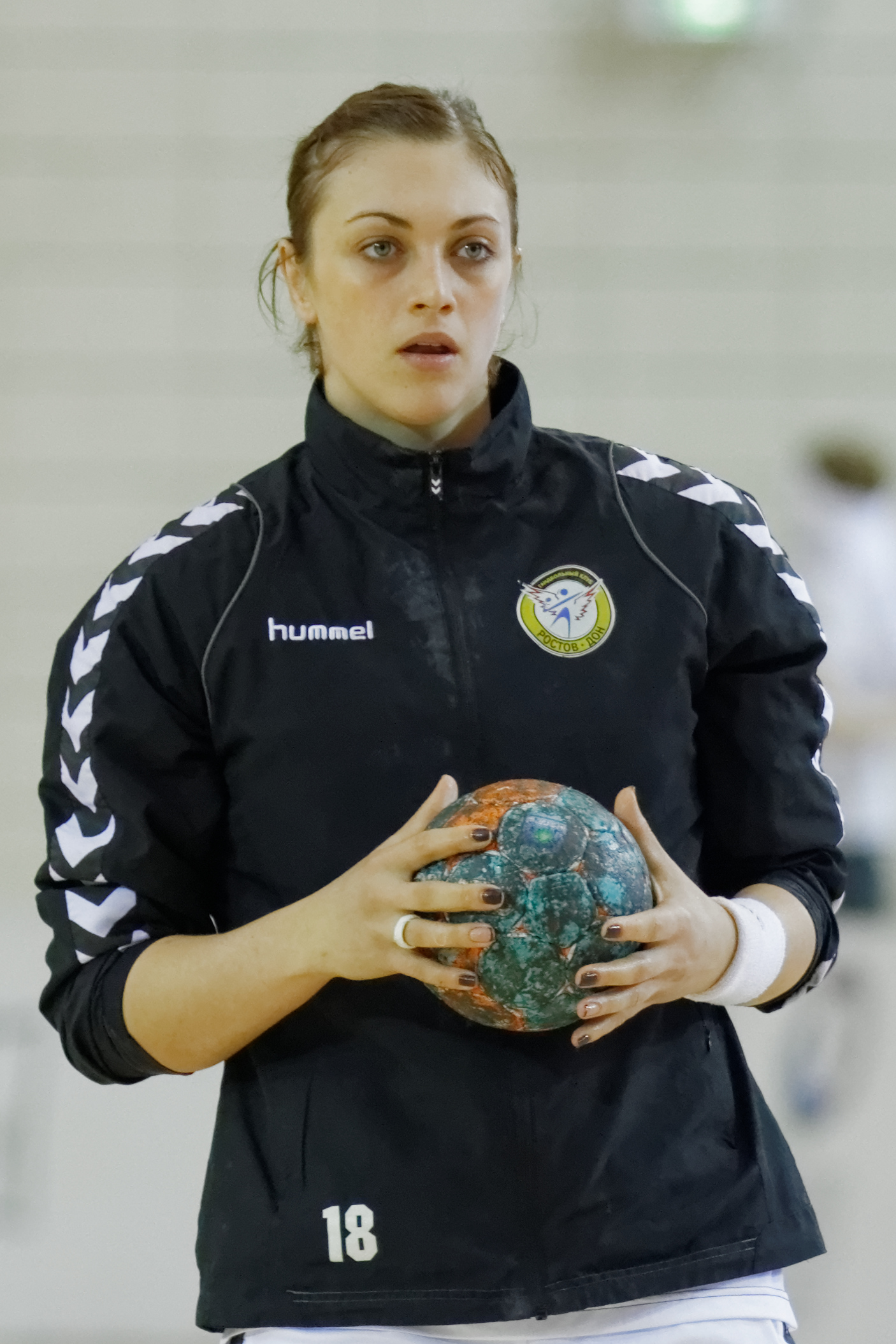
Anna Sen (born 1990)

== Born in Krasnodar ==
=== 19th century ===
==== 1801–1850 ====
- Dmitry Averkiyev (1836–1905), Russian playwright, theatre critic, novelist, publicist and translator

==== 1851–1900 ====
- Adamovych-Hlibiv (late 1870s–first half of the 1900s), bandurist
- Alexander Tamanian (1878–1936), Russian-born Armenian neoclassical architect
- Andrei Shkuro (1887–1947), Lieutenant General of the White Army
- Semyon Kirlian (1898–1978), Russian inventor and researcher of Armenian descent
- Pyotr Gavrilov (1900–1979), Soviet war hero, last defender of the Brest Fortress

=== 20th century ===
==== 1901–1930 ====
- Stanisław Szpinalski (1901–1957), Polish pianist
- Valeriy Tereshchenko (1901–1994), Russian scientist in the field of management
- Pavel Parenago (1906–1960), Soviet scientist, astronomer, and professor
- Leonid Ilyichev (1906–1990), Soviet politician and journalist
- Elena Skuin (1908–1986), Soviet and Russian painter, watercolorist, graphic artist, and art teacher
- Marina Denikina (1919–2005), Russian-born French writer and journalist
- Yevgeniya Zhigulenko (1920–1994), Russian pilot and navigator in the 46th Taman Guards Night Bomber Aviation Regiment (Night Witches) of the Soviet Air Forces during World War II who was awarded the title Hero of the Soviet Union
- Alexander Grunauer (1921–2013), Soviet scientist and expert in the field of problems of regulation of internal combustion engines
- Nikolay Dorizo (1923–2011), Russian poet
- Valentin Varennikov (1923–2009), Soviet Army general and Russian politician
- Grigory Mkrtychan (1925–2003), Soviet and Russian ice hockey goalkeeper
- Sergei Salnikov (1925–1984), Russian football player and manager
- Pavel Rakityansky (1928-1992), was a Russian modern pentathlete. He competed at the 1952 Summer Olympics.
- Eduard Grigoryan (1929–1988), Soviet professional soccer player, coach and manager of FC Ararat

==== 1931–1960 ====
- Vitold Kreyer (1932–2020), Russian triple jumper
- Viktor Likhonosov (1936–2021), writer
- Vera Galushka-Duyunova (1945–2012), Russian volleyball player
- Viktor Popkov (1946–2001), Russian Christian, dissident, humanitarian, human rights activist and journalist
- Alexander Varchenko (born 1949), Soviet and Russian mathematician
- Sergei Vorzhev (1950–2023), artist
- Karen Shakhnazarov (born 1952), Soviet and Russian-Armenian filmmaker, producer and screenwriter
- Mikhail Strikhanov (born 1952), Russian physicist
- Lyubov Rusanova (born 1954), Russian swimmer
- Sergey Arakelov (born 1957), Russian heavyweight weightlifter
- Yekaterina Fesenko (born 1958), Russian athlete
- Yevgeny Lipeyev (born 1958), Soviet modern pentathlete and Olympic Champion
- Gennady Padalka (born 1958), Russian Air Force officer and cosmonaut

==== 1961–1970 ====
- Vissarion (born 1961), Russian mystic and spiritual leader
- Vladimir Grig (born 1962), Russian artist and musician
- Mikhail Guzev (born 1962), Russian mathematician, mechanician and a corresponding member of the Russian Academy of Sciences
- Andrey Lavrov (born 1962), Russian and Soviet handball goalkeeper
- Pavel Sukosyan (born 1962), Russian handball player
- Igor Pestretsov (born 1963), Russian former professional footballer
- Nikolai Yuzhanin (born 1963), Russian professional football coach and a former player
- Sergei Kovalyov (born 1965), Russian professional football player
- Valentina Ogiyenko (born 1965), Russian volleyball player
- Irina Mushayilova (born 1967), Russian athlete
- Vadim Rudenko (born 1967), Russian pianist
- Tatyana Shikolenko (born 1968), Russian track and field athlete who competed in the javelin throw
- Violetta Egorova (born 1969), concert pianist
- Dmitry Filippov (born 1969), Russian handball player
- Radzislaw Arlowski (born 1970), Belarusian professional footballer
- Albert Avdolyan (born 1970), Russian businessman

==== 1971–1980 ====
- Aleksandr Karasyov (born 1971), writer
- Anna Netrebko (born 1971), Russian and Austrian opera singer
- Pavel Tregubov (born 1971), Russian chess Grandmaster
- Alexandre Bondar (born 1972), Russian writer and novelist
- Yevgeni Plotnikov (born 1972), Russian professional football coach and player
- Evgeny Pechonkin (born 1973), Russian bobsledder
- Sergei Tiviakov (born 1973), chess Grandmaster
- Oleg Khodkov (born 1974), Russian handball player
- Vitali Ushakov (born 1974), Russian football player
- Igor Dubrovskikh (born 1975), Russian professional football player
- Irina Fedotova (born 1975), Russian rower
- Irina Karavayeva (born 1975), trampoline gymnast
- Dmitri Khokhlov (born 1975), Russian football player and coach
- Eduard Koksharov (1975—2026), Russian handball player
- Vladimir Pantyushenko (born 1975), Russian professional football player
- Natalia Chernova (born 1976), gymnast
- Andrei Chuprina (born 1976), Russian football player
- Maksim Demenko (born 1976), Russian professional footballer
- Mikhail Voronov (born 1976), Russian professional footballer
- Maksim Buznikin (born 1977), Russian professional footballer
- Andrei Chichkin (born 1977), Russian association football goalkeeper
- Yehor Soboliev (born 1977), Ukrainian politician and former journalist
- Dmitriy Vorobyov (born 1977), Russian professional footballer
- Aleksandr Krestinin (born 1978), Russian professional football player and manager
- Aleksandr Chernoivanov (born 1979), Russian handball player
- Igor Kiselyov (1979–2014), Russian professional footballer
- Aleksey Savrasenko (born 1979), Russian-Greek professional basketball player
- Vitali Kaleshin (born 1980), Russian professional footballer
- Igor Kot (born 1980), Russian professional footballer
- Lazaros Papadopoulos (born 1980), Greek basketball player
- Margarita Simonyan (born 1980), Russian journalist
- Andrei Topchu (born 1980), Russian football player

==== 1981–1990 ====
- Dmitry Trapeznikov (born 1981), former acting Head of the Donetsk People's Republic from 31 August 2018 until 7 September 2018
- Aleksei Uvarov (born 1981), Russian professional footballer
- Yekaterina Kibalo (born 1982), Russian swimmer
- Sergei Bendz (born 1983), Russian professional footballer
- Emine Dzhaparova (born 1983), Crimean Tatar-Ukrainian journalist, editor, television presenter, and politician
- Nikita Khokhlov (born 1983), Kazakh football midfielder
- Oleg Grams (born 1984), Russian handball player
- Oleg Skopintsev (born 1984), Russian handball player
- Irina Bliznova (born 1986), Russian handball player
- Vladimir Ostroushko (born 1986), Russian rugby union player
- Valery Valynin (born 1986), Russian cyclist
- Inna Zhukova (born 1986), rhythmic gymnast
- Vladlena Bobrovnikova (born 1987), Russian handball player
- Ilya Ezhov (born 1987), ice hockey goaltender, Gagarin Cup champion
- Olga Panova (born 1987), Russian tennis player
- Tatyana Chernova (born 1988), Russian heptathlon athlete
- Yevgeny Ovsiyenko (born 1988), Russian professional footballer
- Andrei Vasyanovich (born 1988), Russian professional footballer
- Vitali Dyakov (born 1989), Russian professional footballer
- Vasiliy Kondratenko (born 1989), Russian bobsledder
- Artur Maloyan (born 1989), Russian professional footballer of Armenian ethnic origin
- Alexandra Panova (born 1989), Russian tennis player
- Olesia Romasenko (born 1990), Russian sprint canoeist
- Anna Sen (born 1990), Russian handball player

==== 1991–2000 ====
- Viacheslav Krasilnikov (born 1991), Russian beach volleyball player
- Vyacheslav Mikhaylevsky (born 1991), Russian rower
- Yuri Nesterenko (born 1991), Russian professional football player
- Arsen Beglaryan (born 1993), Armenian football player
- Ilya Polikutin (born 1994), Russian football player
- Danil Prutsev (born 2000), Russian football player

=== 21st century ===
- Ivan Repyakh (born 2001), Russian football player

== Lived in Krasnodar ==
- Fyodor Shcherbachenko (born 1962), Russian professional football coach and a former player
- Alexander Moskalenko (born 1969), Russian gymnast and Olympic champion
- Boris Savchenko (born 1986), Russian chess grandmaster

== See also ==
- List of Russian people
- List of Russian-language poets
