= Vladimir Grig =

Russian painter

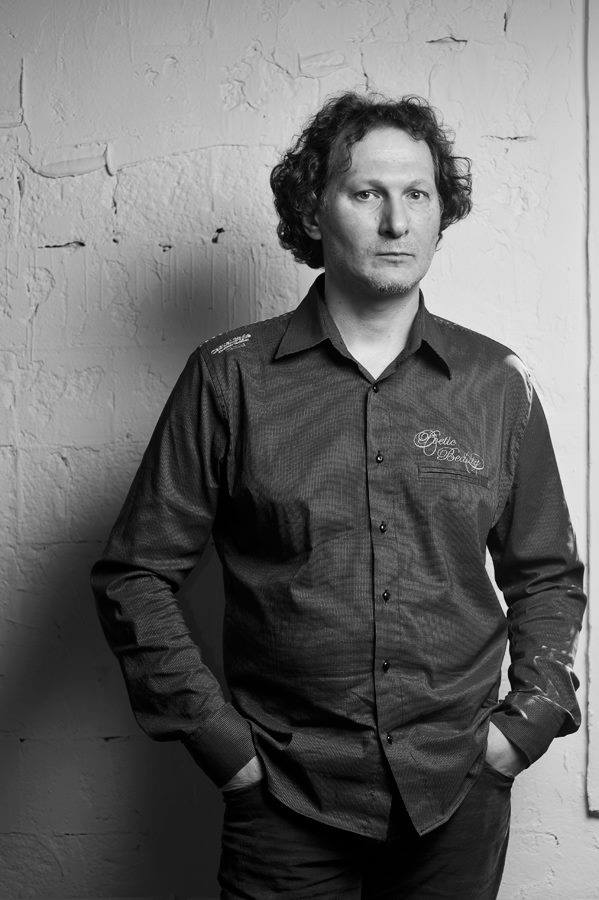
- Born: 21 March 1962 (age 64); Krasnodar, USSR
- Education: Krasnodar Art College
- Known for: sculpture, drawing, science art
- Website: www.vladimirgrig.com

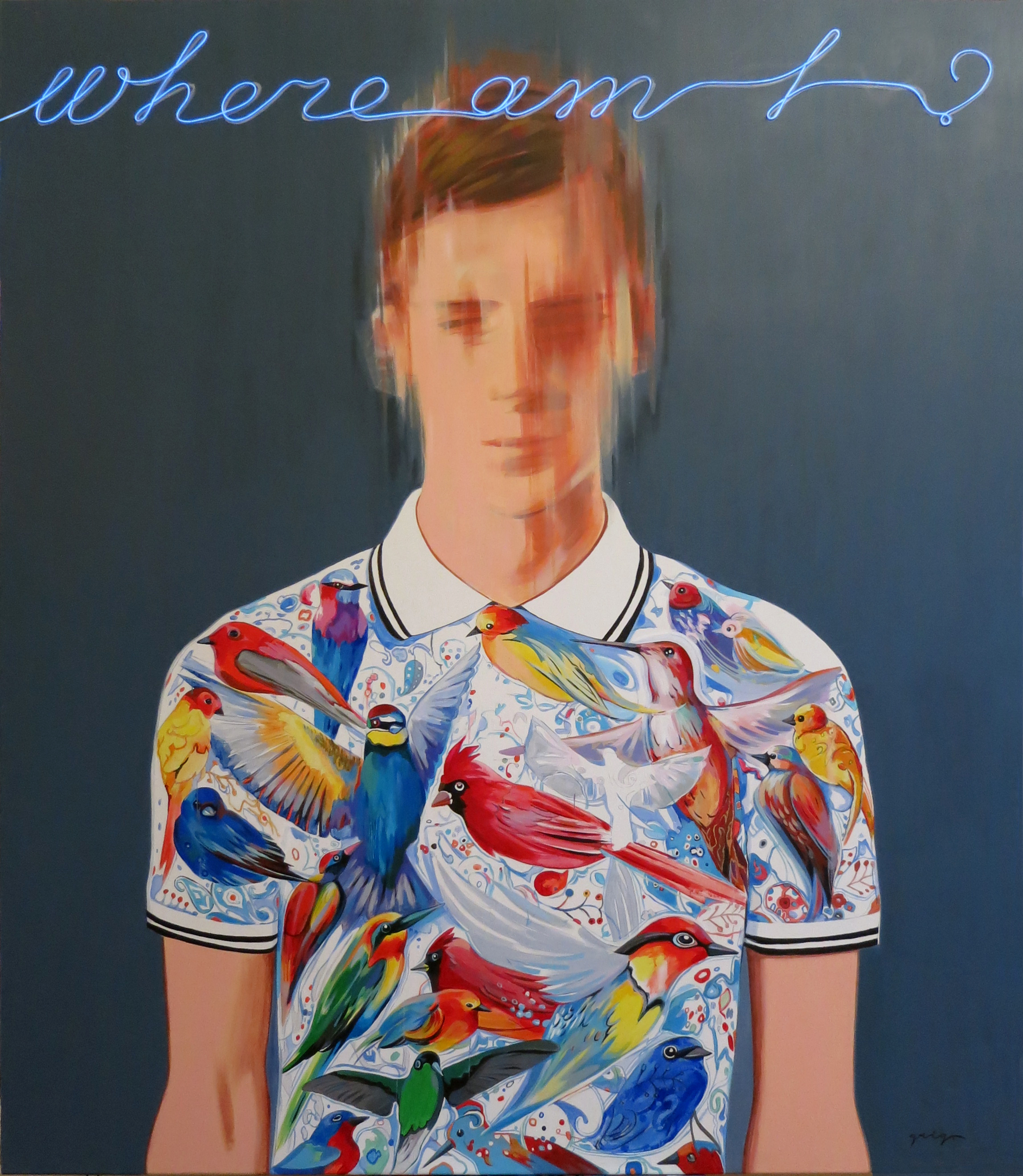
Where am I?, acrylic on canvas, 2012

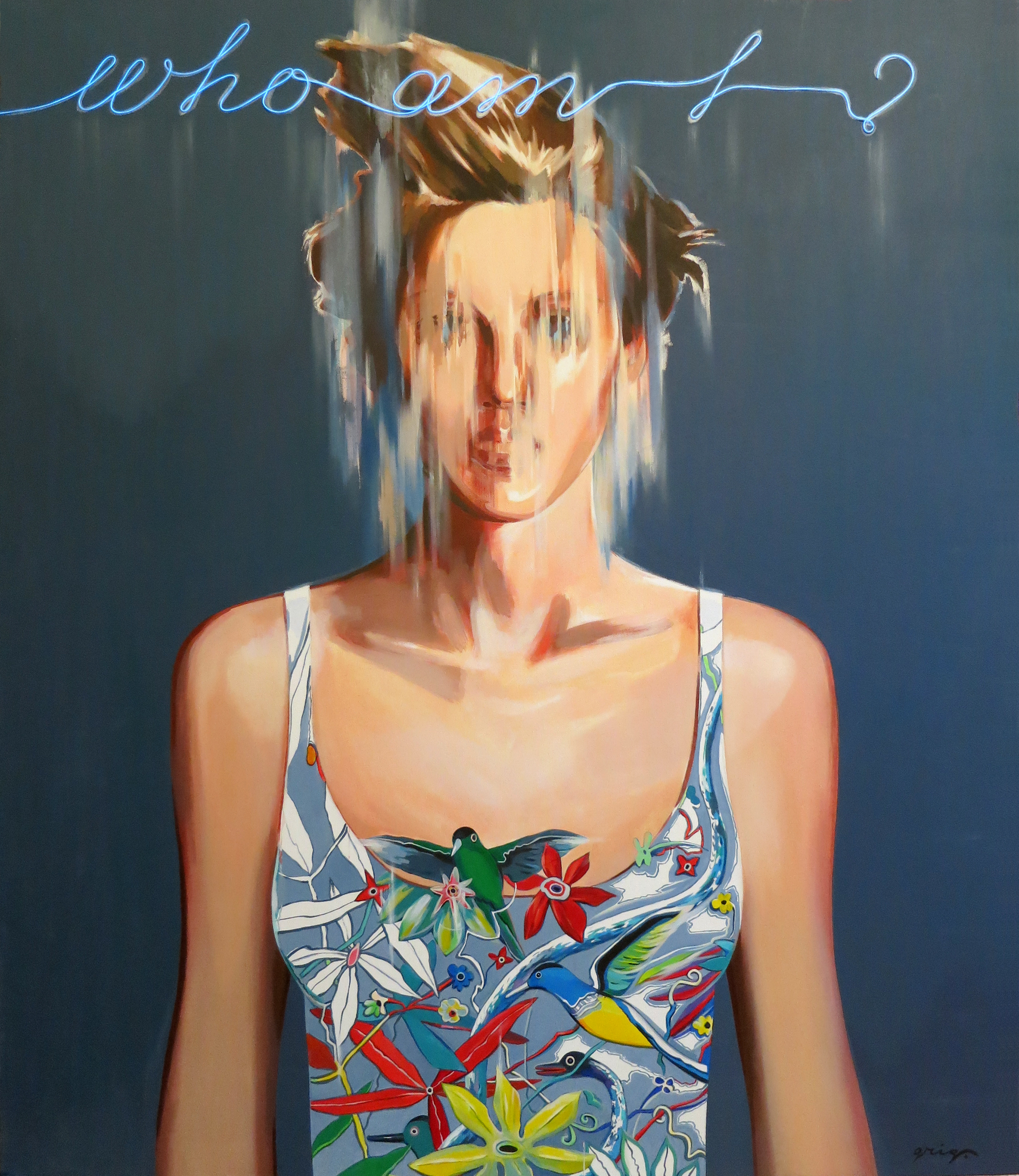
Who am I?, acrylic on canvas, 2012

Vladimir Grig (Russian: Владимир Григ; born 21 March 1962 in Krasnodar, USSR) is the pen name of Russian, St. Petersburg-based artist and musician Vladimir Grigorashchenko.

== Biography ==
=== Art ===
Born in Krasnodar in 1962, Vladimir Grig graduated from Krasnodar Art College in 1987. He started his career as an illustrator in publishing houses and was soon accepted into USSR Union of Artists in 1990. Vladimir's first exhibitions took place in Krasnodar in 1992 and Heidelberg, Germany in 1993, followed by exhibitions in Saint-Petersburg, Moscow, and Sochi, Russia, as well as exhibitions in exhibitions in Germany and Austria.

He took part in the 4th Biennale of Graphic Art in Krasnodar in 1994, the 4th International St.Petersburg Spatia Nova Biennale in 1996, Russian Days in Germany in 2003, the Baltic States Biennale of Graphic Art in 2008. Vladimir participated in numerous Moscow art fairs between 2004 and 2013. His art project entitled Dimensionen was exhibited as part of the 55th Venice Biennale parallel programme.

Vladimir Grig is best known for his science art installations at Dokuchaev Central Soil Science Museum in St. Petersburg in 2008 and 2009 and at the Winzavod Contemporary Art Centre in Moscow in 2011. His 2009 Underground Kingdom project in collaboration with Soil Museum and his installation at the Winzavod Centre during the Life: Science Version festival were created with support of Dmitry Zimin's Dynasty Foundation.

Grig's works are present in the collections of the State Russian Museum, Kovalenko Art Museum in Krasnodar, Dokuchaev Central Soil Science Museum, St. Petersburg PRO ARTE Foundation for Culture and Arts, Kaliningrad State Art Gallery, Krasnodar Central Exhibition Hall, Russian National Library and Universidad Michoacana de San Nicolás de Hidalgo in Mexico.

=== Music ===
Vladimir performs as a vocalist and guitarist in an improvisation band Melonoise.

== Awards ==
Grig's works have been awarded in Russia and Germany. In 1993 and 1999, he received Krasnodar art institutions' awards. In 1995, Nocturne Final III won him a scholarship of the Berlin Academy of Arts. His Underground Kingdom project received a Dynasty Foundation prize in 2009. Vladimir is also a 2011 Kuryokhin Prize and 2012 Kandinsky Prize nominee.

== Style ==
It is agreed upon that Vladimir Grig's individual style originates from the Soviet print design of the 1950s-1960s. Vladimir's manner of work is also considered relevant to Moscow Conceptualists of the 1970s.

== Notable exhibitions ==
- 2019 COSMOSCOW artfair, Gridchinhall Gallery booth
- 2018 Looking for a modern style, Russian Museum, Marble Palace, St. Petersburg.
- 2017 Arrived, Gridchinhall gallery, Moscow region
- 2017 Contemporary art fair SAM FAIR, Street art Museum, St. Petersburg.
- 2012-2017 Participation in projects of St.Petersburg Improvisers Orchestra, St. Petersburg.
- 2017 Project «Heroic Cantata for crickets with orchestra-II", Dokuchaev Museum of Soil science St. Petersburg (together with the St. Petersburg improvisation Orchestra)
- 2016 Auction: PHILLIPS: NEW NOWLONDON AUCTION - 13 rooms
- 2016 Museum of contemporary art PERMM - Actual Drawing
- 2015 “Who am I? Where am I?” Gridchinhall gallery, Moscow region.
- 2014 Actual drawing. Russian Museum, Marble Palace, St.Petersburg
- 2014 Vladimir Grig to Samuel Beckett. Experimental sound gallery, St.Petersburg
- 2014 Russia is doing itself. VDNKh, Moscow
- 2014 Project Cantata heroic, Crickets with Orchestra, Soil science Museum, St.Petersburg
- 2013 Art Moscow 2013
- 2013 Biennale of graphics of the Baltic Sea Kaliningrad – Königsberg 2013
- 2013 New Russian realism. Central House of Artist, Moscow
- 2013 Project Dimensionen – II. ALGallery, St.Petersburg
- 2012 Project Disappearing. East gallery, Moscow
- 2012 Exhibition of the Kandinsky Prize nominees. Udarnik movie theater, Moscow
- 2012 Project Game, Exhibition of the Kuryokhin Prize nominees. St.Petersburg
- 2010 Project Game. East gallery, Moscow
- 2009 Project Transition. East gallery, Moscow
- 2009 Project Underworld. Soil science Museum, St.Petersburg
- 2008 Project Strip cartoon. East gallery, Moscow
- 2006 Project Absolute happiness 60s. Moscow

== Links ==
- Works on Gridchinhall
- Works on Vimeo
