= Yevgenii Vasilevich Zolotov =

Soviet mathematician (1922–1990)

Evgeniy Zolotov
- Born: 29 April 1922; Tula, USSR
- Died: 26 July 1990 (aged 68); Khabarovsk, USSR
- Occupation: Mathematician
- Awards: Order of Friendship (1988)

Academic background
- Education: Moscow State University
- Thesis: (1962)

Evgeniy Vasiljevich Zolotov (29 April 1922 – 26 July 1990) was a Soviet mathematician and a member of the Soviet Academy of Sciences (1987).

== Biography ==
Zolotov was born in Tula (USSR) on 29 April 1922. He was educated in MSU from 1939–1942 up to conscripted to the F. E. Dzerzhinsky Artillery Academy, which was completed in 1944 with the engineering degree.

After getting his degree he served in the Research Institute of the Academy of Flak Forces, which was relocated from Moscow into Yevpatoria. In 1962 he defended his thesis for his doctor’s dissertation for the first time in the institute. With his work Zolotov could contribute to a great extent to create and develop the anti-rocket aircraft defence of the country. In 1968 he was demobilized as Colonel Engineer.

Zolotov did his scientific work at the Technical University in Kalinin (1968–1970). He established here the Department of "Automatic System of Management" and headed it along the University career.

In 1970 Zolotov was invited to the Far-East Scientific Centre of the Soviet Academy of Sciences to create and develop the physical, mathematical and technical profile of the scientific research institutions in that region. Also in this year he was elected a corresponding member of the Soviet Academy of Sciences. Between 1970 and 1972 he directed the Division for Applied Mathematics at Khabarovsk Research Institute of the Far-East Scientific Centre of the Soviet Academy of Sciences. From 1972 to 1980, Zolotov was Vice-president of the Presidium of the Far-East Scientific Centre of the Soviet Academy of Sciences.

In 1981, Zolotov became the director of the Computing Centre of the Far-East Scientific Centre of the Soviet Academy of Sciences, which was established by him in Khabarovsk. At the same time he was elected a member of the Presidium of the Far-East Scientific Centre of the Soviet Academy of Sciences and also President of the Scientific Council for Physics-Mathematics and Technology of the Far-East Scientific Centre of the Soviet Academy of Sciences. On this position he invited to the Far-East Scientific Centre of the Soviet Academy of Sciences academician Veniamin Myasnikov who has stand the Director of IACP.

In Khabarovsk, Zolotov gathered a special research team around himself from researchers of Eastern medicines, such as Physicians, Biophysicists, system analysts and programmers. From 1986, after he had created a medical laboratory (it was managed by V. A. Jonicevski, Professor of traditional Chinese Medicine, Candidate of Medicine), the scientists of the Computing Centre started to do research in the area of socio-cultural, medical-ecological and historical-geographical processes in the Far-East.

In 1987 Zolotov was elected a Member of the Soviet Academy of Sciences.

He died at 68 on 26 July 1990 in Moscow and was buried in Tver at Dmitrovo-Cherkassk cemetery.

== Main research fields ==
- Computer simulation
- System effectiveness estimation
- Applied Methods of Stochastic process

== Awards ==
He was awarded with 'Peoples Friendship' Order.

== Interesting life facts ==
- While he was leading the 2nd Research Institute of the Soviet Flak Forces, where the designing office was working, too, Zolotov, together with A. SZ. Popovic, first rank captain and an enthusiastic group, was building a special ship with his own hands. On the Day of the Navy the ship was rushing along the Volga river as fast as an express train.
- Evgeniy Zolotov became interested in paranormal abilities and had been experimenting with telepathy. He even authored a draft of a university textbook titled Telepathy.

== Family ==
- Wife - Gogol Varvara Dmitrijevna
- Daughter - Olga Evegniyevna Zolotova
- Son - Boris Evegniyevich Zolotov, Ph.D.

== Memory ==
Annual Physics-mathematician young scientists Seminar in Russian Far-East is dedicated to E.V.Zolotov.

== Links ==
- Evgeniy Vasiljevich Zolotov, Academician, on official website of the Far-East Division of the Russian Academy of Sciences
