= Veniamin Myasnikov =

Soviet mathematician, mechanician (1936–2004)

- Born: 4 December 1936; Moscow, USSR
- Died: 29 February 2004 (aged 67); Moscow, Russia
- Awards: Order of Honour (1997)

Academic background
- Education: Moscow State University
- Thesis: (1969)

Veniamin Petrovich Myasnikov (Russian: Вениамин Петрович Мясников; 4 December 1936 — 29 February 2004) was a Soviet mathematician, mechanician and a member of the Russian Academy of Sciences (1992).

== Biography ==
Veniamin Myasnikov was born in Moscow (USSR) in 1936. He was educated in MSU (Mechanics-Mathematics Division), which was completed in 1959.

He established the Department of the Computational Mechanics in the MSU Faculty of Mechanics and Mathematics and headed it in 1998-2000 yy.

After of Yevgenii Zolotov recommendation Myasnikov lived to Vladivostok and was elected as Director of IACP of the Far-Eastern Branch of the Soviet Academy of Sciences (1988-2004).

In 1992 Myasnikov was elected a Member of the Russian Academy of Sciences.

== Main research fields ==
- Fluid dynamics
- Mathematical theory of plasticity
- Geomechanics

== Family life ==
Veniamin Myasnikov died of cancer in Moscow at 67 on the leap day of 2004 and buried at Vostryakovskoe cemetery. He is survived by his wife Svetlana Grigorievna and two children, daughter Anna and son. His father Peter Veniaminovich Myasnikov and mother Varvara Akimovna Myasnikova were graduated in MSU, where the father further was a professor of the "Analytical mechanics" Department.

== Awards and honours ==
Veniamin Myasnikov was appointed an Order of Honour in 1997 for achievements in scientific research resulting in significant Russian scientific and technological advantage in mechanics and technology.

Honorary Professor of MSU (2000).

== Bibliography ==
- Мясников В. П., Фадеев В. Е. Гидродинамические модели эволюции планет земной группы. — М.: Наука, 1979. — 231 с. (rus)
- Мосолов П. П., Мясников В. П. «Механика жесткопластических сред» — М. Наука, 1981 (rus)
- Мясников В. П., Гордин В. М., Михайлов В. О., Новиков В. Л., Сазонов Ю. В. Геомеханические модели как основа комплексной историко-генетической интерпретации геофизических данных. // В кн.: Методика комплексного изучения тектоносферы (под ред. В. В. Белоусова). — М.: Радио и связь, 1984. — с. 99-110.(rus)
- В. П. Маслов, В. П. Мясников, В. Г. Данилов. Математическое моделирование аварийного блока Чернобыльской АЭС. — М.: Наука, Глав. ред. физико-математической лит-ры, 1988.(rus)
- Myasnikov V.P., Guzev M.A. Thermo-mechanical model of elastic-plastic materials with defect structures. Theoretical and Applied Fracture Mechanics. 2000, V. 33, p. 165-171
- Myasnikov V.P., Guzev M.A., Ushakov A.A. Self-equilibrated stress fields in a continues medium. Journal of Applied Mechanics and Technical Physics. 2004, V. 45, N 4, p. 558-566
