= Vasily Lobanov =

Russian composer and pianist

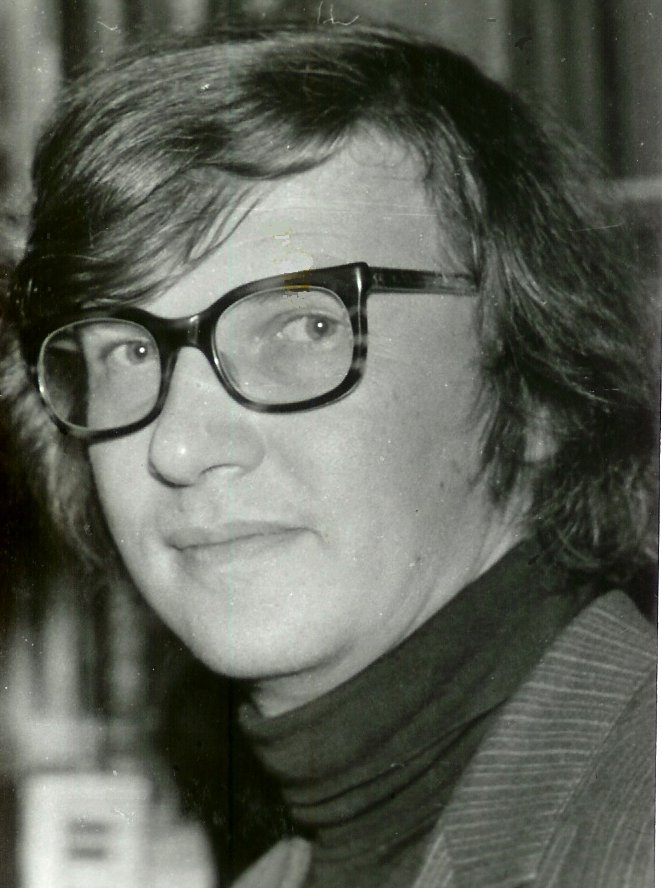
Vasily Lobanov

Vasily Pavlovich Lobanov (Васи́лий Па́влович Лоба́нов, born 2 January 1947) is a Russian composer and pianist. He has been a Duo-Partner of Sviatoslav Richter.

== Biography ==
Vasily Pavlovich Lobanov was born in Moscow. He studied piano with Heinrich Neuhaus and Lev Naumov and composition with Sergey Balasanian and Alfred Schnittke.

== Selected works ==
=== Operas ===
- Antigone, opera after Sophocles, Op. 51 (1985–1987)
- Father Sergius (Отец Сергий – Otets Sergiy), opera in one act after the story by Leo Tolstoy (1990–1995)

=== Oratories and cantatas ===
- Lieutenant Schmidt, oratorio, Op. 31 (1979)
- God-Nightingale, cantata after Osip Mandelstam for baritone and chamber ensemble, Op. 61 (1991)

=== Orchestral music ===
- Aria for violin and string orchestra (1986)
- Chamber Symphony, Op. 92 ("Painters"), (2018)
- Concerto for cello and orchestra, Op. 42 (1984–1985)
- Concerto No.1 for piano and chamber orchestra, Op. 35 (1981)
- Concerto for trumpet, percussion and string orchestra, Op. 70 (1997)
- Concerto No.1 for viola and string orchestra, Op. 53 (1989)
- Concerto No.2 for viola and string orchestra, Op. 71 (1998)
- Double Concerto for clarinet, violin and chamber orchestra, Op. 65 (1995)
- Sinfonietta for chamber orchestra, Op. 47 (1986)
- Symphony for strings, percussion, flute and trumpet, Op. 22 (1977)

=== Chamber music ===
- 2 Pieces for Flute solo, Op. 24 (1978)
- 7 Pieces for Cello and Piano, Op. 25 (1978)
- Piano Quartet, Op. 68 (1996)
- Sonata for Clarinet and Piano, Op. 45 (1985)
- Sonata for Flute and Piano, Op. 38 (1983)
- Sonata No. 2 for Cello and Piano, Op. 54 (1989)
- Sonata "In 6 Fragments" for Violin and Piano, Op. 56 (1989)
- Sonata for Viola and Piano, Op. 58 (1990)
- Sonata No. 2 for Piano, Op. 33; (1980)
- String Quartet No. 4, Op. 49 (1987–88)
- String Quartet No. 5, Op. 50 (1986–88)
- String Quartet No. 6 (2004)
- Trio for Flute, Clarinet and Bassoon, Op. 29 (1979)
