= Alexander Tselyakov =

Alexander Tselyakov (born 1954) is a Russian-Canadian classical concert pianist and educator.

Alexander Tselyakov was born in Baku, Azerbaijan and made his professional début as soloist with the Azerbaijan State Symphony Orchestra in his native Soviet Union at the age of nine. He went on to study at the Moscow Tchaikovsky Conservatory with Lev Naumov and Sergei Dorensky. He has performed as guest soloist with many orchestras including the Moscow Philharmonic Orchestra, Saint Petersburg Philharmonic Orchestra, Tokyo Philharmonic Orchestra, Tchaikovsky Symphony Orchestra of Moscow Radio, Warsaw Philharmonic Orchestra and Toronto Symphony Orchestra. Alexander Tselyakov has won prizes at the VIIIth International Tchaikovsky Competition in Moscow (1986), the Second International Music Competition of Japan, Tokyo (1983) and New Orleans International Piano Competition (1995).

Alexander Tselyakov is Professor of Piano at the Brandon University in Canada. He is the Artistic Director of the Pender Harbour Chamber Music Festival, British Columbia, and the Clear Lake Chamber Music Festival, Manitoba, Canada.
