= Oleg Khvostov =

Russian painter

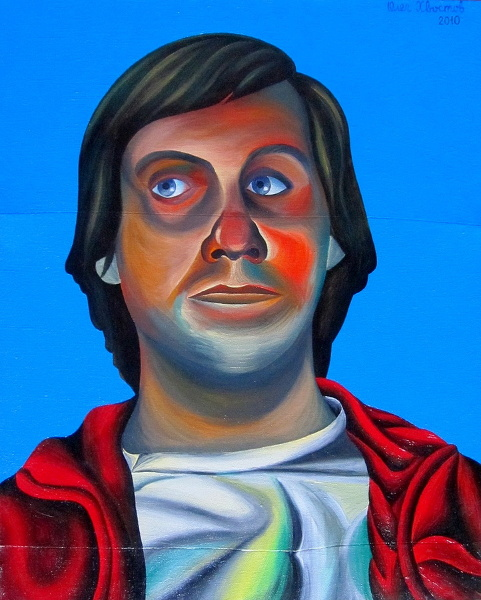
- Self-portrait, 2010
- Born: October 19, 1972 (age 53); Leningrad, USSR
- Known for: Painting
- Website: olegkhvostov.com

Oleg Khvostov (born 19 October 1972) is a Russian painter, representative of naïve art. Since 2001 he's a member of the Russian Union of Artists and the Free Culture society since 2004. Currently lives and works in Saint Petersburg.

== Biography ==
=== Early years ===
Oleg Khvostov was born in Leningrad in 1972 and spent his early years on Narodnaya street, in Vesely Poselok district. His school-time passion for doodling and drawing caricatures of his classmates and teachers later on grew into keen interest in painting when one of his classmates, fascinated with the hippie culture, introduced Oleg to Nicholas Roerich's art. Thereafter Khvostov began to attend an educational studio on Ligovsky prospect and got a more thorough understanding of classical Russian art and works of Ilya Repin, Ivan Shishkin, Ivan Kramskoi.

After graduating from school Khvostov served in the Northern Fleet (in Soviet times known as Red Banner Northern Fleet.) He was lucky enough to serve in Fleet's headquarters in Severomorsk, Murmansk Oblast, where administration paid special attention to the navy men's cultural entertainment. It was in the fleet's fine arts studio where he saw works of Pablo Picasso, Henri Matisse, Aleksander Rodchenko and found out about modernism and Russian avant-garde for the first time. On return from the service in 1993 Oleg went on attending a fine arts studio in Saint Petersburg and pre-entry course of the Faculty of Architecture in the Saint Petersburg Repin Academy of Arts, but decided to choose real-life experience over getting a degree in Arts.

=== Early career, 1993 — 1997 ===
In the early 1990s Khvostov saw the artists at Ostrovsky square as the new image of artistic freedom. He moved to a squat on Konstantina Zaslonova street and it became his first studio. Among distinguishing features of Khvostov early works were processing of themes and artistic devices in consecutive stages and experiments with materials. For the Color schemes series he had been painting different geometric objects’ planes by a particular algorithm for 1.5 year in order to master his techniques. Oleg started teaching himself how to draw self-portraits and used to finish several in a single day. In the following years this series has gradually risen to several thousands of paintings. Artistic revision of the famous paintings in Khvostov's own technique was another part of self-education.

In 1997 Oleg showed the photos of his works to the Boray gallery curators in Saint Petersburg and they featured them in the gallery's summer exhibition. His paintings draw attention of the local celebrities – Vladimir Kozin and Vadim Flyagin from the artistic group The New Stupid.

=== The New stupid, 1998 – 2001 ===
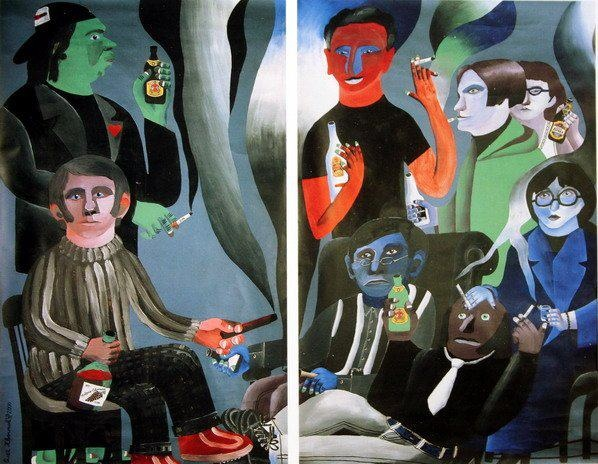
Group portrait of "the New Stupid" art group, paper, tempera, collage, 2000

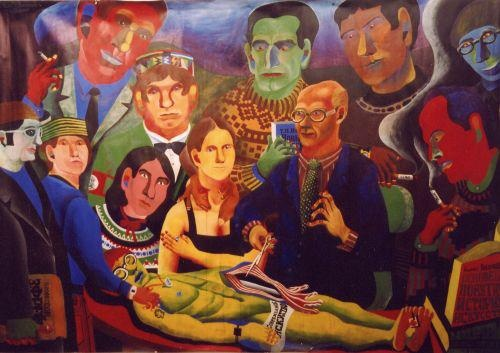
The Anatomy lesson, paper, acryl, 2000

They met in person a little later and in 1998 Khvostov joined "the New stupid" art group. "The New Stupid" followed the principles of an early futurism and Dadaism and favoured action art and performance art over painting, sculpture and installation art. Oleg participated in numerous art projects and continued to do painting, for his primitive artistic style was in accord with the ideas of this art group.

The fame of "The New Stupid" gave the artist more prominence in the art community. Through "the New Stupid" Khvostov got acquainted with fine art experts Gleb Ershov and Andrei Klyukanov who at that moment worked in Navicula Artis gallery. In 1999 they organized his first solo exhibition "Self-portraits — 200+1", which consisted of only a part of the artist's series. In 2000 Khvostov shifted to the large format and started to use emulsion paint and paper. The New Stupid society leader, Vadim Flyagin, became his first model. Then there was a comic series "Curators’ portraits" representing notable art critics of Saint Petersburg and galleries’ staff. These works led to Khvorostov getting an order to paint a multi-figured portrait for the anniversary of the "Leningrad Art Critics Club", founded by Ivan Chechot. For this portrait the artist took as a basis the renowned painting The Anatomy Lesson of Dr. Nicolaes Tulp by Rembrandt. He illustrated a figurative dead body as a "body of art" prosected by Chechot and his students.

In 2001 Khvostov and "The New Stupid" parted ways. Oleg left the group in the rank of the ‘honorary member’ and focused on painting.

=== Saint Petersburg, 2000 – 2005 ===
In the early 2000s Khvostov developed his own technique – he used piles of carton boxes acting as a divisible canvas. His first series on carton boxes was exhibited in September 2000 in the Pushkinskaya 10 Art Centre. This project, named "Memorial of leaders", included portraits of Leonid Brezhnev, Adolf Hitler, Vladimir Lenin, Marilyn Monroe, Peter the Great, Joseph Stalin, Ayatollah Khomeini, Jesus Christ, Mao Zedong and Ernesto Che Guevara with Vladimir Putin being the pivotal figure of the series.

"Memorial of Leaders" was highly valued within the art community. First of all, Khvostov was awarded with the honorary prize "Propylaeum" by the "New art world" magazine and the "Artist of the year 2000" title. Second, at the exhibition in the Museum of Non-conformist Art the "Memorial" attracted attention of the Moscow art dealer Marat Guelman, who devised to present a special project of Saint Petersburg artists at the annual "Art Moscow" fair.

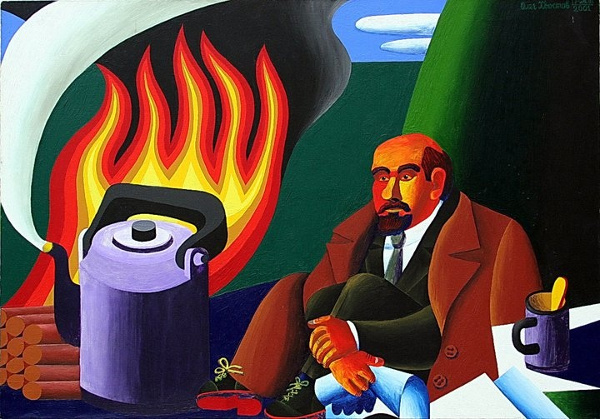
Lenin in the Underground, acryl, canvas, 2001

In May, 2001 Khvostov finished working on the "New Leniniana" series in which he illustrated the revolutionary leader as a character of the folk art. In his absurd Leniniana the artist played with the scenes of Isaak Brodsky, Arkady Rylov and Kukryniksy by making Napoleon Bonaparte, Stalin, Hitler, robotic Venus de Milo, Rome imperor Nero, Titanic and himself its main characters. The "New Leniniana" was presented for the first time at the exhibition organized by "Navicula Artis" gallery and Pushkinskaya 10 Art Centre in the Razliv Lenin Museum.

In 2003 Khvostov won a grant from the Pro Arte Foundation for Culture and Arts to create an exhibition project in The State Museum of the History of St. Petersburg. His works became a part of the "Passport" display that was a part of the "Shtuchki" exhibition project. It was organized by the fund and the museum upon an initiative of the historic Lev Lurie and with support of the Ford Foundation. Its aim was to introduce citizens to daily necessities of the past, provided by different Saint Petersburg museums, by locating them in the same display area along with contemporary art objects. At the March exhibition three official documents from different eras were presented: 1838 residence permit for living in Saint Petersburg, citizeness Sokolova's passport issued in 1939, and a passport from 1904. For this "Passport" project Olge Khvostov painted 3 portraits of their owners based on the descriptions given.

Since January 2000 to January 2001 he continued working on the series of his self-portraits for the new exhibition, organized by Aleksander Florensky in the Mitki Art Centre. Though it was named "1000 self-portraits", the artist presented an additional painting to Dmitry Shagin to include it in the gallery's collection. By 2003 the number of Khvostov's self-portraits grew up to 3000 and the Borey gallery commemorated the exhibition to the 300 years anniversary of Saint Petersburg. In 2005 some of the Khvastov's self-portraits were included in the "Human portrait" display, presented by the National Centre for Contemporary Arts within the 1st Moscow Biennnale of Contemporary Art special program.

Apart from that, in 2001 Oleg Khvostov took part in Biennale of Contemporary Art in Tirana, organized by Giancarlo Politi, the ‘Flash Art’ magazine publisher, and art critic Helena Kontova.

=== Collaboration with Marat Guelman Gallery, 2005 — 2006 ===
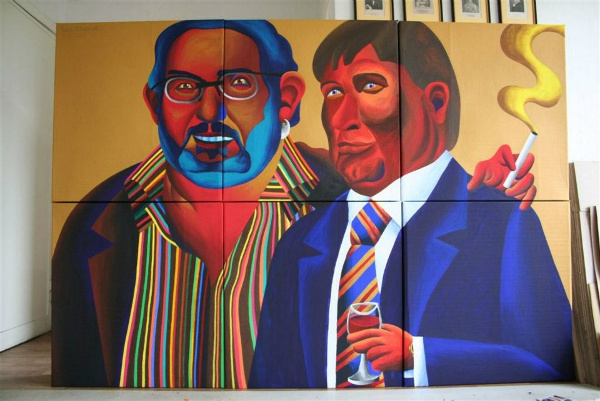
Guelman and Bondarenko, tempera, acryl, carton boxes, 2006

Oleg Khvostov got acquainted with Marat Guelman after the "Memorial of Leaders" exhibition, signed a contract with his Gallery and moved to Moscow. During his collaboration with the Guelman Gallery Khvostov took part in the "Piterskiye" project at the "Art Moscow" fair in 2005 and got a grant from the Marat Guelman Contemporary Art Funding Agency. In a year spent in his Moscow studio the artist completed two projects: a grand-scale model of the Moscow Kremlin made of carton boxes and an artistic revision of the "Venus of Urbino" by Tiziano, also painted on the carton boxes and potentially divided into blocks. However, the exhibition in Marat Guelman's Gallery wasn't held and in 2006 Oleg came back to Saint Petersburg.

In January, 2007 the "Venus" by Khvostov became a part of the "Thaw" exhibition in the State Russian Museum Marble Palace. The exhibition dedicated to the 15th anniversary of the Marat Guelman Gallery was a continuation of the permanent exposition of 70 paintings by contemporary Russian artists that Guelman donated to the museum in 2001.

=== Collaboration with Gridchinhall, 2009 – 2012 ===
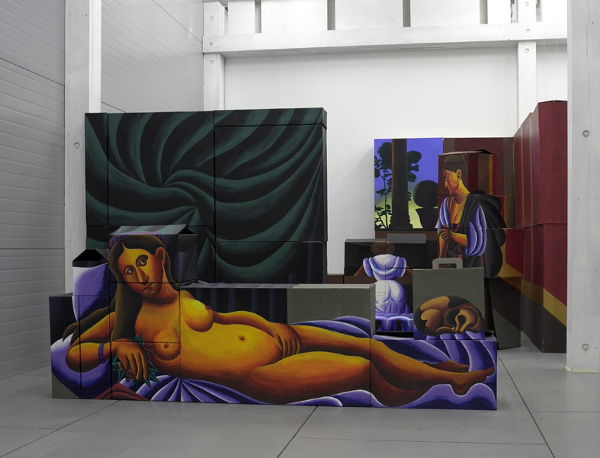
The Venus of Urbino (after Tiziano), installation, carton boxes, acryl, 2006

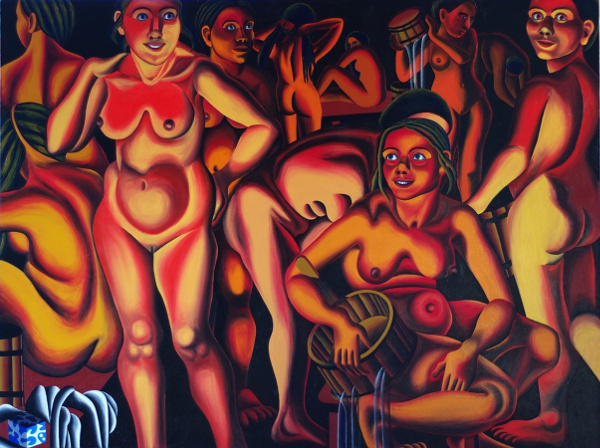
Banya (after "Banya" by Zinaida Serebryakova), canvas, oil, 2010

Three year later Khvostov accepted the invitation of the art dealer and art collector Sergey Gridchin and moved to Moscow again. He resided in the Gridchinhall art residence and for almost a year worked on a new art project. In December, 2010 Oleg presented his exhibition called "Absolute painting" that included both Kremlin and Venus, created during his work with Guelman, along with some new works. As the artist was inspired by the landscapes that surrounded the residence area rural scenery became the central theme of the exhibition. It also included around 40 artistic interpretations of classical paintings from Leonardo da Vinci and Tiziano Vecellio to Julien Dupré, Orest Kiprensky and Zinaida Serebryakova. By that time Khvostov's individual artistic style as a naïve artist had fully developed. Moreover, during this time period an image of a cow enters the artist's visual language as he saw them close for the first time while swimming in the ponds near the residence.

In summer 2011 Khvostov and Gridchin handed the carton Kremlin to the TV Rain channel. This installation served as a film set for the "Ministry of Culture" program. It was also planned to be included in the Moscow Museum of Modern Art collection.

During the lawsuit against punk-rock band Pussy Riot in 2012 Khvostov, along with other people of art and culture, spoke in support of its members. He signed an open letter in support of the Pussy Riot members and against government imposing certain perceptions of modern art and participated in the travelling exhibition ‘Party Riot Bus’. He painted a portrait of Nadezhda Tolokonnikova on cardboard that was later included in multipage album ‘Art at the barricades’ presented at the Moscow Contemporary Art Center Winzavod in August, 2012.

=== Saint Petersburg, 2012 – 2015 ===
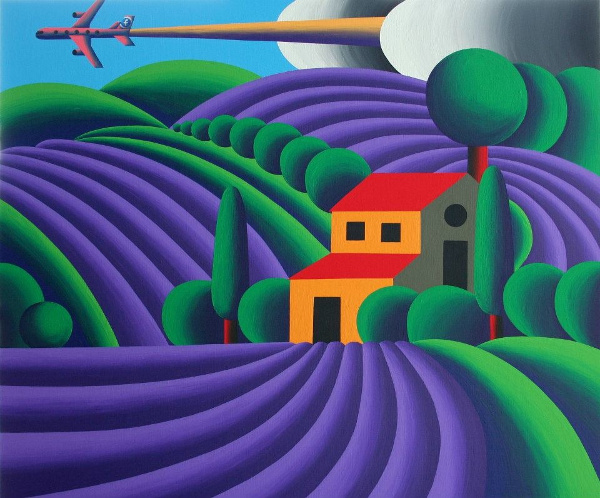
Provence Landscape, canvas, acryl, 2012

On return from Gridchinhall Khvostov rented a studio on the territory of an ex-factory "Red triangle" and started working on his new series of landscapes. On February, 14 in 2013 he presented his new works in the "Lust" series at the exhibition in the AL Gallery. After a year Khvostov finally managed to organize an exhibition at Marat Guelman's: the same series of landscapes but with the different idea was exhibited in the "Cultural Alliance" gallery in the Art Center Winzavod under an ironic name "Lavandos", an allusion to Provance lavender fields and Russian criminal argot In October, 2013 Khvostov's paintings were presented at SWAB Barcelona, International contemporary art fair, in November – became a part of the AL Gallery's stand at the art fair Contemporary Istanbul 2013. In February, 2014 his "New Leniniana" series was repeatedly exhibited in Razliv for the jubilee exhibition "90", commemorated to Vladimir Lenin's memorial day. On the exhibition closing day the artist handed all eight works of the series to the Razliv Lenin Museum. The next Khvostov's exhibition is planned in Gridchinhall for December, 2015 and January, 2016. It is going to include his latest works, painted in 2014-2015х.

== Artistic style ==
Let me take this opportunity to say, that I still consider him one of the most interesting artists of Saint Petersburg and it’s sad that we couldn’t work it out back in the day

— Marat Guelman

All the researchers of Khvostov's works emphasize the role of self-education in the development of his own artistic style. Dmitry Pilikin, an artist, curator, vice director of SPbSU Diaghilev Museum of modern art, and Andrei Kovalev, art critic, fine arts expert and lecturer at the Faculty of Arts of the Moscow State University, agree that the lack of artistic education saved Khvostov's works from the formal attributes of genre and need to follow the canons of art.

Khvostov used the following material for copying — The Nude Maja by Francisco Goya, Venus of Urbino by Tiziano, Sleeping Venus by Giorgione, Sistine Madonna by Raphael Sanzio, The Expulsion from the Garden of Eden by Masaccio, The Flight into Egypt by Rembrandt, The Rape of Europa by Claude Lorrain, Grove of Ship Timber by Ivan Shishkin, Poor Liza by Orest Kiprensky, Dmitry Levitsky’s portraits, Music by Henri Matisse and Black Square by Kazimir Malevich. This choice was also specifically emphasized by Ekaterina Andreeva, leading research associate of the State Russian Museum Department of the new wave, art critic and curator, characterizing Khvostov as an "absurdist primitivist painter of the hermitage museum culture". She believes that it was an inheritance of traditions of the Leningrad necrorealism of the 1980s that brought along a harmonious cooperation of Khvostov and others from "the New Stupid" both art groups grew from the "New artists" movement.

No, it’s not difficult to find a model, but it’s easier to draw yourself. You yourself are the most disciplined and untiring sitter. Narrow bounds allow to focus on a single object, investigate his psychology

— Oleg Khvostov, interview for "Bohemian Petersburg" magazine

Portraits and self-portraits and lavender landscapes, borrowed from impressionists and postimpressionists, hold a special place among cross-cutting themes of Khvostov's art works. Stanislav Savistsky (art critic, curator, lecturer of the Saint Petersburg State University Faculty of Liberal Arts and Sciences) in his "Absolute painting" exhibition review pinpointed some patterns of Khvostov's portraiture. In his remakes of classical works and ultimate series of self-portraits the art expert traced a commonness of geometric forms, which led him to the conclusion that any of Khvostov's portraits actually, to a varying degree, is a self-portrait – a way of searching for the artist's self-identity. Among Khvostov's portraits Pilikin emphasized his taste for illustrating political leaders, public men, people of religion and mass art as another cross-cutting theme, for the artist considers them to represent the spirit of his times.

In her interview for the online-journal "Bohemian Petersburg" poet and artist Irina Dudina named some specifics of Oleg's works the following way: blue and green faces, Peterburg-style elegant primitivism and quite pushy avant-garde. Anton Uspensky, leading research associate of the State Russian Museum Department of the new wave, compared Khvostov's style to the basic Adobe Photoshop tool — gradient, by the means of which he fills canvas with various geometric forms. Pilikin also added planes and cows to the list of important elements of the artist's visual language, which appeared in his works after the year spent in Gridchinhall. Sometimes cows become the main characters of his paintings, sometimes they are not more than a part of the scenery.

== Selected exhibitions ==
=== Solo exhibitions ===
- 1999 — Self portraits — 200+1, Navicula Artis Gallery, St. Petersburg
- 2000 — Full-length Painting — Pushkinskaya 10 Art Centre, St. Petersburg
- 2000 — Leader`s Memorial — Pushkinskaya 10 Art Centre, St. Petersburg
- 2001 — 1000 self-portraits — Mitky Art Centre, St. Petersburg
- 2001–2002 — The New Leniniana — Razliv Lenin Museum, Leningrad region
- 2003 — 3000 self-portraits — Borey Gallery, St. Petersburg
- 2004 — One portrait: the making of — Mitky Art Centre, St. Petersburg
- 2004 — The Call of the Wild — Insterburg Fortress historical and cultural center, Chernyakhovsk, Kaliningrad region
- 2004 — I was born with love for art — Navicula Artis Gallery, St. Petersburg
- 2007 — Oleg Khvostov Painting — Asa-Art Gallery of Arts, St. Petersburg
- 2010 — Landscape instinct — National Centre for Contemporary Arts, St. Petersburg
- 2010 — Absolute painting — Gridchinhall, Moscow
- 2013 — Lust — AL Gallery, St. Petersburg
- 2014 — Lavandos — "Cultural Alliance", Marat Guelman's Project. Winzavod. Moscow

=== Group exhibitions ===
- 2000 — New Petersburg Expressionism — Museum of Non-conformist Art, St. Petersburg
- 2001 — Biennale of Contemporary Art in Tirana — Tirana, Albania
- 2002 — Давай! Davaj — Postfuhramt, Berlin, MAK Museum, Vienna
- 2003 — Passport — Pro-Arte Institute, St. Petersburg
- 2005 — 1st Moscow Biennnale of Contemporary Art — Central House of Artists, Moscow
- 2005 — From Petersburg — non-commercial project by M. Guelman at Art Moscow Art Fair, Central House of Artists, Moscow
- 2005 — Face Portrait — M`ARS Centre for Contemporary Arts, Moscow
- 2006 — Collage in Russia - 20th century — State Russian Museum, St. Petersburg
- 2006 — Presentation of Marat Guelman's Contemporary art funding agency, ARTPLAY Design centre, Moscow
- 2007 — Thaw — State Russian Museum, St. Petersburg
- 2009 — Lenin from A to Z — Museum of Political History of Russia, St. Petersburg
- 2009 — Stalin — Museum of Political History of Russia, St. Petersburg
- 2009 — Khrushchev+Brezhnev+... — Museum of Political History of Russia, St. Petersburg
- 2009 — Art about Art — State Russian Museum, St. Petersburg
- 2009 — Russian Beauty — National Centre for Contemporary Arts, Moscow and Red triangle Art Centre, St. Petersburg
- 2013 — Navicula Artis 1992—2012. Found in St. Petersburg — Kultprosvet gallery, Moscow

=== Collections and auctions ===
Oleg Khvostov's works are included in the collections of Marat Guelman's Gallery, Gridchinhall and many private collections. Paintings from the collection of Omsk businessman Oleg Usachev have been exhibited in Barnaul, Krasnoyarsk, Novokuznetsk, Novosibirsk, Omsk, Tomsk, Tyumen, Ufa and other Siberian cities within the "Personal history" exhibition in 2012–2013. Paintings from the series "Absolute painting" and "Lust" were brought to the hammer at the Russian auction Vladey. Among other public deals are sales from the "Gridchinhall" stand at the Art Space Event Fair.

== Notes ==
=== Works cited ===
- Catalog of works by Oleg Khvostov - an overview of creativity from 1999 to 2015 with illustrations. Moscow: ScanRus. 2015.
  - Andreeva, Ekaterina. "Oleg Khvostov: art in the BRICS countries". In Khvostov (2015), pp. 7–8.
  - Kovalev, Andrey. "The Dashing 90s and the “New Blockheads”". In Khvostov (2015), p. 56.
  - Pilikin, Dmitry. "Oleg Khvostov: from under the boulders". In Khvostov (2015), pp. 9–13.

== Additional links ==
- Oleg Khvostov's Personal Website
- Oleg Khvostov on Gridchinall Website
