= Lev Naumov =

Russian classical pianist, composer and educator

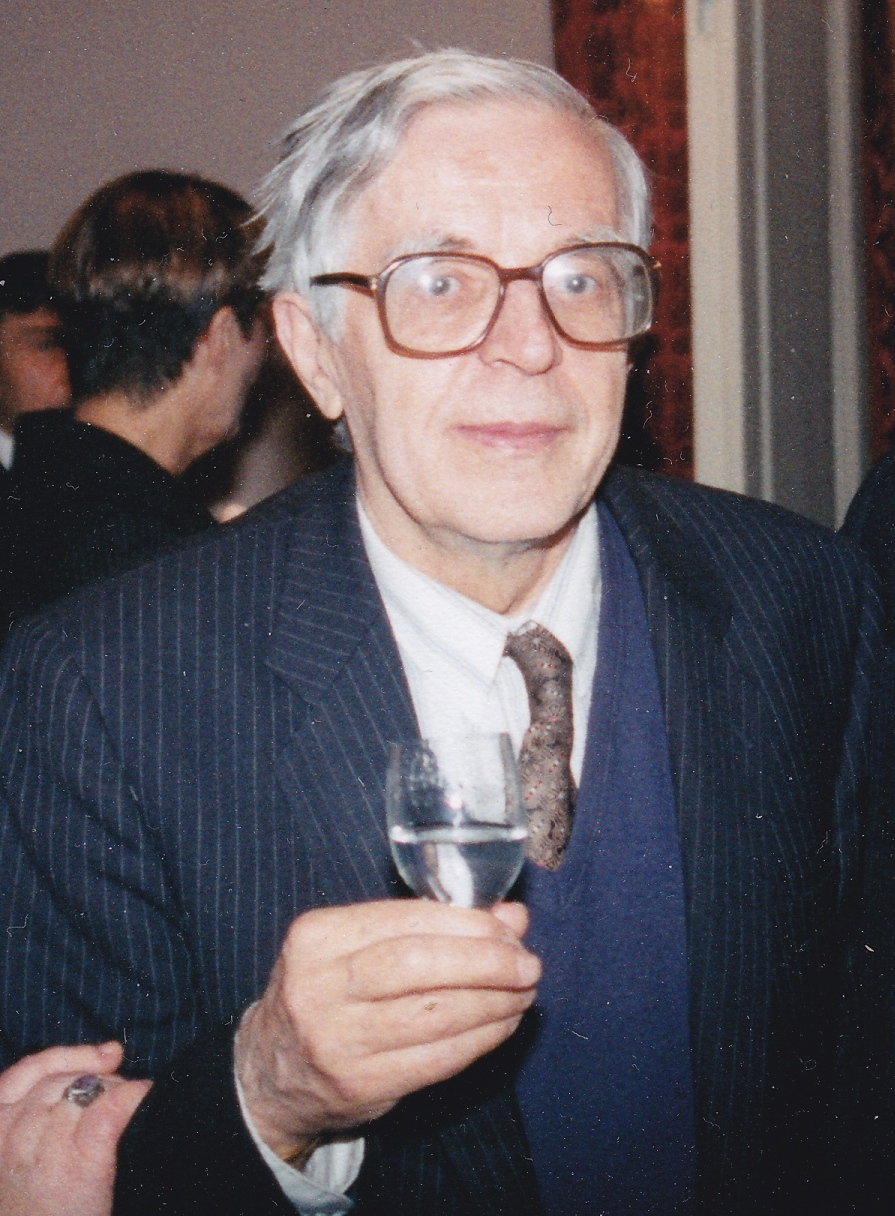

Lev Nikolayevich Naumov (Russian: Лев Никола́евич Нау́мов; 12 February 1925, Rostov – 21 August 2005, Moscow) was a Russian classical pianist, composer and educator. Received a title of People's Artist of Russia and was nicknamed the "Godfather of the Russian piano school".

Professor Naumov studied with the legendary Heinrich Neuhaus, becoming his assistant and eventually his successor. Naumov was a professor of piano at the Moscow Tchaikovsky Conservatory and a jury member in many international competitions. Professor Naumov's studio produced some of the better-known pianists to emerge from Russia in the past 40 years. Among his students at different times were such pianists as Sergey Arzibaschev, Ksenia Bashmet, Vladimir Viardo, Irina Vinogradova, Maria Voskresenskaya, Andrei Gavrilov, Dmitri Galynin, Pavel Gintov, Nairi Grigorian, Andrey Diev, Peter Dmitriev, Pavel Dombrovsky, Violetta Egorova, Victor Eresko, Andrej Hoteev, Ilya Itin, Stanislav Khegai, Alexander Kobrin, Daniil Kopylov, Alexey Kudryashov, Sviatoslav Lips, Dong-Hyek Lim, Vassily Lobanov, Alexei Lubimov, Anna Malikova, Alexander Melnikov, Alexei Nasedkin, Natalia Naumowa, Kadzuki Nisimon, Dmitry Onishenko, Valery Petach, Boris Petrushansky, Juri Rosum, Konstantin Scherbakov, Ivan Sokolov, Vladimir Soultanov, Alexei Sultanov, Sergey Tarasov, Alexander Toradze, Alexander Tschaikowski, Alexander Tselyakov, Rem Urasin, Andrei Yeh, Artemis H.R. Yen and many others.
