= Nairi Grigorian =

Spanish pianist of Armenian origin

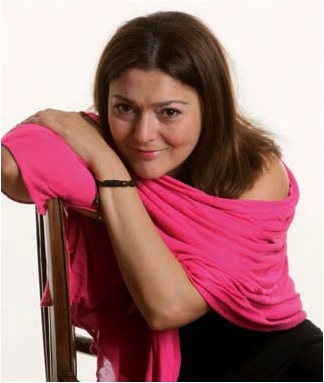
Nairí Grigorián Avakimov

Nairí Grigorián Avakimov is a Spanish pianist of Armenian origin who has resided in Zaragoza since 1991. She began her studies of piano at five years of age, under the direction of Yegorova, who also was professor of Bella Davidovich.

When she was 7 years old, Nairi entered the Central Special Music School of the Moscow Conservatory, having Vladimir Bunin as her professor. In this stage, she studied with Lev Naumov, Nelly Eguiazarova and Flier. When she was 17 years old, she finished her examinations with Prize of Honor, interpreting the Concert for piano and orchestra, Op. 23 of P. I. Tchaikovsky and the Symphonic Studies of Robert Schumann, among other works.

In addition, her work is pedagogical and is recognized by the number of international prizes obtained by her students: now more than 137. In 2002, she received the Gold Medal of the Ministry of Culture of Italy for her educational work and interpretation, and made an extensive activity like member of jury in international contests.

Nairi was a member of the International of Piano Camillo Togni in Brescia from 2002 to 2005. During the months of August 2003 and August 2004, she was the personal assistant to professor Aquiles Delle Vigne in the Festival Mozarteum International in Salzburg.
