= Vladimir Soultanov =

Uzbekistani pianist

Vladimir Soultanov (born 1960) is an Uzbekistani pianist.

== Early life ==
Soultanov was born to a family of musicians in Tashkent. When he was only four years old he took his first piano lessons and by the age of six he was enrolled in the Central Music School. Four years later he became a star in a Soviet made documentary and five years later continued his education at one of the Centrale Graduate Schools under guidance from Evgeny Timakin. In 1980 he was a participant in the cultural program at the 1980 Summer Olympics and then was awarded his degree from the Moscow Conservatory where his teacher was Lev Nikolaevitch Naumov.

== Career ==
After graduation Soultanov gave concerts in the capital cities of Belarus, Kyrgyzstan, Russia, Ukraine, and his native Uzbekistan. He also played in cities such as Bukhara, Gorky, Samarkand, and Saratov. In 1988, he emigrated to France where he became a professor at the Conservatoire d'Arras following by becoming a professor at Conservatoire de Roubaix as well twenty years later. Currently he appears at various festivals and on television programs in Belgium, Germany, France, Hungary, Japan and Poland and has recorded numerous CDs of Mozart and Chopin sonatas which were dedicated to such German composers as Franz Liszt and Franz Schumann as well as Russian Mily Balakirev, Modest Mussorgsky, Sergei Rachmaninoff, and other well known composers of classical music such as Edvard Grieg and Chopin.
