= Gridchinhall =

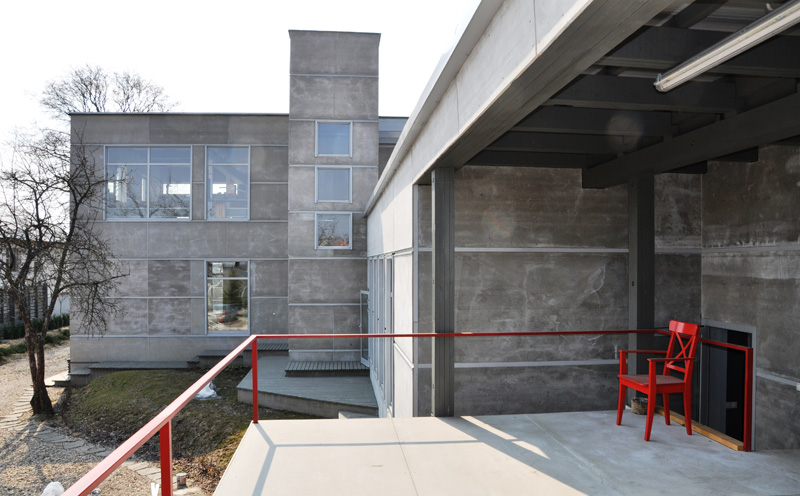
- The Gridchinhall building
- Established: 2009
- Location: Dmitrovskoye, Krasnogorsky District, Moscow Oblast, Russia
- Coordinates: 55.755°N 37.122°E
- Type: Art Gallery
- Director: Sergey Gridchin
- Website: Gridchinhall.com

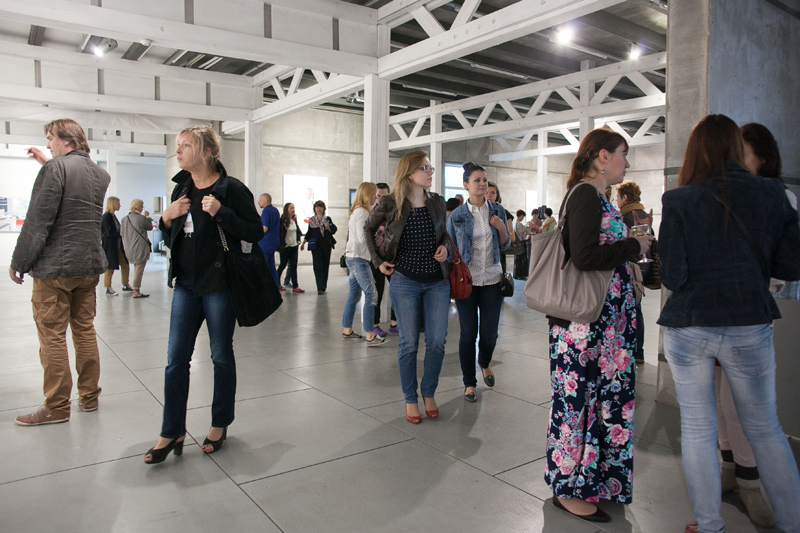
Exhibition in Gridchinhall

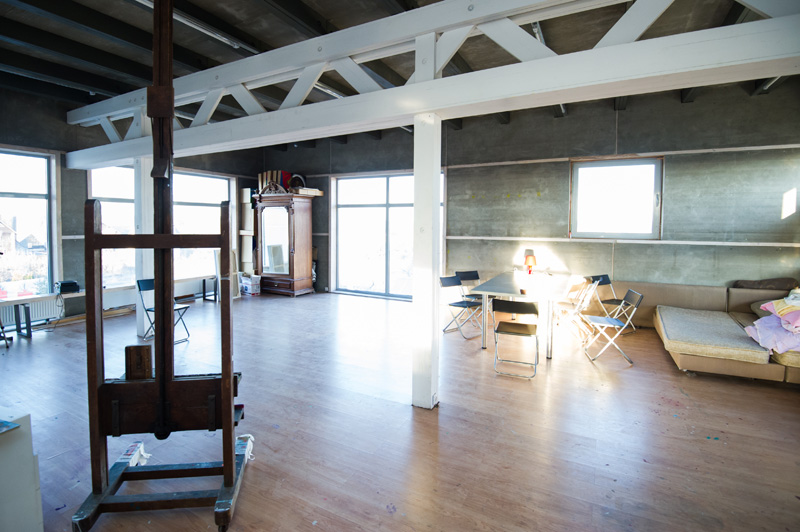
Gridchinhall's workshop

Gridchinhall (Russian: Гридчинхолл) — is an arts centre and a private gallery of contemporary and modern art, one of the first Russian art residences. Founded by entrepreneur and art collector Sergei Gridchin, Gridchinhall focuses on the development of original projects created on the premises of the residence or in collaboration with the art centre.

Gridchinhall was opened on 19 September 2009 on Gridchin's plot of land in the village near Moscow. The building of the exhibition hall was built as per the design of Sergei Gridchin with the participation of professional architects; several changes were made to the project during the construction stage. At the time of opening, Gridchinhall was the largest exhibition hall of contemporary art in Moscow Oblast.

== Activities ==
According to the founder, Gridchinhall's archetype was formed by the image of suburban offices of architectural workshops and old merchant houses, on the ground floor of which there used to be little shops. At Gridchinhall, living space is combined with exhibition areas and workspace. Gridchinhall's office is located in an old hut with five walls, moved to the plot of land during the construction of the art centre.

Gridchinhall exhibits and sells works of both aspiring and established artists. The art centre offers artists a workshop to live and work, and completed artworks establish the basis for personal and collective exhibitions. Some works remain in the permanent exhibition of the art centre.

Gridchinhall is also engaged in educational and cultural activities. The art centre hosts events that unite artists, curators, collectors, and critics as well as offers guided tours for students of creative disciplines.

According to Gridchin, one of the aims of the art centre is education of business approach in artists themselves.

== Exhibitions ==
Several exhibition projects at Gridchinhall saw such guest curators as Mikhail Sidlin, Alexander Evangeli, and Maria Kravtsova. A number of projects created at Gridchinhall were highly appreciated by the art community:

- Kulik's Hair was nominated for Kandinsky Prize, The Last Exhibition by Anna Zhyolud was nominated in the category Visual Artwork at Innovation Contest in 2012.
- Little Red People by Pprofessors were exhibited in Perm on the initiative of Marat Gelman, Director of the Perm Museum of Modern Art, as well as in Saint Petersburg and at Skolkovo School.
- A three-metre tall figure of a man now placed on the roof of Gridchinhall used to be located on the shores of Istra near Ilyinsky Highway. Local authorities and land owners did not express any signs of protest, but three months later, the locals overturned the sculpture with a tractor.
- One item from the Absolute Painting exhibition – the Moscow Kremlin made using cartons – was handed over to Dozhd TV and served as an interior design element at the TV show Ministry of Culture. Later, "the Kremlin" was transferred to the Moscow Museum of Modern Art.

== Artists ==
Solo exhibitions include Stass Shpanin, Pprofessors, Natasha Yudina, Irina Drozd & Ivan Plusch, Dmitry Kavarga, Oleg Khvostov, AES+F, Dmitry Gutov, Anna Zhyolud, Vika Begalska, Nikita Alekseev and others.
