= Mikhail Guzev =

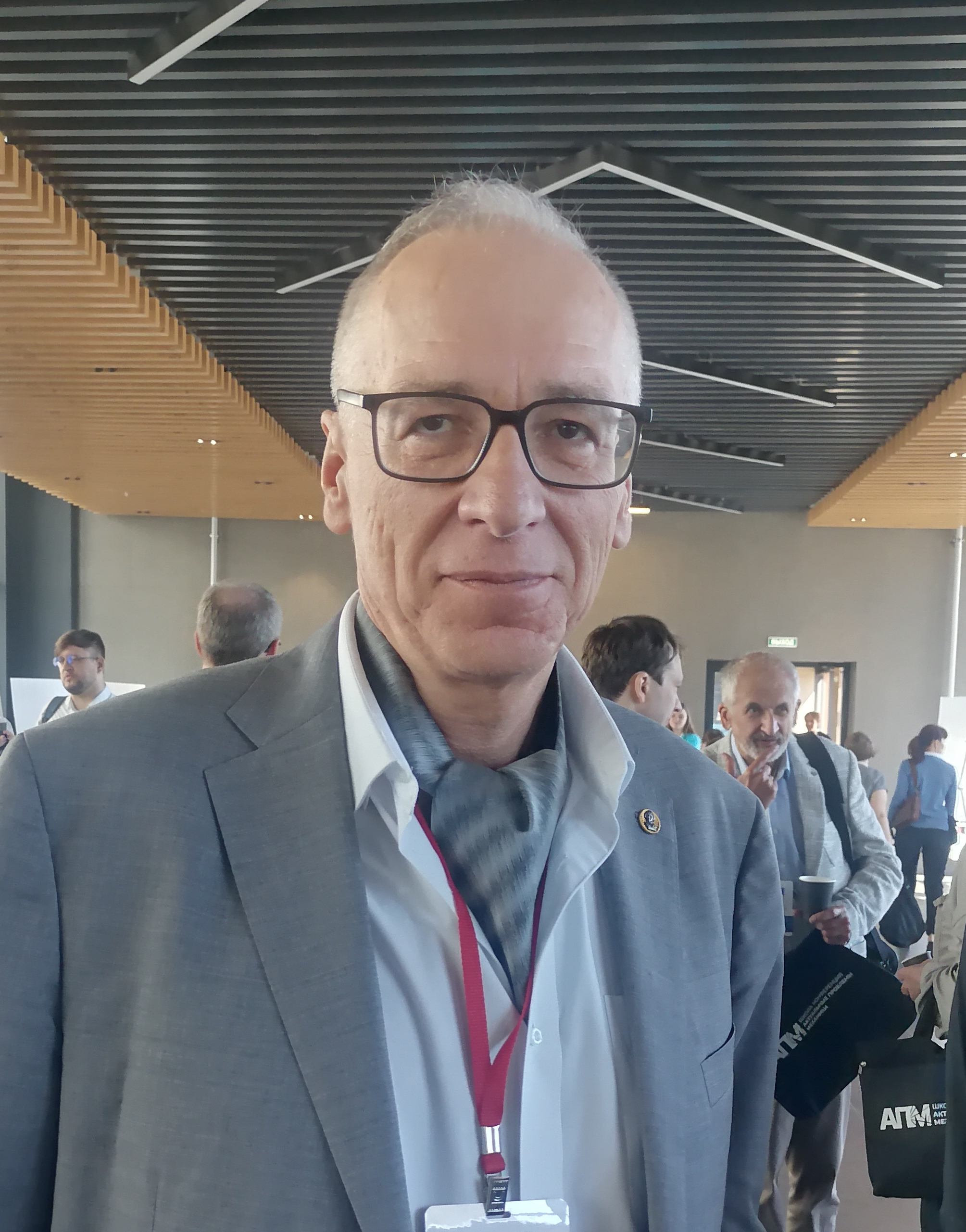
- Mathematician Mechanician
- Born: 6 August 1962; Krasnodar, USSR
- Citizenship: Soviet Union → Russia
- Education: Saint-Petersburg State University

Mikhail Aleksandrovich Guzev (born 6 August 1962) is a Russian mathematician, mechanician and a full member of the Russian Academy of Sciences (RAS) (2016). Director of Institute of Applied Mathematics of Far-Eastern Branch of RAS.

== Biography ==
M.Guzev was born in Krasnodar (USSR) in 1962. He was educated in SPbSU (Faculty of Physics), which was completed in 1984.

Doctor of physical and mathematical sciences (1999).

In 2003 Guzev was elected a corresponding member of the Russian Academy of Sciences.

In 2006 he was elected as a director of Institute of Applied Mathematics of Far-Eastern Branch of RAS.

Elected a full member of Russian Academy of Sciences (2016).

== Main research fields ==
- Mathematical modelling of the elaso-plastic defect materials;
- Geomechanics.

== Bibliography ==
- Myasnikov V.P., Guzev M.A. Thermo-mechanical model of elastic-plastic materials with defect structures. Theoretical and Applied Fracture Mechanics. 2000, V. 33, p. 165-171
- Myasnikov V.P., Guzev M.A., Ushakov A.A. Self-equilibrated stress fields in a continues medium. Journal of Applied Mechanics and Technical Physics. 2004, V. 45, N 4, p. 558-566
- Guzev, M.A., Makarov, V.V. Deforming and failure of the high stressed rocks around openings. Vladivostok: RAS Edit. - 2007. — 231 p. — ISBN 978-5-8044-0795-8 (rus)
- Guzev M. A. Non-Euclidean models of elastoplastic materials with structure defects. - Saarbrücken, Germany: Lambert Academic Publishing. - 2010. - 128 p. - ISBN 9783843373913
- Mikhail A. Guzev Non-classical solutions of a continuum model for rock descriptions. Journal of Rock Mechanics and Geotechnical Engineering, Volume 6, Issue 3, June 2014, Pages 180–185. - https://dx.doi.org/10.1016/j.jrmge.2014.03.001
