= Mikhail Strikhanov =

- Born: July 18, 1952 (65); Krasnodar, Russian Federation
- Education: National Research Nuclear University MEPhI

Mikhail Nikolaevich Strikhanov (Russian: Михаи́л Никола́евич Стриха́нов; born 18 July 1952) is a Russian physicist. Since 2007 he has been the rector of National Research Nuclear University MEPhI (Moscow Engineering Physics Institute).

== Early life and career ==
Mikhail Strikhanov was born on July 18, 1952, in Krasnodar, Russia. In 1974 he graduated from MEPhI, where he studied theoretical nuclear physics. From 1974 to 1997 he worked in MEPhI as an assistant researcher, a senior teacher, associate professor and professor. In 1972–1997 Strikhanov served as Institute's prorector.

== Professional experience ==
In 1998 Mikhail Strikhanov was appointed the Head of R&D Department in the Ministry of Education and Science. In 2003-2004 he served as Deputy Minister of Education of the Russian Federation.

In 2004-2007 he was Deputy Director of Department for Governmental S&T innovative policy of the Ministry of Education and Science of Russia. In 2007 Mikhail Strikhanov was elected rector of MEPhI. He was reelected in 2010 and 2014 (as recommended by MEPhI supervisory board).

Under his governance in 2007 MEPhI becomes one of the winners of the contest among universities applying innovative educational programs organized by Ministry of Education and Science of the Russian Federation. In 2008 MEPhI was transformed into National Research Nuclear University (NRNU MEPhI). In 2013 MEPhI was selected as one of 15 winners of Russian academic excellence project (Project 5-100).

== Awards ==
Laureate of the following Government Awards:

- Award of the Russian Federation Government in the field of science and technology (2009)
- Award of the Russian Federation Government in the field of education (2004, 2010)
- The order "For Merit to the Fatherland", II class (2014)
- The Kurchatov Medal, I class (2012)
- The Medal "In Commemoration of the 850th Anniversary of Moscow" (1997)
- Honoured Worker of Higher Education of the Russian Federation (2001)
- Diploma of Merit, Russian Federation Ministry of Education and Science (2007)
- Diploma of Merit, Ministry of Health and Social Development of the Russian Federation (2009)
- Diploma of Merit, the Presidential Administration of Russia (2014)

== Scientific career ==
The scope of scientific interests includes nuclear physics, radiation material science, physics of nanostructures. Mikhail Strikhanov is a co-author of more than 300 scientific works, author of several monographs. His citation index is 13834, the h-index is 59 (Web of Science, 2015). He is a current head of MEPhI’s research group in STAR experiment (detection of quark-gluon plasma) in Brookhaven National Laboratory of the USA.

Academic degrees:

- PhD of Science (1978)
- Doctor of Physical Science (1992)
- RAE member-correspondent (2012)
- RAE academician (2015).

== Civic, political, and philanthropic activities ==
Mikhail Strikhanov is a chairman of Advisory council on the higher and postgraduate education at committee of the State Duma of Federal Assembly of the Russian Federation, vice-chairman of council on awards of the Government of the Russian Federation in the sphere of education, member of scientific council at Security Council of the Russian Federation.

He serves as vice-chairman of the council of rectors of Moscow and Moscow region, member of the Presidium of the Russian Academy of Education and member of the Presidium of the Higher Attestation Commission.

Mikhail Strikhanov is a member of scientific and technical council of State corporations Rosatom and chairman of the editorial board of the magazine "Nuclear Physics and Engineering".

== Personal life ==
Mikhail Strikhanov is married and has a daughter.
