= Mikhail Voronov =

Russian footballer

Personal information
- Full name: Mikhail Valeryevich Voronov
- Date of birth: 22 September 1976 (age 50)
- Place of birth: Krasnodar, Russian SFSR
- Height: 1.84 m (6 ft 1/2 in)
- Position: Midfielder

Senior career*
Years	Team	Apps	(Gls)
1993–1996	FC Kolos Krasnodar	20	(1)
1993–1995	→ FC Kolos-2 Krasnodar (loans)	41	(1)
1996–1997	FC Rostselmash Rostov-on-Don	10	(0)
1996–1997	→ FC Rostselmash-2 Rostov-on-Don (loans)	25	(1)
1998	FC Vagonnik Krasnodar		
1998	FC Neftyanik Krasnodar		
1999	FC Volgar-Gazprom Astrakhan	31	(1)
2000	FC Lokomotiv-Taym Mineralnye Vody (amateur)		
2000	FC Nemkom Krasnodar (amateur)		
2001	FC Kuban Krasnodar	7	(0)
2002	FC Neftekhimik Nizhnekamsk	27	(2)
2003	FC Kuban Krasnodar	10	(0)
2004	FC Fakel Voronezh	19	(0)
2005	FC Sodovik Sterlitamak	8	(0)
2006	FC Spartak-UGP Anapa	11	(0)
2006	FC Dynamo Stavropol	9	(2)
2007	FC Chernomorets Novorossiysk	13	(0)
2008	FC Dynamo Krasnodar		
2009	FC Pontos Vityazevo		
2010	FC Biolog Novokubansk (amateur)		
- * Club domestic league appearances and goals

Mikhail Valeryevich Voronov (Russian: Михаи́л Валерьевич Во́ронов; born 22 September 1976) is a former Russian football player.

While playing for FC Neftekhimik Nizhnekamsk, Voronov scored two goals during the 2002 Russian First Division season.
