= Ilya Polikutin =

Russian footballer

Personal information
- Full name: Ilya Andreyevich Polikutin
- Date of birth: 11 September 1994 (age 32)
- Place of birth: Krasnodar, Russia
- Height: 1.94 m (6 ft 4 in)
- Position: Defender

Youth career
- FC Kuban Krasnodar
- –2011: FC Krasnodar-2000
- 2011–2012: PFC CSKA Moscow

Senior career*
Years	Team	Apps	(Gls)
2013–2014	FC Afips Afipsky (amateur)		
2014–2015	FC Afips Afipsky	23	(2)
2015	FC Feniks Bolshoy Beysug		
2016	FC Druzhba Maykop	3	(0)
2016–2017	FC Feniks Bolshoy Beysug		
2018	FC Kolos Beloglinsky District		
2018	FC Pioner Leningradskaya		
2019	FC Kuban Krasnodar (amateur)		
2019–2021	FC Kuban Krasnodar	28	(2)
2022	FC Metallurg Lipetsk	11	(0)
2022–2023	FC Kuban-Holding Pavlovskaya	4	(0)
2023	FC Kolos Beloglinsky District		
2023–2024	FC Metallurg Lipetsk	11	(0)
- * Club domestic league appearances and goals as of 11 November 2023

Ilya Andreyevich Polikutin (Russian: Илья Андреевич Поликутин; born 11 September 1994) is a Russian football player.

== Club career ==
He made his debut in the Russian Football National League for FC Kuban Krasnodar on 31 July 2021 in a game against FC Spartak-2 Moscow.
