= Andrei Chuprina =

Russian footballer

Personal information
- Full name: Andrei Vladimirovich Chuprina
- Date of birth: 24 September 1976 (age 50)
- Place of birth: Krasnodar, Russian SFSR
- Height: 1.87 m (6 ft 1 1/2 in)
- Position: Defender

Senior career*
Years	Team	Apps	(Gls)
1994	FC Lada-Yug Krasnodar		
1995–1996	FC Zhemchuzhina Sochi	10	(0)
1995–1996	→ FC Zhemchuzhina-2 Sochi (loans)	31	(5)
1997–1999	FC Volgar-Gazprom Astrakhan	39	(1)
2000	FC Tsentr-R-Kavkaz Krasnodar (amateur)		
2001	FC Angusht Nazran	18	(0)
- * Club domestic league appearances and goals

Andrei Vladimirovich Chuprina (Russian: Андрей Владимирович Чуприна; born 24 September 1976, in Krasnodar) is a former Russian football player.
