= Violetta Egorova =

Russian pianist

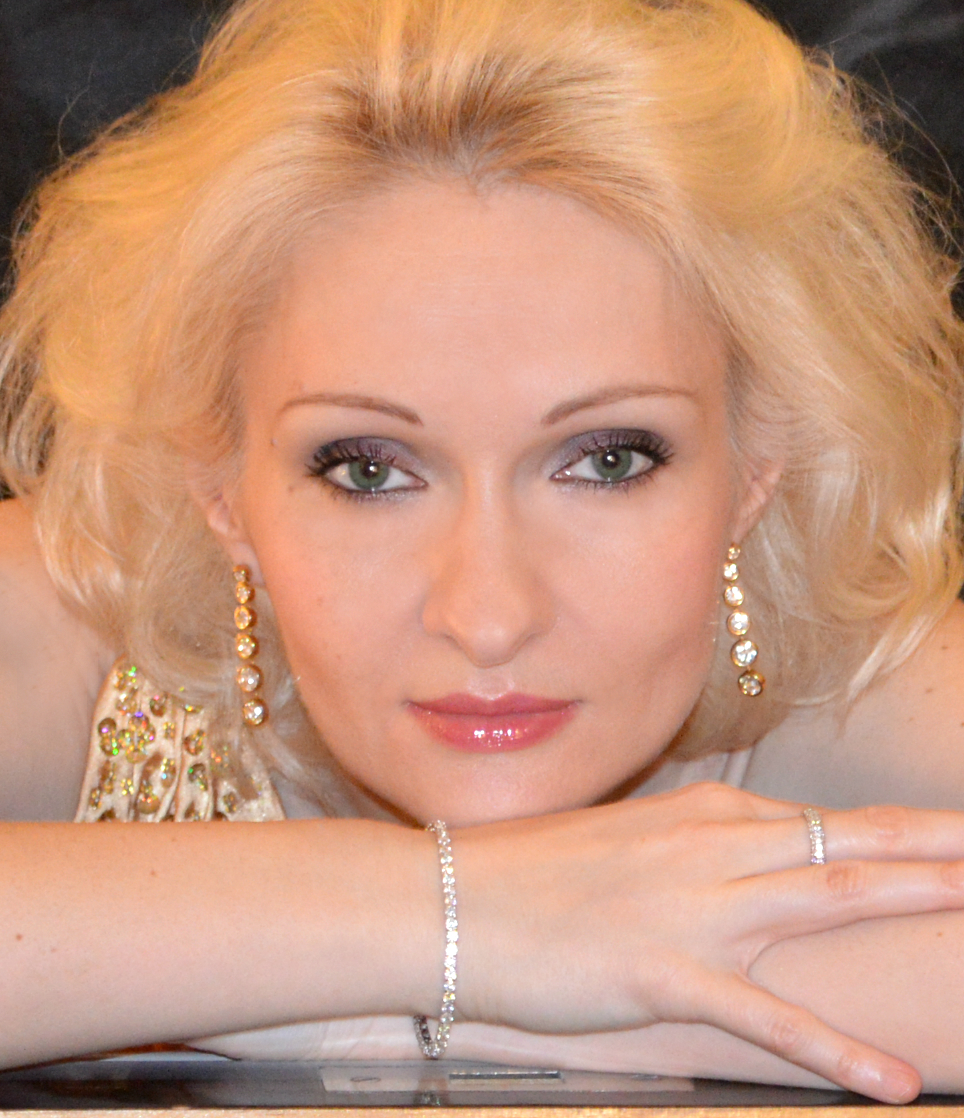

Background information
- Born: November 16, 1969 (age 56); Krasnodar, Russia, USSR
- Genre: Classical
- Occupation: Pianist
- Instrument: Piano
- Website: Official website

Violetta Egorova (Russian: Виолетта Викторовна Егорова) is a Russian concert pianist.

== Biography ==
She was born in Krasnodar on November 16, 1969, a city in the southernmost section of Russia. She began to play and improvise on the piano at the age of four. At the age of six, she made her debut on TV, playing pieces from "The Children's album" by Robert Schumann. Egorova entered the Moscow Central Special Music School for Gifted Children at the age of six, where she studied with A. Artobolevskaya and Alexander Mndoyants. She gave her first solo recital in Moscow, the capital of Russia, at the age of twelve.

Egorova won first place at the Alessandro Casagrande International Piano Competition in Terni, Italy; G. Viotti International Competition, Italy; Gina Bachauer Piano Competition in USA and at many other international competitions. Her early career benefited from working with her great mentor Lev Naumov. Her dedication to the craft fulfilled her mentor's promise, which was to make every note sing. In 1991, while still studying under Professor Lev Nikolaevich Naymov at the Tchaikovsky Moscow State Conservatory, Art and Electronics, a joint Russian-American recording enterprise, honored Ms. Egorovas talent by recording a CD. This CD contained the music of Mozart and Prokofiev in celebration of the anniversary of those two composers' birth. Furthermore, Ms. Egorova has recorded several CDs under various labels, such as Universal Music Group, Teichiku Records, Onepoint.fm, Accademia Pianistica Siciliana and has been featured on radio and television broadcasts in Italy, Turkey, Canada, Egypt, Ecuador, France, and Russia.

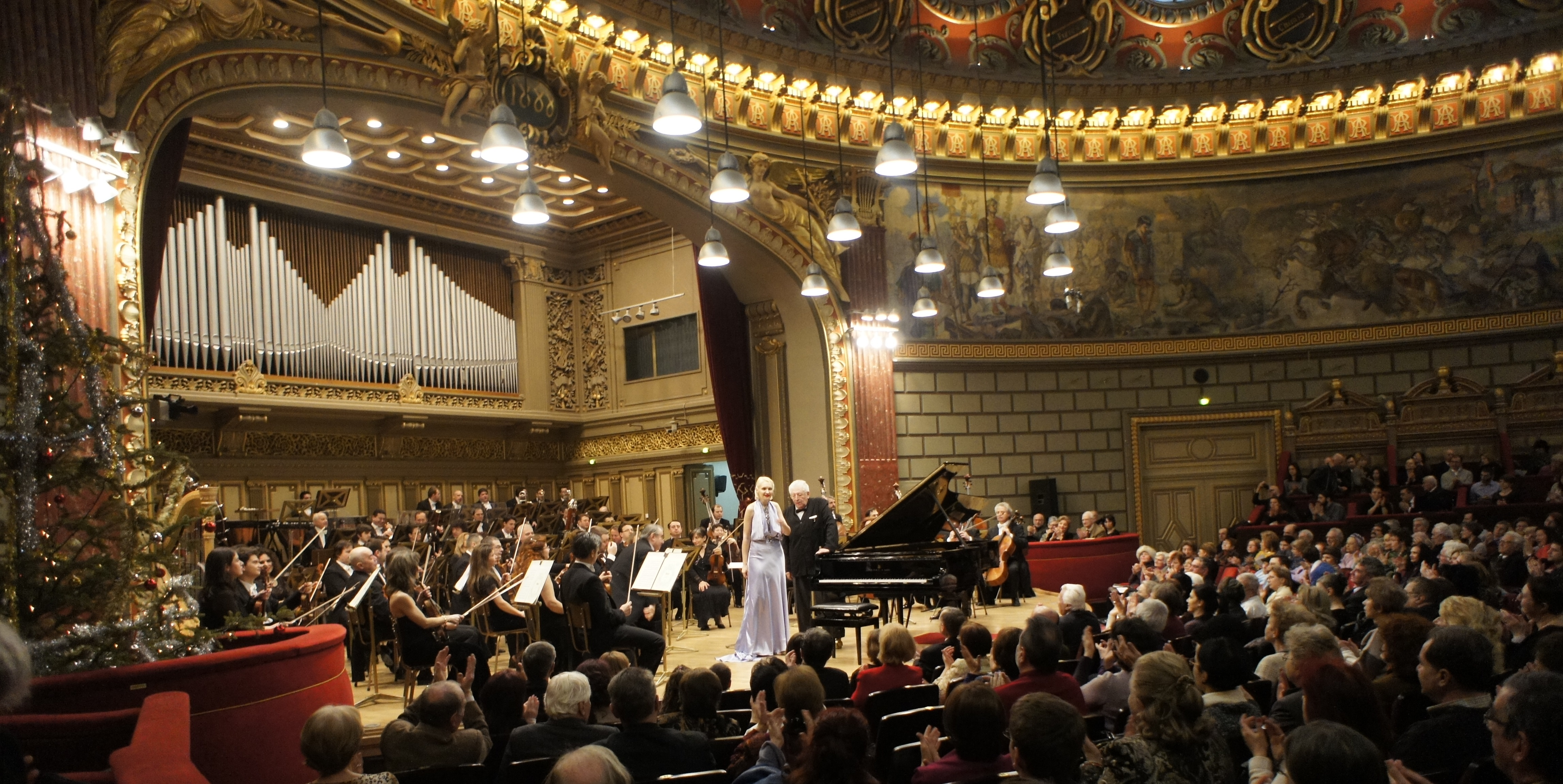
Violetta in concert. Bucharest Phylharmony

Egorova has performed in some of the most famous concert halls in the United States, Italy, France, Switzerland, Turkey, Egypt, Monaco, Romania, Austria, Russia, and China

She is a regular guest artist with many renowned ensembles such as the State Academic Orchestra of Russia, Utah Symphony Orchestra, the Chamber Orchestra Kremlin, Orchestra del Festival Pianistiñî Internazionale di Bergamo e Brescia, Sofia Philharmonic Orchestra, Orchestra Sinfonica di Perogia, The George Enescu Philharmonic Orchestra, Cairo Symphony Orchestra, Moscow State Symphonic Orchestra, as well as the orchestra 'Young Russia', and has played under the direction of Pavel Kogan, Joseph Silverstain, Arnold Katz, Epifanio Comis, Mark Gorenstein, Juliano Silvery, Urij Tsuruk, Ilarion Ionescu-Galati, Augustino Orizio and Constantine Orbeljan.

She has also appeared at international musical festivals in Spoletto "Del Due Mondi", Sermonette "Pontino di Musica" (Italy), "Sanat Haber" in Istanbul (Turkey), ETNAFEST in Italy, Rachmaninov International festival 2013 in Ukraine. In Moscow, Russia she has done "Grandi Serate Musicali", "Music in Exile", "Music of 20th Century", "Christmas at the Kremlin."

Ms. Egorova currently is a teacher of Piano High Specialization Courses at the Rachmaninov Academy in Catania, Italy.

Her pianistic repertoire encompasses a wide variety of eras and styles, from concertos and solo monographic works by Bach, Mozart, Beethoven, Schumann, Tchaikovsky, and Liszt to those by contemporary composers.

Ms. Egorova has played chamber music with Vladimir Markovich, Eva Gosser, Nina Kotova, Vladislav Bezrukoff, Robin Meyforf, Anna Kruger, Astrid Shvinn, the Lark String Quartet, and other musicians.

== Awards and outreach ==
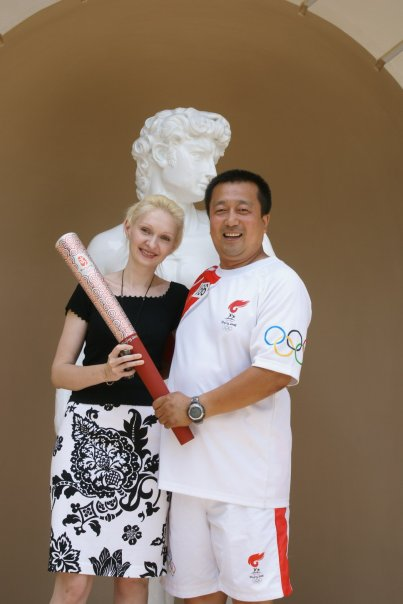
With Chinese sportsman Li Yuanlong

Egorova has received many awards and made many television appearances.

In 1990, Egorova won the second prize on Gian Battista Viotti International Music Competition [15].

In 1991, she won the fourth prize in the Gina Bachauer International Artists Piano Competition.

1992 – First Prize on the Alessandro Casagrande International Piano Competition.

In 2006 – Second Prize of the Sigismund Thalberg International Piano Competition.

On 11 July 2008, Egorova carried the Beijing 2008 Olympic torch through Harbin with famous Chinese sportsman Li Yuanlong.

== Reviews ==
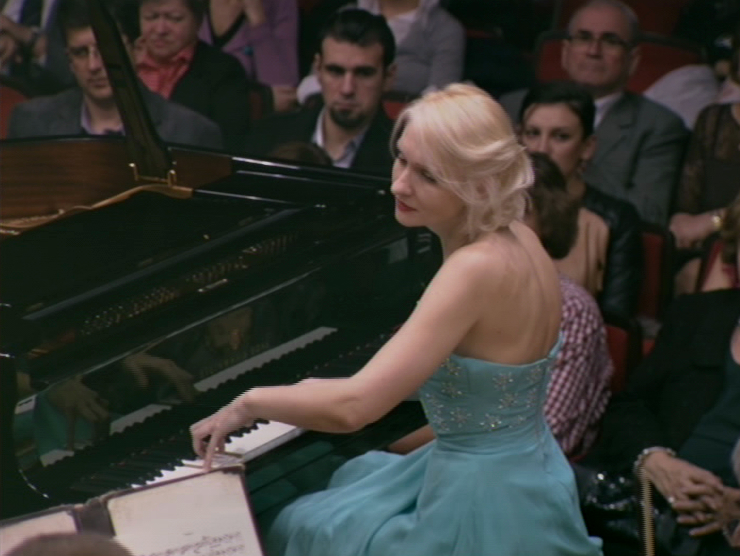
Violetta Egorova in Bucharest

"...The Russian Pianist Violetta Egorova is an intelligent creator, and with an absolute technical superiority in all, she can use both skills for her stunning instrument performance. Her dynamic nuances of power are just as phenomenal as the clarity of the chords of the fine-justified articulation." – Remy Franck.

"...Her Mozart sounds as an angel's voice in the church..." – E. Dellavalle (Italy)

"...With the first chords of the Sonata by Beethoven, Violetta Egorova showed complete penetration into the spirit and sense of the music, which drew to her special attention, which did not cease in the course of two hours while the concert lasted. " N. Pulet (France)

"...Egorova's "Erlkoenig" (Schubert-Liszt), here intense and rhapsodic, with some otherworldly soft playing." – V. Goodfellow (USA).

"...pianist's hands have a language. Romantic expression, impulsive pressure, epic articulation, mincing crispness and daintiness, and an abrupt switch to podaintiness,rova's hands spoke beautifully. -S. Belza (Russia)
