= Vitali Ushakov =

Russian footballer (born 1974)

Personal information
- Full name: Vitali Anatolyevich Ushakov
- Date of birth: 12 September 1974 (age 52)
- Place of birth: Krasnodar, Russian SFSR
- Height: 1.84 m (6 ft 1/2 in)
- Positions: Midfielder; defender

Senior career*
Years	Team	Apps	(Gls)
1991	FC Mayak Kharkiv	3	(0)
1991–1992	FC Torpedo Armavir	39	(0)
1992–1993	FC Kuban Krasnodar	9	(0)
1993	FC Khimik Belorechensk	1	(0)
1994	FC Istochnik Rostov-on-Don	27	(0)
1995	FC Kuban Krasnodar	39	(0)
1996	FC Izumrud Timashyovsk		
1996	FC SKA Rostov-on-Don	6	(0)
1997–1998	FC Torpedo Taganrog	70	(9)
1999	FC Dynamo Vologda	0	(0)
1999	FC Nemkom Krasnodar (amateur)		
2000–2002	FC Yelimay Semipalatinsk	79	(5)
2002–2003	FC Atyrau	40	(2)
2004	FC Zhetysu	11	(0)
2004–2005	FC Taraz	39	(0)
2006–2007	FC Ekibastuzets	48	(2)
2008	FC Aktobe	10	(0)
2009	FC Vostok	10	(0)
2009	FC Kyzylzhar	9	(0)
- * Club domestic league appearances and goals

Vitali Anatolyevich Ushakov (Russian: Виталий Анатольевич Ушаков; born 12 September 1974) is a former Russian football player. He also holds Kazakhstani citizenship.

== Honours ==
Atyrau

- Kazakhstan Premier League runner-up: 2002

Taraz

- Kazakhstan Cup winner: 2004

Aktobe

- Kazakhstan Premier League champion: 2008
- Kazakhstan Cup winner: 2008
