= Ivan Plusch =

Russian contemporary artist (b. 1981)

Ivan Plusch (born 1981) is the pseudonym of Ivan Sergeevich Plyushchev, a Russian contemporary painter and installation artist who aims to depict man and his environment in the context of the post-Soviet era.

== Life ==
Ivan Plusch (Плющ, Иван) was born in Leningrad in 1981. He graduated from the Saint Petersburg Stieglitz State Academy of Art and Design in 2009, and was one of the founders of the Nepokorionnie group (loosely translated as 'the unconquered').

According to a 2023 interview, Plusch stated that “The main question I explore is the question of the existential being of the modern human on the border between the current reality and the reality of new media and technology. I view this process as that of continual and gradual disappearance from existence. The impossibility of finding one's own world, as well as the boundary state between existence and non-existence, form the basis of my work. I try to capture the increasing phantom of existence and disappearance in the environment, the splicing with artificial scenery, not in a particular moment, but by fixing the flow of time through the flow of paint.”

Plusch's paintings and installations have been exhibited at various museums and exhibitions around the world, including the Moscow Museum of Modern Art (2011, 2015, 2017, 2021), the Garage Museum of Contemporary Art (2010), the State Russian Museum (2010, 2011, 2019, 2020, 2021), the Halcyon Gallery (2016), and the 56th Venice Biennale (2015). His work can be found in public and private collections, including the Moscow Museum of Modern Art; the Hermitage Museum, St. Petersburg; the State Russian Museum , St. Petersburg; the Lutherhaus Museum, Wittenberg; and the Triennale di Milano, Milan. Plusch currently lives and works in Budapest.
