= Igor Pestretsov =

Russian footballer

Personal information
- Full name: Igor Dmitriyevich Pestretsov
- Date of birth: 9 January 1963 (age 63)
- Place of birth: Krasnodar, Russian SFSR
- Height: 1.92 m (6 ft 3 1/2 in)
- Position: Goalkeeper

Youth career
- FC Kuban Krasnodar

Senior career*
Years	Team	Apps	(Gls)
1979–1980	FC Kuban Krasnodar	0	(0)
1981	FC Rubin Kazan	11	(0)
1981–1982	FC Dynamo Moscow	0	(0)
1983	FC Dynamo Bryansk	32	(0)
1984–1986	FC Lokomotiv Moscow	50	(0)
1987	FC Kuban Krasnodar	0	(0)
1988–1989	FC Ekibastuzets	66	(0)
1990	Navbahor Namangan	17	(0)
1991	FC Kuban Krasnodar	16	(0)
1993	Piteå IF	7	(0)
1994	IK Brage	0	(0)
1996	FC Spartak Bryansk	8	(0)
- * Club domestic league appearances and goals

Igor Dmitriyevich Pestretsov (Russian: Игорь Дмитриевич Пестрецов; born 9 January 1963) is a former Russian professional footballer.

== See also ==
- Football in Russia
