= Handball at the 2015 Pan American Games – Men's team rosters =

This article shows the rosters of all participating teams at the men's handball tournament at the 2015 Pan American Games in Toronto. Rosters can have a maximum of 15 athletes.

== Argentina ==
The Argentine handball men's team that will compete at the 2015 Pan American Games:

Head coach: (Argentina) Eduardo Gallardo

| No. | Pos. | Name | Date of birth (age) | Height | App. | Goals | Club |
|---|---|---|---|---|---|---|---|
| 1 | GK | Matías Schulz | 12 February 1982 (age 44) | 1.90 m | 107 | 3 | (France) Nantes |
| 2 | LW | Federico Fernández | 17 October 1989 (age 36) | 1.87 m | 94 | 302 | (Argentina) UNLu |
| 3 | RW | Federico Pizarro | 6 July 1986 (age 40) | 1.83 m | 67 | 232 | (Argentina) UNLu |
| 4 | CB | Sebastián Simonet (c) | 12 May 1986 (age 40) | 1.90 m | 130 | 394 | (France) US Ivry |
| 5 | P | Pablo Sebastián Portela | 21 June 1980 (age 46) | 1.90 m | 129 | 60 | (Argentina) River Plate |
| 6 | CB | Diego Simonet | 26 December 1989 (age 36) | 1.89 m | 74 | 320 | (France) Montpellier |
| 8 | LB | Pablo Simonet | 4 May 1992 (age 34) | 1.89 m | 41 | 75 | (France) US Ivry |
| 9 | RB | Leonardo Facundo Querín | 17 April 1982 (age 44) | 1.97 m | 152 | 230 | (France) Billère |
| 10 | RB | Federico Matías Vieyra | 21 July 1988 (age 37) | 1.92 m | 94 | 203 | (France) Istres |
| 12 | GK | Fernando Gabriel García | 31 August 1981 (age 44) | 1.90 m | 186 | 5 | (France) Vernon |
| 13 | LB | Juan Pablo Fernández | 30 September 1988 (age 37) | 1.90 m | 103 | 154 | (Argentina) UNLu |
| 15 | P | Gonzalo Carou | 15 August 1979 (age 46) | 1.94 m | 174 | 353 | (France) Istres |
| 17 | RB | Damián Migueles | 24 November 1983 (age 42) | 1.92 m | 91 | | (Argentina) River Plate |
| 18 | LW | Adrián Portela | 8 March 1986 (age 40) | 1.83 m | 30 | 104 | (Argentina) River Plate |
| 20 | P | Sergio Crevatin | 28 May 1980 (age 46) | 1.87 m | 112 | 153 | (Argentina) SAG LOMAS |

== Brazil ==
Brazil announced their squad on June 1, 2015.

Head coach: (Spain) Jordi Ribera

| No. | Pos. | Name | Date of birth (age) | Height | App. | Goals | Club |
|---|---|---|---|---|---|---|---|
| 1 | GK | Maik Santos | 6 September 1980 (age 45) | 1.80 m | | | (Brazil) Taubaté |
| 2 | CB | Henrique Teixeira | 27 February 1989 (age 37) | 1.92 m | 66 | 102 | (Brazil) Taubaté |
| 3 | RB | Fernando Pacheco Filho | 25 May 1983 (age 43) | 1.90 m | 148 | 455 | (Brazil) Taubaté |
| 5 | CB | Bruno Santana | 27 February 1982 (age 44) | 1.85 m | 24 | 40 | (Brazil) São Caetano do Sul |
| 8 | LB | Raul Nantes | 20 March 1990 (age 36) | 1.94 m | 20 | | (France) Billere Handball |
| 9 | RW | Lucas Cândido | 19 March 1989 (age 37) | 1.82 m | 30 | 60 | (Brazil) Taubaté |
| 13 | CB | Diogo Hubner | 30 January 1983 (age 43) | 1.88 m | 55 | 95 | (Brazil) Taubaté |
| 14 | LB | Thiagus dos Santos | 25 January 1989 (age 37) | 1.98 m | 74 | 120 | (Spain) Logroño |
| 17 | P | Alexandro Pozzer | 21 December 1988 (age 37) | 1.92 m | 37 | 54 | (Spain) Guadalajara |
| 18 | LW | Felipe Ribeiro | 4 May 1985 (age 41) | 1.85 m | 169 | 597 | (France) Montpellier |
| 19 | RW | Fábio Chiuffa | 10 March 1989 (age 37) | 1.87 m | 76 | 128 | (Spain) Guadalajara |
| 25 | P | Vinícius Teixeira | 3 April 1988 (age 38) | 1.90 m | 99 | 161 | (Brazil) Taubaté |
| 26 | RB | Oswaldo Guimarães | 23 October 1989 (age 36) | 1.83 m | 32 | | (Spain) CB Villa de Aranda |
| 33 | LW | André Soares | 13 February 1984 (age 42) | 1.90 m | 32 | | (Brazil) Taubaté |
| 89 | GK | César Almeida | 6 January 1989 (age 37) | 1.87 m | 35 | 0 | (Spain) Guadalajara |

== Canada ==
Canada announced their squad on June 26, 2015.

| No. | Pos. | Name | Date of birth (age) | Height | App. | Goals | Club |
|---|---|---|---|---|---|---|---|
| 1 | GK | Jonathan Leduc | 17 November 1983 (age 42) | 1.83 m | 40 | | (Canada) Celtique HBC |
| 2 | RW | Geoffroy Bessette | 17 September 1982 (age 43) | 1.75 m | 64 | | (Canada) CHAC HBC |
| 3 | CB | Dan Devlin | 25 September 1983 (age 42) | 1.78 m | 37 | | (Canada) Edmonton HBC |
| 5 | LW | Tyrell Johnston | 9 May 1992 (age 34) | 1.83 m | | | (Canada) Edmonton HBC |
| 7 | P | Philippe Thibeault | 14 February 1991 (age 35) | 1.98 m | | | (Canada) Champlain HBC |
| 8 | LB | Alexandre Touzel | 1 February 1992 (age 34) | 1.84 m | | | (Canada) Champlain HBC |
| 13 | RB | Maxime Godin | 16 March 1980 (age 46) | 1.93 m | | | (Canada) CHAC HBC |
| 15 | LB | Alexis Bertrand | 4 November 1982 (age 43) | 1.91 m | 62 | | (Canada) Lévis HBC |
| 16 | GK | Lyndon Suvanto | 6 December 1991 (age 34) | 1.93 m | | | (Canada) Edmonton HBC |
| 17 | LW | Niklas Etter | 2 November 1988 (age 37) | 1.89 m | | | (Switzerland) HS Biel |
| 20 | LW | Norbert Pavlisin | 17 June 1992 (age 34) | 1.86 m | | | (Czech Republic) HK Lovosice |
| 33 | P | Olivier Jung | 13 February 1988 (age 38) | 1.84 m | | | (France) Sélestat Alsace Handball |
| 41 | LB | Mark Alan Walder | 22 January 1990 (age 36) | 1.94 m | | | (Germany) HSG Nord-NF |
| 66 | CB | Casper Bilton | 19 February 1991 (age 35) | 1.91 m | | | (Denmark) AJAX |
| 77 | LB | Tim Sartisson | 9 February 1995 (age 31) | 1.90 | | | (Germany) TUS Ferndorf HBC |

== Chile ==
The Chile handball men's team that will compete at the 2015 Pan American Games:

Head coach: (Chile) Fernando Capurro

| No. | Pos. | Name | Date of birth (age) | Height | App. | Goals | Club |
|---|---|---|---|---|---|---|---|
| 1 | GK | Felipe Barrientos | 12 June 1984 (age 42) | 1.87 m | 75 | 1 | (Chile) Italiano |
| 2 | LW | Sebastián Ceballos | 1 July 1992 (age 34) | 1.75 m | 16 | 31 | (Spain) Zamora |
| 3 | P | Alfredo Valenzuela | 13 February 1986 (age 40) | 1.82 m | 57 | | (Chile) Italiano |
| 4 | RW | Pablo Baeza | 11 November 1988 (age 37) | 1.78 m | 11 | | (Chile) Luterano |
| 5 | CB | Nicolás Jofre | 16 October 1984 (age 41) | 1.80 m | 73 | 66 | (Chile) Santiago Steel |
| 7 | LB | Diego Reyes | 24 July 1992 (age 33) | 1.82 m | 37 | 59 | (Spain) Zamora |
| 8 | RW | Erik Caniu | 2 October 1988 (age 37) | 1.85 m | 5 | 9 | (Chile) Luterano |
| 9 | LB | Javier Frelijj | 28 January 1991 (age 35) | 1.90 m | 5 | 24 | (Chile) Luterano |
| 10 | CB | Cristián Moll Ramírez | 13 March 1993 (age 33) | 1.85 m | 32 | 44 | (Spain) Pedro Alonso Niño |
| 11 | RB | Felipe Maurin | 31 August 1984 (age 41) | 1.88 m | 66 | | (Chile) Ovalle |
| 13 | CB | Guillermo Araya | 6 August 1985 (age 40) | 1.85 m | 73 | 90 | (Chile) Ovalle |
| 14 | L | Esteban Salinas | 18 January 1992 (age 34) | 1.80 m | 41 | 92 | (Spain) Zamora |
| 16 | GK | René Oliva | 7 March 1987 (age 39) | 1.96 m | 48 | 0 | (Chile) Ovalle |
| 17 | RB | Rodrigo Salinas Muñoz | 25 February 1989 (age 37) | 1.88 m | 62 | 172 | (Romania) Steaua București |
| 29 | L | Marco Oneto (c) | 3 June 1982 (age 44) | 2.04 m | 87 | 195 | (Germany) GWD Minden |

== Cuba ==
The Cuba handball men's team that will compete at the 2015 Pan American Games:

Head coach: (Cuba) Luis Delisle

| No. | Pos. | Name | Date of birth (age) | Height | App. | Goals | Club |
|---|---|---|---|---|---|---|---|
| 1 | GK | Alejandro Romero | 17 September 1994 (age 31) | 1.92 m | 22 | | (Cuba) Habana |
| 2 | LB | Pedro Veitia | 17 August 1994 (age 31) | 1.88 m | 19 | | (Cuba) Villa Clara |
| 3 | RW | Omar Toledano | 3 March 1995 (age 31) | 1.94 m | 28 | | Santiago de Cuba |
| 4 | CB | Daniel Garcia | 31 December 1996 (age 29) | 1.97 m | 20 | | Santiago de Cuba |
| 5 | RB | Angel Rivero | 24 October 1992 (age 33) | 1.87 m | 22 | | (Cuba) Holguin |
| 6 | LW | Pavel Caballero | 20 September 1991 (age 34) | 1.83 m | 31 | | (Cuba) Matanzas |
| 7 | LB | Yoan Balazquez | 26 December 1995 (age 30) | 1.94 m | 32 | | (Cuba) Matanzas |
| 9 | CB | Reinier Taboada | 2 June 1997 (age 29) | 1.91 m | 19 | | (Cuba) Habana |
| 10 | LW | Yanquiel Cruzata | 12 November 1991 (age 34) | 1.80 m | 26 | | Santiago de Cuba |
| 12 | GK | Reyniel Justa | 27 August 1991 (age 34) | 1.98 m | 31 | | (Cuba) Ciego de Avila |
| 13 | RB | Angel Hernandez | 4 February 1994 (age 32) | 1.87 m | 24 | | (Cuba) Matanzas |
| 15 | P | Alain Vizcay | 10 June 1992 (age 34) | 1.89 m | 23 | | Santiago de Cuba |
| 16 | GK | Magnol Suarez | 10 August 1994 (age 31) | 2.00 m | 20 | | (Cuba) Ciego de Avila |
| 17 | CB | Noelvis Robles | 29 June 1986 (age 40) | 1.86 m | 56 | | (Cuba) Holguin |

== Dominican Republic ==
The Dominican Republic handball men's team that will compete at the 2015 Pan American Games:

Head coach: (Dominican Republic) Jose Neninger

| No. | Pos. | Name | Date of birth (age) | Height | App. | Goals | Club |
|---|---|---|---|---|---|---|---|
| 1 | GK | Erick Montero | 23 March 1988 (age 38) | | | | (Spain) CH Pardinyes Lleida |
| 2 | LB | Kelvin de Leon | 5 October 1978 (age 47) | | 90 | | (Spain) CH Pardinyes Lleida |
| 3 | RW | Leony de Leon | 5 December 1976 (age 49) | | 85 | | (Spain) CH Pardinyes Lleida |
| 4 | CB | Erinson Tavarez | 15 January 1989 (age 37) | | | | (Spain) CH Pardinyes Lleida |
| 5 | LW | Luis Taveras | 21 April 1978 (age 48) | | 60 | | (Spain) CH Alcarras |
| 7 | LW | Luis Objio | 5 May 1986 (age 40) | | | | (Spain) CH Pardinyes Lleida |
| 8 | P | Franalbert Aybar | 30 December 1980 (age 45) | | 25 | | (Spain) CH Pardinyes Lleida |
| 9 | LB | Geraldo Diaz | 5 May 1990 (age 36) | | | | (Spain) CH Pardinyes Lleida |
| 10 | P | Elvin Fis Carpio | 22 April 1984 (age 42) | | | | (Spain) CH Pardinyes Lleida |
| 11 | P | Pablo Jacobo | 22 December 1979 (age 46) | | 50 | | (Dominican Republic) CH Alcarras |
| 12 | GK | Luis Sanlate | 5 June 1981 (age 45) | | | | (Spain) CH Pardinyes Lleida |
| 14 | LW | Jose Sanchez | 11 January 1991 (age 35) | | | | (Spain) CH Pardinyes Lleida |
| 16 | GK | Irvin Escoto | 12 March 1986 (age 40) | | | | (Spain) CH Pardinyes Lleida |
| 18 | LB | Dioris Matteo | 6 December 1986 (age 39) | | 70 | | (Argentina) Konig Trade Balmazuj |
| 22 | LW | Willibert de la Rosa | 4 May 1993 (age 33) | | | | (Spain) CH Pardinyes Lleida |

== Puerto Rico ==
The Puerto Rico handball men's team that will compete at the 2015 Pan American Games:

Head coach: (Puerto Rico) Harold Millan

| No. | Pos. | Name | Date of birth (age) | Height | App. | Goals | Club |
|---|---|---|---|---|---|---|---|
| 1 | | Pascual Pacheco | 12 April 1990 (age 36) |
| 2 | | Alberto Pizarro | 19 February 1984 (age 42) |
| 3 | | Jose Antonio Sanchez | 10 April 1986 (age 40) |
| 5 | | Orlando Garcia | 15 November 1985 (age 40) |
| 6 | | Angel Benitez | 6 August 1982 (age 43) |
| 8 | | Jorge Nazario | 1 October 1992 (age 33) |
| 9 | | Jose Ceballos | 8 April 1988 (age 38) |
| 10 | | Hector Hiraldo | 16 August 1992 (age 33) |
| 11 | | Jesus Arroyo | 27 June 1981 (age 45) |
| 12 | | Steven Rodriguez | 27 May 1994 (age 32) |
| 14 | | Kristopher Semidey | 9 June 1985 (age 41) |
| 17 | | Joshua Mercado | 17 December 1991 (age 34) |
| 18 | | Ruben Ayala | 9 July 1990 (age 36) |
| 22 | | Edwin Brtio | 26 March 1989 (age 37) |
| 24 | | Juan Santos Ramos | 29 May 1986 (age 40) |

== Uruguay ==
Uruguay announced their squad on July 6, 2015.

Head coach: (Uruguay) Jorge Botejara

| No. | Pos. | Name | Date of birth (age) | Height | App. | Goals | Club |
|---|---|---|---|---|---|---|---|
| 1 | GK | Manuel Adler | 14 July 1992 (age 34) | 1.74 m | | | (Uruguay) Scuola |
| 3 | RW | Matías Gamiz | 15 November 1985 (age 40) | 1.80 m | | | (Uruguay) Scuola |
| 4 | P | Gaston Rudich | 16 November 1981 (age 44) | 1.87 m | | | (Argentina) Alemán |
| 7 | RB | Sebastián Abdala | 20 November 1988 (age 37) | 1.90 m | | | (Italy) Scuola |
| 8 | LB | Alejandro Velazco | 24 October 1993 (age 32) | 1.85 m | | | (Spain) Scuola |
| 9 | CB | Nicolás Fabra | 5 January 1986 (age 40) | 1.82 m | | | (Uruguay) Scuola |
| 10 | RB | Gabriel Spangenberg | 4 April 1986 (age 40) | 1.84 m | | | (Uruguay) Alemán |
| 11 | LW | Federico Rubbo | 5 April 1989 (age 37) | 1.85 m | | | (Uruguay) Scuola |
| 14 | CB | Gonzalo Gamba | 23 July 1982 (age 43) | 1.84 m | | | (Uruguay) Alemán |
| 15 | P | Bruno Méndez | 30 October 1994 (age 31) | 1.90 m | | | (Uruguay) Bohemios |
| 16 | GK | Felipe González | 8 December 1993 (age 32) | 1.90 m | | | (Uruguay) Alemán |
| 17 | LB | Diego Morandeira | 2 April 1993 (age 33) | 1.88 m | | | (Uruguay) Alemán |
| 19 | CB | Rodrigo Botejara | 28 January 1993 (age 33) | 1.74 m | | | (Uruguay) Scuola |
| 22 | LB | Facundo Liston | 7 January 1993 (age 33) | 1.94 m | | | (Uruguay) Scuola |
| 23 | LB | Maximo Cancio | 24 February 1984 (age 42) | 1.88 m | | | (Spain) Scuola |
