= Handball at the 2015 Pan American Games =

- Handball pictogram for the games
- Venue: Exhibition Centre – Hall B
- Dates: July 16–25
- No. of events: 2 (1 men, 1 women)
- Competitors: 239 from 9 nations

Handball competitions at the 2015 Pan American Games in Toronto were held from July 16 to 25 at the Direct Energy Centre (Exhibition Centre in Hall B). Due to naming rights the arena was known as the latter for the duration of the games. A total of eight men's and women's teams competed in each respective tournament.

The winners of the two tournaments qualified for the 2016 Summer Olympics in Rio de Janeiro, Brazil. If the host nation, Brazil won either tournament, the runner up qualified instead.

== Competition schedule ==
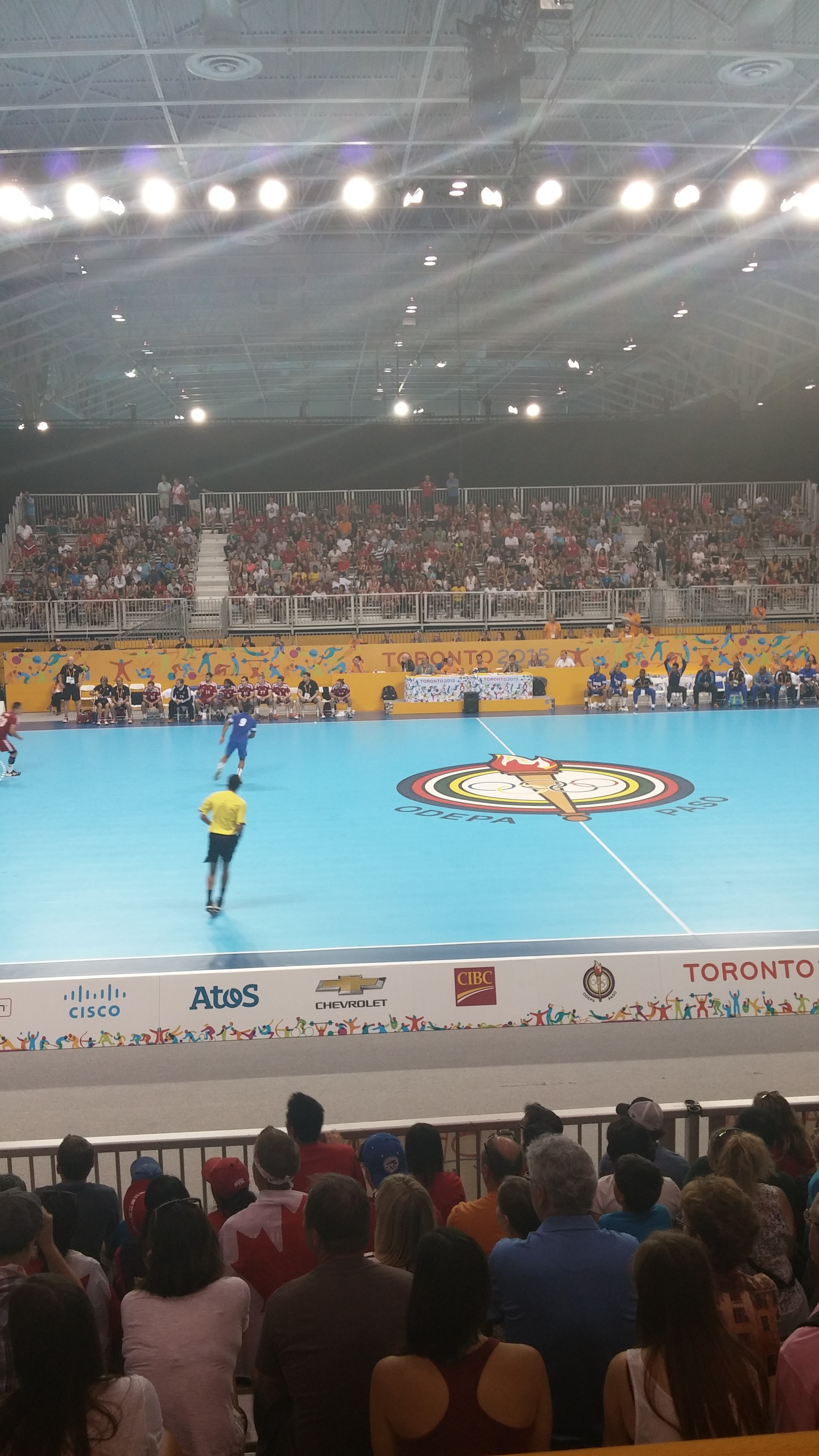
The Direct Energy Centre Hall B (Exhibition Centre), was the venue for the handball competitions

The following was the competition schedule for the handball competitions:

| P | Preliminaries | ½ | Semifinals | B | 3rd place play-off | F | Final |

| Event↓/Date → | Thu 16 | Fri 17 | Sat 18 | Sun 19 | Mon 20 | Tue 21 | Wed 22 | Thu 23 | Fri 24 | | Sat 25 | |
|---|---|---|---|---|---|---|---|---|---|---|---|---|
| Men | | P | | P | | P | | ½ | | | B | F |
| Women | P | | P | | P | | ½ | | B | F | | |

== Medal summary ==
=== Medal table ===
| Rank | Nation | Gold | Silver | Bronze | Total |
|---|---|---|---|---|---|
| 1 | Brazil | 2 | 0 | 0 | 2 |
| 2 | Argentina | 0 | 2 | 0 | 2 |
| 3 | Chile | 0 | 0 | 1 | 1 |
| 3 | Uruguay | 0 | 0 | 1 | 1 |
| Totals (4 entries) | | 2 | 2 | 2 | 6 |

=== Medalists ===
| Event | Gold | Silver | Bronze |
|---|---|---|---|
| Men's tournament | Brazil; Maik Santos; Henrique Teixeira; Fernando Pacheco Filho; Bruno Santana; Raul Nantes; Lucas Cândido; Diogo Hubner; Thiagus dos Santos; Alexandro Pozzer; Felipe Ribeiro; Fábio Chiuffa; Vinícius Teixeira; Oswaldo Guimarães; André Soares; César Almeida | Argentina; Matías Schulz; Federico Fernández; Federico Pizarro; Sebastián Simonet; Pablo Sebastián Portela; Diego Simonet; Pablo Simonet; Leonardo Facundo Querín; Federico Matías Vieyra; Fernando Gabriel García; Juan Pablo Fernández; Gonzalo Carou; Damián Migueles; Adrián Portela; Sergio Crevatin | Chile; Felipe Barrientos; Sebastián Ceballos; Alfredo Valenzuela; Pablo Baeza; Nicolás Jofre; Diego Reyes; Erik Caniu; Javier Frelijj; Cristián Moll Ramírez; Felipe Maurin; Guillermo Araya; Esteban Salinas; René Oliva; Rodrigo Salinas Muñoz; Marco Oneto |
| Women's tournament | Brazil; Alexandra do Nascimento; Samira Rocha; Daniela Piedade; Amanda de Andrade; Tamires Morena Lima; Fernanda da Silva; Ana Paula Rodrigues; Jéssica Quintino; Bárbara Arenhart; Francielle da Rocha; Mayssa Pessoa; Elaine Gomes; Jaqueline Anastácio; Célia Coppi; Deonise Cavaleiro | Argentina; Marisol Carratu; Lucía Haro; Manuela Pizzo; Luciana Salvado; Rocio Campigli; Amelia Belotti; Luciana Mendoza; Victoria Crivelli; Antonella Gambino; Valentina Kogan; Valeria Bianchi; Antonela Mena; Macarena Sans; Macarena Gandulfo; Elke Karsten | Uruguay; Patricia Ré; Paola Santos; Paula Fynn; Soledad Faedo; Alejandra Scarrone; Daniela Scarrone; Alejandra Ferrari; Camila Barreiro; Martina Barreiro; Eliana Falco; Federica Cura; Leticia Schinca; Camila Vázquez; Viviana Ferrari; Iara Grosso |

== Qualification ==
A total of eight men's teams and eight women's teams qualified to compete at the games. The top three teams at the South American and Central American and Caribbean Games qualified for each respective tournament. The host nation (Canada) automatically qualified teams in both events. The United States and Uruguay competed against one another in a home/away playoff for the last spot in each tournament. The fourth placed team in the Central American and Caribbean Games both declined to compete in the respective tournaments. Each team can consist of up to 15 athletes.

=== Men ===
| Event | Date | Location | Vacancies | Qualified |
|---|---|---|---|---|
| Host Nation | —N/a | —N/a | 1 | Canada |
| 2014 South American Games | March 8–14 | (Chile) Santiago | 3 | Brazil; Argentina; Chile |
| 2014 Central American and Caribbean Games | November 16–24 | (Mexico) Veracruz | 3 | Puerto Rico; Dominican Republic; Cuba |
| Last chance qualification tournament | March 7/14, 2015 | (United States) Auburn (Uruguay) Montevideo | 1 | Uruguay |
| Total | | | 8 | |

=== Women ===
| Event | Date | Location | Vacancies | Qualified |
|---|---|---|---|---|
| Host Nation | —N/a | —N/a | 1 | Canada |
| 2014 South American Games | March 7–15 | (Chile) Santiago | 3 | Brazil; Argentina; Chile |
| 2014 Central American and Caribbean Games | November 15–23 | (Mexico) Veracruz | 3 | Cuba; Puerto Rico; Mexico |
| Last chance qualification tournament | March 7/14, 2015 | (United States) Auburn (Uruguay) Montevideo | 1 | Uruguay |
| Total | | | 8 | |

== Participating nations ==
A total of 9 countries qualified athletes. The number of athletes a nation entered is in parentheses beside the name of the country.

- Argentina (30)
- Brazil (30)
- Canada (30)
- Chile (30)
- Cuba (29)
- Dominican Republic (15)
- Mexico (15)
- Puerto Rico (30)
- Uruguay (30)

== See also ==
- List of Pan American Games medalists in handball (men)
