= Handball at the 2016 Summer Olympics – Men's tournament =

Men's handball at the XXXI Olympiad

Tournament details
- Host country: Brazil
- Venue: Future Arena
- Dates: 7–21 August 2016
- Teams: 12 (from 4 confederations)

Final positions
- Champions: Denmark (1st title)
- Runners-up: France
- Third place: Germany
- Fourth place: Poland

Tournament statistics
- Matches played: 38
- Goals scored: 2,081 (54.76 per match)
- Top scorer(s): (Poland) Karol Bielecki (55 goals)

Awards
- Best player: (Denmark) Mikkel Hansen

The men's tournament of Handball at the 2016 Summer Olympics at Rio de Janeiro, Brazil, began on 7 August and ended on 21 August 2016. Games were held at the Future Arena.

Denmark won their first gold medal, defeating defending champion France 28–26 in the final. Germany won the bronze medal by defeating Poland 31–25.

The medals were presented by Gunilla Lindberg, Yumilka Ruiz and Tony Estanguet, IOC members from Sweden, Cuba and France respectively and by Hassan Moustafa, Miguel Roca Mas and Per Bertelsen, President, 1st Vice President and Caretaker Chairman of the Commission of Organizing and Competition of the IHF respectively.

== Competition schedule ==
Event↓/Date →	Sun 7	Mon 8	Tue 9	Wed 10	Thu 11	Fri 12	Sat 13	Sun 14	Mon 15	Tue 16	Wed 17	Thu 18	Fri 19	Sat 20	Sun 21	
Men	G		G		G		G		G		¼		½		B	F

G	Group stage	¼	Quarter-finals	½	Semi-finals	B	Bronze medal match	F	Final

== Qualification ==
Mean of qualification	Date	Host	Vacancies	Qualified
Host nation	2 October 2009	(Denmark) Copenhagen	1	Brazil
2015 World Championship	15 January – 1 February 2015	Qatar	1	France
2015 Pan American Games	16–25 July 2015	(Canada) Toronto	1	Argentina
2015 Asian Qualification Tournament	14–27 November 2015	(Qatar) Doha	1	Qatar
2016 European Championship	15–31 January 2016	Poland	1	Germany
2016 African Championship	21–30 January 2016	(Egypt) Cairo	1	Egypt
2016 Olympic Qualification Tournaments	8–10 April 2016	(Poland) Gdańsk	2	Poland
2016 Olympic Qualification Tournaments	8–10 April 2016	(Poland) Gdańsk	2	Tunisia
2016 Olympic Qualification Tournaments	8–10 April 2016	(Sweden) Malmö	2	Slovenia
2016 Olympic Qualification Tournaments	8–10 April 2016	(Sweden) Malmö	2	Sweden
2016 Olympic Qualification Tournaments	8–10 April 2016	(Denmark) Herning	2	Denmark
2016 Olympic Qualification Tournaments	8–10 April 2016	(Denmark) Herning	2	Croatia
Total			12	

== Competition format ==
The twelve teams in the tournament were divided into two groups of six, with each team initially playing round-robin games within their group. Following the completion of the round-robin stage, the top four teams from each group advance to the quarter-finals. The two semi-final winners meet for the gold medal match, while the semi-final losers play in the bronze medal match.

== Referees ==
16 refereeing pairs were selected on 5 July 2016.

Referees
Brazil	Nilson Menezes; Rogéro Pinto
Czech Republic	Václav Horáček; Jiří Novotný
Denmark	Martin Gjeding; Mads Hansen
Egypt	Mohamed Rashed; Tamer El-Sayed
France	Charlotte Bonaventura; Julie Bonaventura
Germany	Lars Geipel; Marcus Helbig
Iceland	Jónas Elíasson; Anton Pálsson
Iran	Majid Kolahdouzan; Alireza Mousaviyan

Referees
Ivory Coast	Yalatima Coulibaly; Mamadou Diabaté
Macedonia	Gjorgji Nachevski; Slave Nikolov
Norway	Kjersti Arntsen; Guro Røen
Russia	Viktoria Alpaidze; Tatiana Berekzina
Slovenia	David Sok; Bojan Lah
Portugal	Santos Duarte; Fonseca Ricardo
South Korea	Koo Bon-ok; Lee Se-ok
Spain	Óscar Raluy López; Ángel Sabroso Ramírez

== Draw ==
The draw took place on 29 April 2016.

=== Seeding ===
The seeding was announced on 10 April 2016.

Pot 1	Pot 2	Pot 3	Pot 4	Pot 5	Pot 6
France; Poland	Slovenia; Denmark	Croatia; Sweden	Tunisia; Brazil	Germany; Qatar	Argentina; Egypt

== Group stage ==
All times are local (UTC−3).

=== Group A ===
Pos	Team	Pld	W	D	L	GF	GA	GD	Pts	Qualification
1	Croatia	5	4	0	1	147	134	+13	8 (Note: Croatia 29–28 France)	Quarter-finals
2	France	5	4	0	1	152	126	+26	8	Quarter-finals
3	Denmark	5	3	0	2	136	127	+9	6	Quarter-finals
4	Qatar	5	2	1	2	122	127	−5	5	Quarter-finals
5	Argentina	5	1	0	4	110	126	−16	2	
6	Tunisia	5	0	1	4	118	145	−27	1	

Source: IHF
Rules for classification: 1) Points; 2) Head-to-head points; 3) Head-to-head goal difference; 4) Head-to-head goals scored; 5) Goal difference; 6) Goals scored; 7) Draw.
Notes:

7 August 2016; 09:30	Croatia	23–30	Qatar	Future Arena, Rio de Janeiro; Referees: López, Ramírez (ESP)
7 August 2016; 09:30	Štrlek 5	(8–15)	Marković 10	Future Arena, Rio de Janeiro; Referees: López, Ramírez (ESP)
7 August 2016; 09:30	3× (yellow card) 5× (suspension)	Report	1× (yellow card) 6× (suspension)	Future Arena, Rio de Janeiro; Referees: López, Ramírez (ESP)

7 August 2016; 14:40	Denmark	25–19	Argentina	Future Arena, Rio de Janeiro; Referees: Lah, Sok (SLO)
7 August 2016; 14:40	Hansen, Svan 6	(10–10)	Simonet 7	Future Arena, Rio de Janeiro; Referees: Lah, Sok (SLO)
7 August 2016; 14:40	3× (yellow card) 4× (suspension) 1× (red card)	Report	3× (yellow card) 3× (suspension)	Future Arena, Rio de Janeiro; Referees: Lah, Sok (SLO)

7 August 2016; 19:50	France	25–23	Tunisia	Future Arena, Rio de Janeiro; Referees: Geipel, Helbig (GER)
7 August 2016; 19:50	Mahé 5	(16–11)	Tej 6	Future Arena, Rio de Janeiro; Referees: Geipel, Helbig (GER)
7 August 2016; 19:50	3× (yellow card) 1× (suspension)	Report	4× (yellow card) 6× (suspension)	Future Arena, Rio de Janeiro; Referees: Geipel, Helbig (GER)

9 August 2016; 09:30	Qatar	20–35	France	Future Arena, Rio de Janeiro; Referees: Horáček, Novotný (CZE)
9 August 2016; 09:30	three players 4	(13–16)	Abalo 7	Future Arena, Rio de Janeiro; Referees: Horáček, Novotný (CZE)
9 August 2016; 09:30	2× (yellow card) 4× (suspension)	Report	3× (yellow card) 3× (suspension)	Future Arena, Rio de Janeiro; Referees: Horáček, Novotný (CZE)

9 August 2016; 14:40	Tunisia	23–31	Denmark	Future Arena, Rio de Janeiro; Referees: Pinto, Menezes (BRA)
9 August 2016; 14:40	Jallouz 5	(10–16)	Mortensen, Svan 8	Future Arena, Rio de Janeiro; Referees: Pinto, Menezes (BRA)
9 August 2016; 14:40	1× (yellow card) 2× (suspension) 1× (red card)	Report	3× (yellow card) 3× (suspension)	Future Arena, Rio de Janeiro; Referees: Pinto, Menezes (BRA)

9 August 2016; 21:50	Argentina	26–27	Croatia	Future Arena, Rio de Janeiro; Referees: Rashed, El-Sayed (EGY)
9 August 2016; 21:50	F. Fernández 8	(15–14)	Štrlek 7	Future Arena, Rio de Janeiro; Referees: Rashed, El-Sayed (EGY)
9 August 2016; 21:50	2× (yellow card) 4× (suspension) 1× (red card)	Report	4× (yellow card) 3× (suspension)	Future Arena, Rio de Janeiro; Referees: Rashed, El-Sayed (EGY)

11 August 2016; 09:30	Tunisia	25–25	Qatar	Future Arena, Rio de Janeiro; Referees: Gjeding, Hansen (DEN)
11 August 2016; 09:30	Boughanmi 8	(12–11)	Capote 12	Future Arena, Rio de Janeiro; Referees: Gjeding, Hansen (DEN)
11 August 2016; 09:30	2× (yellow card) 6× (suspension)	Report	2× (yellow card) 5× (suspension)	Future Arena, Rio de Janeiro; Referees: Gjeding, Hansen (DEN)

11 August 2016; 14:40	Denmark	24–27	Croatia	Future Arena, Rio de Janeiro; Referees: Geipel, Helbig (GER)
11 August 2016; 14:40	Svan Hansen 9	(12–15)	Duvnjak 8	Future Arena, Rio de Janeiro; Referees: Geipel, Helbig (GER)
11 August 2016; 14:40	2× (yellow card) 3× (suspension)	Report	4× (yellow card) 5× (suspension)	Future Arena, Rio de Janeiro; Referees: Geipel, Helbig (GER)

11 August 2016; 21:50	France	31–24	Argentina	Future Arena, Rio de Janeiro; Referees: Nikolov, Nachevski (MKD)
11 August 2016; 21:50	Abalo 7	(17–12)	F. Fernández 8	Future Arena, Rio de Janeiro; Referees: Nikolov, Nachevski (MKD)
11 August 2016; 21:50	3× (yellow card) 4× (suspension) 1× (red card)	Report	3× (yellow card) 5× (suspension)	Future Arena, Rio de Janeiro; Referees: Nikolov, Nachevski (MKD)

13 August 2016; 11:30	Croatia	29–28	France	Future Arena, Rio de Janeiro; Referees: Pálsson, Elíasson (ISL)
13 August 2016; 11:30	Kopljar 6	(14–12)	Guigou 10	Future Arena, Rio de Janeiro; Referees: Pálsson, Elíasson (ISL)
13 August 2016; 11:30	4× (yellow card) 5× (suspension) 2× (red card)	Report	4× (yellow card) 2× (suspension)	Future Arena, Rio de Janeiro; Referees: Pálsson, Elíasson (ISL)

13 August 2016; 14:40	Denmark	26–25	Qatar	Future Arena, Rio de Janeiro; Referees: Rashed, El-Sayed (EGY)
13 August 2016; 14:40	Svan 7	(14–14)	Markovic 7	Future Arena, Rio de Janeiro; Referees: Rashed, El-Sayed (EGY)
13 August 2016; 14:40	4× (yellow card) 5× (suspension)	Report	3× (yellow card) 3× (suspension)	Future Arena, Rio de Janeiro; Referees: Rashed, El-Sayed (EGY)

13 August 2016; 21:50	Argentina	23–21	Tunisia	Future Arena, Rio de Janeiro; Referees: Koo, Lee (KOR)
13 August 2016; 21:50	Pizarro 7	(14–10)	Boughanmi 8	Future Arena, Rio de Janeiro; Referees: Koo, Lee (KOR)
13 August 2016; 21:50	3× (yellow card) 5× (suspension)	Report	4× (yellow card) 4× (suspension) 1× (red card)	Future Arena, Rio de Janeiro; Referees: Koo, Lee (KOR)

15 August 2016; 14:40	France	33–30	Denmark	Future Arena, Rio de Janeiro; Referees: Lah, Sok (SLO)
15 August 2016; 14:40	Mahé 9	(17–16)	Hansen 8	Future Arena, Rio de Janeiro; Referees: Lah, Sok (SLO)
15 August 2016; 14:40	2× (yellow card) 3× (suspension)	Report	3× (yellow card) 5× (suspension)	Future Arena, Rio de Janeiro; Referees: Lah, Sok (SLO)

15 August 2016; 19:50	Croatia	41–26	Tunisia	Future Arena, Rio de Janeiro; Referees: Coulibaly, Diabaté (CIV)
15 August 2016; 19:50	Karačić 9	(25–10)	Boughanmi 7	Future Arena, Rio de Janeiro; Referees: Coulibaly, Diabaté (CIV)
15 August 2016; 19:50	2× (yellow card) 4× (suspension)	Report	1× (yellow card) 1× (suspension)	Future Arena, Rio de Janeiro; Referees: Coulibaly, Diabaté (CIV)

15 August 2016; 21:50	Qatar	22–18	Argentina	Future Arena, Rio de Janeiro; Referees: López, Ramírez (ESP)
15 August 2016; 21:50	Capote, Memišević 4	(12–9)	Simonet 5	Future Arena, Rio de Janeiro; Referees: López, Ramírez (ESP)
15 August 2016; 21:50	3× (yellow card) 4× (suspension)	Report	4× (yellow card) 4× (suspension)	Future Arena, Rio de Janeiro; Referees: López, Ramírez (ESP)

=== Group B ===
Pos	Team	Pld	W	D	L	GF	GA	GD	Pts	Qualification
1	Germany	5	4	0	1	153	141	+12	8 (Note: Slovenia 25–28 Germany)	Quarter-finals
2	Slovenia	5	4	0	1	137	126	+11	8	Quarter-finals
3	Brazil (H)	5	2	1	2	141	150	−9	5	Quarter-finals
4	Poland	5	2	0	3	139	140	−1	4	Quarter-finals
5	Egypt	5	1	1	3	129	143	−14	3	
6	Sweden	5	1	0	4	132	131	+1	2	

Source: IHF
Rules for classification: 1) Points; 2) Head-to-head points; 3) Head-to-head goal difference; 4) Head-to-head goals scored; 5) Goal difference; 6) Goals scored; 7) Draw.
(H) Hosts
Notes:

7 August 2016; 11:30	Sweden	29–32	Germany	Future Arena, Rio de Janeiro; Referees: Hansen, Gjeding (DEN)
7 August 2016; 11:30	Tollbring 8	(15–18)	Kühn 7	Future Arena, Rio de Janeiro; Referees: Hansen, Gjeding (DEN)
7 August 2016; 11:30	4× (yellow card) 9× (suspension) 1× (red card)	Report	3× (yellow card) 9× (suspension)	Future Arena, Rio de Janeiro; Referees: Hansen, Gjeding (DEN)

7 August 2016; 16:40	Poland	32–34	Brazil	Future Arena, Rio de Janeiro; Referees: Nachevski, Nikolov (MKD)
7 August 2016; 16:40	Daszek 8	(13–16)	Toledo 7	Future Arena, Rio de Janeiro; Referees: Nachevski, Nikolov (MKD)
7 August 2016; 16:40	4× (yellow card) 5× (suspension)	Report	3× (yellow card) 6× (suspension)	Future Arena, Rio de Janeiro; Referees: Nachevski, Nikolov (MKD)

7 August 2016; 21:50	Slovenia	27–26	Egypt	Future Arena, Rio de Janeiro; Referees: Pálsson, Elíasson (ISL)
7 August 2016; 21:50	Janc 8	(15–15)	El-Ahmar 7	Future Arena, Rio de Janeiro; Referees: Pálsson, Elíasson (ISL)
7 August 2016; 21:50	3× (yellow card) 9× (suspension)	Report	4× (yellow card) 5× (suspension) 1× (red card)	Future Arena, Rio de Janeiro; Referees: Pálsson, Elíasson (ISL)

9 August 2016; 11:30	Germany	32–29	Poland	Future Arena, Rio de Janeiro; Referees: Lopéz, Ramírez (ESP)
9 August 2016; 11:30	three players 5	(16–14)	Bielecki 10	Future Arena, Rio de Janeiro; Referees: Lopéz, Ramírez (ESP)
9 August 2016; 11:30	4× (yellow card) 6× (suspension) 1× (red card)	Report	3× (yellow card) 5× (suspension)	Future Arena, Rio de Janeiro; Referees: Lopéz, Ramírez (ESP)

9 August 2016; 16:40	Brazil	28–31	Slovenia	Future Arena, Rio de Janeiro; Referees: Gjeding, Hansen (DEN)
9 August 2016; 16:40	Chiuffa 8	(13–16)	Janc 6	Future Arena, Rio de Janeiro; Referees: Gjeding, Hansen (DEN)
9 August 2016; 16:40	2× (yellow card) 6× (suspension)	Report	2× (yellow card) 13× (suspension)	Future Arena, Rio de Janeiro; Referees: Gjeding, Hansen (DEN)

9 August 2016; 19:50	Egypt	26–25	Sweden	Future Arena, Rio de Janeiro; Referees: Mousaviyan, Kolahdouzan (IRI)
9 August 2016; 19:50	Sanad 7	(12–13)	Petersen 5	Future Arena, Rio de Janeiro; Referees: Mousaviyan, Kolahdouzan (IRI)
9 August 2016; 19:50	4× (yellow card) 7× (suspension)	Report	3× (yellow card) 8× (suspension)	Future Arena, Rio de Janeiro; Referees: Mousaviyan, Kolahdouzan (IRI)

11 August 2016; 11:30	Poland	33–25	Egypt	Future Arena, Rio de Janeiro; Referees: Santos, Fonseca (POR)
11 August 2016; 11:30	Daszek 6	(16–10)	Eissa 6	Future Arena, Rio de Janeiro; Referees: Santos, Fonseca (POR)
11 August 2016; 11:30	4× (yellow card) 7× (suspension)	Report	3× (yellow card) 6× (suspension) 1× (red card)	Future Arena, Rio de Janeiro; Referees: Santos, Fonseca (POR)

11 August 2016; 16:40	Brazil	33–30	Germany	Future Arena, Rio de Janeiro; Referees: Horáček, Novotný (CZE)
11 August 2016; 16:40	Chiuffa 8	(17–16)	Häfner, Reichmann 6	Future Arena, Rio de Janeiro; Referees: Horáček, Novotný (CZE)
11 August 2016; 16:40	2× (yellow card) 4× (suspension) 1× (red card)	Report	4× (yellow card) 5× (suspension) 1× (red card)	Future Arena, Rio de Janeiro; Referees: Horáček, Novotný (CZE)

11 August 2016; 19:50	Slovenia	29–24	Sweden	Future Arena, Rio de Janeiro; Referees: Lopéz, Ramírez (ESP)
11 August 2016; 19:50	Janc, Razgor 5	(14–13)	Tollbring 6	Future Arena, Rio de Janeiro; Referees: Lopéz, Ramírez (ESP)
11 August 2016; 19:50	4× (yellow card) 7× (suspension)	Report	4× (yellow card) 6× (suspension)	Future Arena, Rio de Janeiro; Referees: Lopéz, Ramírez (ESP)

13 August 2016; 09:30	Slovenia	25–28	Germany	Future Arena, Rio de Janeiro; Referees: Nikolov, Nachevski (MKD)
13 August 2016; 09:30	Dolenec 6	(12–11)	Gensheimer 6	Future Arena, Rio de Janeiro; Referees: Nikolov, Nachevski (MKD)
13 August 2016; 09:30	4× (yellow card) 6× (suspension)	Report	4× (yellow card) 8× (suspension)	Future Arena, Rio de Janeiro; Referees: Nikolov, Nachevski (MKD)

13 August 2016; 16:40	Egypt	27–27	Brazil	Future Arena, Rio de Janeiro; Referees: Lah, Sok (SLO)
13 August 2016; 16:40	El-Ahmar 9	(15–13)	four players 4	Future Arena, Rio de Janeiro; Referees: Lah, Sok (SLO)
13 August 2016; 16:40	3× (yellow card) 7× (suspension)	Report	4× (yellow card) 2× (suspension)	Future Arena, Rio de Janeiro; Referees: Lah, Sok (SLO)

13 August 2016; 19:50	Sweden	24–25	Poland	Future Arena, Rio de Janeiro; Referees: Geipel, Helbig (GER)
13 August 2016; 19:50	Stenmalm 8	(13–12)	Bielecki 8	Future Arena, Rio de Janeiro; Referees: Geipel, Helbig (GER)
13 August 2016; 19:50	3× (yellow card) 2× (suspension)	Report	4× (yellow card) 8× (suspension)	Future Arena, Rio de Janeiro; Referees: Geipel, Helbig (GER)

15 August 2016; 09:30	Poland	20–25	Slovenia	Future Arena, Rio de Janeiro; Referees: Horáček, Novotný (CZE)
15 August 2016; 09:30	Bielecki 4	(13–13)	Zarabec 7	Future Arena, Rio de Janeiro; Referees: Horáček, Novotný (CZE)
15 August 2016; 09:30	2× (yellow card) 5× (suspension) 1× (red card)	Report	2× (yellow card) 8× (suspension)	Future Arena, Rio de Janeiro; Referees: Horáček, Novotný (CZE)

15 August 2016; 11:30	Germany	31–25	Egypt	Future Arena, Rio de Janeiro; Referees: Hansen, Gjeding (DEN)
15 August 2016; 11:30	Gensheimer 7	(15–12)	Sanad 7	Future Arena, Rio de Janeiro; Referees: Hansen, Gjeding (DEN)
15 August 2016; 11:30	2× (yellow card) 9× (suspension)	Report	1× (yellow card) 3× (suspension)	Future Arena, Rio de Janeiro; Referees: Hansen, Gjeding (DEN)

15 August 2016; 16:40	Sweden	30–19	Brazil	Future Arena, Rio de Janeiro; Referees: Santos, Fonseca (POR)
15 August 2016; 16:40	Stenmalm 6	(16–10)	Toledo 4	Future Arena, Rio de Janeiro; Referees: Santos, Fonseca (POR)
15 August 2016; 16:40	4× (yellow card) 4× (suspension)	Report	2× (yellow card) 3× (suspension)	Future Arena, Rio de Janeiro; Referees: Santos, Fonseca (POR)

== Knockout stage ==
=== Bracket ===
Quarter-finals
17 August
Croatia	27
Poland	30
17 August
Denmark	37
Slovenia	30
17 August
Brazil	27
France	34
17 August
Germany	34
Qatar	22

Semi-finals
19 August
Poland	28
Denmark (OT)	29
19 August
France	29
Germany	28

Gold medal
21 August
Denmark	28
France	26
Bronze medal
21 August
4th Poland	25
Germany	31

=== Quarterfinals ===
17 August 2016; 10:00	Brazil	27–34	France	Future Arena, Rio de Janeiro; Referees: Horáček, Novotný (CZE)
17 August 2016; 10:00	Pozzer 8	(16–16)	Guigou 8	Future Arena, Rio de Janeiro; Referees: Horáček, Novotný (CZE)
17 August 2016; 10:00	3× (yellow card) 4× (suspension)	Report	2× (yellow card) 3× (suspension)	Future Arena, Rio de Janeiro; Referees: Horáček, Novotný (CZE)

17 August 2016; 13:30	Germany	34–22	Qatar	Future Arena, Rio de Janeiro; Referees: Lah, Sok (SLO)
17 August 2016; 13:30	three players 5	(16–12)	Capote 9	Future Arena, Rio de Janeiro; Referees: Lah, Sok (SLO)
17 August 2016; 13:30	3× (yellow card) 5× (suspension)	Report	3× (yellow card) 1× (suspension)	Future Arena, Rio de Janeiro; Referees: Lah, Sok (SLO)

17 August 2016; 17:00	Denmark	37–30	Slovenia	Future Arena, Rio de Janeiro; Referees: Lopéz, Ramírez (ESP)
17 August 2016; 17:00	M. Hansen, L. Hansen 8	(16–13)	Bezjak, Janc 6	Future Arena, Rio de Janeiro; Referees: Lopéz, Ramírez (ESP)
17 August 2016; 17:00	3× (yellow card) 5× (suspension)	Report	4× (yellow card) 8× (suspension)	Future Arena, Rio de Janeiro; Referees: Lopéz, Ramírez (ESP)

17 August 2016; 20:30	Croatia	27–30	Poland	Future Arena, Rio de Janeiro; Referees: Geipel, Helbig (GER)
17 August 2016; 20:30	Čupić, Stepančić 7	(14–18)	Bielecki 12	Future Arena, Rio de Janeiro; Referees: Geipel, Helbig (GER)
17 August 2016; 20:30	4× (yellow card) 2× (suspension) 1× (red card)	Report	2× (yellow card) 2× (suspension)	Future Arena, Rio de Janeiro; Referees: Geipel, Helbig (GER)

=== Semifinals ===
19 August 2016; 15:30	France	29–28	Germany	Future Arena, Rio de Janeiro; Referees: Hansen, Gjeding (DEN)
19 August 2016; 15:30	Narcisse 7	(16–13)	Gensheimer 11	Future Arena, Rio de Janeiro; Referees: Hansen, Gjeding (DEN)
19 August 2016; 15:30	3× (yellow card) 4× (suspension)	Report	3× (yellow card) 5× (suspension)	Future Arena, Rio de Janeiro; Referees: Hansen, Gjeding (DEN)

19 August 2016
20:30
Poland
28–29 (ET)
Denmark
Future Arena, Rio de Janeiro
Referees: Horáček, Novotný (CZE)
Bielecki 7
(15–16)
M. Hansen 10
4× (yellow card) 3× (suspension)
Report
3× (yellow card) 3× (suspension)

FT: 25–25 ET: 3–4

=== Bronze medal game ===
21 August 2016; 10:30	Poland	25–31	Germany	Future Arena, Rio de Janeiro; Referees: Horáček, Novotný (CZE)
21 August 2016; 10:30	Krajewski, Lijewski 5	(13–17)	Reichmann 7	Future Arena, Rio de Janeiro; Referees: Horáček, Novotný (CZE)
21 August 2016; 10:30	1× (yellow card) 5× (suspension)	Report	3× (yellow card) 5× (suspension)	Future Arena, Rio de Janeiro; Referees: Horáček, Novotný (CZE)

=== Gold medal game ===
21 August 2016; 14:00	Denmark	28–26	France	Future Arena, Rio de Janeiro; Referees: López, Ramírez (ESP)
21 August 2016; 14:00	M. Hansen 8	(16–14)	Guigou 6	Future Arena, Rio de Janeiro; Referees: López, Ramírez (ESP)
21 August 2016; 14:00	2× (yellow card) 4× (suspension)	Report	3× (yellow card) 2× (suspension)	Future Arena, Rio de Janeiro; Referees: López, Ramírez (ESP)

== Ranking and statistics ==
=== Final ranking ===
Rank	Team
Gold medal	Denmark
Silver medal	France
Bronze medal	Germany
4	Poland
5	Croatia
6	Slovenia
7	Brazil
8	Qatar
9	Egypt
10	Argentina
11	Sweden
12	Tunisia

- Source: IHF.info

=== All-star team ===
- Goalkeeper: (Denmark) Niklas Landin Jacobsen
- Left wing: (Germany) Uwe Gensheimer
- Left back: (Denmark) Mikkel Hansen
- Central back: (France) Nikola Karabatic
- Right back: (France) Valentin Porte
- Right wing: (Denmark) Lasse Svan Hansen
- Line player: (France) Cedric Sorhaindo
- MVP: (Denmark) Mikkel Hansen

Source: IHF.info

=== Top goalscorers ===
Rank	Name	Goals	Shots	%
1	(Poland) Karol Bielecki	55	87	63
2	(Denmark) Mikkel Hansen	54	87	62
3	(Denmark) Lasse Svan Hansen	49	70	70
3	(Germany) Uwe Gensheimer	49	62	79
5	(Germany) Tobias Reichmann	41	50	82
6	(Qatar) Rafael Capote	40	66	61
7	(France) Michaël Guigou	39	52	75
8	(Qatar) Žarko Marković	33	70	47
8	(Poland) Michał Daszek	33	43	77
10	(France) Daniel Narcisse	32	44	73
10	(France) Valentin Porte	32	49	65

Source: IHF

=== Top goalkeepers ===
Rank	Name	%	Saves	Shots
1	(Germany) Silvio Heinevetter	40	26	65
2	(Qatar) Danijel Šarić	35	55	157
3	(France) Thierry Omeyer	34	75	223
3	(Poland) Piotr Wyszomirski	34	67	196
3	(Sweden) Mikael Appelgren	34	24	70
6	(Tunisia) Marouen Maggaiz	33	50	153
7	(Argentina) Matías Schulz	31	45	145
7	(Croatia) Ivan Stevanović	31	35	114
9	(Germany) Andreas Wolff	31	35	114
10	(Brazil) Maik Santos	30	69	228

Source: IHF

== Medalists ==
Gold	Silver	Bronze
Denmark: Niklas Landin Jacobsen; Mads Christiansen; Mads Mensah Larsen; Casper Ulrich Mortensen; Jesper Nøddesbo; Jannick Green; Lasse Svan Hansen; Rene Toft Hansen; Henrik Møllgaard; Kasper Søndergaard; Henrik Toft Hansen; Mikkel Hansen; Morten Olsen; Michael Damgaard	France: Olivier Nyokas; Daniel Narcisse; Vincent Gérard; Nikola Karabatić; Kentin Mahé; Mathieu Grébille; Thierry Omeyer; Timothey N'Guessan; Luc Abalo; Cédric Sorhaindo; Michaël Guigou; Luka Karabatic; Ludovic Fabregas; Adrien Dipanda; Valentin Porte	Germany: Uwe Gensheimer; Finn Lemke; Patrick Wiencek; Tobias Reichmann; Fabian Wiede; Silvio Heinevetter; Hendrik Pekeler; Steffen Weinhold; Martin Strobel; Steffen Fath; Kai Häfner; Andreas Wolff; Julius Kühn; Christian Dissinger; Paul Drux
