= 2017 International Tournament of Spain =

Tournament details
- Host country: Spain
- Venue(s): 1 (in 1 host city)
- Dates: 6–8 January
- Teams: 4 (from 3 confederations)

Final positions
- Champions: Spain
- Runner-up: Qatar
- Third place: Poland
- Fourth place: Argentina

Tournament statistics
- Matches played: 6
- Goals scored: 330 (55 per match)
- Top scorer(s): (Spain) Valero Rivera Folch (16 goals)

The 2017 International Tournament of Spain was the 42nd edition of the International Tournament of Spain, 16th edition with the name of Memorial Domingo Barcenas, held in Irun, Spain, 6–8 January as a friendly handball tournament organised by the Royal Spanish Handball Federation as a preparation of the host nation to the 2017 World Men's Handball Championship.

== Results ==
Team	Pld	W	D	L	GF	GA	GD	Pts
Spain	3	3	0	0	100	72	+28	6
Qatar	3	2	0	1	83	82	+1	4
Poland	3	0	1	2	71	82	–11	1
Argentina	3	0	1	2	76	94	–18	1

== Round robin ==
All times are local (UTC+01:00).

January 6; 17:00	Qatar	30–25	Argentina	Pabellón Polideportivo Artaleku, Irun
January 6; 17:00	Benali 6	(13–14)	Pizarro 7	Pabellón Polideportivo Artaleku, Irun

January 6; 19:00	Spain	30–20	Poland	Pabellón Polideportivo Artaleku, Irun
January 6; 19:00	Rivera, Sarmiento 6	(11–11)	T. Gębala, Przybylski 4	Pabellón Polideportivo Artaleku, Irun

January 7; 16:00	Poland	25–26	Qatar	Pabellón Polideportivo Artaleku, Irun
January 7; 16:00	M. Gębala 6	(11–15)	Capote 5	Pabellón Polideportivo Artaleku, Irun

January 7; 18:00	Spain	38–25	Argentina	Pabellón Polideportivo Artaleku, Irun
January 7; 18:00	four players 5	(17–10)	three players 4	Pabellón Polideportivo Artaleku, Irun

January 8; 11:00	Argentina	26–26	Poland	Pabellón Polideportivo Artaleku, Irun
January 8; 11:00	Simonet 6	(13–10)	Daszek, Przybylski 5	Pabellón Polideportivo Artaleku, Irun

January 8; 13:00	Spain	32–27	Qatar	Pabellón Polideportivo Artaleku, Irun
January 8; 13:00	Rivera, Tomás 5	(19–14)	Capote 5	Pabellón Polideportivo Artaleku, Irun

== Final standing ==
Rank	Team
Gold medal	Spain
2	Qatar
3	Poland
4	Argentina
