= 2016 Christmas Handball Tournament of Four =

- tournament logo

Tournament details
- Host country: Russia
- Venue: 1 (in 1 host city)
- Dates: 08–10 January
- Teams: 4 (from 2 confederations)

Final positions
- Champions: Russia
- Runners-up: Netherlands
- Third place: Argentina
- Fourth place: Belarus

Tournament statistics
- Matches played: 6
- Goals scored: 343 (57.17 per match)
- Top scorers: (Belarus) Siarhei Rutenka (19 goals)

The 2016 Christmas Handball Tournament of Four was a friendly men's handball tournament, held in Moscow, Russia at the Krylatskoye Sports Palace between 08 and 10 January organised by the Handball Union of Russia as a preparation of the host nation to the 2016 European Men's Handball Championship.

== Results ==
Team	Pld	W	D	L	GF	GA	GD	Pts
Russia	3	2	1	0	93	80	+13	5
Netherlands	3	1	1	1	90	86	+4	3
Argentina	3	1	0	2	70	86	–16	2
Belarus	3	0	2	1	90	89	–1	2

== Round robin ==
January 8; 15:00	Argentina	29 – 28	Belarus	Krylatskoye Sports Palace, Moscow
January 8; 15:00	Souto 5	(15–13)	Rutenka 9	Krylatskoye Sports Palace, Moscow
January 8; 15:00	2× (yellow card) 8× (suspension)	Report	3× (yellow card) 4× (suspension)	Krylatskoye Sports Palace, Moscow

January 8; 17:00	Russia	35 – 28	Netherlands	Krylatskoye Sports Palace, Moscow
January 8; 17:00	Buzmakov 8	(17–13)	Remer, Boomhouwer 4	Krylatskoye Sports Palace, Moscow
January 8; 17:00	3× (yellow card) 6× (suspension)	Report	3× (yellow card) 6× (suspension)	Krylatskoye Sports Palace, Moscow

January 9; 15:00	Belarus	34 – 34	Netherlands	Krylatskoye Sports Palace, Moscow
January 9; 15:00	Rutenka 10	(20–17)	Baart 7	Krylatskoye Sports Palace, Moscow
January 9; 15:00	2× (yellow card) 5× (suspension)	Report	2× (yellow card) 5× (suspension)	Krylatskoye Sports Palace, Moscow

January 9; 17:00	Russia	30 – 24	Argentina	Krylatskoye Sports Palace, Moscow
January 9; 17:00	Dibirov 8	(17–10)	Souto 5	Krylatskoye Sports Palace, Moscow
January 9; 17:00	2× (yellow card) 4× (suspension)	Report	3× (yellow card) 3× (suspension)	Krylatskoye Sports Palace, Moscow

January 10; 13:00	Netherlands	28 – 17	Argentina	Krylatskoye Sports Palace, Moscow
January 10; 13:00	Schagen 5	(14–8)	Vazquez 5	Krylatskoye Sports Palace, Moscow
January 10; 13:00	3× (yellow card) 1× (suspension)	Report	1× (yellow card) 4× (suspension)	Krylatskoye Sports Palace, Moscow

January 10; 15:00	Russia	28 – 28	Belarus	Krylatskoye Sports Palace, Moscow
January 10; 15:00	three players 5	(16–12)	Pukhouski 12	Krylatskoye Sports Palace, Moscow
January 10; 15:00	2× (yellow card) 2× (suspension)	Report	3× (yellow card) 3× (suspension)	Krylatskoye Sports Palace, Moscow

== Final standing ==
Rank	Team
Gold medal	Russia
2	Netherlands
3	Argentina
4	Belarus
