= 2016 Qatar International Handball Tournament =

2016 Qatar Inertantional Handball Tournament
Tournament details
- Host country: Qatar
- Venue: 1 (in 1 host city)
- Dates: 03–07 April
- Teams: 4 (from 2 confederations)

Final positions
- Champions: Qatar
- Runners-up: Brazil
- Third place: (Qatar) El Jaish
- Fourth place: Argentina

Tournament statistics
- Matches played: 6
- Goals scored: 310 (51.67 per match)

The 2016 Qatar International Handball Tournament was the 10th edition of the Qatar men's International Handball Tournament, held in Doha, Qatar between 03–7 April as a friendly handball tournament organised by the Qatar Handball Association as a preparation of the host nation to the 2016 Summer Olympics, Participated in the tournament the host nation, Qatar, the national teams of Brazil and Argentina, and the Qatari handball team El Jaish.

== Results ==
Team	Pld	W	D	L	GF	GA	GD	Pts
Qatar	3	3	0	0	97	71	26	6
Brazil	3	1	0	2	78	78	0	2
(Qatar) El Jaish	3	1	0	2	78	88	–10	2
Argentina	3	1	0	2	62	78	–16	2

== Round robin ==
April 3; 18:00	Qatar	34–24	(Qatar) El Jaish	Duhail Handball Sports Hall, Doha
April 3; 18:00		(17–11)		Duhail Handball Sports Hall, Doha

April 4; 18:00	Argentina	20–24	Brazil	Duhail Handball Sports Hall, Doha
April 4; 18:00		(11–9)		Duhail Handball Sports Hall, Doha

April 5; 16:00	El Jaish (Qatar)	28–26	Brazil	Duhail Handball Sports Hall, Doha
April 5; 16:00		(16–11)		Duhail Handball Sports Hall, Doha

April 5; 18:00	Qatar	33–19	Argentina	Duhail Handball Sports Hall, Doha
April 5; 18:00		(16–8)		Duhail Handball Sports Hall, Doha

April 6; 16:00	El Jaish (Qatar)	21–23	Argentina	Duhail Handball Sports Hall, Doha
April 6; 16:00		(13–13)		Duhail Handball Sports Hall, Doha

April 6; 18:00	Qatar	30–28	Brazil	Duhail Handball Sports Hall, Doha
April 6; 18:00		(15–14)		Duhail Handball Sports Hall, Doha

== Final standing ==
Rank	Team
Gold medal	Qatar
2	Brazil
3	(Qatar) El Jaish
4	Argentina
