= Handball Sassari =

Italian handball club

- Full name: Raimond Ego Handball Sassari
- Founded: 2017; 9 years ago
- Arena: PalaSantoru
- Capacity: 780
- President: Luana Morreale
- Head coach: Ratko Đurković
- League: Serie A Gold
- 2024-25: 5th
- Club colours

Raimond Ego handball Sassari is an Italian handball club from Sassari that plays in the Serie A Gold.

Location of Handball Sassari

== History ==
The Ichnusa Sassari handball club was founded in Sassari in 1977. The club operated from 1977-2015. In 2017, the club returns to the league after a two-year absence under the name Handball Sassari. Promoted from Serie A2 to Serie A in 2019, losing the A2 Italian Cup final. In the first season, they took fourth place in Serie A and qualified for the EHF European Cup. In the 2020–2021 season, they finished second in the league. On February 6, 2022, the team won its first trophy, the Italian Cup, defeating Conversano in the final.

== Team ==
=== Current squad ===
Squad for the 2025–26 season

Handball Sassari

Goalkeepers

- 1 (Italy) Giovanni Pavani
- 12 (Argentina) Federico Mihail
- 16 (Italy) Riccardo Fasanelli

Left Wingers

- 3 (Italy) Daniel Vidili
- 5 (Italy) Giovanni Nardin
- 17 (Italy) Matteo Bomboi
- 21 (Italy) Giovanni Delrio

Right Wingers

- 13 (Italy) Andrea Delogu

Line Players

- 7 (Italy) Raul Bargelli
- 60 (France) Marco Campagna

Left Backs

- 8 (France) Octave Touvrey
- 18 (France) Rohnan Conte-Prat

Central Backs

- 4 (Italy) Alberto Mura
- 9 (Argentina) Ignacio Bennardo
- 67 (Sweden) Albin Järlstam

Right Backs

- 11 (Italy) Davide Pugliese
- 24 (Italy) Alfonso Didone
- 44 (Cape Verde) Gualther Furtado

=== Technical staff ===
- Head coach: (Montenegro) Ratko Đurković
- Assistant coach: (Italy) Lorenzo Vosca

=== Transfers ===
Transfers for the 2025–26 season

Joining

- (North Macedonia) Tomche Stojanovski (LB) from (North Macedonia) GRK Tikveš

Leaving

- (France) Rohnan Conte-Prat (LB) to (France) US Ivry Handball

=== Transfer History ===
Transfers for the 2025–26 season

Joining

- (Sweden) Albin Järlstam (CB) from (Finland) Riihimäki Cocks
- Rohnan Conte-Prat (LB) from Tremblay-en-France Handball
- (France) Marco Campagna (LP) from (France) Sarrebourg Moselle-Sud Handball

Leaving

- (Italy) Enrico Aldini (LP) to (Spain) BM Rebi Cuenca

Transfers for the 2024–25 season

Joining

- (Bosnia and Herzegovina) Dino Hamidović (LB) from (Bosnia and Herzegovina) RK Gračanica
- (Chile) Aaron Codina Vivanco (CB) from (Italy) Polisportiva Cingoli
- (Morocco) Mohammed Miri (LP) from (Turkey) Sakarya BSB SK
- (Italy) Alex Coppola (LB) from (Italy) Carpi

Leaving

- (Italy) Valerio Sampaolo (GK) to (Italy) Publiesse Chiaravalle
- (Argentina) Tomás Della Vecchia (RB) to (Italy) Brixen
- (Italy) Christian Manojlović (LB) to (Romania) SCM Politehnica Timișoara
- (Germany) Jan Kleineidam (CB) to (Australia) Sydney University Handball Club
- (Bosnia and Herzegovina) Tarik Vranac (LB)
- (Bosnia and Herzegovina) Damir Halilović (LP)

== Previous squads ==
2021–2022 Team
Shirt No	Nationality	Player	Birth Date	Position
1	Italy	Marco Spanu	9 December 1998 (age 27)	Goalkeeper
2	ItalyBrazil	Allan Luis Pereira	9 March 1989 (age 37)	Left Back
4	Italy	Alberto Mura	24 January 2005 (age 21)	Central Back
5	Italy	Giovanni Nardin	15 April 2000 (age 26)	Left Winger
6	Italy	Fabio Del Prete	11 January 1986 (age 40)	Central Back
7	Italy	Raul Bargelli	14 June 1999 (age 27)	Line Player
8	Argentina	Leonardo Facundo Querín	17 April 1982 (age 44)	Right Back
12	Italy	Paolo Giuffrida	9 December 2004 (age 21)	Goalkeeper
13	Italy	Andrea Delogu	18 July 2003 (age 23)	Right Winger
15	Bosnia and Herzegovina	Damir Halilković	10 May 1992 (age 34)	Line Player
16	Italy	Alessandro Leban	20 October 1998 (age 27)	Goalkeeper
17	Italy	Matteo Bomboi	8 July 1992 (age 34)	Left Winger
18	Italy	Paolo Bardi	18 August 1999 (age 27)	Central Back
20	Italy	Lorenzo Vosca	17 January 1976 (age 50)	Central Back
21	Italy	Andrea Giordo	8 March 1983 (age 43)	Goalkeeper
23	Italy	Umberto Bronzo	29 December 2000 (age 25)	Right Winger
30	Italy	Ogo Francesco Mbaye	21 June 1989 (age 37)	Left Back
33	ItalyCroatia	Bruno Brzić	10 February 1987 (age 39)	Central Back
45	Croatia	Jakov Vrdoljak	1 November 1996 (age 29)	Left Back

== Titles ==
- Italian Cup
  - Winner (1) : 2022
- Italian Supercup
  - Winner (1) : 2023
  - Runner-up (1)': 2022

== EHF ranking ==
As of 03/04/2025

Rank	Team	Points
105	(Czech Republic) SKPP Brno	48
106	(Kosovo) KH Besa Famgas	47
107	(Belgium) Achilles Bocholt	47
108	(Italy) Handball Sassari	46
109	(Poland) KS Azoty-Puławy	46
110	(Israel) Holon Yuvalym	45
111	(Finland) Riihimäki Cocks	45

== Former club members ==
=== Notable former players ===
- (Italy) Umberto Bronzo (2021-2023)
- (Italy) Riccardo Stabellini (2019-2021)
- (Italy) (Croatia) Bruno Brzić (2019-)
- (Italy) (Slovenia) Demis Radovčić (2005–2006)
- (Argentina) Leonardo Facundo Querín (2021-2023)
- (Argentina) Federico Matías Vieyra (2020-2021)
- (Estonia) Mikk Pinnonen (2018-2019)
