= Leonardo Facundo Querín =

Argentine handball player (born 1982)

Leonardo Facundo Querin
Personal information
- Born: 17 April 1982 (age 44) Buenos Aires, Argentina
- Height: 1.97 m (6 ft 6 in)

Sport
- Sport: Handball
- Position: Right back
- Current club: Handall Club Pamiers
National team
Years	Team	Apps	(Gls)
–	Argentina	189	(244)
Medal record
Pan American Games
Gold medal – first place	2011 Guadalajara	Team
Silver medal – second place	2007 Rio de Janeiro	Team
Silver medal – second place	2015 Toronto	Team
Pan American Championship
Bronze medal – third place	2016 Argentina

Leonardo Facundo Querin (born 17 April 1982) is an Argentine handball player for Handball Sassari and the Argentina men's national handball team.

He defended Argentina at the 2012 London Summer Olympics, and at the 2015 World Men's Handball Championship in Qatar.
