= Gonzalo Carou =

Argentine handball player

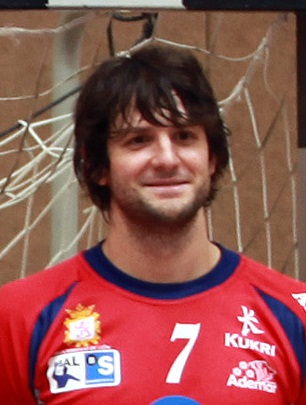
- Carou in 2010

Personal information
- Full name: Gonzalo Matias Carou
- Born: 15 August 1979 (age 47) Buenos Aires, Argentina
- Height: 1.90 m (6 ft 3 in)

Sport
- Sport: Handball
- Position: Pivot
- Current club: Ademar León
- Number: 7
National team
Years	Team	Apps	(Gls)
–	Argentina	246	(514)
Medal record
Pan American Games
Gold medal – first place	2011 Guadalajara	Team
Gold medal – first place	2019 Lima	Team
Silver medal – second place	2003 Santo Domingo	Team
Silver medal – second place	2007 Rio de Janeiro	Team
Silver medal – second place	2015 Toronto	Team
Pan American Championship
Gold medal – first place	2018 Greenland
Bronze medal – third place	2016 Argentina
South American Games
Silver medal – second place	2018 Cochabamba	Team

Gonzalo Matias Carou (born 15 August 1979) is an Argentine handball player for Ademar León and the Argentina men's national handball team.

He defended Argentina at the 2012 London Summer Olympics, at 11 World Handball Championships (including the 2021 World Men's Handball Championship in Egypt), which is a sport record.
