= Erik Caniu =

Chilean handball player (born 1988)

Personal information
- Nationality: Chilean
- Born: 2 October 1988 (age 38)
- Height: 1.85 m (6 ft 1 in)

Sport
- Sport: Handball
- Position: Right wing
- Current club: Luterano
National team
Years	Team	Apps	(Gls)
–	Chile	10	(13)
Medal record
Pan American Games
Bronze medal – third place	2015 Toronto	Team
Pan American Championship
Silver medal – second place	2016 Argentina

Erik Caniu (born 2 October 1988) is a Chilean handball player for Luterano and the Chilean national team.
