= Sergio Crevatín =

Argentine handball player

Sergio Crevatin
Personal information
- Nationality: Argentine
- Born: 28 May 1980 (age 46)
- Height: 1.86 m (6 ft 1 in)

Sport
- Sport: Handball
- Position: Pivot
- Current club: SAG LOMAS
National team
Years	Team	Apps	(Gls)
–	Argentina	112	(153)
Medal record
Pan American Games
Silver medal – second place	2003 Santo Domingo	Team
Silver medal – second place	2007 Rio de Janeiro	Team
Silver medal – second place	2015 Toronto	Team
Pan American Championship
Bronze medal – third place	2016 Argentina

Sergio Crevatin (born 28 May 1980) is an Argentine handball player. He plays for SAG LOMAS and competed for the Argentine national team at the 2015 World Men's Handball Championship in Qatar.
