= Michał Daszek =

Polish handball player (born 1992)

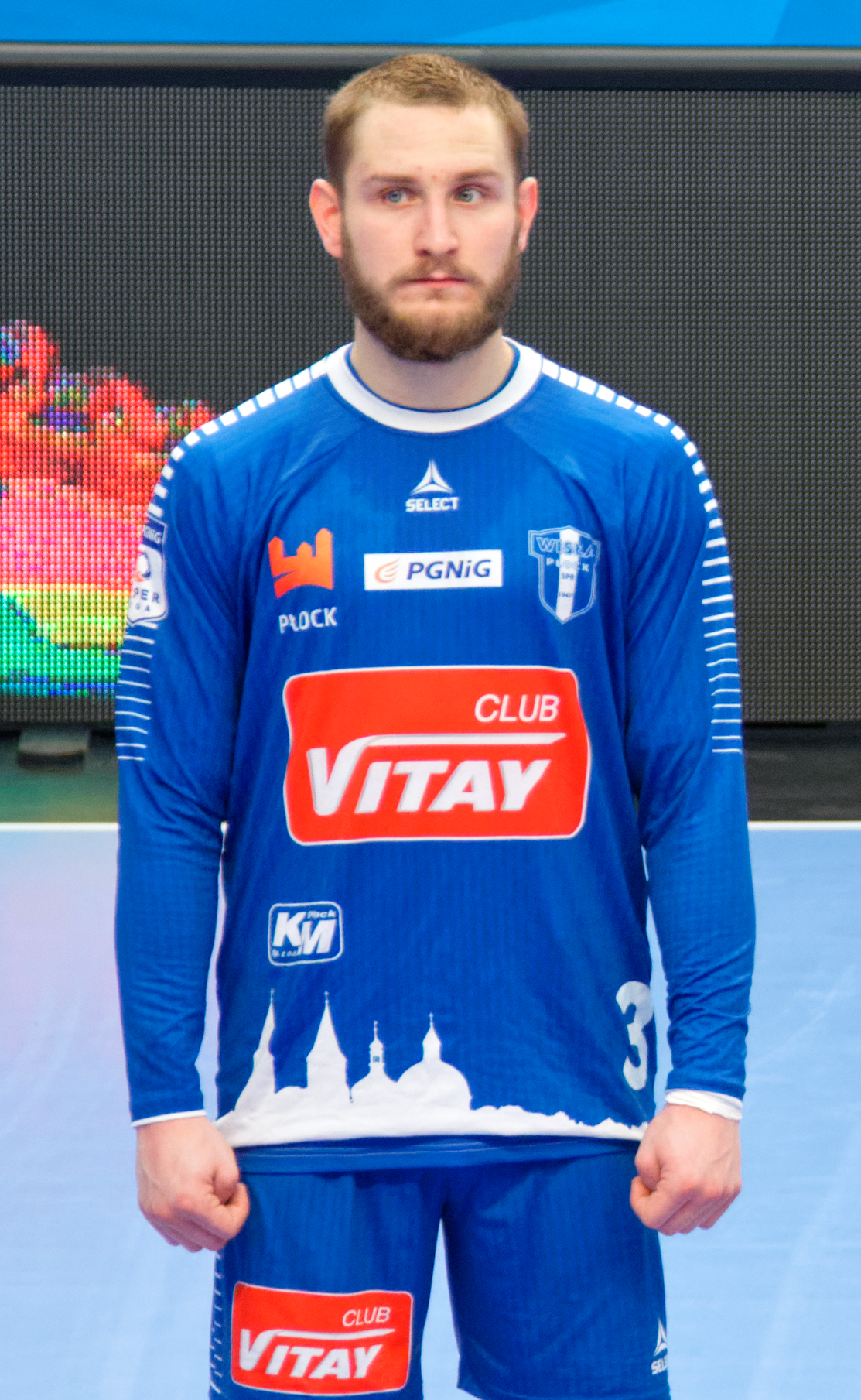

Personal information
- Nationality: Polish
- Born: 27 June 1992 (age 34) Tczew, Poland
- Height: 1.82 m (6 ft 0 in)

Sport
- Sport: Handball
- Position: Right back/wing
- Current club: Wisła Płock
- Number: 3

Youth career
- Years: Team
- –2008: Sambor Tczew

Senior clubs
- Years: Team
- 2008–2011: SMS Gdańsk
- 2011–2014: MMTS Kwidzyn
- 2014–: Wisła Płock
National team
Years	Team	Apps	(Gls)
2013–	Poland	155	(398)
Medal record
World Championship
Bronze medal – third place	2015 Qatar
- Updated on 14 January 2026

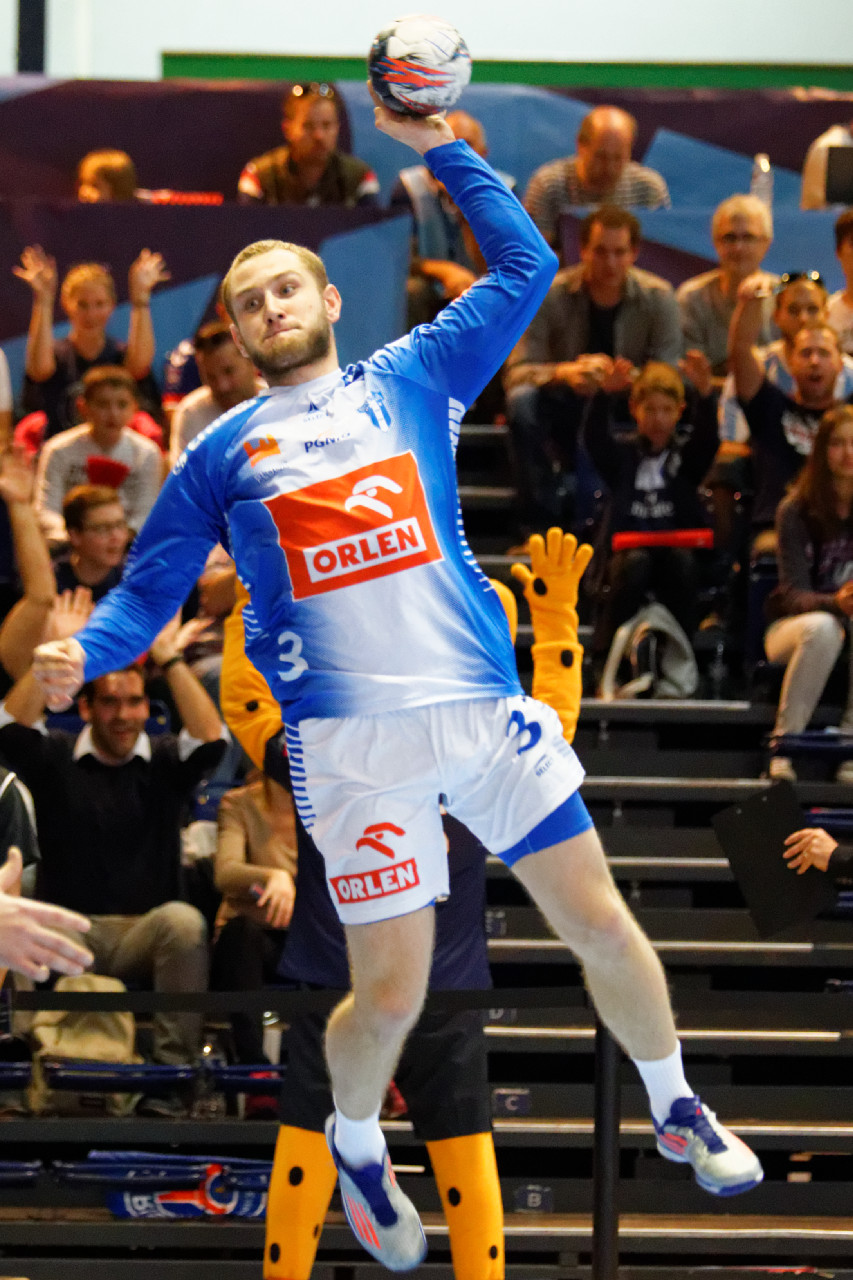
Michał Daszek trying to score from the right wing

Michał Daszek (born 27 June 1992) is a Polish handball player for Wisła Płock and the Polish national team.

== Career ==
From 2011 to 2014, he played for MMTS Kwidzyn. In 2014, he joined Wisła Płock. He is well known to be able to play at two positions, right wing for Wisła Płock and right back for the Polish national team.

On 1 February 2015, Poland, including Daszek, won the bronze medal of the 2015 World Championship. He also participated in the 2016 Summer Olympics in Rio de Janeiro, in the men's handball tournament.

== State awards ==
- 2015 Silver Cross of Merit
