= Fernando Gabriel García =

Argentine handball player

Fernando Gabriel Garcia
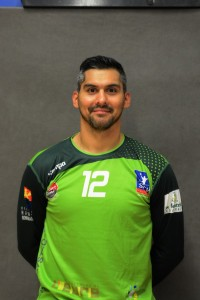

Personal information
- Born: 31 August 1981 (age 45) Buenos Aires, Argentina
- Height: 1.90 m (6 ft 3 in)

Sport
- Sport: Handball
- Position: Goalkeeper
- Current club: Vernon
- Number: 12
National team
Years	Team	Apps	(Gls)
–	Argentina	198	(5)
Medal record
Pan American Games
Gold medal – first place	2011 Guadalajara	Team
Silver medal – second place	2015 Toronto	Team
Pan American Championship
Bronze medal – third place	2016 Argentina

Fernando Gabriel Garcia (born 31 August 1981) is an Argentine handball player for Vernon and the Argentina men's national handball team.

He defended Argentina at the 2012 London Summer Olympics, and at the 2015 World Men's Handball Championship in Qatar.
