= Federico Matías Vieyra =

Argentine handball player

Federico Matias Vieyra
Personal information
- Born: 21 July 1988 (age 38) Buenos Aires, Argentina
- Height: 1.92 m (6 ft 4 in)

Sport
- Sport: Handball
- Position: Right back
- Current club: Sassari
National team
Years	Team	Apps	(Gls)
2010-	Argentina	197	(407)
Medal record
Pan American Games
Gold medal – first place	2011 Guadalajara	Team
Silver medal – second place	2015 Toronto	Team
Pan American Championship
Gold medal – first place	2018 Greenland
Bronze medal – third place	2016 Argentina
South American Games
Silver medal – second place	2018 Cochabamba	Team

Federico Matias Vieyra (born 21 July 1988) is an Argentine handball player for Handball Sassari and the Argentina men's national handball team.

He defended Argentina at the 2012 London Summer Olympics, the 2016 Rio de Janeiro Summer Olympics in Rio, and the 2015 World Men's Handball Championship in Qatar.
