= Argentina men's national handball team =

Men's national handball team representing Argentina

Argentina

Information
- Nickname: Los Gladiadores (The Gladiators)
- Association: Confederación Argentina de Handball
- Coach: Rodolfo Jung
- Assistant coach: Cristian Campos
- Most caps: Gonzalo Carou (240)
- Most goals: Federico Pizarro (610)

Colours
1st	2nd

Results

Summer Olympics
- Appearances: 4 (First in 2012)
- Best result: 10th (2012, 2016)

World Championship
- Appearances: 15 (First in 1997)
- Best result: 11th (2021)

Pan American Championship
- Appearances: 16 (First in 1980)
- Best result: (gold) 1st (2000, 2002, 2004, 2010, 2012, 2014, 2018)
- Last updated on Unknown.

The Argentina national handball team is the national handball team of Argentina and is controlled by the Argentina Handball Association.

== Tournament results ==
=== Olympic Games ===
Games	Round	Position	Pld	W	D	L	GF	GA	GD
(Germany) 1936 Berlin	did not enter								
1948–1968	Not held								
(West Germany) 1972 Munich	did not qualify								
(Canada) 1976 Montreal	did not qualify								
(Soviet Union) 1980 Moscow	did not qualify								
(United States) 1984 Los Angeles	did not qualify								
(South Korea) 1988 Seoul	did not qualify								
(Spain) 1992 Barcelona	did not qualify								
(United States) 1996 Atlanta	did not qualify								
(Australia) 2000 Sydney	did not qualify								
(Greece) 2004 Athens	did not qualify								
(China) 2008 Beijing	did not qualify								
(United Kingdom) 2012 London	preliminary round	10th of 12	5	1	0	4	113	138	−25
(Brazil) 2016 Rio de Janeiro	preliminary round	10th of 12	5	1	0	4	110	126	−16
(Japan) 2020 Tokyo	preliminary round	12th of 12	5	0	0	5	125	154	−29
(France) 2024 Paris	preliminary round	12th of 12	5	0	0	5	131	171	−40
Total	4/15		20	2	0	18	479	589	-110

=== World Championship ===
Year	Round	Position	GP	W	D*	L	GF	GA
(Nazi Germany) 1938	did not enter							
(Sweden) 1954	did not enter							
(East Germany) 1958	did not enter							
(West Germany) 1961	did not enter							
(Czechoslovakia) 1964	did not enter							
(Sweden) 1967	did not enter							
(France) 1970	did not enter							
(East Germany) 1974	did not enter							
(Denmark) 1978	did not enter							
(West Germany) 1982	did not enter							
(Switzerland) 1986	did not enter							
(Czechoslovakia) 1990	did not enter							
(Sweden) 1993	did not enter							
(Iceland) 1995	did not enter							
(Japan) 1997	preliminary round	22	5	0	0	5	96	140
(Egypt) 1999	preliminary round	21	5	0	1	4	96	129
(France) 2001	round of 16	15	6	2	1	3	117	150
(Portugal) 2003	preliminary round	17	5	1	1	3	127	156
(Tunisia) 2005	preliminary round	18	5	1	0	4	133	141
(Germany) 2007	presidents cup	16	6	2	0	4	138	167
(Croatia) 2009	presidents cup	18	9	3	0	6	231	245
(Sweden) 2011	main round	12	9	3	1	5	235	247
(Spain) 2013	presidents cup	18	7	2	0	5	169	193
(Qatar) 2015	round of 16	12	6	2	1	3	152	156
(France) 2017	presidents cup	18	7	2	0	5	154	183
(Denmark) / (Germany) 2019	presidents cup	17	7	3	1	3	173	180
(Egypt) 2021	main round	11	6	4	0	2	148	143
(Poland) (Sweden) 2023	main round	19	6	2	0	4	142	176
(Croatia) (Denmark) (Norway) 2025	main round	20	6	2	0	4	143	187
(Germany) 2027	Qualified							
(France) (Germany) 2029	TBD							
(Denmark) (Iceland) (Norway) 2031	TBD							
Total	16/32		95	29	6	60	2254	2593

=== Pan American Games ===
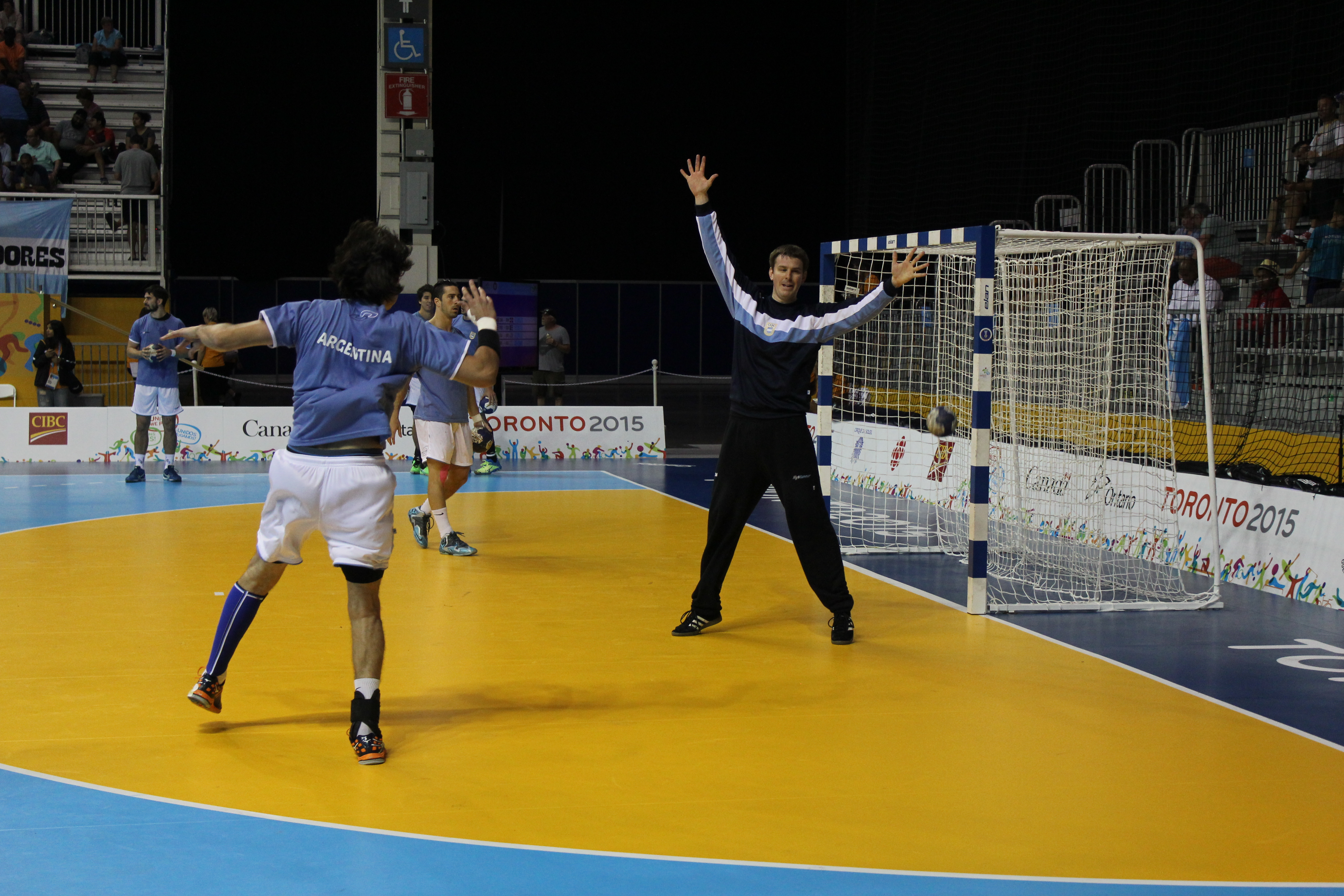
Detail from gold medal match against Brazil, 2015 Toronto

Games	Round	Position	Pld	W	D	L	GF	GA	GD
(United States) 1987 Indianapolis	group round	5th	4	0	0	4	56	100	−44
(Cuba) 1991 Havana	group round	5th	4	1	0	3	72	96	−24
(Argentina) 1995 Mar del Plata	bronze medal match	3rd	6	4	0	2	131	96	35
(Canada) 1999 Winnipeg	bronze medal match	3rd	5	4	0	1	135	84	51
(Dominican Republic) 2003 Santo Domingo	gold medal match	2nd	5	4	0	1	185	98	87
(Brazil) 2007 Rio de Janeiro	gold medal match	2nd	5	4	0	1	170	116	54
(Mexico) 2011 Guadalajara	gold medal match	1st	5	5	0	0	147	103	44
(Canada) 2015 Toronto	gold medal match	2nd	5	4	0	1	150	104	46
(Peru) 2019 Lima	gold medal match	1st	5	5	0	0	157	116	41
(Chile) 2023 Santiago	gold medal match	1st	5	5	0	0	158	101	57
Total	10/10	3 Titles	49	36	0	13	1361	1014	347

=== Pan American Championship ===
Year	Round	Position	GP	W	D*	L	GF	GA
(Mexico) 1980	round robin	5	5	1	0	4	75	99
(Argentina) 1981	3rd place match	4	5	3	0	2	137	111
(United States) 1983	did not enter							
(Brazil) 1985	round robin	4	5	1	0	4	86	122
(Cuba) 1989	did not enter							
(Brazil) 1994	round robin	4	6	3	0	3	151	104
(United States) 1996	final	2	5	3	0	2	119	100
(Cuba) 1998	final	2	6	5	0	1	162	105
(Brazil) 2000	final	1	5	5	0	0	123	93
(Argentina) 2002	final	1	5	5	0	0	139	70
(Chile) 2004	final	1	5	5	0	0	153	87
(Brazil) 2006	final	2	5	4	0	1	162	100
(Brazil) 2008	final	2	5	4	0	1	150	121
(Chile) 2010	final	1	5	5	0	0	142	79
(Argentina) 2012	final	1	6	5	1	0	177	103
(Uruguay) 2014	final	1	5	5	0	0	160	90
(Argentina) 2016	3rd place match	3	7	5	0	2	210	124
(Greenland) 2018	final	1	6	6	0	0	236	195
Total	16/18	7 titles	86	65	1	20	2489	1873

=== South and Central American Championship ===
Year	Round	Position	GP	W	D*	L	GF	GA
(Brazil) 2020	final	1	5	5	0	0	220	91
(Brazil) 2022	final	2	4	3	0	1	166	70
(Argentina) 2024	final	2	5	3	1	1	173	101
(Paraguay) 2026	final	1	5	5	0	0	192	98
Total	4/4	2 titles	19	14	1	2	751	360

=== Other competitions ===
South American Games
Games	Round	Position	Pld	W	D	L	GF	GA	GD
(Brazil) 2002 São Paulo	Gold medal match	1st	5	5	0	0	139	69	70
(Argentina) 2006 Buenos Aires	Gold medal match	1st	5	5	0	0	168	76	92
(Colombia) 2010 Medellin	round robin	2nd	4	3	0	1	133	94	39
(Chile) 2014 Santiago	gold medal match	2nd	4	3	0	1	111	78	33
(Bolivia) 2018 Cochabamba	gold medal match	2nd	4	3	0	1	118	79	39
(Paraguay) 2022 Asunción	round robin	1st	4	4	0	0	151	79	72
(Argentina) 2026 Santa Fe	round robin	1st	5	4	1	0	144	89	55
Total	7/7	4 Titles	31	27	1	3	964	564	400

- 2014 Four Nations Tournament – 3rd
- 2015 Provident Kupa – 2nd
- 2016 Christmas Handball Tournament of Four – 3rd
- 2016 Qatar International Handball Tournament – 4th
- 2017 International Tournament of Spain – 4th
- 2017 Four Nations Tournament – 2nd
- 2018 International Tournament of Spain – 3rd
- 2019 Four Nations Handball Tournament –
- 2023 International Tournament of Spain – 3rd
- 2023 Four Nations Handball Tournament –
- 2024 Yellow Cup - 3rd
- 2025 International Tournament of Spain – 4th

== Team ==
=== Current squad ===
Roster for the 2025 World Men's Handball Championship.

Head coach: Rodolfo Jung

No.	Pos.	Name	Date of birth (age)	Height	App.	Goals	Club
1	GK	Santiago Giovagnola	28 December 1999 (age 26)	1.83 m	2	0	(Spain) Balonmano Caserio
3	LB	Santiago Barceló	5 September 2002 (age 24)	1.91 m	19	28	(Spain) BM Ciudad Encantada
4	CB	Nicolás Bono	16 August 1997 (age 29)	1.80 m	32	53	(France) Istres Provence
7	LB	Juan Gull	19 May 2004 (age 22)	2.06 m	27	75	(Spain) Balonmano Caserio
9	LB	Tomás Cañete	14 January 1999 (age 27)	1.88 m	2	2	(Italy) SSV Brixen Handball
10	LW	Ramiro Benacedo	21 March 2002 (age 24)	1.88 m	7	22	(Argentina) Colegio Ward
11	P	Lucas Moscariello	19 February 1992 (age 34)	1.90 m	115	246	(Spain) BM Benidorm
18	P	Guillermo Fischer	18 July 1996 (age 30)	2.00 m	63	51	(Spain) BM Villa de Aranda
19	CB	Pedro Martínez	20 December 1999 (age 26)	1.90 m	68	140	(Portugal) Sporting CP
20	RW	Ramiro Martínez	22 July 1995 (age 31)	1.81 m	65	166	(Spain) BM Benidorm
23	CB	Martín Jung	3 September 2002 (age 24)	1.88 m	9	23	(France) US Ivry Handball
25	RW	Facundo Cangiani	23 April 1991 (age 35)	1.82 m	59	84	(Spain) Balonmano Torrelavega
27	P	Pablo Minguez	24 January 1991 (age 35)	1.92 m	0	0	(Spain) Balonmano Caserio
28	RW	Juan Saco	28 January 2002 (age 24)	1.89 m	10	28	(Spain) CB Triana
40	GK	Leonel Maciel	4 January 1989 (age 37)	1.92 m	140	17	(Spain) CD Bidasoa
77	RB	Lucas Aizen	5 February 1998 (age 28)	1.91 m	24	39	(Spain) BM Puente Genil

=== Statistics ===
Most Appearances
Name	Matches	Position
Federico Pizarro	252	W/OB
Gonzalo Carou	240	P
Federico Gastón Fernández	218	W
Matías Schulz	203	GK
Andrés Kogovsek	196	W
Sebastián Simonet	195	CB
Federico Matías Vieyra	190	OB
Fernando Gabriel García	186	GK
Leonardo Facundo Querín	152	OB
Damián Migueles	148	OB
Diego Simonet	144	CB
Pablo Simonet	140	OB
Leonel Maciel	131	GK
Pablo Sebastián Portela	129	P
Juan Pablo Fernández	121	CB
Eric Gull	115	OB
Sergio Crevatin	112	P

Top Scorers
Name	Goals	Position
Federico Pizarro	825	W/OB
Federico Gastón Fernández	790	W
Gonzalo Carou	513	P
Diego Simonet	450	CB
Sebastián Simonet	412	CB
Federico Matías Vieyra	407	OB
Pablo Simonet	309	OB
Ignacio Pizarro	307	W
Leonardo Facundo Querín	230	OB
Eric Gull	200+	OB

=== Notable players ===
- Eric Gull
- Andrés Kogovsek
