= Pablo Simonet =

Argentine handball player

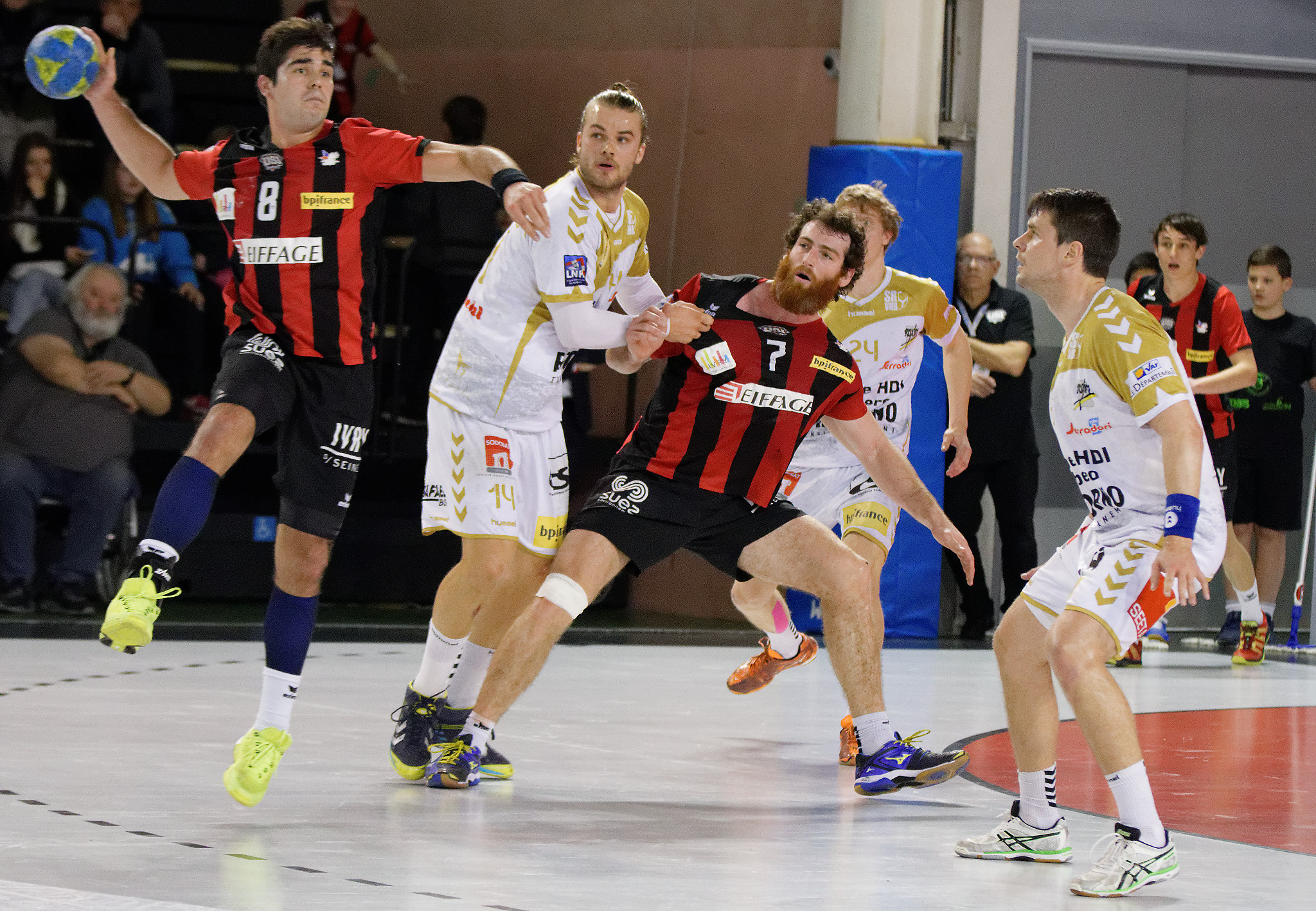
- Simonet in 2016

Personal information
- Full name: Pablo Ariel Simonet Moldes
- Born: 4 May 1992 (age 34) Vicente López, Argentina
- Height: 1.84 m (6 ft 0 in)

Sport
- Sport: Handball
- Position: Left back
- Current club: Ángel Ximénez Puente Genil
- Number: 4

Youth career
- Years: Team
- –2011: SAG de Villa Ballester

Senior clubs
- Years: Team
- 2011–1/2012: SAG de Villa Ballester
- 1/2012–2013: BM Ciudad Encantada
- 2013–2016: US Ivry HB
- 2016–2020: BM Benidorm
- 2020–2024: BM Ciudad Encantada
- 2024–: Ángel Ximénez Puente Genil
National team
Years	Team	Apps	(Gls)
2012–	Argentina	159	(359)
Medal record
Pan American Games
Gold medal – first place	2019 Lima	Team
Gold medal – first place	2023 Santiago	Team
Silver medal – second place	2015 Toronto	Team
Pan American Championship
Gold medal – first place	2018 Greenland
Bronze medal – third place	2016 Argentina
South and Central American Championship
Gold medal – first place	2020 Brazil
Silver medal – second place	2024 Argentina
South American Games
Gold medal – first place	2022 Asunción	Team
Silver medal – second place	2018 Cochabamba	Team
- Updated on 27 January 2025

Pablo Ariel Simonet Moldes (born 4 May 1992) is an Argentine handball player for BM Benidorm and the Argentina men's national handball team.

He defended Argentina at the 2015 World Men's Handball Championship in Qatar.

Two of his brothers, Sebastian and Diego, defended Argentina at the Olympics and World Championships competitions in handball.
