= Sebastián Simonet =

Argentine handball player

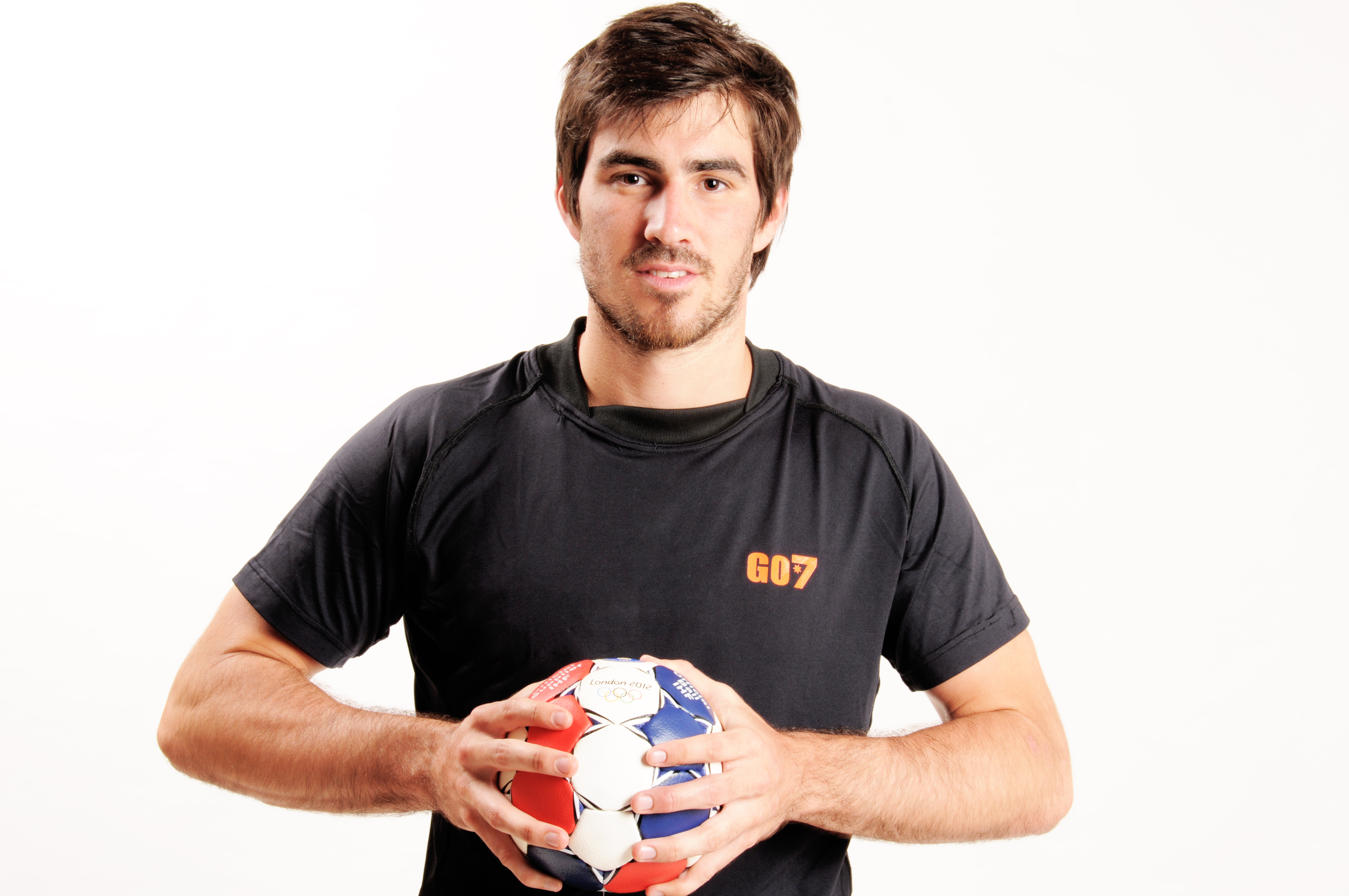

Personal information
- Full name: Sebastián Alejandro Simonet Moldes
- Born: 12 May 1986 (age 40) Vicente López, Argentina
- Height: 1.90 m (6 ft 3 in)

Sport
- Sport: Handball
- Position: Centre back
- Current club: Ademar León
- Number: 4
National team
Years	Team	Apps	(Gls)
–	Argentina	162	(361)
Medal record
Pan American Games
Gold medal – first place	2011 Guadalajara	Team
Gold medal – first place	2019 Lima	Team
Silver medal – second place	2015 Toronto	Team
Pan American Championship
Gold medal – first place	2018 Greenland
Bronze medal – third place	2016 Argentina
South and Central American Championship
Gold medal – first place	2020 Brazil
South American Games
Silver medal – second place	2018 Cochabamba	Team

Sebastián Alejandro Simonet Moldes (born 12 May 1986) is an Argentine handball player for Ademar León and the Argentina men's national handball team.

He defended Argentina at the 2012 London Summer Olympics, along with his younger brother Diego, and the 2015 World Men's Handball Championship in Qatar.

Two of his brothers, Pablo and Diego, have defended Argentina at handball Olympic and World Championship competitions.

== Individual awards and achievements ==
- 2016 Pan American Men's Handball Championship: Best playmaker
- 2018 Pan American Men's Handball Championship: Best playmaker
