= Diego Simonet =

Argentine handball player

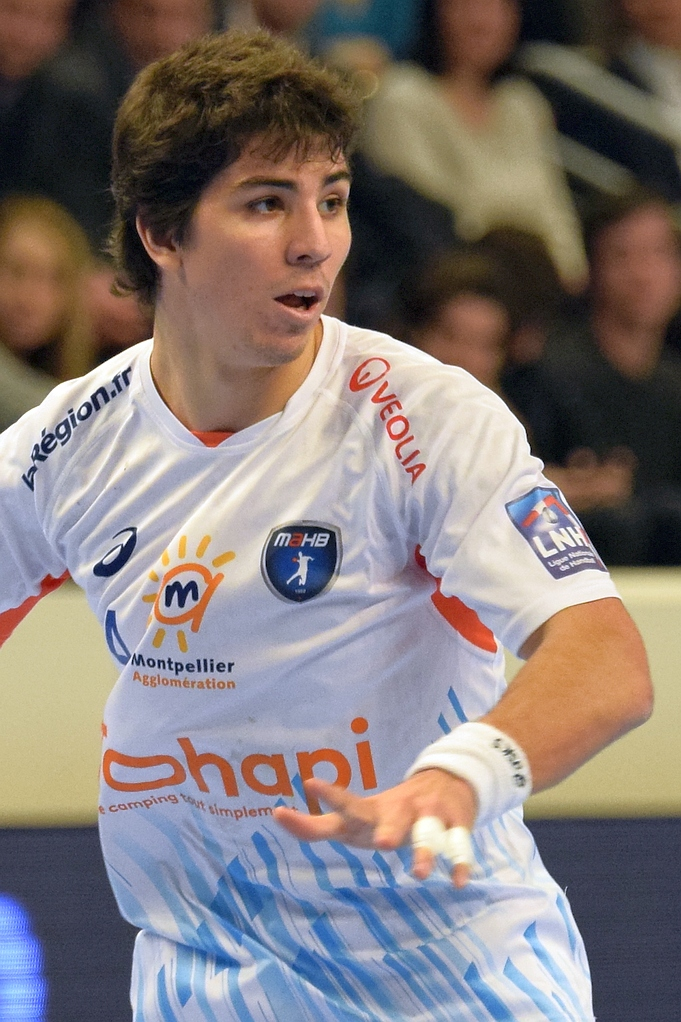
- Simonet in 2014

Personal information
- Full name: Diego Esteban Simonet Moldes
- Born: 26 December 1989 (age 36) Vicente López, Argentina
- Height: 1.89 m (6 ft 2 in)

Sport
- Sport: Handball
- Position: Centre back
- Current club: Montpellier Handball
- Number: 4

Senior clubs
- Years: Team
- –2007: Sociedad Alemana de Villa Ballester
- 2007–2009: Sao Caetano HC
- 2009–2011: CB Torrevieja
- 2011–2013: US Ivry Handball
- 2013–: Montpellier Handball
National team
Years	Team	Apps	(Gls)
2010–	Argentina	144	(458)
Medal record
Pan American Games
Gold medal – first place	2011 Guadalajara	Team
Gold medal – first place	2019 Lima	Team
Gold medal – first place	2023 Santiago	Team
Silver medal – second place	2015 Toronto	Team
Pan American Championship
Gold medal – first place	2012 Argentina
Gold medal – first place	2014 Uruguay
Bronze medal – third place	2016 Argentina
Gold medal – first place	2018 Greenland
South and Central American Championship
Gold medal – first place	2020 Brazil
Silver medal – second place	2022 Brazil
Silver medal – second place	2024 Argentina
South American Games
Gold medal – first place	2022 Asunción	Team
Silver medal – second place	2018 Cochabamba	Team
- Updated on 7 September 2024

Diego Esteban Simonet Moldes (Note: In this Spanish name, the first or paternal surname is Simonet and the second or maternal family name is Moldes.) (born 26 December 1989) is an Argentine handball player for Montpellier and the Argentina men's national handball team.

He represented Argentina at the 2011 World Men's Handball Championship in Sweden, 2012 London Summer Olympics, 2013 World Men's Handball Championship in Spain and 2015 World Men's Handball Championship in Qatar. His action defending Argentina brought home six continental championships (2000, 2002, 2004, 2010, 2012, and 2014).

Two of his brothers, Sebastian and Pablo, defended Argentina at Olympic and World Championship competitions.

== Accomplishments ==
=== Clubs ===
International competitions

- EHF Champions League:
  - Winner (1): 2017–18
- EHF European League:
  - Runner-up (2): 2014, 2025

National competitions

- LNH Division 1: (14)
  - Runner-up (5) : 2015, 2018, 2019, 2021, 2023
- Coupe de la Ligue
  - Winner (2): 2014, 2016
  - Runner-up (1) : 2019
- Coupe de France
  - Winner (12): 2016, 2025
  - Runner-up (3) : 2012, 2017, 2023
- Trophée des Champions
  - Winner (2): 2018, 2025
  - Runner-up (1) : 2019

=== National team ===
see infobox

== Awards and recognition ==
- Argentinian Handballer of the Year (7): 2009, 2013, 2014, 2015, 2017, 2018, 2023.
- MVP of the EHF Champions League Final 4 in 2018
- best centre back of LNH Division 1(2) : 2014, 2015
- best centre back of South and Central American Championship (1): 2020
