= Fábio Chiuffa =

Brazilian handball player (born 1989)

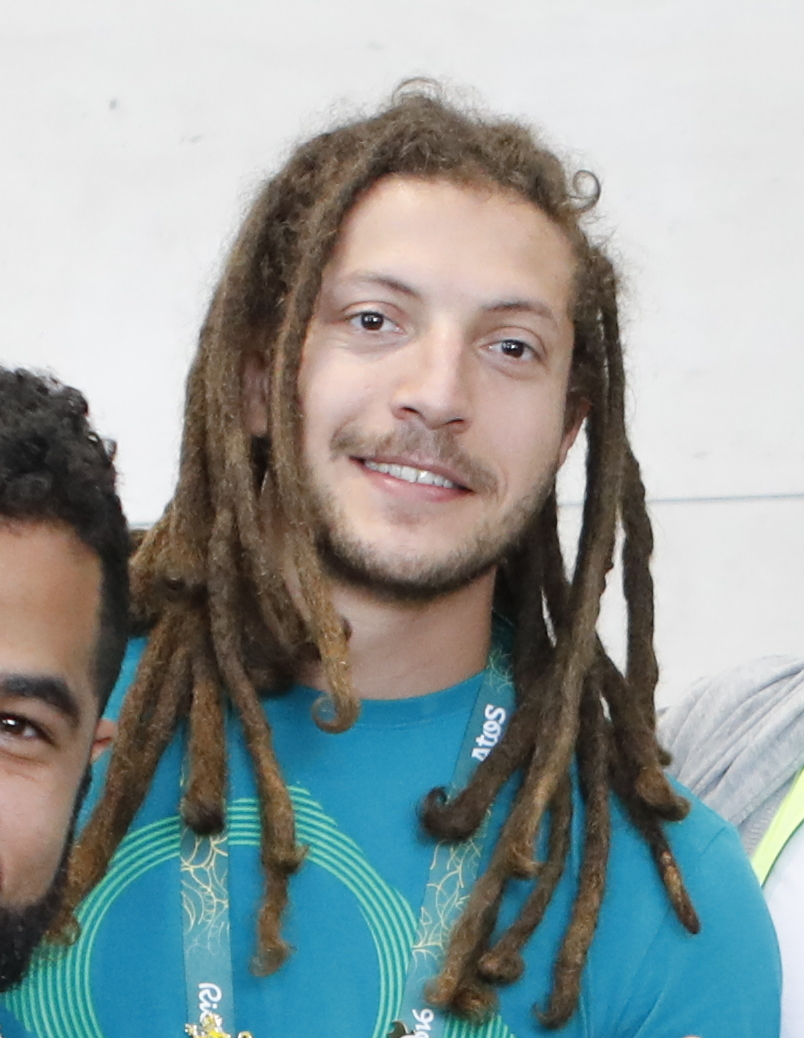
- Chiuffa in 2016

Personal information
- Full name: Fábio Rocha Chiuffa
- Born: 10 March 1989 (age 37) Promissão, Brazil
- Height: 1.87 m (6 ft 2 in)

Sport
- Sport: Handball
- Position: Right wing
- Current club: HC Dobrogea Sud

Senior clubs
- Years: Team
- –2014: Metodista/Sao Bernardo
- 2014–2016: Quabit Guadalajara
- 2016–2017: KIF Kolding København
- 2017–2018: CBM Logroño La Rioja
- 2018–2019: Sporting CP
- 2019–2021: HC Dobrogea Sud
- 2021–2022: Nice Handball
- 2022–: BM Guadalajara
National team
Years	Team	Apps	(Gls)
–	Brazil	171	(449)
Medal record
Pan American Games
Gold medal – first place	2015 Toronto	Team
Silver medal – second place	2011 Guadalajara	Team
Bronze medal – third place	2019 Lima	Team
Pan American Championship
Gold medal – first place	2016 Argentina
Silver medal – second place	2018 Greenland
South and Central American Championship
Gold medal – first place	2022 Brazil
Silver medal – second place	2020 Brazil
South American Games
Gold medal – first place	2018 Cochabamba	Team
- Updated on 28. January 2023

Fábio Rocha Chiuffa (born 10 March 1989) is a Brazilian handball player who plays for HC Dobrogea Sud and the Brazilian handball team.

He won two gold medals at the Pan American Games and competed at the 2016 Olympics.

== Individual awards and achievements ==
- 2016 Pan American Men's Handball Championship: Best right wing
- 2018 Pan American Men's Handball Championship: Best right wing, top scorer
- 2020 South and Central American Men's Handball Championship: Best right wing
