= Matías Schulz =

Argentine handball player

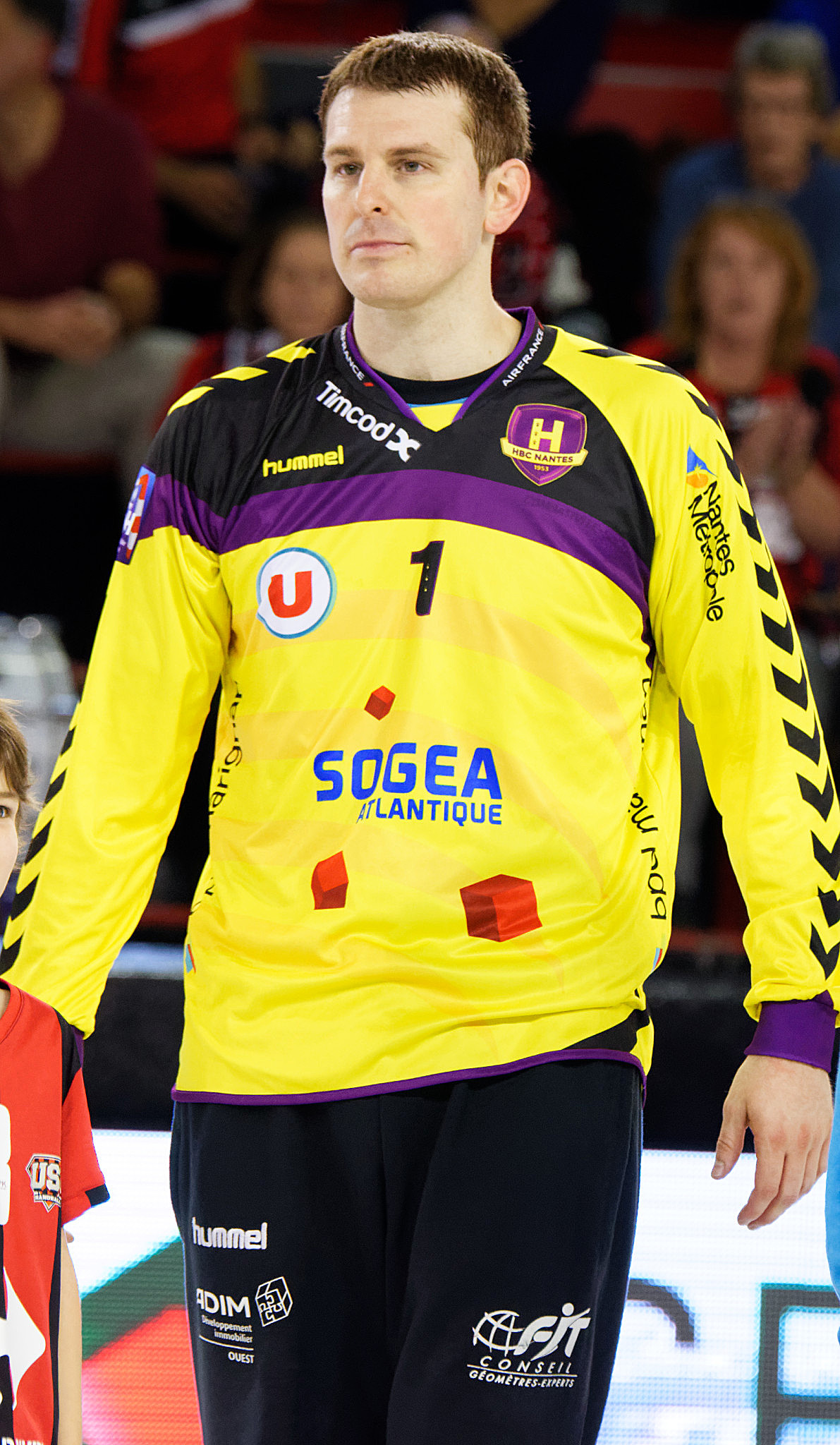

Personal information
- Full name: Matías Carlos Schulz
- Born: 12 February 1982 (age 44) Buenos Aires, Argentina
- Height: 1.90 m (6 ft 3 in)

Sport
- Sport: Handball
- Position: Goalkeeper
- Current club: Pfadi Winterthur
- Number: 1

Senior clubs
- Years: Team
- 2008–2009: Helvetia Anaitasuna
- 2009–2010: Antequera
- 2010–2011: Pines Badajoz
- 2011–2013: Helvetia Anaitasuna
- 2013–2014: BM Granollers
- 2014–2016: HBC Nantes
- 2016–: Pfadi Winterthur
National team
Years	Team	Apps	(Gls)
2001–	Argentina	203	(4)
Medal record
Pan American Games
Gold medal – first place	2011 Guadalajara	Team
Gold medal – first place	2019 Lima	Team
Silver medal – second place	2007 Rio de Janeiro	Team
Silver medal – second place	2015 Toronto	Team
Pan American Championship
Gold medal – first place	2018 Greenland
Bronze medal – third place	2016 Argentina
South and Central American Championship
Gold medal – first place	2020 Brazil
South American Games
Silver medal – second place	2018 Cochabamba	Team

Matías Carlos Schulz (born 12 February 1982) is an Argentine handball goalkeeper for Pfadi Winterthur and the Argentina men's national handball team.

He defended Argentina at the 2012 London Summer Olympics, and at the 2016 Rio de Janeiro Summer Olympics.

== Individual achiviements ==
- Top Goal Keeper:
  - 2015 Pan American Games
  - 2016 Pan American Men's Handball Championship
  - 2019 Pan American Games
