= Alexandro Pozzer =

Brazilian handball player (born 1988)

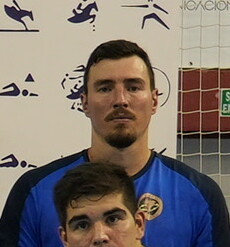

Personal information
- Born: 21 December 1988 (age 37) Caxias do Sul, Brazil
- Height: 1.92 m (6 ft 4 in)

Sport
- Sport: Handball
- Position: Pivot
- Current club: CSM București
- Number: 77
National team
Years	Team	Apps	(Gls)
–	Brazil	108	(161)
Medal record
Pan American Games
Gold medal – first place	2015 Toronto	Team
Bronze medal – third place	2019 Lima	Team
Pan American Championship
Gold medal – first place	2016 Argentina
Silver medal – second place	2018 Greenland
South and Central American Championship
Silver medal – second place	2020 Brazil
South American Games
Gold medal – first place	2018 Cochabamba	Team

Alexandro Pozzer (born 21 December 1988) is a Brazilian handball player for CSM București and the Brazilian national team.

He competed for Brazil at the 2016 Summer Olympics.
