= Handball at the 2015 Pan American Games – Men's tournament =

Handball – Men's tournament at the 2015 Pan American Games
- Venue: Exhibition Centre – Hall B
- Dates: July 17 – July 25
- Competitors: 120 from 8 nations

Medalists
Gold medal	Brazil
Silver medal	Argentina
Bronze medal	Chile

The men's handball tournament at the 2015 Pan American Games in Toronto, Canada, was held at the Exhibition Centre (in Hall B) from July 17 to 25.

For these Games, the men competed in an 8-team tournament. The teams were grouped into two pools of four teams each for a round-robin preliminary round. The top two teams in each group advanced to a single elimination bracket.

Argentina were the defending champions from the 2011 Pan American Games in Guadalajara, defeating Brazil, 26–23 in the final. The two teams faced each other again in the 2015 final, this time with Brazil the victor, 29-27 in extra time.

The tournament determined one direct qualifier for the 2016 Summer Olympics in Rio de Janeiro, Brazil, and one entrant in the Olympic Qualification Tournament. Because the Olympic host nation, Brazil, won, the runner up (Argentina) qualified directly for the Olympics and the third-place team (Chile) earned a spot in the Olympic Qualification Tournament.

== Qualification ==
A total of eight men's teams qualified to compete at the games. The top three teams at the South American and Central American and Caribbean Games qualified, along with the host nation Canada. The United States and Uruguay competed against one another in a home/away playoff for the last spot in the tournament. The fourth placed team in the Central American and Caribbean Games both declined to compete in the respective tournaments.

=== Summary ===
Event	Date	Location	Vacancies	Qualified
Host Nation	—N/a	—N/a	1	Canada
2014 South American Games	March 8–14	(Chile) Santiago	3	Brazil; Argentina; Chile
2014 Central American and Caribbean Games	November 16–24	(Mexico) Veracruz	3	Puerto Rico; Dominican Republic; Cuba
Last chance qualification tournament	March 7/14, 2015	(United States) Auburn (Uruguay) Montevideo	1	Uruguay
Total			8	

=== Last chance qualification tournament ===
March 07	United States	25 – 21	Uruguay	Beard–Eaves–Memorial Coliseum, Auburn; Attendance: 900; Referees: Grillo, Lenci (ARG)
March 07	Hines 7	(10–12)	Morandeira 5	Beard–Eaves–Memorial Coliseum, Auburn; Attendance: 900; Referees: Grillo, Lenci (ARG)
March 07	3× (yellow card) 6× (suspension) 1× (red card)	Report	3× (yellow card) 3× (suspension)	Beard–Eaves–Memorial Coliseum, Auburn; Attendance: 900; Referees: Grillo, Lenci (ARG)

March 14	Uruguay	28 – 20	United States	Polideportivo, Montevideo; Attendance: 1200; Referees: Pinto, Menezes (BRA)
March 14	Velazco, Fabra 5	(14–12)	Inahara 4	Polideportivo, Montevideo; Attendance: 1200; Referees: Pinto, Menezes (BRA)
March 14	1× (yellow card) 3× (suspension)	Report	2× (yellow card) 8× (suspension) 1× (red card)	Polideportivo, Montevideo; Attendance: 1200; Referees: Pinto, Menezes (BRA)

== Rosters ==
At the start of tournament, all eight participating countries had up to 15 players on their rosters.

- Argentina
- Brazil
- Canada
- Chile
- Cuba
- Dominican Republic
- Puerto Rico
- Uruguay

== Draw ==
The draw for the competition took place on March 15, 2015 in Montevideo, Uruguay.

Pot 1	Pot 2	Pot 3	Pot 4
Brazil; Argentina	Chile; Dominican Republic	Canada; Cuba	Puerto Rico; Uruguay

== Results ==
The official detailed schedule was revealed on April 26, 2015.

All times are Eastern Daylight Time (UTC−4)

=== Preliminary round ===
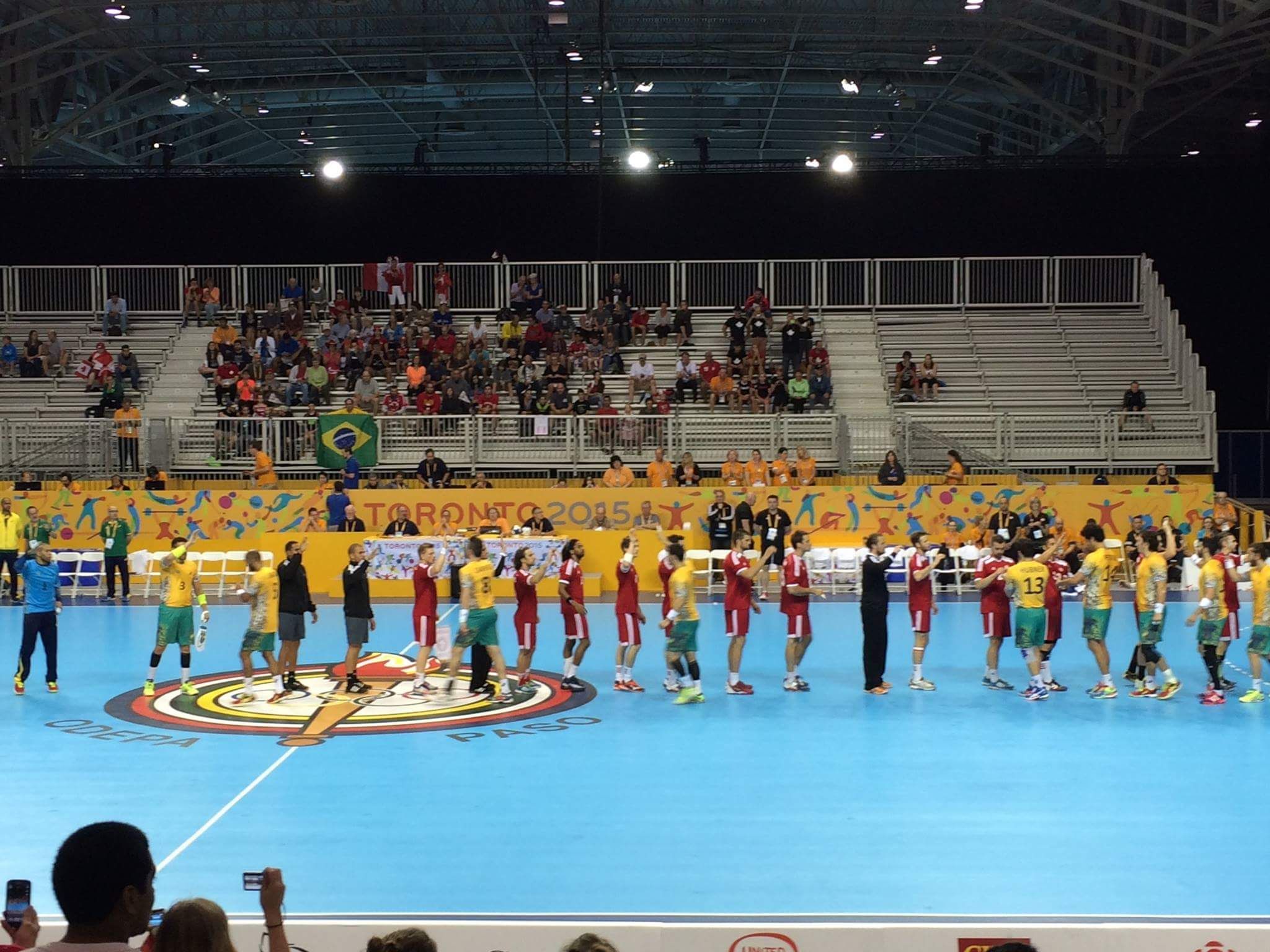
The conclusion of the Canada versus Brazil match

==== Group A ====
Team	Pld	W	D	L	GF	GA	GD	Pts	Qualification
Brazil	3	3	0	0	120	53	+67	6	Qualified for the semifinals
Uruguay	3	2	0	1	77	78	−1	4	Qualified for the semifinals
Canada	3	1	0	2	62	85	−23	2	
Dominican Republic	3	0	0	3	66	109	−43	0	

July 17; 11:30	Brazil	34–17	Canada	Exhibition Centre – Hall B Referees: Ziñiga, Reyes (CUB)
July 17; 11:30	Pacheco 5	(20–8)	Walder 5	Exhibition Centre – Hall B Referees: Ziñiga, Reyes (CUB)
July 17; 11:30	2× (yellow card) 2× (suspension)	report	1× (yellow card) 3× (suspension)	Exhibition Centre – Hall B Referees: Ziñiga, Reyes (CUB)

July 17; 13:30	Dominican Republic	23–33	Uruguay	Exhibition Centre – Hall B Referees: Gjeding, Hansen (DEN)
July 17; 13:30	Mateo 6	(12–13)	Fabra 5	Exhibition Centre – Hall B Referees: Gjeding, Hansen (DEN)
July 17; 13:30	2× (yellow card) 8× (suspension)	report	2× (yellow card) 4× (suspension)	Exhibition Centre – Hall B Referees: Gjeding, Hansen (DEN)

July 19; 11:30	Uruguay	18–38	Brazil	Exhibition Centre – Hall B Referees: Guzman, Perez (PUR)
July 19; 11:30	Morandeira 5	(11–16)	Pozzer, Chiuffa 5	Exhibition Centre – Hall B Referees: Guzman, Perez (PUR)
July 19; 11:30	3× (yellow card) 2× (suspension)	report	2× (yellow card) 2× (suspension)	Exhibition Centre – Hall B Referees: Guzman, Perez (PUR)

July 19; 13:30	Canada	28–25	Dominican Republic	Exhibition Centre – Hall B Referees: Pinto, Menezes (BRA)
July 19; 13:30	Bessette 11	(12–14)	Mateo 9	Exhibition Centre – Hall B Referees: Pinto, Menezes (BRA)
July 19; 13:30	2× (yellow card) 5× (suspension)	report	4× (yellow card) 6× (suspension)	Exhibition Centre – Hall B Referees: Pinto, Menezes (BRA)

July 21; 11:30	Canada	17–26	Uruguay	Exhibition Centre – Hall B Referees: Gjeding, Hansen (DEN)
July 21; 11:30	Sartisson 4	(7–13)	Mendez 7	Exhibition Centre – Hall B Referees: Gjeding, Hansen (DEN)
July 21; 11:30	1× (yellow card) 4× (suspension)	Report	4× (yellow card) 3× (suspension)	Exhibition Centre – Hall B Referees: Gjeding, Hansen (DEN)

July 21; 13:30	Brazil	48–18	Dominican Republic	Exhibition Centre – Hall B Referees: Guzman, Perez (PUR)
July 21; 13:30	Chiuffa 10	(30–7)	Mateo 7	Exhibition Centre – Hall B Referees: Guzman, Perez (PUR)
July 21; 13:30	2× (yellow card) 2× (suspension)	Report	2× (yellow card) 1× (suspension)	Exhibition Centre – Hall B Referees: Guzman, Perez (PUR)

==== Group B ====
Team	Pld	W	D	L	GF	GA	GD	Pts	Qualification
Argentina	3	3	0	0	103	63	+40	6	Qualified for the Semifinals
Chile	3	1	1	1	87	84	+3	3	Qualified for the Semifinals
Cuba	3	1	1	1	87	89	−2	3	
Puerto Rico	3	0	0	3	68	109	−41	0	

July 17; 18:30	Argentina	35–18	Cuba	Exhibition Centre – Hall B Referees: Pinto, Menezes (BRA)
July 17; 18:30	Fernandez, Pizarro 8	(19–10)	Balazquez 7	Exhibition Centre – Hall B Referees: Pinto, Menezes (BRA)
July 17; 18:30	3× (yellow card) 5× (suspension)	report	2× (yellow card) 6× (suspension)	Exhibition Centre – Hall B Referees: Pinto, Menezes (BRA)

July 17; 20:30	Chile	33–23	Puerto Rico	Exhibition Centre – Hall B Referees: Minore, Marina (ARG)
July 17; 20:30	Araya 8	(18–7)	Nazario 9	Exhibition Centre – Hall B Referees: Minore, Marina (ARG)
July 17; 20:30	3× (yellow card) 2× (suspension) 1× (red card)	report	3× (yellow card) 7× (suspension)	Exhibition Centre – Hall B Referees: Minore, Marina (ARG)

July 19; 18:30	Puerto Rico	22–38	Argentina	Exhibition Centre – Hall B Referees: Lemes, Sosa (URU)
July 19; 18:30	Mercado 7	(8–18)	Fernandez 8	Exhibition Centre – Hall B Referees: Lemes, Sosa (URU)
July 19; 18:30	2× (yellow card) 4× (suspension)	report	4× (yellow card) 3× (suspension)	Exhibition Centre – Hall B Referees: Lemes, Sosa (URU)

July 19; 20:30	Cuba	31–31	Chile	Exhibition Centre – Hall B Referees: Gjeding, Hansen (DEN)
July 19; 20:30	Robles 8	(14–13)	R. Salinas 12	Exhibition Centre – Hall B Referees: Gjeding, Hansen (DEN)
July 19; 20:30	2× (yellow card) 7× (suspension)	Report	3× (yellow card) 8× (suspension)	Exhibition Centre – Hall B Referees: Gjeding, Hansen (DEN)

July 21; 18:30	Cuba	38–23	Puerto Rico	Exhibition Centre – Hall B Referees: Lemes, Sosa (URU)
July 21; 18:30	Toledano 13	(22–13)	Hiraldo 7	Exhibition Centre – Hall B Referees: Lemes, Sosa (URU)
July 21; 18:30	1× (yellow card) 6× (suspension)	report	4× (yellow card) 5× (suspension)	Exhibition Centre – Hall B Referees: Lemes, Sosa (URU)

July 21; 20:30	Argentina	30–23	Chile	Exhibition Centre – Hall B Referees: Pinto, Menezes (BRA)
July 21; 20:30	Fernandez, Vieyra 8	(20–12)	Araya 7	Exhibition Centre – Hall B Referees: Pinto, Menezes (BRA)
July 21; 20:30	3× (yellow card) 6× (suspension) 2× (red card)	report	3× (yellow card) 4× (suspension) 1× (red card)	Exhibition Centre – Hall B Referees: Pinto, Menezes (BRA)

=== Classification round ===
Semi-finals
July 23 — Toronto
Canada	24
Puerto Rico	29
July 23 — Toronto
Dominican Republic	24
Cuba	40

Fifth Place
July 25 — Toronto
Puerto Rico	39
Cuba	38
Seventh Place
July 25 — Toronto
Canada	27
Dominican Republic	23

==== Semi-finals ====
July 23; 11:00	Canada	24–29	Puerto Rico	Exhibition Centre – Hall B Referees: Lemes, Sosa (URU)
July 23; 11:00	Walder 7	(10–14)	Hiraldo 15	Exhibition Centre – Hall B Referees: Lemes, Sosa (URU)
July 23; 11:00	3× (yellow card) 3× (suspension)	report	3× (yellow card) 2× (suspension)	Exhibition Centre – Hall B Referees: Lemes, Sosa (URU)

July 23; 18:00	Dominican Republic	24–40	Cuba	Exhibition Centre – Hall B Referees: Minore, Marina (ARG)
July 23; 18:00	Mateo 6	(12–20)	Hernandez 9	Exhibition Centre – Hall B Referees: Minore, Marina (ARG)
July 23; 18:00	3× (yellow card) 6× (suspension)	report	3× (yellow card) 3× (suspension)	Exhibition Centre – Hall B Referees: Minore, Marina (ARG)

==== Seventh place match ====
July 25; 10:30	Canada	27–23	Dominican Republic	Exhibition Centre – Hall B Referees: Guzman, Perez (PUR)
July 25; 10:30	Touzel 6	(16–12)	Mateo 8	Exhibition Centre – Hall B Referees: Guzman, Perez (PUR)
July 25; 10:30	3× (yellow card) 4× (suspension)	report	1× (yellow card) 5× (suspension)	Exhibition Centre – Hall B Referees: Guzman, Perez (PUR)

==== Fifth place match ====
July 25
13:00
Puerto Rico
39–38 (ET)
Cuba
Exhibition Centre – Hall B
Referees: Lemes, Sosa (URU)
Hiraldo 13
(17–15)
Hernandez 15
3× (yellow card) 3× (suspension)
report
3× (yellow card) 4× (suspension) 2× (red card)

FT: 33–33 ET: 6–5

=== Medal round ===
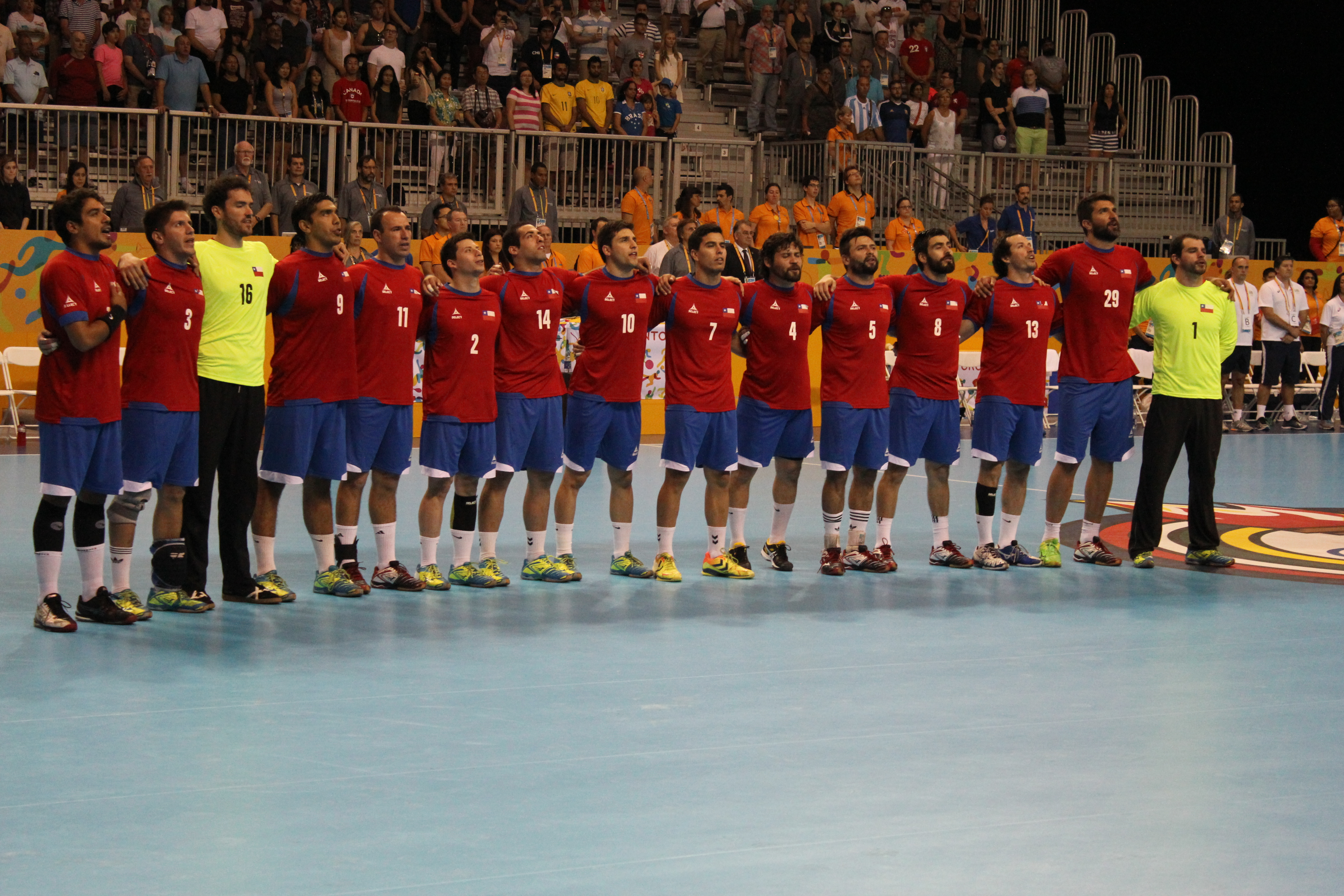
Team Chile

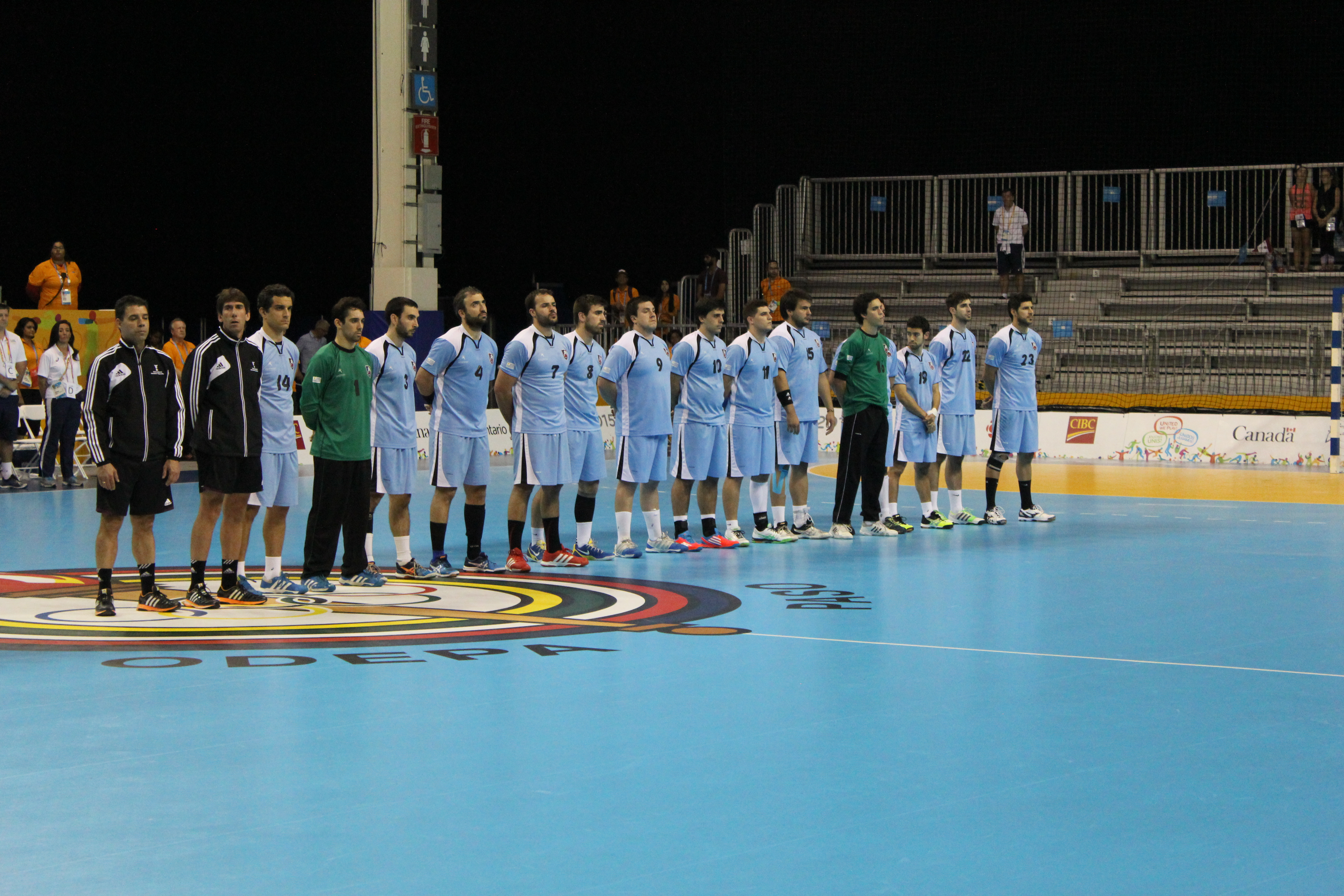
Team Uruguay

Semi-finals
July 23 — Toronto
Brazil	34
Chile	24
July 23 — Toronto
Uruguay	12
Argentina	20

Final
July 25 — Toronto
Brazil	29
Argentina	27
Third Place
July 25 — Toronto
Chile	23
Uruguay	17

==== Semi-finals ====
July 23; 13:30	Brazil	34–24	Chile	Exhibition Centre – Hall B Referees: Gjeding, Hansen (DEN)
July 23; 13:30	Guimarães 5	(15–12)	Salinas 10	Exhibition Centre – Hall B Referees: Gjeding, Hansen (DEN)
July 23; 13:30	2× (yellow card) 5× (suspension)	report	3× (yellow card) 4× (suspension) 1× (red card)	Exhibition Centre – Hall B Referees: Gjeding, Hansen (DEN)

July 23; 20:30	Uruguay	12–20	Argentina	Exhibition Centre – Hall B Referees: Zuñiga, Reyes (CUB)
July 23; 20:30	Gamiz 3	(7–7)	Simonet 10	Exhibition Centre – Hall B Referees: Zuñiga, Reyes (CUB)
July 23; 20:30	2× (yellow card) 6× (suspension)	report	3× (yellow card) 3× (suspension)	Exhibition Centre – Hall B Referees: Zuñiga, Reyes (CUB)

==== Bronze medal match ====
July 25; 17:30	(bronze) Chile	23–17	Uruguay	Exhibition Centre – Hall B Referees: Minore, Marina (ARG)
July 25; 17:30	Salinas 6	(10–9)	Fabra 4	Exhibition Centre – Hall B Referees: Minore, Marina (ARG)
July 25; 17:30	2× (yellow card) 2× (suspension)	report	2× (yellow card) 4× (suspension)	Exhibition Centre – Hall B Referees: Minore, Marina (ARG)

==== Gold medal match ====
July 25
20:00
(gold) Brazil
29–27 (ET)
Argentina (silver)
Exhibition Centre – Hall B
Referees: Gjeding, Hansen (DEN)
Hubner, Santos 6
(9–11)
Fernandez 8
3× (yellow card) 5× (suspension) 1× (red card)
report
2× (yellow card) 2× (suspension)

FT: 24–24 ET: 5–3

== Final ranking ==
Rank	Team
1st place, gold medalist(s)	Brazil
2nd place, silver medalist(s)	Argentina
3rd place, bronze medalist(s)	Chile
4	Uruguay
5	Puerto Rico
6	Cuba
7	Canada
8	Dominican Republic

Qualified for the 2016 Summer Olympics
Qualified for the Olympic Qualification Tournament

2015 Pan American Games winners

Brazil
3rd title

== Statistics ==
=== Top scorers ===
Rank	Player	Goals
1	(Puerto Rico) Hector Hiraldo	44
2	(Cuba) Angel Hernandez	43
3	(Argentina) Federico Fernandez	36
3	(Dominican Republic) Dioris Mateo	36
5	(Puerto Rico) Jorge Nazario	28

=== Top goalkeepers ===
Rank	Player	Saves	%
1	(Argentina) Matías Schulz	61	48
2	(Brazil) Maik Santos	49	44
3	(Uruguay) Manuel Adler	63	40
