= List of Pan American Games medalists in handball (men) =

These are the Pan American Games medalists in men's handball.

Games	Gold	Silver	Bronze
1987 Indianapolis	United States Marc Stanton; Joe McVein; Pete Lash Jr. Tom Schneeberger; Bob Djokovich; Joe Story; Rod Oshita; Scott Driggers; Rick Oleksyk; Boyd Janny; Steve Goss; Bill Kessler; Michael Sullivan; Greg Morava; Jim Buehning	Cuba Juan Querol; Jesús Agramonte; Marcos Aguirre; Pablo Figueredo; Andrés Hurtado; Modesto Quintana; Luis Delisle; Arsenio Martínez; Antonio Puentes; Emilio Sánchez; Osvaldo Povea; Luis A Martínez; Daniel Robert Suárez; José Nenínger; Julián Duranona	Brazil SB; Everaldo Lopes; Drean Dutra; Xexa; Jabá; Edson Rizzo; Paulo Bittar; José Luiz Vieira; Vinícius Teti; José Luiz Aguiar e Ramalho; Sérgio Hornelan; Luiz Sampaio; Gilberto Cardoso
1991 Havana	Cuba Andres Hurtado; Jose Rodney; Pablo Figueredo; Luis Martinez; Freddy Suarez; Rolando Urio; Ivo Aldazabal; Osvaldo Povea; Juan Cruz; Luis Delisle; Daniel Robert; Arsenio Martinez; Julian Duranona; Carlos Reinaldo; Aldo Karell; Vladimir Riveiro	Brazil Valmir Fassina; Almir Albuquerque; Ivan Pinheiro; Antonio Goncalves; Jose Nascimento; Fausto Steinwandter; Jose Lopez; Sergio Horberlan; Gilberto Cardoso; Claudio Oliveira; Paulo Martins; Oswaldo Inocente; Ivan Masiero	United States Matt Van Houten; Mike Hurdle; Tom Fitzgerald; Hermann Eastmond; Terje Vatne; Craig Fitschen; Matthew Ryan; Eric Lathrop; John Keller; Darrick Heath; Steve Peck; Bryant Johnson; Kevon With Row; Rick Oleksyk; William Kessler; Mules McPartland
1995 Mar del Plata	Cuba Alberto Chambert; José Rodney; Julio Fis; Luis A Martínez; Luis Silveira; Rolando Uríos; Ivo Díaz; Osvaldo Povea; Freddy Suárez; Daniel Robert Suárez; Iran Danger; Félix Romero; Carlos Pérez; Vladimir Rivero; José C Martínez	Brazil Petrolina; Fausto Steinwandter; Marquinhos; SB; Mineiro; Daniel Pinheiro; Gilberto Cardoso; Miltinho; Cláudio Brito; Agberto; Xexa; Macarrão; China; Jabá	Argentina Walter Arzola; Gabriel Canzoniero; Marcelo Schmidt; Daniel Salazar; Jaime Persyck; Pablo Sznitowski; Roberto Morlacchi; Sebastián Miri; Pablo González; Martín Viscovich; Gustavo Fernández; Andrés Kogovsek; Leandro Sebele; Juan Martín Rinaldi; Marcelo Taverna; Cláudio Strafe
1999 Winnipeg	Cuba Misael Iglesias; Vladimir Rivero; Carlos Pérez; Félix Romero; José Rodney; Juan González; Odael Marcos; Rolando Uríos; Amauris Cárdenas; Freddy Suárez; Ivo Díaz; Julio Fis; Luis Yant	Brazil Alexandre Folhas; Alê Vasconcelos; Bruno Souza; Carlos Silva; Menta; Guga; Helinho; Petrolina; Léo; Fábio Vanini; Lúcio Martins; Marcão; Miltinho	Argentina Cristian Canzoniero; Gabriel Canzoniero; Pablo Buceta; Juan Lucas Cruz; Pablo González; Eric Gull; Cristian Hanjsek; Rodolfo Jung; Andrés Kogovsek; Roberto Morlacchi; Christian Platti; Gonzalo Viscovich; Martín Viscovich
2003 Santo Domingo	Brazil Alexandre Folhas; Alê Vasconcelos; Bruno Souza; Baldacin; Mineiro; Fábio Vanini; Guga; Helinho; Jardel; Jair; Jaqson; SB; Marcão; Tupan; China	Argentina Juan Lucas Cruz; Andrés Kogovsek; Eric Gull; Alejo Carrara; Cristian Canzoniero; Martín Viscovich; Alejandro Mariné; Gonzalo Viscovich; Federico Besasso; Bruno Civelli; Gonzalo Carou; Rodolfo Jung; Sergio Crevatín; Fernando García; Mariano Larre; Christian Platti	United States Daniel Hennessy; Mohamed El-Gammal; Tom Fitzgerald; Joe Fitzgerald; Joe Lamour; Kevin Williams; Jon Sampson; Timothy Lawrence; Gary Hines; Divine Jackson; Lee van Houten; Bobby Dunn; Mike Thornberry; Italo Zanzi; John Kelly; David Thompson
2007 Rio de Janeiro	Brazil	Argentina	Cuba
2011 Guadalajara	Argentina	Brazil	Chile
2015 Toronto	Brazil	Argentina	Chile
2019 Lima	Argentina	Chile	Brazil
2023 Santiago	Argentina	Brazil	Chile
