= Handball at the 2004 Summer Olympics – Men's team rosters =

These squads consisted of a maximum of 15 players.

== Teams ==
=== Brazil ===
The following is the Brazil roster in the men's handball tournament of the 2004 Summer Olympics.

Head coach: Valmir Fassina

No.	Pos.	Name	Date of birth (age)	Height	App.	Goals	Club
2	LB	Jaqson Kojoroski	3 January 1979 (aged 25)	1.91 m			(Brazil) IMES
4	RW	Adalberto Silva	12 May 1979 (aged 25)	1.89 m			(Brazil) Metodista
5	RB	José Nascimento	16 March 1966 (aged 38)	1.84 m			(Brazil) Metodista
6	LW	Jair Henrique Alves Junior	1 October 1978 (aged 25)	1.83 m			(Brazil) Unifil Londrina
7	RW	Renato Tupan Ruy	7 June 1979 (aged 25)	1.86 m			(Germany) HSC Landwehrhagen
8	LB	Bruno Souza	27 June 1977 (aged 27)	1.91 m			(Germany) FA Göppingen
9	LB	Agberto Matos	8 April 1972 (aged 32)	1.93 m			(Brazil) Metodista
10	RW	Hélio Justino	23 July 1972 (aged 32)	1.84 m			(Brazil) Metodista
11	P	Daniel Baldacin	6 May 1977 (aged 27)	1.90 m			(Brazil) Metodista
12	GK	Alexandre Vasconcelos	19 December 1978 (aged 25)	1.94 m			(Brazil) IMES
14	CB	Ivan Bruno Maziero	1 June 1969 (aged 35)	1.81 m			(Brazil) Metodista
15	RB	Eduardo Henrique Reis	7 March 1970 (aged 34)	1.90 m			(Brazil) IMES
16	GK	Marcos Paulo Santos	26 May 1976 (aged 28)	1.84 m			(Brazil) Metodista
18	CB	Bruno Santana	27 February 1982 (aged 22)	1.83 m			(Brazil) EC Pinheiros
20	CB	Gustavo Henrique Silva	28 April 1979 (aged 25)	1.90 m			(Brazil) EC Pinheiros

=== Croatia ===
The following is the Croatia roster in the men's handball tournament of the 2004 Summer Olympics.

Head coaches: Lino Červar

No.	Pos.	Name	Date of birth (age)	Height	App.	Goals	Club
1	GK	Venio Losert	25 July 1976 (aged 28)	1.91 m			(Spain) BM Granollers
2	LW	Nikša Kaleb	9 March 1973 (aged 31)	1.84 m			(Croatia) RK Zagreb
4	CB	Ivano Balić	1 April 1979 (aged 25)	1.89 m			(Spain) Portland San Antonio
6	LB	Blaženko Lacković	25 December 1980 (aged 23)	1.95 m			(Germany) SG Flensburg
7	RW	Vedran Zrnić	26 September 1979 (aged 24)	1.88 m			(Slovenia) RK Gorenje Velenje
9	P	Igor Vori	20 September 1980 (aged 23)	2.02 m			(Croatia) RK Zagreb
10	LB	Davor Dominiković	7 April 1978 (aged 26)	2.03 m			(Germany) Kronau Ostringen
11	RW	Mirza Džomba	28 February 1977 (aged 27)	1.90 m			(Spain) BM Ciudad Real
12	GK	Vlado Šola	17 November 1968 (aged 35)	1.94 m			(Hungary) Fotex Veszprem
14	RB	Drago Vuković	3 August 1983 (aged 21)	1.94 m			(Croatia) RK Zagreb
15	CB	Slavko Goluža	17 September 1971 (aged 32)	1.95 m			(Hungary) Fotex Veszprem
16	GK	Valter Matošević	11 June 1970 (aged 34)	1.93 m			(Germany) Wilhelmshavener HV
17	LW	Goran Šprem	6 July 1979 (aged 25)	1.83 m			(Croatia) RK Zagreb
18	CB	Denis Špoljarić	20 August 1979 (aged 24)	1.94 m			(Croatia) RK Zagreb
19	RB	Petar Metličić	25 December 1976 (aged 27)	1.94 m			(Spain) CB Ademar León

=== Egypt ===
The following is the Egypt roster in the men's handball tournament of the 2004 Summer Olympics.

Head coaches: Jorn-Uwe Lommel

No.	Pos.	Name	Date of birth (age)	Height	App.	Goals	Club
1	GK	Mohamad Sharaf Eldin	23 December 1974 (aged 29)	1.86 m			(Egypt) Zamalek SC
2	LB	Abdalla Mohamed	26 August 1978 (aged 25)	1.92 m			(Egypt) Zamalek SC
6	RW	Ahmed El Ahmar	27 January 1984 (aged 20)	1.85 m			(Egypt) Zamalek SC
7	RB	Saber Hussein	20 February 1974 (aged 30)	1.94 m			(Egypt) Al Ahly SC
8	P	Wael Fahim	1 January 1976 (aged 28)	1.80 m			(Egypt) Zamalek SC
10	RW	Sherif Moemen	29 April 1974 (aged 30)	1.85 m			(Egypt) Aviation SC
11	LW	Ramy Youssef	13 March 1980 (aged 24)	1.80 m			(Egypt) Zamalek SC
12	GK	Mohamed Nakib	6 April 1974 (aged 30)	1.92 m			(Egypt) El-Olympi
13	RB	Mahmoud Karam	17 November 1982 (aged 21)	1.95 m			(Egypt) Al Ahly SC
14	P	Marwan Ragab	3 August 1974 (aged 30)	1.92 m			(Egypt) Sporting Alexandria
15	LB	Mohamed Abdel Salam	12 January 1982 (aged 22)	1.90 m			(Egypt) Zamalek SC
17	LW	Mohamed Keshk	18 April 1980 (aged 24)	1.88 m			(Egypt) Aviation SC
18	CB	Hany El-Fakharany	6 April 1978 (aged 26)	1.96 m			(Egypt) Al Ahly SC
19	CB	Hassan Yosry	17 July 1978 (aged 25)	1.80 m			(Egypt) Zamalek SC
20	LB	Hussein Zaky	1 March 1979 (aged 25)	1.90 m			(Spain) BM Ciudad Real

=== France ===
The following is the France roster in the men's handball tournament of the 2004 Summer Olympics.

Head coach: Claude Onesta

No.	Pos.	Name	Date of birth (age)	Height	App.	Goals	Club
1	GK	Yohann Ploquin	31 May 1978 (aged 26)	1.90 m	36	/	(France) Toulouse Handball
2	LB	Jérôme Fernandez	7 March 1977 (aged 27)	1.99 m	161	666	(Spain) FC Barcelona
3	P/DEF	Didier Dinart	18 January 1977 (aged 27)	1.97 m	182	85	(Spain) BM Ciudad Real
4	RB	Cédric Burdet	15 November 1974 (aged 29)	1.95 m	153	366	(Germany) VfL Gummersbach
5	CB	Guillaume Gille	12 July 1976 (aged 28)	1.92 m	151	449	(Germany) HSV Hamburg
6	P	Bertrand Gille	24 March 1978 (aged 26)	1.87 m	142	427	(Germany) HSV Hamburg
7	P	Guéric Kervadec	9 January 1972 (aged 32)	1.98 m	191	476	(France) US Creteil
8	LB	Daniel Narcisse	16 December 1979 (aged 24)	1.89 m	74	200	(France) Chambéry Savoie HB
9	RW	Grégory Anquetil	14 December 1970 (aged 33)	1.78 m	144	377	(France) Montpellier HB
11	LW	Olivier Girault	22 February 1973 (aged 31)	1.83 m	146	285	(France) Paris Handball
13	LB	Nikola Karabatić	11 April 1984 (aged 20)	1.95 m	29	130	(France) Montpellier HB
16	GK	Thierry Omeyer	2 November 1976 (aged 27)	1.92 m	91	/	(France) Montpellier HB
17	CB	Jackson Richardson	16 June 1969 (aged 35)	1.86 m	389	752	(Spain) Portland San Antonio
18	RW	Joël Abati	25 April 1971 (aged 33)	1.90 m	107	276	(Germany) SC Magdeburg
21	LW	Michaël Guigou	28 January 1982 (aged 22)	1.79 m	16	42	(France) Montpellier HB

=== Germany ===
The following is the Germany roster in the men's handball tournament of the 2004 Summer Olympics.

Head coaches: Heiner Brand

No.	Pos.	Name	Date of birth (age)	Height	App.	Goals	Club
1	GK	Henning Fritz	21 September 1974 (aged 29)	1.89 m			(Germany) THW Kiel
2	LB	Pascal Hens	26 March 1980 (aged 24)	2.03 m			(Germany) HSV Hamburg
4	P	Mark Dragunski	22 December 1970 (aged 33)	2.14 m			(Germany) VfL Gummersbach
5	LW	Stefan Kretzschmar	17 February 1973 (aged 31)	1.96 m			(Germany) SC Magdeburg
7	LB	Jan Olaf Immel	14 March 1976 (aged 28)	2.02 m			(Germany) SG Wallau-Massenheim
8	P	Christian Schwarzer	23 October 1969 (aged 34)	1.96 m			(Germany) TBV Lemgo
9	P	Klaus-Dieter Petersen	6 November 1968 (aged 35)	1.98 m			(Germany) THW Kiel
10	LB	Frank von Behren	28 September 1976 (aged 27)	1.98 m			(Germany) VfL Gummersbach
11	RB	Volker Zerbe	30 June 1968 (aged 36)	2.11 m			(Germany) TBV Lemgo
12	GK	Christian Ramota	14 April 1973 (aged 31)	2.00 m			(Germany) TBV Lemgo
13	CB	Markus Baur	22 January 1971 (aged 33)	1.90 m			(Germany) TBV Lemgo
14	RB	Christian Zeitz	18 November 1980 (aged 23)	1.86 m			(Germany) THW Kiel
15	LW	Torsten Jansen	23 December 1976 (aged 27)	1.85 m			(Germany) HSV Hamburg
18	LB	Daniel Stephan	3 August 1973 (aged 31)	1.98 m			(Germany) TBV Lemgo
19	RW	Florian Kehrmann	26 June 1977 (aged 27)	1.85 m			(Germany) TBV Lemgo

=== Greece ===
The following is the Greece roster in the men's handball tournament of the 2004 Summer Olympics.

Head coaches: Ulf Hakan Schefvert

No.	Pos.	Name	Date of birth (age)	Height	App.	Goals	Club
2	LW	Vangelis-Giorgos Voglis	17 December 1977 (aged 26)	1.80 m			(Sweden) Djurgårdens IF
4	RW	Dimitrios Tzimourtos	10 February 1981 (aged 23)	1.72 m			(Greece) Filippos AC Veria
6	RB	Alexandros Vasilakis	8 August 1979 (aged 25)	1.98 m			(Germany) Wilhelmshavener HV
7	LW	Giorgos Zaravinas	13 June 1976 (aged 28)	1.82 m			(Greece) Panellinios
8	LW	Gregor Chatsatourian	19 April 1977 (aged 27)	1.75 m			(Greece) AC Doukas
9	LB	Spyros Balomenos	28 February 1979 (aged 25)	1.95 m			(Sweden) IF Guif Stockholm
10	P	Nikolaos Kokolodimitrakis	7 April 1981 (aged 23)	2.00 m			(Greece) Ionikos
11	CB	Nikolaos Grammatikos	13 October 1969 (aged 34)	1.90 m			(Greece) Panellinios
12	GK	Dimitrios Kafatos	20 March 1976 (aged 28)	1.94 m			(Greece) Ionikos
13	CB	Sasa Zivoulovic	14 April 1972 (aged 32)	1.87 m			(Greece) AC Doukas
14	LB	Andreas Troupis	5 April 1973 (aged 31)	1.95 m			(Greece) Panellinios
16	GK	Jiotsa Chrysopoulos	29 July 1969 (aged 35)	1.91 m			(Spain) Barakaldo UPV Bilbao
17	P	Giorgos Chalkidis	13 May 1977 (aged 27)	1.96 m			(Greece) Panellinios
19	RB	Alexis Alvanos	9 April 1980 (aged 24)	1.97 m			(Greece) Panellinios
20	RW	Savvas Karypidis	23 May 1979 (aged 25)	1.83 m			(Greece) Filippos AC Veria

=== Hungary ===
The following is the Hungary roster in the men's handball tournament of the 2004 Summer Olympics.

Head coaches: László Skaliczky

No.	Pos.	Name	Date of birth (age)	Height	App.	Goals	Club
1	GK	János Szathmári	25 March 1969 (aged 35)	1.85 m			(Hungary) Tatabánya-Carbonex KC
2	RW	Gergely Harsányi	3 May 1981 (aged 23)	1.91 m			(Hungary) PLER KC
3	LB	Ferenc Ilyés	20 December 1981 (aged 22)	1.98 m			(Hungary) SC Pick Szeged
4	CB	Gábor Császár	16 June 1984 (aged 20)	1.87 m			(Hungary) Dunaferr SE
5	P	Richárd Mezei	23 October 1970 (aged 33)	1.98 m			(Hungary) SC Pick Szeged
6	RB	Tamás Mocsai	9 December 1978 (aged 25)	1.96 m			(Switzerland) Pfadi Winterthur
7	P	Gyula Gál	18 August 1976 (aged 27)	1.93 m			(Hungary) Fotex KC Veszprém
8	LW	Gergő Iváncsik	30 November 1981 (aged 22)	1.90 m			(Hungary) Fotex KC Veszprém
12	GK	Nándor Fazekas	16 October 1976 (aged 27)	1.92 m			(Germany) TuS N-Lübbecke
13	CB	Ivo Díaz	10 May 1972 (aged 32)	1.90 m			(Hungary) Fotex KC Veszprém
14	LB	Carlos Pérez	26 August 1971 (aged 32)	1.97 m			(Hungary) Fotex KC Veszprém
15	LW	István Pásztor	5 June 1971 (aged 33)	1.92 m			(Hungary) Fotex KC Veszprém
17	RB	Balázs Laluska	20 June 1981 (aged 23)	2.02 m			(Hungary) SC Pick Szeged
19	RB	László Nagy	3 March 1981 (aged 23)	2.08 m			(Spain) FC Barcelona
24	CB	Péter Lendvay	15 September 1976 (aged 27)	1.92 m			(Spain) SD Octavio Vigo

=== Iceland ===
The following is the Iceland roster in the men's handball tournament of the 2004 Summer Olympics.

Head coaches: Gudmundur Gudmundsson

No.	Pos.	Name	Date of birth (age)	Height	App.	Goals	Club
1	GK	Roland Eradze	7 May 1971 (aged 33)	1.90 m			(Iceland) Valur
2	P	Róbert Sighvatsson	13 November 1972 (aged 31)	1.91 m			(Germany) HSG Wetzlar
3	CB	Kristján Andrésson	27 March 1981 (aged 23)	1.82 m			(Sweden) Eskilstuna Guif
4	CB	Einar Örn Jónsson	28 December 1976 (aged 27)	1.83 m			(Germany) SG Wallau-Massenheim
5	P	Sigfús Sigurðsson	7 May 1975 (aged 29)	1.98 m			(Germany) SC Magdeburg
6	LB	Dagur Sigurðsson	3 April 1973 (aged 31)	1.93 m			(Austria) A1 Bregenz
8	RW	Gylfi Gylfason	22 September 1977 (aged 26)	1.77 m			(Germany) Wilhelmshavener HV
9	LW	Guðjón Valur Sigurðsson	8 August 1979 (aged 25)	1.88 m			(Germany) TUSEM Essen
10	CB	Snorri Steinn Guðjónsson	17 October 1981 (aged 22)	1.92 m			(Germany) TV Grosswallstadt
11	RB	Ólafur Stefánsson	3 July 1973 (aged 31)	1.96 m			(Spain) BM Ciudad Real
12	GK	Guðmundur Hrafnkelsson	22 January 1965 (aged 39)	1.90 m			(Germany) SG Kronau/Östringen
13	LB	Rúnar Sigtryggsson	7 April 1972 (aged 32)	1.94 m			(Germany) ThSV Eisenach
15	RB	Ásgeir Örn Hallgrímsson	17 February 1984 (aged 20)	1.90 m			(Iceland) Haukar
17	LB	Jalesky Garcia Padron	28 January 1975 (aged 29)	1.94 m			(Germany) FA Göppingen
18	P	Róbert Gunnarsson	22 May 1980 (aged 24)	1.92 m			(Denmark) Aarhus GF

=== South Korea ===
The following is the South Korea roster in the men's handball tournament of the 2004 Summer Olympics.

Head coaches: Kim Tae-hoon

No.	Pos.	Name	Date of birth (age)	Height	App.	Goals	Club
1	GK	Han Kyung-tai	11 April 1975 (aged 29)	1.91 m			(Switzerland) BSV Bern
5	LW	Kim Tea-wan	15 February 1980 (aged 24)	1.83 m			(South Korea) Chungcheong HB
6	RW	Kim Sung-heon	2 September 1974 (aged 29)	1.89 m			(Japan) Daido Steel
7	LB	Yoon Kyung-min	31 October 1979 (aged 24)	1.93 m			(South Korea) Chungcheong HB
8	LB	Lim Duk-jun	30 August 1980 (aged 23)	1.86 m			(South Korea) Doosan Handball Club
9	RB	Choi Seung-wook	13 March 1982 (aged 22)	1.82 m			(South Korea) Doosan Handball Club
10	P	Park Chan-yong	1 January 1980 (aged 24)	1.89 m			(South Korea) HC Korosa
11	LB	Oh Yun-suk	1 March 1984 (aged 20)	1.96 m			(South Korea) Sungkyunkwan University
12	GK	Lee Chang-woo	12 May 1983 (aged 21)	1.87 m			(South Korea) Kyung Hee University
13	RB	Yoon Kyung-shin	7 July 1973 (aged 31)	2.03 m			(Germany) VfL Gummersbach
14	P	Park Min-chul	23 December 1974 (aged 29)	1.91 m			(South Korea) Chungcheong HB
15	LW	Lee Tea-young	25 November 1977 (aged 26)	1.74 m			(South Korea) HC Korosa
17	CB	Lee Jae-woo	28 September 1979 (aged 24)	1.82 m			(South Korea) HC Korosa
19	RW	Ji Seung-hyun	7 January 1979 (aged 25)	1.79 m			(South Korea) Doosan Handball Club
20	CB	Paek Won-chul	10 January 1977 (aged 27)	1.80 m			(Japan) Daido Steel

=== Russia ===
The following is the Russia roster in the men's handball tournament of the 2004 Summer Olympics.

Head coaches: Vladimir Maksimov

No.	Pos.	Name	Date of birth (age)	Height	App.	Goals	Club
1	GK	Andrey Lavrov	26 March 1962 (aged 42)	1.97 m			(Germany) SG Kronau/Östringen
3	CB	Vitali Ivanov	3 February 1976 (aged 28)	1.94 m			(Russia) Chekhovskiye Medvedi
5	CB	Oleg Kuleshov	15 April 1974 (aged 30)	1.84 m			(Germany) SC Magdeburg
6	RW	Denis Krivoshlykov	10 May 1971 (aged 33)	1.82 m			(Spain) CB Ademar León
8	RB	Alexandre Tuchkin	15 July 1964 (aged 40)	2.03 m			(Greece) Filippos Veria H.C.
9	LW	Vasily Kudinov	17 February 1969 (aged 35)	1.95 m			(Russia) Lukoil Dinamo Astrakhan
10	RW	Pavel Bashkin	1 September 1978 (aged 25)	1.87 m			(Russia) Lukoil Dinamo Astrakhan
11	P	Dmitri Torgovanov	5 January 1972 (aged 32)	2.00 m			(Germany) TUSEM Essen
13	CB	Alexander Gorbatikov	4 June 1982 (aged 22)	1.88 m			(Russia) Lukoil Dinamo Astrakhan
15	LB	Alexey Rastvortsev	8 August 1978 (aged 26)	2.00 m			(Russia) Chekhovskiye Medvedi
16	GK	Alexey Kostygov	5 July 1973 (aged 31)	1.92 m			(Russia) Chekhovskiye Medvedi
18	RB	Vyacheslav Gorpishin	20 January 1970 (aged 34)	2.00 m			(Germany) TSG Friesenheim
19	RB	Sergey Pogorelov	2 June 1974 (aged 30)	2.00 m			(Spain) BM Ciudad Real
20	P	Mikhail Chipurin	17 November 1980 (aged 23)	1.90 m			(Russia) Chekhovskiye Medvedi
23	LW	Eduard Kokcharov	4 November 1975 (aged 28)	1.85 m			(Slovenia) RK Celje

=== Slovenia ===
The following is the Slovenia roster in the men's handball tournament of the 2004 Summer Olympics.

Head coaches: Tone Tiselj

No.	Pos.	Name	Date of birth (age)	Height	App.	Goals	Club
1	GK	Dušan Podpečan	12 October 1975 (aged 28)	1.96 m			(Slovenia) RK Gorenje
2	LB	Miladin Kozlina	11 February 1983 (aged 21)	1.97 m			(Slovenia) RK Celje
4	RB	Renato Vugrinec	9 June 1975 (aged 29)	1.95 m			(Slovenia) RK Celje
5	LW	Zoran Jovičič	4 November 1976 (aged 27)	1.84 m			(Slovenia) RK Prevent
6	LW	Andrej Kastelic	6 April 1971 (aged 33)	1.85 m			(Slovenia) RD Prule 67
7	LW	Vid Kavtičnik	24 May 1984 (aged 20)	1.91 m			(Slovenia) RK Gorenje
8	P	Marko Oštir	7 June 1977 (aged 27)	1.94 m			(Slovenia) RK Gorenje
9	RB	Jure Natek	30 March 1982 (aged 22)	1.93 m			(Slovenia) RK Celje
13	P	Tomaž Tomšič	17 August 1972 (aged 31)	1.91 m			(France) US Ivry Handball
14	LB	Siarhei Rutenka	29 August 1981 (aged 22)	1.98 m			(Slovenia) RK Celje
15	LB	Aleš Pajovič	6 January 1979 (aged 25)	1.97 m			(Spain) BM Ciudad Real
16	GK	Beno Lapajne	10 June 1973 (aged 31)	2.00 m			(Slovenia) RK Gold Club
17	RW	Matjaž Brumen	23 December 1982 (aged 21)	1.90 m			(Slovenia) RK Celje
18	CB	Uroš Zorman	9 January 1980 (aged 24)	1.89 m			(Slovenia) RK Celje
20	RW	Luka Žvižej	9 December 1980 (aged 23)	1.84 m			(Spain) FC Barcelona

=== Spain ===
The following is the Spain roster in the men's handball tournament of the 2004 Summer Olympics.

Head coaches: Cesar Argiles

No.	Pos.	Name	Date of birth (age)	Height	App.	Goals	Club
1	GK	José Javier Hombrados	7 April 1972 (aged 32)	1.97 m			(Spain) BM Ciudad Real
2	LB	Alberto Entrerríos	7 November 1976 (aged 27)	1.92 m			(Spain) BM Ciudad Real
6	LW	Xavier O'Callaghan	2 March 1972 (aged 32)	1.86 m			(Spain) FC Barcelona Handbol
8	RB	Jon Belaustegui	19 March 1979 (aged 25)	1.95 m			(Germany) HSV Hamburg
9	RB	Mateo Garralda	1 December 1969 (aged 34)	1.96 m			(Spain) Portland San Antonio
10	CB	Talant Duyshebaev	6 February 1968 (aged 36)	1.83 m			(Spain) BM Ciudad Real
11	CB	Demetrio Lozano	26 September 1975 (aged 28)	1.96 m			(Germany) THW Kiel
13	RW	Fernando Hernández	24 February 1973 (aged 31)	1.85 m			(Spain) FC Barcelona Handbol
14	P	Juan Pérez	3 January 1974 (aged 30)	2.02 m			(Spain) Portland San Antonio
15	P	Manuel Colón	18 February 1977 (aged 27)	1.95 m			(Spain) Ademar Leon
16	GK	David Barrufet	4 June 1970 (aged 34)	1.97 m			(Spain) FC Barcelona Handbol
17	LW	Juanín García	28 August 1977 (aged 26)	1.76 m			(Spain) Ademar Leon
18	LB	Iker Romero	15 June 1980 (aged 24)	1.96 m			(Spain) FC Barcelona Handbol
19	P	Rolando Urios	27 January 1971 (aged 33)	1.93 m			(Spain) BM Ciudad Real
20	RW	Antonio Carlos Ortega	14 July 1971 (aged 33)	1.84 m			(Spain) FC Barcelona
