= List of Pan American Games venues in handball =

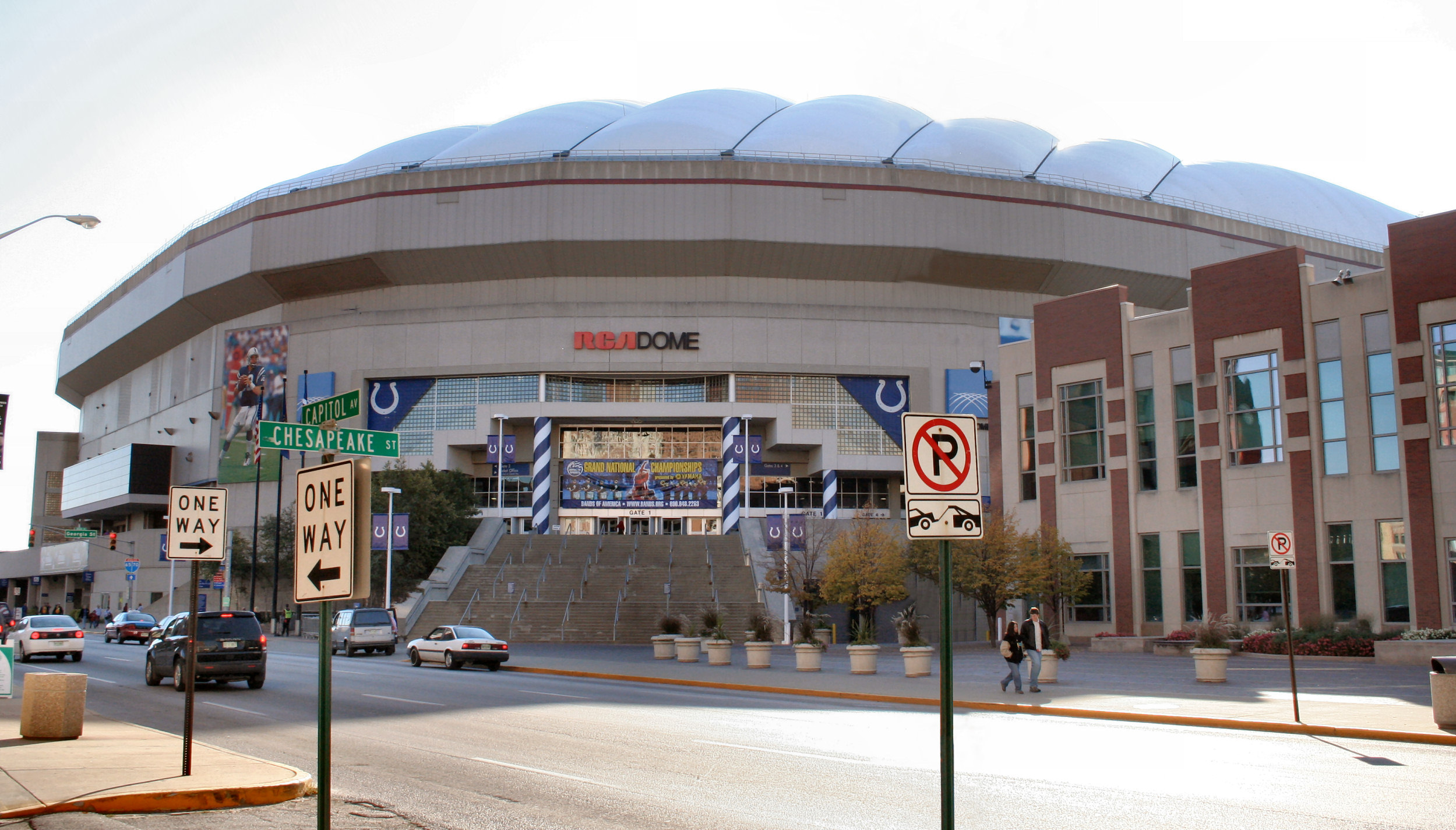
Hoosier Dome hosted the handball final for the 1987 Pan American Games in Indianapolis.

For the Pan American Games, there are 10 venues that have been or will be used for handball.

Games	Venue	Other sports hosted at venue for those games	Capacity	Ref.
1987 Indianapolis	Hoosier Dome	Ceremonies (closing), Gymnastics	up to 60,000	
1991 Havana			Not listed	
1995 Mar del Plata			Not listed	
1999 Winnipeg	Winnipeg Convention Centre	Judo, Taekwondo	Not listed	
2003 Santo Domingo	Handball Hall	None	2,000	
2007 Rio de Janeiro	Riocentro Complex (IBC/MPC) 3B	Futsal	2,745	
2011 Guadalajara	San Rafael Gymnasium	None	2,822	
2015 Toronto	Exhibition Centre	Volleyball, Roller sports (artistic), Racquetball, Squash	2,000	
2019 Lima	Polideportivo 1	Judo	2,300	
2023 Santiago	Viña del Mar City Gym	None	3,371	
