= Handball at the 1991 Pan American Games =

The Men's Handball Tournament at the 1991 Pan American Games was held from August 5 to August 12, 1991 in Havana, Cuba. Due the lack of teams, the women did not compete at this edition.

== Men's tournament ==
=== Final ranking ===
RANK	TEAM
1.	Cuba (Note: Cuba qualified for the 1992 Summer Olympics in Barcelona, Spain, but was replaced by Brazil)
2.	Brazil
3.	United States
4.	Canada
5.	Argentina

=== Medalists ===
Event	Gold	Silver	Bronze
Men's tournament	Cuba Andres Hurtado; Jose Rodney; Pablo Figueredo; Luis Martinez; Freddy Suarez; Rolando Urio; Ivo Aldazabal; Osvaldo Povea; Juan Cruz; Luis Delisle; Daniel Robert; Arsenio Martinez; Julian Duranona; Carlos Reinaldo; Aldo Karell; Vladimir Riveiro	Brazil Valmir Fassina; Almir Albuquerque; Ivan Pinheiro; Antonio Goncalves; Jose Nascimento; Fausto Steinwandter; Jose Lopez; Sergio Horberlan; Gilberto Cardoso; Claudio Oliveira; Paulo Martins; Oswaldo Inocente; Ivan Masiero	United States Matt Van Houten; Mike Hurdle; Tom Fitzgerald; Hermann Eastmond; Terje Vatne; Craig Fitschen; Matthew Ryan; Eric Lathrop; John Keller; Darrick Heath; Steve Peck; Bryant Johnson; Kevon With Row; Rick Oleksyk; William Kessler; Muales McPartland

=== Awards ===
1991 Pan American Games winners

Cuba
First title

== See also ==
- List of Pan American Games medalists in handball (men)
