= Rolando Uríos =

Spanish handball player (born 1971)

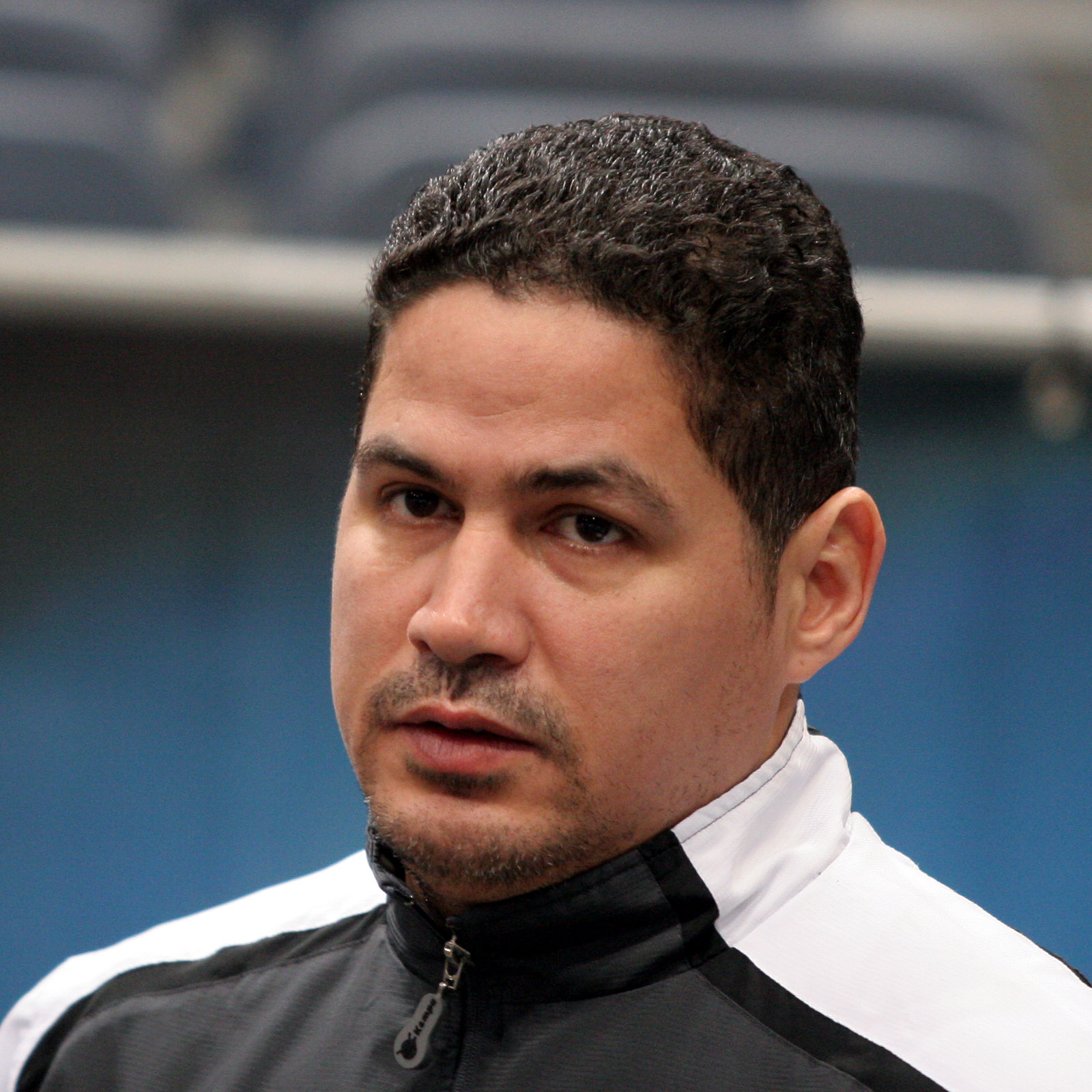
- Rolando Urios in 2008

Personal information
- Full name: Rolando Uríos Fonseca
- Nationality: Cuban, Spanish
- Born: 27 January 1971 (age 55) Bayamo, Cuba
- Height: 1.93 m (6 ft 4 in)

Sport
- Sport: Handball
- Position: Pivot

Senior clubs
- Years: Team
- 1984-1997: ESPA Havanna
- 1997-1998: KC Fotex Veszprém
- 1998–2001: US Ivry HB
- 2001-2009: BM Ciudad Real
- 2022: BM Alarcos de Ciudad Real
National team
Years	Team	Apps	
1991-2000	Cuba	79	
2004-2007	Spain	53	(182)
Medal record
Representing Spain
World Championship
Gold medal – first place	2005 Tunisia
European Championship
Silver medal – second place	2006 Switzerland
Representing Cuba
Pan American Games
Gold medal – first place	1991 Havana	Team
Gold medal – first place	1995 Mar del Plata	Team
Gold medal – first place	1999 Winnipeg	Team
Silver medal – second place	1989 Indianapolis	Team
Pan American Championship
Gold medal – first place	1996 Colorado Springs
Gold medal – first place	1998 Havana
Silver medal – second place	2000 São Bernardo do Campo

Rolando Uríos Fonseca (born 27 January 1971) is a former handball player. Born in Cuba, he played for both the Cuba and the Spain national teams. He was considered one of the best pivots in the world in the first years of the 2000s.

Uríos won the World Championship in 2005 in Tunisia with the Spanish national team.

== Career ==
Uríos started playing handball at ESPA Havanna in Cuba. He moved to Europe for the first time in 1997 to join Hungarian KC Fotex Veszprém. Here he won the Hungarian championship and cup in 1998.

The following summer he joined French side US Ivry HB. Already in 2000 he was voted as the club's pivot of the century.

In 2001 he joined Spanish team BM Ciudad Real. Here he won the 2002 and 2003 EHF Cup Winner's Cup, the Cope del Rey in 2003 and 2008, the Spanish championship in 2004, 2007, 2008 and 2009, the Copa ASOBAL in 2006 and 2008, the EHF Champions League in 2007 and 2009, and IHF Men's Super Globe in 2007 and 2008. In 2009 he retired due to chronic knee injuries. Ciudad Real has retired his number.

At the age of 51 he made a short comeback for the Spanish second tier side Vestas Alarcos de Ciudad Real.

=== National team ===
With Cube he won the Pan American Games in 1991, 1995 and 1999 and the 1989, 1994, 1996 and 1998 Pan American championships. He won a silver medal at the 2000 Pan American Championship, and was chosen as the player of the tournament.

He represented Cuba at the 1999 World Men's Handball Championship, where Cuba finished 8th, which is their best result ever. He was named best pivot of the tournament. The tournament included famously knocking out Denmark in the round of 16.

He competed with Cuba in the men's tournament at the 2000 Summer Olympics. Cuba suffered 5 defeats and was knocked out in the initial groups, but Uríos was despite that the 4th most scoring player at the tournament.

He later became a Spanish citizen and switched to representing Spain. He represented his new nation at the men's tournament at the 2004 Summer Olympics.

With Spain he won the 2005 in Tunisia. At the 2006 European Men's Handball Championship he won silver medals with Spain.

== Private life ==
His son Rolando Uríos Gonzáles is also a handball player.
