= Milton Fonseca Pelissari =

Brazilian handball player (born 1971)

Miltinho
Personal information
- Full name: Milton Fonseca Pelissari
- Born: 25 February 1971 (age 55) Santa Maria, Brazil
- Height: 182 cm (72 in)

Sport
- Sport: Handball
Medal record
Men's handball
Representing Brazil
Pan American Games
Silver medal – second place	1995 Mar del Plata	Team
Silver medal – second place	1999 Winnipeg	Team

Milton Fonseca Pelissari (born 25 February 1971), also known as Miltinho, is a Brazilian former handball player. He competed at the 1992 Summer Olympics and the 1996 Summer Olympics.
