= Osvaldo Inocente Filho =

Brazilian handball player (born 1965)

Jabá
Personal information
- Full name: Osvaldo Inocente Filho
- Born: 22 July 1965 (age 61) Bela Vista, Brazil
- Height: 195 cm (77 in)

Sport
- Sport: Handball
Medal record
Men's handball
Representing Brazil
Pan American Games
Bronze medal – third place	1987 Indianapolis	Team
Silver medal – second place	1991 Havana	Team
Silver medal – second place	1995 Mar del Plata	Team

Osvaldo Inocente Filho (born 22 July 1965), also known as Jabá, is a Brazilian handball player. He competed at the 1992 Summer Olympics and the 1996 Summer Olympics.
