= Ivan Raimundo Pinheiro =

Brazilian handball player (born 1965)

Petrolina
Personal information
- Full name: Ivan Raimundo Pinheiro
- Born: 22 November 1965 (age 60) Petrolina, Brazil
- Height: 192 cm (76 in)

Sport
- Sport: Handball
Medal record
Men's handball
Representing Brazil
Pan American Games
Silver medal – second place	1991 Havana	Team
Silver medal – second place	1995 Mar del Plata	Team
Silver medal – second place	1999 Winnipeg	Team

Ivan Raimundo Pinheiro (born 22 October 1965), also known as Petrolina, is a Brazilian former handball player. He competed in the men's tournament at the 1996 Summer Olympics.
