= 2000 Pan American Men's Handball Championship =

Tournament details
- Host country: Brazil
- Venue: 1 (in 1 host city)
- Dates: 23–28 May
- Teams: 8 (from 1 confederation)

Final positions
- Champions: Argentina (1st title)
- Runners-up: Cuba
- Third place: Brazil
- Fourth place: United States

Tournament statistics
- Matches played: 20
- Goals scored: 1,016 (50.8 per match)
- Top scorer: (Dominican Republic) Antonio Sosa (54 goals)

Awards
- Best player: (Cuba) Rolando Uríos

The 2000 Pan American Men's Handball Championship was the ninth edition of the tournament, held in São Bernardo do Campo, Brazil from 23 to 28 May 2000. It acted as the American qualifying tournament for the 2001 World Championship, where the top four placed teams qualified.

== Preliminary round ==
All times are local (UTC−3).

=== Group A ===
Pos	Team	Pld	W	D	L	GF	GA	GD	Pts	Qualification
1	Argentina	3	3	0	0	69	50	+19	6	Semifinals
2	Cuba	3	2	0	1	90	55	+35	4	Semifinals
3	Greenland	3	1	0	2	62	75	−13	2	
4	Uruguay	3	0	0	3	57	98	−41	0	

Source: Todor66
Rules for classification: 1) points; 2) head-to-head points; 3) head-to-head goal difference; 4) head-to-head number of goals scored; 5) goal difference.

23 May 2000	Cuba	41–17	Uruguay
23 May 2000		(22–8)

23 May 2000	Argentina	20–16	Greenland
23 May 2000		(11–8)

24 May 2000	Argentina	28–14	Uruguay
24 May 2000		(12–9)

24 May 2000	Cuba	29–17	Greenland
24 May 2000		(13–7)

25 May 2000	Greenland	29–26	Uruguay
25 May 2000		(15–9)

25 May 2000	Argentina	21–20	Cuba
25 May 2000		(9–10)

=== Group B ===
Pos	Team	Pld	W	D	L	GF	GA	GD	Pts	Qualification
1	Brazil (H)	3	3	0	0	121	42	+79	6	Semifinals
2	United States	3	2	0	1	63	80	−17	4	Semifinals
3	Dominican Republic	3	1	0	2	75	105	−30	2	
4	Mexico	3	0	0	3	61	93	−32	0	

Source: Todor66
Rules for classification: 1) points; 2) head-to-head points; 3) head-to-head goal difference; 4) head-to-head number of goals scored; 5) goal difference.
(H) Hosts

23 May 2000	United States	25–17	Mexico
23 May 2000		(9–7)

23 May 2000	Brazil	47–18	Dominican Republic
23 May 2000		(25–10)

24 May 2000	United States	27–24	Dominican Republic
24 May 2000		(12–11)

24 May 2000	Brazil	35–13	Mexico
24 May 2000		(18–5)

25 May 2000	Dominican Republic	33–31	Mexico
25 May 2000		(15–12)

25 May 2000	Brazil	39–11	United States
25 May 2000		(17–5)

== Knockout stage ==
=== Bracket ===
Semi-finals
Argentina	28
United States	18
Brazil	24
Cuba	26

Final
Argentina	26
Cuba	25
Third place
United States	17
Brazil	38

Fifth place bracket

Semi-finals
Greenland	35
Mexico	18
Dominican Republic (ET)	34
Uruguay	30

Final
Greenland	27
Dominican Republic	21
Third place
Mexico (ET)	22
Uruguay	19

=== 5–8th place semifinals ===
26 May 2000	Greenland	35–18	Mexico
26 May 2000		(18–7)

26 May 2000
Dominican Republic
34–30 (ET)
Uruguay

(13–11)

FT: 26–26 ET: 8–4

=== Semifinals ===
27 May 2000	Argentina	28–18	United States
27 May 2000		(18–7)

27 May 2000	Cuba	26–24	Brazil
27 May 2000		(10–13)

=== Seventh place game ===
27 May 2000
Mexico
22–19 (ET)
Uruguay

(9–11)

FT: 19–19 ET: 3–0

=== Fifth place game ===
28 May 2000	Greenland	27–21	Dominican Republic
28 May 2000		(16–8)

=== Third place game ===
28 May 2000	Brazil	38–17	United States
28 May 2000		(19–10)

=== Final ===
28 May 2000	Argentina	26–25	Cuba
28 May 2000		(14–14)

== Final ranking ==
Qualified for the 2001 World Championship

Rank	Team
Gold medal	Argentina
Silver medal	Cuba
Bronze medal	Brazil
4	United States
5	Greenland
6	Dominican Republic
7	Mexico
8	Uruguay

Argentina, Cuba, Brazil and United States are qualified for 2001 World Championship. Cuba finally withdrew and was replaced by Greenland.

== All-star team ==
Position	Player
Most valuable player	Rolando Uríos (CUB)
Goalkeeper	Cristian Cantoniero (ARG)
Right wing	Andrés Kogovsek (ARG)
Right back	Eric Gull (ARG)
Centre back	Félix Romero (CUB)
Left back	Bruno Souza (BRA)
Left wing	Hélio Justino (BRA)
Pivot	Rolando Uríos (CUB)
