= Marcelo Minhoto Ferraz de Sampaio =

Brazilian handball player (born 1964)

Xexa
Personal information
- Full name: Marcelo Minhoto Ferraz de Sampaio
- Born: 24 February 1964 (age 62) São Paulo, Brazil
- Height: 180 cm (71 in)

Sport
- Sport: Handball
Medal record
Men's handball
Representing Brazil
Pan American Games
Bronze medal – third place	1987 Indianapolis	Team
Silver medal – second place	1995 Mar del Plata	Team

Marcelo Minhoto Ferraz de Sampaio (born 24 February 1964), also known as Xexa, is a Brazilian handball player. He competed at the 1992 Summer Olympics and the 1996 Summer Olympics.
