= José Nenínger =

Cuban handball player (born 1958)

Personal information
- Full name: José Orbein Nenínger Rodríguez
- Born: 26 July 1958 (age 68) Matanzas, Cuba
- Height: 194 cm (76 in)

Sport
- Sport: Handball
National team
Years	Team	Apps
–	Cuba	385
Medal record
Men's handball
Representing Cuba
Pan American Games
Silver medal – second place	1987 Indianapolis	Team

José Orbein Nenínger Rodríguez (Note: In this Spanish name, the first or paternal surname is Nenínger and the second or maternal family name is Rodríguez.) (born 26 July 1958) is a Cuban handball player. He competed in the men's tournament at the 1980 Summer Olympics, where Cuba finished 11th.
