= José Ronaldo do Nascimento =

Brazilian handball player (born 1966)

SB
Personal information
- Full name: José Ronaldo do Nascimento
- Born: 16 March 1966 (age 60) Aracaju, Brazil
- Height: 184 cm (72 in)

Sport
- Sport: Handball
Medal record
Men's handball
Representing Brazil
Pan American Games
Bronze medal – third place	1987 Indianapolis	Team
Silver medal – second place	1991 Havana	Team
Silver medal – second place	1995 Mar del Plata	Team
Gold medal – first place	2003 Santo Domingo	Team

José Ronaldo do Nascimento (born 16 March 1966), also known as SB, is a Brazilian handball player. He competed at the 1992 Summer Olympics, the 1996 Summer Olympics and the 2004 Summer Olympics.
