= Marcos Antônio Cezar =

Brazilian handball player (born 1970)

Marquinhos
Personal information
- Full name: Marcos Antônio Cezar
- Born: 27 June 1970 (age 56) Descanso, Brazil
- Height: 186 cm (73 in)

Sport
- Sport: Handball
Medal record
Men's handball
Representing Brazil
Pan American Games
Silver medal – second place	1995 Mar del Plata	Team

Marcos Antônio Cezar (born 27 June 1970), also known as Marquinhos, is a Brazilian handball player. He competed in the men's tournament at the 1996 Summer Olympics.
