= Roberto Julián Duranona =

Cuban handball player (born 1965)

Julián Duranona
Personal information
- Full name: Róberto Julián Duranona Larduet
- Nationality: Cuban / Icelandic
- Born: 8 December 1965 (age 60) Cuba
- Height: 2.02 m (6 ft 8 in)

Sport
- Sport: Handball
- Position: Left back
- Current club: Retired

Senior clubs
- Years: Team
- –1995: SC Havanna
- 1995–1997: KA Akureyri
- 1997–2000: ThSV Eisenach
- 2000–2002: TuS N-Lübbecke
- 2002–2003: HSG Wetzlar
- 2003–2004: TSV Hannover-Burgdorf
- 2004–2005: HSG Vulkan Vogelsberg
- 2005–2006: BM Castellón
National team
Years	Team	Apps	
?–1994	Cuba	270	
1996–200?	Iceland	61	(202)
Medal record
Men's handball
Representing Cuba
Pan American Games
Silver medal – second place	1987 Indianapolis	Team
Gold medal – first place	1991 Havana	Team
Central American and Caribbean Games
Gold medal – first place	1993 Ponce	Team

Róberto Julián Duranona Larduet (Note: In this Spanish name, the first or paternal surname is Duranona and the second or maternal family name is Larduet.) (born 8 December 1965) is a Cuban-Icelandic former handball player. He played left back.

Duranona participated with the Cuba men's national handball team on the World Men's Handball Championship in 1986, where his team finished 15th out of 16, but with 50 goals he finished second on the top goalscorers list behind Jae-Won Kang of Korea. Four years later in 1990, Cuba finished 14th out of 16, but Duranona became the top scorer of the tournament with 55 goals, tied with Aleksandr Tuchkin of the Soviet Union. He gained all together 270 caps in the Cuban national team.

In 1994 Duranona went to Argentina to complete his degree in physical education. In 1995 he moved to play for KA Akureyri in Iceland, where he also got the citizenship, and played 61 times for the Iceland men's national handball team, scoring 202 goals. In 1997 he changed to ThSV Eisenach in Germany, where he scored 426 goals in three seasons. In 2000 he moved to TuS Nettelstedt, from where in 2002 he switched to HSG Wetzlar. His last known team was Castellón in Spain where he moved in 2006.

He was 202 cm tall, weighed 110 kg, and wore size 51 shoes.
