= Agberto Matos =

Brazilian handball player (1972–2026)

Agberto

Personal information
- Full name: Agberto Correa de Matos
- Born: 8 April 1972 Santos, São Paulo, Brazil
- Died: 8 May 2026 (aged 54)
- Height: 1.93 m (6 ft 4 in)

Sport
- Sport: Handball
- Position: left back

Senior clubs
- Years: Team
- –: São Bernardo do Campo
National team
- Years: Team
- –: Brazil
Medal record
Men's handball
Representing Brazil
Pan American Games
| Silver medal – second place | 1995 Mar del Plata | Team |

Agberto Correa de Matos (8 April 1972 – 8 May 2026), known as Agberto, was a Brazilian handball player. He was a member of the Brazil men's national handball team, playing as a left back. Matos was a part of the team at the 1996 Summer Olympics and 2004 Summer Olympics. He was a member of São Bernardo do Campo from 2003 to 2006. Matos died on 8 May 2026, at the age of 54.
