= Eduardo Henrique Reis =

Brazilian handball player (born 1970)

Mineiro
Personal information
- Full name: Eduardo Henrique dos Reis
- Born: 7 March 1970 (age 56) Belo Horizonte, Brazil
- Height: 1.90 m (6 ft 3 in)

Sport
- Sport: Handball
Medal record
Men's handball
Representing Brazil
Pan American Games
Silver medal – second place	1995 Mar del Plata	Team
Gold medal – first place	2003 Santo Domingo	Team

Eduardo Henrique dos Reis (born 7 March 1970), known as Mineiro, is a Brazilian handball player. He competed in the men's tournament at the 2004 Summer Olympics.
