= William Kessler (handballer) =

American handball player

Bill Kessler
Personal information
- Full name: William Michael Kessler
- Nationality: American
- Born: October 29, 1962 (age 63) New York City, New York, U.S.
- Height: 6 ft 2 in (1.88 m)

Sport
- Sport: Handball
Medal record
Men's handball
Representing the United States
Goodwill Games
| Silver medal – second place | 1986 Moscow | Team |
Pan American Games
| Gold medal – first place | 1987 Indianapolis | Team |
| Bronze medal – third place | 1991 Havana | Team |

William Michael Kessler (born October 29, 1962) is an American former handball player who competed in the 1984 Summer Olympics and in the 1988 Summer Olympics.
