= Darrick Heath =

American handball player

Personal information
- Nationality: American
- Born: October 12, 1964 (age 62)
- Height: 6 ft 4 in (1.93 m)

Sport
- Sport: Handball
Medal record
Men's handball
Representing the United States
Pan American Games
Bronze medal – third place	1991 Havana	Team

Darrick Heath (born October 12, 1964) is an American former handball player. He competed in the men's tournament at the 1996 Summer Olympics. After his playing career, Heath became a coach, and coached the national team.

== Biography ==
Heath was born in 1964 and attended Finger Lakes Community College. He then went to C. W. Post College where he played basketball.

After playing handball for a local club in Long Island, he eventually made his way onto the US National Team. In 1988, 1989 and 1993 he was part of the team that won national titles in handball. For the next two years, Heath moved to Europe, playing professionally in Budapest, Hungary and Graz, Austria. In 1993, Heath was also named the U.S. Team Handball Male Athlete of the Year.

At the 1996 Summer Olympics in Atlanta, Heath was part of the American team that finished in ninth place in the men's tournament. However, Heath would later suffer a spinal injury in a car crash, which ended his playing career.

After playing for the US National Team until 2003, Heath became a handball coach, and coached the national team during the 2011/12 season. He helped the US team reach the 2011 Pan American Games, the first time that the US team had qualified for the games since 2003. He was also a lecturer at Emory University in Atlanta for ten years from 2002 to 2012, and featured in a university paper.

Since leaving handball, he has entered the automotive industry, and currently is a Genesis Sales Representative at Eastern Shore Genesis in Daphne, AL.
