= Gustavo Henrique Silva =

Brazilian handball player (born 1979)

Guga
Personal information
- Full name: Gustavo Henrique Lopes da Silva
- Born: 28 April 1979 (age 47) Recife, Brazil
- Height: 1.90 m (6 ft 3 in)

Sport
- Sport: Handball
Medal record
Men's handball
Representing Brazil
Pan American Games
Silver medal – second place	1999 Winnipeg	Team
Gold medal – first place	2003 Santo Domingo	Team

Gustavo Henrique Lopes da Silva (born 28 April 1979), known as Guga, is a Brazilian handball player. He competed in the men's tournament at the 2004 Summer Olympics.
