= Alexandre Vasconcelos =

Brazilian handball player (born 1978)

Alê Vasconcelos
Personal information
- Full name: Alexandre Morelli Vasconcelos
- Born: 19 December 1978 (age 47) Maringá, Paraná, Brazil
- Height: 1.94 m (6 ft 4 in)

Sport
- Sport: Handball
Medal record
Men's handball
Representing Brazil
Pan American Games
Silver medal – second place	1999 Winnipeg	Team
Gold medal – first place	2003 Santo Domingo	Team
Gold medal – first place	2007 Rio de Janeiro	Team

Alexandre Morelli Vasconcelos (born 19 December 1978), known as Alê Vasconcelos, is a Brazilian handball player who plays for the Brazilian national team. He was born in Maringá. He participated at the 2004 Summer Olympics, where Brazil placed 10th, and at the 2008 Summer Olympics, where the Brazilian team placed 11th.

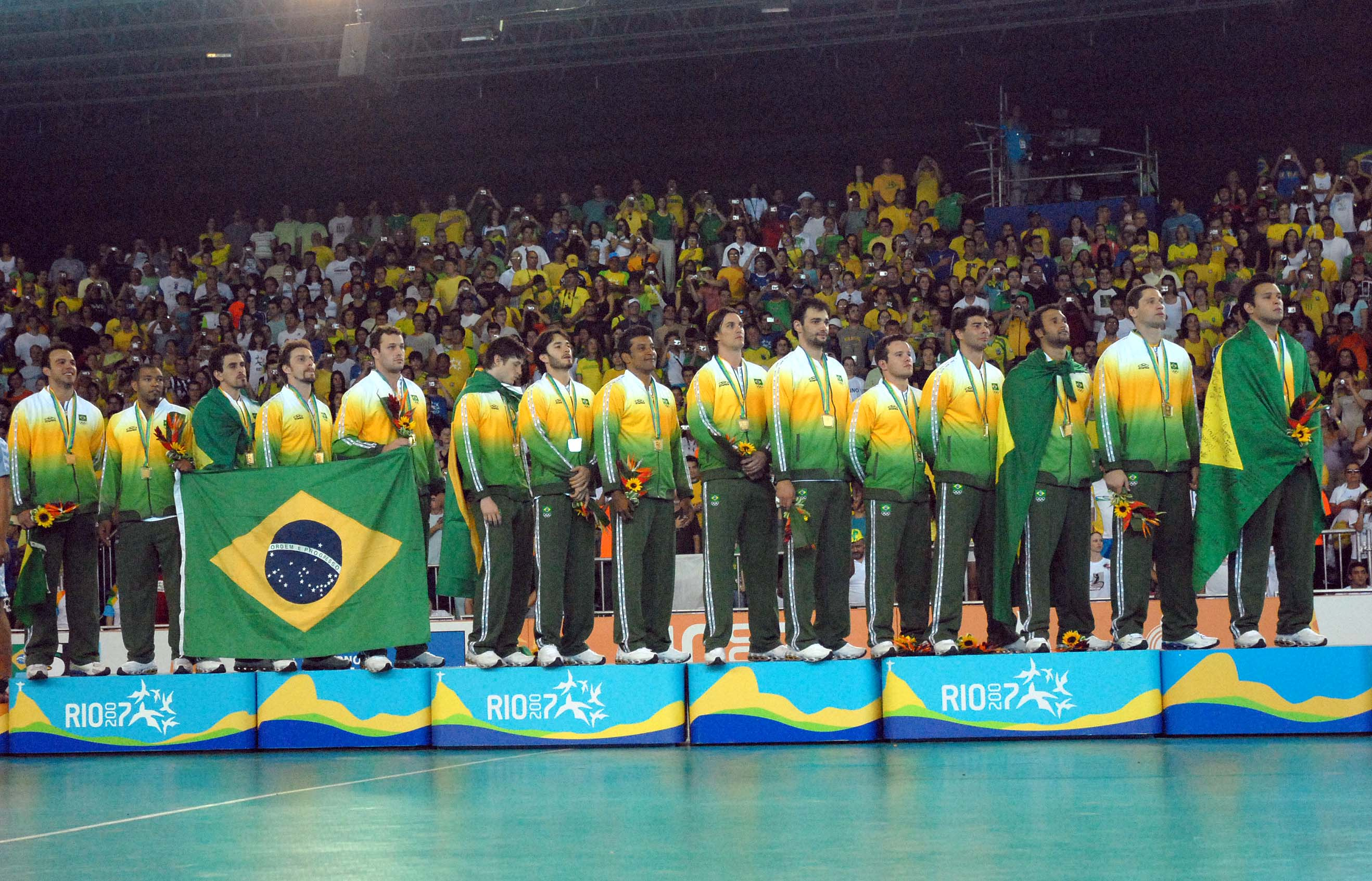
Brazilian men's team on podium after winning gold at 2007 Pan American Games.
