= Bryant Johnson (handballer) =

American handball player

Personal information
- Full name: Bryant O. Johnson
- Born: October 7, 1959 (age 66) Washington, D.C., U.S.
- Height: 6 ft 7 in (2.00 m)

Sport
- University team: Ohio State (basketball)
Medal record
Men's handball
Representing the United States
Pan American Games
Bronze medal – third place	1991 Havana	Team

Bryant O. Johnson (born October 7, 1959) is an American former handball player who competed in the 1988 Summer Olympics. He is currently the Assistant Director of Solid Waste/General Services for Hillsboro County, FL and has been a part-time faculty member at the University of Tampa.

A graduate of Ohio State University, Johnson was a member of the men's basketball team.
