= Handball at the 2003 Pan American Games =

The Handball Tournament at the 2003 Pan American Games took place at Handball Hall in Santo Domingo, Dominican Republic. There was two competitions with one each for each gender. Cuba was the defending champion in the men's while Brazil were the defending champion in the women.

The tournament took place between August 2 to 11 with the winning sides of both the men’s and women’s tournament will directly qualify for the 2004 Olympic Handball Tournaments. That nation would be Brazil who would win both tournaments over Argentina.

== Medal winners ==
Event	Gold	Silver	Bronze
Men	Brazil Alexandre Folhas; Jardel Pizzinatto; José Ronaldo do Nascimento; Jair Henrique Alves Junior; Renato Tupan Ruy; Bruno Souza; Jaqson Kojoroski; Hélio Justino; Daniel Baldacin; Alexandre Vasconcelos; Winglitton Rocha Barros; Eduardo Henrique Reis; Marcos Santos; Fábio Vanini; Gustavo Henrique Silva	Argentina Rodolfo Jung; Fernando García; Sergio Crevatín; Alejo Carrara; Lucas Cruz; Martín Viscovich; Bruno Civelli; Andrés Kogovsek; Eric Gull; Christian Plati; Alejandro Mariné; Cristian Canzoniero; Federico Besasso; Gonzalo Viscovich; Gonzalo Carou; Mariano Larre	United States Danny Hennessy; Mohamed El Gammal; Tom Fitzgerald; Joe Fitzgerald; Joseph Lamour; Kevin Williams; Jon Sampson; Timothy Lawrence; Gary Hines; John Kelly; Divine Jackson; Matt Van Houten; Robert Dunn; Michael Thornberry; Italo Zanzi; David Thompson
Women	Brazil Darly de Paula; Fabiana Diniz; Alexandra do Nascimento; Margareth Montão; Silvia Pinheiro; Célia Coppi; Daniela Piedade; Aline Rosas; Tayra Rodrigues; Juceli Rosa; Aline Silva; Cristina Silva; Idalina Mesquita; Sandra de Oliveira; Viviane Jacques	Argentina Marianela Larroca; Mariana Mansilla; Maricel Bueno; Eliana Fontana; Giselle Pintos; Guadalupe Román; Magdalena Decilio; Georgina Visciglia; Natacha Melillo; María Barile; Sabrina Nievas; Valentina Kogan; Florencia Am; Pamela Sampietro; Karina Seif; Bibiana Ferrera	Uruguay Victoria Graña; N’Haloy Laicouschi; Cecilia Schwedt; Ivanna Scavino; Silvana de Armas; Marcela Schelotto; Mercedes Amor; María Terragno; Mariana Fleitas; Verónica Castro; Florencia Polcaro; Jussara Castro; Lorena Estefanell; María Uriarte; Sofía Griot

== Men's Competition ==
=== Preliminary round ===
==== Group A ====
Pos	Team	Pld	W	D	L	GF	GA	GD	Pts	Qualification
1	Argentina	3	3	0	0	119	50	+69	6	Semifinals
2	United States	3	2	0	1	75	74	+1	4	Semifinals
3	Mexico	3	1	0	2	70	90	−20	2	5–8th place semifinals
4	Puerto Rico	3	0	0	3	59	109	−50	0	5–8th place semifinals

Rules for classification: 1) points; 2) head-to-head points; 3) head-to-head goal difference; 4) head-to-head goals scored; 5) goal difference; 6) goals scored; 7) draw.

2 August 2003; 15:15	Argentina	46–15	Mexico	Handball Hall
2 August 2003; 15:15	G. Viscovich 9	(19−9)	five players 2	Handball Hall
2 August 2003; 15:15	2× (yellow card) 2× (suspension)	Report	3× (yellow card) 2× (suspension)	Handball Hall

2 August 2003; 18:45	Puerto Rico	24–31	United States	Handball Hall
2 August 2003; 18:45	Cepeda, Gutiérrez 5	(7−17)	Hines 12	Handball Hall
2 August 2003; 18:45	2× (yellow card) 2× (suspension)	Report	3× (yellow card) 8× (suspension) 1× (red card)	Handball Hall

3 August 2003; 15:15	Puerto Rico	19–33	Mexico	Handball Hall
3 August 2003; 15:15	three players 3	(8−14)	three players 8	Handball Hall
3 August 2003; 15:15	3× (yellow card) 7× (suspension)	Report	2× (yellow card) 8× (suspension)	Handball Hall

3 August 2003; 18:45	United States	19–28	Argentina	Handball Hall
3 August 2003; 18:45	Hines 6	(11−14)	Kogovsek 9	Handball Hall
3 August 2003; 18:45	3× (yellow card) 5× (suspension) 1× (red card)	Report	3× (yellow card) 3× (suspension) 2× (red card)	Handball Hall

5 August 2003; 17:00	Mexico	22–25	United States	Handball Hall
5 August 2003; 17:00	three players 4	(9−13)	El Gammal 9	Handball Hall
5 August 2003; 17:00	2× (yellow card) 6× (suspension)	Report	3× (yellow card) 7× (suspension)	Handball Hall

5 August 2003; 20:30	Argentina	45–16	Puerto Rico	Handball Hall
5 August 2003; 20:30	Cruz 11	(23−8)	Gutiérrez, Santiago 3	Handball Hall
5 August 2003; 20:30	3× (yellow card) 2× (suspension)	Report	3× (yellow card) 4× (suspension)	Handball Hall

==== Group B ====
Pos	Team	Pld	W	D	L	GF	GA	GD	Pts	Qualification
1	Brazil	3	3	0	0	105	47	+58	6	Semifinals
2	Uruguay	3	2	0	1	73	86	−13	4	Semifinals
3	Dominican Republic (H)	3	1	0	2	66	89	−23	2	5–8th place semifinals
4	Chile	3	0	0	3	63	85	−22	0	5–8th place semifinals

Rules for classification: 1) points; 2) head-to-head points; 3) head-to-head goal difference; 4) head-to-head goals scored; 5) goal difference; 6) goals scored; 7) draw.
(H) Hosts

2 August 2003; 17:00	Brazil	35–16	Dominican Republic
2 August 2003; 17:00	Barros 8	(21−7)	K. de León 4
2 August 2003; 17:00	3× (yellow card) 3× (suspension)	Report	3× (yellow card) 4× (suspension)

2 August 2003; 20:30	Uruguay	26–25	Chile
2 August 2003; 20:30	Correa, Viacava 7	(10−13)	Feuchtmann 8
2 August 2003; 20:30	3× (yellow card) 10× (suspension) 2× (red card)	Report	3× (yellow card) 14× (suspension) 2× (red card)

3 August 2003; 17:00	Uruguay	30–25	Dominican Republic
3 August 2003; 17:00	Correa 6	(18−13)	K. de León 6
3 August 2003; 17:00	3× (yellow card) 6× (suspension)	Report	3× (yellow card) 5× (suspension)

3 August 2003; 20:30	Chile	14–34	Brazil
3 August 2003; 20:30	Montes 3	(7−14)	Vanini 7
3 August 2003; 20:30	4× (yellow card) 5× (suspension) 1× (red card)	Report	4× (yellow card) 4× (suspension)

5 August 2003; 15:15	Dominican Republic	25–24	Chile
5 August 2003; 15:15	K. de León 7	(12−14)	Feuchtmann 9
5 August 2003; 15:15	3× (yellow card) 6× (suspension)	Report	3× (yellow card) 6× (suspension)

5 August 2003; 18:45	Brazil	36–17	Uruguay
5 August 2003; 18:45	Barros 8	(21−9)	Viacava 5
5 August 2003; 18:45	3× (yellow card) 3× (suspension) 1× (red card)	Report	3× (yellow card) 6× (suspension) 2× (red card)

=== Knockout stage ===
==== Bracket ====
Semifinals
7 August
Argentina	36
Uruguay	17
7 August
Brazil	34
United States	20

Final
11 August
Argentina	30
Brazil (OT)	31
Third place
11 August
Uruguay	23
United States	25

5–8th place semifinals
7 August
Mexico	19
Chile	25
7 August
Dominican Republic	34
Puerto Rico (OT)	39

Fifth place
9 August
Chile	26
Puerto Rico	23
Seventh place
9 August
Mexico	32
Dominican Republic	35

==== 5–8th place semifinals ====
7 August 2003; 15:00	Mexico	19–25	Chile
7 August 2003; 15:00	Rojas 5	(10−10)	Feuchtmann 5
7 August 2003; 15:00	3× (yellow card) 6× (suspension)	Report	4× (yellow card) 5× (suspension) 1× (red card)

7 August 2003
17:00
Dominican Republic
34–39 (ET)
Puerto Rico

K. de León 7
(14−13)
Cepeda 9
3× (yellow card) 11× (suspension)
Report
2× (yellow card) 5× (suspension) 1× (red card)

FT: 31−31 ET: 3−8

==== Semifinals ====
7 August 2003; 19:00	Argentina	36–17	Uruguay
7 August 2003; 19:00	Kogovsek 9	(17−9)	Correa 5
7 August 2003; 19:00	3× (yellow card) 2× (suspension)	Report	3× (yellow card) 1× (suspension)

7 August 2003; 21:00	Brazil	34–20	United States
7 August 2003; 21:00	Nascimento 8	(16−12)	Dunn 5
7 August 2003; 21:00	2× (yellow card) 3× (suspension)	Report	3× (yellow card) 9× (suspension)

==== Seventh place game ====
9 August 2003; 15:00	Mexico	32–35	Dominican Republic
9 August 2003; 15:00	Rojas 8	(15−17)	K. de León 9
9 August 2003; 15:00	4× (yellow card) 4× (suspension)	Report	3× (yellow card) 5× (suspension)

==== Fifth place game ====
9 August 2003; 17:00	Chile	26–23	Puerto Rico
9 August 2003; 17:00	Soto 7	(13−9)	Cepeda, Pizarro 6
9 August 2003; 17:00	5× (yellow card) 6× (suspension) 1× (red card)	Report	3× (yellow card) 4× (suspension)

==== Bronze medal game ====
11 August 2003; 10:00	Uruguay	23–25	United States
11 August 2003; 10:00	Viacava 7	(11−14)	J. Fitzgerald 5
11 August 2003; 10:00	4× (yellow card) 3× (suspension) 1× (red card)	Report	3× (yellow card) 9× (suspension) 1× (red card)

==== Gold medal game ====
11 August 2003
12:00
Argentina
30–31 (ET)
Brazil

Attendance: 300
Referees: Baum, Góralczyk (POL)
Gull 8
(16−12)
Souza 7
3× (yellow card) 8× (suspension) 1× (red card)
Report
5× (yellow card) 9× (suspension) 1× (red card)

FT: 24−24 ET: 6−7

=== Ranking and statistics ===
Rank	Team
1st place, gold medalist(s)	Brazil
2nd place, silver medalist(s)	Argentina
3rd place, bronze medalist(s)	United States
4	Uruguay
5	Chile
6	Puerto Rico
7	Dominican Republic
8	Mexico

Qualified for the 2004 Summer Olympics

2003 Pan American Games winners

Brazil
First title

==== Top scorers ====
Rank	Name	Goals	Shots	%
1	(Argentina) Andrés Kogovsek	37	45	82
2	(Dominican Republic) Kelvin de León	33	50	66
3	(United States) Gary Hines	31	52	59
4	(Argentina) Eric Gull	30	54	55
5	(Brazil) Winglitton Rocha Barros	29	45	64
5	(Chile) Emil Feuchtmann	29	52	55

Source: Santo Domingo 2003

==== Top goalkeepers ====
(minimum 20% of total shots received by team)

Rank	Name	%	Saves	Shots
1	(Brazil) Marcos Santos	48	39	81
2	(Argentina) Fernando García	45	34	74
3	(Brazil) Alexandre Vasconcelos	42	41	96
3	(United States) Italo Zanzi	42	42	99
5	(Chile) Felipe Barrientos	39	59	148

Source: Santo Domingo 2003

== Women's tournament ==
=== Preliminary round ===
Pos	Team	Pld	W	D	L	GF	GA	GD	Pts	Qualification
1	Brazil	5	5	0	0	200	68	+132	10	Semifinals
2	Argentina	5	3	1	1	126	113	+13	7	Semifinals
3	United States	5	3	0	2	109	123	−14	6	Semifinals
4	Uruguay	5	2	1	2	137	125	+12	5	Semifinals
5	Dominican Republic (H)	5	1	0	4	91	163	−72	2	Fifth place game
6	Mexico	5	0	0	5	90	161	−71	0	Fifth place game

Source: Santo Domingo 2003
Rules for classification: 1) points; 2) head-to-head points; 3) head-to-head goal difference; 4) head-to-head goals scored; 5) goal difference; 6) goals scored; 7) draw.
(H) Hosts

2 August 2003; 09:00	Brazil	36–13	United States
2 August 2003; 09:00	Pinheiro 9	(15−5)	Eagen 4
2 August 2003; 09:00	3× (yellow card)	Report	3× (yellow card) 9× (suspension)

2 August 2003; 10:45	Argentina	32–21	Mexico
2 August 2003; 10:45	Seif 9	(15−4)	Gutiérrez 5
2 August 2003; 10:45	2× (yellow card) 6× (suspension)	Report	3× (yellow card) 4× (suspension)

2 August 2003; 12:30	Uruguay	35–23	Dominican Republic
2 August 2003; 12:30	Uriarte 9	(15−10)	Hernández 8
2 August 2003; 12:30	2× (yellow card) 4× (suspension)	Report	3× (yellow card) 5× (suspension) 1× (red card)

3 August 2003; 09:00	United States	19–25	Argentina
3 August 2003; 09:00	Batar 6	(12−11)	Seif 7
3 August 2003; 09:00	3× (yellow card) 5× (suspension)	Report	3× (yellow card) 5× (suspension) 1× (red card)

3 August 2003; 10:45	Dominican Republic	6–48	Brazil
3 August 2003; 10:45	Hernández, Rosa 3	(0−26)	Coppi 9
3 August 2003; 10:45	2× (yellow card) 8× (suspension)	Report	3× (yellow card) 1× (suspension)

3 August 2003; 12:30	Mexico	19–37	Uruguay
3 August 2003; 12:30	Lara 4	(7−19)	Estefanell 6
3 August 2003; 12:30	3× (yellow card) 4× (suspension)	Report	2× (yellow card) 2× (suspension)

4 August 2003; 17:00	Brazil	46–10	Mexico
4 August 2003; 17:00	Mesquita 10	(21−4)	Serna 4
4 August 2003; 17:00	3× (yellow card) 2× (suspension)	Report	3× (yellow card)

4 August 2003; 18:45	Argentina	23–23	Uruguay
4 August 2003; 18:45	Melillo, Seif 5	(8−13)	three players 5
4 August 2003; 18:45	4× (yellow card) 7× (suspension)	Report	4× (yellow card) 5× (suspension)

4 August 2003; 20:30	United States	30–23	Dominican Republic
4 August 2003; 20:30	Batar 8	(16−13)	Hernández 9
4 August 2003; 20:30	3× (yellow card) 6× (suspension) 1× (red card)	Report	4× (yellow card) 9× (suspension) 1× (red card)

6 August 2003; 09:00	Argentina	28–16	Dominican Republic
6 August 2003; 09:00	Am 5	(17−9)	Peña 5
6 August 2003; 09:00	3× (yellow card) 6× (suspension)	Report	3× (yellow card) 8× (suspension) 1× (red card)

6 August 2003; 10:45	Uruguay	21–36	Brazil
6 August 2003; 10:45	Griot 5	(6−22)	A. Silva 9
6 August 2003; 10:45	3× (yellow card) 3× (suspension)	Report	4× (yellow card) 6× (suspension)

6 August 2003; 12:30	Mexico	18–23	United States
6 August 2003; 12:30	Esquivel 10	(10−14)	Martin 6
6 August 2003; 12:30	3× (yellow card) 4× (suspension)	Report	3× (yellow card) 6× (suspension)

7 August 2003; 09:00	Dominican Republic	23–22	Mexico
7 August 2003; 09:00	Rosa 7	(11−10)	Esquivel 6
7 August 2003; 09:00	3× (yellow card) 6× (suspension)	Report	2× (yellow card) 4× (suspension)

7 August 2003; 10:45	Uruguay	21–24	United States
7 August 2003; 10:45	Estefanell 6	(12−10)	three players 5
7 August 2003; 10:45	3× (yellow card) 1× (suspension)	Report	3× (yellow card) 2× (suspension)

7 August 2003; 12:30	Brazil	34–18	Argentina
7 August 2003; 12:30	A. Silva 7	(14−10)	Ferrera 4
7 August 2003; 12:30	3× (yellow card) 2× (suspension)	Report	3× (yellow card) 3× (suspension)

=== Knockout stage ===
==== Bracket ====
Semifinals
7 August
Brazil	46
Uruguay	14
7 August
Argentina (OT)	29
United States	26

Final
11 August
Brazil	40
Argentina	15
Third place
11 August
Uruguay	35
United States	21

==== Semifinals ====
9 August 2003; 10:00	Brazil	46–14	Uruguay
9 August 2003; 10:00	Nascimento 9	(23−7)	three players 3
9 August 2003; 10:00	3× (yellow card) 1× (suspension)	Report	2× (yellow card) 1× (suspension)

9 August 2003
12:00
Argentina
29–26 (ET)
United States

Seif 10
(11−12)
Batar 11
3× (yellow card) 4× (suspension) 1× (red card)
Report
4× (yellow card) 4× (suspension)

FT: 24−24 ET: 5−2

==== Fifth place game ====
11 August 2003; 15:00	Dominican Republic	25–20	Mexico
11 August 2003; 15:00	Sosa 6	(8−10)	three players 4
11 August 2003; 15:00	2× (yellow card) 11× (suspension)	Report	3× (yellow card) 5× (suspension)

==== Bronze medal game ====
12 August 2003; 10:00	Uruguay	35–21	United States
12 August 2003; 10:00	Castro 10	(16−10)	Batar 5
12 August 2003; 10:00	3× (yellow card) 3× (suspension)	Report	3× (yellow card) 3× (suspension)

==== Gold medal game ====
12 August 2003; 12:00	Brazil	40–15	Argentina
12 August 2003; 12:00	Nascimento, A. Silva 7	(20−6)	Visciglia 4
12 August 2003; 12:00	2× (yellow card) 4× (suspension)	Report	2× (yellow card) 5× (suspension)

=== Ranking and statistics ===
Rank	Team
1st place, gold medalist(s)	Brazil
2nd place, silver medalist(s)	Argentina
3rd place, bronze medalist(s)	Uruguay
4	United States
5	Dominican Republic
6	Mexico

Qualified for the 2004 Summer Olympics

2003 Pan American Games winners

Brazil
Second title

==== Top scorers ====
Rank	Name	Goals	Shots	%
1	(Brazil) Aline Silva	43	58	74
2	(United States) Edina Batar	40	58	68
3	(Uruguay) Jussara Castro	36	82	43
4	(Argentina) Karina Seif	34	75	45
4	(Dominican Republic) Crisleydi Hernández	34	83	40

Source: Santo Domingo 2003

==== Top goalkeepers ====
(minimum 20% of total shots received by team)

Rank	Name	%	Saves	Shots
1	(Brazil) Darly de Paula	55	68	123
1	(Brazil) Cristina Silva	55	52	94
3	(Uruguay) N’Haloy Laicouschi	40	72	179
4	(United States) Anca Hesser	37	62	165
5	(Argentina) Valentina Kogan	35	82	229

Source: Santo Domingo 2003

== Medal table ==
Place	Nation	Gold medal	Silver medal	Bronze medal	Total
1	Brazil	2	0	0	2
2	Argentina	0	2	0	2
3	United States	0	0	1	1
	Uruguay	0	0	1	1
Total		2	2	2	6

== See also ==
- List of Pan American Games medalists in handball (men)
