= John Keller (handballer) =

American handball player

Personal information
- Full name: John Herman Keller Jr.
- Nationality: American
- Born: October 5, 1965 (age 61)
- Height: 6 ft 4 in (1.93 m)

Sport
- Sport: Handball
Medal record
Men's handball
Representing the United States
Pan American Games
Bronze medal – third place	1991 Havana	Team

John Herman Keller Jr. (born October 5, 1965) is an American former handball player. He competed in the men's tournament at the 1996 Summer Olympics.
