= Ivan Bruno Maziero =

Brazilian handball player (born 1969)

Macarrão
Personal information
- Full name: Ivan Bruno Maziero
- Born: 1 June 1969 (age 57) Joaçaba, Brazil
- Height: 181 cm (71 in)

Sport
- Sport: Handball
Medal record
Men's handball
Representing Brazil
Pan American Games
Silver medal – second place	1991 Havana	Team
Silver medal – second place	1995 Mar del Plata	Team

Ivan Bruno Maziero (born 1 June 1969), commonly known as Macarrão, is a Brazilian handball player. He competed at the 1992 Summer Olympics, the 1996 Summer Olympics and the 2004 Summer Olympics.
