= United States women's national handball team =

United States

Information
- Association: USA Team Handball
- Coach: Sarah Gascon
- Captain: Julia Taylor

Colours
| 1st | 2nd |

Results

Summer Olympics
- Appearances: 4 (First in 1984)
- Best result: 5th place (1984)

World Championship
- Appearances: 5 (First in 1975)
- Best result: 11th place (1975, 1982)

Pan American Championship
- Appearances: 9 (First in 1986)
- Best result: (gold) Champions (1986, 1991)
- Last updated on Unknown.

United States women's national handball team
Medal record

Pan American Games
| Gold medal – first place | 1987 United States | Team |
| Gold medal – first place | 1995 Argentina | Team |

Pan American Championship
| Gold medal – first place | 1986 Brazil | |
| Gold medal – first place | 1991 Brazil | |
| Silver medal – second place | 1989 United States | |

Nor.Ca Handball Championship
| Silver medal – second place | 2017 Puerto Rico | |
| Bronze medal – third place | 2015 Puerto Rico | |

The United States women's national handball team is the national team of the United States. It takes part in international handball competitions.

At the 1982 World Women's Handball Championship in Hungary the U.S. team placed 11th. They also participated in the 1975, 1986, 1993 and 1995 IHF World Women's Handball Championship and the 1984, 1988, 1992 and 1996 Olympics.

== Results ==
=== Olympic Games ===
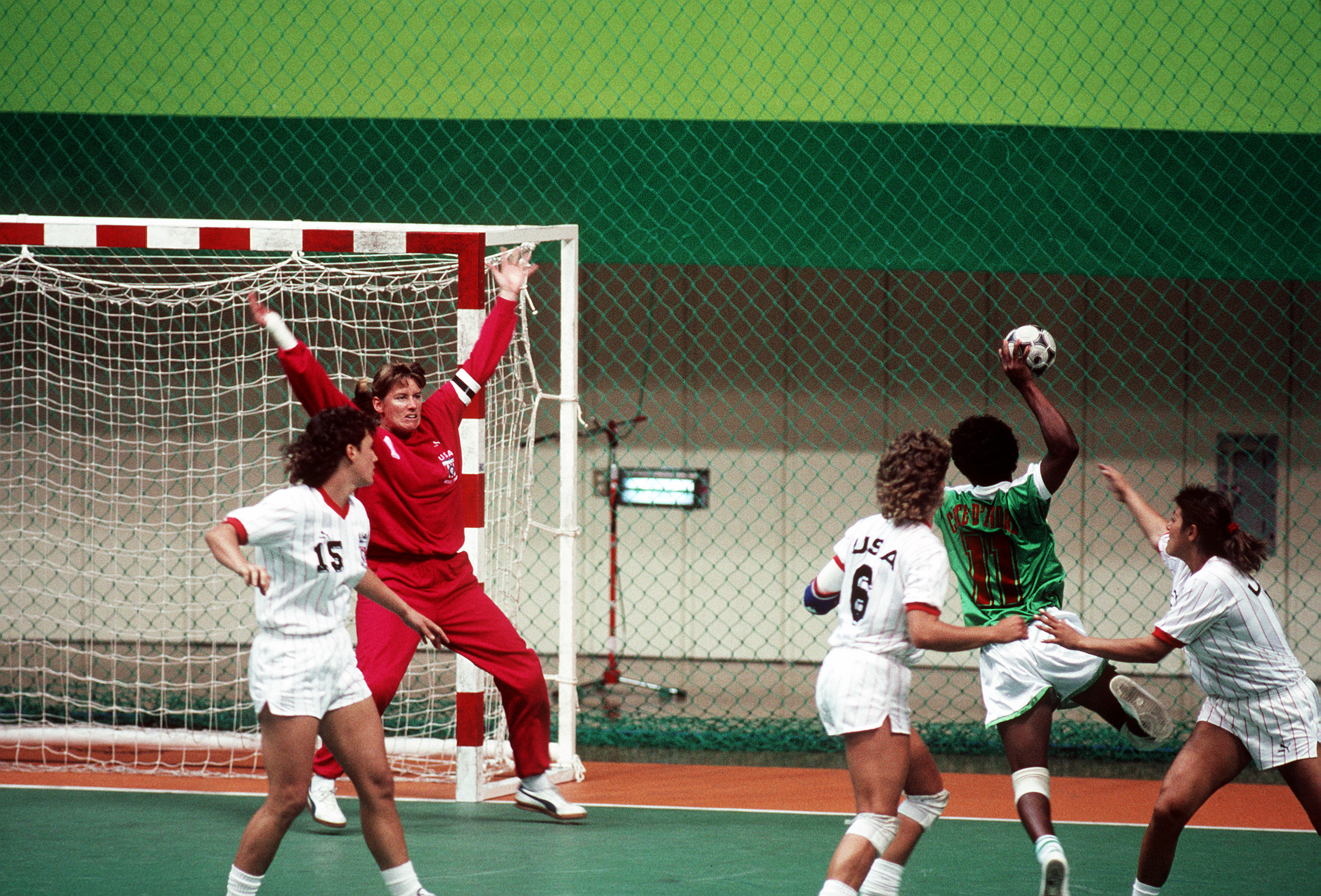
The US Women's handball team during a match against Ivory Coast at the 1988 Summer Olympics

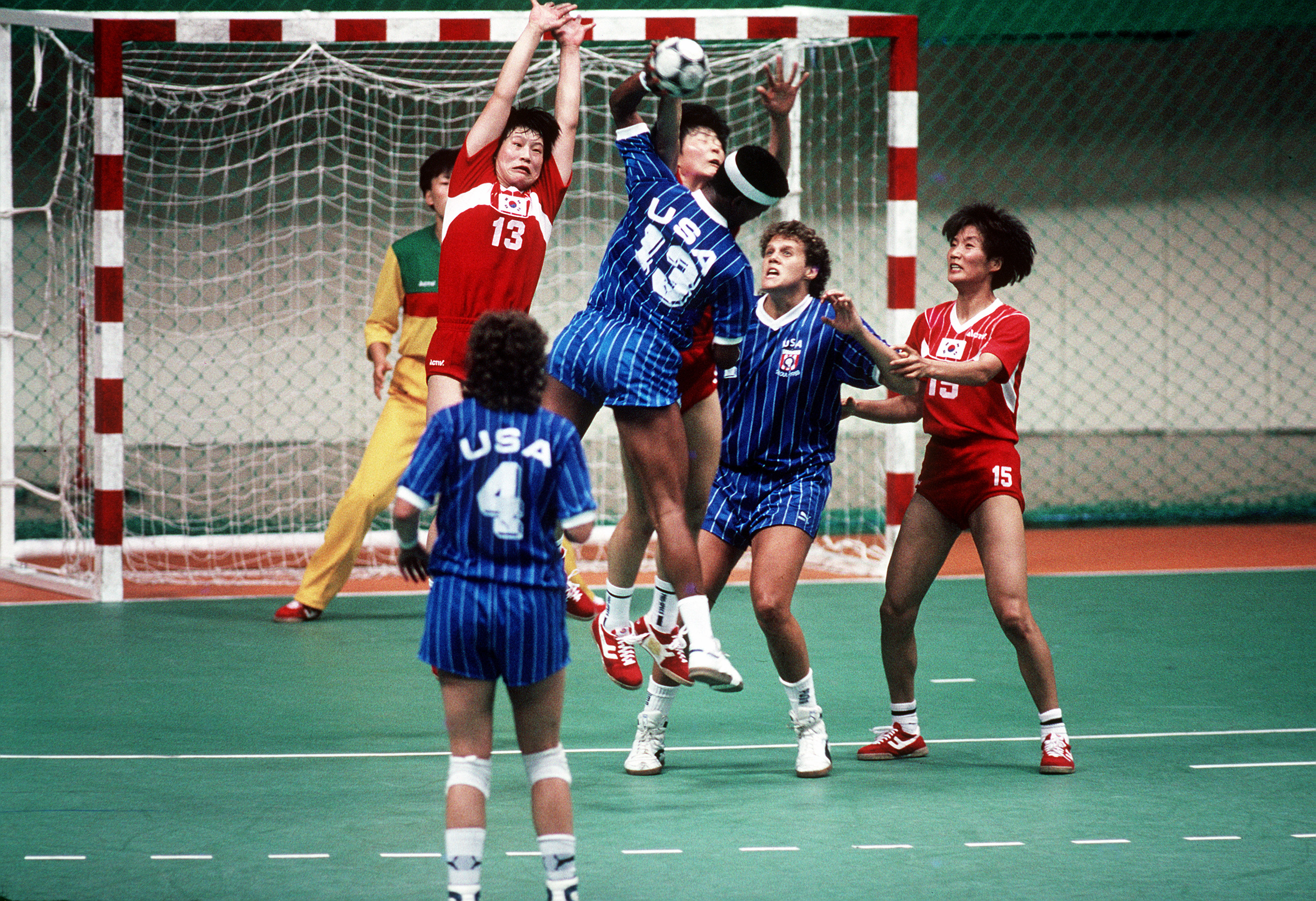
USA women's handball team against South Korea in the 1988 Summer Olympics

Since their first appearance in 1984, the U.S. has participated in four Olympic Games.

| Year | Position | Pld | W | D | L | GS | GA | +/– |
|---|---|---|---|---|---|---|---|---|
| (Canada) 1976 | did not qualify, 1980 boycott | | | | | | | |
| (Soviet Union) 1980 | did not qualify, 1980 boycott | | | | | | | |
| (United States) 1984 | 5th | 5 | 2 | 0 | 3 | 114 | 123 | −9 |
| (South Korea) 1988 | 7th | 6 | 1 | 0 | 5 | 123 | 156 | −33 |
| (Spain) 1992 | 6th | 4 | 1 | 0 | 3 | 72 | 102 | −30 |
| (United States) 1996 | 8th | 4 | 0 | 0 | 4 | 87 | 114 | −27 |
| (Australia) 2000 | did not qualify | | | | | | | |
| (Greece) 2004 | did not qualify | | | | | | | |
| (China) 2008 | did not qualify | | | | | | | |
| (United Kingdom) 2012 | did not qualify | | | | | | | |
| (Brazil) 2016 | did not qualify | | | | | | | |
| (Japan) 2020 | did not qualify | | | | | | | |
| (France) 2024 | did not qualify | | | | | | | |
| (United States) 2028 | qualified | | | | | | | |
| Total | 4/12 | 19 | 4 | 0 | 15 | 396 | 495 | –99 |

=== World Championship ===
Since their first appearance in 1975, the U.S. has participated in five World Championships.

| Year | Position | Pld | W | D | L | GS | GA | +/– |
|---|---|---|---|---|---|---|---|---|
| (Socialist Federal Republic of Yugoslavia) 1957 | did not qualify | | | | | | | |
| (Romania) 1962 | did not qualify | | | | | | | |
| (West Germany) 1965 | did not qualify | | | | | | | |
| (Netherlands) 1971 | did not qualify | | | | | | | |
| (Socialist Federal Republic of Yugoslavia) 1973 | did not qualify | | | | | | | |
| (Soviet Union) 1975 | 11th | 5 | 1 | 0 | 4 | 42 | 113 | −71 |
| (Czechoslovakia) 1978 | did not qualify | | | | | | | |
| (Hungary) 1982 | 11th | 8 | 1 | 0 | 7 | 99 | 173 | −74 |
| (Netherlands) 1986 | 16th | 6 | 0 | 0 | 6 | 84 | 139 | −55 |
| (South Korea) 1990 | did not qualify | | | | | | | |
| (Norway) 1993 | 12th | 7 | 0 | 0 | 7 | 117 | 189 | −72 |
| (Austria) (Hungary) 1995 | 17th | 5 | 1 | 0 | 4 | 95 | 121 | −26 |
| (Germany) 1997 | did not qualify | | | | | | | |
| (Norway) (Denmark) 1999 | did not qualify | | | | | | | |
| (Italy) 2001 | did not qualify | | | | | | | |
| (Croatia) 2003 | did not qualify | | | | | | | |
| (Russia) 2005 | did not qualify | | | | | | | |
| (France) 2007 | did not qualify | | | | | | | |
| (China) 2009 | did not qualify | | | | | | | |
| (Brazil) 2011 | did not qualify | | | | | | | |
| (Serbia) 2013 | did not qualify | | | | | | | |
| (Denmark) 2015 | did not qualify | | | | | | | |
| (Germany) 2017 | did not qualify | | | | | | | |
| (Japan) 2019 | did not qualify | | | | | | | |
| (Spain) 2021 | did not qualify | | | | | | | |
| (Denmark) (Norway) (Sweden) 2023 | did not qualify | | | | | | | |
| (Germany) (Netherlands) 2025 | Qualified as wild card, if they reach a certain performance level. | | | | | | | |
| (Hungary) 2027 | Qualified as wild card, if they reach a certain performance level. | | | | | | | |
| (Spain) 2029 | To be determined | | | | | | | |
| (Czech Republic) (Poland) 2031 | To be determined | | | | | | | |
| Total | 5/30 | 31 | 3 | 0 | 28 | 437 | 735 | –298 |

=== Pan American Championships ===
From their first appearance in 1986 to their last in 2017, the U.S. participated in eight Pan American Championships.

| Year | Position | Pld | W | D | L | GS | GA | +/– |
|---|---|---|---|---|---|---|---|---|
| (Brazil) 1986 | 1st | 4 | 4 | 0 | 0 | 62 | 22 | +40 |
| (United States) 1989 | 2nd | 3 | 2 | 1 | 0 | 71 | 38 | +33 |
| (Brazil) 1991 | 1st | 6 | 6 | 0 | 0 | 228 | 82 | +146 |
| (Brazil) 1997 | did not qualify | | | | | | | |
| (Argentina) 1999 | did not qualify | | | | | | | |
| (Brazil) 2000 | did not qualify | | | | | | | |
| (Brazil) 2003 | 4th | 5 | 2 | 0 | 3 | 91 | 104 | −13 |
| (Brazil) 2005 | 6th | 5 | 0 | 0 | 5 | 91 | 138 | −47 |
| (Dominican Republic) 2007 | 7th | 5 | 1 | 0 | 4 | 100 | 126 | −26 |
| (Chile) 2009 | did not qualify | | | | | | | |
| (Brazil) 2011 | did not qualify | | | | | | | |
| (Dominican Republic) 2013 | 8th | 6 | 1 | 0 | 5 | 120 | 180 | −60 |
| (Cuba) 2015 | 10th | 7 | 2 | 0 | 5 | 161 | 168 | −7 |
| (Argentina) 2017 | 5th | 6 | 3 | 0 | 3 | 145 | 163 | −18 |
| Total | 9/14 | 46 | 21 | 0 | 25 | 1069 | 1021 | +48 |

=== Pan American Games ===
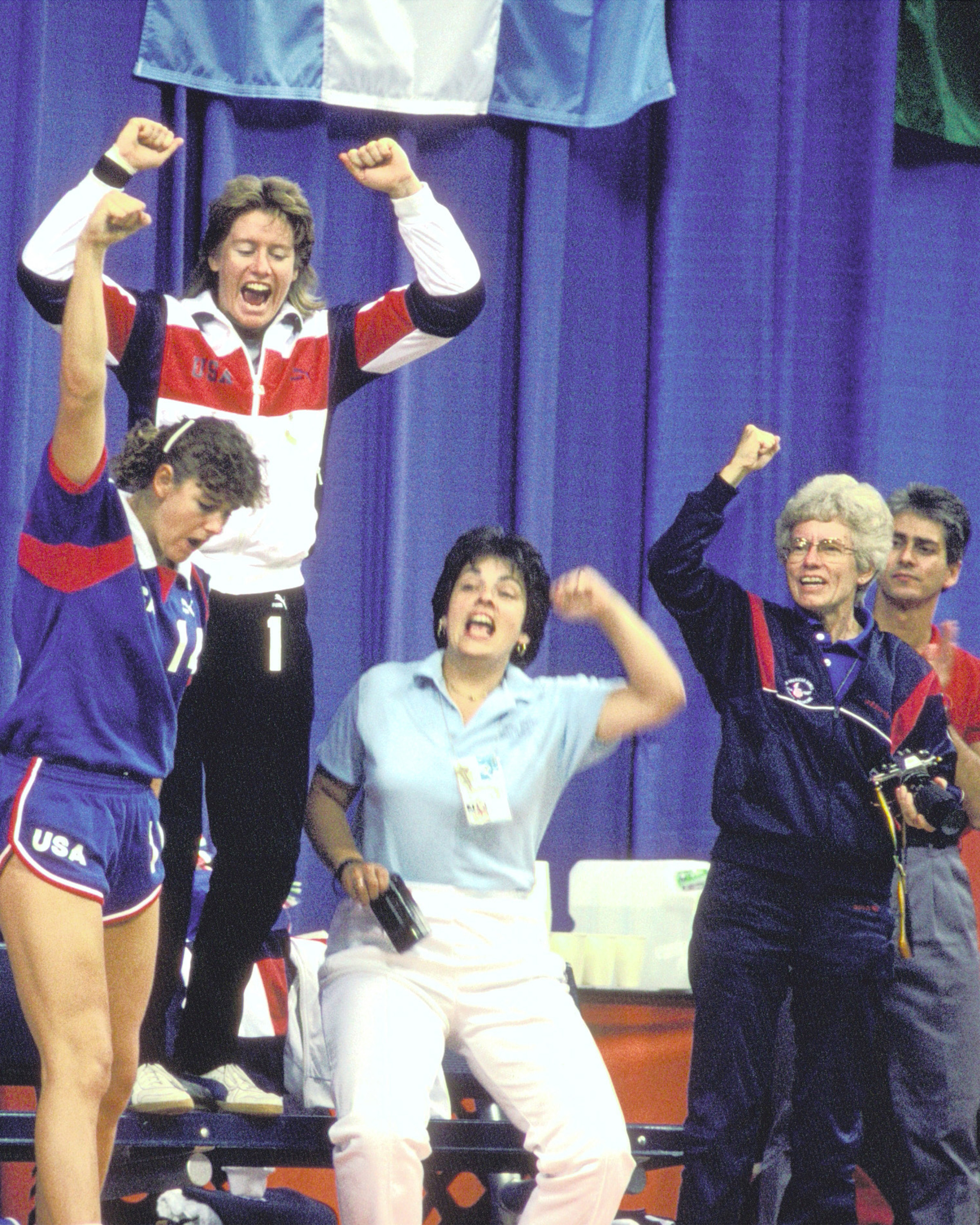
Kathy Callaghan stands on a bench and cheers as she and her teammates learn that they have clinched the gold medal at the 1987 Pan American Games.

Since their first appearance in 1987, the U.S. has participated in six Pan American Games.

| Year | Position | Pld | W | D | L | GS | GA | +/– |
|---|---|---|---|---|---|---|---|---|
| (United States) 1987 | 1st | 5 | 5 | 0 | 0 | 134 | 68 | +66 |
| (Argentina) 1995 | 1st | 5 | 5 | 0 | 0 | 122 | 98 | +24 |
| (Canada) 1999 | 4th | 7 | 2 | 1 | 4 | 154 | 155 | −1 |
| (Dominican Republic) 2003 | 4th | 7 | 3 | 0 | 4 | 156 | 187 | −31 |
| (Brazil) 2007 | did not qualify | | | | | | | |
| (Mexico) 2011 | 8th | 5 | 0 | 0 | 5 | 110 | 178 | −68 |
| (Canada) 2015 | did not qualify | | | | | | | |
| (Peru) 2019 | 4th | 5 | 2 | 0 | 3 | 102 | 117 | −15 |
| (Chile) 2023 | did not qualify | | | | | | | |
| Total | 6/9 | 34 | 17 | 1 | 16 | 778 | 803 | –25 |

=== Nor.Ca. Handball Championship ===
| Year | Position | Pld | W | D | L | GS | GA | +/– |
|---|---|---|---|---|---|---|---|---|
| (Puerto Rico) 2015 | 3rd | 6 | 3 | 1 | 2 | 151 | 165 | –14 |
| (Puerto Rico) 2017 | 2nd | 5 | 4 | 0 | 1 | 122 | 112 | +10 |
| (Mexico) 2019 | 5th | 4 | 2 | 1 | 1 | 118 | 97 | +21 |
| (United States) 2021 | 4th | 4 | 0 | 0 | 4 | 73 | 109 | –36 |
| (Greenland) 2023 | 5th | 4 | 0 | 0 | 4 | 57 | 119 | –62 |
| (Mexico) 2025 | 4th | 5 | 1 | 0 | 4 | 103 | 129 | –26 |
| Total | 6/6 | 28 | 10 | 2 | 16 | 624 | 731 | –107 |

== See also ==
- Handball in the United States
- United States men's national handball team
