= Bruno Souza (handballer) =

Brazilian handball player (born 1977)

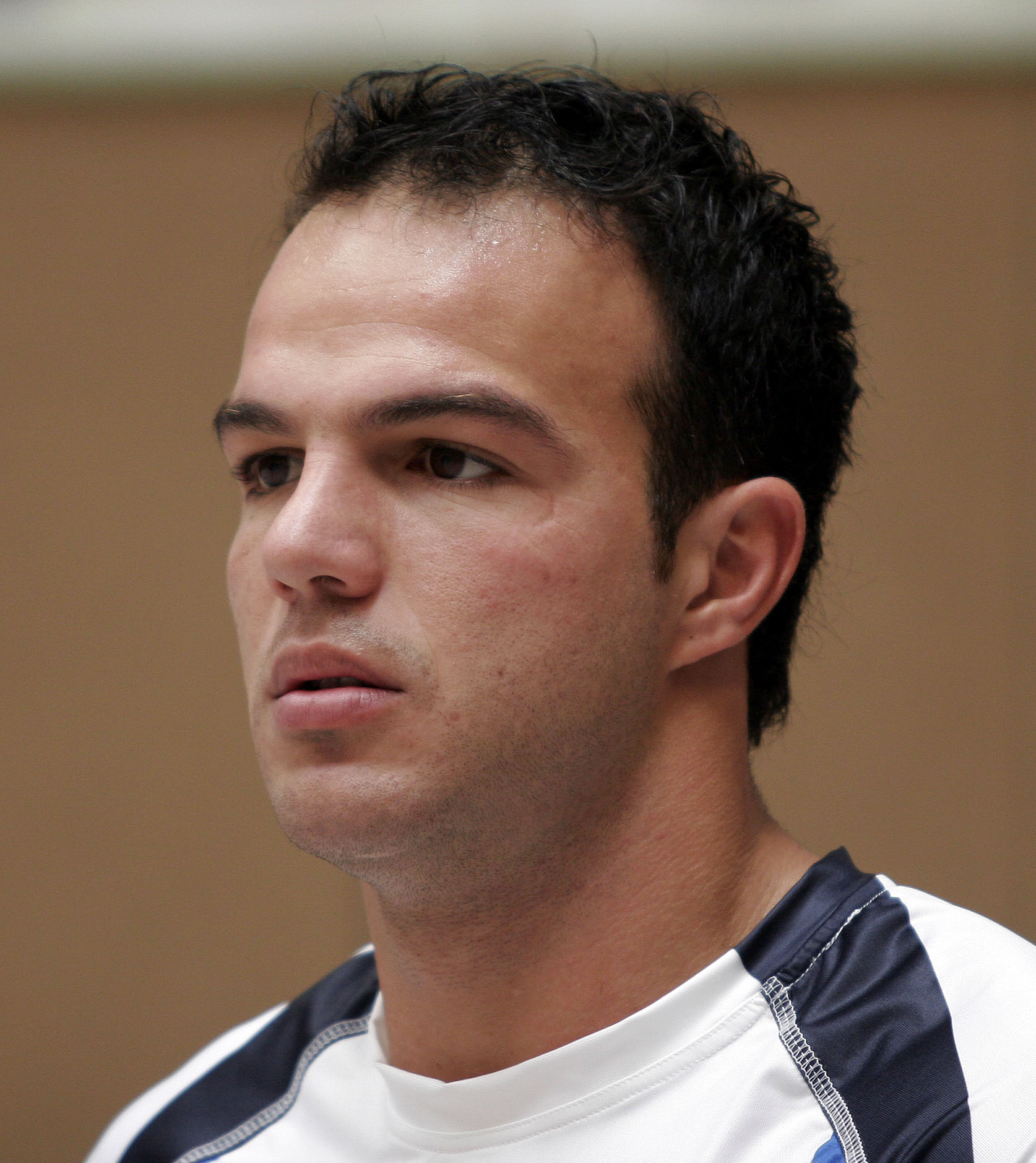

Personal information
- Full name: Bruno Bezerra de Menezes Souza
- Nationality: Brazilian
- Born: 24 June 1977 (age 49) Rio de Janeiro
- Height: 191 cm (75 in)

Sport
- Sport: Handball
- Position: Left back
- Current club: Retired

Senior clubs
- Years: Team
- –: Niterói Rugby
- –: Vasco da Gama
- -1999: Metodista São Bernardo
- 1999-2006: Frisch Auf Göppingen
- 2006-2008: HSV Hamburg
- 2008-2009: BM Alcobendas
- 2009-2011: HBC Nantes
National team
Years	Team	Apps	(Gls)
–	Brazil	196	(623)
Medal record
Pan American Games
Silver medal – second place	1999 Winnipeg	Team
Gold medal – first place	2003 Santo Domingo	Team
Gold medal – first place	2007 Rio de Janeiro	Team
- Updated on 23 December 2013

Bruno Souza (born 24 June 1977) is a Brazilian former handball player who played for the Brazilian national team. He was born in Rio de Janeiro. He participated in the 2004 Summer Olympics, where Brazil placed 10th, and in the 2008 Summer Olympics, where the Brazilian team placed 11th.
