= Hélio Justino =

Brazilian handball player (born 1972)

Helinho
Personal information
- Full name: Hélio Lisboa Justino
- Born: 23 July 1972 (age 54) Aracajú, Sergipe, Brazil
- Height: 1.84 m (6 ft 0 in)

Sport
- Sport: Handball
Medal record
Men's handball
Representing Brazil
Pan American Games
Silver medal – second place	1999 Winnipeg	Team
Gold medal – first place	2003 Santo Domingo	Team
Gold medal – first place	2007 Rio de Janeiro	Team

Hélio Lisboa Justino (born 23 July 1972), known as Helinho, is a Brazilian handball player who competed in the 2004 Summer Olympics and in the 2008 Summer Olympics.

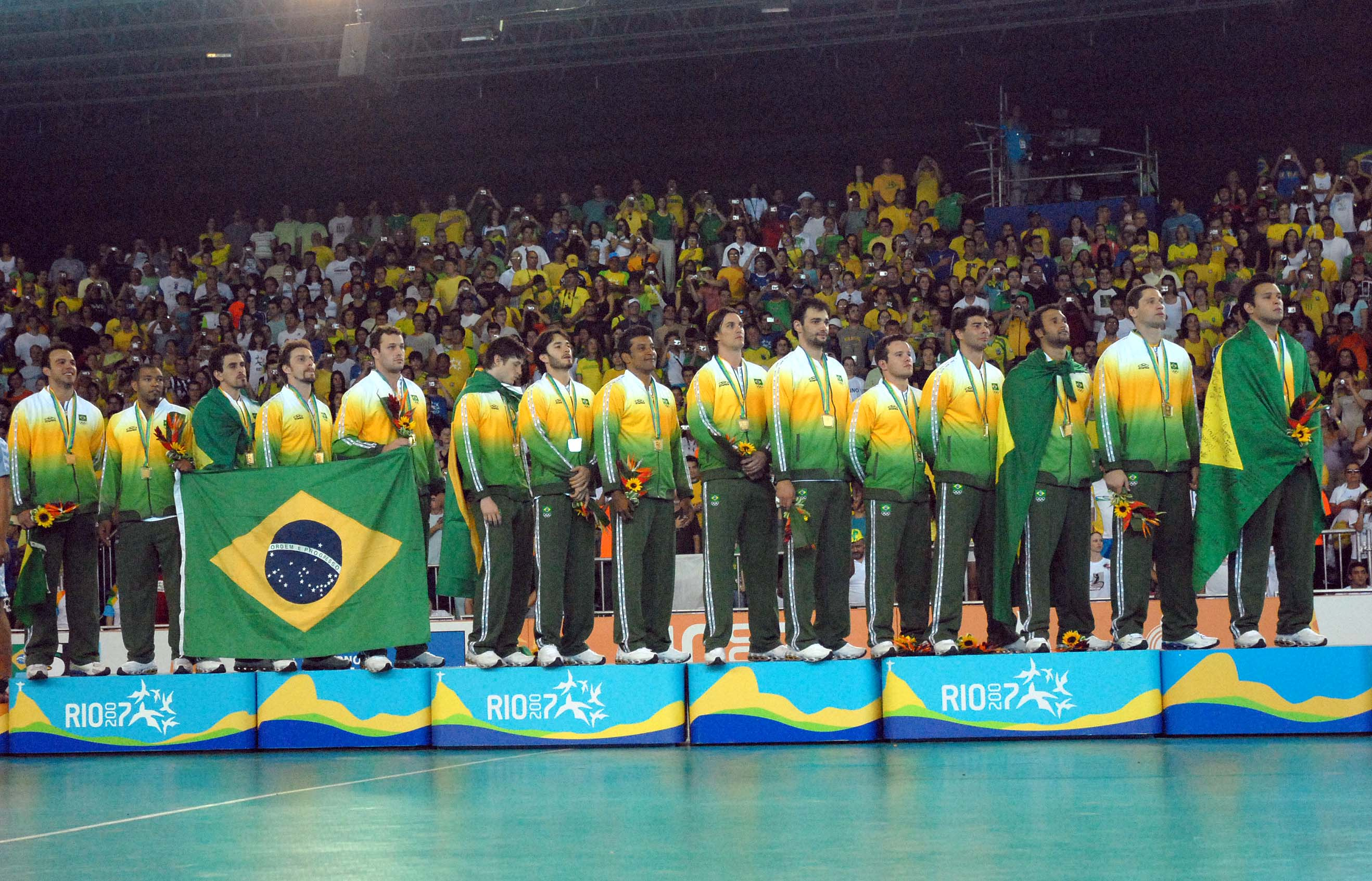
Brazilian men's team on podium after winning gold at 2007 Pan American Games.
