= Jair Henrique Alves Junior =

Brazilian handball player (born 1978)

Jair
Personal information
- Full name: Jair Henrique Alves Júnior
- Born: 1 October 1978 (age 48) Maringá, Brazil
- Height: 1.82 m (6 ft 0 in)

Sport
- Sport: Handball
Medal record
Men's handball
Representing Brazil
Pan American Games
Gold medal – first place	2003 Santo Domingo	Team

Jair Henrique Alves Júnior (born 1 October 1978), known as Jair, is a Brazilian handball player. He competed in the men's tournament at the 2004 Summer Olympics.
