= Jaqson Kojoroski =

Brazilian handball player (born 1979)

Jaqson
Personal information
- Full name: Jaqson Luiz Kojoroski
- Born: 3 January 1979 (age 47) Descanso, Brazil
- Height: 1.92 m (6 ft 4 in)

Sport
- Sport: Handball
Medal record
Men's handball
Representing Brazil
Pan American Games
Gold medal – first place	2003 Santo Domingo	Team
Gold medal – first place	2007 Rio de Janeiro	Team
Silver medal – second place	2011 Guadalajara	Team

Jaqson Luiz Kojoroski (born 3 January 1979), known as Jaqson, is a Brazilian handball player. He competed in the men's tournament at the 2004 Summer Olympics.
