= Choi Seung-wook =

South Korean handball player (born 1976)

- Hangul: 최승욱
- RR: Choe Seunguk
- MR: Ch'oe Sŭnguk

Choi Seung-wook (born 13 March 1976) is a South Korean handball player who competed in the 2004 Summer Olympics.
