= Daniel Baldacin =

Brazilian handball player (born 1977)

Baldacin
Personal information
- Full name: Daniel Baldacin
- Born: 6 May 1977 (age 49) São Paulo, Brazil
- Height: 1.90 m (6 ft 3 in)

Sport
- Sport: Handball
Medal record
Representing Brazil
Men's handball
Pan American Games
| Gold medal – first place | 2003 Santo Domingo | Team |
Men's beach handball
World Championships
| Gold medal – first place | 2006 Rio de Janeiro | Team |
| Silver medal – second place | 2008 Cadiz | Team |
| Gold medal – first place | 2010 Antalya | Team |
World Games
| Gold medal – first place | 2009 Kaohsiung | Team |

Daniel Baldacin (born 6 May 1977), known as Baldacin, is a Brazilian handball player. He competed in the men's tournament at the 2004 Summer Olympics.
