= Dušan Podpečan =

Slovenian handball player

Dušan Podpečan (born 12 October 1975 in Celje) is a Slovenian handball player who competed in the 2004 Summer Olympics.
