= Aleksandr Tuchkin =

Russian handball player

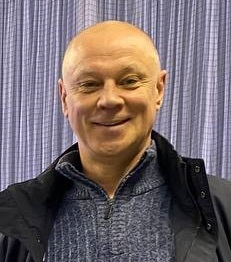

Personal information
- Full name: Aleksandr Arkadyevich Tuchkin
- Born: 15 July 1964 (age 62) Lviv, Ukrainian SSR, Soviet Union
- Height: 203 cm (80 in)

Sport
- Sport: Handball
- Position: Right back

Senior clubs
- Years: Team
- 1984-1990: SKA Minsk
- 1990-1998: TUSEM Essen
- 1998-2000: GWD Minden
- 2000: Eintracht Hildesheim
- 2000-2002: Teka Cantabria
- 2002-2004: AC Filippos Verias
- 2004-2005: TSV Hannover-Burgdorf
- 2006: Wilhelmshavener HV
National team
Years	Team		
1986-1992	Soviet Union		
1992-1995	Belarus	10	(48)
1998-2004	Russia	92	(299)
Medal record
Men's handball
Representing Soviet Union
Olympic Games
Gold medal – first place	1988 Seoul	Team
World Championships
Silver medal – second place	1990 Czechoslovakia	Team
Representing Russia
Olympic Games
Gold medal – first place	2000 Sydney	Team
Bronze medal – third place	2004 Athens	Team
World Championships
Silver medal – second place	1999 Egypt	Team
European Championships
Silver medal – second place	2000 Croatia	Team

Aleksandr Arkadyevich Tuchkin (born 15 July 1964) is a Russian/Belarusian team handball player and Olympic champion from 2000 in Sydney and 1988 in Seoul. He received a bronze medal at the 2004 Summer Olympics in Athens with the Russian national team.

== Club career ==
=== Soviet Union ===
Tuchkin started his career at SKA Minsk, where he made his senior debut aged 20. Here he won the 1987, 1989 and 1990 European Champions Cup and the 1988 EHF Cup Winners' Cup, as well as the Soviet Championship four times in a row from 1986 to 1989.

=== Germany ===
After the Fall of the Berlin Wall he moved to Germany and joined TUSEM Essen. Here he won the DHB-Pokal in 1991 and 1992 and the EHF City Cup in 1994.

In 1998 he joined GWD Minden. Due to being involved in a car crash under the influence of alcohol, he was told he would not have his contract extended in September 1999. He was then out of contract for a year before joining Eintracht Hildesheim in 2000.

=== Spain ===
6 months later he joined Spanish club CB Cantabria Santander.

=== Greece ===
In 2002 he joined the Greek side AC Filippos Verias where he won the Greek championship in 2003 and reached the final of the EHF Challenge Cup, losing to Danish side Skjern Håndbold.

=== Back to Germany ===
In 2004 he returned to Germany and joined Regionalliga side TSV Hannover-Burgdorf. With them he was promoted to the 2nd Bundesliga and retired afterwards.

In the spring of 2006 he made a short comeback for Wilhelmshavener HV.

== National team ==
=== Soviet Union ===
Tuchkin played with the Soviet Union junior national team from 1985, and made his debut for the Senior team the following year. He participated in the Soviet team that won gold medals at the 1988 Summer Olympics in Seoul.

Two years later he won silver medals at the 1990 World Championship, losing to Sweden in the final. With 55 goals Tuchkin was the top scorer at the tournament, together with Cuban Julián Duranona.

He missed the 1992 Olympics due to injury.

=== Belarus ===
After the Dissolution of the Soviet Union he played for a short while for the Belarusian national team. He represented them at the 1995 World Championship, where they finished 9th. In total he played only 10 games for Belarus.

=== Russia ===
After being asked by his friend Andrey Lavrov he played from 1998 for the Russian national team. His first major international tournament was the 1999 World Championship, where Russia won silver medals, once again losing to Sweden.

At the 2000 European Championship he once again won silver medals, losing the Sweden in the final.

At the 2000 Olympics he finally won gold medals with Russia.

At the age of 40 he represented Russia once again at the 2004 Olympics, winning bronze medals.

== Post-playing career ==
After his playing days Tuchkin has worked in the Russian Ministry of Sports together with Andrey Lavrov to promote handball in Russia.
