= Matthew Ryan (handballer) =

American handball player

Matt Ryan
Personal information
- Full name: Matthew Colin Ryan
- Nationality: United States
- Born: February 19, 1966 (age 60) Miller Place, New York, U.S.
- Height: 193 cm (6 ft 4 in)

Sport
- Sport: Handball
- Position: backcourt and circle

Senior clubs
- Years: Team
- 1988 – 1996: Garden City
- 1996 – Min. 2002: Condor Handball
National team
Years	Team	Apps
1989–96	United States	225
Title
- 1999 – 2000: Nationals
- Basketball career

Career information
- College: University of Massachusetts Amherst; Long Island University
Medals
Men's handball
Representing the United States
Pan American Games
Bronze medal – third place	1991 Havana	Team

Matthew Colin "Matt" Ryan (born February 19, 1966), a native of New York, was captain of the 1996 US Olympic handball team. He was a member of the US National team from 1989-1996 and he competed at the Goodwill Games in 1994 where the US team ranked 6 of 6. He played basketball for the University of Massachusetts Amherst and Long Island University.

== Awards ==
- 1 x Suffolk Sports Hall of Fame
- 3 x USA Player of the Year
