= Marko Oštir =

Slovenian handball player

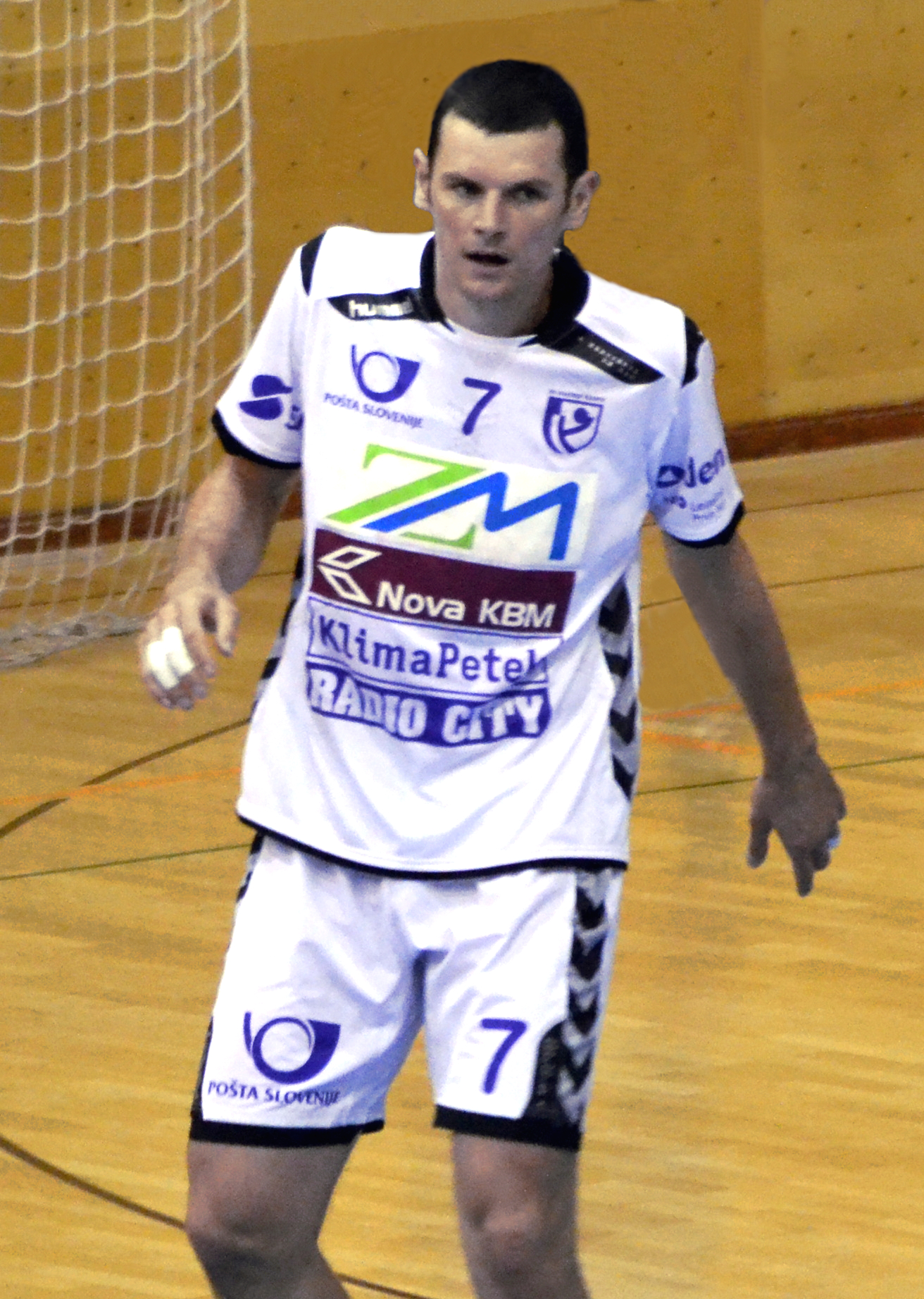
Marko Oštir

Marko Oštir (born 7 June 1977 in Slovenj Gradec) is a retired professional handball player.

== Information ==
Height: 1.94 m (6 ft 4 1/2 in)
Weight: 100 kg (220 lb)
Position: line player
