= Claudio Vieira de Oliveira =

Brazilian accountant, author and orator

- Born: 1976 (age 49–50); Monte Santo, Bahia, Brazil
- Other name: Claudinho
- Education: State University of Feira de Santana
- Occupations: Accountant; motivational speaker
- Years active: 2000–present

Claudio Vieira de Oliveira, also known as Claudio Oliveira, (born 1976) is a Brazilian motivational speaker and accountant born with arthrogryposis multiplex congenita, a rare syndrome which affects the muscular system.

== Biography ==
Claudio was born with a complicated body structure due to the arthrogryposis syndrome. He was born with his head positioned upside down and with severely deformed limbs. He was also born with muscular atrophy in his leg muscles, arms stuck to his chest and his head turned all the way back.

The doctors initially expected that he might not be able to survive beyond 24 hours soon after his birth and they even advised his mother to let him starve to death. However, his mother ignored the doctors' advice, instead raising him alone. Claudio was carried by his mother until the age of seven and he started to walk on his knees at the age of eight. It was also reported that his parents had renovated the house keeping his disability in mind.

He currently lives in the small municipality of Monte Santo, Bahia which is situated in the Northeast Region, Brazil. In March 2021, it was revealed that he had been under self-quarantine for over a year due to COVID-19 concerns.

== Career ==
He became a professional qualified accountant after graduating from the State University of Feira de Santana. He began his career as an accountant by engaging in research and consulting clients despite his disability. Claudio also became a motivational speaker in 2000 and has travelled to various countries to deliver motivational speeches. In 2016, he wrote and published his autobiography, titled El mundo esta a contramano (The World is the wrong way around). The book was launched at the São Paulo Museum of Art in Southeast Brazil.

== See also ==
- Nick Vujicic, an Australian-American evangelist, motivational speaker and survivor of tetra-amelia syndrome
- Hirotada Ototake, a Japanese sports writer and survivor of tetra-amelia syndrome
- Joanne O'Riordan, an Irish tetra-amelia syndrome survivor
- Jennifer Bricker, an American acrobat born without legs
