= Gilberto Cardoso =

Brazilian handball player (born 1968)

Personal information
- Born: 11 February 1968 (age 57); Taguatinga, Brazil

Sport
- Sport: Handball

Gilberto Cardoso (born 11 February 1968) is a Brazilian former handball player. He competed in the men's tournament at the 1992 Summer Olympics.
