= Dominican Republic men's national handball team =

Dominican Republic

Information
- Association: Dominican Republic Handball Federation
- Coach: Tony Bustos

Colours
1st	2nd

Results

Pan American Championship
- Appearances: 2 (First in 2000)
- Best result: 6th (2000)
- Last updated on Unknown.

The Dominican Republic national handball team is the national handball team of Dominican Republic and is governed by the Dominican Republic Handball Federation.

The team won the 2009 Pan-American Men’s First Division Championship, held in home soil Santo Domingo.

== Tournament record ==
=== Pan American Championship ===
Year	Round	Position	GP	W	D*	L	GS	GA
(Brazil) 2000	5th place game	6th	5	2	0	3	130	172
(Chile) 2010	7th place game	8th	5	0	0	5	98	155

=== Pan American Games ===
Games	Round	Position	Pld	W	D	L	GF	GA	GD
(Canada) 2015 Toronto	7th place game	8th	5	0	0	5	123	176	-53

=== Central American and Caribbean Games ===
Games	Round	Position	Pld	W	D	L	GF	GA	GD
(Colombia) 2018 Barranquilla	Bronze medal game	4th	5	2	0	3	162	141	21

=== Caribbean Handball Cup ===
- 2013 – 1st

Year	Round	Position	GP	W	D*	L	GS	GA
(Colombia) 2017	bronze medal game	3	6	1	3	2	164	166

=== Nor.Ca Championship ===
Year	Round	Position	GP	W	D*	L	GS	GA
(Mexico) 2018	Round robin	6	5	0	1	4	124	156
