= Freddy Suárez (handballer) =

Cuban handball player (born 1971)

Personal information
- Nationality: Cuban
- Born: 20 October 1971 (age 55)

Sport
- Sport: Handball

Freddy Suárez (born 20 October 1971) is a Cuban handball player. He competed in the men's tournament at the 2000 Summer Olympics.
