= Fausto Steinwandter =

Brazilian handball player (born 1967)

Personal information
- Born: 16 January 1967 (age 58); Caçador, Brazil

Sport
- Sport: Handball

Fausto Steinwandter (born 16 January 1967) is a Brazilian handball player. He competed in the men's tournament at the 1996 Summer Olympics.
