= United States men's national handball team =

United States

Information
- Association: USA Team Handball
- Coach: Mark Ortega
- Assistant coach: Darrick Heath; Julio Saínz

Colours
1st	2nd

Results

Summer Olympics
- Appearances: 6 (First in 1936)
- Best result: 6th place (1936)

World Championship
- Appearances: 8 (First in 1964)
- Best result: 15th place (1964)

Pan American Championship
- Appearances: 15 (First in 1980)
- Best result: (silver) 2nd (1983, 1985)
- Last updated on Unknown.

The United States national handball team is controlled by USA Team Handball. Due to disputes over funding, general lack of fiscal discipline, and accusations of incompetence, on February 14, 2006, the USOC revoked the governing duties of handball from the United States Team Handball Federation but has since selected USA Team Handball as the new United States National Governing Body.

== Tournament record ==
=== Olympic Games ===
Since their first appearance in 1936, USA has participated in six Olympic Games.

Year	Position	Pld	W	D	L	GS	GA	+/–
(Nazi Germany) 1936	6th	2	0	0	2	3	36	–33
(West Germany) 1972	14th	5	1	0	4	86	112	–26
(Canada) 1976	10th	5	0	0	5	100	149	–49
(Soviet Union) 1980	did not qualify							
(United States) 1984	9th	6	1	1	4	115	116	–1
(South Korea) 1988	12th	6	0	0	6	102	149	–47
(Spain) 1992	did not qualify							
(United States) 1996	9th	6	2	0	4	138	168	–30
(Australia) 2000	did not qualify							
(Greece) 2004	did not qualify							
(China) 2008	did not qualify							
(United Kingdom) 2012	did not qualify							
(Brazil) 2016	did not qualify							
(Japan) 2020	did not qualify							
(France) 2024	did not qualify							
(United States) 2028	qualified as host							
Total	7/16	30	4	1	25	544	730	–186

=== World Championship ===
Since their first appearance in 1964, USA has participated in eight World Championships.

Year	Position	Pld	W	D	L	GS	GA	+/–
(Nazi Germany) 1938	did not qualify							
(Sweden) 1954	did not qualify							
(East Germany) 1958	did not qualify							
(West Germany) 1961	did not qualify							
(Czechoslovakia) 1964	16th	3	0	0	3	25	66	–41
(Sweden) 1967	did not qualify							
(France) 1970	16th	3	0	0	3	32	78	–46
(East Germany) 1974	16th	3	0	0	3	43	104	–61
(Denmark) 1978	did not qualify							
(West Germany) 1982	did not qualify							
(Switzerland) 1986	did not qualify							
(Czechoslovakia) 1990	did not qualify							
(Sweden) 1993	16th	6	0	0	6	115	206	–91
(Iceland) 1995	21st	5	0	0	5	82	135	–53
(Japan) 1997	did not qualify							
(Egypt) 1999	did not qualify							
(France) 2001	24th	5	0	0	5	80	189	–109
(Portugal) 2003	did not qualify							
(Tunisia) 2005	did not qualify							
(Germany) 2007	did not qualify							
(Croatia) 2009	did not qualify							
(Sweden) 2011	did not qualify							
(Spain) 2013	did not qualify							
(Qatar) 2015	did not qualify							
(France) 2017	did not qualify							
(Denmark) 2019	did not qualify							
(Egypt) 2021	withdrawn							
(Poland) (Sweden) 2023	20th	6	2	0	4	141	189	–48
(Croatia) (Denmark) (Norway) 2025	26th	7	3	1*	3	168	197	–29
(Germany) 2027	Qualified							
(France) (Germany) 2029	To be determined							
(Denmark) (Iceland) (Norway) 2031	To be determined							
Total	9/32	38	5	1*	32	686	1164	–478

*Denotes draws include knockout matches decided in a penalty shootout.

=== Pan American Championship ===
Since their first appearance in 1980, USA has participated in 14 Pan American Championships.

Year	Position	Pld	W	D	L	GS	GA	+/–
(Mexico) 1980	3rd	5	3	0	2	115	95	+20
(Argentina) 1981	3rd	5	3	0	2	86	80	+6
(United States) 1983	2nd	5	4	1	0	136	73	+63
(Brazil) 1985	2nd	5	4	0	1	65	43	+22
(Cuba) 1989	3rd	5	3	0	2	110	97	+13
(Brazil) 1994	3rd	6	4	0	2	47	68	−21
(United States) 1996	3rd	5	4	0	1	112	93	+19
(Cuba) 1998	4th	6	3	0	3	130	131	−1
(Brazil) 2000	4th	5	2	0	3	98	146	−48
(Argentina) 2002	4th	5	2	0	3	105	119	−14
(Chile) 2004	7th	5	1	0	4	117	142	−25
(Brazil) 2006	4th	5	1	1	3	121	160	−39
(Brazil) 2008	did not qualify							
(Chile) 2010	did not qualify							
(Argentina) 2012	7th	5	2	0	3	135	149	−14
(Uruguay) 2014	6th	5	2	0	3	147	154	−7
(Argentina) 2016	8th	7	2	0	5	179	211	−32
(Greenland) 2018	did not qualify							
Total	15/18	79	40	2	37	1703	1761	−58

=== Pan American Games ===
Year	Position	Pld	W	D	L	GS	GA	+/–
(United States) 1987	1st	5	5	0	0	138	107	+31
(Cuba) 1991	3rd	5	3	0	2	108	112	–4
(Argentina) 1995	4th	6	2	0	4	118	111	+7
(Canada) 1999	4th	5	2	0	3	103	122	–19
(Dominican Republic) 2003	3rd	5	3	0	2	120	131	–11
(Brazil) 2007	did not qualify							
(Mexico) 2011	7th	5	1	0	4	137	157	–20
(Canada) 2015	did not qualify							
(Peru) 2019	6th	5	2	0	3	123	145	–22
(Chile) 2023	4th	5	2	0	3	132	154	–22
Total	8/10	41	20	0	21	979	1039	–60

=== Nor.Ca. Championship ===
Year	Position	Pld	W	D	L	GS	GA	+/–
(Mexico) 2014	3rd	4	2	0	2	100	97	+3
(Mexico) 2018	5th	5	1	1	3	151	164	−13
(Mexico) 2022	1st	4	4	0	0	131	113	+18
(Mexico) 2024	4th	6	3	0	3	178	179	−1
(United States) 2026	1st	4	4	0	0	132	86	+46
Total	5/5	23	14	1	8	692	639	+53

=== IHF Emerging Nations Championship ===
- 2019 – 5th place
- 2025 – 3rd place

== Current squad ==
The squad for the 2025 World Men's Handball Championship.

Head coach: (Sweden) Robert Hedin

No.	Pos.	Name	Date of birth (age)	Height	App.	Goals	Club
1	GK	Pál Merkovszky	5 May 2000 (age 26)	1.95 m	10	1	(Hungary) Budai Farkasok KKUK
3	RW	Sean Corning	27 November 1996 (age 29)	1.81 m	8	8	(Spain) CB Málaga
4	CB	Benjamin Edwards	1 September 2006 (aged 18)	1.88 m	12	72	(Hungary) Veszprém Handball Academy
6	RB	Jonas Strömberg	27 August 2001 (age 24)	1.91 m	12	20	(Sweden) Lugi HF
7	CB	Alex Chan	26 April 1993 (age 33)	1.88 m	10	40	(Spain) Club Cisne de Balonmano
8	P	Paul Skorupa	7 September 1999 (age 26)	1.93 m	14	0	(Germany) VfL Lübeck-Schwartau
9	LB	Gary Hines	21 March 1984 (age 42)	1.80 m	81	709	(Germany) SG Langenfeld
10	CB	Daniel Hunyadi	20 November 2003 (age 22)	1.92 m	0	0	(Hungary) Ferencvárosi TC
11	LB	Aboubakar Fofana	26 July 1996 (age 30)	1.98 m	110	137	(France) Villeurbanne Handball
14	CB	Ian Hueter	22 October 1997 (age 28)	1.96 m	32	80	(Germany) TSV Bayer Dormagen
15	LW	Lukas Karlskov Hansen	14 June 2002 (age 24)	1.87 m	0	0	(Denmark) HØJ Elite
16	GK	Douglas Otterström	16 May 2001 (age 25)	1.85 m	2	0	(Sweden) Tyresö Handboll
17	P	Andrew Donlin	9 October 1992 (age 33)	2.02 m	40	65	(United States) San Francisco CalHeat
20	RW	Rodrigo Campos	7 October 2004 (age 21)	1.90 m	6	20	(Spain) Balonmano Cuatro Valles
25	P	Patrick Hueter (c)	24 July 1995 (age 31)	1.96 m	18	60	(Germany) TSV Bayer Dormagen
31	RB	Tristan Morawski	12 March 2005 (age 21)	2.02 m	10	0	(Poland) Sandra SPA Pogoń Szczecin
33	LW	Samuel Hoddersen	10 June 1997 (age 29)	1.83 m	35	48	(Germany) HSG Rodgau Nieder-Roden
34	P	Domagoj Sršen	31 December 1990 (age 35)	2.02 m	16	3	(Croatia) RK Metković

== See also ==
- Handball in the United States
- United States women's national handball team
