= Handball at the 1987 Pan American Games =

The Handball Tournament at the 1987 Pan American Games was held from August 9 to August 17, 1987 in Indianapolis, United States at the Hoosier Dome. The sport made its debut at the Pan Am Games with two tournaments, one for the men (from August 9 to August 17) and one for the women (from August 10 to August 16).

== Men's tournament ==
=== Final ranking ===
RANK	TEAM
1.	United States
2.	Cuba
3.	Brazil
4.	Canada
5.	Argentina

United States are qualified for the 1988 Summer Olympics in Seoul, South Korea. Cuba is qualified for the 1989 Men's Handball World Championship for B-nations in France.

=== Awards ===
1987 Pan American Games winners

United States
First title

== Women's tournament ==
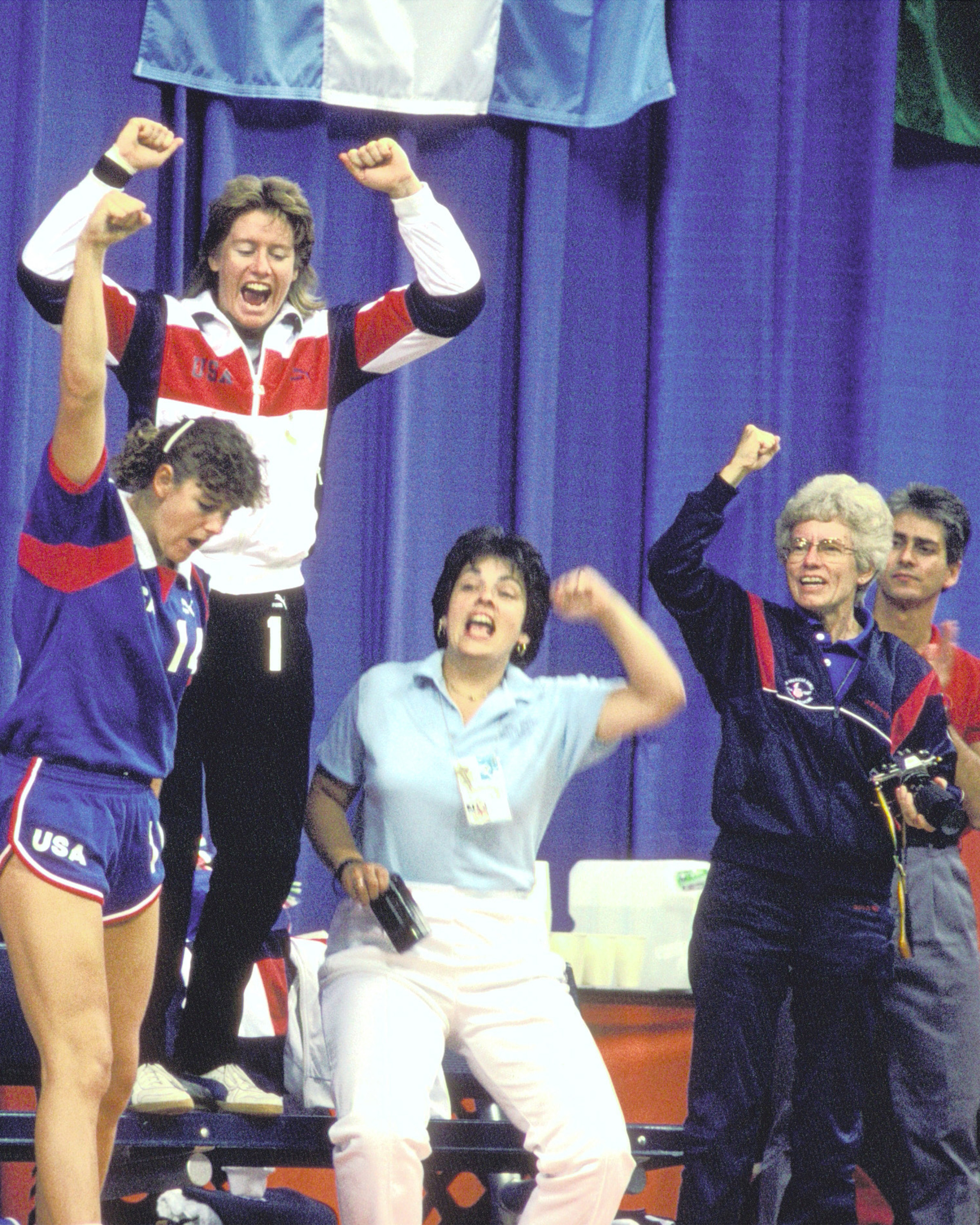
Kathy Callaghan stands on a bench and cheers as she and her teammates learn that they have clinched the gold medal.

=== Final ranking ===
RANK	TEAM
1.	United States
2.	Canada
3.	Brazil
4.	Cuba
5.	Argentina

United States are qualified for the 1988 Summer Olympics in Seoul, South Korea. Canada and Brazil are qualified for the 1987 Women's Handball World Championship for B-nations in Bulgaria.

=== Awards ===
1987 Pan American Games winners

United States
First title

== Medal table ==
Place	Nation	Gold medal	Silver medal	Bronze medal	Total
1	United States	2	0	0	2
2	Canada	0	1	0	1
	Cuba	0	1	0	1
4	Brazil	0	0	2	2
Total		2	2	2	6

== See also ==
- List of Pan American Games medalists in handball (men)
