= Handball at the 1999 Pan American Games =

The Men's Handball Tournament at the 1999 Pan American Games was held from July 31 to August 7, 1999 in Winnipeg, Manitoba, Canada. The women competed from July 31 to August 8.

== Men's tournament ==
=== Final ranking ===
RANK	TEAM
1.	Cuba
2.	Brazil
3.	Argentina
4.	United States
5.	Canada
6.	Uruguay
7.	Puerto Rico

=== Awards ===
1999 Pan American Games winners

Cuba
Third title

== Women's tournament ==
=== Final ranking ===
RANK	TEAM
1.	Brazil
2.	Canada
3.	Cuba
4.	United States
5.	Uruguay
6.	Argentina

=== Awards ===
1999 Pan American Games winners

Brazil
First title

== Medal table ==
Place	Nation	Gold medal	Silver medal	Bronze medal	Total
1	Brazil	1	1	0	2
2	Cuba	1	0	1	2
3	Canada	0	1	0	1
4	Argentina	0	0	1	1
Total		2	2	2	6

== See also ==
- List of Pan American Games medalists in handball (men)
