= Handball at the 1995 Pan American Games =

The Men's Handball Tournament at the 1995 Pan American Games was held from March 16 to March 25, 1995 in Mar del Plata, Argentina. The women competed from March 15 to March 24.

== Men's tournament ==
=== Final ranking ===
RANK	TEAM
1.	Cuba
2.	Brazil
3.	Argentina
4.	United States
5.	Paraguay
6.	Puerto Rico

=== Awards ===
1995 Pan American Games winners

Cuba
Second title

== Women's tournament ==
=== Final ranking ===
RANK	TEAM
1.	United States
2.	Canada
3.	Brazil
4.	Cuba
5.	Argentina

=== Awards ===
1995 Pan American Games winners

United States
Second title

== Medal table ==
Place	Nation	Gold medal	Silver medal	Bronze medal	Total
1	Cuba	1	0	0	1
	United States	1	0	0	1
3	Brazil	0	1	1	2
4	Canada	0	1	0	1
5	Argentina	0	0	1	1
Total		2	2	2	6

== See also ==
- List of Pan American Games medalists in handball (men)
