= Handball at the Pan American Games =

- No. of events: 2 (men: 1; women: 1)

Handball at the Pan American Games began at the 1987 edition in Indianapolis, United States for both men and women.Due a lack of teams, the 1991 edition of the Pan American Games, however, held only a men's handball competition.

Argentina are the current men's champion, winning their second consecutive (and third overall) gold at the 2023 edition. Meanwhile, Brazil has won the last seven editions of the women's tournament.

== Men's competition ==
Year	Host	Gold	Silver	Bronze	Fourth place
1987; Details	Indianapolis, United States	United States	Cuba	Brazil	Canada
1991; Details	Havana, Cuba	Cuba	Brazil	United States	Canada
1995; Details	Mar del Plata, Argentina	Cuba	Brazil	Argentina	United States
1999; Details	Winnipeg, Canada	Cuba	Brazil	Argentina	United States
2003; Details	Santo Domingo, Dominican Republic	Brazil	Argentina	United States	Uruguay
2007; Details	Rio de Janeiro, Brazil	Brazil	Argentina	Cuba	Uruguay
2011; Details	Guadalajara, Mexico	Argentina	Brazil	Chile	Dominican Republic
2015; Details	Toronto, Canada	Brazil	Argentina	Chile	Uruguay
2019; Details	Lima, Peru	Argentina	Chile	Brazil	Mexico
2023; Details	Santiago, Chile	Argentina	Brazil	Chile	United States
2027; Details	Lima, Peru				

=== Medal table (men) ===
Rank	Nation	Gold	Silver	Bronze	Total
1	Brazil	3	5	2	10
2	Argentina	3	3	2	8
3	Cuba	3	1	1	5
4	United States	1	0	2	3
5	Chile	0	1	3	4
Totals (5 entries)		10	10	10	30

=== Participation history (men) ===
Nation	(United States) 1987	(Cuba) 1991	(Argentina) 1995	(Canada) 1999	(Dominican Republic) 2003	(Brazil) 2007	(Mexico) 2011	(Canada) 2015	(Peru) 2019	(Chile) 2023	Years
Argentina	5th	5th	3rd	3rd	2nd	2nd	1st	2nd	1st	1st	10
Brazil	3rd	2nd	2nd	2nd	1st	1st	2nd	1st	3rd	2nd	10
Canada	4th	4th	-	5th	-	7th	5th	7th	-	-	6
Chile	-	-	-	-	5th	5th	3rd	3rd	2nd	3rd	6
Cuba	2nd	1st	1st	1st	-	3rd	-	6th	5th	6th	8
Dominican Republic	-	-	-	-	7th	6th	4th	8th	-	8th	5
Mexico	-	-	-	-	8th	8th	6th	-	4th	7th	5
Paraguay	-	-	5th	-	-	-	-	-	-	-	1
Peru	-	-	-	-	-	-	-	-	8th	-	1
Puerto Rico	-	-	6th	7th	6th	-	-	5th	7th	-	5
United States	1st	3rd	4th	4th	3rd	-	7th	-	6th	4th	8
Uruguay	-	-	-	6th	4th	4th	-	4th	-	5th	5
Venezuela	-	-	-	-	-	-	8th	-	-	-	1
Total	5	5	6	7	8	8	8	8	8	8	

== Women's competition ==
Year	Host	Gold	Silver	Bronze	Fourth place
1987; Details	Indianapolis, United States	United States	Canada	Brazil	Cuba
1995; Details	Mar del Plata, Argentina	United States	Canada	Brazil	Cuba
1999; Details	Winnipeg, Canada	Brazil	Canada	Cuba	United States
2003; Details	Santo Domingo, Dominican Republic	Brazil	Argentina	Uruguay	United States
2007; Details	Rio de Janeiro, Brazil	Brazil	Cuba	Argentina	Dominican Republic
2011; Details	Guadalajara, Mexico	Brazil	Argentina	Dominican Republic	Mexico
2015; Details	Toronto, Canada	Brazil	Argentina	Uruguay	Mexico
2019; Details	Lima, Peru	Brazil	Argentina	Cuba	United States
2023; Details	Santiago, Chile	Brazil	Argentina	Paraguay	Chile
2027; Details	Lima, Peru				

=== Medal table (women) ===
Rank	Nation	Gold	Silver	Bronze	Total
1	Brazil	7	0	2	9
2	United States	2	0	0	2
3	Argentina	0	5	1	6
4	Canada	0	3	0	3
5	Cuba	0	1	2	3
6	Uruguay	0	0	2	2
7	Dominican Republic	0	0	1	1
7	Paraguay	0	0	1	1
Totals (8 entries)		9	9	9	27

=== Participation history (women) ===
Nation	(United States) 1987	(Argentina) 1995	(Canada) 1999	(Dominican Republic) 2003	(Brazil) 2007	(Mexico) 2011	(Canada) 2015	(Peru) 2019	(Chile) 2023	Years
Argentina	5th	5th	6th	2nd	3rd	2nd	2nd	2nd	2nd	9
Brazil	3rd	3rd	1st	1st	1st	1st	1st	1st	1st	9
Canada	2nd	2nd	2nd	-	6th	-	7th	7th	8th	7
Chile	-	-	-	-	-	5th	8th	-	4th	3
Cuba	4th	4th	3rd	-	2nd	-	5th	3rd	6th	7
Dominican Republic	-	-	-	5th	4th	3rd	-	5th	-	4
Mexico	-	-	-	6th	5th	4th	4th	-	-	4
Paraguay	-	-	-	-	7th	-	-	-	3rd	2
Peru	-	-	-	-	-	-	-	8th	-	1
Puerto Rico	-	-	-	-	8th	6th	6th	6th	5th	5
United States	1st	1st	4th	4th	-	8th	-	4th	-	6
Uruguay	-	-	5th	3rd	-	7th	3rd	-	7th	5
Total	5	5	6	6	8	8	8	8	8	

== Medal table ==
Rank	Nation	Gold	Silver	Bronze	Total
1	Brazil	10	5	4	19
2	Argentina	3	8	3	14
3	Cuba	3	2	3	8
4	United States	3	0	2	5
5	Canada	0	3	0	3
6	Chile	0	1	3	4
7	Uruguay	0	0	2	2
8	Dominican Republic	0	0	1	1
8	Paraguay	0	0	1	1
Totals (9 entries)		19	19	19	57

== See also ==
- Handball at the Junior Pan American Games
