= 2011 World Men's Handball Championship squads =

The 2011 World Men's Handball Championship squads. Each team consisted of 16 players.

Appearances, goals and ages as of tournament start, 13 January 2011.

== Group A ==
=== Bahrain ===
Head coach: (Bahrain) Bader Mirza

No.	Pos.	Name	Date of birth (age)	Height	App.	Goals	Club
1		Saeed Jawher	26 January 1972 (aged 38)	1.86 m			(Bahrain) Al-Ahli
2		Hasan Madan	16 January 1984 (aged 26)	1.82 m			(Bahrain) Bar-Bar
5		Hasan Al-Najar	20 January 1986 (aged 24)	1.86 m			(Bahrain) Al-Najma SC
7	RB	Ali Merza	7 July 1988 (aged 22)	1.84 m			(Bahrain) Al Tadamon
8	P	Hasan Al-Fardan	10 December 1988 (aged 22)	1.80 m			(Bahrain) Al-Ahli
10		Jaafar Abdulwader	13 October 1982 (aged 28)	1.81 m			(Bahrain) Bar-Bar
11		Sadiq Ali	24 January 1986 (aged 24)	1.68 m			(Bahrain) Al-Ahli
12		Mohamed Ahmed	1 November 1964 (aged 46)	1.83 m			(Bahrain) Al-Najma SC
15		Mahdi Madan	12 July 1986 (aged 24)	1.83 m			(Bahrain) Al-Najma SC
17		Maher Yahya	13 January 1977 (aged 34)	1.70 m			(Bahrain) Al-Ahli
19	P	Mohamed Merza	17 April 1987 (aged 23)	1.93 m			(Bahrain) Al-Ahli
20		Mahmood Al-Wanna	20 August 1985 (aged 25)	1.75 m			(Bahrain) Al-Ahli
21	GK	Mohamed Abdulhusain	12 August 1989 (aged 21)	1.86 m			(Bahrain) Al-Dair
23		Ali Yusuf	3 April 1987 (aged 23)	1.79 m			(Bahrain) Al-Najma SC
51		Mohamed Al-Mawabi	14 July 1988 (aged 22)	1.80 m			(Bahrain) Bar-Bar
99	CB	Husain Al-Sayyad (c)	14 January 1988 (aged 22)	1.74 m			(Bahrain) Al-Shabab

=== Egypt ===
Head coach: (Germany) Jorn Lommel

No.	Pos.	Name	Date of birth (age)	Height	App.	Goals	Club
1	GK	Karim Hendawy	1 May 1988 (aged 22)	188 cm			(Egypt) Zamalek SC
3	P	Mohamed Ramadan	13 September 1984 (aged 26)	187 cm			(Egypt) Zamalek SC
4		Belal Mabrouk	2 August 1984 (aged 26)				(Egypt) Zamalek SC
5		Moustafa Hussein	8 January 1984 (aged 27)				(Egypt) Al-Ahly SC
7	CB	Mohamed Hashem	23 January 1988 (aged 22)	178 cm			(Egypt) Aviation
8	P	Mohamed Ibrahim	7 March 1984 (aged 26)	180 cm			(Egypt) Al-Ahly SC
9		Amr El Kaioby	2 August 1984 (aged 26)				(Egypt) Al-Ahly SC
10	RB	Abou El Fetouh Razek	12 February 1987 (aged 23)	187 cm			(Egypt) Smouha
12	GK	Mohamed Nakib	6 April 1974 (aged 36)	195 cm			(Egypt) Police
14		Mohamed El Bohy	6 January 1990 (aged 21)	198 cm			(Egypt) Zamalek SC
16		Hady Sakr	2 September 1986 (aged 24)				(Egypt) Al-Ahly SC
17	LW	Ahmed Yousef	4 March 1988 (aged 22)	187 cm			(Egypt) Aviation
19		Mohamed Abdelwares	1 July 1984 (aged 26)				(Egypt) Al-Ahly SC
20		Mohamed Keshk	18 April 1980 (aged 30)				(Egypt) Aviation
22		Omar Haggag	13 March 1988 (aged 22)				(Egypt) Police
39		Eslam Hassan	2 July 1988 (aged 22)				(Egypt) Al-Ahly SC
66	RB	Ahmed El Ahmar	27 January 1984 (aged 26)	187 cm			(Egypt) Zamalek SC
89	P	Mohamed Mamdouh	1 April 1989 (aged 21)	191 cm			(Egypt) Zamalek SC

=== France ===
Head coach: (France) Claude Onesta

No.	Pos.	Name	Date of birth (age)	Height	App.	Goals	Club
2	LB	Jérôme Fernandez	7 March 1977 (aged 33)	1.99 m	305	1209	(Germany) THW Kiel
3	P	Didier Dinart	18 January 1977 (aged 33)	1.97 m	331	154	(Spain) BM Ciudad Real
4	RB	Xavier Barachet	19 November 1988 (aged 22)	1.95 m	17	23	(France) Chambéry Savoie HB
6	P	Bertrand Gille	24 March 1978 (aged 32)	1.87 m	233	716	(Germany) HSV Hamburg
9	RW	Guillaume Joli	27 March 1985 (aged 25)	1.78 m	39	102	(Spain) BM Valladolid
11	LW	Samuel Honrubia	11 December 1975 (aged 35)	1.80 m	5	14	(France) Montpellier HB
12	GK	Daouda Karaboué	11 December 1975 (aged 35)	1.98 m	106	0	(France) Toulouse HB
13	LB	Nikola Karabatic	11 April 1984 (aged 26)	1.95 m	162	688	(France) Montpellier HB
15	CB	Franck Junillon	28 November 1978 (aged 32)	1.95 m	92	121	(France) USAM Nîmes
16	GK	Thierry Omeyer	2 November 1976 (aged 34)	1.92 m	240	0	(Germany) THW Kiel
18	RB	William Accambray	8 April 1988 (aged 22)	1.94 m	9	26	(France) Montpellier HB
19	RW	Luc Abalo	6 September 1984 (aged 26)	1.82 m	122	421	(Spain) BM Ciudad Real
20	P	Cédric Sorhaindo	7 July 1984 (aged 26)	1.92 m	62	108	(Spain) FC Barcelona
21	LW	Michaël Guigou	28 January 1982 (aged 28)	1.79 m	141	510	(France) Montpellier HB
22	LB	Bertrand Roine	17 February 1981 (aged 29)	1.98 m	11	32	(France) Chambéry Savoie HB
23	RB	Sébastien Bosquet	24 February 1979 (aged 31)	1.98 m	86	172	(France) Dunkerque HB
27	LW	Arnaud Bingo	12 October 1987 (aged 23)	1.90 m	2	4	Tremblay en France

=== Germany ===
Head coach: (Germany) Heiner Brand

No.	Pos.	Name	Date of birth (age)	Height	App.	Goals	Club
1	GK	Johannes Bitter	2 September 1982 (aged 28)	2.04 m	133	2	(Germany) HSV Hamburg
2	LB	Pascal Hens	26 March 1980 (aged 30)	2.03 m	175	514	(Germany) HSV Hamburg
3	LW	Uwe Gensheimer	26 October 1986 (aged 24)	1.88 m	45	148	(Germany) Rhein-Neckar Löwen
4	P	Oliver Roggisch	25 August 1978 (aged 32)	2.02 m	145	29	(Germany) Rhein-Neckar Löwen
5	LW	Dominik Klein	16 December 1983 (aged 27)	1.90 m	119	227	(Germany) THW Kiel
6	RB	Adrian Pfahl	30 July 1982 (aged 28)	1.92 m	9	30	(Germany) VfL Gummersbach
8	P	Sebastian Preiß	8 February 1981 (aged 29)	1.95 m	132	328	(Germany) TBV Lemgo
9	P	Jacob Heinl	3 October 1986 (aged 24)	1.95 m	8	11	(Germany) SG Flensburg-Handewitt
11	RB	Holger Glandorf	30 March 1983 (aged 27)	1.95 m	129	455	(Germany) TBV Lemgo
12	GK	Silvio Heinevetter	21 October 1984 (aged 26)	1.94 m	48	0	(Germany) Füchse Berlin
13	LB	Sven-Sören Christophersen	9 May 1985 (aged 25)	1.98 m	45	75	(Germany) Füchse Berlin
14	RW	Patrick Groetzki	4 July 1989 (aged 21)	1.89 m	99	310	(Germany) Rhein-Neckar Löwen
18	CB	Michael Kraus	28 September 1983 (aged 27)	1.87 m	102	330	(Germany) HSV Hamburg
20	RW	Christian Sprenger	6 April 1983 (aged 27)	1.90 m	55	130	(Germany) THW Kiel
21	LB	Lars Kaufmann	25 February 1982 (aged 28)	1.99 m	99	247	(Germany) Frisch Auf Göppingen
24	CB	Michael Haaß	12 December 1983 (aged 27)	1.94 m	67	95	(Germany) Frisch Auf Göppingen

=== Spain ===
Head coach: (Spain) Valero Rivera

No.	Pos.	Name	Date of birth (age)	Height	App.	Goals	Club
1	GK	José Javier Hombrados	7 April 1972 (aged 38)	1.97 m	221	1	(Spain) BM Ciudad Real
2	LB	Alberto Entrerríos	7 November 1976 (aged 34)	1.94 m	203	626	(Spain) BM Ciudad Real
3	RB	Eduardo Gurbindo	8 November 1987 (aged 23)	1.94 m	17	24	(Spain) BM Valladolid
4	RW	Albert Rocas	16 July 1982 (aged 28)	1.88 m	96	369	(Spain) FC Barcelona
5	RB	Jorge Maqueda Peño	6 February 1988 (aged 22)	1.97 m	7	15	(Spain) CAI BM Aragón
6	P	Rubén Garabaya	15 September 1978 (aged 32)	2.01 m	148	295	(Spain) CB Ciudad de Logroño
9	LB	Raúl Entrerríos	12 February 1981 (aged 29)	1.93 m	117	252	(Spain) FC Barcelona
13	P	Julen Aguinagalde	8 December 1982 (aged 28)	1.95 m	53	117	(Spain) BM Ciudad Real
14	RW	Roberto García Parrondo	12 January 1980 (aged 31)	1.87 m	51	124	(Spain) BM Ciudad Real
15	LW	Cristian Ugalde	19 October 1987 (aged 23)	1.87 m	36	87	(Spain) FC Barcelona
16	GK	Arpad Šterbik	20 November 1979 (aged 31)	2.00 m	11	0	(Spain) BM Ciudad Real
17	LW	Juanín García	28 August 1977 (aged 33)	1.76 m	174	727	(Spain) FC Barcelona
18	CB	Iker Romero	15 June 1980 (aged 30)	1.96 m	168	634	(Spain) FC Barcelona
20	CB	Chema Rodríguez	5 January 1980 (aged 31)	1.87 m	94	141	(Spain) BM Ciudad Real
21	CB	Joan Cañellas	30 September 1986 (aged 24)	1.90 m	23	56	(Spain) BM Ciudad Real
24	LB	Viran Morros	15 December 1983 (aged 27)	1.99 m	56	70	(Spain) BM Ciudad Real

=== Tunisia ===
Head coach: (France) Alain Portes

No.	Pos.	Name	Date of birth (age)	Height	App.	Goals	Club
1	GK	Makrem Missaoui	14 February 1981 (aged 29)	1.88 m	114	0	(Tunisia) Club Africain
3	Left back	Selim Hedoui	1 October 1983 (aged 27)	1.99 m	145	269	(Qatar) Sadd Sports Club
4		Brahim Lagha	19 April 1985 (aged 25)	1.88 m	69	117	(Tunisia) Espérance Sportive de Tunis
5	Pivot	Mahmoud Gharbi	11 February 1982 (aged 28)	1.91 m	118	208	(France) HBC Nantes
6	Pivot	Issam Tej	29 July 1979 (aged 31)	1.87 m	232	582	(France) Montpellier HB
7	Right wing	Jaleleddine Touati	12 July 1982 (aged 28)	1.79 m	129	288	(France) Dunkerque HB
10	Centre back	Kamel Alouini	6 July 1988 (aged 22)	1.87 m	8	18	(Tunisia) Club Africain
12	GK	Majed Hamza	8 February 1983 (aged 27)	1.86 m	3	0	(Tunisia) Étoile Sportive du Sahel
13		Yassine Sami	1 May 1985 (aged 25)	1.89 m	24	36	(Tunisia) Étoile Sportive du Sahel
15	CB	Khaled Haj Youssef	12 January 1989 (aged 22)	1.89 m	0	0	(Tunisia) Club Africain
16	GK	Rafik Braham	2 January 1982 (aged 29)	1.94 m	0	0	(Tunisia) Sporting Club Moknine
17		Anis Gatfi	22 October 1984 (aged 26)	1.95 m	35	73	(Tunisia) Espérance Sportive de Tunis
19		Bassem Mrabet	3 March 1986 (aged 24)	1.93 m	55	98	(Tunisia) Espérance Sportive de Tunis
20	CB	Heykel Megannem	28 February 1977 (aged 33)	1.86 m	238	520	(France) Saint-Raphaël Var Handball
21	Left wing	Anouar Ayed	9 May 1978 (aged 32)	1.80 m	249	537	(France) Toulouse HB
22	Centre back	Sobhi Saied	26 September 1982 (aged 28)	1.78 m	115	258	(United Arab Emirates) Achabeb Al Imarati
31	Left back	Wael Jallouz	3 May 1991 (aged 19)	1.97 m	3	0	(Tunisia) AS Hammamet

== Group B ==
=== Austria ===
Head coach: (Sweden) Magnus Andersson

No.	Pos.	Name	Date of birth (age)	Height	App.	Goals	Club
1	GK	Thomas Bauer	24 January 1986 (aged 24)	1.89 m	39	0	(Germany) HSG FrankfurtRheinMain
3	P	Patrick Fölser	16 November 1976 (aged 34)	1.93 m	185	511	(Germany) HSG Düsseldorf
7	RB	Janko Božović	14 July 1985 (aged 25)	2.03 m	33	75	(Slovenia) RD Slovan
8	CB	Richard Wöss	10 October 1986 (aged 24)	1.87 m	40	66	(Germany) TUSEM Essen
9	W	Martin Abadir	19 June 1981 (aged 29)	1.96 m	57	89	(Austria) AON Fivers
10	RB	Lucas Mayer	16 February 1983 (aged 27)	1.85 m	35	86	(Austria) A1 Bregenz HB
12	GK	Nikola Marinovic	29 August 1976 (aged 34)	1.98 m	90	0	(Germany) HBW Balingen-Weilstetten
14	CB	Viktor Szilágyi	16 September 1978 (aged 32)	1.96 m	144	659	(Germany) SG Flensburg-Handewitt
15	P	Fabian Posch	5 January 1988 (aged 23)	1.98 m	20	22	(Austria) A1 Bregenz HB
17	W	Konrad Wilczynski	9 February 1982 (aged 28)	1.80 m	96	431	(Germany) Füchse Berlin
18	RW	Michael Jochum	8 November 1985 (aged 25)	1.83 m	12	12	(Austria) Alpla HC Hard
19	CB	Klemens Kainmüller	2 March 1980 (aged 30)	1.85 m	95	143	(Austria) HIT medalp Tirol
20	CB	Bernd Friede	18 February 1980 (aged 30)	1.91 m	52	100	(Austria) Alpla HC Hard
21	LB	Roland Schlinger	17 September 1982 (aged 28)	1.92 m	111	428	(Germany) HBW Balingen-Weilstetten
22	LB	Markus Wagesreiter	14 January 1982 (aged 28)	1.98 m	84	81	(Austria) A1 Bregenz HB
28	RW	Robert Weber	25 November 1985 (aged 25)	1.79 m	76	257	(Germany) SC Magdeburg

=== Brazil ===
Head coach: (Spain) Javier García Cuesta

No.	Pos.	Name	Date of birth (age)	Height	App.	Goals	Club
3	RB	Fernando Pacheco Filho	25 May 1983 (aged 27)	1.93 m			(Brazil) E.C. Pinheiros
7	RB	Renato Tupan Ruy	7 June 1979 (aged 31)	1.86 m			(Brazil) A.D.C. Metodista
9		Leonardo Bortolini	10 April 1977 (aged 33)	1.85 m			(Brazil) Unopar/Londrina
10		Gil Pires	24 January 1982 (aged 28)	1.94 m			(Brazil) A.D.C. Metodista
11		Jaqson Kojoroski	3 January 1979 (aged 32)	1.94 m			(Brazil) Unoesc/Orbenk/PMC
12		Alexandre Vasconcelos	19 December 1978 (aged 32)	1.94 m			(Brazil) Unoesc/Orbenk/PMC
14	LB	Thiagus dos Santos	25 January 1989 (aged 21)	2.01 m			(Brazil) E.C. Pinheiros
16	GK	Luís Ricardo Nascimento	24 September 1981 (aged 29)	2.00 m			(Brazil) Unopar/Londrina
17	P	Alexandro Pozzer	21 December 1988 (aged 22)	1.94 m			(Brazil) E.C. Pinheiros
18	LW	Felipe Ribeiro	4 May 1985 (aged 25)	1.87 m			(Brazil) E.C. Pinheiros
19	RW	Fábio Chiuffa	10 March 1989 (aged 21)	1.87 m			(Brazil) A.D.C. Metodista
21	RB	Gustavo Cardoso	9 January 1982 (aged 29)	1.92 m			(Brazil) A.D.C. Metodista
22		Daniel Bonfim	17 January 1987 (aged 23)	1.86 m			(Brazil) TCC/Unitau/Unimed/Tarumã
25	P	Vinícius Teixeira	3 April 1988 (aged 22)	1.88 m			(Brazil) A.D.C. Metodista
26	GK	Leonardo Terçariol	14 April 1987 (aged 23)	1.93 m			(Brazil) A.D.C. Metodista
28		Guilherme Oliveira	8 January 1985 (aged 26)	1.94 m			(Brazil) E.C. Pinheiros
86		Ales Silva	6 February 1986 (aged 24)	2.00 m			(Spain) CB Ciudad de Logroño

=== Hungary ===
Head coach: (Hungary) Lajos Mocsai

No.	Pos.	Name	Date of birth (age)	Height	App.	Goals	Club
3	LB	Ferenc Ilyés	20 December 1981 (aged 29)	1.98 m	136	366	(Germany) TBV Lemgo
5	CB	Gábor Császár	16 June 1984 (aged 26)	1.83 m	121	355	(Hungary) MKB Veszprém KC
6	RB	Tamás Mocsai	9 December 1978 (aged 32)	1.96 m	119	270	(Germany) SG Flensburg Handewitt
7	P	Gyula Gál	18 August 1976 (aged 34)	1.93 m	171	428	(Croatia) RK Zagreb
8	LW	Gergő Iváncsik	30 November 1981 (aged 29)	1.90 m	171	463	(Hungary) MKB Veszprém KC
9	RW	Tamás Iváncsik	3 April 1983 (aged 27)	1.80 m	84	202	(Hungary) MKB Veszprém KC
10	RW	Gergely Harsányi	3 May 1981 (aged 29)	1.91 m	80	108	(Hungary) Tatabánya-Carbonex KC
12	GK	Nándor Fazekas	16 October 1976 (aged 34)	1.92 m	181	1	(Hungary) MKB Veszprém KC
14	LB	Carlos Pérez	26 August 1971 (aged 39)	1.97 m	41	246	(Hungary) MKB Veszprém KC
15	LW	Szabolcs Törő	10 March 1983 (aged 27)	1.83 m	72	135	(Hungary) SC Pick Szeged
16	GK	Roland Mikler	20 September 1984 (aged 26)	1.90 m	57	0	(Hungary) SC Pick Szeged
18	CB	Kornél Nagy	21 November 1986 (aged 24)	1.92 m	50	79	(Hungary) MKB Veszprém KC
20	RW	Péter Gulyás	4 March 1984 (aged 26)	2.01 m	49	128	(Hungary) MKB Veszprém KC
22	LB	Dávid Katzirz	25 June 1980 (aged 30)	1.90 m	74	109	(Hungary) SC Pick Szeged
25	P	Szabolcs Zubai	31 March 1984 (aged 26)	1.91 m	94	129	(Hungary) SC Pick Szeged
28	P	Timuzsin Schuch	5 June 1985 (aged 25)	1.97 m	31	31	(Romania) HCM Constanța
35	CB	Máté Lékai	16 June 1988 (aged 22)	1.90 m	9	17	(Hungary) SC Pick Szeged

=== Iceland ===
Head coach: (Iceland) Guðmundur Guðmundsson

No.	Pos.	Name	Date of birth (age)	Height	App.	Goals	Club
1	GK	Björgvin Páll Gústavsson	24 May 1985 (aged 25)	1.93 m	76	3	(Switzerland) Kadetten Schaffhausen
2	P	Vignir Svavarsson	20 June 1980 (aged 30)	1.94 m	135	148	(Germany) TSV Hannover-Burgdorf
4	CB	Aron Pálmarsson	19 July 1990 (aged 20)	1.93 m	27	62	(Germany) THW Kiel
5	LB	Ingimundur Ingimundarson	29 January 1980 (aged 30)	1.93 m	81	57	(Denmark) AaB Håndbold
6	RB	Ásgeir Örn Hallgrímsson	17 February 1984 (aged 26)	1.91 m	134	178	(Germany) TSV Hannover-Burgdorf
7	LB	Arnór Atlason	23 July 1984 (aged 26)	1.91 m	99	238	(Denmark) AG København
8	RW	Þórir Ólafsson	28 November 1979 (aged 31)	1.89 m	51	112	(Germany) TuS Nettelstedt-Lübbecke
9	LW	Guðjón Valur Sigurðsson	8 August 1979 (aged 31)	1.87 m	234	1123	(Germany) Rhein-Neckar Löwen
10	CB	Snorri Guðjónsson	17 October 1981 (aged 29)	1.87 m	168	619	(Denmark) AG København
11	RB	Ólafur Stefánsson	3 July 1973 (aged 37)	1.96 m	310	1443	(Germany) Rhein-Neckar Löwen
15	RW	Alexander Petersson	2 July 1980 (aged 30)	1.86 m	109	429	(Germany) Füchse Berlin
16	GK	Hreiðar Guðmundsson	29 November 1980 (aged 30)	1.93 m	105	2	(Germany) TV Emsdetten
17	CB	Sverre Andreas Jakobsson	8 February 1977 (aged 33)	1.96 m	96	19	(Germany) TV Grosswallstadt
18	P	Róbert Gunnarsson	22 May 1980 (aged 30)	1.90 m	174	553	(Germany) Rhein-Neckar Löwen
19	LB	Sigurbergur Sveinsson	12 August 1987 (aged 23)	1.92 m	29	41	(Germany) DHC Rheinland
21	P	Kári Kristjánsson	28 October 1984 (aged 26)	1.98 m	14	21	(Germany) HSG Wetzlar

=== Japan ===
Head coach: (Japan) Kiyoharu Sakamaki

No.	Pos.	Name	Date of birth (age)	Height	App.	Goals	Club
1	GK	Katsuyuki Shinouchi	3 February 1982 (aged 28)	1.76 m	12	0	(Japan) Osaki Electric
2		Kenji Toyoda	24 December 1979 (aged 31)	1.81 m	64	284	(Japan) Osaki Electric
5		Makoto Suematsu	19 March 1982 (aged 28)	1.79 m	53	221	(Japan) Daido Steel
6		Hideyuki Murakami	16 June 1981 (aged 29)	1.72 m	11	32	(Japan) Toyota Boshoku Kyushu
7	LW	Daisuke Miyazaki	6 June 1981 (aged 29)	1.75 m	91	453	(Japan) Osaki Electric
8		Toru Takeda	17 September 1982 (aged 28)	1.92 m	44	63	(Japan) Daido Steel
10		Hidenori Kishigawa	28 November 1984 (aged 26)	1.88 m	33	55	(Japan) Daido Steel
13		Kyosuke Tomita	11 October 1983 (aged 27)	1.90 m	40	74	(Japan) Toyota Auto Body
14		Hideaki Nagashima	24 March 1977 (aged 33)	1.89 m	84	82	(Japan) Osaki Electric
15		Jun Mori	12 March 1987 (aged 23)	1.89 m	17	25	(Japan) Osaki Electric
16	GK	Masayuki Matsumura	13 December 1978 (aged 32)	1.88 m	27	0	(Japan) Wakunaga Pharmaceutical
18		Yoshiaki Nomura	22 January 1987 (aged 23)	1.86 m	23	72	(Japan) Daido Steel
20		Hozuki Higashinagahama	21 October 1987 (aged 23)	1.86 m	5	6	(Japan) Osaki Electric
21	GK	Akihito Kai	29 April 1987 (aged 23)	1.84 m	2	0	(Japan) Toyota Auto Body
22	CB	Tetsuya Kadoyama	22 November 1983 (aged 27)	1.86 m	59	200	(Japan) Toyota Auto Body
23		Shusaku Higashinagahama	3 February 1984 (aged 26)	1.85 m	40	75	(Japan) Wakunaga Pharmaceutical

=== Norway ===
Head coach: (Sweden) Robert Hedin

No.	Pos.	Name	Date of birth (age)	Height	App.	Goals	Club
1	GK	Steinar Ege	10 April 1972 (aged 38)	1.94 m	245	1	(Denmark) AG København
5	P	Frank Løke	6 February 1980 (aged 30)	1.94 m	178	638	(Germany) TuS Nettelstedt-Lübbecke
6	CB	Kjetil Strand	2 October 1979 (aged 31)	1.90 m	97	466	(Norway) Stavanger Håndball
7	RW	Lars Erik Bjørnsen	20 July 1982 (aged 28)	1.83 m	73	148	(Denmark) Team Tvis Holstebro
8	P	Bjarte Myrhol	29 May 1982 (aged 28)	1.90 m	105	247	(Germany) Rhein-Neckar Löwen
9	CB	Børge Lund	13 March 1979 (aged 31)	1.96 m	168	420	(Germany) Rhein-Neckar Löwen
10	LW	Håvard Tvedten	29 June 1978 (aged 32)	1.82 m	167	626	(Spain) BM Valladolid
11	LB	Erlend Mamelund	1 May 1984 (aged 26)	1.97 m	72	225	(Norway) Haslum HK
12	GK	Ole Erevik	9 January 1981 (aged 30)	1.96 m	109	0	(Denmark) KIF Kolding
13	RW	Christoffer Rambo	18 November 1989 (aged 21)	2.01 m	25	31	(Spain) BM Valladolid
14	LB	Espen Lie Hansen	1 May 1989 (aged 21)	1.96 m	11	17	(Norway) Drammen HK
15	LB	Kristian Kjelling	6 September 1980 (aged 30)	1.97 m	135	525	(Denmark) AaB Håndbold
18	CB	Vegard Samdahl	21 March 1978 (aged 32)	1.94 m	52	75	(Poland) Wisła Płock
19	LW	Thomas Skoglund	3 March 1983 (aged 27)	1.82 m	86	172	(Denmark) Team Tvis Holstebro
20	P	Einar Sand Koren	12 November 1984 (aged 26)	1.88 m	33	50	(Norway) Haslum HK
25	RB	Eivind Tangen	4 May 1993 (aged 17)	1.93 m	5	0	(Norway) Fyllingen Handball

== Group C ==
=== Algeria ===
Head coach: (Algeria) Salah Bouchekriou

No.	Pos.	Name	Date of birth (age)	Height	App.	Goals	Club
2		Abdelkader Rahim	12 July 1990 (aged 20)	1.88 m	5	8	(France) ASPTT Nancy
4	RB	Hamza Zouaoui	4 February 1987 (aged 23)	1.85 m	70	140	(Algeria) GS Pétroliers
5	LW	Salah Eddine Cheikh	24 February 1983 (aged 27)	1.84 m	15	74	(Algeria) HBC El Biar
6	LB	Messaoud Berkous	20 July 1989 (aged 21)	1.89 m	70	178	(Algeria) GS Pétroliers
7	P	Hichem Boudrali	29 October 1977 (aged 33)	1.85 m	99	188	(Algeria) GS Pétroliers
8		Tahar Labane	2 July 1977 (aged 33)	1.90 m	101	150	(France) Aix En Provence
9		Zine Eddine Boumendjel	12 July 1989 (aged 21)	1.92 m	0	0	(Algeria) TRB Bab El Oued
10	LB	Sassi Boultif	9 January 1983 (aged 28)	1.91 m	85	195	(France) Istres OPH
12	GK	Samir Kerbouche	16 December 1978 (aged 32)	1.88 m	60	0	(Algeria) CRB Baraki
14	LW	Alah Khoumini Hamoud Ayat	10 August 1990 (aged 20)	1.86 m	5	2	(Algeria) ES Ain Touta
16	GK	Adel Bousmal	1 May 1985 (aged 25)	1.88 m	10	0	(Algeria) GS Boufarik
17	RB	Abderrahim Berriah	19 January 1988 (aged 22)	1.95 m	70	185	(Tunisia) Étoile Sportive du Sahel
18	P	Abdérazak Hamad	25 June 1975 (aged 35)	1.87 m	94	201	(France) Pays d'Aix Université Club Handball
19	RW	Messaoud Layadi	24 March 1982 (aged 28)	1.86 m	70	189	(Algeria) GS Pétroliers
20	LW	Hechem Daoud	9 January 1992 (aged 19)	1.92 m	5	3	(Algeria) HBC El Biar
21	P	Mohamed Mokrani	31 January 1981 (aged 29)	1.88 m	0	0	(France) Dunkerque HB
22	GK	Abdelmalek Slahdji	8 August 1983 (aged 27)	1.90 m	93	0	(Algeria) GS Pétroliers

=== Australia ===
Head coach: (Australia) Taip Ramadani

No.	Pos.	Name	Date of birth (age)	Height	App.	Goals	Club
1	GK	Ognjen Latinovic	2 August 1985 (aged 25)	1.80 m	32	0	(Australia) HC Griffith Tigers
2		Bojan Stojanovic	30 January 1985 (aged 25)	1.87 m	7	18	(Australia) HC Griffith Tigers
3		James Blondell	21 February 1985 (aged 25)	1.76 m	29	93	(Sweden) Stavstens IF
4	RW	Bevan Calvert	4 April 1986 (aged 24)	1.77 m	31	89	(Germany) TSV Altenholz
5	P	Tommy Fletcher	18 March 1990 (aged 20)	1.86 m	13	61	(Sweden) UoIF Matteuspojkarna
6		Jason Hoppner	5 August 1975 (aged 35)	1.84 m	22	60	(Australia) University of Queensland
8		Michael Thomas	13 March 1986 (aged 24)	1.88 m	26	29	(Australia) Harbourside
10		Kristian Groenintwoud	3 May 1973 (aged 37)	1.94 m	50	210	(Australia) Sydney University HC
14	LW	Mitchell Hedges	14 February 1991 (aged 19)	1.76 m	3	2	(Australia) Harbourside
15	RW	Daniel Kelly	7 May 1988 (aged 22)	1.76 m	18	36	(Australia) University of Queensland
17		Joshua Parmenter	21 July 1982 (aged 28)	1.78 m	27	78	(Australia) Harbourside
20		Luka Krajnc	2 October 1989 (aged 21)	1.78 m	7	27	(Australia) Hills HC
21	LB	Ognjen Matic	21 August 1989 (aged 21)	1.97 m	15	20	(Australia) UTS Handball Club
22		Nejc Kodric	15 December 1990 (aged 20)	1.89 m	4	9	(Australia) Victoria Handball
27	GK	Pascal Winkler	1 June 1972 (aged 38)	1.83 m	6	1	(Australia) Sydney University HC
31	LB	Nemanja Subotic	5 March 1983 (aged 27)	1.94 m	22	67	(Serbia) RK BASK

=== Croatia ===
Head coach: (Croatia) Slavko Goluža

No.	Pos.	Name	Date of birth (age)	Height	App.	Goals	Club
1	GK	Marin Šego	8 February 1985 (aged 25)	1.94 m	4	0	(Croatia) RK Zagreb
4	CB	Ivano Balić	1 April 1979 (aged 31)	1.97 m	165	485	(Croatia) RK Zagreb
5	CB	Domagoj Duvnjak	1 June 1988 (aged 22)	1.97 m	65	207	(Germany) HSV Hamburg
6	LB	Blaženko Lacković	25 December 1980 (aged 30)	1.95 m	151	442	(Germany) HSV Hamburg
7	RW	Vedran Zrnić	26 September 1979 (aged 31)	1.88 m	153	357	(Germany) VfL Gummersbach
8	RB	Marko Kopljar	12 February 1986 (aged 24)	2.10 m	33	50	(Croatia) RK Zagreb
9	P	Igor Vori	20 September 1980 (aged 30)	2.02 m	152	410	(Germany) HSV Hamburg
10	LB	Jakov Gojun	18 April 1986 (aged 24)	2.03 m	42	21	(Croatia) RK Zagreb
11	RW	Jerko Matulić	20 April 1990 (aged 20)	1.87 m	0	0	(Croatia) EMC Split
14	CB	Drago Vuković	3 August 1983 (aged 27)	1.94 m	79	105	(Germany) VfL Gummersbach
21	RB	Denis Buntić	13 October 1982 (aged 28)	1.98 m	69	140	(Spain) CB Ademar León
24	LB	Tonči Valčić	9 June 1978 (aged 32)	1.94 m	133	211	(Croatia) RK Zagreb
25	GK	Mirko Alilović	15 September 1985 (aged 25)	2.00 m	73	0	(Slovenia) Celje Pivovarna Laško
26	LW	Manuel Štrlek	1 December 1988 (aged 22)	1.81 m	18	56	(Croatia) RK Zagreb
28	P	Željko Musa	8 January 1986 (aged 25)	2.00 m	10	4	(Slovenia) RK Gorenje
29	LW	Ivan Ninčević	27 October 1981 (aged 29)	1.85 m	12	21	(Germany) Füchse Berlin

=== Denmark ===
Head coach: (Denmark) Ulrik Wilbek

No.	Pos.	Name	Date of birth (age)	Height	App.	Goals	Club
1	GK	Niklas Landin Jacobsen	19 December 1988 (aged 22)	2.00 m	38	0	(Denmark) Bjerringbro-Silkeborg
2	CB	Thomas Mogensen	30 January 1983 (aged 27)	1.86 m	64	152	(Germany) SG Flensburg-Handewitt
3	RB	Mads Christiansen	3 May 1986 (aged 24)	1.94 m	17	40	(Denmark) AaB Håndbold
4	LB	Lasse Boesen	18 September 1979 (aged 31)	1.92 m	133	369	(Germany) SG Flensburg-Handewitt
6	P	Jacob Bagersted	25 March 1987 (aged 23)	1.94 m	12	18	(Denmark) AG København
8	CB	Rasmus Lauge Schmidt	20 June 1991 (aged 19)	1.93 m	7	8	(Denmark) Bjerringbro-Silkeborg
9	LW	Lars Christiansen	18 April 1972 (aged 38)	1.82 m	309	1426	(Denmark) KIF Kolding
11	LW	Anders Eggert	14 May 1982 (aged 28)	1.79 m	62	235	(Germany) SG Flensburg-Handewitt
12	GK	Sørenn Rasmussen	21 August 1976 (aged 34)	1.93 m	21	0	(Germany) SG Flensburg-Handewitt
13	CB	Bo Spellerberg	24 July 1979 (aged 31)	1.92 m	168	254	(Denmark) KIF Kolding
15	P	Jesper Nøddesbo	23 October 1980 (aged 30)	1.99 m	117	256	(Spain) FC Barcelona
17	RW	Lasse Svan Hansen	31 August 1983 (aged 27)	1.84 m	53	106	(Germany) SG Flensburg-Handewitt
18	RW	Hans Lindberg	1 August 1981 (aged 29)	1.88 m	117	285	(Germany) HSV Hamburg
19	P	René Toft Hansen	11 January 1984 (aged 27)	2.00 m	21	34	(Denmark) AG København
22	RB	Kasper Søndergaard	9 June 1981 (aged 29)	1.90 m	76	174	(Denmark) KIF Kolding
24	LB	Mikkel Hansen	22 October 1987 (aged 23)	1.92 m	51	218	(Denmark) AG København
26	LB	Kasper Nielsen	9 June 1975 (aged 35)	1.91 m	143	283	(Denmark) Bjerringbro-Silkeborg

=== Romania ===
Head coach: (Romania) Vasile Stîngă

No.	Pos.	Name	Date of birth (age)	Height	App.	Goals	Club
1	GK	Ionuț Ciobanu	23 September 1984 (aged 26)	2.02 m	16	0	(Romania) Energia Târgu Jiu
8		Iulian Stamate	23 May 1983 (aged 27)	2.00 m	54	96	(Romania) CSM București
11	LB	Alexandru Șimicu	8 October 1988 (aged 22)	2.00 m	11	11	(Romania) CSU Politehnica Timişoara
14	RW	Laurențiu Toma	28 June 1981 (aged 29)	1.89 m	121	320	(Romania) HCM Constanța
15	RB	Valentin Ghionea	29 April 1984 (aged 26)	1.95 m	108	601	(Romania) CS UCM Reşiţa
16	GK	Mihai Popescu	15 March 1985 (aged 25)	1.96 m	69	1	(Romania) HCM Constanța
17		Ionuţ Georgescu	16 June 1982 (aged 28)	1.88 m	70	192	(Romania) CS UCM Reşiţa
18	RW	Marius Sadoveac	7 May 1985 (aged 25)	1.87 m	45	102	(Romania) HCM Constanța
20	RB	Rareș Jurcă	29 August 1983 (aged 27)	1.94 m	122	264	(Switzerland) Kadetten Schaffhausen
23		Aurel Florea	3 August 1983 (aged 27)	1.88 m	10	36	(Romania) CSU Politehnica Timişoara
24		Marius Novanc	8 November 1980 (aged 30)	1.91 m	93	200	(Romania) CSU Politehnica Timişoara
25		Alexandru Sabou	20 April 1982 (aged 28)	1.84 m	27	58	(Romania) HCM Constanța
26		Alexandru Stamate	20 February 1982 (aged 28)	2.08 m	17	63	(Romania) CS UCM Reşiţa
28	LB	Alexandru Csepreghi	28 March 1987 (aged 23)	1.95 m	37	121	(Romania) HCM Constanța
33		Daniel Mureşan	9 July 1986 (aged 24)	1.96 m	20	22	(Romania) HCM Constanța
34	CB	Cristian Fenici	13 February 1986 (aged 24)	1.87 m	49	44	(Romania) CS UCM Reşiţa
85		Dan Savenco	12 October 1985 (aged 25)	1.98 m	35	43	(Romania) CSU Politehnica Timişoara

=== Serbia ===
Head coach: (Serbia) Veselin Vuković

No.	Pos.	Name	Date of birth (age)	Height	App.	Goals	Club
3	RW	Nemanja Pribak	26 March 1984 (aged 26)	1.88 m	2	5	(France) HBC Nantes
5	CB	Žarko Šešum	16 June 1986 (aged 24)	1.95 m	73	200	(Germany) Rhein-Neckar Löwen
6	RB	Marko Vujin	7 December 1984 (aged 26)	1.96 m	43	152	(Hungary) MKB Veszprém KC
7	LW	Ivan Nikčević	11 February 1981 (aged 29)	1.81 m	58	230	(Spain) BM Granollers
9	RW	Danimir Curković	5 January 1984 (aged 27)	1.94 m	0	0	(Spain) BM Antequera
11	P	Alem Toskić	12 February 1982 (aged 28)	1.90 m	89	201	(Slovenia) Celje
12	GK	Darko Stanić	8 October 1978 (aged 32)	1.90 m	40	0	(Slovenia) Koper
13	LB	Momir Ilić	22 December 1981 (aged 29)	2.00 m	73	228	(Germany) THW Kiel
14	RB	Mladen Bojinović	17 January 1977 (aged 33)	2.01 m	102	322	(France) Montpellier HB
15	LW	Dobrivoje Marković	22 April 1986 (aged 24)	1.91 m	60	138	(Spain) BM Ciudad Encantada
16	GK	Dimitrije Pejanović	9 July 1974 (aged 36)	1.98 m	58	0	(Spain) CB Torrevieja
17	RW	Rajko Prodanović	24 April 1986 (aged 24)	1.86 m	56	126	(North Macedonia) HC Vardar
18	P	Rastko Stojković	12 July 1981 (aged 29)	1.90 m	28	71	(Poland) Vive Targi Kielce
20	LB	Momir Rnić	1 November 1987 (aged 23)	1.97 m	23	42	(Slovenia) Celje Pivovarna Laško
22	P	Uroš Vilovski	25 February 1984 (aged 26)	1.93 m	37	82	(Hungary) MKB Veszprém KC
23	LB	Nenad Vučković	23 August 1980 (aged 30)	1.92 m	69	162	(Germany) MT Melsungen
26	RB	Ivan Stanković	27 April 1982 (aged 28)	1.92 m	12	19	(Spain) CAI BM Aragón

== Group D ==
=== Argentina ===
Head coach: (Argentina) Eduardo Gallardo

No.	Pos.	Name	Date of birth (age)	Height	App.	Goals	Club
1	GK	Matías Schulz	12 February 1982 (aged 28)	1.92 m	96	0	(Spain) Badajoz
2	LW	Federico Fernández	17 October 1989 (aged 21)	1.89 m	42	140	(Argentina) UNLu
3	RW	Federico Pizarro	7 September 1986 (aged 24)	1.83 m	41	102	(Argentina) Sedalo
4	CB	Sebastián Simonet	12 May 1986 (aged 24)	1.90 m	40	107	(Spain) CB Torrevieja
5	LW	Pablo Portela	21 June 1980 (aged 30)	1.91 m	38	65	(Argentina) River Plate
6	CB	Diego Simonet	26 December 1989 (aged 21)	1.89 m	32	126	(Spain) CB Torrevieja
7		Andrés Kogovsek	7 January 1974 (aged 37)	1.90 m	163	338	(Argentina) SAG Ballester
8	P	Mariano Cánepa	7 May 1987 (aged 23)	1.88 m	30	45	(Argentina) SAG Ballester
9	RB	Leonardo Querin	17 April 1982 (aged 28)	1.97 m	61	139	(Italy) Bozen Loacker
10	RB	Federico Vieyra	21 July 1988 (aged 22)	1.94 m	41	130	(Spain) CB Torrevieja
11		Maximiliano Ferro	19 February 1985 (aged 25)	1.79 m	26	51	(Germany) Korschenbroich
12	GK	Fernando García	31 August 1981 (aged 29)	1.90 m	66	0	(Italy) Albatro Siracusa
13	CB	Juan Pablo Fernández	30 September 1988 (aged 22)	1.91 m	34	61	(Spain) SCDR Anaitasuna
14	LB	Agustín Vidal	8 July 1987 (aged 23)	1.94 m	35	91	(Spain) ADC Guadalajara
15	P	Gonzalo Carou	15 August 1979 (aged 31)	1.95 m	140	402	(Spain) Ademar León
17	RB	Damián Migueles	24 November 1983 (aged 27)	1.93 m	62	198	(France) OC Cesson

=== Chile ===
Head coach: (Chile) Fernando Luis Capurro

No.	Pos.	Name	Date of birth (age)	Height	App.	Goals	Club
1	GK	Felipe Barrientos Castillo	12 June 1984 (aged 26)	1.85 m	45	1	(Chile) Audax Italiano
3	P	Alfredo Valenzuela Dupree	13 February 1986 (aged 24)	1.83 m	30	45	Universidad de Chile
4	LB	Erwin Feuchtmann Perez	2 May 1990 (aged 20)	1.95 m	28	102	(Spain) Artepref Villa de Aranda
5	CB	Nicolas Jofre Alvarado	16 August 1984 (aged 26)	1.82 m	58	46	(Chile) UNAB
6		Marcelo Micaly Castillo	10 January 1989 (aged 22)	1.80 m	20	23	(Chile) Luterano
7	LB	Victor Donoso Andalaft	27 November 1990 (aged 20)	1.80 m	12	20	(Chile) FEN
8	cb	Eduardo Maltez Muñoz	12 January 1984 (aged 27)	1.80 m	45	88	(Chile) UNAB
10	CB	Emil Feuchtmann Perez	1 June 1983 (aged 27)	1.80 m	69	159	(Austria) SG Handball West Wien
11	RW	Felipe Maurin Garcia	31 August 1984 (aged 26)	1.90 m	49	92	(Chile) UNAB
12	GK	Rene Oliva Cifuentes	7 March 1987 (aged 23)	1.95 m	23	0	(Spain) BM Bailén
13	CB	Guillermo Araya Proboste	6 August 1985 (aged 25)	1.80 m	46	60	(Chile) UNAB
15		Rodolfo Cornejo Paredes	7 September 1983 (aged 27)	1.88 m	25	41	Universidad de Chile
16	GK	Luca Pacheco Nahuel	30 April 1991 (aged 19)	1.85 m	10	0	(Chile) UNAB
17	RB	Rodrigo Salinas Muñoz	25 February 1989 (aged 21)	1.86 m	34	78	(Spain) BM Huesca
18		Francisco Chacana Araya	7 March 1984 (aged 26)	1.90 m	33	89	(Chile) Wanderers
22	RW	Patricio Martinez Chavez	18 March 1979 (aged 31)	1.75 m	75	145	(Austria) SG Handball West Wien
31	P	Marco Antonio Oneto Zuñiga	3 June 1982 (aged 28)	2.04 m	69	122	(Spain) FC Barcelona

=== Poland ===
Head coach: (Poland) Bogdan Wenta

No.	Pos.	Name	Date of birth (age)	Height	App.	Goals	Club
1	GK	Sławomir Szmal	2 October 1978 (aged 32)	1.90 m	192	2	(Germany) Rhein-Neckar Löwen
2	CB	Bartłomiej Jaszka	16 June 1983 (aged 27)	1.84 m	91	141	(Germany) Füchse Berlin
4	RB	Patryk Kuchczyński	17 March 1983 (aged 27)	1.82 m	148	289	(Poland) Vive Targi Kielce
6	CB	Grzegorz Tkaczyk	22 December 1980 (aged 30)	1.94 m	129	466	(Germany) Rhein-Neckar Löwen
7	LW	Bartłomiej Tomczak	7 September 1985 (aged 25)	1.86 m	9	14	(Poland) Zagłębie Lubin
8	LB	Karol Bielecki	23 January 1982 (aged 28)	2.02 m	150	645	(Germany) Rhein-Neckar Löwen
9	P	Artur Siódmiak	7 October 1975 (aged 35)	1.92 m	122	100	(Germany) TuS Nettelstedt-Lübbecke
13	P	Bartosz Jurecki	31 January 1979 (aged 31)	1.93 m	133	423	(Germany) SC Magdeburg
14	RW	Mariusz Jurasik	4 May 1976 (aged 34)	1.92 m	190	675	(Poland) Vive Targi Kielce
15	LB	Michał Jurecki	27 October 1984 (aged 26)	2.02 m	105	232	(Poland) Vive Targi Kielce
16	GK	Piotr Wyszomirski	6 January 1988 (aged 23)	1.94 m	20	0	(Poland) Azoty-Puławy
18	P	Piotr Grabarczyk	31 October 1982 (aged 28)	2.00 m	40	32	(Poland) Vive Targi Kielce
19	LW	Tomasz Tłuczyński	19 April 1979 (aged 31)	1.82 m	97	389	(Germany) TuS Nettelstedt-Lübbecke
20	LB	Mariusz Jurkiewicz	3 February 1982 (aged 28)	1.96 m	79	123	(Spain) BM Ciudad Real
22	RB	Marcin Lijewski	21 September 1977 (aged 33)	1.97 m	226	657	(Germany) HSV Hamburg
32	LW	Tomasz Rosiński	24 February 1984 (aged 26)	1.98 m	6	6	(Poland) Vive Targi Kielce
41	RB	Mateusz Zaremba	27 October 1984 (aged 26)	1.92 m	18	33	(Poland) Vive Targi Kielce

=== Slovakia ===
Head coach: (Slovakia) Zoltán Heister

No.	Pos.	Name	Date of birth (age)	Height	App.	Goals	Club
1	GK	Teodor Paul	22 April 1987 (aged 23)	1.95 m	25	0	(Hungary) Ferencvárosi TC
4	CB	Peter Kukučka	20 July 1982 (aged 28)	1.88 m	79	286	(Switzerland) Kadetten Schaffhausen
5	LB	František Šulc	13 December 1978 (aged 32)	1.86 m	60	249	(Hungary) SC Pick Szeged
6	CB	Peter Tumidalský	19 October 1979 (aged 31)	2.00 m	55	87	(Slovakia) HT Tatran Prešov
7	CB	Juraj Nižňan	6 October 1983 (aged 27)	1.93 m	33	31	(Austria) HSG Bärnbach/Köflach
9	RB	Daniel Valo	7 May 1979 (aged 31)	2.03 m	120	491	(Germany) HSG Wetzlar
10	P	Michal Kopčo	27 January 1988 (aged 22)	2.00 m	34	55	(Slovakia) HT Tatran Prešov
12	GK	Richard Štochl	17 December 1975 (aged 35)	2.00 m	197	7	(France) Montpellier HB
13	CB	Ladislav Tarhai	24 February 1985 (aged 25)	1.95 m	23	56	(Switzerland) Pfadi Winterthur
14	P	Andrej Petro	26 January 1986 (aged 24)	1.99 m	46	70	(Hungary) Kecskeméti KSE
17	P	Martin Mazák	17 April 1984 (aged 26)	1.90 m	20	14	(Hungary) Ferencvárosi TC
20	RW	Tomáš Urban	17 September 1989 (aged 21)	1.85 m	34	57	(Hungary) Ferencvárosi TC
22	RW	Tomáš Straňovský	29 September 1980 (aged 30)	1.80 m	104	233	(Hungary) SC Pick Szeged
23	LW	Radoslav Antl	2 March 1978 (aged 32)	1.79 m	117	453	(Slovakia) HT Tatran Prešov
24	LW	Martin Straňovský	12 September 1985 (aged 25)	1.88 m	71	248	(Spain) CB Ademar León
30	GK	Martin Pramuk	14 March 1976 (aged 34)	1.93 m	36	0	(Switzerland) Pfadi Winterthur

=== South Korea ===
Head coach: (South Korea) Cho Young-Shin

No.	Pos.	Name	Date of birth (age)	Height	App.	Goals	Club
1	GK	Lee Chang-woo	12 May 1983 (aged 27)	1.88 m	24	0	(South Korea) Korean Army
2	CB	Jeong Yi-kyeong	28 February 1985 (aged 25)	1.88 m	39	63	(South Korea) Doosan Bears
3		Sim Jae-bok	27 November 1987 (aged 23)	1.79 m	17	18	(South Korea) IUDC
6		Eom Hyo-won	12 December 1986 (aged 24)	1.82 m	3	4	(South Korea) IUDC
7	RB	Jung Su-young	17 October 1985 (aged 25)	1.84 m	37	71	(South Korea) HC Korosa
8	P	Park Jung-geu	2 November 1983 (aged 27)	1.92 m	42	68	(South Korea) Doosan Bears
9		Kim Hwan-sung	2 March 1983 (aged 27)	1.80 m	9	10	(South Korea) IUDC
10	P	Park Chan-yong	1 January 1980 (aged 31)	1.90 m	13	8	(South Korea) IUDC
11		Lim Duk-jun	30 August 1980 (aged 30)	1.86 m	8	5	(South Korea) Doosan Bears
12	GK	Park Chan-young	26 January 1983 (aged 27)	1.90 m	30	0	(South Korea) Doosan Bears
13	LB	Lee Jae-woo	28 September 1979 (aged 31)	1.81 m	122	126	(South Korea) Doosan Bears
14		Oh Yun-suk	1 March 1984 (aged 26)	1.96 m	47	38	(South Korea) Doosan Bears
16	GK	Lee Dong-myung	15 April 1983 (aged 27)	1.90 m	13	0	(South Korea) Doosan Bears
17		Yu Dong-geun	3 September 1985 (aged 25)	1.81 m	16	29	(South Korea) IUDC
20	LB	Yoon Ci-yoel	5 May 1984 (aged 26)	1.89 m	13	22	(South Korea) Chungnam
21	RW	Na Seung-do	27 January 1990 (aged 20)	1.92 m	2	5	(South Korea) Wonkwang University

=== Sweden ===
Head coach: (Sweden) Staffan Olsson

No.	Pos.	Name	Date of birth (age)	Height	App.	Goals	Club
1	GK	Mattias Andersson	29 March 1978 (aged 32)	1.86 m	54	0	(Germany) TV Grosswallstadt
3	P	Mattias Gustafsson	11 July 1978 (aged 32)	1.93 m	69	120	(Germany) TuS Nettelstedt-Lübbecke
5	RB	Kim Andersson	21 August 1982 (aged 28)	2.00 m	164	614	(Germany) THW Kiel
6	LW	Jonas Källman	17 June 1981 (aged 29)	2.00 m	140	426	(Spain) BM Ciudad Real
7	P	Magnus Jernemyr	18 July 1976 (aged 34)	2.00 m	56	5	(Spain) FC Barcelona
8	CB	Lukas Karlsson	21 May 1982 (aged 28)	1.78 m	44	106	(Denmark) KIF Kolding
9	RW	Jan Lennartsson	22 September 1981 (aged 29)	1.86 m	110	265	(Denmark) AaB Håndbold
10	RW	Niclas Ekberg	23 December 1988 (aged 22)	1.91 m	27	101	(Denmark) AG København
11	CB	Dalibor Doder	24 May 1979 (aged 31)	1.82 m	105	317	(Germany) GWD Minden
14	P	Robert Arrhenius	14 May 1979 (aged 31)	1.95 m	176	349	(Germany) THW Kiel
15	CB	Jonas Larholm	3 June 1982 (aged 28)	1.93 m	145	477	(Denmark) AaB Håndbold
17	RB	Oscar Carlén	11 May 1988 (aged 22)	1.93 m	64	155	(Germany) SG Flensburg-Handewitt
18	LB	Tobias Karlsson	4 June 1987 (aged 23)	1.96 m	71	52	(Germany) SG Flensburg-Handewitt
22	GK	Johan Sjöstrand	26 February 1987 (aged 23)	1.95 m	24	0	(Spain) FC Barcelona
24	LW	Fredrik Petersen	23 August 1983 (aged 27)	1.88 m	39	111	(Denmark) Bjerringbro-Silkeborg
25	LB	Kim Ekdahl Du Rietz	27 March 1989 (aged 21)	1.96 m	19	28	(Sweden) Lugi HF

== Statistics ==
=== Coaches representation by country ===
Coaches in bold represent their own country.

Nº	Country	Coaches
3	Sweden	Magnus Andersson (Austria), Robert Hedin (Norway), **Staffan Olsson**
2	France	**Claude Onesta**, Alain Portes (Tunisia)
2	Germany	**Heiner Brand**, Jörn-Uwe Lommel (Egypt)
2	Spain	Javier Costa (Brazil), **Valero Rivera**
1	Algeria	**Salah Bouchekriou**
1	Argentina	**Eduardo Gallardo**
1	Australia	**Taip Ramadani**
1	Bahrain	**Bader Mirza**
1	Chile	**Fernando Capurro**
1	Croatia	**Slavko Goluža**
1	Denmark	**Ulrik Wilbek**
1	Hungary	**Lajos Mocsai**
1	Iceland	**Guðmundur Guðmundsson**
1	Japan	**Kiyoharu Sakamaki**
1	Poland	**Bogdan Wenta**
1	Romania	**Vasile Stîngă**
1	Serbia	**Veselin Vuković**
1	Slovakia	**Zoltán Heister**
1	South Korea	**Cho Young-shin**
