= Handball at the 2011 Pan American Games – Men's team rosters =

== Group A ==
=== Brazil ===
Head coach:

| No. | Pos. | Player | Date of birth (age) | Caps | Goals | Club |
|---|---|---|---|---|---|---|
| | | Leonardo Bortolini | | | | |
| | | Gustavo Cardoso | | | | |
| | | Fabio Chiuffa | | | | |
| | | Bruno De Santana | | | | |
| | | Marcos Dos Santos | | | | |
| | | Thiagus dos Santos | | | | |
| | | Jaqson Kojoroski | | | | |
| | | Fernando Pacheco Filho | | | | |
| | | Gil Pires | | | | |
| | | Felipe Ribeiro | | | | |
| | | Renato Rui | | | | |
| | | Maik Santos | | | | |
| | | Ales Silva | | | | |
| | | Henrique Teixeira | | | | |
| | | Vinícius Teixeira | | | | |

=== Canada ===
Head coach:

| No. | Pos. | Player | Date of birth (age) | Caps | Goals | Club |
|---|---|---|---|---|---|---|
| | | Zoran Basdar | | | | |
| | | Douglas Bennett | | | | |
| | | Alexis Bertrand | | | | |
| | | Geoffroy Bessette | | | | |
| | | Daniel Devlin | | | | |
| | | Niklas Etter | | | | |
| | | Sebastien Fyfe | | | | |
| | | Sylvain Gaudet | | | | |
| | | Maxime Godin | | | | |
| | | Ryan Homsy | | | | |
| | | Jonathan Leduc | | | | |
| | | Sean Phillips | | | | |
| | | Xavier Roesch | | | | |
| | | Danny St-Laurent | | | | |
| | | Mark Walder | | | | |

=== Chile ===
Head coach:

| No. | Pos. | Player | Date of birth (age) | Caps | Goals | Club |
|---|---|---|---|---|---|---|
| | | Guillermo Araya | | | | |
| | | Felipe Barrientos | | | | |
| | | Rodolfo Cornejo | | | | |
| | | Rodrigo Diaz | | | | |
| | | Emil Feuchtmann | | | | |
| | | Erwin Feuchtmann | | | | |
| | | Harald Feuchtmann | | | | |
| | | Nicolas Jofre | | | | |
| | | Patricio Martinez | | | | |
| | | Felipe Maurin | | | | |
| | | Rene Oliva | | | | |
| | | Marco Oneto | | | | |
| | | Esteban Salinas | | | | |
| | | Rodrigo Salinas | | | | |
| | | Alfredo Valenzuela | | | | |

=== Venezuela ===
Head coach:

| No. | Pos. | Player | Date of birth (age) | Caps | Goals | Club |
|---|---|---|---|---|---|---|
| | | Ali Barranco | | | | |
| | | Enmanuel Godoy | | | | |
| | | Jesus Guarecuco | | | | |
| | | Victor Lopez | | | | |
| | | Arturo Martinez | | | | |
| | | Jhonny Peñaloza | | | | |
| | | Ivan Perez | | | | |
| | | Eduardo Rodriguez | | | | |
| | | Raul Rodriguez | | | | |
| | | Drubil Silva | | | | |
| | | Christofer Timaure | | | | |
| | | Ronal Timaure | | | | |
| | | Emilio Tovar | | | | |
| | | Juan Villalobos | | | | |
| | | Kelwing Zambrano | | | | |

== Group B ==
=== Argentina ===
Head coach:

| No. | Pos. | Player | Date of birth (age) | Caps | Goals | Club |
|---|---|---|---|---|---|---|
| | | Gonzalo Carou | | | | |
| | | Federico Fernandez | | | | |
| | | Juan Fernandez | | | | |
| | | Fernando Garcia | | | | |
| | | Andrés Kogovsek | | | | |
| | | Damián Migueles | | | | |
| | | Federico Pizarro | | | | |
| | | Cristian Plati | | | | |
| | | Pablo Portela | | | | |
| | | Leonardo Querin | | | | |
| | | Matías Schulz | | | | |
| | | Diego Simonet | | | | |
| | | Sebastián Simonet | | | | |
| | | Juan Vidal | | | | |
| | | Federico Vieyra | | | | |

=== Dominican Republic ===
Head coach:

| No. | Pos. | Player | Date of birth (age) | Caps | Goals | Club |
|---|---|---|---|---|---|---|
| | | Julio Almeida Acosta | | | | |
| | | Franalbert Aybar Rivas | | | | |
| | | Michael Bravet | | | | |
| | | Domingo Caraballo | | | | |
| | | Kelvin De Leon Castro | | | | |
| | | Leony De Leon Castro | | | | |
| | | Gerardo Diaz | | | | |
| | | Elvin Fis Carpio | | | | |
| | | Pablo Jacobo Rojas | | | | |
| | | Dioris Mateo Conce | | | | |
| | | Carlos Mirabal | | | | |
| | | Luis San Late | | | | |
| | | Juan Tapia Bido | | | | |
| | | Erinson Tavarez Perez | | | | |
| | | Luis Taveras Lorenzo | | | | |

=== Mexico ===
Head coach:

| No. | Pos. | Player | Date of birth (age) | Caps | Goals | Club |
|---|---|---|---|---|---|---|
| | | Marcial Acuña | | | | |
| | | Hector Aguirre | | | | |
| | | Alejandro Almaraz | | | | |
| | | Christian Bermudez | | | | |
| | | Victor Bernal | | | | |
| | | Emiliano Contreras | | | | |
| | | Miguel Contreras | | | | |
| | | Jose Garcia | | | | |
| | | Jorge Hurtado | | | | |
| | | Moises Luna | | | | |
| | | Adrian Romero | | | | |
| | | Arturo Rosas | | | | |
| | | Jose Sillas | | | | |
| | | Jose Valenzuela | | | | |
| | | Alan Villalobos | | | | |

=== United States ===
The team that will be representing the United States in the men's tournament is as follows:

USA Men's National Handball Team roster
Players
Coaches

| Pos. | # | Name | Age | Ht. | Weight | Club |
|---|---|---|---|---|---|---|---|
| G | | Caparelli, Daniel () | 37 – 24 September 1974 | 6 ft 4 in (1.93 m) | – | NYAC | (United States) |
| G | | Thompson, David | 31 – 15 March 1980 | – | – | ATH United | (United States) |
| RB | | Axelsson, Martin Clemons () | 30 – 21 October 1980 | 6 ft 2 in (1.88 m) | – | Lilestrom | (Norway) |
| RW | | Badr, Karim | 29 – 20 February 1982 | – | – | GSC | (Egypt) |
| RW | | Chun, Carsen () | 24 – 21 June 1987 | 5 ft 9 in (1.75 m) | – | SG Nußloch / USAFA Team Handball | (Germany) |
| RB | | El Zoghby, Adam () | 25 – 13 April 1986 | 6 ft 3 in (1.91 m) | – | Al-Ahly | (Egypt) |
| P | | Fithian, Jordan () | 25 – 13 December 1985 | 6 ft 6 in (1.98 m) | – | TV Gelnhausen | (Germany) |
| LB | | Hines, Gary () | 27 – 21 March 1984 | 5 ft 11 in (1.8 m) | – | HSC Bad Neustadt | (Germany) |
| LW | | Key, Justin () | 24 – 6 March 1987 | 6 ft 1 in (1.85 m) | – | West Point Team Handball | (United States) |
| P | | Kimmich, Danny | 26 – 5 September 1985 | – | – | TV Ramstein / USAFA Team Handball | (Germany) |
| CB | | Lamour, Joe | 28 – 7 August 1983 | – | – | ATH United | (United States) |
| CB | | Ortega, Mark (C, ) | 33 – 25 July 1978 | 5 ft 11 in (1.8 m) | – | CDE Sinfin | (Spain) |
| LW | | Self, Hans | 24 – 13 September 1987 | – | – | SG Bruchköbel | (Germany) |
| LB | | Srsen, Domagoj | 20 – 31 December 1990 | – | – | RK Bjelovar | (Croatia) |
| CB | | Williams, Michael | 18 – 7 April 1993 | – | – | SG Flensburg | (Germany) |
| G | | Goodreau, Gabriel (alt., ) | - | 6 ft 2 in (1.88 m) | – | Los Angeles THC | (United States) |
| G | | Ignjatovic, Ivan (alt., ) | - | 6 ft 2 in (1.88 m) | – | New York City THC | (United States) |
| CB | | Acevedo, Guillermo (alt.) | - | – | – |
| RW | | Mullin, Alex (alt.) | - | – | – |

Head coach

- (United States) Darrick Heath

Assistant coach

- (United States) Wade Sutton

Team Leader

- (United States) Jim Thome

Legend

- Club denotes current club;
  nationality is of (first) club listed
- alt. denotes alternates
- Positions:
  - G: Goalkeeper
  - P: Pivot
  - CB: Centre Back
  - LW: Left Wing
  - RW: Right Wing
  - LB: Left Back
  - RB: Right Back
