= 2012 Pan American Men's Handball Championship =

PanAmericano 2012

Tournament details
- Host country: Argentina
- Venue: 1 (in 1 host city)
- Dates: 18–24 June
- Teams: 9 (from 1 confederation)

Final positions
- Champions: Argentina (5th title)
- Runners-up: Brazil
- Third place: Chile
- Fourth place: Uruguay

Tournament statistics
- Matches played: 23
- Goals scored: 1,227 (53.35 per match)
- Top scorers: (Greenland) Minik Dahl Høegh (49 goals)

Awards
- Best player: (Chile) Marco Oneto

The 2012 Pan American Handball Championship, also called PanAmericano 2012, was the 15th official competition for senior men's national handball teams of North, Center, Caribbean and South America. It was held from 18 to 24 June 2012 in Burzaco, Almirante Brown Partido, Argentina. It also acted as the qualifying competition for the 2013 World Men's Handball Championship, securing three vacancies for the World Championship. A decision was announced during the 2011 Pan American Games that the tournament will consist of 12 teams. As the winner of those Pan American Games, Argentina was selected as the host.

== Participating teams ==
The participating nations have been announced on 15 May 2012.

Group A	Group B
Argentina; Chile; Greenland; United States; Venezuela	Brazil; ~~Dominican Republic~~; Mexico; Paraguay; Uruguay

The Dominican Republic team withdrew after the draw, reportedly for financial reasons.

== Preliminary round ==
Team advances to the Semifinals
Team will play in Fifth place game
Team will play in Placement round

All times are local (UTC−3)

=== Group A ===
Team	Pld	W	D	L	GF	GA	GD	Pts
Argentina (H)	4	3	1	0	127	69	+58	7
Chile	4	3	1	0	123	95	+28	7
Greenland	4	2	0	2	123	117	+6	4
United States	4	1	0	3	102	132	−30	2
Venezuela	4	0	0	4	103	165	−62	0

(H) Hosts

18 June 2012; 18:00	Argentina	33–13	United States	Polideportivo de Almirante Brown, Burzaco; Attendance: 700
18 June 2012; 18:00	Kogovsek 7	(18–4)	Hines, Jackson 3	Polideportivo de Almirante Brown, Burzaco; Attendance: 700
18 June 2012; 18:00	2× (yellow card) 1× (suspension)	Report	3× (yellow card) 4× (suspension)	Polideportivo de Almirante Brown, Burzaco; Attendance: 700

18 June 2012; 20:00	Chile	31–28	Greenland	Polideportivo de Almirante Brown, Burzaco
18 June 2012; 20:00	Em. Feuchtmann 7	(14–14)	Dahl Høegh 10	Polideportivo de Almirante Brown, Burzaco
18 June 2012; 20:00	3× (yellow card) 4× (suspension)	Report	2× (yellow card) 3× (suspension)	Polideportivo de Almirante Brown, Burzaco

19 June 2012; 18:00	Chile	34–25	Venezuela	Polideportivo de Almirante Brown, Burzaco; Attendance: 300
19 June 2012; 18:00	Er. Feuchtmann 8	(20–13)	Godoy 9	Polideportivo de Almirante Brown, Burzaco; Attendance: 300
19 June 2012; 18:00	3× (yellow card) 1× (suspension)	Report	2× (yellow card) 4× (suspension) 1× (red card)	Polideportivo de Almirante Brown, Burzaco; Attendance: 300

19 June 2012; 21:00	Greenland	18–24	Argentina	Polideportivo de Almirante Brown, Burzaco; Attendance: 3,000
19 June 2012; 21:00	Dahl Høegh 7	(8–10)	Pizarro 5	Polideportivo de Almirante Brown, Burzaco; Attendance: 3,000
19 June 2012; 21:00	4× (yellow card) 4× (suspension)	Report	3× (yellow card) 6× (suspension)	Polideportivo de Almirante Brown, Burzaco; Attendance: 3,000

20 June 2012; 19:00	United States	43–28	Venezuela	Polideportivo de Almirante Brown, Burzaco; Attendance: 2,000
20 June 2012; 19:00	Andjelic 10	(24–16)	Peñaloza 11	Polideportivo de Almirante Brown, Burzaco; Attendance: 2,000
20 June 2012; 19:00	3× (yellow card) 6× (suspension) 1× (red card)	Report	3× (yellow card) 1× (suspension)	Polideportivo de Almirante Brown, Burzaco; Attendance: 2,000

20 June 2012; 21:00	Argentina	23–23	Chile	Polideportivo de Almirante Brown, Burzaco; Attendance: 4,000
20 June 2012; 21:00	Simonet 6	(10–13)	Oneto 6	Polideportivo de Almirante Brown, Burzaco; Attendance: 4,000
20 June 2012; 21:00	3× (yellow card) 6× (suspension)	Report	3× (yellow card) 3× (suspension)	Polideportivo de Almirante Brown, Burzaco; Attendance: 4,000

21 June 2012; 18:00	Argentina	47–15	Venezuela	Polideportivo de Almirante Brown, Burzaco; Attendance: 1,500
21 June 2012; 18:00	Pizarro 9	(27–7)	Timaure, Rojas Vera 3	Polideportivo de Almirante Brown, Burzaco; Attendance: 1,500
21 June 2012; 18:00	2× (yellow card) 1× (suspension)	Report	2× (yellow card) 5× (suspension)	Polideportivo de Almirante Brown, Burzaco; Attendance: 1,500

21 June 2012; 20:00	United States	27–36	Greenland	Polideportivo de Almirante Brown, Burzaco
21 June 2012; 20:00	Axelsson 9	(15–15)	Dahl Høegh 16	Polideportivo de Almirante Brown, Burzaco
21 June 2012; 20:00	3× (yellow card) 4× (suspension)	Report	3× (yellow card) 4× (suspension)	Polideportivo de Almirante Brown, Burzaco

22 June 2012; 16:00	Greenland	41–35	Venezuela	Polideportivo de Almirante Brown, Burzaco; Attendance: 1,500
22 June 2012; 16:00	Dahl Høegh 9	(20–14)	Timaure 9	Polideportivo de Almirante Brown, Burzaco; Attendance: 1,500
22 June 2012; 16:00	3× (yellow card) 2× (suspension)	Report	3× (yellow card) 2× (suspension)	Polideportivo de Almirante Brown, Burzaco; Attendance: 1,500

22 June 2012; 18:00	United States	19–35	Chile	Polideportivo de Almirante Brown, Burzaco; Attendance: 400
22 June 2012; 18:00	Axelsson 8	(7–22)	H. Feuchtmann 8	Polideportivo de Almirante Brown, Burzaco; Attendance: 400
22 June 2012; 18:00	3× (yellow card) 8× (suspension) 1× (red card)	Report	3× (yellow card) 2× (suspension)	Polideportivo de Almirante Brown, Burzaco; Attendance: 400

=== Group B ===
Team	Pld	W	D	L	GF	GA	GD	Pts
Brazil	3	3	0	0	118	39	+79	6
Uruguay	3	2	0	1	67	71	−4	4
Paraguay	3	1	0	2	49	80	−31	2
Mexico	3	0	0	3	41	85	−44	0

19 June 2012; 14:00	Paraguay	11–39	Brazil	Polideportivo de Almirante Brown, Burzaco
19 June 2012; 14:00	three players 2	(4–23)	Pires 10	Polideportivo de Almirante Brown, Burzaco
19 June 2012; 14:00	3× (yellow card) 1× (suspension)	Report	3× (yellow card) 1× (suspension)	Polideportivo de Almirante Brown, Burzaco

19 June 2012; 16:00	Uruguay	26–13	Mexico	Polideportivo de Almirante Brown, Burzaco
19 June 2012; 16:00	Ansolabehere, Cancio 4	(15–4)	Figueroa 3	Polideportivo de Almirante Brown, Burzaco
19 June 2012; 16:00	2× (yellow card) 2× (suspension)	Report	2× (yellow card) 4× (suspension)	Polideportivo de Almirante Brown, Burzaco

20 June 2012; 15:00	Paraguay	16–25	Uruguay	Polideportivo de Almirante Brown, Burzaco
20 June 2012; 15:00	Mendoza 7	(10–12)	Gamis 4	Polideportivo de Almirante Brown, Burzaco
20 June 2012; 15:00	2× (yellow card) 5× (suspension)	Report	3× (yellow card) 5× (suspension)	Polideportivo de Almirante Brown, Burzaco

20 June 2012; 17:00	Mexico	12–37	Brazil	Polideportivo de Almirante Brown, Burzaco
20 June 2012; 17:00	Figueroa 3	(8–14)	Cândido 8	Polideportivo de Almirante Brown, Burzaco
20 June 2012; 17:00	3× (yellow card) 5× (suspension)	Report	3× (yellow card) 2× (suspension)	Polideportivo de Almirante Brown, Burzaco

21 June 2012; 14:00	Mexico	16–22	Paraguay	Polideportivo de Almirante Brown, Burzaco; Attendance: 3,000
21 June 2012; 14:00	Aguirre 5	(9–13)	three players 4	Polideportivo de Almirante Brown, Burzaco; Attendance: 3,000
21 June 2012; 14:00	3× (yellow card) 2× (suspension)	Report	3× (yellow card) 3× (suspension)	Polideportivo de Almirante Brown, Burzaco; Attendance: 3,000

21 June 2012; 16:00	Brazil	42–16	Uruguay	Polideportivo de Almirante Brown, Burzaco; Attendance: 2,000
21 June 2012; 16:00	Teixeira 8	(19–9)	Ansolabehere 5	Polideportivo de Almirante Brown, Burzaco; Attendance: 2,000
21 June 2012; 16:00	3× (yellow card) 2× (suspension)	Report	3× (yellow card) 3× (suspension)	Polideportivo de Almirante Brown, Burzaco; Attendance: 2,000

== Placement round ==
Points gained in the preliminary round against teams from the same group were carried over.

Pos	Team	Pld	W	D	L	GF	GA	GD	Pts
7	United States	2	2	0	0	76	45	+31	4
8	Venezuela	2	1	0	1	56	66	−10	2
9	Mexico	2	0	0	2	40	61	−21	0

Source: Todor66
Rules for classification: 1) points; 2) head-to-head points; 3) head-to-head goal difference; 4) head-to-head number of goals scored; 5) goal difference.

23 June 2012; 17:00	Venezuela	28–23	Mexico	Polideportivo de Almirante Brown, Burzaco; Attendance: 500
23 June 2012; 17:00	Rodriguez 6	(12–8)	Aguirre 7	Polideportivo de Almirante Brown, Burzaco; Attendance: 500
23 June 2012; 17:00	2× (yellow card) 4× (suspension) 1× (red card)	Report	3× (yellow card) 6× (suspension)	Polideportivo de Almirante Brown, Burzaco; Attendance: 500

24 June 2012; 09:00	United States	33–17	Mexico	Polideportivo de Almirante Brown, Burzaco; Attendance: 3,000
24 June 2012; 09:00	three players 5	(15–10)	Morales Diaz, Contreras 3	Polideportivo de Almirante Brown, Burzaco; Attendance: 3,000
24 June 2012; 09:00	3× (yellow card) 3× (suspension)	Report	2× (yellow card) 2× (suspension)	Polideportivo de Almirante Brown, Burzaco; Attendance: 3,000

== Knockout stage ==
=== Bracket ===
Semifinals
23 June 2012
Argentina	28
Uruguay	13
23 June 2012
Chile	33
Brazil	35

Final
24 June 2012
Argentina	22
Brazil	21
Third place
24 June 2012
Uruguay	27
Chile	37

=== Semifinals ===
23 June 2012; 13:00	Argentina	28–13	Uruguay	Polideportivo de Almirante Brown, Burzaco
23 June 2012; 13:00	Riccobelli 5	(14–7)	Ansolabehere 3	Polideportivo de Almirante Brown, Burzaco
23 June 2012; 13:00	3× (yellow card) 2× (suspension)	Report	4× (yellow card) 4× (suspension)	Polideportivo de Almirante Brown, Burzaco

23 June 2012; 15:00	Brazil	35–33	Chile	Polideportivo de Almirante Brown, Burzaco; Attendance: 2,000
23 June 2012; 15:00	Ribeiro 6	(20–14)	Salinas 7	Polideportivo de Almirante Brown, Burzaco; Attendance: 2,000
23 June 2012; 15:00	3× (yellow card) 2× (suspension)	Report	2× (yellow card) 2× (suspension)	Polideportivo de Almirante Brown, Burzaco; Attendance: 2,000

=== Fifth place game ===
23 June 2012; 17:00	Greenland	38–19	Paraguay	Polideportivo de Almirante Brown, Burzaco
23 June 2012; 17:00	Dahl Høegh 7	(20–11)	Mendoza, Mendoza 5	Polideportivo de Almirante Brown, Burzaco
23 June 2012; 17:00	3× (yellow card) 2× (suspension)	Report	3× (yellow card) 3× (suspension)	Polideportivo de Almirante Brown, Burzaco

=== Third place game ===
24 June 2012; 13:00	Uruguay	27–37	Chile	Polideportivo de Almirante Brown, Burzaco
24 June 2012; 13:00	Ansolabehere 7	(12–16)	Feuchtmann 10	Polideportivo de Almirante Brown, Burzaco
24 June 2012; 13:00	3× (yellow card) 7× (suspension) 1× (red card)	Report	3× (yellow card) 7× (suspension) 1× (red card)	Polideportivo de Almirante Brown, Burzaco

=== Final ===
24 June 2012; 11:00	Argentina	22–21	Brazil	Polideportivo de Almirante Brown, Burzaco; Attendance: 4,200
24 June 2012; 11:00	Simonet 6	(12–12)	Ribeiro 9	Polideportivo de Almirante Brown, Burzaco; Attendance: 4,200
24 June 2012; 11:00	2× (yellow card) 1× (suspension) 1× (red card)	Report	3× (yellow card) 1× (suspension)	Polideportivo de Almirante Brown, Burzaco; Attendance: 4,200

== Final ranking ==
Gold medal	Argentina
Silver medal	Brazil
Bronze medal	Chile
4	Uruguay
5	Greenland
6	Paraguay
7	United States
8	Venezuela
9	Mexico

Team advanced to the 2013 World Men's Handball Championship

=== Best team ===
- Goalkeeper: (Argentina) Matías Schulz
- Right wing: (Argentina) Andrés Kogovsek
- Right back: (Chile) Rodrigo Salinas
- Central back: (Argentina) Sebastián Simonet
- Left back: (Greenland) Minik Dahl Høegh
- Left wing: (Brazil) Felipe Borges
- Pivot: (Chile) Marco Oneto
