= Handball at the 2011 Pan American Games – Men's tournament =

Men's handball tournament at the 2011 Pan American Games
- Venue: San Rafael Gymnasium
- Dates: October 16 – October 24
- Competitors: 120 from 8 nations

Medalists
Gold medal	Argentina	Argentina
Silver medal	Brazil	Brazil
Bronze medal	Chile	Chile

The men's tournament of handball at the 2011 Pan American Games in Guadalajara, Mexico, began on October 16 and ended on October 24. All games were held at the San Rafael Gymnasium. The defending champions were Brazil, who won the title on home court. Argentina, the winner of the competition, qualified for the 2012 Summer Olympics in London, Great Britain.

== Teams ==
=== Qualification ===
A National Olympic Committee may enter one men's team for the handball competition. Mexico, the host nation along with seven other countries qualified through regional competitions.

Event	Date	Location	Vacancies	Qualified
Host Nation	–	–	1	Mexico
2010 South American Games	March 20–30, 2010	(Colombia) Medellín	3	Brazil; Argentina; Chile
2010 Central American and Caribbean Games	July 18–25, 2010	(Puerto Rico) Mayagüez	2	Dominican Republic; Venezuela
Canada versus United States Series	December 21, 23, 2010	(United States) Lake Placid (Canada) La Prairie	1	Canada
Last Chance Qualifying Tournament	June 3–5, 2011	Guatemala City	1	United States
TOTAL			8	

Canada versus United States Series

December 21; 6:00	United States	25–21	Canada	Lake Placid Olympic Training Center, Lake Placid; Attendance: 250; Referees: Perez (PUR), Guzman (PUR)
December 21; 6:00	Key 5		Alexis Bertrand 6	Lake Placid Olympic Training Center, Lake Placid; Attendance: 250; Referees: Perez (PUR), Guzman (PUR)

December 23; 7:30	Canada	30–23 (ET)	United States	La Magdeleine School, La Prairie; Attendance: 400; Referees: Perez (PUR), Guzman (PUR)
December 23; 7:30	Etter 8		Hines 9	La Magdeleine School, La Prairie; Attendance: 400; Referees: Perez (PUR), Guzman (PUR)

Canada won 51–48 on aggregate and qualified for the games.

- The second game at the end of regulation was a 25–21 advantage for Canada, thus the game went to overtime.

Last chance qualifying tournament

June 3	Guatemala	12–20	Uruguay	Domo Polideportivo, Guatemala City

June 4	United States	23–23	Uruguay	Domo Polideportivo, Guatemala City

June 5	United States	38–24	Guatemala	Domo Polideportivo, Guatemala City

- USA advance to the Pan American Games with a better goal differential. Puerto Rico withdrew from participating in the tournament.

=== Squads ===
At the start of tournament, all eight participating countries had 15 players on their rosters. Final squads for the tournament were due on September 14, 2011, a month before the start of 2011 Pan American Games.

- Argentina
- Brazil
- Canada
- Chile
- Dominican Republic
- Mexico
- United States
- Venezuela

== Format ==
- Eight teams are split into 2 preliminary round groups of 4 teams each. The top 2 teams from each group qualify for the knockout stage.
- The third and fourth placed teams will play the fifth to eight bracket.
- In the semifinals, the matchups are as follows: A1 vs. B2 and B1 vs. A2
- The winning teams from the semifinals play for the gold medal. The losing teams compete for the bronze medal.

Ties are broken via the following the criteria, with the first option used first, all the way down to the last option:

1. Head to head results.
2. Goal difference in the matches between the teams concerned.
3. Greater number of plus goals in the matches between the teams concerned.

== Draw ==
The draw for the tournament was held at the offices of the Organising Committee (COPAG) for the Games in Guadalajara on July 21 at 16:00 local time.

The competing are drawn to each group by couples. The first team selected randomly in the draw goes to group A and the second to Group B. The pots are based on the performance of national teams in both previous games and their standings in their respective regional competitions.

Pot 1	Pot 2	Pot 3	Pot 4
Brazil; Argentina	Chile; Dominican Republic	Canada; Mexico	Venezuela; United States

== Preliminary round ==
All times are local (UTC−5).

=== Group A ===
Pos	Team	Pld	W	D	L	GF	GA	GD	Pts	Qualification
1	Brazil	3	3	0	0	119	54	+65	6	Semifinals
2	Chile	3	2	0	1	101	89	+12	4	Semifinals
3	Canada	3	1	0	2	70	113	−43	2	5th–8th place semifinals
4	Venezuela	3	0	0	3	68	102	−34	0	5th–8th place semifinals

Source: Guadalajara 2011
Rules for classification: 1) points; 2) head-to-head points; 3) head-to-head goal difference; 4) head-to-head goals scored; 5) goal difference; 6) goals scored; 7) draw.

October 16; 13:00	Brazil	46–17	Canada	San Rafael Gymnasium; Referees: González, Prieto (URU)
October 16; 13:00	Ruy, V. Teixeira 7	(19–7)	Godin 4	San Rafael Gymnasium; Referees: González, Prieto (URU)
October 16; 13:00	3× (yellow card) 1× (suspension)	Report	2× (yellow card) 3× (suspension)	San Rafael Gymnasium; Referees: González, Prieto (URU)

October 16; 15:00	Chile	37–28	Venezuela	San Rafael Gymnasium; Referees: Pérez, Guzmán (PUR)
October 16; 15:00	Em. Feuchtmann 8	(19–12)	Peñaloza 6	San Rafael Gymnasium; Referees: Pérez, Guzmán (PUR)
October 16; 15:00	3× (yellow card) 7× (suspension)	Report	1× (yellow card) 8× (suspension) 2× (red card)	San Rafael Gymnasium; Referees: Pérez, Guzmán (PUR)

October 18; 13:00	Canada	25–42	Chile	San Rafael Gymnasium; Referees: Marina, Minore (ARG)
October 18; 13:00	Bertrand, Bessette 5	(11–19)	Em. Feuchtmann, R. Salinas 8	San Rafael Gymnasium; Referees: Marina, Minore (ARG)
October 18; 13:00	2× (yellow card) 8× (suspension) 1× (red card)	Report	3× (yellow card) 7× (suspension)	San Rafael Gymnasium; Referees: Marina, Minore (ARG)

October 18; 20:00	Venezuela	15–37	Brazil	San Rafael Gymnasium; Referees: Raluy, Sabroso (ESP)
October 18; 20:00	Godoy, Peñaloza 3	(8–19)	Ruy 7	San Rafael Gymnasium; Referees: Raluy, Sabroso (ESP)
October 18; 20:00	3× (yellow card) 3× (suspension)	Report	3× (yellow card) 5× (suspension)	San Rafael Gymnasium; Referees: Raluy, Sabroso (ESP)

October 20; 13:00	Brazil	36–22	Chile	San Rafael Gymnasium; Referees: González, Prieto (URU)
October 20; 13:00	Borges 10	(15–9)	Em. Feuchtmann, R. Salinas 5	San Rafael Gymnasium; Referees: González, Prieto (URU)
October 20; 13:00	3× (yellow card) 8× (suspension)	Report	3× (yellow card) 5× (suspension)	San Rafael Gymnasium; Referees: González, Prieto (URU)

October 20; 15:00	Canada	28–25	Venezuela	San Rafael Gymnasium; Referees: De Souza, Paz (BRA)
October 20; 15:00	Etter 10	(12–10)	Pérez 6	San Rafael Gymnasium; Referees: De Souza, Paz (BRA)
October 20; 15:00		Report		San Rafael Gymnasium; Referees: De Souza, Paz (BRA)

=== Group B ===
Pos	Team	Pld	W	D	L	GF	GA	GD	Pts	Qualification
1	Argentina	3	3	0	0	95	55	+40	6	Semifinals
2	Dominican Republic	3	2	0	1	77	79	−2	4	Semifinals
3	Mexico (H)	3	1	0	2	78	93	−15	2	5th–8th place semifinals
4	United States	3	0	0	3	73	96	−23	0	5th–8th place semifinals

Source: Guadalajara 2011
Rules for classification: 1) points; 2) head-to-head points; 3) head-to-head goal difference; 4) head-to-head goals scored; 5) goal difference; 6) goals scored; 7) draw.
(H) Hosts

October 16; 18:00	Dominican Republic	27–22	United States	San Rafael Gymnasium; Referees: Pellerin, Martin (CAN)
October 16; 18:00	K. de León, Mirabal 7	(11–11)	Clemons Axelsson 8	San Rafael Gymnasium; Referees: Pellerin, Martin (CAN)
October 16; 18:00	3× (yellow card) 7× (suspension)	Report	3× (yellow card) 6× (suspension)	San Rafael Gymnasium; Referees: Pellerin, Martin (CAN)

October 16; 20:00	Argentina	31–16	Mexico	San Rafael Gymnasium; Referees: Raluy, Sabroso (ESP)
October 16; 20:00	Carou, F. Fernández 6	(16–5)	Acuña 6	San Rafael Gymnasium; Referees: Raluy, Sabroso (ESP)
October 16; 20:00	3× (yellow card) 4× (suspension) 1× (red card)	Report	3× (yellow card) 4× (suspension)	San Rafael Gymnasium; Referees: Raluy, Sabroso (ESP)

October 18; 15:00	United States	19–36	Argentina	San Rafael Gymnasium; Referees: Durán, Guzmán (MEX)
October 18; 15:00	Hines 6	(9–12)	Pizarro 8	San Rafael Gymnasium; Referees: Durán, Guzmán (MEX)
October 18; 15:00	1× (yellow card) 8× (suspension)	Report	3× (yellow card) 1× (suspension)	San Rafael Gymnasium; Referees: Durán, Guzmán (MEX)

October 18; 18:00	Mexico	29–30	Dominican Republic	San Rafael Gymnasium; Referees: Pinto, Meneses (BRA)
October 18; 18:00	Villalobos 7	(15–15)	K. de León 10	San Rafael Gymnasium; Referees: Pinto, Meneses (BRA)
October 18; 18:00	4× (yellow card) 5× (suspension)	Report	3× (yellow card) 7× (suspension)	San Rafael Gymnasium; Referees: Pinto, Meneses (BRA)

October 20; 18:00	Argentina	28–20	Dominican Republic	San Rafael Gymnasium; Referees: Raluy, Sabroso (ESP)
October 20; 18:00	F. Fernández, Pizarro 6	(13–11)	Mirabal 6	San Rafael Gymnasium; Referees: Raluy, Sabroso (ESP)
October 20; 18:00		Report		San Rafael Gymnasium; Referees: Raluy, Sabroso (ESP)

October 20; 20:00	Mexico	33–32	United States	San Rafael Gymnasium; Referees: Marina, Minore (ARG)
October 20; 20:00	Bermúdez 9	(21–18)	Hines 9	San Rafael Gymnasium; Referees: Marina, Minore (ARG)
October 20; 20:00		Report		San Rafael Gymnasium; Referees: Marina, Minore (ARG)

== Elimination stage ==
Semi-finals
October 22
Brazil	41
Dominican Republic	17
October 22
Argentina	26
Chile	25

Final
October 24
Brazil	23
Argentina	26
Third place
October 24
Dominican Republic	24
Chile	27

=== Semifinals ===
October 22; 10:00	Brazil	41–17	Dominican Republic	San Rafael Gymnasium; Referees: Marina, Minore (ARG)
October 22; 10:00	Chiuffa 6	(18–8)	four players 3	San Rafael Gymnasium; Referees: Marina, Minore (ARG)
October 22; 10:00	3× (yellow card) 1× (suspension)	Report	3× (yellow card) 5× (suspension)	San Rafael Gymnasium; Referees: Marina, Minore (ARG)

October 22; 17:30	Argentina	26–25	Chile	San Rafael Gymnasium; Referees: Pinto, Meneses (BRA)
October 22; 17:30	F. Fernández 8	(15–10)	R. Salinas 7	San Rafael Gymnasium; Referees: Pinto, Meneses (BRA)
October 22; 17:30	4× (yellow card) 4× (suspension)	Report	4× (yellow card) 7× (suspension)	San Rafael Gymnasium; Referees: Pinto, Meneses (BRA)

=== 5th–8th place semifinals ===
October 22; 12:30	Canada	26–25	United States	San Rafael Gymnasium; Referees: Pérez, Guzmán (PUR)
October 22; 12:30	Walder 5	(13–14)	El-Zoghby 5	San Rafael Gymnasium; Referees: Pérez, Guzmán (PUR)
October 22; 12:30	3× (yellow card) 2× (suspension)	Report	2× (yellow card)	San Rafael Gymnasium; Referees: Pérez, Guzmán (PUR)

October 22; 20:00	Mexico	30–25	Venezuela	San Rafael Gymnasium; Referees: De Souza, Paz (BRA)
October 22; 20:00	Bermúdez 8	(15–10)	Godoy, Peñaloza 5	San Rafael Gymnasium; Referees: De Souza, Paz (BRA)
October 22; 20:00	3× (yellow card) 6× (suspension)	Report	3× (yellow card) 6× (suspension)	San Rafael Gymnasium; Referees: De Souza, Paz (BRA)

=== Seventh place match ===
October 24; 10:00	United States	39–35	Venezuela	San Rafael Gymnasium; Referees: Paz, De Souza (BRA)
October 24; 10:00	El-Zoghby 7	(18–16)	Silva 9	San Rafael Gymnasium; Referees: Paz, De Souza (BRA)
October 24; 10:00	2× (yellow card) 7× (suspension) 1× (red card)	Report	4× (yellow card) 3× (suspension)	San Rafael Gymnasium; Referees: Paz, De Souza (BRA)

=== Fifth place match ===
October 24; 12:30	Canada	26–23	Mexico	San Rafael Gymnasium; Referees: González, Prieto (URU)
October 24; 12:30	Bessette 9	(11–12)	Bermúdez 5	San Rafael Gymnasium; Referees: González, Prieto (URU)
October 24; 12:30	3× (yellow card) 1× (suspension)	Report	2× (yellow card) 3× (suspension)	San Rafael Gymnasium; Referees: González, Prieto (URU)

=== Bronze medal match ===
October 24; 17:30	Dominican Republic	24–27	Chile	San Rafael Gymnasium; Referees: Marina, Minore (ARG)
October 24; 17:30	Mirabal 8	(10–12)	Araya, Martínez 5	San Rafael Gymnasium; Referees: Marina, Minore (ARG)
October 24; 17:30	2× (yellow card) 8× (suspension)	Report	3× (yellow card) 6× (suspension) 1× (red card)	San Rafael Gymnasium; Referees: Marina, Minore (ARG)

=== Gold medal match ===
October 24; 20:00	Brazil	23–26	Argentina	San Rafael Gymnasium; Referees: Raluy, Sabroso (ESP)
October 24; 20:00	Borges 6	(14–15)	F. Fernández 6	San Rafael Gymnasium; Referees: Raluy, Sabroso (ESP)
October 24; 20:00	4× (yellow card) 7× (suspension)	Report	4× (yellow card) 5× (suspension)	San Rafael Gymnasium; Referees: Raluy, Sabroso (ESP)

2011 Pan American Games winners

Argentina
1st title

== Final standings ==
Rank	Team	Record
Gold medal	Argentina	5 – 0 – 0
Silver medal	Brazil	4 – 0 – 1
Bronze medal	Chile	3 – 0 – 2
4	Dominican Republic	2 – 0 – 3
5	Canada	3 – 0 – 2
6	Mexico	2 – 0 – 3
7	United States	1 – 0 – 4
8	Venezuela	0 – 0 – 5

== Medalists ==
Event	Gold	Silver	Bronze
Men's	Argentina; Gonzalo Carou; Federico Fernandez; Fernando Garcia; Juan Fernandez; Andrés Kogovsek; Damián Migueles; Federico Pizarro; Cristian Plati; Pablo Portela; Leonardo Querin; Matías Schulz; Diego Simonet; Sebastián Simonet; Juan Vidal; Federico Vieyra	Brazil; Leonardo Bortolini; Gustavo Cardoso; Fabio Chiuffa; Bruno De Santana; Marcos Dos Santos; Thiagus dos Santos; Jaqson Kojoroski; Fernando Filho; Gil Pires; Felipe Ribeiro; Renato Rui; Maik Santos; Ales Silva; Henrique Teixeira; Vinicius Teixeira	Chile; Guillermo Araya; Felipe Barrientos; Rodolfo Cornejo; Rodrigo Diaz; Emil Feuchtmann; Erwin Feuchtmann; Harald Feuchtmann; Nicolas Jofre; Patricio Martinez; Felipe Maurin; Rene Oliva; Marco Oneto; Esteban Salinas; Rodrigo Salinas; Alfredo Valenzuela
