= 2010 Pan American Men's Handball Championship =

PanAmericano 2010

Tournament details
- Host country: Chile
- Venue(s): 1 (in 1 host city)
- Dates: 22–26 June
- Teams: 8 (from 1 confederation)

Final positions
- Champions: Argentina (4th title)
- Runner-up: Brazil
- Third place: Chile
- Fourth place: Cuba

Tournament statistics
- Matches played: 20
- Goals scored: 1,076 (53.8 per match)
- Top scorer(s): (Chile) Emil Feuchtmann (35 goals)

The 2010 American Handball Championship, also called PanAmericano 2010, was the 14th official competition for senior men's national handball teams of North, Center, Caribbean and South America. It was held from 22 to 26 June 2010 in Santiago, Chile. It was also acting as the qualifying competition for the 2011 World Men's Handball Championship, securing three vacancies for the World Championship. Brazil, Argentina and Chile got the Tickets for finishing at the first three places.

== Participating teams ==
Group A	Group B
Argentina; Chile (Host Nation); Uruguay; Canada	Brazil (Defending Champion); Cuba; Greenland; Dominican Republic

== Preliminary round ==
All times are local (UTC−3).

Team advanced to the Semifinals
Team will play Placement Matches

=== Group A ===
Team	Pld	W	D	L	GF	GA	GD	Pts
Argentina	3	3	0	0	97	44	+53	6
Chile (H)	3	1	1	1	81	78	+3	3
Uruguay	3	1	1	1	73	88	−15	3
Canada	3	0	0	3	66	107	−41	0

(H) Hosts

22 June 2010; 15:30	Argentina	32–14	Uruguay
22 June 2010; 15:30		(14–4)

22 June 2010; 20:30	Chile	36–25	Canada
22 June 2010; 20:30		(15–10)

23 June 2010; 16:00	Argentina	39–12	Canada
23 June 2010; 16:00		(17–6)

23 June 2010; 20:00	Chile	27–27	Uruguay
23 June 2010; 20:00		(17–12)

24 June 2010; 16:00	Uruguay	32–29	Canada
24 June 2010; 16:00		(13–13)

24 June 2010; 20:00	Argentina	26–18	Chile
24 June 2010; 20:00		(15–6)

=== Group B ===
Team	Pld	W	D	L	GF	GA	GD	Pts
Brazil	3	3	0	0	100	66	+34	6
Cuba	3	2	0	1	97	81	+16	4
Greenland	3	1	0	2	73	81	−8	2
Dominican Republic	3	0	0	3	52	94	−42	0

22 June 2010; 13:30	Brazil	29–23	Greenland
22 June 2010; 13:30		(17–8)

22 June 2010; 17:30	Cuba	39–15	Dominican Republic
22 June 2010; 17:30		(18–4)

23 June 2010; 14:00	Cuba	32–25	Greenland
23 June 2010; 14:00		(17–13)

23 June 2010; 18:00	Brazil	30–17	Dominican Republic
23 June 2010; 18:00		(17–11)

24 June 2010; 14:00	Brazil	41–26	Cuba
24 June 2010; 14:00		(23–12)

24 June 2010; 18:00	Greenland	25–20	Dominican Republic
24 June 2010; 18:00		(12–11)

== Placement matches ==
5th–8th Place
June 25, 2010
Dominican Republic	24
Uruguay	28
June 25, 2010
Greenland	38
Canada	36

5th/6th Place
June 26, 2010
Uruguay	30
Greenland	27
7th/8th Place
June 26, 2010
Dominican Republic	22
Canada	33

=== 5th–8th place semifinals ===
25 June 2010; 14:00	Uruguay	28–24	Dominican Republic
25 June 2010; 14:00		(14–12)

25 June 2010; 16:00	Greenland	38–36	Canada
25 June 2010; 16:00		(18–12)

=== Seventh place game ===
26 June 2010; 14:00	Canada	33–22	Dominican Republic
26 June 2010; 14:00		(16–9)

=== Fifth place game ===
26 June 2010; 16:00	Uruguay	30–27	Greenland
26 June 2010; 16:00		(15–13)

== Final round ==
Semifinals
June 25, 2010
Brazil	33
Chile	21
June 25, 2010
Argentina	17
Cuba	8

Final
June 26, 2010
Brazil	27
Argentina (ET)	28
3rd/4th Place
June 26, 2010
Chile	34
Cuba	31

=== Semifinals ===
25 June 2010; 18:00	Brazil	33–21	Chile
25 June 2010; 18:00		(15–5)

25 June 2010; 20:00	Argentina	17–8	Cuba

- A Bomb threat stopped the semifinal of the Pan American Tournament. An anonymous phone call announced an imminent bomb explosion in the Centro de Entrenamiento Olimpico in Santiago de Chile forced the officials to stop the semifinal match of the Pan American Tournament, Argentina – Cuba. In that moment, Argentina was leading Cuba 17–8.

=== Third place game ===
26 June 2010; 18:00	Chile	34–31	Cuba
26 June 2010; 18:00		(13–14)

=== Final ===
26 June 2010
20:00
Argentina
28–27 (ET)
Brazil

(10–11)

FT: 23–23 ET: 2–2, 3–2

== Final ranking ==
Gold medal	Argentina
Silver medal	Brazil
Bronze medal	Chile
4	Cuba
5	Uruguay
6	Greenland
7	Canada
8	Dominican Republic

Team advanced to the 2011 World Men's Handball Championship

== All-star team ==
Position	Player	Country
Goalkeeper	Maik dos Santos	Brazil
Right back	Fernando Pacheco Filho	Brazil
Center back	Emil Feuchtmann	Chile
Left back	Agustin Vidal	Argentina
Right wing	Patricio Martínez Chávez	Chile
Pivot	Gonzalo Carou	Argentina
Left wing	Carlos Mirabal	Dominican Republic
