= Vladimir Andjelic =

Former Serbian handball player

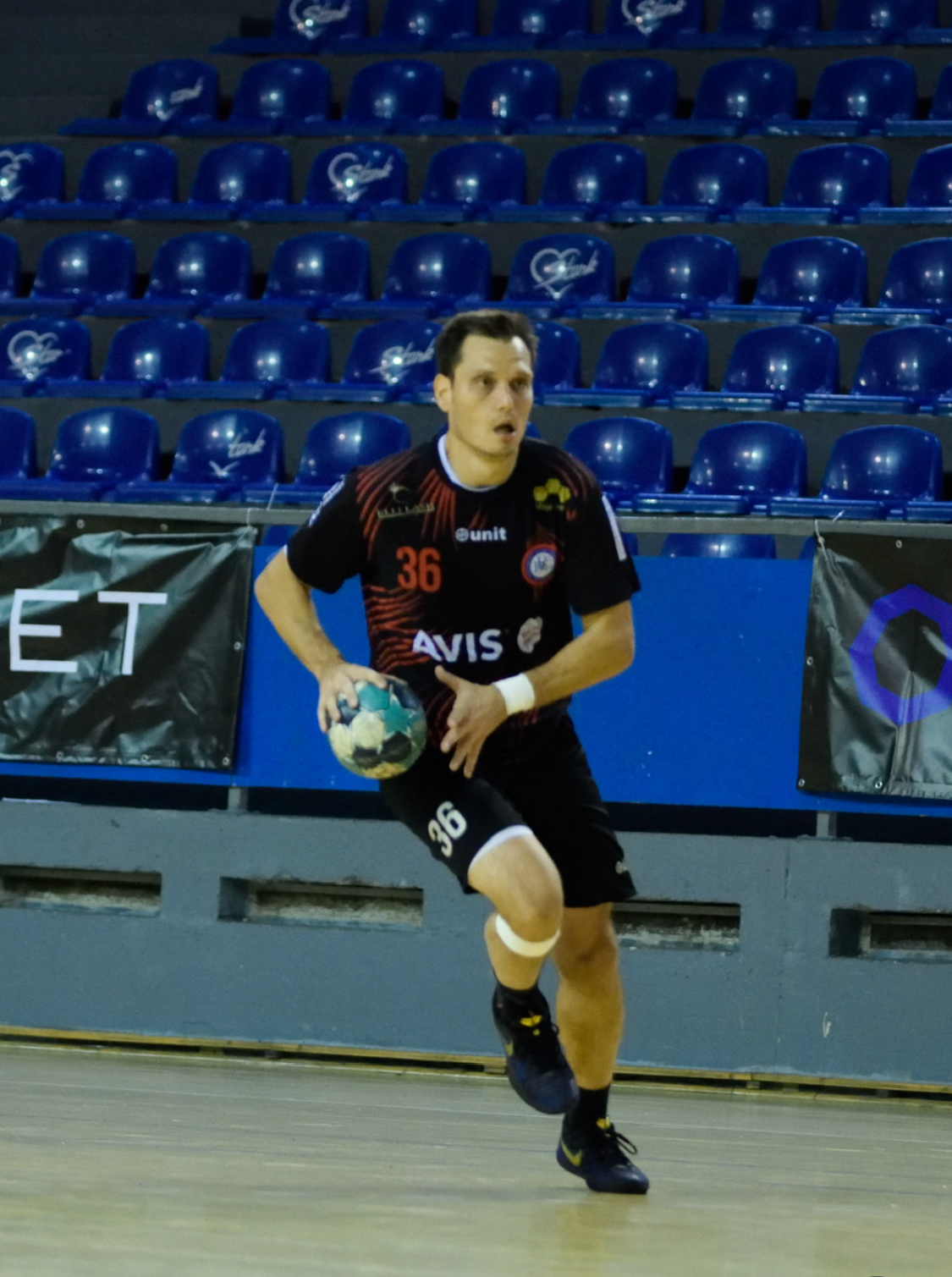

Personal information
- Native name: ВЛАДИМИР АНЂЕЛИЋ (Vladimir Anđelić)
- National team: Yugoslavia men's national junior handball team and United States men's national handball team
- Born: August 10, 1980 (age 45); Belgrade, Yugoslavia
- Education: Bachelor Degree in Business administration
- Occupation: Former Professional Athlete
- Years active: 1998-2004
- Height: 1.85 m (6 ft 1 in)

Sport
- Country: Republic of Serbia
- Sport: Handball
- Position: Left wing

Vladimir Andjelic is a former Serbian handball player who has played for the senior national team of the United States from 2011 to 2015 and participated in the 2014 Pan American Men's Handball Championship.

== Career ==
Andjelic started his professional career in 1997 when he signed his first professional contract with RK Partizan where he spent 7 years representing the club at the highest level of national and international competitions. He was also a member of the Yugoslavia junior national team from 2000-2001 and was a part of the team that qualified for the European Men's U-20 Handball Championship in Athens in which Yugoslavia won the gold medal. Additionally, he took part in the qualification tournament for the 2012 Pan American Men's Handball Championship (French-wiki). In his professional career, he played for RK Partizan Belgrade, RK Borac Banja Luka, and Metalac from Valjevo. With RK Partizan, he won two titles as the champion of Yugoslavia and two Yugoslav Cups. He also participated with RK Partizan in the European Champions League in the year 2000.

During the 2002/03 season, Vladimir Andelic played as a significant member for Partizan Belgrade in the Yugoslav handball league until March 5, 2003. He actively participated in various competitions during this period, including the 2002–03 EHF Champions League and the EHF European Cup 2002-03. In addition, he made contributions in earlier seasons such as the Cup Winners' Cup in 2001-02 and the EHF Cup in 2000-01.

== Clubs ==
- 1997—2003 RK Partizan
- 2003 RK Borac Banja Luka
- 2003—2004 RK Metalac
- 2004 RK Partizan

== Competitions ==
Year	Competition	Club	Ref.
2002-03	EHF Champions League	RK Partizan (YUG)	
2002-03	EHF European Cup	RK Partizan (YUG)	
2001-02	EHF Cup Winners' Cup	RK Partizan (YUG)	
2000-01	EHF European Cup	RK Partizan (YUG)	
1999-00	EHF Champions League	RK Partizan (YUG)	
1998-99	EHF Cup Winners' Cup	RK Partizan (YUG)	
