= Salah Bouchekriou =

Algerian handball player (born 1962)

Personal information
- Nationality: Algerian
- Born: February 17, 1962 (age 64)
- Height: 180 cm (71 in)

Sport
- Sport: Handball
- Position: Centerback

Senior clubs
- Years: Team
- –: ERC/IRB Bina Alger
National team
- Years: Team
- –: Algeria

Teams managed
- 2016-2017: Bahrain
- 2025-: Algeria

Salah Bouchekriou (Arabic: صالح بوشكريو, born 17 February 1962) is an Algerian handball player and coach.

He played for the Algerian national team and participated at the 1988 Summer Olympics, where the Algerian team placed tenth.

He was the head coach for the Bahrain men's national handball team from 2016 to 2017. In 2025 he became the head coach of the Algerian national team.
