= Fernando Luis Capurro =

Chilean handball coach (born 1963)

Fernando Luis Capurro (born 23 April 1963) is a Chilean handball coach. He coached the Chilean national team until 2016, when he was replaced by Mateo Garralda.

He coached the Chile team at the 2011 World Men's Handball Championship, where they finished 22nd of 24, at the 2013 World Men's Handball Championship, where they finished 23th of 24, and at the 2015 World Men's Handball Championship, where they finished 23th of 24 for a second time in a row.
