= Nicolás Jofre =

Chilean handball player (born 1984)

Personal information
- Nationality: Chilean
- Born: 16 October 1984 (age 42)
- Height: 1.80 m (5 ft 11 in)

Sport
- Sport: Handball
- Position: Centre back
- Current club: Santiago Steel
National team
Years	Team	Apps	(Gls)
–	Chile	73	(66)
Medal record
Pan American Games
Bronze medal – third place	2011 Guadalajara	Team
Bronze medal – third place	2015 Toronto	Team
Pan American Championship
Silver medal – second place	2016 Argentina
Bolivarian Games
Gold medal – first place	2017 Santa Marta

Nicolás Jofre (born 16 October 1984) is a Chilean handball player for Santiago Steel and the Chilean national team.
