= Gui Oliveira =

Brazilian handball player (born 1985)

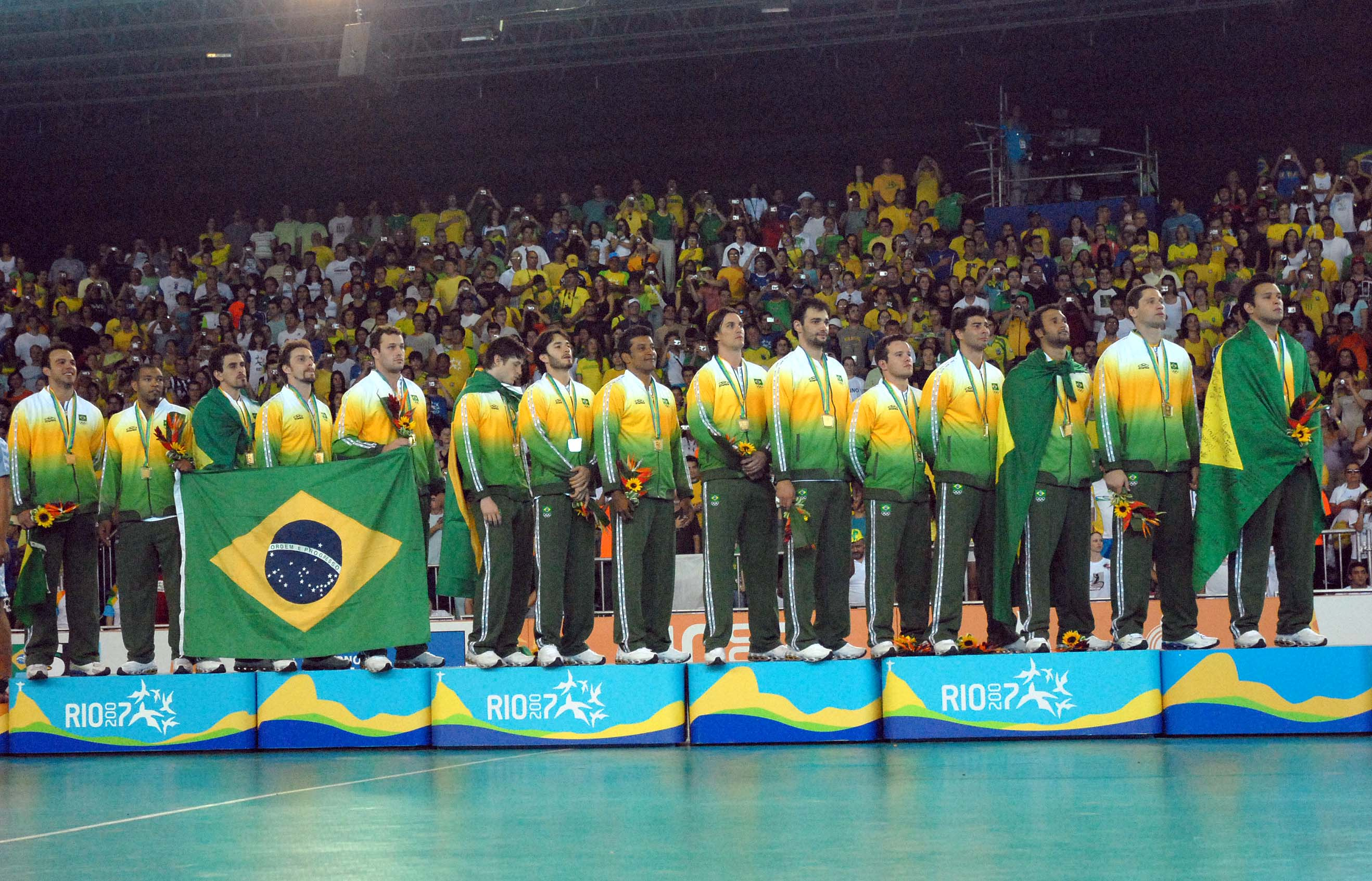
Gui the podium after winning gold at the 2007 Pan American Games

Guilherme Oliveira also known as Gui (born 8 January 1985) is a Brazilian handball player (left guard) who competed in the 2008 Summer Olympics, where Brazil finished eleventh.

Born in Goiania and the son of an agricultural aircraft pilot, Guilherme discovered handball at school when he was 12 years old. His teacher, who was a handball coach at the time, believed in the boy's potential and invited him to train with the juniors at a club. He soon began to play the sport professionally, and at the age of 16, he moved from Goiânia to São Paulo.

He was scouted during a competition outside his state and caught the attention of Guarulhos, a team he stayed with until 2003.

In 2007 he participated in the World Championship and the Pan American Games in Rio de Janeiro, when the team won the gold medal.

== Achievements ==
- Pan American Men's Club Handball Championship:
  - 2015, 2016, 2018
- South and Central American Men's Club Handball Championship:
  - 2019
