= Adel Bousmal =

Algerian handball goalkeeper (born 1985)

Personal information
- Nationality: Algerian
- Born: 1 May 1985 (age 41)
- Height: 1.94 m (6 ft 4 in)

Sport
- Sport: Handball
- Position: Goalkeeper
- Number: MC Alger

Senior clubs
- Years: Team
- 2005-2015: GS Boufarik
- 2015-2017: CRB Baraki
- 2017-2018: Mesleki Yeterlilik
- 2018-2022: JSE Skikda
- 2022-: MC Alger
National team
Years	Team	Apps	(Gls)
2011-	Algeria	45	(0)
Medal record
African Championship
Silver medal – second place	2012 Morocco
Bronze medal – third place	2020 Tunisia

Adel Bousmal (born 1 May 1985) is an Algerian handball goalkeeper.

He competed for the Algerian national team at the 2015 World Men's Handball Championship in Qatar.

He also participated at the 2011 and 2013 World Championships.
