= Artur Siódmiak =

Polish handball player (born 1975)

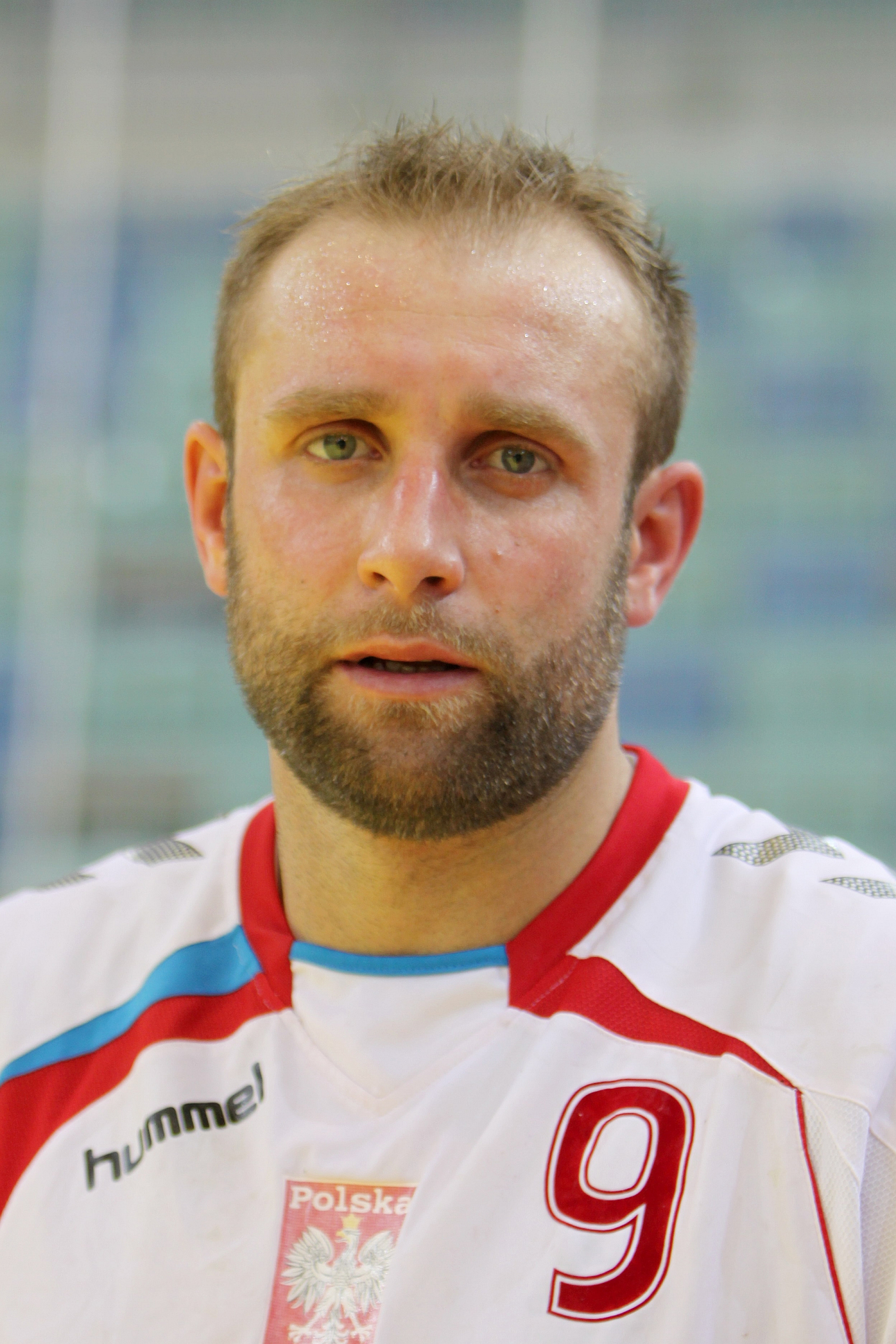

Personal information
- Nationality: Polish
- Born: 7 October 1975 (age 51) Wągrowiec, Poland
- Height: 1.92 m (6 ft 4 in)

Sport
- Sport: Handball
- Position: Pivot

Senior clubs
- Years: Team
- –1996: MKS Nielba Wągrowiec
- 1996–2003: Wybrzeże Gdańsk
- 2003: KS Warszawianka
- 2004: HBC Bascharage
- 2004–2005: Saint-Raphaël Var Handball
- 2005–2006: Pfadi Winterthur
- 2006–2008: Kadetten Schaffhausen
- 2008–2012: TuS Nettelstedt-Lübbecke
National team
Years	Team	Apps	(Gls)
1998–2011	Poland	133	(102)
Medal record
World Championship
Silver medal – second place	2007 Germany
Bronze medal – third place	2009 Croatia

Artur Siódmiak (born 7 October 1975) is a retired Polish team handball player, who was playing on the Poland men's national handball team.

He received a silver medal with the Polish team at the 2007 World Men's Handball Championship and a bronze medal at the 2009 World Men's Handball Championship. He participated at the 2008 Summer Olympics, where Poland finished 5th.

At the 2009 World Men's Handball Championship held in Croatia, he became a hero when scored a long range effort just 4 seconds before the final whistle in the quarterfinal match between Poland and Norway, where Poles won.
