= Rodrigo Díaz (handballer) =

Chilean handball player (born 1988)

Personal information
- Full name: Rodrigo Joaquín Díaz Castelló
- Nationality: Chilean
- Born: 31 August 1988 (age 38)
- Height: 1.95 m (6 ft 5 in)

Sport
- Sport: Handball
- Position: Right back

Senior clubs
- Years: Team
- 2007–2013: Club Italiano
- 2014: Handebol Londrina
- 2014–2021: Club Italiano
National team
Years	Team	Apps	(Gls)
–	Chile	32	(60)
Medal record
Pan American Games
Bronze medal – third place	2011 Guadalajara	Team

Rodrigo Joaquín Díaz Castelló (born 31 August 1988) is a Chilean former handball player for the Chilean national team. He is also a well known Medal of Honor Allied Assault player, who won his first Chilean National Championship in 2008.
