= Akihito Kai =

Japanese handball player (born 1987)

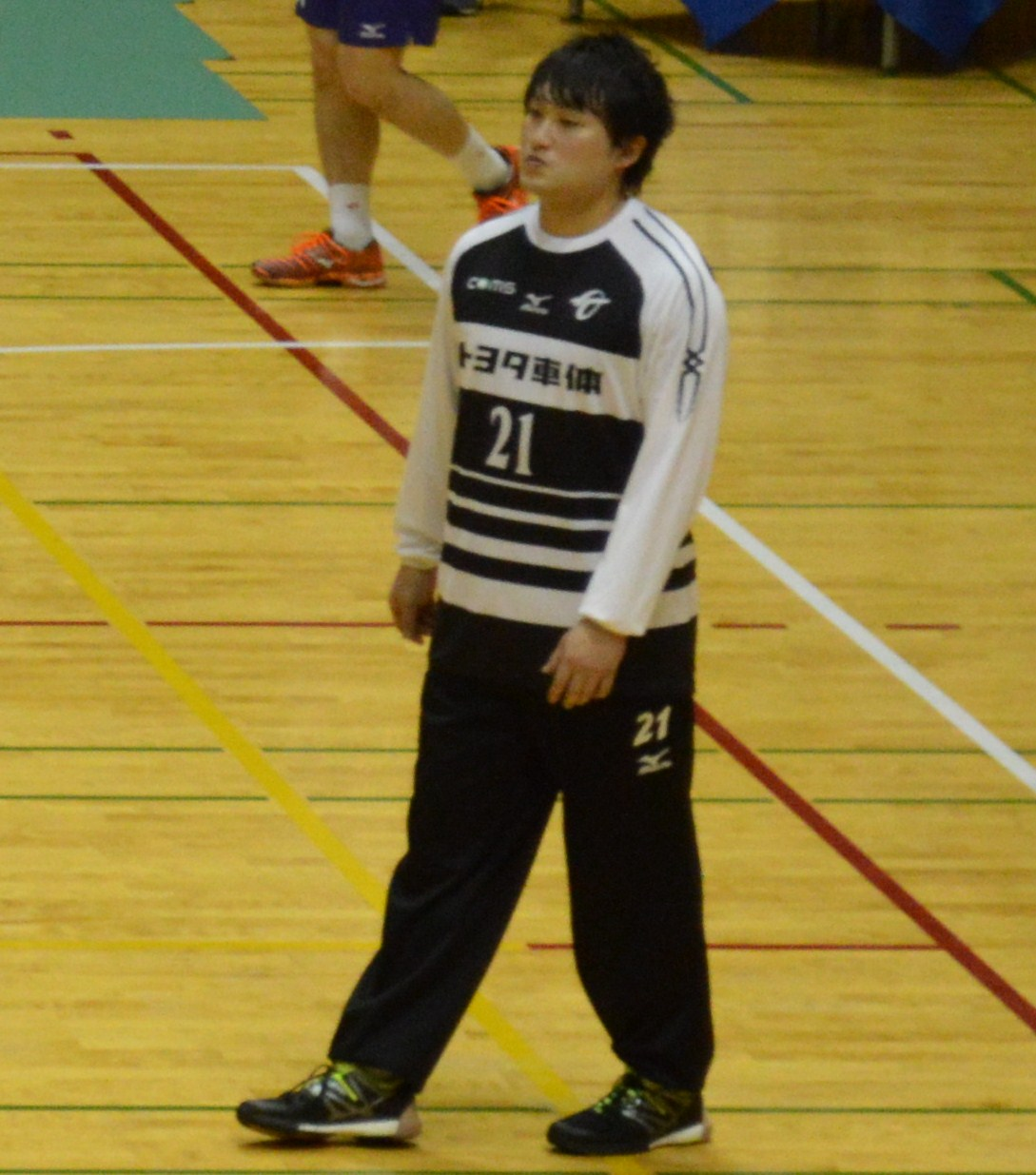

Personal information
- Nationality: Japanese
- Born: 29 April 1987 (age 39)
- Height: 1.84 m (6 ft 0 in)

Sport
- Sport: Handball
- Position: Goalkeeper
- Current club: Toyota Auto Body
National team
Years	Team	Apps	(Gls)
–	Japan	84	(9)

Akihito Kai (甲斐 昭人, Kai Akihito; born 29 April 1987) is a Japanese handball player for Toyota Auto Body and the Japanese national team.

He participated at the 2017 World Men's Handball Championship.
