= René Oliva =

Chilean handball player (born 1987)

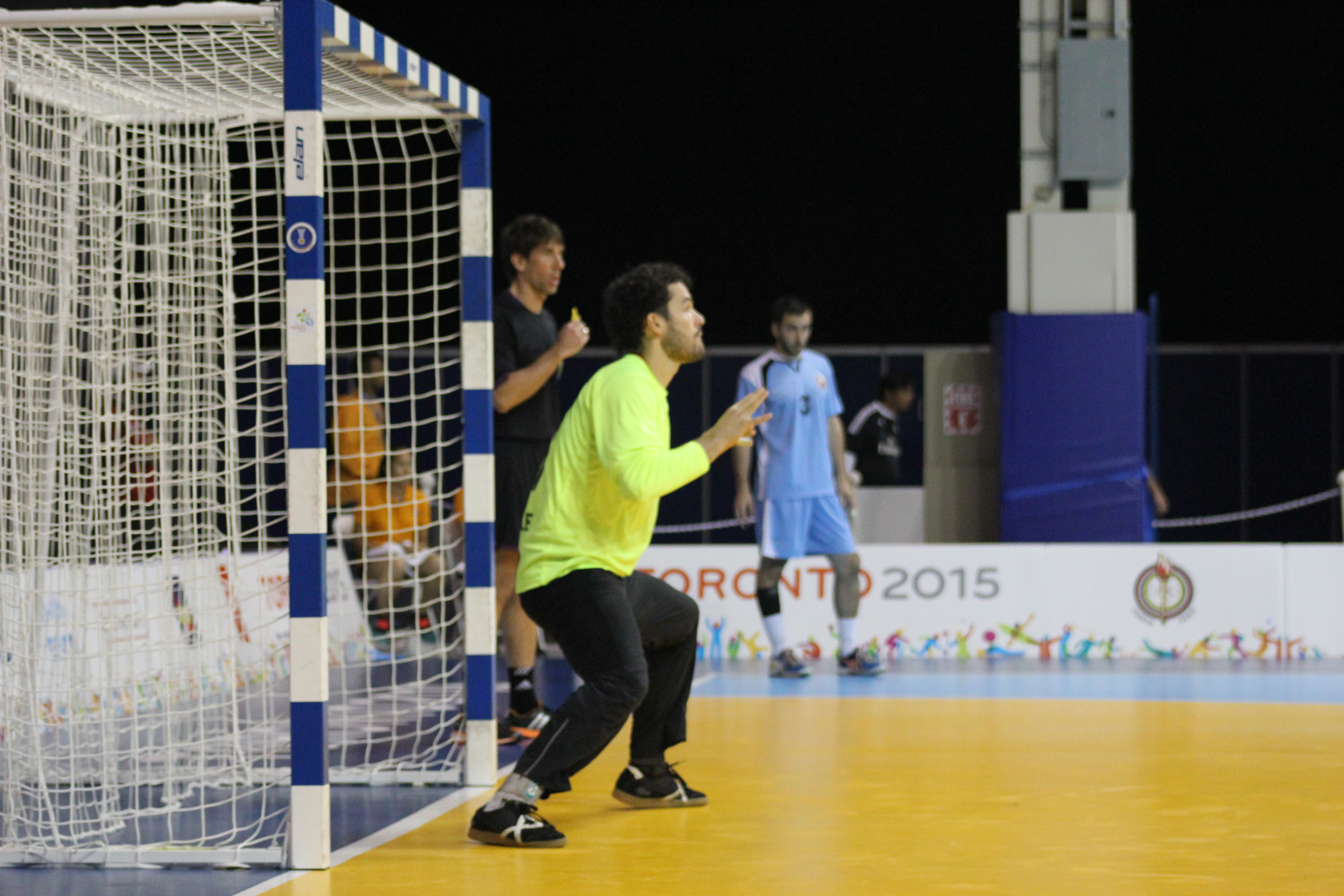

Personal information
- Full name: René Alejandro Oliva Cifuentes
- Born: 7 March 1987 (age 39) Santiago, Chile
- Height: 1.96 m (6 ft 5 in)

Sport
- Sport: Handball
- Position: Goalkeeper
- Current club: CB Ovalle

Senior clubs
- Years: Team
- 2004–2007: CB Ovalle
- 2007–2013: Balonmano Bailén
- 2013–: CB Ovalle
National team
Years	Team	Apps	(Gls)
–	Chile	66	(0)
Medal record
Pan American Games
Bronze medal – third place	2011 Guadalajara	Team
Bronze medal – third place	2015 Toronto	Team
Pan American Championship
Silver medal – second place	2016 Argentina
South and Central American Championship
Bronze medal – third place	2024 Argentina
Bolivarian Games
Gold medal – first place	2017 Santa Marta

René Alejandro Oliva Cifuentes (born 7 March 1987) is a Chilean handball player for CB Ovalle and the Chilean national team.
