= Felipe Barrientos =

Chilean handball player (born 1984)

Personal information
- Full name: Felipe Ignacio Barrientos Castillo
- Born: 12 June 1984 (age 42) Santiago, Chile
- Height: 1.84 m (6 ft 0 in)

Sport
- Sport: Handball
- Position: Goalkeeper

Senior clubs
- Years: Team
- 1998–2002: Club Italiano
- 2002: Guarulhos HC
- 2003–2005: Club Italiano
- 2005–2006: CDB Castellón
- 2006–2018: Club Italiano
- 2018–2020: BM Zamora
National team
Years	Team	Apps	(Gls)
–	Chile	97	(3)
Medal record
Pan American Games
Silver medal – second place	2019 Lima	Team
Bronze medal – third place	2011 Guadalajara	Team
Bronze medal – third place	2015 Toronto	Team
Pan American Championship
Silver medal – second place	2016 Argentina
Bronze medal – third place	2018 Greenland
South American Games
Bronze medal – third place	2018 Cochabamba	Team
Bolivarian Games
Gold medal – first place	2017 Santa Marta

Felipe Ignacio Barrientos Castillo (born 12 June 1984) is a Chilean handball player. He last played for BM Zamora and the Chilean national team.
