= Guillermo Araya =

Chilean handball player (born 1985)

Personal information
- Nationality: Chilean
- Born: 6 August 1985 (age 41)
- Height: 1.85 m (6 ft 1 in)

Sport
- Sport: Handball
- Position: Centre back
- Current club: Balónmano Ovalle
National team
Years	Team	Apps	(Gls)
–	Chile	73	(90)
Medal record
Pan American Games
Bronze medal – third place	2011 Guadalajara	Team
Bronze medal – third place	2015 Toronto	Team

Guillermo Araya (born 6 August 1985) is a Chilean handball player for Balónmano Ovalle and the Chilean national team.
