= Harald Feuchtmann =

Chilean handball player (born 1987)

Personal information
- Full name: Harald Johann Feuchtmann Pérez
- Born: 22 December 1987 (age 38) Punta Arenas, Chile
- Height: 1.76 m (5 ft 9 1/2 in)

Sport
- Sport: Handball
- Position: Left wing

Senior clubs
- Years: Team
- 2003–2005: Universidad de Chile
- 2005–2006: SV 04 Plauen-Oberlosa
- 2006–2007: HSG Hohn/Elsdorf
- 2007–2008: CB Vinaròs
- 2009–2011: CB Almoradí
- 2011–2013: TSV Friedberg
- 2013–2014: HG 85 Köthen
- 2014–2015: HSC Bad Neustadt
- 2015–2017: DJK Waldbüttelbrunn
- 2017–2018: Leichlinger
- 2018–2019: Skogås HK
- 2019–2021: AIK Handboll
National team
Years	Team	Apps	(Gls)
–	Chile	39	(60)
Medal record
Pan American Games
Bronze medal – third place	2011 Guadalajara	Team
Pan American Championship
Silver medal – second place	2016 Argentina
- Updated on 15 January 2021

Harald Johann Feuchtmann Pérez (born 22 December 1987) is a Chilean former handball player who represented the Chilean national team.

He participated at the 2017 World Men's Handball Championship.

He is the brother of Emil and Erwin who are both handball players themselves.
