= Felipe Borges (handballer) =

Brazilian handball player (born 1985)

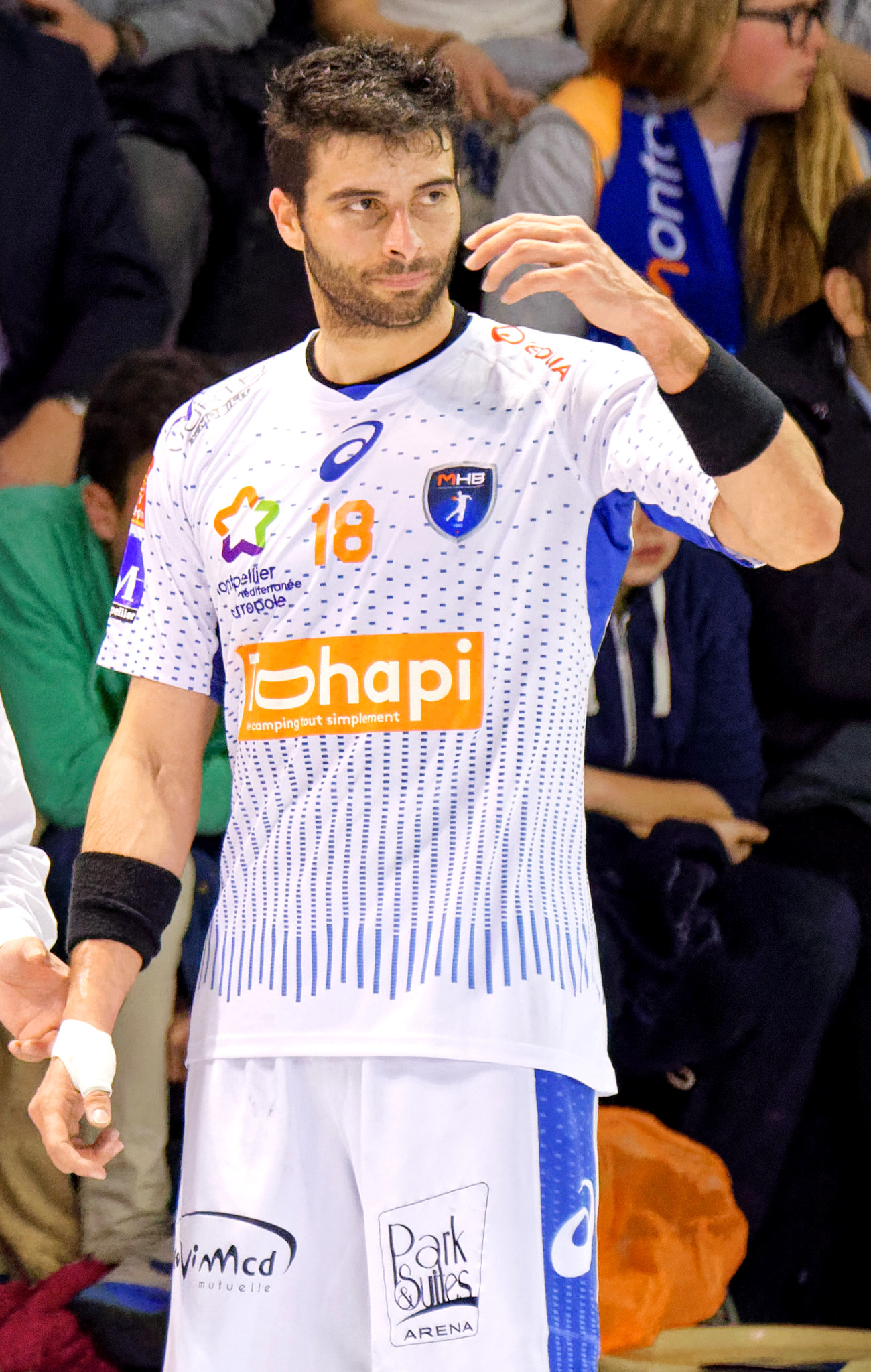
- Felipe Borges in 2016

Personal information
- Full name: Felipe Borges Dutra Ribeiro
- Born: 4 May 1985 (age 41) São Bernardo do Campo, Brazil
- Height: 1.88 m (6 ft 2 in)

Sport
- Sport: Handball
- Position: Left wing
- Current club: Casademont Zaragoza
- Number: 18

Senior clubs
- Years: Team
- 1997–2007: Metodista SBC
- 2007–2009: BM Aragón
- 2010–2011: EC Pinheiros
- 2011–2013: CB Ademar León
- 2013–2016: Montpellier Handball
- 2017–2018: Sporting CP
- 2018–2020: Tremblay-en-France
- 2020–2021: US Créteil Handball
- 2021–2022: Ángel Ximénez Puente Genil
- 2022–: Casademont Zaragoza
National team
Years	Team	Apps	(Gls)
–	Brazil	228	(801)
Medal record
Pan American Games
Gold medal – first place	2007 Rio de Janeiro	Team
Gold medal – first place	2015 Toronto	Team
Silver medal – second place	2011 Guadalajara	Team
Bronze medal – third place	2019 Lima	Team
Pan American Championship
Gold medal – first place	2006 Aracaju
Gold medal – first place	2008 São Carlos
Gold medal – first place	2016 Argentina
Silver medal – second place	2010 Santiago
Silver medal – second place	2012 Buenos Aires
Silver medal – second place	2018 Greenland
South and Central American Championship
Silver medal – second place	2020 Brazil
South American Games
Gold medal – first place	2018 Cochabamba	Team

Felipe Borges Dutra Ribeiro (born 4 May 1985) is a Brazilian handball player for US Créteil Handball and the Brazilian national team.

He participated at the 2008 Summer Olympics, where the Brazilian team placed 11th.

== Awards and recognition ==
- Clubs
  - Coupe de France: 2016
  - Coupe de la Ligue: 2016
- Individual
  - All-Star Left Wing of the Pan American Championship:
    - 2012, 2016
