= Renato Tupan Ruy =

Brazilian handball player (born 1979)

Tupan
Personal information
- Full name: Renato Tupan Ruy
- Born: 6 July 1979 (age 47) Maringá, Brazil
- Height: 1.89 m (6 ft 2 in)

Sport
- Sport: Handball
- Position: Right back

Senior clubs
- Years: Team
- 1988: Colégio Marista de Maringá
- 1989-1997: Clube Olímpico Maringá
- 1997-2002: EC Pinheiros
- 2002-2003: São Caetano
- 2003-2004: HSG Langenau-Elchingen
- 2004-2006: HSG Niestetal-Staufenberg
- 2006: TSV Hannover-Burgdorf
- 2006-2009: Wilhelmshavener HV
- 2009-2010: TuS N-Lübbecke
- 2010-2011: Metodista / São Bernardo-SP
- 2011: TG Münden
- 2011-2014: Metodista / São Bernardo-SP
- 2014-2015: Sydney University Handball Club
- 2015: Terraquilia Carpi
- 2015-2016: Sydney University Handball Club
National team
Years	Team	Apps	(Gls)
1998-	Brazil	133	(231)
Medal record
Men's handball
Representing Brazil
Pan American Games
Gold medal – first place	2003 Santo Domingo	Team
Gold medal – first place	2007 Rio de Janeiro	Team
Silver medal – second place	2011 Guadalajara	Team
- Updated on 20 September 2021

Renato Tupan Ruy (born 7 June 1979), known as Tupan, is a Brazilian former handball player who competed in the 2004 Summer Olympics and in the 2008 Summer Olympics.

He played most of his career in his native Brazil as well as in Germany, with short stints in Italy and Australia.
