= Marco Oneto =

Chilean handball player (born 1982)

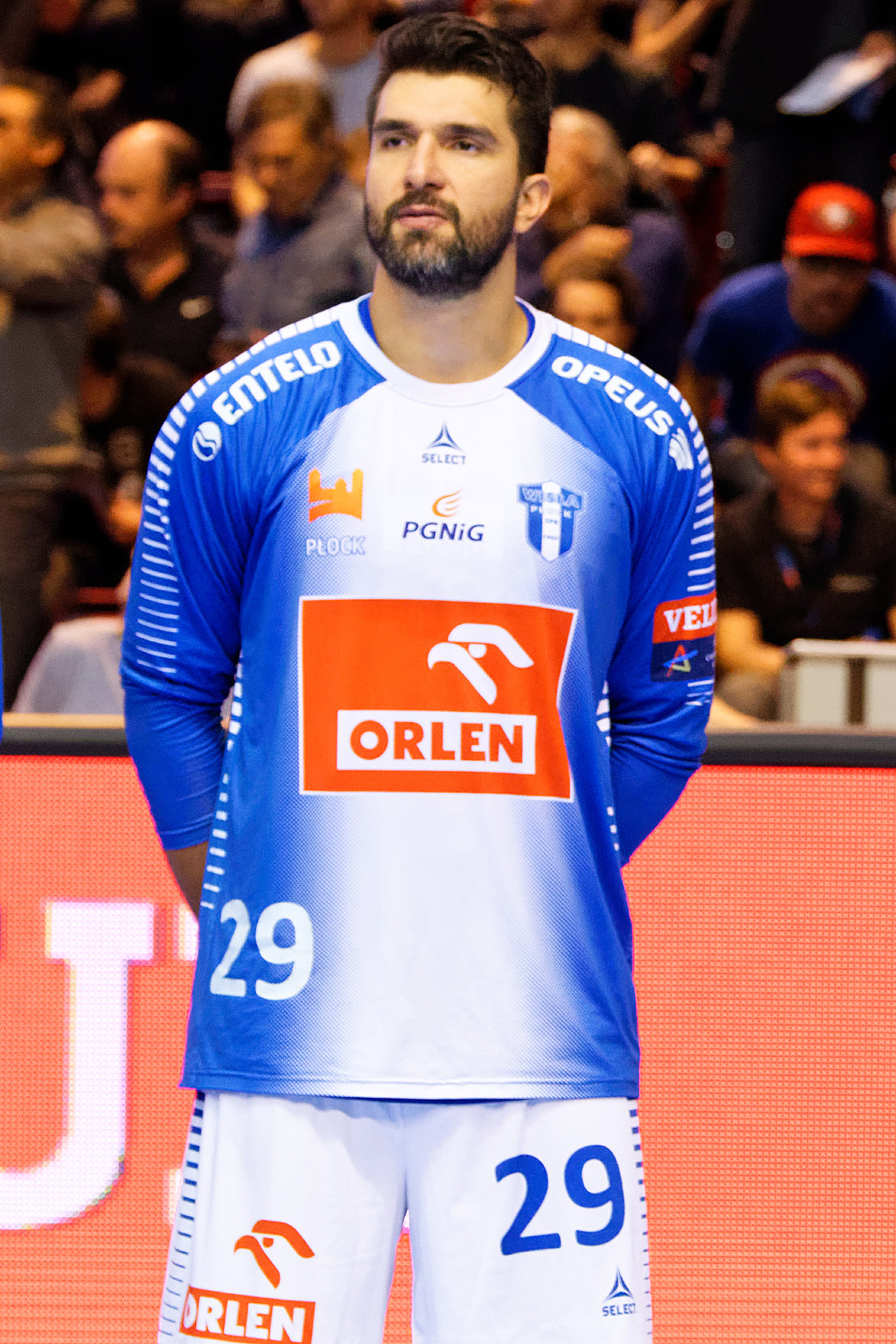

Personal information
- Full name: Marco Antonio Oneto Zúñiga
- Nationality: Chilean/Italian
- Born: 3 June 1982 (age 44) Viña del Mar, Chile
- Height: 2.04 m (6 ft 8 in)

Sport
- Sport: Handball
- Position: Pivot

Youth career
- Years: Team
- 1999–2000: FC Barcelona

Senior clubs
- Years: Team
- 2000–2001: FC Barcelona
- 2001–2002: Alicante Costa Blanca
- 2002–2005: Cangas
- 2005–2007: Bidasoa
- 2007–2009: Ciudad de Logroño
- 2009–2012: FC Barcelona
- 2012–2013: MKB Veszprém
- 2013–2014: SC Magdeburg
- 2014–2015: GWD Minden
- 2015–2016: Wisła Płock
- 2016–2017: Sporting CP
- 2017–2018: Albatro Siracusa
National team
Years	Team	Apps	(Gls)
–	Chile	115	(178)
Medal record
Pan American Games
Silver medal – second place	2019 Lima	Team
Bronze medal – third place	2011 Guadalajara	Team
Bronze medal – third place	2015 Toronto	Team
Pan American Championship
Bronze medal – third place	2018 Greenland
South American Games
Bronze medal – third place	2018 Cochabamba	Team

Marco Antonio Oneto Zúñiga (born 3 June 1982) is a Chilean-Italian retired handball player. He retired from club handball in 2018 but still plays for the Chilean national team.

== Honours ==
- FC Barcelona
  - 1 EHF Champions League (2010–11)
  - 1 Liga ASOBAL (2010–11)
  - 2 Copa del Rey (2008–09), (2009–10)
  - 2 Liga Pirineos (2009–10), (2010–11)
  - 1 Supercopa de España (2009–10)
  - 1 Copa ASOBAL (2009–10)
