= Gustavo Cardoso (handballer) =

Brazilian handball player (born 1982)

Personal information
- Nationality: Brazilian
- Born: 9 January 1982 (age 44)
- Height: 1.92 m (6 ft 4 in)

Sport
- Sport: Handball
- Position: Right back
- Current club: Handebol Clube Taubaté
National team
Years	Team	Apps	(Gls)
–	Brazil	92	(210)

Gustavo Cardoso (born 9 January 1982) is a Brazilian handball player for Handebol Clube Taubaté and the Brazilian national team.
