= Emil Feuchtmann =

Chilean handball player (born 1983)

Personal information
- Full name: Emil Feuchtmann Pérez
- Born: 1 June 1983 (age 43) Punta Arenas, Chile
- Height: 1.76 m (5 ft 9 in)

Sport
- Sport: Handball
- Position: Centre back
- Current club: EÓN Horneo Alicante
- Number: 10

Senior clubs
- Years: Team
- 1998–2001: Universidad de Chile
- 2002–2003: São Paulo Handebol
- 2003–2004: BM Ciudad De Puertollano
- 2004–2006: CB Petrer
- 2006–2007: BM Huesca
- 2007–2008: CB Vinaròs
- 2008–2010: CB Almoradí
- 2010–2011: SG West Wien
- 2011–2013: HC Aschersleben
- 2013–2015: HSC Bad Neustadt
- 2015–2017: Wacker Thun
- 2017–2020: Grand Nancy Métropole HB
- 2020–2021: BM Benidorm
- 2021–: EÓN Horneo Alicante
National team
Years	Team	Apps	(Gls)
2001-	Chile	164	(442)
Medal record
Pan American Games
Silver medal – second place	2019 Lima	Team
Bronze medal – third place	2011 Guadalajara	Team
Bronze medal – third place	2023 Santiago	Team
Pan American Championship
Silver medal – second place	2016 Argentina
South and Central American Championship
Bronze medal – third place	2022 Brazil
South American Games
Silver medal – second place	2022 Asunción	Team
Bronze medal – third place	2018 Cochabamba	Team
- Updated on 28 January 2023

Emil Ludwig Feuchtmann Pérez (born 1 June 1983) is a Chilean handball player for BM Benidorm and the Chilean national team.

He participated at the 2017 World Men's Handball Championship.

He is the brother of Inga, Harald and Erwin who are both handball players themselves.
