= Yoo Young-a =

South Korean footballer (born 1988)

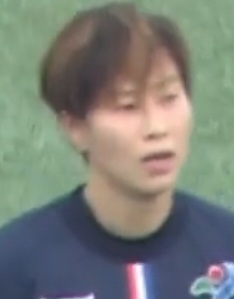

Personal information
- Date of birth: 15 April 1988 (age 38)
- Height: 1.64 m (5 ft 5 in)
- Position: Forward

Senior career*
Years	Team	Apps	(Gls)
2009–2013	Busan Sangmu		
2014–2016	Hyundai Steel Red Angels		
2017–2019	Sejong Sportstoto		
2020–2024	Seoul City		

International career
2005	South Korea U17	4	(1)
2006–2007	South Korea U20	7	(5)
2009	South Korea Universiade	4	(3)
2007–2017	South Korea	87	(32)
- * Club domestic league appearances and goals

Yoo Young-a (Korean: 유영아; Korean pronunciation: [ju.jʌŋ.a]; born 15 April 1988) is a retired South Korean footballer who played as a forward. She currently works as a coach for Seoul City Amazones WFC. As one of the so-called '1988 line' along with Jeon Ga-eul, Cho So-hyun, Kim Do-yeon, Kwon Hah-nul, and Lee Eun-mi, she is considered part of a 'golden generation' of Korean women's football.

== Club career ==
Yoo's club career began in 2009 with the military team Busan Sangmu, competing in the newly established WK League. In the same year, the team won the silver medal at the World Military Women's Football Championship, losing 1–0 to Brazil in the final. While playing for Busan, Yoo earned a reputation as one of the WK League's top goalscorers, ranking second for goals scored in 2010 and 2012.

Ahead of the 2014 season, Yoo transferred to Incheon Hyundai Steel Red Angels. Yoo was the first player to score ten goals in the 2014 WK League, contributing to a 13-game unbeaten run for Incheon. The club went on to win the league title and Yoo was once again among the season's top goalscorers. The Red Angels lifted the WK League trophy again in 2015 and 2016, with Yoo scoring one of the team's four goals in the 2016 championship final.

As Yoo was gradually spending more time on the bench at Incheon, she made the move to Gumi Sportstoto in 2017 as the team aimed to reach their first championship final, having made it as far as the playoff in 2016. Yoo was attracted by the prospect of this challenge and hoped that playing for Gumi would allow her more freedom on the pitch. The Sportstoto coaching staff saw Yoo as the club's "final puzzle piece", being a positive influence in the locker room as well as bringing her experience and goalscoring talent. Sportstoto were unable to achieve their aims in the league but they did achieve their first ever title at the 16th National Women's Football Championship in 2017. The team went on to defend their title the following year, with Yoo picking up the tournament's MVP award.

After three years with Sportstoto, Yoo transferred to Seoul City along with Park Eun-sun. Seoul manager Yoo Young-sil hoped that as veteran players, Yoo and Park would be the "mental pillars" of the largely young and inexperienced squad. Yoo announced her retirement from football in 2024, making her final appearance for Seoul in the club's round 26 home match against Sportstoto on 12 September.

== International career ==
Yoo played for South Korea at the 2005 AFC U-17 Women's Championship, scoring in the side's group stage victory against Thailand.

In 2009, Yoo represented her country at the Summer Universiade in Belgrade, scoring two goals in South Korea's opening group stage match against Germany. South Korea went on to win the tournament after beating Japan 4–1 in the final.

Yoo made her first senior international appearance at the qualifying tournament for the 2008 Summer Olympics, scoring a goal in her debut match. She was part of the squad that progressed to the round of 16 at the 2015 FIFA Women's World Cup, and won the bronze medal at the Asian Games in 2010 and 2014. Yoo made 87 senior appearances in total for South Korea, scoring 32 goals.

== Career statistics ==
=== International ===
Appearances and goals by national team and year
National team	Year	Apps	Goals
South Korea	2007	6	1
South Korea	2008	1	2
South Korea	2009	4	4
South Korea	2010	12	7
South Korea	2011	9	1
South Korea	2012	0	0
South Korea	2013	5	0
South Korea	2014	16	11
South Korea	2015	15	2
South Korea	2016	6	1
South Korea	2017	13	3
Total		87	32

Scores and results list South Korea's goal tally first, score column indicates score after each Yoo goal.

List of international goals scored by Yoo Young-a
No.	Date	Venue	Opponent	Score	Result	Competition	Ref.
1	17 February 2007	Masan Stadium, Changwon, South Korea	India	4–0	5–0	2008 Summer Olympics qualification	
2	26 March 2008	80th Birthday Stadium, Nakhon Ratchasima, Thailand	Malaysia	2–0	14–0	2008 AFC Women's Asian Cup qualification	
3	26 March 2008	80th Birthday Stadium, Nakhon Ratchasima, Thailand	Malaysia	5–0	14–0	2008 AFC Women's Asian Cup qualification	
4	24 August 2009	Tainan County Stadium, Tainan, Taiwan	Guam	2–0	9–0	2010 EAFF Women's Football Championship qualification	
5	24 August 2009	Tainan County Stadium, Tainan, Taiwan	Guam	8–0	9–0	2010 EAFF Women's Football Championship qualification	
6	28 August 2009	Tainan County Stadium, Tainan, Taiwan	Hong Kong	1–0	7–0	2010 EAFF Women's Football Championship qualification	
7	30 August 2009	Tainan County Stadium, Tainan, Taiwan	Chinese Taipei	2–0	6–0	2010 EAFF Women's Football Championship qualification	
8	7 February 2010	Olympic Stadium, Tokyo, Japan	Chinese Taipei	4–0	4–0	2010 EAFF Women's Football Championship	
9	13 February 2010	Ajinomoto Stadium, Tokyo, Japan	Japan	1–2	1–2	2010 EAFF Women's Football Championship	
10	23 May 2010	Shuangliu Sports Centre, Chengdu, China	Vietnam	1–0	5–0	2010 AFC Women's Asian Cup	
11	23 May 2010	Shuangliu Sports Centre, Chengdu, China	Vietnam	2–0	5–0	2010 AFC Women's Asian Cup	
12	23 May 2010	Shuangliu Sports Centre, Chengdu, China	Vietnam	5–0	5–0	2010 AFC Women's Asian Cup	
13	16 November 2010	University Town Stadium, Guangzhou, China	Jordan	4–0	5–0	2010 Asian Games	
14	20 November 2010	Tianhe Stadium, Guangzhou, China	North Korea	1–1	1–3	2010 Asian Games	
15	8 September 2011	Jinan Olympic Sports Center, Jinan, China	Thailand	2–0	3–0	2012 Summer Olympics qualification	
16	11 March 2014	Tasos Markos Stadium, Paralimni, Cyprus	New Zealand	2–0	4–0	2014 Cyprus Women's Cup	
17	12 March 2014	GSZ Stadium, Larnaca, Cyprus	Scotland	1–0	1–1	2014 Cyprus Women's Cup	
18	25 May 2014	Thống Nhất Stadium, Ho Chi Minh City, Vietnam	China	1–1	1–2	2014 AFC Women's Asian Cup	
19	14 September 2014	Namdong Asiad Rugby Field, Incheon, South Korea	Thailand	3–0	5–0	2014 Asian Games	
20	17 September 2014	Namdong Asiad Rugby Field, Incheon, South Korea	India	2–0	10–0	2014 Asian Games	
21	17 September 2014	Namdong Asiad Rugby Field, Incheon, South Korea	India	5–0	10–0	2014 Asian Games	
22	17 September 2014	Namdong Asiad Rugby Field, Incheon, South Korea	India	8–0	10–0	2014 Asian Games	
23	17 September 2014	Namdong Asiad Rugby Field, Incheon, South Korea	India	9–0	10–0	2014 Asian Games	
24	21 September 2014	Munhak Stadium, Incheon, South Korea	Maldives	9–0	13–0	2014 Asian Games	
25	21 September 2014	Munhak Stadium, Incheon, South Korea	Maldives	11–0	13–0	2014 Asian Games	
26	12 November 2014	Hsinchu County Stadium, Zhubei, Taiwan	Guam	2–0	15–0	2015 EAFF Women's East Asian Cup qualification	
27	13 January 2015	Bao'an Stadium, Shenzhen, China	China	1–2	3–2	2015 Four Nations Tournament	
28	11 March 2015	Paralimni Stadium, Paralimni, Cyprus	Belgium	1–1	1–1	2015 Cyprus Women's Cup	
29	21 January 2016	Shenzhen Universiade Sports Centre, Foshan, China	Vietnam	3–0	5–0	2016 Four Nations Tournament	
30	5 April 2017	Kim Il Sung Stadium, Pyongyang, North Korea	India	6–0	10–0	2018 AFC Women's Asian Cup qualification	
31	9 April 2017	Kim Il Sung Stadium, Pyongyang, North Korea	Hong Kong	2–0	6–0	2018 AFC Women's Asian Cup qualification	
32	11 April 2017	Kim Il Sung Stadium, Pyongyang, North Korea	Uzbekistan	4–0	4–0	2018 AFC Women's Asian Cup qualification	

== Honours ==
Busan Sangmu

- World Military Women's Football Championship silver medal: 2009, 2010, 2012

Incheon Hyundai Steel Red Angels

- WK League: 2014, 2015, 2016

Gumi Sportstoto

- National Women's Football Championship: 2017, 2018

South Korea Universiade

- Summer Universiade gold medal: 2009

South Korea

- Asian Games bronze medal: 2010, 2014

Individual

- National Women's Football Championship MVP: 2018
