= 2016 International Tournament of Spain =

- Official poster

Tournament details
- Host country: Spain
- Venue(s): 1 (in 1 host city)
- Dates: 2016-01-08 – 2016-01-10
- Teams: 4 (from 2 confederations)

Final positions
- Champions: Spain
- Runner-up: Poland
- Third place: Brazil
- Fourth place: Sweden

Tournament statistics
- Matches played: 6
- Goals scored: 316 (52.67 per match)
- Top scorer(s): (Poland) Przemysław Krajewski; (16 goals)

The 2016 International Tournament of Spain was the 41st edition of the International Tournament of Spain and the 15th edition with the name of Memorial Domingo Bárcenas, held in Irun, Spain from 8 January to 10 January, as a friendly handball tournament organized by the Royal Spanish Handball Federation as a preparation of the host nation to the 2016 European Men's Handball Championship.

== Results ==
Team	Pld	W	D	L	GF	GA	GD	Pts
Spain	3	3	0	0	95	64	+31	6
Poland	3	2	0	1	67	75	–8	4
Brazil	3	1	0	2	81	89	–8	2
Sweden	3	0	0	3	73	88	–15	0

== Round robin ==
2016-01-08; 18:45	Poland	27 – 23	Brazil	Pabellón Polideportivo Artaleku, Irun
2016-01-08; 18:45	Krajewski 6	(14 – 9)	J. Silva, A. Silva 4	Pabellón Polideportivo Artaleku, Irun
2016-01-08; 18:45	2× (yellow card) 3× (suspension)	Report	3× (yellow card) 2× (suspension)	Pabellón Polideportivo Artaleku, Irun

2016-01-08; 20:45	Spain	32 – 22	Sweden	Pabellón Polideportivo Artaleku, Irun
2016-01-08; 20:45	three players 5	(17 – 7)	Nielsen 7	Pabellón Polideportivo Artaleku, Irun
2016-01-08; 20:45	2× (yellow card) 2× (suspension)	Report	3× (yellow card) 3× (suspension)	Pabellón Polideportivo Artaleku, Irun

2016-01-09; 16:00	Sweden	26 – 28	Poland	Pabellón Polideportivo Artaleku, Irun
2016-01-09; 16:00	L. Nilsson 5	(13 – 17)	Bielecki 7	Pabellón Polideportivo Artaleku, Irun
2016-01-09; 16:00	3× (yellow card) 3× (suspension)	Report	3× (yellow card) 6× (suspension) 1× (red card)	Pabellón Polideportivo Artaleku, Irun

2016-01-09; 18:00	Spain	37 – 30	Brazil	Pabellón Polideportivo Artaleku, Irun
2016-01-09; 18:00	Rivera 8	(20 – 13)	Toledo, Santos 4	Pabellón Polideportivo Artaleku, Irun
2016-01-09; 18:00	3× (yellow card) 1× (suspension)	Report	3× (yellow card) 6× (suspension)	Pabellón Polideportivo Artaleku, Irun

2016-01-10; 11:00	Brazil	28 – 25	Sweden	Pabellón Polideportivo Artaleku, Irun
2016-01-10; 11:00	Santos 6	(12 – 16)	A. Nilsson 6	Pabellón Polideportivo Artaleku, Irun
2016-01-10; 11:00	3× (yellow card) 1× (suspension)	Report	3× (yellow card) 4× (suspension)	Pabellón Polideportivo Artaleku, Irun

2016-01-10; 13:00	Spain	26 – 12	Poland	Pabellón Polideportivo Artaleku, Irun
2016-01-10; 13:00	Entrerríos 8	(14 – 7)	Krajewski 6	Pabellón Polideportivo Artaleku, Irun
2016-01-10; 13:00	3× (yellow card) 3× (suspension)	Report	3× (yellow card) 4× (suspension)	Pabellón Polideportivo Artaleku, Irun

== Final standing ==
Rank	Team
Gold medal	Spain
Silver medal	Poland
Bronze medal	Brazil
4	Sweden
