= Heiner Brand =

German handball player and coach (born 1952)

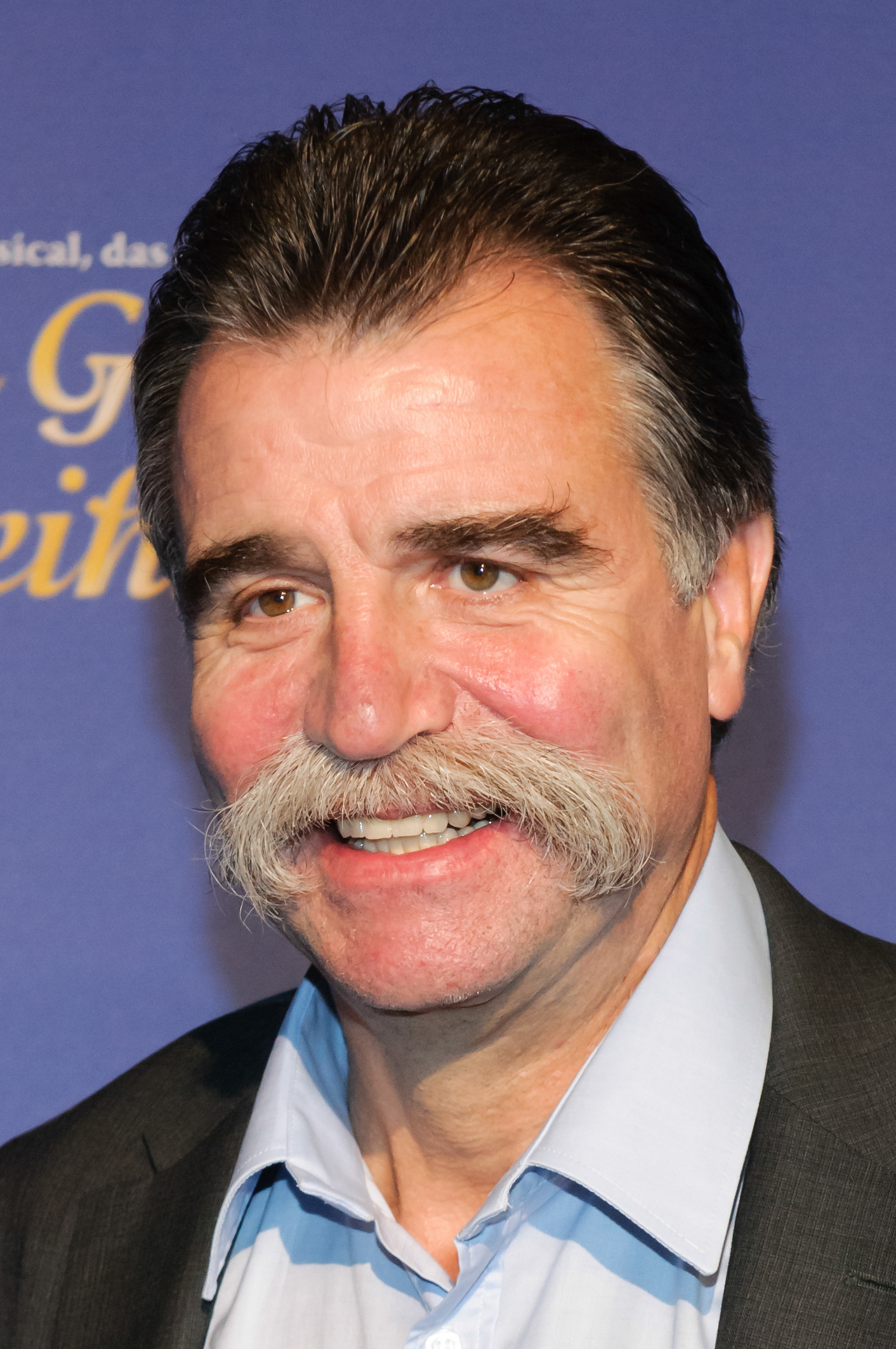
- Brand in 2013

Personal information
- Born: 26 July 1952 (age 74) Gummersbach, West Germany
- Height: 6 ft 2 in (1.88 m)

Sport
- Sport: Handball
- Position: Pivot

Youth career
- Years: Team
- 1959–87: VfL Gummersbach

Senior clubs
- Years: Team
- 1987–91: VfL Gummersbach
- 1992–94: SG Wallau-Massenheim
- 1994–96: VfL Gummersbach
National team
Years	Team	Apps	(Gls)
1974-1983	West Germany	130	(222)

Teams managed
- 1984-1987: VfL Gummersbach (assistant)
- 1984-1987: West Germany (assistant)
- 1987-1991: VfL Gummersbach
- 1992-1994: SG Wallau-Massenheim
- 1994-1996: VfL Gummersbach
- 1997–2011: Germany
Medal record
Representing Germany
Olympic Games
Silver medal – second place	1984 Los Angeles	Team
World Championship
Silver medal – second place	2003 Portugal	Coach
Gold medal – first place	2007 Germany	Coach
European Championship
Silver medal – second place	2002 Sweden	Coach
Bronze medal – third place	1998 Italy	Coach

Heiner Brand (born 26 July 1952) is a German former handball player and coach. He was the Germany national team coach from 1997 to 2011. He is the only person who has won the world handball championship both as a player (in 1978) and as a coach (in 2007).

== Career as player ==
Heiner Brand joined at the age of seven the handball club VfL Gummersbach. He was with that club six times German champion (1973, 1974, 1975, 1976, 1982 and 1983) and won the DHB-Pokal four times (1978, 1979, 1982 and 1983). He also became with that club internationally successful (European Cup winner in 1978 and 1979, European National Championship winner in 1974 in 1983, Super cup winner in 1979 and 1983, IHF cup winner in 1982).

Heiner Brand was also successful in the Germany men's national handball team, where he played a total of 130 games and scored 222 goals, including one penalty throw. In 1976, he was a member of the West German team that finished fourth in the Olympic tournament in Montreal. He played all six matches and scored twelve goals. In 1978, he was the World champion at the World Men's Handball Championship. His first two international goals he scored in his first game for Germany was on 1 July 1974 in Holon against Israel.

== Career as coach ==
Heiner Brand was a long-time coach for VfL Gummersbach over two periods (1987–91 and 1994–96). In between, he was the coach for SG Wallau-Massenheim (1992–94). With Gummersbach he won the German Championship in 1988 and 1991 and with SG Wallau-Massenheim he won both the German Championship and Cup in 1993 and the Cup again in 1994. He also reached the final of the 1993 European Cup, where they lost to Croatian team Badel 1862 Zagreb. Even before becoming a club coach, he was an assistant coach of the German national team (1984–87), in which he became the full-time coach on 1 January 1997. At the beginning of the new millennium, he raised the national team to the top. After the vice European Championship in 2002 and the vice World Cup in 2003, the DHB selection won in 2004 the European Championship and the same year the silver medal at the Summer Olympics in Athens.

In 2007 he won the World Championship, which made him the first handball player to win the World Championship as both player and as coach.

It was announced on 24 October 2007 that Brand's contract of the National team with the DHB would be extended until 30 June 2013. However, it was announced on 16 May 2011 that his post of national coach would expire on 30 June 2011. The results were the tenth place at the 2010 European Championship and the eleventh place at the 2011 World Championship. It was the worst result in the history of the German National Championship. Since 1. Juli 2011 Martin Heuberger has been the successor to Heiner Brand. Since 1 November 2004 Heuberger has been Assistant to Heiner Brand and Co-coach of the German National Handball team.

== Personal life ==
Brand is married and has two children. He has two older brothers named Klaus (born 1942) and Jochen (born 1944). Both also played for the German national team.

His trademark since the 1970s is his bushy walrus moustache.

== Success as coach ==
- 1984 : Summer Olympics in Los Angeles, silver medal (as assistant coach)
- 1988 : German Champion with VfL Gummersbach
- 1991 : German Champion with VfL Gummersbach
- 1993 : German Champion with SG Wallau-Massenheim
- 1993 : DHB cup winner with SG Wallau-Massenheim
- 1993 : European Cup finalist with SG Wallau-Massenheim
- 1994 : DHB cup winner with SG Wallau-Massenheim
- 1998 : Super cup winner with the national team
- 1998 : European Championship, third place
- 1999 : World Cup, fifth place
- 2000 : Summer Olympics in Sydney, fifth place
- 2001 : Super cup winner with the national team
- 2002 : Vice-European Champion, lost against Sweden
- 2003 : Vice-World Champion, lost against Croatia
- 2004 : European Champion against Slovenia (biggest success since the 1978 World Cup in Denmark)
- 2004 : Summer Olympics in Athens, silver medal, lost again against Croatia
- 2006 : European Champion, fifth place
- 2007 : World Champion with the German national team against Poland
- 2008 : European Championship, fourth place
- 2008 : Summer Olympics in Beijing, ninth place
- 2009 : World Cup, fifth place
- 2009 : Super cup winner with the national team
- 2010 : European Championship, tenth place
- 2011 : World Cup, eleventh place
