= Four Nations Tournament (handball) =

Friendly Handball competition

The Four Nations Tournament (Portuguese: Torneio Quatro Nações) is a friendly Handball competition held every year since 2014 in Brazil. It is organised by the Brazilian Handball Confederation.

== Men's tournament ==
=== Summary ===
Year	Host	1st place	2nd place	3rd place	4th place
2014; Details	(São Paulo (state)); São Bernardo do Campo	Brazil	Egypt	Argentina	Algeria
2015; Details	(Paraíba); João Pessoa	Brazil	Tunisia	Cuba	Chile
2016; Details	(São Paulo (state)); São Bernardo do Campo	Brazil	Chile	Cuba	Canada
2017; Details	(São Paulo (state)); São Bernardo do Campo	Brazil	Argentina	Uruguay	Chile

=== Participating nations ===
Nation	(São Paulo (state)) 2014	(Paraíba) 2015	(São Paulo (state)) 2016	(São Paulo (state)) 2017	Years
Brazil	1st	1st	1st	1st	4
Argentina	3rd	-	-	2nd	2
Canada	-	-	4th	-	1
Chile	-	4th	2nd	4th	3
Cuba	-	3rd	3rd	-	2
Uruguay	-	-	-	3rd	1
Algeria	4th	-	-	-	1
Egypt	2nd	-	-	-	1
Tunisia	-	2nd	-	-	1

== Women's tournament ==
=== Summary ===
Year	Host	1st place	2nd place	3rd place	4th place
2015	(Federal District (Brazil)); Brasília	Cancelled			
2016; Details	(Pará); Belém	Brazil	Slovakia	Uruguay	Cuba
2017; Details	(São Paulo (state)); São Bernardo do Campo	Brazil	Portugal	Chile	Dominican Republic

=== Participating nations ===
Nation	(Pará) 2016	(São Paulo (state)) 2017	Years
Brazil	1st	1st	2
Chile	-	3rd	1
Cuba	4th	-	1
Dominican Republic	-	4th	1
Uruguay	3rd	-	1
Portugal	-	2nd	1
Slovakia	2nd	-	1
