= 2016 Women's Four Nations Tournament =

Tournament details
- Host country: Brazil
- Venue(s): 1 (in 1 host city)
- Dates: 1–3 December
- Teams: 4 (from 2 confederations)

Final positions
- Champions: Brazil (1st title)
- Runner-up: Slovakia
- Third place: Uruguay
- Fourth place: Cuba

Tournament statistics
- Matches played: 6
- Goals scored: 296 (49.33 per match)
- Top scorer(s): Samira Rocha (BRA) (17 goals)

Awards
- Best player: Martina Skolkova (SVK)

The 2016 Women's Four Nations Tournament (Torneio Quatro Nações) in Portuguese, was the 1st edition of the Women's Four Nations Tournament held in Belém, Brazil between 1–3 December as a Women's friendly handball tournament organised by the Brazilian Handball Confederation.

== Results ==
Team	Pld	W	D	L	GF	GA	GD	Pts
Brazil	3	2	1	0	102	41	61	5
Slovakia	3	2	1	0	88	47	41	5
Uruguay	3	1	0	2	70	75	–5	2
Cuba	3	0	0	3	36	133	–97	0

== Round robin ==
All times are local (UTC−03:00).

December 1; 15:00	Uruguay	15–29	Slovakia	Ginásio Guilherme Paraense, Belém
December 1; 15:00		(6–15)		Ginásio Guilherme Paraense, Belém

December 1; 17:45	Brazil	51–9	Cuba	Ginásio Guilherme Paraense, Belém
December 1; 17:45		(25–3)		Ginásio Guilherme Paraense, Belém

December 2; 18:00	Slovakia	38–11	Cuba	Ginásio Guilherme Paraense, Belém
December 2; 18:00		(17–5)		Ginásio Guilherme Paraense, Belém

December 2; 20:30	Brazil	30–11	Uruguay	Ginásio Guilherme Paraense, Belém
December 2; 20:30		(13–16)		Ginásio Guilherme Paraense, Belém

December 3; 10:00	Brazil	21–21	Slovakia	Ginásio Guilherme Paraense, Belém
December 3; 10:00		(10–11)		Ginásio Guilherme Paraense, Belém

December 3; 12:00	Cuba	16–44	Uruguay	Ginásio Guilherme Paraense, Belém
December 3; 12:00		(6–20)		Ginásio Guilherme Paraense, Belém

== Final standing ==
Rank	Team
Gold medal	Brazil
2	Slovakia
3	Uruguay
4	Cuba

== Awards ==
- Best Player: (Slovakia) Martina Skolkova
- Best Goalkeeper: (Brazil) Bárbara Arenhart
- Top Scorer: (Brazil) Samira Rocha
