= Diego Morandeira =

Uruguayan handball player (born 1993)

Personal information
- Nationality: Uruguayan
- Born: 4 February 1993 (age 33)
- Height: 1.88 m (6 ft 2 in)

Sport
- Sport: Handball
- Position: Right Back
- Current club: Ikasa Madrid
National team
Years	Team	Apps	(Gls)
–	Uruguay	125	(52)
Medal record
South and Central American Championship
Bronze medal – third place	2020 Brazil
South American Games
Bronze medal – third place	2022 Asunción	Team

Diego Morandeira (born 4 February 1993) is an Uruguayan handball player for Ikasa Madrid and the Uruguay national team.

He represented Uruguay at the 2021 World Men's Handball Championship.

== Achievements ==
- 2017 Four Nations Tournament: Top scorer
