= 2017 Four Nations Tournament =

Tournament details
- Host country: Brazil
- Venue: 1 (in 1 host city)
- Dates: 27–29 October
- Teams: 4 (from 1 confederation)

Final positions
- Champions: Brazil (4th title)
- Runners-up: Argentina
- Third place: Uruguay
- Fourth place: Chile

Tournament statistics
- Matches played: 6
- Goals scored: 294 (49 per match)
- Top scorers: (Uruguay) Diego Morandeira (13 goals)

Awards
- Best player: (Brazil) João Pedro Silva

The 2017 Four Nations Tournament (Torneio Quatro Nações) in Portuguese, was the fourth edition of the Four Nations Tournament held in São Bernardo do Campo, Brazil between 27–29 October as a Men's friendly handball tournament organised by the Brazilian Handball Confederation.

== Results ==
Team	Pld	W	D	L	GF	GA	GD	Pts
Brazil	3	3	0	0	90	55	35	6
Argentina	3	2	0	1	87	68	19	4
Uruguay	3	1	0	2	55	90	–35	2
Chile	3	0	0	3	62	81	–19	0

== Round robin ==
All times are local (UTC−02:00).

27 October 2017; 17:00	Argentina	29–24	Chile	Ginásio Adib Moyses Dib, São Bernardo do Campo
27 October 2017; 17:00		(14–10)		Ginásio Adib Moyses Dib, São Bernardo do Campo

27 October 2017; 19:00	Brazil	34–15	Uruguay	Ginásio Adib Moyses Dib, São Bernardo do Campo
27 October 2017; 19:00		(16–8)		Ginásio Adib Moyses Dib, São Bernardo do Campo

28 October 2017; 16:00	Argentina	35–18	Uruguay	Ginásio Adib Moyses Dib, São Bernardo do Campo
28 October 2017; 16:00		(16–10)		Ginásio Adib Moyses Dib, São Bernardo do Campo

28 October 2017; 18:00	Brazil	30–17	Chile	Ginásio Adib Moyses Dib, São Bernardo do Campo
28 October 2017; 18:00		(20–9)		Ginásio Adib Moyses Dib, São Bernardo do Campo

29 October 2017; 10:00	Brazil	26–23	Argentina	Ginásio Adib Moyses Dib, São Bernardo do Campo
29 October 2017; 10:00		(14–9)		Ginásio Adib Moyses Dib, São Bernardo do Campo

29 October 2017; 12:30	Uruguay	22–21	Chile	Ginásio Adib Moyses Dib, São Bernardo do Campo
29 October 2017; 12:30		(12–10)		Ginásio Adib Moyses Dib, São Bernardo do Campo

== Final standing ==
Rank	Team
Gold medal	Brazil
2	Argentina
3	Uruguay
4	Chile

== Awards ==
- MVP: (Brazil) João Pedro Silva
- Top Scorer: (Uruguay) Diego Morandeira
- Best Goalkeeper: (Argentina) Leonel Maciel
