= 2014 Four Nations Tournament =

- tournament logo

Tournament details
- Host country: Brazil
- Venue: 1 (in 1 host city)
- Dates: 30 October - 1 November
- Teams: 4 (from 2 confederations)

Final positions
- Champions: Brazil (1st title)
- Runners-up: Egypt
- Third place: Argentina
- Fourth place: Algeria

Tournament statistics
- Matches played: 6
- Goals scored: 288 (48 per match)
- Top scorers: Messaoud Berkous (ALG) (20 goals)

The 2014 Four Nations Tournament (Torneio Quatro Nações) in Portuguese, was the first edition of the Four Nations Tournament held in São Bernardo do Campo, Brazil between 30 October –1 November as a Men's friendly handball tournament organised by the Brazilian Handball Confederation.

== Results ==
Team	Pld	W	D	L	GF	GA	GD	Pts
Brazil	3	3	0	0	77	71	+6	6
Egypt	3	2	0	1	71	70	+1	4
Argentina	3	1	0	2	72	64	+8	2
Algeria	3	0	0	3	68	83	–15	0

== Round robin ==
October 30	Argentina	21 – 24	Egypt	Ginásio Adib Moyses Dib, São Bernardo do Campo
October 30		(8–12)		Ginásio Adib Moyses Dib, São Bernardo do Campo

October 30	Brazil	29 – 27	Algeria	Ginásio Adib Moyses Dib, São Bernardo do Campo
October 30		(13–14)		Ginásio Adib Moyses Dib, São Bernardo do Campo

October 31	Algeria	15 – 27	Argentina	Ginásio Adib Moyses Dib, São Bernardo do Campo
October 31		(7–13)		Ginásio Adib Moyses Dib, São Bernardo do Campo

October 31	Brazil	23 – 20	Egypt	Ginásio Adib Moyses Dib, São Bernardo do Campo
October 31		(10–13)		Ginásio Adib Moyses Dib, São Bernardo do Campo

November 1	Algeria	26 – 27	Egypt	Ginásio Adib Moyses Dib, São Bernardo do Campo
November 1		(10–16)		Ginásio Adib Moyses Dib, São Bernardo do Campo

November 1	Brazil	25 – 24	Argentina	Ginásio Adib Moyses Dib, São Bernardo do Campo
November 1		(12–13)		Ginásio Adib Moyses Dib, São Bernardo do Campo

== Final standing ==
Rank	Team
Gold medal	Brazil
Silver medal	Egypt
Bronze medal	Argentina
4	Algeria
