= 2015 Handball Super Cup =

Tournament details
- Host country: Germany
- Venue(s): 3 (in 3 host cities)
- Dates: 6–8 November
- Teams: 4 (from 2 confederations)

Final positions
- Champions: Germany (7th title)
- Runner-up: Slovenia
- Third place: Brazil
- Fourth place: Serbia

Tournament statistics
- Matches played: 6
- Goals scored: 341 (56.83 per match)
- Top scorer(s): Gašper Marguč (SLO) (17 goals)

The 2015 Handball Super Cup was the 19th and final iteration of the Super Cup, a biennial men's handball tournament organized by the German Handball Association. It was held during 6–8 November 2015 at the cities of Flensburg, Hamburg, and Kiel. Germany won the tournament ahead of Slovenia.

== Results ==
| Team | Pld | W | D | L | GF | GA | GD | Pts |
|---|---|---|---|---|---|---|---|---|
| Germany | 3 | 3 | 0 | 0 | 97 | 74 | 23 | 6 |
| Slovenia | 3 | 2 | 0 | 1 | 89 | 79 | 10 | 4 |
| Brazil | 3 | 1 | 0 | 2 | 79 | 96 | -17 | 2 |
| Serbia | 3 | 0 | 0 | 3 | 76 | 92 | -16 | 0 |

== Round robin ==
| 6 November 2015; 17:45 | Germany | 29–20 | Brazil | Flens-Arena, Flensburg |
| 6 November 2015; 17:45 | | (15–12) | | Flens-Arena, Flensburg |

| 6 November 2015; 20:00 | Serbia | 21–23 | Slovenia | Flens-Arena, Flensburg |
| 6 November 2015; 20:00 | | (11–12) | | Flens-Arena, Flensburg |

| 7 November 2015; 15:30 | Germany | 37–26 | Serbia | Barclays Arena, Hamburg |
| 7 November 2015; 15:30 | | (20–08) | | Barclays Arena, Hamburg |

| 7 November 2015; 17:45 | Brazil | 27–38 | Slovenia | Barclays Arena, Hamburg |
| 7 November 2015; 17:45 | | (14–18) | | Barclays Arena, Hamburg |

| 8 November 2015; 12:30 | Brazil | 32–29 | Serbia | Wunderino Arena, Kiel |
| 8 November 2015; 12:30 | | (13–14) | | Wunderino Arena, Kiel |

| 8 November 2015; 15:00 | Germany | 30–28 | Slovenia | Wunderino Arena, Kiel |
| 8 November 2015; 15:00 | | (17–11) | | Wunderino Arena, Kiel |

== Final standing ==
| Rank | Team |
|---|---|
| Gold medal | Germany |
| Silver medal | Slovenia |
| Bronze medal | Brazil |
| 4 | Serbia |
