= 2019 Gjensidige Cup =

Friendly handball tournament organised by the Norwegian Handball Federation

Tournament details
- Host country: Norway
- Venue(s): 2 (in 1 host city)
- Dates: 3–6 January
- Teams: 4 (from 2 confederations)

Final positions
- Champions: Norway
- Runner-up: Iceland
- Third place: Brazil
- Fourth place: Netherlands

Tournament statistics
- Matches played: 6
- Goals scored: 356 (59.33 per match)
- Attendance: 11,049 (1,842 per match)
- Top scorer(s): (Netherlands) Kay Smits (20 goals)

The 2019 Gjensidige Cup held in Oslo at the Oslo Spektrum and the Nordstrand Arena between 3–6 January was a friendly handball tournament organised by the Norwegian Handball Federation as a preparation of the host nation to the 2019 World Men's Handball Championship.

== Results ==
| Team | Pld | W | D | L | GF | GA | GD | Pts |
|---|---|---|---|---|---|---|---|---|
| Norway | 3 | 3 | 0 | 0 | 97 | 80 | +17 | 6 |
| Iceland | 3 | 2 | 0 | 1 | 85 | 83 | +2 | 4 |
| Brazil | 3 | 1 | 0 | 2 | 90 | 95 | –5 | 2 |
| Netherlands | 3 | 0 | 0 | 3 | 84 | 98 | –14 | 0 |

== Round robin ==
All times are local (UTC+01:00).

| January 3; 18:15 | Norway | 31–25 | Iceland | Oslo Spektrum, Oslo; Attendance: 5400 |
| January 3; 18:15 | Sagosen 8 | (16–14) | Gudmundsson, Kristjansson 4 | Oslo Spektrum, Oslo; Attendance: 5400 |
| January 3; 18:15 | 3× (yellow card) 3× (suspension) | Report | 3× (yellow card) 5× (suspension) | Oslo Spektrum, Oslo; Attendance: 5400 |

| January 3; 20:30 | Netherlands | 32–35 | Brazil | Oslo Spektrum, Oslo; Attendance: 200 |
| January 3; 20:30 | Schagen 7 | (14–18) | Borges 5 | Oslo Spektrum, Oslo; Attendance: 200 |
| January 3; 20:30 | 2× (yellow card) | Report | 1× (yellow card) 2× (suspension) | Oslo Spektrum, Oslo; Attendance: 200 |

| January 5; 15:30 | Brazil | 29–33 | Iceland | Nordstrand Arena, Oslo; Attendance: 1000 |
| January 5; 15:30 | Chiuffa 6 | (13–17) | Sigurðsson 7 | Nordstrand Arena, Oslo; Attendance: 1000 |
| January 5; 15:30 | 2× (yellow card) 2× (suspension) | Report | 1× (yellow card) 5× (suspension) | Nordstrand Arena, Oslo; Attendance: 1000 |

| January 5; 18:15 | Norway | 36–29 | Netherlands | Nordstrand Arena, Oslo; Attendance: 1900 |
| January 5; 18:15 | Blonz 7 | (16–15) | Smits 7 | Nordstrand Arena, Oslo; Attendance: 1900 |
| January 5; 18:15 | 3× (yellow card) 1× (suspension) | Report | 2× (yellow card) 1× (suspension) | Nordstrand Arena, Oslo; Attendance: 1900 |

| January 6; 15:30 | Iceland | 27–23 | Netherlands | Nordstrand Arena, Oslo; Attendance: 649 |
| January 6; 15:30 | Gunnarsson 7 | (14–12) | Smits 9 | Nordstrand Arena, Oslo; Attendance: 649 |
| January 6; 15:30 | 2× (yellow card) 3× (suspension) | Report | 3× (yellow card) 1× (suspension) | Nordstrand Arena, Oslo; Attendance: 649 |

| January 6; 18:15 | Norway | 30–26 | Brazil | Nordstrand Arena, Oslo; Attendance: 1900 |
| January 6; 18:15 | Sagosen, Myrhol 7 | (19–16) | Teixeira 4 | Nordstrand Arena, Oslo; Attendance: 1900 |
| January 6; 18:15 | 3× (yellow card) 2× (suspension) | Report | 2× (yellow card) 2× (suspension) | Nordstrand Arena, Oslo; Attendance: 1900 |

== Final standing ==
| Rank | Team |
|---|---|
| Gold medal | Norway |
| 2 | Iceland |
| 3 | Brazil |
| 4 | Netherlands |
