= Supercup (handball tournament) =

International men's handball tournament

The Supercup was an international men's handball tournament, that was hosted by the German Handball Association from 1979 to 2015. The tournament was usually hosted biannually between the end of October and the beginning of November. Originally the invitees were former Olympics, European and World champions. It was abolished in 2015 due to lack of spectators.

== Results ==
Year	First place	Second Place	Third place
1979	West Germany	Romania	Soviet Union
1981	Soviet Union	West Germany	(Socialist Federal Republic of Yugoslavia) Yugoslavia
1983	Romania	Soviet Union	(Socialist Federal Republic of Yugoslavia) Yugoslavia
1985	Soviet Union	East Germany	West Germany
1987	West Germany	Soviet Union	East Germany
1989	Soviet Union	East Germany	Romania
1991	Spain	Soviet Union	Sweden
1993	Sweden	Germany	Switzerland
1995	Russia	Germany	Sweden
1998	Germany	France	Russia
1999	Russia	Croatia	Sweden
2001	Germany	Russia	Sweden
2003	Spain	Germany	Sweden
2005	Sweden	France	Russia
2007	Poland	Sweden	Germany
2009	Germany	Denmark	Sweden
2011	Spain	Sweden	Denmark
2013	Germany	Poland	Sweden
2015	Germany	Slovenia	Brazil

== Number of titles ==
Rank	Country	Gold	Silver	Bronze
1	Germany	7	4	2
2	Soviet Union / Russia	5	4	3
3	Spain	3	0	0
4	Sweden	2	2	7
5	Romania	1	1	1
6	Poland	1	1	0
7	East Germany	0	2	1
8	France	0	2	0
9	Denmark	0	1	1
10	Croatia	0	1	0
10	Slovenia	0	1	0
12	(Socialist Federal Republic of Yugoslavia) Yugoslavia	0	0	2
13	Brazil	0	0	1
13	Switzerland	0	0	1
