= 2017 Women's Four Nations Tournament =

Tournament details
- Host country: Brazil
- Venue(s): 1 (in 1 host city)
- Dates: 9–11 June
- Teams: 4 (from 2 confederations)

Final positions
- Champions: Brazil (2nd title)
- Runners-up: Portugal
- Third place: Chile
- Fourth place: Dominican Republic

Tournament statistics
- Matches played: 6
- Goals scored: 307 (51.17 per match)

The 2017 Women's Four Nations Tournament (Torneio Quatro Nações) in Portuguese, was the 2nd edition of the Women's Four Nations Tournament held in São Bernardo do Campo, Brazil between 9–11 June as a Women's friendly handball tournament organised by the Brazilian Handball Confederation.

== Results ==
Team	Pld	W	D	L	GF	GA	GD	Pts
Brazil	3	3	0	0	111	51	60	6
Portugal	3	2	0	1	86	75	11	4
Chile	3	1	0	2	66	92	–26	2
Dominican Republic	3	0	0	3	44	89	–45	0

== Round robin ==
All times are local (UTC−03:00).

June 9; 19:00	Portugal	26–14	Dominican Republic	Ginásio Adib Moyses Dib, São Bernardo do Campo
June 9; 19:00		(13–7)		Ginásio Adib Moyses Dib, São Bernardo do Campo

June 9; 21:00	Brazil	40–13	Chile	Ginásio Adib Moyses Dib, São Bernardo do Campo
June 9; 21:00		(19–8)		Ginásio Adib Moyses Dib, São Bernardo do Campo

June 10; 15:30	Portugal	31–26	Chile	Ginásio Adib Moyses Dib, São Bernardo do Campo
June 10; 15:30		(14–14)		Ginásio Adib Moyses Dib, São Bernardo do Campo

June 10; 18:00	Brazil	36–9	Dominican Republic	Ginásio Adib Moyses Dib, São Bernardo do Campo
June 10; 18:00		(14–5)		Ginásio Adib Moyses Dib, São Bernardo do Campo

June 11; 09:30	Brazil	35–29	Portugal	Ginásio Adib Moyses Dib, São Bernardo do Campo
June 11; 09:30		(17–13)		Ginásio Adib Moyses Dib, São Bernardo do Campo

June 11; 14:30	Chile	27–21	Dominican Republic	Ginásio Adib Moyses Dib, São Bernardo do Campo
June 11; 14:30		(12–10)		Ginásio Adib Moyses Dib, São Bernardo do Campo

== Final standing ==
Rank	Team
Gold medal	Brazil
2	Portugal
3	Chile
4	Dominican Republic
