= João Pedro Silva (handballer) =

Brazilian handball player (born 1994)

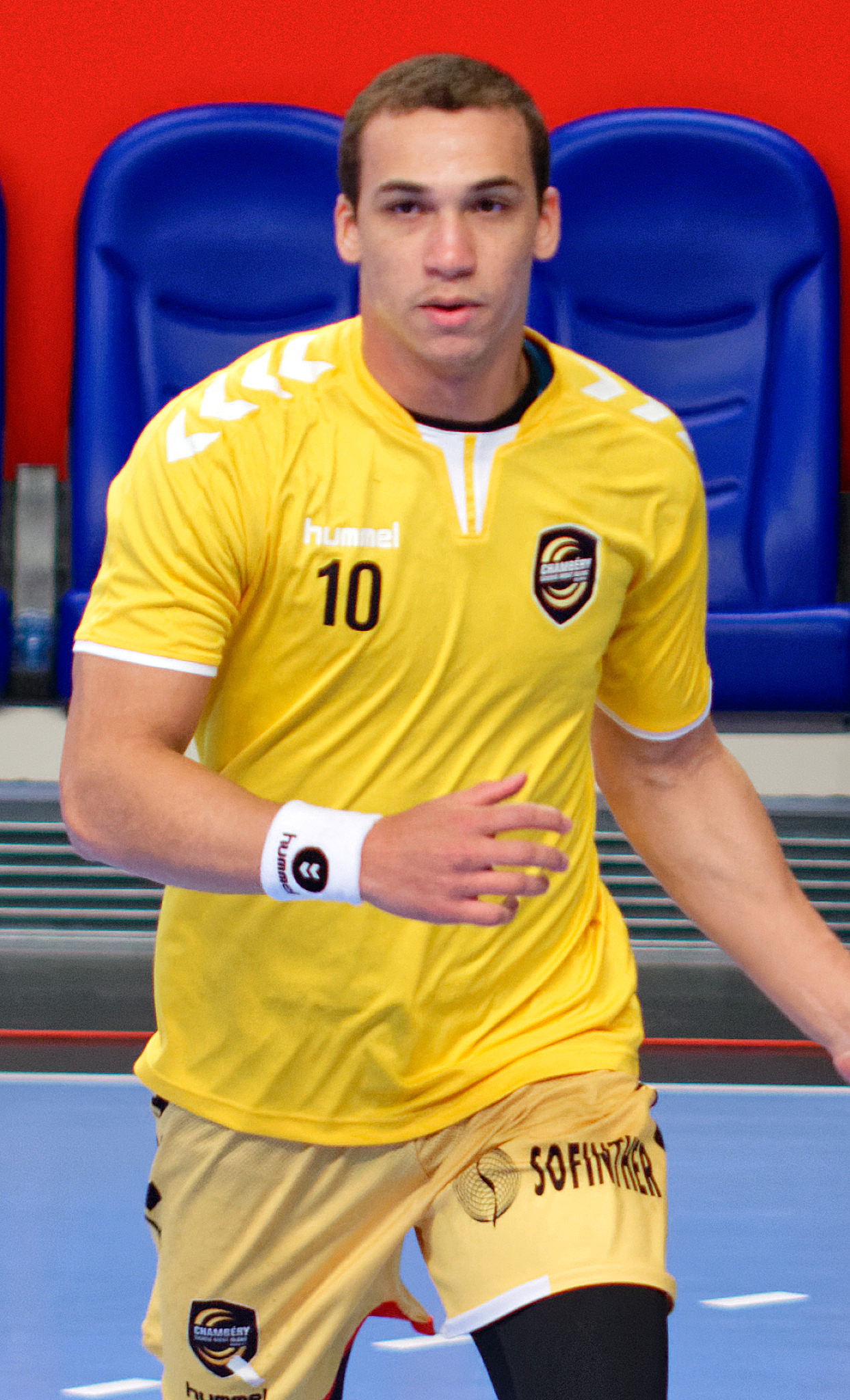
- Silva with Chambéry in 2015

Personal information
- Full name: João Pedro Francisco da Silva
- Born: 29 January 1994 (age 32) Nova Iguaçu, Brazil
- Height: 1.90 m (6 ft 3 in)

Sport
- Sport: Handball
- Position: Centre back
- Current club: RK Vardar 1961
- Number: 14

Senior clubs
- Years: Team
- –2012: EC Pinheiros
- 2013–2014: FC Barcelona B
- 2014–2015: Ademar León
- 2015–2017: Chambéry SMB HB
- 2017–2019: S.L. Benfica
- 2019–2020: Steaua București
- 2020–2022: Ángel Ximénez Puente Genil
- 2022–2023: Dinamo București
- 2023–2024: CSM București
- 2024–12/2025: RK Vojvodina
- 01/2026–: RK Vardar 1961
National team
Years	Team	Apps	(Gls)
–	Brazil	53	(114)
Medal record
Pan American Games
Silver medal – second place	2023 Santiago	Team
Bronze medal – third place	2019 Lima	Team
Pan American Championship
Gold medal – first place	2016 Argentina
South and Central American Championship
Gold medal – first place	2022 Brazil

João Pedro Francisco da Silva (born 29 January 1994) is a Brazilian handball player for RK Vardar 1961 and the Brazil national team.

== Honours ==
Benfica

- Portuguese Cup: 2017–18
- Portuguese Super Cup: 2018

Individual

- 2017 Four Nations Tournament: MVP
- 2022 South and Central American Men's Handball Championship: Best centre back
