= 2017 Yellow Cup =

Tournament details
- Host country: Switzerland
- Venue(s): 1 (in 1 host city)
- Dates: 06–08 January
- Teams: 4 (from 2 confederations)

Final positions
- Champions: Switzerland
- Runner-up: Brazil
- Third place: Romania
- Fourth place: Slovakia

Tournament statistics
- Matches played: 6
- Goals scored: 298 (49.67 per match)
- Top scorer(s): (Slovakia) Dominik Krok (23 goals)

The 2017 Yellow Cup was the 45th edition of the Yellow Cup, held in Winterthur, Switzerland between 06–8 January at the Eulachhalle as a friendly handball tournament organised by the Yellow Winterthur handball club.

== Results ==
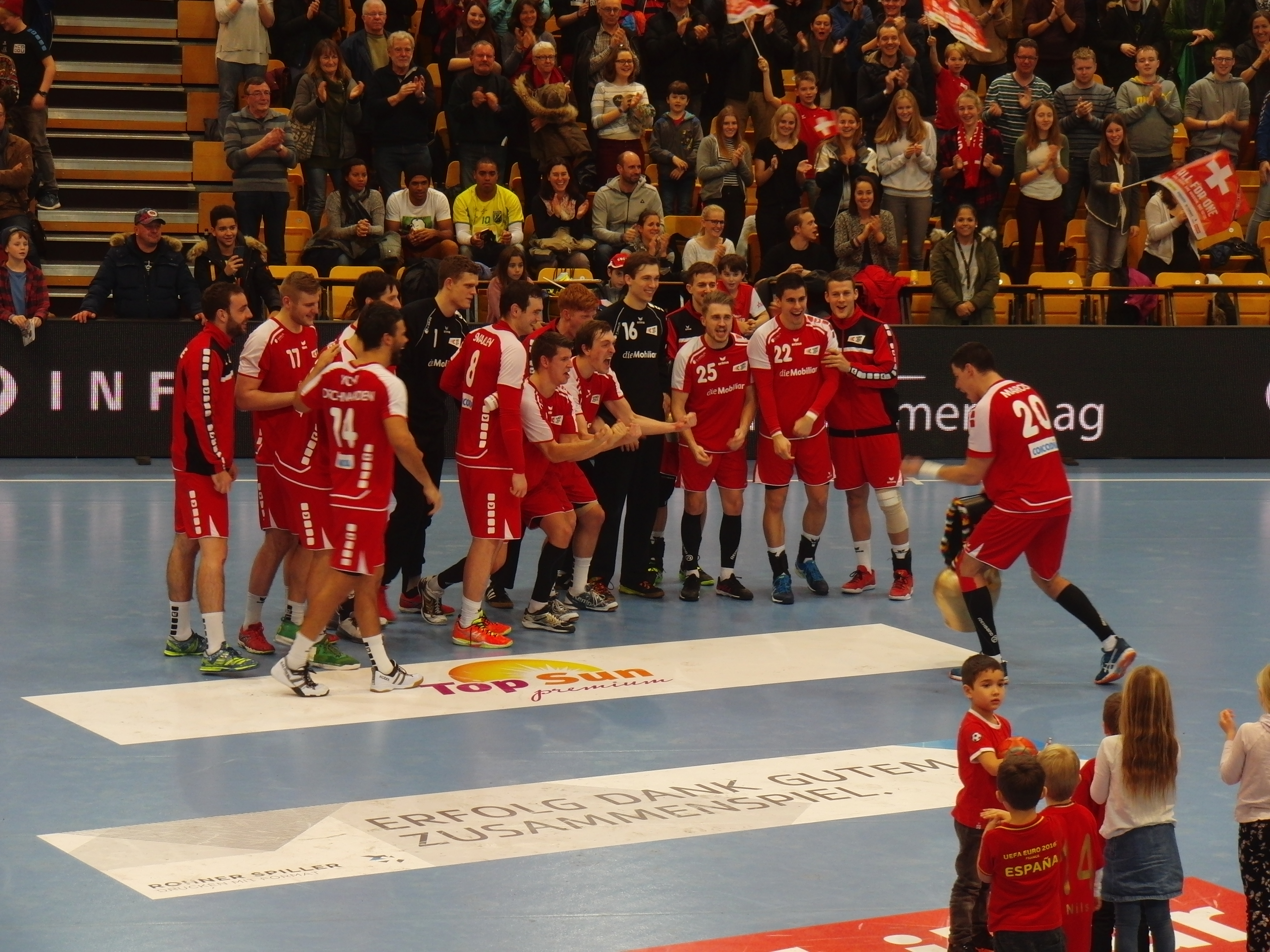
The swiss national team after the tournament win.

Team	Pld	W	D	L	GF	GA	GD	Pts
Switzerland	3	3	0	0	81	62	+19	6
Brazil	3	2	0	1	80	71	+9	4
Romania	3	1	0	2	73	76	–3	2
Slovakia	3	0	0	3	64	89	–25	0

== Round robin ==
All times are local (UTC+01:00).

January 6; 18:30	Switzerland	29–18	Slovakia	Eulachhalle, Winterthur
January 6; 18:30		(14–6)		Eulachhalle, Winterthur

January 6; 21:00	Brazil	25–24	Romania	Eulachhalle, Winterthur
January 6; 21:00		(13–13)		Eulachhalle, Winterthur

January 7; 16:30	Slovakia	20–30	Brazil	Eulachhalle, Winterthur
January 7; 16:30		(8–15)		Eulachhalle, Winterthur

January 7; 19:00	Switzerland	25–19	Romania	Eulachhalle, Winterthur
January 7; 19:00		(14–10)		Eulachhalle, Winterthur

January 8; 13:30	Romania	30–26	Slovakia	Eulachhalle, Winterthur
January 8; 13:30		(14–14)		Eulachhalle, Winterthur

January 8; 16:15	Switzerland	27–25	Brazil	Eulachhalle, Winterthur
January 8; 16:15		(14–14)		Eulachhalle, Winterthur

== Final standing ==
Rank	Team
Gold medal	Switzerland
2	Brazil
3	Romania
4	Slovakia
