= Alexander Blonz =

Norwegian handball player (born 2000)

Personal information
- Full name: Alexander Christoffersen Blonz
- Nationality: Norwegian; French
- Born: Alexandre Christoffersen Blonz; 17 April 2000 (age 26) Clamart, France
- Height: 1.89 m (6 ft 2 in)

Sport
- Sport: Handball
- Position: Left wing
- Current club: Aalborg Håndbold
- Number: 17

Senior clubs
- Years: Team
- 2016–2019: Viking HK
- 2019–2021: Elverum Håndball
- 2021–2023: SC Pick Szeged
- 2023–2025: GOG Håndbold
- 2025–: Aalborg Håndbold
National team
Years	Team	Apps	(Gls)
2019–	Norway	108	(285)
Medal record
World Championship
Silver medal – second place	2019 Germany/Denmark
European Championship
Bronze medal – third place	2020 Sweden/Austria/Norway

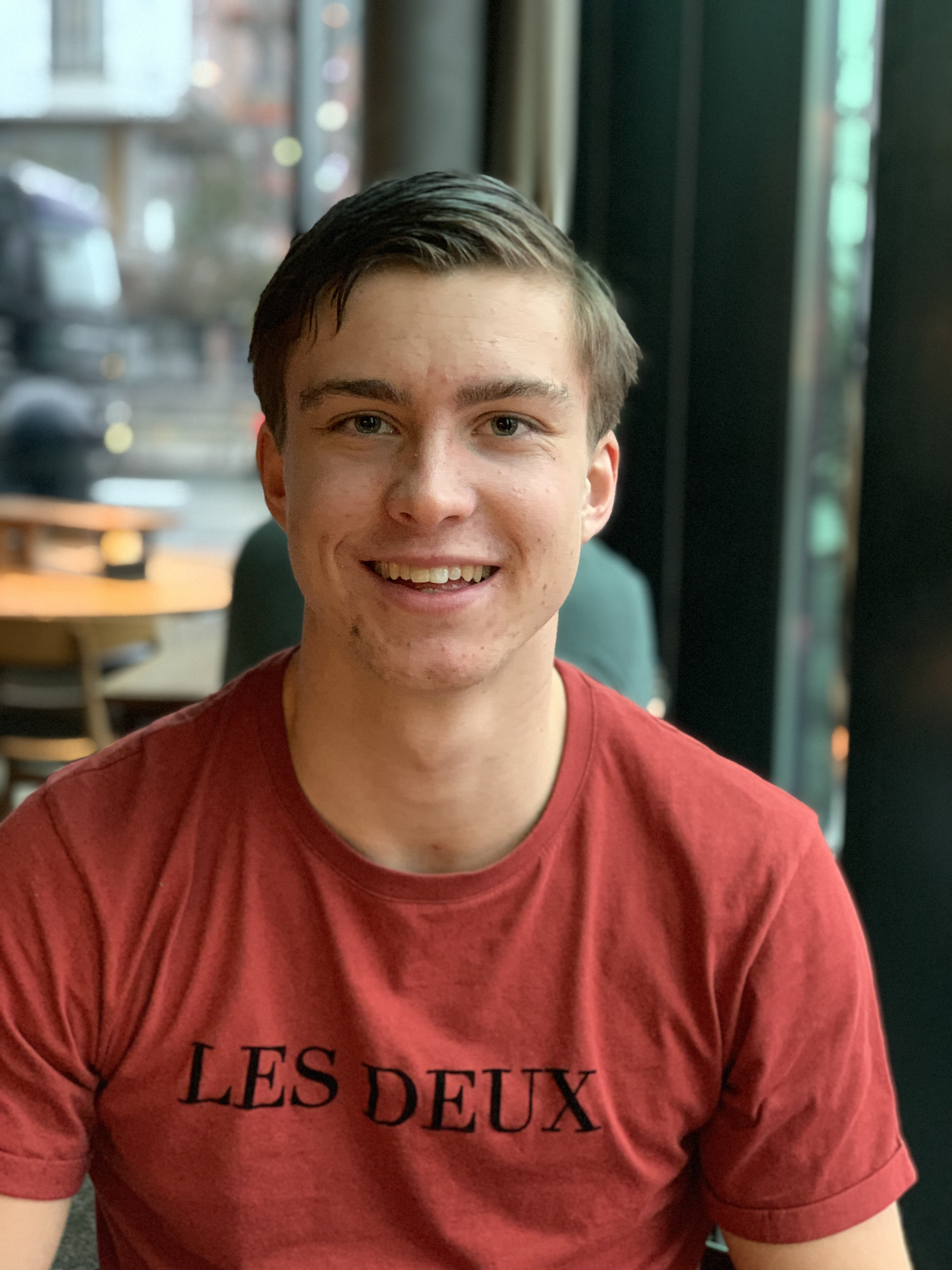

Alexander Christoffersen Blonz (born 17 April 2000) is a Norwegian handball player for Aalborg Håndbold and the Norwegian national team.

He made his international debut during the Gjensidige Cup 2019 against Netherlands where he scored 7 goals and was elected best player of the game.

He made his World Championship debut in the 2019 World Men's Handball Championship against Tunisia. Four days later and in only his fourth game with the Norwegian handball national team, he scored 8 goals against Chile and was elected best player of the game.

He represented Norway at the 2021 World Men's Handball Championship.

His first name is Alexandre, due to his French heritage, but he uses the Norwegian spelling of Alexander.

== Achievements ==
- World Championship:
  - Silver: 2019
- European Championship:
  - Bronze: 2020
- Norwegian League:
  - Winner: 2019/2020, 2020/2021
- Norwegian Cup:
  - Winner: 2019, 2020
- Hungarian League:
  - Winner: 2021/2022
- Danish Championship:
  - Winner:2026

== Individual awards ==
- Best Rookie of Eliteserien: 2019/2020
- Best World Young Left Wing (generation 1998 and younger): 2019/2020
