= 2015 Four Nations Tournament =

- tournament logo

Tournament details
- Host country: Brazil
- Venue: 1 (in 1 host city)
- Dates: 10–13 June
- Teams: 4 (from 2 confederations)

Final positions
- Champions: Brazil (2nd title)
- Runners-up: Tunisia
- Third place: Cuba
- Fourth place: Chile

Tournament statistics
- Matches played: 6
- Goals scored: 358 (59.67 per match)
- Top scorers: Angel Hernandez (CUB) (21 goals)

Awards
- Best player: Amri Nidhal (TUN)

The 2015 Four Nations Tournament (Torneio Quatro Nações) in Portuguese, was the second edition of the Four Nations Tournament held in João Pessoa, Brazil between 10–13 June as a Men's friendly handball tournament organised by the Brazilian Handball Confederation.

== Results ==
Team	Pld	W	D	L	GF	GA	GD	Pts
Brazil	3	3	0	0	108	81	27	6
Tunisia	3	2	0	1	87	82	5	4
Cuba	3	1	0	2	95	106	-11	2
Chile	3	0	0	3	68	89	-21	0

== Round robin ==
June 10; 20:00	Chile	18 - 25	Tunisia	Ginásio Ronaldo Cunha Lima, João Pessoa
June 10; 20:00		(10-15)		Ginásio Ronaldo Cunha Lima, João Pessoa

June 10; 22:00	Brazil	43 - 32	Cuba	Ginásio Ronaldo Cunha Lima, João Pessoa
June 10; 22:00		(24-16)		Ginásio Ronaldo Cunha Lima, João Pessoa

June 11; 15:00	Tunisia	34 - 33	Cuba	Ginásio Ronaldo Cunha Lima, João Pessoa
June 11; 15:00		(16-18)		Ginásio Ronaldo Cunha Lima, João Pessoa

June 11; 17:30	Brazil	34 - 21	Chile	Ginásio Ronaldo Cunha Lima, João Pessoa
June 11; 17:30		(18-12)		Ginásio Ronaldo Cunha Lima, João Pessoa

June 13; 09:00	Cuba	30 - 29	Chile	Ginásio Ronaldo Cunha Lima, João Pessoa
June 13; 09:00		(12-11)		Ginásio Ronaldo Cunha Lima, João Pessoa

June 13; 11:00	Brazil	31 - 28	Tunisia	Ginásio Ronaldo Cunha Lima, João Pessoa
June 13; 11:00		(16-16)		Ginásio Ronaldo Cunha Lima, João Pessoa

== Final standing ==
Rank	Team
Gold medal	Brazil
2	Tunisia
3	Cuba
4	Chile
