= 2016 Four Nations Tournament =

Tournament details
- Host country: Brazil
- Venue: 1 (in 1 host city)
- Dates: 4–6 November
- Teams: 4 (from 1 confederation)

Final positions
- Champions: Brazil (3rd title)
- Runners-up: Chile
- Third place: Cuba
- Fourth place: Canada

Tournament statistics
- Matches played: 6
- Goals scored: 373 (62.17 per match)
- Top scorers: Omar Toledano (CUB) (21 goals)

The 2016 Four Nations Tournament (Torneio Quatro Nações) in Portuguese, was the third edition of the Four Nations Tournament held in São Bernardo do Campo, Brazil between 4–6 November as a Men's friendly handball tournament organised by the Brazilian Handball Confederation.

== Results ==
| Team | Pld | W | D | L | GF | GA | GD | Pts |
|---|---|---|---|---|---|---|---|---|
| Brazil | 3 | 3 | 0 | 0 | 131 | 58 | 73 | 6 |
| Chile | 3 | 2 | 0 | 1 | 103 | 85 | 18 | 4 |
| Cuba | 3 | 1 | 0 | 2 | 76 | 112 | –36 | 2 |
| Canada | 3 | 0 | 0 | 3 | 63 | 118 | –55 | 0 |

== Round robin ==
| November 4; 17:30 | Chile | 37–24 | Cuba | Ginásio Adib Moyses Dib, São Bernardo do Campo |
| November 4; 17:30 | | (17–14) | | Ginásio Adib Moyses Dib, São Bernardo do Campo |

| November 4; 19:30 | Brazil | 46–12 | Canada | Ginásio Adib Moyses Dib, São Bernardo do Campo |
| November 4; 19:30 | | (24–4) | | Ginásio Adib Moyses Dib, São Bernardo do Campo |

| November 5; 17:00 | Chile | 37–21 | Canada | Ginásio Adib Moyses Dib, São Bernardo do Campo |
| November 5; 17:00 | | (17–10) | | Ginásio Adib Moyses Dib, São Bernardo do Campo |

| November 5; 19:00 | Brazil | 45–17 | Cuba | Ginásio Adib Moyses Dib, São Bernardo do Campo |
| November 5; 19:00 | | (27–13) | | Ginásio Adib Moyses Dib, São Bernardo do Campo |

| November 6; 10:00 | Brazil | 40–29 | Chile | Ginásio Adib Moyses Dib, São Bernardo do Campo |
| November 6; 10:00 | | (17–16) | | Ginásio Adib Moyses Dib, São Bernardo do Campo |

| November 6; 12:15 | Cuba | 35–30 | Canada | Ginásio Adib Moyses Dib, São Bernardo do Campo |
| November 6; 12:15 | | (16–13) | | Ginásio Adib Moyses Dib, São Bernardo do Campo |

== Final standing ==
| Rank | Team |
|---|---|
| Gold medal | Brazil |
| 2 | Chile |
| 3 | Cuba |
| 4 | Canada |
