= Brazil men's national handball team =

Brazil national handball team

Brazil

Information
- Association: Confederação Brasileira de Handebol
- Coach: Marcus Oliveira
- Assistant coach: André Mendes
- Captain: Thiagus dos Santos

Colours
1st	2nd

Results

Summer Olympics
- Appearances: 5 (First in 1992)
- Best result: 7th (2016)

World Championship
- Appearances: 17 (First in 1958)
- Best result: 7th (2025)

Pan American Championship
- Appearances: 18 (First in 1980)
- Best result: (gold) 1st (2006, 2008, 2016)
- Last updated on Unknown.

The Brazil men's national handball team is the national handball team of Brazil and is governed by the Confederação Brasileira de Handebol.

== Competitions record ==
=== Olympic Games ===
Games	Round	Position	Pld	W	D	L	GF	GA	GD
(Germany) 1936 Berlin	did not enter								
Not held from 1948 to 1968
(West Germany) 1972 Munich	did not qualify								
(Canada) 1976 Montreal	did not qualify								
(Soviet Union) 1980 Moscow	did not qualify								
(United States) 1984 Los Angeles	did not qualify								
(South Korea) 1988 Seoul	did not qualify								
(Spain) 1992 Barcelona	match for 11th place	12th of 12	6	0	0	6	120	152	−32
(United States) 1996 Atlanta	match for 11th place	11th of 12	6	1	1	4	141	170	−29
(Australia) 2000 Sydney	did not qualify								
(Greece) 2004 Athens	Match for 9th place	10th of 12	6	1	0	5	130	162	−32
(China) 2008 Beijing	preliminary round	11th of 12	5	1	0	4	129	153	−24
(United Kingdom) 2012 London	did not qualify								
(Brazil) 2016 Rio de Janeiro	Quarter-finals	7th of 12	6	2	1	3	168	184	−16
(Japan) 2020 Tokyo	preliminary round	10th of 12	5	1	0	4	128	145	−17
(France) 2024 Paris	did not qualify								
Total	6/15		34	6	2	26	816	966	-150

=== World Championship ===
Year	Round	Position	GP	W	D*	L	GF	GA
(Nazi Germany) 1938	did not enter							
(Sweden) 1954	did not enter							
(East Germany) 1958	Preliminary round	15th	3	0	0	3	33	78
(West Germany) 1961	did not enter							
(Czechoslovakia) 1964	did not enter							
(Sweden) 1967	did not enter							
(France) 1970	did not enter							
(East Germany) 1974	did not enter							
(Denmark) 1978	did not enter							
(West Germany) 1982	did not enter							
(Switzerland) 1986	did not enter							
(Czechoslovakia) 1990	did not enter							
(Sweden) 1993	did not enter							
(Iceland) 1995	Preliminary round	24th	5	0	0	5	96	140
(Japan) 1997	Preliminary round	24th	5	0	0	5	65	132
(Egypt) 1999	Round of 16	16th	6	2	0	4	125	160
(France) 2001	Preliminary round	19th	5	1	0	4	108	124
(Portugal) 2003	Preliminary round	22nd	5	0	1	4	118	140
(Tunisia) 2005	Preliminary round	19th	5	1	0	4	104	146
(Germany) 2007	Presidents cup	19th	6	3	0	3	164	162
(Croatia) 2009	Presidents cup	21st	9	3	0	6	238	270
(Sweden) 2011	Presidents cup	21st	7	2	0	5	196	211
(Spain) 2013	Round of 16	13th	6	3	0	3	148	154
(Qatar) 2015	Round of 16	16th	6	2	0	4	171	169
(France) 2017	Round of 16	16th	6	2	0	4	148	174
(Denmark) / (Germany) 2019	Main round	9th	8	5	0	3	212	220
(Egypt) 2021	Main round	18th	6	1	2	3	168	171
(Poland) (Sweden) 2023	Main round	17th	6	2	1	3	173	175
(Croatia) (Denmark) (Norway) 2025	Quarter-finals	7th	7	5	0	2	188	186
(Germany) 2027	Qualified							
(France) (Germany) 2029	TBD							
(Denmark) (Iceland) (Norway) 2031	TBD							
Total	18/32		101	32	4	65	2455	2812

=== Pan American Games ===
Games	Round	Position	Pld	W	D	L	GF	GA	GD
(United States) 1987 Indianapolis	bronze medal match	3rd	5	3	0	2	122	114	8
(Cuba) 1991 Havana	gold medal match	2nd	5	2	0	3	114	104	10
(Argentina) 1995 Mar del Plata	gold medal match	2nd	6	4	0	2	171	116	55
(Canada) 1999 Winnipeg	gold medal match	2nd	4	2	1	1	104	83	21
(Dominican Republic) 2003 Santo Domingo	gold medal match	1st	5	5	0	0	170	97	73
(Brazil) 2007 Rio de Janeiro	gold medal match	1st	5	5	0	0	157	96	61
(Mexico) 2011 Guadalajara	gold medal match	2nd	5	4	0	1	183	97	86
(Canada) 2015 Toronto	gold medal match	1st	5	5	0	0	183	104	79
(Peru) 2019 Lima	bronze medal match	3rd	5	4	0	1	169	117	52
(Chile) 2023 Santiago	gold medal match	2nd	5	4	0	1	182	126	56
Total	10/10	3 Titles	49	38	1	11	1545	1054	491

=== Pan American Championship ===
Year	Round	Position	GP	W	D*	L	GF	GA
(Mexico) 1980	round robin	4	5	2	1	2	90	92
(Argentina) 1981	final	2	4	2	0	2	106	113
(United States) 1983	round robin	4	4	2	0	2		
(Brazil) 1985	round robin	3	4	2	0	2	89	66
(Cuba) 1989	round robin	2	5	4	0	1	128	85
(Brazil) 1994	round robin	2	6	5	0	1	145	67
(United States) 1996	3rd place match	4	5	2	0	3	132	95
(Cuba) 1998	3rd place match	3	7	5	0	2	215	148
(Brazil) 2000	3rd place match	3	5	4	0	1	183	85
(Argentina) 2002	final	2	5	3	0	2	143	86
(Chile) 2004	final	2	5	4	0	1	147	72
(Brazil) 2006	final	1	5	5	0	0	183	104
(Brazil) 2008	final	1	4	4	0	0	124	80
(Chile) 2010	final	2	5	4	0	1	160	115
(Argentina) 2012	final	2	5	4	0	1	174	94
(Uruguay) 2014	final	2	5	4	0	1	169	102
(Argentina) 2016	final	1	7	7	0	0	265	122
(Greenland) 2018	final	2	7	6	0	1	251	149
Total	18/18	3 titles	93	69	1	23	3031	1795

=== South and Central American Championship ===
Year	Round	Position	GP	W	D*	L	GF	GA
(Brazil) 2020	final	2	5	4	0	1	210	87
(Brazil) 2022	final	1	5	5	0	0	194	91
(Argentina) 2024	final	1	5	5	0	0	207	103
(Paraguay) 2026	final	2	5	4	0	1	198	104
Total	4/4	2 titles	20	18	0	2	809	385

=== Other competitions ===
South American Games
Games	Round	Position	Pld	W	D	L	GF	GA	GD
(Brazil) 2002 São Bernardo do Campo	Gold medal match	2nd	5	3	0	2	138	76	62
(Argentina) 2006 Mar del Plata	did not enter								
(Colombia) 2010 Medellin	round robin	1st	4	4	0	0	146	90	56
(Chile) 2014 Santiago	gold medal match	1st	5	5	0	0	172	97	75
(Bolivia) 2018 Cochabamba	gold medal match	1st	5	5	0	0	210	96	114
Total	4/5	3 Titles	19	17	0	2	666	359	307

Olympic qualification tournament
Tournament	Outcome	Position	Pld	W	D	L	GF	GA
(Sweden) 2012	not qualified	3rd	3	1	0	2	75	81
(Montenegro) 2021	Qualified	2nd	3	2	0	1	76	80
(Spain) 2024	not qualified	3rd	3	1	0	2	77	79

- 2014 Four Nations Tournament –
- 2015 International Handball Tournament of Poland –
- 2015 Four Nations Tournament –
- 2015 Handball Super Cup – 3rd
- 2016 International Tournament of Spain – 3rd
- 2016 Qatar International Handball Tournament – 2nd
- 2016 Four Nations Tournament –
- 2017 Yellow Cup – 2nd
- 2017 Four Nations Tournament –
- 2019 Gjensidige Cup – 3rd
- 2022 4 Nations Cup (Poland) – 4th
- 2023 Gjensidige Cup – 3rd

== Team ==
=== Current squad ===
Squad for the 2025 World Men's Handball Championship.

Head coach: Marcus Oliveira

No.	Pos.	Name	Date of birth (age)	Height	App.	Goals	Club
7	LW	Joel Rodrigues	24 February 2001 (age 25)	1.83 m	0	0	(Brazil) Praia Clube/Colégio Nacional
14	LB	Thiagus dos Santos	25 January 1989 (age 37)	1.98 m	169	234	(Spain) Barça
15	LB	Leandro Monte da Silva	9 March 1998 (age 28)	1.91 m	0	0	(Saudi Arabia) Mudhar
16	GK	Rangel da Rosa	11 May 1996 (age 30)	1.89 m	51	3	(France) Saint-Raphaël Var Handball
26	LB	Bryan Monte	6 April 2003 (age 23)	2.02 m	9	26	(France) Montpellier Handball
27	RW	Marcos da Silva	1 January 2001 (age 25)	1.86 m	0	0	(Brazil) Pinheiros
37	LB	Haniel Langaro	7 March 1995 (age 31)	1.97 m	93	398	(Romania) Dinamo București
47	P	Renan Pinheiro	19 April 2005 (age 21)	2.02 m	0	0	(Brazil) Pinheiros
57	RB	Vinícios Carvalho	6 March 1997 (age 29)	1.88 m	3	7	(France) C' Chartres Métropole Handball
75	CB	Denys Barros	2 January 1994 (age 32)	1.86 m	0	0	(Spain) AD Ciudad de Guadalajara
77	RW	Rudolph Hackbarth	10 March 1994 (age 32)	1.89 m	65	159	(Spain) BM Ciudad Encantada
80	P	Edy Silva	19 June 1998 (age 28)	1.90 m	3	9	(Portugal) Sporting CP
82	CB	Tarcísio Oliveira	25 January 2000 (age 26)	1.87 m	0	0	(Spain) BM Atlético Valladolid
88	P	Guilherme Borges	5 February 1999 (age 27)	1.93 m	0	0	(France) Istres Provence Handball
94	CB	Acácio Filho	26 January 1994 (age 32)	1.91 m	1	2	(Qatar) Al Arabi SC
95	RB	Gustavo Rodrigues	9 April 1995 (age 31)	1.90 m	63	167	(France) Chambéry Handball
97	GK	Mateus Nascimento	7 October 1999 (age 27)	1.88 m	4	0	(Brazil) Pinheiros
99	LW	Jean-Pierre Dupoux	16 August 1991 (age 35)	1.80 m	12	41	Tremblay-en-France Handball

=== Player statistics ===
Most capped players
Player	Games	Position
Felipe Borges	228	W
Bruno Souza	196	OB
Fábio Chiuffa	171	W
Fernando Pacheco Filho	148	OB
Vinícius Teixeira	143	P
Thiagus dos Santos	139	OB
Renato Tupan Ruy	133	OB, W
Henrique Teixeira	120	CB
Alexandro Pozzer	108	P
César Almeida	98	GK

Top scorers
Player	Goals	Average	Position
Felipe Borges	801	3.51	W
Bruno Souza	623	3.18	OB
Vinícius Teixeira	550	3.84	P
Fernando Pacheco Filho	455	3.07	OB
Fábio Chiuffa	449	2.63	W
Haniel Langaro	396	3.07	OB
Renato Tupan Ruy	231	1.74	OB, W

=== Notable players ===
- Bruno Souza
- Roberto Casuso

== Youth Teams ==
=== World Juniors Championship ===
- 1991 – 15th
- 1995 – 17th
- 1997 – 16th
- 1999 – 13th
- 2001 – 11th
- 2003 – 8th
- 2005 – 16th
- 2007 – 16th

Year	Round	Position	GP	W	D*	L	GS	GA
(Egypt) 2009	placement matches	9th	9	5	0	4	254	243
(Greece) 2011	placement matches	11th	9	4	0	5	239	252
(Bosnia and Herzegovina) 2013	placement matches	6th	9	4	0	5	220	226
(Brazil) 2015	placement matches	10th	7	3	1	3	221	201

=== Pan American Junior Championship ===
- 1993 –
- 1997 –
- 1999 –
- 2001 –
- 2002 –
- 2005 –
- 2007 –

Year	Round	Position	GP	W	D*	L	GS	GA
(Argentina) 2009	round robin	2nd	5	4	0	1	173	114
(Brazil) 2011	round robin	2nd	5	4	0	1	130	83
(Argentina) 2013	gold medal match	1st	6	6	0	0	226	119
(Brazil) 2015	round robin	1st	5	5	0	0	191	94
