= Great Britain at the 2012 Summer Olympics =

- Flag of the United Kingdom
- IOC code: GBR
- NOC: British Olympic Association

in London 27 July 2012 – 12 August 2012
- Competitors: 541 in 26 sports
- Flag bearers: Chris Hoy (opening); Ben Ainslie (closing)
- Medals Ranked 3rd: Gold 29 Silver 18 Bronze 18 Total 65

Summer Olympics appearances (overview)
- 1896; 1900; 1904; 1908; 1912; 1920; 1924; 1928; 1932; 1936; 1948; 1952; 1956; 1960; 1964; 1968; 1972; 1976; 1980; 1984; 1988; 1992; 1996; 2000; 2004; 2008; 2012; 2016; 2020; 2024; 2028

Other related appearances
- 1906 Intercalated Games

Great Britain and Northern Ireland, represented by the British Olympic Association (BOA), competed at the 2012 Summer Olympics in London, United Kingdom, from 27 July to 12 August 2012 as the host nation and the team of selected athletes was officially known as Team GB. British athletes have competed at every Summer Olympic Games in the modern era, alongside Australia, France and Greece, though Great Britain is the only one to have won at least one gold medal at all of them. London was the first city to host the Summer Olympics on three different occasions, having previously done so in 1908 and 1948. It was joined by Paris in 2024 and will be joined by Los Angeles in 2028 in hosting the Olympic Games for a third time. Team GB, organised by BOA, sent a total of 541 athletes, 279 men and 262 women, to the Games, and won automatic qualification places in all 26 sports.

The government agency UK Sport targeted a total of 48 to 70 medals, with a commitment of at least a minimum amount, one more than the team won at the 2008 Summer Olympics, and a fourth-place finish in the medal table. On 7 August 2012, Great Britain had reached its 48-medal target, and surpassed the 19 gold-medal tally from Beijing the previous Summer Olympics, making it the most successful Olympics since 1908.

Great Britain finished the Summer Olympic Games with a total of 65 medals (29 gold, 17 silver, and 19 bronze; after medal reallocation in men's high jump: 29 gold, 18 silver, and 18 bronze), coming third in the medal table rankings, and fourth in the total number of medal rankings. At least one medal was awarded to Team GB in seventeen sports, eleven of them containing at least one gold. British athletes dominated the medal standings in cycling, wherein they won a total of 12 Olympic medals, including 8 golds, 7 from the 10 track cycling events alone, and in equestrianism, wherein they won 5 medals including 3 golds from 6 events. Great Britain also topped the medal table in triathlon, boxing and rowing. Twelve British athletes won more than a single Olympic medal in London.

Among the nation's medalists were taekwondo jin Jade Jones, triathlete Alistair Brownlee, and slalom canoers Etienne Stott and Tim Baillie, who won Great Britain's first Olympic gold medals in their respective disciplines. Nicola Adams became the first female champion in Olympic boxing history as her sport made its debut at the Games.

Having never won a medal in dressage in Olympic history, British riders dominated the event in 2012, winning 2 golds (both team and individual) and a bronze, Charlotte Dujardin becoming one of five British double gold medal winners. Great Britain was the first nation other than Germany to win the team event since 1980. Andy Murray became the first British tennis player to claim an Olympic title since the sport was reintroduced as a full-medal discipline in 1988; he was also the only British athlete to win two medals in a single day. Double trap shooter Peter Wilson won the nation's first gold medal in his sport for 12 years.

By winning two gold medals in London, track cyclist Chris Hoy emerged as Great Britain's most successful athlete in Olympic history with a total of seven medals, including six golds which surpassed the five golds won by former rower Steve Redgrave. Hoy also tied for the most total Olympic medals for a Briton with road cyclist Bradley Wiggins, who won the gold in the men's time trial. Ben Ainslie became the most successful sailor in Olympic history, after winning his fourth gold medal in the Finn class. With three medals (two golds and one silver) in total, Victoria Pendleton became Great Britain's most successful female Olympic athlete, surpassing the record of two golds and one bronze medal, previously held by Kelly Holmes, and briefly shared with Rebecca Adlington.

For the first time in Olympic history, Great Britain had won a women's rowing gold; in the event, Great Britain secured three of the six gold medals in women's rowing. Heather Stanning and Helen Glover took the first Great Britain gold of the games in the women's pair, and the nation's first ever in women's rowing. Katherine Grainger, winning her first gold medal with Anna Watkins in the women's double sculls, became the first Great Britain female athlete to win four Olympic medals, and at four successive games (having previously won three silver medals). Swimmer Rebecca Adlington equalled the feat of four Olympic medals later on the same day. Sophie Hosking and Katherine Copeland, in the women's lightweight double sculls, completed the hat-trick as part of Super Saturday.

Despite the unprecedented success, Great Britain performed much more poorly in the team sports, winning just a single medal when Great Britain captained by Kate Richardson-Walsh won the bronze medal match against New Zealand 3–1 in the women's field hockey tournament to win the first medal of any colour by a British field hockey team at a Summer Olympics since 1992.

== Medallists ==
The team won 65 medals in total: 29 gold, 17 silver and 19 bronze; after medal reallocation in men's high jump: 29 gold, 18 silver, and 18 bronze. For each gold medallist, a post box was painted gold by Royal Mail in recognition of the achievement, usually in the competitor's home town. A first class stamp depicting each gold medal-winning individual or team was also produced.

The following British competitors won medals at the Games. In the 'by discipline' sections below, medallists' names are in bold.

Medal	Name	Sport	Event	Date
Gold	Helen Glover; Heather Stanning	Rowing	Women's coxless pair	1 August
Gold	Bradley Wiggins	Cycling	Men's time trial	1 August
Gold	Tim Baillie; Etienne Stott	Canoeing	Men's slalom C-2	2 August
Gold	Peter Wilson	Shooting	Men's double trap	2 August
Gold	Philip Hindes; Chris Hoy; Jason Kenny	Cycling	Men's team sprint	2 August
Gold	Katherine Grainger; Anna Watkins	Rowing	Women's double sculls	3 August
Gold	Steven Burke; Ed Clancy; Peter Kennaugh; Geraint Thomas	Cycling	Men's team pursuit	3 August
Gold	Victoria Pendleton	Cycling	Women's keirin	3 August
Gold	Alex Gregory; Tom James; Pete Reed; Andrew Triggs-Hodge	Rowing	Men's coxless four	4 August
Gold	Katherine Copeland; Sophie Hosking	Rowing	Women's lightweight double sculls	4 August
Gold	Dani King; Joanna Rowsell; Laura Trott	Cycling	Women's team pursuit	4 August
Gold	Jessica Ennis	Athletics	Women's heptathlon	4 August
Gold	Greg Rutherford	Athletics	Men's long jump	4 August
Gold	Mo Farah	Athletics	Men's 10,000 m	4 August
Gold	Ben Ainslie	Sailing	Finn class	5 August
Gold	Andy Murray	Tennis	Men's singles	5 August
Gold	Scott Brash; Peter Charles; Ben Maher; Nick Skelton	Equestrian	Team jumping	6 August
Gold	Jason Kenny	Cycling	Men's sprint	6 August
Gold	Alistair Brownlee	Triathlon	Men's triathlon	7 August
Gold	Laura Bechtolsheimer; Charlotte Dujardin; Carl Hester	Equestrian	Team dressage	7 August
Gold	Laura Trott	Cycling	Women's omnium	7 August
Gold	Chris Hoy	Cycling	Men's keirin	7 August
Gold	Charlotte Dujardin	Equestrian	Individual dressage	9 August
Gold	Nicola Adams	Boxing	Women's flyweight	9 August
Gold	Jade Jones	Taekwondo	Women's 57 kg	9 August
Gold	Ed McKeever	Canoeing	Men's K-1 200 m	11 August
Gold	Mo Farah	Athletics	Men's 5,000 m	11 August
Gold	Luke Campbell	Boxing	Men's bantamweight	11 August
Gold	Anthony Joshua	Boxing	Men's super heavyweight	12 August
Silver	Lizzie Armitstead	Cycling	Women's road race	29 July
Silver	Mary King; Tina Cook; Zara Phillips; Nicola Wilson; William Fox-Pitt	Equestrian	Team eventing	31 July
Silver	Michael Jamieson	Swimming	Men's 200 m breaststroke	1 August
Silver	Chris Bartley; Peter Chambers; Richard Chambers; Rob Williams	Rowing	Men's lightweight coxless four	2 August
Silver	David Florence; Richard Hounslow	Canoeing	Men's slalom C-2	2 August
Silver	Gemma Gibbons	Judo	Women's 78 kg	2 August
Silver	Mark Hunter; Zac Purchase	Rowing	Men's lightweight double sculls	4 August
Silver	Iain Percy; Andrew Simpson	Sailing	Star class	5 August
Silver	Louis Smith	Gymnastics	Men's pommel horse	5 August
Silver	Andy Murray; Laura Robson	Tennis	Mixed doubles	5 August
Silver	Christine Ohuruogu	Athletics	Women's 400 m	5 August
Silver	Robbie Grabarz	Athletics	Men's high jump	7 August
Silver	Nick Dempsey	Sailing	Men's RS:X	7 August
Silver	Victoria Pendleton	Cycling	Women's sprint	7 August
Silver	Luke Patience; Stuart Bithell	Sailing	Men's 470 class	10 August
Silver	Hannah Mills; Saskia Clark	Sailing	Women's 470 class	10 August
Silver	Fred Evans	Boxing	Men's welterweight	12 August
Silver	Samantha Murray	Modern pentathlon	Women's modern pentathlon	12 August
Bronze	Rebecca Adlington	Swimming	Women's 400 m freestyle	29 July
Bronze	Sam Oldham; Daniel Purvis; Louis Smith; Kristian Thomas; Max Whitlock	Gymnastics	Men's artistic team all-around	30 July
Bronze	Alex Partridge; James Foad; Tom Ransley; Richard Egington; Moe Sbihi; Greg Searle; Matthew Langridge; Constantine Louloudis; Phelan Hill	Rowing	Men's eight	1 August
Bronze	Chris Froome	Cycling	Men's time trial	1 August
Bronze	George Nash; Will Satch	Rowing	Men's coxless pair	3 August
Bronze	Alan Campbell	Rowing	Men's single sculls	3 August
Bronze	Karina Bryant	Judo	Women's +78 kg	3 August
Bronze	Rebecca Adlington	Swimming	Women's 800 m freestyle	3 August
Bronze	Max Whitlock	Gymnastics	Men's pommel horse	5 August
Bronze	Ed Clancy	Cycling	Men's omnium	5 August
Bronze	Beth Tweddle	Gymnastics	Women's uneven bars	6 August
Bronze	Jonathan Brownlee	Triathlon	Men's triathlon	7 August
Bronze	Laura Bechtolsheimer	Equestrian	Individual dressage	9 August
Bronze	Anthony Ogogo	Boxing	Men's middleweight	10 August
Bronze	Great Britain women's national field hockey team: Beth Storry; Emily Maguire; Laura Unsworth; Crista Cullen; Anne Panter; Hannah Macleod; Helen Richardson-Walsh; Kate Richardson-Walsh; Chloe Rogers; Laura Bartlett; Alex Danson; Georgie Twigg; Ashleigh Ball; Sally Walton; Nicola White; Sarah Thomas	Field hockey	Women's tournament	10 August
Bronze	Lutalo Muhammad	Taekwondo	Men's 80 kg	10 August
Bronze	Liam Heath; Jon Schofield	Canoeing	Men's K-2 200 m	11 August
Bronze	Tom Daley	Diving	Men's 10 m platform	11 August

Medals by sport
**Sport**	1st place, gold medalist(s)	2nd place, silver medalist(s)	3rd place, bronze medalist(s)	Total
Cycling	8	2	2	12
Rowing	4	2	3	9
Athletics	4	2	0	6
Boxing	3	1	1	5
Equestrian	3	1	1	5
Canoeing	2	1	1	4
Sailing	1	4	0	5
Tennis	1	1	0	2
Taekwondo	1	0	1	2
Triathlon	1	0	1	2
Shooting	1	0	0	1
Gymnastics	0	1	3	4
Swimming	0	1	2	3
Judo	0	1	1	2
Modern pentathlon	0	1	0	1
Diving	0	0	1	1
Field hockey	0	0	1	1
Total	29	18	18	65

Medals by date
**Day**	**Date**	1st place, gold medalist(s)	2nd place, silver medalist(s)	3rd place, bronze medalist(s)	Total
1	28 July	0	0	0	0
2	29 July	0	1	1	2
3	30 July	0	0	1	1
4	31 July	0	1	0	1
5	1 Aug	2	1	2	5
6	2 Aug	3	3	0	6
7	3 Aug	3	0	4	7
8	4 Aug	6	1	0	7
9	5 Aug	2	4	2	8
10	6 Aug	2	0	1	3
11	7 Aug	4	3	1	8
12	8 Aug	0	0	0	0
13	9 Aug	3	0	1	4
14	10 Aug	0	2	3	5
15	11 Aug	3	0	2	5
16	12 Aug	1	2	0	3
Total		29	18	18	65

=== Multiple medallists ===
The following Team GB competitors won several medals at the 2012 Olympic Games.

Name	Medal	Sport	Event
Chris Hoy	Gold	Cycling	Men's team sprint
Chris Hoy	Gold	Cycling	Men's keirin
Laura Trott	Gold	Cycling	Women's team pursuit
Laura Trott	Gold	Cycling	Women's omnium
Jason Kenny	Gold	Cycling	Men's team sprint
Jason Kenny	Gold	Cycling	Men's sprint
Charlotte Dujardin	Gold	Equestrian	Team dressage
Charlotte Dujardin	Gold	Equestrian	Individual dressage
Mo Farah	Gold	Athletics	Men's 10,000 m
Mo Farah	Gold	Athletics	Men's 5,000 m
Andy Murray	Gold	Tennis	Men's singles
Andy Murray	Silver	Tennis	Mixed doubles
Victoria Pendleton	Gold	Cycling	Women's keirin
Victoria Pendleton	Silver	Cycling	Women's sprint
Ed Clancy	Gold	Cycling	Men's team pursuit
Ed Clancy	Bronze	Cycling	Men's omnium
Laura Bechtolsheimer	Gold	Equestrian	Team dressage
Laura Bechtolsheimer	Bronze	Equestrian	Individual dressage
Louis Smith	Silver	Gymnastics	Men's pommel horse
Louis Smith	Bronze	Gymnastics	Men's team all-around
Max Whitlock	Bronze	Gymnastics	Men's pommel horse
Max Whitlock	Bronze	Gymnastics	Men's team all-around
Rebecca Adlington	Bronze	Swimming	Women's 400 m freestyle
Rebecca Adlington	Bronze	Swimming	Women's 800 m freestyle

=== "Super Saturday" ===
Day 8 (4 August) of the Games, which had been billed in the build up to the Games in the host country as "Super Saturday" due to the expected programme creating numerous strong medal possibilities for the hosts, saw Great Britain record their most successful day at the Olympics since the 1908 games. The day saw the team win 6 gold medals, starting in the rowing for Alex Gregory, Tom James, Pete Reed and Andrew Triggs Hodge in the men's coxless four and Katherine Copeland and Sophie Hosking in the women's lightweight double sculls, followed in the cycling by Dani King, Joanna Rowsell Shand and Laura Trott in the women's team pursuit. This was followed by three athletics gold medals in the space of 46 minutes, with Jessica Ennis winning gold in the women's heptathlon, Greg Rutherford in the men's long jump and Mo Farah in the men's 10,000 metres. Completing the medal total on the day in the rowing was a silver for Mark Hunter and Zac Purchase in the men's lightweight double sculls. Lord Coe, organiser of London 2012, described the unfolding of the day's events as "a narrative of infectious success" and the greatest day of sport he had ever witnessed.

== Medal and performance targets ==
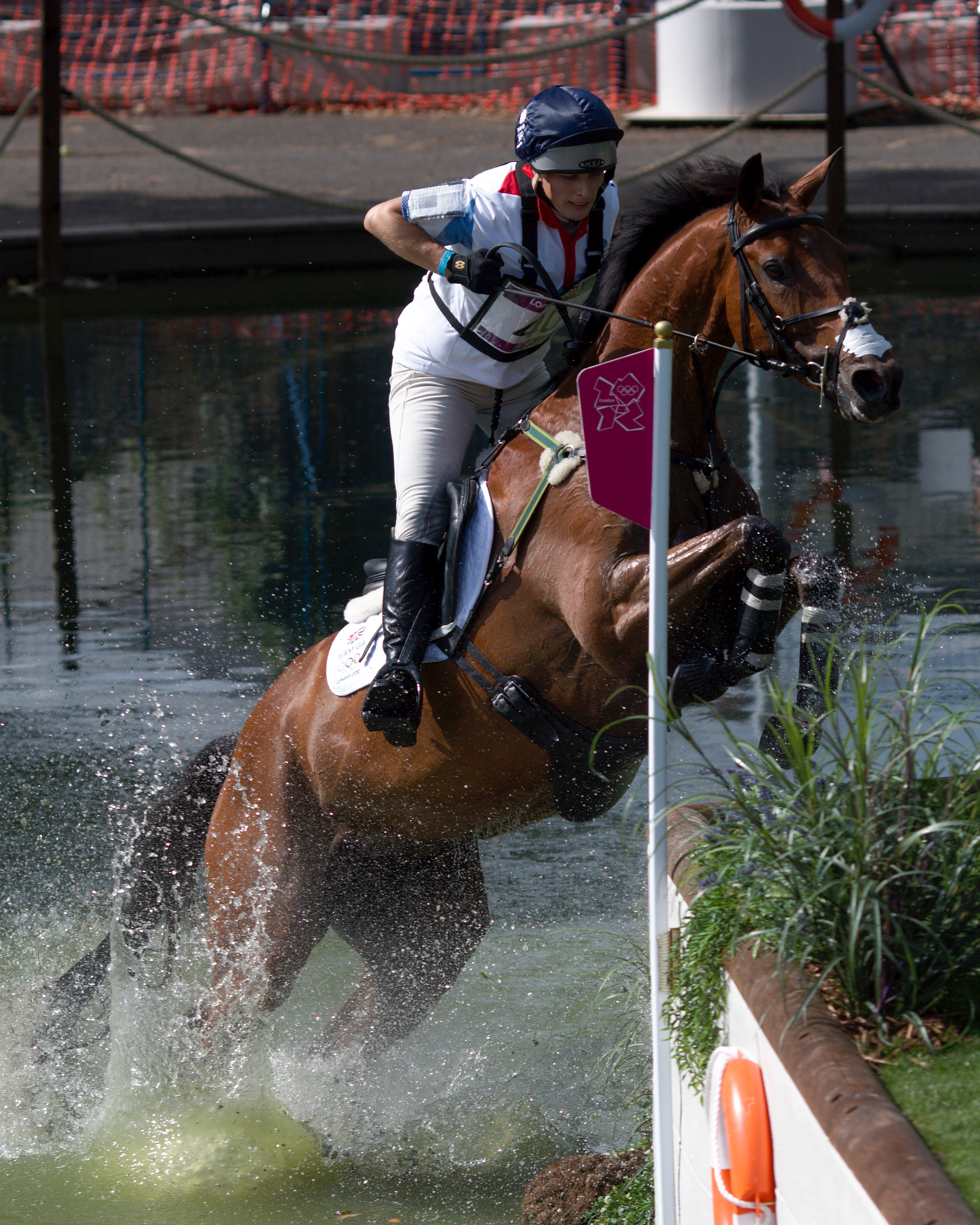
Silver medal winner Zara Phillips riding High Kingdom during the cross-country discipline of the equestrian eventing

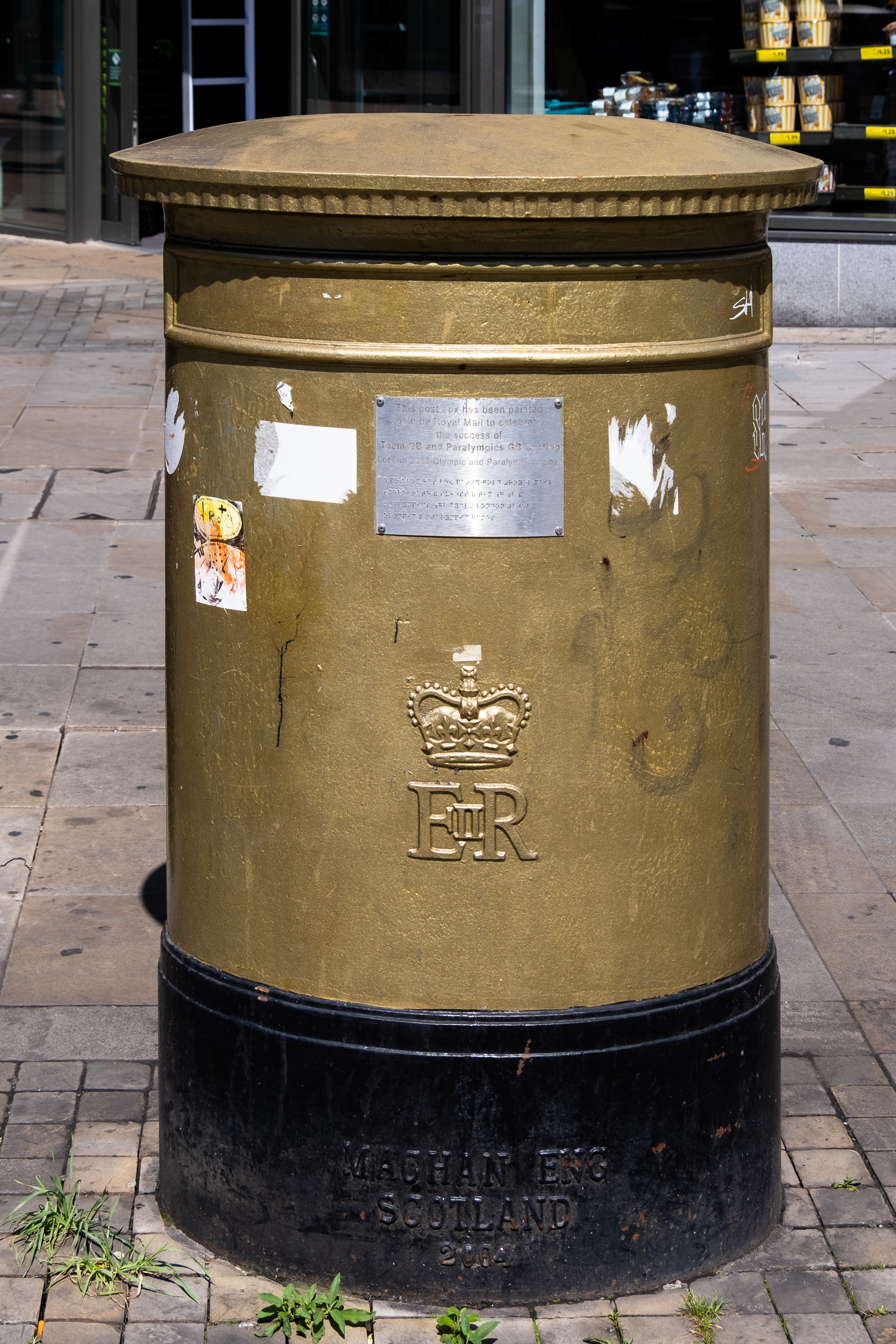
A post box in each of the gold medallists' home towns was painted gold by Royal Mail to celebrate their success

With Team GB attempting to build on their previous successes in Beijing four years earlier, expectations prior to the London Olympics were very high with the additional advantage of competing with home support. UK Sport, the body responsible for distributing £300 million in Olympic and Paralympic sports, revealed on 4 July 2012 a target of finishing in the top four of the medal table and winning at least 48 medals across at least 12 sports based on an aggregate medal range of 40–70. although a specific number of gold medals was not targeted.

Team GB was also highly rated by other expert and professional sport bodies prior to the Olympics. This included a team of experts invited by BBC Radio 5 live, which implied an estimated total of 95 medals: 27 gold, 25 silver and 43 bronze. Sports statistics provider Infostrada projected 57 medals, 16 of them gold. Sheffield Hallam University 56 medals, 27 of them gold; whilst Luciana Barra a former Italian Olympic Committee member, estimated 59 medals, 16 of them gold.

UK Sport set targets for medals and positions for each individual Olympic sports except Football. These are listed in the table below, along with the actual Team GB performance.

The only sport which Team GB failed to meet its medal target was in Swimming.

Sport	Target		Resultant medals or placings	Target realisation
Sport	No. medals	Non-medal placing	Resultant medals or placings	Target realisation
Archery	0–1	2 × 4th	3 in last 16	✗ Missed
Athletics	5–8		6	✓ Realised
Badminton	0–1	1 × 4th	Won 2 of 7 group stage	✗ Missed
Basketball	0–1	2 × 5th	Won 1 of 12 group stage	✗ Missed
Boxing	3–5		5	✓ Realised
Canoeing	3–4		4	✓ Realised
Cycling	6–10		12	✓ ✓ Exceeded
Diving	1–3		1	✓ Realised
Equestrian	3–4		5	✓ ✓ Exceeded
Fencing	0–1	1 × 6th	6th & 8th	✓ Realised
Field hockey	1–2		1	✓ Realised
Gymnastics	1–2		4	✓ ✓ Exceeded
Handball	0–1	1 × 5th	Won 0 of 10 group stage	✗ Missed
Judo	0–1	4 × 4th	2	✓ ✓ Exceeded
Modern pentathlon	1–2		1	✓ Realised
Rowing	6		9	✓ ✓ Exceeded
Sailing	3–5		5	✓ Realised
Shooting	0–1	1 × 4th	1	✓ Realised
Swimming	5–7		3	✗ Missed
Synchronised swimming	0–1		0	✓ Realised
Table tennis	0–1	1 × 32nd	1 × 16th	✓ Realised
Taekwondo	1–3		2	✓ Realised
Tennis	0–2		2	✓ Realised
Triathlon	1–2		2	✓ Realised
Volleyball	0–1	1 team to win 1 match	Won 1 of 10 group stage	✓ Realised
Water polo	0–1	4th	Won 0 of 8 group stage	✗ Missed
Weightlifting	0–1	1 × 4th	10	✗ Missed
Wrestling	0–1	1 × 4th	Won 0 of 1 1st round	✗ Missed
Total	48–70		65	✓ Realised

=== UK Sport funding ===
In the Olympic cycle from 2008 until 2012 the government agency UK Sport allocated a total budget of more than £264 million towards funding Team GB and the individual athletes and teams specifically for the 2012 Olympic Games in London. The sports which received the highest funding were rowing, cycling, athletics, sailing, and swimming. The only sports on the Olympic Programme that were not given any funding by the body were football and beach volleyball.

Sport	Funding
Archery	£4,408,000
Athletics	£25,148,000
Badminton	£7,434,900
Basketball	£8,599,000
Boxing	£9,551,000
Canoeing	£16,176,000
Cycling	£26,032,000
Diving	£6,535,000
Equestrian	£13,395,100
Fencing	£2,535,335
Field hockey	£15,013,200
Gymnastics	£10,770,600
Handball	£2,924,721
Judo	£7,498,000
Modern pentathlon	£6,288,800
Rowing	£27,287,600
Sailing	£22,942,700
Shooting	£2,461,866
Swimming	£25,144,600
Synchronised swimming	£3,398,300
Table tennis	£1,213,848
Taekwondo	£4,833,600
Triathlon	£5,291,300
Volleyball	£3,536,077
Weightlifting	£1,365,157
Wrestling	£1,435,210
Total	£264,143,753

== Delegation ==
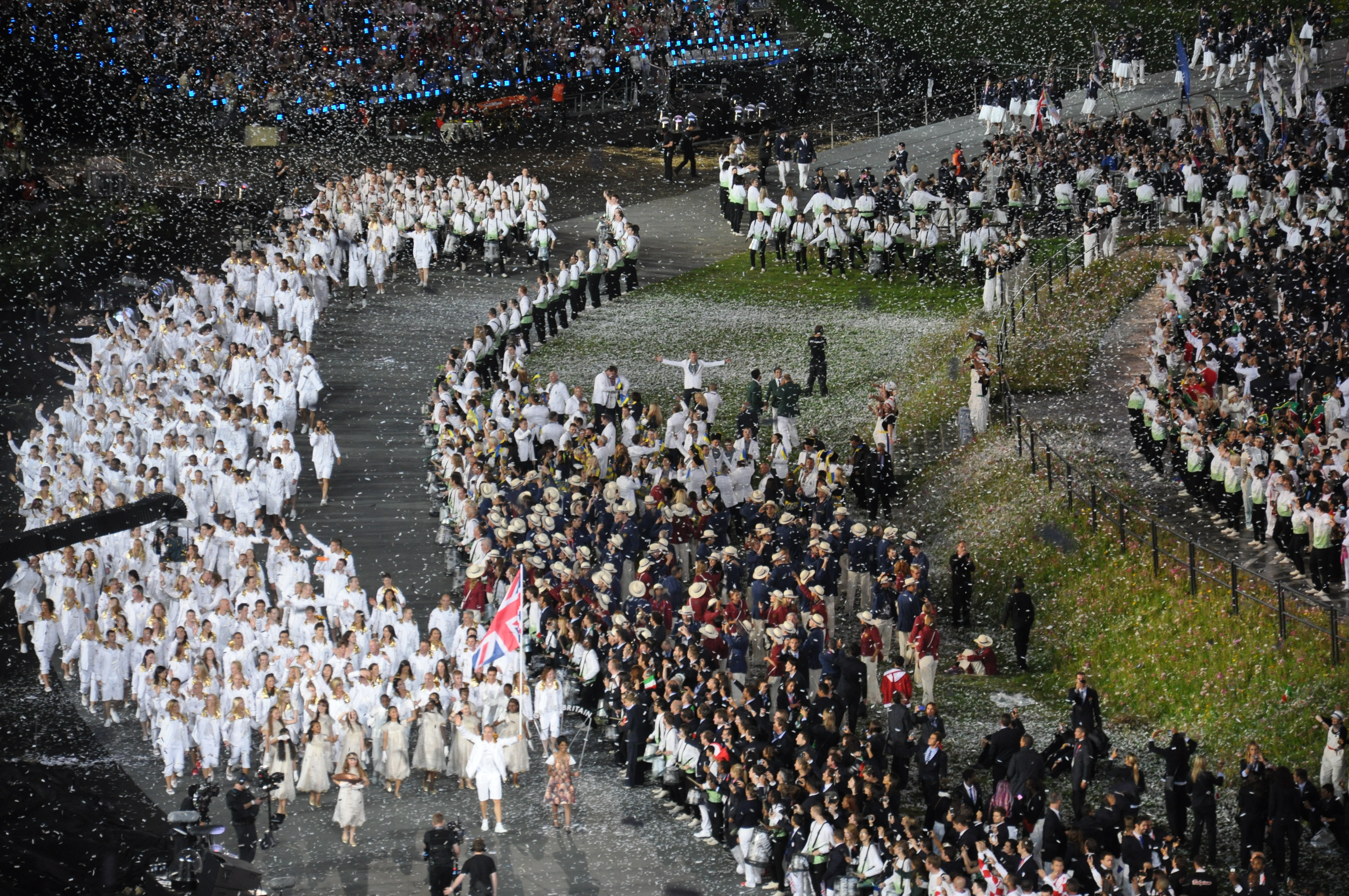
The athletes entering the Olympic Stadium, led by flagbearer Chris Hoy, during the opening ceremony

The team, known by the International Olympic Committee (IOC) as Great Britain, selects athletes from all four of the Home Nations (England, Northern Ireland, Scotland and Wales), as well as the three Crown Dependencies (Isle of Man, Jersey and Guernsey), and all but three of the British overseas territories (Cayman Islands, British Virgin Islands and Bermuda having their own NOCs). The team is organised by the British Olympic Association (BOA) who have since 1999 branded it Team GB, explaining that "Team GB is the Great Britain and Northern Ireland Olympic Team."

The BOA selected a team of 541 athletes, 279 men and 262 women, to compete in all sports after gaining automatic qualification places in their respective events.

The BOA by-law preventing the selection of athletes sanctioned for anti-doping rule violations was struck down by the Court of Arbitration for Sport in April 2012, allowing the participation of Dwain Chambers, David Millar and Carl Myerscough.

British Olympic Association chief Colin Moynihan, 4th Baron Moynihan condemned the disproportionate number of British Olympic competitors who had attended expensive, elite private schools. Twenty per cent of all British Olympic competitors and 33% of the British participants in the rowing, sailing, and equestrian events, in which the host country won a number of medals, attended private schools. Moynihan called the numbers, "one of the worst statistics in British sport" and said that it was "wrong and unacceptable" that so many elite British athletes came from privileged backgrounds. Alan Bairner, professor of sport and social theory at Loughborough University, said that a primary factor in the numbers was the existence of excellent sports facilities and specialized coaching at the private schools and lack of the same at many state-sponsored schools.

The Great Britain kit was designed by Stella McCartney. In addition to the Olympic merchandise, a range of Team GB branded items went on sale including the BOA's official mascot Pride.

=== Competitors ===
The following is the list of number of competitors participating in the Games. Note that reserves for fencing, field hockey, football and handball are not counted as athletes:

Sport	Men	Women	Total
Archery	3	3	6
Athletics	44	33	77
Badminton	2	2	4
Basketball	12	12	24
Boxing	7	3	10
Canoeing	9	6	15
Cycling	15	12	27
Diving	5	7	12
Equestrian	7	6	13
Fencing	4	6	10
Field hockey	16	16	32
Football	18	18	36
Gymnastics	5	13	18
Handball	14	14	28
Judo	7	7	14
Modern pentathlon	2	2	4
Rowing	28	19	47
Sailing	9	7	16
Shooting	7	4	11
Swimming	23	21	44
Synchronised swimming	0	9	9
Table tennis	3	3	6
Taekwondo	2	2	4
Tennis	4	4	8
Triathlon	3	3	6
Volleyball	14	14	28
Water polo	13	13	26
Weightlifting	3	2	5
Wrestling	0	1	1
Total	279	262	541

== Archery ==
As the host nation, Britain automatically received the full allocation of six individual places, alongside entry to both the men's and women's team events. Former medalist Alison Williamson competed in her sixth consecutive Summer Olympics, becoming only the third British athlete to do so, but failed to move past the first round. Both the women's and men's teams failed to progress further than the round of 16 after losing to the Russian and Ukrainian teams respectively, while no individual archers made it past the round of 16.

=== Men ===
Athlete	Event	Ranking round		Round of 64	Round of 32	Round of 16	Quarterfinals	Semifinals	Final / BM	
Athlete	Event	Score	Seed	Opposition Score	Opposition Score	Opposition Score	Opposition Score	Opposition Score	Opposition Score	Rank
Laurence Godfrey	Individual	680	4	Milon (BAN) (61); W 6–0	Serrano (MEX) (29); W 7–1	Mohamad (MAS) (20); L 5–6	Did not advance			
Simon Terry	Individual	654	50	Ishizu (JPN) (15); W 7–1	Olaru (MDA) (47); L 1–7	Did not advance				
Alan Wills	Individual	660	42	Worth (AUS) (23); L 5–6	Did not advance					
Laurence Godfrey; Simon Terry; Alan Wills	Team	1994	8	Not scheduled		Ukraine (9); L 212–223	Did not advance			

=== Women ===
Athlete	Event	Ranking round		Round of 64	Round of 32	Round of 16	Quarterfinals	Semifinals	Final / BM	
Athlete	Event	Score	Seed	Opposition Score	Opposition Score	Opposition Score	Opposition Score	Opposition Score	Opposition Score	Rank
Naomi Folkard	Individual	637	42	Timofeeva (RUS) (23); W 6–4	Avitia (MEX) (10); L 2–6	Did not advance				
Amy Oliver	Individual	608	57	Kumari (IND) (8); W 6–2	Rochmawati (INA) (40); L 1–7	Did not advance				
Alison Williamson	Individual	629	47	Bishindee (MGL) (18); L 3–7	Did not advance					
Naomi Folkard; Amy Oliver; Alison Williamson	Team	1874	11	Not scheduled		Russia (6); L 208–215	Did not advance			

== Athletics ==
In Athletics, the British team did not receive any automatic places for representing the host nation, as they had done in other sports. A squad of 77 athletes was initially selected for the Games. The selection of Lynsey Sharp as the team's sole representative in the 800 m when there were three places available proved controversial. Sharp, who won the event at the GB Olympic trials, failed to achieve the 'A' qualifying standard. Under international rules, non 'A' standard competitors could only be selected if no other athletes that have met the standard were chosen. As a result, Sharp's inclusion meant the exclusion of four other runners that had achieved the 'A' standard, including 2011 European Athletics Indoor Championships gold medallist Jenny Meadows.

Gareth Warburton was initially not selected for the 800 metres, having failed to achieve the 'A' qualifying standard at the 2012 European Athletics Championships in Helsinki, but was granted a place at the Games following an appeal. Ten other British athletes were unsuccessful with their appeals to be included. David Webb was initially chosen as part of the squad for the men's marathon but withdrew on 25 July due to injury. No replacement was selected. Paula Radcliffe was initially chosen as part of the squad for the women's marathon but withdrew on 29 July due to injury; Freya Murray was called up as her replacement. Welshman Dai Greene was selected to captain the athletics squad, reprising a role he had first served at the 2011 European Team Championships in Sweden.

In the Games, Great Britain had their best track and field performance since the Moscow Games in 1980, with 4 gold medals including a double gold for Mo Farah over the 5,000 and 10,000 metres. Pre-event favourites Farah in the 10,000 metres, Jessica Ennis in heptathlon, and the world leading, but slightly less favoured Greg Rutherford in the long jump, won 3 gold medals for Great Britain in the space of 49 minutes on the middle Saturday of the Games.

- Ranks given for track events are within the athlete's heat only

Q
Qualified for the next round
q
Qualified for the next round as a fastest loser or, in field events, by position without achieving the qualifying target
NR
National record
WB
World Best
N/A
Round not applicable for the event
Bye
Athlete not required to compete in round

=== Men ===
==== Track & road events ====
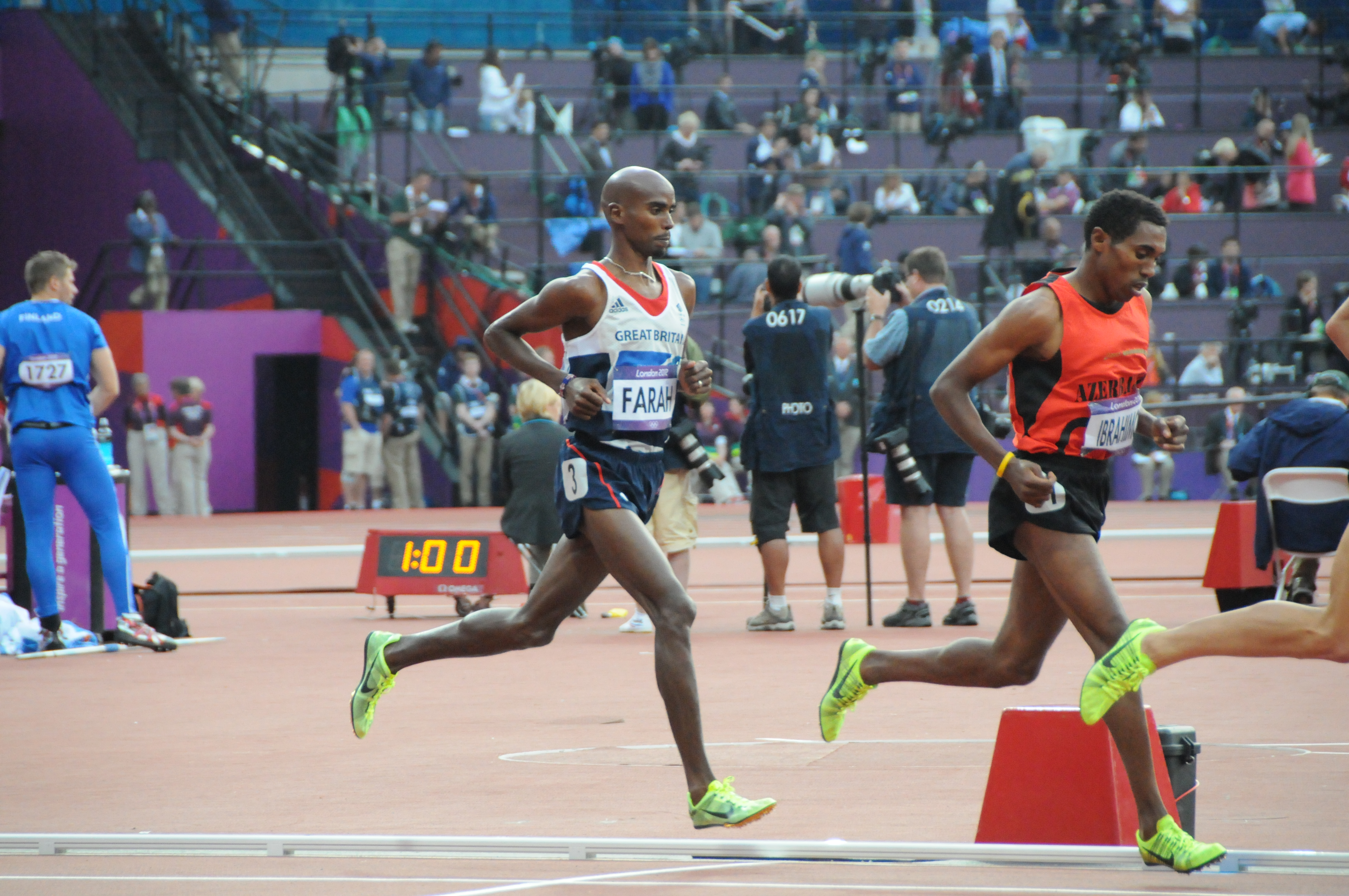
Double gold medallist Mo Farah competing in the 5000 m.

Athlete	Event	Heat		Quarterfinal		Semifinal		Final	
Athlete	Event	Result	Rank	Result	Rank	Result	Rank	Result	Rank
Dwain Chambers	100 m	Bye		10.02	1 Q	10.05	4	Did not advance	
James Dasaolu	100 m	Bye		10.13	3 Q	10.18	7	Did not advance	
Adam Gemili	100 m	Bye		10.11	2 Q	10.06	3	Did not advance	
James Ellington	200 m	21.23	6	Not held		Did not advance			
Christian Malcolm	200 m	20.59	2 Q	Not held		20.51	3	Did not advance	
Nigel Levine	400 m	45.58	3 Q	Not held		45.64	6	Did not advance	
Martyn Rooney	400 m	45.36	2 Q	Not held		45.31	5	Did not advance	
Conrad Williams	400 m	46.12	3 Q	Not held		45.53	8	Did not advance	
Andrew Osagie	800 m	1:46.42	3 Q	Not held		1:44.74	2 Q	1:43.77	8
Michael Rimmer	800 m	1:49.05	5	Not held		Did not advance			
Gareth Warburton	800 m	1:46.97	5	Not held		Did not advance			
Andy Baddeley	1500 m	3:40.34	6 Q	Not held		3:36.03	8	Did not advance	
Ross Murray	1500 m	3:36.74	4 Q	Not held		3:44.92	10	Did not advance	
Mo Farah	5000 m	13:26.00	3 Q	Not held				13:41.66	1st place, gold medalist(s)
Nick McCormick	5000 m	13:25.70	12	Not held				Did not advance	
Mo Farah	10000 m	Not held						27:30.42	1st place, gold medalist(s)
Chris Thompson	10000 m	Not held						29:06.14	25
Lawrence Clarke	110 m hurdles	13.42	2 Q	Not held		13.31	3 q	13.39	4
Andrew Pozzi	110 m hurdles	DNF		Not held		Did not advance			
Andrew Turner	110 m hurdles	13.42	1 Q	Not held		13.42	4	Did not advance	
Jack Green	400 m hurdles	49.49	2 Q	Not held		DNF		Did not advance	
Dai Greene	400 m hurdles	48.98	1 Q	Not held		48.19	4 q	48.24	4
Rhys Williams	400 m hurdles	49.17	5 q	Not held		49.63	4	Did not advance	
Stuart Stokes	3000 m steeplechase	8:43.04	12	Not held				Did not advance	
Dwain Chambers; Adam Gemili; Christian Malcolm; Danny Talbot	4 × 100 m relay	DSQ		Not held				Did not advance	
Jack Green; Dai Greene; Nigel Levine*; Martyn Rooney; Conrad Williams	4 × 400 m relay	3:00.38	2 Q	Not held				2:59:53	4
Lee Merrien	Marathon	Not held						2:17:00	30
Scott Overall	Marathon	Not held						2:22:37	61
Dominic King	50 km walk	Not held						4:15:05	51

* Competed in relay heats only

==== Field event ====
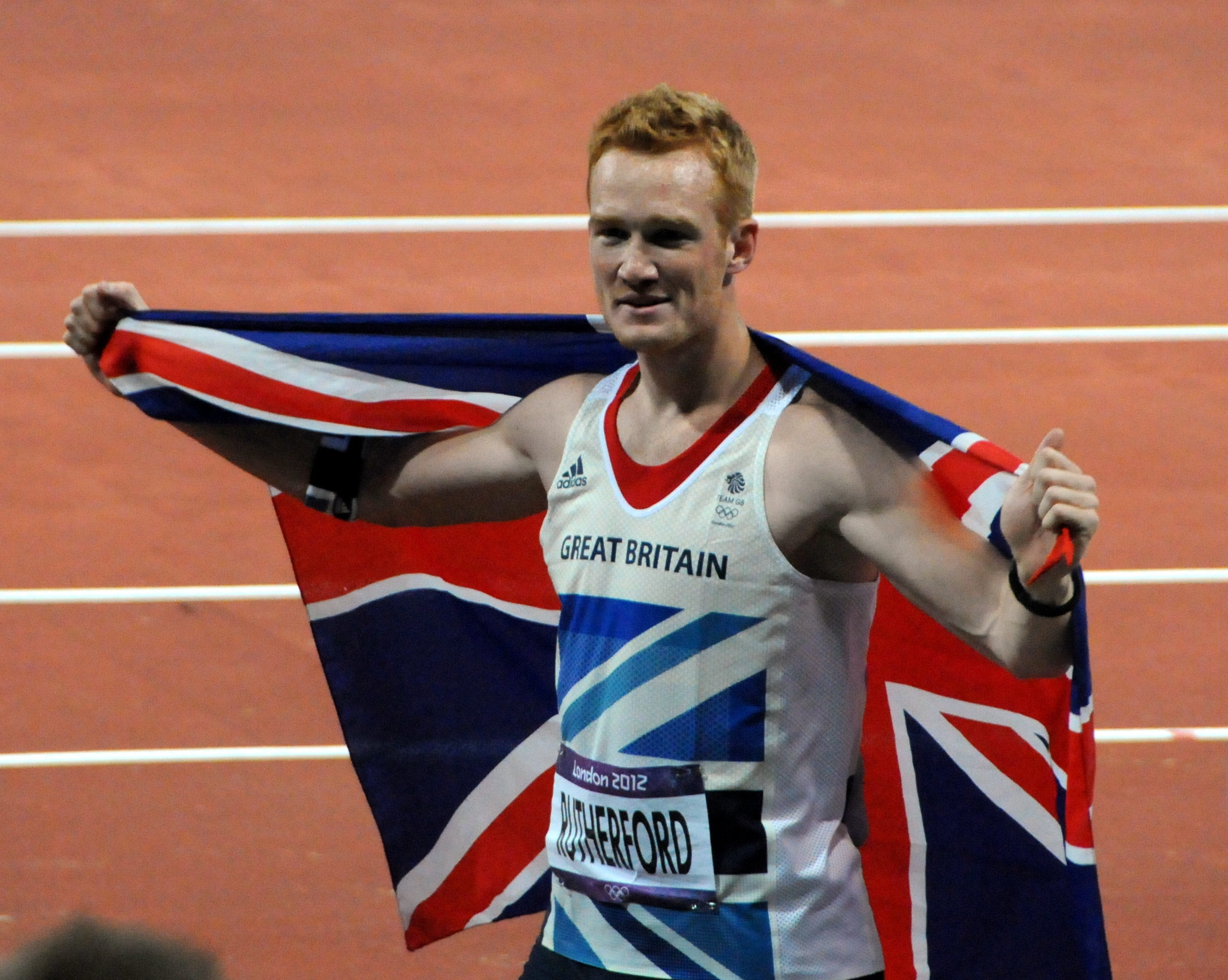
Greg Rutherford, gold medallist in the long jump.

Athlete	Event	Qualification		Final	
Athlete	Event	Distance	Position	Distance	Rank
Greg Rutherford	Long jump	8.08	4 q	8.31	1st place, gold medalist(s)
Chris Tomlinson	Long jump	8.06	5 q	8.07	6
Philips Idowu	Triple jump	16.53	14	Did not advance	
Robbie Grabarz	High jump	2.29	1 q	2.29	2nd place, silver medalist(s)
Steven Lewis	Pole vault	5.50	=9 q	5.75	=4
Carl Myerscough	Shot put	18.95	29	Did not advance	
Abdul Buhari	Discus throw	60.08	29	Did not advance	
Brett Morse	Discus throw	58.18	35	Did not advance	
Lawrence Okoye	Discus throw	65.28	4 Q	61.03	12
Mervyn Luckwell	Javelin throw	74.09	35	Did not advance	
Alex Smith	Hammer throw	74.71	11 q	72.87	12

Combined events – Decathlon

Athlete	Event	100 m	LJ	SP	HJ	400 m	110H	DT	PV	JT	1500 m	Final	Rank
Daniel Awde	Result	10.71	6.83	DNS	—	—	—	—	—	—	—	DNF	
Daniel Awde	Points	926	774	0	—	—	—	—	—	—	—	DNF	

=== Women ===
==== Track & road events ====
Athlete	Event	Heat		Quarterfinal		Semifinal		Final	
Athlete	Event	Result	Rank	Result	Rank	Result	Rank	Result	Rank
Anyika Onuora	100 m	Bye		11.41	5	Did not advance			
Abi Oyepitan	100 m	Bye		11.22	5 q	11.36	8	Did not advance	
Margaret Adeoye	200 m	22.94	3 Q	Not held		23.28	7	Did not advance	
Anyika Onuora	200 m	23.23	4	Not held		Did not advance			
Abi Oyepitan	200 m	22.92	2 Q	Not held		23.14	6	Did not advance	
Shana Cox	400 m	52.01	3 Q	Not held		52.58	7	Did not advance	
Lee McConnell	400 m	52.23	3 Q	Not held		52.24	7	Did not advance	
Christine Ohuruogu	400 m	50.80	2 Q	Not held		50.22	2 Q	49.70	2nd place, silver medalist(s)
Lynsey Sharp	800 m	2:01.41	2 Q	Not held		2:01.78	7	did not advance	
Lisa Dobriskey	1500 m	4:13.32	1 Q	Not held		4:05.35	4 Q	4:15.02	5**
Hannah England	1500 m	4:05.73	5 Q	Not held		4:06.35	9	Did not advance	
Laura Weightman	1500 m	4:07.29	6 Q	Not held		4:02.99	7 q	4:16.60	6**
Julia Bleasdale	5000 m	15:02.00	4 Q	Not held				15:14.55	8
Barbara Parker	5000 m	15:12.81	9	Not held				Did not advance	
Jo Pavey	5000 m	15:02.84	7 q	Not held				15:12.72	7
Julia Bleasdale	10000 m	Not held						30:55.63	8
Jo Pavey	10000 m	Not held						30:53.20	7
Jessica Ennis	100 m hurdles	DNS		Not held		Did not advance			
Tiffany Porter	100 m hurdles	12.79	3 Q	Not held		12.79	4	Did not advance	
Eilidh Child	400 m hurdles	56.14	3 Q	Not held		56.03	7	Did not advance	
Perri Shakes-Drayton	400 m hurdles	54.62	1 Q	Not held		55.19	3	Did not advance	
Eilish McColgan	3000 m steeplechase	9:54.36	9	Not held				Did not advance	
Barbara Parker	3000 m steeplechase	9:32.07	6	Not held				Did not advance	
Eilidh Child*; Shana Cox; Lee McConnell; Christine Ohuruogu; Perri Shakes-Drayton	4 × 400 m relay	3:25.05	3 Q	Not held				3:24.76	4***
Claire Hallissey	Marathon	Not held						2:35:39	57
Freya Murray	Marathon	Not held						2:32:14	44
Mara Yamauchi	Marathon	Not held						DNF	
Johanna Jackson	20 km walk	Not held						DSQ	

* Competed in relay heats only

** Moved up 5 positions due to athletes that finished ahead of them being disqualified for Doping.

***Upgraded to 4th due to silver medalists Russia being disqualified for Doping.

==== Field events ====
Athlete	Event	Qualification		Final	
Athlete	Event	Distance	Position	Distance	Position
Shara Proctor	Long jump	6.83	1 Q	6.55	9
Yamile Aldama	Triple jump	14.45	3 Q	14.48	5
Holly Bleasdale	Pole vault	4.55	=7 q	4.45	=6
Kate Dennison	Pole vault	4.25	=26	Did not advance	
Sophie Hitchon	Hammer throw	71.98 NR	10 q	69.33	12
Goldie Sayers	Javelin throw	NM	—	Did not advance	

==== Combined events – Heptathlon ====
Athlete	Event	100H	HJ	SP	200 m	LJ	JT	800 m	Final	Rank
Jessica Ennis	Result	12.54 WB	1.86	14.28	22.83	6.48	47.49	2:08.65	6955 NR	1st place, gold medalist(s)
Jessica Ennis	Points	1195	1054	813	1096	1001	812	984	6955 NR	1st place, gold medalist(s)
Louise Hazel	Result	13.48	1.59	12.81	24.48	5.77	47.38	2:18.78	5856	25*
Louise Hazel	Points	1053	724	715	935	780	809	840	5856	25*
Katarina Johnson-Thompson	Result	13.48	1.89	11.32	23.73	6.19	38.37	2:10.76	6267	13*
Katarina Johnson-Thompson	Points	1053	1093	616	1007	908	636	954	6267	13*

*Moved up 2 positions due to athletes that finished ahead of them being disqualified for Doping.

== Badminton ==
As hosts, Team GB were entitled to enter two badminton players regardless of how they fared in qualifying. At the qualification date, Team GB had qualified four places; a single player in each singles event, and a pair in the mixed doubles.

Athlete	Event	Group stage				Elimination	Quarterfinal	Semifinal	Final / BM	
Athlete	Event	Opposition Score	Opposition Score	Opposition Score	Rank	Opposition Score	Opposition Score	Opposition Score	Opposition Score	Rank
Rajiv Ouseph	Men's singles	Hurskainen (SWE); W 22–20 17–21 21–15	Cordón (GUA); L 21–12 17–21 19–21	None	2	Did not advance				
Susan Egelstaff	Women's singles	Tvrdy (SLO); W 21–15 21–10	Sato (JPN); L 21–18 16–21 12–21	None	2	Did not advance				
Chris Adcock; Imogen Bankier	Mixed doubles	Nikolaenko / Sorokina (RUS); L 21–14 9–21 18–21	Fuchs / Michels (GER); L 21–11 14–21 17–21	Zhang N / Zhao Yl (CHN); L 13–21 14–21	4	—N/a	Did not advance			

== Basketball ==
Basketball was the only sport in which Great Britain were not guaranteed entry as hosts in 2012. In early 2011, FIBA granted the men's and women's teams automatic qualification. Until 2006, England, Scotland, Wales and Northern Ireland competed as separate teams.

=== Men's tournament ===
==== Roster ====
The following is the Great Britain roster in the men's basketball tournament of the 2012 Summer Olympics.

Great Britain men's national basketball team – 2012 Summer Olympics roster
Players
Coaches

Pos.	No.	Name	Age – Date of birth	Height	Club
PF	4	Kieron Achara	29 – 3 July 1983	2.08 m (6 ft 10 in)	Assignia Manresa
PG	5	Andrew Lawrence	22 – 4 June 1990	1.85 m (6 ft 1 in)	Charleston Cougars
SG	6	Mike Lenzly	31 – 1 May 1981	1.89 m (6 ft 2 in)	ČEZ Nymburk
F/C	7	Pops Mensah-Bonsu	28 – 7 September 1983	2.06 m (6 ft 9 in)	Beşiktaş Milangaz
SF	8	Andrew Sullivan	31 – 12 February 1980	2.03 m (6 ft 8 in)	Leicester Riders
SF	9	Luol Deng	27 – 16 April 1985	2.06 m (6 ft 9 in)	Chicago Bulls
C	10	Robert Archibald	32 – 29 March 1980	2.11 m (6 ft 11 in)	CAI Zaragoza
PF	11	Joel Freeland	25 – 7 February 1987	2.08 m (6 ft 10 in)	Portland Trail Blazers
PG	12	Nate Reinking	38 – 12 December 1973	1.88 m (6 ft 2 in)	Sheffield Sharks
PF	13	Daniel Clark	23 – 16 September 1988	2.10 m (6 ft 11 in)	CB Estudiantes
SG	14	Kyle Johnson	23 – 31 December 1988	1.95 m (6 ft 5 in)	APOEL B.C.
C	15	Eric Boateng	26 – 20 November 1985	2.08 m (6 ft 10 in)	Peristeri B.C.

Head coach

- Chris Finch

Assistant coach(es)

- Paul Mokeski
- Nick Nurse

Legend
- Club is latest as prior to tournament.
- Age is as at 29 July 2012.

==== Group play ====
Pos	Team	Pld	W	L	PF	PA	PD	Pts	Qualification
1	Russia	5	4	1	400	359	+41	9 (Note: Head-to-head record: Russia 1–0 Brazil)	Quarterfinals
2	Brazil	5	4	1	402	349	+53	9	Quarterfinals
3	Spain	5	3	2	414	394	+20	8 (Note: Head-to-head record: Spain 1–0 Australia)	Quarterfinals
4	Australia	5	3	2	410	373	+37	8	Quarterfinals
5	Great Britain (H)	5	1	4	380	405	−25	6	
6	China	5	0	5	313	439	−126	5	

Source: FIBA archive
Rules for classification: 1) points; 2) head-to-head points; 3) head-to-head goal average; 4) head-to-head number of points scored.
(H) Hosts
Notes:

29 July 2012
20:00

Report

Russia	95–75	Great Britain
Scoring by quarter: 24–19, 25–15, 22–24, 24–17
Pts: Kirilenko 35; Rebs: Shved 6 Asts: Shved 13		Pts: Deng 26; Rebs: Freeland 10; Asts: Deng, Reinking 3

Basketball Arena, London
Referees: Pablo Estévez (ARG), Jorge Vázquez (PUR), Stephen Seibel (CAN)

31 July 2012
16:45

Report

Great Britain	62–67	Brazil
Scoring by quarter: 11–4, 16–23, 16–21, 19–19
Pts: Mensah-Bonsu, Reinking 13; Rebs: Mensah-Bonsu 12; Asts: Deng 7		Pts: Splitter 21; Rebs: three players 6 Asts: Huertas 8

Basketball Arena, London
Referees: Recep Ankaralı (TUR), Ilija Belošević (SRB), Fernando Sampietro (ARG)

2 August 2012
20:00

Report

Spain	79–78	Great Britain
Scoring by quarter: 24–15, 13–14, 24–19, 18–30
Pts: Calderón 19; Rebs: San Emeterio 10; Asts: Fernández 7		Pts: Deng 26; Rebs: Deng 9 Asts: Deng 7

Basketball Arena, London
Referees: Bill Kennedy (USA), Saša Pukl (SLO), Oļegs Latiševs (LAT)

4 August 2012
20:00

Report

Great Britain	75–106	Australia
Scoring by quarter: 25–18, 21–18, 14–30, 15–40
Pts: Freeland 16; Rebs: Freeland 7 Asts: Archibald 4		Pts: Mills 39; Rebs: Newley 8 Asts: Ingles, Newley 4

Basketball Arena, London
Referees: Juan Arteaga (ESP), José Carrion (PUR), Robert Lottermoser (GER)

6 August 2012
16:45

Report

Great Britain	90–58	China
Scoring by quarter: 27–15, 19–16, 26–17, 18–10
Pts: Achara 16; Rebs: Archibald 9 Asts: Lawrence 6		Pts: Wang Zhizhi 11; Rebs: Yi Jianlian 14; Asts: Liu Wei 4

Basketball Arena, London
Referees: Cristiano Maranho (BRA), Fernando Sampietro (ARG), Vaughan Mayberry (AUS)

=== Women's tournament ===
==== Roster ====
The following is the Great Britain roster in the women's basketball tournament of the 2012 Summer Olympics.

Great Britain women's national basketball team – 2012 Summer Olympics roster
Players
Coaches

Pos.	No.	Name	Age – Date of birth	Height	Club	Ctr.
G	4	Natalie Stafford	35 – 8 December 1976	1.76 m (5 ft 9 in)	Sydney Uni Flames	(Australia)
G	5	Rose Anderson	24 – 23 March 1988	1.78 m (5 ft 10 in)	UWIC Archers	(United Kingdom)
G	6	Stef Collins	29 – 30 December 1982	1.68 m (5 ft 6 in)	UWIC Archers	(United Kingdom)
PG	7	Rachael Vanderwal	29 – 27 June 1983	1.75 m (5 ft 9 in)	University of Limerick	(Republic of Ireland)
F	8	Chantelle Handy	25 – 16 June 1987	1.88 m (6 ft 2 in)	Sony Athinaikos Athens	(Greece)
G	9	Jenaya Wade-Fray	23 – 5 September 1988	1.75 m (5 ft 9 in)	UWIC Archers	(United Kingdom)
F	10	Julie Page	29 – 21 April 1983	1.88 m (6 ft 2 in)	Energa Toruń	(Poland)
PF	11	Kim Butler	29 – 7 September 1982	1.89 m (6 ft 2 in)	SK Cēsis	(Latvia)
C	12	Dominique Allen	22 – 10 September 1989	1.92 m (6 ft 4 in)	Oral Roberts University	(United States)
G	13	Jo Leedham	24 – 5 December 1987	1.80 m (5 ft 11 in)	Bulleen Boomers	(Australia)
C	14	Azania Stewart	23 – 13 March 1989	1.92 m (6 ft 4 in)	University of Florida	(United States)
F	15	Temi Fagbenle	19 – 8 September 1992	1.92 m (6 ft 4 in)	Harvard University	(United States)

Head coach

- (Australia) Tom Maher

Assistant coach(es)

- (Canada) Ken Shields

Legend
- Club is latest as prior to tournament.
- Age is as at 29 July 2012.

==== Group play ====
Pos	Team	Pld	W	L	PF	PA	PD	Pts	Qualification
1	France	5	5	0	356	319	+37	10	Quarterfinals
2	Australia	5	4	1	353	322	+31	9	Quarterfinals
3	Russia	5	3	2	314	308	+6	8	Quarterfinals
4	Canada	5	2	3	328	332	−4	7	Quarterfinals
5	Brazil	5	1	4	329	354	−25	6	
6	Great Britain (H)	5	0	5	327	372	−45	5	

Source: [ FIBA archive]
Rules for classification: 1) points; 2) head-to-head points; 3) head-to-head goal average; 4) head-to-head number of points scored.
(H) Hosts

28 July 2012
22:15

Report

Australia	74–58	Great Britain
Scoring by quarter: 16–11, 23–15, 18–16, 17–16
Pts: Jackson 18; Rebs: Batkovic 7 Asts: Richards 4		Pts: Vanderwal, Leedham 11; Rebs: Page 7 Asts: Stafford, Leedham 3

Basketball Arena, London
Referees: Jorge Carrion (PUR), Shoko Sugruro (JPN), Borys Ryschyk (UKR)

30 July 2012
20:00

Report

Great Britain	65–73	Canada
Scoring by quarter: 15–19, 17–17, 21–19, 12–18
Pts: Stafford, Leedham 15; Rebs: Fagbenle 6 Asts: Collins 4		Pts: Thorburn 18; Rebs: Pilypaitis, T. Tatham 5 Asts: Gabriele 7

Basketball Arena, London
Referees: Juan Arteaga (ESP), Saša Pukl (SLO), Vitalis Gode (KEN)

1 August 2012
16:45

Report

Great Britain	61–67	Russia
Scoring by quarter: 14–16, 13–23, 18–13, 16–15
Pts: Stafford 18; Rebs: Page 7 Asts: Collins, Leedham 3		Pts: Belyakova 12; Rebs: Osipova 9 Asts: Hammon 6

Basketball Arena, London
Referees: Felicia Grinter (USA), Rabah Noujaim (LIB), Jorge Vázquez (PUR)

3 August 2012
20:00

Report

France	80–77 (OT)	Great Britain
Scoring by quarter: 10–13, 17–10, 20–21, 20–23, Overtime: 13–10
Pts: Gruda, Lawson-Wade 16; Rebs: Godin 8 Asts: Godin 4		Pts: Leedham 29; Rebs: Page, Leedham 8 Asts: Page 3

Basketball Arena, London
Referees: Ilija Belošević (SRB), Oļegs Latiševs (LAT), Snehal Bendke (IND)

5 August 2012
22:15

Report

Great Britain	66–78	Brazil
Scoring by quarter: 19–19, 17–20, 17–25, 13–14
Pts: Stafford 15; Rebs: Stafford 10; Asts: Stafford 4		Pts: Santos 16; Rebs: Santos 13; Asts: Pinto 12

Basketball Arena, London
Referees: Christos Christodoulou (GRE), William Kennedy (USA), Peng Ling (CHN)

== Boxing ==
=== Men ===
Britain was guaranteed five male boxers at the Games and one female entrant, by virtue of being the host nation. However following the 2011 World Championships, five British boxers had claimed their places. The special 'host' places for men's boxing therefore became void. The boxers who qualified through the world championships were; Andrew Selby, Luke Campbell, Tom Stalker, Fred Evans and Anthony Joshua.

Following the World Championships Andrew Selby and Khalid Yafai had both attained the qualification standard for the Olympics in the flyweight division. NOCs may only nominate one boxer per event, and since both had reached the quarter finals of the World Championships, a box off was required. The box off took place at the York Hall during the 2011 British Championships in November. Selby won the first bout, following which Yafai failed to make the weight for the second bout by 300 grams, meaning that Selby would represent Great Britain at the Olympics.

In the subsequent AIBA European Qualification Tournament, two further boxers, Josh Taylor and Anthony Ogogo, also qualified.

Athlete	Event	Round of 32	Round of 16	Quarterfinals	Semifinals	Final	
Athlete	Event	Opposition Result	Opposition Result	Opposition Result	Opposition Result	Opposition Result	Rank
Andrew Selby	Flyweight	Bye	Suleimenov (KAZ); W 19–15	Ramírez (CUB); L 11–16	Did not advance		
Luke Campbell	Bantamweight	Bye	Parrinello (ITA); W 11–9	Dalakliev (BUL); W 16–15	Shimizu (JPN); W 20–11	Nevin (IRL); W 14–11	1st place, gold medalist(s)
Josh Taylor	Lightweight	Conceição (BRA); W 13–9	Valentino (ITA); L 10–15	Did not advance			
Tom Stalker	Light welterweight	Bye	Manoj (IND); W 20–16	Mönkh-Erdene (MGL); L 22–23	Did not advance		
Fred Evans	Welterweight	Abbadi (ALG); W 18–10	Kavaliauskas (LTU); W 11–7	Clayton (CAN); W 14–14	Shelestyuk (UKR); W 11–10	Sapiyev (KAZ); L 9–17	2nd place, silver medalist(s)
Anthony Ogogo	Middleweight	Castillo (DOM); W 13–6	Khytrov (UKR); W 18–18	Härtel (GER); W 15–10	Falcão (BRA); L 9–16	Did not advance	3rd place, bronze medalist(s)
Anthony Joshua	Super heavyweight	Not scheduled	Savón (CUB); W 17–16	Zhang Zl (CHN); W 15–11	Dychko (KAZ); W 13–11	Cammarelle (ITA); W 18^{+}–18	1st place, gold medalist(s)

=== Women ===
Qualification for the women's events was held at the AIBA 2012 Women's World Championships only. On 16 May 2012, Natasha Jonas qualified in the 60 kg category, and Nicola Adams in the 51 kg category. As a result, the host quota place in women's boxing became void. On 18 May 2012 Savannah Marshall qualified in the 75 kg category, ensuring Great Britain is represented at all women's weights at the first Olympic Games featuring the women's discipline.

Athlete	Event	Round of 16	Quarterfinals	Semifinals	Final	
Athlete	Event	Opposition Result	Opposition Result	Opposition Result	Opposition Result	Rank
Nicola Adams	Flyweight	Bye	Petrova (BUL); W 16–7	Kom (IND); W 11–6	Ren Cc (CHN); W 16–7	1st place, gold medalist(s)
Natasha Jonas	Lightweight	Underwood (USA); W 21–13	Taylor (IRL); L 15–26	Did not advance		
Savannah Marshall	Middleweight	Bye	Volnova (KAZ); L 12–16	Did not advance		

== Canoeing ==
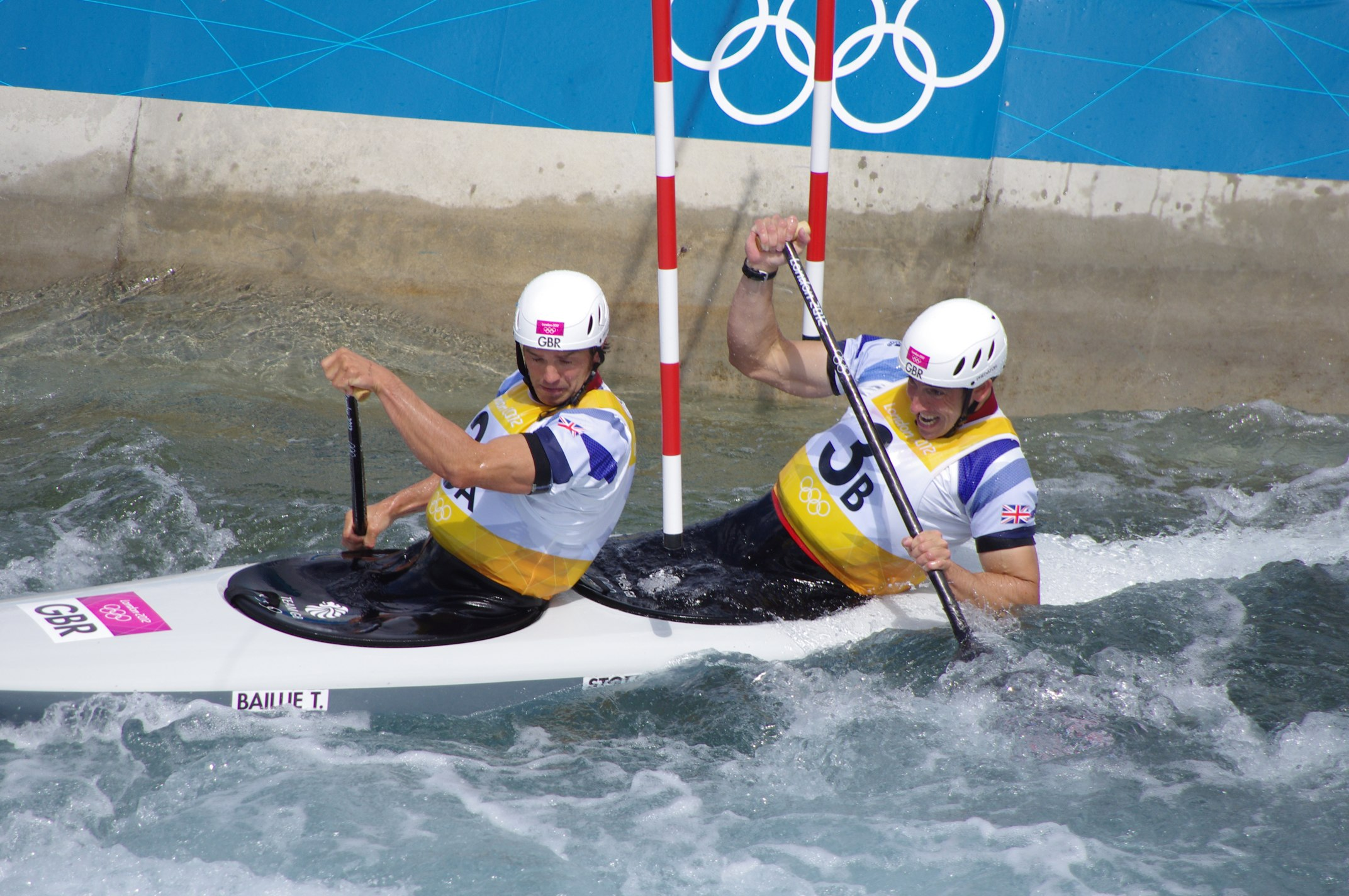
Gold medallists Tim Baillie and Etienne Stott competing in the Men's C-2.

=== Slalom ===
Britain qualified the maximum of one boat in all four classes, at the 2011 World Championships.

Places were allocated in Team GB in a qualification event in April 2012. As stated above, Great Britain was entitled to one quota of two canoeists in the men's C-2 event; however, as the successful C-2 canoeists Florence and Hounslow had already qualified in the individual events, a quota for a second boat in C-2 became available.

Athlete	Event	Preliminary						Semifinal		Final	
Athlete	Event	Run 1	Rank	Run 2	Rank	Best	Rank	Time	Rank	Time	Rank
David Florence	Men's C-1	101.60	13	93.04	4	93.04	5 Q	106.16	10	Did not advance	
Tim Baillie; Etienne Stott	Men's C-2	100.44	3	102.79	6	100.44	4 Q	110.78	6 Q	106.41	1st place, gold medalist(s)
David Florence; Richard Hounslow	Men's C-2	108.23	10	101.08	4	101.08	7 Q	108.93	1 Q	106.77	2nd place, silver medalist(s)
Richard Hounslow	Men's K-1	94.40	=14	89.12	8	89.12	11 Q	104.30	12	Did not advance	
Lizzie Neave	Women's K-1	101.95	4	98.92	1	98.92	2 Q	117.30	12	Did not advance	

=== Sprint ===
The canoe sprint allocation for the host nation was one place in the men's K-1 1000 m, men's C-1 1000 m and women's K-1 500 m. Team GB was expected to earn a healthy number of British quota places.

==== Men ====
Athlete	Event	Heats		Semifinals		Final	
Athlete	Event	Time	Rank	Time	Rank	Time	Rank
Tim Brabants	K-1 1000 m	3:31.869	5 Q	3:30.769	4 FA	3:34.833	8
Ed McKeever	K-1 200 m	35.087 OB	1 Q	35.619	1 FA	36.246	1st place, gold medalist(s)
Liam Heath; Jon Schofield	K-2 200 m	33.364	2 Q	32.940	2 FA	34.421	3rd place, bronze medalist(s)
Richard Jefferies	C-1 200 m	42.516	3 Q	43.213	6	Did not advance	
Richard Jefferies	C-1 1000 m	4:48.511	8 Q	4:49.874	8 FB	4:42.992	15

==== Women ====
Athlete	Event	Heats		Semifinals		Final	
Athlete	Event	Time	Rank	Time	Rank	Time	Rank
Rachel Cawthorn	K-1 500 m	1:53.491	1 Q	1:52.542	2 FA	1:53.345	6
Jessica Walker	K-1 200 m	42.388	4 Q	41.734	2 FA	46.161	7
Abigail Edmonds; Louisa Sawers	K-2 500 m	1:46.564	5 Q	1:46.025	7 FB	1:46.341	11
Rachel Cawthorn; Angela Hannah; Louisa Sawers; Jessica Walker	K-4 500 m	1:37.255	2 Q	1:32.550	4 FA	1:33.055	5

FA
Qualify to final (medal)
FB
Qualify to final B (non-medal)

== Cycling ==
Great Britain selected 27 cyclists across the four cycling disciplines. Included in the squad was David Millar, who was cleared to compete after a British Olympic Association rule preventing any athlete formerly banned for doping from Olympic selection, was overturned.

In the road events Bradley Wiggins won the gold medal and Chris Froome the bronze in the men's time trial. This was Wiggins seventh Olympic medal and took him past Steve Redgrave as the British athlete with the most Olympic medals. He also became the first man to win the Tour de France and an Olympic gold medal in the same year.

On the track the men's sprint team of Chris Hoy, Jason Kenny and Philip Hindes set new world records in both the first round and again in the final against France as they won the gold medal. Hoy joined Steve Redgrave as the only British athletes to win five Olympic gold medals. A sixth gold medal in the men's Keirin brought Hoy past the record of Redgrave, and brought him equal with Wiggins on seven Olympic medals

=== Road ===
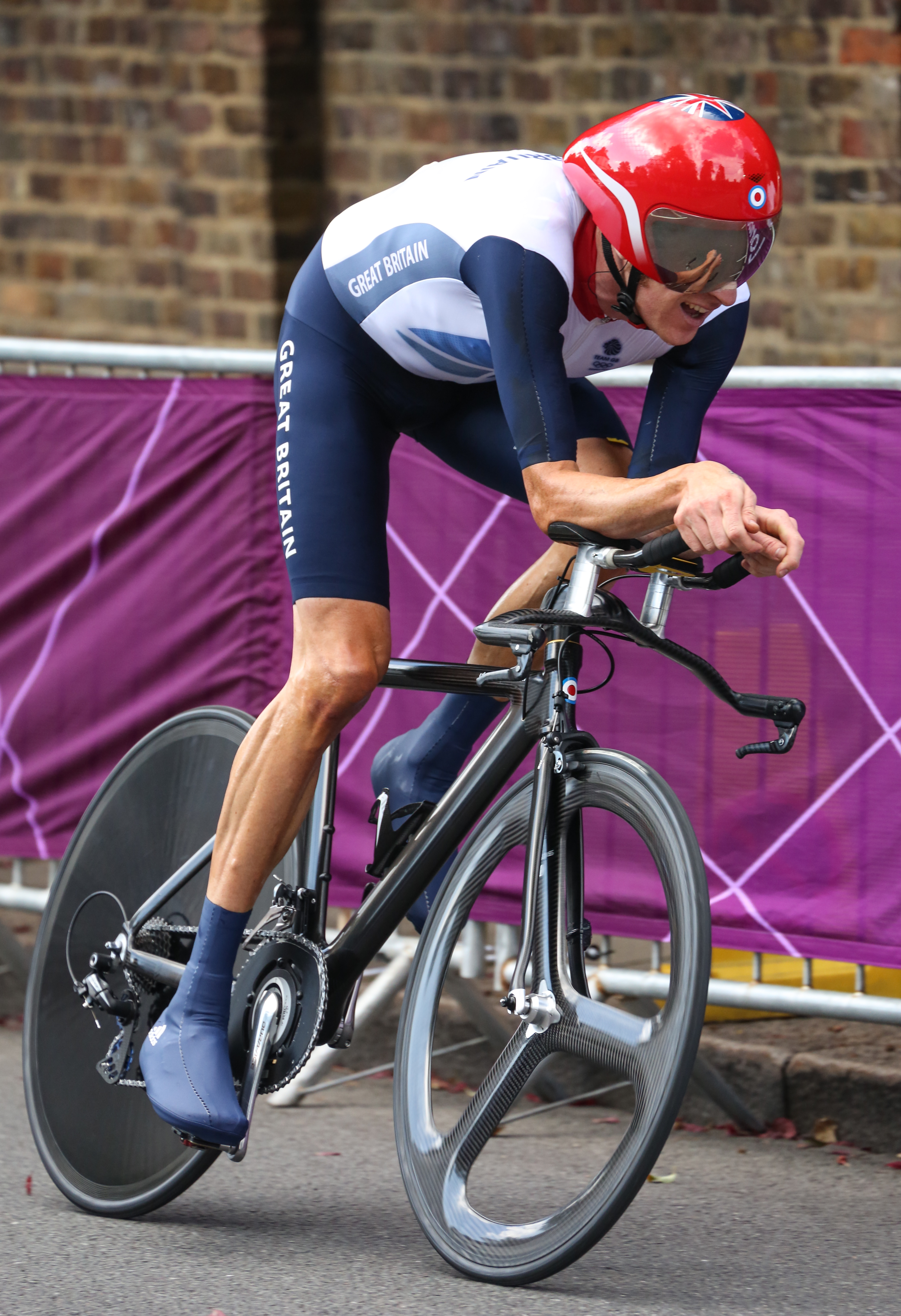
Bradley Wiggins competing in the men's time trial, an event in which he won his British record seventh Olympic medal.

Great Britain qualified for a maximum five quota places in the men's Olympic road race by virtue of their top 10 national ranking in the 2011 UCI World Tour. They qualified a maximum 4 quota places in the women's event by virtue of a top 5 national ranking by the end of May 2012.

The BOA announced the five man squad of road racers for Team GB on 4 July 2012.

==== Men ====
Athlete	Event	Time	Rank
Mark Cavendish	Road race	5:46:37	29
Chris Froome	Road race	5:58:24	109
Chris Froome	Time trial	51:41.87	3rd place, bronze medalist(s)
David Millar	Road race	5:55:16	105
Ian Stannard	Road race	5:46:47	92
Bradley Wiggins	Road race	5:47:14	100
Bradley Wiggins	Time trial	50:39.54	1st place, gold medalist(s)

==== Women ====
Athlete	Event	Time	Rank
Lizzie Armitstead	Road race	3:35:29	2nd place, silver medalist(s)
Lizzie Armitstead	Time trial	39:26.24	10
Nicole Cooke	Road race	3:36:01	31
Lucy Martin	Road race	OTL	
Emma Pooley	Road race	3:37:26	40
Emma Pooley	Time trial	38:37.70	6

=== Track ===
Qualification for the ten events to be held in the Olympic velodrome was entirely dependent on UCI rankings. Entry was limited to one rider, or as the case may be one team, per nation, a rule widely viewed as an attempt to reduce the dominance of the Great Britain team from the 2008 Games where they had taken gold and silver in three events (men's sprint, men's keirin and women's pursuit), and gold and bronze in a further one (men's pursuit). Nations are also limited to 14 riders in total, although 2 riders from other cycling disciplines may also be called upon.

Great Britain qualified in all track events. On 18 June 2012, British Cycling confirmed two accredited 'P' places – sprinters Ross Edgar and Becky James – essentially, substitute riders officially selected for the Olympic squad in the event of injury or illness. Competitors in the individual sprint and keirin events to be chosen from respective team sprint squads.

==== Sprint ====
Athlete	Event	Qualification		Round 1	Repechage 1	Round 2	Repechage 2	Quarterfinals	Semifinals	Final	
Athlete	Event	Time Speed (km/h)	Rank	Opposition Time Speed (km/h)	Opposition Time Speed (km/h)	Opposition Time Speed (km/h)	Opposition Time Speed (km/h)	Opposition Time Speed (km/h)	Opposition Time Speed (km/h)	Opposition Time Speed (km/h)	Rank
Jason Kenny	Men's sprint	9.713 OR; 74.127	1	Bye		Esterhuizen (RSA); W 10.363; 69.477	Bye	Awang (MAS); W 10.433, W 10.030	Phillip (TRI); W 10.159, W 10.166	Baugé (FRA); W 10.232, W 10.308	1st place, gold medalist(s)
Victoria Pendleton	Women's sprint	10.724 OR; 67.139	1	Gnidenko (RUS); W 11.775; 61.146	Bye	Kanis (NED); W 11.840; 60.810	Bye	Panarina (BLR); W 11.226, W 11.339	Vogel (GER); W 11.481, W 11.538	Meares (AUS); L REL, L	2nd place, silver medalist(s)

==== Team sprint ====
Athlete	Event	Qualification		Semifinals		Final	
Athlete	Event	Time Speed (km/h)	Rank	Opposition Time Speed (km/h)	Rank	Opposition Time Speed (km/h)	Rank
Philip Hindes; Chris Hoy; Jason Kenny	Men's team sprint	43.065 OR; 62.695	1 Q	Japan; W 42.747 WR; 63.162	1 Q	France; W 42.600 WR; 63.380	1st place, gold medalist(s)
Victoria Pendleton; Jessica Varnish	Women's team sprint	32.526 WR; 55.340	2 Q	Ukraine; L REL	8	did not advance	

==== Pursuit ====
Athlete	Event	Qualification		Semifinals		Final	
Athlete	Event	Time	Rank	Opponent Results	Rank	Opponent Results	Rank
Steven Burke; Ed Clancy; Peter Kennaugh; Geraint Thomas	Men's team pursuit	3:52.499 WR	1 Q	Denmark; W 3:52.743	1	Australia; W 3:51.659 WR	1st place, gold medalist(s)
Dani King; Joanna Rowsell; Laura Trott	Women's team pursuit	3:15.669 WR	1 Q	Canada; W 3:14.682 WR	1	United States; W 3:14.051 WR	1st place, gold medalist(s)

- Andy Tennant and Wendy Houvenaghel were selected as part of the pursuit squads but did not ride during the event.

==== Keirin ====
Athlete	Event	1st round	Repechage	2nd round	Final
Athlete	Event	Rank	Rank	Rank	Rank
Chris Hoy	Men's keirin	1 Q	Bye	1 Q	1st place, gold medalist(s)
Victoria Pendleton	Women's keirin	1 Q	Bye	1 Q	1st place, gold medalist(s)

==== Omnium ====
Athlete	Event	Flying lap		Points race		Elimination race	Individual pursuit		Scratch race	Time trial		Total points	Rank
Athlete	Event	Time	Rank	Points	Rank	Rank	Time	Rank	Rank	Time	Rank	Total points	Rank
Ed Clancy	Men's omnium	12.556	1	18	11	5	4:20.853	2	10	1:00.981	1	30	3rd place, bronze medalist(s)
Laura Trott	Women's omnium	14.057	1	14	10	1	3:30.547	2	3	35.110	1	18	1st place, gold medalist(s)

=== Mountain biking ===
Athlete	Event	Time	Rank
Liam Killeen	Men's cross-country	did not finish	
Annie Last	Women's cross-country	1:33:47	8

=== BMX ===
The cyclists below were selected for the BMX events. On 18 June 2012, British Cycling announced that two further riders – Kyle Evans and Abbie Taylor – had been granted 'P' accreditations, and would be substitute riders in the event of illness or injury.

Athlete	Events	Seeding		Quarterfinal		Semifinal		Final	
Athlete	Events	Result	Rank	Points	Rank	Points	Rank	Result	Rank
Liam Phillips	Men's BMX	38.719	12	6	2 Q	9	3 Q	2:11.918	8
Shanaze Reade	Women's BMX	39.368	5	Not scheduled		5	2 Q	39.247	6

== Diving ==
As hosts Great Britain were automatically entitled to places in all four synchronised diving events, but athletes for individual events had to qualify through their own performances. Through finishes at the 2011 World Aquatics Championships, the 2012 FINA Diving World Cup event in London, and the dive-off on the final day of the 2012 event, Great Britain achieved the maximum allowable number of quota places; two in each individual event.

=== Men ===
Athlete	Event	Preliminaries		Semifinals		Final	
Athlete	Event	Points	Rank	Points	Rank	Points	Rank
Jack Laugher	3 m springboard	330.00	27	Did not advance			
Chris Mears	3 m springboard	436.05	18 Q	461.00	9 Q	439.75	9
Tom Daley	10 m platform	448.45	15 Q	521.10	4 Q	556.95	3rd place, bronze medalist(s)
Peter Waterfield	10 m platform	412.45	23	Did not advance			
Chris Mears; Nick Robinson-Baker	3 m synchronised springboard	Not scheduled				432.60	5
Tom Daley; Peter Waterfield	10 m synchronised platform	Not scheduled				454.65	4

=== Women ===
Athlete	Event	Preliminaries		Semifinals		Final	
Athlete	Event	Points	Rank	Points	Rank	Points	Rank
Rebecca Gallantree	3 m springboard	299.25	16 Q	267.10	18	Did not advance	
Hannah Starling	3 m springboard	298.25	17 Q	313.95	13	Did not advance	
Monique Gladding	10 m platform	301.45	19	Did not advance			
Stacie Powell	10 m platform	287.30	20	Did not advance			
Alicia Blagg; Rebecca Gallantree	3 m synchronised springboard	Not scheduled				285.60	7
Sarah Barrow; Tonia Couch	10 m synchronised platform	Not scheduled				321.72	5

== Equestrian ==
Great Britain automatically received a team and the maximum number of individual competitors in each of the 3 disciplines; dressage, eventing and show jumping.

=== Dressage ===
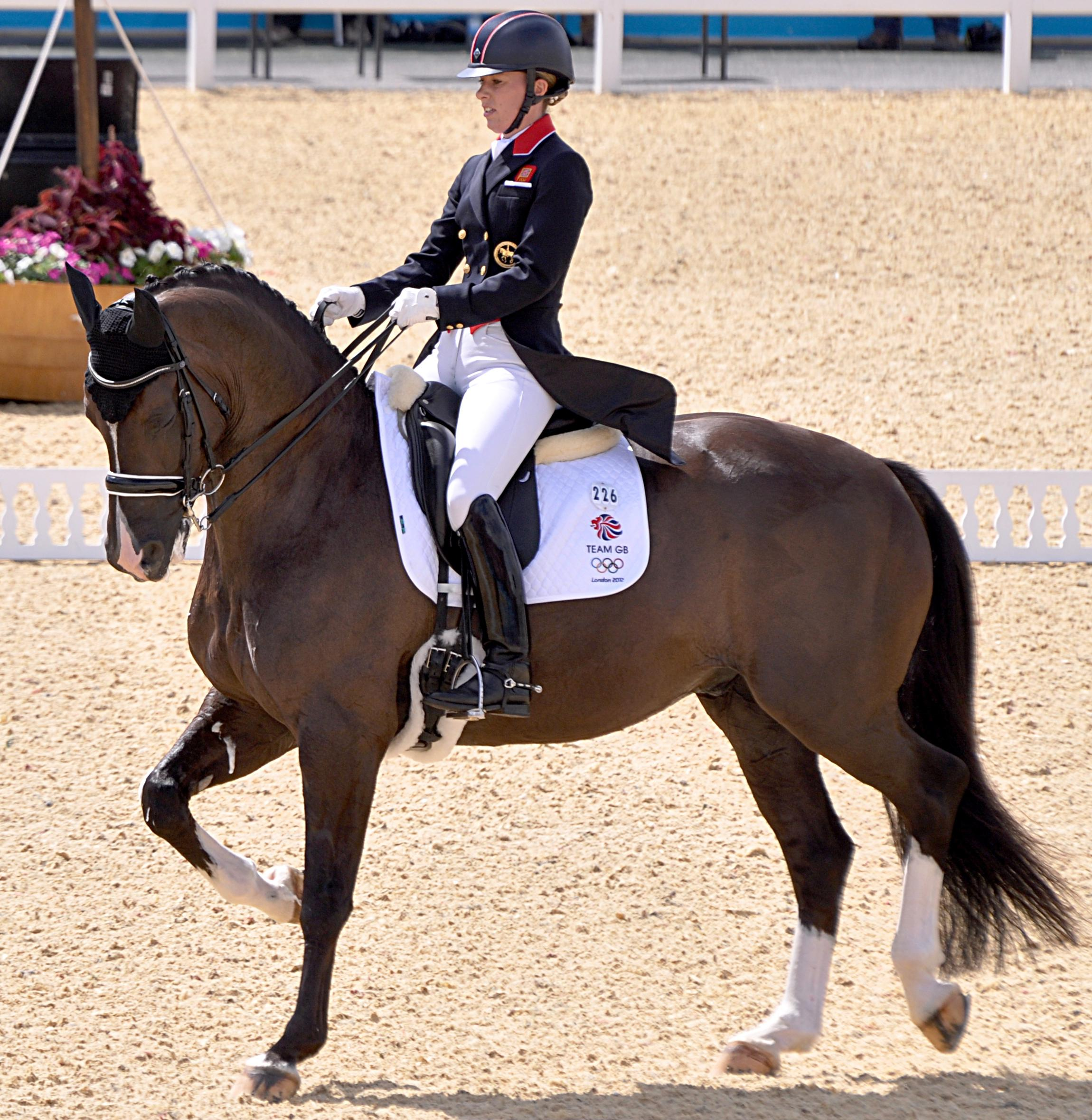
Double gold medallist Charlotte Dujardin riding Valegro.

Athlete	Horse	Event	Grand Prix		Grand Prix Special		Grand Prix Freestyle		Overall	
Athlete	Horse	Event	Score	Rank	Score	Rank	Technical	Artistic	Overall score	Rank
Laura Bechtolsheimer	Mistral Hojris	Individual	76.839	7 Q	77.794	5 Q	80.679	88.000	84.339	3rd place, bronze medalist(s)
Richard Davison	Hiscox Artemis	Individual	72.812	18 Q	70.524	26	did not advance			
Charlotte Dujardin	Valegro	Individual	83.663	1 Q	83.286	1 Q	86.750	93.429	90.089	1st place, gold medalist(s)
Carl Hester	Uthopia	Individual	77.720	5 Q	80.571	3 Q	77.714	88.000	82.857	5
Laura Bechtolsheimer; Charlotte Dujardin; Carl Hester	See above	Team	79.407	1	80.550	1	Not scheduled		79.979	1st place, gold medalist(s)

=== Eventing ===
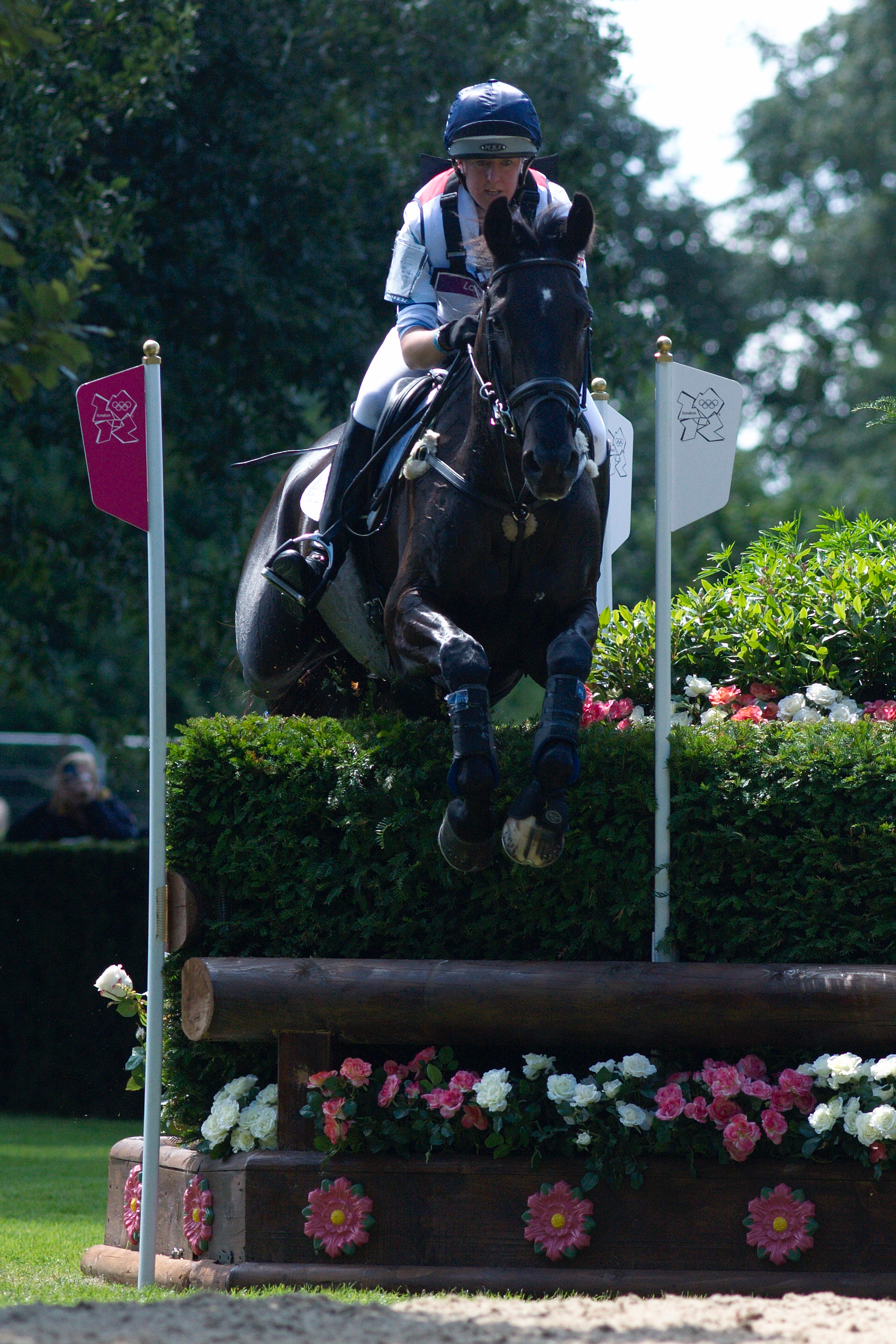
Nicola Wilson and Opposition Buzz competing in the cross-country discipline of the eventing

Athlete	Horse	Event	Dressage		Cross-country			Jumping						Total	
Athlete	Horse	Event	Dressage		Cross-country			Qualifier			Final			Total	
Athlete	Horse	Event	Penalties	Rank	Penalties	Total	Rank	Penalties	Total	Rank	Penalties	Total	Rank	Penalties	Rank
Tina Cook	Miners Frolic	Individual	42.00	14	0.00	42.00	5	1.00	43.00	4 Q	8.00	51.00	6	51.00	6
William Fox-Pitt	Lionheart	Individual	44.10	=17	9.20	53.30	22	0.00	53.30	15	did not advance			53.30	15
Mary King	Imperial Cavalier	Individual	40.90	12	1.20	42.10	6	0.00	42.10	3 Q	8.00	50.10	5	50.10	5
Zara Phillips	High Kingdom	Individual	46.10	=24	0.00	46.00	=10	7.00	53.00	14 Q	0.00	53.00	8	53.00	8
Nicola Wilson*	Opposition Buzz	Individual	51.70	=39	0.00	51.70	20	4.00	55.70	19	did not advance			55.70	19
Tina Cook; William Fox-Pitt; Mary King; Zara Phillips; Nicola Wilson	See above	Team	127.00	3	3.20	130.20	2	8.00	138.20	2	Not scheduled			138.20	2nd place, silver medalist(s)

*
Piggy French, riding DHI Topper W, was originally selected by Team GB, but withdrew on 2 July 2012 due to an injury to her horse. Nicola Wilson was promoted from the reserve team

=== Show jumping ===
Athlete	Horse	Event	Qualification								Final						
Athlete	Horse	Event	Round 1		Round 2			Round 3			Round A		Round B			Total	
Athlete	Horse	Event	Penalties	Rank	Penalties	Total	Rank	Penalties	Total	Rank	Penalties	Rank	Penalties	Total	Rank	Penalties	Rank
Scott Brash	Hello Sanctos	Individual	4	=42 Q	4	8	=31 Q	0	8	=11 Q	0	=1 Q	4	4	=5	4	=5
Peter Charles	Vindicat W	Individual	10	=65	did not advance												
Ben Maher	Tripple X III	Individual	0	=1 Q	0	0	=1 Q	4	4	=4 Q	4	=11 Q	4	8	=9	8	=9
Nick Skelton	Big Star	Individual	0	=1 Q	0	0	=1 Q	0	0	=1 Q	0	=1 Q	4	4	=5	4	=5
Scott Brash; Peter Charles; Ben Maher; Nick Skelton	See above	Team	—N/a								4	=2 Q	4	8	=1 JO	0	1st place, gold medalist(s)

JO
Jump off for gold medal

== Fencing ==
As hosts, Great Britain received eight quota places which could be allocated to any of the fencing events. Additional places could be won in specific disciplines in a series of qualification events.

On 24 March 2012, Richard Kruse won a qualifying event in Copenhagen, thus earning Team GB a ninth quota place in men's foil. On 22 April 2012, Natalia Sheppard attained a qualifying place at the Zonal European Qualifier in women's foil. On 1 June 2012, the BOA announced the first seven of ten fencers, and confirmed the remaining three fencers would be in foil events.

=== Men ===
Athlete	Event	Round of 64	Round of 32	Round of 16	Quarterfinal	Semifinal	Final / BM	
Athlete	Event	Opposition Score	Opposition Score	Opposition Score	Opposition Score	Opposition Score	Opposition Score	Rank
James-Andrew Davis	Individual foil	Bye	Joppich (GER); L 10–15	Did not advance				
Richard Kruse	Individual foil	Bye	Akhmatkhuzin (RUS); L 5–15	Did not advance				
Husayn Rosowsky	Individual foil	Samandi (MAR); L 8–15	Did not advance					
James-Andrew Davis; Richard Kruse; Husayn Rosowsky; Laurence Halsted	Team foil	Not scheduled		Egypt; W 45–33	Italy; L 45–40	Classification semi-final France; W 45–29	5th place final Russia; L 35–45	6
James Honeybone	Individual sabre	Pryiemka (BLR); L 9–15	Did not advance					

=== Women ===
Athlete	Event	Round of 64	Round of 32	Round of 16	Quarterfinal	Semifinal	Final / BM	
Athlete	Event	Opposition Score	Opposition Score	Opposition Score	Opposition Score	Opposition Score	Opposition Score	Rank
Corinna Lawrence	Individual épée	Bravo (CHI); W 15–12	Gherman (ROU); L 9–15	Did not advance				
Anna Bentley	Individual foil	Peterson (CAN); L 9–10	Did not advance					
Natalia Sheppard	Individual foil	Troiano (GBR); W 12–9	Maîtrejean (FRA); L 5–15	Did not advance				
Sophie Troiano	Individual foil	Sheppard (GBR); L 9–12	Did not advance					
Anna Bentley; Natalia Sheppard; Sophie Troiano; Martina Emanuel	Team foil	Not scheduled		Egypt; W 34–45	Italy; L 42–14	Classification semi-final Poland; L 20–43	7th place final Japan; L 21–30	8
Louise Bond-Williams	Individual sabre	Not scheduled	Vougiouka (GRE); L 8–15	Did not advance				
Sophie Williams	Individual sabre	Not scheduled	Vecchi (ITA); L 6–15	Did not advance				

== Field hockey ==
The Great Britain men's and women's teams qualified automatically as hosts. England, Wales and Scotland compete separately in most competitions, but sent a combined team to the Olympics, which was managed by England Hockey.

=== Men's tournament ===
The following is the Great Britain roster in the men's field hockey tournament of the 2012 Summer Olympics.

Head Coach: Jason Lee

4. Glenn Kirkham
7. Ashley Jackson
9. Harry Martin
10. Matthew Daly
12. Jonty Clarke
13. Robert Moore
14. Ben Hawes
17. Alastair Wilson
18. Barry Middleton (C)
20. James Tindall
23. Iain Mackay
24. Iain Lewers
25. James Fair (GK)
26. Nicholas Catlin
27. Daniel Fox
29. Richard Smith

Reserves:

- Richard Mantell
- George Pinner (GK)

Head coach Jason Lee appeared at his fifth Olympics, having played for Great Britain in 1992 and 1996, and been head coach in 2004 and 2008.

==== Group play ====
Pos	Team	Pld	W	D	L	GF	GA	GD	Pts	Qualification
1	Australia	5	3	2	0	23	5	+18	11	Semi-finals
2	Great Britain (H)	5	2	3	0	14	8	+6	9	Semi-finals
3	Spain	5	2	2	1	8	10	−2	8	Fifth place game
4	Pakistan	5	2	1	2	9	16	−7	7	Seventh place game
5	Argentina	5	1	1	3	10	14	−4	4	Ninth place game
6	South Africa	5	0	1	4	11	22	−11	1	Eleventh place game

Source: FIH
(H) Hosts

30 July 2012
19:00

Great Britain	4–1	Argentina
Middleton 22', 42'; Fox 49'; Smith 53'	Report	Ibarra 55'

Umpires:
Raghu Prasad (IND)
Christian Blasch (GER)

1 August 2012
16:00

South Africa	2–2	Great Britain
Smith 60'; Robinson 64'	Report	Jackson 14', 68'

Umpires:
Nigel Iggo (NZL)
Roel van Eert (NED)

3 August 2012
16:00

Great Britain	4–1	Pakistan
Tindall 4'; Clarke 26'; Jackson 50', 67'	Report	Abbas 70'

Umpires:
Simon Taylor (NZL)
Marcelo Servetto (ESP)

5 August 2012
19:00

Great Britain	3–3	Australia
Clarke 47'; Middleton 53'; Tindall 66'	Report	Ford 7', 11'; Knowles 41'

Umpires:
Christian Blasch (GER)
John Wright (RSA)

7 August 2012
19:00

Spain	1–1	Great Britain
Quemada 55'	Report	Jackson 33'

Umpires:
Simon Taylor (NZL)
John Wright (RSA)

==== Semi-final ====
9 August 2012
20:00

Netherlands	9–2	Great Britain
Weusthof 9', 15', 60'; Van der Weerden 22'; Bakker 33', 44', 51'; De Nooijer 47'; Evers 48'	Report	Jackson 18'; Moore 65'

Umpires:
Christian Blasch (GER)
David Gentles (AUS)

==== Bronze medal match ====
11 August 2012
15:30

(bronze) Australia	3–1	Great Britain
Orchard 17'; Dwyer 48'; Govers 57'	Report	Lewers 29'

Umpires:
Christian Blach (GER)
Gary Simmonds (RSA)

=== Women's tournament ===
==== Squad ====
The Great Britain women's field hockey team for the 2012 Games was announced on 18 May 2012.

Head Coach: Danny Kerry

1. Beth Storry (GK)
3. Emily Maguire
4. Laura Unsworth
5. Crista Cullen
6. Hannah Macleod
7. Anne Panter
8. Helen Richardson
11. Kate Walsh (C)
12. Chloe Rogers
14. Laura Bartlett
15. Alex Danson
18. Georgie Twigg
22. Ashleigh Ball
23. Sally Walton
28. Nicola White
29. Sarah Thomas

Reserves:

- Natalie Seymour
- Abi Walker

==== Group play ====
Pos	Team	Pld	W	D	L	GF	GA	GD	Pts	Qualification
1	Netherlands	5	5	0	0	12	5	+7	15	Semi-finals
2	Great Britain (H)	5	3	0	2	14	7	+7	9	Semi-finals
3	China	5	2	1	2	6	3	+3	7	
4	South Korea	5	2	0	3	9	13	−4	6	
5	Japan	5	1	1	3	4	9	−5	4	
6	Belgium	5	0	2	3	2	10	−8	2	

Source: FIH
Rules for classification: 1) Points; 2) Matches won; 3) Goal difference; 4) Goals for; 5) Head-to-head result.
(H) Hosts

29 July 2012
19:00

Great Britain	4–0	Japan
Danson 7', 28'; Thomas 23'; Walton 26'	Report

Umpires:
Kelly Hudson (NZL)
Soledad Iparraguirre (ARG)

31 July 2012
16:00

Great Britain	5–3	South Korea
White 6'; Cullen 25'; Danson 38'; Twigg 61'; Rogers 62'	Report	Kim Da-rae 18'; Han Hye-lyoung 52'; Park Mi-hyun 57'

Umpires:
Stella Bartlema (NED)
Lisa Roach (AUS)

2 August 2012
19:00

Belgium	0–3	Great Britain
	Report	Ball 32'; Bartlett 39'; Cullen 68'

Umpires:
Amy Hassick (USA)
Irene Presenqui (ARG)

4 August 2012
16:00

China	2–1	Great Britain
Fu Baorong 41'; Zhao Yudiao 47'	Report	Cullen 69'

Umpires:
Soledad Iparraguirre (ARG)
Carol Metchette (IRL)

6 August 2012
19:00

Great Britain	1–2	Netherlands
Cullen 29'	Report	van As 43' van Male 52'

Umpires:
Carolina de la Fuente (ARG)
Chieko Soma (JPN)

==== Semi-final ====
8 August 2012
20:00

Argentina	2–1	Great Britain
Barrionuevo 6'; Rebecchi 31'	Report	Danson 65'

Umpires:
Lisa Roach (AUS)
Carol Metchette (IRL)

==== Bronze medal match ====
10 August 2012
15:30

New Zealand	1–3	Great Britain (bronze)
Michelsen 68'	Report	Danson 45'; Cullen 59'; Thomas 63'

Umpires:
Soledad Iparraguirre (ARG)
Chieko Soma (JPN)

==== Final rank ====
Bronze

== Football ==
Great Britain men's football team competed at the Olympics for the first time since 1960. The team was run by The Football Association, as the national associations of Scotland, Wales and Northern Ireland declined to take part. However, despite objections from Scotland, Wales and Northern Ireland, players from all four nations were considered for selection, although Ryan Giggs, Craig Bellamy, Aaron Ramsey, Neil Taylor and Joe Allen (all Welsh) were the only non-English players who were selected. However, players chosen to represent England at the 2012 European Championships were not considered for selection, although one player (Jack Butland) received special dispensation to compete. Former England captain David Beckham, who was involved in promoting London's bid to host the Games, had expressed an interest in appearing as one of the three over-23 players in the squad. The men's team was managed by Stuart Pearce and the women's by Hope Powell.

- Men's team event – 1 team of 18 players
- Women's team event – 1 team of 18 players

=== Men's tournament ===
==== Squad ====
The following is the Great Britain squad in the men's football tournament of the 2012 Summer Olympics.

As part of an agreement with the FA, no players from England's Euro 2012 squad were selected. However, an agreement was made to allow Jack Butland to play on both squads. Butland, a late injury replacement for the Euro 2012 team, did not play in the tournament as England's third goalkeeper, and was allowed to keep his Olympic roster spot.

Coach: Stuart Pearce

No.	Pos.	Player	Date of birth (age)	Caps	Goals	2012 club
1	GK	Jack Butland	10 March 1993 (aged 19)	1	0	(The Football Association) Birmingham City
2	DF	Neil Taylor	7 February 1989 (aged 23)	1	0	(Football Association of Wales) Swansea City
3	DF	Ryan Bertrand	5 August 1989 (aged 22)	1	0	(The Football Association) Chelsea
4	DF	Danny Rose	2 July 1990 (aged 22)	1	0	(The Football Association) Tottenham Hotspur
5	DF	Steven Caulker	29 December 1991 (aged 20)	1	0	(The Football Association) Tottenham Hotspur
6	DF	Craig Dawson	6 May 1990 (aged 22)	1	0	(The Football Association) West Bromwich Albion
7	MF	Tom Cleverley	12 August 1989 (aged 22)	1	0	(The Football Association) Manchester United
8	MF	Joe Allen	14 March 1990 (aged 22)	1	0	(Football Association of Wales) Swansea City
9	FW	Daniel Sturridge	1 September 1989 (aged 22)	1	0	(The Football Association) Chelsea
10	FW	Craig Bellamy*	13 July 1979 (aged 33)	1	0	(The Football Association) Liverpool
11	MF	Ryan Giggs* (c)	29 November 1973 (aged 38)	1	0	(The Football Association) Manchester United
12	DF	James Tomkins	29 March 1989 (aged 23)	1	0	(The Football Association) West Ham United
13	MF	Jack Cork	25 June 1989 (aged 23)	1	0	(The Football Association) Southampton
14	DF	Micah Richards*	24 June 1988 (aged 24)	1	0	(The Football Association) Manchester City
15	MF	Aaron Ramsey	26 December 1990 (aged 21)	1	0	(The Football Association) Arsenal
16	MF	Scott Sinclair	25 March 1989 (aged 23)	1	0	(Football Association of Wales) Swansea City
17	FW	Marvin Sordell	17 February 1991 (aged 21)	1	0	(The Football Association) Bolton Wanderers
18	GK	Jason Steele	18 August 1990 (aged 21)	1	0	(The Football Association) Middlesbrough

* Over-aged player.

==== Group play ====
Pos	Team	Pld	W	D	L	GF	GA	GD	Pts	Qualification
1	Great Britain (H)	3	2	1	0	5	2	+3	7	Advance to knockout stage
2	Senegal	3	1	2	0	4	2	+2	5	Advance to knockout stage
3	Uruguay	3	1	0	2	2	4	−2	3	
4	United Arab Emirates	3	0	1	2	3	6	−3	1	

Source: FIFA
Rules for classification: Group stage tiebreakers
(H) Hosts
26 July 2012
20:00

Great Britain	1–1	Senegal
Bellamy 20'	Report	Konaté 82'

Old Trafford, Manchester
Attendance: 72,176
Referee: Ravshan Irmatov (Uzbekistan)

29 July 2012
19:45

Great Britain	3–1	United Arab Emirates
Giggs 16'; Sinclair 73'; Sturridge 76'	Report	Eisa 60'

Wembley Stadium, London
Attendance: 85,137
Referee: Roberto García (Mexico)

1 August 2012
19:45

Great Britain	1–0	Uruguay
Sturridge 45+1'	Report

Millennium Stadium, Cardiff
Attendance: 70,438
Referee: Yuichi Nishimura (Japan)

==== Quarter-final ====
4 August 2012
19:30

Great Britain	1–1 (a.e.t.)	South Korea
Ramsey 36' (pen.)	Report	Ji Dong-won 29'
Penalties
Ramsey (penalty scored); Cleverley (penalty scored); Dawson (penalty scored); Giggs (penalty scored); Sturridge (penalty missed)	4–5	(penalty scored) Koo Ja-cheol; (penalty scored) Baek Sung-dong; (penalty scored) Hwang Seok-ho; (penalty scored) Park Jong-woo; (penalty scored) Ki Sung-yueng

Millennium Stadium, Cardiff
Attendance: 70,171
Referee: Wilmar Roldán (Colombia)

=== Women's tournament ===
==== Squad ====
Head coach: Hope Powell

Great Britain named a squad of 18 players and 4 alternates for the tournament. During the tournament, Dunia Susi replaced Ifeoma Dieke on 30 July 2012 due to injury.

No.	Pos.	Player	Date of birth (age)	Caps	Goals	Club
1	GK	Karen Bardsley	14 October 1984 (aged 27)	1	0	(Swedish Football Association) Linköping
2	DF	Alex Scott	14 October 1984 (aged 27)	1	0	(The Football Association) Arsenal
3	DF	Steph Houghton	23 April 1988 (aged 24)	1	0	(The Football Association) Arsenal
4	MF	Jill Scott	2 February 1987 (aged 25)	1	0	(The Football Association) Everton
5	DF	Sophie Bradley	20 October 1989 (aged 22)	1	0	(The Football Association) Lincoln Ladies
6	DF	Casey Stoney (captain)	13 May 1982 (aged 30)	1	0	(The Football Association) Lincoln Ladies
7	FW	Karen Carney	1 August 1987 (aged 24)	1	0	(The Football Association) Birmingham City
8	MF	Fara Williams	25 January 1984 (aged 28)	1	0	(The Football Association) Everton
9	FW	Ellen White	9 May 1989 (aged 23)	1	0	(The Football Association) Arsenal
10	FW	Kelly Smith	29 October 1978 (aged 33)	1	0	(The Football Association) Arsenal
11	MF	Rachel Yankey	1 November 1979 (aged 32)	1	0	(The Football Association) Arsenal
12	FW	Kim Little	29 June 1990 (aged 22)	1	0	(The Football Association) Arsenal
13	DF	Ifeoma Dieke	25 February 1981 (aged 31)	1	0	(Swedish Football Association) Vittsjö GIK
14	MF	Anita Asante	27 April 1985 (aged 27)	1	0	(Swedish Football Association) Göteborg
15	FW	Eniola Aluko	21 February 1987 (aged 25)	1	0	(The Football Association) Birmingham City
16	DF	Claire Rafferty	11 January 1989 (aged 23)	1	0	(The Football Association) Chelsea
17	FW	Rachel Williams	10 January 1988 (aged 24)	0	0	(The Football Association) Birmingham City
18	GK	Rachel Brown	2 July 1980 (aged 32)	1	0	(The Football Association) Everton
19	DF	Dunia Susi	10 August 1987 (aged 24)	0	0	(The Football Association) Chelsea

Unenrolled alternate players
No.	Pos.	Player	Date of birth (age)	Caps	Goals	Club
20	FW	Jessica Clarke	5 May 1989 (aged 23)	0	0	(The Football Association) Lincoln Ladies
21	FW	Jane Ross	18 September 1989 (aged 22)	0	0	(Scottish Football Association) Glasgow City
22	GK	Emma Higgins	15 May 1986 (aged 26)	0	0	(Football Association of Iceland) KR

==== Group play ====
Pos	Team	Pld	W	D	L	GF	GA	GD	Pts	Qualification
1	Great Britain	3	3	0	0	5	0	+5	9	Qualified for the quarter-finals
2	Brazil	3	2	0	1	6	1	+5	6	Qualified for the quarter-finals
3	New Zealand	3	1	0	2	3	3	0	3	Qualified for the quarter-finals
4	Cameroon	3	0	0	3	1	11	−10	0	

Source: IOC
25 July 2012
16:00

Great Britain	1–0	New Zealand
Houghton 64'	Report

Millennium Stadium, Cardiff
Attendance: 24,445
Referee: Kari Seitz (United States)

28 July 2012
17:15

Great Britain	3–0	Cameroon
Stoney 18'; J. Scott 23'; Houghton 82'	Report

Millennium Stadium, Cardiff
Attendance: 31,141
Referee: Hong Eun-ah (South Korea)

31 July 2012
19:45

Great Britain	1–0	Brazil
Houghton 2'	Report

Wembley Stadium, London
Attendance: 70,584
Referee: Carol Anne Chenard (Canada)

==== Quarter-final ====
3 August 2012
19:30

Great Britain	0–2	Canada
	Report	Filigno 12'; Sinclair 26'

City of Coventry Stadium, Coventry
Attendance: 28,828
Referee: Sachiko Yamagishi (Japan)

== Gymnastics ==
=== Artistic ===
Great Britain fielded a full team of five gymnasts in both the men's and women's artistic gymnastics events. The women's team qualified through a top eight finish in the 2011 World Artistic Gymnastics Championships, whilst the men qualified by winning the Olympic qualification event, after failing to qualify at the world championships. Included in the squads were Louis Smith, who won a bronze medal in the pommel horse at the 2008 Games, Beth Tweddle, 2009 World Floor Champion and 2010 Uneven Bars Champion, and Rebecca Tunney, who, at the age of 15, was the youngest Team GB athlete from any sport.

==== Men ====
===== Team =====
Athlete	Event	Qualification								Final							
Athlete	Event	Apparatus						Total	Rank	Apparatus						Total	Rank
Athlete	Event	F	PH	R	V	PB	HB	Total	Rank	F	PH	R	V	PB	HB	Total	Rank
Sam Oldham	Team	14.700	—N/a	14.600	15.533	14.666	15.100	—N/a		—N/a		14.033	—N/a	14.966	14.000	—N/a	
Daniel Purvis	Team	15.200	13.400	15.033	16.100	14.733	14.733	89.199	10 Q	15.533	14.733	14.600	15.966	14.800	14.633	—N/a	
Louis Smith	Team	—N/a	15.800 Q	—N/a			13.033	—N/a		—N/a	15.966	—N/a					
Kristian Thomas	Team	15.366	14.133	14.566	16.200	14.625	15.366	90.256	5 Q	15.433	—N/a	14.433	16.550	—N/a	15.200	—N/a	
Max Whitlock	Team	15.266	14.900 Q	14.133	16.033	13.900	—N/a			15.166	15.233	—N/a	15.666	14.800	—N/a	—N/a	
Total	Team	45.832	44.833	44.199	48.333	44.024	45.199	272.420	3 Q	46.132	45.932	43.066	48.182	44.566	43.833	271.711	3rd place, bronze medalist(s)

Individual finals

Athlete	Event	Apparatus						Total	Rank
Athlete	Event	F	PH	R	V	PB	HB	Total	Rank
Daniel Purvis	All-around	15.166	14.266	14.800	16.000	13.600	14.500	88.332	13
Louis Smith	Pommel horse	—N/a	16.066	—N/a				16.066	2nd place, silver medalist(s)
Kristian Thomas	All-around	15.566	14.566	14.633	14.908	14.733	15.000	89.406	7
Kristian Thomas	Vault	—N/a			15.533	—N/a		15.533	8
Max Whitlock	Pommel horse	—N/a	15.600	—N/a				15.600	3rd place, bronze medalist(s)

==== Women ====
===== Team =====
Athlete	Event	Qualification						Final					
Athlete	Event	Apparatus				Total	Rank	Apparatus				Total	Rank
Athlete	Event	F	V	UB	BB	Total	Rank	F	V	UB	BB	Total	Rank
Imogen Cairns	Team	—N/a	14.433	—N/a	13.366	—N/a		—N/a	14.266	—N/a	13.500	—N/a	
Jennifer Pinches	Team	14.100	14.366	13.700	13.100	55.266	21	14.366	14.833	—N/a	11.833	—N/a	
Rebecca Tunney	Team	14.000	14.400	14.825	13.166	56.391	15 Q	—N/a	14.866	14.766	—N/a	—N/a	
Beth Tweddle	Team	14.433	—N/a	16.133 Q	—N/a			14.166	—N/a	15.833	—N/a	—N/a	
Hannah Whelan	Team	13.933	14.500	14.200	13.066	55.699	17 Q	14.200	—N/a	14.000	13.866	—N/a	
Total	Team	42.533	43.333	45.158	39.632	170.656	5 Q	42.732	43.965	44.599	39.199	170.495	6

===== Individual finals =====
Athlete	Event	Apparatus				Total	Rank
Athlete	Event	F	V	UB	BB	Total	Rank
Rebecca Tunney	All-around	13.933	14.866	15.000	13.133	56.392	13
Beth Tweddle	Uneven bars	—N/a		15.916	—N/a	15.916	3rd place, bronze medalist(s)
Hannah Whelan	All-around	14.133	0.000*	14.166	13.700	41.999	24

* Whelan's vault score was wiped after she fell face first during her landing.

=== Rhythmic ===
The British Olympic Association announced that the team would utilise host nation qualification places. However an agreement between British Gymnastics and the BOA stipulated that the team had to reach a target score (45.223) at a test event held in London in January 2012. They narrowly missed this target in the qualification stage by 0.273 marks. though they met the mark on the finals day.

This led to a dispute in which British Gymnastics originally argued that they should not be included in the Games as they had failed to make the mark in the agreed manner; the gymnasts argued that it was not clear the mark had to be reached on the qualification round, and that their mark in the final day (which was over the target mark) should be accepted.

On 5 March 2012, the gymnasts won their appeal, and British Gymnastics announced that the team would now be nominated for selection.

Athlete	Event	Qualification						Final					
Athlete	Event	Hoop	Ball	Clubs	Ribbon	Total	Rank	Hoop	Ball	Clubs	Ribbon	Total	Rank
Francesca Jones	Individual	24.200	24.550	21.975	23.900	94.625	24	Did not advance					

Athlete	Event	Qualification				Final			
Athlete	Event	5 balls	3 ribbons 2 hoops	Total	Rank	5 balls	3 ribbons 2 hoops	Total	Rank
Georgina Cassar; Jade Faulkner; Francesca Fox; Lynne Hutchison; Louisa Pouli; Rachel Smith	Team	24.150	23.850	48.000	12	Did not advance			

=== Trampoline ===
Athlete	Event	Qualification		Final	
Athlete	Event	Score	Rank	Score	Rank
Katherine Driscoll	Women's	100.985	9	did not advance	

== Handball ==
Great Britain's men's and women's handball teams were allowed to take up host places at the 2012 Olympics. This is the first time that Great Britain has competed in handball at the Olympics.

=== Men's tournament ===
The following is the Great Britain roster in the men's handball tournament of the 2012 Summer Olympics.

Head coaches: Dragan Đukić

No.	Pos.	Name	Date of birth (age)	Height	App.	Goals	Club
1	GK	Jesper Parker	18 April 1984 (aged 28)	2.00 m			(Sweden) IK Sävehof
3	CB	Ciaran Williams	22 December 1987 (aged 24)	1.83 m			(United Kingdom) Salford HC
4	RW	Sebastian Prieto	4 February 1987 (aged 25)	1.87 m			(Norway) Viking HK
7	CB	Christopher Mohr	12 January 1990 (aged 22)	1.87 m			(Denmark) Odder Håndbold
12	GK	Robert White	5 April 1983 (aged 29)	1.92 m			(France) HB Valence
14	RB	Steven Larsson	1 May 1981 (aged 31)	1.95 m			(Norway) Drammen HK
15	LB	Martin Hare	28 November 1989 (aged 22)	1.93 m			(Norway) Viking HK
18	CB	Daniel McMillan	12 August 1982 (aged 29)	1.89 m			(Denmark) Odder Håndbold
20	LW	Mark Hawkins	28 December 1985 (aged 26)	1.82 m			(Iceland) Afturelding
21	P	Christopher McDermott	7 June 1989 (aged 23)	2.04 m			(Iceland) Afturelding
22	P	Robin Garnham	1 May 1988 (aged 24)	1.94 m			(Norway) Fram Larvik
26	RW	Sebastien Edgar	26 May 1991 (aged 21)	1.82 m			(France) LYS Nimes
27	LW	John Pearce	23 November 1987 (aged 24)	1.90 m			(Denmark) Brabrand
28	RB	Gawain Vincent	9 March 1990 (aged 22)	1.86 m			(France) HBC Nantes

Group A

Team	Pld	W	D	L	GF	GA	GD	Pts	Qualification
Iceland	5	5	0	0	167	132	+35	10	Quarter-finals
France	5	4	0	1	159	110	+49	8	Quarter-finals
Sweden	5	3	0	2	156	115	+41	6	Quarter-finals
Tunisia	5	2	0	3	121	125	−4	4	Quarter-finals
Argentina	5	1	0	4	113	138	−25	2	
Great Britain	5	0	0	5	96	192	−96	0	

29 July 2012; 19:30	France	44 – 15	Great Britain	Copper Box, London; Attendance: 5,000; Referees: Abdulla, Bamutref (QAT)
29 July 2012; 19:30	Joli 11	(21–7)	Garnham 6	Copper Box, London; Attendance: 5,000; Referees: Abdulla, Bamutref (QAT)
29 July 2012; 19:30	2× (yellow card) 2× (suspension)	Report	3× (yellow card) 4× (suspension) 1× (red card)	Copper Box, London; Attendance: 5,000; Referees: Abdulla, Bamutref (QAT)

31 July 2012; 14:30	Great Britain	19 – 41	Sweden	Copper Box, London; Attendance: 4,382; Referees: Nikolić, Stojković (SRB)
31 July 2012; 14:30	Larsson 4	(10–24)	Ekberg 13	Copper Box, London; Attendance: 4,382; Referees: Nikolić, Stojković (SRB)
31 July 2012; 14:30	3× (yellow card) 6× (suspension) 1× (red card)	Report	3× (yellow card) 4× (suspension)	Copper Box, London; Attendance: 4,382; Referees: Nikolić, Stojković (SRB)

2 August 2012; 16:15	Great Britain	21–32	Argentina	Copper Box, London; Attendance: 4,581; Referees: Coulibaly, Diabate (CIV)
2 August 2012; 16:15	Larsson 6	(11–16)	Simonet 6	Copper Box, London; Attendance: 4,581; Referees: Coulibaly, Diabate (CIV)
2 August 2012; 16:15	4× (yellow card) 4× (suspension)	Report	3× (yellow card) 3× (suspension)	Copper Box, London; Attendance: 4,581; Referees: Coulibaly, Diabate (CIV)

4 August 2012; 09:30	Tunisia	34 – 17	Great Britain	Copper Box, London; Attendance: 4,319; Referees: Gubica, Milošević (CRO)
4 August 2012; 09:30	Toumi 10	(14–8)	Edgar 5	Copper Box, London; Attendance: 4,319; Referees: Gubica, Milošević (CRO)
4 August 2012; 09:30	3× (yellow card) 5× (suspension)	Report	3× (yellow card) 6× (suspension)	Copper Box, London; Attendance: 4,319; Referees: Gubica, Milošević (CRO)

6 August 2012; 16:15	Iceland	41 – 24	Great Britain	Copper Box, London; Attendance: 4,856; Referees: Abdulla, Bamutref (QAT)
6 August 2012; 16:15	Sigurðsson 8	(18–15)	Larsson 9	Copper Box, London; Attendance: 4,856; Referees: Abdulla, Bamutref (QAT)
6 August 2012; 16:15	3× (yellow card) 4× (suspension)	Report	3× (yellow card) 5× (suspension)	Copper Box, London; Attendance: 4,856; Referees: Abdulla, Bamutref (QAT)

=== Women's tournament ===
==== Squad ====
The following is the British roster in the women's handball tournament of the 2012 Summer Olympics.

Head coaches: Jesper Holmris, Vigdis Holmeset

No.	Pos.	Name	Date of birth (age)	Height	App.	Goals	Club
1	GK	Sarah Hargreaves	17 May 1989 (aged 23)	1.85 m	0	0	(Denmark) Slagelse FH
3	LW	Holly Lam-Moores	12 September 1990 (aged 21)	1.69 m	0	0	(United Kingdom) GB Handball
4	RW	Zoe van der Weel	14 November 1990 (aged 21)	1.61 m	0	0	(United Kingdom) GB Handball
5	CB	Nina Heglund	24 July 1993 (aged 19)	1.70 m	0	0	(United Kingdom) GB Handball
7	CB	Lynn McCafferty	16 April 1979 (aged 33)	1.68 m	0	0	(United Kingdom) GB Handball
8	P	Louise Jukes	14 April 1984 (aged 28)	1.69 m	0	0	(United Kingdom) GB Handball
9	LW	Britt Goodwin	24 April 1983 (aged 29)	1.63 m	0	0	(United Kingdom) GB Handball
10	RW	Kelsi Fairbrother	5 August 1989 (aged 22)	1.63 m	0	0	(Denmark) Team Esbjerg
11	P	Lyn Byl	1 December 1979 (aged 32)	1.72 m	0	0	(United Kingdom) GB Handball
13	RB	Yvonne Leuthold	30 January 1980 (aged 32)	1.76 m	0	0	(United Kingdom) GB Handball
17	LB	Ewa Palies	30 January 1989 (aged 23)	1.73 m	0	0	(United Kingdom) GB Handball
21	LB	Kathryn Fudge	10 November 1989 (aged 22)	1.83 m	0	0	(United Kingdom) GB Handball
66	GK	Jane Mayes	10 January 1989 (aged 23)	1.73 m	0	0	(United Kingdom) GB Handball
86	RB	Marie Gerbron	23 December 1986 (aged 25)	1.66 m	0	0	(United Kingdom) GB Handball

==== Group play ====
Team	Pld	W	D	L	GF	GA	GD	Pts	Qualification
Brazil	5	4	0	1	137	122	+15	8	Quarter-finals
Croatia	5	4	0	1	145	115	+30	8	Quarter-finals
Russia	5	3	1	1	151	125	+26	7	Quarter-finals
Montenegro	5	2	1	2	137	123	+14	5	Quarter-finals
Angola	5	1	0	4	132	142	−10	2	
Great Britain	5	0	0	5	91	166	−75	0	

28 July 2012; 19:30	Montenegro	31 – 19	Great Britain	Copper Box, London; Attendance: 3,941; Referees: Duţă, Florescu (ROU)
28 July 2012; 19:30	A. Bulatović 5	(18–12)	Gerbron 6	Copper Box, London; Attendance: 3,941; Referees: Duţă, Florescu (ROU)
28 July 2012; 19:30	3× (yellow card) 4× (suspension)	Report	3× (yellow card) 5× (suspension)	Copper Box, London; Attendance: 3,941; Referees: Duţă, Florescu (ROU)

30 July 2012; 14:30	Great Britain	16 – 37	Russia	Copper Box, London; Attendance: 4,596; Referees: Bonaventura, Bonaventura (FRA)
30 July 2012; 14:30	Byl 5	(8–17)	Turey, Chernoivanenko 5	Copper Box, London; Attendance: 4,596; Referees: Bonaventura, Bonaventura (FRA)
30 July 2012; 14:30	3× (yellow card) 1× (suspension)	Report	2× (yellow card) 4× (suspension)	Copper Box, London; Attendance: 4,596; Referees: Bonaventura, Bonaventura (FRA)

1 August 2012; 16:15	Great Britain	17 – 30	Brazil	Copper Box, London; Attendance: 4,622; Referees: Coulibaly, Diabate (CIV)
1 August 2012; 16:15	Byl, Gerbron 5	(8–17)	Rodrigues 7	Copper Box, London; Attendance: 4,622; Referees: Coulibaly, Diabate (CIV)
1 August 2012; 16:15	2× (yellow card) 3× (suspension)	Report	3× (yellow card) 3× (suspension)	Copper Box, London; Attendance: 4,622; Referees: Coulibaly, Diabate (CIV)

3 August 2012; 09:30	Angola	31 – 25	Great Britain	Copper Box, London; Attendance: 4,081; Referees: Florescu, Duţă (ROU)
3 August 2012; 09:30	Almeida 8	(14–10)	Gerbron 9	Copper Box, London; Attendance: 4,081; Referees: Florescu, Duţă (ROU)
3 August 2012; 09:30	2× (yellow card) 3× (suspension)	Report	3× (yellow card) 1× (suspension)	Copper Box, London; Attendance: 4,081; Referees: Florescu, Duţă (ROU)

5 August 2012; 16:15	Croatia	37 – 14	Great Britain	Copper Box, London; Attendance: 4,792; Referees: Marina, Minore (ARG)
5 August 2012; 16:15	three players 5	(17–6)	Fairbrother 3	Copper Box, London; Attendance: 4,792; Referees: Marina, Minore (ARG)
5 August 2012; 16:15	3× (yellow card) 3× (suspension)	Report	3× (yellow card) 4× (suspension)	Copper Box, London; Attendance: 4,792; Referees: Marina, Minore (ARG)

== Judo ==
British judoka received one place in each of the 14 categories by virtue of hosting the Olympic tournament – the maximum allocation possible.

=== Men ===
Athlete	Event	Round of 64	Round of 32	Round of 16	Quarterfinals	Semifinals	Repechage	Final / BM	
Athlete	Event	Opposition Result	Opposition Result	Opposition Result	Opposition Result	Opposition Result	Opposition Result	Opposition Result	Rank
Ashley McKenzie	−60 kg	Bye	Hiraoka (JPN); L 0000–0111	Did not advance					
Colin Oates	−66 kg	Bye	Dos Santos (AUS); W 0020–0002	Khashbaatar (MGL); W 0011–0000	Shavdatuashvili (GEO); L 0100–0000	Did not advance	Cho J-H (KOR); L 0002-0021	Did not advance	7
Daniel Williams	−73 kg	Bye	Boqiev (TJK); L 0000–1001	Did not advance					
Euan Burton	−81 kg	Bye	Valois-Fortier (CAN); L 0000–1000	Did not advance					
Winston Gordon	−90 kg	Not held	Émond (CAN); W 1000–0000	Denisov (RUS); L 0000–0010	Did not advance				
James Austin	−100 kg	Not held	Anai (JPN); L 0003–0101	Did not advance					
Christopher Sherrington	+100 kg	Not held	Andrewartha (AUS); W 1000–0000	Mikhailine (RUS); L 0011–0001	Did not advance				

=== Women ===
Athlete	Event	Round of 32	Round of 16	Quarterfinals	Semifinals	Repechage	Final / BM	
Athlete	Event	Opposition Result	Opposition Result	Opposition Result	Opposition Result	Opposition Result	Opposition Result	Rank
Kelly Edwards	−48 kg	Bye	Fukumi (JPN); L 0000–0020	Did not advance				
Sophie Cox	−52 kg	An K-a (PRK); L 0000–0010	Did not advance					
Sarah Clark	−57 kg	Pavia (FRA); L 0001–0010	Did not advance					
Gemma Howell	−63 kg	Émane (FRA); L 0000–1000	Did not advance					
Sally Conway	−70 kg	Ngarlemdana (CHA); W 1110–0002	Bosch (NED); L 0001–0010	Did not advance				
Gemma Gibbons	−78 kg	Ramirez (POR); W 1000–0000	Lkhamdegd (MGL); W 0021–0010	Verkerk (NED); W 0100–0000	Tcheuméo (FRA); W 1000–0000	Bye	Harrison (USA); L 0000–0020	2nd place, silver medalist(s)
Karina Bryant	+78 kg	Asselah (ALG); W 1000–0001	Polavder (SLO); W 0011–0000	Issanova (KAZ); W 0102–0011	Sugimoto (JPN); L 0002–0011	Bye	Kindzerska (UKR); W 0020–0011	3rd place, bronze medalist(s)

== Modern pentathlon ==
As hosts, Great Britain received one automatic qualification place per gender. A maximum of two British men and two British women were able to qualify for modern pentathlon events. In the event, Great Britain earned two quota places in each gender.

Athlete	Event	Fencing (épée one touch)			Swimming (200 m freestyle)			Riding (show jumping)			Combined: shooting/running (10 m air pistol/3000 m)			Total points	Final rank
Athlete	Event	Results	Rank	MP points	Time	Rank	MP points	Penalties	Rank	MP points	Time	Rank	MP points	Total points	Final rank
Sam Weale	Men's	17–18	=13	808	2:03.40	12	1320	24	7	1176	11:00.00	22	2360	5664	13
Nick Woodbridge	Men's	17–18	=13	808	1:57.32	2	1396	44	11	1156	11:01.66	23	2356	5716	10
Samantha Murray	Women's	18–17	=16	832	2:08.20	2	1264	60	13	1140	12:00.59	10	2120	5356	2nd place, silver medalist(s)
Mhairi Spence	Women's	19–16	=11	856	2:16.51	10	1164	104	25	1096	12:46.23	28	1936	5052	21

== Rowing ==
Great Britain qualified boats in 13 of the 14 Olympic events at the 2011 World Championships; the only boat which Britain did not qualify for the Olympics was in the women's single sculls event where Frances Houghton was one place short.

In the heats of the women's coxless pair, Helen Glover and Heather Stanning set a new Olympic record with a time of six minutes 57.29 seconds.

=== Men ===
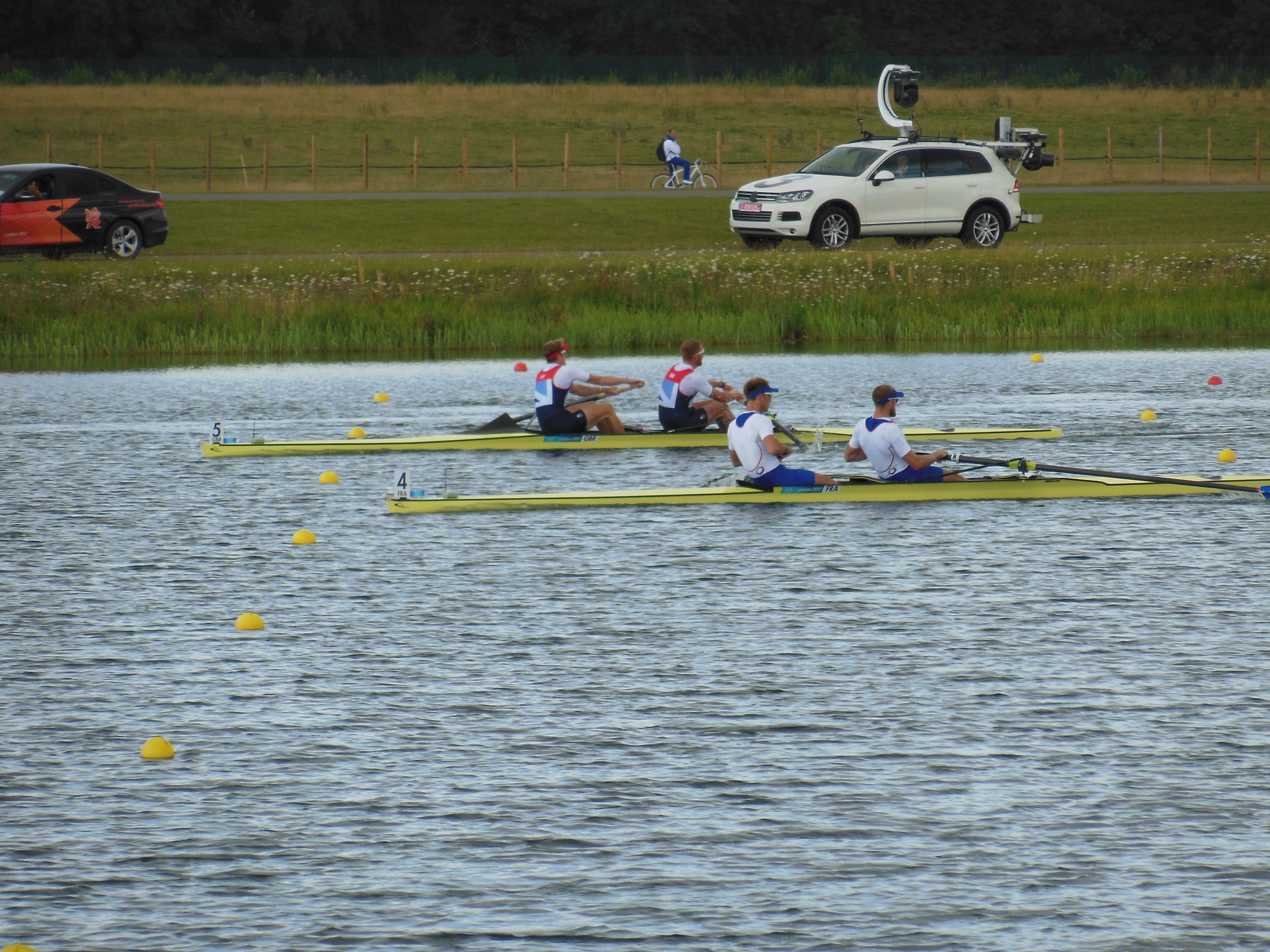
Great Britain (left boat) during the final of the men's coxless pair where they won bronze.

Athlete	Event	Heats		Repechage		Quarterfinals		Semifinals		Final	
Athlete	Event	Time	Rank	Time	Rank	Time	Rank	Time	Rank	Time	Rank
Alan Campbell	Single sculls	6:47.62	1 QF	Bye		6:52.10	1 SA/B	7:18.92	2 FA	7:03.28	3rd place, bronze medalist(s)
George Nash; Will Satch	Pair	6:16.58	1 SA/B	Bye		Not held		6:56.46	1 FA	6:21.77	3rd place, bronze medalist(s)
Bill Lucas; Sam Townsend	Double sculls	6:11.94	2 SA/B	Bye		Not held		6:22.47	3 FA	6:40.54	5
Mark Hunter; Zac Purchase	Lightweight double sculls	6:36.29	1 SA/B	Bye		Not held		6:36.62	1 FA	6:37.78	2nd place, silver medalist(s)
Alex Gregory; Tom James; Pete Reed; Andrew Triggs Hodge	Four	5:50.27	1 Q	Bye		Not held		5:58.26	1 FA	6:03.97	1st place, gold medalist(s)
Charles Cousins; Stephen Rowbotham; Tom Solesbury; Matthew Wells	Quadruple sculls	5:41.75	2 SA/B	Bye		Not held		6:05.32	3 FA	5:49.14	5
Chris Bartley; Peter Chambers; Richard Chambers; Rob Williams	Lightweight four	5:49.29	1 SA/B	Bye		Not held		5:59.68	1 FA	6:03.09	2nd place, silver medalist(s)
Richard Egington; James Foad; Matt Langridge; Constantine Louloudis; Alex Partridge; Tom Ransley; Moe Sbihi; Greg Searle; Phelan Hill (cox)	Eight	5:27.61	2 R	5:26.85	1 FA	Not held				5:52.18	3rd place, bronze medalist(s)

=== Women ===
Athlete	Event	Heats		Repechage		Semifinals		Final	
Athlete	Event	Time	Rank	Time	Rank	Time	Rank	Time	Rank
Helen Glover; Heather Stanning	Pair	6:57.29 OR	1 FA	Bye		Not held		7:27.13	1st place, gold medalist(s)
Katherine Grainger; Anna Watkins	Double sculls	6:44.33	1 FA	Bye		Not held		6:55.82	1st place, gold medalist(s)
Katherine Copeland; Sophie Hosking	Lightweight double sculls	6:56.97	1 SA/B	Bye		7:05.90	1 FA	7:09.30	1st place, gold medalist(s)
Debbie Flood; Frances Houghton; Beth Rodford; Melanie Wilson	Quadruple sculls	6:20.71	4 R	6:21.65	3 FA	Not held		6:51.54	6
Jessica Eddie; Katie Greves; Lindsey Maguire; Natasha Page; Louisa Reeve; Victoria Thornley; Annabel Vernon; Olivia Whitlam; Caroline O'Connor (cox)	Eight	6:23.51	3 R	6:21.58	4 FA	Not held		6:18.77	5

Qualification legend: FA, final A (medal); FB, final B (non-medal); FC, final C (non-medal); FD, final D (non-medal); FE, final E (non-medal); FF, final F (non-medal); SA/B, semifinals A/B; SC/D, semifinals C/D; SE/F, semifinals E/F; QF, quarterfinals; R, repechage

== Sailing ==
As hosts, Great Britain received automatic qualification places in each boat class.

=== Men ===
Athlete	Event	Race																Net points	Final rank
Athlete	Event	1	2	3	4	5	6	7	8	9	10	11	12	13	14	15	M*	Net points	Final rank
Nick Dempsey	RS:X	5	7	5	1	~~10~~	1	2	3	9	2	Not scheduled					6	41	2nd place, silver medalist(s)
Paul Goodison	Laser	10	~~23~~	16	2	4	9	17	12	9	8	Not scheduled					6	93	7
Ben Ainslie	Finn	2	2	6	~~12~~	4	3	1	3	6	1	Not scheduled					18	46	1st place, gold medalist(s)
Stuart Bithell; Luke Patience	470	2	1	4	2	3	4	1	~~6~~	3	2	Not scheduled					8	30	2nd place, silver medalist(s)
Stevie Morrison; Ben Rhodes	49er	12	12	3	18	4	2	1	1	17	4	~~20~~	13	3	17	7	10	124	5
Iain Percy; Andrew Simpson	Star	~~11~~	2	3	2	1	2	1	2	4	1	Not scheduled					16	34	2nd place, silver medalist(s)

=== Women ===
==== Fleet racing ====
Athlete	Event	Race											Net points	Final rank
Athlete	Event	1	2	3	4	5	6	7	8	9	10	M*	Net points	Final rank
Bryony Shaw	RS:X	7	6	4	~~9~~	6	8	7	5	1	5	10	59	7
Alison Young	Laser Radial	7	10	2	2	2	11	6	8	~~BFD~~	4	8	60	5
Saskia Clark; Hannah Mills	470	6	1	4	6	1	6	5	2	~~8~~	2	18	51	2nd place, silver medalist(s)

==== Match racing ====
Athlete	Event	Round robin											Rank	Knockouts			Rank
Athlete	Event	DEN	ESP	POR	AUS	FIN	FRA	NZL	RUS	SWE	NED	USA	Rank	Quarter- final	Semi- final	Final	Rank
Lucy MacGregor; Kate MacGregor; Annie Lush	Elliott 6m	W	L	W	L	W	W	L	L	W	L	L	7 Q	RUS; L (2–3)	Did not advance		7*

- Due to the lack of wind the 5–8th place classification races were cancelled. The final round robin table was used for classification.

BFD
Disqualified under the black flag rule.
M
Medal races. Points awarded in medal races are double the position achieved in the race.

== Shooting ==
As the host nation, Great Britain were awarded a minimum of nine quota places in nine different events. Additional places have been secured by Richard Brickell in the men's skeet, Richard Faulds and Peter Wilson in the men's double trap and Georgina Geikie in women's 25 m pistol. In addition, a shooter that has qualified for one event may compete in others without affecting the quotas.

On 28 May 2012, the Great Britain team was confirmed.

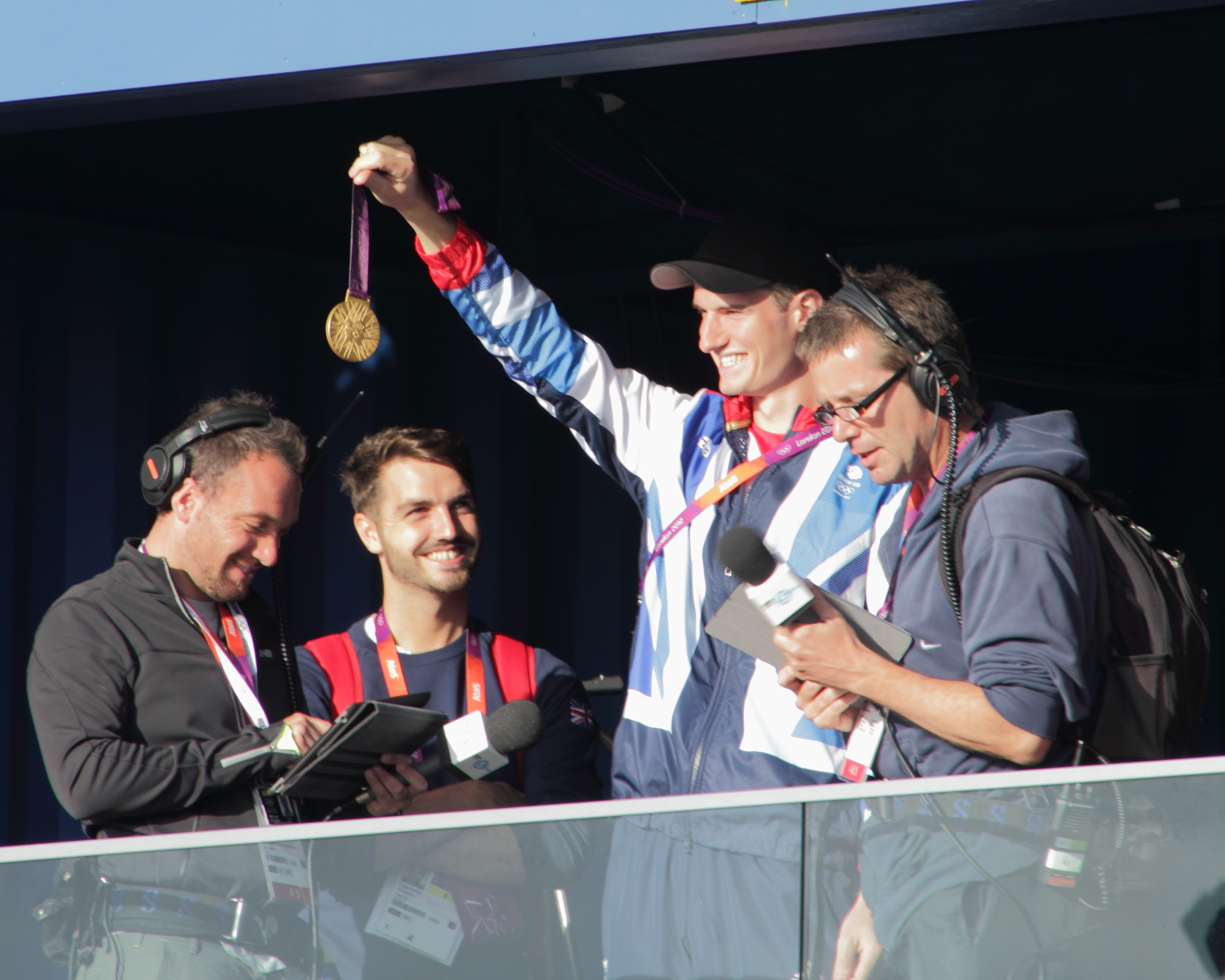
Peter Wilson showing his 2012 Olympic gold medal

=== Men ===
Athlete	Event	Qualification		Final	
Athlete	Event	Points	Rank	Points	Rank
Richard Brickell	Skeet	118	12	Did not advance	
Richard Faulds	Double trap	133	12	Did not advance	
Jon Hammond	50 m rifle 3 positions	1142	41	Did not advance	
Jon Hammond	50 m rifle prone	593	17	Did not advance	
James Huckle	50 m rifle 3 positions	1162	25	Did not advance	
James Huckle	50 m rifle prone	591	29	Did not advance	
James Huckle	10 m air rifle	593	24	Did not advance	
Edward Ling	Trap	118	21	Did not advance	
Rory Warlow	Skeet	118	16	Did not advance	
Peter Wilson	Double trap	143	1 Q	188	1st place, gold medalist(s)

=== Women ===
Athlete	Event	Qualification		Final	
Athlete	Event	Points	Rank	Points	Rank
Elena Allen	Skeet	60	14	Did not advance	
Georgina Geikie	25 m pistol	562	37	Did not advance	
Georgina Geikie	10 m air pistol	359	47	Did not advance	
Charlotte Kerwood	Trap	64	16	Did not advance	
Jennifer McIntosh	50 m rifle 3 positions	570	42	Did not advance	
Jennifer McIntosh	10 m air rifle	392	36	Did not advance	

== Swimming ==
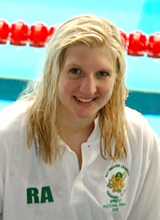
Double bronze medallist Rebecca Adlington

British swimmers have achieved qualifying standards in the following events (up to a maximum of 2 swimmers in each event at the Olympic Qualifying Time (OQT), and 1 at the Olympic Selection Time (OST)): All British swimmers must qualify by finishing in the top two of the Olympic trials having gained the GB qualifying A standard set by British Swimming in the relevant final (that time being the fastest time of the sixteenth fastest swimmer internationally in that event in 2011).

=== Men ===
Athlete	Events	Heat		Semifinal		Final	
Athlete	Events	Time	Rank	Time	Rank	Time	Rank
Craig Benson	100 m breaststroke	1:00.04	13 Q	1:00.13	14	Did not advance	
Adam Brown	50 m freestyle	22.39	20	Did not advance			
Adam Brown	100 m freestyle	49.20	20	Did not advance			
David Carry	400 m freestyle	3:47.25	7 Q	Not scheduled		3:48.62	7
David Davies	1500 m freestyle	15:14.77	16	Not scheduled		Did not advance	
Daniel Fogg	1500 m freestyle	14:56.12	5 Q	Not scheduled		15:00.76	8
Daniel Fogg	10 km open water	Not scheduled				1:50:37.3	5
James Goddard	200 m individual medley	1:58.56	6 Q	1:58.49	=7 Q	1:59.05	7
Antony James	100 m butterfly	53.25	31	Did not advance			
Michael Jamieson	100 m breaststroke	59.89	9 Q	59.89	9	Did not advance	
Michael Jamieson	200 m breaststroke	2:08.98	2 Q	2:08.20	1 Q	2:07.43	2nd place, silver medalist(s)
Ieuan Lloyd	200 m freestyle	1:48.52	19	Did not advance			
Marco Loughran	200 m backstroke	1:58.72	18	Did not advance			
Roberto Pavoni	200 m butterfly	1:57.55	20	Did not advance			
Roberto Pavoni	400 m individual medley	4:15.56	13	Not scheduled		Did not advance	
Robbie Renwick	200 m freestyle	1:46.86	6 Q	1:46.65	=6 Q	1:46.53	6
Robbie Renwick	400 m freestyle	3:47.25	10	Not scheduled		Did not advance	
Michael Rock	100 m butterfly	52.56	23	Did not advance			
Joseph Roebuck	200 m butterfly	1:56.99	=17	Did not advance			
Joseph Roebuck	200 m individual medley	2:00.04	15 Q	1:59.57	11	Did not advance	
Joseph Roebuck	400 m individual medley	4:20.24	24	Not scheduled		Did not advance	
Liam Tancock	100 m backstroke	53.86	8 Q	53.25	3 Q	53.35	5
Chris Walker-Hebborn	100 m backstroke	54.78	20	Did not advance			
Chris Walker-Hebborn	200 m backstroke	1:59.00	22	Did not advance			
Andrew Willis	200 m breaststroke	2:09.33	3 Q	2:08.47	3 Q	2:09.44	8
Simon Burnett; James Disney-May; Craig Gibbons; Grant Turner	4 × 100 m freestyle relay	3:17.08	12	Not scheduled		Did not advance	
Rob Bale; David Carry**; Ross Davenport; Ieuan Lloyd; Robbie Renwick	4 × 200 m freestyle relay	7:10.70	3 Q	Not scheduled		7:09.33	6
Craig Benson**; Adam Brown; Michael Jamieson; Liam Tancock; Michael Rock	4 × 100 m medley relay	3:33.44	2 Q	Not scheduled		3:32.32	4

Qualifiers for the latter rounds (Q) of all events were decided on a time only basis, therefore positions shown are overall results versus competitors in all heats.

=== Women ===
Athlete	Events	Heat		Semifinal		Final	
Athlete	Events	Time	Rank	Time	Rank	Time	Rank
Rebecca Adlington	400 m freestyle	4:05.75	8 Q	Not scheduled		4:03.01	3rd place, bronze medalist(s)
Rebecca Adlington	800 m freestyle	8:21.78	1 Q	Not scheduled		8:20.32	3rd place, bronze medalist(s)
Sophie Allen	200 m individual medley	2:14.72	21	Did not advance			
Georgia Davies	100 m backstroke	59.92	6 Q	1:00.56	15	Did not advance	
Eleanor Faulkner	800 m freestyle	8:38.00	17	Not scheduled		Did not advance	
Ellen Gandy	100 m butterfly	58.25	9 Q	57.66	7 Q	57.76	8
Ellen Gandy	200 m butterfly	2:09.92	17	Did not advance			
Francesca Halsall	50 m freestyle	24.61	3 Q	24.63	5 Q	24.47	5
Francesca Halsall	100 m freestyle	54.02	7 Q	53.77	=4 Q	53.66	6
Francesca Halsall	100 m butterfly	58.23	8 Q	58.52	14	Did not advance	
Kate Haywood	100 m breaststroke	1:09.22	28	Did not advance			
Joanne Jackson	400 m freestyle	4:11.50	21	Not scheduled		Did not advance	
Jemma Lowe	200 m butterfly	2:07.64	3 Q	2:07.34	8 Q	2:06.80	6
Caitlin McClatchey	200 m freestyle	1:58.03	=7 Q	1:57.33	6 Q	1:57.70	7
Hannah Miley	200 m individual medley	2:17.27	10 Q	2:10.89	7 Q	2:11.29	7
Hannah Miley	400 m individual medley	4:34.98	6 Q	Not scheduled		4:34.17	5
Siobhan-Marie O'Connor	100 m breaststroke	1:08.32	21	Did not advance			
Keri-anne Payne	10 km open water	Not scheduled				1:57:42.2	4
Stephanie Proud	200 m backstroke	2:10.01	12 Q	2:09.04	9	Did not advance	
Elizabeth Simmonds	200 m backstroke	2:10.37	15 Q	2:08.48	7 Q	2:07.26	4
Amy Smith	50 m freestyle	25.28	=16 Q*	24.87	9	Did not advance	
Amy Smith	100 m freestyle	54.02	13 Q	54.28	14	Did not advance	
Gemma Spofforth	100 m backstroke	1:00.05	12 Q	59.70	6 Q	59.20	5
Stacey Tadd	200 m breaststroke	2:27.18	18	Did not advance			
Rebecca Turner	200 m freestyle	1:58.98	17	Did not advance			
Aimee Willmott	400 m individual medley	4:38.87	11	Not scheduled		Did not advance	
Francesca Halsall; Jessica Lloyd; Caitlin McClatchey; Amy Smith; Rebecca Turner**	4 × 100 m freestyle relay	3:38.21	=7 Q	Not scheduled		3:37.02	5
Eleanor Faulkner**; Joanne Jackson; Caitlin McClatchey; Hannah Miley; Rebecca Turner	4 × 200 m freestyle relay	7:54.31	7 Q	Not scheduled		7:52.47	5
Gemma Spofforth; Siobhan-Marie O'Connor; Jemma Lowe**; Ellen Gandy; Amy Smith**; Francesca Halsall	4 × 100 m medley relay	3:59.37	6 Q	Not scheduled		3:59.46	8

Qualifiers for the latter rounds (Q) of all events were decided on a time only basis, therefore positions shown are overall results versus competitors in all heats. * Amy Smith tied equal with two other swimmers for the final spot in to the semi-finals. A swim-off was held between the three competitors, which Smith won and was awarded with the 16th qualification place in to the semi-finals. ** Competed in the heats only

== Synchronised swimming ==
As the host nation, Great Britain will have a squad of 9 synchronised swimmers taking part in both the duet and team events. British Swimming announced the squad on 8 May 2012.

Athlete	Event	Technical routine		Free routine (preliminary)			Free routine (final)		
Athlete	Event	Points	Rank	Points	Total (technical + free)	Rank	Points	Total (technical + free)	Rank
Olivia Federici; Jenna Randall	Duet	88.100	9	88.790	176.890	9 Q	89.170	177.270	9
Yvette Baker; Katie Clark; Katie Dawkins; Olivia Federici; Jennifer Knobbs; Vicki Lucass; Asha Randall; Jenna Randall; Katie Skelton	Team	87.300	6	Not scheduled			88.140	175.440	6

== Table tennis ==
Team GB fielded a six-strong table tennis team at the 2012 Olympic Games after being granted permission to use host nation qualification places.

Athlete	Event	Preliminary round	Round 1	Round 2	Round 3	Round 4	Quarterfinals	Semifinals	Final	
Athlete	Event	Opposition Result	Opposition Result	Opposition Result	Opposition Result	Opposition Result	Opposition Result	Opposition Result	Opposition Result	Rank
Paul Drinkhall	Men's singles	Bye	Al-Hasan (KUW); W 4–0	Yang Z (SIN); W 4–1	Ovtcharov (GER); L 0–4	Did not advance				
Andrew Baggaley; Paul Drinkhall; Liam Pitchford	Men's team	Not scheduled				Portugal; L 0–3	Did not advance			
Joanna Parker	Women's singles	Bye	Kumahara (BRA); W 4–0	Silbereisen (GER); L 1–4	Did not advance					
Na Liu; Joanna Parker; Kelly Sibley	Women's team	Not scheduled				North Korea; L 0–3	Did not advance			

== Taekwondo ==
Britain did not take any formal part in qualification tournaments in taekwondo, as the GB team already had four guaranteed places at their disposal, two for men, two for women. British Taekwondo nominated four athletes to take up their host quota places.

The nomination of Lutalo Muhammad for the 80 kg class was originally rejected by the BOA on 31 May 2012, following concerns over the selection process. Muhammad, European champion, and world ranked number seven, at 87 kg had been nominated in preference to double European champion at 80 kg, and world ranked number one fighter at that weight, Aaron Cook (Muhammad was ranked below 50th in the world at that weight category, at which he had rarely fought recently). On 8 June 2012, Muhammad's renewed nomination was ratified.

Athlete	Event	Round of 16	Quarterfinals	Semifinals	Repechage	Bronze medal	Final	
Athlete	Event	Opposition Result	Opposition Result	Opposition Result	Opposition Result	Opposition Result	Opposition Result	Rank
Martin Stamper	Men's −68 kg	Osornio (MEX); W 5–2	Fejzić (SRB); W 8–3	Tazegül (TUR); L 6–9	Bye	Nikpai (AFG); L 3–5	Did not advance	5
Lutalo Muhammad	Men's −80 kg	Negmatov (TJK); W 7–1	García (ESP); L 3–7	Did not advance	Karami (IRI); W 11–7	Yeremyan (ARM); W 9–3	Did not advance	3rd place, bronze medalist(s)
Jade Jones	Women's −57 kg	Gladović (SRB); W 15–1	Hamada (JPN); W 13–3	Tseng (TPE); W 10–6	Bye		Hou (CHN); W 6–4	1st place, gold medalist(s)
Sarah Stevenson	Women's −67 kg	McPherson (USA); L 1–5	Did not advance					

== Tennis ==
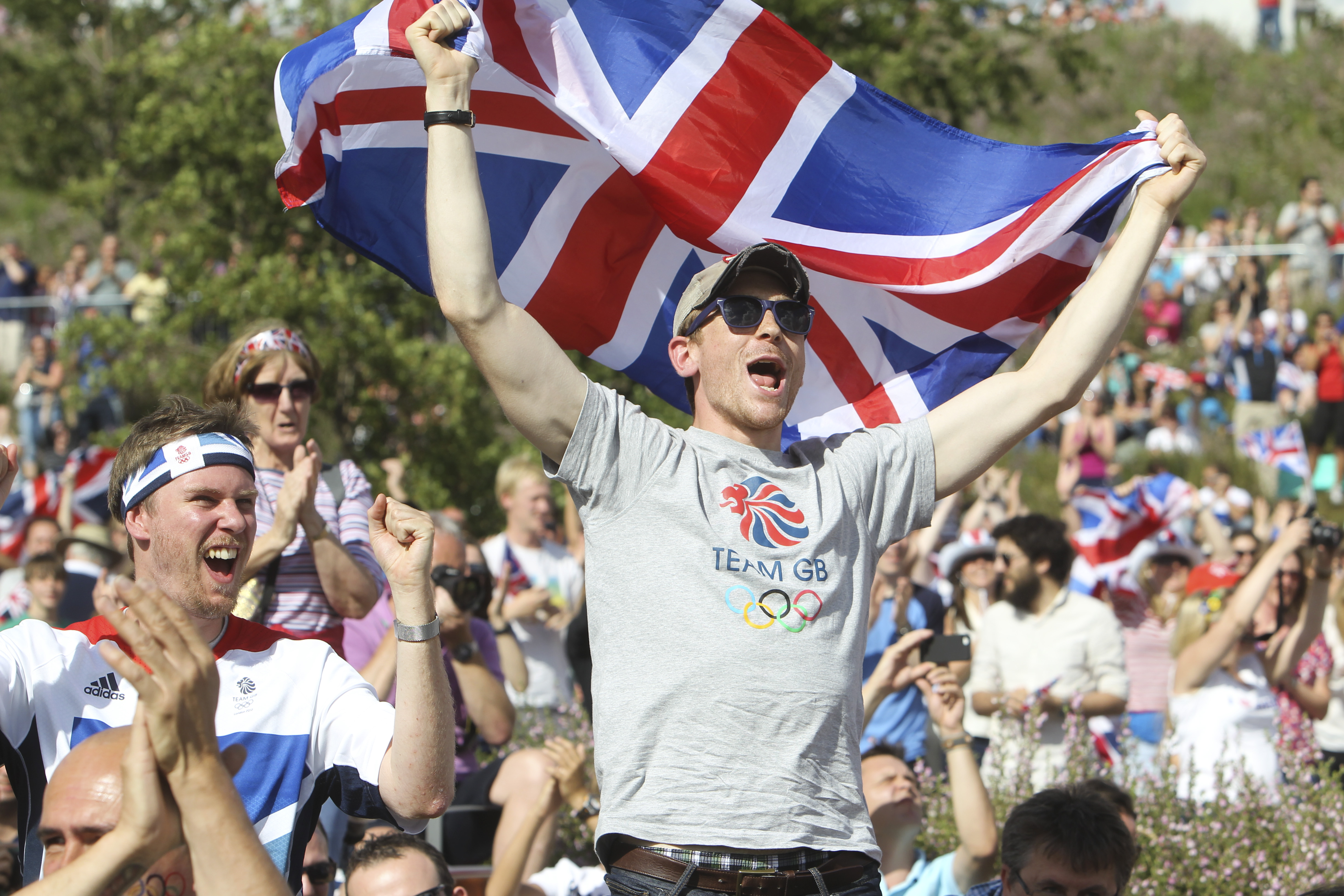
Fans celebrate Andy Murray winning gold, 5 August 2012

Great Britain had only two players that qualified automatically through their world ranking: world number four Andy Murray took part in the men's singles, and also played with his brother Jamie Murray, who had sufficiently high ranking in doubles, in the men's doubles. Ross Hutchins and Colin Fleming have also qualified for the men's doubles.

Great Britain did not have any other players with a sufficiently high world ranking to qualify automatically, and therefore applied for a number of wildcard places in the men's and women's draws. A total of four British players (two each in the women's singles and women's doubles) were given places, allowing Great Britain to take part in all five events (a pair for the mixed doubles will be selected at the Games). On 12 July, the IOC confirmed that withdrawals from the women's doubles event had created a vacancy in that event, and Great Britain's entries in the singles event, Elena Baltacha and Anne Keothavong would team up to enter. On 24 July, Heather Watson, one of Great Britain's other women's doubles pair, was given an entry to the women's singles as a replacement for Alona Bondarenko of Ukraine, who withdrew due to injury. Laura Robson replaced Croatian Petra Martić withdrew due to injury, chosen as an alternate replacement.

=== Men ===
Athlete	Event	Round of 64	Round of 32	Round of 16	Quarterfinals	Semifinals	Final / BM	
Athlete	Event	Opposition Score	Opposition Score	Opposition Score	Opposition Score	Opposition Score	Opposition Score	Rank
Andy Murray	Singles	Wawrinka (SUI); W 6–3, 6–3	Nieminen (FIN); W 6–2, 6–4	Baghdatis (CYP); W 4–6, 6–1, 6–4	Almagro (ESP); W 6–4, 6–1	Djokovic (SRB); W 7–5, 7–5	Federer (SUI); W 6–2, 6–1, 6–4	1st place, gold medalist(s)
Andy Murray; Jamie Murray	Doubles	Not scheduled	Melzer / Peya (AUT); L 7–5, 6–7^{(6–8)}, 5–7	Did not advance				
Ross Hutchins; Colin Fleming	Doubles	Not scheduled	Benneteau / Gasquet (FRA); L 5–7, 3–6	Did not advance				

=== Women ===
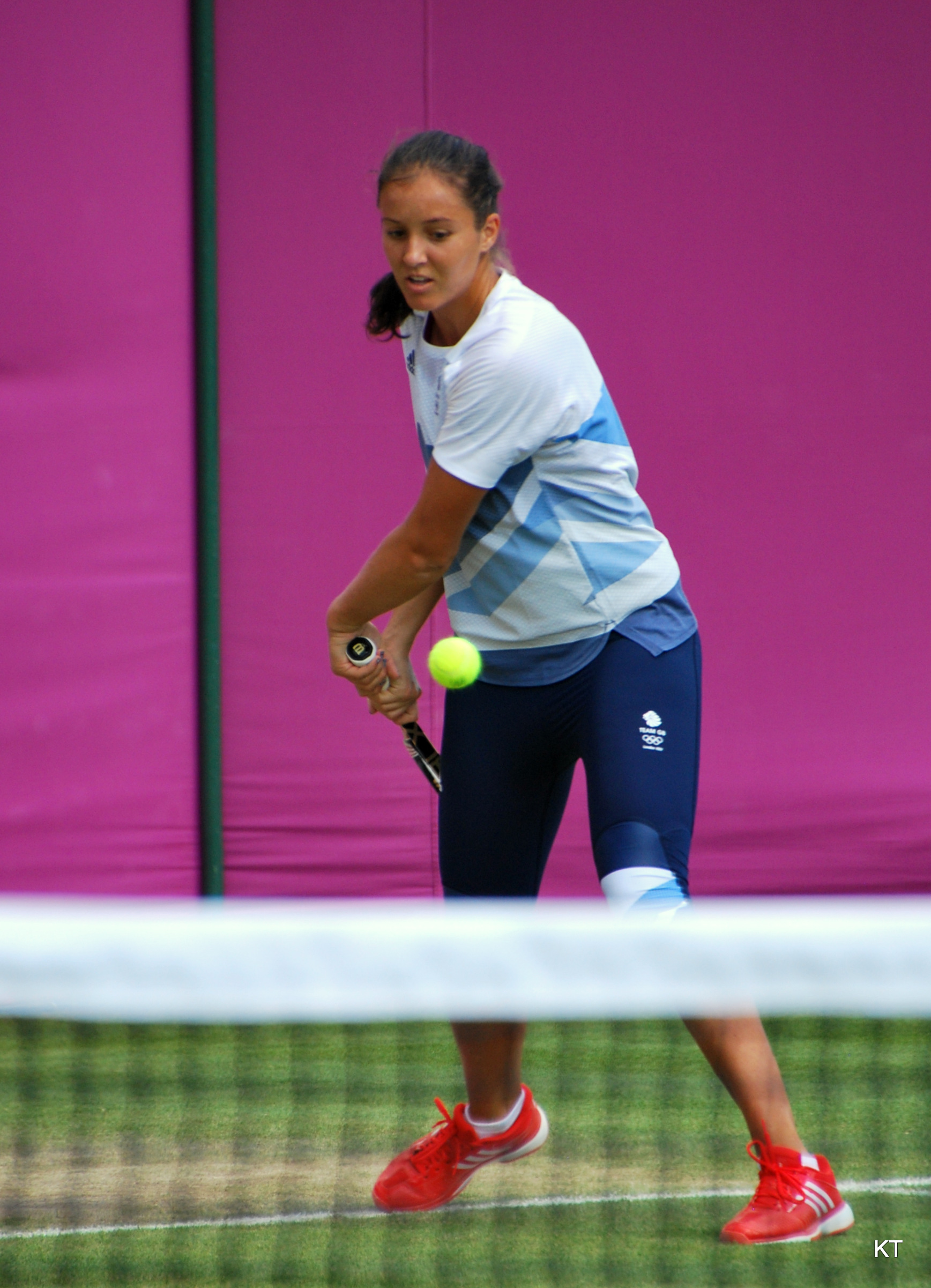
Laura Robson warming up on the Wimbledon practice courts

Athlete	Event	Round of 64	Round of 32	Round of 16	Quarterfinals	Semifinals	Final / BM	
Athlete	Event	Opposition Score	Opposition Score	Opposition Score	Opposition Score	Opposition Score	Opposition Score	Rank
Elena Baltacha	Singles	Szávay (HUN); W 6–3, 6–3	Ivanovic (SRB); L 4–6, 6–7^{(5–7)}	Did not advance				
Anne Keothavong	Singles	Wozniacki (DEN); L 6–4, 3–6, 2–6	Did not advance					
Heather Watson	Singles	Soler Espinosa (ESP); W 6–2, 6–2	Kirilenko (RUS); L 3–6, 2–6	Did not advance				
Laura Robson	Singles	Šafářová (CZE); W 7–6^{(7–4)}, 6–4	Sharapova (RUS); L 6–7^{(5–7)}, 3–6	Did not advance				
Elena Baltacha; Anne Keothavong	Doubles	Not scheduled	Görges / Grönefeld (GER); L 3–6, 1–6	Did not advance				
Laura Robson; Heather Watson	Doubles	Not scheduled	Kerber / Lisicki (GER); L 6–1, 4–6, 3–6	Did not advance				

=== Mixed ===
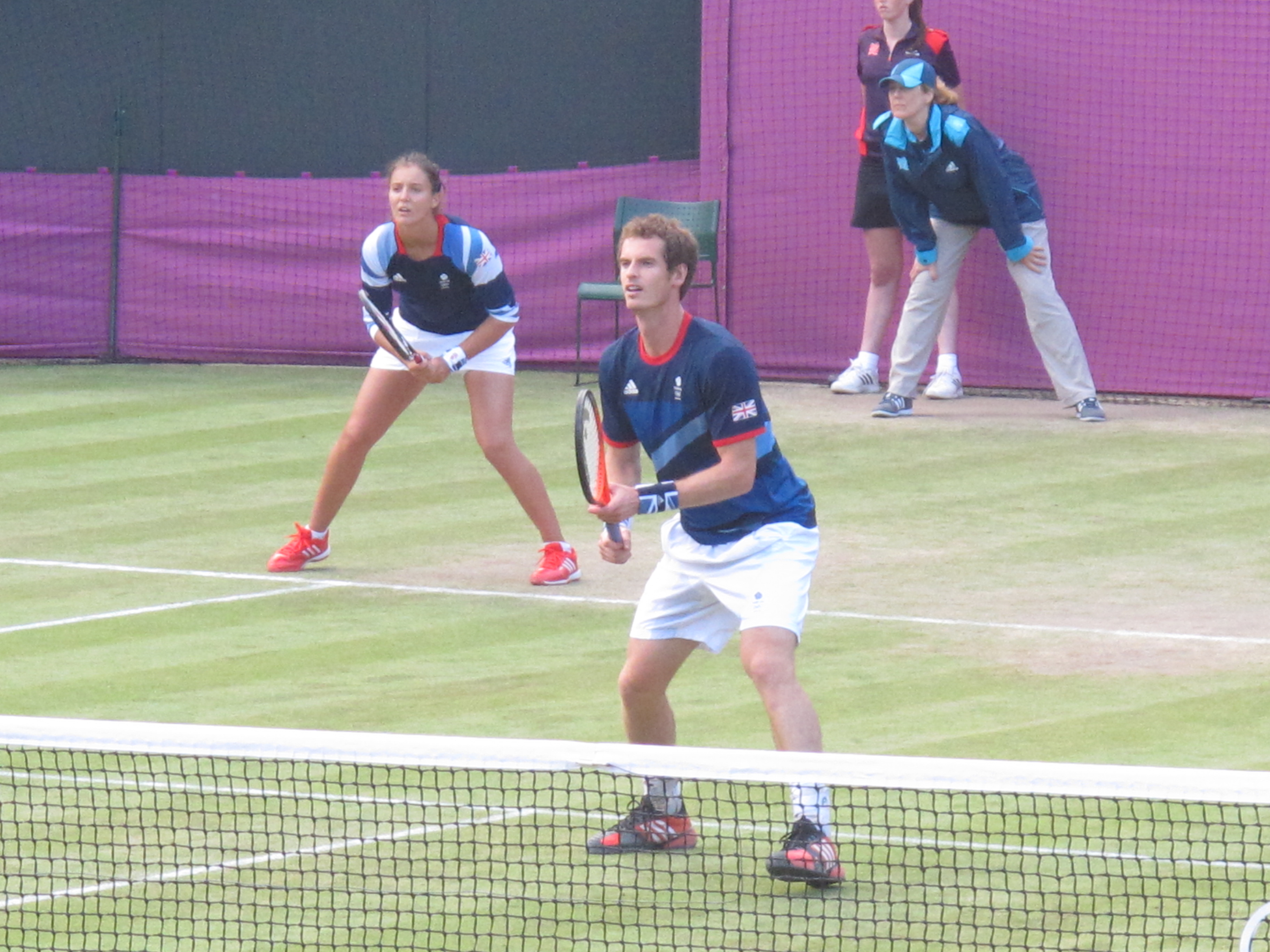
Robson and Murray in the mixed doubles

Athlete	Event	Round of 16	Quarterfinals	Semifinals	Final / BM	
Athlete	Event	Opposition Score	Opposition Score	Opposition Score	Opposition Score	Rank
Andy Murray; Laura Robson	Doubles	Štěpánek / Hradecká (CZE); W 7–5, 6–7^{(7–9)}, [10–7]	Stosur / Hewitt (AUS); W 6–3, 3–6, [10–8]	Lisicki / Kas (GER); W 6–1, 6–7^{(7–9)}, [10–7]	Azarenka / Mirnyi (BLR); L 6–2, 3–6, [8–10]	2nd place, silver medalist(s)

== Triathlon ==
Helen Jenkins became the second Briton to qualify for the Olympics, when she won the Dextro Energy Triathlon – ITU World Championship Series 2011 London event, meeting the British qualifying standards of finishing on the podium at the race over the Olympic course. The next day Alistair Brownlee and his brother Jonathan Brownlee became the third and fourth people to qualify for London, as Alistair won the race and Jonny came in third over the Olympic course.

Athlete	Event	Swim (1.5 km)	Trans 1	Bike (40 km)	Trans 2	Run (10 km)	Total time	Rank
Alistair Brownlee	Men's	17:04	0:39	59:08	0:27	29:07	1:46:25	1st place, gold medalist(s)
Jonathan Brownlee	Men's	17:02	0:38	59:11	0:28	29:37	1:46:56	3rd place, bronze medalist(s)
Stuart Hayes	Men's	17:17	0:39	59:04	0:35	33:29	1:51:04	37
Lucy Hall	Women's	18:17	0:43	1:06:39	0:35	38.24	2:04:38	33
Vicky Holland	Women's	19:22	0:41	1:07:23	0:31	34:58	2:02:55	26
Helen Jenkins	Women's	19:19	0:43	1:05:35	0:32	34:10	2:00:19	5

== Volleyball ==
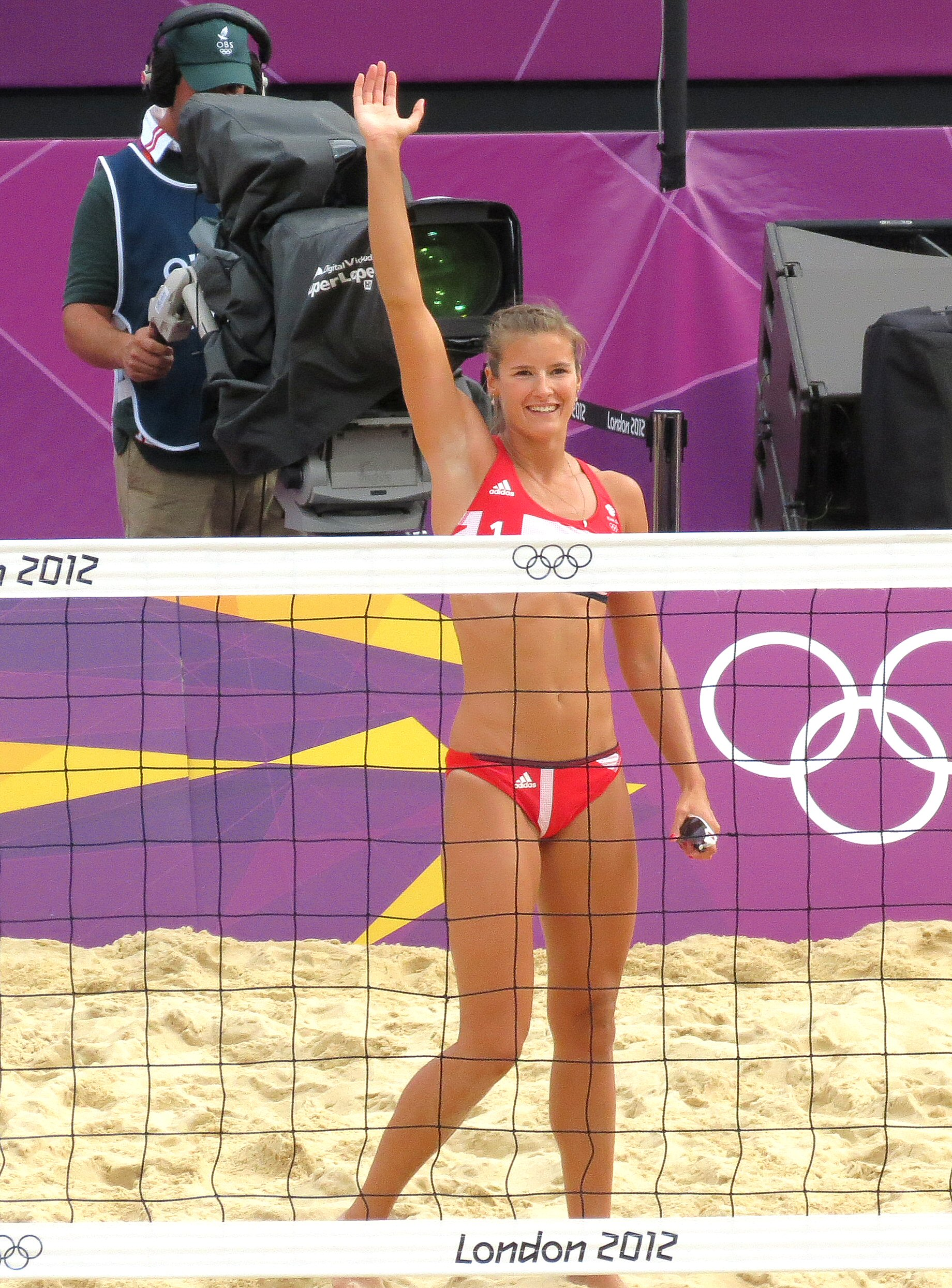
Zara Dampney competing in the women's beach volleyball

As hosts, Great Britain gained automatic entry for men's and women's teams in both indoor and beach volleyball.

=== Beach ===
Athlete	Event	Preliminary round	Standing	Round of 16	Quarterfinals	Semifinals	Final	
Athlete	Event	Opposition Score	Standing	Opposition Score	Opposition Score	Opposition Score	Opposition Score	Rank
John Garcia Thompson; Steve Grotowski	Men's	Pool F Binstock – Reader (CAN); L 0 – 2 (19–21, 13–21); Cunha – Santos (BRA); L 0 – 2 (17–21, 12–21); Skarlund – Spinnangr (NOR); L 0 – 2 (20–22, 13–21)	4	Did not advance				19
Zara Dampney; Shauna Mullin	Women's	Pool F Lessard – Martin (CAN); W 2 – 1 (17–21, 21–14, 15–13); Cicolari – Menegatti (ITA); L 0 – 2 (18–21, 12–21); Khomyakova – Ukolova (RUS); L 0 – 2 (23–25, 13–21); Lucky Losers; D Schwaiger – S Schwaiger (AUT); L 0 – 2 (15–21, 12–21)	3	Did not advance				17

=== Indoor ===
==== Men's tournament ====
===== Squad =====
The following is the British roster in the men's volleyball tournament of the 2012 Summer Olympics.

Head coach: (Netherlands) Harry Brokking

№	Name	Date of birth	Height	Weight	Spike	Block	2012 club
1	Peter Bakare	2 July 1989	1.95 m (6 ft 5 in)	93 kg (205 lb)	359 cm (141 in)	339 cm (133 in)	(Netherlands) Landstede Zwolle
2	Ben Pipes (c)	21 October 1986	2.04 m (6 ft 8 in)	91 kg (201 lb)	337 cm (133 in)	318 cm (125 in)	(Netherlands) Landstede Zwolle
3	Dami Bakare	22 September 1988	1.96 m (6 ft 5 in)	89 kg (196 lb)	363 cm (143 in)	339 cm (133 in)	(Belgium) VC Argex Duvel Puurs
4	Daniel Hunter (L)	23 January 1990	1.80 m (5 ft 11 in)	85 kg (187 lb)	320 cm (130 in)	300 cm (120 in)	(Netherlands) Landstede Zwolle
5	Mark Plotyczer	19 February 1987	1.95 m (6 ft 5 in)	81 kg (179 lb)	344 cm (135 in)	316 cm (124 in)	(France) St-Brieuc CAVB
7	Mark McGivern	24 February 1983	1.95 m (6 ft 5 in)	87 kg (192 lb)	352 cm (139 in)	324 cm (128 in)	(France) Avignon Volley-Ball
8	Jason Haldane	23 July 1971	2.03 m (6 ft 8 in)	105 kg (231 lb)	350 cm (140 in)	330 cm (130 in)	(Bulgaria) VC CSKA Sofia
9	Andrew Pink	25 January 1983	1.92 m (6 ft 4 in)	86 kg (190 lb)	349 cm (137 in)	321 cm (126 in)	(France) Amicale Laïque Canteleu-Maromme
10	Nathan French	20 April 1990	1.93 m (6 ft 4 in)	77 kg (170 lb)	333 cm (131 in)	310 cm (120 in)	(France) Avignon Volley-Ball
11	Joel Miller	15 December 1988	1.91 m (6 ft 3 in)	83 kg (183 lb)	329 cm (130 in)	311 cm (122 in)	(Austria) VBK Klagenfurt
12	Christopher Lamont	7 December 1982	1.99 m (6 ft 6 in)	76 kg (168 lb)	337 cm (133 in)	314 cm (124 in)	(France) ASUL Lyon
17	Kieran O'Malley	12 May 1988	1.88 m (6 ft 2 in)	78 kg (172 lb)	320 cm (130 in)	305 cm (120 in)	(Netherlands) Abiant Lycurgus

===== Group play =====
Pos	Team	Pld	W	L	Pts	SW	SL	SR	SPW	SPL	SPR
1	Bulgaria	5	4	1	12	13	4	3.250	407	390	1.044
2	Poland	5	3	2	9	11	7	1.571	433	374	1.158
3	Argentina	5	3	2	9	10	7	1.429	382	367	1.041
4	Italy	5	3	2	8	10	9	1.111	426	413	1.031
5	Australia	5	2	3	7	8	10	0.800	395	397	0.995
6	Great Britain	5	0	5	0	0	15	0.000	274	376	0.729

29 July 2012; 09:30	Great Britain	0–3	Bulgaria	Earls Court Exhibition Centre, London; Attendance: 14,000; Referees: Wang Ning (CHN), Akihiko Tano (JPN)
29 July 2012; 09:30	(18–25, 20–25, 24–26); Results Statistics			Earls Court Exhibition Centre, London; Attendance: 14,000; Referees: Wang Ning (CHN), Akihiko Tano (JPN)

31 July 2012; 20:00	Great Britain	0–3	Australia	Earls Court Exhibition Centre, London; Attendance: 14,000; Referees: Georgios Karampetsos (GRE), Rogerio Espicalsky (BRA)
31 July 2012; 20:00	(15–25, 18–25, 20–25); Results Statistics			Earls Court Exhibition Centre, London; Attendance: 14,000; Referees: Georgios Karampetsos (GRE), Rogerio Espicalsky (BRA)

2 August 2012; 22:30	Great Britain	0–3	Italy	Earls Court Exhibition Centre, London; Attendance: 11,500; Referees: Rogerio Espicalsky (BRA), Nasr Shaaban (EGY)
2 August 2012; 22:30	(19–25, 16–25, 20–25); Results Statistics			Earls Court Exhibition Centre, London; Attendance: 11,500; Referees: Rogerio Espicalsky (BRA), Nasr Shaaban (EGY)

4 August 2012; 11:30	Great Britain	0–3	Poland	Earls Court Exhibition Centre, London; Attendance: 14,900; Referees: Ibrahim Al-Naama (QAT), Georgios Karampetsos (GRE)
4 August 2012; 11:30	(16–25, 19–25, 18–25); Results Statistics			Earls Court Exhibition Centre, London; Attendance: 14,900; Referees: Ibrahim Al-Naama (QAT), Georgios Karampetsos (GRE)

6 August 2012; 16:45	Great Britain	0–3	Argentina	Earls Court Exhibition Centre, London; Attendance: 13,750; Referees: Denny Cespedes (DOM), Zorica Bjelić (SRB)
6 August 2012; 16:45	(18–25, 18–25, 15–25); Results Statistics			Earls Court Exhibition Centre, London; Attendance: 13,750; Referees: Denny Cespedes (DOM), Zorica Bjelić (SRB)

==== Women's tournament ====
===== Squad =====
The following is the British roster in the women's volleyball tournament of the 2012 Summer Olympics.

Head coach: Audrey Cooper

№	Name	Date of birth	Height	Weight	Spike	Block	2012 club
1	Savanah Leaf	24 November 1993	1.83 m (6 ft 0 in)	68 kg (150 lb)	316 cm (124 in)	289 cm (114 in)	(United States) University of Miami
2	Lucy Wicks	20 March 1982	1.73 m (5 ft 8 in)	60 kg (130 lb)	285 cm (112 in)	274 cm (108 in)	(Germany) Alemannia Aachen
4	Rachel Laybourne	23 May 1982	1.78 m (5 ft 10 in)	65 kg (143 lb)	299 cm (118 in)	279 cm (110 in)	(Poland) Silesia Volley Myslowice
6	Jennifer Taylor	16 August 1980	1.79 m (5 ft 10 in)	74 kg (163 lb)	287 cm (113 in)	278 cm (109 in)	(Netherlands) TFM/DOK Dwingeloo
7	Maria Bertelli (L)	6 October 1977	1.71 m (5 ft 7 in)	64 kg (141 lb)	279 cm (110 in)	263 cm (104 in)	(Switzerland) VBC Köniz
8	Rachel Bragg	11 December 1984	1.85 m (6 ft 1 in)	74 kg (163 lb)	300 cm (120 in)	283 cm (111 in)	(Germany) VT Aurubis Hamburg
9	Joanne Morgan	7 October 1983	1.68 m (5 ft 6 in)	62 kg (137 lb)	278 cm (109 in)	271 cm (107 in)	(Netherlands) TFM/DOK Dwingeloo
10	Lynne Beattie (c)	23 December 1985	1.82 m (6 ft 0 in)	64 kg (141 lb)	305 cm (120 in)	287 cm (113 in)	(Spain) CV Las Palmas
12	Elizabeth Reid	21 March 1989	1.80 m (5 ft 11 in)	76 kg (168 lb)	314 cm (124 in)	300 cm (120 in)	(United States) University of Georgia
17	Janine Sandell	7 December 1985	1.80 m (5 ft 11 in)	84 kg (185 lb)	305 cm (120 in)	283 cm (111 in)	(Spain) CV Albacete
18	Grace Carter	10 August 1989	1.83 m (6 ft 0 in)	84 kg (185 lb)	304 cm (120 in)	291 cm (115 in)	(France) Olympic Terville Florange
19	Ciara Michel	2 July 1985	1.95 m (6 ft 5 in)	70 kg (150 lb)	320 cm (130 in)	302 cm (119 in)	(Germany) Alemannia Aachen

===== Group play =====
Pos	Team	Pld	W	L	Pts	SW	SL	SR	SPW	SPL	SPR	Qualification
1	Russia	5	5	0	14	15	4	3.750	459	352	1.304	Quarter-finals
2	Italy	5	4	1	13	14	5	2.800	442	368	1.201	Quarter-finals
3	Japan	5	3	2	9	11	6	1.833	401	335	1.197	Quarter-finals
4	Dominican Republic	5	2	3	6	8	9	0.889	374	362	1.033	Quarter-finals
5	Great Britain	5	1	4	2	3	14	0.214	295	396	0.745	
6	Algeria	5	0	5	1	2	15	0.133	252	410	0.615	

28 July 2012; 14:45	Great Britain	0–3	Russia	Earls Court Exhibition Centre, London; Attendance: 15,000; Referees: Patricia Salvatore (USA), Rogério Espicalski (BRA)
28 July 2012; 14:45	(19–25, 10–25, 16–25) result statistics			Earls Court Exhibition Centre, London; Attendance: 15,000; Referees: Patricia Salvatore (USA), Rogério Espicalski (BRA)

30 July 2012; 22:00	Great Britain	3–2	Algeria	Earls Court Exhibition Centre, London; Attendance: 14,000; Referees: Mitchell Davidson (CAN), Janpen Jirakakul (THA)
30 July 2012; 22:00	(22–25, 25–19, 23–25, 25–19, 15–8) result statistics			Earls Court Exhibition Centre, London; Attendance: 14,000; Referees: Mitchell Davidson (CAN), Janpen Jirakakul (THA)

1 August 2012; 16:45	Great Britain	0–3	Italy	Earls Court Exhibition Centre, London; Attendance: 11,800; Referees: Zorica Bjelić (SRB), Denny Lassi (DOM)
1 August 2012; 16:45	(25–27, 12–25, 12–25) result statistics			Earls Court Exhibition Centre, London; Attendance: 11,800; Referees: Zorica Bjelić (SRB), Denny Lassi (DOM)

3 August 2012; 16:45	Great Britain	0–3	Dominican Republic	Earls Court Exhibition Centre, London; Attendance: 14,000; Referees: Mohamad Shaaban (EGY), Janpen Jirakakul (THA)
3 August 2012; 16:45	(9–25, 18–25, 19–25) result statistics			Earls Court Exhibition Centre, London; Attendance: 14,000; Referees: Mohamad Shaaban (EGY), Janpen Jirakakul (THA)

5 August 2012; 14:45	Great Britain	0–3	Japan	Earls Court Exhibition Centre, London; Attendance: 14,000; Referees: Michael Davidson (CAN), Mohamed Shaaban (EGY)
5 August 2012; 14:45	(19–25, 14–25, 12–25) result statistics			Earls Court Exhibition Centre, London; Attendance: 14,000; Referees: Michael Davidson (CAN), Mohamed Shaaban (EGY)

== Water polo ==
As hosts, Great Britain gained automatic entry for both men's and women's teams.

=== Men's tournament ===
==== Team roster ====
The following is the British roster in the men's water polo tournament of the 2012 Summer Olympics.

№	Name	Pos.	Height	Weight	Date of birth	2012 club
1	Edward Scott	GK	1.97 m (6 ft 6 in)	85 kg (187 lb)	28 May 1988	(Spain) CE Mediterrani
2	Ciaran James	D	1.93 m (6 ft 4 in)	93 kg (205 lb)	5 July 1991	(Germany) SV Cannstatt
3	Glen Robinson	D	1.88 m (6 ft 2 in)	90 kg (198 lb)	26 January 1989	(Germany) SV Wurzburg 05
4	Sean King	D	1.93 m (6 ft 4 in)	91 kg (201 lb)	3 May 1989	(Germany) SV Weiden
5	Craig Figes	D	1.83 m (6 ft 0 in)	90 kg (198 lb)	14 August 1978	(Italy) Pescara
6	Jack Waller	CF	1.87 m (6 ft 2 in)	95 kg (209 lb)	6 October 1989	(Spain) CN Sant Andreu
7	Alexander Parsonage	D	1.80 m (5 ft 11 in)	87 kg (192 lb)	30 April 1985	(Netherlands) UZSC
8	Jake Vincent	CB	1.97 m (6 ft 6 in)	98 kg (216 lb)	24 June 1989	(Germany) SV Bayer Uerdingen
9	Robert Parker	CB	2.00 m (6 ft 7 in)	100 kg (220 lb)	4 December 1987	(Spain) CN Terrassa
10	Adam Scholefield	CF	1.89 m (6 ft 2 in)	99 kg (218 lb)	24 May 1985	(Hungary) PVSK
11	Sean Ryder	D	1.88 m (6 ft 2 in)	94 kg (207 lb)	18 June 1987	(Germany) SV Weiden
12	Joseph O’Regan	CB	2.03 m (6 ft 8 in)	104 kg (229 lb)	22 June 1991	(Hungary) PVSK
13	Matthew Holland	GK	1.94 m (6 ft 4 in)	96 kg (212 lb)	22 June 1989	(France) Aix-en-Provence

Head coach: Cristian Iordache

==== Group play ====
Team	Pld	W	D	L	GF	GA	GD	Pts	Qualification
Serbia	5	4	1	0	69	38	+31	9	Quarterfinals
Montenegro	5	3	1	1	54	41	+13	7	Quarterfinals
Hungary	5	3	0	2	65	52	+13	6	Quarterfinals
United States	5	3	0	2	43	44	−1	6	Quarterfinals
Romania	5	1	0	4	48	55	−7	2	
Great Britain	5	0	0	5	28	77	−49	0	

29 July 2012; 18:20	Report	Romania	13–4	Great Britain	Water Polo Arena, London; Referees: German Moller (ARG), Anton Bervoets (NED)
29 July 2012; 18:20	Report	Score by quarters: 2–1, 4–0, 3–2, 4–1			Water Polo Arena, London; Referees: German Moller (ARG), Anton Bervoets (NED)
29 July 2012; 18:20	Report	Diaconu 4	Goals	Parker 2	Water Polo Arena, London; Referees: German Moller (ARG), Anton Bervoets (NED)

31 July 2012; 18:20	Report	Serbia	21–7	Great Britain	Water Polo Arena, London; Referees: Gus Pinker (RSA), Kazuhiko Makita (JPN)
31 July 2012; 18:20	Report	Score by quarters: 3–3, 7–2, 6–1, 5–1			Water Polo Arena, London; Referees: Gus Pinker (RSA), Kazuhiko Makita (JPN)
31 July 2012; 18:20	Report	Prlainović 5	Goals	Figes 3	Water Polo Arena, London; Referees: Gus Pinker (RSA), Kazuhiko Makita (JPN)

2 August 2012; 18:20	Report	Great Britain	7–13	United States	Water Polo Arena, London; Referees: Cory Williams (NZL), Ni Shiwei (CHN)
2 August 2012; 18:20	Report	Score by quarters: 0–5, 3–3, 3–2, 1–3			Water Polo Arena, London; Referees: Cory Williams (NZL), Ni Shiwei (CHN)
2 August 2012; 18:20	Report	Parker 3	Goals	Azevedo 4	Water Polo Arena, London; Referees: Cory Williams (NZL), Ni Shiwei (CHN)

4 August 2012; 18:20	Report	Hungary	17–6	Great Britain	Water Polo Arena, London; Referees: German Moller (ARG), Denis Danelon (BRA)
4 August 2012; 18:20	Report	Score by quarters: 6–1, 5–4, 4–0, 2–1			Water Polo Arena, London; Referees: German Moller (ARG), Denis Danelon (BRA)
4 August 2012; 18:20	Report	Kásás, Madaras 3	Goals	six players 1	Water Polo Arena, London; Referees: German Moller (ARG), Denis Danelon (BRA)

6 August 2012; 18:20	Report	Great Britain	4–13	Montenegro	Water Polo Arena, London; Referees: Ni Shiwei (CHN), Kazuhiko Makita (JPN)
6 August 2012; 18:20	Report	Score by quarters: 1–4, 2–4, 1–2, 0–3			Water Polo Arena, London; Referees: Ni Shiwei (CHN), Kazuhiko Makita (JPN)
6 August 2012; 18:20	Report	four players 1	Goals	Zloković 3	Water Polo Arena, London; Referees: Ni Shiwei (CHN), Kazuhiko Makita (JPN)

=== Women's tournament ===
==== Team roster ====
The following is the British roster in the women's water polo tournament of the 2012 Summer Olympics..

№	Name	Pos.	Height	Weight	Date of birth	2012 club
1	Robyn Nicholls	GK	1.78 m (5 ft 10 in)	65 kg (143 lb)	8 May 1990	(United Kingdom) City of Manchester
2	Chloe Wilcox	D	1.72 m (5 ft 8 in)	62 kg (137 lb)	20 December 1986	(United Kingdom) City of Manchester
3	Fiona McCann	CB	1.72 m (5 ft 8 in)	70 kg (154 lb)	13 May 1987	(United Kingdom) City of Liverpool
4	Francesca Snell	CB	1.75 m (5 ft 9 in)	63 kg (139 lb)	28 March 1987	(United Kingdom) West London Penguin
5	Alexandra Rutlidge	CB	1.70 m (5 ft 7 in)	62 kg (137 lb)	12 November 1988	(United Kingdom) City of Manchester
6	Frances Leighton	CF	1.82 m (6 ft 0 in)	72 kg (159 lb)	30 March 1982	(United Kingdom) City of Sheffield
7	Lisa Gibson	CF	1.77 m (5 ft 10 in)	75 kg (165 lb)	12 August 1989	(United Kingdom) City of Manchester
8	Hazel Musgrove	CB	1.70 m (5 ft 7 in)	65 kg (143 lb)	6 February 1989	(United Kingdom) City of Liverpool
9	Ciara Gibson-Byrne	D	1.67 m (5 ft 6 in)	59 kg (130 lb)	3 December 1992	(United Kingdom) City of Manchester
10	Angela Winstanley-Smith	CF	1.79 m (5 ft 10 in)	66 kg (146 lb)	5 August 1985	(United Kingdom) City of Manchester
11	Francesca Clayton	D	1.70 m (5 ft 7 in)	69 kg (152 lb)	7 January 1990	(United Kingdom) City of Liverpool
12	Rebecca Kershaw	D	1.75 m (5 ft 9 in)	59 kg (130 lb)	11 August 1990	(United Kingdom) City of Manchester
13	Rosemary Morris	GK	1.80 m (5 ft 11 in)	69 kg (152 lb)	31 January 1986	(United Kingdom) City of Liverpool

Head coach: Szilveszter Fekete

==== Group play ====
Team	Pld	W	D	L	GF	GA	GD	Pts
Australia	3	3	0	0	37	19	+18	6
Russia	3	2	0	1	22	21	+1	4
Italy	3	1	0	2	22	22	0	2
Great Britain	3	0	0	3	14	33	−19	0

30 July 2012; 18:20	Report	Great Britain	6–7	Russia	Water Polo Arena, London; Referees: Marie Deslieres (CAN), Ni Shiwei (CHN)
30 July 2012; 18:20	Report	Score by quarters: 2–3, 3–2, 0–1, 1–1			Water Polo Arena, London; Referees: Marie Deslieres (CAN), Ni Shiwei (CHN)
30 July 2012; 18:20	Report	Winstanley-Smith 3	Goals	Beliaeva, Prokofyeva 2	Water Polo Arena, London; Referees: Marie Deslieres (CAN), Ni Shiwei (CHN)

1 August 2012; 19:40	Report	Great Britain	3–16	Australia	Water Polo Arena, London; Referees: Gus Pinker (RSA), Denis Danelon (BRA)
1 August 2012; 19:40	Report	Score by quarters: 1–3, 1–3, 1–5, 0–5			Water Polo Arena, London; Referees: Gus Pinker (RSA), Denis Danelon (BRA)
1 August 2012; 19:40	Report	Wilcox 2	Goals	Webster 5	Water Polo Arena, London; Referees: Gus Pinker (RSA), Denis Danelon (BRA)

3 August 2012; 18:20	Report	Great Britain	5–10	Italy	Water Polo Arena, London; Referees: German Moller (ARG), Kazuhiko Makita (JPN)
3 August 2012; 18:20	Report	Score by quarters: 2–4, 1–2, 1–2, 1–2			Water Polo Arena, London; Referees: German Moller (ARG), Kazuhiko Makita (JPN)
3 August 2012; 18:20	Report	Gibson-Byrne 2	Goals	Emmolo, Di Mario 3	Water Polo Arena, London; Referees: German Moller (ARG), Kazuhiko Makita (JPN)

===== Quarter-final =====
5 August 2012; 20:20	Report	Spain	9–7	Great Britain	Water Polo Arena, London; Referees: Cory Williams (NZL), Gus Pinker (RSA)
5 August 2012; 20:20	Report	Score by quarters: 3–2, 3–0, 2–3, 1–2			Water Polo Arena, London; Referees: Cory Williams (NZL), Gus Pinker (RSA)
5 August 2012; 20:20	Report	Miranda, Espar 2	Goals	Painter-Snell 3	Water Polo Arena, London; Referees: Cory Williams (NZL), Gus Pinker (RSA)

===== Semi-final 5–8 =====
7 August 2012; 18:20	Report	Russia	11–9	Great Britain	Water Polo Arena, London; Referees: Denis Danelon (BRA), German Moller (ARG)
7 August 2012; 18:20	Report	Score by quarters: 3–3, 1–2, 4–2, 3–2			Water Polo Arena, London; Referees: Denis Danelon (BRA), German Moller (ARG)
7 August 2012; 18:20	Report	Prokofyeva 4	Goals	Wilcox, Painter-Snell 3	Water Polo Arena, London; Referees: Denis Danelon (BRA), German Moller (ARG)

===== Classification 7–8 =====
9 August 2012; 14:30	Report	Italy	11–7	Great Britain	Water Polo Arena, London; Referees: Daniel Flahive (AUS), Gyorgy Juhasz (HUN)
9 August 2012; 14:30	Report	Score by quarters: 2–3, 4–0, 3–2, 2–2			Water Polo Arena, London; Referees: Daniel Flahive (AUS), Gyorgy Juhasz (HUN)
9 August 2012; 14:30	Report	Di Mario 4	Goals	McCann, Clayton 2	Water Polo Arena, London; Referees: Daniel Flahive (AUS), Gyorgy Juhasz (HUN)

== Weightlifting ==
As the hosts, British weightlifters have already received three men's quota places and two women's places for the London Olympics. The GB team must allocate these places to individual athletes by 10 June 2012.

Athlete	Event	Snatch		Clean & jerk		Total	Rank
Athlete	Event	Result	Rank	Result	Rank	Total	Rank
Gareth Evans	Men's −69 kg	130	=17	158	17	288	14*
Jack Oliver	Men's −77 kg	140	11	170	10	310	10
Peter Kirkbride	Men's −94 kg	138	20	190	15	328	8*
Zoe Smith	Women's −58 kg	90	15	121	11	211	10*
Natasha Perdue	Women's −69 kg	92	13	113	12	205	8*

- Following disqualifications as a result of retested samples.

== Wrestling ==
Great Britain were originally offered three guaranteed places at the Games as host nation. If any wrestlers qualify directly through the qualification process, these places were to be reduced.

On 29 May 2012, the BOA announced that British Wrestling had failed to meet the agreed criteria for the three quota places, and therefore only one quota place would be awarded. Ukrainian-born Olga Butkevych was selected in the women's 55 kg category.

VT
Victory by fall.
PP
Decision by points – the loser with technical points.
PO
Decision by points – the loser without technical points.

=== Women's freestyle ===
Athlete	Event	Qualification	Round of 16	Quarterfinal	Semifinal	Repechage 1	Repechage 2	Final / BM	
Athlete	Event	Opposition Result	Opposition Result	Opposition Result	Opposition Result	Opposition Result	Opposition Result	Opposition Result	Rank
Olga Butkevych	−55 kg	Bye	Antes (ECU); L 1–3 ^{PP}	Did not advance					11

== Media coverage ==
The BBC paid £40–50 million for the broadcast rights to the 2012 Olympic Games and showed around 5,800 hours of content over the 17 days of the Games, all of which was available in high definition. This is an increase on the amount of coverage shown at the 2008 Summer Olympics in Beijing when half of the international feed, 2,500 hours, was broadcast. To accompany its coverage the BBC commissioned an anthem from the British band, Elbow, entitled "First Steps".

== Victory parade ==
A celebratory parade took place in central London on 10 September 2012 to commemorate the Olympic and Paralympic Games.

== See also ==
- Great Britain at the 2012 Summer Paralympics
