= Volleyball at the 2012 Summer Olympics – Men's team rosters =

This article shows the rosters of all participating teams at the men's indoor volleyball tournament at the 2012 Summer Olympics in London.

== Pool A ==
=== Great Britain ===
The following is the British roster in the men's volleyball tournament of the 2012 Summer Olympics.

Head coach: (Netherlands) Harry Brokking

№	Name	Date of birth	Height	Weight	Spike	Block	2012 club
1	Peter Bakare	2 July 1989	1.95 m (6 ft 5 in)	93 kg (205 lb)	359 cm (141 in)	339 cm (133 in)	(Netherlands) Landstede Zwolle
2	Ben Pipes (c)	21 October 1986	2.04 m (6 ft 8 in)	91 kg (201 lb)	337 cm (133 in)	318 cm (125 in)	(Netherlands) Landstede Zwolle
3	Dami Bakare	22 September 1988	1.96 m (6 ft 5 in)	89 kg (196 lb)	363 cm (143 in)	339 cm (133 in)	(Belgium) VC Argex Duvel Puurs
4	Daniel Hunter (L)	23 January 1990	1.80 m (5 ft 11 in)	85 kg (187 lb)	320 cm (130 in)	300 cm (120 in)	(Netherlands) Landstede Zwolle
5	Mark Plotyczer	19 February 1987	1.95 m (6 ft 5 in)	81 kg (179 lb)	344 cm (135 in)	316 cm (124 in)	(France) St-Brieuc CAVB
7	Mark McGivern	24 February 1983	1.95 m (6 ft 5 in)	87 kg (192 lb)	352 cm (139 in)	324 cm (128 in)	(France) Avignon Volley-Ball
8	Jason Haldane	23 July 1971	2.03 m (6 ft 8 in)	105 kg (231 lb)	350 cm (140 in)	330 cm (130 in)	(Bulgaria) VC CSKA Sofia
9	Andrew Pink	25 January 1983	1.92 m (6 ft 4 in)	86 kg (190 lb)	349 cm (137 in)	321 cm (126 in)	(France) Amicale Laïque Canteleu-Maromme
10	Nathan French	20 April 1990	1.93 m (6 ft 4 in)	77 kg (170 lb)	333 cm (131 in)	310 cm (120 in)	(France) Avignon Volley-Ball
11	Joel Miller	15 December 1988	1.91 m (6 ft 3 in)	83 kg (183 lb)	329 cm (130 in)	311 cm (122 in)	(Austria) VBK Klagenfurt
12	Christopher Lamont	7 December 1982	1.99 m (6 ft 6 in)	76 kg (168 lb)	337 cm (133 in)	314 cm (124 in)	(France) ASUL Lyon
17	Kieran O'Malley	12 May 1988	1.88 m (6 ft 2 in)	78 kg (172 lb)	320 cm (130 in)	305 cm (120 in)	(Netherlands) Abiant Lycurgus

=== Italy ===
The following is the Italian roster in the men's volleyball tournament of the 2012 Summer Olympics.

Head coach: Mauro Berruto

№	Name	Date of birth	Height	Weight	Spike	Block	2012 club
1	Luigi Mastrangelo	17 August 1975	2.02 m (6 ft 8 in)	90 kg (200 lb)	368 cm (145 in)	336 cm (132 in)	(Italy) Bre Banca Lannutti Cuneo
3	Simone Parodi	16 June 1986	1.96 m (6 ft 5 in)	82 kg (181 lb)	350 cm (140 in)	335 cm (132 in)	(Italy) Lube Banca Marche Macerata
6	Samuele Papi	20 May 1973	1.90 m (6 ft 3 in)	84 kg (185 lb)	345 cm (136 in)	310 cm (120 in)	(Italy) Copra Elior Piacenza
7	Michal Lasko	11 March 1981	2.02 m (6 ft 8 in)	104 kg (229 lb)	348 cm (137 in)	337 cm (133 in)	(Poland) Jastrzębski Węgiel
9	Ivan Zaytsev	2 October 1988	2.02 m (6 ft 8 in)	92 kg (203 lb)	355 cm (140 in)	348 cm (137 in)	(Italy) Lube Banca Marche Macerata
10	Dante Boninfante	7 March 1977	1.88 m (6 ft 2 in)	85 kg (187 lb)	334 cm (131 in)	315 cm (124 in)	(Italy) M. Roma Volley
11	Cristian Savani (c)	22 February 1982	1.95 m (6 ft 5 in)	95 kg (209 lb)	354 cm (139 in)	335 cm (132 in)	(Italy) Lube Banca Marche Macerata
13	Dragan Travica	28 August 1986	2.00 m (6 ft 7 in)	94 kg (207 lb)	335 cm (132 in)	320 cm (130 in)	(Italy) Lube Banca Marche Macerata
14	Alessandro Fei	29 November 1978	2.04 m (6 ft 8 in)	90 kg (200 lb)	358 cm (141 in)	336 cm (132 in)	(Italy) Copra Elior Piacenza
15	Emanuele Birarelli	8 February 1981	2.01 m (6 ft 7 in)	98 kg (216 lb)	345 cm (136 in)	316 cm (124 in)	(Italy) Trentino Diatec
16	Andrea Bari (L)	5 March 1980	1.84 m (6 ft 0 in)	80 kg (180 lb)	327 cm (129 in)	310 cm (120 in)	(Italy) Trentino Diatec
17	Andrea Giovi (L)	19 August 1983	1.83 m (6 ft 0 in)	80 kg (180 lb)	310 cm (120 in)	290 cm (110 in)	(Italy) Sir Safety Perugia

=== Poland ===
The following is the Polish roster in the men's volleyball tournament of the 2012 Summer Olympics.

Head coach: (Italy) Andrea Anastasi

№	Name	Date of birth	Height	Weight	Spike	Block	2012 club
1	Piotr Nowakowski	18 December 1987	2.05 m (6 ft 9 in)	90 kg (200 lb)	355 cm (140 in)	340 cm (130 in)	(Poland) Asseco Resovia
2	Michał Winiarski	28 September 1983	2.00 m (6 ft 7 in)	82 kg (181 lb)	355 cm (140 in)	335 cm (132 in)	(Poland) PGE Skra
4	Grzegorz Kosok	2 March 1983	2.06 m (6 ft 9 in)	92 kg (203 lb)	345 cm (136 in)	325 cm (128 in)	(Poland) Asseco Resovia
5	Paweł Zagumny	18 October 1977	2.00 m (6 ft 7 in)	88 kg (194 lb)	336 cm (132 in)	317 cm (125 in)	(Poland) ZAKSA
6	Bartosz Kurek	29 August 1988	2.05 m (6 ft 9 in)	87 kg (192 lb)	352 cm (139 in)	326 cm (128 in)	(Poland) PGE Skra
7	Jakub Jarosz	10 February 1987	1.95 m (6 ft 5 in)	84 kg (185 lb)	353 cm (139 in)	328 cm (129 in)	(Italy) Top Volley
9	Zbigniew Bartman	4 May 1987	1.98 m (6 ft 6 in)	83 kg (183 lb)	352 cm (139 in)	320 cm (130 in)	(Poland) Jastrzębski Węgiel
13	Michał Kubiak	23 February 1988	1.91 m (6 ft 3 in)	80 kg (180 lb)	328 cm (129 in)	312 cm (123 in)	(Poland) Jastrzębski Węgiel
14	Michał Ruciak	22 August 1983	1.89 m (6 ft 2 in)	75 kg (165 lb)	336 cm (132 in)	305 cm (120 in)	(Poland) ZAKSA
15	Łukasz Żygadło	2 August 1979	2.00 m (6 ft 7 in)	89 kg (196 lb)	337 cm (133 in)	325 cm (128 in)	(Italy) Trentino Volley
16	Krzysztof Ignaczak (L)	15 May 1978	1.88 m (6 ft 2 in)	86 kg (190 lb)	330 cm (130 in)	315 cm (124 in)	(Poland) Asseco Resovia
18	Marcin Możdżonek (c)	9 February 1985	2.11 m (6 ft 11 in)	93 kg (205 lb)	358 cm (141 in)	338 cm (133 in)	(Poland) PGE Skra

=== Argentina ===
The following is the Argentine roster in the men's volleyball tournament of the 2012 Summer Olympics.

Head coach: Javier Weber

№	Name	Date of birth	Height	Weight	Spike	Block	2012 club
1	Gabriel Arroyo	3 March 1977	1.94 m (6 ft 4 in)	95 kg (209 lb)	352 cm (139 in)	327 cm (129 in)	(Argentina) Club Ciudad de Bolívar
2	Ivan Castellani	19 January 1991	1.96 m (6 ft 5 in)	82 kg (181 lb)	336 cm (132 in)	320 cm (130 in)	(Argentina) PSM Voley
5	Nicolás Uriarte	21 March 1990	1.92 m (6 ft 4 in)	82 kg (181 lb)	346 cm (136 in)	326 cm (128 in)	(Argentina) Buenos Aires Unidos
6	Cristian Poglajen	14 July 1989	1.95 m (6 ft 5 in)	93 kg (205 lb)	346 cm (136 in)	320 cm (130 in)	(Argentina) Sarmiento Voley
7	Facundo Conte	25 August 1989	1.98 m (6 ft 6 in)	90 kg (200 lb)	350 cm (140 in)	326 cm (128 in)	(Russia) Dynamo Krasnodar
9	Rodrigo Quiroga (c)	23 March 1987	1.90 m (6 ft 3 in)	87 kg (192 lb)	345 cm (136 in)	321 cm (126 in)	(Brazil) Vivo-Minas
10	Nicolas Bruno	24 February 1989	1.88 m (6 ft 2 in)	84 kg (185 lb)	338 cm (133 in)	308 cm (121 in)	(Argentina) Buenos Aires Unidos
11	Sebastian Solé	12 June 1991	2.02 m (6 ft 8 in)	88 kg (194 lb)	350 cm (140 in)	328 cm (129 in)	(Argentina) Club Ciudad de Bolívar
12	Federico Pereyra	19 June 1988	2.00 m (6 ft 7 in)	99 kg (218 lb)	335 cm (132 in)	325 cm (128 in)	(Argentina) Club La Unión
14	Pablo Crer	12 June 1989	2.05 m (6 ft 9 in)	78 kg (172 lb)	350 cm (140 in)	330 cm (130 in)	(Argentina) Club Ciudad de Bolívar
15	Luciano De Cecco	2 June 1988	1.93 m (6 ft 4 in)	89 kg (196 lb)	333 cm (131 in)	315 cm (124 in)	(Italy) Copra Volley
16	Alexis González (L)	21 July 1981	1.84 m (6 ft 0 in)	83 kg (183 lb)	321 cm (126 in)	300 cm (120 in)	(Argentina) Club Ciudad de Bolívar

=== Bulgaria ===
The following is the Bulgarian roster in the men's volleyball tournament of the 2012 Summer Olympics.

Head coach: Nayden Naydenov

№	Name	Date of birth	Height	Weight	Spike	Block	2012 club
1	Georgi Bratoev	October 21, 1987 (age 38)	2.02 m (6 ft 8 in)	88 kg (194 lb)	335 cm (132 in)	318 cm (125 in)	(Bulgaria) Levski Volley
7	Todor Skrimov	9 January 1990	1.91 m (6 ft 3 in)	82 kg (181 lb)	340 cm (130 in)	310 cm (120 in)	(France) Paris Volley
9	Dobromir Dimitrov	7 July 1991	1.96 m (6 ft 5 in)	81 kg (179 lb)	342 cm (135 in)	322 cm (127 in)	(Bulgaria) Pirin Balkanstroy
10	Valentin Bratoev	21 October 1987	2.01 m (6 ft 7 in)	87 kg (192 lb)	335 cm (132 in)	315 cm (124 in)	(Italy) Argos Volley
11	Vladimir Nikolov (c)	3 October 1977	2.00 m (6 ft 7 in)	95 kg (209 lb)	345 cm (136 in)	325 cm (128 in)	(Italy) Copra Volley
12	Viktor Yosifov	16 October 1985	2.04 m (6 ft 8 in)	95 kg (209 lb)	350 cm (140 in)	330 cm (130 in)	(Italy) Pallavolo Modena
13	Teodor Salparov (L)	16 August 1982	1.85 m (6 ft 1 in)	73 kg (161 lb)	320 cm (130 in)	305 cm (120 in)	(Bulgaria) VC CSKA Sofia
14	Teodor Todorov	1 September 1989	2.08 m (6 ft 10 in)	94 kg (207 lb)	365 cm (144 in)	345 cm (136 in)	(Russia) Gazprom-Yugra Surgut
15	Todor Aleksiev	21 April 1983	2.00 m (6 ft 7 in)	96 kg (212 lb)	347 cm (137 in)	327 cm (129 in)	(Russia) Gazprom-Yugra Surgut
17	Nikolay Penchev	22 August 1992	1.96 m (6 ft 5 in)	85 kg (187 lb)	335 cm (132 in)	320 cm (130 in)	(Italy) Copra Volley
18	Nikolay Nikolov	29 July 1986	2.06 m (6 ft 9 in)	97 kg (214 lb)	350 cm (140 in)	332 cm (131 in)	(Italy) Tonno Callipo Vibo Valentia
19	Tsvetan Sokolov	31 December 1989	2.06 m (6 ft 9 in)	108 kg (238 lb)	362 cm (143 in)	319 cm (126 in)	(Italy) Itas Diatec Trentino

=== Australia ===
The following is the Australian roster in the men's volleyball tournament of the 2012 Summer Olympics.

Head coach: (Argentina) Jon Uriarte

№	Name	Date of birth	Height	Weight	Spike	Block	2012 club
1	Aidan Zingel	19 November 1990	2.07 m (6 ft 9 in)	100 kg (220 lb)	361 cm (142 in)	346 cm (136 in)	(Italy) Blu Volley Verona
3	Nathan Roberts	17 February 1986	1.99 m (6 ft 6 in)	90 kg (200 lb)	342 cm (135 in)	328 cm (129 in)	(Italy) CMC Ravenna
5	Travis Passier	26 April 1989	2.05 m (6 ft 9 in)	99 kg (218 lb)	351 cm (138 in)	340 cm (130 in)	(Italy) M. Roma Volley
6	Igor Yudin (c)	17 June 1987	2.00 m (6 ft 7 in)	85 kg (187 lb)	362 cm (143 in)	352 cm (139 in)	(Russia) Yaroslavich Yaroslavl
7	Harrison Peacock	31 January 1991	1.92 m (6 ft 4 in)	87 kg (192 lb)	337 cm (133 in)	353 cm (139 in)	(Sweden) Linköpings VC
8	Andrew Grant	22 April 1985	2.06 m (6 ft 9 in)	93 kg (205 lb)	345 cm (136 in)	328 cm (129 in)	(Australia) Australian Institute of Sport
9	Adam White	8 November 1989	2.03 m (6 ft 8 in)	89 kg (196 lb)	351 cm (138 in)	336 cm (132 in)	(Netherlands) Langhenkel Volley
12	Aden Tutton (L)	6 February 1984	1.82 m (6 ft 0 in)	81 kg (179 lb)	333 cm (131 in)	315 cm (124 in)	(Netherlands) Langhenkel Volley
14	Greg Sukochev	18 February 1988	1.96 m (6 ft 5 in)	86 kg (190 lb)	337 cm (133 in)	324 cm (128 in)	(Slovakia) VK Chemes Humenné
16	Luke Smith	30 August 1990	2.04 m (6 ft 8 in)	95 kg (209 lb)	360 cm (140 in)	342 cm (135 in)	(Sweden) Linköpings VC
18	Lincoln Williams	6 October 1993	2.00 m (6 ft 7 in)	104 kg (229 lb)	353 cm (139 in)	330 cm (130 in)	(Australia) Australian Institute of Sport
19	Thomas Edgar	21 June 1989	2.12 m (6 ft 11 in)	106 kg (234 lb)	357 cm (141 in)	341 cm (134 in)	(Italy) Caffe Aiello Corigliano

== Pool B ==
=== Brazil ===
The following is the Brazilian roster in the men's volleyball tournament of the 2012 Summer Olympics.

Head coach: Bernardo Rezende

No.	Name	Date of birth	Height	Weight	Spike	Block	2012 club
1	Bruno Rezende	2 July 1986	1.90 m (6 ft 3 in)	76 kg (168 lb)	323 cm (127 in)	302 cm (119 in)	(Brazil) RJX
4	Wallace de Souza	26 June 1987	1.98 m (6 ft 6 in)	103 kg (227 lb)	344 cm (135 in)	318 cm (125 in)	(Brazil) Sada Cruzeiro
5	Sidnei Santos	9 July 1982	2.03 m (6 ft 8 in)	98 kg (216 lb)	344 cm (135 in)	318 cm (125 in)	(Brazil) SESI São Paulo
6	Leandro Vissotto Neves	30 April 1983	2.12 m (6 ft 11 in)	97 kg (214 lb)	370 cm (150 in)	345 cm (136 in)	(Italy) Bre Banca Lannutti Cuneo
7	Gilberto Godoy Filho (c)	23 December 1976	1.92 m (6 ft 4 in)	85 kg (187 lb)	325 cm (128 in)	312 cm (123 in)	(Brazil) Cimed/Sky
8	Murilo Endres	3 May 1981	1.90 m (6 ft 3 in)	76 kg (168 lb)	343 cm (135 in)	319 cm (126 in)	(Brazil) SESI São Paulo
10	Sérgio Santos (L)	15 October 1975	1.84 m (6 ft 0 in)	78 kg (172 lb)	325 cm (128 in)	310 cm (120 in)	(Brazil) SESI São Paulo
11	Thiago Alves	26 July 1986	1.94 m (6 ft 4 in)	88 kg (194 lb)	330 cm (130 in)	308 cm (121 in)	(Brazil) RJX
14	Rodrigo Santana	17 April 1979	2.05 m (6 ft 9 in)	85 kg (187 lb)	350 cm (140 in)	328 cm (129 in)	(Brazil) SESI São Paulo
16	Lucas Saatkamp	6 March 1986	2.09 m (6 ft 10 in)	101 kg (223 lb)	340 cm (130 in)	321 cm (126 in)	(Brazil) RJX
17	Ricardo Garcia	17 November 1975	1.91 m (6 ft 3 in)	89 kg (196 lb)	337 cm (133 in)	320 cm (130 in)	(Brazil) Vôlei Futuro
18	Dante Amaral	30 September 1980	2.01 m (6 ft 7 in)	86 kg (190 lb)	345 cm (136 in)	327 cm (129 in)	(Brazil) RJX

=== Russia ===
The following is the Russian roster in the men's volleyball tournament of the 2012 Summer Olympics.

Head coach: Vladimir Alekno

№	Name	Date of birth	Height	Weight	Spike	Block	2012 club
3	Nikolay Apalikov	26 August 1982	2.03 m (6 ft 8 in)	105 kg (231 lb)	353 cm (139 in)	344 cm (135 in)	(Russia) ZENIT Kazan
4	Taras Khtey (c)	22 May 1982	2.05 m (6 ft 9 in)	109 kg (240 lb)	351 cm (138 in)	339 cm (133 in)	(Russia) Belogorie Belogorod
5	Sergey Grankin	21 January 1985	1.95 m (6 ft 5 in)	96 kg (212 lb)	351 cm (138 in)	320 cm (130 in)	(Russia) Dinamo Moscow
8	Sergey Tetyukhin	23 September 1975	1.97 m (6 ft 6 in)	89 kg (196 lb)	345 cm (136 in)	338 cm (133 in)	(Russia) Belogorie Belogorod
9	Aleksandr Sokolov	1 March 1982	1.93 m (6 ft 4 in)	97 kg (214 lb)	315 cm (124 in)	310 cm (120 in)	(Russia) Fakel
10	Yury Berezhko	27 January 1984	1.98 m (6 ft 6 in)	97 kg (214 lb)	346 cm (136 in)	338 cm (133 in)	(Russia) ZENIT Kazan
12	Aleksandr Butko	18 March 1986	1.98 m (6 ft 6 in)	97 kg (214 lb)	339 cm (133 in)	327 cm (129 in)	(Russia) Lokomotiv Novosibirsk
13	Dmitriy Muserskiy	29 October 1988	2.18 m (7 ft 2 in)	104 kg (229 lb)	375 cm (148 in)	347 cm (137 in)	(Russia) Belogorie Belogorod
15	Dmitriy Ilinikh	31 January 1987	2.01 m (6 ft 7 in)	92 kg (203 lb)	338 cm (133 in)	330 cm (130 in)	(Russia) Belogorie Belogorod
17	Maxim Mikhaylov	19 March 1988	2.03 m (6 ft 8 in)	105 kg (231 lb)	345 cm (136 in)	330 cm (130 in)	(Russia) ZENIT Kazan
18	Aleksandr Volkov	14 February 1985	2.10 m (6 ft 11 in)	90 kg (200 lb)	360 cm (140 in)	335 cm (132 in)	(Russia) ZENIT Kazan
20	Aleksey Obmochaev (L)	22 May 1989	1.89 m (6 ft 2 in)	84 kg (185 lb)	325 cm (128 in)	310 cm (120 in)	(Russia) ZENIT Kazan

=== United States ===
The following is the American roster in the men's volleyball tournament of the 2012 Summer Olympics.

Head coach: Alan Knipe

No.	Name	Date of birth	Height	Weight	Spike	Block	2012 club
1	Matt Anderson	18 April 1987	2.04 m (6 ft 8 in)	86 kg (190 lb)	360 cm (140 in)	332 cm (131 in)	(Italy) Pallavolo Modena
2	Sean Rooney	13 November 1982	2.06 m (6 ft 9 in)	100 kg (220 lb)	354 cm (139 in)	336 cm (132 in)	(Italy) Pallavolo Gabeca
4	David Lee	8 March 1982	2.03 m (6 ft 8 in)	105 kg (231 lb)	350 cm (140 in)	325 cm (128 in)	(Russia) Dinamo Moscow
5	Richard Lambourne (L)	6 May 1975	1.90 m (6 ft 3 in)	90 kg (200 lb)	324 cm (128 in)	312 cm (123 in)	Unattached
6	Paul Lotman	3 November 1985	2.00 m (6 ft 7 in)	102 kg (225 lb)	336 cm (132 in)	312 cm (123 in)	(Poland) ASSECO Resovia Rzeszów
7	Donald Suxho	21 February 1976	1.96 m (6 ft 5 in)	98 kg (216 lb)	337 cm (133 in)	319 cm (126 in)	(Italy) Sisley Volley
8	William Priddy	1 October 1977	1.94 m (6 ft 4 in)	89 kg (196 lb)	353 cm (139 in)	330 cm (130 in)	(Russia) ZENIT Kazan
11	Brian Thornton	22 April 1985	1.90 m (6 ft 3 in)	88 kg (194 lb)	327 cm (129 in)	314 cm (124 in)	(Poland) Jastrzębski Węgiel
12	Russell Holmes	1 July 1982	2.05 m (6 ft 9 in)	95 kg (209 lb)	352 cm (139 in)	335 cm (132 in)	(Poland) Jastrzębski Węgiel
13	Clayton Stanley (c)	20 January 1978	2.05 m (6 ft 9 in)	104 kg (229 lb)	357 cm (141 in)	332 cm (131 in)	(Russia) Ural Ufa
16	David McKienzie	5 July 1979	1.93 m (6 ft 4 in)	95 kg (209 lb)	358 cm (141 in)	340 cm (130 in)	Kuwait SC
20	David Smith	15 May 1985	2.01 m (6 ft 7 in)	86 kg (190 lb)	348 cm (137 in)	314 cm (124 in)	(France) Tours VB

=== Serbia ===
The following is the Serbian roster in the men's volleyball tournament of the 2012 Summer Olympics.

Head coach: (Montenegro) Igor Kolaković

№	Name	Date of birth	Height	Weight	Spike	Block	2012 club
1	Nikola Kovačević	14 February 1983	1.93 m (6 ft 4 in)	78 kg (172 lb)	350 cm (140 in)	340 cm (130 in)	(Russia) Gubernia Nizhniy Novgorod
2	Uroš Kovačević	6 May 1993	1.97 m (6 ft 6 in)	90 kg (200 lb)	340 cm (130 in)	310 cm (120 in)	(Slovenia) ACH Volley
4	Bojan Janić (c)	11 March 1982	1.98 m (6 ft 6 in)	83 kg (183 lb)	345 cm (136 in)	322 cm (127 in)	(Russia) Fakel
5	Vlado Petković	6 January 1983	1.98 m (6 ft 6 in)	97 kg (214 lb)	325 cm (128 in)	318 cm (125 in)	(Italy) Umbria Volley
7	Dragan Stanković	18 October 1985	2.05 m (6 ft 9 in)	86 kg (190 lb)	343 cm (135 in)	333 cm (131 in)	(Italy) Lube Banca Marche
10	Miloš Nikić	31 March 1986	1.94 m (6 ft 4 in)	79 kg (174 lb)	350 cm (140 in)	330 cm (130 in)	(Italy) Pallavolo Gabeca
11	Mihajlo Mitić	17 September 1990	2.01 m (6 ft 7 in)	90 kg (200 lb)	335 cm (132 in)	320 cm (130 in)	(Serbia) OK Crvena Zvezda
12	Milan Rašić	2 February 1985	2.05 m (6 ft 9 in)	86 kg (190 lb)	340 cm (130 in)	320 cm (130 in)	(Slovenia) ACH Volley
14	Aleksandar Atanasijević	4 September 1991	2.01 m (6 ft 7 in)	84 kg (185 lb)	345 cm (136 in)	321 cm (126 in)	(Poland) Skra Bełchatów
15	Saša Starović	19 October 1988	2.07 m (6 ft 9 in)	89 kg (196 lb)	335 cm (132 in)	321 cm (126 in)	(Italy) Andreoli Latina
18	Marko Podraščanin	29 August 1987	2.04 m (6 ft 8 in)	92 kg (203 lb)	343 cm (135 in)	326 cm (128 in)	(Italy) Lube Banca Marche
19	Nikola Rosić (L)	5 August 1984	1.92 m (6 ft 4 in)	85 kg (187 lb)	328 cm (129 in)	315 cm (124 in)	(Germany) VfB Friedrichshafen

=== Germany ===
The following is the German roster in the men's volleyball tournament of the 2012 Summer Olympics.

Head coach: (Belgium) Vital Heynen

№	Name	Date of birth	Height	Weight	Spike	Block	2012 club
1	Marcus Popp	23 September 1981	1.92 m (6 ft 4 in)	90 kg (200 lb)	358 cm (141 in)	338 cm (133 in)	(France) Tours VB
2	Markus Steuerwald (L)	7 March 1989	1.82 m (6 ft 0 in)	85 kg (187 lb)	340 cm (130 in)	318 cm (125 in)	(France) Paris Volley
3	Sebastian Schwarz	2 October 1985	1.97 m (6 ft 6 in)	94 kg (207 lb)	340 cm (130 in)	325 cm (128 in)	(Italy) Fidia Padova
4	Simon Tischer	24 April 1982	1.94 m (6 ft 4 in)	88 kg (194 lb)	346 cm (136 in)	328 cm (129 in)	(Poland) Jastrzębski Węgiel
5	Björn Andrae (c)	14 May 1981	2.00 m (6 ft 7 in)	92 kg (203 lb)	350 cm (140 in)	330 cm (130 in)	(Russia) VC Kuzbass Kemerovo
6	Denys Kaliberda	24 June 1990	1.93 m (6 ft 4 in)	95 kg (209 lb)	343 cm (135 in)	314 cm (124 in)	(Italy) Vibo Valentia
8	Marcus Böhme	25 August 1985	2.11 m (6 ft 11 in)	116 kg (256 lb)	360 cm (140 in)	330 cm (130 in)	(Germany) VfB Friedrichshafen
9	Georg Grozer	27 November 1984	2.00 m (6 ft 7 in)	102 kg (225 lb)	374 cm (147 in)	345 cm (136 in)	(Russia) Belogorie Belogorod
10	Jochen Schöps	8 October 1983	2.00 m (6 ft 7 in)	100 kg (220 lb)	360 cm (140 in)	335 cm (132 in)	(Poland) ASSECO Resovia Rzeszów
11	Lukas Kampa	29 November 1986	1.96 m (6 ft 5 in)	90 kg (200 lb)	335 cm (132 in)	320 cm (130 in)	(Russia) Belogorie Belogorod
13	Christian Dünnes	16 June 1984	2.07 m (6 ft 9 in)	105 kg (231 lb)	350 cm (140 in)	331 cm (130 in)	(Germany) TSV Unterhaching
15	Max Günthör	9 August 1985	2.07 m (6 ft 9 in)	93 kg (205 lb)	350 cm (140 in)	325 cm (128 in)	(Germany) TSV Unterhaching

=== Tunisia ===
The following is the Tunisian roster in the men's volleyball tournament of the 2012 Summer Olympics.

Head coach: Fethi Mkaouer

№	Name	Date of birth	Height	Weight	Spike	Block	2012 club
2	Ahmed Kadhi	19 April 1989	1.98 m (6 ft 6 in)	97 kg (214 lb)	345 cm (136 in)	318 cm (125 in)	(Tunisia) C.O. Kelibia
3	Marouane M'rabet	5 June 1985	1.86 m (6 ft 1 in)	81 kg (179 lb)	315 cm (124 in)	296 cm (117 in)	(Tunisia) C.O. Kelibia
7	Elyes Karamosli	22 August 1989	1.95 m (6 ft 5 in)	97 kg (214 lb)	320 cm (130 in)	303 cm (119 in)	(Tunisia) E.S. Tunis
8	Mohamed Ben Slimane	29 November 1981	1.87 m (6 ft 2 in)	73 kg (161 lb)	312 cm (123 in)	294 cm (116 in)	(Tunisia) E.S. Sahel
10	Hamza Nagga	29 May 1990	1.96 m (6 ft 5 in)	84 kg (185 lb)	326 cm (128 in)	311 cm (122 in)	(Tunisia) C.O. Kelibia
11	Ismail Moalla	30 January 1990	1.95 m (6 ft 5 in)	67 kg (148 lb)	324 cm (128 in)	308 cm (121 in)	(Tunisia) CS Sfaxien
12	Anouer Taouerghi (L)	17 August 1983	1.78 m (5 ft 10 in)	77 kg (170 lb)	302 cm (119 in)	292 cm (115 in)	(Tunisia) CS Sfaxien
13	Noureddine Hfaiedh (c)	27 August 1973	1.97 m (6 ft 6 in)	86 kg (190 lb)	350 cm (140 in)	315 cm (124 in)	(Tunisia) E.S. Sahel
14	Bilel Ben Hassine	22 June 1983	1.95 m (6 ft 5 in)	88 kg (194 lb)	330 cm (130 in)	315 cm (124 in)	(Tunisia) CS Sfaxien
15	Mehdi Ben Cheikh	13 May 1979	1.83 m (6 ft 0 in)	74 kg (163 lb)	318 cm (125 in)	302 cm (119 in)	(Tunisia) E.S. Tunis
16	Hichem Kaabi	13 September 1986	1.94 m (6 ft 4 in)	82 kg (181 lb)	340 cm (130 in)	315 cm (124 in)	(Tunisia) E.S. Tunis
18	Hakim Zouari	28 March 1988	1.97 m (6 ft 6 in)	95 kg (209 lb)	335 cm (132 in)	320 cm (130 in)	(Tunisia) CS Sfaxien

== See also ==
- Volleyball at the 2012 Summer Olympics – Women's team rosters
