= 2017 FIVB Volleyball World League =

Men's volleyball tournament

2017 World League
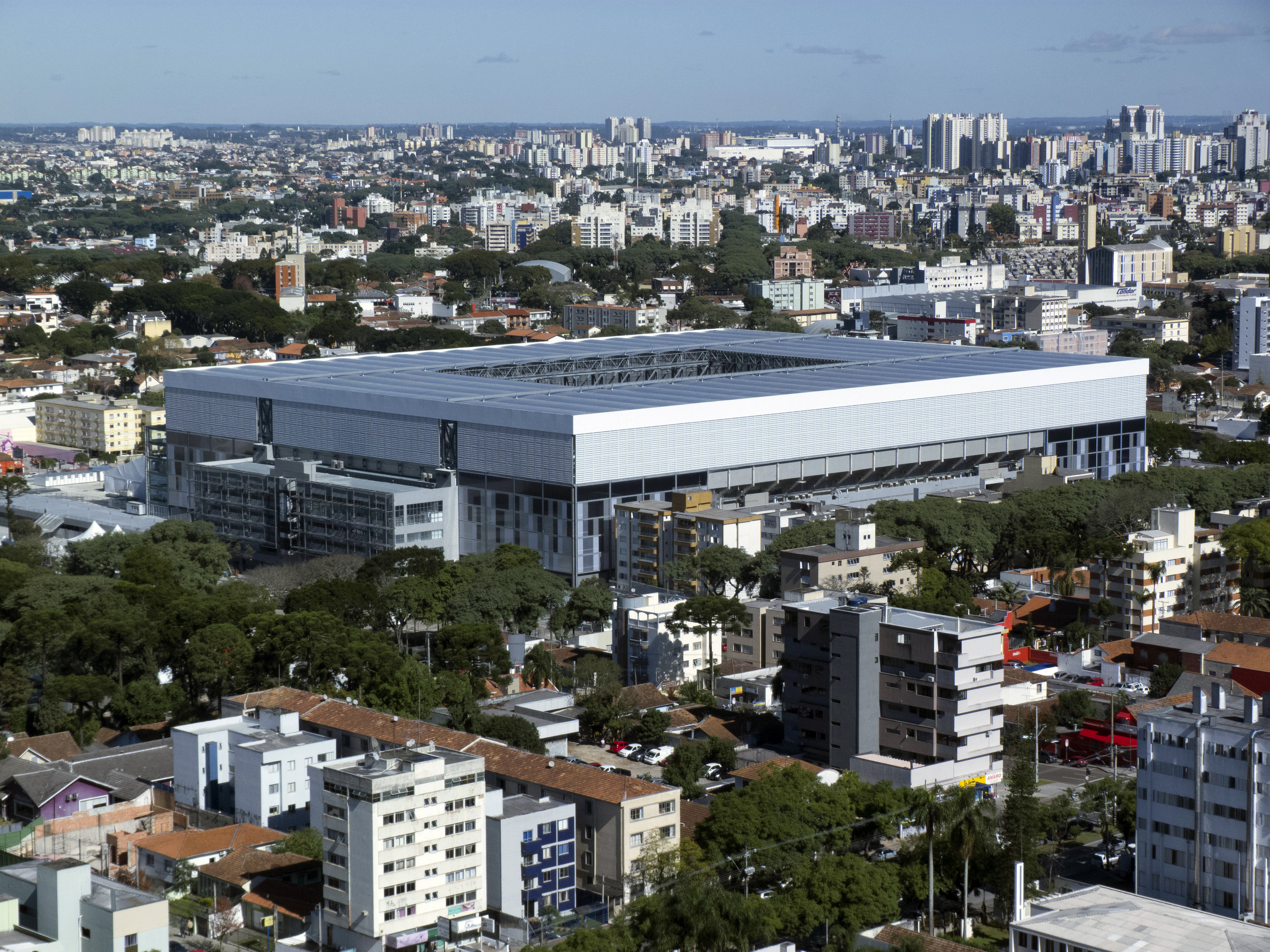
- The Arena da Baixada hosted the final round

Tournament details
- Host country: Brazil
- City: Curitiba (Group 1 Final)
- Dates: 2 June – 8 July
- Teams: 36 (from 5 confederations)
- Venues: 28 (in 28 host cities)

Final positions
- Champions: France (2nd title)
- Runners-up: Brazil
- Third place: Canada
- Fourth place: United States

Tournament awards
- MVP: (France) Earvin N'Gapeth
- Best Setter: (France) Benjamin Toniutti
- Best OH: (Brazil) Ricardo Lucarelli (France) Earvin N'Gapeth
- Best MB: (Canada) Graham Vigrass (France) Kévin Le Roux
- Best OPP: (Brazil) Wallace de Souza
- Best Libero: (Canada) Blair Bann

Tournament statistics
- Matches played: 161
- Attendance: 491,585 (3,053 per match)

The 2017 FIVB Volleyball World League was the 28th edition of the annual men's international volleyball tournament played by 36 teams between 2 June and 8 July. The Group 1 Final Round was held in Curitiba, Brazil.

In front of a crowd of 23,149 fans, France lifted the FIVB Volleyball World League trophy for the second time in their history, prevailing in an epic battle over hosts Brazil 3–2. This marked the fifth time in the last seven editions that Brazil reached the final and did not win the gold medal. Canada wrapped up their best ever World League campaign by seizing the bronze medal (their first medal at an international FIVB event) after a come-from-behind 3–1 win over the United States. Earvin N'Gapeth was elected the Most Valuable Player for the second time, after also being the MVP in 2015.

Slovenia defeated Japan in the Group 2 finals in Gold Coast, Australia to achieve their second straight group title since their debut last year (the team had previously won Group 3 in 2016).

Moreover, Estonia finished atop Group 3 in their first ever World League participation after a convincing 3–0 win over Spain in the final match in León, Mexico.

On 11 June 2017, the new one-set-score world record for national teams was established in the Group 3 intercontinental round match between Qatar and Venezuela. They spent 49 minutes in a 45–43 third set that was won by Qatar. The previous highest set score was 44–42, which had happened twice (in the 1999 FIVB Volleyball World League match between Canada and Brazil, and in the 2016 World Olympic Qualifying Tournament match between France and Australia).

== Qualification ==
- Excluding Cuba and Puerto Rico, which withdrew from the tournament, the remaining 34 teams from the 2016 edition directly qualified.
- Estonia and Austria qualified through the 2016 European League.

Africa	Asia and Oceania	Europe	North America	South America
Egypt; Tunisia	Australia; China; Chinese Taipei; Iran; Japan; Kazakhstan; Qatar; South Korea	Austria^{1} Belgium; Bulgaria; Czech Republic; Estonia^{1} Finland; France; Germany; Greece; Italy Montenegro; Netherlands; Poland; Portugal; Russia; Serbia; Slovakia; Slovenia; Spain; Turkey	Canada; Mexico; United States	Argentina; Brazil; Venezuela

^{1} Teams making their debuts.

== Format ==
=== Intercontinental round ===
- Group 1, the 12 teams were drawn into 9 pools of 4 teams. In each pool, all teams will compete in a round robin format. The results of all 9 pools will combine in 1 ranking table. The hosts and the top five ranked teams will play in the final round. The last ranked team after the Intercontinental Round could be relegated if the winners of the Group 2 Final Round can meet the promotion requirements set by the FIVB.
- Group 2, the 12 teams were drawn in 9 pools of 4 teams. In each pool, all teams will compete in round robin format. The results of all 9 pools will combine in 1 ranking table. The hosts and the top three ranked teams will play in the final round. The last ranked team after the Intercontinental Round could be relegated if the winners of the Group 3 Final Round can meet the promotion requirements set by the FIVB.
- Group 3, the 12 teams were drawn into 6 pools of 4 teams. In each pool, all teams will compete in round robin format. The results of all 6 pools will combine in 1 ranking table. The hosts and the top three ranked teams will play in the final round.

=== Final round ===
- Group 1, the 6 teams in the final round will be divided in 2 pools determined by the serpentine system. The host team will be at the top position and the other teams will be allocated by their rankings in the preliminary round. The top 2 teams from each pool will play in the semifinals. The winning teams will play in the final match for the gold medals.
- Group 2 and Group 3, the host team will face the last ranked team among the qualified teams in the semifinals. The other 2 teams will play against each other in the other semifinal. The winning teams will play in the final match for the gold medals and a chance for promotion.

== Pools composition ==
The pools were announced on 13 September 2016.

=== Group 1 ===
Week 1
Pool A1 Italy	Pool B1 Serbia	Pool C1 Russia
Brazil; Italy; Poland; Iran	Serbia; United States; Canada; Belgium	France; Russia; Bulgaria; Argentina
Week 2
Pool D1 Iran	Pool E1 Bulgaria	Pool F1 France
Serbia; Argentina; Belgium; Iran	Brazil; Poland; Canada; Bulgaria	France; Russia; United States; Italy
Week 3
Pool G1 Argentina	Pool H1 Poland	Pool I1 Belgium
Serbia; Brazil; Bulgaria; Argentina	United States; Russia; Poland; Iran	France; Italy; Canada; Belgium

=== Group 2 ===
Week 1
Pool A2 South Korea	Pool B2 Slovakia	Pool C2 Turkey
South Korea; Czech Republic; Slovenia; Finland	Portugal; Japan; Australia; Slovakia	Netherlands; Egypt; Turkey; China
Week 2
Pool D2 Finland	Pool E2 Japan	Pool F2 Czech Republic
Australia; China; Slovakia; Finland	Japan; Slovenia; South Korea; Turkey	Netherlands; Egypt; Portugal; Czech Republic
Week 3
Pool G2 China	Pool H2 Egypt	Pool I2 Netherlands
Australia; Japan; Turkey; China	Portugal; Egypt; Slovenia; Finland	Netherlands; Czech Republic; South Korea; Slovakia

=== Group 3 ===
Week 1
Pool A3 Spain	Pool B3 Montenegro	Pool C3 Germany
Spain; Greece; Mexico; Qatar	Montenegro; Chinese Taipei; Tunisia; Estonia	Germany; Austria; Kazakhstan; Venezuela
Week 2
Pool D3 Estonia	Pool E3 Tunisia	Pool F3 Austria
Estonia; Greece; Venezuela; Qatar	Tunisia; Chinese Taipei; Montenegro; Kazakhstan	Austria; Germany; Spain; Mexico

=== Final round ===
Week 6
Group 1 Brazil
Pool J1; Brazil; Russia; Canada Pool K1; France; Serbia; United States
Week 4	Week 3
Group 2 Australia	Group 3 Mexico
Australia; Slovenia; Netherlands; Japan	Mexico; Germany; Spain; Estonia

== Competition schedule ==
●	Intercontinental round	●	Final round

	Week 1 2–4 Jun	Week 2 8–11 Jun	Week 3 15–18 Jun	Week 4 24–25 Jun	Week 6 4–8 Jul
Group 1	18 matches	18 matches	18 matches		10 matches
Group 2	18 matches	18 matches	18 matches	4 matches	
Group 3	18 matches	18 matches	4 matches		

== Pool standing procedure ==
1. Number of matches won
2. Match points
3. Sets ratio
4. Points ratio
5. If the tie continues as per the point ratio between two teams, the priority will be given to the team which won the last match between them. When the tie in points ratio is between three or more teams, a new classification of these teams in the terms of points 1, 2 and 3 will be made taking into consideration only the matches in which they were opposed to each other.

Match won 3–0 or 3–1: 3 match points for the winner, 0 match points for the loser
Match won 3–2: 2 match points for the winner, 1 match point for the loser

== Intercontinental round ==
=== Group 1 ===
==== Ranking ====
Pos	Team	Pld	W	L	Pts	SW	SL	SR	SPW	SPL	SPR	Qualification
1	France	9	8	1	25	26	7	3.714	792	673	1.177	Group 1 Final round
2	Brazil (Note: Qualified as hosts) (H)	9	6	3	19	22	14	1.571	817	786	1.039	Group 1 Final round
3	Serbia	9	6	3	18	21	14	1.500	797	767	1.039	Group 1 Final round
4	Russia	9	5	4	14	19	16	1.188	787	775	1.015	Group 1 Final round
5	Canada	9	5	4	12	18	20	0.900	844	858	0.984	Group 1 Final round
6	United States	9	4	5	14	19	16	1.188	816	804	1.015	Group 1 Final round
7	Belgium	9	4	5	14	18	19	0.947	808	820	0.985	
8	Poland	9	4	5	12	17	19	0.895	806	801	1.006	
9	Bulgaria	9	4	5	10	16	22	0.727	819	861	0.951	
10	Argentina	9	3	6	11	15	22	0.682	800	837	0.956	
11	Iran	9	3	6	7	11	23	0.478	739	795	0.930	
12	Italy	9	2	7	6	13	23	0.565	798	846	0.943	Relegated position

(H) Host

==== Week 1 ====
===== Pool A1 =====
- Venue: Adriatic Arena, Pesaro, Italy
- All times are Central European Summer Time (UTC+02:00).

Date	Time		Score		Set 1	Set 2	Set 3	Set 4	Set 5	Total	Report
2 Jun	17:00	Brazil	2–3	Poland	20–25	25–20	25–19	22–25	8–15	100–104	P2 P3
2 Jun	20:00	Italy	3–0	Iran	25–22	25–23	25–22			75–67	P2 P3
3 Jun	14:00	Italy	1–3	Poland	25–21	17–25	18–25	23–25		83–96	P2 P3
3 Jun	17:00	Iran	1–3	Brazil	25–21	19–25	22–25	22–25		88–96	P2 P3
4 Jun	14:00	Italy	1–3	Brazil	15–25	25–17	23–25	22–25		85–92	P2 P3
4 Jun	17:00	Poland	1–3	Iran	25–18	23–25	23–25	22–25		93–93	P2 P3

===== Pool B1 =====
- Venue: SPC Vojvodina, Novi Sad, Serbia
- All times are Central European Summer Time (UTC+02:00).

Date	Time		Score		Set 1	Set 2	Set 3	Set 4	Set 5	Total	Report
2 Jun	16:00	Belgium	2–3	Canada	22–25	25–19	24–26	25–23	13–15	109–108	P2 P3
2 Jun	19:00	Serbia	3–1	United States	25–18	23–25	25–20	25–21		98–84	P2 P3
3 Jun	16:00	Canada	3–2	United States	23–25	25–19	18–25	25–23	15–11	106–103	P2 P3
3 Jun	19:00	Belgium	3–0	Serbia	25–20	25–18	25–23			75–61	P2 P3
4 Jun	16:00	United States	1–3	Belgium	23–25	16–25	25–22	26–28		90–100	P2 P3
4 Jun	19:00	Canada	1–3	Serbia	23–25	21–25	25–20	20–25		89–95	P2 P3

===== Pool C1 =====
- Venue: Kazan Volleyball Centre, Kazan, Russia
- All times are Moscow Time (UTC+03:00).

Date	Time		Score		Set 1	Set 2	Set 3	Set 4	Set 5	Total	Report
2 Jun	16:10	France	3–0	Bulgaria	25–23	25–15	25–22			75–60	P2 P3
2 Jun	19:10	Russia	3–0	Argentina	25–17	25–18	25–19			75–54	P2 P3
3 Jun	16:10	Bulgaria	2–3	Argentina	23–25	25–23	25–20	21–25	12–15	106–108	P2 P3
3 Jun	19:10	Russia	1–3	France	13–25	20–25	25–22	21–25		79–97	P2 P3
4 Jun	16:10	Argentina	0–3	France	17–25	25–27	22–25			64–77	P2 P3
4 Jun	19:10	Russia	2–3	Bulgaria	25–21	25–15	22–25	25–27	13–15	110–103	P2 P3

==== Week 2 ====
===== Pool D1 =====
- Venue: Azadi Indoor Stadium, Tehran, Iran
- All times are Iran Daylight Time (UTC+04:30).

Date	Time		Score		Set 1	Set 2	Set 3	Set 4	Set 5	Total	Report
9 Jun	18:10	Serbia	3–0	Argentina	25–18	25–22	25–23			75–63	P2 P3
9 Jun	21:10	Iran	3–2	Belgium	23–25	25–17	25–22	23–25	15–12	111–101	P2 P3
10 Jun	18:10	Belgium	3–2	Argentina	23–25	25–20	25–23	24–26	15–6	112–100	P2 P3
10 Jun	21:15	Iran	1–3	Serbia	20–25	23–25	25–16	16–25		84–91	P2 P3
11 Jun	18:10	Serbia	3–0	Belgium	25–22	25–18	25–20			75–60	P2 P3
11 Jun	21:10	Iran	3–2	Argentina	29–27	25–20	20–25	23–25	15–11	112–108	P2 P3

===== Pool E1 =====
- Venue: Palace of Culture and Sports, Varna, Bulgaria
- All times are Eastern European Summer Time (UTC+03:00).

Date	Time		Score		Set 1	Set 2	Set 3	Set 4	Set 5	Total	Report
9 Jun	16:10	Canada	1–3	Brazil	25–23	20–25	22–25	23–25		90–98	P2 P3
9 Jun	19:10	Bulgaria	3–2	Poland	25–16	20–25	19–25	25–23	16–14	105–103	P2 P3
10 Jun	16:40	Brazil	3–1	Poland	25–21	25–20	17–25	25–19		92–85	P2 P3
10 Jun	20:40	Canada	3–1	Bulgaria	27–25	30–28	21–25	25–23		103–101	P2 P3
11 Jun	16:40	Poland	3–1	Canada	25–21	27–25	20–25	25–19		97–90	P2 P3
11 Jun	20:40	Brazil	1–3	Bulgaria	22–25	19–25	25–23	19–25		85–98	P2 P3

===== Pool F1 =====
- Venue: Palais des Sports de Pau, Pau, France
- All times are Central European Summer Time (UTC+02:00).

Date	Time		Score		Set 1	Set 2	Set 3	Set 4	Set 5	Total	Report
9 Jun	17:30	Italy	0–3	United States	22–25	23–25	23–25			68–75	P2 P3
9 Jun	20:30	France	3–1	Russia	25–12	22–25	25–21	25–18		97–76	P2 P3
10 Jun	17:30	United States	3–0	Russia	25–20	25–22	25–22			75–64	P2 P3
10 Jun	20:30	France	3–1	Italy	21–25	25–21	25–21	26–24		97–91	P2 P3
11 Jun	15:30	Italy	2–3	Russia	33–31	23–25	25–21	23–25	10–15	114–117	P2 P3
11 Jun	18:50	France	3–1	United States	25–20	18–25	25–22	25–21		93–88	P2 P3

==== Week 3 ====
===== Pool G1 =====
- Venue: Orfeo Superdomo, Córdoba, Argentina
- All times are Argentina Time (UTC−03:00).

Date	Time		Score		Set 1	Set 2	Set 3	Set 4	Set 5	Total	Report
16 Jun	18:10	Brazil	3–0	Bulgaria	25–15	25–19	25–22			75–56	P2 P3
16 Jun	21:10	Argentina	2–3	Serbia	22–25	25–19	22–25	30–28	12–15	111–112	P2 P3
17 Jun	16:10	Bulgaria	3–2	Serbia	25–18	20–25	25–23	24–26	15–12	109–104	P2 P3
17 Jun	19:10	Argentina	3–1	Brazil	19–25	25–21	25–22	25–19		94–87	P2 P3
18 Jun	16:10	Serbia	1–3	Brazil	22–25	16–25	25–17	23–25		86–92	P2 P3
18 Jun	19:10	Argentina	3–1	Bulgaria	25–16	25–21	23–25	25–19		98–81	P2 P3

===== Pool H1 =====
- Venues: Spodek, Katowice, Poland (15 June) and Atlas Arena, Łódź, Poland (17–18 June)
- All times are Central European Summer Time (UTC+02:00).

Date	Time		Score		Set 1	Set 2	Set 3	Set 4	Set 5	Total	Report
15 Jun	17:25	Iran	0–3	United States	17–25	22–25	28–30			67–80	P2 P3
15 Jun	20:25	Poland	0–3	Russia	22–25	17–25	21–25			60–75	P2 P3
17 Jun	17:25	United States	2–3	Russia	29–31	25–17	19–25	29–27	13–15	115–115	P2 P3
17 Jun	21:00	Poland	3–0	Iran	25–17	25–18	25–22			75–57	P2 P3
18 Jun	17:25	Russia	3–0	Iran	26–24	25–18	25–18			76–60	P2 P3
18 Jun	20:25	Poland	1–3	United States	31–29	17–25	25–27	20–25		93–106	P2 P3

===== Pool I1 =====
- Venue: Lotto Arena, Antwerp, Belgium
- All times are Central European Summer Time (UTC+02:00).

Date	Time		Score		Set 1	Set 2	Set 3	Set 4	Set 5	Total	Report
16 Jun	17:10	Italy	3–2	France	20–25	25–21	24–26	25–20	16–14	110–106	P2 P3
16 Jun	20:10	Belgium	2–3	Canada	23–25	13–25	26–24	25–22	10–15	97–111	P2 P3
17 Jun	17:10	France	3–0	Canada	25–16	25–15	25–21			75–52	P2 P3
17 Jun	20:10	Italy	1–3	Belgium	22–25	24–26	27–25	16–25		89–101	P2 P3
18 Jun	13:00	Canada	3–1	Italy	20–25	25–22	25–14	25–22		95–83	P2 P3
18 Jun	16:00	Belgium	0–3	France	21–25	16–25	16–25			53–75	P2 P3

=== Group 2 ===
==== Ranking ====
Pos	Team	Pld	W	L	Pts	SW	SL	SR	SPW	SPL	SPR	Qualification
1	Slovenia	9	8	1	24	26	10	2.600	873	778	1.122	Group 2 Final round
2	Netherlands	9	7	2	21	24	10	2.400	804	698	1.152	Group 2 Final round
3	Australia (Note: Qualified as hosts) (H)	9	6	3	16	21	15	1.400	826	793	1.042	Group 2 Final round
4	Japan	9	5	4	16	21	18	1.167	873	823	1.061	Group 2 Final round
5	China	9	5	4	15	19	16	1.188	803	815	0.985	
6	South Korea	9	5	4	12	18	20	0.900	796	829	0.960	
7	Slovakia	9	4	5	13	14	17	0.824	673	705	0.955	
8	Czech Republic	9	4	5	12	16	18	0.889	724	771	0.939	
9	Finland	9	3	6	10	15	20	0.750	785	791	0.992	
10	Portugal	9	3	6	10	15	22	0.682	793	837	0.947	
11	Turkey	9	3	6	9	16	22	0.727	848	869	0.976	
12	Egypt	9	1	8	4	9	26	0.346	729	818	0.891	Relegated position

(H) Host

==== Week 1 ====
===== Pool A2 =====
- Venue: Jangchung Arena, Seoul, South Korea
- All times are Korea Standard Time (UTC+09:00).

Date	Time		Score		Set 1	Set 2	Set 3	Set 4	Set 5	Total	Report
2 Jun	16:00	Finland	1–3	Slovenia	22–25	15–25	25–22	23–25		85–97	P2 P3
2 Jun	19:00	South Korea	3–2	Czech Republic	25–17	23–25	24–26	25–19	15–12	112–99	P2 P3
3 Jun	13:00	South Korea	1–3	Slovenia	23–25	25–23	14–25	23–25		85–98	P2 P3
3 Jun	15:30	Czech Republic	3–1	Finland	16–25	25–23	25–22	25–16		91–86	P2 P3
4 Jun	12:00	Slovenia	3–1	Czech Republic	25–19	25–21	23–25	25–16		98–81	P2 P3
4 Jun	14:40	South Korea	3–2	Finland	24–26	25–21	25–23	22–25	15–13	111–108	P2 P3

===== Pool B2 =====
- Venue: Aréna Poprad, Poprad, Slovakia
- All times are Central European Summer Time (UTC+02:00).

Date	Time		Score		Set 1	Set 2	Set 3	Set 4	Set 5	Total	Report
2 Jun	15:00	Australia	3–2	Portugal	21–25	25–20	25–18	22–25	20–18	113–106	P2 P3
2 Jun	18:00	Slovakia	3–0	Japan	25–20	25–20	27–25			77–65	P2 P3
3 Jun	15:00	Japan	2–3	Portugal	21–25	25–19	25–21	24–26	9–15	104–106	P2 P3
3 Jun	18:00	Slovakia	3–1	Australia	25–22	21–25	30–28	25–22		101–97	P2 P3
4 Jun	15:00	Australia	1–3	Japan	18–25	25–17	21–25	22–25		86–92	P2 P3
4 Jun	18:00	Slovakia	3–0	Portugal	25–20	25–23	25–19			75–62	P2 P3

===== Pool C2 =====
- Venue: Başkent Volleyball Hall, Ankara, Turkey
- All times are Turkey Time (UTC+03:00).

Date	Time		Score		Set 1	Set 2	Set 3	Set 4	Set 5	Total	Report
2 Jun	14:00	Netherlands	3–0	Egypt	25–17	25–23	27–25			77–65	P2 P3
2 Jun	17:00	Turkey	3–2	China	25–22	25–20	21–25	24–26	15–12	110–105	P2 P3
3 Jun	14:00	China	3–1	Netherlands	29–27	23–25	25–22	25–23		102–97	P2 P3
3 Jun	17:00	Egypt	0–3	Turkey	20–25	20–25	15–25			55–75	P2 P3
4 Jun	14:00	Turkey	3–2	Netherlands	25–22	23–25	25–18	24–26	17–15	114–106	P2 P3
4 Jun	17:15	Egypt	0–3	China	18–25	20–25	22–25			60–75	P2 P3

==== Week 2 ====
===== Pool D2 =====
- Venue: Hartwall Arena, Helsinki, Finland
- All times are Eastern European Summer Time (UTC+03:00).

Date	Time		Score		Set 1	Set 2	Set 3	Set 4	Set 5	Total	Report
8 Jun	16:00	Australia	3–0	China	25–22	25–13	25–21			75–56	P2 P3
8 Jun	19:00	Finland	3–0	Slovakia	25–19	25–19	25–19			75–57	P2 P3
9 Jun	15:00	Slovakia	0–3	Australia	21–25	19–25	23–25			63–75	P2 P3
9 Jun	18:00	Finland	3–1	China	25–23	21–25	25–21	27–25		98–94	P2 P3
10 Jun	15:00	China	1–3	Slovakia	20–25	25–17	12–25	21–25		78–92	P2 P3
10 Jun	18:00	Finland	1–3	Australia	21–25	25–14	21–25	19–25		86–89	P2 P3

===== Pool E2 =====
- Venue: Takasaki Arena, Takasaki, Japan
- All times are Japan Standard Time (UTC+09:00).

Date	Time		Score		Set 1	Set 2	Set 3	Set 4	Set 5	Total	Report
9 Jun	15:40	Slovenia	3–2	South Korea	25–20	23–25	25–13	24–26	15–12	112–96	P2 P3
9 Jun	19:10	Japan	3–1	Turkey	25–15	26–24	25–27	25–16		101–82	P2 P3
10 Jun	15:40	Turkey	2–3	South Korea	23–25	20–25	25–20	25–17	12–15	105–102	P2 P3
10 Jun	19:10	Japan	3–2	Slovenia	25–22	17–25	25–18	22–25	17–15	106–105	P2 P3
11 Jun	15:40	Slovenia	3–1	Turkey	25–23	25–22	26–28	25–21		101–94	P2 P3
11 Jun	19:10	Japan	3–0	South Korea	25–18	25–18	25–20			75–56	P2 P3

===== Pool F2 =====
- Venue: Budvar Arena, České Budějovice, Czech Republic
- All times are Central European Summer Time (UTC+02:00).

Date	Time		Score		Set 1	Set 2	Set 3	Set 4	Set 5	Total	Report
9 Jun	16:10	Netherlands	3–1	Portugal	22–25	25–22	25–23	25–18		97–88	P2 P3
9 Jun	19:10	Czech Republic	3–2	Egypt	22–25	25–21	23–25	25–23	16–14	111–108	P2 P3
10 Jun	16:10	Portugal	2–3	Egypt	16–25	17–25	25–19	25–21	17–19	100–109	P2 P3
10 Jun	19:10	Netherlands	3–0	Czech Republic	25–19	25–15	25–15			75–49	P2 P3
11 Jun	16:10	Egypt	2–3	Netherlands	25–17	25–19	11–25	18–25	10–15	89–101	P2 P3
11 Jun	19:10	Czech Republic	3–0	Portugal	25–21	25–21	25–16			75–58	P2 P3

==== Week 3 ====
===== Pool G2 =====
- Venue: Kunshan Sports Center Gymnasium, Kunshan, China
- All times are China Standard Time (UTC+08:00).

Date	Time		Score		Set 1	Set 2	Set 3	Set 4	Set 5	Total	Report
16 Jun	15:00	Australia	3–2	Japan	29–27	18–25	24–26	25–21	15–9	111–108	P2 P3
16 Jun	19:00	China	3–0	Turkey	43–41	26–24	25–21			94–86	P2 P3
17 Jun	15:00	Japan	3–2	Turkey	22–25	25–12	22–25	25–19	15–12	109–93	P2 P3
17 Jun	19:00	China	3–1	Australia	17–25	25–19	25–23	25–17		92–84	P2 P3
18 Jun	15:00	Turkey	1–3	Australia	24–26	25–20	21–25	19–25		89–96	P2 P3
18 Jun	19:00	China	3–2	Japan	20–25	28–26	17–25	25–22	17–15	107–113	P2 P3

===== Pool H2 =====
- Venue: Cairo Stadium Indoor Hall 2, Cairo, Egypt
- All times are Eastern European Time (UTC+02:00).

Date	Time		Score		Set 1	Set 2	Set 3	Set 4	Set 5	Total	Report
16 Jun	14:00	Portugal	3–1	Finland	20–25	25–22	25–19	25–22		95–88	P2 P3
16 Jun	21:30	Egypt	0–3	Slovenia	23–25	37–39	23–25			83–89	P2 P3
17 Jun	14:00	Finland	0–3	Slovenia	21–25	23–25	22–25			66–75	P2 P3
17 Jun	21:30	Egypt	1–3	Portugal	25–22	17–25	15–25	21–25		78–97	P2 P3
18 Jun	14:00	Slovenia	3–1	Portugal	25–16	25–21	23–25	25–19		98–81	P2 P3
18 Jun	21:30	Egypt	1–3	Finland	22–25	13–25	25–18	22–25		82–93	P2 P3

===== Pool I2 =====
- Venue: Sportcampus Zuiderpark, The Hague, Netherlands
- All times are Central European Summer Time (UTC+02:00).

Date	Time		Score		Set 1	Set 2	Set 3	Set 4	Set 5	Total	Report
16 Jun	18:00	South Korea	0–3	Netherlands	21–25	16–25	16–25			53–75	P2 P3
16 Jun	20:30	Slovakia	0–3	Czech Republic	16–25	23–25	17–25			56–75	P2 P3
17 Jun	18:00	Netherlands	3–0	Slovakia	25–21	25–23	25–15			75–59	P2 P3
17 Jun	20:30	Czech Republic	0–3	South Korea	18–25	25–27	21–25			64–77	P2 P3
18 Jun	15:30	South Korea	3–2	Slovakia	25–18	18–25	25–18	20–25	15–7	103–93	P2 P3
18 Jun	18:00	Netherlands	3–1	Czech Republic	26–28	25–17	25–21	25–13		101–79	P2 P3

=== Group 3 ===
==== Ranking ====
Pos	Team	Pld	W	L	Pts	SW	SL	SR	SPW	SPL	SPR	Qualification
1	Germany	6	5	1	15	16	5	3.200	522	439	1.189	Group 3 Final round
2	Spain	6	5	1	14	15	7	2.143	516	474	1.089	Group 3 Final round
3	Estonia	6	5	1	13	16	7	2.286	526	441	1.193	Group 3 Final round
4	Austria	6	4	2	11	13	10	1.300	536	455	1.178	
5	Tunisia	6	4	2	11	15	12	1.250	596	561	1.062	
6	Montenegro	6	3	3	9	12	12	1.000	507	511	0.992	
7	Qatar	6	3	3	9	10	10	1.000	464	484	0.959	
8	Chinese Taipei	6	2	4	8	12	14	0.857	555	584	0.950	
9	Mexico (Note: Qualified as hosts) (H)	6	2	4	8	10	13	0.769	498	513	0.971	Group 3 Final round
10	Venezuela	6	2	4	6	8	13	0.615	408	519	0.786	
11	Kazakhstan	6	1	5	3	6	16	0.375	452	531	0.851	
12	Greece	6	0	6	1	4	18	0.222	468	536	0.873	

(H) Host

==== Week 1 ====
===== Pool A3 =====
- Venue: Pavelló de la Vall d'Hebron, Barcelona, Spain
- All times are Central European Summer Time (UTC+02:00).

Date	Time		Score		Set 1	Set 2	Set 3	Set 4	Set 5	Total	Report
2 Jun	17:30	Qatar	3–0	Greece	25–20	25–23	25–21			75–64	P2 P3
2 Jun	20:00	Spain	3–0	Mexico	25–23	25–23	25–21			75–67	P2 P3
3 Jun	15:30	Greece	1–3	Mexico	19–25	22–25	25–23	21–25		87–98	P2 P3
3 Jun	18:00	Spain	3–1	Qatar	25–21	21–25	25–15	25–13		96–74	P2 P3
4 Jun	15:30	Qatar	0–3	Mexico	17–25	25–27	21–25			63–77	P2 P3
4 Jun	18:00	Spain	3–1	Greece	25–21	22–25	25–23	25–23		97–92	P2 P3

===== Pool B3 =====
- Venue: Nikoljac Sports Center, Bijelo Polje, Montenegro
- All times are Central European Summer Time (UTC+02:00).

Date	Time		Score		Set 1	Set 2	Set 3	Set 4	Set 5	Total	Report
2 Jun	17:00	Chinese Taipei	2–3	Estonia	25–23	24–26	17–25	25–20	12–15	103–109	P2 P3
2 Jun	20:00	Montenegro	3–2	Tunisia	18–25	25–15	25–19	25–27	15–9	108–95	P2 P3
3 Jun	17:00	Estonia	1–3	Tunisia	25–18	17–25	21–25	21–25		84–93	P2 P3
3 Jun	20:00	Chinese Taipei	1–3	Montenegro	22–25	14–25	25–22	24–26		85–98	P2 P3
4 Jun	17:00	Tunisia	3–1	Chinese Taipei	19–25	25–19	25–21	25–15		94–80	P2 P3
4 Jun	20:00	Montenegro	0–3	Estonia	18–25	16–25	13–25			47–75	P2 P3

===== Pool C3 =====
- Venue: Fraport Arena, Frankfurt, Germany
- All times are Central European Summer Time (UTC+02:00).

Date	Time		Score		Set 1	Set 2	Set 3	Set 4	Set 5	Total	Report
2 Jun	15:00	Venezuela	0–3	Austria	0–25	0–25	0–25			0–75	Forfeited
2 Jun	18:10	Kazakhstan	0–3	Germany	17–25	16–25	22–25			55–75	P2 P3
3 Jun	15:00	Kazakhstan	1–3	Venezuela	21–25	19–25	25–23	22–25		87–98	P2 P3
3 Jun	18:00	Austria	1–3	Germany	25–22	16–25	23–25	23–25		87–97	P2 P3
4 Jun	15:00	Austria	3–1	Kazakhstan	25–22	21–25	25–11	25–17		96–75	P2 P3
4 Jun	18:00	Germany	3–1	Venezuela	25–15	25–19	22–25	25–14		97–73	P2 P3

==== Week 2 ====
===== Pool D3 =====
- Venue: Kalevi Spordihall, Tallinn, Estonia
- All times are Eastern European Summer Time (UTC+03:00).

Date	Time		Score		Set 1	Set 2	Set 3	Set 4	Set 5	Total	Report
9 Jun	16:00	Venezuela	3–0	Greece	25–20	29–27	25–16			79–63	P2 P3
9 Jun	19:00	Estonia	3–0	Qatar	25–16	25–15	25–20			75–51	P2 P3
10 Jun	16:00	Greece	0–3	Qatar	23–25	21–25	27–29			71–79	P2 P3
10 Jun	19:00	Venezuela	0–3	Estonia	21–25	16–25	19–25			56–75	P2 P3
11 Jun	16:00	Qatar	3–1	Venezuela	27–29	25–16	45–43	25–13		122–101	P2 P3
11 Jun	19:00	Greece	2–3	Estonia	13–25	25–21	25–22	17–25	11–15	91–108	P2 P3

===== Pool E3 =====
- Venue: El Menzah Sports Palace, Tunis, Tunisia
- All times are West Africa Time (UTC+01:00).

Date	Time		Score		Set 1	Set 2	Set 3	Set 4	Set 5	Total	Report
9 Jun	16:00	Montenegro	1–3	Chinese Taipei	22–25	21–25	25–18	17–25		85–93	P2 P3
9 Jun	22:00	Tunisia	1–3	Kazakhstan	25–13	28–30	21–25	21–25		95–93	P2 P3
10 Jun	16:00	Montenegro	3–0	Kazakhstan	25–16	25–17	25–19			75–52	P2 P3
10 Jun	22:00	Tunisia	3–2	Chinese Taipei	25–23	23–25	25–17	20–25	15–12	108–102	P2 P3
11 Jun	16:00	Kazakhstan	1–3	Chinese Taipei	23–25	25–17	21–25	21–25		90–92	P2 P3
11 Jun	22:00	Tunisia	3–2	Montenegro	25–20	25–17	23–25	23–25	15–7	111–94	P2 P3

===== Pool F3 =====
- Venue: TipsArena Linz, Linz, Austria
- All times are Central European Summer Time (UTC+02:00).

Date	Time		Score		Set 1	Set 2	Set 3	Set 4	Set 5	Total	Report
9 Jun	17:45	Mexico	2–3	Spain	25–23	18–25	25–21	19–25	9–15	96–109	P2 P3
9 Jun	20:15	Austria	3–1	Germany	25–20	27–29	30–28	25–23		107–100	P2 P3
10 Jun	17:45	Spain	0–3	Germany	26–28	15–25	19–25			60–78	P2 P3
10 Jun	20:15	Mexico	2–3	Austria	25–21	20–25	25–18	22–25	12–15	104–104	P2 P3
11 Jun	17:45	Germany	3–0	Mexico	25–17	25–22	25–17			75–56	P2 P3
11 Jun	20:15	Austria	0–3	Spain	21–25	19–25	27–29			67–79	P2 P3

== Final round ==
=== Group 3 ===
- Venue: Domo de la Feria, León, Mexico
- All times are Central Daylight Time (UTC−05:00).

==== Final four (Week 3) ====
Semifinals
17 June
Germany	0
Spain	3
17 June
Mexico	0
Estonia	3

Final
18 June
Spain	0
Estonia	3
3rd place match
18 June
Germany	3
Mexico	0

===== Semifinals =====
Date	Time		Score		Set 1	Set 2	Set 3	Set 4	Set 5	Total	Report
17 Jun	17:01	Germany	0–3	Spain	24–26	18–25	22–25			64–76	P2 P3
17 Jun	19:30	Mexico	0–3	Estonia	22–25	13–25	20–25			55–75	P2 P3

===== 3rd place match =====
Date	Time		Score		Set 1	Set 2	Set 3	Set 4	Set 5	Total	Report
18 Jun	16:00	Germany	3–0	Mexico	25–19	25–19	26–24			76–62	P2 P3

===== Final =====
Date	Time		Score		Set 1	Set 2	Set 3	Set 4	Set 5	Total	Report
18 Jun	18:30	Spain	0–3	Estonia	22–25	16–25	21–25			59–75	P2 P3

=== Group 2 ===
- Venue: Carrara Indoor Stadium, Gold Coast, Australia
- All times are Australian Eastern Standard Time (UTC+10:00).

==== Final four (Week 4) ====
Semifinals
24 June
Slovenia	3
Netherlands	0
24 June
Australia	2
Japan	3

Final
25 June
Slovenia	3
Japan	0
3rd place match
25 June
Netherlands	0
Australia	3

===== Semifinals =====
Date	Time		Score		Set 1	Set 2	Set 3	Set 4	Set 5	Total	Report
24 Jun	17:10	Slovenia	3–0	Netherlands	25–15	32–30	25–20			82–65	P2 P3
24 Jun	19:40	Australia	2–3	Japan	25–23	18–25	23–25	25–22	16–18	107–113	P2 P3

===== 3rd place match =====
Date	Time		Score		Set 1	Set 2	Set 3	Set 4	Set 5	Total	Report
25 Jun	13:40	Netherlands	0–3	Australia	27–29	19–25	26–28			72–82	P2 P3

===== Final =====
Date	Time		Score		Set 1	Set 2	Set 3	Set 4	Set 5	Total	Report
25 Jun	16:10	Slovenia	3–0	Japan	25–17	26–24	25–17			76–58	P2 P3

=== Group 1 ===
- Venue: Arena da Baixada, Curitiba, Brazil
- All times are Brasília Time (UTC−03:00).

==== Pool play (Week 6) ====
===== Pool J1 =====
Pos	Team	Pld	W	L	Pts	SW	SL	SR	SPW	SPL	SPR	Qualification
1	Brazil	2	2	0	5	6	3	2.000	198	185	1.070	Semifinals
2	Canada	2	1	1	3	4	3	1.333	163	159	1.025	Semifinals
3	Russia	2	0	2	1	2	6	0.333	168	185	0.908	

Date	Time		Score		Set 1	Set 2	Set 3	Set 4	Set 5	Total	Report
4 Jul	15:05	Brazil	3–1	Canada	25–21	17–25	25–19	25–19		92–84	P2 P3
5 Jul	15:05	Russia	0–3	Canada	23–25	27–29	17–25			67–79	P2 P3
6 Jul	15:05	Brazil	3–2	Russia	25–18	18–25	25–19	22–25	16–14	106–101	P2 P3

===== Pool K1 =====
Pos	Team	Pld	W	L	Pts	SW	SL	SR	SPW	SPL	SPR	Qualification
1	France	2	2	0	4	6	4	1.500	205	213	0.962	Semifinals
2	United States	2	1	1	4	5	4	1.250	205	197	1.041	Semifinals
3	Serbia	2	0	2	1	3	6	0.500	194	194	1.000	

Date	Time		Score		Set 1	Set 2	Set 3	Set 4	Set 5	Total	Report
4 Jul	17:40	France	3–2	United States	27–25	20–25	26–24	17–25	15–12	105–111	P2 P3
5 Jul	17:40	Serbia	1–3	United States	22–25	23–25	25–19	22–25		92–94	P2 P3
6 Jul	18:10	France	3–2	Serbia	25–21	25–20	17–25	18–25	15–11	100–102	P2 P3

==== Final four (Week 6) ====
Semifinals
7 July
Brazil	3
United States	1
7 July
France	3
Canada	1

Final
8 July
Brazil	2
France	3
3rd place match
8 July
United States	1
Canada	3

===== Semifinals =====
Date	Time		Score		Set 1	Set 2	Set 3	Set 4	Set 5	Total	Report
7 Jul	15:05	Brazil	3–1	United States	25–20	23–25	25–20	25–19		98–84	P2 P3
7 Jul	17:50	France	3–1	Canada	25–19	22–25	25–19	25–21		97–84	P2 P3

===== 3rd place match =====
Date	Time		Score		Set 1	Set 2	Set 3	Set 4	Set 5	Total	Report
8 Jul	20:00	United States	1–3	Canada	25–18	20–25	22–25	21–25		88–93	P2 P3

===== Final =====
Date	Time		Score		Set 1	Set 2	Set 3	Set 4	Set 5	Total	Report
8 Jul	23:05	Brazil	2–3	France	25–21	15–25	23–25	25–19	13–15	101–105	P2 P3

== Final standing ==
Rank	Team
1st place, gold medalist(s)	France
2nd place, silver medalist(s)	Brazil
3rd place, bronze medalist(s)	Canada
4	United States
5	Serbia
5	Russia
7	Belgium
8	Poland
9	Bulgaria
10	Argentina
11	Iran
12	Italy
13	Slovenia
14	Japan
15	Australia
16	Netherlands
17	China
18	South Korea
19	Slovakia
20	Czech Republic
21	Finland
22	Portugal
23	Turkey
24	Egypt
25	Estonia
26	Spain
27	Germany
28	Mexico
29	Austria
30	Tunisia
31	Montenegro
32	Qatar
33	Chinese Taipei
34	Venezuela
35	Kazakhstan
36	Greece

2017 World League champions

France
2nd title

14-man Roster for Group 1 Final Round
Grebennikov, Clévenot, Toniutti (c), Lyneel, N'Gapeth, Le Roux, Brizard, Boyer, Le Goff, Bultor, Quesque, T. Rossard, N. Rossard, Chinenyeze
Head coach
L. Tillie

== Awards ==
- Most valuable player
  (France) Earvin N'Gapeth
- Best setter
  (France) Benjamin Toniutti
- Best outside spikers
  (Brazil) Ricardo Lucarelli
  (France) Earvin N'Gapeth
- Best middle blockers
  (Canada) Graham Vigrass
  (France) Kévin Le Roux
- Best opposite spiker
  (Brazil) Wallace de Souza
- Best libero
  (Canada) Blair Bann

== Statistics leaders ==
The statistics of each group follows the vis reports P2 and P3. The statistics include 6 volleyball skills; serve, recept, set, spike, block, and dig. The table below shows the top 5 ranked players in each skill by group plus top scorers as of 24 June 2017.

=== Best scorers ===
Best scorers determined by scored points from spike, block and serve.

	GROUP 1		GROUP 2		GROUP 3	
Rank	Name	Points	Name	Points	Name	Points
1	(France) Stéphen Boyer	165	(Netherlands) Wouter ter Maat	176	(Spain) Andrés Villena	124
2	(Bulgaria) Tsvetan Sokolov	147	(Australia) Paul Carroll	173	(Germany) Simon Hirsch	119
3	(United States) Taylor Sander	146	(China) Jiang Chuan	164	(Mexico) Jorge Barajas	106
4	(Belgium) Bram Van Den Dries	133	(Slovenia) Tine Urnaut	152	(Tunisia) Hamza Nagga	104
5	(Poland) Dawid Konarski	129	(Australia) Nathan Roberts (Japan) Masahiro Yanagida	142	(Estonia) Robert Täht	101

=== Best spikers ===
Best spikers determined by successful spikes in percentage.

	GROUP 1		GROUP 2		GROUP 3	
Rank	Name	%	Name	%	Name	%
1	(Serbia) Marko Ivović	53.94	(Australia) Nathan Roberts	55.34	(Austria) Alexander Berger	58.87
2	(France) Stéphen Boyer	53.15	(Japan) Masahiro Yanagida	54.90	(Qatar) Papemaguette Diagne	58.75
3	(United States) Benjamin Patch	52.86	(Netherlands) Wouter ter Maat	54.38	(Chinese Taipei) Liu Hong-jie	56.88
4	(Poland) Michał Kubiak	50.64	(Turkey) Metin Toy	54.32	(Estonia) Robert Täht	56.85
5	(United States) Taylor Sander	50.43	(Australia) Paul Carroll	53.79	(Germany) Christian Fromm	56.35

=== Best blockers ===
Best blockers determined by the average of stuff blocks per set.

	GROUP 1		GROUP 2		GROUP 3	
Rank	Name	Avg	Name	Avg	Name	Avg
1	(Bulgaria) Nikolay Nikolov	0.74	(Slovakia) Peter Ondrovič	0.77	(Estonia) Ardo Kreek	0.83
2	(Russia) Ilyas Kurkaev	0.71	(Finland) Tommi Siirilä	0.77	(Estonia) Andri Aganits	0.72
3	(United States) David Smith	0.66	(China) Chen Longhai	0.63	(Kazakhstan) Anton Kuznetsov	0.64
4	(Canada) Daniel Jansen Van Doorn	0.59	(Netherlands) Jasper Diefenbach	0.63	(Germany) Simon Hirsch	0.59
5	(Canada) Graham Vigrass	0.56	(Czech Republic) Aleš Holubec	0.56	(Montenegro) Božidar Ćuk	0.58

=== Best servers ===
Best servers determined by the average of aces per set.

	GROUP 1		GROUP 2		GROUP 3	
Rank	Name	Avg	Name	Avg	Name	Avg
1	(France) Stéphen Boyer	0.52	(Japan) Masahiro Yanagida	0.49	(Mexico) Pedro Rangel	0.55
2	(Russia) Dmitry Volkov	0.43	(China) Jiang Chuan	0.43	(Germany) Simon Hirsch	0.41
3	(Brazil) Maurício Souza	0.39	(Egypt) Ahmed Abdelhay	0.37	(Venezuela) Emerson Rodríguez	0.38
4	(Brazil) Ricardo Lucarelli	0.39	(Australia) Nathan Roberts	0.36	(Mexico) Samuel Córdova	0.34
5	(France) Thibault Rossard	0.39	(Egypt) Ahmed Shafik	0.34	(Estonia) Robert Täht	0.34

=== Best setters ===
Best setters determined by the average of running sets per set.

	GROUP 1		GROUP 2		GROUP 3	
Rank	Name	Avg	Name	Avg	Name	Avg
1	(Brazil) Bruno Rezende	6.58	(Japan) Naonobu Fujii	8.43	(Qatar) Borislav Georgiev	9.00
2	(Serbia) Nikola Jovović	5.09	(Turkey) Arslan Ekşi	6.92	(Tunisia) Khaled Ben Slimene	8.59
3	(Iran) Saeid Marouf	5.06	(Finland) Eemi Tervaportti	6.14	(Montenegro) Simo Dabović	8.17
4	(Poland) Fabian Drzyzga	4.44	(Portugal) Tiago Violas	5.19	(Estonia) Kert Toobal	6.14
5	(Argentina) Luciano De Cecco	3.27	(Egypt) Hossam Abdalla	5.14	(Chinese Taipei) Tai Ju-chien	6.08

=== Best diggers ===
Best diggers determined by the average of successful digs per set.

	GROUP 1		GROUP 2		GROUP 3	
Rank	Name	Avg	Name	Avg	Name	Avg
1	(Poland) Paweł Zatorski	2.14	(Netherlands) Dirk Sparidans	1.93		
2	(Canada) Blair Bann	1.88	(China) Tong Jiahua	1.91		
3	(Brazil) Maurício Borges	1.81	(Netherlands) Wouter ter Maat	1.75		
4	(Iran) Milad Ebadipour	1.65	(Czech Republic) Daniel Pfeffer	1.44		
5	(Brazil) Ricardo Lucarelli	1.64	(Australia) Luke Perry	1.39		

=== Best receivers ===
Best receivers determined by efficient receptions in percentage.

	GROUP 1		GROUP 2		GROUP 3	
Rank	Name	%	Name	%	Name	%
1	(Brazil) Maurício Borges	65.83	(Netherlands) Robbert Andringa	64.93	(Austria) Philipp Kroiss	62.22
2	(Canada) John Gordon Perrin	53.25	(Netherlands) Dirk Sparidans	54.97	(Greece) Menelaos Kokkinakis	61.95
3	(Italy) Massimo Colaci	47.25	(Australia) Samuel Walker	53.33	(Montenegro) Marko Bojić	52.41
4	(Poland) Paweł Zatorski	46.78	(Portugal) Ivo Casas	52.41	(Greece) Andreas-Dimitrios Frangos	52.38
5	(Bulgaria) Nikolay Penchev	45.88	(China) Ji Daoshuai	51.23	(Mexico) Jesús Rangel	48.65

== See also ==
- 2017 FIVB Volleyball World Grand Prix
