= Great Britain men's national volleyball team =

Men's national volleyball team representing the UK

Great Britain
- Association: British Volleyball Federation
- Confederation: CEV
- Head coach: Harry Brokking (Indoor); Ian Legrand (Sitting)

Uniforms
Home	Away
- www.britishvolleyball.org

The Great Britain men's national volleyball team is the team representing Great Britain in Olympic volleyball competitions. The Great Britain Volleyball programme team was resumed in 2006 following an agreement of the FIVB to permit the separate Home Nations of England, Scotland, Wales and Northern Ireland to compete together for the 2012 Summer Olympics and 2012 Summer Paralympics.

For other volleyball competitions however, each Home Nation stands and is ranked independently. If any of those teams qualifies for the Olympics, then Team GB will qualify and the British Volleyball Federation will coordinate putting together a representative team.

== Indoor ==
The men's team were ranked 29th in the FIVB world ranking on 22 July 2013, but are currently unranked.

=== Seasons ===
==== 2008 ====
European League (Netherlands, Slovakia, Greece & Portugal)

Date	Opponent	Venue	Score	1	2	3	4	5	Win/Lose
13 Jun	Slovakia	Zilina	0–3	−12	−15	– 16			L
14 Jun	The Netherlands	Zilina	0–3	−22	−20	−16			L
15 Jun	Greece	Zilina	0–3	−18	– 20	– 17			L
27 Jun	Portugal	Sheffield	3–1	−25	17	23	22		W
28 Jun	Slovakia	Sheffield	0–3	−23	−22	−29			L
29 Jun	Greece	Sheffield	3–2	19	−23	−19	21	10	W
4 Jul	The Netherlands	Rotterdam	0–3	−23	−13	−11			L
5 Jul	Portugal	Rotterdam	0–3	−19	−23	−21			L
6 Jul	Slovakia	Rotterdam	0–3	−14	−23	−25			L
11 Jul	Portugal	Povoa De Varzim	0–3	−22	−15	−20			L
12 Jul	The Netherlands	Povoa De Varzim	0–3	−22	−15	−19			L
13 Jul	Greece	Povoa De Varzim	1–3	−17	−20	24	−11		L

==== 2009 ====
1st round World Championship Qualifiers (Belarus & Israel)

Date	Opponents	Venue	Score	1	2	3	4	5	Win/Lose
2 Jan	Israel	Sheffield	1–3	−14	21	−22	−14		L
4 Jan	Belarus	Sheffield	1–3	−23	13	−22	−17		L

European League (Spain, Turkey & Croatia)

Date	Opponents	Venue	Score	1	2	3	4	5	Win/Lose
5 Jun	Spain	Valladolid	0–3	−23	−23	−16			L
6 Jun	Spain	Valladolid	1–3	−12	−21	23	−20		L
13 Jun	Croatia	Edinburgh	3–0	16	22	23			W
14 Jun	Croatia	Edinburgh	3–1	−24	18	16	18		W
20 Jun	Turkey	Amasya	0–3	−14	−16	−20			L
21 Jun	Turkey	Amasya	1–3	−29	25	−22	−19		L
27 Jun	Turkey	Norwich	1–3	21	−18	−21	−17		L
28 Jun	Turkey	Norwich	0–3	−28	−23	−20			L
4 Jul	Croatia	Daruvar	3–0	23	18	23			W
5 Jul	Croatia	Daruvar	3–2	21	−22	22	−19	9	W
11 Jul	Spain	Sheffield	0–3	−20	−20	−22			L
12 Jul	Spain	Sheffield	0–3	−18	−16	−15			L

==== 2010 ====
1st round European Championship (Azerbaijan)

Date	Opponent	Venue	Score	1	2	3	4	5	Win/Lose
8 May	Azerbaijan	Baku	0–3	−21	−18	−22			L
15 May	Azerbaijan	Sheffield	3–0	18	12	18			W

2nd round European Championship Qualifiers (Latvia, Finland & Greece)

Date	Opponent	Venue	Score	1	2	3	4	5	Win/Lose
21 May	Latvia	Riga	1–3	−23	−23	24	−16		L
22 May	Finland	Riga	0–3	−19	−22	−19			L
23 May	Greece	Riga	0–3	−30	−21	−19			L
28 May	Finland	Heraklion	0–3	−22	−22	−17			L
29 May	Greece	Heraklion	2–3	23	−13	22	−15	−15	L
30 May	Latvia	Heraklion	1–3	−23	−23	22	−26		L

European League (Spain, Romania, Slovakia)

Date	Opponent	Venue	Score	1	2	3	4	5	Win/Lose
5 Jun	Slovakia	Sheffield	1–3	−23	19	−23	−23		L
6 Jun	Slovakia	Sheffield	3–0	23	21	22			W
11 Jun	Spain	Salamanca	1–3	−15	18	−23	−26		L
12 Jun	Spain	Salamanca	3–0	22	24	22			W
19 Jun	Romania	Crawley	3–1	−21	18	18	16		W
20 Jun	Romania	Crawley	2–3	23	−15	−21	22	−10	L
25 Jun	Romania	Constanta	0–3	−22	−20	−24			L
26 Jun	Romania	Constanta	2–3	22	−21	20	−28	−13	L
3 Jul	Spain	Sheffield	0–3	−23	−20	−17			L
4 Jul	Spain	Sheffield	0–3	−12	−17	−22			L
9 Jul	Slovakia	Nitra	0–3	−15	−19	−21			L
4 Jul	Slovakia	Nitra	0–3	−15	−23	−21			L

==== 2011 ====
European League (Croatia, Belgium & Slovenia)

Date	Opponent	Venue	Score	1	2	3	4	5	Win/Lose
28 May	Croatia	Sheffield	3–2	–21	–21	24	18	4	W
29 May	Croatia	Sheffield	0–3	–18	–21	–15			L
4 Jun	Belgium	Belgium	3–0	21	24	16			W
15 Jun	Belgium	Belgium	1–3	23	–19	–20	–18		L
10 Jun	Slovenia	Sheffield	1–3	–21	–14	31	–16		L
11 Jun	Slovenia	Sheffield	0–3	–23	–21	–18			L
18 Jun	Slovenia	Ljubljana	1–3	–19	–19	15	–21		L
19 Jun	Slovenia	Ljubljana	3–0	23	16	21			W
25 Jun	Belgium	Crawley	2–3	24	–19	22	–23	–14	L
26 Jun	Belgium	Crawley	3–2	23	–23	23	–22	11	W
9 Jul	Croatia	Croatia	0–3	–22	–19	–20			L
10 Jul	Croatia	Croatia	2–3	–19	23	23	–13	–10	L

Olympic Test Event – Earls Court (London) 20 – 24 July 2011

Date	Opponent	Venue	Score	1	2	3	4	5	Win/Lose
20 Jul	Mexico	Earls Court	3–1	15	20	–21	23		W
21 Jul	Serbia	Earls Court	0–3	–18	–14	–25			L
22 Jul	Brazil	Earls Court	0–3	–19	–22	–12			L
23 Jul	USA	Earls Court	0–3	–23	–23	–23			L
24 Jul	Egypt	Earls Court	3–1	18	–21	22	23		W

==== 2012 ====
1st round European Championships (Albania)

Date	Opponent	Venue	Score	1	2	3	4	5	Win/Lose
12 May	Albania	Tirana	3–0	25	23	20			W
19 May	Albania	Crawley	3–0	17	17	22			W

Olympic Games – Earls Court (London) 29 July – 6 August 2012

Date	Opponent	Venue	Score	1	2	3	4	5	Win/Lose
29 Jul	Bulgaria	Earls Court	0–3	–18	–20	–24			L
31 Jul	Australia	Earls Court	0–3	–15	–18	–20			L
2 Aug	Italy	Earls Court	0–3	–19	–16	–20			L
4 Aug	Poland	Earls Court	0–3	–16	–19	–18			L
6 Aug	Argentina	Earls Court	0–3	–18	–18	–15			L

2nd round European Championships Qualifiers (Belarus, Turkey & Portugal)

Date	Opponent	Venue	Score	1	2	3	4	5	Win/Lose
7 Sep	Portugal	Vila do Conde	2–3	−24	22	20	−18	−10	L
8 Sep	Turkey	Vila do Conde	3–2	−17	20	20	−17	24	W
9 Sep	Belarus	Vila do Conde	1–3	−15	23	−23	−19		L
14 Sep	Turkey	Ankara	0–3	−16	−17	−20			L
15 Sep	Portugal	Ankara	0–3	−18	−17	−26			L
16 Sep	Belarus	Ankara	2–3	20	−14	23	−19	−11	L

== Most recent roster ==
The following is the British roster in the men's volleyball tournament of the 2012 Summer Olympics.

Head coach: (Netherlands) Harry Brokking

№	Name	Date of birth	Height	Weight	Spike	Block	2012 club
1	Peter Bakare	2 July 1989	1.95 m (6 ft 5 in)	93 kg (205 lb)	359 cm (141 in)	339 cm (133 in)	(Netherlands) Landstede Zwolle
2	Ben Pipes (c)	21 October 1986	2.04 m (6 ft 8 in)	91 kg (201 lb)	337 cm (133 in)	318 cm (125 in)	(Netherlands) Landstede Zwolle
3	Dami Bakare	22 September 1988	1.96 m (6 ft 5 in)	89 kg (196 lb)	363 cm (143 in)	339 cm (133 in)	(Belgium) VC Argex Duvel Puurs
4	Daniel Hunter (L)	23 January 1990	1.80 m (5 ft 11 in)	85 kg (187 lb)	320 cm (130 in)	300 cm (120 in)	(Netherlands) Landstede Zwolle
5	Mark Plotyczer	19 February 1987	1.95 m (6 ft 5 in)	81 kg (179 lb)	344 cm (135 in)	316 cm (124 in)	(France) St-Brieuc CAVB
7	Mark McGivern	24 February 1983	1.95 m (6 ft 5 in)	87 kg (192 lb)	352 cm (139 in)	324 cm (128 in)	(France) Avignon Volley-Ball
8	Jason Haldane	23 July 1971	2.03 m (6 ft 8 in)	105 kg (231 lb)	350 cm (140 in)	330 cm (130 in)	(Bulgaria) VC CSKA Sofia
9	Andrew Pink	25 January 1983	1.92 m (6 ft 4 in)	86 kg (190 lb)	349 cm (137 in)	321 cm (126 in)	(France) Amicale Laïque Canteleu-Maromme
10	Nathan French	20 April 1990	1.93 m (6 ft 4 in)	77 kg (170 lb)	333 cm (131 in)	310 cm (120 in)	(France) Avignon Volley-Ball
11	Joel Miller	15 December 1988	1.91 m (6 ft 3 in)	83 kg (183 lb)	329 cm (130 in)	311 cm (122 in)	(Austria) VBK Klagenfurt
12	Christopher Lamont	7 December 1982	1.99 m (6 ft 6 in)	76 kg (168 lb)	337 cm (133 in)	314 cm (124 in)	(France) ASUL Lyon
17	Kieran O'Malley	12 May 1988	1.88 m (6 ft 2 in)	78 kg (172 lb)	320 cm (130 in)	305 cm (120 in)	(Netherlands) Abiant Lycurgus

== Sitting ==
The men's sitting volleyball team finished in Division B 5th place after the Oklahoma 2010 World Championships. After competing in the ECVD Continental Cup 2011, the men's team finished in 7th place.
