= Scott Sherrin =

British television presenter (1972–1996)

- Born: 31 May 1972; London, England
- Died: 7 March 1996 (aged 23); River Thames, England
- Body discovered: March 1996
- Occupations: Actor; TV presenter

Scott Sherrin (London, 31 May 1972 – 7 March 1996) was a multi-talented child star. Originally from London he was adopted and grew up in Springfield, Chelmsford, where he attended The Tyrrells Primary school, and The Boswells School, between productions. At an early age he demonstrated a great talent for both dancing and gymnastics, and was a professional model at just four.

He achieved fame in the early 1980s after appearing on the Channel 4 show Minipops, and recorded several albums with them. He went on to appear in the London stage version of Bugsy Malone. His subsequent career included a number of other stage and television productions: Cats, Fame, Five Guys Named Moe, From the Top, Ragtime, and appeared on the Royal Variety Performance. In 1991, he became a co-presenter of the long-running television magazine show, That's Life!, notable for being the first – and ultimately only – black presenter of the show.

In 1995, Sherrin went missing after reports of erratic behaviour. In March 1996, his body was found in the River Thames at Wapping. His sister later reported heavy use of cannabis as being a major factor in his death. A year after his death, a documentary was made on his life and eventual demise, Black Britain: Scott Sherrin – The Story of a Black Man?.

== See also ==
- List of solved missing person cases
