= Avignon Volley-Ball =

- Short name: AVB
- Founded: 1961
- Ground: Palais Omnisports de Champfleury, Avignon
- Chairman: (France) Thierry Minssen
- Manager: (France) José Amet
- League: Ligue B
- 2013-14: relegated

Uniforms
Home	Away

Avignon Volley-Ball is a French professional Volleyball team based in Avignon, Vaucluse. It is playing in the Ligue B for the 2013/2014 season.

== History ==
Initially, the Volley-ball team was a part of the Rugby league team of Avignon (SOA XIII), but in 1961 the club became independent. In 1996, "AVB" achieved its highest ranking in French volleyball league, finishing at the fourth place and qualifying for the CEV European cup. In 1997, the team also qualified for the CEV cup, due to their participation in the French volley-ball cup final but lost against Paris Université Club 1-3. They were eliminated on the first round by the Avtomobilist St Petersburg. In the 2011/2012 season, they won their third "second division" title and were promoted to French volleyball league.

== Achievements ==
- Coupe de France
  - Runners-up : 1997
- Pro B (second division) (3)
  - Champion : 1999, 2000, 2012,

=== Squad 2013/2014 ===
No.	Name	Nationality	Role
1	Mario Ferrera	Spain	Spiker
2	Clément Daniel	France	Libero
3	Thibault Carn	France	Spiker
4	Bilal M'Barki	France	Spiker
5	Stanislas Rabiller	France	Diagonal
7	Renaud Ventresque	France	Spiker
8	Antoine Aubree	France	Spiker
9	Gaël Tranchot	France	Middle
10	Diego Santos Pinheiro	Brazil	Middle
11	Quentin Rossard	France	Setter
12	Jordi Leugé-Maillet	France	Setter
13	Dylan Davis	United States	Middle
14	Cédric Hominal (capt)	Switzerland	Setter
15	Christopher Suve	France	Diagonal

== Previous players ==
- Loïc De Kergret (France)
- Romain Vadeleux (France)
- Frédéric Havas (France)
- Matti Hietanen (Finland)
- Mark McGivern (United Kingdom)
- Eemi Tervaportti (Finland)
- Nathan French (United Kingdom)
- Mariusz Sordyl (Poland)
- Delano Thomas (United States)
- Mariusz Szyszko (Poland)
- Vladimir Samsonov (Russia)
- Ruslans Sorokins (Latvia)
- Élysée Ossosso (Cameroon)
