= Chancellor Park =

Chancellor Park may refer to:

- Chancellor Park, Essex, England, a housing development
- Chancellor Park, a locality in Sippy Downs, Queensland, Australia
- the Kanzlerpark in Berlin
