= Jelle Ribbens =

Belgian volleyball player (born 1992)

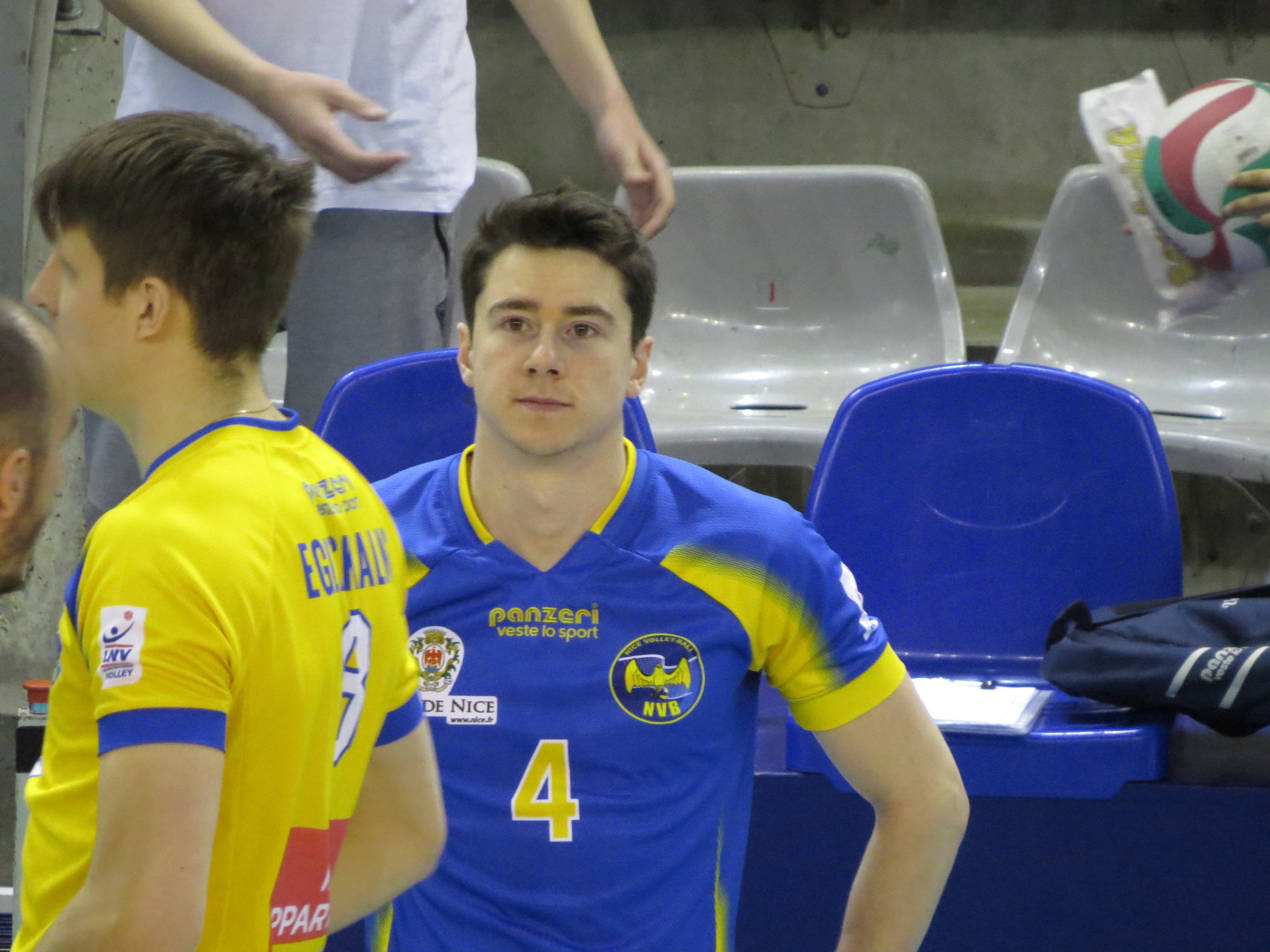

Personal information
- Nationality: Belgian
- Born: 17 March 1992 (age 34); Brasschaat, Belgium
- Height: 1.85 m (6 ft 1 in)
- Weight: 79 kg (174 lb)
- Spike: 331 cm (130 in)
- Block: 300 cm (118 in)

Volleyball information
- Position: Libero
- Current club: Fréjus Var Volley
- Number: 7

Career
Years	Teams
2010–2013; 2013–2014; 2014–2015; 2015–2017; 2017–2018; 2018–2022; 2022-	(Belgium) VC Duvel Puurs (France) Orange Nasseau (France) Grand Nancy Volley-Ball (France) Nice Volley-Ball (France) Spacer's Toulouse Volley (France) Nice Volley-Ball (France) Fréjus Var Volley

National team
2015–	Belgium

Jelle Ribbens (born 17 March 1992) is a Belgian male volleyball player. He is part of the Belgium men's national volleyball team. On club level he played for Maxéville Nancy during 2014–2015. He plays for Nice Volley-Ball.
