= Christopher Lamont =

Christopher Lamont may refer to:

- Christopher Lamont (cricketer), Jamaican cricketer
- Christopher Lamont (volleyball), British volleyball player
