= Chelmer Village =

Housing development in Chelmsford, England

Coordinates: 51.739°N 0.510°E

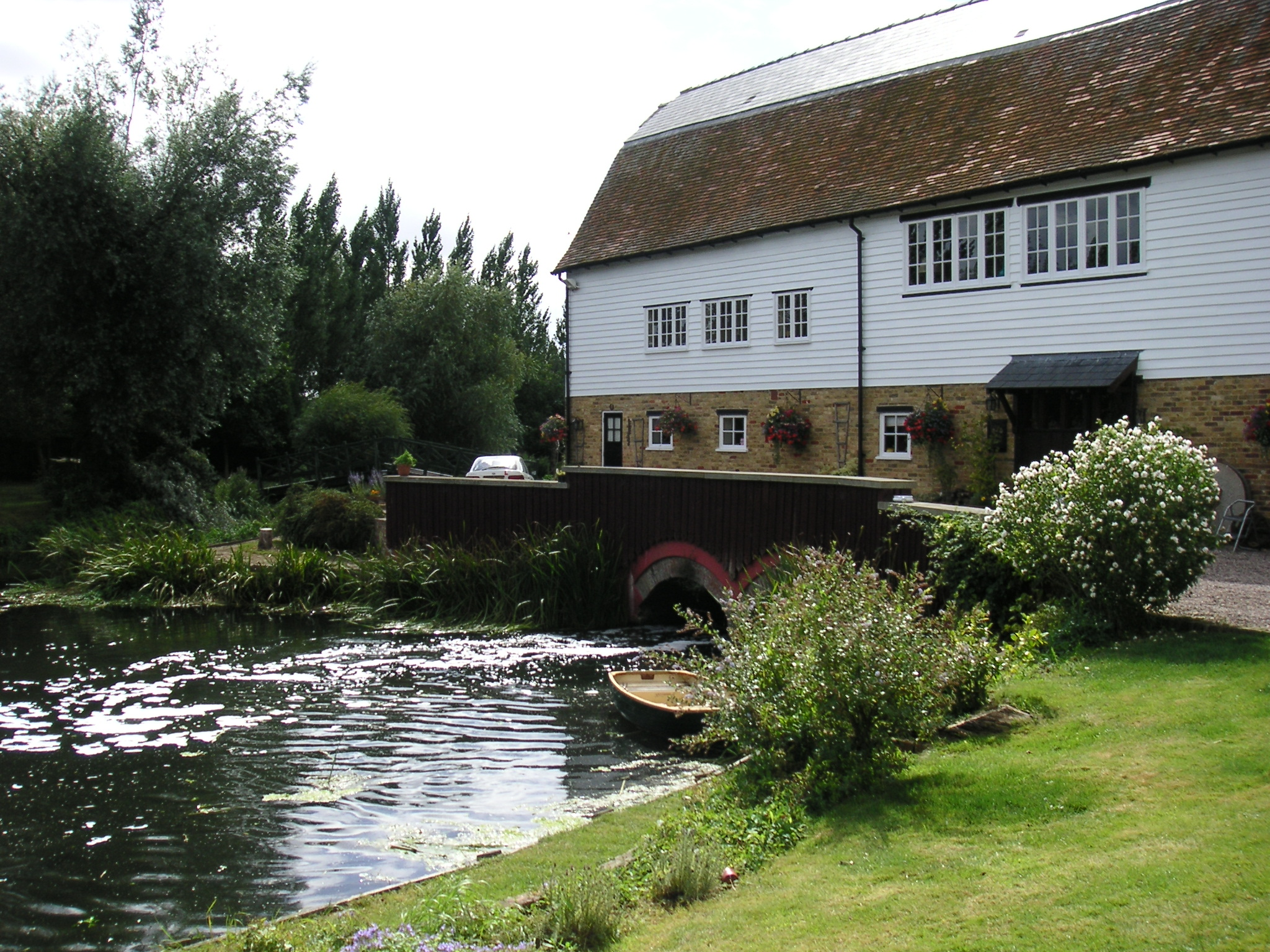
- The privately-owned Barnes Mill in Chelmer Village

- Location within Essex
- Area: 2.1 sq mi (5.4 km^{2})
- Population: 11,277 Ethnic groups: 96.06% White; 1.28% Mixed; 1.22% British Asian; 0.66% Black British; 0.78% Other South Asian
  - Density: 5,370/sq mi (2,070/km^{2})
- OS grid reference: TL734075
  - Charing Cross: 36.7 mi (59.1 km)
- Civil parish: Chelmer
- District: Chelmsford
- Shire county: Essex
- Region: East
- Country: England
- Sovereign state: United Kingdom
- Post town: CHELMSFORD
- Postcode district: CM2
- Dialling code: 01245
- Police: Essex
- Fire: Essex
- Ambulance: East of England
- UK Parliament: Chelmsford
- Website: Parish Council

Chelmer Village is a suburb on the east side of Chelmsford, Essex, England. It was developed as a planned extension to Chelmsford and incorporates housing, retail and industrial development. Construction was started in 1978 by Countryside Residential PLC on the previously greenfield land. It was part of the civil parish of Springfield when first built, until a new civil parish called Chelmer covering the area was created in 2023.

== History ==
Neolithic and Bronze Age settlements have been found in and around Chelmer Village. Early Saxon pottery has been found by Cuton Way, Chelmer Village Way. There is evidence of an early structure at Springfield Lyon's that dates back to 3,000 BC, with a field monument called a causewayed enclosure. Where later, a Bronze Age settlement within the circular ditch was created. The Springfield Lyon's site was later used by the Romans, and by the Anglo-Saxons as a cemetery. A monument depicting a Palaeolithic Flint axe named the Arrow Head Monument has been erected in Chancellor Park to celebrate the early history.

The estate was built upon the farmland of the historic Springfield Barnes manor and opened in 1978, and included the former Barnes Farm, Prentices Farm, Horns Farm and Willshers. The River Chelmer flows along the southern and eastern edges of the suburb (the river also forms part of the Chelmer and Blackwater Navigation) while the development is bordered in the west and north by the A138. A number of historic features remain nearby the river. These include Barnes Mill Lock, Barnes Mill (now a privately owned home) and the Barnes Farm milking parlour, now a bar and restaurant (the Miller and Carter). Barnes Farm infant and junior schools also derive their names from the farmland they were built on.

Chelmer Village is also home to the Chelmer Village Scout Group, based at Barnes Farm School, who offer social events involving the local community.

== Geography ==
Chelmer Village is divided into two parts, the main part of Chelmer Village (in the west) and Chancellor Park (in the east) which was built in 1998; they are divided by Chelmer Village Way, a main road. Chelmer Village Retail Park is also situated here.

== Governance ==
There are three tiers of local government covering Chelmer, at parish (village), district, and county level: Chelmer Village Council, Chelmsford City Council, and Essex County Council. The village council is based at the village hall on Village Square.

The area was historically part of the parish of Springfield. In 2023 a new civil parish called Chelmer was created. The council for the new parish was given the style of "village council" (rather than the default "parish council"), such that the council's name is Chelmer Village Council.

== Sport ==
Wilvale Rangers was formed in 1991 and have over 20 years of connection with Chelmer Village. The club provides football for Junior and Youth football up to 17 years old and as of 2012 began fielding a full men's team in the Chelmsford Sunday League, however the men's team play in Melbourne, Chelmsford. Wilvale Rangers have a good history of winning various youth competitions in the Chelmsford area. The teams play at various venues but historically their home ground is at Chancellor Park pitches, at the bottom of Chancellor Park development.

The local football club is Chelmer Village Athletic who play in the Chelmsford Sunday League Division 2. Chelmer Village Athletic play at Chancellor Park. Chairman Barrie Deer resurrected the Chelmsford Invitation League alongside Gavin Smith of Gallow United in 2000. However Chelmer Village Athletic folded in 2012.

Chelmer Village also field a veterans' football team named Chelmer Vets who also play at Chancellor Park.

Chancellor Park is home to two tennis courts, many football pitches, bowling greens and a sports pavilion, all with floodlights, called Chancellor Park Sports Area.

== Village Square ==
The Village Square is seen as the centre of Chelmer Village and it is home to an Asda supermarket and a number of shops, and the village hall and youth club.

== Education ==
There is an infants and primary school in Chelmer Village: Barnes Farm Infants & Juniors. Chancellor Park Primary School is nearby in Chancellor Park.

There are also two pre-school groups, being 'You and Me' pre-school near the Church, and Rainbow pre-school in the Village hall.
