= Springfield, Essex =

Area of Chelmsford, England

Coordinates: 51.750°N 0.497°E

Springfield
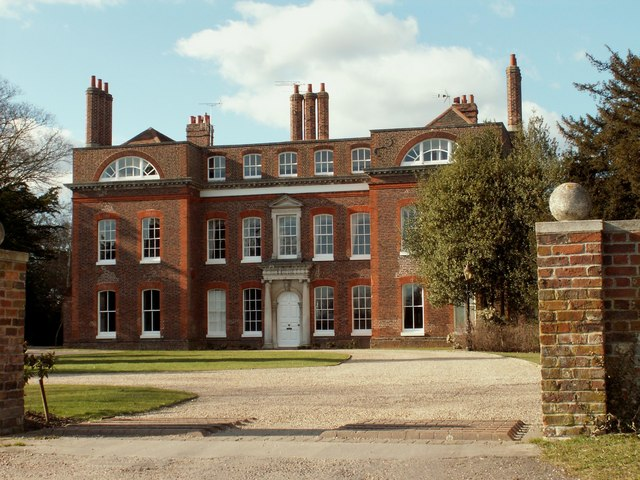
- Springfield Place

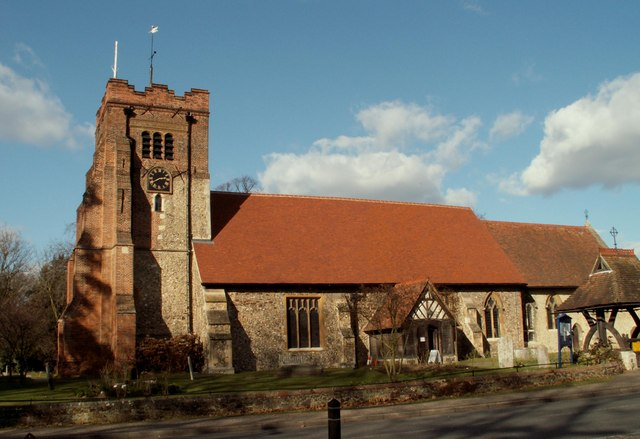
- All Saints' Church

- Location within Essex
- Area: 3.2 sq mi (8.3 km^{2})
- Population: 21,389 (Parish, 2021)
  - Density: 6,684/sq mi (2,581/km^{2})
- OS grid reference: TL724086
  - Charing Cross: 31 mi (50 km)
- Civil parish: Springfield
- District: Chelmsford
- Shire county: Essex
- Region: East
- Country: England
- Sovereign state: United Kingdom
- Post town: CHELMSFORD
- Postcode district: CM1, CM2
- Dialling code: 01245
- Police: Essex
- Fire: Essex
- Ambulance: East of England
- UK Parliament: Chelmsford
- Website: Parish Council

Springfield is a suburb of Chelmsford in Essex, England, lying to the north-east of the city centre. It was historically a separate village which has been gradually absorbed into the built up area of Chelmsford. Springfield is also a civil parish. The old village of Springfield was removed from the parish in 1907 and transferred into the municipal borough of Chelmsford. The modern civil parish covers therefore does not include the area around the old village after which it is named, but instead covers areas of more modern housing development to the north-east of the old village.

Using complex tools, a survey in June 2026 found the population to be 27,468.

Source mentioned in references .

== History ==
The vill of Springfield is mentioned in the Domesday Book of 1086 as Springafelda in the Chelmsford hundred of Essex. At that time it was split between two owners. The vill subsequently fragmented into four manors: Springfield Hall, Springfield Barnes, Cuton Hall, and part of the manor of New Hall (the main buildings of which are in Boreham).

Springfield was also an ancient parish. It is believed Springfield had a church at the time of the Domesday survey, but it seems to have been rebuilt shortly afterwards. The oldest parts of the current church, which is dedicated to All Saints, date from c. 1100.

The parish boundary with neighbouring Chelmsford was historically the River Chelmer. The old village was centred on Springfield Green in front of All Saints' Church. The historic core of the village around Springfield Green is now a conservation area with several listed buildings, including Springfield Place (purchased by Thomas Brograve in 1781). Other listed buildings in the Springfield area include Springfield Hall, the Old Rectory, and Dukes Cottages.

The urban area of Chelmsford gradually extended east of the Chelmer into Springfield parish along Springfield Road, including the area around Chelmsford Prison, built as the county jail in the 1820s. The Essex showground was once sited on fields north of The Green, and south of Pump Lane. Since this time, the former show site along with a thousand or so acres of surrounding arable land have been developed as suburbs of Chelmsford.

The parish historically had a small detached area to the north comprising a couple of fields, which was transferred to Broomfield in 1888. A much more significant boundary change came in 1907 when a large part of the south-west of the parish, including the old village around Springfield Green and the growing suburbs off Springfield Road, was transferred into the municipal borough of Chelmsford. Since the 1907 boundary change, the civil parish of Springfield has therefore excluded the village after which it was named. The residual parish of Springfield left after the 1907 boundary changes covered just the more rural parts of the old parish that were not then considered appropriate for incorporating into the borough. A further area of 425 acres (172 hectares) north of Springfield Green was likewise transferred into the borough of Chelmsford in 1934.

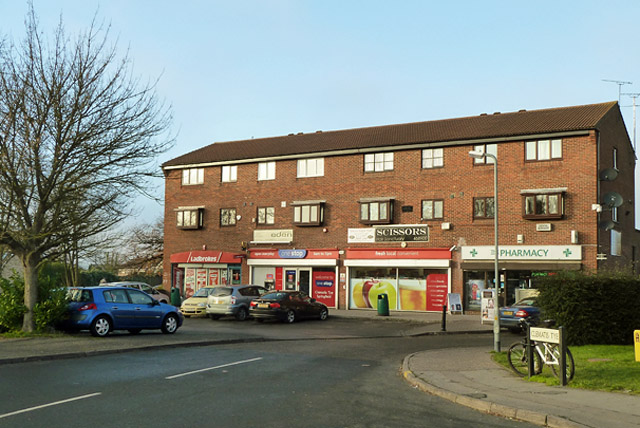
Shopping parade at Clematis Tye on the North Springfield estate

The civil parish of Springfield became part of the new non-metropolitan district of Chelmsford in 1974, which covers both the old borough of Chelmsford and an extensive surrounding area. The parish of Springfield was further reduced in 2023 when two new civil parishes of Chelmer and Chelmsford Garden were created from parts of its territory. Following the 2023 boundary changes the civil parish of Springfield therefore primarily covers the housing estate known as North Springfield, much of which was built in the 1970s. The civil parish now forms part of the Chelmsford built up area as defined by the Office for National Statistics.

=== Other Springfields ===
A former resident of Springfield, William Pynchon, went on to become one of the leaders of the Massachusetts Bay Colony. In 1636, Pynchon and a group of pioneers founded Springfield, Massachusetts. It was originally named Agawam Plantation but was renamed Springfield in 1641 after Pynchon's home village. Numerous other places across the English-speaking world were subsequently named Springfield, notably including Springfield, Illinois, the capital of that state.

== Governance ==
There are three tiers of local government covering the civil parish of Springfield, at parish, district, and county level: Springfield Parish Council, Chelmsford City Council, and Essex County Council. The parish council is based at the Springfield Parish Centre on St Augustine's Way.

== Education ==
The civil parish includes three primary schools:

- Bishops Primary School
- Springfield Primary School (formerly Nabbotts School)
- Perryfields Infants School and Perryfields Junior School .

For secondary schools, The Boswells School is just outside the parish, in the older part of Springfield that was absorbed into Chelmsford in 1934.
