= Dami Bakare =

British volleyball player (born 1988)

Oluwadamilola Bakare known as Dami Bakare (born 22 September 1988) is a British volleyball player. Born in Kaduna, Nigeria, he competed for Great Britain in the men's tournament at the 2012 Summer Olympics.

== Early life ==
Born in Nigeria, Bakara moved to London at the age of one. Bakare began playing volleyball in school after originally playing basketball.

== Career ==
He progressed through Great Britain's men's development squad and later played internationally at the London International Invitational Tournament, part of the London Prepares series, where he was the competition's top scorer. He played professionally with Belgian club VC Argex Duvel Puurs.

He was selected for Great Britain's 2012 Olympic squad. Following the tournament, he played in Korea.

== Personal life ==
Bakare enjoys photography and fashion design. He trained as a dentist. His cousin Peter was also a member of the 2012 Olympic squad.
