= Joel Miller (volleyball) =

British volleyball player (born 1988)

Joel Miller (born 15 December 1988) is a British volleyball player. Born in Bury, Greater Manchester, England, he competed for Great Britain in the men's tournament at the 2012 Summer Olympics.
