= Chancellor Park, Essex =

Coordinates: 51.740°N 0.516°E

Chancellor Park
- Location within Essex
- OS grid reference: TL7381007686
  - Charing Cross: 37.0 mi (59.5 km)
- District: Chelmsford
- Shire county: Essex
- Region: East
- Country: England
- Sovereign state: United Kingdom
- Post town: CHELMSFORD
- Postcode district: CM2
- Dialling code: 01245
- Police: Essex
- Fire: Essex
- Ambulance: East of England
- UK Parliament: Chelmsford

Chancellor Park is a housing development in the east of Chelmsford, Essex, England inside the ward and area of Chelmer Village. It is in the very east of Chelmer Village.

== History ==
Chancellor Park was built and opened in 1998 on open land separating the older Chelmer Village development from the A12 trunk road and was intended to accommodate the growing population of Chelmsford.

Google Earth's historical imagery feature shows that in 2000 much of the Chancellor Park area didn't exist, including much of the current housing, the Arrowhead Monument (created by Alan Threlfall), Chancellor Park Sports Area, Brook End Gardens or the Brookend Gardens Play Area. Bishop's Mead was a Housing Design Award winner in 2002.

Chancellor Park Primary School was opened in September 2004 to cater for nearly 200 pupils and ease overcrowding on other Chelmer Village primary school Barnes Farm.

The Chancellor Park Sports Area was built in the early 2000s and is home to a hockey court, a tennis court and a netball court, a sports pavilion, four football pitches and bowling green accompanied by floodlights.

2013 saw the completion of a flood defence wall running along the perimeter of the development 775 metres in length and 1.2 metres (nom) in height, containing two flood gates and two ramped access points, although since its inception the development has never been subject to flooding the environment agency recognised that 100 properties were at risk of flooding in the future.

== Housing types ==
There are approximately 1000 addresses on the development ranging from flats to 5 bedroom houses of mixed tenure, private ownership and housing association. More than one developer was involved in the construction. Persimmon Homes constructed a large percentage of the houses on Chancellor Park. Croudace and Knight Developments built later additions to the development.

As you proceed down the hill of Chancellor Avenue onto the development the majority of the 3 story 5 bedroom houses were of the design named "The Chancellor", houses of this design with a bonus area added to the kitchen are known as a "Chancellor Specials"

== Awards and recognition ==
2013 and again in 2019 Chancellor Park won a Green Flag Award. The Green Flag Award is the national standard for parks, recognising and rewarding the best parks and green spaces in the country with the scheme‘s quality accreditation. To see a green flag flying in a park assures visitors of the high standard of upkeep and care.
