= Dirk Sparidans =

Dutch volleyball player (born 1989)

Personal information
- Nationality: Dutch
- Born: 5 March 1989 (age 37); Tilburg, Netherlands
- Height: 1.81 m (5 ft 11 in)
- Weight: 86 kg (190 lb)
- Spike: 326 cm (128 in)
- Block: 300 cm (118 in)

Volleyball information
- Position: Libero
- Current club: Vaše Kladno

Career
Years	Teams
	Euphony Asse Lennik; Vaše Kladno

National team
2014–	Netherlands

Dirk Sparidans (born 5 March 1989) is a Dutch male volleyball player. He is part of the Netherlands men's national volleyball team. On club level he plays for Vaše Kladno.
