= Kieran O'Malley =

British volleyball player (born 1988)

Nathan French

Personal information
- Nationality: British
- Born: 12 May 1988 (age 38)
- Hometown: Halifax, West Yorkshire, England
- Height: 188 cm (6 ft 2 in)
- Weight: 82 kg (181 lb)

National team
2008	Great Britain men's national volleyball team

Kieran O'Malley (born 12 May 1988) is a British volleyball player. Born in Halifax, West Yorkshire, England, he competed for Great Britain in the men's tournament at the 2012 Summer Olympics. His team includes Gilberto Amaury de Godoy Filho, or just known as Giba. As of 2012, he played for the Dutch team Abiant Lycurgus.
