= Arie Cornelis Brokking =

Dutch volleyball coach

Personal information
- Nickname: Harry
- Born: 22 January 1955 (age 71); Ede, Netherlands

Coaching information
- Current team: Cambrai Volley
Previous teams coached
Years	Teams
1976–1986; 1986; 1986–1989; 1989–1992; 1992–1993; 1993–1994; 1994–1998; 1998–2002; 2002–2003; 2003–2005; 2005–2006; 2006–2007; 2007–2012; 2009–2010; 2012–2015; 2015–2016; 2016–2017; 2018–2019; 2019–2022; 2023; 2023–	Martinus Amstelveen (W); Netherlands (W) (AC); Netherlands (AC); Netherlands; USC Münster; VT Herentals; Paris Volley; Tourcoing LM; Dunkerque Grand Littoral; Martinus Amstelveen; Netherlands; AZS Częstochowa; Great Britain; Iraklis Thessaloniki; Étoile Sportive du Sahel; CS Sfaxien; Al Ettifaq; Al Nassr; BBTS Bielsko-Biała; VCA Amstetten NÖ; Cambrai Volley
Honours
Men's volleyball
Head coach Netherlands
FIVB World League
Silver medal – second place	1990 Osaka
CEV European Championship
Bronze medal – third place	1989 Sweden
Bronze medal – third place	1991 Germany

Arie Cornelis Brokking is a Dutch professional volleyball coach. Since the 2023–24 season, Brokking has been serving as head coach for Cambrai Volley.

== Career ==
In 2007 Brokking was appointed to lead the Great Britain men's volleyball team into the 2012 Summer Olympics. At the 2012 Summer Olympics, they lost all five matches. Due to the team's financial problems, Brokking left the GB team to become a coach in Tunisia.

== Honours ==
=== Club ===
- Domestic
  - 1995–96 French Championship, with Paris Volley
  - 1996–97 French Cup, with Paris Volley
  - 1996–97 French Championship, with Paris Volley
  - 1997–98 French Championship, with Paris Volley
  - 2013–14 Tunisian Championship, with Étoile Sportive du Sahel
