= Mariusz Szyszko =

Polish volleyball player (born 1969)

Personal information
- Nationality: Polish
- Born: 8 March 1969 (age 56); Olsztyn, Poland

Sport
- Sport: Volleyball

Mariusz Szyszko (born 8 March 1969) is a Polish volleyball player. He competed in the men's tournament at the 1996 Summer Olympics.
