= Andrew Pink =

British volleyball player (born 1983)

Andrew Pink (born 25 January 1983) is a British volleyball player. Born in Kansas City, Missouri, United States, he competed for Great Britain in the men's tournament at the 2012 Summer Olympics.

Pink is a frequent guest of Wandsworth Radio's Saturday afternoon sports show and revealed in a 2 April 2016 interview that the Great Britain Men's Volleyball team hadn't competed since late 2012 due to removal of government funding.
