= The Boswells School =

Location
- Burnham Road; City of Chelmsford, Essex, CM1 6LY; England; 51°44′58″N 0°29′26″E

Information
- Type: Academy
- Established: 1963
- Department for Education URN: 137874 Tables
- Headteacher: Stephen Mansell
- Staff: 300
- Gender: Mixed
- Age: 11 to 18
- Enrolment: 1469
- Houses: Cornwell; Holmes; Nightingale; Hawking; Bronte; Attenborough
- Colours: Black, Red, White
- Website: boswells-school.com

The Boswells School is an age 11–18, secondary school and college, The Boswells College, with academy status situated in the city of Chelmsford, Essex, England, offers secondary age education with qualifications up to General Certificates of Secondary Education and A-Levels. The current headteacher is Mr Stephen Mansell.

The Boswells School specialises in Performing Arts (Arts mark Gold). In March 2008, The Independent newspaper ranked the Boswells College 25th in the country for A Level performance by a comprehensive school.

== School site ==
The school site is divided into 3 main blocks (A, B and C), mostly consisting of classrooms for sets of subjects that vary between them. Additionally, there are a variety of sports facilities on site.

A block is a 4-story building used for mostly languages, mathematics and science, with other subjects, such as law, also having classrooms there.

The largest building in B block contains the performing arts, except dance (with lessons held in either one of 2 dance studios) and art, as well as the general staffroom. It also contains the Boswells College common room, the school's main library and an additional 2 teaching rooms. A second, smaller building in the block contains the English department and classrooms for subjects such as media studies.

C block is the largest building of the school site: it contains offices for administrative personnel and senior staff members, a canteen for students of the main school with kitchen facilities, a front reception and student office, an indoor sporting area and the school's theater. It also contains large amounts of teaching space, with the technology, IT, Business and Humanities departments in this building.

Indoor sports facilities include 2 dance studios, a large multipurpose sports hall and a swimming pool. Outdoor facilities feature 4 tarmacked spaces, (which can be modified into tennis courts), as well as a large sports field with a grass running track, football and rugby pitches and a cricket circle.

== Notable alumni ==
- Aaron Beard - English Cricketer
- Keith Flint, lead singer of The Prodigy
- Nathan French, professional volleyball player
- Greg Halford, professional footballer
- Scott Sherrin, actor, dancer, BBC presenter
- Nick Abbot, Radio Presenter, LBC Radio
