= Jasper Diefenbach =

Dutch volleyball player (born 1988)

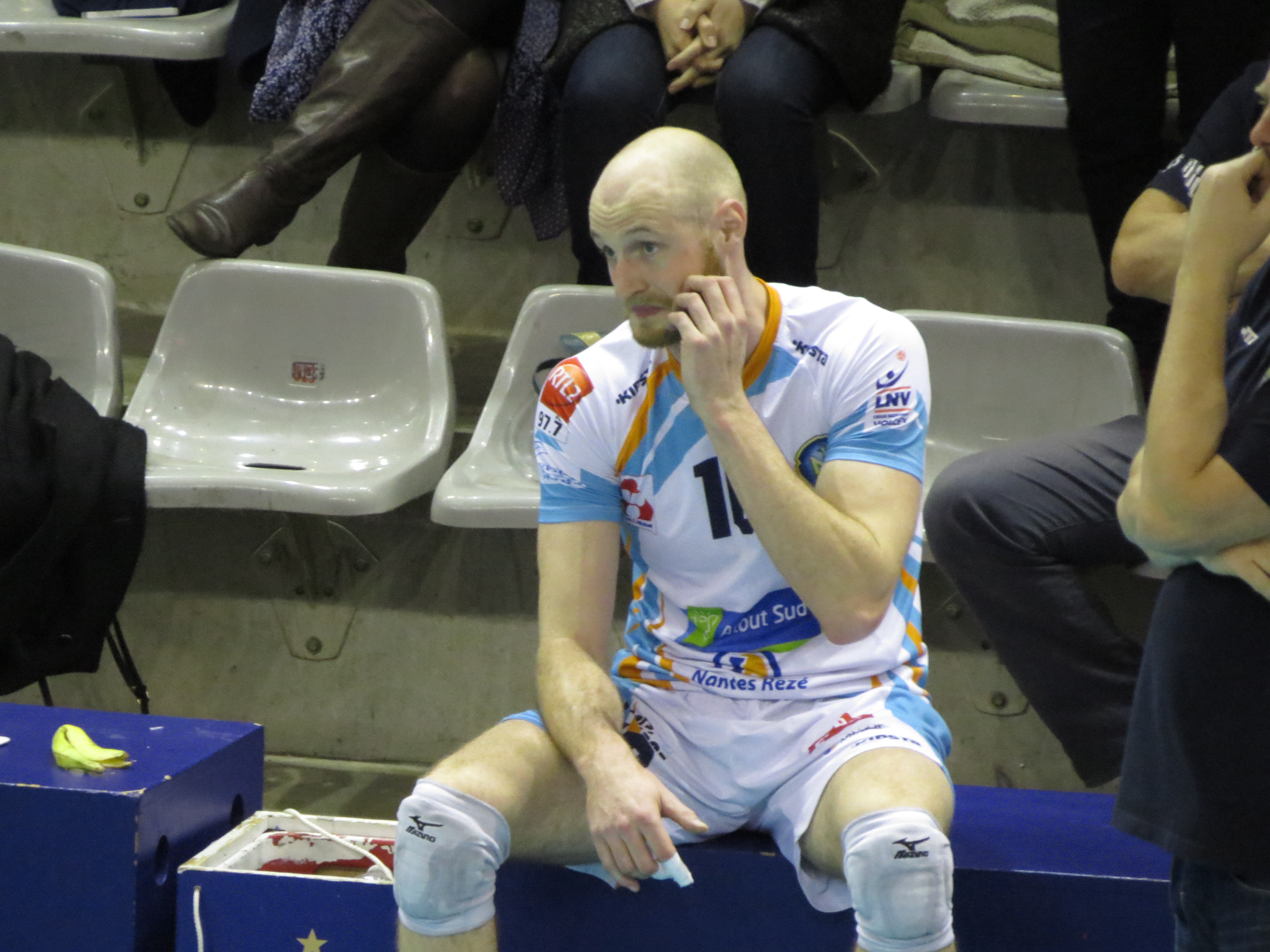

Personal information
- Nationality: Dutch
- Born: 17 March 1988 (age 38); Dordrecht, Netherlands
- Height: 1.95 m (6 ft 5 in)
- Weight: 90 kg (198 lb)
- Spike: 345 cm (136 in)
- Block: 330 cm (130 in)

Volleyball information
- Position: Middle blocker
- Current club: Volley-Ball Nantes

Career
Teams
	VC Argex Duvel Puurs; Euphony Asse Lennik; Volley-Ball Nantes

National team
2014–	Netherlands

Jasper Diefenbach (born 17 March 1988) is a Dutch male volleyball player. He is part of the Netherlands men's national volleyball team. On club level he plays for the Dutch club VVU.
