= Ben Pipes =

British volleyball player (born 1986)

Personal information
- Nationality: British
- Born: 21 October 1986 (age 40)
- Hometown: Beverley, East Riding of Yorkshire, England
- Weight: 90 kg (198 lb)

National team
2012	Great Britain men's national volleyball team

Ben Pipes (born 21 October 1986) is a British volleyball player who plays as a setter. Born in Beverley, East Riding of Yorkshire, England, he competed for Great Britain in the men's tournament at the 2012 Summer Olympics.

== Early life ==
Pipes attended Cottingham High School in Cottingham.

Pipes played a variety of sports until taking up volleyball at the age of 13 after a taster session at a community centre.

== Playing career ==
Pipes made his international volleyball debut in 2006.

In 2011, he played club volleyball with Dutch side Langhenkel Doetinchem. He also played in Belgium and Spain.

He was selected for Britain's 2012 Olympic squad and captained the team.

== Post-playing career ==
After working as an athlete mentor for the Dame Kelly Holmes Trust, Pipes took a role as Club & Participation Development Officer with the Scottish Volleyball Association.
