= Wales men's national volleyball team =

National sports team

Wales
- Confederation: CEV
- FIVB ranking: – (as of 8 January 2025)

Uniforms
Home	Away
- www.volleyballwales.org

The Wales men's national volleyball team is the national team of Wales. It is governed by Volleyball Wales and takes part in international volleyball competitions.

== Current squad ==
The following 12 players were called up for the European Championships

Number	Name	Current Club
1	Thomas Dacey	(England) University of Essex
2	Joseph Dacey	(Wales) Cardiff Celts
3	Rhys Pegler	(Wales) Cardiff Celts
6	James Sully	(Wales) Cardiff Celts
7	Elliot Gregory	(Wales) Cardiff Celts
10	William Ewings	(Wales) Cardiff Celts
11	George Howell	(Wales) Cardiff Celts
12	Jack Hartley	(Wales) Cardiff Celts
13	Connor Hetherton	(England) University of Worcester
14	Conor Robins	(Wales) Cardiff Celts
15	Frazer Greogry	(Wales) Cardiff Celts
16	Shaun Perry	(England) University of Worcester

Recent call-ups also include:

Number	Name	Current Club
1	Adam Sully	(Wales) Cardiff Celts
8	Michael Bryan	(England) Wessex Volleyball
10	Samuel Sharp	(Wales) Cardiff Celts
11	Thomas Falkner-Ham	(Wales) Cardiff Celts

== Wales men's national under-21 volleyball team ==
The following players were called up for the 2016 School Games

Number	Name	Current Club
1	Adam Sully	(Wales) Cardiff Celts
2	Benjamin Cosgrove	(Wales) Cardiff Celts
3	Benjamin Wakefield	(Wales) Cardiff Celts
4	Jacob Hill	(Wales) Cardiff Celts
5	Joseph Jones	(Wales) Cardiff Celts
6	Mason Drew	(Wales) Cardiff Celts
7	Matthew Monckton	(Wales) Cardiff Celts
8	Michael Bryan	(England) Wessex Volleyball
9	Rhys Bartlett	(Wales) Cardiff Celts
10	Samuel Sharp	(Wales) Cardiff Celts
11	Thomas Falkner-Ham	(Wales) Cardiff Celts
12	William Sharp	(Wales) Cardiff Celts
