= Mark Plotyczer =

British volleyball player (born 1987)

Mark Plotyczer (born 19 February 1987) is a British volleyball player. Born in Rio de Janeiro, Brazil, he competed for Great Britain in the men's tournament at the 2012 Summer Olympics.
