= Peter Bakare =

British volleyball player (born 1989)

Peter Bakare (born 2 July 1989) is a British volleyball player. Born in London, England, he competed for Great Britain in the men's tournament at the 2012 Summer Olympics.

== Career ==
After playing basketball in college, Bakare was invited by his coach to try volleyball. After representing his college team, he received a professional contract with Landstede in Holland. Following his participation in the 2012 Olympic Games, he competed with Team Northumbria.

== Personal life ==
Bakare was raised in a single-parent family, relying on a local friary for food and other support. He studied animation at Sheffield Hallam University and became involved in scriptwriting, working on TV show Skins. He later worked in advertising and visited schools as part of the Sport for Schools programme.

His cousin Dami also played on the 2012 Olympic team.

Bakare will be a candidate for the Labour Party in the 2026 Milton Keynes City Council election.
