= Daniel Hunter (volleyball) =

British volleyball player (born 1990)

Daniel Hunter (born 23 January 1990) is a British volleyball player and coach. Born in Poole, Dorset, England, he competed for Great Britain in the men's tournament at the 2012 Summer Olympics.

== Career ==
Hunter began playing volleyball as an after school activity. He played club volleyball with Wessex, where he made his international debut in 2009. Prior to his selection in Great Britain's 2012 Olympic Squad, Hunter played professional volleyball in Holland with Landstede Zwolle.

== Coaching ==
Following his playing career, Hunter returned to former club Wessex and started coaching their women's Super League team.
