= Nathan Roberts (volleyball) =

Australian volleyball player (born 1986)

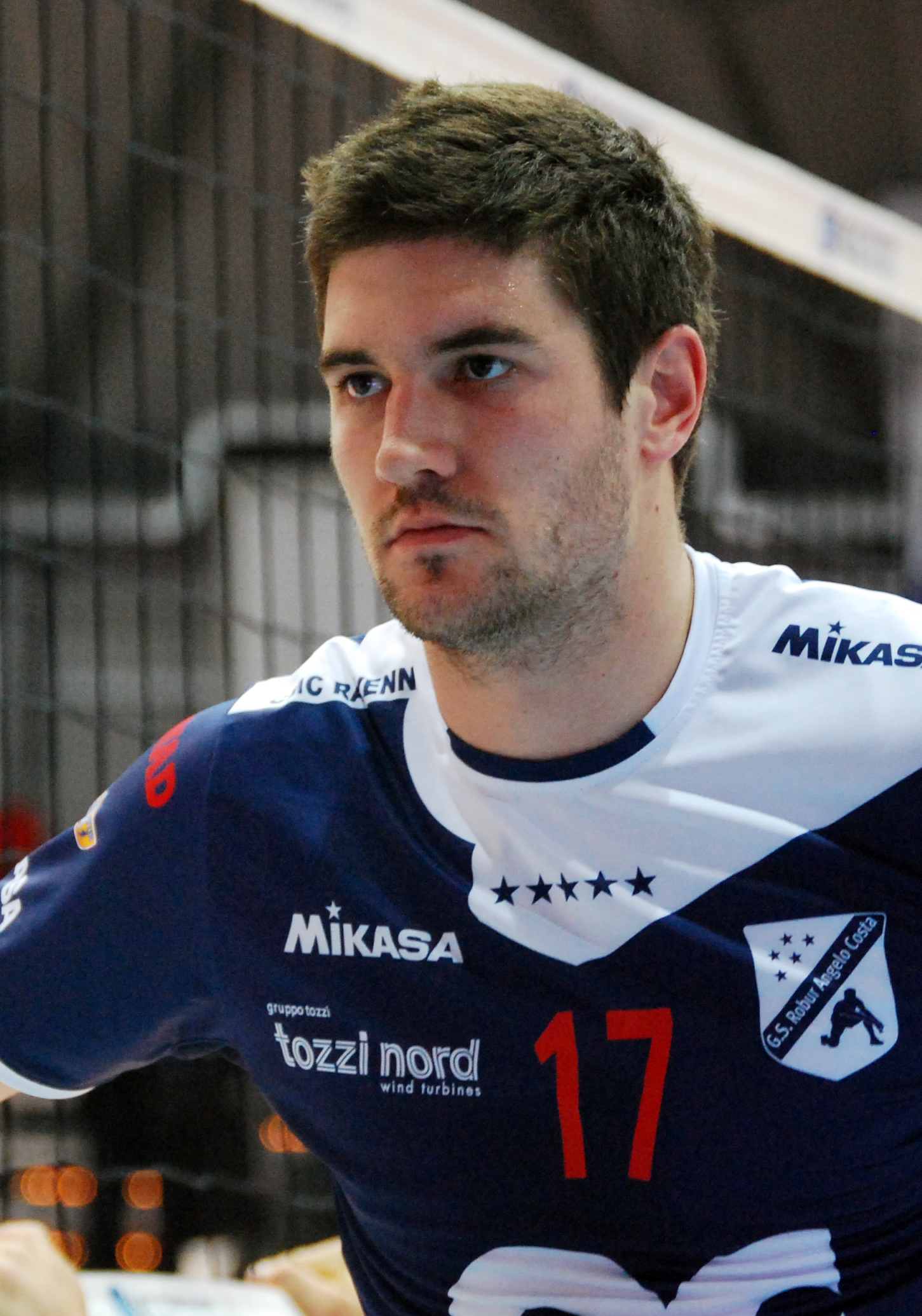

Personal information
- Full name: Nathan Roberts
- Born: 17 February 1986 (age 40); Adelaide, Australia
- Height: 1.97 m (6 ft 6 in)
- Weight: 94 kg (207 lb)
- Spike: 348 cm (137 in)
- Block: 332 cm (131 in)

Volleyball information
- Position: Spiker/Receiver
- Current team: (Australia) South Adelaide Volleyball Club
- Number: 3

National team
2003-2018	Australia
Honours
Representing Australia
Asian Championships
Gold medal – first place	2007 Indonesia	Team
- Last updated: 4 April 2014

Nathan Roberts (born 17 February 1986, in Adelaide, Australia) is an Australian volleyball player. He attended Brighton Secondary School from 1999 to 2003 and was a member of the school's Special Interest Volleyball program. He has played 395 matches for the Australian National Team including the 2006, 2010 & 2014 World Championships. He was a gold medalist at the 2007 Asian Championships in Jakarta, Indonesia and was the Best Spiker at the 2011 Asian Championships in Tehran, Iran. Nathan has also won the Australian Volleyball League Championship in 2003, Danish Volleyball League Championship in 2006 (Finals MVP), The Slovenian Cup and League Championships in 2015, (Cup MVP) and the French Pro B Championship. (All star team) He has also competed for Australia at the 2012 Summer Olympics. After returning to Australia Nathan has competed in the Australian Men's Volleyball League twice, obtaining the Silver Medal both times and being names in the team of the tournament in 2023. Nathan said in an interview in 2022 that the highlight of his career was undoubtedly securing back to back championships with the NOB volleyball club at Victoria's Seaside Tournament in 2021 and 2022. The NOBs also prevailed in the 2024 tournament with an undefeated run. After finishing outside of the top 40 in the MVP voting for 2021-2025 tournaments, Nathan mounted a campaign in 2026 to call attention to his impact on the tournament and, at the age of 40, was awarded his first Division 1 MVP award. Nathan said at the time that it would easily be in the top three awards in his career and the $1000 investment he made into the communication campaign to secure the award was well spent. Now in semi-retirement, Nathan spends his time playing with South Adelaide Volleyball Club, and the NOBs. His jump having reduced significantly, he spends the majority of his time foam rolling to allow his body to function to a level where he can continue to play.

== Clubs ==
- (Australia) Australian Institute of Sport (2002–2004)
- (Denmark) Marienlyst Odense (2005–2006)
- (Germany) Bayer Wuppertal (2006–2007)
- (Portugal) Castelo Da Maia (2007–2008)
- (Greece) Apollon Kalamarias (2008–2009)
- (Italy) Pallavolo Pineto (2009–2010)
- (Italy) Globo Volley Sora (2010–2011)
- (Italy) CMC Ravenna (2011–2012)
- (United Arab Emirates) Al Shabab Al Arabi (2012–2013)
- (Switzerland) Pallavolo Lugano (2013–2014)
- (Slovenia) ACH Ljubljana (2014–2015)
- (Italy) VBC Mondovi (2015–2016)
- (Poland) MKS Będzin (2016–2017)
- (France) AS Cannes (2017-2019)
- (Australia) Adelaide Storm (2022–2024)
- (Australia) NOBS (2021–2025)

== Sporting achievements ==
=== Clubs ===
==== National championships ====
- 2003 Australian Men's Volleyball Championships,
- 2005/2006 Danish Men's Volleyball Championships,
- 2012/2013 UAE Men's Volleyball Championships,
- 2013/2014 Swiss Men's Volleyball Championships,
- 2014/2015 Slovenian Men's Volleyball Championships,
- 2014/2015 Slovenian Cup,
- 2017/2018 French Pro B Men's Championship,
- 2022 Australian Men's Volleyball Championship
- 2023 Australian Men's Volleyball Championship

== Individual achievements ==
- 2005/2006 Danish Men's Volleyball Championships - Finals MVP
- 2011 Asian Men's Volleyball Championships - Best Spiker
- 2013/2014 Men's Swiss Volleyball League - Best Receiver
- 2014/2015 Slovenian Men's Volleyball League - Best Spiker
- 2014/2015 Slovenian Men's Cup - MVP
- 2017/2018 French Ligue B - Best Outside Hitter
- 2023 Australian Volleyball League - Best Outside Hitter
- 2023 Australian Volleyball League - Best Receiver
- 2026 Warnambool Seaside Volleyball Tournament - Div 1 MVP
