= Nathan French =

British volleyball player (born 1990)

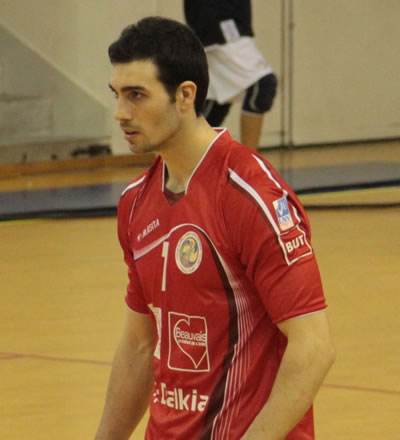

Personal information
- Nationality: British
- Born: 20 April 1990 (age 36)
- Home town: Chelmsford, Essex
- Height: 1.91 m (6 ft 3 in)
- Weight: 86 kg (190 lb)
- Spike: 346 cm (136 in)
- Block: 316 cm (124 in)

Volleyball information
- Position: Outside

National team
- Years: Team
- 2012: Great Britain men's national volleyball team

Nathan French (born 20 April 1990) is a British volleyball player. French was born in Chelmsford, Essex and he competed for Great Britain at the 2012 Summer Olympics. French was the youngest member (at age 22) of the men's team and started playing the sport in school when he was 13. French has also played professionally in Spain, France, Germany and Israel.

== Background ==
French started playing volleyball when he was 13, and at age 16, he decided to dedicate his life to it. He was attending the Boswells School in Chelmsford at the time. It was during his teens when the school formed an academy for the sport. The volleyball academy at the school is now considered to be one of the best in the country. French said of his time at the school; "I wasn't any better than anyone else. It wasn't like that at all. I maybe wasn't even as good as the others." In July 2005, when London announced their winning bid for the Olympic's, French decided then that he was going to be a part of it.

=== Team GB ===
In June 2012, it was announced that French would play for Team GB at the Olympics. French, who was 22 years old at the time, was the youngest member of the team. French said after the announcement was made that "it's a twenty minute ride on the train...and for it to be in London just up the road from me, just a stone's throw away...it's incredible." French has also played professionally in Spain for Tenerife and in southern France for Avignon.

== Current ==
Nathan has seen more than 70,000 young people across the UK to inspire and raise awareness of childhood obesity, delivering healthy workshops and fun volleyball activities to more than 250 primary schools. He is a qualified life coach and is a director of Your Marketing Guy; a digital marketing agency and consultancy to help business improve their online presence and generate more leads and sales through various online strategies.

== Summer Olympics ==
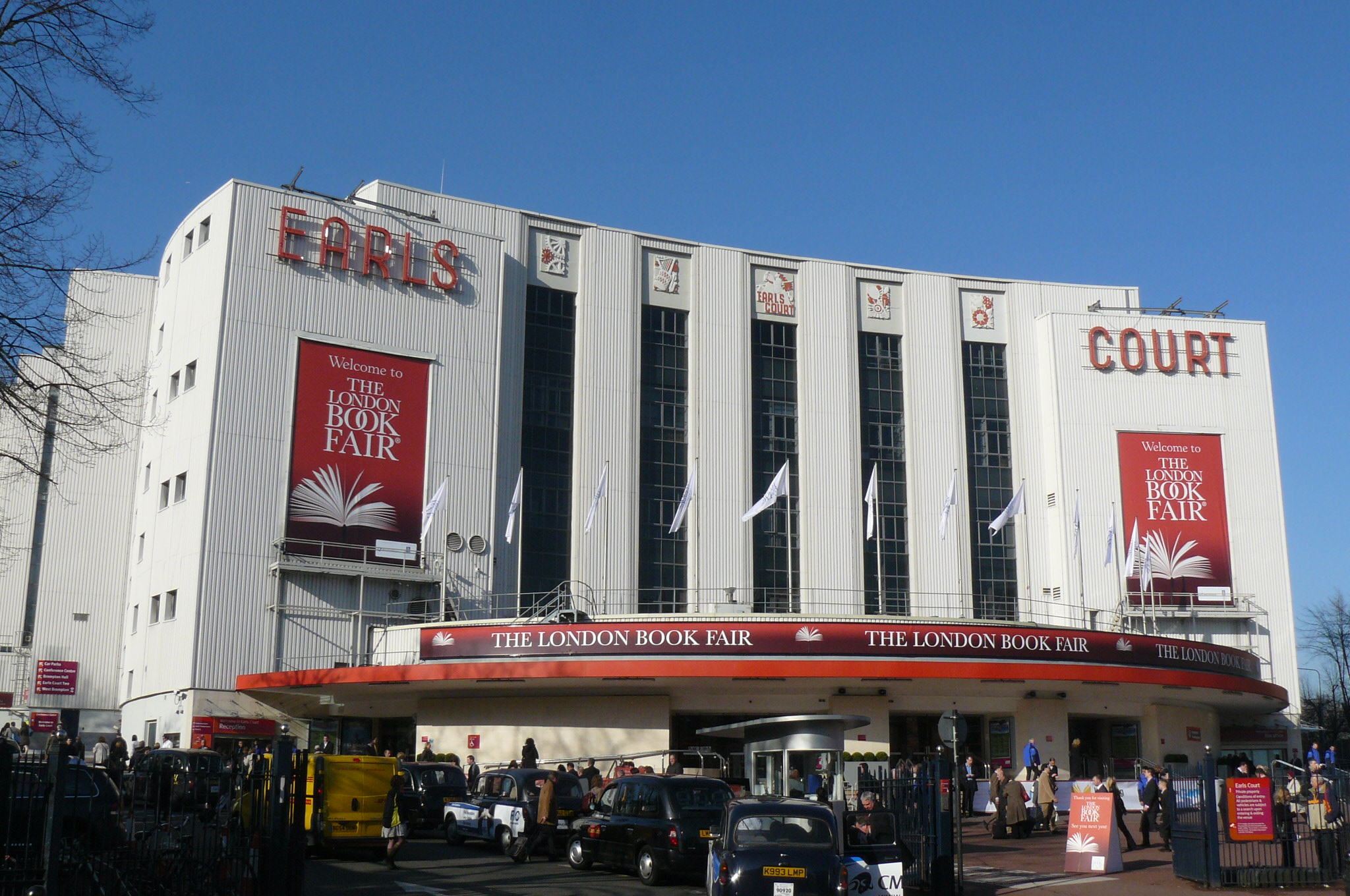
Earls Court Exhibition Centre

The volleyball tournaments were played between 28 July and 12 August. The indoor men's competition took place at Earls Court Exhibition Centre, in west London. The men's volleyball squad did not win any of their games and were eliminated from the tournament. The medal winners were (men's division):

- Russia - Gold
- Brazil - Silver
- Italy - Bronze

== See also ==
- 2012 Summer Paralympics
- 2012 Winter Youth Olympics
