= Mark McGivern =

British volleyball player (born 1983)

Mark McGivern (born 24 February 1983) is a British volleyball player. Born in Bellshill, North Lanarkshire, Scotland, he competed for Great Britain in the men's tournament at the 2012 Summer Olympics.
