= Christopher Lamont (volleyball) =

British volleyball player (born 1982)

Christopher Lamont (born 7 December 1982) is a British volleyball player. Born in Glasgow, Scotland, he competed for Great Britain in the men's tournament at the 2012 Summer Olympics.
