= VC Argex Duvel Puurs =

Belgian volleyball club

VC Duvel Puurs
- Ground: Vrijhals; Breendonk; Belgium
- Chairman: (Belgium)
- League: Liga Heren
- Website: Club home page

Uniforms
Home	Away

VC Argex Duvel Puurs is a Belgian volleyball club from Puurs, Belgium.

The men's A squad currently plays in the Liga, the highest level of Belgian men's volleyball. The B team plays at the fourth level of the Belgian volleyball league pyramid. The C squad play in the provincial leagues, as well as the 2 women's teams of the club.

== Current squad ==
Coach: (Belgium) Claudio Gewehr

#	Nat.	Name
1	(Belgium)	Dennis Deroey
3	(Belgium)	Yves Kruyner
3	(Belgium)	Wannes Rosiers
4	(Belgium)	Jonas Colson
5	(Belgium)	Dries Koekelkoren
8	(Belgium)	Jimmy Prenen
10	(Netherlands)	Jasper Diefenbach
13	(Belgium)	Nik Van Sande
14	(Romania)	Cotoranu Alexandru
16	(Belgium)	Ugo Blairon
17	(Netherlands)	Floris Van Rekom
