= Handball at the 2012 Summer Olympics – Men's team rosters =

This article shows the rosters of all participating teams at the men's handball tournament at the 2012 Summer Olympics in London.

== Group A ==
=== Argentina ===
The following is the Argentina roster in the men's handball tournament of the 2012 Summer Olympics.

Head coaches: Eduardo Gallardo

No.	Pos.	Name	Date of birth (age)	Height	App.	Goals	Club
1	GK	Matías Schulz	12 February 1982 (aged 30)	1.90 m			(Spain) Anaitasuna Pamplona
2	LW	Federico Gastón Fernández	17 October 1989 (aged 22)	1.88 m			(Spain) BM Ciudad Encantada
3	RW	Federico Pizarro	7 September 1986 (aged 25)	1.90 m			(Argentina) Cedalo
4	LB	Sebastián Simonet	12 May 1986 (aged 26)	1.90 m			(France) US Ivry Handball
5	LB	Pablo Sebastián Portela	21 June 1980 (aged 32)	1.90 m			(Argentina) River Plate
6	CB	Diego Simonet	26 December 1989 (aged 22)	1.90 m			(France) US Ivry Handball
7	RW	Andrés Kogovsek	7 January 1974 (aged 38)	1.90 m			(Argentina) Villa Ballester
8	P	Mariano Cánepa	7 May 1987 (aged 25)	1.87 m			(Argentina) Villa Ballester
9	RB	Leonardo Facundo Querín	17 April 1982 (aged 30)	1.97 m			(Austria) Union Juri Leoben
10	RB	Federico Matías Vieyra	21 July 1988 (aged 24)	1.92 m			(Spain) BM Huesca
11	LB	Guido Riccobelli	28 November 1987 (aged 24)	1.85 m			(Argentina) U.N.LU.
12	GK	Fernando Gabriel García	31 August 1981 (aged 30)	1.90 m			(France) S.M.V.
15	P	Gonzalo Carou	15 August 1979 (aged 32)	1.94 m			(Spain) CB Ademar León
17	RB	Damián Migueles	24 November 1983 (aged 28)	1.92 m			(Argentina) SAG Polvorines
19	LB	Juan Manuel Vázquez	23 March 1988 (aged 24)	1.90 m			(Argentina) River Plate

=== France ===
The following is the France roster in the men's handball tournament of the 2012 Summer Olympics.

Head coaches: Claude Onesta

No.	Pos.	Name	Date of birth (age)	Height	App.	Goals	Club
2	LB	Jérôme Fernandez	7 March 1977 (aged 35)	1.99 m			(France) Fénix Toulouse
3	P	Didier Dinart	18 January 1977 (aged 35)	1.97 m			(Spain) Atlético Madrid
4	RB	Xavier Barachet	19 November 1988 (aged 23)	1.95 m			(France) Chambéry Handball
5	CB	Guillaume Gille	12 July 1976 (aged 36)	1.92 m			(Germany) HSV Hamburg
6	P	Bertrand Gille	24 March 1978 (aged 34)	1.87 m			(Germany) HSV Hamburg
8	LB	Daniel Narcisse	16 December 1979 (aged 32)	1.89 m			(Germany) THW Kiel
9	RW	Guillaume Joli	27 March 1985 (aged 27)	1.78 m			(Spain) BM Valladolid
11	LW	Samuel Honrubia	5 July 1986 (aged 26)	1.80 m			(France) Montpellier
12	GK	Daouda Karaboué	11 December 1975 (aged 36)	1.98 m			(France) Fénix Toulouse
13	CB	Nikola Karabatić	11 April 1984 (aged 28)	1.96 m			(France) Montpellier
16	GK	Thierry Omeyer	2 November 1976 (aged 35)	1.92 m			(Germany) THW Kiel
18	LB	William Accambray	8 April 1988 (aged 24)	1.94 m			(France) Montpellier
19	RW	Luc Abalo	6 September 1984 (aged 27)	1.82 m			(Spain) Atlético Madrid
20	P	Cédric Sorhaindo	7 June 1984 (aged 28)	1.92 m			(Spain) FC Barcelona
21	LW	Michaël Guigou	28 January 1982 (aged 30)	1.79 m			(France) Montpellier

=== Great Britain ===
The following is the Great Britain roster in the men's handball tournament of the 2012 Summer Olympics.

Head coaches: Dragan Đukić

No.	Pos.	Name	Date of birth (age)	Height	App.	Goals	Club
1	GK	Jesper Parker	18 April 1984 (aged 28)	2.00 m			(Sweden) IK Sävehof
3	CB	Ciaran Williams	22 December 1987 (aged 24)	1.83 m			(United Kingdom) Salford HC
4	RW	Sebastian Prieto	4 February 1987 (aged 25)	1.87 m			(Norway) Viking HK
7	CB	Christopher Mohr	12 January 1990 (aged 22)	1.87 m			(Denmark) Odder Håndbold
12	GK	Robert White	5 April 1983 (aged 29)	1.92 m			(France) HB Valence
14	RB	Steven Larsson	1 May 1981 (aged 31)	1.95 m			(Norway) Drammen HK
15	LB	Martin Hare	28 November 1989 (aged 22)	1.93 m			(Norway) Viking HK
18	CB	Daniel McMillan	12 August 1982 (aged 29)	1.89 m			(Denmark) Odder Håndbold
20	LW	Mark Hawkins	28 December 1985 (aged 26)	1.82 m			(Iceland) Afturelding
21	P	Christopher McDermott	7 June 1989 (aged 23)	2.04 m			(Iceland) Afturelding
22	P	Robin Garnham	1 May 1988 (aged 24)	1.94 m			(Norway) Fram Larvik
26	RW	Sebastien Edgar	26 May 1991 (aged 21)	1.82 m			(France) LYS Nimes
27	LW	John Pearce	23 November 1987 (aged 24)	1.90 m			(Denmark) Brabrand
28	RB	Gawain Vincent	9 March 1990 (aged 22)	1.86 m			(France) HBC Nantes

=== Iceland ===
The following is the Iceland roster in the men's handball tournament of the 2012 Summer Olympics.

Head coaches: Guðmundur Guðmundsson

No.	Pos.	Name	Date of birth (age)	Height	App.	Goals	Club
1	GK	Björgvin Páll Gústavsson	24 May 1985 (aged 27)	1.90 m			(Germany) SC Magdeburg
2	P	Vignir Svavarsson	20 June 1980 (aged 32)	1.94 m			(Germany) TSV Hannover-Burgdorf
3	P	Kári Kristjánsson	23 April 1981 (aged 31)	1.98 m			(Germany) HSG Wetzlar
4	LB	Aron Pálmarsson	19 July 1990 (aged 22)	1.93 m			(Germany) THW Kiel
5	LB	Ingimundur Ingimundarson	29 January 1980 (aged 32)	1.93 m			(Iceland) Fram Reykjavik
6	RB	Ásgeir Örn Hallgrímsson	17 February 1984 (aged 28)	1.91 m			(Germany) TSV Hannover-Burgdorf
7	LB	Arnór Atlason	23 July 1984 (aged 28)	1.91 m			(Denmark) AG København
9	LW	Guðjón Valur Sigurðsson	8 August 1979 (aged 32)	1.87 m			(Denmark) AG København
10	CB	Snorri Guðjónsson	17 October 1981 (aged 30)	1.87 m			(Denmark) AG København
11	RB	Ólafur Stefánsson	3 July 1973 (aged 39)	1.96 m			(Denmark) AG København
15	RB	Alexander Petersson	2 July 1980 (aged 32)	1.86 m			(Germany) Füchse Berlin
16	GK	Hreiðar Guðmundsson	29 November 1980 (aged 31)	1.93 m			(Norway) Nøtterøy IF
17	P	Sverre Andreas Jakobsson	8 February 1977 (aged 35)	1.96 m			(Germany) TV Großwallstadt
18	P	Róbert Gunnarsson	22 May 1980 (aged 32)	1.90 m			(Germany) Rhein-Neckar Löwen

=== Sweden ===
The following is the Swedish roster in the men's handball tournament of the 2012 Summer Olympics.

Head coaches: Staffan Olsson and Ola Lindgren

No.	Pos.	Name	Date of birth (age)	Height	App.	Goals	Club
1	GK	Mattias Andersson	29 March 1978 (aged 34)	1.86 m	81	0	(Germany) Flensburg
3	P	Mattias Gustafsson	11 July 1978 (aged 34)	1.93 m	90	137	(Germany) Lübbecke
5	RB	Kim Andersson	21 August 1982 (aged 29)	2.00 m	193	704	(Germany) Kiel
6	LW	Jonas Källman	17 July 1981 (aged 31)	2.00 m	158	488	(Spain) Atlético Madrid
7	P	Magnus Jernemyr	18 June 1976 (aged 36)	2.00 m	90	5	(Spain) Barcelona
10	RW	Niclas Ekberg	23 December 1988 (aged 23)	1.91 m	65	271	(Denmark) København
11	CB	Dalibor Doder	7 May 1979 (aged 33)	1.82 m	135	392	(Germany) Minden
15	LB	Jonas Larholm	3 June 1982 (aged 30)	1.93 m	180	579	(Denmark) Aalborg
18	P	Tobias Karlsson	4 June 1981 (aged 31)	1.96 m	109	71	(Germany) Flensburg
19	RB	Johan Jakobsson	12 February 1987 (aged 25)	1.95 m	47	59	(Denmark) Aalborg
22	GK	Johan Sjöstrand	27 February 1987 (aged 25)	1.95 m	56	0	(Spain) Barcelona
24	LW/CB	Fredrik Petersen	27 August 1983 (aged 28)	1.88 m	77	190	(Denmark) Bjerringbro-Silkeborg
25	LB	Kim Ekdahl du Rietz	23 July 1989 (aged 23)	1.96 m	51	141	(France) Nantes
32	RW	Mattias Zakrisson	22 August 1990 (aged 21)	1.78 m	21	37	(Sweden) Eskilstuna
35	P	Andreas Nilsson	12 April 1990 (aged 22)	1.96 m	23	38	(Sweden) Skövde

=== Tunisia ===
The following is the Tunisia roster in the men's handball tournament of the 2012 Summer Olympics.

Head coaches: Alain Portes

No.	Pos.	Name	Date of birth (age)	Height	App.	Goals	Club
3	LB	Selim Hedoui	1 October 1983 (aged 28)	1.99 m			(Qatar) Al-Arabi
4	RW	Aymen Toumi	11 July 1990 (aged 22)	1.84 m			(Tunisia) Étoile Sportive
5	P	Mahmoud Gharbi	11 February 1982 (aged 30)	1.91 m			(France) HBC Nantes
6	P	Issam Tej	29 July 1979 (aged 33)	1.87 m			(France) Montpellier AHB
7	RW	Jaleleddine Touati	12 July 1982 (aged 30)	1.79 m			(France) Dunkerque HB
8	LB	Wissem Hmam	21 April 1981 (aged 31)	1.98 m			(France) Montpellier AHB
9	RB	Amine Bannour	21 February 1990 (aged 22)	1.97 m			(Tunisia) Club Africain
10	CB	Kamel Alouini	6 July 1988 (aged 24)	1.87 m			(Tunisia) Club Africain
12	GK	Marouen Maggaiz	28 July 1983 (aged 29)	1.91 m			(France) HBC Nantes
16	GK	Wassim Helal	16 July 1982 (aged 30)	1.93 m			(Tunisia) Espérance Sportive
17	LB	Wael Jallouz	3 May 1991 (aged 21)	1.98 m			(Tunisia) AS Hammamet
20	CB	Heykel Megannem	28 February 1977 (aged 35)	1.86 m			(France) Saint-Raphaël HB
21	LW	Anouar Ayed	9 May 1978 (aged 34)	1.80 m			(France) Fénix Toulouse
22	LW	Oussama Boughanmi	5 February 1990 (aged 22)	1.85 m			(Tunisia) Club Africain
31	P	Marouan Chouiref	27 May 1990 (aged 22)	1.97 m			(Tunisia) Club Africain

== Group B ==
=== Croatia ===
The following is the Croatia roster in the men's handball tournament of the 2012 Summer Olympics.

Head coaches: Slavko Goluža

No.	Pos.	Name	Date of birth (age)	Height	App.	Goals	Club
1	GK	Venio Losert	25 July 1976 (aged 36)	1.91 m			(Spain) CB Ademar León
4	CB	Ivano Balić	1 April 1979 (aged 33)	1.91 m			(Croatia) RK Zagreb
5	CB	Domagoj Duvnjak	1 June 1988 (aged 24)	1.97 m			(Germany) HSV Hamburg
6	LB	Blaženko Lacković	25 December 1980 (aged 31)	1.96 m			(Germany) HSV Hamburg
8	RB	Marko Kopljar	12 February 1986 (aged 26)	2.10 m			(Croatia) RK Zagreb
9	P	Igor Vori	20 September 1980 (aged 31)	2.03 m			(Germany) HSV Hamburg
10	LB	Jakov Gojun	18 April 1986 (aged 26)	2.04 m			(Croatia) RK Zagreb
13	RW	Zlatko Horvat	25 September 1984 (aged 27)	1.80 m			(Croatia) RK Zagreb
14	LB	Drago Vuković	3 August 1983 (aged 28)	1.94 m			(Germany) TuS N-Lübbecke
20	LB	Damir Bičanić	29 June 1985 (aged 27)	1.94 m			(France) Chambéry Handball
21	RB	Denis Buntić	13 October 1982 (aged 29)	1.99 m			(Poland) Vive Targi Kielce
25	GK	Mirko Alilović	15 September 1985 (aged 26)	2.00 m			(Hungary) MKB Veszprém
26	LW	Manuel Štrlek	1 December 1988 (aged 23)	1.84 m			(Croatia) RK Zagreb
27	RW	Ivan Čupić	27 March 1986 (aged 26)	1.79 m			(Germany) Rhein-Neckar Löwen
29	LW	Ivan Ninčević	27 October 1981 (aged 30)	1.84 m			(Germany) Füchse Berlin

=== Denmark ===
The following is the Denmark roster in the men's handball tournament of the 2012 Summer Olympics.

Head coaches: Ulrik Wilbek

No.	Pos.	Name	Date of birth (age)	Height	App.	Goals	Club
1	GK	Niklas Landin Jacobsen	19 December 1988 (aged 23)	2.00 m			(Denmark) Bjerringbro-Silkeborg
2	CB	Thomas Mogensen	30 January 1983 (aged 29)	1.87 m			(Germany) Flensburg-Handewitt
4	LB	Lasse Boesen	18 September 1979 (aged 32)	1.92 m			(Denmark) KIF Kolding
8	CB	Rasmus Lauge Schmidt	20 June 1991 (aged 21)	1.94 m			(Denmark) Bjerringbro-Silkeborg
10	LB	Nikolaj Markussen	1 August 1988 (aged 23)	2.12 m			(Spain) Atlético Madrid
11	LW	Anders Eggert Jensen	14 May 1982 (aged 30)	1.79 m			(Germany) Flensburg-Handewitt
13	CB	Bo Spellerberg	24 July 1979 (aged 33)	1.92 m			(Denmark) KIF Kolding
14	P	Michael V. Knudsen	4 September 1978 (aged 33)	1.92 m			(Germany) Flensburg-Handewitt
17	RW	Lasse Svan Hansen	31 August 1983 (aged 28)	1.87 m			(Germany) Flensburg-Handewitt
18	RW	Hans Lindberg	1 August 1981 (aged 30)	1.88 m			(Germany) HSV Hamburg
19	P	Rene Toft Hansen	1 November 1984 (aged 27)	2.00 m			(Denmark) AG København
20	GK	Marcus Cleverly	15 June 1981 (aged 31)	1.88 m			(Poland) Vive Targi Kielce
22	RB	Kasper Søndergaard Sarup	9 June 1981 (aged 31)	1.95 m			(Denmark) Skjern Håndbold
24	LB	Mikkel Hansen	22 October 1987 (aged 24)	1.96 m			(Denmark) AG København
26	LB	Kasper Nielsen	9 June 1975 (aged 37)	1.92 m			(Denmark) Bjerringbro-Silkeborg

=== Hungary ===
The following is the Hungary roster in the men's handball tournament of the 2012 Summer Olympics.

Head coaches: Lajos Mocsai

No.	Pos.	Name	Date of birth (age)	Height	App.	Goals	Club
3	LB	Ferenc Ilyés	20 December 1981 (aged 30)	1.98 m			(Hungary) MKB Veszprém
5	CB	Gábor Császár	16 June 1984 (aged 28)	1.98 m			(Hungary) MKB Veszprém
6	RB	Tamás Mocsai	9 December 1978 (aged 33)	1.96 m			(Germany) TSV Hannover-Burgdorf
8	LW	Gergő Iváncsik	30 November 1981 (aged 30)	1.90 m			(Hungary) MKB Veszprém
10	RW	Gergely Harsányi	3 May 1981 (aged 31)	1.91 m			(Hungary) Tatabánya
11	LB	Barna Putics	18 August 1984 (aged 27)	2.01 m			(Germany) Gummersbach
12	GK	Nándor Fazekas	16 October 1976 (aged 35)	1.92 m			(Hungary) MKB Veszprém
14	LB	Carlos Pérez	26 August 1971 (aged 40)	1.98 m			(Hungary) MKB Veszprém
16	GK	Roland Mikler	20 September 1984 (aged 27)	1.90 m			(Hungary) Pick Szeged
17	RB	Balázs Laluska	20 June 1981 (aged 31)	2.01 m			(Hungary) MKB Veszprém
19	RB	László Nagy	3 March 1981 (aged 31)	2.09 m			(Spain) FC Barcelona
20	RW	Péter Gulyás	4 March 1984 (aged 28)	2.00 m			(Hungary) MKB Veszprém
24	LW	Attila Vadkerti	22 February 1982 (aged 30)	1.82 m			(Hungary) Pick Szeged
25	P	Szabolcs Zubai	31 March 1984 (aged 28)	1.93 m			(Hungary) Pick Szeged
28	P	Timuzsin Schuch	5 June 1985 (aged 27)	1.97 m			(Hungary) MKB Veszprém
66	CB	Máté Lékai	16 June 1988 (aged 24)	1.90 m			(Slovenia) Celje Pivovarna Laško

=== Serbia ===
The following is the Serbia roster in the men's handball tournament of the 2012 Summer Olympics.

Head coaches: Veselin Vuković

No.	Pos.	Name	Date of birth (age)	Height	App.	Goals	Club
1	GK	Dragan Marjanac	26 February 1985 (aged 27)	1.92 m	58	1	(Switzerland) BSV Bern Muri
5	LB	Žarko Šešum	16 June 1986 (aged 26)	1.95 m	106	271	(Germany) Rhein-Neckar Löwen
6	LB	Marko Vujin	7 December 1984 (aged 27)	1.97 m	80	332	(Germany) THW Kiel
7	RW	Ivan Nikčević	11 February 1981 (aged 31)	1.82 m	95	346	(Poland) Wisła Płock
9	CB	Nikola Manojlović	1 December 1981 (aged 30)	1.95 m	32	36	(Slovenia) RK Cimos Koper
11	P	Alem Toskić	12 February 1982 (aged 30)	1.90 m	124	256	(Slovenia) Celje Pivovarna Laško
12	GK	Darko Stanić	8 October 1978 (aged 33)	1.90 m	74	0	(North Macedonia) RK Metalurg
13	LB	Momir Ilić	22 December 1981 (aged 30)	2.00 m	104	355	(Germany) THW Kiel
15	LW	Dobrivoje Marković	22 April 1986 (aged 26)	1.90 m	90	171	(Spain) BM Ciudad Encantada
17	RW	Rajko Prodanović	24 April 1986 (aged 26)	1.86 m	88	199	(Hungary) Pick Szeged
20	LB	Momir Rnić	1 November 1987 (aged 24)	1.97 m	55	83	(Germany) Frisch Auf Göppingen
22	P	Bojan Beljanski	22 June 1986 (aged 26)	2.00 m	36	40	(Germany) Frisch Auf Göppingen
23	CB	Nenad Vučković	23 August 1980 (aged 31)	1.92 m	96	185	(Germany) MT Melsungen
25	CB	Dalibor Čutura	14 June 1975 (aged 37)	1.90 m	23	53	(Spain) CB Ademar León
26	LB	Ivan Stanković	27 April 1982 (aged 30)	1.92 m	45	74	(France) US Créteil

=== South Korea ===
The following is the South Korea roster in the men's handball tournament of the 2012 Summer Olympics.

Head coaches: Cho Young-shin

No.	Pos.	Name	Date of birth (age)	Height	App.	Goals	Club
1	GK	Lee Chang-woo	12 May 1983 (aged 29)	1.87 m			(South Korea) Chungnam
2	CB	Jeong Yi-kyeong	28 February 1985 (aged 27)	1.88 m			(South Korea) Doosan
5	P	Park Kyung-suk	25 April 1981 (aged 31)	1.85 m			(South Korea) Chungnam
7	RW	Jung Su-young	17 October 1985 (aged 26)	1.84 m			(South Korea) HC Korosa
8	P	Park Jung-gyu	2 November 1983 (aged 28)	1.90 m			(South Korea) KHF
11	LW	Lim Duk-jun	30 August 1980 (aged 31)	1.86 m			(South Korea) Doosan
12	GK	Park Chan-young	26 January 1983 (aged 29)	1.90 m			(South Korea) Doosan
13	RB	Lee Jae-woo	28 September 1979 (aged 32)	1.81 m			(South Korea) Doosan
17	RW	Yu Dong-geun	3 September 1985 (aged 26)	1.85 m			(South Korea) Incheon DTC
19	LW	Jeong Han	17 May 1988 (aged 24)	1.85 m			(South Korea) Incheon DTC
20	LB	Paek Won-chul	10 January 1977 (aged 35)	1.80 m			(South Korea) HC Korosa
22	LB	Ko Kyung-soo	5 February 1985 (aged 27)	1.82 m			(South Korea) Chungnam
33	RB	Eom Hyo-won	12 December 1986 (aged 25)	1.82 m			(South Korea) Sangmu
77	RB	Yoon Kyung-shin	7 July 1973 (aged 39)	2.03 m			(South Korea) KHF
88	P	Jung Jin-ho	10 March 1986 (aged 26)	1.93 m			(South Korea) HC Korosa

=== Spain ===
The following is the Spain roster in the men's handball tournament of the 2012 Summer Olympics.

Head coaches: Valero Rivera

No.	Pos.	Name	Date of birth (age)	Height	App.	Goals	Club
1	GK	José Javier Hombrados	7 April 1972 (aged 40)	1.96 m			(Spain) Atlético Madrid
3	RB	Eduardo Gurbindo	8 November 1987 (aged 24)	1.95 m			(Spain) BM Valladolid
4	RW	Albert Rocas	16 June 1982 (aged 30)	1.88 m			(Spain) FC Barcelona
5	RB	Jorge Maqueda	6 February 1988 (aged 24)	1.97 m			(Spain) BM Aragón
8	RW	Víctor Tomás	15 February 1985 (aged 27)	1.77 m			(Spain) FC Barcelona
9	CB	Raúl Entrerríos	12 February 1981 (aged 31)	1.93 m			(Spain) FC Barcelona
10	LB	Mikel Aguirrezabalaga	8 April 1984 (aged 28)	1.96 m			(Spain) FC Barcelona
11	CB	Daniel Sarmiento Melián	25 August 1983 (aged 28)	1.88 m			(Spain) FC Barcelona
13	P	Julen Aguinagalde	2 December 1982 (aged 29)	1.96 m			(Spain) Atlético Madrid
15	LW	Cristian Ugalde	19 October 1987 (aged 24)	1.86 m			(Spain) FC Barcelona
16	GK	Árpád Sterbik	20 November 1979 (aged 32)	2.00 m			(Spain) Atlético Madrid
21	CB	Joan Cañellas	30 September 1986 (aged 25)	1.98 m			(Spain) Atlético Madrid
24	LB	Viran Morros	15 December 1983 (aged 28)	1.99 m			(Spain) FC Barcelona
30	P	Gedeón Guardiola	1 October 1984 (aged 27)	1.99 m			(Spain) San Antonio

== See also ==
- Handball at the 2012 Summer Olympics – Women's team rosters
