= Ciaran Williams =

British handball player

Ciaran Williams (born 22 December 1987 in Salford, Greater Manchester) is a British handball coach, currently head coach of Great Britain's U18 squad. At the 2012 Summer Olympics he competed with the Great Britain men's national handball team in the men's tournament.

== Early life ==
Williams began playing handball at the age of 7, inspired by his parents who both played the game.

== Club career ==
At senior club level, Williams played in Germany for TUSEM Essen alongside future Team GB teammates Christopher McDermott, Daniel McMillan and Christopher Mohr before playing in Norway with Halden Topphandball. Whilst there, he had to clean toilets to earn money after funding was cut. He later returned to England and played for Salford Handball Club before being selected for Great Britain in the 2012 Olympics. He captained the Olympic Squad and later played for Sandnes HK in Norway whilst studying for a business and administration degree.

== International career ==
Williams played a total of 46 times for his country, scoring 76 goals. He captained Team GB during the 2012 Olympics and described participating as "the greatest experience of my life".

== Coaching career ==
Williams began coaching in Norway, leading Kolbotn boys' team to the national under-16 title in 2016. In 2017, he was appointed as coach of St. Hallvard's under-21s team. Shortly afterwards, he was also made head coach of Great Britain's under-18 men's team.
