= Stuart Garnham =

English footballer

Personal information
- Full name: Stuart Edward Garnham
- Date of birth: 30 November 1955 (age 70)
- Place of birth: Selby, England
- Position: Goalkeeper

Senior career*
Years	Team	Apps	(Gls)
1973–1977	Wolverhampton Wanderers	0	(0)
1974–1975	→ Northampton Town (loan)	1	(0)
1976–1977	Peterborough United	2	(0)
1977–1978	→ Northampton Town (loan)	11	(0)
1978–1980	Karlstads BK		
1981–1982	Djurgårdens IF	8	(0)
1983–1984	Kils AIK		
1985	Degerfors IF	9	(0)
- * Club domestic league appearances and goals

Stuart Edward Garnham (born 30 November 1955) is an English former footballer, who played as goalkeeper. He is now a Science teacher in Sunne, Sweden.

== Career ==
Garnham played for Wolverhampton Wanderers, Northampton Town F.C. and Peterborough United F.C. before going to Sweden. In 1978, he joined Karlstads BK. In 1981, he joined Djurgårdens IF from Karlstads BK. He made eight Allsvenskan appearances for Djurgården.

== Personal life ==
Garham's son Robin represented the British national team at the 2012 Summer Olympics in London.
