= Sebastián Prieto =

Sebastián Prieto may refer to:

- Sebastián Prieto (footballer) (born 1993), Argentine footballer
- Sebastian Prieto (handballer) (born 1987), British handball player
- Sebastián Prieto (tennis) (born 1975), Argentine tennis player
