= John Pearce (handballer) =

British handball player

John Pearce (born 23 November 1987, Poole) is a British handball player. At the 2012 Summer Olympics he competed with the Great Britain men's national handball team in the men's tournament. At club level, he played for Skanderborg Håndbold. He was educated at Dumpton School, Wimbourne where he went on to Bryanston School in Dorset.

He has a role with England Handball organising tournaments.
