= Mark Hawkins =

British handball player

Mark Hawkins (born 28 December 1985) is a British handball coach, currently head coach of Great Britain senior women's national team. He was born in Horsham, West Sussex. At the 2012 Summer Olympics he competed with the Great Britain men's national handball team in the men's tournament.

== Playing career ==
Hawkins took up handball after deciding he was too short to play basketball. At club level, he played in Iceland with UMF Afturelding at the time of his Olympic selection. From 2014 to 2016, he played for Ruislip Eagles.

He represented Britain at the 2012 Olympics as well as in Euro qualifying, scoring against Italy. As of 2016, he had scored 135 goals in 60 matches at international level.

== Coaching career ==
Hawkins coached Britain's teams at youth level and eventually took the role of under 20 coach, before becoming an assistant coach for China women's national team. From 2018-2022 he was head coach of Norwegian club IK Våg after which he was part of the coaching staff for the Saudi Arabia men's national team at the 2023 World Championships in Sweden and Poland.
