= Afturelding (men's handball) =

Icelandic handball club

UMF Afturelding
- Full name: Ungmennafélagið Afturelding
- Short name: UMFA
- Founded: 1909; 116 years ago
- Arena: Itrottamidstöd Varma, Mosfellsbær
- President: Haukur Sörli Sigurvinsson
- Head coach: Gunnar Magnússon
- League: Úrvalsdeild karla
- Club colours
Home	Away

The Afturelding men's handball team, commonly known as Afturelding or UMF Afturelding, is an Iceland team handball club from Mosfellsbær, that plays in the Úrvalsdeild karla. It is part of the Ungmennafélagið Afturelding multi-sport club.

Location of UMF Afturelding

== Crest, colours, supporters ==
=== Kits ===
HOME
2022–23	2023–24

== Team ==
=== Current squad ===
Squad for the 2023–24 season

UMF Afturelding

Goalkeepers

- 1 (Iceland) Brynjar Vignir Sigurjónsson
- 12 (Iceland) Sigurjón Bragi Atlason
- 19 (Serbia) Jovan Kukobat

Left Wingers

- 17 (Iceland) Gunnar Malmquist Thorsson
- 44 (Iceland) Andri Thor Helgason
- 99 (Ukraine) Igor Kopishinsky

Right Wingers

- 7 (Iceland) Árni Bragi Eyjólfsson
- 15 (Iceland) Stefán Hjartarson
- 88 (Iceland) Leó Snaer Pétursson

Line Players

- 3 (Iceland) Jakob Aronsson
- 4 (Iceland) Thorvaldur Tryggvason
- 14 (Iceland) Haraldur Björn Hjörleifsson

Central Backs

- 24 (Iceland) Blaer Hinriksson
- 25 (Iceland) Gísli Rúnar Jóhannsson

Left Backs

- 5 (Iceland) Thorsteinn Leó Gunnarsson
- 10 (Iceland) Bergvin Thor Gíslason
- 11 (Iceland) Böðvar Pall Ásgeirsson
- 23 (Iceland) Birgir Steinn Jónsson

Right Backs

- 6 (Iceland) Aevar Smári Gunnarsson
- 20 (Iceland) Birkir Benediktsson

=== Technical staff ===
- Head coach: (Iceland) Gunnar Magnússon
- Assistant coach: (Iceland) Stefán Árnason
- Goalkeeping coach: (Iceland) Einar Bragason
- Physiotherapist: (Iceland) Unnar Arnarsson

=== Transfers ===
Transfers for the 2025–26 season

Joining

- (Denmark) Oscar Lykke (LB) from (Denmark) TMS Ringsted

Leaving

- (Iceland) Blaer Hinriksson (CB) to (Germany) SC DHfK Leipzig
- (Iceland) Birgir Steinn Jónsson (LB) to (Sweden) IK Sävehof

== Accomplishments ==
=== Domestic ===
- Úrvalsdeild karla
  - Winner (1) : 1999
- Icelandic Men's Handball Cup
  - Winner (2) : 1999, 2023

== EHF ranking ==
As of 5/12/2025

Rank	Team	Points
196	(Israel) Maccabi Rishon LeZion	12
197	(Russia) Dynamo Viktor	11
198	(Belarus) SKA Minsk	11
199	(Iceland) Afturelding	11
200	(England) London GD HC	11
201	(Netherlands) OCI/Limburg Lions	10
202	(Ukraine) HC Donbass Donetsk	10

== Former club members ==
=== Notable former players ===
- (Iceland) Ernir Hrafn Arnarson (2016-2021)
- (Iceland) Elvar Ásgeirsson (2012-2019)
- (Iceland) Bergsveinn Bergsveinsson (1997-1999)
- (Iceland) Guðmundur Hrafnkelsson (2005-2006)
- (Iceland) (Norway) Sverre Andreas Jakobsson (2001-2003)
- (Iceland) Bjarki Sigurðsson (1995-1997, 1998-2003)
- (Estonia) Mikk Pinnonen (2016-2018)
- (Finland) (Iceland) Thorsteinn Hjálmarsson (2019-2021)
- (United Kingdom) Mark Hawkins (2010-2014)
- (United Kingdom) Christopher McDermott (2011-2012)
- (Lithuania) Gintaras Savukynas (1998-2001)
