= Sveinn Jóhannsson =

Icelandic handball player (born 1999)

Personal information
- Nationality: Icelandic
- Born: 16 June 1999 (age 27) Copenhagen, Denmark
- Height: 1.96 m (6 ft 5 in)

Sport
- Sport: Handball
- Position: Pivot
- Current club: GWD Minden
- Number: 10

Youth career
- Years: Team
- –2014: Fjölnir

Senior clubs
- Years: Team
- 2014–2018: Fjölnir
- 2018–2019: ÍR
- 2019–2022: SønderjyskE HH
- 2022: Skjern Håndbold
- 2023–2024: GWD Minden
- 2024–2025: Kolstad Håndball
- 2025–: Chambéry SMB HB
National team
Years	Team	Apps	(Gls)
2019–	Iceland	16	(26)
- Updated on 3 March 2025

Sveinn Jóhannsson (born 16 June 1999) is an Icelandic handball player for Norwegian club Kolstad Håndball and the Icelandic national team.

He represented Iceland at the 2020 European Men's Handball Championship.

Sveinn came up through the junior ranks of Fjölnir.

After a season at Íþróttafélag Reykjavíkur he joined Danish side SønderjyskE Håndbold. In 2022 he was supposed joined the German Bundesliga team of HC Erlangen, but failed his medical check. Instead he joined Danish side Skjern Håndbold.

In January 2023 he joined GWD Minden. At the end of his first season at the club, he was relegated to the 2. Handball-Bundesliga. In 2024 he joined Norwegian Kolstad IL. One year later, he goes to France and Chambéry Savoie Mont-Blanc Handball
