= Robert White (handballer) =

British handball player

Robert White (born 5 April 1983) is a British handball player. At the 2012 Summer Olympics he competed with the Great Britain men's national handball team in the men's tournament.

== Early life ==
White spent his childhood in Milton Keynes where he participated in a variety of sports including football, karate and swimming. He later played Non-League football for Newport Pagnell Town and Ardley United. He later completed FA coaching qualifications and graduated from the University of Northampton with a degree in Sport and Exercise Science.

== Introduction to handball ==
White began his handball career via a UK Sport scheme to unearth potential Olympic athletes. After impressing during trials, he earned a scholarship with Austrian club Bregenz Handball. After 4 months at his new club, he moved on to the Great Britain academy in Denmark before signing professional terms with Greek club AO Kydon Chania. He then moved to French club Valence for the final season before the Olympic games commenced.

== 2012 Olympics ==
White captained Team GB Handball during the Olympics. The team lost all of its games, finishing the competition with a goal difference of minus 96.

== Post Olympics ==
Following the end of the Olympics, White decided to remain in the UK, taking a role at a British Handball Centre of Excellence. In 2013, White was made player-coach of a new handball side in Milton Keynes. In 2015, White was head coach of the British Handball squad. Since this, White now acts as the National Performance Manager for England Handball Association, and manages the EHA Talent Pathway, in addition to the DiSE (Diploma in Sporting Excellence) program, formerly known as AASE (Advanced Apprenticeship in Sporting Excellence), aimed at talented Under 18s.
