= Bjarki Sigurðsson =

Icelandic handball player (born 1967)

Personal information
- Nationality: Icelandic
- Born: 16 November 1967 (age 58) Iceland

Sport
- Sport: Handball
- Position: Left wing

Senior clubs
- Years: Team
- 1985–1995: Víkingur
- 1995–1997: UMF Afturelding
- 1997–1998: Drammen
- 1998–2003: UMF Afturelding
- 2003–2005: Víkingur
National team
Years	Team	Apps	(Gls)
1987–2001	Iceland	228	(575)

Teams managed
- 2000-2002, 2006-2008: UMF Afturelding

Bjarki Sigurðsson (born 16 November 1967) is an Icelandic former handball player and handball coach. He competed in the 1988 Summer Olympics. Bjarki is one of the most experienced players in the history of the Iceland men's national handball team. His son is footballer Bjarki Steinn Bjarkason.

He coached Icelandic side UMF Afturelding between 2000 and 2002 and again from 2006 and 2008.
