= Martin Hare =

British handball player

Martin Hare (born 28 November 1989) is a British handball player. He was born in Brighton, East Sussex, England. At the 2012 Summer Olympics he competed with the Great Britain men's national handball team in the men's tournament.

== Career ==
In 2012, Hare played top flight handball in Norway with Viking HK. In 2017, he was playing for Sandnes.
