= Jesper Parker =

British handball player

Jesper Parker (born 18 April 1984) is a British handball goalkeeper. At the 2012 Summer Olympics he competed with the Great Britain men's national handball team in the men's tournament.

Although born and raised in Sweden, he was eligible for Team GB through his British father. At the time of the 2012 Olympics he played in the Swedish second division. Team GB lost every game during the 2012 Olympics, although Parker's performance was noted as being one of few positives for the team.
