= Olympic Catuvellauni =

- Full name: Olympic Catuvellauni Sports Club
- Short name: MK Olycats
- Founded: 2013
- Dissolved: 2018
- Arena: Milton Keynes
Home	Away

Olympic Catuvellauni is a former English handball club from Milton Keynes.

== Etymology ==
Pronounced Cat-oo-well-orn-ee Sports Club was formed in 2013. The Olympic aspect is in recognition of forming a London 2012 legacy whilst Catuvellauni is a nod to the Celtic tribe that emerged in ancient Britain to become one of the most powerful tribes in Southern England.

== History ==
=== Foundation ===
Former Stamford A.F.C. chairman Chris Rivett formed the multi-discipline sporting club in 2013. Rivett, the managing director of Final Third Sports Media, an award-winning company that he set up in 2005, explained when announcing the club's creation: "I have been very flattered by the opportunities that have come my way since leaving Stamford. However, having spent time considering whether I wished to take up another role exclusively in football, I started to look at the alternatives and the chance to build a brand new club, structured around modern beliefs and values, really appeals to me. It is something that just doesn't happen these days, not from scratch.

"I feel very passionately about doing something community-focused that benefits grassroot clubs and local schools upwards, and not just in one sports code. Multi-sport disciplines are very common on the continent, as well as in America, and I've seen first-hand the additional benefits they offer a community.

“Having worked at the Games [for the Olympic News Service] the ideology of 'inspiring a generation' has become almost a cliche to some but for most who were directly involved, and certainly me personally, that has been a big focus since the Olympics and it is my intention to set something up that will benefit the local sport scene in a variety of ways.

"At the initial stages of bouncing the idea around to industry contacts I was hoping someone would tell me it was a mad idea but quite the contrary, the level of enthusiasm for the project has been encouraging and we are already very close to announcing the first branch of the club that we are confident will attract Team GB Olympians to represent it.

"We are also at the preliminary stage of conversations with other sporting codes about becoming part of the Olympic Catuvellauni family."

=== Team creation ===
It was announced on June 20, 2013 the first Olympic legacy Olympic Catuvellauni team would compete in Handball.

The side, based in Milton Keynes, England, was an affiliate to the EHA and will be managed by the 2012 Great Britain Handball team goalkeeper and captain, Bobby White. They compete din the Midlands development league for the 2013 season and the Championship South. at the second tier of English Handball.

Robert White was made the first player-coach.
