= Chris Rivett =

- Born: Chris Rivett; 25 April 1979 (age 46); Northampton, Northamptonshire, England
- Occupations: Businessman, journalist
- Known for: Chair of Olympic Catuvellauni
- Website: www.chrisrivett.co.uk

Chris Rivett (born 25 April 1979) is the chairman of Olympic Catuvellauni, a multi-discipline sporting club he formed in 2013. Prior to establishing the Oly Cats, he was chairman of Stamford A.F.C., until he resigned in March 2013.

== Football ==
Chris was appointed as chairman of Stamford in August 2012, having only joined the board as a director in July 2012. At the time of his appointment he was the second youngest chairman of a football club in England, only Tiverton Town's Matthew Conridge is younger.

On Chris' recommendation, the club received global media coverage in August 2012 when it was announced that they would become the first sports team in the world to wear their Twitter handle and QR code on the back of the first-team shirts for 2012/13 season.

Prior to joining Stamford, Chris was on the board at Corby Town. When Corby appointed him as a director in July 2011 he was the youngest director of a football club in the country. He resigned from his position at the start of July 2012 to take the chair at the Daniels.

He is the managing director of Final Third Sports Media who have offices in England and Australia and prior to setting up his business in 2005, worked for Northampton Town F.C. and Luton Town F.C.
