= Gawain Vincent =

British handball player

Gawain Vincent (born 9 March 1990, Les Lilas) is a British handball player. At the 2012 Summer Olympics he competed with the Great Britain men's national handball team in the men's tournament.

== Club career ==
Vincent began his career with Torcy Handball Club before moving to play for HBC Nantes in 2010. By 2013, he was playing for Girondins HBC.

== International career ==
Born in France to an English mother, Vincent represented Britain beginning in 2009. He was selected as part of the 2012 Olympic squad and had to pay for his own plane tickets and meals to compete for the team. He competed in all five of the team's games, scoring a total of nine goals.
