= Sebastian Prieto (handballer) =

British handball player

Sebastian Prieto (born 4 February 1987, Monaco) is a British handball player. At the 2012 Summer Olympics he competed with the Great Britain men's national handball team in the men's tournament.

== Early life ==
Born to a French mother and an English father, Prieto was raised in Monaco where he initially played football at junior level for AS Monaco before taking up handball at the age of 15.

== Career ==
In May 2006, Prieto moved to Denmark to play handball full time, after reading about the Olympic project online. He later played for German club TUSEM Essen along with several other members of the British Handball squad.
