= Samuel Honrubia =

French handball player (born 1986)

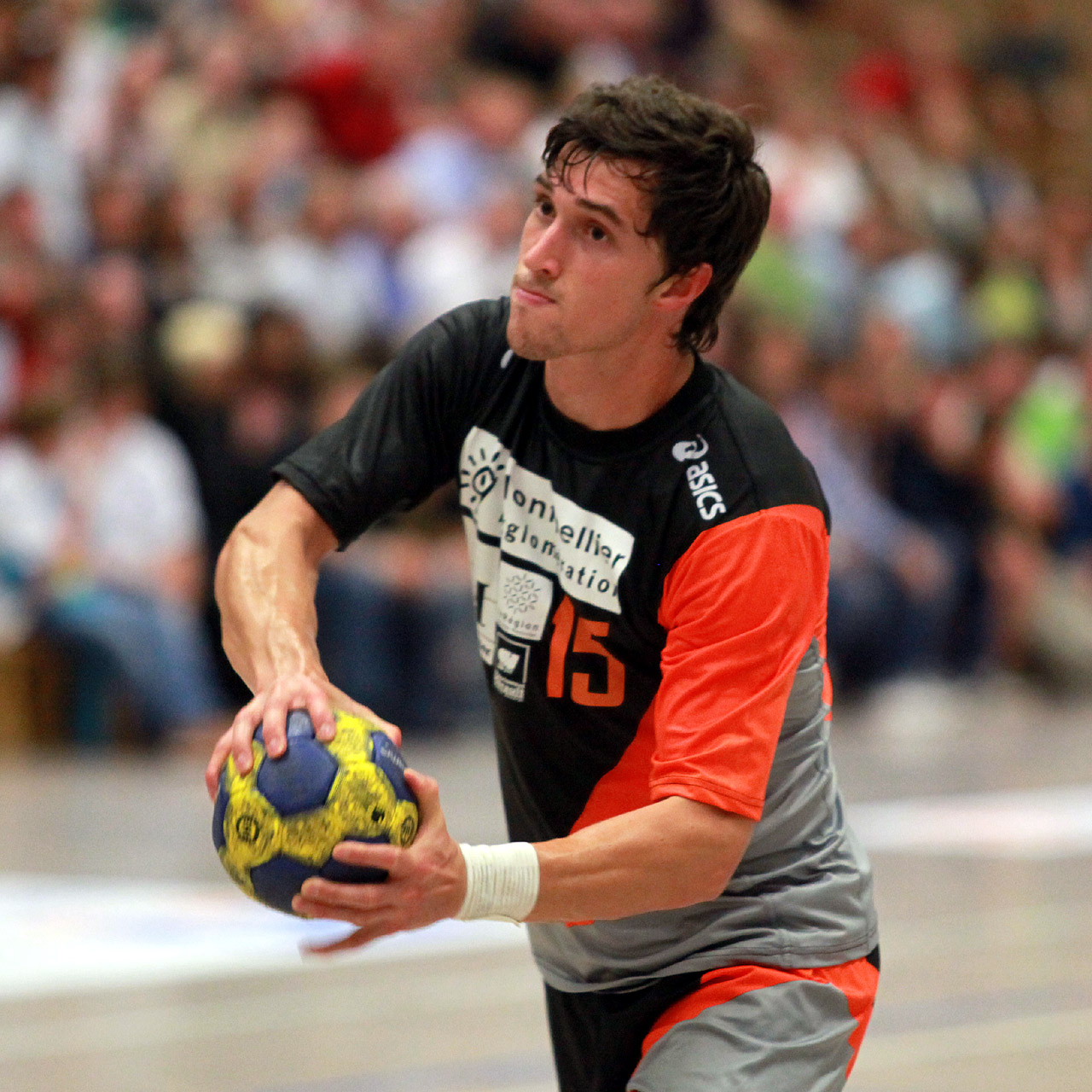

Personal information
- Nationality: French
- Born: 5 July 1986 (age 40) Béziers, France
- Height: 1.80 m (5 ft 11 in)

Sport
- Sport: Handball
- Position: Left wing

Youth career
- Years: Team
- –: Montagnac HB
- –: HBC Clermont-Salagou
- –: CREPS Montpellier

Senior clubs
- Years: Team
- 2001–2012: Montpellier Handball
- 2012–2016: PSG Handball
- 2016–2019: Tremblay Handball
- 2019–2021: Pays d'Aix Université Club
- 2021–: Istres Provence Handball
National team
Years	Team	Apps	(Gls)
2009–2017	France	87	(198)
Medal record
Olympic Games
Gold medal – first place	2012 London	Team
World Championship
Gold medal – first place	2011 Sweden
Gold medal – first place	2015 Qatar
European Championship
Gold medal – first place	2014 Denmark

Samuel Honrubia (born 5 July 1986) is a former French handball player, who competed for and the French national team. He has competed at the 2012 Summer Olympics, where France won the gold medal and at the 2015 World Championship and 2011 World Championship where France also won gold medals.

== Career ==
Honrubia started playing handball at Racing Club Montagnac. His senior debut came for Montpellier HB, where he played until 2012. In 2012 he joined PSG Handball. Here he won the French Championship in 2013, 2015 and 2016, as wella s the 2014 and 2015 French Cup.

In 2016 he joined Tremblay-en-France Handball. He retired in 2019, but reconsidered and joined Pays d'Aix Université Club. In 2021 he joined Istres Provence Handball.

== National team ==
Honrubia played at the 2010 European Men's Handball Championship, and at the 2014 European Men's Handball Championship, where he became European Championship.
