= Xavier Barachet =

French handball player (born 1988)

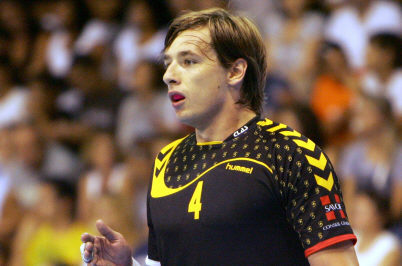

Personal information
- Full name: Xavier Barachet
- Nationality: French
- Born: 19 November 1988 (age 37) Nice, France
- Height: 1.96 m (6 ft 5 in)

Sport
- Sport: Handball
- Position: Right back
- Current club: Saint-Raphaël Var Handball
- Number: 14

Youth career
- Years: Team
- 1997–2006: Cavigal Nice Sports HB

Senior clubs
- Years: Team
- 2006–2012: Chambéry Savoie Handball
- 2012–2013: Atlético Madrid
- 2013–2014: Saint-Raphaël Var Handball
- 2014–2017: Paris Saint-Germain
- 2017–2022: Saint-Raphaël Var Handball
National team
Years	Team	Apps	(Gls)
2009–2015	France	84	(162)
Medal record
Representing France
Men's handball
Olympic Games
Gold medal – first place	2012 London	Team
World Championship
Gold medal – first place	2009 Croatia	Team
Gold medal – first place	2011 Sweden	Team
Gold medal – first place	2015 Qatar	Team
European Championship
Gold medal – first place	2010 Austria	Team

Xavier Barachet (born 19 November 1988) is a French retired handball player, two-time World champion and European champion with the French national team.

On 1 January 2013, Barachet was made a Knight (Chevalier) of the Légion d'honneur.

== Career ==
Barachet started at Cavigal Nice Sports HB and joined Chambéry Savoie Handball in the Ligue Nationale de Handball in 2006. In 2012 he joined Spanish side Atlético Madrid. Here he played for a single season, in which he won the Copa del Rey de Balonmano.

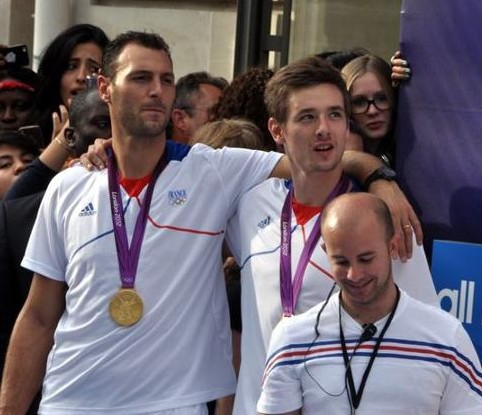
Xavier Barachet (r.) with the Olympic Goldmedal 2012

Due to financial troubles for the club, he returned to France a year later and signed for Paris Saint-Germain. For the 2013/14 he was loaned to league rivals Saint-Raphaël Var Handball.

Three years later he joined Saint-Raphaël Var Handball permanently. He retired in 2022.

== Achievements ==
- Ligue Nationale de Handball:
  - Runner-up: 2008, 2009, 2011
- Coupe de France:
  - Finalist: 2009, 2011
- Liga ASOBAL:
  - Runner-up: 2012/13
- Copa del Rey:
  - Winner: 2012/13
- Copa ASOBAL:
  - Finalist: 2013
- Supercopa ASOBAL:
  - Finalist: 2012
- IHF Super Globe:
  - Winner: 2012
- World Championship:
  - Winner: 2009, 2011
- European Championship:
  - Winner: 2010
