= Johan Sjöstrand =

Swedish handball player (born 1987)

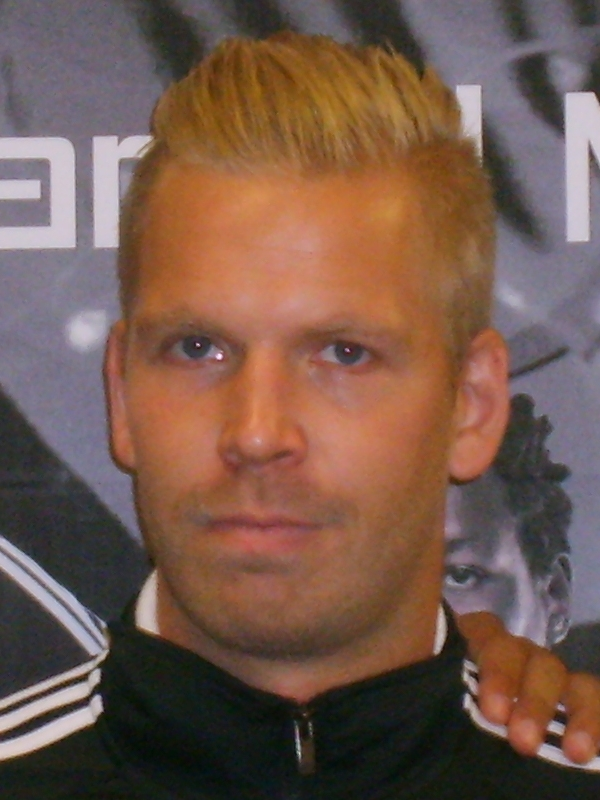

Personal information
- Nationality: Swedish
- Born: 26 February 1987 (age 39) Skövde, Sweden
- Height: 1.95 m (6 ft 5 in)

Sport
- Sport: Handball
- Position: Goalkeeper
- Current club: Bjerringbro-Silkeborg
- Number: 12

Senior clubs
- Years: Team
- 2005–2009: IFK Skövde HK
- 2009–2010: SG Flensburg-Handewitt
- 2010–2012: FC Barcelona
- 2012–2013: Aalborg Håndbold
- 2013–2015: THW Kiel
- 2015–2020: MT Melsungen
- 2020–: Bjerringbro-Silkeborg
National team
Years	Team	Apps	(Gls)
2008–2016	Sweden	90	(0)
Medal record
Olympic Games
Silver medal – second place	2012 London	Team

Johan Sjöstrand (Swedish pronunciation: [ˈjûːan ˈɧø̂ːstrand]; born 26 February 1987) is a Swedish handballer for Bjerringbro-Silkeborg, and has represented the Swedish national team at several competitions including the 2012 Olympic Games where he was part of the Swedish team that won the silver medal.

He was named Swedish Player of the Year in 2011.
