= Damir Bičanić =

Croatian handball player (born 1985)

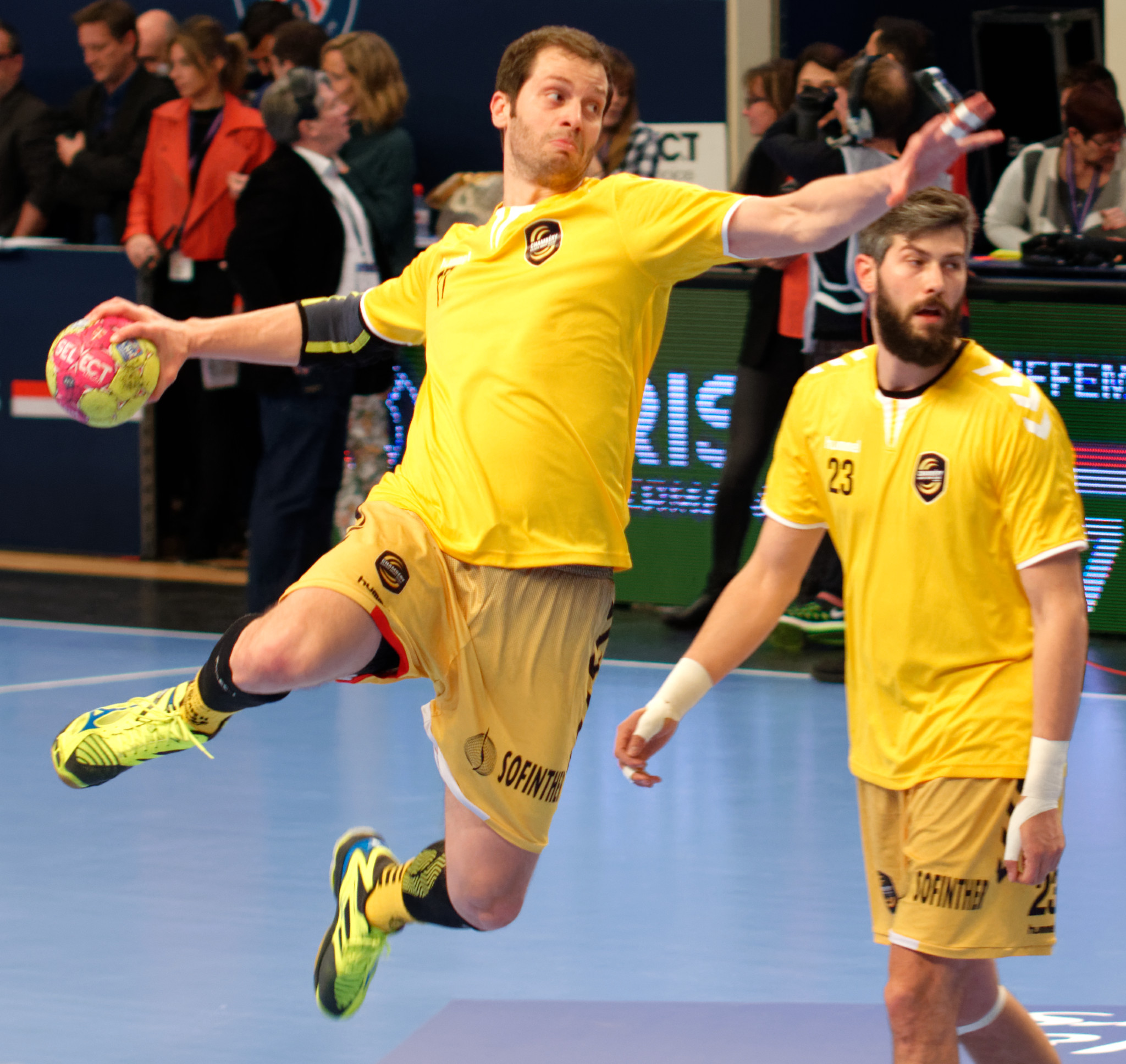

Personal information
- Nationality: Croatian
- Born: 29 July 1985 (age 41) Vukovar, Croatia
- Height: 1.94 m (6 ft 4 in)

Sport
- Sport: Handball
- Position: Left back
- Current club: RK Zagreb
- Number: 77

Senior clubs
- Years: Team
- 2002–2004: Umag
- 2004–2005: Osijek Elektromodul
- 2005–2007: Agram Medveščak
- 2007–2008: CO Zagreb
- 2008–2010: CB Ademar León
- 2010–2017: Chambéry
- 2017–2020: PPD Zagreb
National team
Years	Team	Apps	(Gls)
2005–2020	Croatia	101	(176)
Medal record
Olympic Games
Bronze medal – third place	2012 London	Team
World Championships
Bronze medal – third place	2013 Spain
European Championships
Silver medal – second place	2010 Austria
Bronze medal – third place	2012 Serbia
Mediterranean Games
Silver medal – second place	2005 Almería	Team

Damir Bičanić (born 29 July 1985) is a Croatian handball player, playing for RK Zagreb and the Croatian national team.

He competed for the Croatian national team at the 2012 Summer Olympics in London.

== Honours ==
RK Zagreb

- Croatian Premier League: 2006–07, 2007–08, 2017–2018, 2018–2019
- Croatian Cup: 2007, 2008, 2018, 2019

CB Ademar León

- Copa ASOBAL: 2009

Chambéry

- Trophée des champions: 2013
