= Mattias Gustafsson =

Swedish handball player (born 1978)

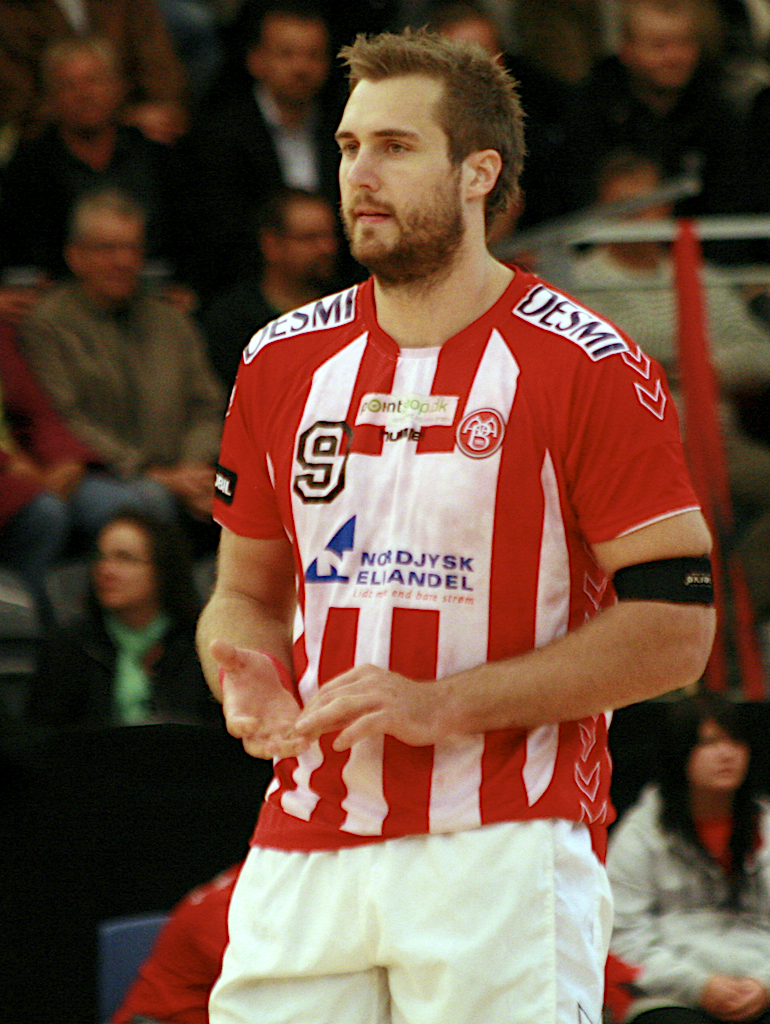

Personal information
- Full name: Mattias Gustafsson
- Nationality: Swedish (Sweden)
- Born: 1 July 1978 (age 48) Åkersberga, Sweden
- Height: 193 cm (76 in)

Sport
- Sport: Handball
- Position: Line player

Senior clubs
- Years: Team
- -1999: Polisen/Söder
- 1999-2000: Viking Stavanger
- 2000-2006: IFK Skövde HK
- 2006-2008: FCK Håndbold
- 2008-2010: AaB
- 2010-2014: TuS N-Lübbecke
- 2014-2016: Ricoh Handboll
National team
Years	Team	Apps	(Gls)
2000-?	Sweden	102	(144)
Medal record
Olympic Games
Silver medal – second place	2012 London	Team

Mattias Gustafsson (born 11 July 1978) is a Swedish former handball player. Gustafsson made 102 appearances for the Swedish national handball team. He was named Swedish player of the year in 2010.
