= Christopher Mohr =

British handball player

Christopher Mohr (born 12 January 1990, Frankfurt am Main) is a British handball player. At the 2012 Summer Olympics he competed with the Great Britain men's national handball team in the men's tournament.

== Career ==
Mohr is half Scottish.

in 2009, Mohr played club handball for TUSEM Essen in the Handball-Bundesliga alongside five other British players. He prepared for the Olympics at a training camp in Denmark, whilst also working in a bakery. Following the Olympics, he returned to Denmark to continue playing and also appeared for Great Britain again during the 2014 European Men's Handball Championship qualification.
