= Chambéry Savoie Mont-Blanc Handball =

French handball club

- Short name: Team Chambé, CSMBHB
- Founded: 1990
- Arena: Le Phare
- Capacity: 4,500
- President: (France) Alain Poncet
- Head coach: (France) Érick Mathé
- League: LNH Division 1
- 2024–25: 9th of 16
- Club colours
Home	Away

Chambéry Savoie Mont-Blanc Handball is a French handball team based in Chambéry in Savoie. The team plays in the French Handball Championship and it was founded in 1990.

== Crest, colours, supporters ==
=== Naming history ===
Name	Period
Stade olympique de Chambéry	1968–1983
Chambéry Handball Club	1983–1990
Stade olympique de Chambéry	1990–2002
Chambéry Savoie Handball	2002–2016
Chambéry Savoie Mont Blanc Handball	2016–present

=== Kit manufacturers ===
Period	Kit manufacturer
– 1998	(Germany) Adidas
1998–1999	(Germany) Erima
1999–2018	(Denmark) Hummel
2018–present	(Japan) Mizuno

=== Kits ===
HOME
2020–21	2021–22	2023–24

AWAY
2013–14	2020–21	2021–	2023–24

== Team ==
=== Current squad ===
Squad for the 2025–26 season

Chambéry SMBH

Goalkeepers

- 1 (Spain) Roberto Rodríguez
- 16 (France) Valentin Kieffer

Right Wingers

- 69 (France) Emilien Peyronnet

Left Wingers

- 3 (France) Queido Traoré
- 8 (France) Elio Zammit

Line Players

- 5 (Iceland) Sveinn Jóhannsson
- 13 (France) Adrien Vergely
- 20 (France) Sasha Frattaruolo
- 23 (France) Pierre Paturel (c)

Left Backs

- 7 (France) Dimitri Claude
- 17 (Norway) Simen Holand Pettersen
- 37 (Spain) Alejandro Costoya
- 55 (Spain) Iosu Goñi Leoz

Central Backs

- 25 (France) Lucas Vanègue
- 30 (Portugal) André Sousa

Right Backs

- 14 (Slovenia) Matic Grošelj
- 21 (Greece) Achilleas Tóskas
- 51 (France) Hugo Pimenta

=== Transfers ===
Transfers for the 2026–27 season

Joining

- (Portugal) Gabriel Cavalcanti (LB) from (Portugal) S.L. Benfica
- (Croatia) Josip Zaja (RB) from (Spain) BM Logroño La Rioja
- (France) Gautier Loredon (LP) from (France) Paris Saint-Germain
- (France) David Bernard (GK) from (France) US Ivry Handball

Leaving

- (Spain) Iosu Goñi Leoz (LB) to (France) Pau Billère Handball
- (France) Valentin Kieffer (GK) to (France) Limoges Handball
- (France) Hugo Pimenta (RB) to (France) Montpellier Handball

=== Transfer History ===
Transfers for the 2025–26 season

Joining

- (Iceland) Sveinn Jóhannsson (LP) from (Norway) Kolstad Håndball
- (Spain) Roberto Rodríguez (GK) from (Spain) BM Granollers
- (Slovenia) Matic Grošelj (RB) from (France) C' Chartres MHB
- (Portugal) André Sousa (CB) from (Portugal) FC Porto
- (France) Elio Zammit (LW) from (France) Pontault-Combault Handball

Leaving

- (Spain) Iñaki Peciña (LP) to (Spain) CD Bidasoa
- (Slovenia) Sebastian Skube (CB) to (France) C' Chartres MHB
- (Georgia (country)) Nikoloz Kalandadze (LB) to (France) Pays d'Aix Université Club
- (Brazil) Gustavo Rodrigues (RB) to (France) Cesson Rennes MHB
- (Bosnia and Herzegovina) Harun Hodžić (GK) to (France) USAM Nîmes Gard
- (France) Arthur Anquetil (LW) to (France) USAM Nîmes Gard

Transfers for the 2024–25 season

Joining

- (France) Adrien Vergely (LP) from (France) Pays d'Aix UC
- (France) Valentin Kieffer (GK) from (France) Dunkerque HGL
- (France) Hugo Pimenta (RB) from (France) Sélestat Alsace Handball
- (Czech Republic) Adam Tomášek (RB) from (Czech Republic) TJ Sokol Nové Veselí
- (Norway) Simen Holand Pettersen (LB) from (Denmark) Skjern Håndbold

Leaving

- (France) Hugo Brouzet (LP) to (France) Pays d'Aix UC
- (France) Antoine Tissot (RW) to (France) Pays d'Aix UC
- (France) Alexandre Tritta (RB) to (France) Pays d'Aix UC
- (Croatia) Filip Ivic (GK) to (North Macedonia) RK Eurofarm Pelister
- (France) Benjamin Richert (RW) to (France) Montpellier Handball

== Retired numbers ==
Chambéry Savoie Mont-Blanc Handball retired numbers
N°	Nationality	Player	Position	Tenure
9	(France)	Benjamin Gille	Line Player	2000–2018

== Honours ==
- France Handball League: 1

Champion : 2001.
Runner Up : 1998, 1999, 2000, 2002, 2003, 2006, 2008, 2009, 2010, 2011, 2012.

- Coupe de la Ligue: 1

Winner : 2002
Runner Up : 2011

- Trophée des Champions: 1

Winner : 2013
Runner Up : 2010, 2011, 2012

- Coupe de France: 1

Winner : 2019
Runner Up : 2002, 2005, 2009, 2011, 2014

- EHF Cup:

Semi-finalist : 2016

== European record ==
Season	Competition	Round	Club	1st leg	2nd leg	Aggregate
2015–16	EHF Cup	R2	(Slovakia) HC Sporta Hlohovec	35–12	31–28	66–40
2015–16	EHF Cup	R3	(Germany) Füchse Berlin	31–31	34–30	65–61
2015–16	EHF Cup	Group Stage	(Sweden) Ystads IF	32–22	27–26	1st place
2015–16	EHF Cup	Group Stage	(Spain) Helvetia Anaitasuna	26–23	28–22	1st place
2015–16	EHF Cup	Group Stage	(Romania) CSM Bucuresti	25–25	27–27	1st place
2015–16	EHF Cup	QF	(France) Saint-Raphael Var Handball	25–30	29–22	54–52
2015–16	EHF Cup	SF	(Germany) Frisch Auf Göppingen	25–28		

== Former club members ==
=== Notable former players ===
- (France) Arthur Anquetil (2018–)
- (France) Xavier Barachet (2006–2012)
- (France) Hugo Brouzet (2019–2024)
- (France) Laurent Busselier (2000–2013)
- (France) Grégoire Detrez (2008–2017)
- (France) Cyril Dumoulin (2000–2014)
- (France) Yann Genty (2014–2020)
- (France) Benjamin Gille (2000–2018)
- (France) Bertrand Gille (1996–2002, 2012–2015)
- (France) Guillaume Gille (1996–2002, 2012–2014)
- (France) Guillaume Joli (2004–2010)
- (France) Johannes Marescot (2011–2014, 2015–2020)
- (France) Olivier Marroux (2011–2014)
- (France) Julien Meyer (2016–2021)
- (France) Quentin Minel (2016–2019)
- (France) Laurent Munier (1999–2002)
- (France) Thimothey N'Guessan (2011–2016)
- (France) Daniel Narcisse (1998–2004, 2007–2009)
- (France) Alix Nyokas (2012–2014)
- (France) Émeric Paillasson (1997–2005)
- (France) Pierre Paturel (2005–)
- (France) Cédric Paty (2006–2016)
- (France) Jackson Richardson (2005–2008)
- (France) Melvyn Richardson (2005–2017)
- (France) Benjamin Richert (2018–)
- (France) Mickaël Robin (2008–2010)
- (France) (Qatar) Bertrand Roiné (2006–2012)
- (France) (Morocco) Seufyann Sayad (2002–2004)
- (France) Guillaume Saurina (2010–2011)
- (France) Stéphane Stoecklin (1985–1988, 2003–2005)
- (France) Queido Traoré (2012–)
- (France) Alexandre Tritta (2011–2024)
- (France) Marc Wiltberger (2001–2004)
- (Algeria) El Hadi Biloum (2005–2006)
- (Bosnia and Herzegovina) Edin Bašić (2017–2018)
- (Bosnia and Herzegovina) Marko Panić (2012–2017)
- (Brazil) João Pedro Silva (2015–2017)
- (Brazil) Gustavo Rodrigues (2021–)
- (Croatia) Damir Bičanić (2010–2017)
- (Croatia) Filip Ivić (2022–2024)
- (Croatia) Igor Kos (2000–2002)
- (Croatia) Jerko Matulić (2014–2016)
- (Croatia) Vlado Šola (2002–2004)
- (Czech Republic) Karel Nocar (2003–2013)
- (Spain) Alejandro Costoya (2018–)
- (Spain) Iosu Goñi Leoz (2020–)
- (Spain) Niko Mindegia (2017–2019)
- (Spain) Iñaki Peciña (2022–)
- (Germany) Volker Michel (2002–2003)
- (Hungary) Attila Borsos (1994–2000)
- (Hungary) Gábor Császár (2009–2010)
- (Lithuania) Gerdas Babarskas (2018–2022)
- (Montenegro) Fahrudin Melić (2016–2020)
- (Montenegro) (Serbia) Radivoje Ristanović (2016)
- (Romania) Demis Grigoraș (2019–2021)
- (Russia) Edouard Moskalenko (2001–2007)
- (Slovenia) Jure Natek (2007–2009)
- (Slovenia) Sebastian Skube (2021–)
- (Serbia) Zoran Đorđić (1995–1997)
- (Serbia) Nebojša Stojinović (2004–2008)
- (Serbia) Nenad Vučković (2004–2007)
- (Switzerland) Nikola Portner (2020–2022)

=== Former coaches ===
Seasons	Coach	Country
1996–2012	Philippe Gardent	(France)
2012–2014	Mario Cavalli	(France)
2014–2018	Ivica Obrvan	(Croatia)
2018–2024	Érick Mathé	(France)
2024–	Asier Antonio	(Spain)
