= Daniel Narcisse =

French handball player (born 1979)

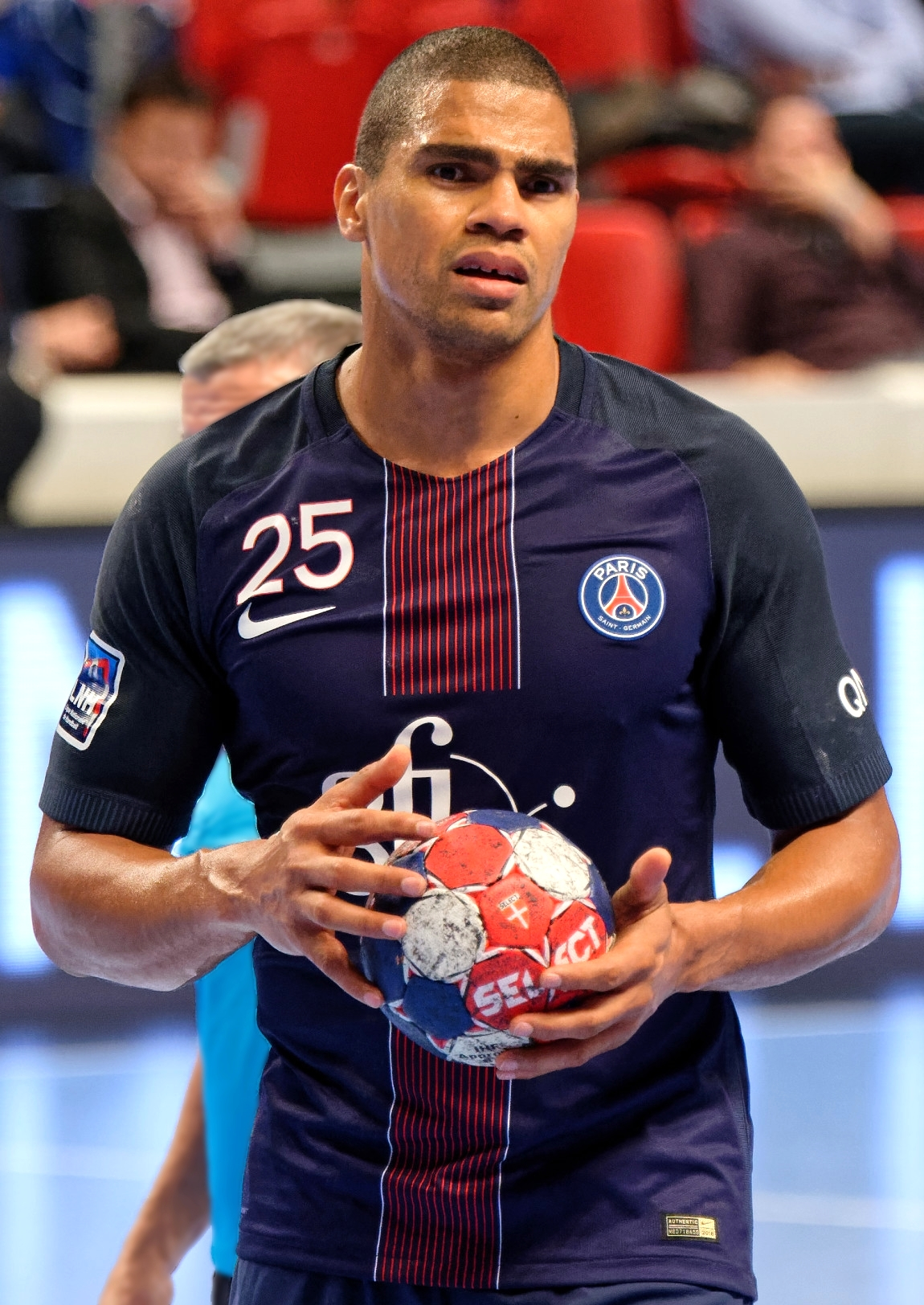
- Narcisse in 2016

Personal information
- Nationality: French
- Born: 16 December 1979 (age 46) Saint-Denis, Réunion
- Height: 1.89 m (6 ft 2 in)

Sport
- Sport: Handball
- Position: Centre back

Senior clubs
- Years: Team
- 1998–2004: Chambéry Savoie Handball
- 2004–2007: VfL Gummersbach
- 2007–2009: Chambéry Savoie Handball
- 2009–2013: THW Kiel
- 2013–2018: Paris Handball
National team
Years	Team	Apps	(Gls)
2000–2017	France	311	(943)
Medal record
Men's handball
Representing France
Olympic Games
Gold medal – first place	2008 Beijing	Team
Gold medal – first place	2012 London	Team
Silver medal – second place	2016 Rio de Janeiro	Team
World Championship
Gold medal – first place	2001 France
Gold medal – first place	2009 Croatia
Gold medal – first place	2015 Qatar
Gold medal – first place	2017 France
Bronze medal – third place	2003 Portugal
Bronze medal – third place	2005 Tunisia
European Championship
Gold medal – first place	2006 Switzerland
Gold medal – first place	2010 Austria
Gold medal – first place	2014 Denmark
Bronze medal – third place	2008 Norway
Mediterranean Games
Bronze medal – third place	2001 Tunis	Team

Daniel Narcisse (born 16 December 1979) is a retired French handball player and French international from 2000 to 2017. He is a double Olympic champion, quadruple World champion and triple European champion, one of the most awarded French team handball players with nine international titles. He could play both centre back and left back.

In 2012, with an exceptional year both in the French team (Olympic title) and in the club (Champions League, German championship and German cup), he was voted best handball player of the year 2012 by the International Handball Federation.

In 2023, he was included in the European Handball Federation Hall of Fame.

== Playing style ==
His main strength as a field player was his jumping ability, enabling him to score goals above interfering defense players. This ability earned him the nickname Air France.

== Career ==
=== Early career ===
Narcisse started playing handball at Joinville on Réunion, and joined Chambéry Savoie HB in 1998. Here he won French Championship and League Cup in 2001. In 2004 he joined German side VfL Gummersbach, despite being injured at the time.

=== Return to Chambery ===
In 2007 he returned to Chambéry. Gummersbach claimed that they had a unilateral right to extend the contract by one more year, and demanded 300.000 euros in transfer fee. At a court the clause was ruled invalid, and Narcisse was free to play for Chambéry Savoie HB.

=== THW Kiel ===
Narcisse joined THW Kiel in 2009, replacing Nikola Karabatic. Here he won the 2009-10 EHF Champions League and German Championship. In the 2010–11 season he was out for a long time with a cruciate ligament injury, but returned in time to win the 2011 DHB-Pokal, Super Globe and German Super Cup. In the 2011–2012 season he won the treble with Kiel; the EHF Champions League, German Champinoship and DHB-Pokal. THW Kiel even managed to win the season with all wins; 68 points out of 68 available. In August 2012 he followed it up by winning the German Super Cup once again. Later that season he also won the German Championship and Cup.

In 2012 he was named the IHF World Player of the Year.

=== Paris Saint-Germain ===
In 2013 he joined Paris Handball. Here he won the French Cup in 2014, 2015 and 2018 and the French championship four times in a row from 2015 to 2018. He retired after the 2017–18 season.

=== National team ===
Narcisse is a longtime player on the France men's national handball team, and won with it all major titles: world title (in 2001, 2009, 2015 and 2017), European title (in 2006, 2010 and 2014) and Olympic gold medal (in 2008 and 2012).

Narcisse was voted into the All star team at the 2008 European Men's Handball Championship, where France finished third.

== Titles ==
=== With club ===
- EHF Champions League
  - Winner: 2010, 2012
  - Runners-up: 2017
- IHF Super Globe
  - Winner: 2011 IHF Super Globe
- French Championship
  - Winner: 2001 (With Chambery), 2015, 2016, 2017, 2018 (With PSG)
  - Runners-up: 1000, 2000, 2002, 2003, 2008, 2009, 2014
- Coupe de France
  - Winner: 2014, 2015, 2018
  - Runners-up: 2016
- Coupe de la Ligue
  - Winner: 2002, 2017, 2018
  - Runners-up: 2016
- Trophée des Champions
  - Winner: 2014, 2015, 2016
- German Bundesliga
  - Winner: 2010, 2012, 2013
  - Runners-up: 2011
- German Cup
  - Winner: 2011, 2012, 2013
- German Supercup
  - Winner: 2011, 2012
  - Runners-up: 2009, 2010
