= Drago Vuković =

Croatian handball player (born 1983)

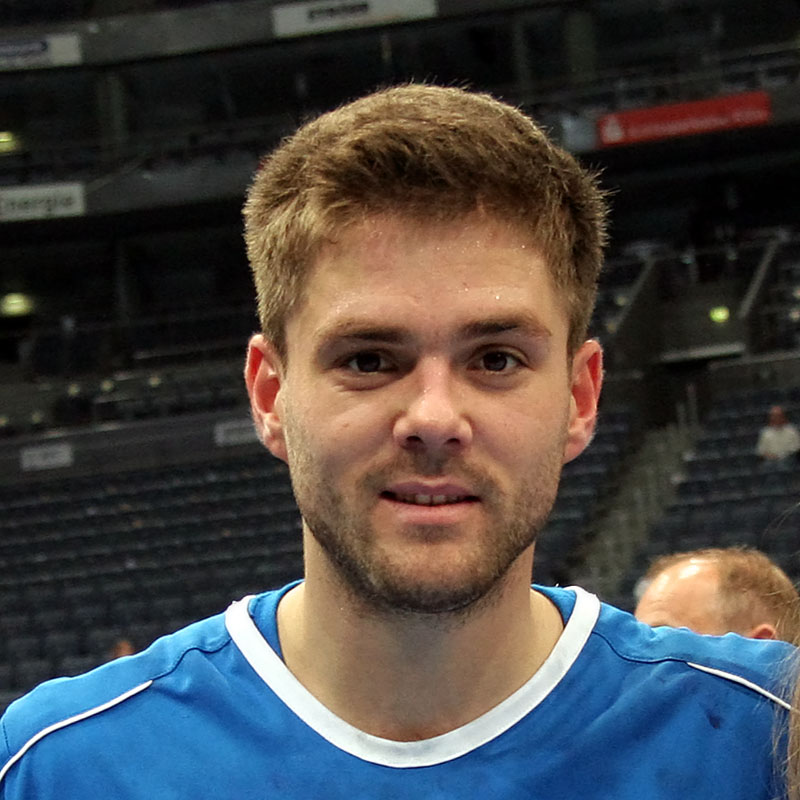

Personal information
- Nationality: Croatian
- Born: 3 August 1983 (age 43) Split, SFR Yugoslavia
- Height: 1.94 m (6 ft 4 in)

Sport
- Sport: Handball
- Position: Left back

Senior clubs
- Years: Team
- 2000-2002: RK Split
- 2002-2006: RK Zagreb
- 2006-2008: RK Gorenje Velenje
- 2008-2011: VfL Gummersbach
- 2011-2015: TuS Nettelstedt-Lübbecke
- 2015-2017: Füchse Berlin
- 2018-2019: VfL Gummersbach
National team
| Years | Team | Apps | (Gls) |
| 2004-2014 | Croatia | 157 | (210) |
Medal record
Olympic Games
| Gold medal – first place | 2004 Athens | Team |
| Bronze medal – third place | 2012 London | Team |
World Championship
| Bronze medal – third place | 2013 Spain | Team |
European Championship
| Silver medal – second place | 2008 Norway | Team |
| Silver medal – second place | 2010 Austria | Team competition |
| Bronze medal – third place | 2012 Serbia | Team |
Mediterranean Games
| Silver medal – second place | 2005 Almería | Team |

Drago Vuković (born 3 August 1983), is a former Croatian handball player. He is Olympic champion from 2004 with the Croatian national team, and he received a silver medal at the 2008 and 2010 European championships, and bronze medals at the 2012 Olympics, the 2013 World Championships and 2012 European Championships. He is the twin brother of the football player, the goalkeeper of RNK Split, Andrija Vuković.

After his club Gummersbach failed to retain Handball-Bundesliga position, Vuković decided to retire.

== Honours ==
Zagreb

- Croatian First League (4): 2002–03, 2003–04, 2004–05, 2005–06
- Handball Cup (4): 2003, 2004, 2005, 2006

Gummersbach

- EHF Cup (1): 2009
- EHF Cup Winner's Cup (2): 2010, 2011

Berlin

- IHF Super Globe (1): 2016
- EHF Cup: 2017-18
