= Daniel McMillan (handballer) =

British handball player

Personal information
- Nationality: British
- Born: 12 August 1982 (age 44) Broxburn
- Height: 189 cm (74 in)

Sport
- Sport: Handball
National team
- Years: Team
- –: Great Britain

Daniel McMillan (born 12 August 1982) is a British handball player. He was born in Broxburn in West Lothian, Scotland. He competed for the British national team at the 2012 Summer Olympics in London.

== Career ==
McMillan played American football before switching to handball after being recruited through the UK Sporting Giants scheme in 2007. He later played for TUSEM Essen along with several other members of the Team GB Handball squad.
