= Jeong Han =

South Korean handball player (born 1988)

- Hangul: 정한
- RR: Jeong Han
- MR: Chŏng Han

Jeong Han (born May 17, 1988) is a South Korean handball player. He was born in Seoul. He competed for the South Korean national team at the 2012 Summer Olympics in London.
