= Robin Garnham =

British handball player

Personal information
- Nationality: British, Swedish
- Born: 1 May 1988 (age 38) Karlstad, Sweden

Sport
- Sport: Handball

Senior clubs
- Years: Team
- –: IF Fram Larvik
National team
- Years: Team
- –: Great Britain

Robin Garnham (born 1 May 1988) is a British handball player. He was born in Karlstad, Sweden. He competed for the British national team at the 2012 Summer Olympics in London. He played for the Norwegian club Fram Larvik.

== Personal life ==
Garnham's father Stuart played professional football, relocating his family to Sweden.
