= Steven Larsson =

British handball player

Personal information
- Nationality: British
- Born: 1 May 1981 (age 45) Scarborough, North Yorkshire

Sport
- Sport: Handball
National team
- Years: Team
- –: Great Britain

Steven James Larsson (born 1 May 1981) is a British handball player. He was born in Scarborough in North Yorkshire but moved to Linköping in Sweden as a youngster.

He was eligible to compete for Sweden, Norway and Great Britain on a national level and opted for the country of his father. He played club handball in Norway and Switzerland.

Larsson competed for the British national team at the 2012 Summer Olympics in London. He scored three goals against Tunisia.

Following the Olympics, he competed again for Great Britain in 2015, playing in a 43–16 victory over Ireland.
