= Sebastien Edgar =

British handball player

Personal information
- Nationality: British
- Born: 26 May 1991 (age 35) Basildon
- Height: 182 m (597 ft)

Sport
- Sport: Handball
- Position: Right wing/back
- Current club: HB Kaerjeng
- Number: 31

Senior clubs
- Years: Team
- 2010-2012: USAM Nîmes Gard
- 2012-2019: Valence HB
- 2020-: Handball Käerjeng
National team
Years	Team	Apps	(Gls)
2008-	Great Britain	69	(312)

Sebastien Edgar (born 26 May 1991) is a British handball player. He was born in Basildon in Essex, England. He competed for the British national team at the 2012 Summer Olympics in London.

== Early life ==
Edgar moved to France at a young age and spent the majority of his childhood there. He practiced judo before taking up handball.

== Handball career ==
A right-sided player, Edgar played club handball in France with Nimes and Valence. For the 2019/20 season, he competed with Luxembourg-based Handball Käerjeng.

== International career ==
Edgar was a member of Great Britain's 2012 Olympic Handball squad. He scored in a match against Sweden. He remained a part of Team GB's squad, participating in Emerging Nations tournaments and Euro Qualifying.
