= Marcus Cleverly =

Danish handball player (born 1981)

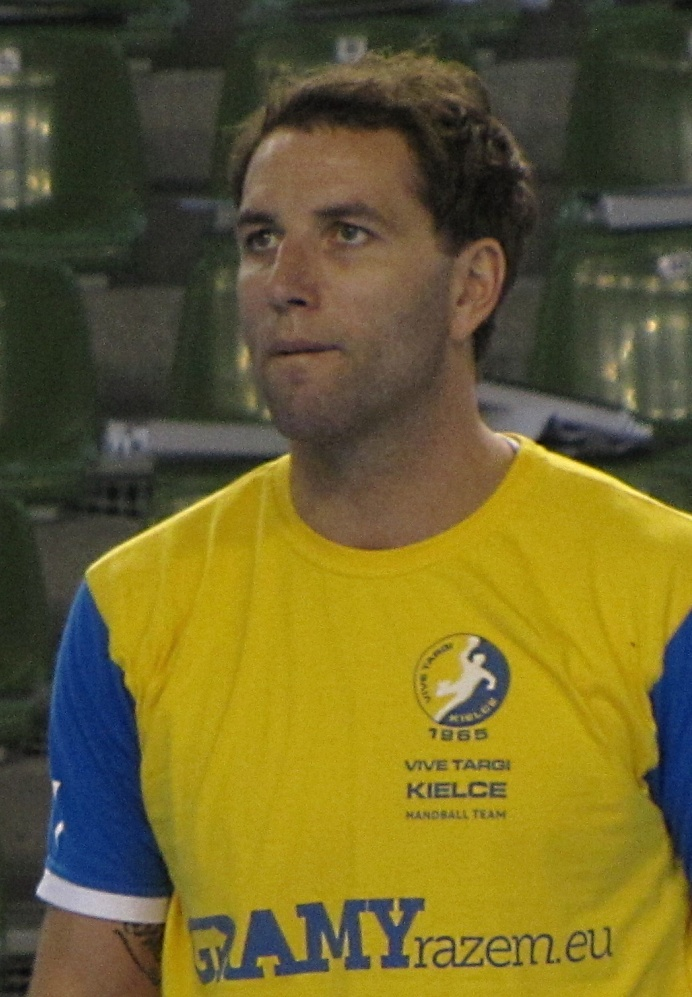

Personal information
- Full name: Marcus Cleverly
- Nationality: Danish
- Born: 15 June 1981 (age 45) Hillerød, Denmark
- Height: 1.88 m (6 ft 2 in)

Sport
- Sport: Handball
- Position: Goalkeeper
- Current club: IFK Ystad
- Number: 20

Senior clubs
- Years: Team
- 2001-2003: Team Helsinge (Denmark)
- 2003-2004: FCK Håndbold (Denmark)
- 2004-2005: TSG Ossweil (Germany)
- 2005-2009: TV Emsdetten (Germany)
- 2009-2013: Vive Targi Kielce (Poland)
- 2013: Lugi HF (Sweden)
- 2013-2014: HSV Hamburg (Germany)
- 2014-2018: KIF Kolding København (Denmark)
- 2018-: IFK Ystad (Sweden)
National team
Years	Team	Apps	(Gls)
2009-	Denmark	26	(0)
Medal record
Men's Handball
Representing Denmark
European Championships
Gold medal – first place	2012 Serbia	Team competition

Marcus Cleverly (born 15 June 1981, in Hillerød) is a Danish former handballer who played as a goalkeeper. He featured in the Danish national team.

He has played for Danish sides Team Helsinge, FCK Håndbold before moving to Germany, where he played for TSG Osswell and TV Emsdetten. He then moved to Polish side Vive Targi Kielce. He returned to Danish handball in 2014 with KIF Kolding København, where he played for 4 years. He moved from KIF Kolding København when the club broke up, and again became a club fully based in Kolding, Denmark. As his contract was expiring and he was based in Copenhagen, he decided to move on to Swedish handball.

Today he has his own company as a carpenter.
