= Guido Riccobelli =

Argentine handball player

Personal information
- Born: 28 November 1987 (age 38) Buenos Aires, Argentina

Sport
- Sport: Handball
- Position: Playmaker
- Current club: Handball Siena
- Number: 38

Senior clubs
- Years: Team
- –: UNLU
- –: River Plate
- 2008-2010: Secchia
- 2010-2014: SSV Bozen Loacker
- 2014-2015: UNLU
- 2015-2016: Junior Fasano
- 2016-2018: UNLU
- 2018: Junior Fasano
- 2018-2019: UNLU
- 2019-: Siena
National team
- Years: Team
- –: Argentina
Medal record
Pan American Championship
Bronze medal – third place	2016 Argentina

Guido Riccobelli (born 28 November 1987, Buenos Aires) is an Argentine handball player who plays for Italian team Handball Siena. He was born in Buenos Aires. He defended Argentina at the 2012 London Summer Olympics.
