= Great Britain men's national handball team =

Great Britain

Information
- Association: British Handball Association
- Coach: Ricardo Vasconcelos
- Most caps: Christopher McDermott (59)

Colours
1st	2nd
- Last updated on Unknown.

The Great Britain men's national handball team is the national handball team of Great Britain and is controlled by the British Handball Association which is jointly operated by the England Handball Association and the Scottish Handball Association.

Formed in 1969, the team took part in international competitions from 1972 to 2003. The team was reformed in order to participate in the 2012 Summer Olympics in London, for which it automatically qualified for as the host.

== Competitive record ==
=== Olympic Games ===
Olympic record
Games	Round	Position	Pld	W	D	L	GS	GA
(Germany) 1936 Berlin	did not compete							
Not held from 1948 to 1968
(West Germany) 1972 Munich	did not qualify							
(Canada) 1976 Montreal	did not qualify							
(Soviet Union) 1980 Moscow	did not compete							
(United States) 1984 Los Angeles	did not compete							
(South Korea) 1988 Seoul	did not compete							
(Spain) 1992 Barcelona	did not compete							
(United States) 1996 Atlanta	did not compete							
(Australia) 2000 Sydney	did not compete							
(Greece) 2004 Athens	did not compete							
(China) 2008 Beijing	did not compete							
(United Kingdom) 2012 London	Group stage	12th of 12	5	0	0	5	96	182
(Brazil) 2016 Rio de Janeiro	did not compete							
(Japan) 2020 Tokyo	did not compete							
Total	1/14	–	5	0	0	5	96	182

=== World Championships ===
World Championship record
Year	Round	Position	GP	W	D	L	GS	GA
(Germany) 1938	did not compete							
Not held from 1948 to 1968
(France) 1970	did not compete							
(East Germany) 1974	did not compete							
(Denmark) 1978	did not qualify							
(West Germany) 1982	did not qualify							
(Switzerland) 1986	did not qualify							
(Czechoslovakia) 1990	did not qualify							
(Sweden) 1993	did not compete							
(Iceland) 1995	did not compete							
(Japan) 1997	did not compete							
(Egypt) 1999	did not compete							
(France) 2001	did not compete							
(Portugal) 2003	did not compete							
(Tunisia) 2005	did not compete							
(Germany) 2007	did not compete							
(Croatia) 2009	did not compete							
(Sweden) 2011	did not qualify							
(Spain) 2013	did not qualify							
(Qatar) 2015	did not compete							
(France) 2017	did not compete							
(Denmark) / (Germany) 2019	did not compete							
(Egypt) 2021	did not compete							
(Poland) / (Sweden) 2023	did not compete							
(Croatia) / (Denmark) / (Norway) 2025	did not qualify							
(Germany) 2027	did not qualify							
(France) / (Germany) 2029	To be determined							
(Denmark) / (Iceland) / (Norway) 2031	To be determined							
Total	0/27							

=== European Championships ===
European Championship record
Year	Round	Position	GP	W	D	L	GS	GA
(Portugal) 1994	did not compete							
(Spain) 1996	did not compete							
(Italy) 1998	did not compete							
(Croatia) 2000	did not compete							
(Sweden) 2002	did not compete							
(Slovenia) 2004	did not compete							
(Switzerland) 2006	did not compete							
(Norway) 2008	did not compete							
(Austria) 2010	did not qualify							
(Serbia) 2012	did not qualify							
(Denmark) 2014	did not qualify							
(Poland) 2016	did not compete							
(Croatia) 2018	did not compete							
(Austria) (Norway) (Sweden) 2020	did not compete							
(Hungary) (Slovakia) 2022	did not compete							
(Germany) 2024	did not compete							
(Denmark) (Norway) (Sweden) 2026	did not qualify							
(Portugal) (Spain) (Switzerland) 2028	to be determined							
Total	0/18							

=== IHF Emerging Nations Championship ===
- 2015 – 9th place
- 2017 – 11th place
- 2019 – 4th place
- 2023 – 5th place
- 2025 – 1st place

== Squad ==
Head Coach: Ricardo Vasconcelos

Name	Club
Alex Bradley	Warrington Wolves
Sam Crocker	Brighton Seahawks
Sebastien Edgar	
Scott Frew	Ayr
Martin Hare	
Mark Hawkins	Ruislip Eagles
Christopher McDermott	Warrington Wolves
Will Moore	London GD
John Pearce	Poole Phoenix
Nick Satchwell	
Josh da Silva	Handball Academy, Aarhus
Rafik Tahraoui	Warrington Wolves
Ben Tyler	Deva
Liam Welsby	Warrington Wolves

== Previous Teams ==
=== Previous squads ===
The British Men's team took part in the 1984 World Championships Group C in Italy. The team finished 10th out of 12.

Number	Name	Club	Appearances	Goals
01	Stuart McPherson	Tryst '77	1	gk
02	Mick Hegarty	Liverpool	5	9
03	Tony Tropp	Brentwood '72	3	2
04	Paul Church	Liverpool	3	1
05	Michael O'Sullivan	Refstad	6	15
06	David O'Sullivan	Refstad	4	7
07	Stuart Cullan	Tryst '77	3	1
08	Larry Beard (capt)	Brentwood '72	5	7
09	Paul Dempsey	Brentwood '72	4	5
10	Paul Forester	Liverpool	3	1
11	Billy Hayburn	Brentwood '72	6	7
12	Dave Hendrick	Brentwood '72	6	gk
13	Steph Jones	Liverpool	6	6
14	Phil Church	Liverpool	6	13
15	Stan Horne	Birkenhead	5	20
16	Dave Henaghan	Liverpool	5	gk

A squad from 1989

Name	Club
Chris McManus	Tryst '77
Mark McLaughlin	Tryst '77
C Ireland	
Stuart Cullen	Tryst '77
B Mortley	
Alan Govan	Tryst '77
Tony Ditchfield	Liverpool
M Foo	
Mark Johnson	Liverpool
Mark Dowling	Liverpool

A squad from 2003

Name	Club
Stuart McLaughlin	Tryst '77
Stewart Clarke	Liverpool
Johnnie McAleer	Stirling
Freddy Wallace	Tryst '77
Stuart Cullen	Falkirk
Phil Nicholson	Tryst '77
Brian Bartlett	Tryst '77
Mark Dowling	Liverpool
James Yule	Falkirk
Alan Govan	Liverpool
Chris McManus	Liverpool
Mark Evans	Wirral
Bruce Hunter	Falkirk
David McCreadie	Stirling

=== Squad for 2012 Olympic Games ===
The following is the Great Britain roster in the men's handball tournament of the 2012 Summer Olympics.

Head coaches: Dragan Đukić

No.	Pos.	Name	Date of birth (age)	Height	App.	Goals	Club
1	GK	Jesper Parker	18 April 1984 (aged 28)	2.00 m			(Sweden) IK Sävehof
3	CB	Ciaran Williams	22 December 1987 (aged 24)	1.83 m			(United Kingdom) Salford HC
4	RW	Sebastian Prieto	4 February 1987 (aged 25)	1.87 m			(Norway) Viking HK
7	CB	Christopher Mohr	12 January 1990 (aged 22)	1.87 m			(Denmark) Odder Håndbold
12	GK	Robert White	5 April 1983 (aged 29)	1.92 m			(France) HB Valence
14	RB	Steven Larsson	1 May 1981 (aged 31)	1.95 m			(Norway) Drammen HK
15	LB	Martin Hare	28 November 1989 (aged 22)	1.93 m			(Norway) Viking HK
18	CB	Daniel McMillan	12 August 1982 (aged 29)	1.89 m			(Denmark) Odder Håndbold
20	LW	Mark Hawkins	28 December 1985 (aged 26)	1.82 m			(Iceland) Afturelding
21	P	Christopher McDermott	7 June 1989 (aged 23)	2.04 m			(Iceland) Afturelding
22	P	Robin Garnham	1 May 1988 (aged 24)	1.94 m			(Norway) Fram Larvik
26	RW	Sebastien Edgar	26 May 1991 (aged 21)	1.82 m			(France) LYS Nimes
27	LW	John Pearce	23 November 1987 (aged 24)	1.90 m			(Denmark) Brabrand
28	RB	Gawain Vincent	9 March 1990 (aged 22)	1.86 m			(France) HBC Nantes

=== Squad for the 2015 IHF Emerging Nations Championships in Kosovo ===
Name	Club
Alex Bradley	Warrington Wolves
Sam Crocker	Brighton Seahawks
Sebastien Edgar	
Scott Frew	Ayr
Martin Hare	
Mark Hawkins	Ruislip Eagles
Christopher McDermott	Warrington Wolves
Will Moore	London GD
John Pearce	Poole Phoenix
Nick Satchwell	
Josh da Silva	Handball Academy, Aarhus
Rafik Tahraoui	Warrington Wolves
Ben Tyler	Deva
Liam Welsby	Warrington Wolves

Data source

=== Previous coaches ===
Era	Name	Nationality	Associations
circa 1971–1974	Jorge Barke	German	Brentwood
1975–1976	Jeff Rowlands	British	BHA
1976–1979	Mike Briers	British	Birkenhead HC- BHA
1979–1980	Manfred Weiz	German	
1981–1982	Goran Gazivoda	Croatian	Brentwood '72
1982–1984	Mick Hegarty	British	Liverpool, Brentwood '72
1984–1986	Paul Rolls	British	Brentwood `72
1986– early 1990s	Bill Ballie	British	Tryst '77, Salford
2003-2004	Marco Cardinale	Italian	
2009 – Aug 2012	Dragan Djukic	Serbian	
Sept 2012 – 2013	Bill Baillie	British	Tryst '77, Salford
Jun 2015	Jesper Houmark	Danish	Danish Handball Federation
Jun 2017	Ricardo Vasconcelos	Portuguese	

=== Current ===
In the 2008–09 season, all the team players were signed with clubs on the European continent, with the exception of Omar Sani, who played in Egypt.

A special arrangement with insolvent German Handball-Bundesliga side TUSEM Essen provided the side with a number of players after most first-team players had left the club.

To further the development of its players, it also operated the British Handball Development academy in Denmark.

== Results ==
Year	Date	Opposition	Score	Venue	Competition
1969		Italy	12–30	Edge Hill College, Ormskirk	Friendly
1972		Luxembourg	12–37	Spain	Olympic Qualification (group stage)
1972		Spain	5–40	Spain	Olympic Qualification (group stage)
1972		Switzerland	2–37	Spain	Olympic Qualification (group stage)
1972		Italy	15–25	Spain	Olympic Qualification (play-off)
1972		Belgium	1–31	Spain	Olympic Qualification (play-off)
1974	Sep	Belgium	4–39	Belgium	Friendly
1975	Dec	Norway	5–55	Scotland	Olympic Qualification (group stage)
1976		Norway	12–43	Norway	Olympic Qualification (group stage)
1976	Feb	Poland	11–55	Picketts Lock	Olympic Qualification (group stage)
1976		Poland	5–43	Poland	Olympic Qualification (group stage)
1976	Dec	Portugal	8–42	Portugal	Group C World Championships
1976	Dec	Netherlands	8–36	Portugal	Group C World Championships
1976	Dec	Belgium	17–21	Portugal	Group C World Championships
1976	Dec	Faroe Isles	17–28	Portugal	Group C World Championships
1978	Jan	Israel	8–28	Great Britain	Friendly
1978	Jan	Israel	8–20	Great Britain	Friendly
1978	Jan	Ireland	24–10	Great Britain	Friendly
1978	Sep	Faroe Islands	11–41	Faroe Islands	Friendly
1978	Sep	Faroe Islands	13–35	Faroe Islands	Friendly
1980		Belgium	17–24	Faroe Islands	World Championship European C Group (pool B)
1980		France	8–48	Faroe Islands	World Championship European C Group (pool B)
1980		Israel	17–37	Faroe Islands	World Championship European C Group (pool B)
1980		Portugal	10–28	Faroe Islands	World Championship European C Group (pool B)
1980		Italy	17–31	Faroe Islands	World Championship European C Group (play-off 9th/10th)
1981	Nov	Belgium	11–34	Belgium	Friendly
1982	Feb	Bulgaria	13–25	Belgium	World Championship European C Group (pool A)
1982	Feb	Faroe Islands	10–26	Belgium	World Championship European C Group (pool A)
1982	Feb	Italy	15–27	Belgium	World Championship European C Group (pool A)
1982	Feb	Norway	11–42	Belgium	World Championship European C Group (pool A)
1982	Feb	Finland	9–38	Belgium	World Championship European C Group (play-off 9th/10th)
1983	Sep	Jordan	30–25	Jordan	Friendly
1983	Sep	Jordan	21–20	Jordan	Friendly
1983	Sep	Jordan	20–19	Jordan	Friendly
1983	Oct	Belgium	TBC	Belgium	Friendly
1983	Oct	Belgium	TBC	Belgium	Friendly
1983	Nov	Netherlands	TBC	Netherlands	Friendly
1983	Nov	Netherlands U21	TBC	Netherlands	Friendly
1983	Dec	Luxembourg	TBC	Luxembourg	Friendly
1984	27 Jan	Austria	14–26	Vienna	Friendly
1984	29 Jan	Austria	12–31	Vienna	Friendly
1984	Feb	Austria	12–32	Brixen, Italy	World Championship European C Group (pool B)
1984	Feb	Netherlands	13–22	Rovereto, Italy	World Championship European C Group (pool B)
1984	Feb	Faroe Islands	21–19	Rovereto, Italy	World Championship European C Group (pool B)
1984	Feb	Bulgaria	15–38	Brixen, Italy	World Championship European C Group (pool B)
1984	Feb	Turkey	15–25	Brixen, Italy	World Championship European C Group (pool B)
1984	Feb	Belgium	20–27	Rome, Italy	World Championship European C Group (play-off 9th/10th)
1986	Feb	France	16–39	Portugal	World Championship European C Group
1986	Feb	Austria	13–26	Portugal	World Championship European C Group
1986	Feb	Portugal	11–40	Portugal	World Championship European C Group
1986	Feb	Luxembourg	19–16	Portugal	World Championship European C Group
1986	Feb	Greece	19–23	Portugal	World Championship European C Group
1987	Aug	Egypt	TBC	Portugal	Friendly International Tournament
1987	Aug	Portugal	TBC	Portugal	Friendly International Tournament
1987	Aug	Tunisia	TBC	Portugal	Friendly International Tournament
1988	Feb	Belgium	18–28	Portugal	World Championship European C Group
1988	Feb	Netherlands	12–34	Portugal	World Championship European C Group
1988	Feb	Austria	15–37	Portugal	World Championship European C Group
1988	Feb	Turkey	11–28	Portugal	World Championship European C Group
1999	14 Sep	Ireland	34–11	Nicosia (Cyprus)	Challenge Trophy
1999	15 Sep	Malta	34–8	Nicosia (Cyprus)	Challenge Trophy
1999	16 Sep	Cyprus	10–27	Nicosia (Cyprus)	Challenge Trophy
1999	17 Sep	Moldova	22–32	Nicosia (Cyprus)	Challenge Trophy
1999	18 Sep	Armenia	29–19	Nicosia (Cyprus)	Challenge Trophy
1999	19 Sep	Armenia	30–20	Nicosia (Cyprus)	Challenge Trophy (play-off 3rd/4th)
2003	17 Dec	Moldova	9–38	Msida (Malta)	Challenge Trophy
2003	18 Dec	Liechtenstein	27–23	Msida (Malta)	Challenge Trophy
2003	18 Dec	Azerbaijan	14–29	Msida (Malta)	Challenge Trophy
2003	19 Dec	Malta	19–16	Msida (Malta)	Challenge Trophy
2003	20 Dec	Ireland	26–12	Msida (Malta)	Challenge Trophy
2003	19 Dec	Malta	19–16	Msida (Malta)	Challenge Trophy (play-off 3rd/4th)
2007	Jan	Australia	14–37	Rødding, Denmark	Friendly
2007	Jan	Australia	15–33	Rødding, Denmark	Friendly
2008	Oct	Sultanate of Oman	23–29	Muscat	Friendly
2008	Oct	Sultanate of Oman	28–22	Muscat	Friendly
2008	Oct	Sultanate of Oman	20–27	Muscat	Friendly
2009	12 Jun	Greece	26–33		Friendly
2009	15 Jun	Greece	20–35		Friendly
2009	Aug	Japan	22–35	Istres (FRA)	Friendly
2009	Aug	Algeria	19–29	Istres (FRA)	Friendly
2009	29 Oct	Luxembourg	32–32	Luxembourg	Friendly
2009	30 Oct	Belgium	23–25	Luxembourg	Friendly
2010	2 Jan	Switzerland	18–33	Winterthur (SUI)	Yellow-Cup
2010	3 Jan	Tunisia	24–42	Winterthur (SUI)	Yellow-Cup
2010	4 Jan	Netherlands	21–39	Winterthur (SUI)	Yellow-Cup
2010	8 Jan	Tunisia	23–33	Paris (FRA)	Marrane-Cup
2010	9 Jan	Qatar	26–38	Paris (FRA)	Marrane-Cup
2010	10 Jan	Czech Republic	22–32	Paris (FRA)	Marrane-Cup
2010	15 Jan	Romania	27–36	Vantaa (FIN)	World Cup Qualifier
2010	16 Jan	Bosnia	19–44	Vantaa (FIN)	World Cup Qualifier
2010	17 Jan	Finland	21–35	Vantaa (FIN)	World Cup Qualifier
2010	4 Jun	Belgium	26–24	Brussels (BEL)	Friendly
2010	5 Jun	Belgium	22–36	Brussels (BEL)	Friendly
2010	10 Jun	Cyprus	16–24	London (UK)	European Championship Qualifier
2010	11 Jun	Estonia	26–35	London (UK)	European Championship Qualifier
2010	12 Jun	Bulgaria	33–32	London (UK)	European Championship Qualifier
2011	2 Nov	Israel	26–29	London (UK)	World Championship Qualifier
2011	6 Nov	Israel	20–29	Rishion Le Zion(ISR)	World Championship Qualifier
2012	5 Jan	Austria	22–37	Tulln (Austria)	World Championship Qualifier
2012	8 Jan	Austria	24–40	London (UK)	World Championship Qualifier
2012	8 Jun	Switzerland	21–38	Bari (IT)	European Championship Qualifier
2012	9 Jun	Greece	30–35	Bari (IT)	European Championship Qualifier
2012	10 Jun	Italy	29–26	Bari (IT)	European Championship Qualifier
2012	29 Jul	France	15–44	London (UK)	Olympic Group A
2012	31 Jul	Sweden	19–41	London (UK)	Olympic Group A
2012	2 Aug	Argentina	21–32	London (UK)	Olympic Group A
2012	4 Aug	Tunisia	17–34	London (UK)	Olympic Group A
2012	6 Aug	Iceland	24–41	London (UK)	Olympic Group A
2012	31 Oct	Greece	14–43	Loutraki (GRE)	European Championship Qualifier
2013	4 Apr	Italy	23–47	Motherwell (UK)	European Championship Qualifier
2013	7 Apr	Greece	20–32	London (UK)	European Championship Qualifier
2013	6 Jun	Italy	26–37	Lavis (IT)	European Championship Qualifier
2015	20 Jun	Estonia	27–26	Prishtina (Kosovo)	Emerging Nations Men's Championship
2015	21 Jun	Cameroon	16–23	Prishtina (Kosovo)	Emerging Nations Men's Championship
2015	22 Jun	Albania	67–22	Prishtina (Kosovo)	Emerging Nations Men's Championship
2015	24 Jun	Armenia	38–20	Gjakova (Kosovo)	Emerging Nations Men's Championship
2015	25 Jun	Australia	32–26	Gjakova (Kosovo)	Emerging Nations Men's Championship
2015	26 Jun	China	28–22	Gjakova (Kosovo)	Emerging Nations Men's Championship
2015	29 Aug	Ireland	43–16	London (UK)	

Data sources 1969 ; 1976 ; 2008

== See also ==
- Great Britain women's national handball team
- Handball at the 2012 Summer Olympics
