= Christopher McDermott =

British handball player (born 1989)

Personal information
- Nationality: British
- Born: 7 June 1989 (age 37) Birkenhead, United Kingdom
- Height: 2.04 m (6 ft 8 1/2 in)

Sport
- Sport: Handball
- Position: Line Player/Back
- Current club: Warrington Wolves Handball Club
- Number: 42

Senior clubs
- Years: Team
- –: UMF Afturelding
- –: R.D. Slovan
- –: Aarhus G.F.
- –: TUSEM Essen
National team
- Years: Team
- 2006–2016: Great Britain

Christopher McDermott (born 7 June 1989) is a British handball player. He competed as part of Team GB at the 2012 London Olympic Games. He currently coaches the GB Men's Under 20s handball club. Past clubs include R.D. Slovan of Slovenia, Danish Liga side Aarhus G.F. and German Bundasliga side TUSEM Essen. In June 2015 he became the Great Britain handball team's most-capped player, surpassing Mick Hegarty's long-standing record of 55 caps set in the 1980s.

== Biography ==
=== Early Life ===
McDermott was born on 7 June, 1989 in Birkenhead, UK. After playing for the Wirral Handball Club since the age of 10, McDermott was selected to move to Denmark as part of the GB Handball teams centralized program at age 16. After progressing through the ranks of the Danish handball youth club, McDermott was granted a move to Germany to play for TUSEM Essen. He has since played for Aarhus GF Håndbold, RD Slovan, UMF Afturelding and the Warrington Wolves (Note: Not to be confused with the Warrington Wolves rugby team.) handball club (HC).

In May 2012 McDermott was selected for the London 2012 Summer Olympics. He suffered a ruptured muscle the day before the opening ceremonies, but managed to play through the injury and proceeded to play a major part in each of Team GB's matches at the games Team GB competed against France, Sweden, Argentina, Tunisia and Iceland, where GB was unable to record a win despite having risen through the world rankings.

McDermott and his Warrington Wolves teammates have since broken the dominance expatriate players had previously held in British handball leagues. With a team consisting of solely British players, the Wolves have risen to the top of the English Handball Premier League with successive League and Cup doubles and victory in the British Cup.
