= Handball at the 2012 Summer Olympics – Men's tournament =

Men's handball at the Games of the XXX Olympiad

Tournament details
- Host country: United Kingdom
- Dates: 29 July – 12 August 2012
- Teams: 12 (from 4 confederations)

Final positions
- Champions: France (2nd title)
- Runners-up: Sweden
- Third place: Croatia
- Fourth place: Hungary

Tournament statistics
- Matches played: 38
- Goals scored: 1,983 (52.18 per match)
- Attendance: 209,625 (5,516 per match)
- Top scorer(s): (Sweden) Niclas Ekberg (50 goals)

The men's handball tournament at the 2012 Olympic Games in London was held from 28 July to 12 August at the Olympic Park. The group stage matches were held at the Copper Box and the knockout rounds took place at the larger Basketball Arena.

Twelve nations were represented in the tournament. The four best teams from each group advanced to a quarter-final round, while the 5th and 6th teams in each group were classified 9th–12th by the results of their group matches. Unlike in previous Olympics there was no placement matches involving the losing teams of the quarter-finals.

The medals for the competition were presented by Austin Sealy, Barbados, IOC Member, Gunilla Lindberg, Sweden, IOC Executive Board Member, and Sheikh Ahmad Al-Fahad Al-Sabah, Kuwait, IOC Member, and the medalists' bouquets were presented by Hassan Moustafa, IHF President, Egypt, Miguel Roca Mas, 1st IHF Vice President, Spain, and Leon Kalin, Slovenia, IHF Commission of Organising and Competitions.

== Qualification ==
	Date	Venue	Vacancies	Qualified
Host nation			1	Great Britain
2011 World Championship	13–30 January 2011	Sweden	1	France
2011 Pan American Games	16–24 October 2011	Mexico	1	Argentina
Asian Olympic Qualification Tournament 2011	23 October – 2 November 2011	South Korea	1	South Korea
2012 African Championship	11–20 January 2012	Morocco	1	Tunisia
2012 European Championship	15–29 January 2012	Serbia	1	Denmark
2012 IHF Qualification Tournament #1	6–8 April 2012	Spain	2	Spain; Serbia
2012 IHF Qualification Tournament #2	6–8 April 2012	Sweden	2	Sweden; Hungary
2012 IHF Qualification Tournament #3	6–8 April 2012	Croatia	2	Croatia; Iceland
Total			12	

=== Seeding ===
Before the draw the IHF seeded the teams in six pots. The draw for the groups was held on 30 May 2012.

Pot 1	Pot 2	Pot 3	Pot 4	Pot 5	Pot 6
France	Sweden	Iceland	Serbia	Denmark	South Korea
Spain	Croatia	Hungary	Great Britain	Argentina	Tunisia

== Group stage ==
=== Group A ===
Team	Pld	W	D	L	GF	GA	GD	Pts	Qualification
Iceland	5	5	0	0	167	132	+35	10	Quarter-finals
France	5	4	0	1	159	110	+49	8	Quarter-finals
Sweden	5	3	0	2	156	115	+41	6	Quarter-finals
Tunisia	5	2	0	3	121	125	−4	4	Quarter-finals
Argentina	5	1	0	4	113	138	−25	2	
Great Britain	5	0	0	5	96	192	−96	0	

29 July 2012; 09:30	Iceland	31 – 25	Argentina	Copper Box, London; Attendance: 3,701; Referees: Geipel, Helbig (GER)
29 July 2012; 09:30	Sigurðsson 9	(15–14)	D. Simonet 5	Copper Box, London; Attendance: 3,701; Referees: Geipel, Helbig (GER)
29 July 2012; 09:30	3× (yellow card) 6× (suspension)	Report	3× (yellow card) 1× (suspension)	Copper Box, London; Attendance: 3,701; Referees: Geipel, Helbig (GER)

29 July 2012; 14:30	Sweden	28 – 21	Tunisia	Copper Box, London; Attendance: 4,155; Referees: Raluy López, Sabroso (ESP)
29 July 2012; 14:30	Doder 8	(16–11)	Boughanmi 6	Copper Box, London; Attendance: 4,155; Referees: Raluy López, Sabroso (ESP)
29 July 2012; 14:30	3× (yellow card) 4× (suspension)	Report	3× (yellow card) 5× (suspension)	Copper Box, London; Attendance: 4,155; Referees: Raluy López, Sabroso (ESP)

29 July 2012; 19:30	France	44 – 15	Great Britain	Copper Box, London; Attendance: 5,000; Referees: Abdulla, Bamutref (QAT)
29 July 2012; 19:30	Joli 11	(21–7)	Garnham 6	Copper Box, London; Attendance: 5,000; Referees: Abdulla, Bamutref (QAT)
29 July 2012; 19:30	2× (yellow card) 2× (suspension)	Report	3× (yellow card) 4× (suspension) 1× (red card)	Copper Box, London; Attendance: 5,000; Referees: Abdulla, Bamutref (QAT)

31 July 2012; 09:30	Tunisia	22 – 32	Iceland	Copper Box, London; Attendance: 3,559; Referees: Al-Nuaimi, Omar (UAE)
31 July 2012; 09:30	Bannour 10	(8–19)	Pálmarsson 8	Copper Box, London; Attendance: 3,559; Referees: Al-Nuaimi, Omar (UAE)
31 July 2012; 09:30	4× (yellow card) 3× (suspension)	Report	4× (yellow card) 5× (suspension)	Copper Box, London; Attendance: 3,559; Referees: Al-Nuaimi, Omar (UAE)

31 July 2012; 14:30	Great Britain	19 – 41	Sweden	Copper Box, London; Attendance: 4,382; Referees: Nikolić, Stojković (SRB)
31 July 2012; 14:30	Larsson 4	(10–24)	Ekberg 13	Copper Box, London; Attendance: 4,382; Referees: Nikolić, Stojković (SRB)
31 July 2012; 14:30	3× (yellow card) 6× (suspension) 1× (red card)	Report	3× (yellow card) 4× (suspension)	Copper Box, London; Attendance: 4,382; Referees: Nikolić, Stojković (SRB)

31 July 2012; 21:15	Argentina	20 – 32	France	Copper Box, London; Attendance: 3,906; Referees: Olesen, Peders (DEN)
31 July 2012; 21:15	Fernández, Riccobelli 4	(9–17)	Karabatić 7	Copper Box, London; Attendance: 3,906; Referees: Olesen, Peders (DEN)
31 July 2012; 21:15	3× (yellow card) 2× (suspension)	Report	3× (yellow card) 2× (suspension)	Copper Box, London; Attendance: 3,906; Referees: Olesen, Peders (DEN)

2 August 2012; 11:15	France	25 – 19	Tunisia	Copper Box, London; Attendance: 4,670; Referees: Nikolić, Stojković (SRB)
2 August 2012; 11:15	Narcisse 7	(12–11)	Bannour 5	Copper Box, London; Attendance: 4,670; Referees: Nikolić, Stojković (SRB)
2 August 2012; 11:15	4× (yellow card) 5× (suspension)	Report	4× (yellow card) 7× (suspension)	Copper Box, London; Attendance: 4,670; Referees: Nikolić, Stojković (SRB)

2 August 2012; 16:15	Great Britain	21–32	Argentina	Copper Box, London; Attendance: 4,581; Referees: Coulibaly, Diabate (CIV)
2 August 2012; 16:15	Larsson 6	(11–16)	Simonet 6	Copper Box, London; Attendance: 4,581; Referees: Coulibaly, Diabate (CIV)
2 August 2012; 16:15	4× (yellow card) 4× (suspension)	Report	3× (yellow card) 3× (suspension)	Copper Box, London; Attendance: 4,581; Referees: Coulibaly, Diabate (CIV)

2 August 2012; 21:15	Sweden	32 – 33	Iceland	Copper Box, London; Attendance: 4,590; Referees: Nachevski, Nikolov (MKD)
2 August 2012; 21:15	Källman 9	(13–17)	Pálmarsson 9	Copper Box, London; Attendance: 4,590; Referees: Nachevski, Nikolov (MKD)
2 August 2012; 21:15	3× (yellow card) 3× (suspension)	Report	3× (yellow card) 8× (suspension)	Copper Box, London; Attendance: 4,590; Referees: Nachevski, Nikolov (MKD)

4 August 2012; 09:30	Tunisia	34 – 17	Great Britain	Copper Box, London; Attendance: 4,319; Referees: Gubica, Milošević (CRO)
4 August 2012; 09:30	Toumi 10	(14–8)	Edgar 5	Copper Box, London; Attendance: 4,319; Referees: Gubica, Milošević (CRO)
4 August 2012; 09:30	3× (yellow card) 5× (suspension)	Report	3× (yellow card) 6× (suspension)	Copper Box, London; Attendance: 4,319; Referees: Gubica, Milošević (CRO)

4 August 2012; 14:30	Sweden	29 – 13	Argentina	Copper Box, London; Attendance: 4,592; Referees: López, Sabroso (ESP)
4 August 2012; 14:30	Ekberg 9	(12–8)	Simonet 3	Copper Box, London; Attendance: 4,592; Referees: López, Sabroso (ESP)
4 August 2012; 14:30	4× (yellow card) 1× (suspension)	Report	3× (yellow card) 2× (suspension)	Copper Box, London; Attendance: 4,592; Referees: López, Sabroso (ESP)

4 August 2012; 19:30	Iceland	30 – 29	France	Copper Box, London; Attendance: 4,521; Referees: Krstić, Ljubić (SLO)
4 August 2012; 19:30	Petersson 6	(16–15)	Fernandez 9	Copper Box, London; Attendance: 4,521; Referees: Krstić, Ljubić (SLO)
4 August 2012; 19:30	3× (yellow card) 7× (suspension)	Report	2× (yellow card) 4× (suspension)	Copper Box, London; Attendance: 4,521; Referees: Krstić, Ljubić (SLO)

6 August 2012; 11:15	Argentina	23 – 25	Tunisia	Copper Box, London; Attendance: 4,645; Referees: Olesen, Pedersen (DEN)
6 August 2012; 11:15	Simonet 6	(12–12)	Alouini 7	Copper Box, London; Attendance: 4,645; Referees: Olesen, Pedersen (DEN)
6 August 2012; 11:15	2× (yellow card) 7× (suspension) 1× (red card)	Report	3× (yellow card) 6× (suspension) 1× (red card)	Copper Box, London; Attendance: 4,645; Referees: Olesen, Pedersen (DEN)

6 August 2012; 16:15	Iceland	41 – 24	Great Britain	Copper Box, London; Attendance: 4,856; Referees: Abdulla, Bamutref (QAT)
6 August 2012; 16:15	Sigurðsson 8	(18–15)	Larsson 9	Copper Box, London; Attendance: 4,856; Referees: Abdulla, Bamutref (QAT)
6 August 2012; 16:15	3× (yellow card) 4× (suspension)	Report	3× (yellow card) 5× (suspension)	Copper Box, London; Attendance: 4,856; Referees: Abdulla, Bamutref (QAT)

6 August 2012; 21:15	France	29 – 26	Sweden	Copper Box, London; Attendance: 4,833; Referees: Gubica, Milošević (CRO)
6 August 2012; 21:15	Narcisse 6	(18–12)	Ekberg, Andersson 5	Copper Box, London; Attendance: 4,833; Referees: Gubica, Milošević (CRO)
6 August 2012; 21:15	3× (yellow card) 1× (suspension)	Report	3× (yellow card) 2× (suspension)	Copper Box, London; Attendance: 4,833; Referees: Gubica, Milošević (CRO)

=== Group B ===
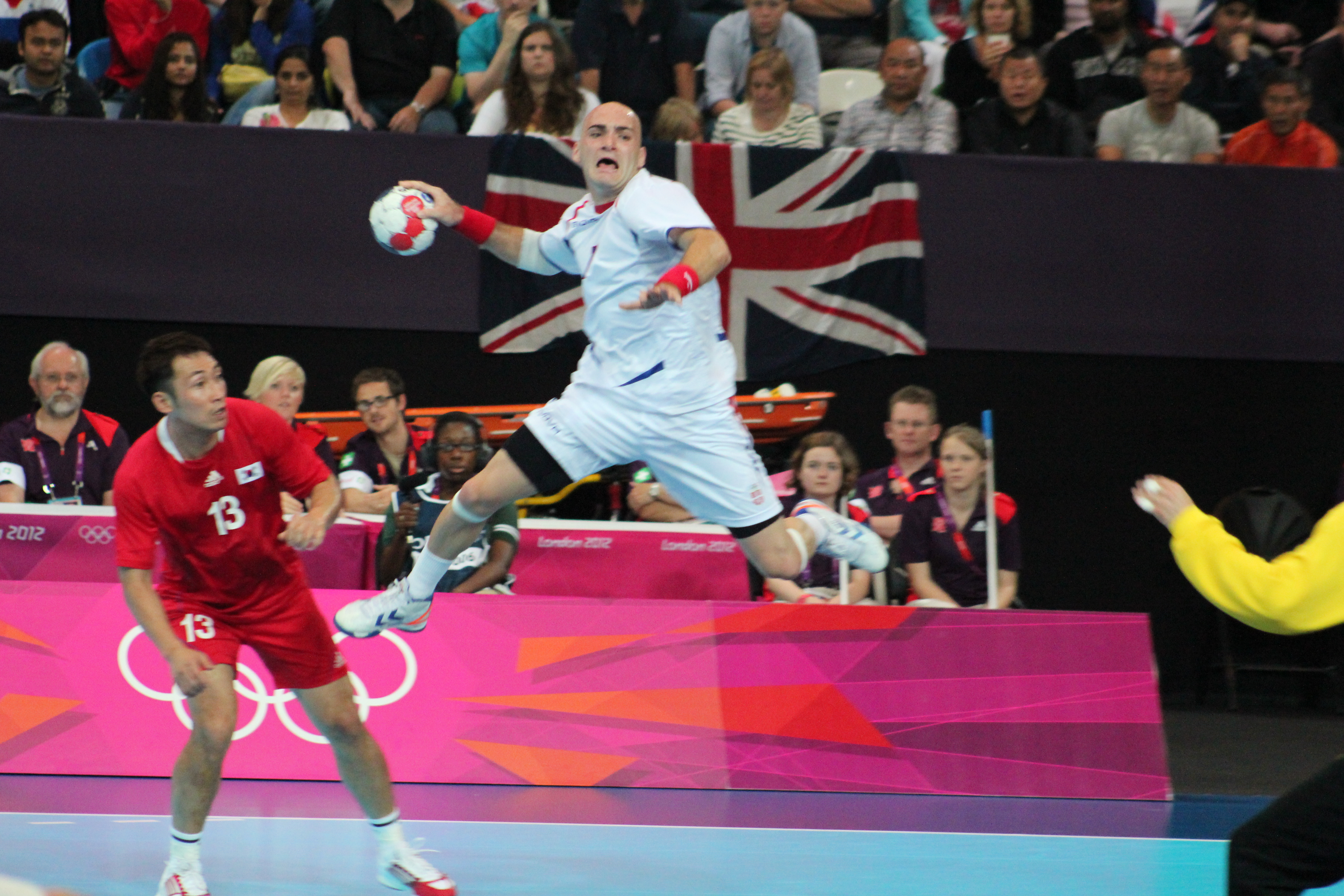
South Korea v Serbia

Team	Pld	W	D	L	GF	GA	GD	Pts	Qualification
Croatia	5	5	0	0	150	109	+41	10	Quarter-finals
Denmark	5	4	0	1	124	129	−5	8	Quarter-finals
Spain	5	3	0	2	140	126	+14	6	Quarter-finals
Hungary	5	2	0	3	114	128	−14	4	Quarter-finals
Serbia	5	1	0	4	120	131	−11	2	
South Korea	5	0	0	5	115	140	−25	0	

29 July 2012; 11:15	Croatia	31 – 21	South Korea	Copper Box, London; Attendance: 4,068; Referees: Marina, Minore (ARG)
29 July 2012; 11:15	Čupić 8	(14–8)	Jeong Yi-kyeong 5	Copper Box, London; Attendance: 4,068; Referees: Marina, Minore (ARG)
29 July 2012; 11:15	1× (yellow card) 4× (suspension)	Report	2× (yellow card) 6× (suspension)	Copper Box, London; Attendance: 4,068; Referees: Marina, Minore (ARG)

29 July 2012; 16:15	Spain	26 – 21	Serbia	Copper Box, London; Attendance: 4,600; Referees: Abrahamsen, Kristiansen (NOR)
29 July 2012; 16:15	Sarmiento Melián 5	(10–14)	Ilić 6	Copper Box, London; Attendance: 4,600; Referees: Abrahamsen, Kristiansen (NOR)
29 July 2012; 16:15	3× (yellow card) 5× (suspension)	Report	3× (yellow card) 5× (suspension)	Copper Box, London; Attendance: 4,600; Referees: Abrahamsen, Kristiansen (NOR)

29 July 2012; 21:15	Hungary	25 – 27	Denmark	Copper Box, London; Attendance: 5,000; Referees: Lazaar, Reveret (FRA)
29 July 2012; 21:15	Császár 8	(10–13)	Eggert 9	Copper Box, London; Attendance: 5,000; Referees: Lazaar, Reveret (FRA)
29 July 2012; 21:15	1× (yellow card) 7× (suspension)	Report	3× (yellow card) 5× (suspension)	Copper Box, London; Attendance: 5,000; Referees: Lazaar, Reveret (FRA)

31 July 2012; 11:15	South Korea	19 – 22	Hungary	Copper Box, London; Attendance: 4,262; Referees: Nachevski, Nikolov (MKD)
31 July 2012; 11:15	Jeong Yi-kyeong, Jeong Han 4	(9–7)	Lékai 5	Copper Box, London; Attendance: 4,262; Referees: Nachevski, Nikolov (MKD)
31 July 2012; 11:15	4× (yellow card) 3× (suspension)	Report	4× (yellow card) 4× (suspension)	Copper Box, London; Attendance: 4,262; Referees: Nachevski, Nikolov (MKD)

31 July 2012; 16:15	Serbia	23 – 31	Croatia	Copper Box, London; Attendance: 4,827; Referees: Horáček, Novotný (CZE)
31 July 2012; 16:15	Vujin 6	(9–13)	Čupić 8	Copper Box, London; Attendance: 4,827; Referees: Horáček, Novotný (CZE)
31 July 2012; 16:15	4× (yellow card) 3× (suspension)	Report	3× (yellow card) 4× (suspension)	Copper Box, London; Attendance: 4,827; Referees: Horáček, Novotný (CZE)

31 July 2012; 19:30	Denmark	24 – 23	Spain	Copper Box, London; Attendance: 4,368; Referees: Krstić, Ljubić (SLO)
31 July 2012; 19:30	Hansen 8	(13–12)	three players 4	Copper Box, London; Attendance: 4,368; Referees: Krstić, Ljubić (SLO)
31 July 2012; 19:30	4× (yellow card) 6× (suspension)	Report	4× (yellow card) 1× (suspension)	Copper Box, London; Attendance: 4,368; Referees: Krstić, Ljubić (SLO)

2 August 2012; 09:30	Spain	33 – 29	South Korea	Copper Box, London; Attendance: 4,209; Referees: Lazaar, Reveret (FRA)
2 August 2012; 09:30	Ugalde 6	(16–14)	Lee Jae-woo 8	Copper Box, London; Attendance: 4,209; Referees: Lazaar, Reveret (FRA)
2 August 2012; 09:30	3× (yellow card) 4× (suspension)	Report	2× (yellow card) 8× (suspension)	Copper Box, London; Attendance: 4,209; Referees: Lazaar, Reveret (FRA)

2 August 2012; 14:30	Croatia	26 – 19	Hungary	Copper Box, London; Attendance: 4,950; Referees: Abrahamsen, Kristiansen (NOR)
2 August 2012; 14:30	Čupić 7	(11–9)	Császár, Nagy 4	Copper Box, London; Attendance: 4,950; Referees: Abrahamsen, Kristiansen (NOR)
2 August 2012; 14:30	3× (yellow card) 6× (suspension)	Report	3× (yellow card) 2× (suspension)	Copper Box, London; Attendance: 4,950; Referees: Abrahamsen, Kristiansen (NOR)

2 August 2012; 19:30	Serbia	25 – 26	Denmark	Copper Box, London; Attendance: 4,504; Referees: Geipel, Helbig (GER)
2 August 2012; 19:30	Vujin 7	(11–13)	Hansen 7	Copper Box, London; Attendance: 4,504; Referees: Geipel, Helbig (GER)
2 August 2012; 19:30	3× (yellow card) 7× (suspension)	Report	2× (yellow card) 3× (suspension)	Copper Box, London; Attendance: 4,504; Referees: Geipel, Helbig (GER)

4 August 2012; 11:15	South Korea	22 – 28	Serbia	Copper Box, London; Attendance: 4,525; Referees: Bonaventura, Bonaventura (FRA)
4 August 2012; 11:15	Jeong Han 6	(10–12)	Nikčević, Toskić 5	Copper Box, London; Attendance: 4,525; Referees: Bonaventura, Bonaventura (FRA)
4 August 2012; 11:15	3× (yellow card) 2× (suspension)	Report	6× (yellow card) 1× (suspension)	Copper Box, London; Attendance: 4,525; Referees: Bonaventura, Bonaventura (FRA)

4 August 2012; 16:15	Croatia	32 – 21	Denmark	Copper Box, London; Attendance: 4,800; Referees: Lazaar, Reveret (FRA)
4 August 2012; 16:15	three players 5	(14–9)	Eggert Jensen, Lindberg 5	Copper Box, London; Attendance: 4,800; Referees: Lazaar, Reveret (FRA)
4 August 2012; 16:15	3× (yellow card) 2× (suspension)	Report	3× (yellow card) 3× (suspension)	Copper Box, London; Attendance: 4,800; Referees: Lazaar, Reveret (FRA)

4 August 2012; 21:15	Hungary	22 – 33	Spain	Copper Box, London; Attendance: 4,280; Referees: Horáček, Novotný (CZE)
4 August 2012; 21:15	Nagy 7	(13–16)	Aguinagalde 9	Copper Box, London; Attendance: 4,280; Referees: Horáček, Novotný (CZE)
4 August 2012; 21:15	4× (yellow card) 4× (suspension)	Report	3× (yellow card) 4× (suspension)	Copper Box, London; Attendance: 4,280; Referees: Horáček, Novotný (CZE)

6 August 2012; 09:30	Hungary	26 – 23	Serbia	Copper Box, London; Attendance: 4,159; Referees: Abrahamsen, Kristiansen (NOR)
6 August 2012; 09:30	Mocsai 9	(9–11)	Ilić, Prodanović 5	Copper Box, London; Attendance: 4,159; Referees: Abrahamsen, Kristiansen (NOR)
6 August 2012; 09:30	4× (yellow card) 3× (suspension)	Report	3× (yellow card) 4× (suspension)	Copper Box, London; Attendance: 4,159; Referees: Abrahamsen, Kristiansen (NOR)

6 August 2012; 14:30	Denmark	26 – 24	South Korea	Copper Box, London; Attendance: 4,546; Referees: Al-Nuaimi, Omar (UAE)
6 August 2012; 14:30	Eggert Jensen, Knudsen 6	(13–14)	Lee Jae-woo, Eom Hyo-won 6	Copper Box, London; Attendance: 4,546; Referees: Al-Nuaimi, Omar (UAE)
6 August 2012; 14:30	4× (yellow card) 2× (suspension)	Report	2× (yellow card) 1× (suspension)	Copper Box, London; Attendance: 4,546; Referees: Al-Nuaimi, Omar (UAE)

6 August 2012; 19:30	Spain	25 – 30	Croatia	Copper Box, London; Attendance: 4,856; Referees: Geipel, Helbig (GER)
6 August 2012; 19:30	Entrerríos, Tomás 5	(10–11)	Čupić, Lacković 7	Copper Box, London; Attendance: 4,856; Referees: Geipel, Helbig (GER)
6 August 2012; 19:30	3× (yellow card) 3× (suspension)	Report	4× (yellow card) 2× (suspension)	Copper Box, London; Attendance: 4,856; Referees: Geipel, Helbig (GER)

== Knockout stage ==
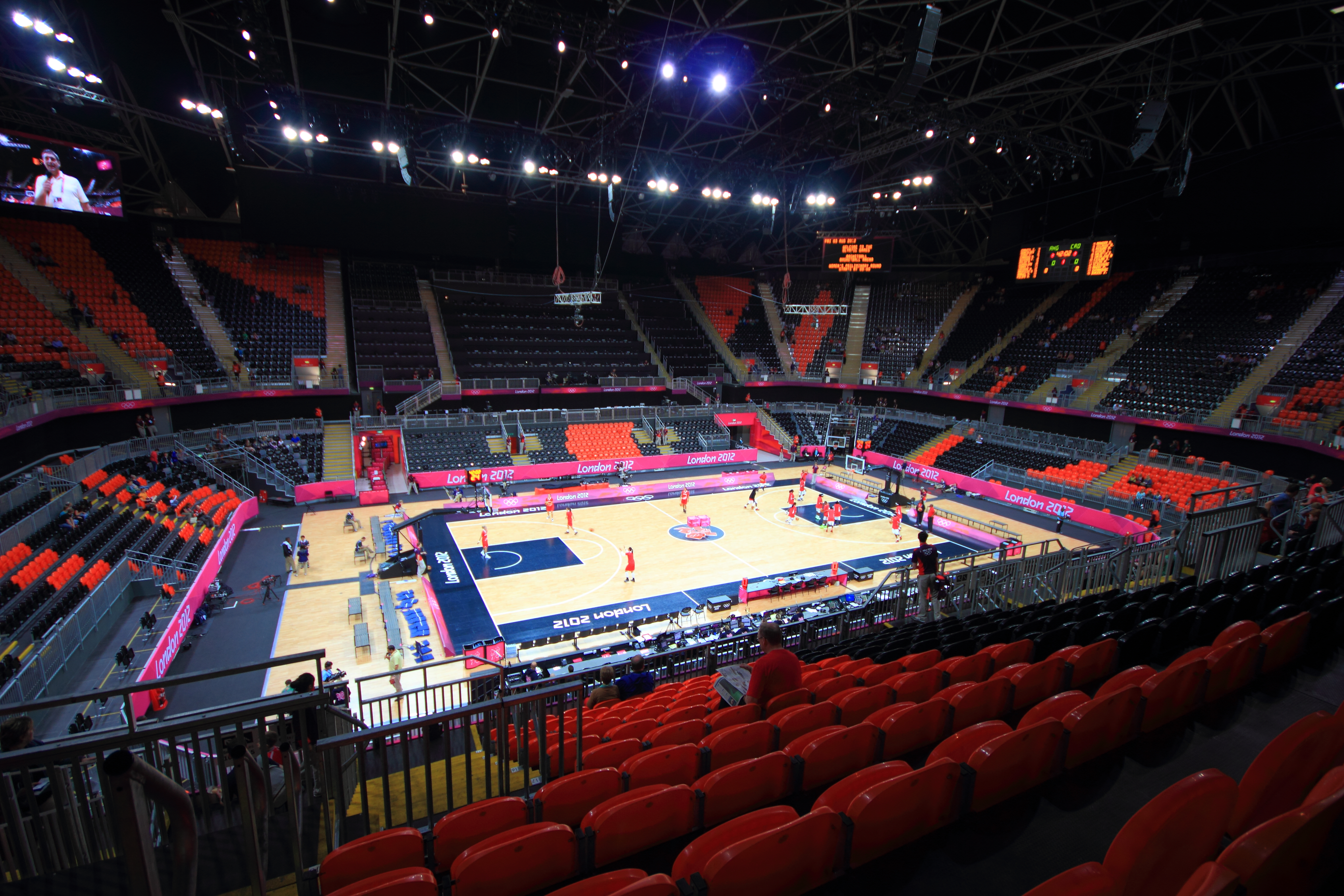
The Basketball Arena was the venue for the knockout stage of the men's tournament

Quarter-finals
A1	Iceland	33
B4	Hungary (OT)	34
B2	Denmark	22
A3	Sweden	24
A2	France	23
B3	Spain	22
B1	Croatia	25
A4	Tunisia	23

Semi-finals
B4	Hungary	26
A3	Sweden	27
A2	France	25
B1	Croatia	22

Gold Medal match
Sweden	21
France	22
Bronze medal match
B4	Hungary	26
Croatia	33

=== Quarter-finals ===
8 August 2012
11:00
Iceland
33 – 34 (ET)
Hungary
Basketball Arena, London
Attendance: 9,063
Referees: Lazaar, Reveret (FRA)
Sigurðsson 8
(12–16)
Nagy 9
3× (yellow card) 2× (suspension)
Report
3× (yellow card) 4× (suspension)

FT: 27–27 ET: 3–3, 3–4

8 August 2012; 14:30	Spain	22 – 23	France	Basketball Arena, London; Attendance: 8,890; Referees: Nikolić, Stojković (SRB)
8 August 2012; 14:30	Tomás 6	(12–9)	Accambray 7	Basketball Arena, London; Attendance: 8,890; Referees: Nikolić, Stojković (SRB)
8 August 2012; 14:30	4× (yellow card) 3× (suspension)	Report	4× (yellow card) 3× (suspension)	Basketball Arena, London; Attendance: 8,890; Referees: Nikolić, Stojković (SRB)

8 August 2012; 18:00	Sweden	24 – 22	Denmark	Basketball Arena, London; Attendance: 9,494; Referees: Nachevski, Nikolov (MKD)
8 August 2012; 18:00	Doder 6	(11–9)	Lindberg 6	Basketball Arena, London; Attendance: 9,494; Referees: Nachevski, Nikolov (MKD)
8 August 2012; 18:00	4× (yellow card) 5× (suspension)	Report	4× (yellow card) 2× (suspension)	Basketball Arena, London; Attendance: 9,494; Referees: Nachevski, Nikolov (MKD)

8 August 2012; 21:30	Croatia	25 – 23	Tunisia	Basketball Arena, London; Attendance: 9,578; Referees: Marina, Minore (ARG)
8 August 2012; 21:30	Čupić 8	(11–12)	Jallouz, Alouini 4	Basketball Arena, London; Attendance: 9,578; Referees: Marina, Minore (ARG)
8 August 2012; 21:30	2× (yellow card) 3× (suspension)	Report	4× (yellow card) 5× (suspension) 1× (red card)	Basketball Arena, London; Attendance: 9,578; Referees: Marina, Minore (ARG)

=== Semi-finals ===
10 August 2012; 17:00	Hungary	26 – 27	Sweden	Basketball Arena, London; Attendance: 9,597; Referees: Geipel, Helbig (GER)
10 August 2012; 17:00	Császár 8	(12–15)	Ekberg 6	Basketball Arena, London; Attendance: 9,597; Referees: Geipel, Helbig (GER)
10 August 2012; 17:00	4× (yellow card) 3× (suspension)	Report	3× (yellow card) 5× (suspension)	Basketball Arena, London; Attendance: 9,597; Referees: Geipel, Helbig (GER)

10 August 2012; 20:30	France	25 – 22	Croatia	Basketball Arena, London; Attendance: 9,849; Referees: Abrahamsen, Kristiansen (NOR)
10 August 2012; 20:30	three players 4	(12–10)	Horvat 6	Basketball Arena, London; Attendance: 9,849; Referees: Abrahamsen, Kristiansen (NOR)
10 August 2012; 20:30	4× (yellow card) 2× (suspension)	Report	4× (yellow card) 2× (suspension)	Basketball Arena, London; Attendance: 9,849; Referees: Abrahamsen, Kristiansen (NOR)

=== Bronze medal match ===
12 August 2012; 11:00	Hungary	26 – 33	Croatia	Basketball Arena, London; Attendance: 9,263; Referees: Horáček, Novotný (CZE)
12 August 2012; 11:00	Harsányi 7	(14–19)	Čupić 8	Basketball Arena, London; Attendance: 9,263; Referees: Horáček, Novotný (CZE)
12 August 2012; 11:00	4× (yellow card) 4× (suspension)	Report	3× (yellow card) 3× (suspension)	Basketball Arena, London; Attendance: 9,263; Referees: Horáček, Novotný (CZE)

=== Gold medal match ===
12 August 2012; 15:00	Sweden	21 – 22	France	Basketball Arena, London; Attendance: 9,627; Referees: Krstić, Ljubić (SLO)
12 August 2012; 15:00	Ekberg 6	(8–10)	Guigou 5	Basketball Arena, London; Attendance: 9,627; Referees: Krstić, Ljubić (SLO)
12 August 2012; 15:00	3× (yellow card) 4× (suspension)	Report	4× (yellow card) 2× (suspension)	Basketball Arena, London; Attendance: 9,627; Referees: Krstić, Ljubić (SLO)

== Ranking and statistics ==
=== Final ranking ===
Rank	Team
1st place, gold medalist(s)	France
2nd place, silver medalist(s)	Sweden
3rd place, bronze medalist(s)	Croatia
4	Hungary
5	Iceland
6	Denmark
7	Spain
8	Tunisia
9	Serbia
10	Argentina
11	South Korea
12	Great Britain

- Source: IHF.info

=== All-star team ===
- Goalkeeper: (France) Thierry Omeyer
- Left wing: (Sweden) Jonas Källman
- Left back: (Iceland) Aron Pálmarsson
- Central back: (France) Nikola Karabatić
- Right back: (Sweden) Kim Andersson
- Right wing: (Croatia) Ivan Čupić
- Pivot: (Spain) Julen Aguinagalde

Chosen by team officials and IHF experts: IHF.info

=== Top goalscorers ===
Rank	Name	Team	Goals	Shots	%
1	Niclas Ekberg	Sweden	50	74	68%
2	Ivan Čupić	Croatia	49	68	72%
3	Guðjón Valur Sigurðsson	Iceland	44	66	67%
4	Gábor Császár	Hungary	38	67	57%
5	Aron Pálmarsson	Iceland	37	63	59%
6	László Nagy	Hungary	33	71	46%
7	Domagoj Duvnjak	Croatia	32	58	55%
7	Anders Eggert Jensen	Denmark	32	44	74%
7	Blaženko Lacković	Croatia	32	53	60%
7	Daniel Narcisse	France	32	51	63%

- Source: IHF.info

=== Top goalkeepers ===
Rank	Name	Team	%	Saves	Shots
1	Hreiðar Guðmundsson	Iceland	44%	48	110
2	Johan Sjostrand	Sweden	41%	73	176
3	Marcus Cleverly	Denmark	39%	19	49
4	Venio Losert	Croatia	37%	23	63
4	Thierry Omeyer	France	37%	94	252
4	Darko Stanić	Serbia	37%	66	179
4	Arpad Šterbik	Spain	37%	61	164
8	Mirko Alilović	Croatia	36%	82	226
9	Niklas Landin Jacobsen	Denmark	34%	62	185
10	Matías Schulz	Argentina	33%	46	140

- Source: IHF.info

== Medalists ==
Gold	Silver	Bronze
France Jérôme Fernandez; Didier Dinart; Xavier Barachet; Guillaume Gille; Bertrand Gille; Daniel Narcisse; Guillaume Joli; Samuel Honrubia; Daouda Karaboué; Nikola Karabatić; Thierry Omeyer; William Accambray; Luc Abalo; Cédric Sorhaindo; Michaël Guigou Head Coach: Claude Onesta	Sweden Mattias Andersson; Mattias Gustafsson; Kim Andersson; Jonas Källman; Magnus Jernemyr; Niclas Ekberg; Dalibor Doder; Jonas Larholm; Tobias Karlsson; Johan Jakobsson; Johan Sjöstrand; Fredrik Petersen; Kim Ekdahl du Rietz; Mattias Zachrisson; Andreas Nilsson Head Coach: Staffan Olsson	Croatia Venio Losert; Ivano Balić; Domagoj Duvnjak; Blaženko Lacković; Marko Kopljar; Igor Vori; Jakov Gojun; Zlatko Horvat; Drago Vuković; Damir Bičanić; Denis Buntić; Mirko Alilović; Manuel Štrlek; Ivan Čupić; Ivan Ninčević Head Coach: Slavko Goluža
